= Oxytocin (disambiguation) =

Oxytocin is a peptide hormone and brain chemical.

Oxytocin may also refer to:

- Oxytocin (medication), a medication made from oxytocin used to start or strengthen contraction of the uterus during childbirth
- "Oxytocin", a song by Billie Eilish from her 2021 album Happier Than Ever.

== See also ==
- Category:Oxytocin
- OxyContin, a semi-synthetic opioid used for pain treatment
