= Lost Cause (Billie Eilish song) =

- Vevo "Official Live Performance" cover

Single by Billie Eilish

from the album Happier Than Ever
- Released: June 2, 2021
- Genre: Downtempo; funk; soft rock
- Length: 3:32
- Label: Darkroom; Interscope
- Songwriters: Billie Eilish; Finneas O'Connell
- Producer: Finneas

Billie Eilish singles chronology
"Your Power" (2021)	"Lost Cause" (2021)	"NDA" (2021)

Music video
- "Lost Cause" on YouTube

"Lost Cause" is a song by American singer-songwriter Billie Eilish and the fourth single from her second studio album, Happier Than Ever (2021). A downtempo, funk, and soft rock song, it incorporates elements from jazz, R&B, and trip hop. Its minimalist production consists of drums, a bassline, synthesizers, and acoustic guitars. Eilish makes use of a crooning vocal style. In the lyrics, she celebrates a break-up with an arrogant and apathetic ex-partner, calling them a "lost cause" in the refrain. She wrote the song with its producer, her brother Finneas O'Connell.

The song was released on June 2, 2021, through Darkroom and Interscope Records. A music video for "Lost Cause", directed by Eilish, premiered the same day. It depicts her with a group of female friends in a slumber party. They perform various activities in a large house, such as twerking, dancing around a king-sized bed, and playing the game Twister. Many viewers perceived the music video as homoerotic, causing fan speculation around Eilish's sexual orientation. Some thought she was coming out as being attracted to women, while others thought she was queerbaiting.

"Lost Cause" debuted on the US Billboard Hot 100 chart at its peak of number 27. The song was the highest new entry on the Irish Singles Chart (number 9) for the week of June 11, 2021, and the UK Singles Chart (number 14) during the week of June 14, 2021.

== Background ==
Billie Eilish won five awards at the 62nd Annual Grammy Awards held in 2020 for her work on her debut studio album, When We All Fall Asleep, Where Do We Go? (2019). It was a commercial success that brought her mainstream fame, debuting at number one on many national record charts. Eilish revealed she would work on her second studio album in 2020. She announced the album's track list and title—Happier Than Ever (2021)—on April 27, 2021. Set for release 3 months later, on July 30, it contains "Lost Cause" as the seventh song on the tracklist. A single from Happier Than Ever, "Your Power", was released two days after the announcement. It is the third single from the album, after the 2020 songs "My Future" and "Therefore I Am".

Eilish posted to Instagram on May 28, 2021, to tease a single scheduled for release within the following days. Alongside the post were a silent, five-second video in which she gazed away from the camera and a caption that read "new song out next week." Singer and producer Finneas O'Connell, Eilish's brother and close collaborator on music, confirmed the upcoming release via his Twitter account. On May 31, 2021, Eilish shared two photos of herself to Instagram, the post for which was captioned "nothing but a lost cause." The next day, she announced on her social media accounts that "Lost Cause" and its music video would be released tomorrow, June 2, making it the fourth single from Happier Than Ever.

== Music and lyrics ==
"Lost Cause"
"Lost Cause" is a downtempo, funk, and soft rock song that takes elements from jazz, R&B, and trip hop. It features drums, synthesizers, a bassline, and a crooning vocal style.

Music journalists described "Lost Cause" as a downtempo, funk, and soft rock song. Taking elements from 1950s jazz, R&B, and trip-hop, it features a crooning vocal style and minimalist instrumentation that consists of drums, a bassline, synthesizers, and acoustic guitar. The guitar contains a reverberating effect. In an interview with Vevo, Eilish disclosed that she intended for Happier Than Ever to sound like a "timeless record". To this end, she sought to recreate the musical styles of jazz artists like Frank Sinatra, Julie London, and Peggy Lee on much of the album tracks, including "Lost Cause". The song has a duration of 3 minutes and 32 seconds.

The lyrics celebrate independence from an ex-partner, whom Eilish deems a "lost cause" in the refrain. In the verses, she communicates how she has gotten over the break-up, judging them to be unworthy of her attention due to the person's detachment from the relationship. Eilish sings about her first impressions of the ex-partner, that she thought they were just shy, but she realizes that they were emotionally immature, apathetic towards her feelings, and egotistical. Reflecting on her expectations, she recalls how she trusted the person to work on their flaws as the relationship progressed but to no avail.

During the refrain, Eilish calls out the ex-partner's perception of themself as an "outlaw". To humble them, she criticizes their irresponsibility by pointing out their state of unemployment. The first pre-chorus, the lyrics before the refrain, contains the lines "I sent you flowers / Did you even care?"; the second pre-chorus contains the lines "Gave me no flowers / Wish I didn't care". Callie Ahlgrim of Insider interpreted the difference in wording as demonstrative of Eilish's insecurities in spite of her celebratory facade: "[the lines expose] the imbalance of love and affection that continues to haunt her."

== Critical reception ==
During the week of the song's release, Billboard held an online poll asking its readers to vote on their favorite new music. "Lost Cause" topped the poll, chosen by 50.54% of the respondents.

P. Claire Dodson of Teen Vogue compared the track to Eilish's previous single "Your Power" (2021), describing the latter as "more vulnerable [and] airy" while saying the former is a "lighter, more playful type of roast". Coco Romack of MTV described the song as a "low-key empowerment anthem" and compared it to R&B girl group TLC's 1999 single "No Scrubs" and English singer Dua Lipa's 2017 single "New Rules". James Rettig for Stereogum called the track "breezy and laidback". Stephanie Eckardt of W mentioned that "Lost Cause" is just the "latest indication of where [Eilish]'s headed next leading up to the release of her long-awaited sophomore album Happier Than Ever". Gabrielle Sanchez for The A.V. Club opined Eilish is known for "clinging to the melancholy, whispering sad tales of monsters under the bed" but explained the song sees her "looking happier than she's ever been". Joe Smith of Gigwise stated that "Lost Cause" is a "groovy and subdued effort from Eilish that captures exactly what made her so popular in the first place".

== Music video ==
=== Background and synopsis ===
A music video for the song was released the same day as the single. The video was solely directed by Eilish, and was shot on April 22, 2021. A day later, the singer uploaded a behind-the-scenes video to TikTok for the visual. It shows Eilish and her backup dancers having to go from kneeling on the floor to standing and jumping around while making sure their clothes were kept in place. Derrick Rossignol from Uproxx stated Eilish's chest "was exposed than she apparently wanted the world to see, so she covered it with an emoji and wrote in text superimposed onto the video, 'titties was [sic] falling out'".

In the music video, Eilish invites a group of women for a day party in a Los Angeles mansion to do some interpretive dance moves around a king sized bed, move in and out of walk-in closets, twerk, play Twister, spray silly string, shoot water guns, drink orange soda, and eat potato chips. Eilish wears an oversized beige tee and matching cream bike shorts by Skims, while her friends wear tank tops and sweaters. Eilish then changes into a blue camisole, shorts, and robe, while her friends wear "slinky pieces" in pastel blues and grays.

=== Reception ===
The music video for "Lost Cause" depicts Eilish with a group of female friends who have a slumber party. Many of its viewers perceived it as containing homoerotic undertones.

Christian Allaire of Vogue stated the "matchy-matchy outfits are what truly make this slumber party soirée one to remember". Jordan Darville of The Fader and Brit Dawson of Dazed compared the visual to American singer Beyoncé's 2014 single "7/11"'s music video. The staff of DIY mentioned the video has a "color-coordinated and immaculately-choreographed slumber party". Mia Mercado for The Cut opined the visual "can be best summarized as a giant (kinda horny?) sleepover".

Many who viewed the music video perceived it as being homoerotic. Due to the sexual nature of the music video and that it only features women, following its release fans and media started speculating about Eilish's sexual orientation with some being positive and congratulating her for coming out, while others accused her of queerbaiting. The queerbaiting allegations escalated on June 10, when Eilish posted behind-the-scenes photos of the music video shoot on Instagram with the caption "i love girls." It was the second time that Eilish had been accused of queerbaiting, following the release of her 2019 single "Wish You Were Gay". Three days later, the singer uploaded a selfie to her Instagram with captioned "I'm tired." Some fans and publications defended Eilish, while others still saw her actions as inappropriate. Eilish would later come out as queer in December 2023.

== Release and commercial performance ==
Darkroom and Interscope Records released "Lost Cause" as Happier Than Ever's fourth single on June 2, 2021, through digital download and streaming media formats. It was sent to contemporary hit radio stations in Australia later that month. Like all previous singles from the album, "Lost Cause" reached the top 40 of the US Billboard Hot 100 record chart. It debuted at number 27, its peak position, on the issue dated June 19, 2021. The song dropped off the chart a few weeks after; it re-entered at number 84 upon Happier Than Ever's release, one of nine concurrent entries from Eilish on the Billboard Hot 100.

"Lost Cause" was the highest debut in the Irish Singles Chart for the week of June 11, 2021, and the UK Singles Chart for the week of June 14, 2021. The song entered those charts at its peak positions of number 9 and number 14, respectively. In the process, it became Eilish's ninth top 20 single in the UK and her tenth top 10 single in Ireland. (Note: References for the song's debut and peak position in: Ireland; the UK) It debuted on the singles chart by the Australian Recording Industry Association (ARIA), the same week as its Ireland debut, at number 18, making it the second highest new entry during the period. The song stopped charting after a few weeks, and it reappeared at number 46 following the release of Happier Than Ever.

In terms of international commercial performance, "Lost Cause" debuted at number 125 on the Billboard Global 200, eventually peaking at number 15 on the week of June 19, 2021. The song reached the top 25 of national charts in Lithuania (12), New Zealand (15), Canada (16), Switzerland (17), Singapore (18), Portugal and Slovakia (22), Norway (23), Austria (24), and Sweden (25).

== Live performances ==
After Happier Than Ever's release, Eilish appeared as a headliner on the 2021 Life Is Beautiful festival; many songs on the set list were tracks from the album. "Lost Cause" was one of the songs played. In 2022, Eilish included the song in the set lists for the Glastonbury festival and a 2022–2023 world tour in support of Happier Than Ever.

== Credits and personnel ==
Credits adapted from Tidal.

- Billie Eilish – vocals, songwriting, vocal engineering
- Finneas O'Connell – production, songwriting, acoustic guitar, background vocals, drum programming, engineering, synth bass, vocal arrangement
- Dave Kutch – master engineering
- Rob Kinelski – mixing

== Charts ==
=== Weekly charts ===
Weekly chart performance for "Lost Cause"
Chart (2021)	Peak position
Australia (ARIA)	18
Austria (Ö3 Austria Top 40)	24
Canada Hot 100 (Billboard)	16
Czech Republic Singles Digital (ČNS IFPI)	36
Denmark (Tracklisten)	35
France (SNEP)	99
Germany (GfK)	45
Global 200 (Billboard)	15
Hungary (Single Top 40)	34
Hungary (Stream Top 40)	29
Iceland (Tónlistinn)	36
Ireland (IRMA)	9
Italy (FIMI)	88
Lithuania (AGATA)	12
Netherlands (Single Top 100)	48
New Zealand (Recorded Music NZ)	15
Norway (VG-lista)	23
Portugal (AFP)	22
Singapore (RIAS)	18
Slovakia (Singles Digitál Top 100)	22
Sweden (Sverigetopplistan)	25
Switzerland (Schweizer Hitparade)	17
UK Singles (Official Charts)	14
US Billboard Hot 100	27
US Hot Rock & Alternative Songs (Billboard)	3

=== Year-end charts ===
Year-end chart performance for "Lost Cause"
Chart (2021)	Position
US Hot Rock & Alternative Songs (Billboard)	22

== Certifications ==
Certifications and sales for "Lost Cause"
Region	Certification	Certified units/sales
Australia (ARIA)	Platinum	70,000^{‡}
Brazil (Pro-Música Brasil)	2× Platinum	80,000^{‡}
Canada (Music Canada)	Platinum	80,000^{‡}
France (SNEP)	Gold	100,000^{‡}
New Zealand (RMNZ)	Platinum	30,000^{‡}
Poland (ZPAV)	Gold	25,000^{‡}
Portugal (AFP)	Gold	5,000^{‡}
United Kingdom (BPI)	Silver	200,000^{‡}
^{‡} Sales+streaming figures based on certification alone.

== Release history ==
Release dates and formats for "Lost Cause"
Region	Date	Format	Label	Ref.
Various	June 2, 2021	Digital download; streaming	Darkroom; Interscope	
Australia	June 6, 2021	Radio airplay	UMA	
United States	June 8, 2021 (Note: Release as a promotional single)	Contemporary hit radio	Darkroom; Interscope	
