= Oxytocin (song) =

2021 song by Billie Eilish

Song by Billie Eilish

from the album Happier Than Ever
- Released: July 30, 2021
- Recorded: February 16, 2021
- Genre: EDM; electronica; electropop; industrial pop; techno
- Length: 3:30
- Label: Darkroom; Interscope
- Songwriters: Billie Eilish O'Connell; Finneas O'Connell
- Producer: Finneas

Lyric video
- "Oxytocin" on YouTube

"Oxytocin" is a song by American singer-songwriter Billie Eilish from her second studio album, Happier Than Ever, released on July 30, 2021, through Darkroom and Interscope Records. She wrote it with its producer―her brother, Finneas O'Connell, who also provided backing vocals. An EDM, electronica, electropop, industrial pop and techno song, "Oxytocin" was the last track created for the album. While composing it, Eilish aimed to make it sound "insane" when performed live, envisioning sexual imagery for the lyrics.

The song has been described by music critics as "horny", "upbeat" and Eilish's "sexiest song yet". Named after the hormone oxytocin, which is produced during sex, the track talks about sexuality and experimentation of the artist. Sonically, it drew comparisons to works of Crystal Castles, Grimes, Nine Inch Nails and Timbaland, as well as to Eilish's debut studio album, When We All Fall Asleep, Where Do We Go? (2019), especially its fifth single, "Bad Guy". Described as a fan favorite, "Oxytocin" received widespread acclaim from music critics praising its production, sentiment and vocal delivery.

"Oxytocin" charted in a number of countries upon the release of Happier Than Ever, including reaching the top 40 in Australia, Denmark, Hungary, Ireland, Lithuania, Norway and the United Kingdom, while appearing at number 72 in the United States. Eilish performed the song for her Disney+ concert film Happier Than Ever: A Love Letter to Los Angeles and at music festivals such as iHeartRadio Music Festival and Life Is Beautiful Music & Art Festival. "Oxytocin" was part of the set list of a 2022–2023 world tour in support of Happier Than Ever, interpolating elements of her 2017 single "Copycat".

== Writing and recording ==
"The [color] of whatever was in my brain while making it was dark, but also a flashing yellow. Honestly, the images I have for 'Oxytocin' were just sex. That's it. All different kinds, and styles, and [colors], and locations. That's really what was in my head. Sex."

— Eilish talking about the song to The Guardian.

"Oxytocin" was written by Billie Eilish and Finneas, while the latter handled production and provided backing vocals. It was the last track created for Happier Than Ever, being recorded on February 16, 2021, in Finneas's basement studio; it replaced "What I Wanna Hear?" on its final track listing. The singer spoke about the creative process behind the song and said that it is named after the hormone of the same name, which is released due to love or childbirth. In an interview with The Guardian, Eilish talked about inspiration for the track, saying that "[t]here was flashing in [her] head", adding that she had sex images in her mind during the recording. Additionally, she admitted that in the song's background, barking of her dog Shark can be heard.

She also noted that the album had been "missing" a song that would expressly "be insane live", which was why "Oxytocin" was created. She also mentioned that while performing the song, she thinks about sex. The singer also said that "Oxytocin" is the "most satisfying" song and added that it is one of her favorite tracks from the album. Finneas was proud of how the song came out due to its "gated tremolo and distortion".

== Music and lyrics ==
Musically, "Oxytocin" is a dance, EDM, electronica, electropop, industrial pop and techno song, (Note: Source labeling "Oxytocin" as a dance song: Vancouver Sun; Source labeling "Oxytocin" as an EDM song: The Ringer; Source labeling "Oxytocin" as an electronica song: ABC News; Sources labeling "Oxytocin" as an electropop song: Insider, and Contact Music; Source labeling "Oxytocin" as an industrial pop song: Chorus.fm, and Los Angeles Times; Sources labeling "Oxytocin" as a techno song: Los Angeles Times, The Guardian, MTV News, and Jenesaispop) with elements of dubstep. It is set in the key of E minor, with a tempo of 125 beats per minute. Eilish's vocals range from E_{3} to B_{4}, while her vocal performance has been described as "breathy whispers", "subtle", "steamy and slightly strained". The song contains a "techno pulse", "bursts of atonal synth", "upbeat", "heavy" and "eerie" bass, "lo-fi beats", "club groove", "evocative vocal echoes", and "hypnotic rhythm". Before the outro kicks in, there is a second of silence; Courteney Larrocca of Insider described the production of this moment as "overdrive".

"Oxytocin"
The chorus of "Oxytocin", featuring Eilish's vocals over pulse and synth.

Music critics have described the song's lyrics as "eroticized", "horny", and Eilish's "sexiest song yet". In the first verse, Eilish is "exploring the more raunchy side of a hookup", using the couplet, "If you only pray on Sunday, could you come my way on Monday / 'Cause I like to do things God doesn't approve of if she saw us". Later in the track, Eilish delves into her sexuality and experimentation; in the pre-chorus, she sings, "What would people say if they listen through the wall?". In the chorus, Eilish shouts, "You should really run away" over the bass, while in the post-chorus she croons, "I wanna do bad things to you". She finishes the second verse with much darker lyrics, "'Cause as long as you're still breathing / Don't you even think of leaving".

== Critical reception ==
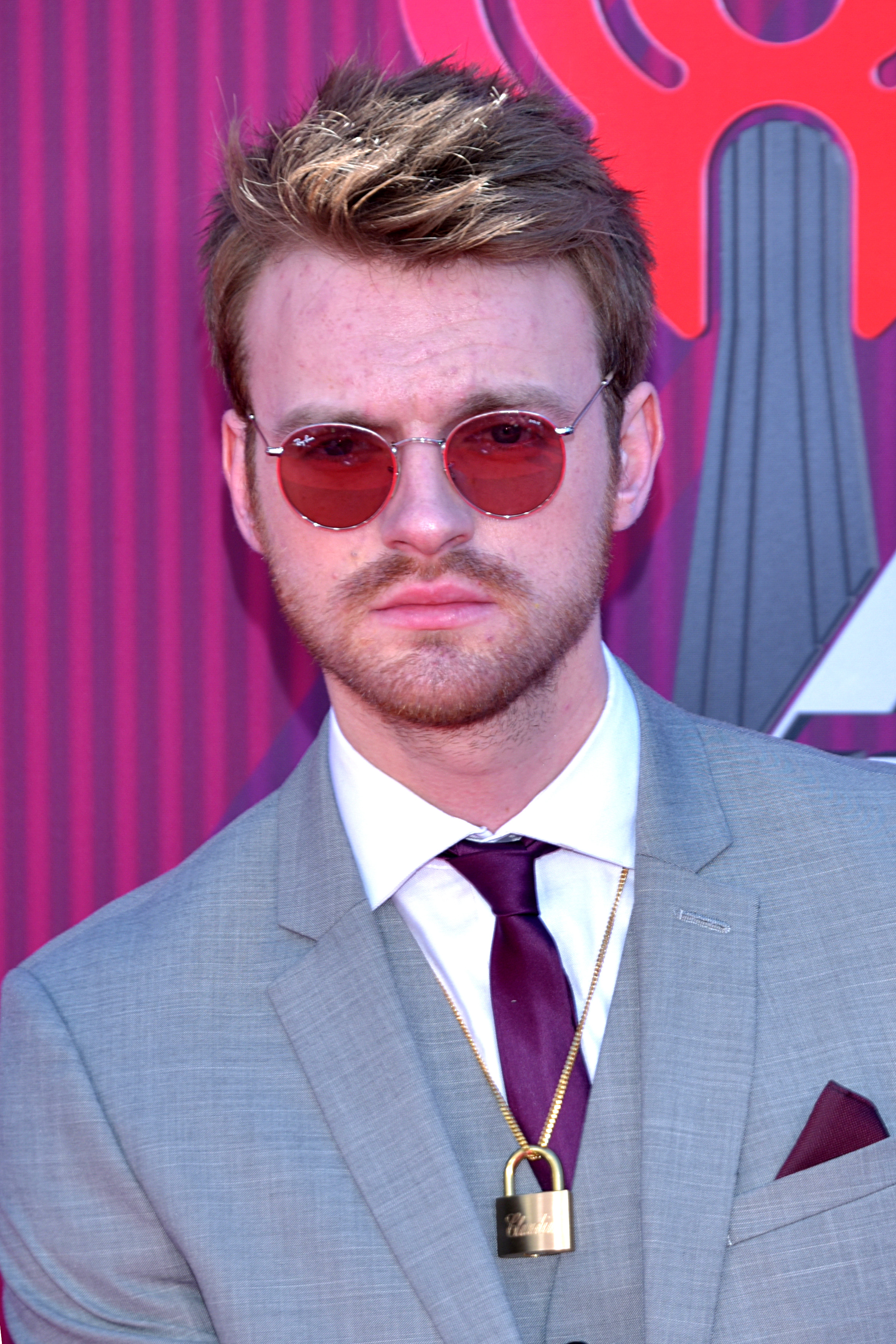
Finneas's production was met with critical acclaim. Rebecca Breitfeller from Young Hollywood said that it "perfectly describes the feelings being portrayed about the 'love hormone' that is oxytocin".

"Oxytocin" was met with widespread critical acclaim, with critics mostly praising its production, sentiment and vocal delivery. Ranking "Oxytocin" sixth out of the sixteen tracks on Happier Than Ever, Hannah Dailey of Billboard called the song "a rarity" from Eilish, as it is "overtly sexual", and noted that Eilish's "usually low-decibel voice" is raised to "a feral shout as she belts 'You should really run away.'" Dailey also noted that the production works "in tandem with Eilish's lyrics", as it "intensifies into a hungry, pounding beat". Gil Kaufman of the same publication described the beat of the song as "dramatic". Writing for NME, El Hunt linked "Oxytocin" to the "futuristic sound" of Eilish's debut studio album, When We All Fall Asleep, Where Do We Go? (2019), when Carl Wilson from Slate called it "Bad Guy"-esque, due to "its keyboard and vocal stylizations". Another comparison to Eilish's debut album material was made in Hot Press article, where Ed Power called "Oxytocin" reminiscent of "Bad Guy", but with "some dubstep in its soul", additionally noting that the song has a "lurching" groove. The track was also heavily compared to the singer's earlier number in articles published on The Ringer, with the website's Rob Harvilla describing it as "the fastest, loudest, most hypnotic, and disruptive moment on [the album]". Vancouver Sun's Stuart Derdeyn described the track as "hypnotic" and "chanting", commenting that it is "classic spooky Billie". For The A.V. Club, Alex McLevy called the track a "saucy ode to lust". Rolling Stone's Brittany Spanos called its beat "slinky", while for the same publication, Angie Martoccio said that the song "should absolutely be made into a genre of its own". Larocca called the track "hot", while Callie Ahlgrim of Insider complimented Finneas's production. Emma Holbrook of The Forty-Five called the song's chorus one of the darkest lyrics on the album. ABC News's Mark Kennedy opined that the track starts off as "sexy come-on", which he called "appropriate" due to how the hormone the song got its name from controls reproduction. Additionally, he made a comment that the song "brilliantly shifts halfway through, turning lust into something darker". Writing for Cult MTL, Dave MacIntyre said that Eilish is "gliding over brother Finneas's glitchy production". In an article published by Gigwise, "Oxytocin" was paired with "Billie Bossa Nova" as a sign of "mature, more sultry evolution in Eilish's content".

In an article written for The Focus, Olivia Olphin said that "Oxytocin" continues "in the vein of previous single 'NDA', with low-fi beats and breathy vocals"; similarly, Ellen Peirson-Hagger of the New Statesman described the track as a "breathy, synth-heavy" song. Kate Solomon from i said that it is "all bedroom beats and sighs as Eilish officially enters her femme fatale era". Chris Willman of Variety complimented the song, since it "leans in harder on a beat to get you on your feet, it's a welcome breath of hot air", while the Los Angeles Times's Mikael Wood said that "[Eilish] rides a jackhammering club groove with giddy menace". Alex Swhear from Flood Magazine said that the track "nods at the sharp-edged propulsion of her early singles just as the listener becomes convinced that sort of thing won't be arriving". "Oxytocin" has been described as a "banger" by Salvatore Maicki of The Fader and Stuart Derdeyn of Vancouver Sun. Ahlgrim of Insider said that the track reminds her of a "neon-lit club" with "Eilish in the center"—"powerful and magnetic"—comparing it to the energy consumed by a supermassive black hole. In AllMusic, Neil Z. Yeung opined that the track "[throbs] to life with deep bass and a thick beat", calling it "lustful" and a "club hit in the making". Ed Power of The Quietus wrote that "[Eilish] radiates a nightmarish menace. It's half banger, half bad dream from which you cannot awaken". For Atwood Magazine, Mariel Fechik described the song as a "dark club track" and depicted that it adds a "much needed gut-punch to the album's first half". Paste's Jason Friedman called the song the "steamiest and sexiest track the songwriter has released thus far", which contains the same "energic magic" that defined Eilish's biggest hits "promising to demolish nightclub dance-floors when (if?) we get to make a truly safe return". Writing for MTV, Athena Serrano opined that "this is the perfect song to get your grind on". Miranda Sawyer from The Guardian said that the song reminds her of "dark clubs at 3am". Naming the track "ethereal" and an "unexpected album highlight", Holly Mosley of Contact Music wrote that it "make[s] us yearn for the dance floor". It has been labeled as a "bop" and "whiplash" with a "skull-gripping beat" and "a bit forced techno spirit" by Jordi Bardají from Jenesaispop.

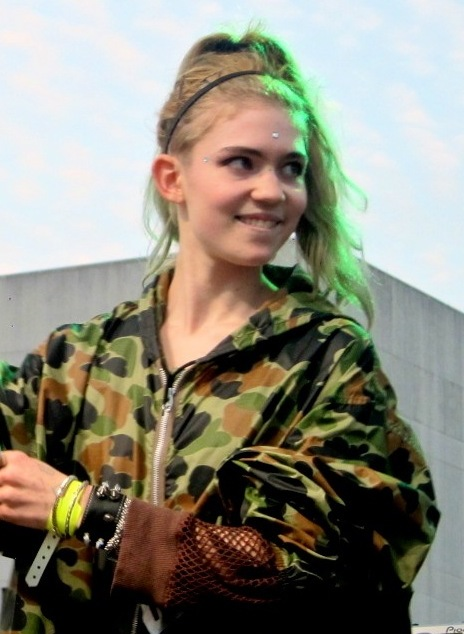
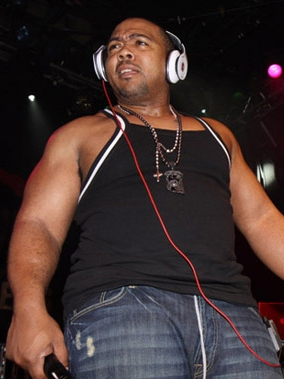
Music commentary compared "Oxytocin" to works of various artists, including acts like Grimes (left) and Timbaland (right).

"Oxytocin" received many comparitions to other artists' works. For The Line of Best Fit, Matthew Kent saw that the song is "club-ready", calling it a "whisper-pop anthem" and "hot-and-heavy". Kent asserted that the production from Finneas is reminiscent of Timbaland, with Eilish "invoking the spirit" of Nelly Furtado's Loose (2006). Alhrgrim also likened the song to Timbaland and Furtado, as well as to Grimes and late Sofi Tukker. Quinn Moreland of Pitchfork called "Oxytocin" an "obvious hit", writing that the song "places Eilish's famous breathy whispers deep inside the walls of a dark, steamy club" and that it "starts off sultry, all body rolls, before it turns on a dime and launches itself out a window in a blitz of abrasive synths à la Crystal Castles or early Grimes". Another Crystal Castles comparition was made in Stereogum's article written by Tom Breihan. For Spin, Ilana Kaplan said that the track "creates an atmospheric '90s rave scene that evokes early Nine Inch Nails through gripping synths"; The New York Times's Lindsay Zoladz also found a similarity between "Oxytocin" and Nine Inch Nails music. In Chorus.fm article, the stuff was very keen of the song, with Aaron Mook and Adam Grundy comparing it to aforementioned band Nine Inch Nails, the former also complimented placement of "Oxytocin" after "Billie Bossa Nova" and "My Future", whereas Garrett Lemon placed it as an "album highlight" amongst the album's title track and "NDA".

PopMatters's John Amen and DIY's Lisa Wright also labeled "Oxytocin" as an album "highlight", with the latter further writing "juddering beats and disorientating vocals are the kind of strange, prickly track that no-one else in the world could come up with right now: a combination that's technically jarring, but that somehow coalesces into a banger that will absolutely kick off on the live stage", whilst according to the former it is a "swingy, stoner-ish track built around busy percussive elements and Eilish's steamy and slightly strained vocal." In the article published by The Face, the song was described as "purring highlight". The track's placement within an album was praised by Kate French-Morris and called "tense" and "canny". According to Tim Sentz of Beats Per Minute, the song "builds [up] nicely". In Mary Varvaris's opinion, "Oxytocin" should have been released as a single, since it is "[s]uch a fun, gritty song for her to release that's going to click with a lot of listeners." Further anticipation for any type of release has been shown by Vulture's Justin Curto in his article regarding "Male Fantasy" music video publishment. He wrote there that "we continue to wait for a video for 'Oxytocin.'" Sam Prance from PopBuzz labeled the track as the album's "standout". Publications such as The Face, The Fader, and i recommended to listen to the song. Alexandra Pollard of The Independent was more negative towards "Oxytocin", writing that it was "almost unbearably creepy without having much substance to it" and calling it one of the "few duds" on Happier Than Ever. Similarly, Lindsay Zoladz from The New York Times opined that the song is not "exactly saying much", however adding that it's one of more "up-beat" songs of the album; whilst Lani Renaldo of The Ringer said that it is her least favorite song from the whole album.

=== Listicles ===
"Oxytocin" has been called the 20th best song by Billie Eilish by Far Out Magazine's Tyler Golsen, stating it is the "perfect example of Eilish taking catchy elements and making them ever so slightly unsettling." The song also appeared on Los Angeles Times's and Slant Magazine's lists of the best songs of 2021, at numbers 30 and 7, respectively. The former's review reads "Pulsating with currents of steely [19]90s-industrial and techno sounds, this Happier Than Ever B-side gets its name from the so-called love hormone emitted during sex — which Eilish craves, and fears herself for craving"; while the latter said that it is "masterfully orchestrates dynamic shading and opens up a dark, slick electronic playground that's well-suited to her paper-thin vocals. The verses' incessant clacking ramps up the tension ever so slowly, before Eilish sings the chorus in breathy whispers (...) Its dynamic range and slick production make 'Oxytocin' one of the most inventive songs from Eilish's catalog and her most convincingly menacing." Additionally, in the results of a poll held by the American website Pitchfork, depicted "Oxytocin" as the 86th best song of 2021 according to the website's readers.

"Oxytocin" on year-end lists
Publication	List	Rank	Ref.
Los Angeles Times	The 100 Best Songs of 2021	30	
Pitchfork	The Best Music of 2021: Top 100 Songs	86	
Slant Magazine	The 50 Best Songs of 2021	7	

== Promotion and commercial performance ==
"Oxytocin" was released as the fifth track on Eilish's second studio album, Happier Than Ever, on July 30, 2021. Simultaneously, the lyric video for the track was uploaded to the singer's official YouTube channel. The official Billie Eilish store also began selling an "Oxytocin" hoodie. The song appeared within top 40 of eight charts, charting at number 12 of the US Hot Rock & Alternative Songs, 24 in Ireland, 25 in Lithuania, 32 in the United Kingdom with 11,864 sales, 33 in Norway, 34 in Denmark, 38 in Australia and 39 in Billboard Global 200. It also debuted at number 72 in the US.

=== Live performances ===
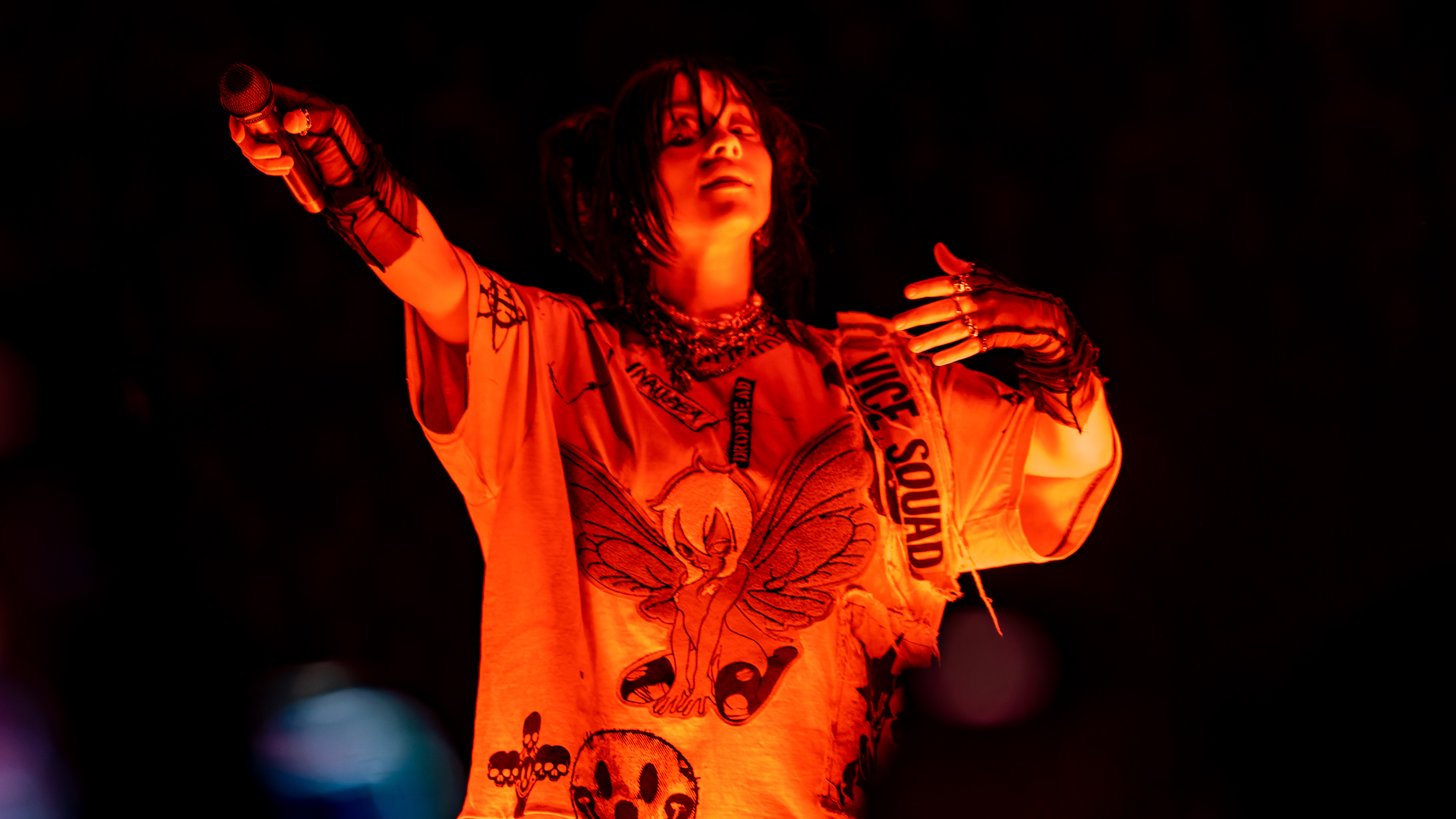
Eilish performing "Oxytocin" during a 2022–2023 world tour in support of Happier Than Ever

A live performance of the track is included in the concert film entitled Happier Than Ever: A Love Letter to Los Angeles, and it was shared on August 31, 2021, three days ahead of the film's release. The performance starts off with an animated sequence, where Eilish's character rides a Porsche, while the in-real-life gig took place at the Hollywood Bowl. During the performance, the singer was surrounded by red lights and accompanied by Finneas on keyboards and a drummer. After screaming the chorus line, Eilish is seen jumping around. The performance received critical acclaim. It was called "great" by Derrick Rossignol of Uproxx, while Ahlgrim said it is "clear standout" and "pulsing". Writing for Billboard, Gil Kaufman dubbed it as "intense", while Sydney Urbanek praised how the performance was directed. Spin's Marisa Whitaker said that the singer "radiates modern gothic vibes, dancing and singing amidst flashing strobe lights", whereas Cnet's Abrar Al-Heeti saw it as a "standout performance" with "flashing red lights and blissful chaos".

Eilish debuted "Oxytocin" live during her five-song set at the 2021 iHeartRadio Music Festival on September 19. One day later, she included that song on her set of 2021 Life Is Beautiful Music & Art Festival. Eilish embarked on a 2022–2023 world tour in support of Happier Than Ever, where "Oxytocin" was included in its set list. This rendition interpolated a snippet of the singer's 2017 single "Copycat". The artist asks fans to jump "as low as possible" during the performance of this song. Spanos dubbed this rendition as "slithering". "Oxytocin" was retained in her subsequent tour promoting 2024's Hit Me Hard and Soft.

== Credits and personnel ==
- Billie Eilish – vocals, songwriting, vocal engineering
- Finneas O'Connell – songwriting, production, bass, drum programming, engineering, percussion, synth bass, synthesizer, vocal arrangement
- Dave Kutch – mastering
- Rob Kinelski – mixing
- Casey Cuayo – mixing assistant
- Eli Heisler – mixing assistant

== Charts ==
=== Weekly charts ===
Weekly chart performance for "Oxytocin"
Chart (2021)	Peak position
Australia (ARIA)	38
Canada Hot 100 (Billboard)	47
Czech Republic Singles Digital (ČNS IFPI)	99
Denmark (Tracklisten)	34
France (SNEP)	130
Global 200 (Billboard)	39
Greece (IFPI)	51
Hungary (Rádiós Top 40)	39
Hungary (Single Top 40)	30
Ireland (IRMA)	24
Lithuania (AGATA)	25
Norway (VG-lista)	33
Portugal (AFP)	43
Slovakia (Singles Digitál Top 100)	59
Sweden (Sverigetopplistan)	52
UK Singles (Official Charts)	32
US Billboard Hot 100	72
US Hot Rock & Alternative Songs (Billboard)	12

=== Year-end charts ===
Year-end chart performance for "Oxytocin"
Chart (2021)	Position
US Hot Rock & Alternative Songs (Billboard)	93

== Certifications ==
Certifications and sales for "Oxytocin"
Region	Certification	Certified units/sales
Australia (ARIA)	Gold	35,000^{‡}
Brazil (Pro-Música Brasil)	2× Platinum	80,000^{‡}
Canada (Music Canada)	Platinum	80,000^{‡}
Mexico (AMPROFON)	Platinum	140,000^{‡}
New Zealand (RMNZ)	Gold	15,000^{‡}
United Kingdom (BPI)	Silver	200,000^{‡}
^{‡} Sales+streaming figures based on certification alone.
