= NDA (song) =

2021 single by Billie Eilish

Single by Billie Eilish

from the album Happier Than Ever
- Released: July 9, 2021
- Genre: Industrial; alt-pop; electropop; dark pop; progressive pop
- Length: 3:16
- Label: Darkroom; Interscope
- Songwriters: Billie Eilish; Finneas O'Connell
- Producer: Finneas

Billie Eilish singles chronology
"Lost Cause" (2021)	"NDA" (2021)	"Happier Than Ever" (2021)

Music video
- "NDA" on YouTube

"NDA" (an acronym for "non-disclosure agreement") is a song by American singer-songwriter Billie Eilish and the fifth single from her second studio album, Happier Than Ever (2021). It is an industrial, alternative pop, dark pop, electropop, and progressive pop track, which contains elements of techno-pop, trance, and trip hop, accompanied by diverse lyrical content. Inspired by her relationships, "NDA" has lyrics about Eilish's struggle with fame and fight for privacy. Additionally, the song transitions into the following album track, "Therefore I Am". Eilish wrote the song with its producer, her brother Finneas O'Connell.

The track was released by Interscope and Darkroom Records as the album's fifth single on July 9, 2021. It is the fourth song supporting the project that impacted mainstream radio in the United States. The song received mostly favorable reviews from music critics, who often called it "dark" and "pulsating". Critics acclaimed the production and vocals, but some took issue with its themes and said it was a misplacement on Happier Than Ever's track list. Commercially, the single reached the top 20 in Australia, Canada, Greece, Ireland, Lithuania, New Zealand, Norway, and the Billboard Global 200 chart. It was certified platinum in Australia, gold in Mexico and Poland, and silver in the United Kingdom.

Eilish self-directed the music video for "NDA", which depicts Eilish walking alone on a desert road as cars race around her. Critics saw the road as representing the titular non-disclosure agreement or different parts of the singer's life. Critics also said the video's atmosphere effectively accompanied the song's production and described it as dark, eerie, and moody. For further promotion, the singer performed the song numerous times for gigs like BBC Radio 1's Live Lounge, Life Is Beautiful Music & Art Festival, 2022 Coachella, and Glastonbury Festival 2022. During a 2022–2023 world tour in support of Happier Than Ever, Eilish performed the song on the stage resembling the highway road. The live rendition of the track has been featured in her concert film Happier Than Ever: A Love Letter to Los Angeles (2021).

== Background and release ==
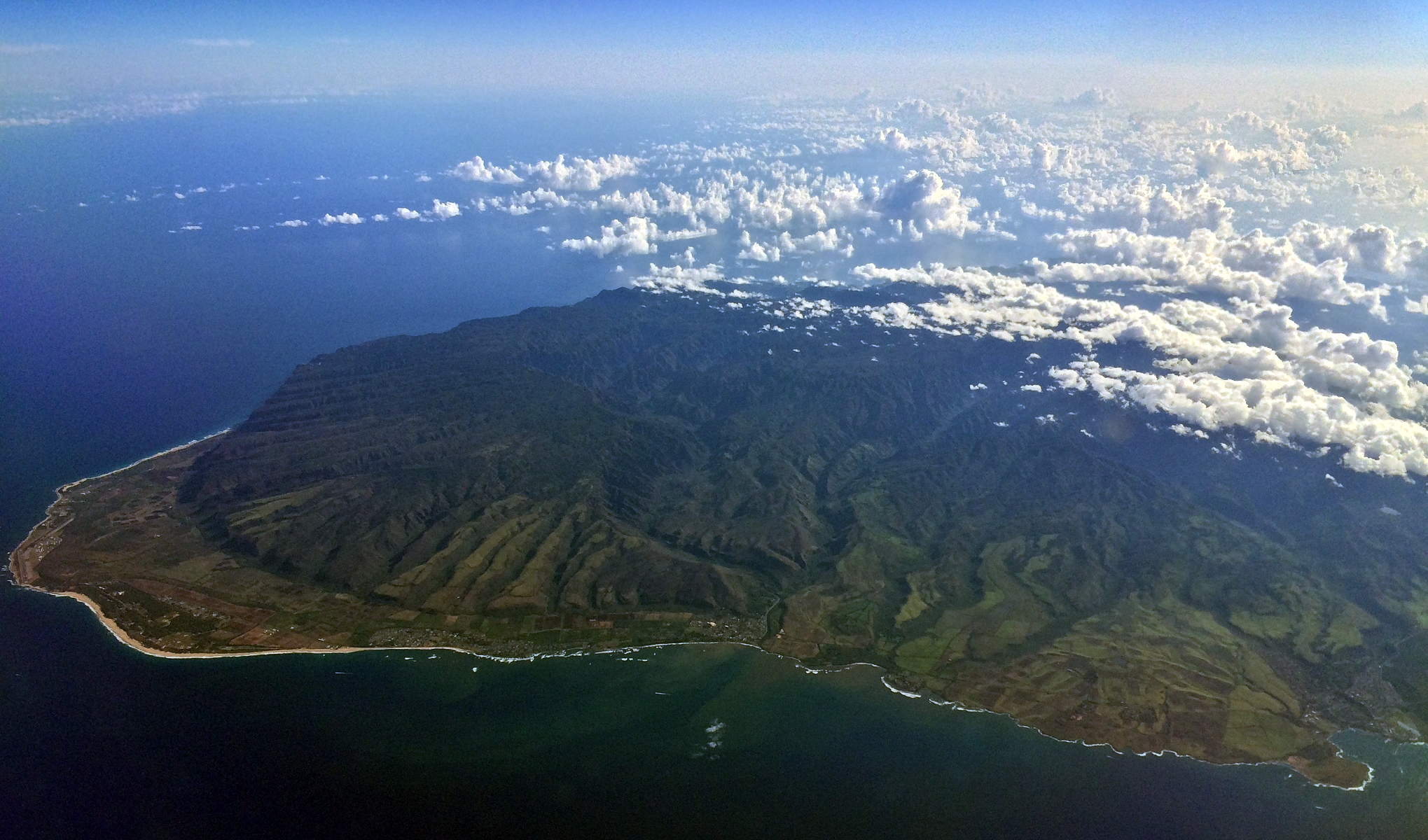
In the second verse of "NDA", Eilish mentions that she wants to pursue a "new career" in the Hawaiian island of Kauai—an island she visited in 2020.

At the age of 18, Billie Eilish won five awards at the 62nd Annual Grammy Awards held in 2020. These include Album of the Year for her debut studio album, When We All Fall Asleep, Where Do We Go? (2019). It was a commercial success, debuting at number one on many national record charts and bringing her mainstream fame. Her newly found success attracted the attention of stalkers: in 2019, the address of her family home in Los Angeles leaked online, causing three fans to show up at her house one day. One of them was an old man who had driven all the way from San Diego. That same year, a man was arrested for trespassing after appearing outside Eilish's residence seven times while "showing erratic behavior", such as by waiting for her by the front porch when told by her father that she was not home yet. A judge issued a restraining order against the man, which prevented him from trying to contact or go within a 100-meter radius of Eilish and her parents, harassing the family, or visiting Eilish's workplaces. In 2020, Billie Eilish and her family experienced stalking from another person. She filed a civil harassment restraining order against the stalker, who went by a nickname of "Adam Lucifer", on February 11, 2021, winning the case the following month. Camping by a school across from Eilish's residence, he had been sending her "extremely disturbing" letters and making throat-slitting gestures whenever they encountered each other. Eilish started fearing for her life and the well-being of her family, and she stopped feeling safe while inside her house as well as travelling outside of it. In a court statement, she wrote: "Every time I see him I just want to scream."

On April 27, 2021, Eilish announced her second studio album Happier Than Ever for release on July 30. "NDA" was announced via an Instagram post by Eilish, alongside a music video, on July 1, 2021. She additionally revealed the cover art for the single, which features double image of her. Two days before the song's release, Eilish posted a short snippet of it on Instagram. The song was released to digital download and streaming media on July 9, as the fifth single from Happier Than Ever. The same day, it was serviced to Italian radio airplay by Universal Music Group, while the UK pop-format BBC Radio 1 added it to its "A List". On July 13, the song impacted alternative and mainstream radio formats in the United States. Along with the release of the album, the lyric video of the song was uploaded to Eilish's official YouTube channel.

== Development and recording ==
"NDA" was written by Eilish and her brother Finneas O'Connell, who also served as the track's producer. It was recorded at Finneas' home recording studio, located in the basement of his Los Angeles residence. The song's production started with the sound made by Finneas that plays in between pre-chorus and chorus. Eilish wanted to use the sounds, because if not it would be a "waste" according to her. In Eilish's concert film, Happier Than Ever: A Love Letter to Los Angeles (2021), she said that the track talks about different situations, it goes "all around the place", and it is open to interpretation. She added that the recording of "NDA" did not take place in her "comfort zone", but it was therapeutic and fun for her. The singer likes the track because of its different structure. She further elaborated about the song's development process in an interview with Zane Lowe for Apple Music:

"I'm so happy that it's seeing the light of day. It came from that [does sound] We had that, we only had that. Finneas made that, just that. We were just messing around, and he just made that, and we were like, 'Oh!' And it just was that … and it was way slower and pitched down. It was really slow, this crazy... And we would just listen to it, and we would just walk around the room feeling it. And it was such a feeler. Oh my God, I kept picturing visuals for it. And I kept picturing legs, and girls and shapes, and darkness, and this cool. And I was just like, 'We have to make something to this, because this is a waste otherwise.' We literally made that whole song in two days or something, a day, I don't know. But it was a fun, satisfying-ass process. It was very, very fulfilling."

== Composition and production ==
"NDA"
A 28-second sample of the techno-pop chorus. It sees Eilish's screamy vocals, accompanied by a more aggressive and intensive beat compared to the rest of the song.

Musically, "NDA" is a minimal, pulsating, trip-hoppy, and trance-like song described as industrial, alt-pop, dark pop, electropop, and progressive pop. (Note: Sources labeling "NDA" as an industrial song: Chorus.fm, The Irish Times, and Jenesaispop; Source labeling "NDA" as an alt-pop song: Gigwise; Source labeling "NDA" as a dark-pop song: Jenesaispop; Source labeling "NDA" as an electropop song: Far Out; Source labeling "NDA" as a progressive pop song: Riff Magazine) According to the sheet music published by Universal Music Group, the song is composed in the key of G minor, and has a tempo of 85 beats per minute. Eilish's vocals span from G_{3} to D_{5}, staying in her mid-range. It begins with a distorted synth and pulsing beat. The song later features "weird plucky" guitar, "eerie" piano line, atmospheric synths, sub-bass, an electro Auto Tune, "hypnotic" couplets and refrains, and Eilish's doubled whispery vocals in a "sparse, chiming production". The bass grows more "intensive" and "aggressive" during the song's "frustrated" chorus, while Eilish screams "You couldn't save me, but you can't let me go / I can crave you, but you don't need to know" through heavily auto-tuned vocals. The chorus itself was classified by Rob Harvilla of The Ringer as "dystopian techno-pop". The song segues into the album's next track "Therefore I Am".

"NDA" has been labeled as "claustrophobic", "jittery", "prowling", "razor-sharp", "syncopated", and "thumping" by music commentary, (Note: Source labeling "NDA" as "claustrophobic" and "razor-sharp": The Sydney Morning Herald; Source labeling "NDA" as "jittery" and "syncopated": Entertainment Weekly; Source labeling "NDA" as "prowling": The Face; Source labeling "NDA" as "thumping": Vulture) with Allison Stewart from The Washington Post describing it as "twitchy club [track]". Tyler Golsen of Far Out stated that the song is a "stark and shadowy version of electro-pop" and is "closer to goth-pop" than the previous single "Lost Cause" (2021), but noted how "stylistically it stays in the same sonic sandbox". In Teen Vogue article, production of the tune was stated as its "unique sound element", while the song in whole was described as "woozier take on hyperpop". Brad Wheeler described the track as a "creepy thumper". Alex McLevy from The A.V. Club described the track as "pulsing, heartbeat-like throb". "NDA" has been compared by critics to her debut studio album When We All Fall Asleep, Where Do We Go?, and to the work of artists such as progressive rapper Kanye West, industrial rock band Nine Inch Nails, and hip hop and dance producer Timbaland. Sophie Walker of The Forty-Five opined that strings of this track are influenced by the Eastern music, and they with the "ticking metronome" create a "disorientating, otherworldly sound".

The singer's vocal delivery in the track was described as "apathetic", "emotive", half-rapping, and "hushed". Writing for Billboard, Hannah Dailey said that Eilish's distorted vocals are "engineered to sound intense"; whilst Capital FM's Savannah Roberts called her vocals "effortless", elaborating that Eilish carried the verses and allowed the poignant words to sink in. NME's Rhian Daly wrote that the song "moves between sparse, hypnotic verses and big refrains anchored by a heavy sub bass". Bardají said that the song contains an interesting contrast with its production choices, "catchy and boastful melody", and "Billie's voice in the foreground but subjected to the habitual virguerias". Walker said that the auto tune effect put on Eilish's voice "brings this glacial, nocturnal and spectacularly odd track to life."

== Lyrical content and interpretation ==
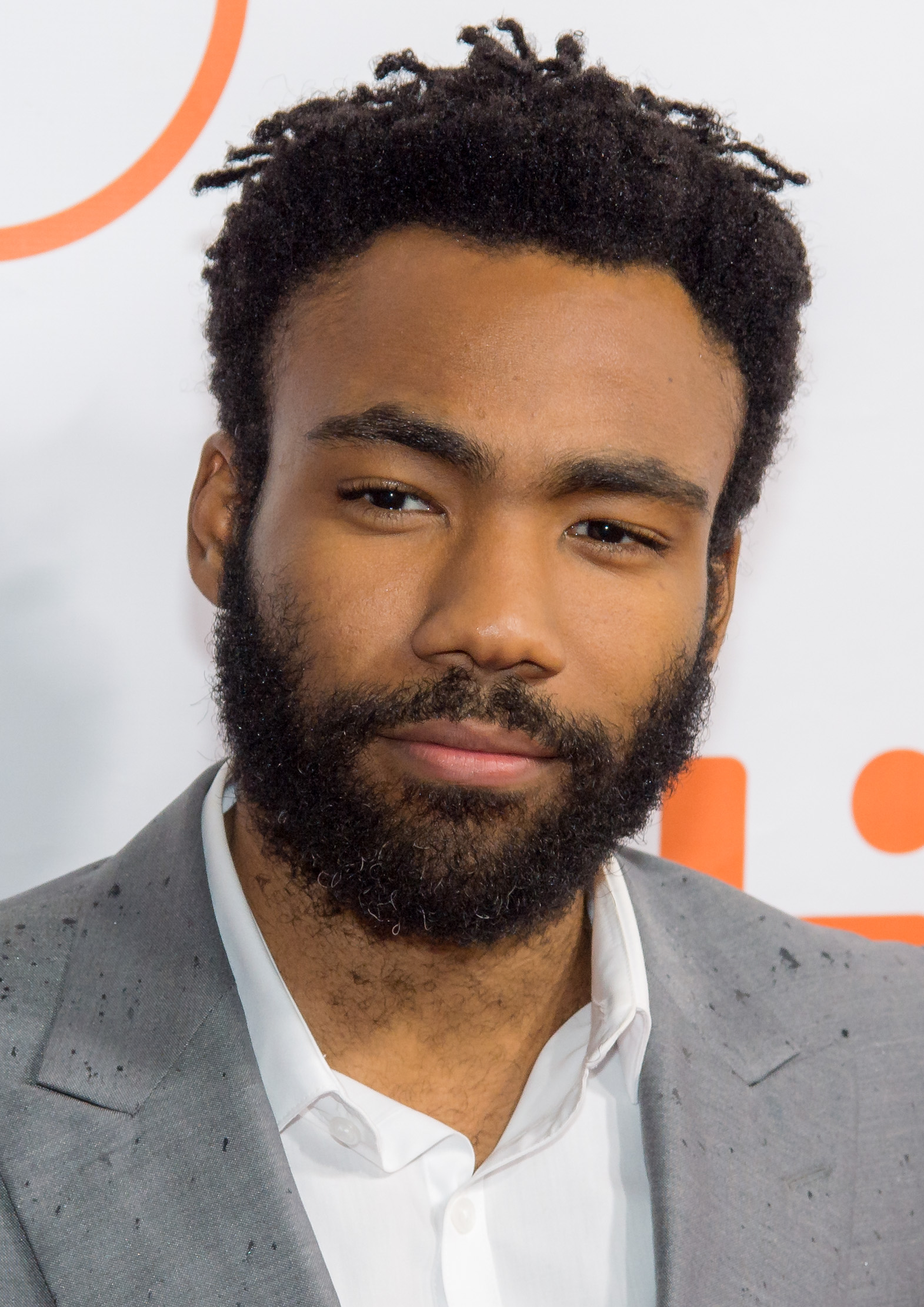
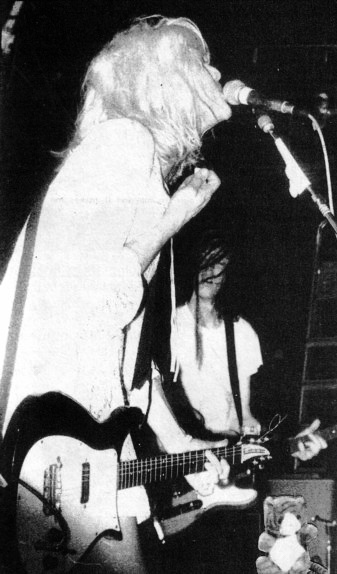
Insider's writer Callie Ahlgrim suggested that some lines from the song might refer to songs by Childish Gambino (left) and Hole (right).

Lyrically, "NDA" covers various topics. Eilish starts the song by offering a reminder of the stalking incident from 2020: "Had to save my money for security / Got a stalker walkin' up and down the street / Says he's Satan and he'd like to meet." Next, she mentions that she bought a secret house back in 2019. Eilish also presents the struggles of having a private personal life and a romantic partner due to her fame. Additionally, she sings that she had a "pretty boy" who she made sign a titular NDA—which is short for a non-disclosure agreement—to secure her private life from going public. In the second verse, Eilish addresses her fame and money, singing that after being featured in Forbes 30 Under 30, her life has been negatively impacted since she can "barely" go outside. She also shares thoughts of pursuing a new career and moving to Kauai, an island she visited in 2020. Eilish later refers to other songs from the album, such as "Getting Older", "I Didn't Change My Number", and "My Future". The singer thinks that the outro has "like eight different meanings".

The song's lyrics have been described as a "half-joke", "darkly humorous", "emotional", "barbed", and "sly". Megan Stone of Good Morning America had a different perspective on the track, describing it as "vulnerable and unsettling". In an article published by Pinkvilla, a writer suggested that the song seemingly also talks about trust, while Young Hollywood's Rebecca Breitfeller stated it is about "that life is moving too fast and too many things are coming at [Eilish] from all angles". The Sydney Morning Herald's Giselle Au-Nhien Nguyen said that "NDA" depicts "strangeness of being a young woman under such intense scrutiny". Jon Dolan of Rolling Stone opinied this tracks is about "life as a disconnected blur of new-fame isolation."

== Critical reception ==
Gigwise's Vicky Greer deemed Eilish to be "returning to the darker alt-pop" with "NDA", similarly to how Roberts opined that the song further tapped into Billie's experimental vein. Mike DeWald of Riff Magazine called it an "urgent wall-of-sound anthem". Chris Willman from Variety felt the single "seems more like an offbeat album track" and it is "good to get her more unnerving side back, in full, uneasy bloom". Tom Breihan of Stereogum wrote that the song contains a "playfulness that's mostly lacking on the album" and that it is "one of the few moments where Happier Than Ever really crackles to life". Ellen Peirson-Hagger of the New Statesman compared its tone and vocal delivery to "Billie Bossa Nova", describing them as "sighing". For musicOMH, John Murphy pointed out that "NDA" and "Lost Cause" sound like "future classics". The Forty-Five's Emma Holbrook called the song's title line as one of the darkest lyrics of the album. Writing for Hot Press, Peter O'Neill said that certain lyrics "highlight the moody feeling of the track". Robin Murray from Clash said that it is "delicately composed"; while Sarah El-Mahmoud of CinemaBlend called the song "brooding" and "well orchestrated" with "intense back beat", as well as labeling the subject matter "interesting", however admitting that it did not "blow [her] mind".

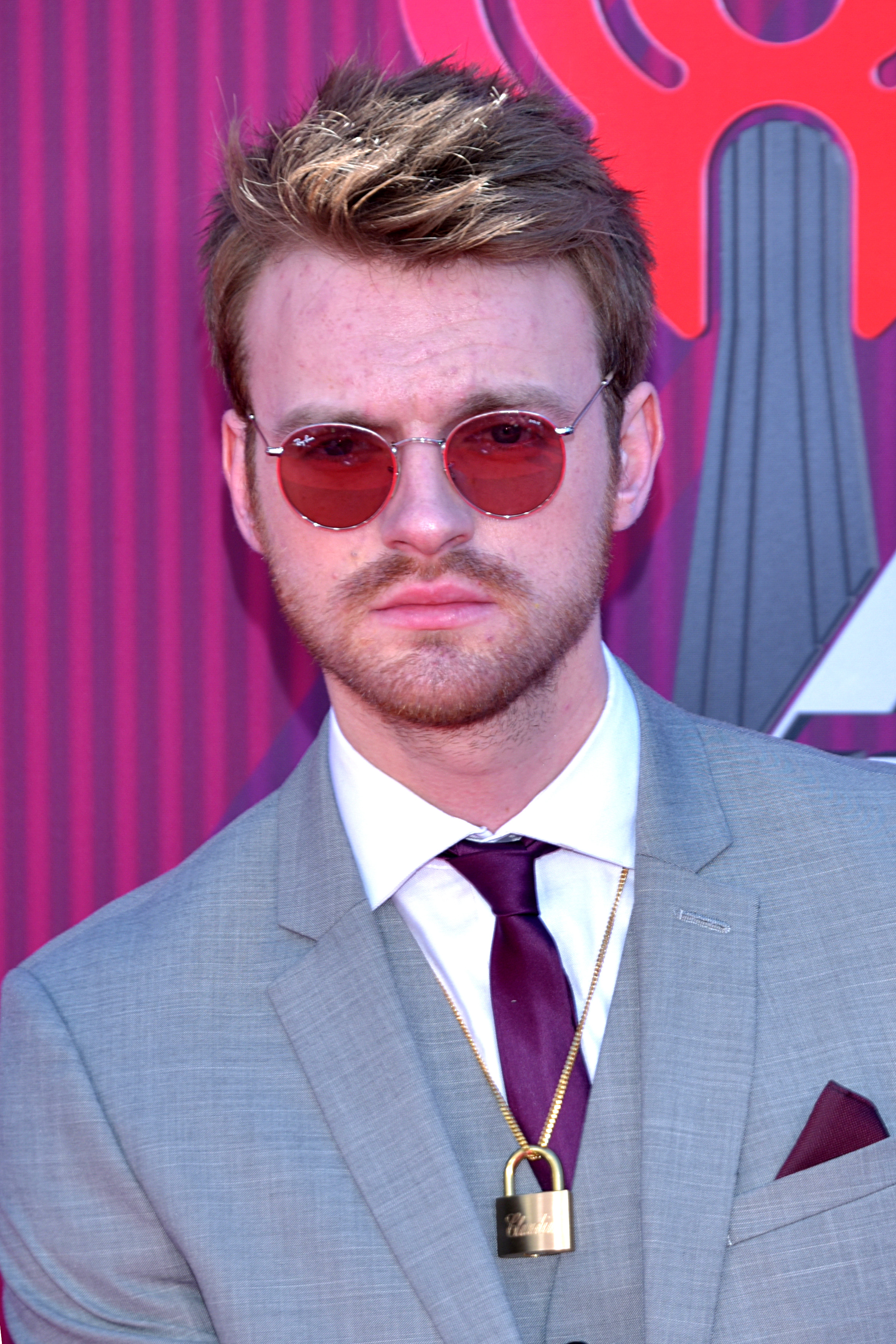
Production by Finneas O'Connell (pictured) in "NDA" was acclaimed by some music critics. (Note: As identified by these sources: Hollywood.com, and Young Hollywood.)

"NDA" was praised by respective editors of The Wall Street Journal and Hollywood.com, with Mark Richardson commenting "[Eilish's] hushed voice and muted phrasing need the contrast these grittier and noisier tracks provide"; while Sam Persall said that it is a "perfect accompaniment to the previously released Happier Than Ever singles" because of its diverse lyrics. Persall also described Finneas' production as "killer" and "superb", while opining that Eilish's vocal performance is "unworldly". Breitfeller was positive, naming the track one of her favorite Eilish's releases, calling it "extremely bouncy[,] catchy", and "chaotic". She also opined that the song features one of the "coolest" productions on the album. At Chorus.fm, Adam Grundy highlighted Finneas production skills in "NDA", saying that they improved since the last projects he has been involved; while Aaron Mook suggested that the song is a good mixture of Eilish's first studio album with "something new". Bardají called the track "excellent". In an article published at The Ringer, "NDA" was called "hit"-sounding and its chorus was praised for being "heavy-hitting". Golsen praised the song, saying that "with a darker, almost creeper beat and near-whispered lyrics, 'NDA' shows off what Billie does best and builds up in tension and raw emotion as the song goes on". For The New York Times, Lindsay Zoladz complimented the song, saying that is "one of the most compelling songs on the album". Alberto Aramburu from Holr Magazine praised the singer since "NDA" proves "[Eilish] keeps giving it all on her creativity [and] performance". In an analysis published at Chorus.fm, Mary Varvaris said that "NDA" has an "excellent" transition into "Therefore I Am" and that they "[complement] side-by-side and on the album". E!'s writer Lindsay Weinberg described "NDA" as "dark glam glory".

On more critical note, William said that because the song is full of details it "should make [Eilish] less relatable", however "counterintuitively, it has the opposite effect". McLevy criticized the fact that "Everybody Dies", "Your Power", and "NDA" are placed next to each other because "following one another, they feel jarring, as though Eilish and her brother couldn't bear to leave such quality material in the studio, regardless of how inelegantly they work when placed together". Oppositely, Zoladz called the song, and its followers, a "strong closing stretch". Insider's Callie Ahlgrim and Courteney Larocca gave the song a mostly unfavorable review, with Ahlgrim contemplating her "want to like this song more than" she did. While giving praise to the guitars placed in the song's pre-chorus, she found its release as a single a "mistake", explaining, "If you're going to prerelease a sizable chunk of your album, you better make sure it doesn't sound like well-worn terrain, or an obstacle on the way to shinier toys." Larocca liked references to other album tracks in "NDA", but she was critical of the tone of the song, saying that "Eilish sounds dispassionate throughout, prohibiting the song from exhibiting any real emotional pull".

=== Lists ===
Jackson Langford of MTV Australia put "NDA" on the third place of his list compiling of every Eilish songs, where he wrote that even though the track is not relatable, it "doesn't alienate." He also compared it to previous Happier Than Ever singles, "My Future" (2020) and "Your Power", saying that unlike those "NDA" is an "all-out onslaught of fiery emotion as she reckons with fame's intense repercussions." Walker placed the single on the tenth position of her worst-to-best list of the artist's songs. On Rolling Stone-published ranking of the singer's 20 best songs, "NDA" was put on number 16, with Dolan opining that it is the "tensely humming track, with its water-torture string plucks and meat-cleaver snare thwumps, amps up the sense of claustrophobic desperation, as Eilish's bleary voice tries to break through, hungering for the freedom she's earned and deserves." Writing for Uproxx, Rachel Brodsky placed the track on number 19 of all Eilish songs ranked, where she added that "[l]istening to the pulsating 'NDA' is even a little stressful, but it’s probably nothing compared to what its author experiences on a daily basis." Dailey was more critical of "NDA", hence she placed it at number 13 in her ranking of worst-to-best songs of Happier Than Ever, explaining that the song is a "fairly unrelatable song about what it takes to have a relationship and personal life when you're an ultra-famous celebrity". Rolling Stone India's Amit Vaidya listed it among the worst songs of 2021, saying that "sticks out like a sore thumb". The writer suggested that this song would have "worked better on an album or two later", hence now it feels "unnecessary."

== Commercial performance ==
Similarly to two previous Happier Than Ever singles, "NDA" achieved moderate commercial success, which have not meet some fans expectations, resulting in calling it her "flop era". The singer addressed those allegations in a TikTok video, suggesting trolls to "eat [her] dust", with "NDA" playing in the background. According to MRC Data, in the week ending July 22, 2021, "NDA" was the 87th most-streamed song in the United States, while Hits reported that during its debut radio week, the song became the third most added track to pop panels. It resulted in the song's placement in the top 40 on the Billboard Hot 100, as the fifth consecutive single of the album to do so; "NDA" debuted and peaked at number 39 on a chart issue July 24. The song slipped to number 75 the following week, and rebounded two weeks later to position 59, receiving "Biggest Streaming Gain" award. A week later, it was one of two songs from Happier Than Ever that stayed on the Hot 100, logging position 77. (Note: The other song that remained on the chart was "Happier Than Ever" at number 13.) Additionally, the song peaked at number 25 on Mainstream Top 40. Also, it charted within top 20 in other Billboard charts, peaking at number 18 on the Canadian Hot 100 and at number 20 on both global charts—Global 200 and Global Excl. U.S. "NDA" was certified gold by Asociación Mexicana de Productores de Fonogramas y Videogramas (AMPROFON) for moving 70,000 copies in Mexico.

Unlike previous Happier Than Ever singles, "NDA" missed top 20 on the UK Singles Chart, peaking at number 23. On August 25, 2023, it was certified silver by British Phonographic Industry (BPI) for shipping 200,000 copies in the country. Elsewhere in Europe, the song peaked within top 20 of countries such as Greece, Ireland and Norway, logging at numbers 19, 13, and 16, while Lithuania is the only country where the single hit the top 10—it peaked at number 10. In Oceania, the song also was placed in top 20 of Australia and New Zealand. In the former, "NDA" appeared at number 16 on the ARIA Singles Chart, before falling off the chart after two weeks. After the album's release, the song re-entered the ARIA Singles Charts at number 36. In the latter, the single logging position 14. "NDA" was certified platinum by Australian Recording Industry Association (ARIA) and Polish Society of the Phonographic Industry (ZPAV) for selling 70,000 and 50,000 copies in Australia and Poland, respectively.

== Music video ==
=== Background and synopsis ===
Eilish falls on her knees during the song's second chorus; she later shared the pictures of her bruised knees.

The music video for "NDA" was directed by Eilish and recorded on June 1, 2021. It was uploaded on her official YouTube channel on July 9, 2021, at 12 am Eastern Time. In an interview with Apple Music, Eilish revealed the original concept for the music video was scrapped due to complications. However, Eilish admitted that it is one of "the coolest" videos she directed. According to Entertainment Weekly, the clip was recorded on one take, with no doubles nor special effects. The day after the video was published, Eilish posted behind-the-scenes content on her Instagram, featuring clips of recording the video, pictures of the bruises on her knees after she fell, and her mother Maggie Baird's reaction to the fall.

The one-shot video features Eilish walking at a dark night on a dimly lit desert road, wearing black clothes. While the song's verses are playing, a group of shadow figures follow behind her, but when she looks behind her, they disappear. Additionally, the clip features numerous images of the artist's face in foreground played several times throughout the verses. During the chorus, 25 stunt drivers race around the singer, creating clouds of tire smoke. At one point in the video, she falls on her knees. The music video ends with an exhausted Eilish knowingly staring into the camera.

=== Analysis and reception ===
Althea Legaspi of Rolling Stone likened the trust between Eilish and the drivers to that associated with a non-disclosure agreement, after which the song is named; whilst Breitfeller said that the cars cause chaos to "most likely represent the chaos and hardships represented in the song". Pure Charts' Yohann Ruelle suggested it might symbolize "constant pressure she faces, even harassment from the paparazzi"; while Stone proposed that the cars may be symbolizing the singer's "distress". In an article published by Pinkvilla, the two-way street featured in the video was seen as the representation of "trust and love".

Variety's Chris Willman saw the music video as a continuation of Eilish's "trademark mordant humor and blunt language". Nicholas Rice of People called the visual "moody", while Ruth Samuel from the Los Angeles Times labeled it "eerie", adding "engulfed in clouds of smoke as dozens of cars race past her, Billie Eilish puts a literal spin on life". Ruelle called it "shocking"; whereas CinemaBlend's Sarah El-Mahmoud said that since the video has "some seriously dangerous practical set pieces", Eilish can be "respected" for it. Josh Chesler of Spin called the visual "high-octane" and "appropriate" for a "decidedly dark track" like "NDA". In an article published by Paper, the video was called "fun" and "Hollywood-themed"; while iHeartRadio Canada's John R. Kennedy named it "daring" and "dark". Besides calling it "dark", Breitfeller said the video "particular[ly] feels very honest and emotional", and that the cars featured in it are not only a "wonderful metaphor", but also "visually extremely entertaining". Bardají dubbed the video as the singer's "darkest" visual yet, and opined that scenes where her face is the main focus are in "her style, but a little bit Björk". The video reached almost 12 million views on YouTube in three days.

== Live performances ==
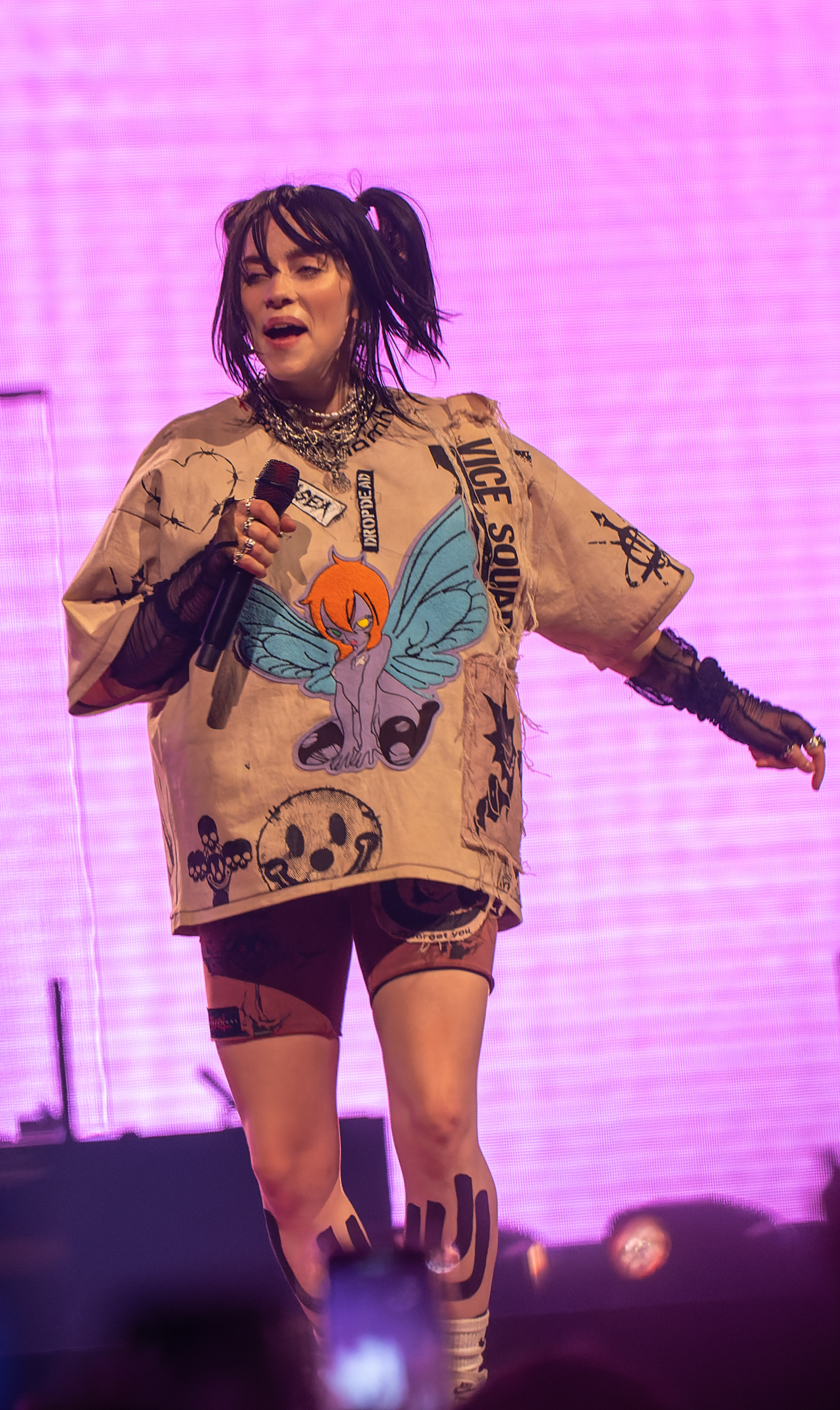
Eilish performed "NDA" during the Happier Than Ever, The World Tour (2022–2023).

On July 16, 2021, an in-studio live performance of the song was uploaded to Eilish's YouTube channel. Besides Eilish, the video featured her brother, Finneas, playing synths and Andrew Marshall on drums. One day before the album's release, she performed "NDA" and "Billie Bossa Nova" on German program Unserding. On August 5, 2021, Eilish performed a five-song in BBC Radio 1's Live Lounge that included "NDA", alongside other album tracks and a cover of Frances Langford's "I'm in the Mood for Love". Next month, the singer released her concert film entitled Happier Than Ever: A Love Letter to Los Angeles, which featured a performance of the song. On September 20, Eilish performed "NDA" at Life Is Beautiful Music & Art Festival in front of 180,000 fans.

In 2022, Eilish embarked on a world tour that started on February 3, 2022, in New Orleans at Smoothie King Center and finished on September 30, 2022, at Perth Arena, in support of Happier Than Ever, where she performed "NDA" after "I Didn't Change My Number", before she transitioned into "Therefore I Am". During the song's performance, the stage changed into the highway road and backdrops displayed cars, reminiscent of the single's music video. The tour included gigs on such festivals as Coachella and Glastonbury. The singer shared footage of the performance of "NDA" from the former festival on her official YouTube channel.

== Credits and personnel ==
- Billie Eilish – vocals, songwriting, vocal engineering
- Finneas O'Connell – songwriting, production, drum programming, engineering, percussion, synth bass, synthesizer, vocal arrangement
- Dave Kutch – mastering
- Rob Kinelski – mixing
- Casey Cuayo – mixing assistant
- Eli Heisler – mixing assistant
- Nick Rives – immersive mix engineering

== Charts ==
=== Weekly charts ===
Weekly chart performance for "NDA"
Chart (2021)	Peak position
Australia (ARIA)	16
Austria (Ö3 Austria Top 40)	31
Canada Hot 100 (Billboard)	18
Canada CHR/Top 40 (Billboard)	43
Canada Rock (Billboard)	49
Czech Republic Singles Digital (ČNS IFPI)	36
France (SNEP)	104
Germany (GfK)	35
Global 200 (Billboard)	20
Greece International (IFPI)	19
Hungary (Stream Top 40)	34
Iceland (Tónlistinn)	35
Ireland (IRMA)	13
Lithuania (AGATA)	10
Netherlands (Single Top 100)	55
New Zealand (Recorded Music NZ)	14
Norway (VG-lista)	16
Portugal (AFP)	33
Singapore (RIAS)	25
Slovakia (Singles Digitál Top 100)	31
Sweden (Sverigetopplistan)	25
Switzerland (Schweizer Hitparade)	27
UK Singles (Official Charts)	23
US Billboard Hot 100	39
US Hot Rock & Alternative Songs (Billboard)	3
US Pop Airplay (Billboard)	25
US Rock & Alternative Airplay (Billboard)	33
US Rolling Stone Top 100	23

=== Year-end charts ===
Year-end chart performance for "NDA"
Chart (2021)	Position
US Hot Rock & Alternative Songs (Billboard)	30

== Certifications ==
Certifications for "NDA"
Region	Certification	Certified units/sales
Australia (ARIA)	Platinum	70,000^{‡}
Austria (IFPI Austria)	Gold	15,000^{‡}
Brazil (Pro-Música Brasil)	2× Platinum	80,000^{‡}
Canada (Music Canada)	2× Platinum	160,000^{‡}
France (SNEP)	Gold	100,000^{‡}
Mexico (AMPROFON)	Gold	70,000^{‡}
New Zealand (RMNZ)	Platinum	30,000^{‡}
Poland (ZPAV)	Platinum	50,000^{‡}
United Kingdom (BPI)	Silver	200,000^{‡}
^{‡} Sales+streaming figures based on certification alone.

== Release history ==
Release dates and formats for "NDA"
Region	Date	Format(s)	Label(s)	Ref.
Various	July 9, 2021	Digital download; streaming	Darkroom; Interscope	
Italy	July 9, 2021	Radio airplay	Universal	
United States	July 13, 2021	Alternative radio; contemporary hit radio	Darkroom; Interscope	
