= Happier Than Ever =

2021 studio album by Billie Eilish

Studio album by Billie Eilish
- Released: July 30, 2021
- Recorded: Late July 2019 – February 2021
- Studios: Finneas's home studio (Los Angeles, California)
- Genres: Electropop; jazz pop
- Length: 56:07
- Labels: Darkroom; Interscope
- Producer: Finneas O'Connell

Billie Eilish chronology
| Live at Third Man Records (2019) | Happier Than Ever (2021) | Guitar Songs (2022) |

Singles from Happier Than Ever
- 1. "My Future" Released: July 30, 2020; 2. "Therefore I Am" Released: November 12, 2020; 3. "Your Power" Released: April 29, 2021; 4. "Lost Cause" Released: June 2, 2021; 5. "NDA" Released: July 9, 2021; 6. "Happier Than Ever" Released: July 30, 2021; 7. "Male Fantasy" Released: December 6, 2021

Happier Than Ever is the second studio album by American singer-songwriter Billie Eilish, released by Darkroom and Interscope Records on July 30, 2021. Eilish co-wrote the album with her brother and frequent collaborator Finneas O'Connell, who also produced the album and played every instrument. Eilish cited self-reflection during the COVID-19 pandemic as the biggest inspiration for the record.

Primarily a downtempo pop record, Happier Than Ever is characterized by sparse, jazz-influenced, electropop arrangements set to meditative tempos, departing from the upbeat, trap-led sound of Eilish's debut album, When We All Fall Asleep, Where Do We Go? (2019). Consisting of torch songs about the downsides of stardom, Happier Than Ever draws heavily from Eilish's rise to fame and the drawbacks that come with it. Upon release, the album received acclaim from music critics, who praised its stylistic, restrained production, and insightful lyrics. At the 64th Annual Grammy Awards, the album and its title track received a total of seven nominations, including Album of the Year, Best Pop Vocal Album, Song of the Year and Record of the Year.

Seven singles were released in promotion of the album: "My Future", "Therefore I Am", "Your Power", "Lost Cause", "NDA", the title track, and "Male Fantasy"; the first three peaked within the top 10 of the US Billboard Hot 100. "Therefore I Am" was the highest-charting song from the album, peaking at number two, followed by "My Future" at number six, and "Your Power" at number 10. Happier Than Ever debuted atop the Billboard 200 as Eilish's second number-one album in the United States, and topping the album charts in 27 other countries. Eilish performed the album's tracks in the Disney+ concert film, Happier Than Ever: A Love Letter to Los Angeles, which was released in September 2021. To further promote the album, Eilish embarked on her sixth concert tour, Happier Than Ever, The World Tour, from February 2022 to April 2023.

== Background and recording ==
Eilish released her debut album When We All Fall Asleep, Where Do We Go? (which was also produced by her brother Finneas O'Connell) on March 29, 2019. It was met with critical acclaim and commercial success, and spawned the Billboard Hot 100-topping single "Bad Guy", her first number-one on the chart. The album and the single helped Eilish win five awards at the 62nd Annual Grammy Awards, including the "big four" Album of the Year, Song of the Year, Record of the Year, and Best New Artist. Eilish released a number of singles since the album: the stand-alone "Everything I Wanted" (2019), the James Bond theme song "No Time to Die" (2020), and the Rosalía collaboration "Lo Vas a Olvidar" (2021), the first two of which won Record of the Year and Best Song Written for Visual Media at the 63rd Grammy Awards, respectively. In a January 2020 interview, Eilish stated she would begin working on her upcoming second studio album during the year. In March, Finneas confirmed this, stating that it would be "pretty pure in its intention" like Eilish's debut, with the two continuing to make the type of music they like to "play live". In January 2021, Eilish stated that the album "feels exactly how I want it to", with her not wanting to change a single thing about it. Her documentary film, Billie Eilish: The World's a Little Blurry, was released the following month. Later in February, Eilish announced the album would have 16 tracks.

Happier Than Ever was recorded at Finneas's home recording studio, located in the basement of his Los Angeles residence. According to Eilish, recording took place between April 1, 2020, and February 16, 2021, in weekly schedules, starting with "My Future" and ending with "Oxytocin". The title track was the first song she wrote from the record, dating back to the European leg of her When We All Fall Asleep Tour. Eilish revealed that all of 16 songs on the final track listing were the only songs the duo worked on during the album's creation, yet there were two songs, namely "What I Wanna Hear" and "Born Blue", that were omitted from the record since she "just couldn't figure them out". In 2024, the singer released "Blue" as the concluding track of her next studio album Hit Me Hard and Soft, which is a mash-up of "Born Blue" and another unreleased song "True Blue".

Eilish has revealed that the creative process of Happier Than Ever felt "very natural", unlike her previous projects where she constantly felt anxious and under pressure. With earlier works, Eilish also felt that she was not good enough and simply was not talented, but has since gained much more confidence in her craft. According to Eilish, her record label did not have any input on the album, unlike her debut album where she felt pressure from deadlines, constant meetings and "an expectation that a star was about to be born", all of which she "literally hated".

In an interview with Vevo, Eilish said that she wanted to create "a very timeless record", mostly being inspired by jazz singers that she listened to growing up such as Julie London, Peggy Lee and Frank Sinatra. She also said that the songs on the album are "all over the place and very, I think, versatile, different to one another, but also very cohesive," which she cited as one of her biggest goals. Another one of her goals she had during studio sessions was to surprise her fans as well as herself. She aimed to be uncomfortable during the creative process, using "NDA" as an example of a song that was not made in her "comfort zone". Eilish cited self-reflection as the biggest muse behind the record, and revealed before its release that "almost none of the songs on this album are joyful", despite its title. She noted "Male Fantasy" as a song that "pretty much wrote itself" and helped her realize feelings she had not processed before.

== Music and lyrics ==
Musically, Happier Than Ever is a subdued, downtempo-influenced pop, electropop, and jazz-pop record, incorporating elements of R&B, techno, country, bossa nova, bedroom pop, trip hop, folk, electro, trap, and 1990s sophisti-pop. It consists of torch songs set to slow tempos, with restrained, minimalistic arrangements of acoustic guitars, delicate synthesizers, and burbling beats. The lyrics deal with struggles faced by young women in the entertainment industry, fame, stardom, emotional abuse, power struggles, mistrust, and misogyny, imbued by Eilish's self-consciousness. In Robert Christgau's opinion, Eilish's songwriting had inspired Finneas to devise a sound for the album that is "calmer and less sprightly" than her earlier breakthrough work.

=== Songs ===
The opening track, "Getting Older", is a song about abuse and was "particularly harrowing" to write. The song deals with sexual coercion. The second track, "I Didn't Change My Number", features a heavy beat. "Billie Bossa Nova", the third track, presents "a more mature side of Eilish". The fourth track, "My Future", starts as a slow synth ballad that "transitions into a laidback funk groove". Lyrically, the song is about self-discovery. "Oxytocin", the fifth track, has a techno pulse. The song references the titular hormone. The sixth track, "Goldwing", loops its a capella introduction throughout the song. The eighth track, "Halley's Comet", is a ballad featuring stripped-back vocals, light synths, and a backbeat. The ninth track, "Not My Responsibility", is a spoken word interlude with an ambient instrumental that debuted on Eilish's Where Do We Go? World Tour (2020).

The interlude then transitions into the tenth track, "Overheated", which samples the production of its predecessor and explores stardom in the era of social media. The eleventh track "Everybody Dies", is a downtempo alt-pop ballad, driven by dark synths and light guitar strumming, with "Eilish's voice again standing out". The twelfth track, "Your Power", is a soft acoustic ballad about sexual abuse and being taken advantage of by your partner. The thirteenth track, "NDA" discusses the lack of privacy in her life due to her rise in fame over a dark electropop beat which transitions into the fourteenth track "Therefore I Am", which is lyrically about dismissing the haters and critics. The fifteenth track, "Happier Than Ever", is a rock opera song. It has been described as "a mopey breakup song", before breaking into "an electric-guitar-driven rager", while the rest of the tracks "bare different kinds of catharsis, teetering between sexy, electronic beats and warm folkiness, reminiscent of her earliest music." It has been dubbed an album highlight. The album closes with "Male Fantasy", a slow-tempo ballad that finds Billie reflecting on relationships and sexual growth.

== Release and promotion ==
=== Marketing ===
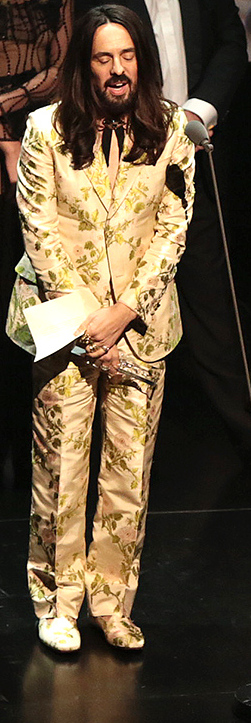
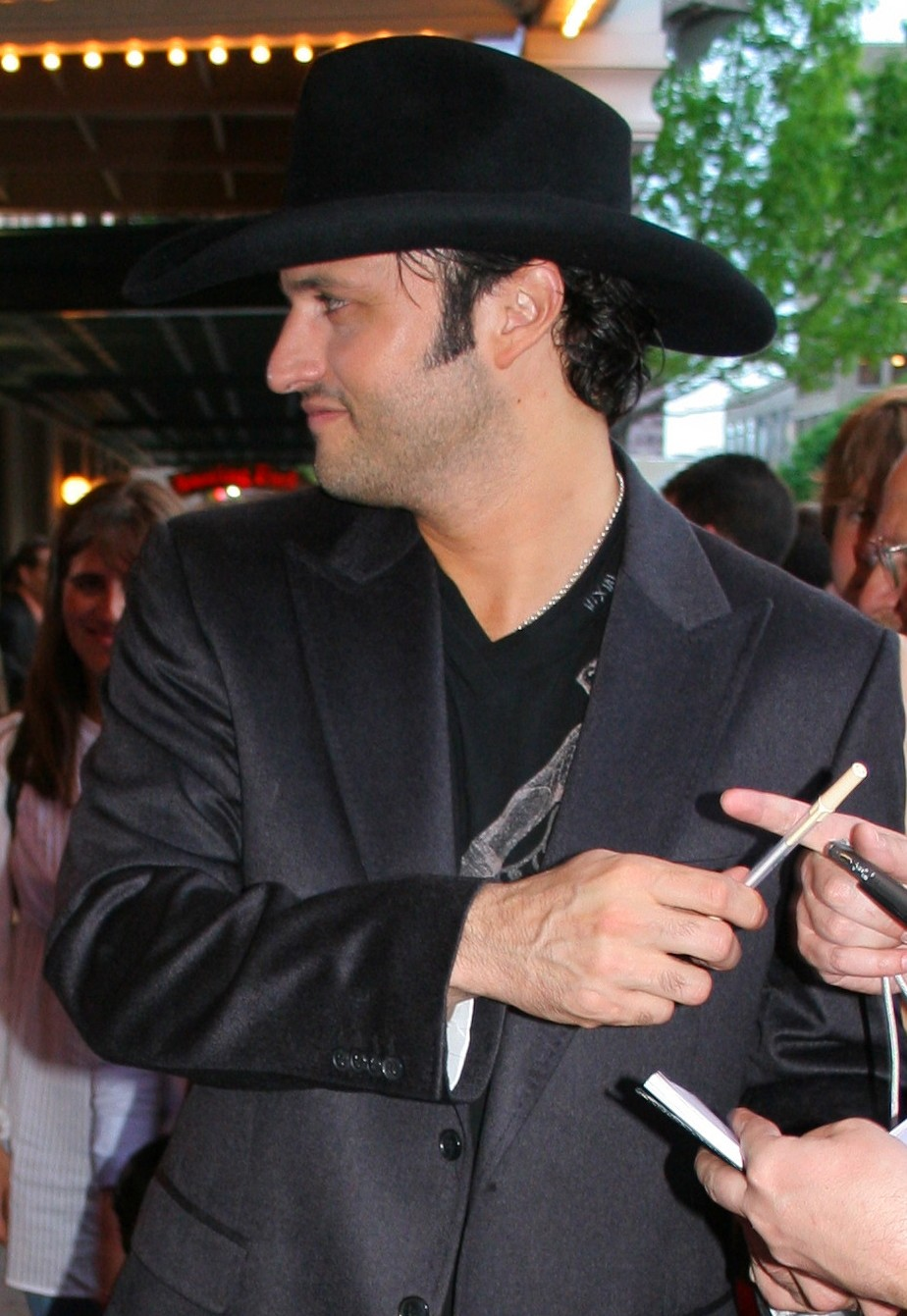
Alessandro Michele (left) designed a box and nail stickers for limited Gucci edition of the album, while Robert Rodriguez (right) co-directed the concert film Happier Than Ever: A Love Letter to Los Angeles.

On April 26, 2021, Eilish began hinting at upcoming music, and revealed the title, Happier Than Ever, in an Instagram post on April 26, including a 15-second snippet of the title track, which had been previously teased in the documentary film. The following day, Eilish announced Happier Than Ever as the album title, after billboards announcing its title and release date reportedly began appearing in various cities. Happier Than Ever was released on July 30, 2021. It was available in a variety of physical album formats, such as eight differently colored vinyl LPs, including retail-exclusives for Amazon, independent record stores, Target, Urban Outfitters and Walmart, ten CD variants, including autographed CDs at independent stores, a version with alternate packaging hand-painted by Eilish, three premium box sets, a Target-exclusive edition packaged with a poster, and multiple cassette tape variants, including a deluxe box set.

On December 2, Eilish announced that she has teamed up with Italian fashion house Gucci for an eco-friendly limited vinyl edition of Happier Than Ever. The set was released the following day, featuring vinyls created entirely from leftover recycled materials gathered during the original pressing of the record and a Gucci-branded nail stickers. The box and stickers were designed by the brand's creative director Alessandro Michele. Additionally, the collector's edition was sold in a physical Gucci stores throughout the world. The cover of this edition has a "psychedelic pattern" in the background. Next month, during the 30th anniversary of Interscope Records, the label announced a museum exhibit, Artists Inspired by Music: Interscope Reimagined, featuring new cover arts of the projects released by the label. Those artworks were featured on the limited vinyl release. Happier Than Ever new cover was designed by American artist Lisa Yuskavage.

Eilish appeared on the cover of June 2021 issue of British Vogue, wearing a corset. The photoshoot provoked polarizing reactions. The singer also were interviewed for that magazine, and also for such publications as the Guardian and Rolling Stone. To support the album in the United Kingdom, a television special titled Billie Eilish: Up Close was broadcast on BBC One on July 31, in tandem with Eilish's debut on the BBC Live Lounge. All of the album's tracks received lyric videos on YouTube upon its release. For the first anniversary of the album's release, Eilish shared voice memos of her recording takes for "Billie Bossa Nova", "Lost Cause", "Your Power", the title track, and "Male Fantasy".

=== Live performances ===
On June 16, 2021, Eilish performed a 27-minute set on Prime Day Show, including renditions of first four singles from Happier Than Ever, "All the Good Girls Go to Hell", and "Everything I Wanted". The set was later released on Amazon Music to download and streaming as a digital EP. The artist partnered with an American video hosting service Vevo to create a series of "Official Vevo Live Performances" in promotion of Happier Than Ever. Four renditions of the album's songs were published on the singer's official YouTube account; in chronogical order: "Your Power" on July 18, "Male Fantasy" on August 4, "Lost Cause" on October 21, and "Billie Bossa Nova" on January 13, 2022. Two additional in-studio performances were uploaded to Eilish's channel, namely "NDA" on July 16, 2021, and an acoustic rendition of "Billie Bossa Nova" on December 20.

On May 8, 2023, a live recording of the song from Billie's set at Lollapalooza Brazil 2023 during the Latin America leg of Happier Than Ever, The World Tour was uploaded to her channel. It was the third live concert performance from the album to ever be published on her channel, following "NDA (Live at Coachella)" and "I Didn't Change My Number (Apple Music Live 2022)". The choice to record and publish the live version of the song performed in the country is likely related to Brazil's cultural influences on the song itself. When the song begins, Eilish says "This song is because of you!", referencing her Brazilian audience at the festival.

On July 29, 2021, Eilish appeared on German program Undersing, where she performed "NDA" and "Billie Bossa Nova". On August 5, the singer appeared in BBC Radio 1's Live Lounge with a 4-song set consisting of "Getting Older", "I Didn't Change My Number", "NDA", and a cover of Frances Langford's "I'm in the Mood for Love". Next month, she was on gigs such as iHeartRadio Music Festival and Life Is Beautiful Music & Art Festival, where she performed some of the album's tracks. The same month, she also performed "Getting Older" and "Billie Bossa Nova" for ABC. In November, Eilish was featured in Sesame Street, where she gave an alternate rendition of the title track with Count von Count. The following month, the artist was performing a double duty in Saturday Night Live of the show's host and musical guest, in addition to various sketches, she performed "Happier Than Ever" and "Male Fantasy" in a scenery nodding to the tracks' music videos. To mark the album's one-year anniversary, Eilish and Finneas held performances at the Amoeba Music record store in Hollywood. The setlist included "Getting Older", "Billie Bossa Nova", and the title track. They also performed "TV", which is part of her second extended play Guitar Songs.

=== Concerts ===
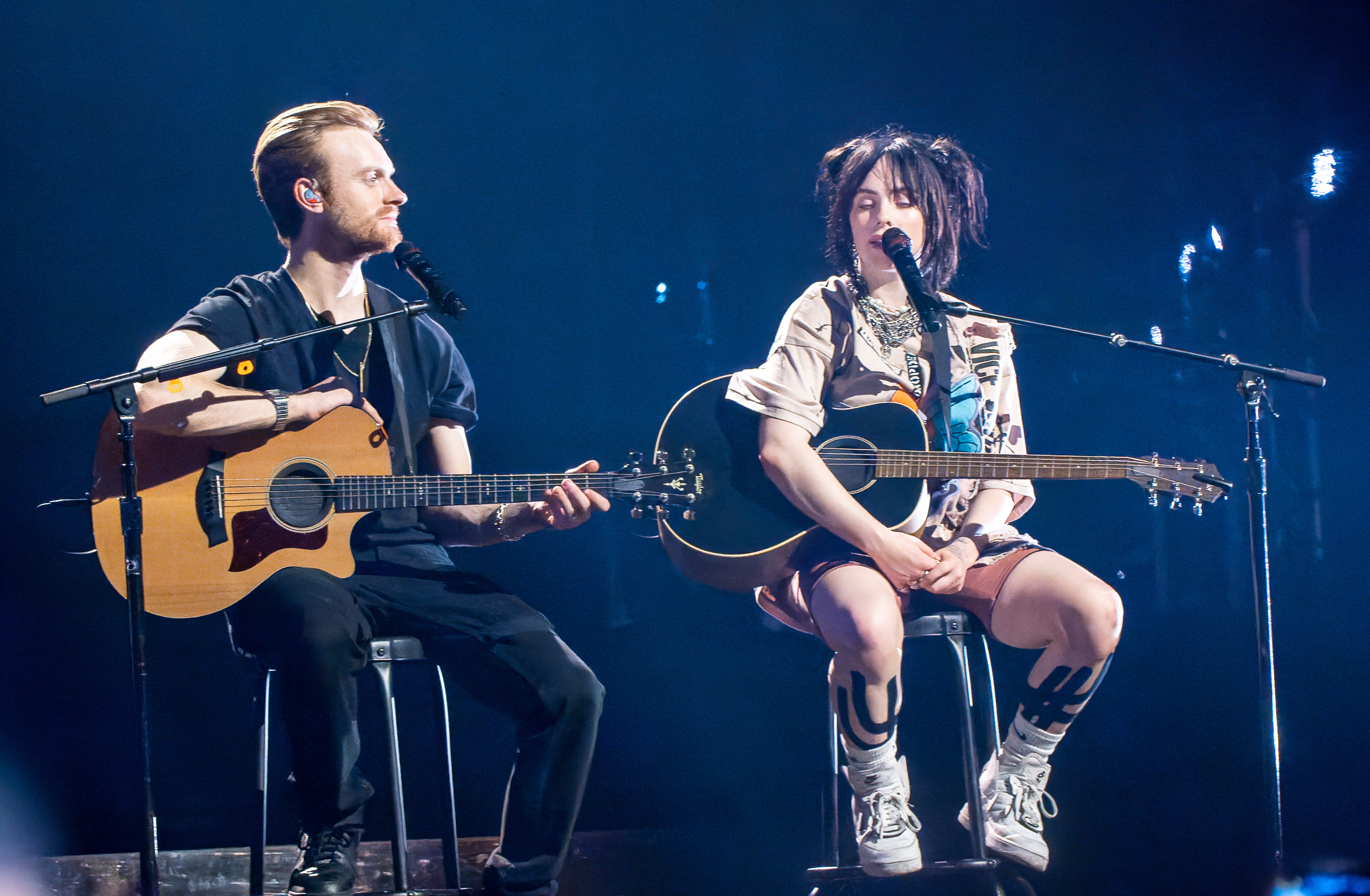
Billie Eilish and Finneas O'Connell performing during the album's associated world tour (2022–2023)

On July 22, 2021, Eilish teased a concert film that featured performances of all 16 tracks from the album, set for an exclusive release to Disney+ on September 3, 2021. Titled Happier Than Ever: A Love Letter to Los Angeles, it was directed by Robert Rodriguez and Patrick Osborne, and it features live action scenes blended with animation. The concert took place at the Hollywood Bowl without a live audience due to the COVID-19 pandemic; additional scenes were recorded at various landmarks around Los Angeles. Critics praised the film's performances, which they felt were of similar or better quality compared to the songs' studio versions.

Eilish announced that she would embark on a world tour in support of Happier Than Ever, through a video released on her YouTube channel, on May 21. The tickets were made available for sale one week later. The tour consisted of 72 concerts across North America, Europe, and Oceania. It began on February 3, 2022, in New Orleans, United States. Parts of the tour were held at festivals such as Coachella Valley Music and Arts Festival and Glastonbury Festival.

Before her show on September 30, 2022, at Perth Arena, Western Australia, Eilish worked with Apple Music to exclusively host a film of one of the concerts, specifically one of her shows at the O2 Arena in London. She billed the film as a way for fans who missed out on tickets to experience the tour for themselves, wanting more people to recognize her for her showmanship live. Two concerts, titled Happier Than Ever, The Hometown Encore, were held at the Kia Forum in Inglewood, California from December 15 to 16, 2022. The tour concluded on April 2, 2023, in Guadalajara, Mexico.

=== Singles ===
Seven singles were released in support of Happier Than Ever, with the first six managing to chart within top 40 on the Billboard Hot 100 in the United States. The album's lead single, "My Future", was released on July 30, 2020, one year before the album's scheduled release date. An accompanying animated music video was published the same day as the song and was directed by Australian animator Andrew Onorato. The single was critically acclaimed, even appearing at some publication's year-end lists as one of the best songs of the year. It debuted at number six on the Billboard Hot 100, becoming her third top ten entry. Besides not receiving radio treatment in the United States, "My Future" is the only single of the album that appeared on physical discs. The second single, "Therefore I Am", was released on November 12, 2020, with an accompanying music video directed by Eilish herself. The song met with a positive critical reception and, commercially, became the biggest single of Happier Than Ever. The single debuted at number 94 on the Billboard Hot 100, rising to number two the following week, making it the fourth-greatest leap in the Hot 100's history with a vault of 92 positions. The track was promoted through the 2020 American Music Awards live performance.

"Your Power" arrived on April 29, 2021, as the album's third single with an accompanying music video. Well received by music critics, it was next single promoting the project that landed within the top ten of the US Billboard Hot 100. It was promoted by a performance on The Late Show with Stephen Colbert, and became the second single after "Therefore I Am" that impacted American radios. On June 2, "Lost Cause" was released as the fourth single. The accompanying music video sparked discourse on social media, that ultimately culminated into an apology posted on the singers Instagram story, as Eilish was accused of queerbaiting. The track would ultimately peak only at number 27, before a brief 4-week chart run on the Hot 100, becoming her worst performing single released to radio to date on the chart. The fifth single, "NDA", was released on July 9, along with another self-directed visual. Despite the song receiving an official studio performance video and radio release in the United States, the single barely scratched Hot 100's top 40, debuted and peaked at number 39, lasting a mere five weeks on the chart. Additionally, the single was not received as warmly by music critics as previous efforts, with Rolling Stone India calling it one of the worst songs of 2021.

The final two songs of Happier Than Ever, namely the title track and "Male Fantasy", were chosen as the album's sixth and seventh singles, respectively. Similarly to how the music video for "Bad Guy" was published on the same day as When We All Fall Asleep, Where Do We Go? (2019), the music video for "Happier Than Ever" was uploaded to Eilish's YouTube account on the same day as the release of its parent album, on July 30, 2021. The song was met with widespread critical acclaim, topping Harper's Bazaar's best songs of 2021 list. Eilish performed the single on numerous occasions, such as on The Tonight Show Starring Jimmy Fallon and Jimmy Kimmel Live!. The track reached top ten in 17 countries, including the United Kingdom where it peaked at number 4, becoming her sixth UK top five single. However, in the United States, "Happier Than Ever" missed the top ten, debuting on the Hot 100 at number 11. On December 6, Eilish debuted the video for "Male Fantasy", with the song being issued as the seventh single. Even though critically acclaimed, the song did not manage to appear on many charts. Both "Male Fantasy" and "Happier Than Ever" were performed by Eilish on Saturday Night Live on December 11.

== Critical reception ==
Professional ratings
Aggregate scores
| Source | Rating |
|---|---|
| AnyDecentMusic? | 8.2/10 |
| Metacritic | 86/100 |
Review scores
| Source | Rating |
| AllMusic | 4.5/5 stars |
| And It Don't Stop | A |
| DIY | 5/5 stars |
| Entertainment Weekly | B+ |
| The Guardian | 4/5 stars |
| The Independent | 4/5 stars |
| The Line of Best Fit | 6/10 |
| NME | 5/5 stars |
| Pitchfork | 7.6/10 |
| Rolling Stone | 4/5 stars |

Upon release, Happier Than Ever received critical acclaim from music critics, who admired its resolute portrayal of teenage stardom contrasting its muted sound. At Metacritic, which assigns a normalized rating out of 100 to reviews from publications, the album has a weighted mean score of 86 based on 27 reviews, indicating "universal acclaim".

NME critic El Hunt lauded the album for proving Eilish "one of her generation's most significant pop artists", and wrote that its music is "softer" and "far more low-key" than her debut record. Alexis Petridis of The Guardian noted the "uniformly great" melodies and vocals, the "less flashy" production in Happier Than Ever, observing a "more somber" tone. Sal Cinquemani of Slant felt the album is more "sonically diverse" than Eilish's debut record, expanding beyond its predecessor's trip-hop and trap elements. The Daily Telegraph's Neil McCormick dubbed Happier Than Ever "the sound of a tortured teen alone in her bedroom late at night", its lyrics "pithy", and Eilish's vocals "delicate".

Reviewing in his "Consumer Guide" column, Robert Christgau gave Happier Than Ever an "A" and applauded Eilish for conceiving original ideas about fame through "sheer candor", highlighting her lyrics on "Getting Older", "Not My Responsibility", and "Everybody Dies". Louis Bruton of The Irish Times stated the album describes "the confinements and exploitations of being a celebrity and a teenager." Rob Sheffield, writing for Rolling Stone, called it a "downright heroic", "dark, painful, confessional album where [Eilish is] choosing not to settle into the role of America's beloved kooky kid sister." David Smyth of Evening Standard complimented the style and non-mainstream appeal of the album's production. Clash's Robin Murray called Happier Than Ever "a work of subtle evolution" and "a record of quiet complexity".

Variety's Chris Willman highlighted the album's "trenchant observation", "self-aware humor", and "post-celebrity self-consciousness". Sarah Carson of i labeled the album a "great, understated, philosophical" project inclining towards sparse and acoustic pop music trends. Jesse Atkinson of Gigwise called the album's production extraordinary, admiring its interpretation of music genres. Giselle Au-Nhien Nguyen of The Sydney Morning Herald deemed the album a cohesive, "revealing and rewarding, listening experience" enhanced by Eilish's "acidic" delivery. In his Slate review, Carl Wilson liked the musical and lyrical maturity Eilish displays in Happier Than Ever. The New York Times's Lindsay Zoladz felt the album is "fixated on the tension between private and public knowledge, a social-media-era pop star's meditation on how much candor—if any—she owes her audience."

A few reviews were critical of Happier Than Ever. Alexandra Pollard of The Independent remarked that the album is "full of things most of us don't have to deal with", but Eilish turns them into relatable stories via "insightful" songs. She dismissed the tracks "Oxytocin" and "Goldwing" as insubstantial. In a mixed review, Matthew Kent of The Line of Best Fit commended Eilish's lyrics and Finneas's production, but regarded the album a less unique work, with its tracks "often blurring into each other." Consequence critic Mary Siroky, despite her overall warm review, also agreed that the album could be too cohesive with sonically indistinct songs. The A.V. Club's Alex McLevy felt "there are just a few too many tracks on Happier Than Ever, which starts off unstoppably strong, but starts to falter in the back half." Stereogum's Tom Breihan wrote negatively, calling the album a boring, "shell-shocked" product of Eilish's attempts at making a second album as triumphant as her first.

=== Year-end lists ===
Happier Than Ever on year-end lists
| Publication | List | Rank | Ref. |
|---|---|---|---|
| BBC | The 21 Best Albums of 2021 | 14 | |
| Billboard | The 50 Best Albums of 2021 | 8 | |
| Consequence | Top 50 Albums of 2021 | 26 | |
| The Guardian | The 50 Best Albums of 2021 | 24 | |
| NME | The 50 Best Albums of 2021 | 15 | |
| NRC Handelsblad | Hester Carvalho's best music of 2021 | 1 | |
| PopMatters | The 75 Best Albums of 2021 | 45 | |
| Rolling Stone | The 50 Best Albums of 2021 | 15 | |
| Slant Magazine | The 50 Best Albums of 2021 | 6 | |
| The Telegraph | The 10 Best Albums of 2021 | 9 | |
| Variety | The Best Albums of 2021 | 3 | |

=== Decade-end lists ===
| Publication | Accolade | Rank | Ref. |
|---|---|---|---|
| Rolling Stone | The 250 Greatest Albums of the 21st Century So Far | 155 | |

== Commercial performance ==
A few weeks before its release, with over 1.028 million pre-adds of Happier Than Ever, Eilish reclaimed the Apple Music record for the most pre-saved album ever in the platform's history; Canadian singer the Weeknd had previously seized the record from Eilish's own When We All Fall Asleep, Where Do We Go? (2019) with his album After Hours (2020). (Note: On October 29, 2021, The fourth studio album by Adele, 30, surpassed Happier Than Ever and broke the record.) The International Federation of the Phonographic Industry reported that Eilish was the third best-selling female artist of 2021, behind Taylor Swift and Adele.

=== United States ===
Happier Than Ever marked Eilish's second number-one album in the United States. It debuted atop the Billboard 200 with 238,000 album-equivalent units, the fifth largest week for an album in 2021. Of the 238,000 units, sales constitutes 154,000 copies, which is the third largest album sales week in 2021, and 84,000 units calculated from the 113.87 million on-demand streams the album received in its first week. The tally also consists of 73,000 vinyl LPs shipped in the same week.

The album topped the Billboard 200 for its first three consecutive weeks, becoming the first album by a woman to do so since Swift's Folklore (2020), and the second album in 2021 to achieve the feat, after Dangerous: The Double Album by American singer Morgan Wallen. Nine songs from the album charted on the all-genre Billboard Hot 100 simultaneously, whereas all of its tracks charted on the Hot Rock & Alternative Songs chart, with the title track, "Happier Than Ever", debuting at number one.

=== Other markets ===
In the United Kingdom, the album debuted at number one on the UK Albums Chart with 39,000 units, scoring Eilish's second number-one album in the country. With over 9,500 vinyl record sales, Happier Than Ever became the third-fastest selling vinyl album of the millennium by a female artist in the UK. The album debuted atop Germany's Offizielle Top 100 as Eilish's first number one album there. It eclipsed her debut album, which peaked at number three.

In Australia, the album landed atop the ARIA Albums Chart, her second number one in the country, whilst five songs debuted on the ARIA Singles Chart; all of the album's five singles charted on the chart previously. Happier Than Ever entered at the number one spot of France's SNEP albums chart with 14,695 units, becoming her first French number-one album.

== Accolades ==
List of awards and nominations received by Happier Than Ever
| Year | Award | Category | Result | Ref. |
|---|---|---|---|---|
| 2021 | People's Choice Awards | Album of the Year | Nominated | |
| 2022 | Grammy Awards | Album of the Year | Nominated | |
| 2022 | Grammy Awards | Best Pop Vocal Album | Nominated | |
| 2022 | iHeartRadio Music Awards | Alternative Album of the Year | Won | |
| 2022 | Nickelodeon Kids' Choice Awards | Favorite Album | Won | |
| 2022 | Premios Odeón | Best International Album | Nominated | |
| 2022 | MTV Video Music Awards | Album of the Year | Nominated | |

== Track listing ==
All tracks are written by Billie Eilish O'Connell and Finneas O'Connell. All tracks are produced by Finneas.

Happier Than Ever track listing
| No. | Title | Length |
|---|---|---|
| 1. | "Getting Older" | 4:04 |
| 2. | "I Didn't Change My Number" | 2:38 |
| 3. | "Billie Bossa Nova" | 3:16 |
| 4. | "My Future" | 3:30 |
| 5. | "Oxytocin" | 3:30 |
| 6. | "Goldwing" | 2:31 |
| 7. | "Lost Cause" | 3:32 |
| 8. | "Halley's Comet" | 3:54 |
| 9. | "Not My Responsibility" | 3:47 |
| 10. | "Overheated" | 3:34 |
| 11. | "Everybody Dies" | 3:26 |
| 12. | "Your Power" | 4:05 |
| 13. | "NDA" | 3:15 |
| 14. | "Therefore I Am" | 2:53 |
| 15. | "Happier Than Ever" | 4:58 |
| 16. | "Male Fantasy" | 3:14 |
| Total length: | | 56:07 |

Tour edition
| No. | Title | Length |
|---|---|---|
| 17. | "My Future" (live performance from the DNC) |
| 18. | "Therefore I Am" (live from iHeartRadio ALTer Ego 2021) |
| 19. | "Your Power" (Vevo live performance) |
| 20. | "Lost Cause" (Vevo live performance) |

Japan tour edition
| No. | Title | Length |
|---|---|---|
| 17. | "NDA" (Japan special performance) |
| 18. | "Billie Bossa Nova" (Japan special performance) |

Japan tour edition – DVD bonus
| No. | Title | Length |
|---|---|---|
| 1. | "Interview for Japan" |
| 2. | "Happier Than Ever" (music video) |
| 3. | "Happier Than Ever" (Making of the Video) |
| 4. | "Male Fantasy" (music video) |
| 5. | "NDA" (music video) |
| 6. | "Lost Cause" (music video) |
| 7. | "Your Power" (music video) |
| 8. | "Happier Than Ever, The World Tour (Road to Opening Night)" |
| 9. | "NDA" (Japan special performance) |
| 10. | "Billie Bossa Nova" (Japan special performance) |

=== Notes ===
- "Goldwing" interpolates "Hymn to Vena" from Choral Hymns from the Rig Veda, Third Group (1910), a group of compositions by Gustav Holst based on hymns from the Rigveda.

== Personnel ==
- Billie Eilish – vocals, vocal engineering, songwriting
- Finneas – production, engineering, vocal arranging (all tracks); bass (1–5, 8–11, 15), drum programming (1–15), piano (1, 3, 8), synthesizer (1–5, 7–13, 15, 16), background vocals (2, 7), electric guitar (3, 4, 8, 15), programming (4, 15), synth bass (4, 6, 7, 12, 13), Wurlitzer electric piano (4, 16), percussion (5, 6, 12, 13, 15), acoustic guitar (7, 12, 16), Mellotron, Rhodes (11); nylon-string guitar (15)
- Dave Kutch – mastering (1–3, 5–16)
- John Greenham – mastering (4)
- Mourad Lagsir – mastering (16)
- Rob Kinelski – mixing

== Charts ==
=== Weekly charts ===
Chart performance for Happier Than Ever
| Chart (2021–2022) | Peak position |
|---|---|
| Argentine Albums (CAPIF) | 2 |
| Australian Albums (ARIA) | 1 |
| Austrian Albums (Ö3 Austria) | 1 |
| Belgian Albums (Ultratop Flanders) | 1 |
| Belgian Albums (Ultratop Wallonia) | 1 |
| Canadian Albums (Billboard) | 1 |
| Croatian International Albums (HDU) | 1 |
| Czech Albums (ČNS IFPI) | 2 |
| Danish Albums (Hitlisten) | 1 |
| Dutch Albums (Album Top 100) | 1 |
| Finnish Albums (Suomen virallinen lista) | 1 |
| French Albums (SNEP) | 1 |
| German Albums (Offizielle Top 100) | 1 |
| Greek Albums (IFPI) | 1 |
| Hungarian Albums (MAHASZ) | 11 |
| Irish Albums (Official Charts) | 1 |
| Italian Albums (FIMI) | 1 |
| Japan Hot Albums (Billboard Japan) | 15 |
| Japanese Albums (Oricon) | 17 |
| Lithuanian Albums (AGATA) | 1 |
| New Zealand Albums (RMNZ) | 1 |
| Norwegian Albums (VG-lista) | 1 |
| Polish Albums (ZPAV) | 1 |
| Portuguese Albums (AFP) | 1 |
| Scottish Albums (Official Charts) | 1 |
| Slovak Albums (ČNS IFPI) | 2 |
| Spanish Albums (Promusicae) | 1 |
| Swedish Albums (Sverigetopplistan) | 1 |
| Swiss Albums (Schweizer Hitparade) | 1 |
| UK Albums (Official Charts) | 1 |
| Uruguayan Albums (CUD) | 2 |
| US Billboard 200 | 1 |
| US Top Alternative Albums (Billboard) | 1 |
| US Top Rock & Alternative Albums (Billboard) | 6 |

=== Year-end charts ===
2021 year-end chart performances for Happier Than Ever
| Chart (2021) | Position |
|---|---|
| Australian Albums (ARIA) | 17 |
| Austrian Albums (Ö3 Austria) | 7 |
| Belgian Albums (Ultratop Flanders) | 7 |
| Belgian Albums (Ultratop Wallonia) | 28 |
| Canadian Albums (Billboard) | 34 |
| Danish Albums (Hitlisten) | 18 |
| Dutch Albums (Album Top 100) | 12 |
| French Albums (SNEP) | 51 |
| German Albums (Offizielle Top 100) | 19 |
| Icelandic Albums (Tónlistinn) | 19 |
| Irish Albums (IRMA) | 22 |
| Italian Albums (FIMI) | 70 |
| New Zealand Albums (RMNZ) | 26 |
| Norwegian Albums (VG-lista) | 9 |
| Polish Albums (ZPAV) | 87 |
| Portuguese Albums (AFP) | 10 |
| Spanish Albums (PROMUSICAE) | 35 |
| Swedish Albums (Sverigetopplistan) | 45 |
| Swiss Albums (Schweizer Hitparade) | 8 |
| UK Albums (OCC) | 26 |
| US Billboard 200 | 41 |
| US Top Alternative Albums (Billboard) | 5 |

2022 year-end chart performances for Happier Than Ever
| Chart (2022) | Position |
|---|---|
| Australian Albums (ARIA) | 18 |
| Austrian Albums (Ö3 Austria) | 19 |
| Belgian Albums (Ultratop Flanders) | 20 |
| Belgian Albums (Ultratop Wallonia) | 58 |
| Canadian Albums (Billboard) | 23 |
| Danish Albums (Hitlisten) | 50 |
| Dutch Albums (Album Top 100) | 17 |
| French Albums (SNEP) | 98 |
| German Albums (Offizielle Top 100) | 53 |
| Icelandic Albums (Tónlistinn) | 27 |
| Lithuanian Albums (AGATA) | 24 |
| Norwegian Albums (VG-lista) | 22 |
| New Zealand Albums (RMNZ) | 16 |
| Portuguese Albums (AFP) | 63 |
| Spanish Albums (PROMUSICAE) | 65 |
| Swedish Albums (Sverigetopplistan) | 82 |
| Swiss Albums (Schweizer Hitparade) | 32 |
| UK Albums (OCC) | 38 |
| US Billboard 200 | 23 |

2023 year-end chart performances for Happier Than Ever
| Chart (2023) | Position |
|---|---|
| Australian Albums (ARIA) | 51 |
| Belgian Albums (Ultratop Flanders) | 21 |
| Belgian Albums (Ultratop Wallonia) | 94 |
| Dutch Albums (Album Top 100) | 41 |
| French Albums (SNEP) | 119 |
| Hungarian Albums (MAHASZ) | 73 |
| New Zealand Albums (RMNZ) | 46 |
| Portuguese Albums (AFP) | 77 |
| Spanish Albums (PROMUSICAE) | 100 |
| UK Albums (OCC) | 97 |
| US Billboard 200 | 90 |
| US Top Alternative Albums (Billboard) | 7 |

2024 year-end chart performance of Happier Than Ever
| Chart (2024) | Position |
|---|---|
| Australian Albums (ARIA) | 71 |
| Belgian Albums (Ultratop Flanders) | 19 |
| Belgian Albums (Ultratop Wallonia) | 80 |
| Dutch Albums (Album Top 100) | 37 |
| French Albums (SNEP) | 193 |
| Hungarian Albums (MAHASZ) | 86 |
| Portuguese Albums (AFP) | 26 |
| Swiss Albums (Schweizer Hitparade) | 81 |
| UK Albums (OCC) | 96 |
| US Billboard 200 | 131 |
| US Top Alternative Albums (Billboard) | 14 |

2025 year-end chart performance of Happier Than Ever
| Chart (2025) | Position |
|---|---|
| Australian Albums (ARIA) | 52 |
| Austrian Albums (Ö3 Austria) | 33 |
| Belgian Albums (Ultratop Flanders) | 15 |
| Belgian Albums (Ultratop Wallonia) | 67 |
| Danish Albums (Hitlisten) | 100 |
| Dutch Albums (Album Top 100) | 24 |
| Hungarian Albums (MAHASZ) | 89 |
| Polish Albums (ZPAV) | 63 |
| Swedish Albums (Sverigetopplistan) | 97 |
| Swiss Albums (Schweizer Hitparade) | 62 |
| UK Albums (OCC) | 76 |
| US Billboard 200 | 130 |
| US Top Alternative Albums (Billboard) | 15 |

== Certifications and sales ==
Certifications and sales
| Region | Certification | Certified units/sales |
|---|---|---|
| Australia (ARIA) | 2× Platinum | 140,000^{‡} |
| Austria (IFPI Austria) | 2× Platinum | 30,000^{‡} |
| Belgium (BRMA) | 2× Platinum | 40,000^{‡} |
| Canada (Music Canada) | 4× Platinum | 320,000^{‡} |
| Denmark (IFPI Danmark) | 3× Platinum | 60,000^{‡} |
| France (SNEP) | 2× Platinum | 200,000^{‡} |
| Germany (BVMI) | Gold | 100,000^{‡} |
| Hungary (MAHASZ) | Platinum | 4,000^{‡} |
| Iceland (FHF) | — | 1,749 |
| Italy (FIMI) | Platinum | 50,000^{‡} |
| Mexico (AMPROFON) | Platinum+Gold | 210,000^{‡} |
| New Zealand (RMNZ) | 3× Platinum | 45,000^{‡} |
| Poland (ZPAV) | 3× Platinum | 60,000^{‡} |
| Portugal (AFP) | Platinum | 7,000^{‡} |
| Spain (Promusicae) | Gold | 20,000^{‡} |
| United Kingdom (BPI) | Platinum | 300,000^{‡} |
| United States | — | 3,900,000 |
^{‡} Sales+streaming figures based on certification alone.

== Release history ==
Release dates and formats for Happier Than Ever
| Region | Date | Format | Edition | Label | Ref. |
|---|---|---|---|---|---|
| Various | July 30, 2021 | Cassette; CD; digital download; streaming; vinyl; box set | Standard | Darkroom; Interscope | |
| Brazil | September 17, 2021 | CD | Standard | Universal Brasil | |
| Japan | August 24, 2022 | CD + DVD | Japan Tour Edition | Interscope; Universal Japan | |

== See also ==
- List of 2021 albums (July–December)
- List of albums which have spent the most weeks on the UK Albums Chart
- List of Billboard 200 number-one albums of 2021
- List of number-one albums from the 2020s (New Zealand)
- List of number-one albums of 2021 (Australia)
- List of number-one albums of 2021 (Belgium)
- List of number-one albums of 2021 (Canada)
- List of number-one albums of 2021 (Ireland)
- List of number-one albums of 2021 (Portugal)
- List of number-one albums of 2021 (Spain)
- List of number-one hits of 2021 (Italy)
- List of UK Albums Chart number ones of the 2020s
