= Therefore I Am (song) =

2020 single by Billie Eilish

Single by Billie Eilish

from the album Happier Than Ever
- Released: November 12, 2020
- Recorded: 2020
- Genre: Dark pop; electropop; hip-pop; R&B
- Length: 2:54
- Label: Darkroom; Interscope
- Songwriters: Billie Eilish; Finneas O'Connell
- Producer: Finneas O'Connell

Billie Eilish singles chronology
"My Future" (2020)	"Therefore I Am" (2020)	"Lo Vas a Olvidar" (2021)

Music video
- "Therefore I Am" on YouTube

"Therefore I Am" is a song by American singer-songwriter Billie Eilish and the second single from her second studio album, Happier Than Ever (2021). It was released on November 12, 2020, through Darkroom and Interscope Records. It is an uptempo dark pop, electropop, hip-pop, and R&B track. Eilish wrote the song with its producer, Finneas O'Connell.

The song received positive reviews from music critics, with many of them comparing it to Eilish's hit single "Bad Guy". "Therefore I Am" was featured in 2020 year-end lists by multiple publications, including Billboard, NME, and Uproxx. The song peaked at number two on the US Billboard Hot 100, behind 24kGoldn’s “Mood” featuring Iann Dior, giving Eilish her fourth top-10 hit in the United States. The song further reached the top five on the Billboard airplay Hot Rock & Alternative Songs charts and number one on the Mainstream Top 40 chart. It peaked at number one on the singles charts in Greece, Ireland, Lithuania, and New Zealand, alongside receiving a platinum certification in Canada from Music Canada (MC).

Released on the same day as its single, the song's music video was filmed inside the Glendale Galleria shopping mall in Glendale, California. Due to the COVID-19 pandemic, the mall had been closed to the public, hence the absence of people in the mall throughout the music video. Self-directed by Eilish, the music video features her alone in an empty shopping mall, stealing and eating various consumables from food stalls in the mall. Eilish performed the song at American Music Awards of 2020 in November 2020 and as part of a concert film and a world tour in support of Happier Than Ever.

== Background and development ==
Development for "Therefore I Am" began in January 2020, and continued throughout quarantine during the COVID-19 pandemic. On September 14, 2020, during an Instagram Live session, Eilish revealed she would release a new song and music video. On November 9, 2020, Eilish announced on social media that "Therefore I Am" would be released on November 12, 2020, while simultaneously revealing the cover art. In an interview with Zane Lowe on Apple Music 1, Eilish explained: "You know this song is very, very up for interpretation. I'm very curious to see what people get from it and also what they feel when they hear it. It was very fun to complete. It was fun to record. I feel like you can hear it. I feel that I sound very much like…I'm just fucking around. I'm just joking. It's like, come on. It's so real. I feel like a natural, and don't take me seriously, you know? I love it."

== Composition and lyrics ==
"Therefore I Am"
A sample of the second verse and chorus of "Therefore I Am", featuring a "disaffected vocal performance" and a "swaggering beat."

Musically, "Therefore I Am" is an uptempo pop, dark pop, electropop, hip-pop, and R&B track, that has hip-hop influences. The song is played in the key of D minor with Eilish's vocals spanning a range of E_{3} to F_{4}. Both the title and corresponding line are a reference to the cogito, a philosophical statement coined by René Descartes. Music critics have commented that the song features instrumentation consisting of a bassline, kick drum, "disaffected vocal performance" and a "swaggering beat". Moreover, the track uses a synthesizer throughout the hook and has braggadocios rapped verses in between each hook.

Lyrically, Eilish sings about disregarding people's opinions towards her. She explains that she is an individual with a mind of her own and does not require anybody making decisions on her behalf. In the chorus, Eilish makes fun of an unknown person, telling them that they believe they are "the man" while beginning to wonder the reality of existence. As the song continues, Eilish does not feel the person is what they believe themselves to be. In the first verse, Eilish expresses disdain towards the constant media coverage about her and demands the charlatans to stop speaking her name as if they know her personally. Laura English of Music Feeds theorized that she is singing about "articles about her baggy getups to paparazzi shots when she wears normal clothes". In the bridge, Eilish laughs as she claims she does not know who the person is, repeating: "I'm sorry, I don't think I caught your name".

== Critical reception ==
"Therefore I Am" was met with positive reviews from music critics. Glenn Rowley of Billboard mentions that the song has Eilish's "signature throbbing beats" and "whispery vocals". In a five-star review, Thomas Smith of NME noted that Eilish "fuses critical philosophy with a swipe at the haters on her thrilling new single, a deliciously spicy tale that will no doubt have fans decoding every line". Rachael Dowd of Alternative Press commented that the song "shows another side to [Eilish] some may have never seen before". Good Morning America's Josh Johnson described the song as a sequel to Eilish's number one hit "Bad Guy".

Mike Wass of Idolator viewed the song as a "defiant banger" and said it was "easily her catchiest and most commercial song since "Bad Guy". Steffanee Wang of Nylon cited that the song is a "dark-sounding bange" and "sheds the self-seriousness of her last few releases and lets loose". Slant Magazine's Alexa Camp analyzed that the song is a "stark contrast" compared to her two previously released singles, "No Time to Die" and "My Future". Jordan Robledo of the Gay Times lauded the songs "eerie" sound, "hypnotizing" vocals, and its "unapologetic" lyrics. He thought the song was a "bop from start to finish". In his review for The New York Times, Jon Pareles said "Therefore I Am" was a "relatively minor addition to [Eilish's] catalog" but mentioned it "has attitude enough to get by". The song featured on 2020 year-end lists by Billboard (14), Consequence of Sound (24), NME (14), and Uproxx (50).

== Accolades ==
Awards and nominations for "Therefore I Am"
Year	Organization	Award	Result	Ref(s)
2021	MTV Video Music Awards	Best Pop	Nominated	
2021	MTV Video Music Awards	Best Cinematography	Nominated	
2021	International Pop Poll Awards	Top Ten International Gold Songs	Nominated	
2022	ASCAP Pop Music Awards	Winning Song	Won	

== Release and commercial performance ==
"Therefore I Am" was released digitally on Thursday, November 12, 2020. It was serviced to Australian and Italian radio stations the next day. It was serviced to the US alternative contemporary and contemporary hit radios on November 17. It was released to the US adult contemporary radio stations on December 7.

"Therefore I Am" debuted at number 94 on the US Billboard Hot 100 with 3.1 million streams, 5,000 downloads, and 11.7 million radio airplay audience impressions in its first four days of tracking. The song rose to number two on the chart the next week after it drew 24.2 million streams, 14,000 downloads, and 18.3 million radio airplay audience impressions, giving Eilish her fourth top-10 hit in the United States and 20th total Hot 100 hit. With a vault of 92 positions, "Therefore I Am" made the fourth-greatest leap in the Hot 100's history. The song also peaked within the top five on the US Billboard airplay Hot Rock & Alternative Songs chart, and topped the Mainstream Top 40 chart, her second number one on the latter chart. It reached number two in Canada and received a platinum certification by Music Canada (MC) for track-equivalent sales of 80,000 units.

The song also reached number two on the UK Singles Chart and received a silver certification from the British Phonographic Industry (BPI), which denotes track-equivalent sales of 200,000 units. "Therefore I Am" peaked at number one on the singles charts in Greece, Ireland, Lithuania, and New Zealand. It further reached the top five in Australia, Austria, Denmark, Finland, Germany, Hungary, Israel, Portugal, Singapore, Sweden, and Switzerland. The song also peaked within the top 20 in the Czech Republic, Italy, Malaysia, the Netherlands, and both the Belgium Flanders and Wallonia charts.

== Music video ==
=== Background ===
A music video for "Therefore I Am" premiered on Eilish's YouTube channel on November 12, 2020. The video was solely directed by Eilish. It was shot inside the Glendale Galleria shopping mall in California, where she would frequently go when she was a young teenager. Eilish told Lowe about the visual: "The video is just the way that the song feels to me—careless and not really trying. The video, we, number one, shot on an iPhone, which we didn't even mean to do". She described the video as both "random" and "chaotic", and revealed that it was filmed overnight with "barely any crew". Fans believe Eilish made the music video in order to prove that she does not care what people think about her body.

=== Synopsis and reception ===
A still from a music video, depicting Eilish's favorite moment of the visual.

The video begins with Eilish, dressed in both a baggy white cardigan that has graffitied symbols and patches, and a pair of shorts, walking around an empty shopping mall alone. As the song's beat kicks in, Eilish begins to dance wildly throughout the mall. The singer helps herself to food and drinks from Wetzel's Pretzels, Hot Dog on a Stick, and Chipotle Mexican Grill. Thereafter, Eilish ascends an escalator, and sings the chorus while eating the food acquired in the video. The video concludes with an off-screen security guard yelling at Eilish, instructing her to leave the building; the singer flees from the mall into a parking garage.

Writing for The Fader, Jordan Darville compared the visual to Fatboy Slim's "Weapon of Choice" music video (2001), but said it had "less dancing and more french fries". Patrick Hosken of MTV noted the video captures a feeling of "estrangement" and "isolation". He mentioned that Eilish was not "implicitly haunted by the shuttered shops and eerie emptiness", while adding the video evokes "Dawn of the Dead's suburban post-apocalyptica" and plays like a "nuclear-fallout version of New Radicals's beloved late-'90s kids-take-over-the-mall anthem, 'You Get What You Give'". Liam Hess, writing for Vogue magazine, stated the video offered a "mall rat-inspired twist on a signature Eilish silhouette—and marked a welcome return for one of pop's most agenda-setting style stars". The staff of Paper magazine noted the production has a "lo-fi handheld camera quality", and hypothesized that Eilish and her crew spent their budget on renting out the mall.

== Live performances ==
To further promote "Therefore I Am", Eilish performed the song for first time at the American Music Awards of 2020 on November 22. She included it in the Disney+ concert film Happier Than Ever: A Love Letter to Los Angeles, released on September 3, 2021. Eilish also performed "Therefore I Am" it in the set list of a world tour (2022–2023) in support of Happier Than Ever.

== Credits and personnel ==
Credits adapted from Tidal.

- Billie Eilish – vocals, songwriter
- Finneas – producer, songwriter, recording engineer
- Rob Kinelski – mixer
- Dave Kutch – mastering engineer
- Mourad Lagsir – mastering engineer

== Charts ==
=== Weekly charts ===
Weekly chart performance for "Therefore I Am"
Chart (2020–2021)	Peak position
Australia (ARIA)	3
Austria (Ö3 Austria Top 40)	2
Belgium (Ultratop 50 Flanders)	10
Belgium (Ultratop 50 Wallonia)	14
Canada Hot 100 (Billboard)	2
Canada CHR/Top 40 (Billboard)	8
Canada Hot AC (Billboard)	18
Canada Rock (Billboard)	36
CIS Airplay (TopHit)	24
Colombia (National-Report)	75
Czech Republic Airplay (ČNS IFPI)	10
Czech Republic Singles Digital (ČNS IFPI)	3
Denmark (Tracklisten)	3
Finland (Suomen virallinen lista)	2
France (SNEP)	34
Germany (GfK)	5
Greece International (IFPI)	1
Global 200 (Billboard)	2
Hungary (Single Top 40)	2
Hungary (Stream Top 40)	1
Iceland (Tónlistinn)	2
Ireland (IRMA)	1
Israel (Media Forest)	3
Italy (FIMI)	15
Japan Hot 100 (Billboard)	75
Lebanon (Lebanese Top 20)	1
Lithuania (AGATA)	1
Malaysia (RIM)	6
Mexico (Billboard Mexican Airplay)	8
Netherlands (Dutch Top 40)	19
Netherlands (Single Top 100)	11
New Zealand (Recorded Music NZ)	1
Norway (VG-lista)	2
Poland Airplay (ZPAV)	36
Portugal (AFP)	5
Romania (Airplay 100)	88
Russia Airplay (TopHit)	17
San Marino (SMRRTV Top 50)	31
Scottish Singles Sales (Official Charts)	53
Singapore (RIAS)	2
Slovakia Airplay (ČNS IFPI)	40
Slovakia Singles Digital (ČNS IFPI)	1
Spain (PROMUSICAE)	41
Sweden (Sverigetopplistan)	4
Switzerland (Schweizer Hitparade)	2
UK Singles (Official Charts)	2
US Billboard Hot 100	2
US Adult Contemporary (Billboard)	18
US Adult Pop Airplay (Billboard)	5
US Hot Rock & Alternative Songs (Billboard)	2
US Pop Airplay (Billboard)	1
US Rock & Alternative Airplay (Billboard)	2
US Rolling Stone Top 100	1

=== Year-end charts ===
2020 year-end chart performance for "Therefore I Am"
Chart (2020)	Position
Hungary (Single Top 40)	81
Hungary (Stream Top 40)	65

2021 year-end chart performance for "Therefore I Am"
Chart (2021)	Position
Australia (ARIA)	74
Belgium (Ultratop Flanders)	90
Canada (Canadian Hot 100)	24
CIS (TopHit)	163
Global 200 (Billboard)	56
Hungary (Stream Top 40)	88
Portugal (AFP)	113
Russia Airplay (TopHit)	158
US Billboard Hot 100	25
US Adult Top 40 (Billboard)	17
US Hot Rock & Alternative Songs (Billboard)	5
US Mainstream Top 40 (Billboard)	10
US Rock Airplay (Billboard)	10

== Certifications ==
Certifications and sales for "Therefore I Am"
Region	Certification	Certified units/sales
Australia (ARIA)	3× Platinum	210,000^{‡}
Austria (IFPI Austria)	Platinum	30,000^{‡}
Belgium (BRMA)	Gold	20,000^{‡}
Brazil (Pro-Música Brasil)	Diamond	160,000^{‡}
Canada (Music Canada)	5× Platinum	400,000^{‡}
Denmark (IFPI Danmark)	Platinum	90,000^{‡}
France (SNEP)	Platinum	200,000^{‡}
Germany (BVMI)	Gold	200,000^{‡}
Italy (FIMI)	Platinum	70,000^{‡}
Mexico (AMPROFON)	4× Platinum	560,000^{‡}
New Zealand (RMNZ)	2× Platinum	60,000^{‡}
Poland (ZPAV)	2× Platinum	100,000^{‡}
Portugal (AFP)	Platinum	10,000^{‡}
Spain (Promusicae)	Gold	30,000^{‡}
United Kingdom (BPI)	Platinum	600,000^{‡}
Streaming
Greece (IFPI Greece)	Gold	1,000,000^{†}
Sweden (GLF)	Gold	6,000,000^{†}
^{‡} Sales+streaming figures based on certification alone.^{†} Streaming-only figures based on certification alone.

== Release history ==
Release dates and formats for "Therefore I Am"
Region	Date	Format(s)	Label(s)	Ref.
Various	November 12, 2020	Digital download; streaming	Darkroom; Interscope	
Italy	November 13, 2020	Radio airplay	Universal	
United States	November 17, 2020	Alternative radio; contemporary hit radio; hot adult contemporary radio	Darkroom; Interscope	
United States	December 7, 2020	Adult contemporary radio; modern adult contemporary radio	Darkroom; Interscope	

== See also ==
- List of number-one singles of 2020 (Ireland)
- List of number-one singles from the 2020s (New Zealand)
- List of Billboard Hot 100 top-ten singles in 2020
- List of UK top-ten singles in 2020
- List of top 10 singles for 2020 in Australia
