= My Future =

2020 single by Billie Eilish

Single by Billie Eilish

from the album Happier Than Ever
- Written: April 1–3, 2020
- Released: July 30, 2020
- Recorded: 2020
- Genre: Jazz pop
- Length: 3:28
- Label: Darkroom; Interscope
- Songwriters: Billie Eilish; Finneas O'Connell
- Producer: Finneas O'Connell

Billie Eilish singles chronology
"Ilomilo" (2020)	"My Future" (2020)	"Therefore I Am" (2020)

Music video
- "My Future" on YouTube

"My Future" is a song by American singer-songwriter Billie Eilish, released as the lead single from her second studio album, Happier Than Ever (2021). It was released on her brother Finneas O'Connell's birthday, July 30, 2020, through Darkroom and Interscope Records, exactly a year before the album's release. A downtempo jazz pop ballad with influences of ambient, bossa nova, funk, R&B, and soul, the song's lyrics address an ode to self-love and personal power. Eilish wrote the song alongside its producer, Finneas O'Connell.

The song received positive reviews from music critics, with praise directed towards its theme of self-empowerment. "My Future" was featured on 2020 year-end lists by multiple publications, including Billboard, USA Today, and Slate. The song peaked at number six on the US Billboard Hot 100, giving Eilish her third top-10 hit in the United States. It reached the top five in Australia, Malaysia, New Zealand, and Singapore.

An animated music video for "My Future" was directed by Andrew Onorato, and produced by Australian animation company Studio Chop. The visual was released on Eilish's official YouTube channel on July 30, 2020. In the video, Eilish walks away from a relationship while thinking about her future. The visual was praised by critics for its animation. Eilish performed the song at the 2020 Democratic National Convention and the 2020 iHeartRadio Jingle Ball.

== Background and release ==
On July 24, 2020, Eilish took to her Instagram page to post a picture of herself standing on a balcony with the skyline of Los Angeles in the background, wearing a black face mask and a grey jogging suit. The post featured the caption "'my future' out Thursday". On July 28, 2020, Eilish promoted the track by sharing the animated cover art, which depicts her sitting under a tree while looking at the Moon. On July 29, Eilish shared a 20-second audio clip of "My Future" on Instagram. "My Future" was inspired by Eilish being alone in quarantine during the COVID-19 pandemic. In an interview with Apple Music's Zane Lowe, Eilish stated: "We wrote the song in like two days, This is the most we've ever worked in one period of time. But we record, we wrote it like a month into quarantine probably. And it was pouring rain. [...] [I]t was such a perfect setting. And then we recorded the vocal in Finneas' studio, which is just in his basement in his house". Eilish added that "it was exactly where my head was at - hopeful, excited and a craaaazy amount of self-reflection and self-growth. But recently it has also taken on a lot of new meaning in the context of what's happening in the world now. I hope you can all find meaning in it for yourselves." "My Future" was written by Eilish alongside her brother Finneas O'Connell, while production was solely handled by the latter. The track was mastered by John Greenham and mixed by Rob Kinelski, both of whom served as studio personnel. It was released for digital download and streaming as the lead single from Eilish's second studio album, Happier Than Ever (2021) on July 30, 2020, via Darkroom and Interscope Records.

== Composition ==
"My Future"
"My Future"—a song about self-empowerment with electric piano, guitars, and drums—begins with a subdued melody and switches to an upbeat production with a summery rhythm.

Critical commentary described "My Future" as an uptempo or downtempo jazz pop ballad, with influences of ambient, bossa nova, funk-pop, jazz, R&B, and soul. The song features electric piano, guitars, and drums. Craig Jenkins of Vulture described its melody as reminiscent of soul blues songs and old Disney films' music. "My Future" has been compared to Eilish's cover of Bobby Hebb's "Sunny", as well as the works of Jorja Smith and Corinne Bailey Rae. It opens with a slow and melancholic melody, transitioning midway into an upbeat production with a percussive rhythm. Coco Romack of MTV News felt that the latter part of the song was summery.

Lyrically, "My Future" serves as an ode to self-love and personal power. Coco Romack of MTV wrote that it "claps back at the notion that one must be validated by outside affection". Chris Willman of Variety stated that the song was about "leaving a narcissistic significant other behind to concentrate on achieving goals on one's own". The song begins almost entirely a capella, as Eilish sings about walking away from a relationship to put herself first: "I've changed my plans/Cause I/I'm in love/With my future". "I'm in love with my future/Can't wait to meet her/I'm in love, but not with anybody else/Just want to get to know myself", Eilish sings through jazz-inspired vocals before a "funky" bassline appears. The song ends on voice and keyboards, with the line: "I'll see you in a couple years".

== Critical reception ==
Professional ratings
Review scores
Source	Rating
The Daily Telegraph	4/5 stars
NME	4/5 stars

Upon release, "My Future" was met with critical acclaim from music critics. William Hughes of The A.V. Club called it "sleepy" and "somnambulistic". Gary Dinges of USA Today commended the lyrical content, which he described has "raw lyrics" and "stellar vocals". Samantha Hissong and Brittany Spanos, writing for Rolling Stone, described "My Future" as Eilish's "most uplifting song to date". Romack praised the song as "dreamy". The staff of Teen Vogue commented that the song "shows continued growth in how Billie is looking at the world", while the staff of DIY called it "something of an understated feminist anthem". Jenkins depicted the track as "a reminder that even though the present looks scary, there are better times on the other side". Billboard's Jason Lipshutz dubbed the song as "personal" and added it "bursts into a ray of sunshine, with Eilish's voice blossoming in the warmth".

John R. Kennedy of iHeartRadio Canada labeled "My Future" as a "poignant" song. The song was praised by The New York Times' Jon Caramanica, who called it and "uncomplicated", and felt "Eilish's ease is the dominant mode — worrying about yourself first makes for no worry at all". Jessica Mckinney of Complex praised the song as one of Eilish's most "rare upbeat and sunny records". Writing for The Independent, Isobel Lewis regarded the song as a "haunting piano ballad" with "strong guitar and Eilish's signature electronic style". Reviewing for Slant Magazine, Alexa Camp cited the track as a "dreary but gorgeous dirge, with Eilish's soulful, layered vocals stacked on top of atmospheric keyboards". Mike Wass of Idolator praised the production of "My Future", which he described as "reflecting the positivity of the lyrics".

=== Accolades ===
"My Future" was placed at number 12 on Insider's Every Billie Eilish song, ranked list, with Callie Ahlgrim describing the song as "gorgeous", "poetic", and an "extremely timely ode to independence", further praising the production, saying it "remains appropriately gentle" and never "feels glib or over-the-top optimistic". She concluded saying Eilish's vocals "have truly never sounded better", and remarked them as "effortless" and "hypnotic" that are "noticeably more drawn-out, elaborate, and confident." The song featured on 2020 year-end lists by Billboard (33), Dazed (10), Stereogum (25), Slate (17), and USA Today (1).

== Commercial performance ==
"My Future" debuted at number six on the US Billboard Hot 100 chart dated August 15, 2020, becoming Eilish's third top-10 hit in the United States and her highest debut on the chart, surpassing "Bad Guy" (2019), which debuted at number seven. The track also topped the US Billboard Hot Rock & Alternative Songs chart, rising from number 18 to the summit during the issue dated August 15, 2020, becoming Eilish's first track to top the chart. It also peaked at number one on the Hot Alternative Songs chart. On the US Alternative Digital Song Sales chart, "My Future" became Eilish's fifth number one. At the time, she was tied with Twenty One Pilots for the second-most leaders in the chart's history, while Imagine Dragons lead the chart with six number ones. The track was streamed 20.9 million times and had 15,000 downloads in the US through July 31 and August 6, 2020. It drew more than 1.3 million streams and sold 3,000 in the week ending July 30. The song ranked up to 7.4 million downloads on radio during the week dated August 9, 2020.

Internationally, the song peaked at number nine on the Canadian Hot 100 and received a platinum certification by Music Canada (MC) for track-equivalent sales of 80,000 units in Canada. On the UK Singles Chart, the song reached number seven, becoming Eilish's fifth top-10 in the United Kingdom. "My Future" also peaked within the top five on the singles charts in Australia, Malaysia, New Zealand, and Singapore. It further reached the top-20 in the Czech Republic, Ireland, Denmark, Finland, the Netherlands, Norway, Portugal, Scotland, Slovakia, and Switzerland.

== Music video ==
=== Background and synopsis ===
Many journalists compared the music video's aesthetic to that of anime; some said it was reminiscent of Studio Ghibli films.

An animated music video for "My Future" was directed by Australian director Andrew Onorato, and released on Eilish's official YouTube channel the same day as the single. It was produced by Australian animation company Chop Studio. The video was animated by Alex Dray, Andrew Onorato, Annie Zhao, Cliona Noonan, Nancy Li, and Sarah Schmidt. The visual has been described as "anime in nature".

The visual tells a story of a young woman "coming into her own". In it, an animated Billie symbolizes a relationship she's walking away from. She wanders alone through a Studio Ghibli-inspired, psychedelic forest in the rain while contemplating about her future. When the second verse comes around, the sun comes out and the forest begins to bloom, as trees engulf Eilish and lift her up to the sky.

=== Critical reception ===
The animated video was positively received by critics upon release. Jackson Langford of NME called it a "gorgeous animated affair", while Ann Powers of NPR stated Eilish is a "fairy tale heroine" and that the video "dwells within the magic cultivated by an autonomous young woman who's ready to claim her future as it comes". Ronia Aniftos, writing for Billboard, commented that "[as] [the] sun comes out and the greenery begins to bloom exponentially, [so] [does] Eilish's career continues to do in real life". Kirsten Acuna of Insider viewed the visual as a "beautifully animated music video". Jessica Wang, writing for Bustle magazine, compared the visual to the works of Hayao Miyazaki, with movies such as: Spirited Away (2001), My Neighbor Totoro (1998), and Kiki's Delivery Service (1989). In a less enthusiastic review, Time Out magazine writer Emma Steen noted the video "lack[s] the finesse of a Ghibli anime", but said it is a "mesmerising visual".

== Live performances and other usage ==
Eilish performed the song for the first time on the third night of the 2020 Democratic National Convention. A few days later, she and Finneas played the song for NPR's "Tiny Desk (Home) Concert". Eilish performed the song at the iHeartRadio Jingle Ball in December 2020, with Finneas playing the piano and providing background vocals. In September 2020, American singer Miley Cyrus covered the song for BBC Radio 1's Live Lounge while surrounded by candles and a masked band.

== Credits and personnel ==
Credits adapted from Tidal.

- Billie Eilish – vocals, songwriter
- Finneas O'Connell – producer, songwriter, engineer, programming, drum programming, bass guitar, electric guitar, synth bass, synthesizer, Wurlitzer electric piano
- John Greenham – mastering engineer
- Rob Kinelski – mixer

== Charts ==
=== Weekly charts ===
Weekly chart performance for "My Future"
Chart (2020)	Peak position
Argentina Hot 100 (Billboard)	88
Australia (ARIA)	3
Austria (Ö3 Austria Top 40)	28
Belgium (Ultratop 50 Flanders)	25
Belgium (Ultratop 50 Wallonia)	31
Canada Hot 100 (Billboard)	9
Canada CHR/Top 40 (Billboard)	34
Czech Republic Singles Digital (ČNS IFPI)	19
Croatia (HRT)	52
Denmark (Tracklisten)	18
Finland (Suomen virallinen lista)	19
France (SNEP)	94
Germany (GfK)	47
Global 200 (Billboard)	62
Hungary (Single Top 40)	27
Hungary (Stream Top 40)	14
Iceland (Tónlistinn)	17
Ireland (IRMA)	8
Italy (FIMI)	60
Malaysia (RIM)	4
Mexico Ingles Airplay (Billboard)	21
Netherlands (Single Top 100)	30
New Zealand (Recorded Music NZ)	4
Norway (VG-lista)	12
Portugal (AFP)	18
Scottish Singles Sales (Official Charts)	14
Singapore (RIAS)	4
Slovakia Singles Digital (ČNS IFPI)	15
Spain (PROMUSICAE)	78
Switzerland (Schweizer Hitparade)	16
UK Singles (Official Charts)	7
US Billboard Hot 100	6
US Adult Pop Airplay (Billboard)	27
US Hot Rock & Alternative Songs (Billboard)	1
US Pop Airplay (Billboard)	25
US Rock & Alternative Airplay (Billboard)	18
US Rolling Stone Top 100	3

=== Year-end charts ===
Year-end chart performance for "My Future"
Chart (2020)	Position
US Hot Rock & Alternative Songs (Billboard)	12

== Certifications ==
Certifications and sales for "My Future"
Region	Certification	Certified units/sales
Australia (ARIA)	Platinum	70,000^{‡}
Austria (IFPI Austria)	Gold	15,000^{‡}
Brazil (Pro-Música Brasil)	3× Platinum	120,000^{‡}
Canada (Music Canada)	2× Platinum	160,000^{‡}
Denmark (IFPI Danmark)	Gold	45,000^{‡}
France (SNEP)	Gold	100,000^{‡}
Mexico (AMPROFON)	Platinum+Gold	90,000^{‡}
New Zealand (RMNZ)	Platinum	30,000^{‡}
Poland (ZPAV)	Gold	25,000^{‡}
Portugal (AFP)	Gold	5,000^{‡}
Spain (Promusicae)	Gold	30,000^{‡}
United Kingdom (BPI)	Gold	400,000^{‡}
^{‡} Sales+streaming figures based on certification alone.

== Release history ==
Release dates and formats for "My Future"
Region	Date	Format	Label	Ref.
Various	July 30, 2020	Digital download; streaming	Darkroom; Interscope	
United States	July 30, 2020	Alternative radio; contemporary hit radio	Darkroom; Interscope	
Various	September 18, 2020	7" picture disc	Darkroom; Interscope; Polydor	
