= Getting Older =

2021 song by Billie Eilish

Song by Billie Eilish

from the album Happier Than Ever
- Released: July 30, 2021
- Genre: Minimal
- Length: 4:04
- Label: Darkroom; Interscope
- Songwriters: Billie Eilish O'Connell; Finneas O'Connell
- Producer: Finneas

Lyric video
- "Getting Older" on YouTube

"Getting Older" is a song by American singer-songwriter Billie Eilish and the opening track of her second studio album, Happier Than Ever (2021). Featuring a minimalist production, the song is backed by pulsing synthesizers, a bass guitar, and a keyboard that plays staccato notes. Its lyrics discuss the positive and negative aspects of Eilish's transition into adulthood in the wake of her success that she first received as a teenager. Due to the subject matter, critics compared the song to Nirvana's "Serve the Servants", the opening track of their 1993 studio album In Utero. "Getting Older" contains references to sexual abuse and Eilish's childhood trauma, prompting her to take a break midway through the writing process.

Many music critics deemed the song a powerful opening track, and some applauded its relatability despite the difficulties of writing a song about fame that resonates with laypeople. They argued that this was achieved through references to universal, sympathetic experiences, such as feeling burdened by large amounts of expectations and horrified by the loss of one's childhood. Upon Happier Than Ever's release, "Getting Older" charted in 14 countries and reached the top 40 of five national charts. It peaked at number 69 on the US Billboard Hot 100 and number 35 on the Billboard Global 200. Eilish starred in a 2021 concert film and embarked on a 2022–2023 world tour in support of the album; the song was included in their respective set lists. American singer Adam Lambert made a glam rock rendition of the song for his fifth studio album High Drama (2023).

== Background ==
At 18 years old, Billie Eilish won five awards at the 62nd Annual Grammy Awards held in 2020. Three of them were awarded to her debut studio album When We All Fall Asleep, Where Do We Go? (2019). A commercial success, it debuted atop record charts in various countries and brought her mainstream fame. Her newly found success attracted the attention of stalkers: in 2019, the address of her family home in Los Angeles leaked online, causing three fans to show up at her house one day. One of them was an old man who had driven all the way from San Diego. That same year, a man was arrested for trespassing after appearing outside Eilish's residence seven times while "showing erratic behavior", such as by waiting for her by the front porch when told by her father that she was not home yet. A judge issued a restraining order against the man, which prevented him from trying to contact or go within a 100-meter radius of Eilish and her parents, harassing the family, or visiting Eilish's workplaces. In 2020, her family experienced stalking from another man, so on February 11, 2021, Eilish filed a Civil Harassment Restraining Order against him. The court ruled in her favor. Camping by a school across from Eilish's residence, the stalker had been sending her death threats via letters and making throat-slitting gestures whenever they encountered each other. Eilish started fearing for her life and the well-being of her family, and she stopped feeling safe while inside her house as well as travelling outside of it. In a court statement, she commented: "Every time I see him I just want to scream."

In early 2020, Eilish announced she would begin work on her second studio album that year; in a cover story for Rolling Stone, she said that "almost none of the songs on this album are joyful". The album's lyrical themes include disillusionment with fame and the struggles that young women face in the entertainment industry, such as sexual and emotional abuse. In April 2021, Eilish announced its title was Happier Than Ever, revealing its track list and release date. Set for release three months later, the album contains "Getting Older" as its opening track.

A single from the album—"Your Power"—was released on April 29, 2021. The song is a plea for people to avoid abusing their authority, and it explores the topics of domestic abuse and sexual harassment. After its release, Eilish gave an interview for the British edition of Vogue. She talked about how her life had greatly changed since she was a child, as well as her negative experiences with fame. To contextualize the themes behind "Your Power", Eilish stated that she was sexually abused years ago: "I used to not understand why age mattered. And, of course, you feel like that when you're young, because [...] you feel like you're so mature and you know everything [...] People forget that you can grow up and realize shit was fucked up when you were younger."

Eilish reflected on writing "Getting Older" during other interviews that talked about the album's themes. She wanted the song to have confessional lyrics heavily inspired by her personal life, and although she was eager to take this approach, she also felt anxious. Midway through writing, she felt the urge to cry and had to take a break from the process. Eilish hesitated to disclose the full context behind "Getting Older"; even though she wanted her fans to learn more about her personal life, she was also uncomfortable with sharing too much sensitive background information. The event that prompted her to write the song, Eilish explained, happened to her when she was a child. It was traumatic and mortifying to a degree that she had never shared the specifics with anyone before: "I don't want to tell anyone, let alone the entire internet [...] It's why a lot of women and men — but especially women — don't tell anyone when they're going through it." She then referenced #MeToo, a social movement started by women to expose and counter sexual misconduct by abusive figures of authority.

== Music and lyrics analysis ==
"Getting Older" is four minutes and four seconds long, with a minimalist production that Vulture's Craig Jenkins described as "both plush and delicate and barely there". It is backed by pulsing synthesizers, a bass guitar, and a keyboard that plays staccato notes, as Eilish performs in a vibrato singing style. Background vocals occasionally appear throughout the song. The lyrics explore the positive and negative aspects of Eilish's transition into adulthood in the wake of her success that she first received as a teenager. Due to the subject matter, three music journalists compared "Getting Older" to Nirvana's "Serve the Servants", the opening track of their 1993 studio album In Utero.

Eilish opens the song by reflecting: "I'm getting older, I think I'm aging well / I wish someone had told me I'd be doing this by myself." In the next lines, she talks about parts of her life that she associates with her newly acquired fame, including the amount of voyeuristic fans who stalk her from her house's front door. Eilish points out that they are strangers to her and calls them out for being "deranged". Alex McLevy of The A.V. Club interpreted one line—"It's different when a stranger's always waiting at your door"—as not only a negative effect of high public attention, but also a metaphor for the challenges of creating art with authentic, honest intent when "everything you do is scrutinized with a cultural magnifying glass". Eilish explores how the burnout from fame has removed the fun and passion out of pursuing her hobbies: "Things I once enjoyed / Just keep me employed now." Critics compared these sentiments of ennui to lyrics from "Serve the Servants", specifically the opening lines "Teenage angst has paid off well / Now I'm bored and old."

"Getting Older" makes allusions to sexual harassment and the demand for consent as a way to hold abusers accountable. Eilish reflects on being compelled to perform unspecified activities against her will and how that abuse played a role in forming her childhood trauma. To expound on her feelings of distress, she observes how whenever she retells a story, she exaggerates every possible negative detail, with the intent of seeking pity and attention from others. Eilish fails to receive any attention using this approach, harshly admonishing herself for it. In the final verses, she reassures people concerned about her well-being that she will get better. Through the lines "Wasn't my decision to be abused" and "Was too afraid to tell ya [about it], but now, I think it's time", she asserts her willingness to confront and recover from her traumatic experiences.

To further discuss the positive aspects of her life as a public figure, Eilish expresses her gratitude for the various ways by which her success has benefited her. She recognizes her increased sense of accountability for her mistakes: "I'm getting better at admitting when I'm wrong." The Observer's Kitty Empire drew parallels between this lyric and a controversy in which Eilish was criticized for lip-syncing offensive lyrics to a song by Tyler, the Creator, for which she profusely apologized. (Note: The song in question, "Fish" (2011), contains the word "chink", an anti-Chinese and anti-Asian slur.) Eilish describes herself as "happier than ever", referencing the album's title, and announces her intentions to "keep [herself] together and prioritize [her] pleasure".

== Release and reception ==
After Happier Than Ever's release on July 30, 2021, "Getting Older" entered the US Billboard Hot 100 record chart alongside five other songs from the album. It debuted at number 69, the second highest entry out of the six songs after the title track (11). (Note: The other album tracks were "Billie Bossa Nova" (70), "Oxytocin" (72), "I Didn't Change My Number" (80), and "Halley's Comet" (90).) "Getting Older" peaked within the top 40 of national record charts in five countries: Ireland (23), the UK (28), New Zealand (32), Australia (35), and Switzerland (39). It peaked at number 35 on the Billboard Global 200, which ranks songs based on digital downloads and streams from over 200 territories around the world.

Several music critics deemed "Getting Older" a powerful opening track and thought that its lyrics effectively set the tone for the rest of the album. (Note: Music journalists that commented on "Getting Older" in this way include: Billboard's Hannah Dailey; The A.V. Club's Alex McLevy; Rolling Stone's Rob Sheffield; USA Today's Charles Trepany; and Consequence's Mary Siroky.) Many praised the song for its honesty; its mature, introspective point of view; as well as its emotional impact—a reviewer appreciated the juxtaposition between Eilish's "beautiful" vocals and the "morbid" nature of the lyrical themes. Two critics labeled it one of Happier Than Ever's top 5 best songs. (Note: Specifically, Billboard's Hannah Dailey and USA Today's Charles Trepany.) When asked about their favorite lyrics from the album, several staff writers for The Ringer quoted lines from "Getting Older". Charles Holmes justified this by pointing to how its lyrics "bounce from emotionally brutal to darkly wry and back again".

Similarly, McLevy lauded the "cutting" nature of its lines about stalkers: "The song flips the entire script of the usual 'you, the fans, keep me grounded' approach, turning from a rumination to a reprimand." He called it a clever way to open Happier Than Ever, or what he called her "first post-fame album." Some critics commented on the difficulties of writing about the pressures of fame without engendering a sense of alienation from listeners, and they thought Eilish impressively overcame this problem with "Getting Older". In their view, she was able to achieve relatability by referencing experiences with which most people can sympathize, such as feeling burdened by large amounts of expectations and horrified by the loss of one's childhood. Ranking "Getting Older" as Eilish's 27th best song in 2021, Jackson Langford of MTV Australia wrote: "Following an album that muses about what lurks in the dark [...] Billie Eilish still has the ability to haunt, but it's no longer with fantastical stories – it's with her own, singular experiences."

== Live performances and other usage ==
"Getting Older" was included in the set lists of a 2021 concert film and a 2022–2023 world tour in support of Happier Than Ever. As Eilish performed it during the tour, home videos that showcased events from her childhood, such as singing with Finneas, blowing birthday candles, and hugging her family, were played on a large stage screen. She held more live renditions of the song at 2021 shows for Time ABC and BBC Live Lounge. In 2022, Eilish headlined the annual Glastonbury music festival in the UK, including "Getting Older" in her set list. She sang it with Damon Albarn, lead guitarist for English virtual band Gorillaz, during Coachella, another music festival she headlined that year. While performing, she tripped and fell face first onto the stage, joking that she "ate shit [and] ass" and explaining that she fell because the stage was dimly lit. To commemorate Happier Than Ever's one-year anniversary, Eilish and Finneas visited the Amoeba Music record store in Hollywood to perform it alongside three of her other songs.

On August 11, 2021, Eilish in partnership with Apple released a short film showcasing Apple Music's spatial audio feature; the singer sang "Getting Older" a cappella in front of a vanity mirror, before transitioning into "Goldwing". In American Express-curated "Story of My Song" video regarding "Birds of a Feather" off Eilish's next studio album Hit Me Hard and Soft (2024), Finneas unveiled that he put a heavily manipulated snippet of "Getting Older" in the background of the song.

== Credits and personnel ==
Credits adapted from Tidal.

- Billie Eilish O'Connell – vocals, songwriting, vocal engineering
- Finneas O'Connell – production, songwriting, engineering, vocal arranging, bass, drum programming, piano, synthesizer
- Dave Kutch – mastering
- Rob Kinelski – mixing
- Casey Cuayo – assistant mixing
- Eli Heisler – assistant mixing

== Charts ==
=== Weekly charts ===
Weekly chart performance for "Getting Older"
Chart (2021)	Peak position
Australia (ARIA)	35
Austria (Ö3 Austria Top 40)	43
Canada Hot 100 (Billboard)	41
Czech Republic Singles Digital (ČNS IFPI)	85
France (SNEP)	110
Global 200 (Billboard)	35
Greece International (IFPI)	68
Ireland (IRMA)	23
Lithuania (AGATA)	41
Netherlands (Single Top 100)	60
New Zealand (Recorded Music NZ)	32
Portugal (AFP)	42
Slovakia (Singles Digitál Top 100)	61
Sweden (Sverigetopplistan)	64
Switzerland (Schweizer Hitparade)	39
UK Singles (Official Charts)	28
US Billboard Hot 100	69
US Hot Rock & Alternative Songs (Billboard)	10

=== Year-end charts ===
Year-end chart performance for "Getting Older"
Chart (2021)	Position
US Hot Rock & Alternative Songs (Billboard)	82

== Certifications ==
Certifications for "Getting Older"
Region	Certification	Certified units/sales
Australia (ARIA)	Platinum	70,000^{‡}
Brazil (Pro-Música Brasil)	Platinum	40,000^{‡}
Canada (Music Canada)	Platinum	80,000^{‡}
New Zealand (RMNZ)	Gold	15,000^{‡}
United Kingdom (BPI)	Silver	200,000^{‡}
^{‡} Sales+streaming figures based on certification alone.

== Adam Lambert cover ==
"Getting Older"

Single by Adam Lambert

from the album High Drama
- Released: January 27, 2023
- Genre: Glam rock
- Length: 4:25
- Label: BMG
- Songwriters: Billie Eilish; Finneas O'Connell
- Producers: Jeremy Hatcher; Tommy English

Adam Lambert singles chronology
"Holding Out for a Hero" (2022)	"Getting Older" (2023)	"You Make Me Feel (Mighty Real)" (2023)

Music video
- "Getting Older" on YouTube

In December 2022, American singer Adam Lambert announced his fifth studio album High Drama (2023), set as a collection of covers. He posted its track listing unveiling that "Getting Older" is one of the tracks he chose to record. Lambert decided to make his rendition, since he was amused by such "subtle" and "profound" song, explaining to NME: "I was listening to the lyrics and I was like: 'How did this 19-year-old land on this feeling that I feel at 40 and that I'm sure that some people feel at 30?' It's a universal feeling, the idea of getting older; all the things she talks about in the song are timeless. You can be any age and feel that way."

Lambert's cover was produced by Tommy English and Jeremy Hatcher who provided the track's instrumentation, alongside Elias Mallin on drums. It was dubbed as a glam rock rendition of the original. As reported by Billboard's Stephen Dew, it stays "largely faithful" to Eilish's version, with an additional drums and guitar "for a little extra glam kick", however during the bridge Lambert "goes all-out with his stratospheric voice". Hannah Mylrea of NME pointed out that it has the charasteristics of 1970s pop music and guitar work reminiscent of British rock band Queen. Emma Harrison of Clash called Lambert's performance "emotional". The Line of Best Fit's René Cobar praised the singer's ability of enhancing listening experience of such recently released composition through a tempo change.

High Drama rendition of "Getting Older" was released as the third single from the album on January 27, 2023. On February 23, he published a music video directed by Heather Gildroy on his YouTube channel. It depicts him watching his old home clips, later transforming into an elderly version. Chrissy Callahan of Today noted that Lambert's sense of humor is visible in the visual, exemplified by a scene when he checks his pulse. The transformation into the old man of Lambert through make-up and prosthetics was praised by music critics and fans, as reported by Evening Standard's Tina Campbell who called it "jaw-dropping". In an interview for People, the singer expressed that he has "always wanted to do a complete transformation with makeup". He admitted that the procedure for the music video took four hours, but the results left him satisfied.

=== Formats and track listing ===
Digital download / streaming

1. "Getting Older" – 4:25

Spotify streaming

1. "Getting Older" – 4:25
2. "Holding Out for a Hero" – 3:50
3. "Ordinary World" – 3:20
4. "Mad About the Boy" – 2:50

=== Credits and personnel ===
Credits adapted from Tidal.

- Adam Lambert – vocals, executive production
- Billie Eilish O'Connell – songwriting
- Finneas O'Connell – songwriting
- Jeremy Hatcher – production, engineering, bass, guitar, keyboards
- Tommy English – production, guitar, keyboards
- Elias Mallin – drums
- Michael Nolasco – recording engineering, tracking engineering
- Dan Grech-Marguerat – mixing
- Jeremy Cooper – mastering
