= Domestic Abuse Restraining Order =

Type of restraining order used in Wisconsin

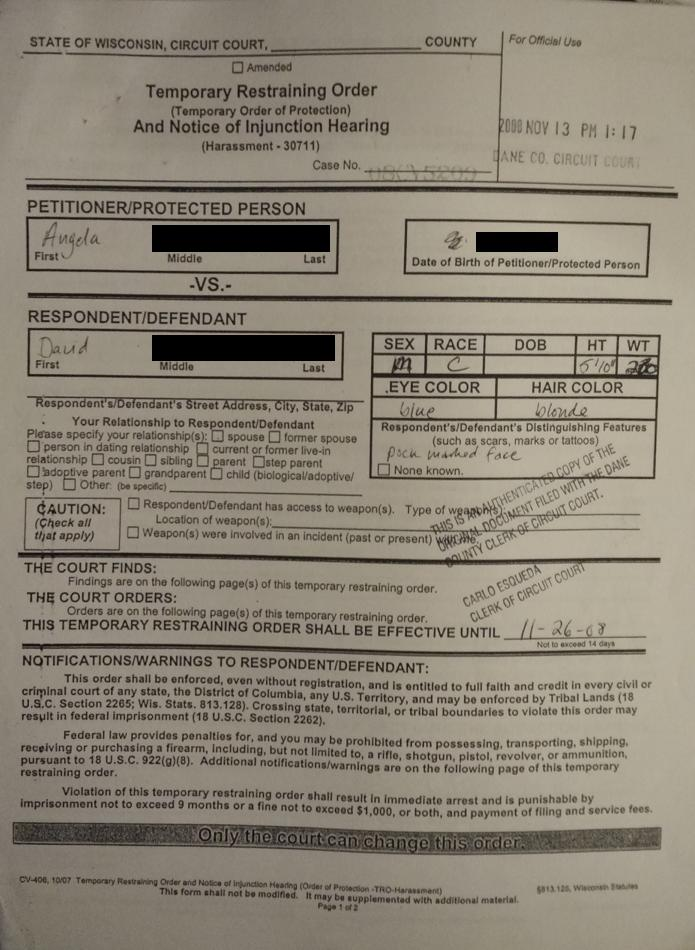
Restraining order successfully petitioned by a woman named Angela against her abuser under Wisconsin's domestic abuse laws

A Domestic Abuse Restraining Order (DARO) is a form of restraining order or order of protection used under the domestic abuse laws of the state of Wisconsin, USA, and enforceable throughout the US under invocation of the Full Faith and Credit Clause in the Violence Against Women Act (18 U.S.C. § 2265). It is a legal intervention in which one person (the respondent) who is deemed to be hurting, threatening or stalking another person (the petitioner) is ordered to stop — and often cease all direct and indirect contact — with the goal of reducing risk of further threat or harm to the petitioner. The petitioner and respondent will generally be in certain specific relationships such as a spousal or sexual relationship. If the petitioner is in an unwanted stalking relationship with the respondent, however, a closely related form of injunction, a Harassment Restraining Order (HRO) may be more appropriate.

Pursuant to Wis. Stat. § 813.12, domestic abuse for the purposes of obtaining either type of restraining order is defined to include intentional infliction of physical pain, physical injury or illness; intentional impairment of physical condition; sexual intercourse under Wis. Stat. § 940.225; sexual contact under Wis. Stat. § 940.225; stalking under Wis. Stat. § 940.32; damage to property under Wis. Stat. § 943.01; or a threat to do any of the above. A petitioner whose has experienced domestic abuse, under this definition, can file for either type of order for free. Pursuant to Wis. Stat. § 813.125, other forms of harassment for the purposes of obtaining a harassment restraining order include striking, shoving, kicking, or other physical abuse; or repeated intimidating acts. Petitioning for a harassment restraining order that does not qualify as domestic abuse requires the payment of a fee.

== Provisions and process ==
In Wisconsin there are similar processes for obtaining a domestic violence or harassment restraining order. The first step is ordinarily for the woman — the Wisconsin Coalition Against Domestic Violence generally refers to petitioners as female as most are women — to file an initial petition with the court. It is free of charge to file a petition for a domestic abuse restraining order. The harassment restraining order sometimes requires a fee but this is waived if the abuse also qualifies as domestic abuse, which it often does. The matter is considered a civil, not a criminal, case and the petitioner has no automatic right to an attorney, although she can retain an attorney if she can afford one. The woman often begins the process under extreme stress and overwhelmed with emotion. She must provide a detailed written statement of the facts supporting the granting of the order. She may request that a temporary restraining order be granted for a period of up to 14 days. The temporary restraining order may be granted ex parte without the abuser having the opportunity to appear in court. Unlike in some states, in Wisconsin an ex parte order can be granted on the basis of past abuse, with no further evidence of the likelihood of future abuse being needed.

The woman will also request that a full hearing — at which the abuser will be present - be held to determine whether to grant a permanent restraining order. Wisconsin courts will have jurisdiction to hear the case if the petitioner resides in Wisconsin—even if the respondent does not also reside in Wisconsin. The overall process does not usually last more than three to four weeks.

The temporary restraining order does not go into effect until it is served to the person being restrained. Serving the restraining order is the responsibility of the petitioner. Service can be carried out by the Sheriff's Department of the county where the harasser lives or works, or by any adult who is not a party named in the case. Judges are assigned to restraining order hearings on a rotating basis, with each judge handling restraining order hearings for one week every few months. At the full hearing, petitioners are seated on one side of the courtroom, and respondents on the other side. The hearing usually lasts about 15–30 minutes. At the hearing, both parties will have an opportunity to testify and present evidence, and the judge will make a decision. The permanent restraining order, if granted, may be in effect for up to four years, and the judge must, if granting it, grant it for as long as the petitioner requests up to four years. The order may also be granted, or extended, up to ten years if there is a substantial risk that the respondent may commit homicide or sexual assault against the petitioner. Respondents are supposed to be held by the bailiff for 15 minutes after the hearing ends to allow petitioners to leave safely, but this rule is not always followed.

An HRO or DARO can require the harasser to stop harassing the victim, and/or avoid the victim's residence or temporary place of accommodation. Like a DARO, subsequent to 17 April 2014, an HRO may also require that the harasser avoid all contact with the victim. The respondent is required to leave any location such as a restaurant or grocery store should he encounter the petitioner there. Such orders appear in online searches and can have an effect on employment and housing options for the respondent. Because these orders carry significant restrictions for the respondent, courts can be reluctant to issue the longer ten year orders.

== GPS monitoring for respondents ==
Wisconsin considered requiring GPS monitoring for all persons subject to a harassment or domestic abuse restraining order. In fiscal years 2014 and 2015, a pilot program was proposed to provide funds for testing such a program in some counties before it was to be implemented statewide. The governor proposed a budget of up to $2 million a year for the program. Once implemented, the program would have made Wisconsin the only state in the country to order GPS monitoring for those who are under, but who have not violated, a restraining order. The program has not yet been implemented by the Wisconsin Department of Justice (DOJ), however. The DOJ claims that current law does not permit judges to order GPS tracking for those who have not violated a restraining order. The governor's office pledged to tweak the language in a future budget so the program can go ahead. For offenders who violate a restraining order, as opposed to merely being subject to such an order, GPS monitoring is authorized by law.

== Punishment for violation ==
Law enforcement must make an arrest if they have probable cause to believe that the abuser has violated a HRO or DARO. Upon conviction, the penalty is a fine of up to $10,000 and/or a prison term of up to 9 months. Violators may be subject to global positioning system tracking based upon a risk assessment by the department of corrections. The victim may be referred to a domestic violence or sexual assault victim service provider. An exclusion zone will be created which the violator is not permitted to enter under GPS tracking.

== NCIC registration and firearms restrictions ==
The HRO or DARO will generally be registered in the Protection Order File of the National Crime Information Center. At the state level, a domestic abuse restraining order will automatically trigger a restriction on owning or possessing firearms. For a harassment restraining order, such restrictions are at the discretion of the judge granting the order and are not automatic.

Federal restrictions on firearms may also apply. The NCIC entry will include a "Brady indicator" indicating whether the restrained person is prohibited from owning firearms under federal law, with a "Y" indicating yes (the restrictions do apply), "N" for no, and "U" for unknown. Generally the Brady indicator will be set to "Y" only if certain relationships exist between the parties, such as a sexual/romantic relationship or a parent/child relationship. If the restraining order does not specify the relationship, an attempt is made to determine the relationship from other available data before setting it to "U". The federal Brady indicator restrictions, which are automatic if, and only if, certain conditions apply are distinct from possible state restrictions on HRO or DARO respondents possessing firearms. For an HRO, a state restriction on the respondent possessing firearms will depend on whether the judge, at his or her discretion, feels the respondent is a risk to use a firearm to harm others, but it is not automatic.

Once the court orders that the respondent is not permitted to possess firearms, the respondent must list all firearms currently in their possession. If the respondent does have possession of any firearms, the court will order they be surrendered--generally to the county sheriff. A follow up hearing is then held two weeks later to determine if the respondent has complied.

== Types of Restraining Orders in Wisconsin ==
The domestic abuse and harassment restraining orders are among the several types of restraining orders used in Wisconsin. The DARO is similar to the HRO but requires that certain specific relationships exist or did exist between the parties. The child abuse restraining order is also similar but is used where the victim of the abuse is a minor. Unlike the HRO, both the domestic abuse and child abuse restraining orders carry an automatic requirement not to possess firearms under state law. The individual at risk restraining order is a restraining order designed to protect adults with significant impairment in their ability to care for themselves.

The petitioner will sometimes have a choice as to whether to file a domestic abuse or harassment restraining order. The differences between the two orders have grown less over the years. In the past the penalties were less for violating a harassment restraining order, and a full no contact order could not be issued in a harassment restraining order hearing. A petitioner whose request for a temporary restraining order was denied was formerly entitled to a later injunction hearing only for domestic abuse restraining orders. If the respondent and petitioner shared a residence, the respondent could, in the past, not be ordered to avoid that residence under a harassment restraining order. These differences have been significantly reduced. Harassment and domestic abuse restraining orders now have the same penalties for violation, and a full no contact order can now be made in either case. The respondent can now be ordered to avoid the petitioner's residence in either case. A full hearing will now be granted in either case even if the temporary order is denied provided that, in the case of a harassment restraining order, the harassment also meets the definition of domestic abuse. The significant difference between the two types of orders that remains is the fact that the domestic abuse order carries an automatic firearms ban, while the harassment order does not. Sometimes petitioners who are eligible for both will opt for the harassment order because they do not want to force the respondents to give up their firearms. This can carry significant risks for petitioners, as guns are the most common cause of domestic abuse homicides in Wisconsin. Between 2000 and 2010, there were 213 domestic abuse murders in Wisconsin by guns, more than the 194 murders by knives, other weapons, or other means combined. As such, a petitioner stipulating to a harassment restraining order rather than a domestic abuse order must be questioned to the judge as to whether she entered into the stipulation voluntarily and understands the differences between the two types of orders. The petitioner must be fully informed of the consequences of opting for a harassment restraining order.

Out of state orders, including from any state, the District of Columbia, Puerto Rico, the United States Virgin Islands, a tribal court, or a province or territory of Canada, may be enforced in Wisconsin with similar penalties for violation as if the out of state order was actually a Wisconsin domestic abuse restraining order.

== Petitioner success rates ==
A 2006 Wisconsin study showed that female petitioners were successful about 62 percent of the time in seeking restraining orders at the full hearing where the respondents had the chance to be present. The success rate appeared to be higher if the petitioners were represented by advocates or attorneys. The success rate is about 83 percent with an attorney and 32 percent without an attorney. In 2017 in Dane County, 393 petitions for a domestic abuse restraining order were filed, resulting in 186 long term injunctions being issued, for an overall petitioner success rate of about 47 percent.

== Support for petitioners ==
The University of Wisconsin Law School operates a clinic, the Restraining Order and Survivor Advocacy Clinic, to support petitioners for domestic abuse restraining orders in Dane, Jefferson, Rock, and Sauk Counties. The program is named after the Victim of Crimes Act. Under the program, second and third year law students provide support to petitioners, including writing petitions, appearing with them in court, and providing direct and cross examination services. The program is intended to improve success rates for petitioners as well as teach both legal skills and empathy to law students. Students will make a commitment to be involved with the program for a semester. During that time it is expected that they will represent two or three petitioners. The short time frame for restraining order hearings will allow students to see complete cases through to completion. The program is operated in partnership with domestic abuse agencies such as Domestic Abuse Intervention Services.

The director of the clinic is Ryan Poe-Gavlinski. During the first year that the program was in effect, students helped 62 petitioners for restraining orders. The assistance was offered to varying degrees: some were represented in court while others were advised only by phone. In circumstances where the petitioner could not be represented in court, a trial prep meeting or call was arranged to help the petitioner prepare. Secondary trauma can be a concern for students and attorneys participating in the clinic and stress reduction techniques such as meditation are taught. Poe-Gavlinski has advocated that the time period for respondents to surrender firearms be reduced from two weeks to 48 hours, noting that the longer time frame makes it too risky that the respondent may attack the petitioner in that time period.

Another program in Milwaukee County brings together the Sojourner Family Peace Center and the Marquette University Law School to provide support for petitioners through pro bono legal representation. A 2019 study of this program found that those with legal representation were more than twice as likely to have their restraining order approved, and were also more likely to appear in court to face their abuser. This program, known as VALT--Volunteer Attorney Legal Team--involves law students interviewing petitioners applying for a domestic abuse restraining order. Students assist domestic abuse survivors in filing their petitions and support them in seeking safety.

== Effectiveness ==
Experts disagree on whether restraining orders are effective in preventing further harassment. A 2010 analysis published in the Journal of the American Academy of Psychiatry and the Law reviewed 15 U.S. studies of restraining order effectiveness, and concluded that restraining orders "can serve a useful role in threat management". However, a 2002 analysis of 32 U.S. studies found that restraining orders are violated an average of 40 per cent of the time and are perceived as being "followed by worse events" almost 21 per cent of the time, and concluded that "evidence of [restraining orders'] relative efficacy is lacking" and that they may pose some degree of risk. A large America-wide telephone survey conducted in 1998 found that, of stalking victims who obtained a restraining order, more than 68 per cent reported it being violated by their stalker.

Threat management experts are often suspicious of restraining orders, believing they may escalate or enrage stalkers. In his 1997 book The Gift Of Fear, well-known American security specialist Gavin de Becker characterized restraining orders as "homework assignments police give to women to prove they're really committed to getting away from their pursuers" and said they "clearly serve police and prosecutors" but "they do not always serve victims". De Becker also observed that restraining orders are most effective when the emotional involvement is lowest, for example when used following a brief, unsatisfactory, dating relationship as opposed to with an ex-spouse. In the case of stalking, de Becker advised that restraining orders are most effective if the woman rejects once, and then obtains the restraining order immediately following any further unwanted contact. If she continues to allow contact for an extended period after an initial firm rejection, any eventual restraining order may be less effective.
