= Restraining order =

Legal order prohibiting certain entities from specified actions

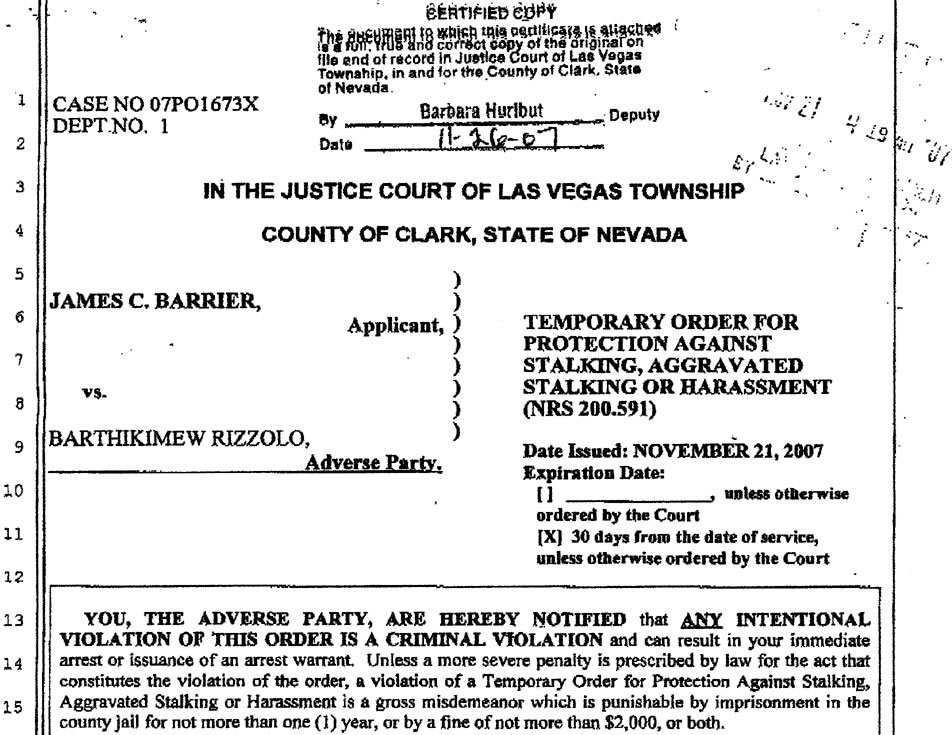
A restraining order issued by the Justice Court of Las Vegas

A restraining order or protective order (Note: There are other names such as "criminal orders of protection" and "criminal protective orders".) is an order used by a court to protect a person in a situation often involving alleged domestic violence, child abuse and neglect, assault, harassment, stalking, or sexual assault.

Restraining and personal protection order laws vary from one jurisdiction to another, but all establish who can file for an order, what protection or relief a person can get from such an order, and how the order will be enforced. The court will order the adverse party to refrain from certain actions or require compliance with certain provisions. Failure to comply is a violation of the order, which can result in the arrest and prosecution of the offender. Violations in some jurisdictions may also constitute criminal or civil contempt of court.

== Restraining order provisions ==
All protective order statutes permit the court to instruct an alleged abuser to stay a certain distance away from someone, such as their home, workplace or school ("stay away" provisions), and not to contact them. Alleged victims generally may also request the court to order that all contact, whether it be by telephone, notes, mail, fax, email, text, social media, or delivery of flowers, gifts, or drinks be prohibited ("no contact" provisions). Courts can also instruct an alleged abuser to not hurt or threaten someone ("cease abuse" provisions), known as no violent contact orders. The no-violent contact order statutes from the court may allow the alleged abuser to maintain their current living situation with the alleged victim or have contact with them.

Some states also allow the court to order the alleged abuser to pay temporary support or continue to make mortgage payments on a home owned by both people ("support" provisions), to award sole use of a home or car owned by both people ("exclusive use" provisions), or to pay for medical costs or property damage caused by the alleged abuser ("restitution" provisions). Some courts might also be able to instruct the alleged abuser to turn over any firearms and ammunition they have ("relinquish firearms" provisions), attend a batterers' treatment program, appear for regular drug tests, or start alcohol or drug abuse counselling. Its issuance is sometimes called a "de facto divorce".

== Burden of proof and misuse ==
The standard of proof required to obtain a restraining order can vary from jurisdiction to jurisdiction, but it is generally lower than the standard of beyond a reasonable doubt required in criminal trials. Many US states—such as Oregon and Pennsylvania—use a standard of preponderance of the evidence. Other states use different standards, such as Wisconsin, which require that restraining orders be based on "reasonable grounds".

Judges have some incentives to err on the side of granting restraining orders. If a judge grants a restraining order against someone who might not warrant it, typically the only repercussion is that the defendant might appeal the order. If, however, the judge denies a restraining order and the plaintiff is killed or injured, poor publicity and an enraged community reaction may harm the jurist's career.

Colorado's statute inverts the standard court procedures and due process, providing that after the court issues an ex parte order, the defendant must "appear before the court at a specific time and date and . . . show cause, if any, why said temporary civil protection order should not be made permanent". That is, Colorado courts place the burden of proof on the accused to establish their innocence, rather than requiring the accuser to prove their case. Hawaii similarly requires the defendant to prove their own innocence.

The low burden of proof for restraining orders has led to some high-profile cases involving stalkers of celebrities obtaining restraining orders against their targets. For example, in 2005, a New Mexico judge issued a restraining order against New York City-based TV host David Letterman after a woman made claims of abuse and harassment, including allegations that Letterman had spoken to her via coded messages on his TV show. The judge later admitted that he granted the restraining order not on the merits of the case, but because the petitioner had completely filled out the required paperwork.

Some attorneys have criticized the use of restraining orders on the theory that parties to a divorce may file such orders to gain tactical advantages, rather than out of a legitimate fear of harm. Liz Mandarano, an attorney who specializes in family and matrimonial law, speculates that divorce attorneys are incentivized to push for restraining orders because such orders force all communications to go through the parties' lawyers and may prolong the legal struggle. Some attorneys offer to have restraining orders dropped in exchange for financial concessions in such proceedings.

== Effectiveness ==
Experts disagree on whether restraining orders are effective in preventing further harassment. A 2010 analysis published in the Journal of the American Academy of Psychiatry and the Law reviewed 15 U.S. studies of restraining order effectiveness, and concluded that restraining orders "can serve a useful role in threat management". However, a 2002 analysis of 32 U.S. studies found that restraining orders are violated an average of 40 percent of the time and are perceived as being "followed by worse events" almost 21 percent of the time, and concluded that "evidence of [restraining orders'] relative efficacy is lacking", and that they may pose some degree of risk. Other studies have found that restraining orders offer little or no assurance against future interpersonal violence. A large America-wide telephone survey conducted in 1998 found that, of stalking victims who obtained a restraining order, only 30% of these orders kept the stalker away.

Threat management experts are often suspicious of restraining orders, believing they may escalate or enrage stalkers. In his 1997 book The Gift of Fear, American security specialist Gavin de Becker characterized restraining orders as "homework assignments police give to women to prove they're really committed to getting away from their pursuers," and said they "clearly serve police and prosecutors," but "they do not always serve victims". The Independent Women's Forum decries them as "lulling women into a false sense of security," and in its Family Legal Guide, the American Bar Association warns "a court order might even add to the alleged offender's rage".

Castle Rock v. Gonzales, 545 U.S. 748 (2005), is a United States Supreme Court case in which the Court ruled, 7–2, that a town and its police department could not be sued under 42 U.S.C. § 1983 for failing to enforce a restraining order, which had led to the murder of a woman's three children by her estranged husband.

Both parties must be informed of the restraining order for it to go into effect. Law enforcement may have trouble serving the order, making the petition unproductive. A study in the United States found that some counties had 91 percent of restraining orders non-served. A temporary order of restraint ("ex parte" order) is in effect for two weeks before a court settles the terms of the order, but it is still not in effect until the alleged abuser is served.

== Gender of parties ==
Restraining orders most commonly protect a woman against a male alleged abuser. A California study found that 72% of restraining orders active in the state at the time protected a woman against an alleged male abuser. Research suggests that these gender differences may reflect who is more likely to experience domestic violence and how they describe that violence. For example, in an analysis of protection order petitions submitted to the courts, women described their abuse differently than men and were more likely to use words like "fear." Men were less likely to frame themselves as "victims" of domestic violence, and that may be why fewer men received orders.

== Jurisdictions ==
=== United Kingdom ===
==== England ====
In English law, a non-molestation order may be granted under Section 42 of the Family Law Act 1996. Non-molestation orders are a type of injunction used to protect an individual from intimidation or harassment. Breaching a non-molestation order is a criminal offence. Under the Domestic Violence Crime and Victims Act 2004, cohabiting same-sex couples are able to seek a non-molestation order. Non-molestation orders sought for protection from domestic violence qualify for legal aid regardless of the applicant's income.

=== United States ===
Federal law requires that all states give "full faith and credit" to every portion of a restraining order issued by any state provided that certain minimum due process requirements are met. Thus a state with very lax standards for issuing a restraining order may enter such a protective order, and every state and federal territory would be required to adhere to every provision. Federal law prohibits any person who is subject to a state protective order from possessing a firearm, provided that the protected party is an intimate partner, meaning a spouse or former spouse, or a person with whom the protected party has had a child. Violating a restraining order is a deportable offense.

Some states (e.g. Mississippi) may also call a restraining order a peace bond and are similar to ASBO laws in the UK. Minnesota law provides for an order for protection (OFP) and a harassment restraining order (HRO).

Many jurisdictions offer a simplified process for filing a civil complaint for unrepresented litigants. For example, in North Carolina, pro se litigants can file a 50B (also called a DVPO, for domestic violence protective order) complaint with the clerk of court.

==== Types ====
In the United States, every state has some form of domestic violence restraining order law, and many states also have specific restraining order laws for stalking and sexual assault. In the US, each state has its own restraining order laws, but they tend to be divided into five main types. Not every state will have every type of restraining order on the books.

A domestic violence restraining order generally protects only parties deemed to be in some form of "domestic" relationship which may, depending on the statute, include a family, household, intimate, or sexual relationship.

A sexual assault restraining order specifically protects a victim of sexual assault regardless of what relationship may or may not exist between petitioner and respondent. If the state has no sexual assault restraining order statute, the victim may still qualify for a domestic violence restraining order if the sexual assault occurred in the context of a domestic relationship or if the statute is written sufficiently broad. In such cases, sexual assault survivors can sometimes qualify for domestic violence restraining orders because any act of sexual intercourse between petitioner and respondent, even during rape, legally establishes the required sexually intimate relationship.

Harassment and stalking restraining orders also generally do not require any specific relationship to exist or not exist between the parties, but also may not be available in all states. These types of restraining orders also generally require at least two instances of, respectively, harassment or stalking to qualify.

In many cases, one statute may cover more than one type of restraining order. For example, what is called a harassment restraining order in Wisconsin also specifically includes cases of sexual assault and stalking.

In Alabama, Delaware, Maine and Pennsylvania, a domestic violence restraining order is referred to as a Protection from Abuse order, or "PFA".

In California, domestic violence restraining orders are issued under Family Code Section 6200, et. seq. The California courts have designed domestic violence restraining orders to be accessible to the public so as not to require a lawyer to obtain or defend against one.

Finally, an extreme risk restraining order is a form of US restraining order, currently used in 13 states. Other forms of restraining order will sometimes order firearms restrictions as a part of a larger injunction intended to protect a specific individual. However, with an extreme risk restraining order, the sole focus is on the firearms restrictions. It is sought when household members or police believe a particular individual is at risk to use firearms to harm themselves or others. If a court agrees, the person can have their firearms taken away. This type of restraining order is not intended to protect a specific individual — but rather, the community at large — from someone believed to be a danger for gun violence. It has been cited as a possible tool to help prevent mass shootings such as the Orlando nightclub shooting.

=== Czech Republic ===
A domestic violence restraining order in the Czech Republic may be issued by a police officer or by a court.

Any police officer has authority under the Police Act to issue restraining order prohibiting a person from entering common dwelling and nearby areas and from contacting the threatened person. Such restraining order is valid for a period of ten days. In case that the threatened person files for court restraining order, the police restraining order remains valid until court renders decision.

A court may issue a domestic violence or stalking restraining order based on application of threatened person for a period of up to one month. This may later be extended if the threatened person files for extension. Extension is possible for necessary period of time, but no more than six months in total.

Breaching of restraining order is a separate crime punishable by up to two years of imprisonment.

=== Saint Lucia ===
On May 20, 2026, a woman was murdered in Castries, Saint Lucia. Her estranged partner was arrested and charged with aggravated murder after it was revealed that he had been harassing her since February and had also assaulted her as a result of her complaints to the local police. The case drew strong condemnation because the country's high court overrode a request by prosecutors and granted release to the man who is accused of killing her despite the preexisting retraining order. In the case of Saint Lucia, both interim orders and restraining orders can be issued by family courts and upheld by law enforcement agencies.

Following the killing, the Royal Saint Lucia Police Force launched an inquiry to determine what can be done to prevent similar cases from happening again. The case drew attention due to the lack of communication between police and the courts as well as the lack of action to uphold the family court's order.

== See also ==
- Anti-Social Behaviour Order (UK)
- Anti-Social Behaviour Injunction (UK)
- Peace bond (Canada)
- Anti-suit injunction
- Anti-Injunction Act
- Burden of proof
- Interim order
- Cease and desist
- Civil Harassment Restraining Order (California)
