= Civil Harassment Restraining Order =

Legal order in California

A Civil Harassment Restraining Order (CHO) is a form of restraining order or order of protection used in the state of California. It is a legal intervention in which a person who is deemed to be harassing, threatening or stalking another person is ordered to stop, with the goal of reducing risk of further threat or harm to the person being harassed. Some restraining orders are limited to domestic partners, but the CHO is not. It is frequently used with the purpose of preventing harassment by co-workers, neighbors, strangers and acquaintances.

Pursuant to California Code of Civil Procedure section 527.6(b), in order to justify a CHO, the harassment must be "such as would cause a reasonable person to suffer substantial emotional distress and must actually cause substantial emotional distress to the victim."

== Provisions and process ==
A CHO can require the harasser to stop initiating contact with the victim, and/or to stay away from the victim's family, workplace, home, and/or school.

A temporary CHO will be in effect until a court hearing can be held, normally within 15–22 days. A "final order" CHO, which may be granted following the court hearing, remains in effect for up to three years.

A CHO does not go into effect until it is served to the person being restrained. Serving the CHO is the responsibility of the petitioner. Service can be carried out by the Sheriff's Department of the county where the harasser lives or works, or by any adult who is not a party named in the case.

== Punishment for violation ==
The crime of stalking is punishable in California by imprisonment in a county jail for not more than one year, or by a fine of not more than one thousand dollars ($1,000), or by both that fine and imprisonment, or by imprisonment in the state prison. The punishment for violating a CHO is 2–4 years of imprisonment.

== Other types ==
The CHO is one of six types of restraining orders used in California. The Emergency Protective Order, the Domestic Violence Temporary Restraining Order and the Criminal Protective ("No Contact") Order, are aimed at protecting against domestic violence. The Elder or Dependent Adult Protective Order is aimed at protecting victims who are over 65 years old and/or who have certain disabilities. The Workplace Violence Restraining Order is aimed at protecting employees from violence in the workplace. Several hundred thousand restraining orders are in effect in California at any time, and between 80 and 95 per cent cover domestic violence involving adults.

== Effectiveness ==
Experts disagree on whether restraining orders are effective in preventing further harassment. A 2010 analysis published in the Journal of the American Academy of Psychiatry and the Law reviewed 15 U.S. studies of restraining order effectiveness, and concluded that restraining orders "can serve a useful role in threat management." However, a 2002 analysis of 32 U.S. studies found that restraining orders are violated an average of 40 per cent of the time and are perceived as being "followed by worse events" almost 21 per cent of the time, and concluded that "evidence of [restraining orders'] relative efficacy is lacking," and that they may pose some degree of risk. A large America-wide telephone survey conducted in 1998 found that, of stalking victims who obtained a restraining order, more than 68 per cent reported it being violated by their stalker.

Threat management experts are often suspicious of restraining orders, believing they may escalate or enrage stalkers. In his 1997 book The Gift Of Fear, well-known American security specialist Gavin de Becker characterized restraining orders as "homework assignments police give to women to prove they're really committed to getting away from their pursuers," and said they "clearly serve police and prosecutors," but "they do not always serve victims."
