= Exclusion zone =

Territory where an authority prohibits specific activities

An exclusion zone is a geographic area in which specific activities are prohibited by an authority. The United States Department of Defense defines an exclusion zone as a territory where an authority prohibits specific activities in a specific geographic area (see military exclusion zone). These temporary or permanent zones are created for control of populations for safety, crowd control, or military purposes, or as a border zone.

== Nuclear disaster exclusion zones ==
Large-scale geographic exclusion zones have been established after major disasters in which radioactive particles were released into the environment:

- Kyshtym disaster (1957)
  - East Ural Nature Reserve – Russia, established 1968.
- Chernobyl disaster (1986)
  - Chernobyl Exclusion Zone – Ukraine, established 1986.
  - Polesie State Radioecological Reserve – Belarus, established 1988.
- Fukushima nuclear disaster (2011)
  - Fukushima Exclusion Zone – Japan, established 2011.

== Ordnance exclusion zones ==
- Zone Rouge – France, established 1919

== Maritime gas leak exclusion zones ==
Two exclusion zones (5 nautical miles (9.3 km; 5.8 mi) and 7 nautical miles (13 km; 8.1 mi)) were established temporarily in the Baltic Sea following the 2022 Nord Stream pipeline sabotage. Dangers to navigation included loss of buoyancy inside the gas plumes and accidental ignition of the gas.

== Border zones ==
Border zones are areas where movement, property ownership or other activity is prohibited or restricted by legislation. Unlike regular territory, border zones are under administrative control of the border authorities. Entrance is generally only with an individual permit. Entering a border zone without authorization is a crime or misdemeanor and grounds for arrest. Border zones are instituted to pinpoint illegal intruders, conceal and obscure and prevent interference with border security procedures and equipment, and thus aid border guards with their work. For example, Russia maintains sizable border zones.

== Natural disaster exclusion zones ==
Similarly, exclusion zones have been established due to natural disasters. There is an exclusion zone on the island of Montserrat, where the long-dormant Soufrière Hills volcano started erupting in 1995 and has continued erupting since. It encompasses the south part of the island, accounting for over half of its land mass and most areas of the island which were populated before the volcano erupted. The volcano destroyed the island's urban center and capital Plymouth, as well as many other villages and neighborhoods. The zone is now strictly enforced; entry into most of the destroyed areas is prohibited, while some areas are subject to restrictions during volcanic activity or open only as a "daytime entry zone".

== Rocket launches ==
Before the launch of a missile or launch vehicle, the area surrounding the launch site and underneath the trajectory of the rocket, called the launch corridor, is cleared. That way, spectators, aviators, seamen and ground controllers are safe from a rocket launch, in particular when the rocket goes errant. Because the flight termination system destroys the rocket in that case, launches are scrubbed or postponed when someone or something enters the launch corridor to prevent damage or harm created by the falling remains of the rocket.

== Construction ==
Exclusion zones are commonly used in the construction industry worldwide. For this purpose they are defined locations to prohibit the entry of personnel into danger areas, established through the risk assessment process for a construction activity. Typically, exclusion zones are set up and maintained around plant and below work at height.

== Protesting ==
With regard to protesting, an exclusion zone is an area that protesters are legally prohibited from protesting in.

Exclusion zones often exist around seats of government and abortion clinics. As a result of protests by the Westboro Baptist Church at the funerals of soldiers killed in the Iraq War, 29 states and the US Congress created exclusion zones around soldiers' funerals. In 2005, the Parliament of the United Kingdom created a one kilometre exclusion zone around itself.

== Restraining orders ==
When a restraining order is issued, an exclusion zone is an area that the respondent is prohibited from entering—often an area surrounding the petitioner's home or workplace. For example, if a Wisconsin harassment restraining order or domestic abuse restraining order is violated, the court may order GPS monitoring of the respondent. If the exclusion zone is breached, the GPS technology notifies law enforcement and the petitioner.

== See also ==
- Disaster area
- Closed city
- Forbidden Zone (disambiguation)
- Military exclusion zone
- No-go area
- Protected area
- Sacrifice zone
- Total Exclusion Zone
