= Hal de Becker =

American dancer and writer (1931–2021)

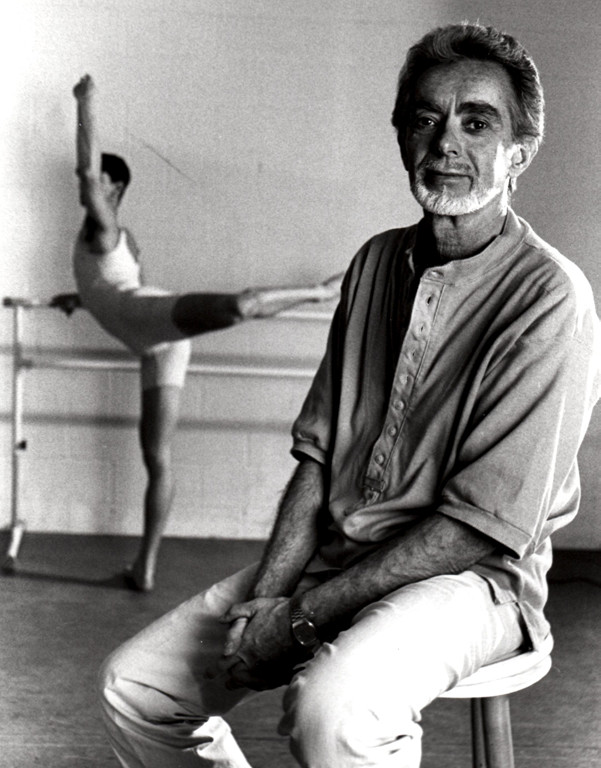
Hal de Becker

Haldor de Becker (July 31, 1931 – May 13, 2021) was an American dancer and writer about dance.

== Personal life ==
The third generation of a theatrical family, de Becker was born in New York City, the son of stage and film actor Harold de Becker and actress Dorothy Daniels de Becker, who performed in Abie’s Irish Rose, the longest running play in Broadway history.

In 1950, he married Frances Katz (died in 1970). They had two children, one of whom is security specialist and author Gavin de Becker.

In 1958, he met dancer Linda Wahner (now Shoemaker) in a ballet class, and they married a year later and divorced in 1979. They have four children, Hal Jr., Belinda, Brian, and Douglas.

== Career ==
De Becker’s career began as a child actor on Broadway. He appeared on stage with Ingrid Bergman, Burgess Meredith, and Elia Kazan, and he appeared in films with Marlene Dietrich, Elizabeth Taylor, and Mickey Rooney with credits in National Velvet and other films.

His contact with the dance world began in 1944 when legendary choreographer George Balanchine set a dance for him and two other young actors appearing in the world premiere of Song of Norway.

He and his wife at the time, Linda Wahner, toured Europe from 1961 to 1964 performing as “Belinda and de Becker.” They appeared with many stars, including Liberace and Nat King Cole. He produced shows in the US and Europe.

De Becker danced principal roles in the Los Angeles City Ballet, Southern California Ballet, and Grand Opera Company of Los Angeles, and musicals including Oklahoma! and Plain and Fancy.

De Becker worked with choreographers David Lichine, Joseph Rickard and Adam Darius. In 1958 he danced in Darius’s ballet Quartet along with Prima Ballerina Cynthia Gregory. His dance teachers included Michel Panaieff, Bronislava Nijinska, Leon Varkas, Michael Brigante, Irina Kosmovska and Carmelita Maracci. Later, in Paris, he trained with Madame Nora and Serge Perette and in Spain with Hector Zaraspe, Juan Magrina and Elsa Von Allen.

In the 1950s, de Becker worked for a private detective agency in Los Angeles to pay for his dance classes, and in 1968 he opened one of the first private detective agencies ever licensed in Nevada. The Las Vegas Sun Newspaper dubbed him as “The Dancing Detective.” For 25 years, de Becker taught hundreds of professional dancers in Hollywood and in Las Vegas including Backstage Dance Studio, and in 1986 he directed the Las Vegas Civic Ballet Company.

De Becker wrote articles for various dance journals, such as Dance Magazine, since the sixties. He was dance critic for the New Times and Las Vegas Sun Newspaper, City Life, Las Vegas Weekly, and Desert Companion magazines. He's also written for Dance Europe, and reviewed for Dance Magazine. From 1995 to 1998 his Las Vegas Beat column appeared in New York’s Dance and the Arts Magazine.

In 2007, de Becker wrote the foreword for Adam Darius’s autobiography, Arabesque Through Time: A Life in Ballet through Three Centuries. De Becker has reviewed nearly every major dance company from the Bolshoi and Kirov (St. Petersburg) Ballets to Paris Opera Ballet, NYC Ballet, Joffrey Ballet, American Ballet Theatre, Twyla Tharp Company and dance troupes from China, New Zealand, Mexico, Korea, Switzerland, Argentina, Africa and elsewhere.

More than 600 of de Becker’s articles appear online in Callback News, reflecting 30 years of history of dance in Las Vegas. Becker died May 13, 2021, in Las Vegas.
