= Forbidden Zone (disambiguation) =

Forbidden Zone is a 1982 musical comedy film.

Forbidden Zone may also refer to:

- Forbidden Zone (France), the World War II Zone Interdite in northern France
- Forbidden Zone (soundtrack), a soundtrack album from the film
- Forbidden Zone (Planet of the Apes), an off-limits area in the Planet of the Apes film franchise
- Forbidden Zone Magazine, a publication edited by Horatio Weisfeld
- "Forbidden Zone", a song by Bedrock
- "The Forbidden Zone", a song by Misfits from Famous Monsters
- The Forbidden Zone (novel), a novel by Whitley Strieber
- "The Forbidden Zone" (Outer Banks), an episode of television series Outer Banks

== See also ==
- Chernobyl Exclusion Zone, an officially designated exclusion area around the site of the Chernobyl nuclear reactor disaster
- Zone interdite, two distinct territories established in German-occupied France during World War II
- Exclusion zone
- Demilitarized zone
- Antics in the Forbidden Zone, a compilation album by Adam Ant
