= Happier Than Ever: A Love Letter to Los Angeles =

2021 American concert film

- Official release poster
- Directed by: Robert Rodriguez; Patrick Osborne
- Based on: Happier Than Ever by Billie Eilish
- Produced by: Michelle An; Chelsea Dodson; Juliet Tierney
- Starring: Billie Eilish
- Cinematography: Pablo Berron
- Edited by: John Paul Guerrera Horstmann (sup.)
- Animation by: Patrick Osborne
- Production companies: Interscope Films; Darkroom Productions; Nexus Studios; Aron Levine Productions; Double R Productions
- Distributed by: Disney+
- Release date: September 3, 2021
- Running time: 65 minutes
- Country: United States
- Language: English

Happier Than Ever: A Love Letter to Los Angeles is a 2021 American concert film directed by Robert Rodriguez and Patrick Osborne, starring singer-songwriter Billie Eilish. It features performances of all 16 tracks from Eilish's second studio album, Happier Than Ever (2021), at the Hollywood Bowl amphitheater. She is accompanied by other musicians, including her brother Finneas O'Connell and the Los Angeles Philharmonic. Inspired by films such as Who Framed Roger Rabbit (1988) and Cool World (1992), A Love Letter to Los Angeles blends live action and animation.

Besides directing, Osborne worked on the animation in collaboration with Nexus Studios, Zoic Studios, and Digital Frontier FX, mixing motion capture footage with rotoscoping techniques. Filming took place for one week in Los Angeles, mostly at the Hollywood Bowl, without a live audience due to the COVID-19 pandemic. The crew aimed to avoid making the performances feel too similar, so they produced distinct color palettes and lighting effects for every song. They often recorded Eilish from close distances, wanting to create a sense of intimacy between her and the viewers.

A Love Letter to Los Angeles was released exclusively to Disney+ on September 3, 2021. Critics praised its performances—which they felt were of similar or better quality compared to the songs' studio versions—as well as its animation, cinematography, and setting. It received nominations for Best Austin Film at the 2021 Austin Film Critics Association Awards, Best Music Film at the 64th Annual Grammy Awards, and Best Longform Video at the 2022 MTV Video Music Awards.

== Plot ==
The film begins by showing a two-dimensional, animated version of American singer-songwriter Billie Eilish in a recording studio. Picking up a microphone, she leaves the place and drives a Porsche to visit landmarks around Los Angeles. Meanwhile, her live-action self performs the tracks from her second studio album, Happier Than Ever (2021), at the Hollywood Bowl.

Eilish starts with the song "Getting Older", covered in blue lighting as the camera spins around her. The lights switch to a red-orange color for "I Didn't Change My Number". A symphony orchestra accompanies her during the next two performances, the first of which is "Billie Bossa Nova". While Eilish sings the next song, "My Future", a wide shot depicts her animated counterpart on the rooftop of the Roosevelt Hotel, looking across the Los Angeles skyline and contemplating. The animated version returns to her Porsche to drive around the city at high speed.

Back at the Hollywood Bowl, the live-action Eilish prepares for a performance of "Oxytocin". As she sings the song, red lights pulsate in the background; the screen turns to black and white during two verses, and she belts some of the closing lines. Nighttime passes, and the next morning, the animated Eilish awakes to find herself among the clouds, about to sprout angel wings. For "Goldwing", a children's chorus performs its first verse, an excerpt from a religious hymn. They act as backing vocals for Eilish during the rest of the number, and the orchestra reappears to provide accompaniment to go with electronic music. The choir and orchestra are gone once the next song, "Lost Cause", begins. Eilish's performance is interspersed with shots of the Porsche as it travels through Los Angeles at night.

During "Halley's Comet", Eilish returns with the orchestra for another number, and she looks up to see the eponymous comet pass through the sky. Her animated version, sitting in an empty restaurant, also notices the comet. Eilish delivers a spoken-word interlude with "Not My Responsibility" and monologues about the public's obsession with her physical appearance. Shown as a silhouette against a black and red background, her animated self slowly takes her clothes off, is picked apart into bifurcated clones, and submerges herself in water. She rises from the water then levitates, after which the camera transitions back to her live-action self, about to perform "Overheated" with red lights and smoke around her. With "Everybody Dies", the animated Eilish visits a cemetery, and the orchestra helps with the instrumentals.

For "Your Power", Eilish duets with her brother Finneas O'Connell, who plays the acoustic guitar. Her animated counterpart arrives at the Palladium theater, after which paparazzi gather around the entrance to take pictures. Close-up shots of Eilish's face repeatedly flash on the screen as she sings "NDA" with distorted vocals, and the orchestra appears one final time for "Therefore I Am". During the performance of the title track, the animated Eilish enters the Hollywood Bowl while a spotlight follows her every move. She notices her live-action counterpart, who sees her and smiles at her, and takes a seat at the front row to watch the performance. The live-action Eilish headbangs and thrashes around the stage once the electric guitar appears in the song. She closes the film with the stripped-back "Male Fantasy"; as the song ends, flowers appear all over the Hollywood Bowl. The animated Eilish, still watching, disappears from sight, a smile on her face.

== Cast ==
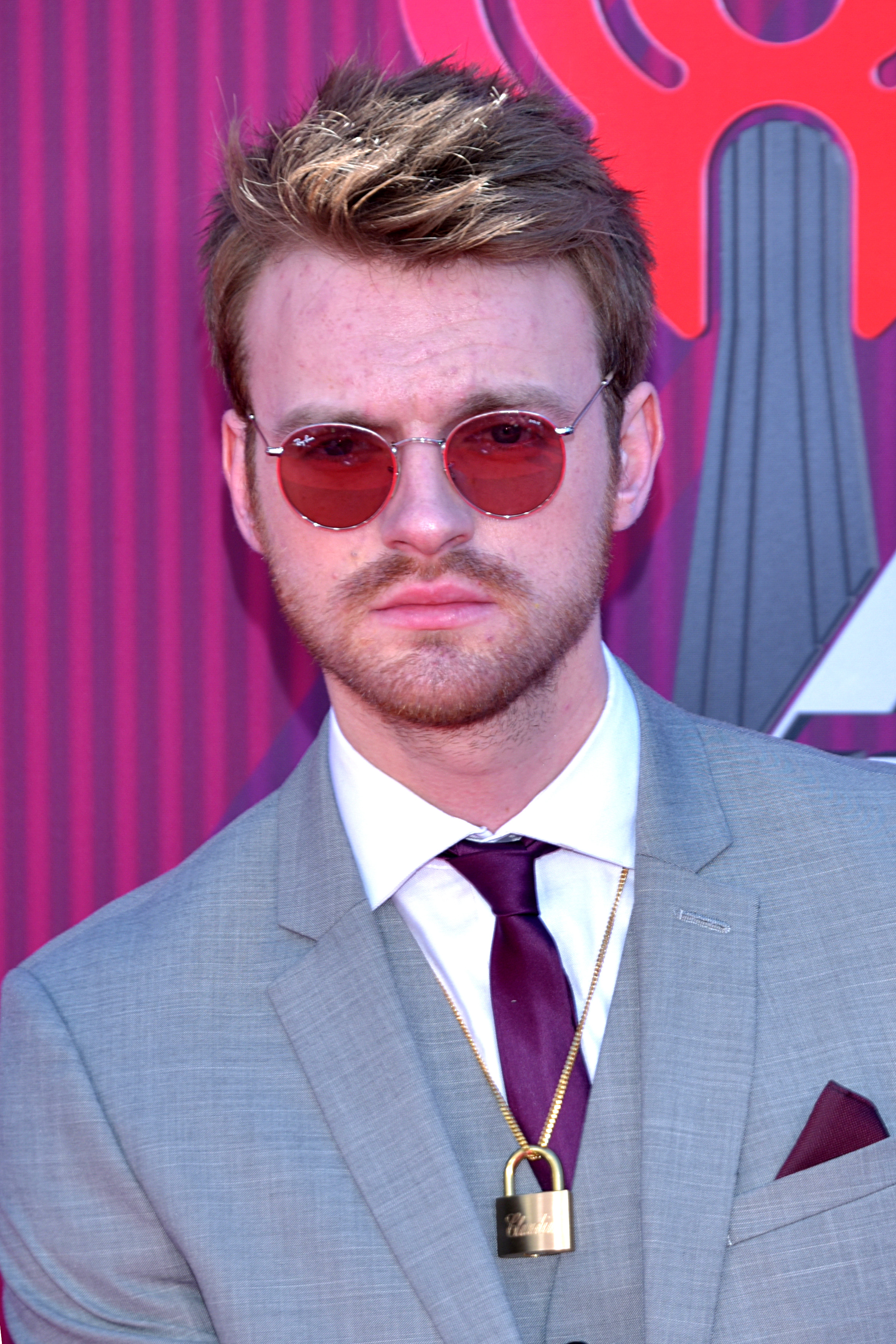
Billie Eilish (left) performs songs for the film with other musicians, including her brother Finneas O'Connell (right).
- Billie Eilish – vocalist
- Finneas O'Connell – Eilish's brother and close collaborator on music
- Romero Lubambo – guitarist
- Gustavo Dudamel – conductor
- Los Angeles Philharmonic
- Los Angeles Children's Chorus
- Andrew Marshall – drummer
- Brady Heiser – precision driver

== Production ==
=== Development ===
Eilish was born and spent her formative years in Los Angeles, developing an intense emotional attachment to the city. As she explained on Good Morning America, "I don't think I'd have any of the same anything if it wasn't for my hometown. I owed Los Angeles some love." She came up with Happier Than Ever: A Love Letter to Los Angeles as a way to pay tribute to the city, intending it to be about self-reflection and growth. With regard to its visual style, she envisioned it to combine live action and animation, a "dimension that [she had] never experimented in", and felt that Disney would help her with the goal.

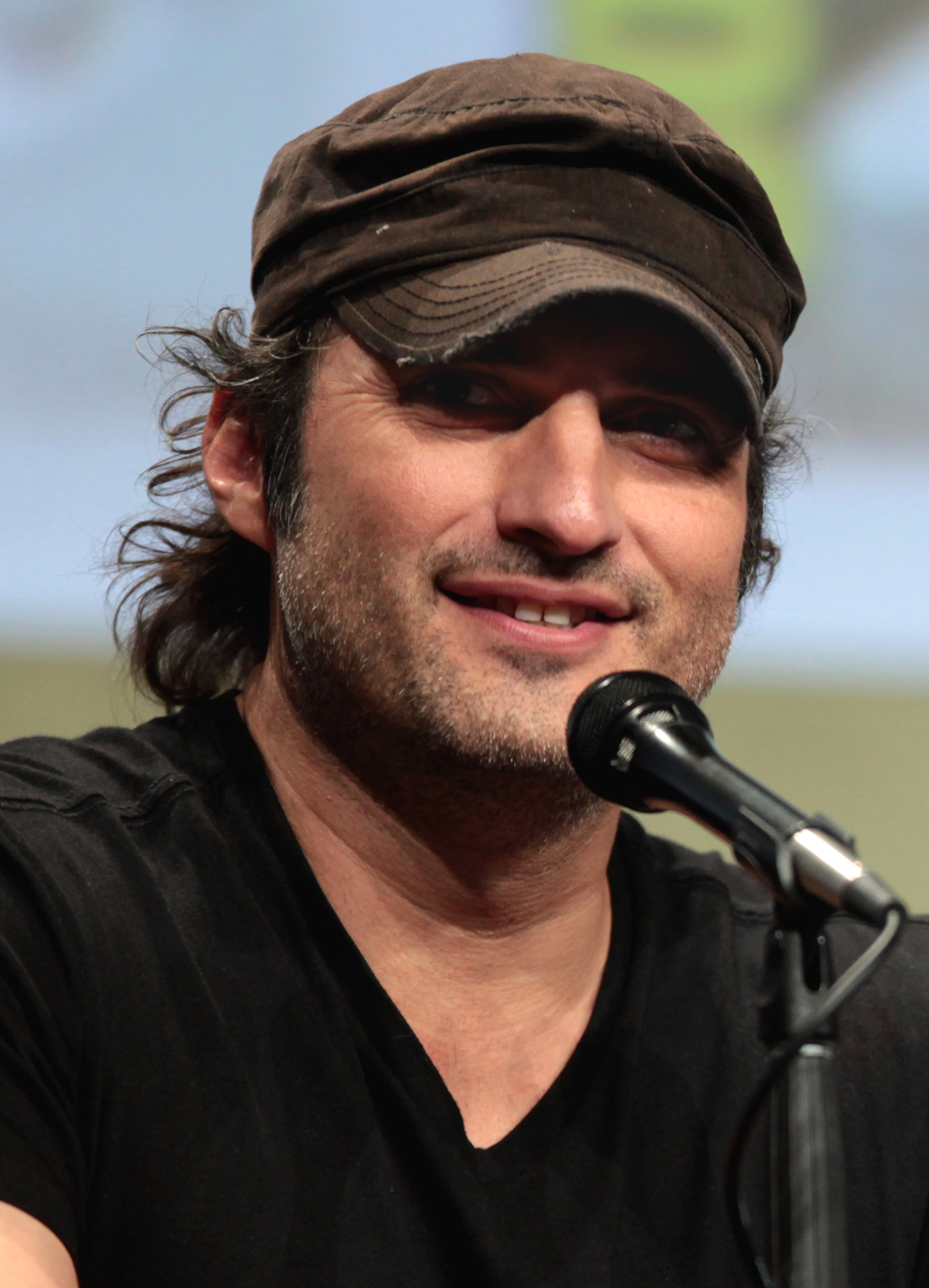
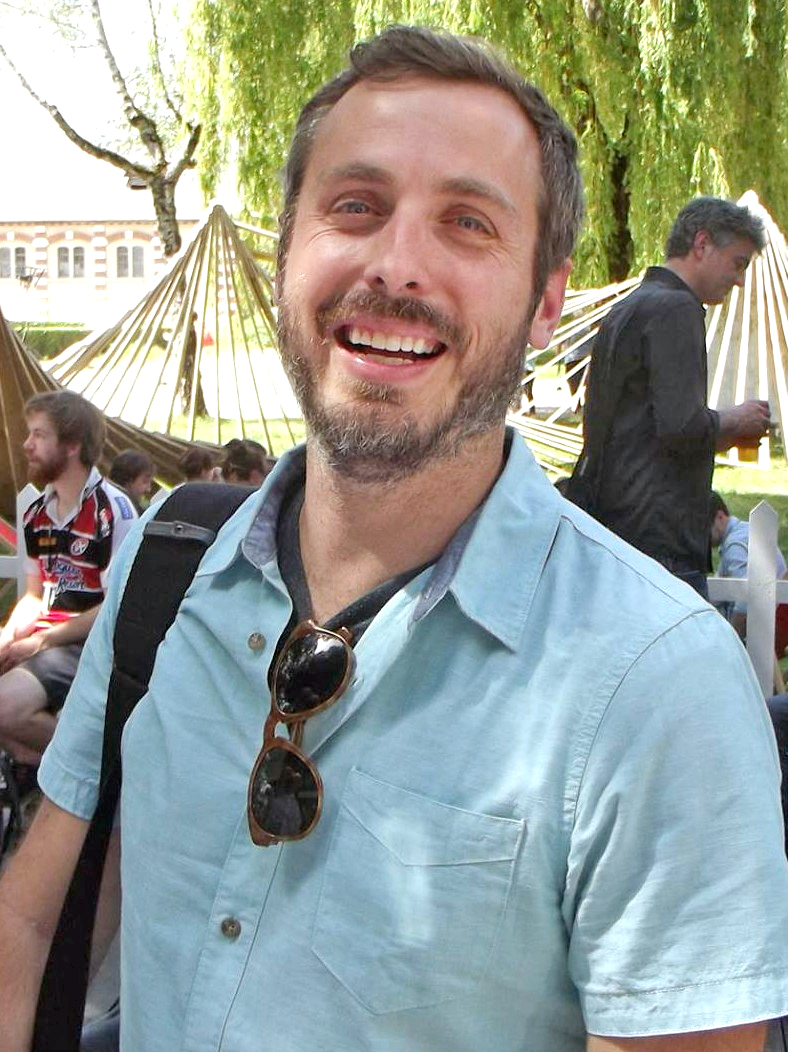
Robert Rodriguez (left) directed the film with Patrick Osborne (right), who handled its animation elements.

Eilish contacted Robert Rodriguez, who she thought was the best candidate for directing, in April or May 2021. He agreed to be involved in the project with his daughter, who was willing to help plan how Eilish's animated counterpart would look. They met with Eilish to discuss ideas for the film and listen to her second studio album, Happier Than Ever, before its release. Rodriguez noticed many of the songs contain explicit lyrics or discuss mature themes, and he wondered how Disney would react including them in the film. For instance, the word fuck appears in the title track, and one verse in "Male Fantasy" mentions using pornography to distract oneself. Disney opted to censor fuck, but not other swear words like shit, damn, or bitches, nor the songs' themes.

Eilish also enlisted the help of Patrick Osborne, an animator for several Disney films, to co-direct and work on the animation and visual design. For the film's setting, she instructed him to create a romanticized depiction of Hollywood, aiming for a vintage noir look. When conceptualizing the aesthetic for A Love Letter to Los Angeles, she drew inspiration from 1980s films. Osborne learned that Eilish was a fan of films like Who Framed Roger Rabbit (1988) and Cool World (1992), which blended live action with animation, so he used them as a benchmark for the visual design. Eilish also told him that she wanted her animated counterpart to feel like an idealized version of herself, and he decided on a femme fatale look for the character to reinforce the film's inspirations.

Work on A Love Letter to Los Angeles began by late June 2021, when Disney+ contacted Nexus Studios about the project. Darkroom and Interscope, Eilish's record labels, handled production for the film in association with Nexus Studios and Aron Levine Productions.

=== Filming ===
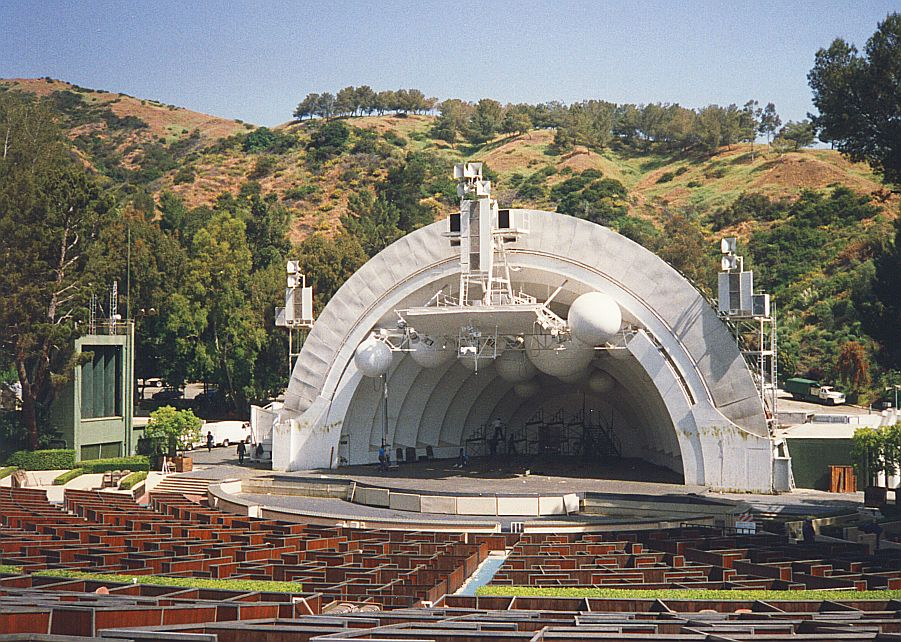
Happier Than Ever: A Love Letter to Los Angeles was filmed at the Hollywood Bowl, albeit without a live audience due to the COVID-19 pandemic.

Filming for the concert sequences took place at the Hollywood Bowl, without a live audience due to the COVID-19 pandemic. Kerry Asmussen directed and choreographed the corresponding scenes. Other musicians who appeared include Finneas O'Connell, drummer Andrew Marshall, guitarist Romero Lubambo, conductor Gustavo Dudamel, and the Los Angeles Philharmonic and Children's Chorus. They performed all 16 songs from the album in the order that they appear on its track list. To avoid accidentally leaking the album to passersby, everyone on set listened to the performances via headphones.

Principal photography was completed within the first week of July. According to Osborne, the crew's shooting schedule at the Hollywood Bowl was from 7 p.m. to 4 a.m. Since A Love Letter to Los Angeles was filmed without a live audience, the crew could move their cameras freely, able to get angles that would be impossible to attain if there were people in the venue. At least 10 cameras were used for acquiring footage, alongside steadicams, cranes, and large Alta-X drones. Scenes that involved the Los Angeles Philharmonic had to be filmed together in one night for production considerations.

For the animated vignettes, the crew recorded in several locations around Los Angeles, using the footage to create the animated character's journey across the city. They placed most of the scenes between each song performance. During filming, they also constructed a reflecting pool, a former feature of the Hollywood Bowl that separated performers from audience members, and built it in place of some of the venue seats. It reflected back to itself, making the Hollywood Bowl look like a full circle instead of a semicircle. In Osborne's view, the caustic motifs reflected by the pool onto the Hollywood Bowl provided visual effects reminiscent of the film Blade Runner (1982).

=== Cinematography ===
Pablo Berron served as the cinematographer for A Love Letter to Los Angeles. He collaborated with aerial director of photography Sam O'Melia, digital imaging technician Dan Skinner, chief lighting technician Konrad Sigurdsson, and Eilish's tour lighting designer Tony Caporale. Once Berron learned everything he needed to know about the project, he was surprised; he compared the shooting schedule to filming four music videos per night. After some consideration, he decided to shoot the film with the Sony Venice camera—due to its higher film speed and better connection—in 6K resolution at a 1.78:1 aspect ratio. Using a 3D lookup table by Company 3 from a past project, the visuals to him felt close to those produced by film stock. Spherical optical instruments were designed by Panavision to, as intended by Berron, create an anamorphic look. He was relieved that there would be no crowd during filming because it meant that all the lights would focus on Eilish instead. In an interview with CineD, Berron explained that this approach allowed him to film her at a very close range, and he "really wanted" to do it because it would create a sense of intimacy between her and the viewers.

The crew aimed to avoid making the performances feel too similar to one another. During a Sony Cine interview, Berron said that they initially planned a vintage, "classic Hollywood old-school" look for every concert scene. After gradually getting to know Eilish's personality, which Berron called "high energy", they decided that sticking to one visual atmosphere throughout the film was not appropriate. Hence, during certain songs, the crew used smoke machines and lasers or went "crazy" with operating the handheld cameras. Caporale also assigned each performance its own color palette and lighting effects, and Berron and his crew listened closely to every song to determine when to adjust the lights. They employed only backlighting techniques during close-up shots of Eilish, set up fill lights to tweak the contrast when necessary, and occasionally put "old movie lights" below her as key lighting, to highlight the theatrical elements for some scenes.

=== Animation ===
Osborne worked on the film's animated sequences with Nexus Studios, with assistance from visual effects companies Zoic Studios and Digital Frontier FX. Sallyanne Massimini served as the studios' visual effects supervisor. According to Osborne, Nexus was responsible for animating the "most magical, more surreal parts of the story", while the other studios worked on the more "grounded stuff". He added that around five or six people based in Los Angeles, London, and Sydney worked on the animation.

Animating Eilish provided a "real challenge" for Osborne, who had 12 weeks to do the job. He had little time to capture her physical disposition for the "old-school" version of the rotoscope process, which he had to do before she embarked on the concert sequences. His solution was to put her in a motion capture suit, having previsualized how the scenes for the corresponding shoot would look, and render the resulting animation. To maintain the 1980s look, Osborne did rotoscoping on top of the motion capture animation.

Osborne used the Blender program to edit the motion capture, of which there were around 90 minutes of footage. He and his team made simple storyboards for the animated sequences, around one drawing for each shot. They created about 12 minutes of animated footage, finishing the editing process by the week of August 20, 2021.

== Marketing and release ==
Eilish announced A Love Letter to Los Angeles on July 22, 2021, eight days before the release of Happier Than Ever. A teaser trailer was revealed alongside the announcement. Another teaser trailer premiered on August 4, and an official trailer premiered 20 days later. The first clip offered a small glimpse of the film's animation; the other two put more focus on that element.

After the trailers were revealed, many journalists immediately compared Eilish's animated character to a Disney Princess, including MTV News's Athena Serrano and Billboard's Gill Kaufman. Ben Pearson of /Film likened her to a less-sexualized version of the character Holli Would from Cool World. Three days before the film screening, Eilish shared a video of the "Oxytocin" performance on social media. Released as a Disney+ exclusive, A Love Letter to Los Angeles premiered worldwide on September 3, 2021. Disney+ made the film available to watch with Dolby Vision and Dolby Atmos.

== Reception ==
=== Thematic analysis ===
Larisha Paul, a writer for the Recording Academy, cited freedom from fame as a recurring theme of A Love Letter to Los Angeles. In the film, Eilish's animated counterpart drives through the Highland Park neighborhood, where she used to live before she moved away due to security concerns such as experiences with stalkers. She references similar privacy-breaching encounters in the lyrics to "Getting Older", "Billie Bossa Nova", and "NDA". According to Paul, the animated counterpart, by travelling around several locations in Los Angeles, demonstrates freedom that the live-action Eilish does not possess, reminding viewers of the life she had before the massive success of her debut studio album, When We All Fall Asleep, Where Do We Go? (2019). As she drives, she sees many billboards used to promote Happier Than Ever by the roads of the city. In Paul's view, this reinforces "the ironclad inescapability of fame" and the conversations that result, such as the ones referenced in the "Not My Responsibility" interlude.

In a review for Billboard, Sydney Urbanek analyzed how Los Angeles might connect to the film's plot. Her argument was that the city functions as a setting for the stories told through the album's lyrics—she interpreted the plot as Eilish's attempt to fix her estranged relationship with Los Angeles, caused by certain traumatic experiences discussed in the songs she performs. To back this up, she cited the album's exploration of Eilish's past relationships and lack of privacy. Urbanek also pointed to one line in the penultimate song, the title track, which reads "I'd never treat me this shitty / You made me hate this city." She called its performance the film's culminating moment, a sentiment Paul shared. Discussing Eilish's encounter with her animated counterpart during the scene, Paul said: "[her] ongoing theme of solitude, and the autonomy found within that [...] speaks to the one consistency between where Eilish has been and where she's headed: herself."

=== Critical response ===
Some critics deemed A Love Letter to Los Angeles a film that Eilish's fans would enjoy. Johnny Loftus recommended watching it in a review for the website Decider, certain that it would "make her thriving fan base swoon", and Jennifer Green, an author for Common Sense Media, wrote that Eilish's followers would "enjoy parsing her lyrics for biographical details and references" while viewing the film. Urbanek considered its release as a way to satisfy fans with live performances before they got to see Eilish during the world tour in support of the album. However, she warned against reducing it to a "mere gift" to them: "there's simply too much at work conceptually to dismiss it as [such]."

The Hollywood Bowl setting was a point of commentary for two critics, who praised it for effectively bolstering the film's tribute premise. The New York Times's Teo Bugbee, who called the choice of location as the "best tribute" to Los Angeles, noted how the concert venue was empty for the whole runtime, arguing that this highlighted the city's "star-struck hauntedness" well. Uproxx contributor Rachel Brodsky agreed and found the choice appropriate because of the Hollywood Bowl's significance to Los Angeles's music and film scenes.

The film received some praise for its animation and cinematography. Urbanek lauded the way that A Love Letter to Los Angeles mixed animation with live action footage, and she found the variety in camerawork appropriate for an album that is varied in themes and tones. Loftus focused on its use of lighting, as well as the aesthetic and color schemes employed for the animated sequences; he believed that the sequences succeeded in establishing the mood for the performances despite looking substantially different from the live footage. In contrast to Urbanek and Loftus, Green wrote the scenes of the animated Eilish were unnecessary. For her, the music and the live-action character do enough to convey the right emotions and the stories told by the songs.

"Goldwing" (from Happier Than Ever: A Love Letter to Los Angeles)
Many reviewers singled out the film's "Goldwing" performance, praising the involvement of the Los Angeles Philharmonic and Children's Chorus.

The concert numbers were another aspect of the film that critics praised. They thought that the songs' live renditions sounded as good as or better than their studio versions, often attributing the quality to the Los Angeles Philharmonic's involvement. Loftus was impressed by Eilish's voice, which he called "striking"—he sensed improvement in her vocals and saw the film as an opportunity for her to prove her ability to sing live. He concluded that the performances in A Love Letter to Los Angeles rightly emphasized Eilish's artistry, music, and nuanced character in spite of all the media narratives about her.

Callie Ahlgrim of Insider selected the live renditions of some of her favorite tracks from the album—"Oxytocin", "Halley's Comet", and the title track—as the film's highlights. Urbanek thought the title track performance lost some impact as a result of Disney's censorship of the word fuck in the lyrics, but she wrote that the song's cathartic nature was still preserved in the film. The "Goldwing" performance was singled out for praise in several reviews; it was regarded as more beautiful than the song's studio version thanks to the presence of the Children's Chorus, of which Eilish used to be a member. The reviewers found their reunion through the film sentimental.

On a more critical note, Ahgrim was not impressed with the film as a whole, finding that without any memorable conceptual risks or a "palpable buzz" from a live audience, A Love Letter to Los Angeles felt underwhelming like the album itself. Meanwhile, Brodsky wrote the absence of an audience made the viewing experience more heartwarming. For Brodsky, criticisms were instead directed towards the performances' monochrome color schemes and Eilish's vocals, which she thought came across as pre-recorded and not live.

=== Accolades ===
A Love Letter to Los Angeles was shortlisted for Best Austin Film at the 2021 Austin Film Critics Association Awards, held on January 11, 2022. Other contenders included the 2020 releases The Carnivores, The Get Together, and Queens of Pain, as well as the winner Without Getting Killed or Caught (2021). On November 23, 2021, the Recording Academy announced the 64th Annual Grammy Awards nominees, which included A Love Letter to Los Angeles for Best Music Film. The ceremony was held on April 3, 2022, and the documentary Summer of Soul (2021) won the award. A Love Letter to Los Angeles was also nominated for Best Longform Video at the 2022 MTV Video Music Awards.
