= MOSAIC threat assessment systems =

Threat-assessment method

MOSAIC threat assessment systems (MOSAIC) is a method developed by Gavin de Becker and Associates to assess and screen threats and inappropriate communications.

Walt Risler of Indiana University assisted in the early development of the method, and Robert Martin, founding commander of the Los Angeles Police Department Threat Management Unit played a role in later development and enhancements. (Martin now heads up the MOSAIC threat assessment Unit at Gavin de Becker & Associates.)

The first MOSAIC systems were developed before 1992. The computer-assisted MOSAIC method is now used by the Supreme Court Police to assess threats to the Justices, by the U.S. Capitol Police for threats against Members of Congress, by police agencies protecting the governors of eleven states, by many large corporations, and by more than twenty top universities.

There are different MOSAIC systems for different situations, including:

- Threats and fear in the workplace
- Threats by students
- Threats against judges and other judicial officials
- Threats against public figures and public officials
- Domestic abuse situations

The MOSAIC method poses a series of questions to users, accompanied by a range of possible answers. For every area of inquiry, the system provides a button for “Premise of the Question” – providing immediate on-screen research citations about why that particular area of inquiry is part of the assessment process. MOSAIC calculates the value of the answers selected by the assessor, and expresses the results on a scale of 1 to 10. Unlike most assessment tools, many of which are paper checklists, MOSAIC automatically produces a full written report, describing the factors that were considered and the selections made by the user.

MOSAIC's on-line resources include a library of research, publications, and training videos that users can access during an assessment.

== Types of MOSAIC ==
=== MOSAIC – public figures (MAPP) ===
MOSAIC for assessing unwanted pursuit of public figures (MAPP) is used by agencies protecting elected and appointed officials, national security agencies, and iconic public figures.

Lieutenant Tom Taylor, four-time president of the National Governor's Security Association, wrote for the Institute of Police Technology and Management:

The consistent way in which MOSAIC methodically guides an evaluation and documents the findings is what sets it apart. In fact, since it places less emphasis on the presence (or lack) of a direct threat, as well as any denials of intent that are uttered in an interview, MOSAIC forces the investigator to look at all of the factors present in the situation.

=== MOSAIC – judicial officials (MAJ) ===
In the mid-nineties, Ted Calhoun of the United States Marshals Service undertook a research project about threats and attacks on federal judges. He studied and analyzed more than 3,000 cases of threats against Federal judges and prosecutors. Calhoun felt that these threats – often made by people whose lives were directly affected by the court – were inherently different from threats to other public figures, with whom the threateners rarely had any real contact.

The marshals service selected the MOSAIC method for applying Calhoun's research, and Gavin de Becker & Associates was commissioned to co-develop a new system: MOSAIC for Assessment of Threats to Judges (MAJ).

The book Hunters and Howlers: Threats & Violence Against Federal Judicial Officials describes the method that evolved into this MOSAIC:

By drawing as complete a mosaic of the threatener and each of his inappropriate communications as possible, de Becker’s system identifies those situations requiring a defensive reaction or a proactive response. The problem is thus managed to the best and least intrusive protection of the victim. The whole approach is informed by an intelligent, comprehensive process of thinking. De Becker’s assessments are the best because he asks the most comprehensive questions, and he consistently asks them of every communication. To do less risks more.

A variation of MAJ is now used by Sheriff's Deputies, bailiffs, and others tasked to protect judges and other judicial officials.

=== MOSAIC – domestic violence (DV-MOSAIC) ===
DV - MOSAIC assesses situations involving domestic violence. As of April 2010, DV - MOSAIC is available at no-cost to the public at www.mosaicmethod.com.

A study funded by the U.S. Department of Justice and published by the National Criminal Justice Reference Service found that when compared to two specific instruments, the Domestic Violence Screening Instrument (DSVI) and the Kingston Screening Instrument for Domestic Violence (K-SID), DV - MOSAIC “performed best in predicting subsequent stalking or threats.” The study also reported that MOSAIC tested highest on “sensitivity,” correctly classifying most of the women that were re-assaulted; had the strongest correlation between the victims’ perception of risk of re-assault and risk of serious harm; captured relevant information equally well with victims of various ethnicities; had scores that were significantly associated with abuse; and provided uniformity of assessment (called Inter-rater Reliability) such that ten different people of different abilities and styles would come up with the same preliminary rating.

The study has also been published by the University of Wisconsin-Madison, The Journal of Interpersonal Violence, the United Nations Entity for Gender Equity, and the Violence Against Women Network.

DV-MOSAIC is used by many police departments around the nation.

“MOSAIC is proving successful. In the suburbs of Los Angeles where it is used, officials attribute much of the 70% decline in domestic violence to the system."

Robert Ressler, a criminologist who worked in the FBI's Behavioral Sciences Unit for 16 years, has referred federal agencies to de Becker. “It has a futuristic ability to predict crime and has a proven track record," Ressler said. "You can predict a crime and deal with a potential situation based on a reading from a database. It will help law enforcement deal with situations successfully."

=== MOSAIC – workplace violence (MAT-W) ===
MOSAIC – workplace violence assesses the three most likely sources of violence in the workplace: angry employees, angry former employees, and stalkers who pursue their targets at the workplace.

The development of this MOSAIC was guided by an Advisory Board of experts and practitioners from industry, government, and law enforcement.

This version of MOSAIC is used by professionals in security departments, legal departments, and human resources offices of large organizations, government agencies, and universities.

=== MOSAIC for assessment of threats by students (MAST) ===
The development of MOSAIC for threats by students (MAST) included an exploration into the pre-incident indicators of explosive school violence. The process drew on more than two hundred experts and practitioners from the fields of education, counseling, psychology, parenting, threat assessment, law enforcement, the judiciary, and students.

The MAST is used by school administrators, counselors, and security/law enforcement officers.

In 1997, Chief James Perrotti of the Yale University police stated that the department used MOSAIC for assessing threats made to Yale professors. He stated that MOSAIC allowed police to prioritize cases and better allocate their resources.

In 2007, the Missouri Campus Task Force report to the Governor of Missouri on campus security and violence prevention included the recommendation that “Each institution should thoroughly evaluate the viability and appropriateness of using assessment tools (e.g. MOSAIC) designed to identify individuals with the potential for violent behavior."

The Superintendent of the L.A. County Office of Education said about MOSAIC: “This is not something where I call you in and give you the third degree. I give myself the third degree because parents want to know why. It just can't be, ‘I don't like your child, I don't like what he does, and I can't explain why.’ This is bringing us to a higher level."

== The Oprah Winfrey Show ==
In April 2010, Oprah Winfrey dedicated an hour-long show to applying the MOSAIC method to domestic violence situations. It was announced on the show that Gavin de Becker was making MOSAIC available to anyone at no cost. Tens of thousands of audience members accessed MOSAIC within the first two weeks.

== Controversy about MOSAIC ==
In an article on the method, psychologist Hill Walker, a professor at the University of Oregon who had studied behavioral disorders in schoolchildren for 34 years told Wired Magazine, "There are some serious validity issues here, some reputation-ruining implications." The developers note that Hill Walker has never seen or used a MOSAIC system, and was commenting on the idea or concept, not the actual method. In a letter to the editor following publication of the article, de Becker wrote that MOSAIC for Assessment of Student Threats (MAST) “is the opposite of profiling in that it is always applied to an actual known individual, and it always explores actual behavior and circumstance.

In an editorial, Professor Laurence Steinberg (who had never seen MOSAIC) questioned the value of the method for predicting violence:

In a nation of 90,000 schools, trying to pick out the dozen or so students a year who might commit murder is like looking for a needle in a haystack the size of Kansas .

De Becker responded that MOSAIC for Assessment of Student Threats (MAST) is never applied to the general population of students, and rather just to those students who self-identify by making a threat.

The NY Times published a letter by de Becker, commenting on Professor Steinberg's editorial.

== Additional Information and Comments Regarding MOSAIC ==
- In 2007, the London Times reported that the borough of Croydon had adopted the DV-MOSAIC model in conjunction with the co-located services approach developed by the Family Justice Center in San Diego.
- In 2001, an article in Sheriff Magazine by Dr. Frederick Calhoun stated: “Although originally designed for assessing threats to Federal judicial officials, MOSAIC's assessments are relevant to all aspects of the judicial setting."
- In 2000, officials from the CIA, Yale University Police Department, the U.S. Capitol Police, the Administrative Office of the United States Courts, the U.S. Marshals Service, the California Highway Patrol, and other experts participated in a comprehensive review of the MOSAIC used for assessment of threats to public figures, and an updated system emerged, now known as the MOSAIC for Assessment of Public-figure Pursuit (MAPP).
- In 2000, the State of California convened a group of experts to study the domestic violence MOSAIC, and suggested changes and enhancements. This led to the development of a special MOSAIC called CAL-MOSAIC which the California Commission on Peace Officer Standards and Training (POST) provided at no cost to each of the State's 600+ police departments.
- In 1999, the Los Angeles and Chicago school districts participated in a project to develop a MOSAIC specially designed for assessing threats made by students. Paul Vallas, Superintendent of Chicago Schools, said at a press conference, "Our schools need to avoid overreacting to threats that aren't substantial, and this system can help them in this respect. We can't be afraid of new technology, we can't be afraid of new approaches. Violence is a fact of life across this country, and we need to equip our principals with the analytical tools to make accurate calls as to which services and intervention support to make available to their students."
- In 1998, MOSAIC was selected by the National Victim Center as one of the “Top Ten Most Promising Strategies and Practices in Using Technology to Benefit Victims.”
- U.S. Attorney General Meese and FBI Director Webster presented a special award to Gavin de Becker for “Outstanding work in developing a threat assessment model that has been of great assistance to law enforcement and criminal justice agencies."
- Los Angeles County Law enforcement agencies adopted MOSAIC in 1997 to help police manage and reduce spousal abuse cases that might escalate to homicide.
