= Your Power =

- Vevo "Official Live Performance" cover

Single by Billie Eilish

from the album Happier Than Ever
- Released: April 29, 2021
- Genre: Folk; downtempo
- Length: 4:05
- Label: Darkroom; Interscope
- Songwriters: Billie Eilish O'Connell; Finneas O'Connell
- Producer: Finneas

Billie Eilish singles chronology
"Lo Vas a Olvidar" (2021)	"Your Power" (2021)	"Lost Cause" (2021)

Music video
- "Your Power" on YouTube

"Your Power" is a song by American singer-songwriter Billie Eilish and the third single from her second studio album, Happier Than Ever (2021). It was released on April 29, 2021, through Darkroom and Interscope Records. A folk and downtempo ballad backed by an acoustic guitar, the song is a plea for people to stop abusing their authority, and it mainly addresses men who exploit vulnerable women. Its lyrics narrate a damaging sexual relationship between a female high school student and an older man, exploring the topics of domestic abuse, sexual harassment, and statutory rape. Eilish wrote "Your Power" with her producer who is her brother, Finneas O'Connell.

Named one of the best songs of 2021 in Variety and The Guardian, "Your Power" was praised for its candid songwriting, the emotional impact of its critiques of abuse, and the relevance of its lyrics to contemporary society. It won Best Video with a Social Message at the 2021 MTV Video Music Awards. During its opening week, the song received 64.2 million streams and sold 8,600 digital copies worldwide. "Your Power" reached the top 10 in over 20 countries; it was Eilish's fifth top 10 song and third top 10 debut in the United States. It peaked at number 6 on the Billboard Global 200 chart, her second top 10 single there.

Eilish directed the music video for "Your Power", which premiered on the same day as the song's release. In it, she sings alone in the Simi Valley while an anaconda wraps itself around her. She first performed the song live on The Late Show with Stephen Colbert, and she included it in the set lists of a 2021 concert film and a 2022–2023 world tour in support of Happier Than Ever. Eilish also performed "Your Power" to protest the overturning of Roe v. Wade by the US Supreme Court, a landmark decision that removed abortion's status as a constitutional right in the country.

== Background and release ==
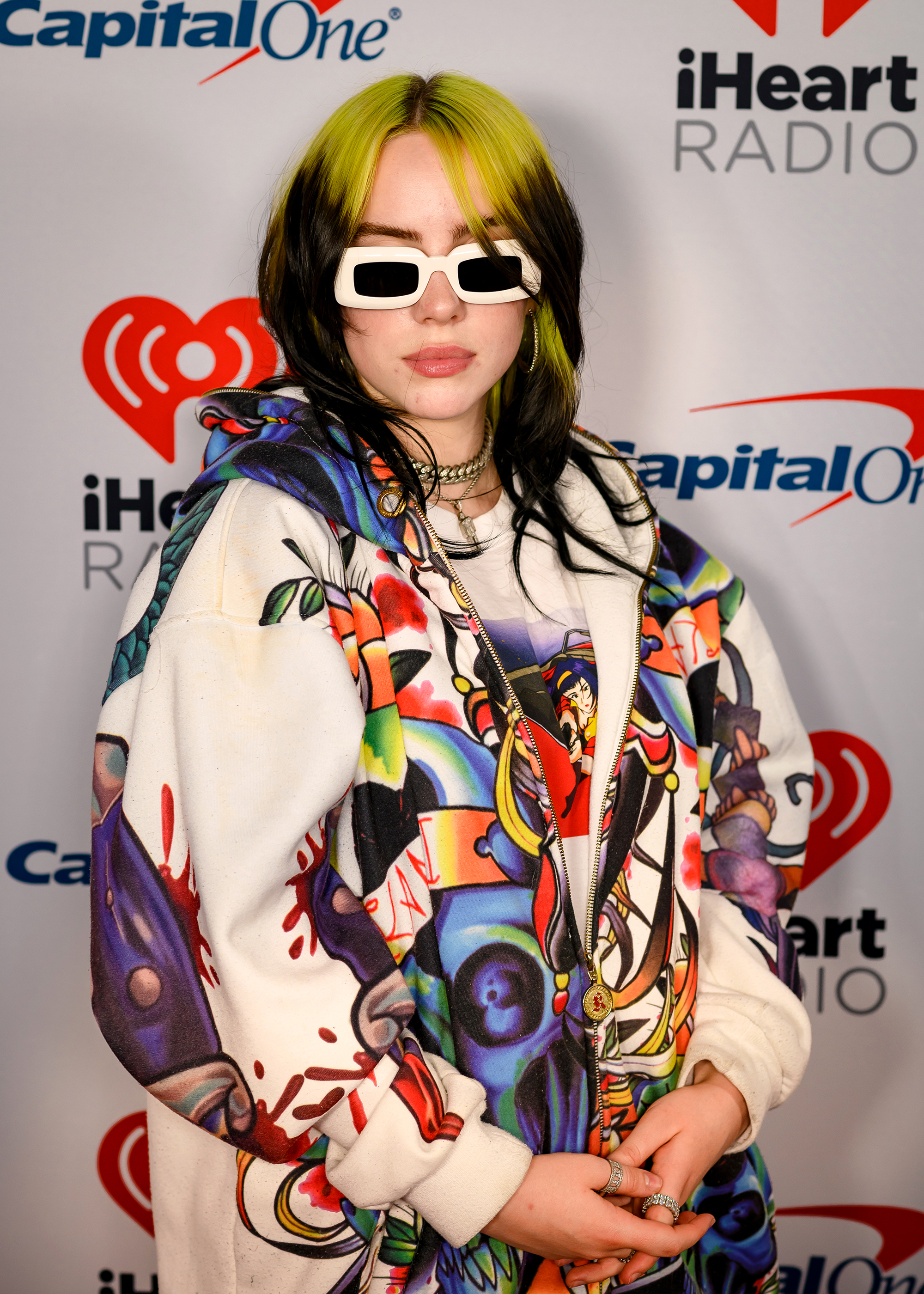
Billie Eilish in 2020, the year in which she began working on her second studio album Happier Than Ever (2021).

At the age of 18, Billie Eilish won five awards at the 62nd Annual Grammy Awards held in 2020. These include Album of the Year for her debut studio album, When We All Fall Asleep, Where Do We Go? (2019). It was a commercial success, debuting at number one on many national record charts and bringing her mainstream fame. Eilish disclosed she would begin work on her second studio album in 2020. Introducing it in an interview with Rolling Stone, she said that "almost none of the songs on this album are joyful". Its lyrical themes include the unhealthy effects of fame and the struggles that young women experience in the entertainment industry, such as misogyny, power imbalance, and emotional abuse. On April 27, 2021, Eilish announced the album's title was Happier Than Ever, and she revealed "Your Power" as the twelfth song on the track list.

A day after the announcement, Eilish posted a nine-second snippet of the song to her social media accounts and previewed the visuals for its music video. "Your Power" was released worldwide as a single from the album the next day. It is the third single from Happier Than Ever, after the 2020 songs "My Future" and "Therefore I Am". In the caption for an Instagram post that accompanied its release, Eilish said it was one of her favorite songs she had written and its candid and confessional lyrics made her feel vulnerable. She continued: "This is about many different situations that we've all either witnessed or experienced. I hope this can inspire change. Try not to abuse your power." Darkroom and Interscope Records promoted the song to alternative and contemporary hit radio stations in the United States on May 4, 2021.

After the song's release, Eilish gave an interview for the British edition of Vogue. She talked about how her life had greatly changed since she was a child, as well as the negative aspects of fame and her struggles with self-acceptance. Dubbing "Your Power" as an "open letter to people who take advantage", Eilish explained that it sought to discuss the confluence between sexual misconduct and body image. To further contextualize its themes, she stated that she was sexually abused during her childhood:

I used to not understand why age mattered. And, of course, you feel like that when you're young, because you're the oldest you've ever been. You feel like you're so mature and you know everything … People forget that you can grow up and realize shit was fucked up when you were younger.

During a BBC 100 Women interview, Eilish said that almost every person would find "Your Power" relatable because she wrote it to be about many people she had met who had had difficulties with handling their influence over others carefully. In her words, "[i]t's hard to have power and it's really hard when you really don't have any power and suddenly you have a lot of power. It's hard not to take advantage of it and abuse it." One example she cited was when she was in a toxic relationship with a man who, according to her, was very physically and emotionally abusive: "When I hear this song, I think of [...] how much trauma he has caused me[.]"

== Music and lyrics ==
"Your Power"
A folk ballad, "Your Power" features a minimalist production that consists of acoustic guitars alongside soft, reverberating vocals from Eilish.

"Your Power" is a folk ballad; (Note: Music critics who described "Your Power" as folk or a ballad include: Vulture's Craig Jenkins: "It's a folk ballad with a timely message"; Billboard's Josh Glicksman: "She's at her most vulnerable in the stripped-back, folky ballad"; Clash's Robin Murray: "'Your Power' is a ... folk-hewn palette"; and The Charlotte Observer's Théoden Janes: "she sang the chilling folk ballad 'Your Power'".) Jordan Darville of The Fader wrote that the song shifts towards indie folk, while Pitchfork's Cat Zhang described the song as downtempo. It has a minimalist production that emphasizes Eilish's vocal performance; she sings in a falsetto vocal register and uses a soft vocal style, and there is a reverberating effect on her voice. Acoustic guitars are the song's primary instruments, indicating a shift from the sound of Eilish's earlier works. The Guardian's Alexis Petridis contrasted the acoustic composition with what he described as the "electronic horror-movie soundtrack approach" of When We All Fall Asleep, Where Do We Go? Furthermore, he argued that "Your Power" drew musical influences from the works of alternative performers Mazzy Star and Lana Del Rey. Other critics compared it to songs by soft rock band America, indie folk singer Phoebe Bridgers, and artists from the Laurel Canyon music scene based on its acoustic production and personal lyrics.

The song is a plea for people to stop abusing their authority—it mainly focuses on men who take advantage of young and vulnerable women, though Eilish wanted it to apply to exploited teenage boys as well. "Your Power" explores the topics of domestic abuse, sexual harassment, and statutory rape. Eilish warns in the chorus: "Try not to abuse your power / I know we didn't choose to change / You might not wanna lose your power / But having it's so strange"; the last chorus replaces the final line with "but power isn't pain". The verses narrate an exploitative sexual relationship between a high school student and an older man that damages her self-perception. Four lines read: "Does it keep you in control? / For you to keep her in a cage? / And you swear you didn't know / You said you thought she was your age." Eilish questions if the man feels any real sense of regret about the relationship.

Eilish stops talking in third person during two lines to discuss her own experiences with sexual abuse, having been conditioned to blame herself for someone else's "devil[ish]" behavior. She explained the lines by saying that abusers often blame the victim for their trauma and self-loathing, which in turn makes the victim blame themselves for what happened to them. In her view, victims should not feel embarrassed or responsible for the abusers' actions, especially if their brains have not fully developed and they cannot tell right from wrong. "Your Power" also references exploitative power dynamics in the music and film industries: "Will you only feel bad if it turns out / That they kill your contract". According to her, however, the song is not solely about her or a specific person from the music industry who abused her, highlighting that the mishandling of authority is a ubiquitous phenomenon: "I would like people to listen to me. And not just try to figure out who I'm talking about [...] You might think, 'It's because she's in the music industry'—no, dude. It's everywhere."

== Music video ==
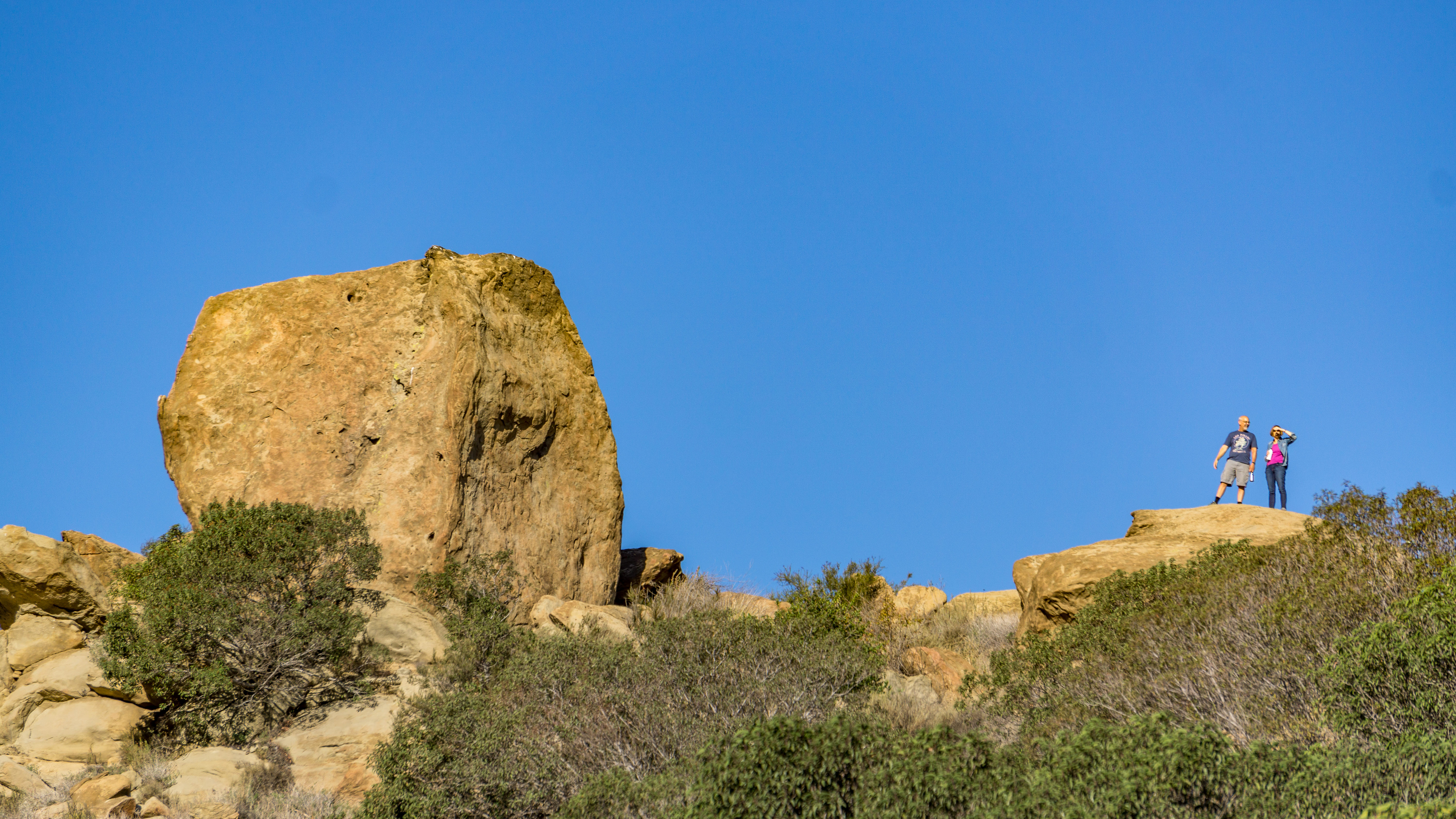
The music video for "Your Power" is set in the deserts of the Simi Valley.

Eilish directed the music video for "Your Power", which premiered the same day as the song's release. This marked the fourth time that she acted as director for her own music videos. Within one week of release, the video amassed over 50 million views on YouTube.

The video, four minutes long, is set in a desert, specifically California's Simi Valley. It depicts Eilish on her own as she sings the lyrics on a mountainside and a drone camera slowly zooms in towards her. Later, an 80-pound (36 kg) anaconda appears and slowly wraps itself around Eilish, as she utters the lines "Does it keep you in control? / For you to keep her in a cage?" An Entertainment Tonight author interpreted the scene as a metaphor for the constricting nature of mishandled authority. The camera zooms out and cuts to black as the anaconda tightens its grip around Eilish and the video comes to an end.

Becky Zhang of Los Angeles magazine commented on the similarities between the music videos for "Your Power" and for Britney Spears's "I'm Not A Girl, Not Yet a Woman" (2002). In terms of visuals, she compared the two based on their sepia color schemes, their panoramic cinematography, and their performers' being alone throughout the video. Zhang also drew parallels between the social contexts in which the videos were made, arguing that Eilish and Spears were asserting their agency and independence as teenage girls transitioning into young adult women in a society dominated by the male gaze.

== Critical reception ==
=== Reviews ===
Music critics praised "Your Power" for its candid and confrontational songwriting, underscoring the emotional impact of its critiques of abuse and the relevance of its lyrics to contemporary society. (Note: Reviews of "Your Power" or Happier Than Ever that praised the song's writing include ones written by: Slate's Carl Wilson; Loud and Quiet's Joe Goggins; Triple J's Al Newstead; Uproxx's Rachel Brodsky; Billboard's Jason Lipshutz; and Rolling Stone's Rob Sheffield.) For Jackson Langford, writer at MTV Australia, the qualities that made the lyrics strong were its "clarity, conciseness and its inability to be interpreted in any other way than what was intended." In four-star reviews of the song, NME's Rhian Daly and The Guardian's Alexis Petridis argued that the juxtaposition between its message's impact and simple, straightforward nature made the lyrics memorable. Petridis compared the "matter-of-fact" nature of the chorus to "reminding someone to take their house keys with them" and concluded that this approach was intentional because powerful people should not have to be told not to abuse their positions of authority. Craig Jenkins wrote in Vulture: "She is all of us wondering why we must move heaven and earth for a crumb of common decency." Other critics found the lyricism in "Your Power" a testament to Eilish's songwriting skills, which Jason Lipshutz of Billboard thought was "underrated [and] overshadowed by the other facts of her superstardom".

Some music journalists also appreciated how Eilish portrayed abuse as a universal experience to which anyone can fall victim at any point in their life. They complimented the lyrics for combining personal anecdotes with other people's stories of abuse and political references to the ways abuse of power is perpetuated in a larger scale, such as how prominent figures in the music industry still hold a high degree of influence despite numerous allegations of workplace harassment. This led two critics to deem the song tantamount to a "real-life horror story", comparing it to the fictional, sinister narratives and "spooky" sounds of When We All Fall Asleep, Where Do We Go? One of them, Pitchfork's Quinn Moreland, argued: "While Eilish's first album was full of overtly scary thoughts—stapled tongues, monsters under beds, teen suicide—the reality presented on 'Your Power' is profoundly more haunting." Several critics placed the song within the context of #MeToo, a social movement started by women to expose and counter sexual misconduct by men in positions of power. (Note: References that make a connection between the song's message and the #MeToo movement include ones written by: the BBC News; The Guardian's Jenessa Williams; The West Australian's Simon Collins; American Songwriter's Jason Scott; MTV Australia's Jackson Langford; Variety's Chris Willman; and NPR's Ann Powers.) In the words of Rachel Brodsky of Uproxx: "Years after the #MeToo revolution of 2017, we're still having conversations about how the rich and powerful regularly abuse their authority. This is Billie's entry into the canon, with a painstakingly delicate track about [...] how we owe it to each other to change things for the better."

The song's acoustic production and Eilish's vocal performance were also praised. Many reviewers felt the simple musical style and soft vocals effectively emphasized the emotional impact that she sought to convey with her lyrics. Some remarked that her pain, anger, and weariness towards abusive men were evident in her voice. Others called her voice angelic, pure, and dreamy, contrasting it with the song's themes which they found harsh and uncomfortable in nature. For Giselle Au-Nhien Nguyen of The Sydney Morning Herald, the "clever trick" that made this difference in tone effective was that "the delivery of these cutting sentiments often sounds sweet, which makes them feel somehow even more acidic", while in Petridis's view, the dissonance works because the "chilling air" that Eilish evokes gets "under your skin rather than in your face." Langford and Daly argued that the simple musical style helps listeners engage with the story and compels them to think critically about the song's themes. Daly wrote: "In keeping things stripped back the song draws you into an intimate space, as its creator confronts you with her haunting voice and uncomfortable tales. Its minimal form leaves the space to make you think, its message lingering long after its time's up—and it's one we should all ponder very closely."

=== Accolades ===
Critics have named "Your Power" one of the best songs in Eilish's discography. Brodsky, writing for Uproxx, listed it as her fourth best in 2021, and Rolling Stone staff members listed it as her third best in 2022. Consequence, NME, and Langford of MTV Australia ranked the song within her top 15. (Note: The NME ranking was published in 2022, whereas the Consequence and MTV Australia rankings were published in 2021.) "Your Power" was also hailed as one of the best songs of 2021 in several publications. These include Billboard (80th out of 100), Consequence (19th out of 50), Variety (17th out of 50), Slate (unranked top 40), Stuff (unranked top 11), and The Guardian (7th out of 20). Ann Powers of NPR regarded the song as one of "the most moving ballads released [in 2021]".

"Your Power" received accolades for its lyrical themes. It won Video for Good at the 2021 MTV Video Music Awards (VMAs) and another award of the same name at the 2021 MTV Europe Music Awards. For her acceptance speech at the VMAs, Eilish called attention to women's rights issues, one of three musicians in the ceremony who made references to contemporary politics. She urged viewers to "protect our young women at all costs" and reminded them that everyone holds some degree of power that they should never abuse. The song was also nominated for Best Direction at the 2021 VMAs, as well as Best Lyrics at the 2022 iHeartRadio Music Awards.

== Commercial performance ==
During its opening week, it entered the US Billboard Hot 100 chart at number 10. It was bolstered by around 22.2 million streams, a radio airplay audience of around 9.6 million, and around 4,500 digital copies sold. "Your Power" marked Eilish's fifth top 10 song and third top 10 debut in the United States, as well as the third consecutive single from Happier Than Ever to reach the top 10 of the Billboard Hot 100. Worldwide, it sold about 8,600 digital copies and was streamed about 64.2 million times in its first week. Approximately 42.7 million streams and 4,000 digital sales were from outside the United States. Consequently, "Your Power" debuted and peaked at number 6 on the Billboard Global 200 and number 5 on the Billboard Global Excl. US. This gave Eilish her second top 10 in the two charts after "Therefore I Am", which peaked on both charts at number 2.

UK listeners streamed "Your Power" 2.1 million times in the first half of its opening week, making it the country's number 1 trending song during the period and setting it on track for a top 10 debut. By the end of the week, it became the highest new entry on the UK Singles Chart. Debuting and peaking at number 5, "Your Power" marked Eilish's seventh top 10 song in the United Kingdom. In Australia, it was her twelfth top 10 song; on the singles chart published by the Australian Recording Industry Association (ARIA), "Your Power" debuted at its peak position of number 9.

By the following week, the song had been streamed over 150 million times globally. It had topped the national singles chart of Lithuania and reached the top 10 in over a dozen other countries worldwide. (Note: Including Finland, Norway, Ireland, Sweden, Switzerland, New Zealand, Portugal, Canada, Latvia, the Czech Republic, Denmark, Malaysia, Singapore, Slovakia, Austria, and the Netherlands. See the charts section for the exact peaks.) In December 2021, Billboard labeled "Your Power" as her eighth biggest song on the Billboard Hot 100. As of April 2024, it has been certified gold by the British Phonographic Industry (BPI) and certified double platinum by the ARIA.

== Live performances ==
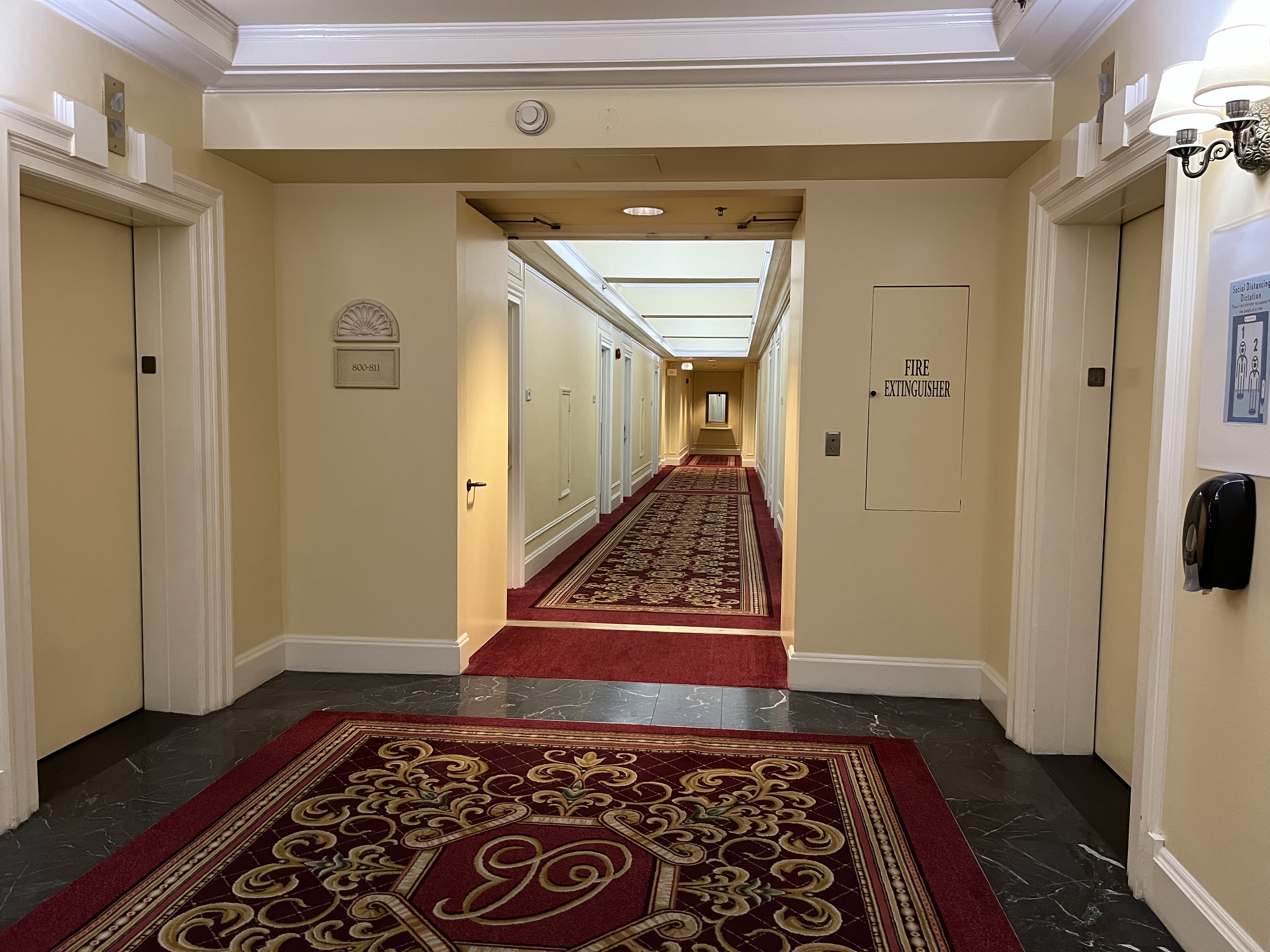
The official live performance for "Your Power" was filmed at a hallway in the Los Angeles Biltmore Hotel, chosen to evoke an intimate Old Hollywood aesthetic.

On May 11, 2021, Eilish appeared on The Late Show with Stephen Colbert for her first live rendition of "Your Power". As with the music video, she performed the song in the middle of a desert. Her brother, Finneas O'Connell, accompanied her on acoustic guitar and provided additional vocals. The two also featured in an official live performance of the song for Vevo that premiered via YouTube on July 18, 2021. Kyle Goldberg directed the video, set in a narrow hallway with walls entirely covered by curtains, and had it filmed all in one take.

Eilish hoped to reinforce the stories present in Happier Than Ever's songs through visual media, using the official live performance for "Your Power" as an opportunity to do so. The video took place at the Biltmore Hotel in Los Angeles, which was selected to convey the intimate, Old Hollywood aesthetic she envisioned for the album. It was chosen to visually evoke the feeling of transitioning into adulthood, one of Happier Than Ever's primary themes, as well. To further this end, Eilish carefully curated the color palettes for the set design, influenced by her synesthetic perceptions of the album. The curtains in the video are orange, juxtaposed against the golden interior of the hotel.

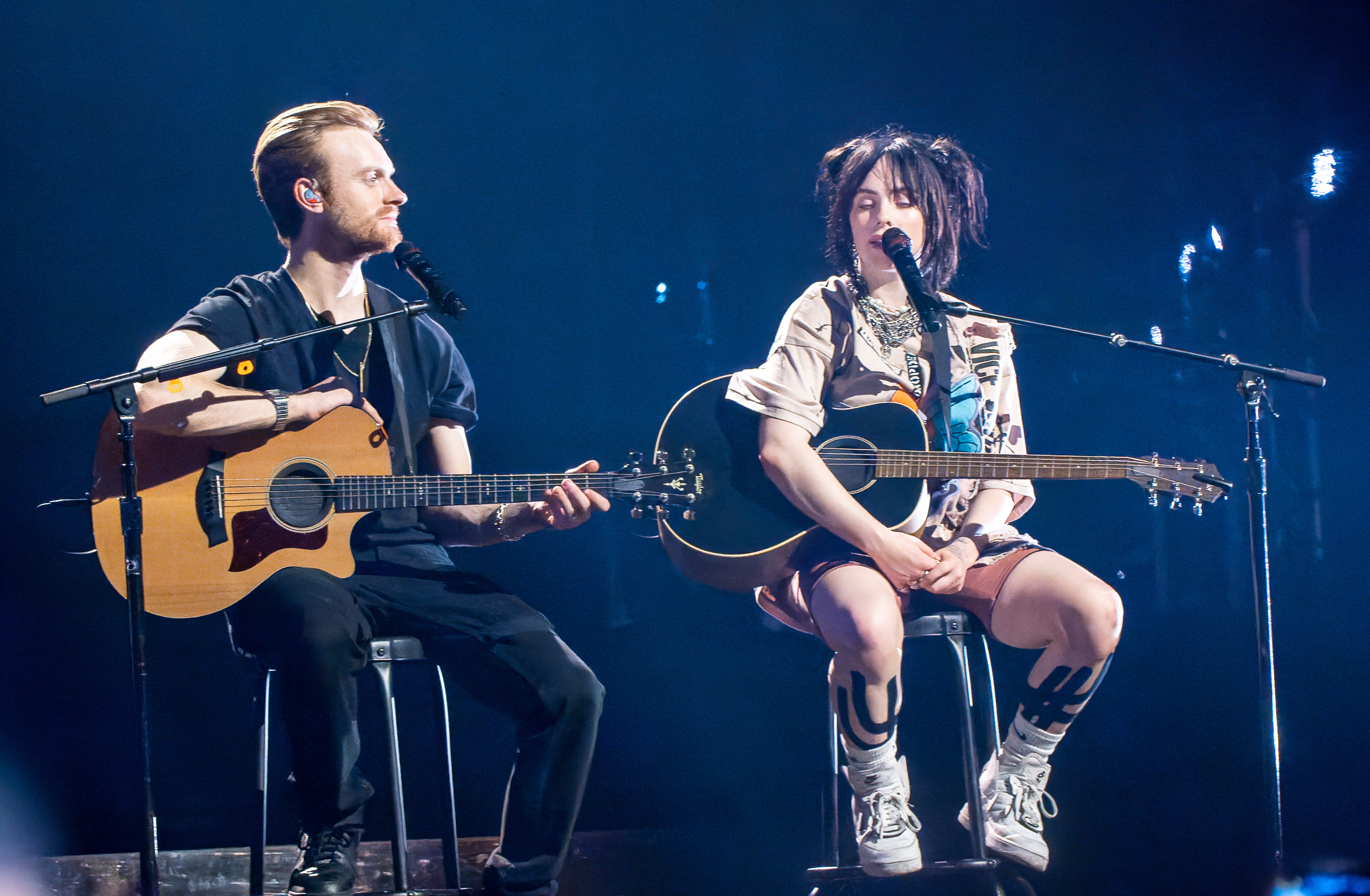
Eilish and Finneas performed "Your Power" during the acoustic interlude of a 2022–2023 world tour in support of Happier Than Ever, playing guitars while seated at center stage.

After the album's release, Eilish performed "Your Power" in Happier Than Ever: A Love Letter to Los Angeles, a concert film that premiered on Disney+ on September 3, 2021. She included it in the set list of a 2022–2023 world tour in support of Happier Than Ever. Eilish, who used the song as the concerts' midpoint interlude, sat down with Finneas to sing together and play acoustic guitars. "Your Power" appeared in Eilish's headlining sets for five music festivals: Life Is Beautiful in 2021, Coachella and Glastonbury in 2022, and Lollapalooza and Reading Festival in 2023. The song was also added to the set list of her 2024-2025 world tour in support of her third studio album Hit Me Hard And Soft, starting with the show in Nashville on November 6, 2024, replacing "Male Fantasy".

Eilish also dedicated live performances of the song to express her views on political causes. She performed it with Finneas to show solidarity for Ukrainian peoples displaced due to the 2022 Russian invasion. The move was done in participation of the worldwide "Stand Up for Ukraine" rally on social media. During that year's Glastonbury Festival, Eilish performed "Your Power" to protest the overturning of Roe v. Wade by the US Supreme Court, a landmark decision that removed abortion's status as a constitutional right in the country. She spoke of the decision: "Today is a really, really dark day for women in the U.S. I'm just going to say that as I cannot bear to think about it any longer in this moment."

== Credits and personnel ==
Credits are adapted from Tidal.

- Billie Eilish O'Connell – vocals, songwriting, vocal engineering
- Finneas O'Connell – production, songwriting, engineering, vocal arranging, acoustic guitar, drum programming, percussion, synth bass, synthesizer
- Dave Kutch – mastering
- Rob Kinelski – mixing
- Casey Cuayo – assistant mixing
- Omar Sheliby – assistant production, songwriting.
- Eli Heisler – assistant mixing

== Charts ==
=== Weekly charts ===
Weekly performance for "Your Power"
Chart (2021)	Peak position
Australia (ARIA)	9
Austria (Ö3 Austria Top 40)	8
Belgium (Ultratop 50 Flanders)	17
Belgium (Ultratop 50 Wallonia)	47
Canada Hot 100 (Billboard)	6
Canada CHR/Top 40 (Billboard)	38
Canada Hot AC (Billboard)	45
Canada Rock (Billboard)	47
Czech Republic Singles Digital (ČNS IFPI)	7
Denmark (Tracklisten)	7
Finland (Suomen virallinen lista)	2
France (SNEP)	41
Germany (GfK)	17
Global 200 (Billboard)	6
Hungary (Single Top 40)	14
Hungary (Stream Top 40)	10
Iceland (Tónlistinn)	16
Ireland (IRMA)	3
Italy (FIMI)	42
Japan Hot Overseas (Billboard Japan)	2
Lithuania (AGATA)	1
Malaysia (RIM)	7
Mexico Ingles Airplay (Billboard)	18
Netherlands (Dutch Top 40)	21
Netherlands (Single Top 100)	9
New Zealand (Recorded Music NZ)	5
Norway (VG-lista)	2
Panama Anglo (Monitor Latino)	14
Portugal (AFP)	5
Singapore (RIAS)	7
Slovakia Airplay (ČNS IFPI)	85
Slovakia Singles Digital (ČNS IFPI)	7
South Korea (Gaon)	149
Spain (Promusicae)	47
Sweden (Sverigetopplistan)	3
Switzerland (Schweizer Hitparade)	4
UK Singles (Official Charts)	5
US Billboard Hot 100	10
US Adult Pop Airplay (Billboard)	31
US Hot Rock & Alternative Songs (Billboard)	2
US Pop Airplay (Billboard)	20
US Rock & Alternative Airplay (Billboard)	17

=== Year-end charts ===
Year-end chart performance for "Your Power"
Chart (2021)	Position
Portugal (AFP)	195
US Hot Rock & Alternative Songs (Billboard)	17

== Certifications ==
Certifications for "Your Power"
Region	Certification	Certified units/sales
Australia (ARIA)	2× Platinum	140,000^{‡}
Austria (IFPI Austria)	Gold	15,000^{‡}
Brazil (Pro-Música Brasil)	3× Platinum	120,000^{‡}
Canada (Music Canada)	2× Platinum	160,000^{‡}
Denmark (IFPI Danmark)	Gold	45,000^{‡}
France (SNEP)	Gold	100,000^{‡}
Italy (FIMI)	Gold	50,000^{‡}
Mexico (AMPROFON)	Gold	70,000^{‡}
New Zealand (RMNZ)	Platinum	30,000^{‡}
Poland (ZPAV)	Gold	25,000^{‡}
Portugal (AFP)	Gold	5,000^{‡}
Spain (Promusicae)	Gold	30,000^{‡}
United Kingdom (BPI)	Gold	400,000^{‡}
^{‡} Sales+streaming figures based on certification alone.

== Release history ==
Release dates and format(s) for "Your Power"
Region	Date	Format	Label	Ref.
Various	April 29, 2021	Digital download; streaming	Darkroom; Interscope	
Italy	April 30, 2021	Radio airplay	EMI	
United States	May 4, 2021	Alternative radio	Darkroom; Interscope	
United States	May 4, 2021	Contemporary hit radio	Darkroom; Interscope	

== See also ==
- List of Billboard Hot 100 top-ten singles in 2021
- List of UK top-ten singles in 2021
- List of top 10 singles in 2021 (Ireland)
- List of top 10 singles for 2021 in Australia
