= Gavin de Becker =

American security specialist and author (born 1954)

- Born: October 26, 1954 (age 72); United States
- Occupations: Security specialist, author
- Known for: The Gift of Fear
- Father: Hal de Becker

Gavin de Becker (born October 26, 1954) is an American security specialist and author. He has worked for governments, corporations, and public figures. Reportedly a billionaire, he runs Gavin de Becker and Associates, a firm that protects and advises prominent public figures, which he founded in 1978. He is also the author of several books, most notably The Gift of Fear: Survival Signals That Protect Us from Violence (1997).

== Early life ==
Gavin de Becker is the son of Hal de Becker (1931–2021), an American dancer and prolific writer about dance.

De Becker describes his childhood as mired in violence. His parents divorced when he was three. His mother was a heroin addict who physically abused him and his sister and once shot his stepfather while de Becker was present in the home. She committed suicide when he was 16, and de Becker subsequently moved in with a friend from school, Miguel Ferrer, the son of actors José Ferrer and Rosemary Clooney. He lived with the family for two years and would go on to work with Clooney as her road manager. He then worked as Elizabeth Taylor's assistant.

== Career ==
In the 1980s, together with the United States Marshals Service, de Becker co-designed the MOSAIC threat assessment systems, which is used to screen threats to Supreme Court justices, members of Congress, and senior officials of the Central Intelligence Agency. Los Angeles County law enforcement agencies adopted MOSAIC in 1997 to help police manage and reduce spousal abuse cases that might escalate to homicide.

In 1983, he investigated stalkers of Olivia Newton-John, Sheena Easton, and Cher. He also provided his services to celebrities such as Richard Burton, Dolly Parton, Jane Fonda, Joan Rivers, Victoria Principal, Tina Turner, and John Travolta.

He was twice appointed to the President's Advisory Board at the United States Department of Justice, in 1982 and 1989.

He has also served as an advisor for the anti-bullying resource Bystander Revolution, senior advisor to the Rand Corporation, and senior fellow at the School of Public Policy, University of California, Los Angeles.

His first book, The Gift of Fear, published in 1997, made it to number one on The New York Times Best Seller list.

In 1997, his firm was hired by Bill Cosby to investigate the murder of his son, Ennis, and the threatening letters his family received after the slaying.

In 1999–2000, he assisted the United States Secret Service in the development of its guide for Protective Intelligence and Threat Assessment Investigations.

His 2008 book, Just 2 Seconds, has been described as a guide for protectors of at-risk people, focusing on five key lessons for those responsible for protecting others. It also includes summaries of incidents from the last several decades for training and analysis. Co-authors of the book are Tom Taylor and Jeff Marquart.

In March 2019, de Becker, who has worked for Jeff Bezos, accused the Saudi Arabian government of hacking Bezos' phone after the National Enquirer published a story about Bezos' extramarital affair. According to the BBC, de Becker, as Bezos' top security staffer, "linked the hack to The Washington Post's coverage of the murder of Saudi writer Jamal Khashoggi at the Saudi consulate in Istanbul." The Daily Beast ran an op-ed, in which de Becker explained the matter of the Saudi hack in detail. Journalist Brad Stone explored whether the Saudi hack was linked in any way to a National Enquirer article about Bezos having an affair. United Nations Special Rapporteur Agnès Callamard conducted an investigation of the Saudi hack. In a public statement, she referred to information that suggested a WhatsApp account belonging to Crown Prince Mohammed bin Salman was used to deploy digital spyware on Bezos' phone "in an effort to influence, if not silence" The Washington Post's reporting on the kingdom. A United Nations report noted that "the iPhone infiltration occurred from May to June in 2018, when the phones of Jamal Khashoggi's associates, Yahya Assiri and Omar Abdulaziz, were also hacked, allegedly using malware called Pegasus." The United Nations experts stated, "During the same period, Mr. Bezos was widely targeted in Saudi social media as an alleged adversary of the Kingdom. This was part of a massive, clandestine online campaign against Mr. Bezos and Amazon, apparently targeting him principally as the owner of The Washington Post."

== Political donations ==
De Becker has donated to both Democrats and Republicans in the past. In 2019, he supplied New York Governor Andrew Cuomo's re-election campaign with $5,000. In 2022, he contributed $5,000 to Wisconsin Republican Senator Ron Johnson's re-election campaign. Also in 2022, he gave Duke Aiona a total of $6,000 for his bid to become Governor of Hawaii.

In 2023, he donated $4.5 million to the Super PAC that supported Robert F. Kennedy Jr.'s 2024 presidential campaign. In 2024, de Becker donated $10 million to the same Super PAC, then had $9.65 million returned to him. De Becker and the American Values Political Action Committee both confirm that this was "bridge funding", meaning it could be returned if it was not needed or used.

== Expert witness testimony ==
De Becker has provided expert witness testimony in many cases, including the successful prosecution of Arthur Richard Jackson, the assailant of actress Theresa Saldana. He later led a national campaign to keep Jackson incarcerated. He also testified in the civil case against the employer of murderer Rodney Garmanian.

De Becker testified in the successful 1994 civil case Khawar v. Globe International, Inc., in which Francis Pizzulli represented the plaintiff. The case arose when the tabloid Globe accused an uninvolved man of being the actual assassin of Senator Robert Kennedy. Globe attempted to have de Becker's testimony dismissed by a higher court, but the decision was ultimately upheld by the California Court of Appeals.

De Becker advised the Los Angeles County District Attorney in the prosecution of Robert Bardo, the murderer of actress Rebecca Schaeffer, and was a consultant on the prosecution of O.J. Simpson for the murder of his ex-wife, Nicole Brown Simpson, and Ron Goldman, and the successful civil action against Simpson. His role in the O.J. Simpson cases is described in several books on the case, including those written by Marcia Clark, Christopher Darden, Jeffrey Toobin, and Daniel M. Petrocelli.

== Cultural references ==
- Actor Miguel Ferrer, who played FBI agent Albert Rosenfield in the 1990s television show Twin Peaks, reported that his character was based on Gavin de Becker. Ferrer reportedly knew de Becker since high school.
- Actor Robert De Niro met extensively with de Becker in preparation for his role in The Fan (1996).
- In Patricia Cornwell's 2004 novel Trace, character Lucy Fairinelli describes using "the Gavin de Becker style of simulated combat" for training security staff.
- In season 2, episode 10 of Entourage (2005), character Vincent Chase states, "I should have Gavin de Becker come sweep the house for bugs".
- In 2006, after Hollywood agent Ari Emanuel called on the entertainment industry to blacklist actor Mel Gibson for things he said when arrested for drunk driving, de Becker responded through an essay published in a full-page ad in The Hollywood Reporter. He defended Gibson, saying that "alcoholism cannot be used to prove anti-Semitism". In the essay, de Becker asked Emanuel: "A drunken spouse spits out the words 'I never loved you anyway!' Is that truth? A drunken idiot boasts that he can 'take on the whole goddamn bunch of you, you bastards, come on, 'I'll kick your asses'. Is that truth?"
- Actress Meryl Streep, who describes de Becker as a friend, said The Gift of Fear informed her portrayal of a nun in the 2008 movie Doubt.
- De Becker gave the eulogy for Garry Shandling; referring to a long-term feud with studio head Brad Grey, de Becker said, "Over the years, many people asked me, 'Why doesn't Garry have a family?' My answer was, 'Of course he had a family.' He created the Sanders family, which was as much a family as anything, and he had this family [motioning to the crowd]. And even Brad Grey had a role in his family, because every family has an uncle or a cousin who is a sociopath."
- De Becker gave a eulogy at Carrie Fisher's memorial service. Fisher and de Becker reportedly attended high school together and are described as friends. "The first time I had sex was at Carrie's house", de Becker stated in the eulogy, and added, "It wasn't with Carrie, but she arranged it".
- De Becker and novelist Bruce Wagner officiated at the wedding of Carrie Fisher's daughter, actress Billie Lourd. Lourd said, "It was the most hysterically brilliant and touching officiating in the history of officiating".
- Writer and director Zach Cregger says his 2022 film, Barbarian, was inspired by The Gift of Fear.

== Philanthropy ==
De Becker founded and funded Patient Pets, providing pet therapy for violently inclined patients at Atascadero State Hospital in California.

De Becker is the creator and primary funder of the Naqaqa Giving Foundation, which supports disadvantaged people in Fiji and in southern Africa.

== Personal life ==
In the 1990s, de Becker was romantically linked to singer Alanis Morissette and actress Geena Davis.

De Becker and his wife have been married since 2007 and have two sons. He has also raised eight adopted children, now adults.

De Becker was friends with former Beatle George Harrison, who reportedly died at de Becker's home. De Becker is also friends with Brooke Shields. Interviewed in the documentary Pretty Baby: Brooke Shields, he told of her confiding in him after she was raped by an acquaintance.

== Writing ==
Books

- —— (1997). The Gift of Fear and Other Survival Signals that Protect Us From Violence. Boston: Little, Brown and Company. ISBN 978-0-316-23502-0. OCLC 36143575.
- —— (1999). Protecting the Gift: Keeping Children and Teenagers Safe (and Parents Sane). New York, NY: Dial Press. ISBN 978-0-385-33309-2. OCLC 317692059.
- —— (2002). Fear Less: Real Truth about Risk, Safety, and Security in a Time of Terrorism. Boston: Little, Brown and Company. ISBN 978-0-316-08596-0. OCLC 48746358.
- —— (2008). Just 2 Seconds: Using Time and Space to Defeat Assassins. Gavin de Becker Center for the Study and Reduction of Violence. ISBN 978-0-615-21447-4. OCLC 0615214479.
- ——; de Becker, Gavin (2013). Destruction of Innocence: The Friedman Case & How Coerced Testimony and Confessions Harm Children, Families and Communities for Decades After the Wrongful Convictions Occur. Boston: Little, Brown and Company. ASIN B00CX3LJ48.
- —— (2025). Forbidden Facts: Government Deceit & Suppression About Brain Damage from Childhood Vaccines. New York City: Skyhorse Publishing. ASIN B0FJ2PQ7XJ.

Forewords

- To Have or to Harm: True Stories of Stalkers and Their Victims. 1994. Grand Central Pub. ISBN 978-0446365437
- Surviving a Stalker: Everything You Need to Know to Keep Yourself Safe. 2000. Balance. ISBN 978-0971144705
- Beauty Bites Beast: Awakening the Warrior Within Women and Girls. 2001. B3 Books. ISBN 978-0971144705
- A Girl's Gotta Do What a Girl's Gotta Do. 2003. Rodale Books. ISBN 978-1579546397
- On Combat: The Psychology and Physiology of Deadly Conflict in War and Peace. 2004. Human Factor Research Group Inc. ISBN 978-0964920514
- Embracing Fear: How to Turn What Scares Us into Our Greatest Gift. 2005. Harper One. ISBN 978-0062517753
- The End of War: How Waging Peace Can Save Humanity, Our Planet, and Our Future. 2010. Easton Studio Press. ISBN 978-1935212119
- The Kidpower Book for Caring Adults: Personal Safety, Self-Protection, Confidence, and Advocacy for Young People. 2012. ISBN 978-0979619175
- The Safety Godmothers: The ABCs of Awareness, Boundaries and Confidence for Teens. 2014. B3 Books. ISBN 978-0971144736
- Self-Defense for Women: Fight Back. 2016. YMAA Pruductions Center. ISBN 978-1594394928
- SUICIDE, COVID-19, and KETAMINE: How a Little Known Drug May Save Lives. 2021. Tailwind Productions. ISBN 978-0978709440
- The Revolutionary Ketamine: The Safe Drug That Effectively Treats Depression and Prevents Suicide. 2023. Skyhorse. ASIN B0BTZ6Q9KY
- The Brass Check: The Seminal Exposé on News Media Censorship and Propaganda. 2026. Clydesdale. ASIN B0BTZZC383
