= Francis Pizzulli =

American attorney

- Born: Francis Cosmo Joseph Pizzulli; May 16, 1950
- Died: December 2, 2021 (aged 71)
- Education: UC Santa Barbara; Gould School of Law
- Known for: genetics; cloning; intellectual property rights; bioethics; defamation law
- Children: 2

Francis Cosmo Joseph Pizzulli (May 16, 1950 – December 12, 2021) was an American attorney. He is known for specializing in bioethics issues and the impact of emerging technologies, genetics and cloning, intellectual property rights and defamation law. His case Khawar v. Globe International was a landmark case that went to the US Supreme Court and sided with the plaintiff, his client.

== Early life and education ==
Francis Pizzulli was born the son of Rosa and Dominick Pizzulli. He had a brother, Cosimo Pizzulli.

He attended UC Santa Barbara majoring in physics. He completed graduate work at the University of Southern California, Gould School of Law, awarded "Order of the Coif". He was admitted to The State Bar of California in 1975.

Pizzulli was a research fellow at the Institute of Society, Ethics and the Life Sciences, Hastings Center, New York.

== Career ==
Pizzulli was a member of The California Advisory Committee on Human Cloning appointed in early 1999. The twelve members were made up of varied professional backgrounds and political viewpoints.

Cases that Pizzulli tried and prevailed include:

The decision clarifies that their reputations are not grist for the mill for journalists who have no good faith in spreading the truth.

— Francis Pizzulli
- Khawar v. Globe International was a landmark defamation case in which Francis Pizzulli successfully represented the plaintiff. The case went to the U.S. Supreme Court, which ruled in favor of the plaintiff, reinforcing key principles of defamation and reputational harm.
- Francis Pizzulli represented record producer Creed Taylor and jazz artist George Benson in a legal dispute against Warner Bros. Records, claiming interference with their recording contract. In a notable "David vs. Goliath" outcome, Pizzulli successfully secured a jury verdict in favor of Taylor and Benson, recovering over six million dollars from the record label.

Pizzulli was a scholar focusing and commenting on bioethics issues and the impact of emerging technologies, genetics and cloning, writing numerous research papers. Papers authored by Francis Pizzulli, as well as papers in which he is cited or footnoted include:

- Asexual reproduction and genetic engineering: a constitutional assessment of the technology of cloning
- Is There A Right To Clone? Constitutional Challenges To Bans On Human Cloning
- Reproductive Misconception: Why Cloning Is Not Just Another Assisted Reproductive Technology
- Georgetown University Archival Resources—Pizzuli, Francis C., 05/07/1981-08/30/1982 File — Box: 9, Folder: 4

== Personal life ==
Pizzulli has two daughters.
