= Gavin de Becker and Associates =

Security consulting firms

- Type: Private
- Industry: Security and consulting firm
- Founded: 1978
- Headquarters: Los Angeles, California, United States
- Key people: Gavin de Becker (founder)
- Website: gdba.com

Gavin de Becker and Associates (GDBA) is a security and consulting firm that offers personal protection detail services to individuals and businesses. Headquartered in Los Angeles, the company operates in 27 cities and seven countries.

== History ==
Gavin de Becker and Associates was founded in 1978 by Gavin de Becker. In 2013, GDBA took on TPG Growth as a minority investor. In 2019, Gavin de Becker bought back 100% of the company.

== Services ==
Gavin de Becker and Associates is a "threat assessment and security firm" that provides private security and also offers protection training courses.

They have provided services to corporations, government agencies, and schools. Clients reportedly include the Central Intelligence Agency, Federal Bureau of Investigation, and "the 90 most prominent families in the world". Over the years, public client references have included Theresa Saldana, Madonna, Cher, Michelle Pfeiffer, Michael J. Fox, Barbra Streisand, Jeff Bezos, John Travolta and Robert F. Kennedy Jr.

In September 2023, protectors from de Becker’s firm surrounded and detained a man who demanded to see presidential candidate Robert F. Kennedy Jr., whom the firm reportedly protects. The man displayed fake United States Marshals identification and was found to be carrying two loaded handguns. Kennedy posted on X: “I’m very grateful that alert and fast-acting protectors from Gavin de Becker and Associates (GDBA) spotted and detained an armed man who attempted to approach me at my Hispanic Heritage speech at the Wilshire Ebell Theatre in Los Angeles tonight.”

The following month, protectors from de Becker’s firm arrested an intruder at Kennedy’s Los Angeles home. After being released by police, the same intruder entered the property again and was again arrested by de Becker’s employee. The two incidents made national news and led to calls for presidential candidate Kennedy to be granted United States Secret Service protection.

== The Private Suite ==
Gavin de Becker and Associates opened the Private Suite at the Los Angeles International Airport on May 15, 2017, which is described by The Wall Street Journal as "a remote terminal for VIPs, celebrities, CEOs", and anyone willing to pay for privacy. De Becker reported the Private Suite will soon open at John F. Kennedy International Airport.

In November 2017, it was reported that GDBA opened a version of the Private Suite at the Westfield Century City shopping center, which provides VIP shoppers the opportunity of a private shopping experience.

== See also ==
- Bill McGlashan, founder and managing partner of TPG Growth
- XOJET
