= The Gift of Fear =

1997 self-help book by Gavin de Becker

The Gift of Fear: Survival Signals That Protect Us from Violence
- First edition cover
- Author: Gavin de Becker
- Language: English
- Genre: Self-help
- Publisher: Little, Brown and Company
- Publication date: 1997
- Publication place: United States
- Pages: viii, 334 (first edition)
- ISBN: 978-0-316-23502-0
- OCLC: 36143575

The Gift of Fear: Survival Signals That Protect Us from Violence is a 1997 self-help book by Gavin de Becker, a security specialist. The book argues that every individual should learn to trust the inherent "gift" of their gut instinct when it comes to situations of danger or potential violence, as these instincts are often our most reliable means of self-protection.

The Gift of Fear spent 16 weeks on The New York Times Bestseller List.

== Summary ==
By finding patterns in stories of violence and abuse, de Becker seeks to highlight the inherent predictability of violence. The book explores various settings where violence may be found—the workplace, the home, the school, dating—and describes what de Becker calls pre-incident indicators (PINS). By noticing PINS (events and behaviors that often precede violence), individuals can better predict violence before it occurs and, therefore, take the necessary precautions and actions to stay safe. The Gift of Fear also describes de Becker's MOSAIC Threat Assessment Systems, which have been employed by various celebrities and government agencies to predict and prevent violence.

In The Gift of Fear, de Becker describes pre-incident indicators to watch for:

- Forced teaming: This is when a person implies that they have something in common with their chosen victim, acting as if they have a shared predicament when that isn't really true. Speaking in "we" terms is a mark of this, i.e. "We don't need to talk outside... Let's go in."
- Charm and niceness: This is being polite and friendly to a chosen victim in order to manipulate them by disarming their mistrust.
- Too many details: If a person is lying they will add excessive details to make themselves sound more credible to their chosen victim.
- Typecasting: An insult is used to get a chosen victim who would otherwise ignore one to engage in conversation to counteract the insult. For example: "Oh, I bet you're too stuck-up to talk to a guy like me." The tendency is for the chosen victim to want to prove the insult untrue.
- Loan sharking: Giving unsolicited help to the chosen victim and anticipating they'll feel obliged to extend some reciprocal openness in return.
- The unsolicited promise: A promise to do (or not do) something when no such promise is asked for; this usually means that such a promise will be broken. For example: an unsolicited, "I promise I'll leave you alone after this," usually means the chosen victim will not be left alone. Similarly, an unsolicited "I promise I won't hurt you" usually means the person intends to hurt their chosen victim.
- Discounting the word "no": Refusing to accept rejection.

== Reception ==
The Gift of Fear spent 16 weeks on The New York Times Bestseller List.

A reviewer for Time found the book's section on stalking to be the most informative part. An instructor at the FBI Academy opined that the information in The Gift of Fear would be useful for law enforcement officers by providing "tools for assessing potentially violent encounters". In the Boston Globe, Zachary Dowdy described it as "a how-to book that reads like a thriller". Julie Barlow described The Gift of Fear in The Gazette as "surprisingly credible" and "strangely reassuring". Carolyn Hax continued to recommend The Gift of Fear in her syndicated advice column 20 years after the book's publication.
