= Billie Eilish: The World's a Little Blurry =

2021 American documentary film directed by R. J. Cutler

- Promotional release poster
- Directed by: R. J. Cutler
- Written by: R. J. Cutler
- Produced by: R. J. Cutler; Anthony Seyler; Trevor Smith; Chelsea Dodson; Michelle An; Jay Peterson; Todd Lubin; Mark DiCristofaro
- Starring: Billie Eilish; Finneas O'Connell; Maggie Baird
- Edited by: Lindsey Utz; Greg Finton
- Music by: Billie Eilish; Finneas O'Connell
- Production companies: Neon; This Machine Filmworks; Matador Content; Lighthouse Management & Media; The Darkroom; Interscope Films; Boat Rocker Media
- Distributed by: Apple TV+
- Release date: February 26, 2021
- Running time: 140 minutes
- Country: United States
- Language: English
- Budget: $1–2 million

Billie Eilish: The World's a Little Blurry is a 2021 American documentary film written and directed by R. J. Cutler and centered around singer-songwriter Billie Eilish. The film details Eilish's rise to fame since the release of her 2016 single "Ocean Eyes" and the creative process behind Eilish's debut studio album When We All Fall Asleep, Where Do We Go? (2019), with the title referencing a lyric from the album track "ilomilo". The film was released in select theaters via Neon and on Apple TV+ on February 26, 2021.

== Synopsis ==
Rather than a linear narrative, the film follows several intertwining plot threads in a stream-of-consciousness style.

- Billie is seen performing her song "Bored" at a small venue in Salt Lake City. After seeing a fan being carried out after getting hurt, she reminds the audience that they need to be okay because they are the reason that she is okay. Billie explains that she doesn't refer to her fans as "fans", but rather as a part of her. She acknowledges her audience as people going through tough times just as she is.
- Billie and her brother Finneas are shown rehearsing and recording various songs in Billie's bedroom, including "Bury a Friend", "I Love You", "All the Good Girls Go to Hell", "My Strange Addiction", and "Wish You Were Gay".
- Billie's mom Maggie and her best friend Bella helps Billie show off her idea for the music video for the song "When the Party's Over". At the shoot for the video, Billie becomes frustrated due to various mistakes. After the shoot, Billie says that she wants to direct the rest of her music videos by herself.
- Several scenes depict Billie's relationship and eventual breakup with her boyfriend, whose name is given only as "Q".
- Billie is shown earning her learner's permit and later, her driver's license. She is presented with her dream car, a matte black Dodge Challenger, as a present for her 17th birthday.
- Billie is shown struggling with her health issues, including her Tourette syndrome and the pain in her legs due to excessive jumping at her shows. She reveals how injuries ended her dancing career when she was younger. She reveals that she used to cut her wrists with blades in the bathroom.
- Billie and her family meet Katy Perry and Orlando Bloom at Coachella's backstage area. Katy gives Billie advice and tells her that she can call if she needs anything. Billie performs and is unimpressed with her performance due to technical difficulties and forgetting lyrics to the song "All the Good Girls Go to Hell". During Ariana Grande's set, Justin Bieber surprises Billie and they meet for the first time.
- While on tour, Billie becomes frustrated with being forced to meet multiple media people that she deems "random". Subsequently, she deals with the fallout from this incident. At a show in Milan, Billie sprains her ankle at the start of the performance which leaves her embarrassed. She apologizes to the audience and says that she'd rather not give them a show versus give them a mediocre one.
- The film ends where it began, showing Billie singing "Ocean Eyes", the song that launched her career.

== Production ==
Recording for the film began in 2018 and was completed in early 2020. The Hollywood Reporter wrote in December 2019 that the film was developed with a budget between $1 million and $2 million. They also claimed that the film was worth $25 million before being purchased by Apple TV+, but this claim was later denied by Eilish's team.

== Release ==
Billie Eilish: The World's a Little Blurry was officially announced via Eilish's social media profiles on September 28, 2020, but had begun developing attention as soon as late 2019, and more after she discussed it in several press interviews in early 2020.

The film was released in select theaters and IMAX via Neon and on Apple TV+ on February 26, 2021.

== Critical response ==
Billie Eilish: The World's a Little Blurry was released to widespread acclaim. On review aggregator Rotten Tomatoes, 96% of 100 critics have given the film a positive review, with a 7.3 out of 10 average rating. The website's critical consensus reads, "Billie Eilish: The World's a Little Blurry offers an enlightening -- and sometimes uncomfortable -- look behind the scenes of a young star's ascension." According to Metacritic, the documentary received "generally favorable" reviews, based on an average score of 70 out of 100 from 23 critic reviews. It was nominated for four Primetime Emmy Awards, including the Outstanding Sound Mixing for a Nonfiction or Reality Program, Outstanding Sound Editing, Outstanding Picture Editing, and Outstanding Music Direction.

=== Awards and nominations ===
Award	Date of ceremony	Category	Recipient(s)	Result	Ref.
Primetime Creative Arts Emmy Awards	September 12, 2021	Outstanding Music Direction	Aron Forbes	Nominated	
Primetime Creative Arts Emmy Awards	September 12, 2021	Outstanding Picture Editing for Variety Programming	Greg Finton, Lindsay Utz, Azin Samari	Nominated	
Primetime Creative Arts Emmy Awards	September 12, 2021	Outstanding Sound Mixing for a Nonfiction or Reality Program	Elmo Ponsdomenech, Jason Gaya, Aron Forbes, Jae Kim	Nominated	
Primetime Creative Arts Emmy Awards	September 12, 2021	Outstanding Sound Editing for a Nonfiction or Reality Program (Single or Multi-Camera)	Richard E. Yawn, Robert Getty, Steven Avila, Shawn Kennelly, Michael Brake, Melissa Kennelly, Vince Nicastro	Nominated	
Critics' Choice Documentary Awards	November 14, 2021	Best Music Documentary	Billie Eilish: The World's a Little Blurry	Nominated	
Seattle Film Critics Society	January 17, 2022	Best Documentary Feature	Billie Eilish: The World's a Little Blurry	Nominated	
Cinema Eye Honors	March 1, 2022	Audience Choice Prize	Billie Eilish: The World's a Little Blurry	Nominated	
American Cinema Editors Awards	March 5, 2022	Best Edited Documentary – (Non-Theatrical)	Greg Finton, Lindsay Utz	Nominated	
Golden Reel Awards	March 13, 2022	Outstanding Achievement in Sound Editing – Feature Documentary	Richard Yawn, Michael Brake, Rob Getty, Steven Avila, Shawn Kennelly, Melissa Kennelly, Vince Nicastro	Nominated	
Cinema Audio Society Awards	March 19, 2022	Outstanding Achievement in Sound Mixing for Television Non Fiction, Variety or Music – Series or Specials	Jae Kim, Elmo Ponsdomenech, Jason "Frenchie" Gaya, Aron Forbes, Jeffrey Roy, Shawn Kennelly	Nominated	
