= Live at Third Man Records (Billie Eilish album) =

- Sleeve of the Record Store Day 2020 edition

Live album by Billie Eilish
- Released: December 6, 2019
- Recorded: November 6, 2019
- Label: Darkroom; Interscope; Third Man

Billie Eilish chronology
When We All Fall Asleep, Where Do We Go? (2019)	Live at Third Man Records (2019)	Happier Than Ever (2021)

Live at Third Man Records is the first live album by American singer-songwriter Billie Eilish, released on December 6, 2019. It was recorded at an acoustic live show with her brother Finneas O'Connell at the Third Man Records headquarters in Nashville, Tennessee on November 6, 2019.

The record received a reissue for Record Store Day on August 29, 2020, subsequently debuting at number 55 on the Billboard 200, in addition to topping both the Vinyl Albums and Tastemakers charts, after selling 13 thousand copies in that week.

== Background and recording ==
Eilish performed a secret show in The Blue Room at Jack White's Third Man Records headquarters in Nashville, Tennessee on November 6, 2019, along with her brother Finneas O'Connell. She performed in front of only 250 audience members and sang several tracks off her EP Don't Smile at Me, and her album When We All Fall Asleep, Where Do We Go?. The live album is a recording of a "secret, invite-only" acoustic show.

The siblings started their performance with "Wish You Were Gay". The stage lights turned red as Eilish moved into "All the Good Girls Go to Hell". She then transitions into "Ocean Eyes", which Dave Paulson of The Tennessean described as one of the shows "acoustic highlights". Eilish sings "Bad Guy", butchering the first chorus lyrics. Eilish continues the performance with "Idontwannabeyouanymore", "Bury a Friend", "Come Out and Play", "Copycat", "I Love You" and "Bellyache". Eilish concludes the performance with "When the Party's Over".

Eilish told the audience she was impressed with the technology behind making the live album. Pointing to the live video feed of the recording process, saying "Do you see that? They’re like making my voice onto a thing. Like right now! That’s crazy." Eilish also thanked Jack White for "inspiring a whole generation of people to do what they want." Eilish mentioned, "All I ask is we all try to be just happy we're alive, and happy that we're breathing. That we're here and we're safe. That's pretty much it, for us to all be grateful that we're here right now."

== Release and packaging ==
The album was released independently under Third Man Records on December 6, 2019 with limited release. It was only made available through two Third Man stores, each in Detroit and Nashville. On August 29, 2020, during Record Store Day, the record was made available through multiple independent record stores internationally, which led to a massive surge in sales.

Most copies of the record appear on blue opaque vinyl with a plain black sleeve featuring "Billie Eilish" four times in yellow text, positioned together to make up a square. Limited edition copies of the record feature a splatter of blue paint on the sleeve applied by Eilish herself. An alternate "extremely" limited edition features a lime green vinyl record, but no extra decorations on the sleeve.

== Reception ==
Professional ratings
Review scores
Source	Rating
AllMusic	3.5/5 stars

Neil Z. Yeung, writing for AllMusic, described the album "captures all the charm of [Eilish's] [live] [performance]", and continues saying it "allows Eilish's down-to-earth personality and effortless vocals to shine." He concludes with saying "while not required listening for an average fan, this rarity is a gift for the diehards." Eliot Hill of iHeartRadio described it as a "great vinyl". Writing for the Nashville Scene, D. Patrick Rodgers said it was "delightful and intimate show featuring acoustic performances from Eilish and her brother and collaborator Finneas O'Connell."

The record received a major drop in August 2020 during Record Store Day and sold 13 thousand copies in the sales week ending September 3. It debuted at number 55 on the Billboard 200, and topped both the Vinyl Albums and Tastemakers charts. The record was the best selling release of the Record Store Day week, which was also the biggest week of vinyl sales in 2020.

== Track listing ==
All tracks are written by Billie Eilish O'Connell and Finneas O'Connell, except where noted.

=== Side one ===
1. "All the Good Girls Go to Hell"
2. "Ocean Eyes" (F. O'Connell)
3. "Bad Guy"
4. "Idontwannabeyouanymore"
5. "Bury a Friend"

=== Side two ===
1. "Come Out and Play"
2. "Copycat"
3. "I Love You"
4. "Bellyache"
5. "When the Party's Over" (F. O'Connell)

== Charts ==
Chart performance for Live at Third Man Records
Chart (2020)	Peak position
US Billboard 200	55
US Indie Store Album Sales (Billboard)	1
US Top Alternative Albums (Billboard)	6
