= Where Do We Go? World Tour =

2020 concert tour by Billie Eilish

- National tour by Billie Eilish
- Promotional poster for the tour
- Location: U.S., North America
- Associated album: When We All Fall Asleep, Where Do We Go?
- Start date: March 9, 2020
- End date: March 12, 2020 (Note: Intended to conclude on September 7, 2020; the remainder of the tour was cancelled due to the COVID-19 pandemic.)
- Legs: 1 (4 initially)
- No. of shows: 3 (54 initially)

Billie Eilish concert chronology
- When We All Fall Asleep Tour (2019); Where Do We Go? World Tour (2020); Happier Than Ever, The World Tour (2022–23)

The Where Do We Go? World Tour was the fifth concert tour and first arena tour by American singer-songwriter Billie Eilish, in support of her debut studio album When We All Fall Asleep, Where Do We Go? (2019). The tour commenced on March 9, 2020 in Miami, Florida at American Airlines Arena and concluded prematurely on March 12, 2020 in Raleigh, North Carolina at PNC Arena, before the COVID-19 pandemic forced the closure of performance venues. It was planned to conclude on September 7, 2020 in Jakarta, Indonesia at Indonesia Convention Exhibition, before Eilish canceled future shows due to the pandemic.

== Background and development ==
The name of this tour essentially finishes the name of the previous tour (When We All Fall Asleep Tour), of which the same album was promoted. The tour was officially announced through Eilish's Instagram account on September 27, 2019. Eilish posted a picture along with the tour dates and venues. Then, on February 28, 2020, Eilish announced Jessie Reyez as the support act for North America and European dates.

Eilish was planned to embark on a sold-out North American tour in March 2020 and was set to tour South America and Europe before heading to Asia. On March 16, 2020, Eilish announced the postponement of her North American tour due to the COVID-19 pandemic, and on May 13, 2020, Eilish announced the postponement of the remainder of the tour for the same reason. On December 3, 2020, Eilish announced that the tour would be officially cancelled and gave fans a full refund, while also informing them that they would be granted new tickets for her next tour.

== Set list ==
This set list is from the concert on March 9, 2020 in Miami. It is not intended to represent all shows from the tour.

1. "Bury a Friend"
2. "You Should See Me in a Crown"
3. "My Strange Addiction"
4. "Ocean Eyes"
5. "Copycat"
6. "When I Was Older"
7. "8"
8. "Wish You Were Gay"
9. "Xanny"
10. "The Hill" (Markéta Irglová cover)
11. "Lovely"
12. "Listen Before I Go"
13. "I Love You"
14. "Ilomilo"
15. "Bellyache"
16. "Idontwannabeyouanymore"
17. "No Time to Die"
18. "When the Party's Over"
19. "All the Good Girls Go to Hell"
20. "Everything I Wanted"
21. "Bad Guy"
22. "Goodbye"

== Tour dates ==
List of concerts, showing date, city, country, venue, opening acts, attendance, and gross revenue
| Date (2020) | City | Country | Venue | Opening act | Attendance | Revenue |
|---|---|---|---|---|---|---|
| March 9 | Miami | United States | American Airlines Arena | Jessie Reyez | 13,498 / 13,498 | $1,530,997 |
| March 10 | Orlando | United States | Amway Center | Jessie Reyez | 14,090 / 14,090 | $1,719,309 |
| March 12 | Raleigh | United States | PNC Arena | —N/a | 14,869 / 14,869 | $1,688,854 |
| Total | | | | | 42,457 / 42,457 (100%) | $4,939,160 |

=== Cancelled shows ===
List of cancelled concerts, showing date, city, country, venue, reason for cancellation and reference
| Date (2020) | City | Country | Venue | Reason | Ref. |
|---|---|---|---|---|---|
| March 13 | Philadelphia | United States | Wells Fargo Center | COVID-19 pandemic | |
| March 15 | New York City | United States | Madison Square Garden | COVID-19 pandemic | |
| March 16 | Newark | United States | Prudential Center | COVID-19 pandemic | |
| March 18 | Washington, D.C. | United States | Capital One Arena | COVID-19 pandemic | |
| March 19 | Boston | United States | TD Garden | COVID-19 pandemic | |
| March 20 | Brooklyn | United States | Barclays Center | COVID-19 pandemic | |
| March 23 | Detroit | United States | Little Caesars Arena | COVID-19 pandemic | |
| March 24 | Chicago | United States | United Center | COVID-19 pandemic | |
| March 25 | Indianapolis | United States | Bankers Life Fieldhouse | COVID-19 pandemic | |
| March 27 | Nashville | United States | Bridgestone Arena | COVID-19 pandemic | |
| March 28 | St. Louis | United States | Enterprise Center | COVID-19 pandemic | |
| April 3 | Inglewood | United States | The Forum | COVID-19 pandemic | |
| April 4 | Inglewood | United States | The Forum | COVID-19 pandemic | |
| April 5 | Inglewood | United States | The Forum | COVID-19 pandemic | |
| April 7 | San Francisco | United States | Chase Center | COVID-19 pandemic | |
| April 8 | Sacramento | United States | Golden 1 Center | COVID-19 pandemic | |
| April 10 | Tacoma | United States | Tacoma Dome | COVID-19 pandemic | |
| April 11 | Vancouver | Canada | Rogers Arena | COVID-19 pandemic | |
| April 15 | Denver | United States | Ball Arena | COVID-19 pandemic | |
| April 17 | Omaha | United States | CHI Health Center Omaha | COVID-19 pandemic | |
| May 25 | Guadalajara | Mexico | Arena VFG | COVID-19 pandemic | |
| May 27 | Mexico City | Mexico | Palacio de los Deportes | COVID-19 pandemic | |
| May 30 | São Paulo | Brazil | Allianz Parque | COVID-19 pandemic | |
| May 31 | Rio de Janeiro | Brazil | Jeunesse Arena | COVID-19 pandemic | |
| June 2 | Buenos Aires | Argentina | DirecTV Arena | COVID-19 pandemic | |
| June 3 | Buenos Aires | Argentina | DirecTV Arena | COVID-19 pandemic | |
| June 5 | Santiago | Chile | Movistar Arena | COVID-19 pandemic | |
| June 7 | Bogotá | Colombia | Movistar Arena Bogotá | COVID-19 pandemic | |
| July 9 (Note: The July 9, 2020 show at Valdebebas, Madrid was supposed to be part of Mad Cool.) | Madrid | Spain | Valdebebas | COVID-19 pandemic | |
| July 10 (Note: The July 10, 2020 show at Passeio Marítimo de Algés, Lisbon was supposed to be part of NOS Alive.) | Oeiras | Portugal | Passeio Marítimo de Algés | COVID-19 pandemic | |
| July 13 | Amsterdam | Netherlands | Ziggo Dome | COVID-19 pandemic | |
| July 14 | Berlin | Germany | Mercedes-Benz Arena | COVID-19 pandemic | |
| July 15 | Cologne | Germany | Lanxess Arena | COVID-19 pandemic | |
| July 17 (Note: The July 17, 2020 concert in Rho, Italy at AREA EXPO Experience was supposed to be part of IDAYS.) | Rho | Italy | AREA EXPO Experience | COVID-19 pandemic | |
| July 18 (Note: The July 18, 2020 concert in Paris, France at Hippodrome De Longchamp was supposed to be part of Lollapalooza Paris) | Paris | France | Hippodrome De Longchamp | COVID-19 pandemic | |
| July 19 (Note: The July 19, 2020 concert was relocated from Werchter to Antwerp due to lack of security guarantees at Werchter Festivalpark.) | Antwerp | Belgium | Sportpaleis | COVID-19 pandemic | |
| July 21 | Manchester | England | AO Arena | COVID-19 pandemic | |
| July 22 | Manchester | England | AO Arena | COVID-19 pandemic | |
| July 24 | Birmingham | England | Utilita Arena | COVID-19 pandemic | |
| July 26 | London | England | The O_{2} Arena | COVID-19 pandemic | |
| July 27 | London | England | The O_{2} Arena | COVID-19 pandemic | |
| July 29 | London | England | The O_{2} Arena | COVID-19 pandemic | |
| July 30 | London | England | The O_{2} Arena | COVID-19 pandemic | |
| August 23 | Seoul | South Korea | KSPO Dome | COVID-19 pandemic | |
| August 25 | Shanghai | China | Mercedes-Benz Arena | COVID-19 pandemic | |
| August 28 | Taipei | Taiwan | Taipei Arena | COVID-19 pandemic | |
| August 30 | Hong Kong | Hong Kong | AsiaWorld–Arena | COVID-19 pandemic | |
| September 2 | Yokohama | Japan | Yokohama Arena | COVID-19 pandemic | |
| September 5 | Pasay | Philippines | Mall of Asia Arena | COVID-19 pandemic | |
| September 7 | Jakarta | Indonesia | Indonesia Convention Exhibition | COVID-19 pandemic | |
