= All the Good Girls Go to Hell =

2019 single by Billie Eilish

Single by Billie Eilish

from the album When We All Fall Asleep, Where Do We Go?
- Written: 2016–2018
- Released: September 6, 2019
- Genre: Electro
- Length: 2:48
- Label: Darkroom; Interscope
- Songwriters: Billie Eilish; Finneas O'Connell
- Producer: Finneas O'Connell

Billie Eilish singles chronology
"Bad Guy" (2019)	"All the Good Girls Go to Hell" (2019)	"Everything I Wanted" (2019)

Music video
- "All the Good Girls Go to Hell" on YouTube

"All the Good Girls Go to Hell" (stylised in lowercase) is a song by American singer-songwriter Billie Eilish and the sixth single from her debut studio album, When We All Fall Asleep, Where Do We Go? (2019). It was released on September 6, 2019, through Darkroom and Interscope Records. An electro track with pop influences, "All the Good Girls Go to Hell" sees Eilish sing about climate change. She wrote the song with its producer, Finneas O'Connell.

The song received generally favorable reviews from music critics, with many praising the lyrics and production. It entered at number 46 on the US Billboard Hot 100 and number 77 on the UK Singles Chart. Internationally, the song has peaked within the top five of four countries. The song has received several certifications, including being certified platinum in the United States by the Recording Industry Association of America (RIAA).

The accompanying music video was directed by Rich Lee and uploaded to Eilish's YouTube channel on September 4, 2019. It sees Eilish walk down a deserted road, completely covered in oil, as flames erupt around her. The video received positive reviews, with critics praising the visual's message about climate change. Eilish has promoted "All the Good Girls Go to Hell" by performing it live at festivals, including the Coachella Valley Music and Arts Festival (2019), and Glastonbury Festival (2019) as well as during Eilish's When We All Fall Asleep Tour (2019) and Where Do We Go? World Tour (2020) and Happier Than Ever, The World Tour (2022).

== Background and release ==
In an interview with Vulture, Eilish's brother Finneas O'Connell, known under his stage name of Finneas, said the song's lyrics are about climate change, God, and the Devil, as well as "the idea that humans have made such a mess of the planet at this point that they're both talking to each other like, 'What's going on? Why did they do all of this?'" Elaborating on this in an interview with MTV, Finneas said he and Eilish thought it would be fun to write a song from the perspective of the devil or god, who would be looking down at humans and be disappointed in them for destroying the Earth. He continued, saying them looking down is a consequence to humans for their actions. Eilish told Howard Stern during an interview on The Howard Stern Show that the chorus to "All the Good Girls Go to Hell" was written in 2016, while the rest was written and recorded in 2018.

Eilish shared an Instagram story on March 25, 2020, that featured a playlist of her inspirations for the track, saying "You Should See Me in a Crown", "My Strange Addiction", and "All the Good Girls Go to Hell" kind of "inspired themselves". In April 2020, during a 50-minute Verizon livestream, Eilish explained the meaning of "All the Good Girls Go to Hell": "The deeper meaning of the song is about global warming and climate strike and what's really important. This song is about the world and trying to save it, and people not believing that it needs to be saved."

"All the Good Girls Go to Hell" was written by Eilish and Finneas, with the latter handling production. The song was mastered by John Greenham and mixed by Rob Kinelski, both of whom also served as studio personnel. "All the Good Girls Go to Hell" was released on Eilish's debut studio album When We All Fall Asleep, Where Do We Go?, as the fifth track on March 29, 2019. The song was later released as the album's sixth single on September 6, 2019, accompanied by a music video release. Additionally, Universal Music Group sent it to Italian contemporary hit radio format the same day. In early October, the track impacted American alternative and mainstream radios. A flexi disc and cassette for the song were released via pre-order to ship in the following four-to-six weeks. The releases came with a digital single that was delivered to customers in the United States through email.

== Composition and lyrics ==
"All the Good Girls Go to Hell" was described as a "poppy" electro track by music critics. Neil Z. Young of AllMusic noted the song's "playful bass strum" that manages to "pull some G-funk effects into its orbit", while Robert Christgau of Vice magazine mentioned the song features "plinked piano". The staff of NME commented that "All The Good Girls Go To Hell" is "powered by bright pianos, off-the-wall synths and bass from Finneas in the second verse", and Jason Lipshutz of Billboard said Eilish's "stuttering words about death and desire lilt over the dripping beats of the propulsive". Chris Darville of Stereogum mentioned the song is "built around the oft-recycled notion that eternal damnation must be a much more interesting destination than boredom behind the pearly gates."

Lyrically, the song sees Eilish forsake heaven for hell: "My Lucifer is lonely." She mocks and walks away from heaven, saying: "Pearly gates [that] look more like a picket fence" and turning towards the dark side. Eilish also references Saint Peter, who is the keeper of the gates to heaven. "All the Good Girls Go to Hell" references Catholicism, with Eilish explaining that her degeneracies will go unpunished by the saints since "Peter's on vacation, an open invitation." Tanis Smither of Earmilk stated Eilish manages to "satirize both fame and the American dream as well as chastise adults twice and three times her age for climate change, noting that she quips: 'Man is such a fool, why are we saving him?'" The lyrics also make explicit reference to sea level rise and wildfires in California, both of which are linked to climate change.

== Critical reception ==
"All the Good Girls Go to Hell" has received mainly positive reviews from music critics. Madeline Roth of MTV described the song as a "jaunty, stuttering gem". Jon Pareles from The New York Times viewed the song as a "mocking, music-hall" track. Kenneth Womack of Salon magazine labeled the track as "playful". Christopher Thiessen from Consequence of Sound named "All the Good Girls Go to Hell" one of the essential tracks on When We All Fall Asleep, Where Do We Go? and called it a "banger". Roisin O'Connor, in his review for The Independent, had negative thoughts for the album's first four tracks, saying it "takes until track five – 'All the Good Girls Go to Hell' – for the album to gather any kind of momentum". In Clash, Yasmin Cowan described the song's title as "misleading" and "genius". musicOMH writer John Murphy stated that Eilish's track "Xanny" has an "appropriately narcotic haze [that] makes you yearn for the party anthems like 'All The Good Girls Go To Hell'". In 2020, The New York Times listed the song in their top 10 list of songs about climate change.

Writing for NME, Thomas Smith commended the song's chorus, saying it proves to be a "sparkling gem with jaunty piano and stuttering beats". David Opie of Highsnobiety wrote that "All the Good Girls Go to Hell" is "full of subversive lyrics that slither across the beat". Sean Ward, for The Line of Best Fit, compared the song to the Spice Girls "Say You'll Be There" (1996), and interpreted it as being a "haunted" version of the latter. He further noted Eilish's distorted vocals "whispering the ungodly hook of 'my Lucifer is lonely'" and that she "flips so effortlessly between religious metaphor and relationship disputes, using the two to enhance the track's overall narrative".

Insider's Libby Torres described it as an "absolute gem", saying that "Eilish's invitation to come and join her and her friends in hell sounds pretty damn appealing". Jules LeFevre, writing Junkee magazine, placed the song at number 16 on her Every Billie Eilish Song Ranked From Worst To Best list, saying the "dark Christian imagery fits Eilish's aesthetic like a black glove" while commenting that the song is "let down slightly by the lack of differentiation in rhythm and melody", leaving you "hoping that something would lift it off the ground, but it never happens".

== Commercial performance ==
Following the release of When We All Fall Asleep, Where Do We Go?, "All the Good Girls Go to Hell" debuted and peaked at number 46 on the US Billboard Hot 100. At the same time, Eilish broke the record of most simultaneous Hot 100 entries for a female artist. Following its release as a radio single, the song reached number 20 on the US Billboard Mainstream Top 40 chart and number 15 on the US Rock Airplay chart. It has been certified platinum by the Recording Industry Association of America (RIAA), denoting track-equivalent sales of 1,000,000 units in the US based on sales and streams.

On the Canadian Hot 100, "All the Good Girls Go to Hell" peaked at number 19, and it was certified platinum by Music Canada (MC) for shipments of over 80,000 copies in Canada. After its release as a single, the song peaked at number 77 on the UK Singles Chart. It was later certified platinum by the British Phonographic Industry (BPI) for selling over 600,000 units in the United Kingdom. "All the Good Girls Go to Hell" has peaked within the top 10 in Australia, Greece, and New Zealand. It has further peaked within the top five in Latvia, Lithuania, Slovakia, and Estonia. The song was ultimately certified gold by the Recorded Music NZ (RMNZ) for shipments of over 15,000 copies in New Zealand.

== Music video ==
=== Background ===
Eilish teased a music video for "All the Good Girls Go to Hell" with a clip of an image that said "haven't you been waiting long enough?" in September 2019. Her final teaser told people who were in New York to head to Times Square and check the screens at 4:00 pm. The music video was released through Eilish's YouTube channel the following day. It was directed by Rich Lee and filmed in Los Angeles, California. In an Instagram post, the video's stylist talked about the filming and how it was hard. She revealed that Eilish "suffered greatly for this beauty, hanging off a crane and dragging 25 foot long wings saturated in black slime weighing much more than her in agonizingly long takes". The stylist further added that Eilish thought of the concept and put in a lot of effort to fully understand it.

Elle Hunt of The Guardian noted that a closer inspection of the lyrics suggests that the song (and by extension, the music video) references global warming, and Eilish herself alluded to this by posting a personal note in the video description rallying her fans to attend global climate strikes on September 20 and 27, three days before the 2019 UN Climate Summit in New York City, while also asking them to support Greta Thunberg's climate strikes. Eilish said: "There are millions of people all over the world begging our leaders to pay attention. Our earth is warming up at an unprecedented rate, icecaps are melting, our oceans are rising, our wildlife is being poisoned and our forests are burning." In September 2020, Eilish announced an "All the Good Girls Go to Hell" figure that measured six inches tall, and was affixed with giant demon wings. Her website explained the figure was in "eco-friendly" packaging that also "transforms into a dioramic display".

=== Synopsis ===
Eilish walks down a deserted road, completely covered in oil, as flames erupt around her.

The music video picks up where "Bury a Friend" left off, opening with a shot of syringes being used to stab Eilish's back by a team of medical workers. She sprouts a pair of giant white wings from her back. When attempting to fly, Eilish falls down from the sky and lands on Earth into a huge oil spill, symbolizing the threat of wildlife being destroyed when humans pollute the environment. She gets stuck, with her white wings and eyes starting to fill with oil as she struggles to crawl out of the pit and break free from the oil. She barely manages to escape from the oil spill and emerges, with her entire body and white wings being now covered with the black oil. Eilish stares in disbelief at the world and starts to walk towards a dimly lit, deserted dirt road as her transformation continues. As Eilish continues to walk down the road, she begins to leave a trail of oil on the ground, which soon begins to catch on fire. Her now black wings also get set on fire. Eilish still continues to aimlessly stumble down the road and towards the camera. She frowns at the camera and turns around; her wings are now burnt and begin to twitch. The fire continues to spread throughout the area. Silhouettes of women dance in the fires around Eilish, representing people who don't care about global warming, as she walks alone into the night.

=== Reception ===
Uproxx's Derrick Rossignol wrote that the visual is "full of fire and darkness". Lauren Rearick, writing for Teen Vogue, said it "might just rival the trailer for It Chapter Two as the most terrifying thing we've laid eyes." Brittany Spanos of Rolling Stone described the visual as "fiery", while both Trey Alston of MTV and Carolyn Twersky of Seventeen called it "creepy". In his review for Alternative Press, Alex Darus viewed the video as "pretty trippy". Writing for Hot Press, Selina Juengling labeled it as "spooky", "dark", and "out of this world". Bustle's Marenah Dobin stated the video is "more than just a music video". Brock Thiessen of Exclaim! wrote that the visual is "incredibly dark". Elite Daily's Sade Spence called it "weird" and "eerie", while praising the music video as a "perfectly dark visual of the hellish lyrics that seem to talk about man's inability to act right". Katrina Nattress of iHeartRadio described the video as "nightmarish". The music video was nominated at the 2020 MTV Video Music Awards for the awards of Best Cinematography, Best Visual Affects, and Video For Good.

=== Credits and personnel ===
Credits adapted from Promonews.

==== Production companies ====
- Drive Studios – production company
- Exile Edit – post production company
- Sound Brigade – sound mix

==== Personnel ====
- Rich Lee – director
- Michael Angelos – producer
- Justin Diener – executive producer
- Michael Shores – post producer
- Christopher Probst – director of photography
- Brandon Mendez – production manager
- Dennis Ivarsson – gaffer
- Kaiyoti Pesante – key grip
- Christian Corio – set decorator
- Robbie Duncan – props
- Samantha Burkhart – stylist
- Tammy Yi – hair stylist
- Rob Rumsey – make-up stylist
- Hanny Eisen – makeup FX
- Ari Robbins – steadicam
- Rich Lee – VFX supervisor
- Louise Lee – VFX team member
- Anika Morris – VFX team member
- Jean Delauney – VFX team member
- Casey Benn – VFX team member
- Clark Jackson – VFX team member
- Sean Struble – VFX team member
- Ben Thronburgh – VFX team member
- Grant Surmi – editor
- Dustin Zimmerman – edit assistant
- Christopher Probst – colorist
- Jevon Dismuke – set dresser
- Lelan Berner – wing fabrication
- Brittani McNeal – contact lens tech
- Craig Rosales – water feature
- Rene Diamante – pyro
- Chris Moore – flame artist
- Chris deChristo – flame artist

== Live performances and other usage ==
To promote "All the Good Girls Go to Hell", Eilish performed it at the Coachella Valley Music and Arts Festival in April, at the Glastonbury Festival in June, and at Pukkelpop in August 2019. The song was included on the setlist of Eilish's 2019 When We All Fall Asleep Tour. In September 2019, Eilish and Finneas performed the song on The Howard Stern Show. She performed the song at the American Music Awards of 2019 on November 24, making her first ever award show performance. The singer started out seated, whispering the song's intro as Finneas played piano. Finneas later switched to playing bass guitar as Eilish jumped up and danced around the stage, against a background of flames. As the performance ended, Eilish stared into the camera and stuck her tongue out as the stage was devoured by flames. Eilish released an acoustic version of "All the Good Girls Go to Hell" as part of her live album Live at Third Man Records on December 6, 2019. In the same month, Eilish performed "All the Good Girls Go to Hell" at the Steve Jobs Theater for the first annual Apple Music Awards after she won artist of the year. The track was also included on the setlist of her 2020 Where Do We Go? World Tour. In April of that year, Eilish and Finneas performed the song during the 50-minute Verizon livestream. The song is used in the trailer for the 2019 film Saint Maud, and is featured in the 2020 rhythm game Just Dance 2021.

== Credits and personnel ==
Credits adapted from Tidal and the liner notes of When We All Fall Asleep, Where Do We Go?.

- Billie Eilish – vocals, songwriter
- Finneas O'Connell – bass, piano, drum programming, synthesizers, producer, songwriter
- John Greenham – mastering engineer, studio personnel
- Rob Kinelski – mixer, studio personnel
- Casey Cuayo – assistant mixer, studio personnel

== Charts ==
=== Weekly charts ===
Weekly chart performance for "All the Good Girls Go to Hell"
Chart (2019)	Peak position
Australia (ARIA)	8
Belgium (Ultratip Bubbling Under Flanders)	1
Belgium (Ultratip Bubbling Under Wallonia)	20
Canada Hot 100 (Billboard)	19
Czech Republic Airplay (ČNS IFPI)	11
Czech Republic Singles Digital (ČNS IFPI)	9
Denmark (Tracklisten)	29
Estonia (Eesti Tipp-40)	5
Finland (Suomen virallinen lista)	19
France (SNEP)	37
Germany (GfK)	63
Greece (IFPI)	6
Hungary (Single Top 40)	21
Hungary (Stream Top 40)	7
Iceland (Tónlistinn)	26
Ireland (IRMA)	52
Italy (FIMI)	70
Latvia (LAIPA)	4
Lithuania (AGATA)	3
Netherlands (Single Top 100)	42
New Zealand (Recorded Music NZ)	9
Norway (VG-lista)	22
Portugal (AFP)	22
Russia (Tophit)	55
Slovakia Singles Digital (ČNS IFPI)	5
Sweden (Sverigetopplistan)	25
UK Singles (Official Charts)	77
US Billboard Hot 100	46
US Pop Airplay (Billboard)	20
US Rock & Alternative Airplay (Billboard)	15

=== Year-end charts ===
2019 year-end chart positions for "All the Good Girls Go to Hell"
Chart (2019)	Position
Portugal (AFP)	190

2020 year-end chart positions for "All the Good Girls Go to Hell"
Chart (2020)	Position
US Rock Airplay (Billboard)	48

== Certifications ==
Certifications and sales for "All the Good Girls Go to Hell"
Region	Certification	Certified units/sales
Australia (ARIA)	2× Platinum	140,000^{‡}
Austria (IFPI Austria)	Platinum	30,000^{‡}
Brazil (Pro-Música Brasil)	Diamond	160,000^{‡}
Canada (Music Canada)	4× Platinum	320,000^{‡}
Denmark (IFPI Danmark)	Gold	45,000^{‡}
France (SNEP)	Gold	100,000^{‡}
Italy (FIMI)	Gold	35,000^{‡}
Mexico (AMPROFON)	Gold	30,000^{‡}
New Zealand (RMNZ)	Platinum	30,000^{‡}
Poland (ZPAV)	Platinum	20,000^{‡}
Portugal (AFP)	Platinum	10,000^{‡}
Spain (Promusicae)	Gold	30,000^{‡}
United Kingdom (BPI)	Platinum	600,000^{‡}
United States (RIAA)	Platinum	1,000,000^{‡}
^{‡} Sales+streaming figures based on certification alone.

== Release history ==
Release dates and formats for "All the Good Girls Go to Hell"
Region	Date	Format(s)	Version	Label(s)	Ref.
Italy	September 6, 2019	Radio airplay	Original	Universal	
United States	October 1, 2019	Alternative radio	Original	Darkroom; Interscope	
United States	October 2, 2019	Contemporary hit radio; digital download	Various (Note: Two versions of the song were released through All Access, dubbed as "Edit/Hook Intro" and "Edit/No Hook Intro")	Darkroom; Interscope	
United States	October 8, 2019	Contemporary hit radio	Original	Darkroom; Interscope	
United States	November 6, 2019	Cassette; digital download; flexi disc	Original	Darkroom; Interscope	
