= Wish You Were Gay =

2019 single by Billie Eilish

Single by Billie Eilish

from the album When We All Fall Asleep, Where Do We Go?
- Written: c. 2015–2016
- Released: March 4, 2019
- Genre: Classic pop
- Length: 3:41
- Label: Darkroom; Interscope
- Songwriters: Billie Eilish; Finneas O'Connell
- Producer: Finneas

Billie Eilish singles chronology
"Bury a Friend" (2019)	"Wish You Were Gay" (2019)	"Bad Guy" (2019)

Audio
- "Wish You Were Gay" on YouTube

"Wish You Were Gay" (stylised in all lowercase) is a song by American singer-songwriter Billie Eilish and the fourth single from her debut studio album, When We All Fall Asleep, Where Do We Go? (2019). It was released on March 4, 2019, through Darkroom and Interscope Records. Eilish wrote "Wish You Were Gay" with its producer, her brother Finneas O'Connell, when she was 14 years old. A classic pop song, it incorporates an acoustic guitar, a sound of cracking knuckles as percussion, canned laughter, and applause from an audience. In the lyrics, she seeks a reason for why a male love interest does not like her back; she hopes that he may be attracted only to men.

Music critics had mixed opinions about its themes. Some liked its relatability and honesty, and others deemed it insensitive. It received backlash from some of Eilish's fans, who interpreted the title and lyrics as an act of queerbaiting. In response, she stated the lyrics were not intended to be offensive to the queer community. About the production, some critics appreciated what they deemed an unconventional yet catchy composition, while some thought that "Wish You Were Gay" took an unsuccessful risk sonically.

The song's commercial performance helped to propel Eilish to mainstream fame. It peaked at number 31 on the US Billboard Hot 100, and it reached the top 5 of singles charts in Australia, Latvia, Lithuania, and New Zealand. Among its many certifications are a platinum one from the Recording Industry Association of America and a triple-platinum one from the Australian Recording Industry Association. Throughout 2019, Eilish performed "Wish You Were Gay" in two concerts and three music festivals. She embarked on two world tours in support of When We All Fall Asleep, Where Do We Go?—one in 2019 and another in 2020—the set lists for which featured the song.

== Background and release ==
Billie Eilish wrote "Wish You Were Gay" when she was 14 years old, about a boy in whom she took a romantic interest. (Note: Eilish was born in December 2001, making her 14 years old from 2015 to 2016.) She introduced the song and previewed a demo of it to her fans through her Instagram account in July 2018. Eilish explained that the boy did not reciprocate her feelings; she felt distraught that he did not love her back. Seeking a rationale for his disinterest in her, she hoped that he was attracted only to men: "[The song] literally means I wish he was gay so that he didn't like me for an actual reason, instead of the fact that he didn't like me." Some time after songwriting, the boy approached Eilish and came out to her as gay. About the situation, she commented that she "wrote the song and made him fuck a dude. I'm fucking proud bro except not really though because I was really into him, like so into him, he's so hot oh my god." She stated that the lyrics were not meant to be offensive to the queer community.

"Wish You Were Gay" was released as the fourth single from Eilish's debut studio album, When We All Fall Asleep, Where Do We Go? (2019), on March 4, 2019. Eilish announced in a press release that for the next 48 hours, a portion of proceeds from her online merchandise store would go to the Trevor Project, a crisis and suicide prevention program for queer children. A supplementary YouTube video accompanied the release, in which Eilish and the song's producer, her brother Finneas O'Connell, broke down the inspiration behind "Wish You Were Gay". She explained: "This was a situation where I was fucking all for this kid, like oh my god. It was the kind of love where everything was thrown out there and nothing was latched onto." The next year, on March 25, Eilish posted to Instagram about the songs that inspired each track from the album. For "Wish You Were Gay", she said that she was inspired by "Body Count" by Jessie Reyez, "Eres Tú" by Carla Morrison, and "Boy" by Anne-Marie.

== Music and lyrics ==
Music critics classified "Wish You Were Gay" as a pop or classic pop song with influences of jazz music. With a runtime of 3 minutes and 41 seconds, it begins with Eilish's voice over acoustic guitar chords. Later, a rhythm consisting of cracking knuckles appears. Canned laughter and the sound of shouting children play as reactions to some lines she sings. "Wish You Were Gay" closes with a sample of a round of applause; Jon Pareles from The New York Times considered the song's inclusion of an audience an attempt at highlighting its theatrical elements. During an interview with MTV, Finneas shared that he wanted its production to go a "bombastic, triumphant place". He hoped that by using clapping and stomping noises to create a heavy beat, he was able to give it an "exciting" climax. About the laugh track, he remarked: "I don't really have a justification for that. I just thought it would be cool [...] There's something weird about it."

The song centers on Eilish's frustration around her unreciprocated love for a boy, and she sings about how he often ignores her when she tries to interact. To provide herself a reason for his disinterest, she hopes that he lacks any attraction not just for her, but for all girls. She takes a facetious, self-centered tone in the lyrics; to her, any other reason for her unrequited feelings wounds her ego, so she resorts to an explanation that is easier to accept. Eilish makes jokes about her heartbreak to cope with the situation. She summarized "Wish You Were Gay" in an interview with radio personality Zane Lowe: "it's a selfish song. It's a goofy, selfish joke, you know?" Rob Haskell of Vogue analyzed that by singing "I can't tell you how much I wish I didn't wanna stay", Eilish attempts to maintain an impression of ambivalence about her lack of reciprocation through a double negative. The lyrics incorporate a countdown, shown in lines such as "if three's a crowd and two was us, one slipped away".

== Reception ==
Some music critics praised "Wish You Were Gay" for what they deemed an unconventional yet catchy production, such as Chloe Gilke of Uproxx, who compared it positively to Eilish's previous works. She commended how Eilish and Finneas used "unexpected vocal flourishes and offbeat sounds" to create, in her view, an "immaculate" tune. Meanwhile, a few considered its production risky but found the risk unsuccessful, saying it caused the album to "stumble" midway through its runtime. Pitchfork's Stacey Anderson favored Eilish's vocals, and journalist Robert Christgau shared similar opinions, calling her voice "tunefully cooed". However, Anderson was less positive about the use of a laugh track and self-centered lyrics.

The song received backlash for its lyrics related to homosexual attraction. Some of Eilish's fans—many of whom were queer—expected her to release a gay anthem or come out as being attracted to women based on the title. Once they found out what "Wish You Were Gay" was about, they criticized it for what they perceived as queerbaiting, which is an act of hinting at the possibility of a same-gender romance but never depicting it explicitly to draw attention. (Note: Referenced by multiple sources:) A number of fans were mad at Eilish's remark about making the song's subject "fuck a dude". Others suggested that she was objectifying gay men, while some said that critics were misinterpreting "Wish You Were Gay" or should not have expected it to be for the queer community. Eilish responded to the criticisms, clarifying the meaning of the song and stating that detractors might have missed the point of the lyrics. She reiterated that she sought to portray herself as a "selfish ass" and write as inoffensively as possible, but she expressed understanding that to use the word "gay" in such a manner was insensitive. She also commented that listeners could still interpret "Wish You Were Gay" from a queer character's perspective. Eilish cited how a female friend who was attracted to women liked the song because she felt the lyrics resonated with her experiences with same-gender attraction.

Music critics' reactions to the lyrics were mixed. Many appreciated its relatability in spite of childish or problematic undertones some thought were present within it. (Note: Reviews that share such an opinion include the following:) Sean Ward for The Line of Best Fit wrote that the song "may be problematic in its desire to change someone's sexual orientation, yet the burning teenage frustrations of unrequited lust are captured exceptionally here". Some were positive about the honest and humorous way Eilish handled her situation; one praised the countdown incorporated in the lyrics as clever. On the other hand, Vulture's Craig Jenkins was unimpressed with the song, of the opinion that Eilish had a "silly" way of dealing with her rejection. A few staff members for Atwood Magazine criticized its central theme as insensitive. One of them acknowledged that Eilish meant no offense with "Wish You Were Gay" but argued that if she knew that homosexuality was a sensitive topic to discuss, she should have thought twice about writing lyrics that could be interpreted as trivializing gay life. The Atlantic's Spencer Kornhaber countered arguments to this effect. He wrote in a review of When We All Fall Asleep, Where Do We Go: "Eilish isn't shading a guy’s effeminacy; she's just treating sexuality as no big deal by wishing that he had an ulterior motive for rejecting her."

== Commercial performance ==
"Wish You Were Gay" helped to propel Eilish to mainstream success; in 2021, Billboard ranked it as her 10th biggest song on the US Billboard Hot 100 chart. The song debuted on the chart at number 74, and it climbed to number 59 the next week, making it Eilish's third song to reach the chart's top 60. On April 13, 2019, 14 of Eilish's songs were on the Billboard Hot 100—"Wish You Were Gay" was one of them. This broke the record for the most simultaneous Billboard Hot 100 entries by a woman, until Taylor Swift took the record with all 18 tracks from Lover (2019). "Wish You Were Gay" reached its chart peak that day at number 31. By May, the song acquired over 175 million streams on Spotify. "Wish You Were Gay" is certified platinum by the Recording Industry Association of America (RIAA), denoting track-equivalent sales of 1,000,000 units in the US based on sales and streams.

When We All Fall Asleep, Where Do We Go? was released on March 29, 2019. After the album's release, during the start of April 2019, "Wish You Were Gay" jumped from number 42 to its peak of number 13 in the UK Singles Chart. It joined other album tracks "Bad Guy" and "Bury a Friend" in the top 20. In the Irish Singles Chart, where the three songs reached the top 10, "Wish You Were Gay" climbed to a new, all-time peak of number 6. By mid-April, the three were also in the top 10 of the singles chart published by the Australian Recording Industry Association (ARIA). "Wish You Were Gay" placed at number 9 during that time, and it eventually peaked at number 5 in the chart. The song reached the top 20 in Austria, Canada, the Czech Republic, Finland, France, Latvia, Lithuania, Malaysia, New Zealand, Norway, Portugal, Singapore, and Sweden.

== Live performances ==
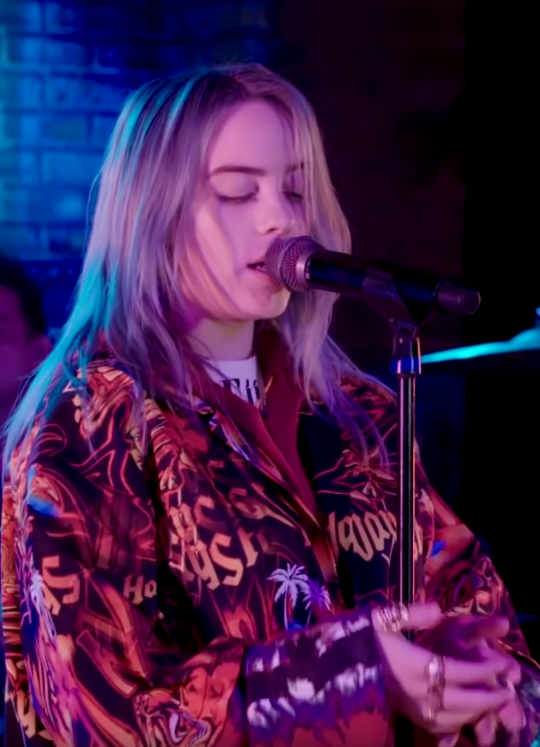
Eilish performing "Wish You Were Gay" for MTV in 2019

Less than 24 hours after its release, Eilish performed "Wish You Were Gay" alongside other songs from her debut extended play, Don't Smile at Me (2017). She shared a video of the performance to YouTube around a month later, on April 30. Eilish also sang "Wish You Were Gay" in a concert she hosted in the Greek Theatre of Los Angeles on July 12, 2019. The song was in the set lists of tours in support of When We All Fall Asleep, Where Do We Go?: one in 2019 and another in 2020.

During 2019, Eilish performed "Wish You Were Gay" at three music festivals: Coachella in April, Glastonbury in June, and Pukkelpop in August. She performed the song for BBC Radio 1 at Maida Vale Studios, London. During a show for MTV Push, Eilish sang it alongside two other tracks from When We All Fall Asleep, Where Do We Go?, "Xanny" and "When the Party's Over". "Wish You Were Gay" was one of many songs that Eilish played after receiving Artist of the Year during the first annual Apple Music Awards in December 2019.

== Credits and personnel ==
Credits adapted from Tidal.

- Billie Eilish – vocals, songwriting
- Finneas O'Connell – songwriting, production
- Rob Kinelski – mixing
- John Greenham – mastering
- Casey Cuayo – assistant mixing

== Charts ==
=== Weekly charts ===
Weekly chart performance for "Wish You Were Gay"
Chart (2019–2020)	Peak position
Australia (ARIA)	5
Austria (Ö3 Austria Top 40)	16
Belgium (Ultratop 50 Flanders)	45
Belgium (Ultratip Bubbling Under Wallonia)	7
Canada Hot 100 (Billboard)	12
Czech Republic Singles Digital (ČNS IFPI)	6
Denmark (Tracklisten)	12
Estonia (Eesti Tipp-40)	3
Finland (Suomen virallinen lista)	16
France (SNEP)	20
Germany (GfK)	52
Greece (IFPI)	4
Hungary (Single Top 40)	34
Hungary (Stream Top 40)	5
Iceland (Tónlistinn)	12
Ireland (IRMA)	6
Italy (FIMI)	69
Latvia (LAIPA)	2
Lithuania (AGATA)	2
Malaysia (RIM)	13
Netherlands (Single Top 100)	35
New Zealand (Recorded Music NZ)	2
Norway (VG-lista)	14
Portugal (AFP)	13
Scottish Singles Sales (Official Charts)	62
Singapore (RIAS)	18
Slovakia Singles Digital (ČNS IFPI)	3
South Korea (Gaon)	162
Spain (Promusicae)	54
Sweden (Sverigetopplistan)	13
Switzerland (Schweizer Hitparade)	46
UK Singles (Official Charts)	23
US Billboard Hot 100	31

=== Year-end charts ===
Year-end chart performance for "Wish You Were Gay"
Chart (2019)	Position
Australia (ARIA)	79
Hungary (Stream Top 40)	72
Iceland (Tónlistinn)	73
Latvia (LAIPA)	73
New Zealand (Recorded Music NZ)	45
Portugal (AFP)	134

== Certifications ==
Certifications and sales for "Wish You Were Gay"
Region	Certification	Certified units/sales
Australia (ARIA)	3× Platinum	210,000^{‡}
Austria (IFPI Austria)	Platinum	30,000^{‡}
Brazil (Pro-Música Brasil)	Diamond	160,000^{‡}
Canada (Music Canada)	3× Platinum	240,000^{‡}
Denmark (IFPI Danmark)	Platinum	90,000^{‡}
Italy (FIMI)	Gold	35,000^{‡}
Mexico (AMPROFON)	Diamond+Gold	330,000^{‡}
New Zealand (RMNZ)	3× Platinum	90,000^{‡}
Norway (IFPI Norway)	Gold	30,000^{‡}
Poland (ZPAV)	Platinum	20,000^{‡}
Portugal (AFP)	Platinum	10,000^{‡}
Spain (Promusicae)	Gold	30,000^{‡}
United Kingdom (BPI)	Platinum	600,000^{‡}
United States (RIAA)	Platinum	1,000,000^{‡}
Streaming
Sweden (GLF)	Gold	6,000,000^{†}
^{‡} Sales+streaming figures based on certification alone.^{†} Streaming-only figures based on certification alone.
