= When We All Fall Asleep, Where Do We Go? =

2019 studio album by Billie Eilish

Studio album by Billie Eilish
- Released: March 29, 2019
- Recorded: February 2018 – January 2019
- Studios: O'Connell's home studio (Los Angeles, California)
- Genres: Electropop; avant-pop; alt-pop; art pop
- Length: 42:56
- Labels: Darkroom; Interscope
- Producer: Finneas O'Connell

Billie Eilish chronology
Don't Smile at Me (2017)	When We All Fall Asleep, Where Do We Go? (2019)	Live at Third Man Records (2019)

Singles from When We All Fall Asleep, Where Do We Go?
- 1. "You Should See Me in a Crown" Released: July 18, 2018; 2. "When the Party's Over" Released: October 17, 2018; 3. "Bury a Friend" Released: January 30, 2019; 4. "Wish You Were Gay" Released: March 4, 2019; 5. "Bad Guy" Released: March 29, 2019; 6. "All the Good Girls Go to Hell" Released: September 6, 2019; 7. "Ilomilo" Released: April 10, 2020

When We All Fall Asleep, Where Do We Go? (stylized in all caps) is the debut studio album by American singer-songwriter Billie Eilish. It was released on March 29, 2019, by Darkroom and Interscope Records in the US and Polydor Records in the UK. Eilish, aged 17 at the time of release, largely wrote the album with her brother, Finneas O'Connell, who produced it at his small bedroom studio in Highland Park, Los Angeles.

Musically, When We All Fall Asleep, Where Do We Go? is an electropop, avant-pop, alt-pop, and art pop record, though it also features influences from hip-hop and industrial music. Its songs explore themes such as modern youth, drug addiction, heartbreak, suicide, and mental health, with lyrical sensibilities of humor and horror. The album's title comes from a line in the song "Bury a Friend". Eilish said the album was inspired in part by lucid dreaming and night terrors, which are reflected on the cover photo.

The album was marketed with the release of seven singles, four of which received multi-platinum certifications in the US: "You Should See Me in a Crown", "When the Party's Over", "Bury a Friend", and the worldwide hit "Bad Guy". Eilish also embarked on several tours in support of the album, including the When We All Fall Asleep Tour and the Where Do We Go? World Tour. An immediate commercial success, the album topped record charts in many countries during its first week of release. By June 2019, it had sold more than 1.3 million copies in the US and became the year's best-selling album in Canada, while in the UK, it had made Eilish the youngest female solo act to chart at number one.

Upon release, When We All Fall Asleep, Where Do We Go? received universal acclaim and was one of the year's most acclaimed albums. Many reviewers praised its subject matter, songwriting, cohesiveness, and Eilish's vocal styling. At the 62nd Annual Grammy Awards, it won Album of the Year, Best Pop Vocal Album, and Best Engineered Album, Non-Classical, while "Bad Guy" won Record of the Year and Song of the Year; O'Connell also won the award for Producer of the Year, Non-Classical, while Eilish also won the award for Best New Artist. This made Eilish the first woman and second artist ever, after Christopher Cross, to win all four General Field categories in one ceremony. Eilish became the first person born in the 21st century to win a Grammy Award.

== Writing and recording ==
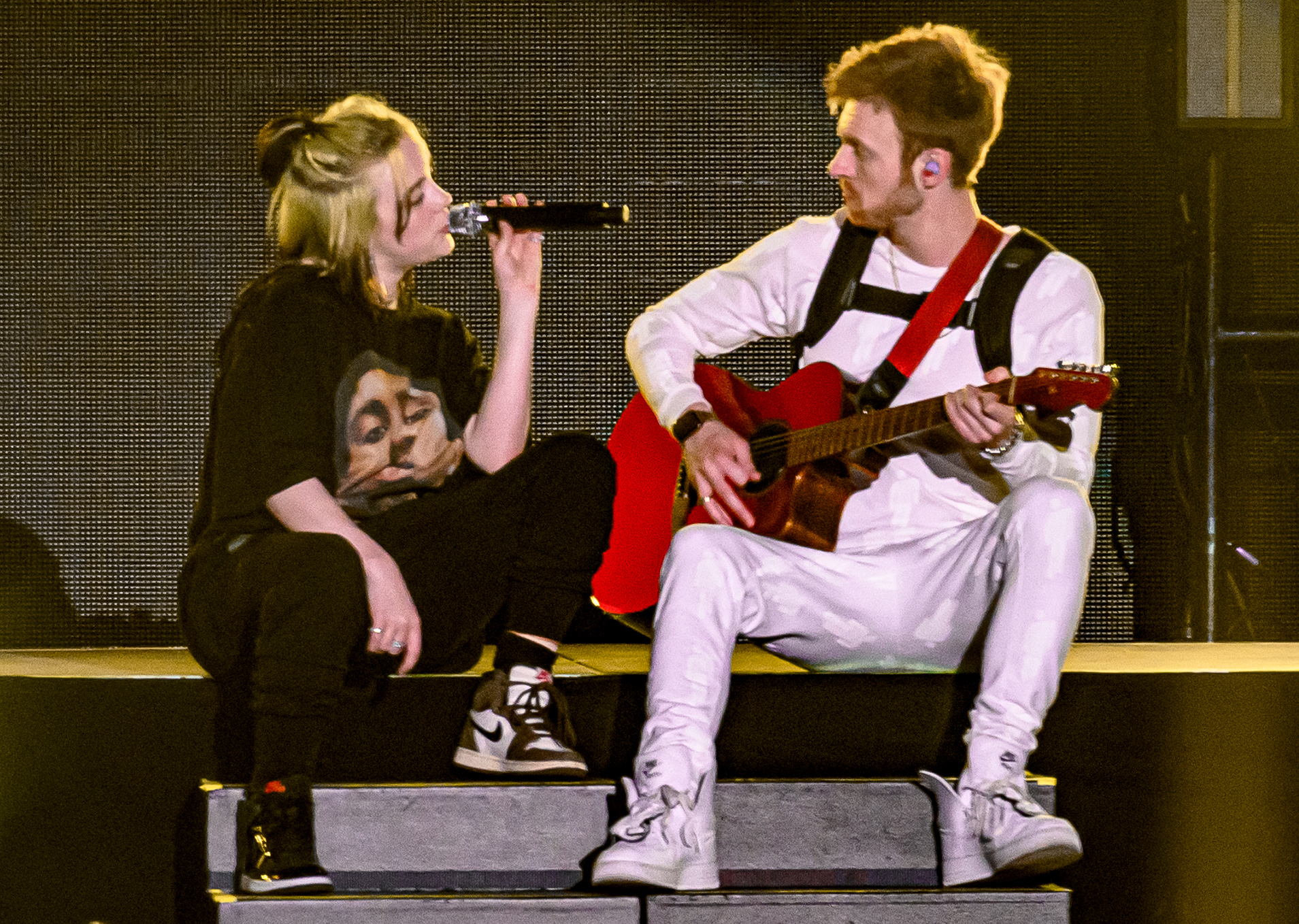
Billie Eilish in 2020 with her brother, Finneas O'Connell, who produced and co-wrote the album

Billie Eilish and her brother, Finneas O'Connell, began working on When We All Fall Asleep, Where Do We Go? in May 2016 with the track "Listen Before I Go", but re-recorded the song two years later in spring 2018. Eilish intended the album to contain material "that's so fun to be in the moment at a show to" as well as "shit that's crazy and also depressing". She further wished to "do everything in this album" due to her hatred for genre restrictions.

The album was recorded in O'Connell's small bedroom studio in Highland Park, California, using production material including Logic Pro X, a Universal Audio Apollo 8 interface, and a pair of Yamaha HS5 studio monitors with an H8S subwoofer. The pair explained that they chose this recording location rather than a professional studio due to the bedroom's intimate and homely nature as well as the manner in which the bedroom affects vocals, while criticizing an external studio's lack of natural light and high cost of use. Despite the independence of the writing process, they were nonetheless subject to deadlines and meetings with Eilish's label, Darkroom/Interscope; she later stated that she "hated every second" of the album's creation. Audio mixing was handled by Rob Kinelski, who had mixed all of Eilish's work thus far. In an interview with Billboard, Kinelski disclosed that O'Connell would send him "really nice stems" for separate instruments during the process.

On March 20, 2018, Eilish confirmed that she was working on an album and estimated that it would be released towards the end of the year. In July 2018, during an interview with BBC Radio 1, she announced that the album was expected to be out on March 29, 2019. The album was mastered and finished in January 2019.

== Composition ==
=== Musical style ===
The album is built around O'Connell's production which frequently incorporates amplified bass, minimalist percussion, and additional foley and acoustic sounds. While the song structures on the record are traditional in construction, made of formal melodies accompanied with keyboard, guitar or bass instrumentation, it further incorporates harsh, industrial influences, prompting Jon Caramanica of The New York Times to describe Eilish as "the first SoundCloud-rap pop star, without the rapping". Chris Willman of Variety also noted the album's usage of dissonance and distortion, commenting that, "With all its moments of distortion and attitude, tempered by sheer loveliness, and rude and emotional songs about night terrors and daydreams, When We All Fall Asleep, Where Do We Go? feels like a rock 'n' roll album, even if there's virtually nothing on it that sounds like rock music." Elsewhere, critics have highlighted indie electronic, pop, EDM, dance-pop, synth-pop, R&B, trap, and jazz influences. The record has been noted for its minimalist and hip-hop-inspired production, leading to comparisons to Lorde's debut album Pure Heroine, which was largely the aim of the siblings, as they found that adding additional musical features often makes a song sound "way worse".

Because Eilish draws on a variety of genres, Yasmin Cowan of Clash opined that "to confine [her] to any specific brand of music would be doing her craft a disservice", although other reviewers have characterized When We All Fall Asleep as a genre-hopping pop record incorporating the styles of electropop, avant-pop, alternative pop, and art pop. Robert Christgau described it as "electro-saturated", and Chris Riemenschneider from the Star Tribune called it "jaggedly rhythmic, candidly intimate stream-of-consciousness electro-pop", while Rolling Stone writer Suzy Exposito found it "full of dressed-down avant-pop with D.I.Y. immediacy and intimacy" yet still comparable to the maximalist pop of Eilish's contemporaries Ariana Grande and Halsey. According to Amanda Petrusich from The New Yorker, Eilish's "spare, portentous" style of electropop "recalls the work of Trent Reznor, but is imbued with far more friskiness, conviviality, and youthful nonchalance". In Tom Hull's opinion, the album's electropop songs have a quality of catchiness but feature unobtrusive hooks.

=== Lyrics and vocals ===
Lyrically, the album deals with the hopes and fears of contemporary youth, touching on themes of drug addiction, heartbreak, climate change, mental health, and suicide. In an interview with Zane Lowe, Eilish explained that the album was largely inspired by lucid dreaming and night terrors, revealing that it "is basically what happens when you fall asleep", hence its title, and stated at an earlier interview that it "is basically supposed to be a bad dream, or a good dream". i-D writer Jack Hall noted that to deal with the record's serious subject matter in a less portentous manner, Eilish writes with humor and horror in a manner similar to memes. Despite this, it is unclear whether the experiences found in the lyrics are her own, since she often distances herself from the content of her songs. The singer explained to Rolling Stone that she and her brother "like writing from other people's perspectives", elaborating that half of the songs on the album "are fictional and half are things [she] was going through, and no one will ever know which is which". In 2021, Eilish stated that the album was "almost all fictional".

Eilish's vocal style on When We All Fall Asleep has frequently been described as soft and whispered by music critics. Neil McCormick of The Daily Telegraph stated that the singer's tone "can shift from coquettish to threatening, playfully ironic to emotionally sincere in a breath", adding that her "close-to-the-mic singing is enhanced by layers of ethereal harmonies without swamping a sense of intimacy". It has further been likened to ASMR; while some reviewers simply stated that her voice reminded them of the sensation, others stated that they experienced "tingles" listening to Eillish's vocals, with Helen Holmes of Observer citing the singer's "little giggles and intonations, and the way her intonation 'falls off' at the end of sentences" as the reasons.

=== Songs ===
The album's opening track, "!!!!!!!", is a short intro in which Eilish slurps saliva from her Invisalign aligners and announces that "this is the album", before she and her brother descend into laughter. O'Connell explained that it served to "find a sense of humor" amidst the "heaviness" of the album. The following track, "Bad Guy", is a pop-trap song which uses a bass, a kick-drum, and amplified finger snaps in its production. The song's lyrics feature Eilish taunting her partner, while suggesting that she is the "bad guy" rather than him. Eilish was inspired to write "Xanny" after attending a party at which her friends "kept throwing up, kept drinking more", consequently becoming "completely not who they were". While recording the song, Eilish and her brother created a sound inspired by a girl blowing cigarette smoke in the former's face alongside a drum kit and a jazz-inspired loop to replicate the feeling of being "in secondhand smoke".

"You Should See Me in a Crown", which the two siblings wrote after watching the third episode of the second season of BBC television series Sherlock titled "The Reichenbach Fall", is a trap-influenced electropop song which features Eilish singing over "blaring synths and rapid-fire hi-hats". "All the Good Girls Go to Hell" was described by Stereogum as a "punchy piano number" and one of the album's "poppiest tracks", and explores the idea that God and the Devil are both "looking at human beings as this kind of meek group of people and just being like, 'What are they trying to do here?'" The following track, "Wish You Were Gay", is a jazzy classic pop song where Eilish sings of her wish that a man she likes is gay to explain his lack of romantic interest in her. The seventh song on the album, "When the Party's Over", is a piano ballad with choral influences, and was written after O'Connell had left his date's house "kind of for no reason".

The eighth track, titled "8", is a ukulele-based lullaby which manipulates Eilish's vocals to make her sound like a small child. The following song, "My Strange Addiction", is a bass-heavy pop song which samples audio from an episode of the American television sitcom The Office titled "Threat Level Midnight". To include the samples, Eilish needed the approval of Steve Carell, B. J. Novak, John Krasinski, and Mindy Kaling, the members of the episode's cast featured in the audio, which they all personally granted. The next track, "Bury a Friend", has been described as a minimalist electronica and industrial song, and musically features a beat reminiscent of "Black Skinhead" by Kanye West, a vocal line similar to "People Are Strange" by the Doors, and scattered synth melodies. It is written from the perspective of a monster under a bed, exploring what "this creature [is] doing or feeling", with lyrics from which the album title originates. The song's beat segues into the eleventh track "Ilomilo", an electropop cut named after the 2010 video game, to give the album further cohesion.

The final three tracks have titles that form a sentence: "Listen Before I Go, I Love You, Goodbye". In an interview with Vulture, O'Connell stated that his sister "liked the readability of that" before adding that "they are [related]" since they are "different sentiments about a farewell". The three songs are placed at the end of the album to avoid an abrupt ending. "Listen Before I Go" is an ambient song that features a gentle piano accompaniment and jazz influences while Eilish sings from the perspective of someone about to commit suicide, with faint street noises and sirens added at the beginning and end of the track for ambience. The following track, "I Love You", is similar in aesthetic and uses a sample of an airline attendant talking and a plane taking off. O'Connell has described the song as being about how "it sucks to be in love sometimes", while its chorus has drawn comparisons to Leonard Cohen's "Hallelujah", which have pleased the songwriter. The final song, "Goodbye", features a line of each of the album's tracks (with the exception of "!!!!!!!") in its lyrics in reverse order compared with how they appear in the album, beginning with a line from "I Love You" and ending with a line from "Bad Guy", with clips from these songs layered quietly in reverse as a motif representing when "you grow up listening to a tape and at the end, you reverse the tape to go back to the beginning of the song".

== Release and promotion ==
=== Distribution and artwork ===
When We All Fall Asleep, Where Do We Go? was released on March 29, 2019. To celebrate the release, Eilish launched an immersive experience in partnership with Spotify, featuring several rooms that each symbolize a song from the album, with objects to smell, hear, and feel, reflecting the singer's synesthesia.

The cover artwork was photographed by Kenneth Cappello, who also photographed the artwork for Eilish's 2017 EP Don't Smile at Me. After working with Eilish on pictures for her. magazine, Cappello was asked to photograph the artwork for her upcoming album. The shoot took place on Eilish's birthday in December at a studio in Los Angeles and lasted 12 hours. The singer had prepared sketches for the album cover which were inspired by the album's themes of night terrors and lucid dreaming, as well as Eilish's interest in horror films, specifically The Babadook. Cappello told MTV News that he "knew she wanted it moody". For it to "feel real", Cappello added no additional lighting to the end photo to give the impression that "a door was opening and that was the light coming into the bedroom". He additionally shot different variations of Eilish sitting on the bed expressing a range of emotions. Eilish wore contacts to fill in her eyes completely with white. She further wished to use a minimum of additional special effects and touch-ups on the end product to retain a sense of "realness and transparency".

=== Marketing and singles ===
In 2018, Eilish released several singles, including "You Should See Me in a Crown" and "When the Party's Over", which would appear on the album. On January 29, 2019, the singer teased her debut album on social media for the first time, revealing its artwork and title. She also announced the release of a new single for the following day at 9 am PT, which was revealed to be "Bury a Friend", alongside a music video and the album's track listing; the song became a hit for Eilish.

On March 3, Eilish posted a snippet of an upcoming single named "Wish You Were Gay" in an Instagram post, alongside an announcement revealing its release as the album's fourth single the following day at 9 am PT. A live video for the track recorded at a show in London that month was shared at the end of April. On March 16, Eilish performed as a headliner at the South by Southwest festival, singing fourteen songs including the four singles from When We All Fall Asleep, accompanied by "elaborate videos" on a rear-end screen. Her performance was well received by critics.

The fifth single, "Bad Guy", was released in tandem with the album on March 29, 2019, accompanied by a music video. The song became a worldwide hit and among the four singles from the album to be certified multi-platinum in the US, along with "You Should See Me in a Crown", "When the Party's Over", and "Bury a Friend". "Wish You Were Gay" and "All the Good Girls Go to Hell", released on August 30 as the sixth single, were also certified platinum. "Ilomilo" was released as the seventh single on May 26, 2020.

=== Touring ===
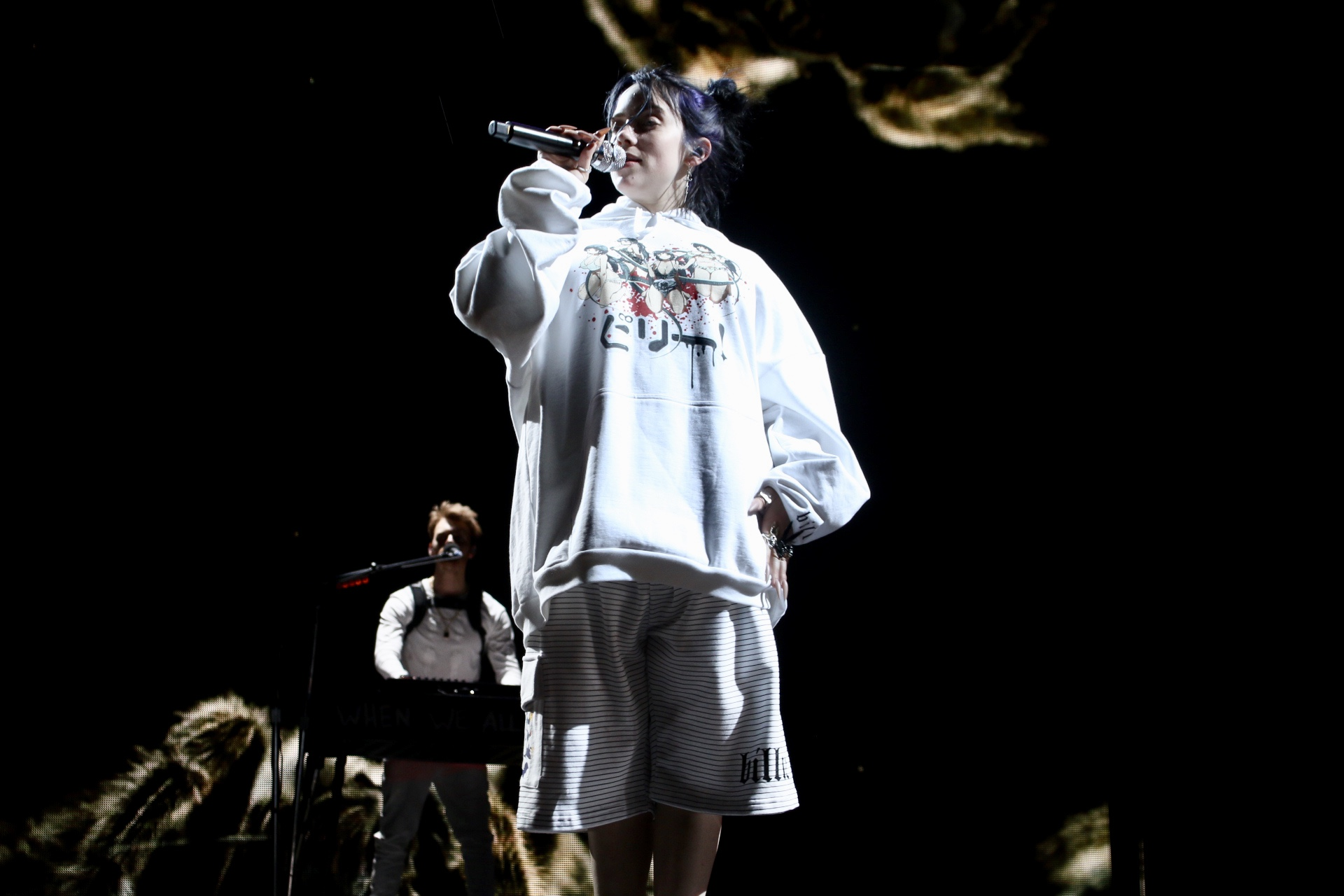
Eilish performing at the Red Rocks Amphitheatre in May 2019

Eilish embarked on two-month tour of Europe, beginning on February 11, 2019, at Kesselhaus, part of Kulturbrauerei in Berlin, where she performed "Bury a Friend" and "When I Was Older" for the first time in concert. The tour lasted through March 6 and included dates at Glasgow's SWG3 arena, Manchester Academy, the O_{2} Institute in Birmingham, and Shepherd's Bush Empire in London. It was later announced that she would perform a set of intimate acoustic shows at the Pryzm club in London on March 7.

Eilish also supported the album with the When We All Fall Asleep Tour, which was announced in February 2019. It began in April of that year with two performances at Coachella, the first of which was universally praised by critics, some of whom hailed it as the highlight of the day despite technical difficulties regarding Vince Staples's microphone during his verse on the track "&Burn". A second tour, the Where Do We Go? World Tour, was announced in September 2019. It began in March 2020 and was planned to conclude in September of that year, with plans to tour South America, Europe, and Asia in addition to North America. Due to the COVID-19 pandemic, the tour ended three days after the first show, with only three shows played in total.

Eilish also appeared at the Groovin' the Moo festival, which took place throughout the end of April and beginning of May. Eilish was also part of the line-up of BBC Radio 1's Big Weekend on May 25 in Middlesbrough. At the Glastonbury Festival on June 30, Eilish appeared on the "Other Stage" as a warm up for British rapper Dave, backed only by her brother on keyboards, a drummer, and a plain, black stage. Her slot received widespread critical acclaim, with reviewers citing her engagement with the audience and versatile performance as reasons for their praise.

== Critical reception ==
Professional ratings
Aggregate scores
Source	Rating
AnyDecentMusic?	7.5/10
Metacritic	82/100
Review scores
Source	Rating
AllMusic	4/5 stars
The Daily Telegraph	4/5 stars
The Guardian	4/5 stars
The Irish Times	4/5 stars
NME	5/5 stars
Pitchfork	7.2/10
Q	4/5 stars
Rolling Stone	3.5/5 stars
The Times	4/5 stars
Vice (Expert Witness)	A

When We All Fall Asleep, Where Do We Go? was met with widespread acclaim, with several critics praising its macabre subject matter, cohesiveness, and Eilish and O'Connell's songwriting abilities. At Metacritic, which assigns a normalized rating out of 100 to reviews from professional critics, the album has an average score of 82, based on 21 reviews. Aggregator AnyDecentMusic? gave it 7.5 out of 10, based on their assessment of the critical consensus.

Reviewing for The Daily Telegraph, Neil McCormick praised the album's lyrical content and wide range of musical influences, writing that "it sounds modern and old fashioned at the same time". NME reviewer Thomas Smith opined that it "ticks all the boxes for a memorable and game-changing debut album" and applauded its fun and original qualities. Matt Bobkin of Exclaim! remarked that the record displayed "a bold artistic vision and a willingness to move beyond the boundaries of pop conventions" and praised O'Connell's production as "meticulous". Writing for Pitchfork, Stacey Anderson credited the success of When We All Fall Asleep to Eilish's "creepy eccentricity" which "helps distance her from the music industry's historically lewd maceration of teen idols". Christopher Thiessen of Consequence of Sound praised the album's "impressive cohesiveness and emotional engagement", and claimed that its production "perfectly complements" Eilish's vocals. The Guardian's Laura Snapes echoed these sentiments, additionally characterizing O'Connell's production as "compellingly nasty". Speculating as to the album's broader cultural impact, Kenneth Womack wrote for Salon in May that the singer has "staked her claim as the reigning queen of electropop" and "the new pop intelligentsia". While crediting O'Connell's production for elevating the "seamless storytelling", Womack said the album presents "a place that exists entirely within the miniature aural world" and is "like no place you've ever been before. Why? Because Eilish hadn't invented it yet."

A number of critics applauded Eilish's ability to discuss the sentiments of her generation. Q writer Dorian Lynskey characterized the release as a "surprising, haunting album" that "will speak powerfully both to her peers and to anyone who remembers how youth can sometimes feel like an overwhelming weight". Neil Z. Yeung of AllMusic named the singer "an avatar for an audience that deals with similar mental health struggles and growing pains", and suggested that the album pointed to "a bright future that could truly go in any direction, as messy and hopeful as youth can get". However, Chris Willman of Variety quipped that "you don't have to be under 21, or 71, to delight in real-dealness when you hear it", having dubbed Eilish "the real deal". Will Hodgkinson, writing for The Times, commended the record's assured nature and added that it "captures one of those rare moments when an artist knows exactly how her audience feels because she feels the same way too".

A few reviewers expressed reservations. Jason Lipshutz from Billboard deemed the album "often thrilling" despite, even due to, the "flaws ... intrinsic to its creator's truth" as listeners can hear Eilish is experimenting and "still figuring out what's in her bag of tricks". Roisin O'Connor was more critical in The Independent, panning its production as "subpar" and the record as "dull and bloated" overall.

=== Rankings ===
At the end of 2019, When We All Fall Asleep, Where Do We Go? appeared on numerous lists of the year's top albums. According to Metacritic, it was the third most frequently ranked album in the top 10 of year-end lists. Several critics and publications ranked it number one, including veteran music critic Robert Christgau, who also named it the fourth-best album of the 2010s and said of Eilish, "No teenager I can recall has ever made such an impressive album, though I guess Elvis's Sun Sessions gets an asterisk, and who knows what will become of her?"

Select year-end rankings
Publication	Accolade	Rank	Ref.
Billboard	The 50 Best Albums of 2019	2	
Complex	The 50 Best Albums of 2019	6	
Consequence of Sound	Top 50 Albums of 2019	1	
Entertainment Weekly	The best albums of 2019	2	
Exclaim!	20 Best Pop and Rock Albums of 2019	17	
The Guardian	The best albums of 2019	3	
The New York Times	Jon Pareles's Best Albums of 2019	1	
NME	The 50 Best Albums of 2019	1	
Pitchfork	The 50 Best Albums of 2019	21	
Rolling Stone	The 50 Best Albums of 2019	2	
Time	The 10 Best Albums of 2019	6	
Uproxx	The Best Albums of 2019	5	
USA Today	10 Best Albums of 2019	3	

Decade-end listings
Publication	List	Rank	Ref.
Billboard	The 100 Greatest Albums of the 2010s	27	
Consequence of Sound	Top 100 Albums of the 2010s	15	
NME	The Best Albums of The Decade: The 2010s	18	
Rolling Stone	The 100 Best Albums of the 2010s	31	
Spin	The 101 Best Albums of 2010s	18	
Uproxx	All The Best Albums of the 2010s, Ranked	72	

All-time lists
Publication	List	Rank	Ref.
Rolling Stone	The 500 Greatest Albums of All Time	397	
Rolling Stone	The 100 Best Debut Albums of All Time (2022)	7	

== Commercial performance ==
=== Streaming ===
When We All Fall Asleep, Where Do We Go? was the most-streamed album globally on Spotify in 2019. On Deezer, When We All Fall Asleep, Where Do We Go? was the most-streamed album of 2019 worldwide. In 2020, the album was the second-most-streamed globally on the platform.

=== North America ===
On April 7, 2019, When We All Fall Asleep, Where Do We Go? debuted at number one on the US Billboard 200 albums chart with 313,000 album-equivalent units consumed, of which 170,000 were pure album sales. The album also recorded 137,000 SEA units, which translates into 194 million on-demand audio streams for the album's songs in its first week, thus representing the third-biggest streaming week of all-time for an album by a woman. She was the eleventh artist to chart on the Billboard 200 under the age of 18. It was also the first album by a youngest female artist to top the chart in 10 years since Demi Lovato's 2009 album Here We Go Again. It later became the first by a youngest female to spend more than a week on the top of the chart in 20 years since Britney Spears with her 1999 album ...Baby One More Time. By June 20, 2019, When We All Fall Asleep had sold 1,304,000 equivalent album units, of which 343,000 are pure sales.

In Canada, the album debuted atop the national album chart with 46,000 total consumption units. By the end of June 2019, the album had been certified double platinum in Canada and was the best-selling record of the year in the country with 174,000 equivalent album units. In Mexico, the album had considerable success, reaching number five on the national record chart. All of its singles were certified multi-Platinum while "Wish You Were Gay", "You Should See Me in a Crown", and "Bad Guy" were certified Diamond. It was the fifth-best-selling English-language album and fifteenth overall in Mexico of 2019 (physical sales). On March 13, 2023, it was certified double Diamond and four-times Platinum by AMPROFON with over 840,000 units sold, making it the 12th-best-selling album in Mexico.

=== Other markets ===
In the United Kingdom, it also opened at number one on the country's Official Album Chart with 48,000 combined sales, making Eilish the youngest ever solo female act to top the chart. By its fourth week of release, it was certified gold by the BPI, indicating 100,000 sold in the country. It is the sixth-best-selling album of the first half of 2019 in the UK, with 200,000 combined sales. In Australia, the album entered the ARIA Albums Chart at number one, with six of its songs occupying places in the top ten of the singles chart. In doing so, Eilish broke Ed Sheeran's record with the most songs with simultaneous placement in this area of the chart. It remained at this position for seven more non-consecutive weeks and has since been certified Platinum. The album returned to number one in Australia following its Album of the Year win at the 62nd Annual Grammy Awards. In France, When We All Fall Asleep, Where Do We Go? was certified Diamond by SNEP in July 2026 for selling over 500,000 units.

Worldwide, When We All Fall Asleep, Where Do We Go? had sold more than 1.2 million pure copies by December 2019, ranking as the fifth-best-selling album of 2019 and third among female artists. Aided by the album's success, Eilish also ranked as the fourth-best-selling artist of 2019 and second among female artists after Taylor Swift.

== Legacy and accolades ==
At the 62nd Annual Grammy Awards in January 2020, When We All Fall Asleep, Where Do We Go? won Eilish and O'Connell Grammy Awards for Album of the Year and Best Pop Vocal Album, while "Bad Guy" won them awards for Record of the Year and Song of the Year. Eilish also won Best New Artist, and O'Connell won Producer of the Year and Best Engineered Album, Non-Classical (as one of the album's engineers). With her feat, Eilish became the second recording artist and first woman to win the ceremony's four major categories—Album of the Year, Record of the Year, Song of the Year, and Best New Artist—in the same year. Aged 18 at the time of winning, it also made Eilish the youngest winner of both the Album of the Year and Record of the Year awards, and the second youngest winner of both the Song of the Year and Best New Artist awards, after Lorde and LeAnn Rimes respectively.

In 2020, the album was ranked at number 397 on "Rolling Stone's 500 Greatest Albums of All Time" list. In 2025, the Recording Academy added Best Album Cover to the categories for the 2026 Grammys, and listed When We All Fall Asleep, Where Do We Go? as one of the most iconic album covers of the 2010s decade, saying that the deliberately eerie artwork looked more suited to a classic 1970s horror than a 2010s big pop girl. In 2026, Spotify listed When We All Fall Asleep, Where Do We Go? as one of the 30 classic pop albums of the streaming era. The audio streaming service added: "In contrast to the polished, danceable tracks dominating the charts at the time, the album pushed alternative sensibilities into the spotlight and helped set the tone for early‑2020s alt-pop."

Awards and nominations
Award	Year (Note: Indicates the year of ceremony. Each year is linked to the article about the awards held that year, wherever possible.)	Category	Result	Ref.
American Music Awards	2019	Favorite Album – Pop/Rock	Nominated	
Apple Music Awards	2019	Album of the Year	Won	
Apple Music Awards	2024	100 Best Albums	Listed	
Billboard Music Awards	2020	Top Billboard 200 Album	Won	
CD Shop Awards	2020	Western Award	Won	
Danish Music Awards	2019	Foreign Album of the Year	Won	
Emma Gaala	2020	Best-Selling Album of the Year	Won	
Fonogram – Hungarian Music Awards	2020	International Pop-Rock Album of the Year	Won	
GAFFA Awards (Denmark)	2020	International Album of the Year	Won	
GAFFA Awards (Sweden)	2020	International Album of the Year	Won	
Grammy Awards	2020	Album of the Year	Won	
Grammy Awards	2020	Best Pop Vocal Album	Won	
Grammy Awards	2020	Best Engineered Album, Non-Classical	Won	
iHeartRadio Music Awards	2020	Alternative Rock Album of the Year	Won	
Juno Awards	2020	International Album of the Year	Won	
LOS40 Music Awards	2019	Best International Album	Won	
People's Choice Awards	2019	Album of 2019	Nominated	
Q Awards	2019	Best Album	Nominated	

== Track listing ==
All tracks are written by Billie Eilish O'Connell and Finneas O'Connell, except where noted. All tracks are produced by F. O'Connell, with co-production on "Bitches Broken Hearts" by Emmit Fenn and additional production on "Bad Guy" by Billie Eilish.

When We All Fall Asleep, Where Do We Go? track listing
No.	Title	Length
1.	"!!!!!!!"	0:14
2.	"Bad Guy"	3:14
3.	"Xanny"	4:04
4.	"You Should See Me in a Crown"	3:01
5.	"All the Good Girls Go to Hell"	2:49
6.	"Wish You Were Gay"	3:42
7.	"When the Party's Over" (writer: F. O'Connell)	3:16
8.	"8"	2:53
9.	"My Strange Addiction" (writer: F. O'Connell)	3:00
10.	"Bury a Friend"	3:13
11.	"Ilomilo"	2:36
12.	"Listen Before I Go"	4:03
13.	"I Love You"	4:52
14.	"Goodbye"	1:59
Total length:		42:56

Japanese edition bonus tracks
No.	Title	Length
15.	"Come Out and Play"	3:30
16.	"When I Was Older"	4:30
Total length:		50:56

Japanese limited deluxe edition bonus track
No.	Title	Length
17.	"Bad Guy (Remix)" (with Justin Bieber)	3:14
Total length:		54:10

Japanese complete edition bonus track
No.	Title	Length
18.	"Everything I Wanted"	4:05
Total length:		58:15

Target reissue CD and international deluxe edition bonus tracks
No.	Title	Length
15.	"When I Was Older"	4:30
16.	"Bitches Broken Hearts" (writers: B. O'Connell, F. O'Connell, Emmit Fenn)	2:56
17.	"Everything I Wanted"	4:05
Total length:		54:27

Japanese complete edition (Disc 2)
No.	Title	Director(s)	Length
1.	"Bad Guy" (music video)	Dave Meyers	3:25
2.	"Xanny" (music video)	Eilish	4:25
3.	"You Should See Me in a Crown" (official video by Takashi Murakami)	Takashi Murakami	3:11
4.	"All the Good Girls Go to Hell" (music video)	Rich Lee	3:41
5.	"When the Party's Over" (music video)	Carlos López Estrada	3:12
6.	"Bury a Friend" (music video)	Michael Chaves	3:32
7.	"Ilomilo" (music video)	Darkroom; Interscope	2:36
8.	"Everything I Wanted" (music video)	Eilish	4:47
Total length:			28:07

=== Notes ===
- All track titles are stylized in all lowercase, except for "When I Was Older", which is stylized in all caps.
- "Bury a Friend" features uncredited additional vocals by Mehki Raine.
- "My Strange Addiction" contains uncredited audio samples from the episode "Threat Level Midnight" of the American television series The Office.
- "When I Was Older" was inspired by the motion picture Roma, and contains audio samples from the film.

== Personnel ==
These credits were adapted from When We All Fall Asleep, Where Do We Go?'s liner notes.

- Billie Eilish – all vocals, songwriting (1–6, 8, 10–14), additional producer (track 2)
- Finneas O'Connell – producer, songwriting
- Rob Kinelski – mixing
- John Greenham – mastering

== Charts ==
=== Weekly charts ===
Weekly chart performance
Chart (2019–2023)	Peak position
Argentine Albums (CAPIF)	2
Australian Albums (ARIA)	1
Austrian Albums (Ö3 Austria)	1
Belgian Albums (Ultratop Flanders)	1
Belgian Albums (Ultratop Wallonia)	5
Canadian Albums (Billboard)	1
Czech Albums (ČNS IFPI)	1
Danish Albums (Hitlisten)	1
Dutch Albums (Album Top 100)	1
Estonian Albums (Eesti Tipp-40)	1
Finnish Albums (Suomen virallinen lista)	1
French Albums (SNEP)	7
German Albums (Offizielle Top 100)	3
German Pop Albums (Offizielle Top 100)	5
Greek Albums (IFPI)	1
Hungarian Albums (MAHASZ)	17
Irish Albums (IRMA)	1
Italian Albums (FIMI)	3
Japan Hot Albums (Billboard Japan)	4
Japanese Albums (Oricon)	11
Latvian Albums (LAIPA)	1
Lithuanian Albums (AGATA)	1
Mexican Albums (Top 100 Mexico)	5
New Zealand Albums (RMNZ)	1
Norwegian Albums (VG-lista)	1
Polish Albums (ZPAV)	3
Portuguese Albums (AFP)	1
Scottish Albums (Official Charts)	1
Slovak Albums (ČNS IFPI)	1
South Korean Albums (Gaon)	24
Spanish Albums (Promusicae)	2
Swedish Albums (Sverigetopplistan)	1
Swiss Albums (Schweizer Hitparade)	1
UK Albums (Official Charts)	1
US Billboard 200	1
US Top Alternative Albums (Billboard)	1
US Top Rock & Alternative Albums (Billboard)	10
US Indie Store Album Sales (Billboard)	1

=== Year-end charts ===
Year-end chart performance (2019)
Chart (2019)	Position
Australian Albums (ARIA)	1
Austrian Albums (Ö3 Austria)	3
Belgian Albums (Ultratop Flanders)	2
Belgian Albums (Ultratop Wallonia)	23
Canadian Albums (Billboard)	2
Czech Albums (ČNS IFPI)	6
Danish Albums (Hitlisten)	3
Dutch Albums (Album Top 100)	2
French Albums (SNEP)	40
German Albums (Offizielle Top 100)	14
Icelandic Albums (Tónlistinn)	1
Irish Albums (IRMA)	3
Italian Albums (FIMI)	15
Latvian Albums (LAIPA)	1
Mexican Albums (Top 100 Mexico)	15
New Zealand Albums (RMNZ)	1
Norwegian Albums (VG-lista)	1
Polish Albums (ZPAV)	22
Portuguese Albums (AFP)	7
Spanish Albums (PROMUSICAE)	23
Swedish Albums (Sverigetopplistan)	1
Swiss Albums (Schweizer Hitparade)	5
UK Albums (OCC)	4
US Billboard 200	1
US Alternative Albums (Billboard)	1
US Top Tastemaker Albums (Billboard)	1
Worldwide Albums (IFPI Global Music Report)	5

Year-end chart performance (2020)
Chart (2020)	Position
Australian Albums (ARIA)	3
Austrian Albums (Ö3 Austria)	4
Belgian Albums (Ultratop Flanders)	3
Belgian Albums (Ultratop Wallonia)	14
Canadian Albums (Billboard)	5
Danish Albums (Hitlisten)	5
Dutch Albums (Album Top 100)	6
French Albums (SNEP)	41
German Albums (Offizielle Top 100)	19
Icelandic Albums (Tónlistinn)	5
Irish Albums (IRMA)	4
Italian Albums (FIMI)	31
Japan Hot Albums (Billboard Japan)	41
New Zealand Albums (RMNZ)	5
Norwegian Albums (VG-lista)	5
Polish Albums (ZPAV)	29
Portuguese Albums (AFP)	10
Spanish Albums (PROMUSICAE)	26
Swedish Albums (Sverigetopplistan)	6
Swiss Albums (Schweizer Hitparade)	3
UK Albums (OCC)	4
US Billboard 200	11
US Alternative Albums (Billboard)	2
Worldwide Albums (IFPI Global Music Report)	3

Year-end chart performance (2021)
Chart (2021)	Position
Australian Albums (ARIA)	12
Austrian Albums (Ö3 Austria)	10
Belgian Albums (Ultratop Flanders)	10
Belgian Albums (Ultratop Wallonia)	46
Canadian Albums (Billboard)	22
Danish Albums (Hitlisten)	21
Dutch Albums (Album Top 100)	28
French Albums (SNEP)	49
German Albums (Offizielle Top 100)	48
Icelandic Albums (Tónlistinn)	13
Irish Albums (IRMA)	23
Italian Albums (FIMI)	74
New Zealand Albums (RMNZ)	21
Norwegian Albums (VG-lista)	13
Polish Albums (ZPAV)	98
Portuguese Albums (AFP)	59
Spanish Albums (PROMUSICAE)	43
Swedish Albums (Sverigetopplistan)	27
Swiss Albums (Schweizer Hitparade)	16
UK Albums (OCC)	33
US Billboard 200	27
US Top Alternative Albums (Billboard)	4

Year-end chart performance (2022)
Chart (2022)	Position
Australian Albums (ARIA)	11
Austrian Albums (Ö3 Austria)	22
Belgian Albums (Ultratop Flanders)	27
Belgian Albums (Ultratop Wallonia)	66
Canadian Albums (Billboard)	47
Danish Albums (Hitlisten)	57
Dutch Albums (Album Top 100)	30
German Albums (Offizielle Top 100)	76
Icelandic Albums (Tónlistinn)	24
Lithuanian Albums (AGATA)	35
New Zealand Albums (RMNZ)	21
Polish Albums (ZPAV)	89
Portuguese Albums (AFP)	70
Swedish Albums (Sverigetopplistan)	75
Swiss Albums (Schweizer Hitparade)	40
UK Albums (OCC)	60
US Billboard 200	58
US Top Alternative Albums (Billboard)	4

Year-end chart performance (2023)
Chart (2023)	Position
Australian Albums (ARIA)	40
Austrian Albums (Ö3 Austria)	55
Belgian Albums (Ultratop Flanders)	25
Belgian Albums (Ultratop Wallonia)	77
Dutch Albums (Album Top 100)	43
Hungarian Albums (MAHASZ)	64
Icelandic Albums (Tónlistinn)	60
New Zealand Albums (RMNZ)	45
Norwegian Albums (VG-lista)	40
Portuguese Albums (AFP)	82
Swedish Albums (Sverigetopplistan)	89
Swiss Albums (Schweizer Hitparade)	58
US Billboard 200	92
US Top Alternative Albums (Billboard)	8

Year-end chart performance (2024)
Chart (2024)	Position
Australian Albums (ARIA)	34
Austrian Albums (Ö3 Austria)	36
Belgian Albums (Ultratop Flanders)	14
Belgian Albums (Ultratop Wallonia)	46
Danish Albums (Hitlisten)	78
Dutch Albums (Album Top 100)	28
German Albums (Offizielle Top 100)	67
Hungarian Albums (MAHASZ)	50
Icelandic Albums (Tónlistinn)	54
Portuguese Albums (AFP)	37
Swedish Albums (Sverigetopplistan)	78
Swiss Albums (Schweizer Hitparade)	29
UK Albums (OCC)	97
US Billboard 200	110
US Top Alternative Albums (Billboard)	11

Year-end chart performance (2025)
Chart (2025)	Position
Australian Albums (ARIA)	33
Austrian Albums (Ö3 Austria)	23
Belgian Albums (Ultratop Flanders)	14
Belgian Albums (Ultratop Wallonia)	37
Danish Albums (Hitlisten)	72
Dutch Albums (Album Top 100)	23
German Albums (Offizielle Top 100)	44
Hungarian Albums (MAHASZ)	59
Icelandic Albums (Tónlistinn)	56
Polish Albums (ZPAV)	50
Swedish Albums (Sverigetopplistan)	46
Swiss Albums (Schweizer Hitparade)	29
UK Albums (OCC)	82
US Billboard 200	116
US Top Alternative Albums (Billboard)	13

=== Decade-end charts ===
Decade-end chart performance (2010–2019)
Chart (2010–2019)	Position
Norwegian Albums (VG-lista)	23
UK Vinyl Albums (OCC)	75
US Billboard 200	53

== Certifications and sales ==
Certifications and sales
Region	Certification	Certified units/sales
Australia (ARIA)	5× Platinum	350,000^{‡}
Austria (IFPI Austria)	4× Platinum	60,000^{‡}
Belgium (BRMA)	Platinum	20,000^{‡}
Canada (Music Canada)	7× Platinum	560,000^{‡}
Czech Republic (IFPI)	Platinum	
Denmark (IFPI Danmark)	7× Platinum	140,000^{‡}
France (SNEP)	Diamond	500,000^{‡}
Germany (BVMI)	2× Platinum	400,000^{‡}
Hungary (MAHASZ)	3× Platinum	12,000^{‡}
Iceland (FHF)	Gold	10,760
Italy (FIMI)	3× Platinum	150,000^{‡}
Mexico (AMPROFON)	2× Diamond+4× Platinum	840,000^{‡}
New Zealand (RMNZ)	7× Platinum	105,000^{‡}
Norway (IFPI Norway)	7× Platinum	140,000^{‡}
Poland (ZPAV)	Diamond	100,000^{‡}
Portugal (AFP)	Platinum	15,000^{^}
Singapore (RIAS)	2× Platinum	20,000^{*}
Spain (Promusicae)	Platinum	40,000^{‡}
United Kingdom (BPI)	3× Platinum	900,000^{‡}
United States (RIAA)	4× Platinum	4,000,000^{‡}
Summaries
Worldwide combined sales with streaming	—	17,800,000
^{*} Sales figures based on certification alone.^{^} Shipments figures based on certification alone.^{‡} Sales+streaming figures based on certification alone.

== See also ==
- List of Billboard 200 number-one albums of 2019
- List of number-one albums of 2019 (Canada)
- List of UK Albums Chart number ones of 2019
- List of albums which have spent the most weeks on the UK Albums Chart
- List of best-selling albums in France
- List of best-selling albums in Mexico
