= Ilomilo (song) =

2020 single by Billie Eilish

"ilomilo"
- Live version artwork

Single by Billie Eilish

from the album When We All Fall Asleep, Where Do We Go?
- Released: April 10, 2020
- Genre: Electropop; electronic industrial
- Length: 2:36
- Label: Universal
- Songwriters: Billie Eilish; Finneas O'Connell
- Producer: Finneas O'Connell

Billie Eilish singles chronology
"No Time to Die" (2020)	"ilomilo" (2020)	"My Future" (2020)

Audio video
- Ilomilo on YouTube

"Ilomilo" (/iːloʊˈmiːloʊ/; stylized in all lowercase) is a song by American singer-songwriter Billie Eilish and the seventh, and final single from her debut studio album, When We All Fall Asleep, Where Do We Go? (2019). The song was released to Italian contemporary hit radio stations on April 10, 2020, by Universal Music Group, and to US alternative radio on May 26, 2020, through Darkroom and Interscope Records. Musically an electropop and electronic industrial track with ska-influenced instrumentation, the song was heavily inspired by the puzzle video game of the same name. The track also references "Bury a Friend", its predecessor on the album track list. Eilish wrote the song with her producer, Finneas O'Connell.

The song address several topics including the fear of separation, while her distorted and stuttering voice is sung over a similarly deformed bass. For promotional purposes, the song was performed live during Eilish's 2019 When We All Fall Asleep Tour and her Where Do We Go? World Tour in 2020. On April 24, 2020, an animated visualizer was released for the song. Upon the release of When We All Fall Asleep, Where Do We Go?, the song reached number 62 on the US Billboard Hot 100 and charted within the top 40 in Canada and Australia. It was certified gold in each of these countries.

== Background ==
"Ilomilo" was written by Eilish and her brother, Finneas O'Connell, who also produced it. Mastering and mixing was handled by studio personnel, John Greenham and Rob Kinelski, respectively. Casey Cuayo is credited as studio personnel and as an additional mixer. In an Instagram story on March 25, 2020, Eilish shared a playlist of her inspirations for the track, which included songs from XXXTentacion, Kavinsky, Daniel Olsen and Aaron Zigman. When Eilish mentions the song to her mother Maggie Baird, she describes the track as "being a parent to her".

== Composition and lyrical interpretation ==
According to sheet music website Musicnotes.com, "Ilomilo" is moderately fast at 120 beats per minute (BPM) and is played in the key of C minor. Eilish's vocals range between G_{3} to A♭_{4}. Critical commentary described "Ilomilo" as a mid-tempo electropop and electronic industrial track. The New York Times's Jon Pareles noted the use of a "briskly plinking, near-ska beat" in its instrumentation. Throughout the song, her voice is distorted to sound like she is stuttering, and her vocal track is layered over a similarly deformed-sounding bass and "paranoid" synths. Sean Ward, for The Line of Best Fit, wrote that the song sees "the demon is in a place of contemplation".

In April 2020, during a 50-minute Verizon livestream, Eilish explains "Ilomilo" is about "losing somebody, or being afraid of losing somebody and it kind of being inevitable. It feels horrible and terrifying. Especially when you lose a person, it's a horrible feeling, so it's the feeling of being afraid." The singer revealed the puzzle video game of the same name, whose goal is to reunite two characters named "Ilo" and "Milo" who hug afterwards, was a major inspiration for the song. Music critics have associated its lyrics with the fear of separation (in lines such as "I don't wanna be lonely" and "I can't lose another life"), to a failed relationship ("I just wanted to protect you / But now I'll never get to") and suicidal thoughts ("I might break / If you're gonna die not by mistake"). Chris DeVille, writing for Stereogum, noted that the song finds Eilish "in a world wrecked by tragedy". The lyrics in the second verse of "Ilomilo"—"The friends I've had to bury / They keep me up at night"—reference the single "Bury a Friend" (2019), the song's predecessor on When We All Fall Asleep, Where Do We Go?, which ends with the opening instrumental section of "Ilomilo". Elaborating on this in an interview on MTV, O'Connell said the two songs only referenced each other for the purpose of making the album "cohesive", and that they were not linked in any other way.

== Critical reception ==
"Ilomilo" was met with positive reviews from music critics. Insider's Libby Torres, called the track "catchy" and felt its lyrics "[do] [their] best to parse the emptiness left by someone important", as "insanely relatable". Jason Lipshutz of Billboard also commended the lyrics, which he described as "propulsive". Sam Prance of PopBuzz stated the song's production was "clever". Madeline Roth of MTV called the song a "thumping beat", while Deville described it as "skittering". Sean Ward writing for The Line of Best Fit, interpreted the song as being "disturbing". Yasmin Cowan of Clash depicted the song as an "anxious lullaby". The staff of NME, who called the song "fitting", commented that as you listen to the track, your "interest in 'Ilomilo' will only grow the more you listen to it."

== Release and commercial performance ==
On March 29, 2019, "Ilomilo" was released as the eleventh track on Billie Eilish's debut studio album When We All Fall Asleep, Where Do We Go?. The song was sent to Italian contemporary hit radio stations on April 10, 2020, by Universal Music Group, and later to US alternative radio on May 26 through Darkroom and Interscope Records, as the album's seventh and final single. On February 22, 2020, Eilish released a live version of "Ilomilo" that was performed at the Houston's Toyota Center on October 10, 2019.

Following the release of When We All Fall Asleep, Where Do We Go?, "Ilomilo" debuted at number 62 on the US Billboard Hot 100. At the same time, Eilish broke the record for the most simultaneous Hot 100 entries for a female artist. After its release to US alternative radio, "Ilomilo" peaked at number 25 on the Alternative Airplay chart and number 30 on the Hot Rock & Alternative Songs chart. It has been certified gold by the Recording Industry Association of America (RIAA), which denotes track-equivalent sales of 500,000 units based on sales and streams. "Ilomilo" charted within the top 20 in Lithuania and Latvia. The song has further peaked within the top 40 in Australia and Canada. It earned a gold certification by Music Canada (MC) and Federazione Industria Musicale Italiana (FIMI), and a double platinum certification by the Australian Recording Industry Association (ARIA). "Ilomilo" reached modest peaks in Germany, Sweden and the Netherlands among others. The song achieved moderate success in the United Kingdom, peaking at number 37 on the UK Streaming chart.

== Live performances and other usages ==
The visualizer for "Ilomilo" depicts deep sea creatures.

To promote "Ilomilo", Eilish performed it at the Coachella Valley Music and Arts Festival in April, at the Glastonbury Festival in June, and at Pukkelpop in August 2019. "Ilomilo" was included on the setlist of Eilish's 2019 When We All Fall Asleep Tour. In December 2019, Eilish performed "Ilomilo" at the Steve Jobs Theater for the first annual Apple Music Awards after she won artist of the year, with O'Connell playing the piano. The track was also included on the setlist of her 2020 Where Do We Go? World Tour. In April of the same year, Eilish and O'Connell performed the song during the 50-minute Verizon livestream. "Ilomilo" was included on Eilish's Happier Than Ever, The World Tour (2022).

In March 2020, American a cappella group Pentatonix recorded a cover of "Ilomilo" exclusively for WhatsApp using 8D technology. An animated visualizer to accompany the song, depicting deep sea creatures, was released to Eilish's YouTube channel on April 24, 2020.

== Credits and personnel ==
Credits adapted from Tidal.

- Casey Cuayo – assistant mixer, studio personnel
- Billie Eilish – vocals, songwriter
- John Greenham – mastering engineer, studio personnel
- Rob Kinelski – mixer, studio personnel
- Finneas O'Connell – producer, songwriter

== Charts ==
=== Weekly charts ===
Weekly chart performance for "Ilomilo"
Chart (2019–2021)	Peak position
Australia (ARIA)	23
Canada Hot 100 (Billboard)	38
Czech Republic Singles Digital (ČNS IFPI)	32
Estonia (Eesti Tipp-40)	13
Germany (GfK)	98
Greece International (IFPI)	25
Hungary (Stream Top 40)	24
Iceland (Tónlistinn)	39
Italy (FIMI)	94
Latvia (LAIPA)	15
Lithuania (AGATA)	13
Netherlands (Single Top 100)	63
Portugal (AFP)	55
Russia Airplay (TopHit) Unofficial MBNN Remix	8
San Marino (SMRRTV Top 50)	25
Slovakia Singles Digital (ČNS IFPI)	19
Sweden (Sverigetopplistan)	63
Turkey International Airplay (Radiomonitor)	2
Ukraine Airplay (TopHit) Unofficial MBNN Remix	8
UK Audio Streaming (Official Charts)	37
US Billboard Hot 100	62
US Hot Rock & Alternative Songs (Billboard)	30
US Rock & Alternative Airplay (Billboard)	48

=== Year-end charts ===
Year-end chart performance for "Ilomilo"
Chart (2020)	Position
CIS (Tophit) Unofficial MBNN Remix	53
Russia Airplay (Tophit) Unofficial MBNN Remix	50
Chart (2021)	Position
Ukraine Airplay (Tophit) Unofficial MBNN Remix	20

== Certifications ==
Certifications and sales for "Ilomilo"
Region	Certification	Certified units/sales
Australia (ARIA)	2× Platinum	140,000^{‡}
Austria (IFPI Austria)	Gold	15,000^{‡}
Brazil (Pro-Música Brasil)	2× Platinum	80,000^{‡}
Canada (Music Canada)	2× Platinum	160,000^{‡}
Denmark (IFPI Danmark)	Gold	45,000^{‡}
France (SNEP)	Gold	100,000^{‡}
Italy (FIMI)	Gold	35,000^{‡}
New Zealand (RMNZ)	Platinum	30,000^{‡}
Poland (ZPAV)	Platinum	50,000^{‡}
Portugal (AFP)	Gold	5,000^{‡}
Spain (Promusicae)	Gold	30,000^{‡}
United Kingdom (BPI)	Gold	400,000^{‡}
United States (RIAA)	Gold	500,000^{‡}
^{‡} Sales+streaming figures based on certification alone.

== Release history ==
Release dates and formats for "Ilomilo"
Region	Date	Format(s)	Version	Label(s)	Ref.
Italy	April 10, 2020	Radio airplay	Original	Universal	
United States	May 26, 2020	Alternative radio	Original	Darkroom; Interscope	
Various	February 22, 2021	Digital download; streaming	Live version	Darkroom; Interscope	
