= My Strange Addiction (song) =

2019 song by Billie Eilish

Song by Billie Eilish

from the album When We All Fall Asleep, Where Do We Go?
- Released: March 29, 2019
- Genre: Disco; electropop; hip-hop; synth-funk
- Length: 3:00
- Label: Darkroom; Interscope
- Songwriter: Finneas O'Connell
- Producer: Finneas O'Connell

"My Strange Addiction" (stylized in all lowercase) is a song by American singer Billie Eilish from her debut studio album, When We All Fall Asleep, Where Do We Go? (2019). It was written by her brother Finneas O'Connell, who also produced the song. The song has been certified platinum in the US and Canada and has reached number 43 on the US Billboard Hot 100. It also peaked at number 12 in Australia, 21 in Canada and New Zealand, 39 in Ireland and Norway, 46 in Sweden, 51 in the Netherlands and at 100 in Italy.

== Background ==
The song uses clips from "Threat Level Midnight", an episode of The Office, a comedy show that previously aired on NBC. In an interview, Billie Eilish stated that she had been a "superfan" of the show. In a quote, Eilish stated that, when creating the song, she thought that the beat produced was similar to that of an instrumental track used within the movie's Scarn Dance scene. Subsequently, she decided to use quotes from the movie; instead of going through the normal routes to get permission to use the audio in the song, she instead ripped the audio from the show. She stated that the reason for including clips from The Office was because she considered the show to be her strange addiction.

== Credits and personnel ==
Credits adapted from Tidal and the liner notes of When We All Fall Asleep, Where Do We Go?.

- Billie Eilish – vocals
- Finneas O'Connell – producer, songwriter
- Casey Cuayo – assistant mixer, studio personnel
- John Greenham – mastering engineer, studio personnel
- Rob Kinelski – mixer, studio personnel

== Charts ==
Chart performance for "My Strange Addiction"
Chart (2019)	Peak position
Australia (ARIA)	12
Canada Hot 100 (Billboard)	21
Czech Republic Singles Digital (ČNS IFPI)	20
Estonia (Eesti Tipp-40)	8
Germany (GfK)	86
Greece (IFPI)	11
Hungary (Stream Top 40)	12
Iceland (Tónlistinn)	29
Ireland (IRMA)	39
Italy (FIMI)	100
Latvia (LAIPA)	7
Lithuania (AGATA)	5
Netherlands (Single Top 100)	51
New Zealand (Recorded Music NZ)	21
Norway (VG-lista)	39
Portugal (AFP)	48
Slovakia Singles Digital (ČNS IFPI)	13
Sweden (Sverigetopplistan)	46
UK Audio Streaming (Official Charts)	24
US Billboard Hot 100	43

== Certifications ==
Certifications and sales for "My Strange Addiction"
Region	Certification	Certified units/sales
Australia (ARIA)	2× Platinum	140,000^{‡}
Austria (IFPI Austria)	Gold	15,000^{‡}
Brazil (Pro-Música Brasil)	2× Platinum	80,000^{‡}
Canada (Music Canada)	2× Platinum	160,000^{‡}
Denmark (IFPI Danmark)	Gold	45,000^{‡}
France (SNEP)	Gold	100,000^{‡}
Mexico (AMPROFON)	Gold	30,000^{‡}
New Zealand (RMNZ)	Platinum	30,000^{‡}
Poland (ZPAV)	Gold	10,000^{‡}
Portugal (AFP)	Gold	5,000^{‡}
Spain (Promusicae)	Gold	30,000^{‡}
United Kingdom (BPI)	Gold	400,000^{‡}
United States (RIAA)	Platinum	1,000,000^{‡}
^{‡} Sales+streaming figures based on certification alone.
