= Bury a Friend =

2019 single by Billie Eilish

Single by Billie Eilish

from the album When We All Fall Asleep, Where Do We Go?
- Released: January 30, 2019
- Genre: Electronica; electropop; synth-pop; trip hop
- Length: 3:13
- Label: Darkroom; Interscope
- Songwriters: Billie Eilish; Finneas O'Connell
- Producer: Finneas O'Connell

Billie Eilish singles chronology
"When I Was Older" (2019)	"Bury a Friend" (2019)	"Wish You Were Gay" (2019)

Music video
- "Bury a Friend" on YouTube

"Bury a Friend" (stylized in all lowercase) is a song by American singer-songwriter Billie Eilish and the third single from her debut studio album, When We All Fall Asleep, Where Do We Go? (2019), of which a line on the song inspired the album's title. It was released on January 30, 2019, and serviced to US alternative radio stations on February 19, 2019, through Darkroom and Interscope Records. The song was described as electronica, electropop, synth-pop, and trip hop in press reviews, for which hip-hop beats, industrial influences, percussion, and a synthesizer provide minimalist instrumentation. Within the dark and violent lyrics, Eilish sings from the perspective of a monster under someone's bed. Her vocals are subtle and treated with layers of vocal effects. Eilish wrote the song with its producer, Finneas O'Connell.

"Bury a Friend" received generally positive reviews from music critics, several of whom praised its dark nature and lyrics. The song was also likened to the music of Marilyn Manson, Lorde and Kanye West. It attained commercial success, including reaching number one in Sweden and Latvia. The song further peaked within the top ten in New Zealand, Canada, Australia, and the United Kingdom. The Recording Industry Association of America (RIAA) awarded it a triple platinum certification.

Michael Chaves directed the music video for "Bury a Friend", which was uploaded to Eilish's YouTube channel at the same time as the song's first release. The video depicts Eilish singing under the bed of British rapper Mehki Raine (known as Crooks at the time), who provides uncredited vocals on the song, being pulled by black gloves, and walking through a rundown apartment. Critics noted the video's horror elements. Eilish promoted the song by performing it live at venues in 2019, including the Coachella Valley Music and Arts Festival, Glastonbury Festival and during her When We All Fall Asleep Tour. It was also included on the setlist of her 2020 Where Do We Go? World Tour, her 2022 Happier Than Ever, The World Tour, and her 2024 Hit Me Hard and Soft: The Tour.

== Background and development ==
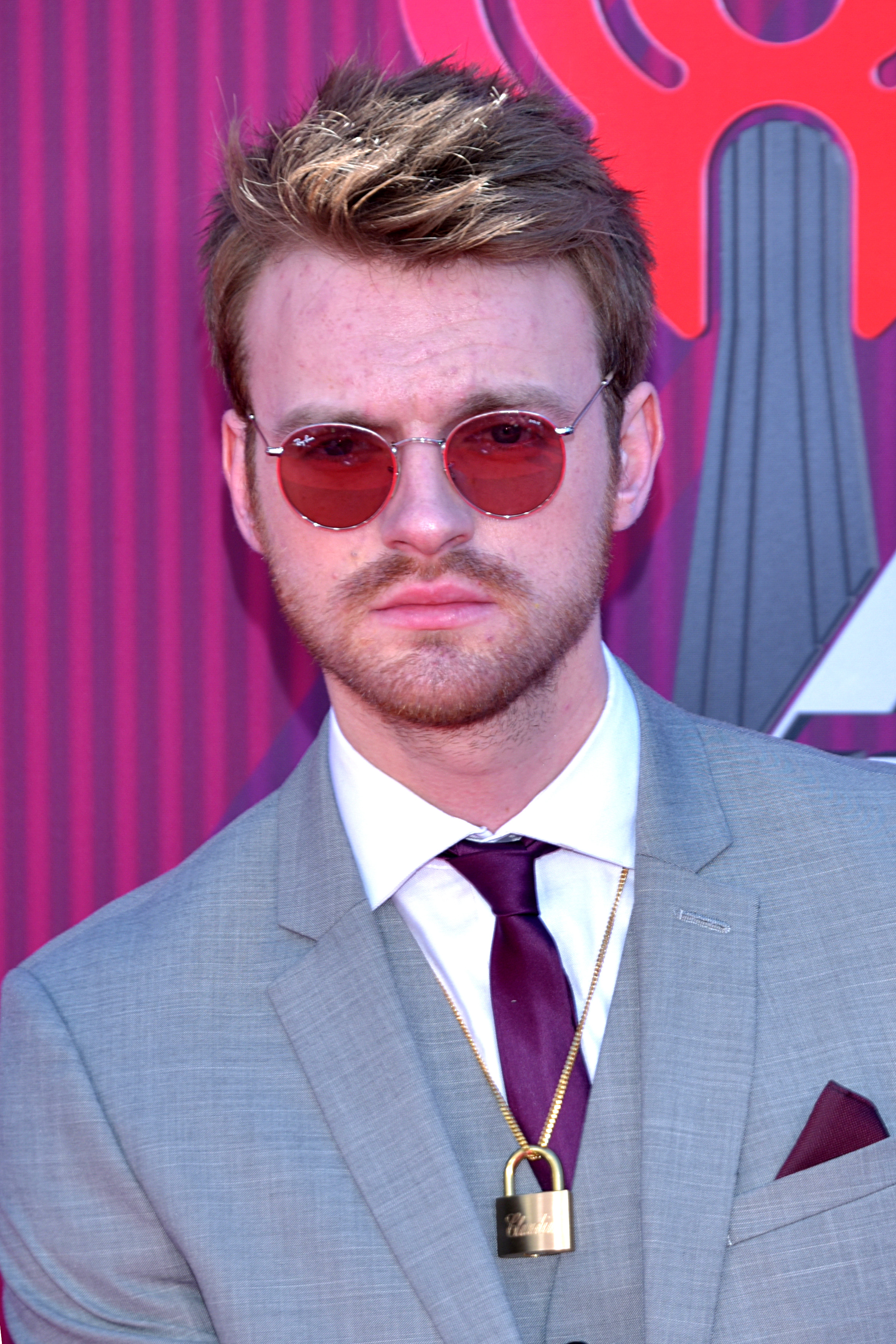
Eilish's brother Finneas O'Connell contributed to the song's writing and production.

On January 29, 2019, Billie Eilish formally announced the release of When We All Fall Asleep, Where Do We Go? and also revealed that she would release a single the next day at 9 am (PT). She further posted a 16-second teaser of the song, featuring her singing while being grabbed and pushed by gloved hands. "Bury a Friend" was eventually released on the scheduled date, having premiered on Zane Lowe's Beats 1 show as the day's World Record. Eilish further made an appearance on Annie Mac's Future Sounds show on BBC Radio 1 to discuss the track. It was serviced to US alternative radio stations on February 19, 2019, by Darkroom and Interscope Records. "Bury a Friend" was written by Eilish along with her brother Finneas O'Connell, while production was solely handled by the latter. The song was mastered by John Greenham and mixed by Rob Kinelski, with both also serving as studio personnel.

The creation of the song took place in Chicago, where Eilish and her brother were visiting for a Lollapalooza performance. They attended a studio with a "shuffle beat" in mind, with Eilish drawing a black monster to show her brother what she wanted the song to sound like. Eilish desired to hear her name at the beginning of the track, for which she texted rapper Calvin (known as Mehki Raine); he ultimately sent Eilish a phone recording for her to use. The singer discovered the rapper on social media due to him repeatedly tagging pictures of himself with the caption "Where's Billie at?" on her Instagram comments. She decided to make him her acquaintance and the two soon became friends.

== Composition and lyrical interpretation ==
Eilish credited the song for setting the tone for When We All Fall Asleep, Where Do We Go?, stating: "I immediately knew what it was going to be about, what the visuals were going to be, and everything in terms of how I wanted it to be perceived". "Bury a Friend" has been described as a minimalist electronica, electropop, synth-pop, and trip hop track with industrial elements in press reviews. Suzy Exposito of Rolling Stone called it "goth-R&B" reminiscent of Marilyn Manson's Antichrist Superstar (1996). The song is moderately fast at 120 beats per minute (BPM), and is written in the key of G harmonic minor. Its minimalist instrumentation features a hip-hop and "galloping" beat similar to Kanye West's "Black Skinhead" (2013). "Rumbling" percussion, "scattered" synth melodies, screams, and a screeching recording of an orthodontist shaving off Eilish's dental brace attachments are also included. Charlie Harding of Vox pointed out "a broken song form with strange alternate verses and a bridge placed untraditionally after a verse, rather than immediately following a penultimate chorus. The effect is destabilizing, and yet still accessible to the average listener". The melody presented during the chorus has been likened to the Doors' "People Are Strange" (1967), and sonically described as "innocuous as a childhood rhyme", contrasting the rest of the song.

According to Eilish, the track's "dark" and "violent" lyrics are written from the perspective of "the monster under your bed. Anything could be the monster — it could be someone you love so much that it’s taking over your life. I think love and terror and hatred are all the same thing". Laura Dzubay of Consequence of Sound interpreted: "[Eilish] assumes the position of a monster there to haunt somebody (a lover or herself [...])." The Michigan Daily's Samantha Cathie thought the fact that the singer was "hat[ing] herself" mirrored in the lines: "Like I wanna drown, like I wanna end me” and "Honestly I thought that I would be dead by now". Eilish asks several questions during the song's refrain: "What do you want from me? Why don’t you run from me? What are you wondering? What do you know? Why aren’t you scared of me? Why do you care for me? When we all fall asleep, where do we go?". Further lyrics include: "Step on the glass, staple your tongue/ Bury a friend, try to wake up/ Cannibal class, killing the son/ Bury a friend, I wanna end me". The singer's "soft" vocals in "Bury a Friend" range between the notes of F#_{3} and B♭_{4}. They are treated with layers of vocal effects, and a "playful trickery [is used] in each hook". Eilish described the track as a "near-whispered sing-song duet between [her] and a distorted version of herself". It ends with an instrumental part of "Ilomilo", which follows on When We All Fall Asleep, Where Do We Go?; the latter in turn begins with a lyrical reference to "Bury a Friend". Elaborating on the matter in an interview with MTV, O'Connell stated that the two songs were only referencing each other for the purpose of making the album "cohesive", and that they were not linked in any other way.

== Critical reception ==
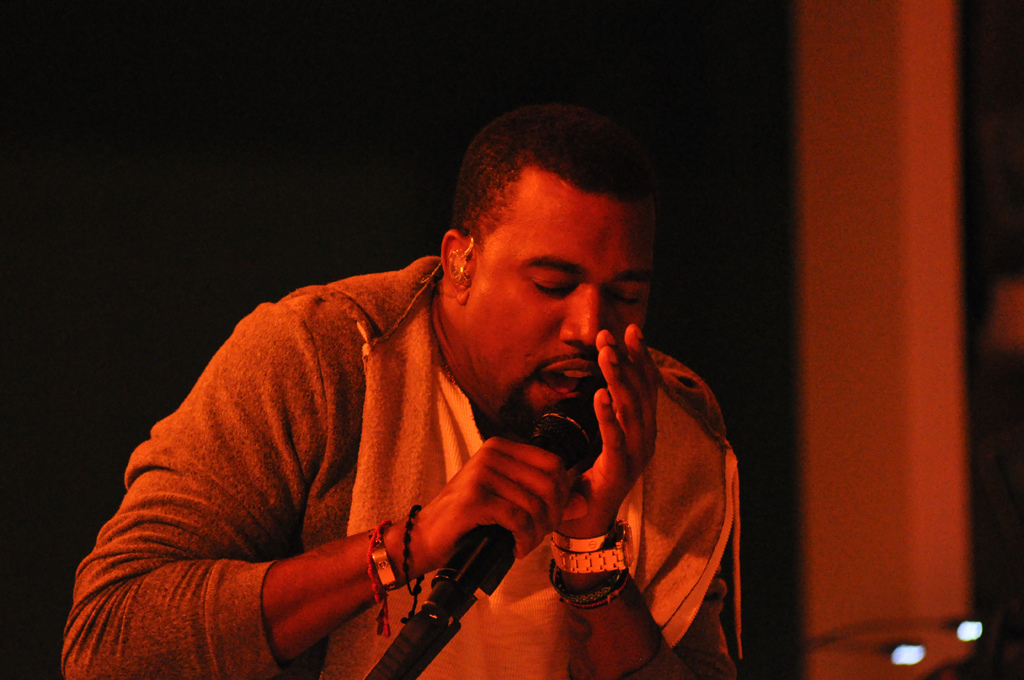
The song's production has been likened to that of Kanye West's (pictured) album Yeezus.

Upon release, "Bury a Friend" received generally positive reviews from music critics. Several publications saw the song as her best single, as well as a highlight of When We All Fall Asleep, Where Do We Go?. It was likened to Lorde's "Royals" (2013), as well as its production to that on West's Yeezus (2013). Thomas Smith of NME saw "Bury a Friend" as "a sizeable middle finger to anyone who expected a twinkly ballad befitting to her lone EP, 2017's Don't Smile at Me", as well as a "statement" for "vocalising the uncertainties and inquisitions of a generation ready to make their mark". DIY's Lisa Wright labelled the song "intoxicating and intriguing – aka exactly what you want from a new star". Chloe Gilke of Uproxx praised the "full of bizarre, screechy flourishes and dips into the nightmarish" and claimed that "somehow the song’s lyrics are just as specific and creepy". Similarly, an editor for The Music Network commented on the song's "sinister [nature] in name and "lyric" and claimed that it is "unsettling", despite there being "something tranquil and thoughtful about it". The Independent's Roisin O'Connor praised "Bury a Friend" as "excellent", and also noted its "imperious" and "anthemic quality". She further commented on the successful use of Eilish's "formula": "murmuring in cool low tones over a pulsing beat". In a lukewarm review, Samantha Cantie of The Michigan Daily saw the song as "slightly disappointing". She wrote: "[A] letdown is her seeming embrace of making an abnormal creation because it’s cool, as opposed to creating something with the beauty of sound as a priority", and elaborated, stating: "The track is choppy, cutting from different melodies quite quickly – these melodies bump, but they’re fleeting". Joe Coscarelli noted an "odd structure" and "nightmare lyrics".

== Commercial performance ==
"Bury a Friend" attained commercial success. It debuted at number 74 on the US Billboard Hot 100 before moving 60 places to number 14 with 29.1 million streams and 18,000 downloads sold in its first full week of tracking, becoming Eilish's highest peak on the chart at the time, before being surpassed by "Bad Guy" (2019). The song also became the singer's first number one on a Billboard radio airplay chart, topping the US Alternative Songs chart in May 2019. This made Eilish only the tenth solo woman in a lead role to reach number one in the chart's three-decade history. In the United Kingdom, "Bury a Friend" reached number six, making it Eilish's first top ten in the country. The song has further peaked at number one in Sweden and Latvia, and within the top ten in countries such as New Zealand, Australia and Canada. It has been awarded several certifications, most notably triple platinum by the Recording Industry Association of America (RIAA).

== Music video ==
An accompanying music video for "Bury a Friend" was uploaded to Eilish's official YouTube channel on January 30, 2019. It was directed by Michael Chaves in the span of a day. The clip contains horror elements, which have led to it being regarded by reviewers as "creepy" and "haunting". Eilish explained: "I had this idea where I’m naked. Like an abduction-type thing, completely not in control, just a helpless body, and people putting syringes up my arms and in my neck. That’s one of people’s biggest fears—needles—and that’s what I’ve been doing recently: honing in on people’s fears".

The video begins in a hotel at night. Mehki Raine awakens from a nightmare and goes back to sleep, while Eilish, hiding under his bed, slowly rises to watch him sleep. The singer then walks outside the room slowly before she is pulled and prodded by hands covered with black latex gloves. Eilish is then injected with syringes, and she attempts to run. Eilish's attempts don't work, and she is stabbed with more and more needles until she finally falls to her knees as black twitches under her skin and Eilish slinks back under the bed, her eyes turning all black. Critics have likened the visual to works released by Alice Glass, Chris Cunningham and Floria Sigismondi. Others compared it to the films Suspiria (2018) and Get Out (2017), the television series The Haunting of Hill House, and Stephen King's 1977 novel The Shining.

== Notable live performances ==
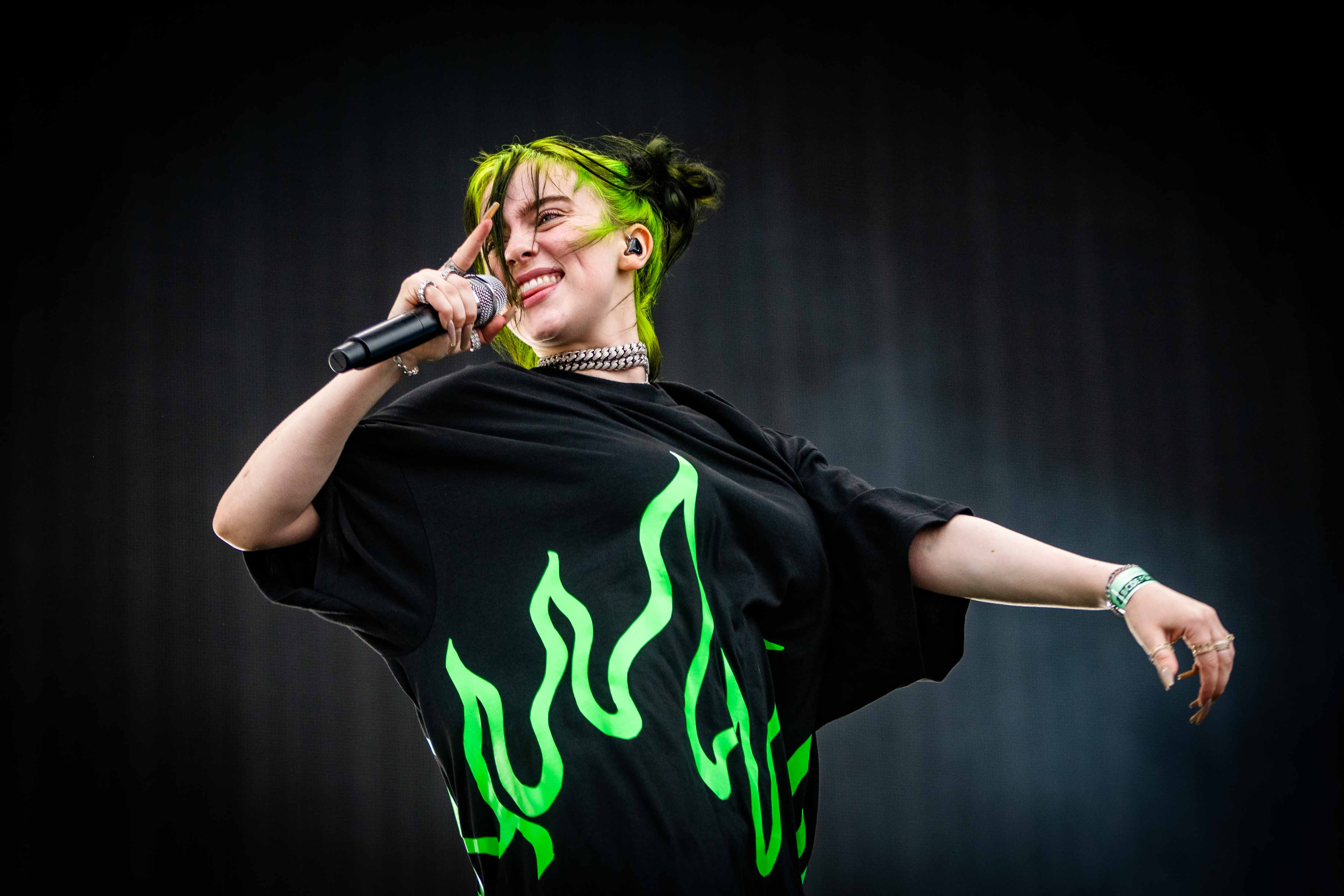
Eilish performing "Bury a Friend" during Pukkelpop in August 2019.

Eilish performed the song on BBC Radio 1 in February 2019, and on Jimmy Kimmel Live! in March. For the latter performance, the singer sang on a dark, smoke-filled stage and "summon[ed] a large cloth that swung behind her, casting a monster-like shadow while she bent over backwards". She wore a baggy black sweater and shorts, alongside a neon green frowny face print". In April, May and June, Eilish performed the track at the Coachella Valley Music and Arts Festival, BBC Radio 1's Big Weekend, and the Glastonbury Festival, respectively. She later sang it during Pukkelpop in August, and included "Bury a Friend" on the setlist of her When We All Fall Asleep Tour (2019) and Where Do We Go? World Tour (2020) tours. "Bury a Friend" was further added to Eilish's Happier Than Ever, The World Tour (2022).

== In popular culture ==
The song was featured in the television series The Society. Kaitlin Reilly writing for Refinery29 noted similarity between the lyrics and the series' plot.

In October 2021, a remix of "Bury a Friend" by Chris Avantgarde was used in the Zombies reveal trailer for Call of Duty: Vanguard. The track was further included in the pilot episode of Dickinson on Apple TV+, the fifth episode of the fourth season of Netflix's Big Mouth, in the 2021 film Sing 2, in the 2022 film Kimi, the last scene of the fifth season of Hulu's The Handmaid's Tale, and the fifth episode of the second season of the animated web series The Vampair by Daria Cohen.

The song featured in the trailers for the American Amazon Prime Video original series Carnival Row, and trailers for the 2024 films Madame Web and Night Swim. It is also used as the theme song for True Detective: Night Country, as well as serving as significant inspiration for the season as a whole. Showrunner Issa López wrote the season during COVID-19 lockdown while listening to Eilish's music.

== Cover versions ==
Zeds Dead remixed "Bury a Friend" to acclaim from Billboard's Kat Bein, who included it in her 12 Best Billie Eilish Remixes list. She stated that the remix takes the original song and "runs it through a few sonic filters [while] [m]oody ambience gives way to fat bass synths [...] [,] old-school dubstep wub-dubs [and] [...] drums [which] kick up in a slow-down UK garage style in the later half".

British pop group Duran Duran released a cover version of this song on their 2023 Halloween-themed album Danse Macabre.

== Credits and personnel ==
Credits adapted from Tidal.

- Billie Eilish – vocals, songwriter
- Finneas O'Connell – producer, songwriter
- John Greenham – mastering engineer, studio personnel
- Rob Kinelski – mixing, studio personnel

== Charts ==
=== Weekly charts ===
Weekly chart performance for "Bury a Friend"
Chart (2019)	Peak position
Argentina (Argentina Hot 100)	85
Australia (ARIA)	3
Austria (Ö3 Austria Top 40)	6
Belgium (Ultratop 50 Flanders)	13
Belgium (Ultratop 50 Wallonia)	42
Canada Hot 100 (Billboard)	10
Czech Republic Singles Digital (ČNS IFPI)	3
Denmark (Tracklisten)	8
Estonia (Eesti Tipp-40)	2
Finland (Suomen virallinen lista)	4
France (SNEP)	82
Germany (GfK)	14
Greece (IFPI)	2
Hungary (Single Top 40)	10
Hungary (Stream Top 40)	2
Iceland (Tónlistinn)	14
Ireland (IRMA)	2
Italy (FIMI)	27
Japan Hot 100 (Billboard)	46
Latvia (LaIPA)	1
Lithuania (AGATA)	2
Malaysia (RIM)	12
Mexico (Billboard Mexican Airplay)	36
Netherlands (Dutch Top 40)	29
Netherlands (Single Top 100)	10
New Zealand (Recorded Music NZ)	2
Norway (VG-lista)	2
Portugal (AFP)	8
Scottish Singles Sales (Official Charts)	18
Singapore (RIAS)	10
Slovakia Singles Digital (ČNS IFPI)	2
South Korea (Gaon)	188
Spain (Promusicae)	26
Sweden (Sverigetopplistan)	1
Switzerland (Schweizer Hitparade)	10
UK Singles (Official Charts)	6
US Billboard Hot 100	14
US Rock & Alternative Airplay (Billboard)	5
US Rolling Stone Top 100	56

=== Year-end charts ===
Year-end chart performance for "Bury a Friend"
Chart (2019)	Position
Australia (ARIA)	26
Austria (Ö3 Austria Top 40)	56
Belgium (Ultratop Flanders)	53
Canada (Canadian Hot 100)	41
Denmark (Tracklisten)	36
Hungary (Stream Top 40)	27
Iceland (Tónlistinn)	64
Ireland (IRMA)	27
Latvia (LAIPA)	17
Netherlands (Single Top 100)	90
New Zealand (Recorded Music NZ)	24
Norway (VG-lista)	31
Portugal (AFP)	66
Sweden (Sverigetopplistan)	24
Switzerland (Schweizer Hitparade)	70
UK Singles (Official Charts Company)	36
US Billboard Hot 100	73
US Rock Airplay (Billboard)	26
US Rolling Stone Top 100	33

== Certifications ==
Certifications for "Bury a Friend"
Region	Certification	Certified units/sales
Australia (ARIA)	6× Platinum	420,000^{‡}
Austria (IFPI Austria)	Platinum	30,000^{‡}
Belgium (BRMA)	Platinum	40,000^{‡}
Brazil (Pro-Música Brasil)	Diamond	160,000^{‡}
Canada (Music Canada)	8× Platinum	640,000^{‡}
Denmark (IFPI Danmark)	Platinum	90,000^{‡}
France (SNEP)	Platinum	200,000^{‡}
Germany (BVMI)	Gold	200,000^{‡}
Italy (FIMI)	Platinum	50,000^{‡}
Mexico (AMPROFON)	3× Platinum	180,000^{‡}
New Zealand (RMNZ)	3× Platinum	90,000^{‡}
Norway (IFPI Norway)	Platinum	60,000^{‡}
Poland (ZPAV)	3× Platinum	150,000^{‡}
Portugal (AFP)	Platinum	10,000^{‡}
Spain (Promusicae)	Platinum	60,000^{‡}
United Kingdom (BPI)	2× Platinum	1,200,000^{‡}
United States (RIAA)	3× Platinum	3,000,000^{‡}
Streaming
Sweden (GLF)	2× Platinum	24,000,000^{†}
^{‡} Sales+streaming figures based on certification alone.^{†} Streaming-only figures based on certification alone.

== See also ==
- List of number-one singles of the 2010s (Sweden)
- List of number-one singles and albums in Sweden
- List of top 10 singles in 2019 (Australia)
- List of top 10 singles in 2019 (Ireland)
- List of UK top-ten singles in 2019
