= When the Party's Over (song) =

2018 single by Billie Eilish

Single by Billie Eilish

from the album When We All Fall Asleep, Where Do We Go?
- Released: October 17, 2018
- Genre: Goth-pop
- Length: 3:16
- Label: Darkroom; Interscope
- Songwriter: Finneas O'Connell
- Producer: Finneas O'Connell

Billie Eilish singles chronology
"You Should See Me in a Crown" (2018)	"When the Party's Over" (2018)	"Come Out and Play" (2018)

Music video
- "When the Party's Over" on YouTube

"When the Party's Over" is a song by American singer-songwriter Billie Eilish and the second single from her debut studio album, When We All Fall Asleep, Where Do We Go? (2019). It was released on October 17, 2018, through Darkroom and Interscope Records. It was written and produced by Finneas O'Connell. The song was featured in the Invincible episode "What Have I Done?", along with The Summer I Turned Pretty episode "Summer Tides".

== Background and recording ==
The concept behind "When the Party's Over" was inspired after Finneas O'Connell, Eilish's brother, had left his date's house "kind of for no reason" and was driving home alone late at night, simultaneously unhappy at the end of the relationship but also feeling a sense of safety through a lack of full investment in it. O'Connell later approached Eilish with a draft of the track, and they decided to perform it live a year before it was released, which O'Connell later recalled was "such a terrible idea" as he feared that fans would deem the studio recording inferior to the live version. They consequently set out to "get the magic" of a live performance "into a space where it's still interesting to record," a process which O'Connell described as "really hard" due to the song's delicate nature.

Eilish and O'Connell decided that the track would be "almost entirely" vocal, utilizing only sub-bass and acoustic piano as additional instruments; this made it "super challenging" to keep each measure interesting. The song required approximately 100 vocal tracks, which included the stacking of layers on each part of the harmony as well as "weird processed adlibs," while Eilish recorded over 90 takes of the song's first word "don't" to obtain the right sound. The influence of choral music on the song was informed by the siblings' experience singing in a choir during their childhood, and Eilish disclosed that it was also inspired by the songs "Stand Still" (2017) by Sabrina Claudio, "715 - CRΣΣKS" (2016) by Bon Iver and "Hide and Seek" (2005) by Imogen Heap.

== Composition and lyrics ==
"When the Party's Over" is a bare-bones goth-pop piano ballad that acts as a departure from the electro and R&B beats of her earlier output. Music publications have noted its hymnal-like qualities and use of bass, as well as its minimal instrumentation, which spotlight Eilish's vocal abilities. Rolling Stone editor Ryan Reed highlighted the track's "atmospheric vocal harmonies," use of vocoder and Eilish's use of her high vocal register, while Nicole Engelman of Billboard wrote of the "angelic hums" that accompany the singer, whose voice "[swells] up from a whisper." Chris DeVille of Stereogum compared the song to the work of Imogen Heap and Lana Del Rey. Musicnotes published this song in a 3/4 time signature with a tempo of 124 beats per minute in the key of C♯ minor, with Eilish's vocal range between the notes of E_{3} and E_{5}.

Eilish has described the song as "kind of a sequel" to her single "Party Favor" (2018), documenting when "you're on the phone with someone and you can't hear them, they can't hear you, it's loud, they're mad at you for some reason" and consequently thinking: "You know what? Fucking leave me alone." It discusses the end of a relationship, a common subject matter in the Eilish's previous work, with the singer wishing to be "more than a party of one;" Suzy Exposito of Rolling Stone described it as one of the more sincere songs off her debut album When We All Fall Asleep, Where Do We Go? (2019), while Reed wrote that "each verse [grows] more mournful" as the song progresses It opens with a sample of Eilish's debut single "Ocean Eyes" (2016), which Sean Ward of The Line of Best Fit argued demonstrated an "understanding of her own artistry." No instruments accompany the vocals until the first chorus a minute into the track, where sub-bass is introduced.

== Critical reception ==
"When the Party's Over" was met with critical acclaim. Suzy Exposito of Rolling Stone wrote that the track is one of the moments off When We All Fall Asleep where "Eilish can't help but draw back the curtain [...] and let you in." Similarly, Sputnikmusic reviewer SowingSeason called it one of the "still frame moments when she allows herself to be heard not as the cynical teenage pop star, but rather as Billie the seventeen-year-old girl who's going through all the same things you are;" they also commended her "mesmerizing whispers and hums." Billboard's Nicole Engelman praised the "haunting" song's "sharply insightful" lyrics, which she argued, "demonstrate a maturity well beyond her 16 years of age." Pitchfork editor Stacey Anderson commended the singer's vocal performance, while Grant Rindner of Uproxx considered that the single proved "that she has one of the most arresting voices in pop." Tanis Smither of Earmilk praised the song as "heart-wrenching," writing that it "somehow manages to maintain her brand of ballsy production and delicate, dreamy vocal." The Austin Chronicle's Alejandra Ramirez wrote that the song was one of the moments where Eilish "flips the LP's most archetypal pop moments on their head." Christopher Thiessen listed it as one of the album's standout tracks in his review for Consequence of Sound. Insider placed it at number 4 on their list of Eilish's best songs on March 18, 2020, with Callie Ahlgrim describing it as "perfect blend of Eilish's fluttery, melancholic vocals and O'Connell's empathetic songwriting abilities."

== Music video ==
The music video was released on October 25, 2018. The video starts with a blue-haired Eilish sitting in a white room, before gulping down a cup filled with black liquid. Black tears start flowing down her cheeks, staining her outfit in the process. Towards the end of the video, the camera pans downwards, revealing that the black liquid started to stain the floor. Eilish said her inspiration for the video came from a fan art of a drawing of her with black eyes leaking. "I thought it was visually really dope and I wanted to physically create it." It was directed by Carlos López Estrada.

== Credits and personnel ==
Credits adapted from Tidal.

- Billie Eilish – Lead vocals, backing vocals
- Finneas O'Connell – producer, songwriter, backing vocals, bass, percussion, piano
- John Greenham – mastering engineer, studio personnel
- Rob Kinelski – mixer, studio personnel
- Casey Cuayo – assistant mixer, studio personnel

== Awards and nominations ==
Year	Ceremony	Category	Result	Ref.
2018	GAFFA Awards (Norway)	Best Foreign Song	Nominated	
2019	Clio Awards	Music Videos	Gold	
2019	MTV Video Music Awards	Best Visual Effects	Nominated	
2019	UK Music Video Awards	Best Pop Video – International	Nominated	

== Charts ==
=== Weekly charts ===
Weekly chart performance for "When the Party's Over"
Chart (2018–2020)	Peak position
Australia (ARIA)	7
Austria (Ö3 Austria Top 40)	25
Belgium (Ultratop 50 Flanders)	31
Belgium (Ultratip Bubbling Under Wallonia)	1
Canada Hot 100 (Billboard)	14
Czech Republic Singles Digital (ČNS IFPI)	14
Denmark (Tracklisten)	16
Estonia (Eesti Tipp-40)	7
Finland (Suomen virallinen lista)	17
France (SNEP)	69
Germany (GfK)	45
Greece (IFPI)	8
Hungary (Single Top 40)	24
Hungary (Stream Top 40)	15
Iceland (Tónlistinn)	18
Ireland (IRMA)	7
Italy (FIMI)	84
Latvia (LAIPA)	5
Lithuania (AGATA)	2
Mexico Ingles Airplay (Billboard)	28
Netherlands (Dutch Top 40)	26
Netherlands (Single Top 100)	34
New Zealand (Recorded Music NZ)	3
Norway (VG-lista)	9
Portugal (AFP)	27
Scottish Singles Sales (Official Charts)	56
Singapore (RIAS)	30
Slovakia Singles Digital (ČNS IFPI)	10
Spain (Promusicae)	60
Sweden (Sverigetopplistan)	10
Switzerland (Schweizer Hitparade)	29
UK Singles (Official Charts)	21
US Billboard Hot 100	29
US Pop Airplay (Billboard)	17
US Rolling Stone Top 100	43

2023 weekly chart performance for "When the Party's Over"
Chart (2023)	Peak position
US Hot Rock & Alternative Songs (Billboard)	25

=== Year-end charts ===
2019 year-end chart performance for "When the Party's Over"
Chart (2019)	Position
Australia (ARIA)	29
Belgium (Ultratop Flanders)	86
Canada (Canadian Hot 100)	53
Denmark (Tracklisten)	40
France (SNEP)	191
Hungary (Stream Top 40)	50
Iceland (Tónlistinn)	37
Ireland (IRMA)	28
New Zealand (Recorded Music NZ)	23
Norway (VG-lista)	18
Portugal (AFP)	81
Sweden (Sverigetopplistan)	30
Switzerland (Schweizer Hitparade)	45
UK Singles (Official Charts Company)	74
US Billboard Hot 100	67
US Mainstream Top 40 (Billboard)	47
US Rolling Stone Top 100	41

2020 year-end chart performance for "When the Party's Over"
Chart (2020)	Position
Portugal (AFP)	141

2025 year-end chart performance for "When the Party's Over"
Chart (2025)	Position
Belgium (Ultratop 50 Flanders)	197

== Certifications ==
Certifications for "When the Party's Over"
Region	Certification	Certified units/sales
Australia (ARIA)	11× Platinum	770,000^{‡}
Austria (IFPI Austria)	3× Platinum	90,000^{‡}
Belgium (BRMA)	Platinum	40,000^{‡}
Brazil (Pro-Música Brasil)	3× Diamond	480,000^{‡}
Canada (Music Canada)	9× Platinum	720,000^{‡}
Denmark (IFPI Danmark)	3× Platinum	270,000^{‡}
France (SNEP)	Diamond	333,333^{‡}
Germany (BVMI)	Platinum	400,000^{‡}
Italy (FIMI)	Platinum	50,000^{‡}
New Zealand (RMNZ)	7× Platinum	210,000^{‡}
Norway (IFPI Norway)	3× Platinum	180,000^{‡}
Poland (ZPAV)	4× Platinum	200,000^{‡}
Portugal (AFP)	2× Platinum	20,000^{‡}
Spain (Promusicae)	2× Platinum	120,000^{‡}
United Kingdom (BPI)	3× Platinum	1,800,000^{‡}
United States (RIAA)	4× Platinum	4,000,000^{‡}
Streaming
Sweden (GLF)	3× Platinum	24,000,000^{†}
^{‡} Sales+streaming figures based on certification alone.^{†} Streaming-only figures based on certification alone.

== Release history ==
Release dates and formats for "When the Party's Over"
Region	Date	Format(s)	Label(s)	Ref.
Various	October 17, 2018	Digital download; streaming	Darkroom; Interscope	
United States	February 26, 2019	Contemporary hit radio	Darkroom; Interscope	

== Covers and samples ==
English alternative metal collective Sleep Token covered the song on the deluxe version of their 2019 album Sundowning.

Scottish singer-songwriter Lewis Capaldi recorded a cover for his Spotify Singles EP, and a 2025 EP, All the Rest.

Sibling band BAILEN covered the song on their 2019 album BAILEN Mixtape Vol. 1.

Trinidadian rapper Nicki Minaj sampled the song on her 2023 album Pink Friday 2.

=== Certifications ===
Certifications for "When the Party's Over" (Lewis Capaldi version)
Region	Certification	Certified units/sales
Australia (ARIA)	Gold	35,000^{‡}
New Zealand (RMNZ)	Gold	15,000^{‡}
^{‡} Sales+streaming figures based on certification alone.

== See also ==
- List of highest-certified singles in Australia
