= Guitar Songs =

2022 EP by Billie Eilish

EP by Billie Eilish
- Released: July 21, 2022
- Recorded: 2022
- Length: 8:17
- Labels: Darkroom; Interscope
- Producer: Finneas O'Connell

Billie Eilish chronology
Happier Than Ever (2021)	Guitar Songs (2022)	Hit Me Hard and Soft (2024)

Guitar Songs is the second extended play (EP) (Note: A preponderance of publications call Guitar Songs an EP. A few others, as well as streaming services like Spotify and Apple Music, brand it as a double single. Because more secondary sources refer to the release as an EP, this article will use such categorization.) by American singer-songwriter Billie Eilish. It was released through download and streaming services on July 21, 2022, by Darkroom and Interscope Records. Its release came as a surprise, a decision she made because she wanted to share new music to her fans as soon as she could. The track list contains two songs Eilish considered for inclusion on her third studio album, Hit Me Hard and Soft (2024), but decided not to due to the lyrics' immediacy. She wrote the EP with her brother Finneas O'Connell, who produced both songs.

The two tracks are realist sentimental ballads, a departure from the fantastical themes of When We All Fall Asleep, Where Do We Go? (2019). Each contains personal lyrics that derive from contemporary life events, backed by simple acoustic guitars that emphasize Eilish's soft vocals. Eilish debuted the first track, "TV", during the Manchester concert of her Happier Than Ever, The World Tour (2022–2023). It references the June 2022 overturning of Roe v. Wade, a court decision that devastated her. "The 30th", the other track, was the first song she made after finishing work on Happier Than Ever. Written in December 2021, the song is titled after the day of a friend's near-death car crash—on November 30, 2021.

Music critics praised Guitar Songs for its vocals and songwriting. Many believed that Eilish was able to prove her talent as a songwriter through the EP's lyricism, with occasional praise towards how the production highlighted its vulnerable sentiments. Its tracks entered several national record charts worldwide, including the Billboard Hot 100 in the US. The two reached the top 50 of the Billboard Global 200, as well as the top 40 in four countries. Eilish and O'Connell played "TV" again and "The 30th" for the first time during the world tour's Asian leg, and the two performed them in Singapore in collaboration with its tourism board to promote the country.

== Writing ==
After the release of her second studio album, Happier Than Ever, in July 2021, Billie Eilish and her producer Finneas O'Connell began formulating ideas for songs she wanted to include on her next one by the end of the year. The first song they wrote after Happier Than Ever was "The 30th", titled as a reference to November 30, 2021. On that day, someone close to her nearly died in a car accident, and she described seeing the event firsthand as "the most indescribable thing [she had] to witness and experience". Eilish wrote "The 30th" on December 30, 2021, almost immediately upon recalling the accident on that date, fueled by stream-of-consciousness thoughts about the event. She said in an Apple Music 1 interview with Zane Lowe: "I had been writing down all these thoughts that I was having. I was with Finneas, and I was like, 'I'm sorry, I don't know what you were planning on doing, but we need to write this song about this right now.'"

Beginning February 3, 2022, Eilish and O'Connell embarked on a 2022–2023 world tour in support of Happier Than Ever, dubbed Happier Than Ever, The World Tour. While on tour, Eilish allocated a certain period of time in her schedule for writing music, during which she was busy writing another song, "TV". The process was concurrent with the US Supreme Court's discussion around the Dobbs v. Jackson Women's Health Organization case. This took months; while Eilish was quick to finish the first verse and chorus, she wrote the remaining lyrics only after a draft of the court decision was leaked online, in May 2022. The leaked draft revealed plans to overturn Roe v. Wade, a landmark case which had made abortion a constitutional right in the country. Eilish, who has a track record with political activism, was saddened by the leak, and she felt like her rights as a woman were being stripped away. Weeks after she finished writing "TV", the Supreme Court decided to overturn Roe v. Wade. Eilish bemoaned the decision, speaking in hindsight about the remaining lyrics: "It was a placeholder of doom."

== Release ==
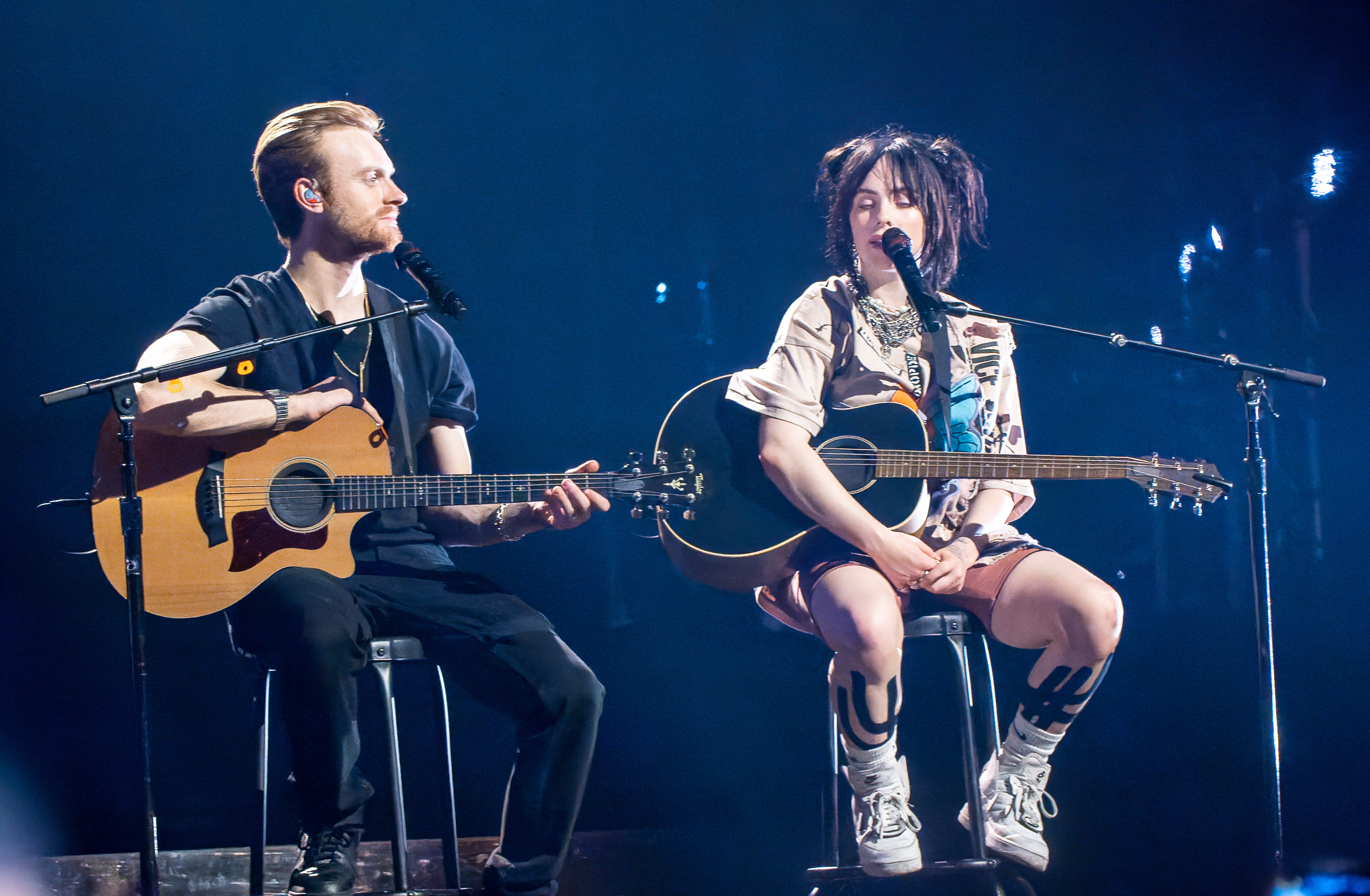
Billie Eilish debuted an unreleased song for the EP during a world tour in support of her second studio album.

During the Manchester concert of Happier Than Ever, The World Tour, on June 7, 2022, Eilish performed "TV" live for the first time. Finneas provided acoustic guitar instrumentation. This marked the first time since around 2017 that she gave a preview of an unreleased song. She was inspired to do it after seeing Harry Styles play "Boyfriends", another then-unreleased song, at the music festival Coachella. Explaining the decision, Eilish said in an NME cover story that she had "missed doing a song that no-one had heard yet" during concert tours from those years. The debut performance, she recalled, made her feel vulnerable, mainly because the song's subject matter was sensitive to her, but also because she considered the act of performing an unreleased song emotionally striking.

By July, "TV" and "The 30th" were the only songs the two had made; they tried to entertain the idea of including them on her third album. Eilish had shelved her voice memos for the songs for several weeks, and upon stumbling across the recordings again, she wanted to share to her fans what their lyrics had to offer as soon as possible. Noting the immediacy of "TV" and "The 30th", she said: "These songs are really current for me, and they're songs that I want to have said right now." After talking to Finneas, she excluded them from the track list, despite announcing plans to start the corresponding recording sessions beforehand. She refused to wait until the release to make the songs officially available to the public.

On July 21, Darkroom and Interscope Records released an extended play (EP), Guitar Songs, through download and streaming formats. It happened without prior announcement. Guitar Songs is Eilish's second EP, consisting of "TV" and "The 30th". Eilish went on Apple Music 1 briefly afterwards; apart from the song's immediacy, she told Lowe another reason she decided on the surprise release was she had grown tired of doing heavy, traditional promotion for upcoming music. She wanted to release songs like she had been doing early in her career—without much marketing, sometimes by previewing it for fans in live concerts. Prior to this, she said: "I just want to be able to go back to my roots and be the songwriter that I am."

"TV" and "The 30th" appeared on the record charts of multiple territories worldwide. Respectively, they debuted at numbers 52 and 79 on the Billboard Hot 100 in the United States. With this, Finneas became the first musician to spend 100 weeks on Billboard Hot 100 Producers, re-entering at number 16 after the release of Guitar Songs. Elsewhere, its tracks entered the top 40 of charts in Ireland, the UK, Iceland, Australia, and New Zealand; "TV" reached the top 40 in five more territories, and it had higher peaks than "The 30th". (Note: See the charts section for a list of the exact peaks) On the Billboard Global 200, "TV" debuted at number 25 and "The 30th" at number 50.

== Music and lyrics ==
Guitar Songs consists of "TV" and "The 30th", two sentimental ballads with minimal production that combines Eilish's soft vocals with an acoustic guitar. Music journalists wrote that the simple composition puts emphasis on the lyrics and the vocal performance, making these the driving qualities of the EP. (Note: Such journalists include ones from Billboard, Uproxx, The Guardian, and Nylon) The production is reminiscent of her and Finneas's oldest works, created when they wanted to make music at their parents' house with nothing but a guitar. Eilish explained their approach: "That's our roots... I wanted to go back and do it how we used to." Meanwhile, Billboard critic Jason Lipshutz described the EP with regards to its sound as follows: it could "either be a gesture toward a new sonic and lyrical direction, or a stopgap between best-selling full-lengths".

"TV" and "The 30th" were co-written by Finneas, who produced both tracks. Laura Snapes for The Guardian, describing the Guitar Songs writing style as realist, notes that the EP marks a departure from the lyrical themes of When We All Fall Asleep, Where Do We Go?; (Note: When We All Fall Asleep, Where Do We Go? features dark themes, both literal and metaphorical. Themes include night terrors, mental health, suicide, and climate change.) whereas the album focused more on horror imagery, the EP's stories are more grounded in real-life experiences. In her words, "TV" and "The 30th" showcase Eilish as she observes the destruction of several things in her life that she values dearly. Its lyrics are heavily personal, inspired primarily by events that happened to Eilish when she made the two songs.

=== "TV" ===
Women are losing rights for their bodies, so why are we talking about celebrities' divorce trials [sic]? Who gives a shit? Let them figure it out on their own. The internet bothers the shit out of me sometimes.

— Eilish during a cover story for NME

"TV", the first on the tracklist, explores the topics of abandonment and a desire for numbness as a distraction from the problems that plague the world. Its poignant subject matters include eating disorders, mental health, the defamation trial between actors Johnny Depp and Amber Heard, and the outcome of the Dobbs case.

The song opens by describing a depressive episode. Unable to sleep, she distracts herself from a falling-out with an ex-partner by watching the reality TV show Survivor, then she expresses disapproval towards the apathy and cynicism of others around her. Eilish sings about "sinking in the sofa while they all betray each other", posing the question "what's the point of anything?" Jon Pareles of The New York Times interpreted the scene as a demonstration of "the ways entertainment nurtures distraction, alienation and apathy".

In the chorus, Eilish discusses the effects of her romantic relationships on the amount of time she can spend with her friends, and by the second verse, Eilish ponders how her friendships have also been affected by her celebrity status. With this, she feels the urge to skip meals but tries to restrain herself. Next, she laments how "the internet's gone wild watching movie stars on trial / While they're overturning Roe v. Wade." Eilish expressed anger about the situation in the NME cover story, questioning why the public prioritized fixating on the feud between Depp and Heard, which she found trivial, instead of showing concern about the future of abortion rights.

The chorus reappears after the second verse, and to close the song, Eilish uses a refrain. She repeats the phrase "maybe I'm the problem", blaming herself for the life issues she has faced while writing "TV". As the song approaches its final lyrics, it plays a sample of a cheering crowd, taken from Eilish's debut performance at Manchester.

=== "The 30th" ===
"The 30th", in the views of Snapes and Tina Benitez-Eves of American Songwriter, is a more personal song compared to "TV". Centered around the November 30 car accident, "The 30th" is dedicated to the friend in question, whom Eilish considered one of her closest, and it details several minutiae that occurred around the event. Death and pain are the song's primary themes.

"The 30th"
Guitar Songs consists of two ballads driven by acoustic guitar that puts emphasis on Eilish's soft vocals. In "The 30th", the guitar in the background crescendos and the vocals become stronger for the bridge, evoking an increasing sense of panic.

Eilish narrates how the friend went unconscious after the crash and remembered what happened to them once they woke up inside a travelling ambulance. One line comments on the scene: "when you're staring into space / It's hard to believe you don't remember it". Then, she sings she was on the same road as the car accident, switching the story towards her point of view. Even though there was a traffic jam and she saw ambulances driving past her, she says she "didn't even think of pulling over"; she fully learnt of her friend's condition the night after. In the chorus, Eilish reminds them that they had a phone conversation during confinement and they expressed their deepest fears about their health—Eilish replied "so was I" and decided to lighten the mood by complimenting their looks. When the song crescendos towards its bridge, the guitar chords slowly build up and the vocals begin to overlap, evoking a racing mind and a growing sense of panic.

In the bridge, Eilish lists alternate scenarios that question if the friend would still be alive had the accident occurred at another day and in other locations—a street with young children, a bridge without a railroad to block any oncoming traffic, or the Angeles Crest Highway during snowfall. She conjures the idea of the friend on a trip to someplace secluded with children in the passenger seats, unable to contact others for help. To close the bridge, she sings "if you changed anything, would you not have survived?" before she repeats the words "you're alive". On the last "you're alive", the vocal layering ends, leaving only Eilish's soft voice. The chorus appears again after the bridge, but this time, Eilish changes the final line "so was I" to "so am I".

August Brown, a writer for the Los Angeles Times, thought that the instrumentation for "The 30th" was reminiscent of the works of George Harrison, guitarist for the Beatles. Consequence's Mary Siroky opted to compare the song, specifically its build-up to the bridge, to the "unforgettable explosion" of Happier Than Ever's title track. To contrast the two, she argued that listeners expect "The 30th" to provide catharsis in a similar way as the title track, but it instead "pulls back, leaving us gasping for air". She also highlighted the bridge for its vivid narrative details.

== Critical reception ==
Many critics praised the tracks in Guitar Songs for their self-reflection and social commentary, some of whom considered it a testament to her writing abilities. (Note: Attributed to Nylon, Consequence, Billboard, Entertainment Tonight Canada, and the Manila Bulletin) Snapes said by using specific narrative details with "great subtlety" and discussing poignant themes without downplaying their seriousness, Eilish succeeded with creating effectively tragic stories for the EP. Entertainment columnists for the Manila Bulletin argued that these, alongside the song's confessional nature, made Eilish on par with "all the greatest songwriters" before her and served as a reminder she is one of her generation's "most treasured" ones.

Other music journalists focused on the EP's production. Two critics praised her vocals. Steffanee Wang, from Nylon, said it was "powerful", and the other, Lipshutz, said it was "increasingly confident". Lipshutz found the guitar subtle and relaxing in nature, and a similar sentiment was shared by an NME author, who wrote: "She sings over lulling acoustic guitars meant to soothe the most disillusioned of us." Snapes liked that the melody and Eilish's vocals were, to her, appropriate for the song's tone: "Fittingly, the melody of each line seems to tumble, each one a crumbling empire delivered in her tremulous, feather-light voice." Meanwhile, when two critics for the British edition of GQ called "TV" one of the best songs of 2022, they cited its use of the "spine-chilling" audience sample, which allowed it to form a "devastating stunner".

The tracks' personal, pensive nature led some to brand them with distinctive accolades. With "TV", The Guardian music journalist Alexis Petridis wrote that its melancholic tone made it a noteworthy addition to the Manchester concert's set list; he considered it the best one she performed there. On the other hand, "The 30th" was selected by Consequence as the best new song for the week coinciding with the release of Guitar Songs, with praised focused on its "balance of vulnerability, specificity, and utter relatability" that they believed was the reason for Eilish's trans-generational appeal. The publication wrote, "It's [...] the kind of unexpected quirk that keeps Eilish separated from so many of her other dark-pop cohorts." Benitez-Eves listed the song among ten of Eilish's best in an American Songwriter article published in February 2023.

== Live performances ==
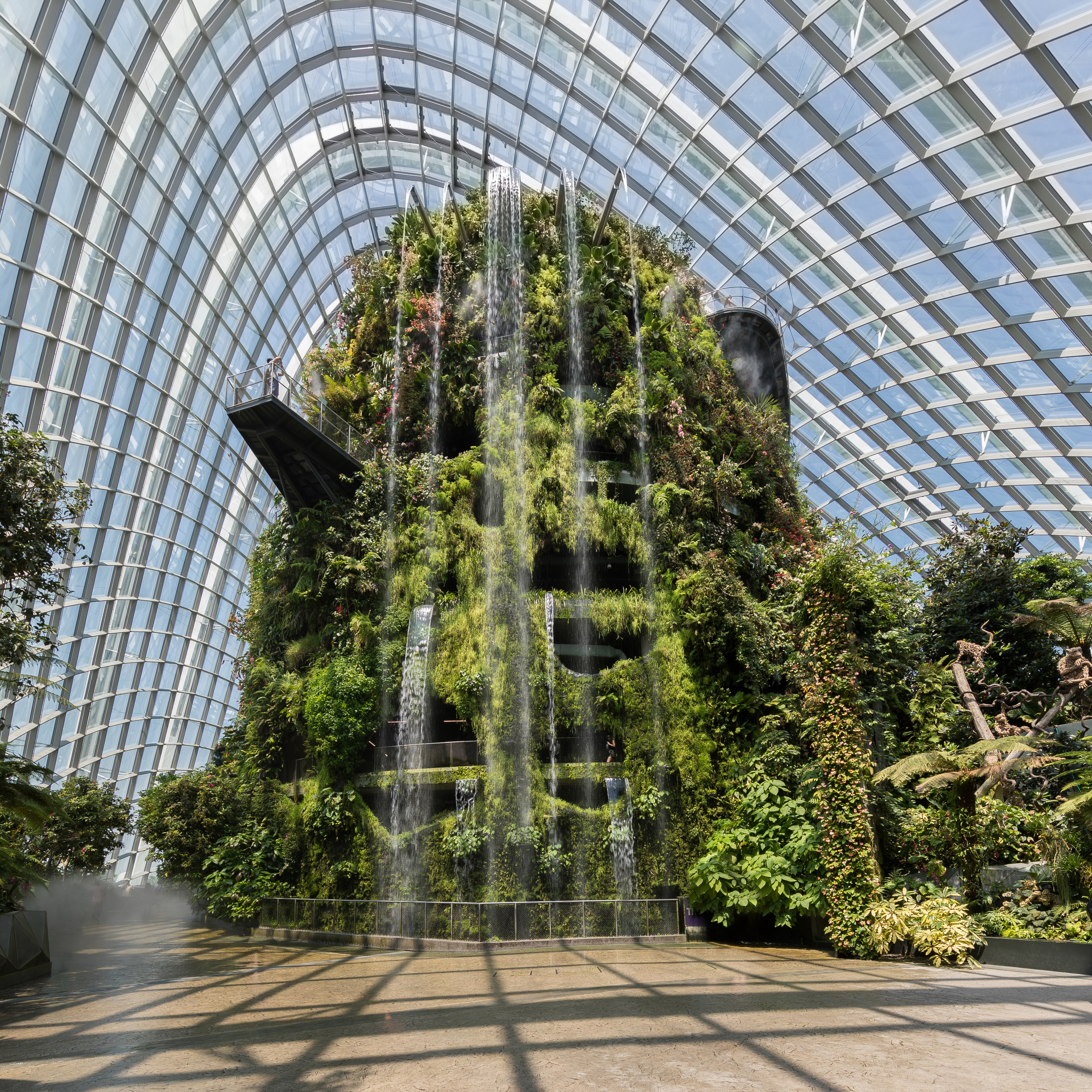
As part of a campaign by Singapore's tourism board to attract international travel towards the country, Eilish filmed a live performance of Guitar Songs in Gardens by the Bay.

After the surprise live performance of "TV", Eilish and Finneas continued to include it in set lists for select dates of Happier Than Ever, The World Tour in 2022, such as the one for the Singapore concert on August 21. During the tour's Manila stop on August 13, the two did a live rendition of "The 30th" for the first time. Eilish struggled with performing the song due to the personal lyrics, saying: "It's out but we've never done it live before. Please bear with me, it's a very hard song to sing, so I'm gonna try my best. This song is dedicated to my dear, dear friend, that's all I'm gonna be saying." "TV" was also featured in the set list of Eilish's 2024–2025 tour, Hit Me Hard and Soft: The Tour.

Eilish and Finneas have performed "TV" and "The 30th" outside of concert tours. Nine days after the release of Guitar Songs, the two visited the Amoeba Music record store in Hollywood to play "TV" along with three other songs. This was done in commemoration of Happier Than Ever's one-year anniversary. On September 21, 2022, live performances of the two tracks were shared to Eilish's YouTube account in collaboration with Singapore's tourism board. Recorded at the Cloud Forest of the Gardens by the Bay, the performances were part of a campaign to boost international travel to Singapore following the onset of the COVID-19 pandemic in 2020.

== Track listing ==
All tracks are written by Billie Eilish and Finneas O'Connell, and produced by Finneas.

No.	Title	Length
1.	"TV"	4:41
2.	"The 30th"	3:36
Total length:		8:17

== Personnel ==
Credits adapted from Tidal.

- Billie Eilish – vocals, songwriting, engineering, vocal editing
- Finneas O'Connell – songwriting, production, engineering, vocal editing, bass, drums, guitar, piano, programming, synthesizer
- Dave Kutch – mastering
- Rob Kinelski – mixing
- Eli Heisler – assistant mixing

== Charts ==
Guitar Songs did not appear in any album charts, so this section will show how its two tracks performed commercially.

=== Weekly charts ===
Weekly chart performance for "TV" and "The 30th"
Chart (2022)	Peak chart position	
Chart (2022)	"TV"	"The 30th"
Australia (ARIA)	23	31
Canada (Canadian Hot 100)	30	48
France (SNEP)	173	—
Germany (Official German Charts)	81	—
Global 200 (Billboard)	25	50
Greece International (IFPI)	19	56
Iceland (Tónlistinn)	15	24
Ireland (IRMA)	17	20
Japan Hot Overseas (Billboard Japan)	16	—
Lithuania (AGATA)	26	70
Malaysia International (RIM)	17	—
Netherlands (Single Top 100)	78	100
New Zealand (Recorded Music NZ)	17	22
Norway (VG-lista)	33	—
Portugal (AFP)	54	94
South Africa (TOSAC)	63	—
Sweden (Sverigetopplistan)	22	— (Note: "The 30th" did not enter the Swedish Singellista Chart but peaked at number three on the Swedish Heatseeker Chart.)
Switzerland (Schweizer Hitparade)	33	88
UK Singles (OCC)	23	33
US Billboard Hot 100	52	79
US Digital Song Sales	14	19
US Hot Rock & Alternative Songs (Billboard)	7	11
Vietnam (Vietnam Hot 100)	54	—

=== Year-end charts ===
Year-end chart performance for "TV" and "The 30th"
Chart (2022)	Position	
Chart (2022)	"TV"	"The 30th"
US Hot Rock & Alternative Songs (Billboard)	36	66

Year-end chart performance for "TV"
Chart (2023)	Position
US Hot Rock & Alternative Songs (Billboard)	59

== Certifications ==
Certifications and sales for "TV"
Region	Certification	Certified units/sales
Australia (ARIA)	Platinum	70,000^{‡}
Austria (IFPI Austria)	Gold	15,000^{‡}
Brazil (Pro-Música Brasil)	Diamond	160,000^{‡}
Canada (Music Canada)	3× Platinum	240,000^{‡}
Denmark (IFPI Danmark)	Gold	45,000^{‡}
France (SNEP)	Gold	100,000^{‡}
New Zealand (RMNZ)	2× Platinum	60,000^{‡}
Poland (ZPAV)	Gold	25,000^{‡}
Spain (Promusicae)	Gold	30,000^{‡}
United Kingdom (BPI)	Platinum	600,000^{‡}
^{‡} Sales+streaming figures based on certification alone.

Certifications and sales for "The 30th"
Region	Certification	Certified units/sales
Australia (ARIA)	Gold	35,000^{‡}
Brazil (Pro-Música Brasil)	Gold	20,000^{‡}
Canada (Music Canada)	Platinum	80,000^{‡}
New Zealand (RMNZ)	Gold	15,000^{‡}
United Kingdom (BPI)	Silver	200,000^{‡}
^{‡} Sales+streaming figures based on certification alone.
