= Hit Me Hard and Soft: The Tour =

2024–25 concert tour by Billie Eilish

- Tour by Billie Eilish
- Promotional poster
- Location: Asia; Europe; North America; Oceania
- Associated album: Hit Me Hard and Soft
- Start date: September 29, 2024
- End date: November 23, 2025
- No. of shows: 106
- Supporting acts: Nat & Alex Wolff; Towa Bird; The Marías; Ashnikko; Finneas; Tom Odell; Magdalena Bay; Syd; Lola Young; Yoasobi; Fujii Kaze; Men I Trust; Young Miko; Lucy Dacus
- Attendance: 1.51 million (88 shows)
- Box office: $226.1 million (88 shows)
- Website: billieeilish.com

Billie Eilish concert chronology
- Happier Than Ever, The World Tour (2022–2023); Hit Me Hard and Soft: The Tour (2024–2025)

Hit Me Hard and Soft: The Tour was the seventh headlining concert tour by American singer-songwriter Billie Eilish, in support of her third studio album Hit Me Hard and Soft (2024). The tour, which was announced on April 29, 2024, started on September 29, 2024, at the Videotron Centre in Quebec City, and concluded on November 23, 2025, at Chase Center in San Francisco. Nat & Alex Wolff, Towa Bird, The Marías, Young Miko, Ashnikko, Finneas, Tom Odell, Lola Young, Syd, Magdalena Bay, Yoasobi, Fujii Kaze, and Men I Trust performed as supporting acts.

An accompanying 3D concert film, documenting the Manchester shows and co-directed by Eilish and James Cameron, was theatrically released by Paramount Pictures on May 8, 2026. A live album, Hit Me Hard and Soft: The Tour (Live), was released the same month, similarly featuring performances from Manchester.

== Background and development ==
Billie Eilish announced the release of her third studio album, Hit Me Hard and Soft, on April 8, 2024. On April 29, a few weeks before the album's release, she announced the dates for Hit Me Hard and Soft: The Tour. The announcement was followed by a tour trailer posted on her official YouTube account consisting of a compilation of videos from her previous concerts and a teaser of the song "Lunch", which she previously teased at Coachella. She announced 81 dates across North America, Oceania, and Europe. On September 30, she announced two additional dates for Inglewood to be held on December 20 and 21 at the Kia Forum, bringing the total to five shows at the venue. On May 19, 2025, Eilish announced two shows in Japan and a second North American leg.

== Ticketing ==
Tickets for the tour were sold primarily by Ticketmaster and the sales for the US leg started on April 30, 2024, with a pre-sale for American Express Card Members only. There were some additional pre-sales throughout the week, with remaining tickets sold during the general sale, which began on May 3.

To prevent ticket scalping, Eilish used Ticketmaster's Face Value Exchange, where those who purchased tickets could only resell their ticket for the same price they initially paid. Eilish also chose to make the tickets mobile only and restricted from transfer. To further support fair access, ticket delivery was delayed until two weeks prior to the date of the concert.

== Staging and production ==
Hit Me Hard and Soft: The Tour featured a highly immersive 360º stage design, allowing Eilish to connect with the audience from all angles and creating a consistently intimate atmosphere despite the arena scale. The stage design included an enormous LED floor that acted as a constantly changing visual surface, synchronized with the music and lighting design. It also featured two sunken band pits, eight multimedia towers positioned around the arena, and massive overhead screens that shifted and transformed during the performance, shaping the visual identity of each song.

A floating platform and a luminescent LED cube suspended above the stage further expanded the vertical dimension of the production, functioning as a central visual element that displayed dynamic imagery and abstract visuals. The show also featured a B-stage, located at the corner of the arena, where Eilish performed some songs, strengthening the sense of unpredictability and closeness with the audience.

== Concert synopsis ==
The show had an approximate duration of one hour and thirty minutes. It begins with all arena lights turned off, with only the LED cube in the center of the stage remaining illuminated. An instrumental track starts playing, containing a portion of the lyrics and melody of "The Greatest". The cube is gradually lifted until Eilish appears on top of it. She then opens the show with "Chihiro", singing part of the song on top of the cube before descending to perform the remaining section on the main stage. The next track is "Lunch", during which Eilish runs across the entire stage, giving attention to all sides of the arena. She then performs "NDA" and "Therefore I Am".

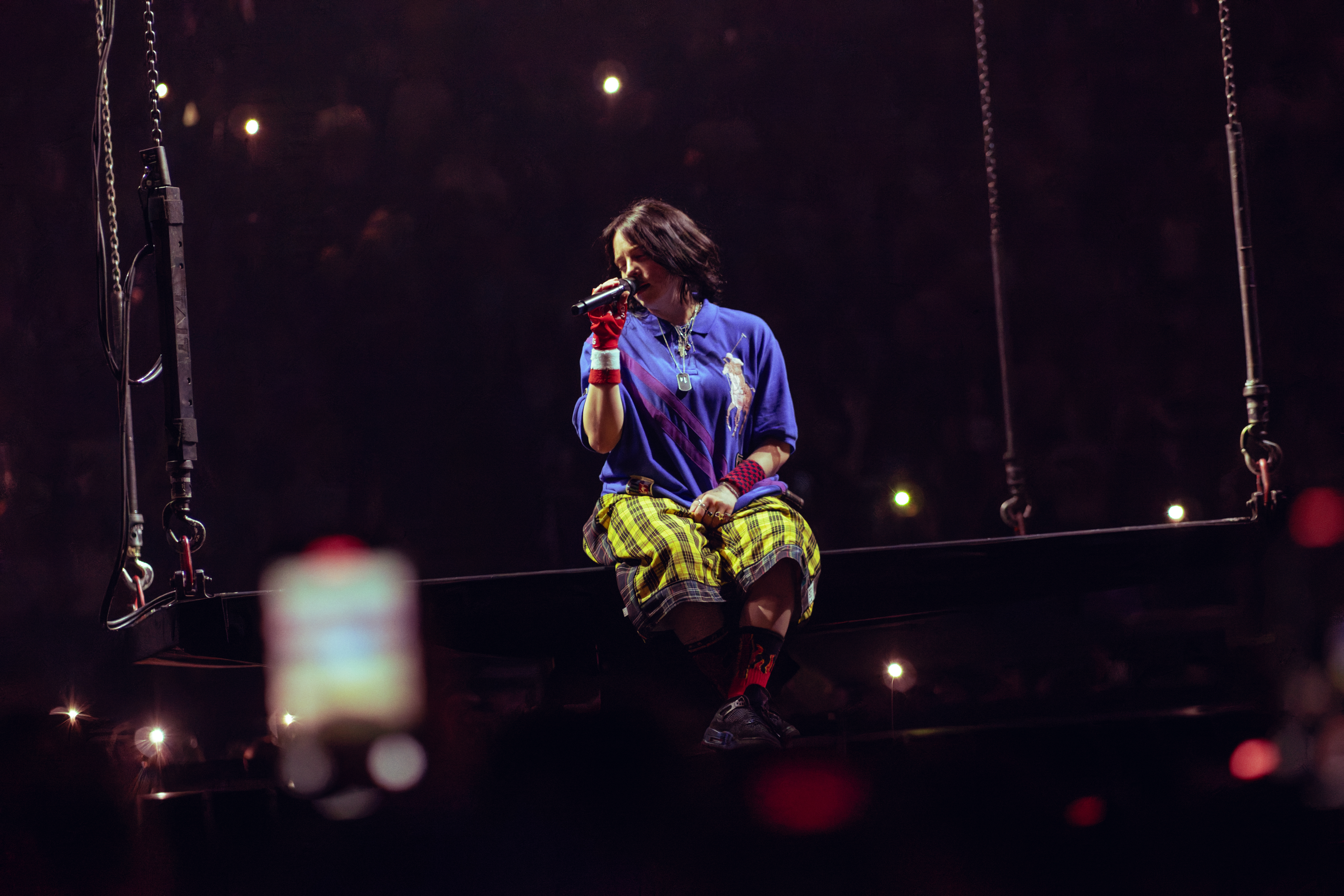
Eilish performing "The Greatest" at the O_{2} Arena in London on July 14, 2025

Eilish takes a short break to speak with the audience and then continues with "Wildflower", keeping the performance focused at the center of the stage. Afterward, she pauses again to talk to the fans and asks them to remain silent for the next song, "When the Party's Over". She sits on the stage floor and begins the song a cappella, looping her own vocals to build harmonies. Eilish continues the show with "The Diner", followed by "Ilomilo". "Bad Guy" comes next, during which she once again moves and runs across the entire stage while filming her band members and herself using a vlog-style camera that projects live footage onto the screens. In "The Greatest", Eilish performs the entire song on a suspended platform in the middle of the stage.

She then begins the most acoustic section of the show, performing seated at the center of the stage alongside her backing vocalists and longtime best friends, Jane and Ava Horner. With a guitar in hand, she sings and plays "Your Power" (during early shows she performed "Male Fantasy" instead). She then performs "Skinny", followed by "TV", again playing the guitar while standing up. A short interlude featuring a segment of "Bittersuite" follows, leading into "Bury a Friend" and then "Oxytocin". During the beginning of "Guess", Eilish disappears from the main stage and reappears on the B-stage, being launched up into the air. Still on the B-stage, she performs "Everything I Wanted", again taking the vlog-style camera and filming fans while moving down from the stage into the crowd.

Eilish returns to the main stage, where she performs shortened piano versions of "Lovely", "Idontwannabeyouanymore", and "Ocean Eyes". The next track is "L'Amour de Ma Vie" and its extended edit, "Over Now". She performs the second part of the song on a suspended platform above the stage. She pauses once again to speak with the fans and introduces her band members, thanking everyone involved in the making of the tour as well as the audience. "What Was I Made For?" follows, with Eilish sitting at the edge of the stage and interacting with fans. She then performs a shortened version of "Happier Than Ever", playing the rock section on electric guitar. The last song is "Birds of a Feather", during which confetti falls over the audience. Eilish says goodbye to the fans as the instrumental outro of "Blue" plays in the background. She then descends from the stage, picks up the vlog-style camera and films herself running through the crowd toward the backstage.

== Critical reception ==
The tour was received with rave reviews from critics. Lindsay Zoladz of The New York Times praised Eilish's ability to bring the intimacy of her songs to the arena stage, noting her "suddenly transforming acoustic numbers into arena-rocking power ballads and playing the adoring audience like a well-tuned instrument". Melissa Ruggieri of USA Today pointed to Eilish's authenticity with her audience, saying that "There is no artifice to her. No questioning her level of sincerity when she tells fans at the end of the show, 'I will always cherish you ... I will always fight for you.'"

Writing for The Guardian, Rob LeDonne complimented Eilish's ability to connect with the audience, calling her "the master of playful confidence, a quality on full display". Kyle Denis from Billboard highlighted the fact that Eilish plays multiple instruments throughout the show, showcasing her ability on piano, acoustic guitar and electric guitar: "From writing to acting, the world has been getting familiar with Billie's countless talents for years — but seeing her flaunt most of them in one setting never gets old." For Variety, Chris Willman called Eilish "a special gift ... to the pop landscape", complimenting her vocals during the show and noting that she became "one of pop's best vocalists".

Brendan Hay of Spin wrote that every element of the show "highlighted her unique ability to blend pulse-pounding beats with gentle vocals for a vibe I can only describe as 'grandly intimate'". Deadline's Anthony D'Alessandro said that the show has a lot of standout moments, noting that Eilish's "performance wattage is what's bedazzling in how she can take the singles from her recent chill, self-reflective album Hit Me Hard and Soft and turn them up onstage to 11 (in Spinal Tap volume speak), whether it's bass or belting". Nui Te Koha from the Herald Sun in Melbourne said that Eilish "redefined the meaning of a truly spectacular arena concert. She is a siren of the times, a natural performer, and deeply cares about her fans." The writer added that "for all the bells and whistles, and there were many, the show always tapped into the essence of a singer-songwriter who crafted, and recorded, significant pop masterpieces in her bedroom and became a global megastar".

The European leg of the tour received rave reviews from critics. Annabel Nugent from The Independent gave four stars out of five and wrote that "Professional though she is ... Eilish still manages to feel spontaneous. What she lacks in back-up dancers and choreography, she makes up for in pure, Duracell bunny energy." Rob Meyers from Clash called Eilish "an enigma; a screen first child of her generation" and "a true talent with the voice of an angel, building a legacy one wounded confessional at a time". Katie Hawthorne from The Guardian also gave four stars out of five and called Eilish "pop's sharpest commentator" as she "plays with fame's power dynamics" and "balances intimacy and spectacle, filming her screaming fans as she paces a stage akin to a boxing ring". Hawthorne added that "Eilish is the rare pop star just as interested in watching her audience perform, and it feels both intimate and combative to be looked at like that". Thomas Turner from The Line of Best Fit called Eilish the "forerunner" of Gen Z, writing that she "has always had a symbiotic relationship with the zeitgeist and pushed forward the envelope of pop culture". Turner also noted the amount of care put into the show, calling her a "gladiator on display, hurtling between all vantage points to allow everyone in attendance a near front row seat".

== Commercial performance ==
At Sydney's Qudos Bank Arena, Hit Me Hard and Soft: The Tour broke the 18-year-old single event attendance record previously set by Justin Timberlake's FutureSex/LoveShow. The new record set on February 28, 2025, boasted 21,001 attendees, surpassing the previous mark of 20,839 held by Timberlake for the November 13, 2007, show. Three of the four dates broke the previous arena attendance record. At Prague's O_{2} Arena, the tour broke the seven-year-old single event attendance record previously set by Metallica's WorldWired Tour. The new record set on June 1, 2025, generated 20,209 attendees, surpassing the previous mark of 20,174 held by the band for the April 2, 2018, show.

In 2025, Forbes listed Eilish as the 16th-highest-paid musician, grossing an estimated $190 million from 70 shows during the year. She was the youngest member of the year's top earners' club.

== Documentation ==
A concert film documenting the tour's Manchester shows, titled Billie Eilish – Hit Me Hard and Soft: The Tour (Live in 3D), was first teased in July 2025 and later set for theatrical release by Paramount Pictures in November. Released on May 8, 2026, it was co-directed and co-produced by Eilish and Canadian filmmaker James Cameron. Parallel to the release of the film, Eilish also announced a limited edition vinyl of Hit Me Hard and Soft: The Tour (Live) on April 16, featuring all the songs performed on the tour's set list. Eilish released the tour's intro track on streaming platforms on April 24, and the album arrived on May 1.

== Activism and impact ==
=== Political statements ===
During the concert in Atlanta on November 3, 2024, two days before the United States presidential election, Eilish encouraged the audience to support Democratic nominee Kamala Harris, saying that "a lot is at stake". At her following concert in Nashville on November 6, one day after Republican nominee Donald Trump won the election, Eilish said that she had considered canceling the show because of the outcome, but she decided that "the people that need this show are the people that are here". Before performing "Your Power", she described Trump as "someone who hates women so, so deeply" and dedicated the song to "all the women out there. I love you, I support you." She also performed a cover of "Yesterday" by the Beatles.

=== Environmental sustainability ===
Hit Me Hard and Soft: The Tour expanded Eilish's partnership with nonprofit organizations Reverb and Support+Feed to promote environmental sustainability through a series of initiatives aimed at reducing the tour's ecological footprint. Measures included Eco-Action Villages at every venue, including the O_{2} Arena in London—where fans could learn about taking action on global warming and watch a pre-recorded short film narrated by Eilish—and Co-op Live in Manchester. There were also free water refill stations, reduced use of single-use plastics, sustainable merchandise, promotion of public transportation, and expanded plant-based food options for audiences and crew. According to Reverb, the tour generated more than 215,000 fan actions supporting environmental causes, eliminated over 135,000 plastic bottles and 1 million disposable cups, and delivered the equivalent of 7.7 million plant-based meals.

In partnership with Support+Feed and Reverb, Eilish organized Overheated, an environmental activism event that was previously held in London in 2022 and 2023. The 2024 edition expanded the initiative internationally with a major event on November 3 at the State Farm Arena in Atlanta, bringing together climate activists, experts, and organizations to discuss climate change, sustainable food systems, and environmental justice. The event was livestreamed globally via Eilish's official YouTube channel, allowing remote audiences to watch the full program in real time. The project expanded in 2025 with two additional editions held in Berlin at Festsaal Kreuzberg on May 9 and in London at the O_{2} on July 14, both also livestreamed on YouTube and featuring panel discussions, workshops, a Community Village, and activists focused on sustainable fashion and environmental action, continuing the aim of promoting climate awareness and community engagement through education and collaboration.

In April 2025, Pollstar announced the creation of the "Billie Eilish Award for Sustainability" in recognition of her leadership in promoting sustainable practices across touring, merchandising, physical music releases, and other aspects of the music industry. In October 2025, during The Wall Street Journal's Innovator Awards, where she received the Music Innovator Award, Eilish announced that US$11.5 million of the tour's earnings were donated to organizations supporting food equity, climate justice, and carbon reduction. During her speech, she encouraged the billionaires in the room to also donate their money. Her remarks, particularly "If you're a billionaire, why are you a billionaire?", garnered controversy. In 2026, National Geographic described the tour as a model for sustainable live events, highlighting its emphasis on operational changes and audience engagement rather than relying primarily on carbon offsetting.

== Accolades ==
Awards and nominations for Hit Me Hard and Soft: The Tour
Year	Award	Category	Result	Ref.
2025	iHeartRadio Music Awards	Favorite Tour Style	Nominated	
2025	iHeartRadio Music Awards	Favorite Tour Photographer (Note: Henry Hwu)	Nominated	
2025	Pollstar Awards	Pop Tour of the Year	Won	
2025	American Music Awards	Favorite Touring Artist	Won	
2025	Excellence In Concessions Awards	Best Sustainability Initiative	Won	
2026	iHeartRadio Music Awards	Favorite Tour Style	Nominated	
2026	iHeartRadio Music Awards	Favorite Tour Photographer	Nominated	
2026	iHeartRadio Music Awards	Favorite Tour Tradition (Note: "When the Party's Over" silent loop)	Nominated	
2026	Pollstar Awards	Major Tour of the Year	Nominated	
2026	Pollstar Awards	Pop Tour of the Year	Nominated	
2026	Pollstar Awards	Road Warrior of the Year (Note: Nicole Massey)	Nominated	
2026	Ticketmaster Awards (Italy)	Best Production Design	Nominated	
2026	Ticketmaster Awards (Spain)	Best Tour of the Year	Nominated	

== Set list ==
This set list is from the September 29, 2024, concert in Quebec City. It does not represent all concerts for the duration of the tour.

1. "Chihiro"
2. "Lunch"
3. "NDA"
4. "Therefore I Am"
5. "Wildflower"
6. "When the Party's Over"
7. "The Diner"
8. "Ilomilo"
9. "Bad Guy"
10. "The Greatest"
11. "Male Fantasy"
12. "Skinny"
13. "TV"
14. "Bury a Friend"
15. "Oxytocin"
16. "You Should See Me in a Crown"
17. "Guess"
18. "Everything I Wanted"
19. "Blue"
20. "Lovely" / "Idontwannabeyouanymore" / "Ocean Eyes"
21. "L'Amour de Ma Vie" / "Over Now" (extended edit)
22. "What Was I Made For?"
23. "Happier Than Ever"
24. "Birds of a Feather"

=== Notes ===
- Starting with the show in Boston, "You Should See Me in a Crown" was removed from the set list.
- During the last show in New York City, "Male Fantasy" was replaced with "I Love You".
- Starting with the show in Nashville, "Male Fantasy" was removed from the set list and replaced with "Your Power". Eilish covered the Beatles' "Yesterday" in place of "Skinny".
- During the first show in Inglewood, Eilish covered "I'll Be Home for Christmas".
- During the second and fifth shows in Inglewood, Eilish sang "Bored". On the second show, she covered "Have Yourself a Merry Little Christmas". On the fifth show, she covered "O Holy Night".
- During the third show in Inglewood, Eilish brought out Charli XCX to sing "Guess". Eilish also covered "Silver Bells".
- During the fourth show in Inglewood, Eilish sang "I Love You" in place of "Your Power" and covered "Silent Night".
- Starting with the first show in Brisbane, "Idontwannabeyouanymore" was removed from the set list and replaced with "Blue" ("Born Blue" version).
- During the first and second shows in Amsterdam, Eilish covered "Creep" by Radiohead.
- During the show in Berlin, Eilish covered "Fix You" by Coldplay.
- Starting with the second show in Cologne, "Halley's Comet" was added to the set list in place of "TV".
- During the show in Prague and the second show in Kraków, Eilish covered "Somewhere Only We Know" by Keane.
- During the first show in Paris, Eilish covered "The Only Exception" by Paramore. On the second show, she covered "Michelle" by the Beatles.
- During the third and fourth shows in London, Eilish covered "Moon River" by Henry Mancini.
- During the second show in Philadelphia, Eilish covered "I'm in the Mood for Love" by Jimmy McHugh and Dorothy Fields.
- During the second shows in Raleigh and Elmont, Eilish covered "I Fall in Love Too Easily" by Jule Styne and Sammy Cahn.
- During the first show in Austin, Eilish covered "Cry Me a River" by Arthur Hamilton.
- During the first show in San Francisco, Eilish covered "Another Love" by Tom Odell.

== Tour dates ==
List of 2024 concerts, showing date, city, country, venue, opening acts, attendance, and gross revenue
Date (2024)	City	Country	Venue	Opening act(s)	Attendance	Revenue
September 29	Quebec City	Canada	Videotron Centre	Nat & Alex Wolff	17,931 / 17,931	$2,475,992
October 1	Toronto	Canada	Scotiabank Arena	Nat & Alex Wolff	35,271 / 35,271	$5,349,324
October 2	Toronto	Canada	Scotiabank Arena	Nat & Alex Wolff	35,271 / 35,271	$5,349,324
October 4	Baltimore	United States	CFG Bank Arena	Nat & Alex Wolff	14,250 / 14,250	$2,484,677
October 5	Philadelphia	United States	Wells Fargo Center	Nat & Alex Wolff	18,236 / 18,236	$3,376,805
October 7	Detroit	United States	Little Caesars Arena	Nat & Alex Wolff	18,060 / 18,060	$2,887,485
October 9	Newark	United States	Prudential Center	Nat & Alex Wolff	17,106 / 17,106	$3,094,655
October 11	Boston	United States	TD Garden	Nat & Alex Wolff	16,057 / 16,057	$2,907,737
October 13	Pittsburgh	United States	PPG Paints Arena	Nat & Alex Wolff	17,934 / 17,934	$2,805,523
October 16	New York City	United States	Madison Square Garden	Nat & Alex Wolff	54,866 / 54,866	$9,498,638
October 17	New York City	United States	Madison Square Garden	Nat & Alex Wolff	54,866 / 54,866	$9,498,638
October 18	New York City	United States	Madison Square Garden	Nat & Alex Wolff	54,866 / 54,866	$9,498,638
November 2	Atlanta	United States	State Farm Arena	Towa Bird	33,936 / 33,936	$5,338,546
November 3	Atlanta	United States	State Farm Arena	Towa Bird	33,936 / 33,936	$5,338,546
November 6	Nashville	United States	Bridgestone Arena	Towa Bird	16,897 / 16,897	$2,824,541
November 8	Cincinnati	United States	Heritage Bank Center	Towa Bird	16,941 / 16,941	$2,680,660
November 10	Saint Paul	United States	Xcel Energy Center	Towa Bird	35,547 / 35,547	$5,888,989
November 11	Saint Paul	United States	Xcel Energy Center	Towa Bird	35,547 / 35,547	$5,888,989
November 13	Chicago	United States	United Center	Nat & Alex Wolff	36,295 / 36,295	$6,284,841
November 14	Chicago	United States	United Center	Nat & Alex Wolff	36,295 / 36,295	$6,284,841
November 16	Kansas City	United States	T-Mobile Center	Nat & Alex Wolff	17,231 / 17,231	$2,742,517
November 17	Omaha	United States	CHI Health Center	Nat & Alex Wolff	14,926 / 14,926	$2,752,120
November 19	Denver	United States	Ball Arena	Nat & Alex Wolff	33,691 / 33,691	$5,670,178
November 20	Denver	United States	Ball Arena	Nat & Alex Wolff	33,691 / 33,691	$5,670,178
December 3	Vancouver	Canada	Rogers Arena	The Marías	17,228 / 17,228	$2,492,298
December 5	Seattle	United States	Climate Pledge Arena	The Marías	32,402 / 32,402	$5,736,051
December 6	Seattle	United States	Climate Pledge Arena	The Marías	32,402 / 32,402	$5,736,051
December 8	Portland	United States	Moda Center	The Marías	16,938 / 16,938	$2,749,017
December 10	San Jose	United States	SAP Center	The Marías	33,678 / 33,678	$5,611,600
December 11	San Jose	United States	SAP Center	The Marías	33,678 / 33,678	$5,611,600
December 13	Glendale	United States	Desert Diamond Arena	The Marías	17,356 / 17,356	$2,847,233
December 15	Inglewood (Note: Labeled as Los Angeles in promotional material)	United States	Kia Forum	The Marías	83,909 / 83,909	$15,387,674
December 16	Inglewood	United States	Kia Forum	Towa Bird	83,909 / 83,909	$15,387,674
December 17	Inglewood	United States	Kia Forum	Nat & Alex Wolff	83,909 / 83,909	$15,387,674
December 20	Inglewood	United States	Kia Forum	Ashnikko	83,909 / 83,909	$15,387,674
December 21	Inglewood	United States	Kia Forum	Finneas	83,909 / 83,909	$15,387,674

List of 2025 concerts, showing date, city, country, venue, opening acts, attendance, and gross revenue
Date (2025)	City	Country	Venue	Opening act(s)	Attendance	Revenue
February 18	Brisbane	Australia	Brisbane Entertainment Centre	Ashnikko	55,108 / 55,108	$6,705,829
February 19	Brisbane	Australia	Brisbane Entertainment Centre	Ashnikko	55,108 / 55,108	$6,705,829
February 21	Brisbane	Australia	Brisbane Entertainment Centre	Ashnikko	55,108 / 55,108	$6,705,829
February 22	Brisbane	Australia	Brisbane Entertainment Centre	Ashnikko	55,108 / 55,108	$6,705,829
February 24	Sydney	Australia	Qudos Bank Arena	Ashnikko	79,314 / 79,314	$9,644,744
February 25	Sydney	Australia	Qudos Bank Arena	Ashnikko	79,314 / 79,314	$9,644,744
February 27	Sydney	Australia	Qudos Bank Arena	Ashnikko	79,314 / 79,314	$9,644,744
February 28	Sydney	Australia	Qudos Bank Arena	Ashnikko	79,314 / 79,314	$9,644,744
March 4	Melbourne	Australia	Rod Laver Arena	Ashnikko	69,957 / 69,957	$8,274,935
March 5	Melbourne	Australia	Rod Laver Arena	Ashnikko	69,957 / 69,957	$8,274,935
March 7	Melbourne	Australia	Rod Laver Arena	Ashnikko	69,957 / 69,957	$8,274,935
March 8	Melbourne	Australia	Rod Laver Arena	Ashnikko	69,957 / 69,957	$8,274,935
April 23	Stockholm	Sweden	Avicii Arena	Tom Odell	30,483 / 30,483	$3,585,691
April 24	Stockholm	Sweden	Avicii Arena	Tom Odell	30,483 / 30,483	$3,585,691
April 26	Bærum (Note: Labeled as Oslo in promotional material)	Norway	Unity Arena	Tom Odell	25,293 / 25,293	$3,061,896
April 28	Copenhagen	Denmark	Royal Arena	Tom Odell	31,050 / 31,050	$3,926,559
April 29	Copenhagen	Denmark	Royal Arena	Tom Odell	31,050 / 31,050	$3,926,559
May 2	Hanover	Germany	ZAG-Arena	Tom Odell	14,692 / 14,692	$1,702,077
May 4	Amsterdam	Netherlands	Ziggo Dome	Tom Odell	50,082 / 50,082	$6,106,814
May 5	Amsterdam	Netherlands	Ziggo Dome	Tom Odell	50,082 / 50,082	$6,106,814
May 7	Amsterdam	Netherlands	Ziggo Dome	Tom Odell	50,082 / 50,082	$6,106,814
May 9	Berlin	Germany	Uber Arena	Tom Odell	16,539 / 16,539	$1,967,510
May 29	Cologne	Germany	Lanxess Arena	Tom Odell	34,975 / 34,975	$3,883,180
May 30	Cologne	Germany	Lanxess Arena	Tom Odell	34,975 / 34,975	$3,883,180
June 1	Prague	Czech Republic	O_{2} Arena	Tom Odell	20,209 / 20,209	$2,420,530
June 3	Kraków	Poland	Tauron Arena	Tom Odell	38,355 / 38,355	$4,305,383
June 4	Kraków	Poland	Tauron Arena	Tom Odell	38,355 / 38,355	$4,305,383
June 6	Vienna	Austria	Wiener Stadthalle	Tom Odell	15,988 / 15,988	$2,037,793
June 8	Casalecchio di Reno (Note: Labeled as Bologna in promotional material)	Italy	Unipol Arena	Tom Odell	15,342 / 15,342	$1,848,710
June 10	Paris	France	Accor Arena	Lola Young	34,000 / 34,000	$4,464,243
June 11	Paris	France	Accor Arena	Lola Young	34,000 / 34,000	$4,464,243
June 14	Barcelona	Spain	Palau Sant Jordi	Tom Odell	36,447 / 36,447	$4,625,540
June 15	Barcelona	Spain	Palau Sant Jordi	Tom Odell	36,447 / 36,447	$4,625,540
July 7	Glasgow	Scotland	OVO Hydro	Syd	27,840 / 27,840	$4,604,525
July 8	Glasgow	Scotland	OVO Hydro	Syd	27,840 / 27,840	$4,604,525
July 10	London	England	The O_{2} Arena	Syd	114,763 / 114,763	$19,845,671
July 11	London	England	The O_{2} Arena	Syd	114,763 / 114,763	$19,845,671
July 13	London	England	The O_{2} Arena	Syd	114,763 / 114,763	$19,845,671
July 14	London	England	The O_{2} Arena	Magdalena Bay	114,763 / 114,763	$19,845,671
July 16	London	England	The O_{2} Arena	Magdalena Bay	114,763 / 114,763	$19,845,671
July 17	London	England	The O_{2} Arena	Magdalena Bay	114,763 / 114,763	$19,845,671
July 19	Manchester	England	Co-op Live	Syd	77,931 / 77,931	$12,724,050
July 20	Manchester	England	Co-op Live	Syd	77,931 / 77,931	$12,724,050
July 22	Manchester	England	Co-op Live	Syd	77,931 / 77,931	$12,724,050
July 23	Manchester	England	Co-op Live	Syd	77,931 / 77,931	$12,724,050
July 26	Dublin	Ireland	3Arena	Syd	24,630 / 24,630	$3,741,599
July 27	Dublin	Ireland	3Arena	Syd	24,630 / 24,630	$3,741,599
August 16	Saitama (Note: Labeled as Tokyo in promotional material)	Japan	Saitama Super Arena	Yoasobi	—	—
August 17	Saitama	Japan	Saitama Super Arena	Fujii Kaze	—	—
October 9	Miami	United States	Kaseya Center	Tom Odell	—	—
October 11	Miami	United States	Kaseya Center	Tom Odell	—	—
October 12	Miami	United States	Kaseya Center	Tom Odell	—	—
October 14	Orlando	United States	Kia Center	Young Miko	—	—
October 16	Raleigh	United States	Lenovo Center	Young Miko	—	—
October 17	Raleigh	United States	Lenovo Center	Young Miko	—	—
October 19	Charlotte	United States	Spectrum Center	Young Miko	—	—
October 20	Charlotte	United States	Spectrum Center	Young Miko	—	—
October 23	Philadelphia	United States	Xfinity Mobile Arena	Young Miko	18,997 / 18,997	$3,069,858
October 25	Elmont (Note: Labeled as Long Island in promotional material)	United States	UBS Arena	Young Miko	—	—
October 26	Elmont	United States	UBS Arena	Young Miko	—	—
November 7	New Orleans	United States	Smoothie King Center	Men I Trust	—	—
November 8	New Orleans	United States	Smoothie King Center	Men I Trust	—	—
November 10	Tulsa	United States	BOK Center	Men I Trust	34,373 / 34,373	$5,060,951
November 11	Tulsa	United States	BOK Center	Men I Trust	34,373 / 34,373	$5,060,951
November 13	Austin	United States	Moody Center	Men I Trust	—	—
November 14	Austin	United States	Moody Center	Men I Trust	—	—
November 18	Phoenix	United States	Mortgage Matchup Center	Lucy Dacus	30,438 / 30,438	$4,673,815
November 19	Phoenix	United States	Mortgage Matchup Center	Lucy Dacus	30,438 / 30,438	$4,673,815
November 22	San Francisco	United States	Chase Center	Lucy Dacus	—	—
November 23	San Francisco	United States	Chase Center	Lucy Dacus	—	—
Total					1,515,948 / 1,515,948 (100%)	$226,169,004
