= Male Fantasy =

- "Official Live Performance" cover

Single by Billie Eilish

from the album Happier Than Ever
- Released: December 6, 2021
- Genre: Folk
- Length: 3:14
- Label: Darkroom; Interscope
- Songwriters: Billie Eilish; Finneas O'Connell
- Producer: Finneas

Billie Eilish singles chronology
| "Happier Than Ever" (2021) | "Male Fantasy" (2021) | "What Was I Made For?" (2023) |

Music video
- "Male Fantasy" on YouTube

"Male Fantasy" is a song by American singer-songwriter Billie Eilish, included as the closing track on her second studio album Happier Than Ever (2021). A country-tinged, folk ballad about a break-up, it was written by Eilish and its producer, her brother Finneas O'Connell. In the verses, the narrator attempts to watch pornography to distract herself from her problems, and she criticizes how its standards around beauty and sexuality negatively affect people. She fantasizes about her past lover in the chorus, admitting that she can never hate them no matter how hard she forces herself to do so.

"Male Fantasy" was one of the last songs written for Happier Than Ever, and Eilish selected it as the album's concluding track since she considered the song reminiscent of closing credits. It was released as the seventh and last single from the album on December 6, 2021. The song received praise from music critics, who complimented it for the simplistic arrangement and inventive lyrics, and became a fan favorite. "Male Fantasy" was Happier Than Ever's least commercially successful single, with low peaks on national charts in Australia (59), Canada (62), and Portugal (80). In the United States, the song failed to chart on the Billboard Hot 100, only entering the Bubbling Under Hot 100 chart at second place.

Eilish directed and edited the music video for "Male Fantasy", which premiered the same day as its release. The video features several jump cuts and a predominantly light blue color scheme; in it, Eilish wanders around a claustrophobic house alone. She performed the song as part of a Vevo Live video series on YouTube, singing it while on a golden bed in an Old Hollywood-esque hotel, and a mashup for Saturday Night Live alongside Happier Than Ever's title track. Eilish included the song in the set lists of a 2021 concert film and a 2022–2023 world tour in support of the album.

== Background and release ==
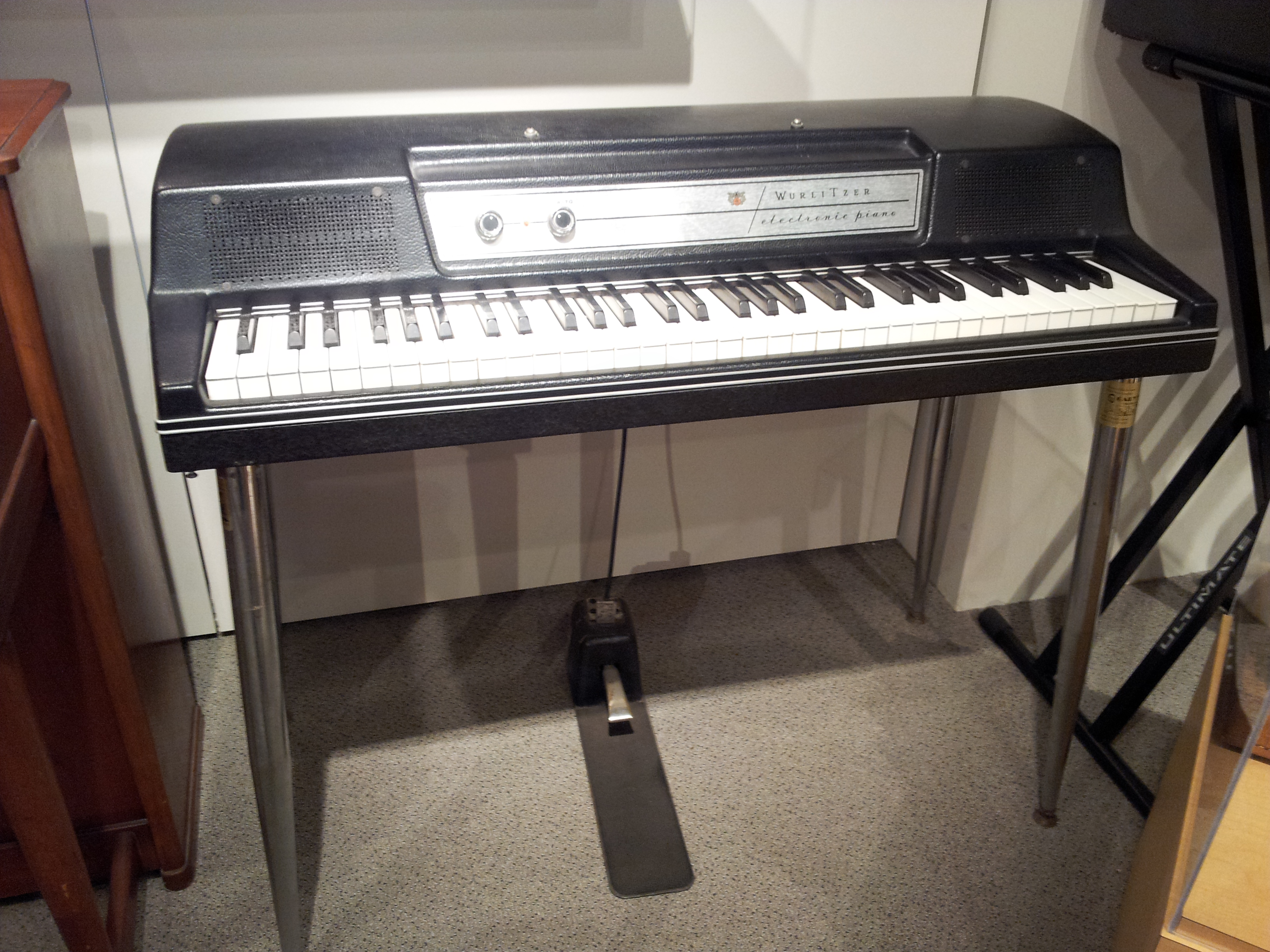
Finneas used Wurlitzer electronic piano (pictured) in the song's instrumentation.

"Male Fantasy" was written by Eilish and Finneas O'Connell, with the latter serving as the track's producer. O'Connell also instrumented the track with an acoustic guitar, synthesizer, and Wurlitzer electronic piano. The idea for the song was formed by the singer after she had a conversation about how "stupid and unrealistic" pornography is. She saw this topic as a "good idea" for a song, hence it is "uncomfortable" to discuss and can "make you feel violated and good at the same time". In an interview with i-D, Eilish opened up that she usually writes about her past, since it is easier for her than setting lyrics of current events. However, Eilish admitted that the process was "hard and satisfying and revealing and exposing and also incredibly cathartic too", whereas the song "pretty much wrote itself".

In early February 2021, the song was not considered to be included on Happier Than Ever, with the title track concluding the track listing. However, after "Male Fantasy" was written, the singer said that it "felt better to close it with that", since the track "felt like credits". Additionally, Eilish did not want to end the album on an "angry note", expressing that "nothing should end on a bad note". The singer also enclosed that the song is one of her favorite album tracks, and as a result of her synesthesia, she finds it to be represented by a light blue color. The song was picked as the seventh single promoting the album on December 6, 2021. (Note: Sources stating that "Male Fantasy" is a single: Teen Vogue, Rolling Stone UK, Dazed, NME, and Billboard.)

== Music and lyrics ==
Musically, "Male Fantasy" is an acoustic, country-flavored, guitar-driven folk break-up ballad. (Note: Sources labeling "Male Fantasy" as an acoustic song: MTV, The New York Times and Vulture; Sources stating that "Male Fantasy" contains elements of country: Contactmusic.com, The Independent, and Rolling Stone; Sources stating that "Male Fantasy" is backed-up by guitar chords: Billboard, Rolling Stone, and Pure Charts; Sources labeling "Male Fantasy" as a folk song: Pitchfork and Rolling Stone; Source labeling "Male Fantasy" as a break-up song: Vulture; Sources labeling "Male Fantasy" as a ballad: MTV, The New York Times, Vulture, Billboard, Pure Charts, The A.V. Club, The News International, Static Media, Entertainment Weekly, and Uproxx) According to the sheet music published by Universal Music Publishing Group, the track has been composed in D major key. It is set in the time signature of 4/4 with a tempo of 108 to 112 beats per minute. Eilish is heard singing in her higher register, with her vocals spanning from B_{3} to D_{5}. The singer is depicted as heartbroken on the track, trying to distract herself with pornography. Afterwards, she uses the song's first verse to criticize how pornography affects youth and beauty standards, and additionally utilizes the concept present honesty and facade in relationships. After singing: "I know I should, but I could never hate you"; Eilish asks "Want me to sing in here?", which according to Slant Magazine's Sal Cinquemani, symbolizes "perhaps unintentionally, [the singer's] struggle to assert her own agency." She begins the second verse by singing about how she has nothing in common with an old friend. Later, she self-reflects and "further explore[s] her own role in a male dominated entertainment world".

"Male Fantasy"
A 19-second snippet of "Male Fantasy" where Eilish sings over a simple guitar in the background. The sample presents the second half of the second verse, where the singer seems to nod to one of the previous album tracks, "Everybody Dies".

According to Carl Wilson of Slate, even though the song begins on "pondering how the male gaze shapes unrealistic portrayals of women's satisfaction with sex", it is actually about an "equally distracting fantasy about a male, and how he might have been better to her". Pitchfork's Cat Zhang made a remark that "Male Fantasy" resembles the style of Phoebe Bridgers's Stranger in the Alps (2017); whilst Konstantinos Pappis from Our Culture Mag said it is "the kind of plaintive acoustic song you could now imagine Clairo singing backing vocals on". In an article published on MTV, Athena Serrano wrote that the track tries to distinguish what is the true love. Writing for MTV Australia, Jackson Langford commented the song is "melancholy and ethereal", describing its production as "muted", similar to the rest of the album. Rolling Stone's Rob Sheffield added that the singer wonders "how much of her own life is just fantasy" in the song. Rachel Brodsky from Uproxx wrote that the track is about "being kinder to yourself, about letting yourself take the necessary time to heal after a broken heart".

== Critical reception ==
"Male Fantasy" was met with widespread praise from music critics and also became a fan favorite. Derrick Rossignol of Uproxx said that "Male Fantasy" is one of the more "personal" moments on Happier Than Ever; while Robin Murray from Clash described the song as a "subdued finale" with a "bravura lyrical performance (...) sharpened by the minimalist arrangement". According to Pappis, the song is one of the album's "quieter moments", but unlike "Everybody Dies" and "Halley's Comet", he did not call it "half-baked". To the contrary, he dubbed the song as a "notable exception". Neil McCormick from The Daily Telegraph picked the same set of the songs, and opined that they are "drowsy ballads (...) counterbalanced with a fuck-you spikiness that ensures Eilish never comes across as a victim". Writing for Beats Per Minute, Tim Sentz commented that "Male Fantasy" is a "perfect example of how Eilish can be both naïve and wise beyond her years at once; something that is displayed repeatedly over the course of the album". Mary Siroky from Consequence opined that the song is "fearless" and a "despondent meditation on heartbreak and modern womanhood".

Charles Holmes of The Ringer called "Male Fantasy" his favorite album cut, and mentioned his wish that "all of Happier Than Ever was this stripped down". Brenton Blanchet of Complex labeled the song as an "album standout". The placement of the song within the album has been discussed by critics, with The A.V. Club's Alex McLevy and Young Hollywood's Rebecca Breitfeller being fond of it; the former noted a "masterful closer", while the latter described it as a "beautiful song". The staff of Chorus.fm was divided on the placement of "Male Fantasy", with Garrett Lemons keen of it, whereas Aaron Mook and Adam Grundy felt like it was an "odd" choice to conclude the project. Callie Ahlgrim and Courteney Larocca of Insider understood and liked the singer's intentions with the track, but stated that "Happier Than Ever" would be a better way to end the album. In NME's review of Happier Than Ever, El Hunt singled out "Male Fantasy" as a track that "wittily picks apart the stilted dialogue and near-instant orgasms of a certain type of pornography".

=== Lists ===
On a Rolling Stone-published list of Eilish's best songs, "Male Fantasy" claimed 20th place, with Sheffield commenting that the song "sneaks up and destroys you emotionally". Sophie Walker of the Forty-Five placed the song at the 21st position on her list of the singer's best-worst cuts, writing: "Picking apart the way she's both defiant against and yet entrapped by men and what they want, 'Male Fantasy' is the only moment Billie waves the white flag and learns to let go on Happier Than Ever." On a ranking of the artist's cuts composed by Langford, the track was placed at number 23, with him commenting that it is "heartbreaking, but not exactly groundbreaking". "Male Fantasy" appeared at number 26 of the list of Eilish's worst to best tracks published by Brodsky, where she praised the song, hence it proves that the artist can sing.

Hannah Dailey made her ranking of Happier Than Ever tracks for Billboard, where she put the single at number four, concluding that even though it is "slightly alarming" to hear someone as young as Eilish touch on subject of pornography in the lyrics, the track "delivers a poignant snapshot of Eilish's mindset once you get past that first mild jolt of shock factor". Writing for USA Today, Charles Trepany called "Male Fantasy" the third best song of the album, saying that the song's instrumentation is "simple", whilst its "inventive" lyrics made him place the track on the ranking.

== Commercial performance ==
"Male Fantasy" failed to chart on the US Billboard Hot 100, but peaked at number two on Bubbling Under Hot 100 chart. Additionally, the track managed to debut on the Hot Rock & Alternative Songs chart at number 20, making it Eilish's 15th top 20 entry on the chart. In Canada, the song logged number 62, whereas on Billboard-published global surveys, the single managed to peak at number 81 on the Global 200, while peaking at 125 position on the list excluding the United States. Elsewhere, the track charted on Australian and Portuguese national charts, at numbers 59 and 80, respectively. Additionally, "Male Fantasy" was placed at number 91 on the UK Streaming Chart and number 9 on the Sweden Heatseeker chart.

== Music video ==
=== Background and synopsis ===
The music video features many jump cuts. Consequence writer Wren Graves suggested that they "might be an illustration of the effects of depression on memory".

A music video of "Male Fantasy" premiered on YouTube, directed and edited by Eilish. On her Instagram account, she wrote that the visual was "one of [her] first videos to edit all alone" and described this experience as a "fun task" and "such a joy". It is the sixth visual from the Happier Than Ever era that she directed.

The video is based around many jump cuts, and it is set in a light blue filter, which is the color that "Male Fantasy" represents for the singer. The visual features Eilish wandering alone in dimly lit house, nodding to the song's opening verse. In the clip, the singer is depicted as depressed and trying to cope with a broken heart. The clip starts with Eilish looking at her reflection in the mirror, and later she is seen staring at the TV screen. In the following scene, the artist "uncomfortably" rolls around in bed. Next, the singer eats alone, lying in the kitchen, and sitting on the bathroom floor. After that, Eilish checks up on the fridge. She is also contemplating, and wandering around the house. The music video ends with the singer looking again in the bathroom mirror, but this time with curtains drawn. Many of the scenes are repeated during the visual, only differing in the positions made by Eilish.

=== Reception ===
The video was called "emotional" by Brenton Blanchet from Complex; whilst in articles published on Entertainment Weekly, The Fader, and Uproxx, it was described as "gloomy". BroadwayWorld's Michael Major labelled the visual as "powerful"; whereas it was named "somber" by Mitchell Peters of Billboard and Web Desk from The News International. In a separate article, Peters also called the video "heartbreaking". For Rolling Stone, Paul Larisha wrote "[Eilish's] wandering moves in tandem with the song's melodic progression, filling out a whole day inside with nothingness and melancholic lingering." The house in the clip was described as "claustrophobic" by The Fader's Raphael Helfand. The visual received 2.1 million views on YouTube in the first day of publication.

== Live performances ==
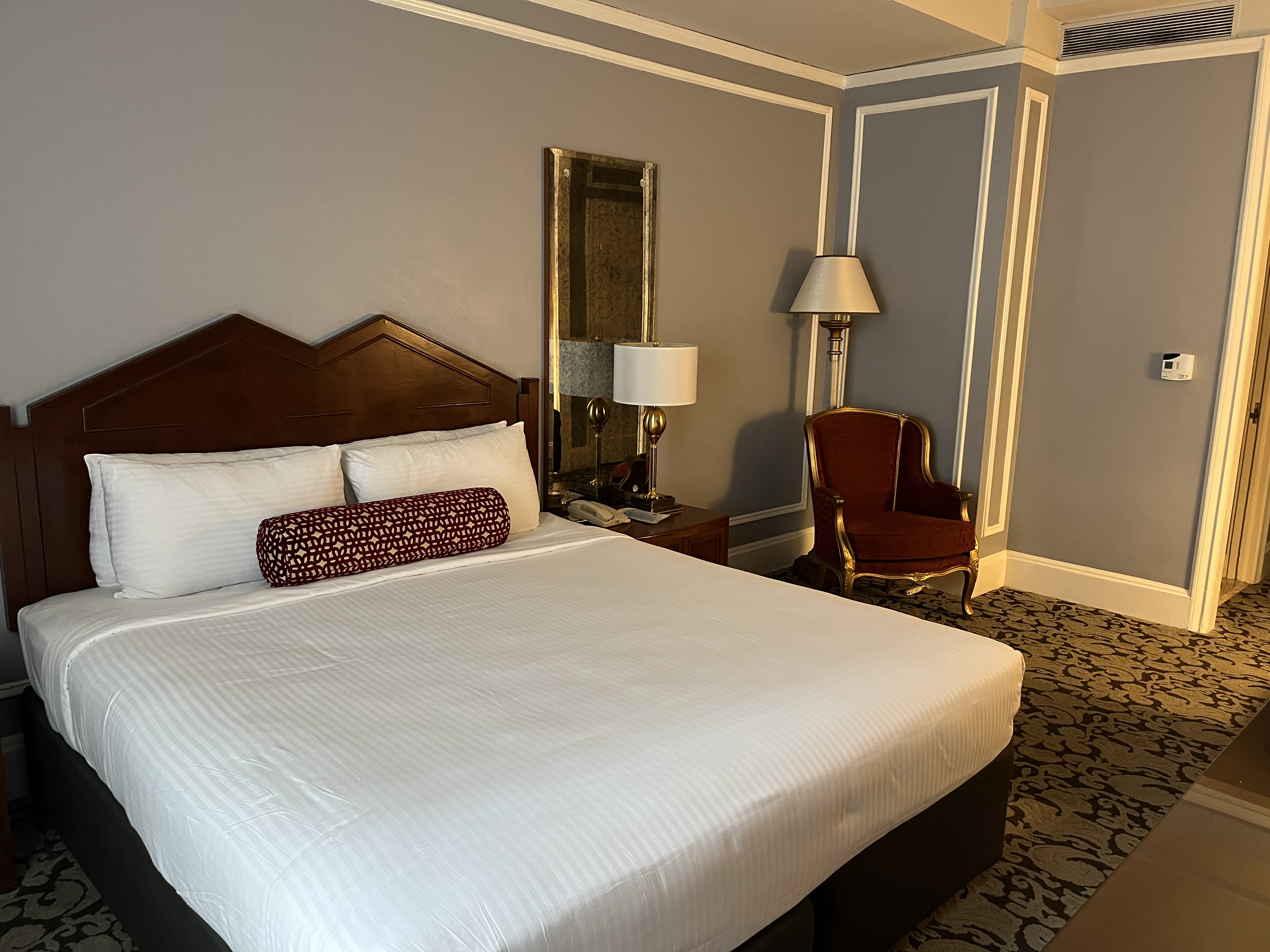
The official live performance for "Male Fantasy" was filmed in one of the rooms of the Los Angeles Biltmore Hotel, chosen to evoke a subtle Old Hollywood aesthetic.

On August 4, 2021, Eilish published a Vevo Live performance of "Male Fantasy" on her YouTube channel. The video was directed by Kyle Goldberg and shot on 35 mm movie film. Wearing a white cutout sweater, the singer is sitting on a golden satin bed in an "amber-colored" mahogany hotel bedroom, while Finneas is featured on the other side of the room, playing white acoustic guitar in a cabinet. The venue in which the performance took place was the Biltmore Hotel in Los Angeles, selected to reinforce the subtle Old Hollywood aesthetic that Eilish envisioned for Happier Than Ever. The arrangement was described as "haunting" and "acoustic" by NME's Daniel Peters; whereas Rolling Stone's Emily Zemler and Hot Press' dubbed it as "intimate". Writing for Hypebeast, Brycen Saunders called the performance "inviting", further adding that Eilish's outfit is "casual" and that her voice is a "whisper cadence". Dazed's Brit Dawson dubbed the room where the singer was performing as "Hollywood-esque", while summarizing the rendition as "tender". Next month, the singer released her concert film entitled Happier Than Ever: A Love Letter to Los Angeles, which features a performance of the song.

On December 11, 2021, Eilish served a double duty of a host and a musical guest at Saturday Night Live, and she performed "Happier Than Ever" and "Male Fantasy" there, with both gigs featuring scenery nodding to the tracks' music videos. In the latter performance, Eilish was accompanied by Finneas, and the two of them were sitting on a floor wearing sweatshirts, shorts, and socks. NME's Ali Shutler called the performance "acoustic"; whereas Michael Peters dubbed it as "thoughtful". Writing for Consequence, Jesse Hassenger opinied that "[t]his performance literalized the bedroom pop side of Eilish's work". In 2022, the singer embarked on a 2022–2023 world tour in support of Happier Than Ever, where "Male Fantasy" was performed between "Your Power" and the Not My Responsibility interlude. Eilish played the song on a guitar sitting alone on the stage.

== Credits and personnel ==
- Billie Eilish – vocals, songwriting, vocal engineering
- Finneas O'Connell – songwriting, production, acoustic guitar, engineering, synthesizer, vocal arrangement, Wurlitzer electronic piano
- Dave Kutch – mastering
- Rob Kinelski – mixing
- Casey Cuayo – mixing assistant
- Eli Heisler – mixing assistant

== Charts ==
Chart performance for "Male Fantasy"
| Chart (2021) | Peak position |
|---|---|
| Australia (ARIA) | 59 |
| Canada Hot 100 (Billboard) | 62 |
| Global 200 (Billboard) | 81 |
| Portugal (AFP) | 80 |
| Sweden Heatseeker (Sverigetopplistan) | 9 |
| UK Audio Streaming (Official Charts) | 91 |
| US Bubbling Under Hot 100 (Billboard) | 2 |
| US Hot Rock & Alternative Songs (Billboard) | 20 |

== Certifications ==
Certifications for "Male Fantasy"
| Region | Certification | Certified units/sales |
|---|---|---|
| Australia (ARIA) | Platinum | 70,000^{‡} |
| Brazil (Pro-Música Brasil) | Platinum | 40,000^{‡} |
| Canada (Music Canada) | Platinum | 80,000^{‡} |
| New Zealand (RMNZ) | Gold | 15,000^{‡} |
| United Kingdom (BPI) | Silver | 200,000^{‡} |
^{‡} Sales+streaming figures based on certification alone.
