= Happier Than Ever, The World Tour =

2022–23 concert tour by Billie Eilish

- World tour by Billie Eilish
- Promotional poster for the tour
- Location: Asia; Europe; North America; Oceania; South America
- Associated album: Happier Than Ever
- Start date: February 3, 2022
- End date: April 2, 2023
- Legs: 6
- No. of shows: 88
- Supporting acts: Tkay Maidza; Dora Jar; Duckwrth; Jessie Reyez; Jungle; Arlo Parks; Girl in Red; Sampa the Great; Omar Apollo
- Box office: $131.7 million (79 shows)

Billie Eilish concert chronology
- Where Do We Go? World Tour (2020); Happier Than Ever, The World Tour (2022–2023); Hit Me Hard and Soft: The Tour (2024–2025)

Happier Than Ever, The World Tour was the sixth headlining concert tour and first full arena tour by American singer-songwriter Billie Eilish, in support of her second studio album Happier Than Ever (2021). The tour commenced on February 3, 2022, at the Smoothie King Center in New Orleans, Louisiana, and concluded on April 2, 2023 at the Arena VFG in Guadalajara, Mexico.

== Background ==
On May 21, 2021, the tour was announced through a YouTube video posted to her official page. In the short clip, the artist sits alone in the auditorium, while at the end of the visual, the camera points to Eilish's official website. Subsequently, Eilish posted further announcements through other social media pages such as Twitter. The tour used Ticketmaster's Verified fan program in North America. It initially consisted of 50 dates (32 in North America and 18 in Europe). Tickets sold out quickly, leading to the addition of more dates. A third and fourth leg, with locations in Oceania and Latin America, respectively, were also added to the tour.

Eilish worked with Apple Music to exclusively host a film of one of the concerts, specifically one of her shows at the O2 Arena in London. She billed the film as a way for fans who missed out on tickets to experience the tour for themselves, wanting more people to recognize her for her showmanship live. Eilish previewed the film by sharing performances of two tracks from the album—"Therefore I Am" and "I Didn't Change My Number"—through her YouTube account. An extended cut of the film was also released in limited cinemas worldwide on January 27, 2023. It was directed by Sam Wrench.

== Concert synopsis ==
The show begins with strobing lights, white backdrops, whilst Eilish is catapulted from under the stage to perform "Bury a Friend", accompanied by a drummer, Andrew Marshall, and her brother, Finneas, on guitar. It is followed by the "slinkier" and "hard-hitting" track "I Didn't Change My Number". Next, she sings "NDA", while the stage projects a street and the monitors display cars swerving, later transitioning to "Therefore I Am", when the screens turn red. The singer proceeds with a "hypnotic" shortened rendition of "My Strange Addiction" and a "downshifted" and shortened version of "Idontwannabeyouanymore" before transitioning to "Lovely". During the shortened "You Should See Me in a Crown" performance, Eilish instructs her fans to stay still "like Squid Game" and scream as loud as they possibly can.

The "Billie Bossa Nova" performance is "turned into a libidinous rager" with backdrops projecting faceless, scantily clad dancing bodies. According to The New York Times' Lindsay Zoladz, the performance of "Goldwing" is a "kinetic call-and-response number", where she asks fans to sing, and then she asks fans to sing from their lowest voice possible to their loudest voice possible. Later, she follows with the "quieter" song "Halley's Comet" on select shows. On select shows, Eilish performs "No Time to Die" next, Eilish performs "Oxytocin", which also includes a fragment of "Copycat". The artist additionally asks fans to get as low as possible, so all of them can jump at once.

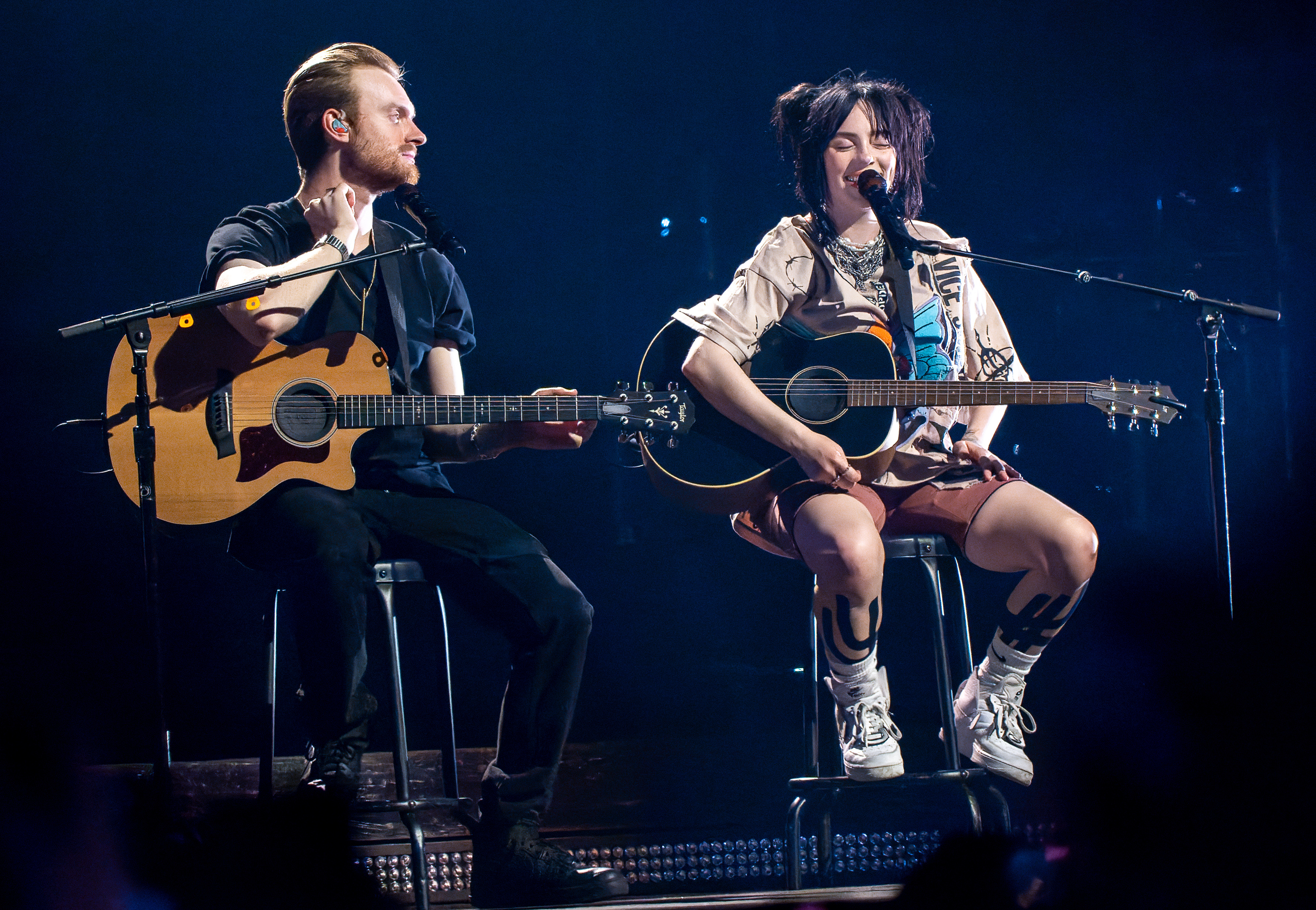
The tour's acoustic interlude. Eilish first performed the two tracks from her second extended play, Guitar Songs, during this section.

To begin the tour's acoustic interlude, Finneas joins Eilish on stage so they can perform "Your Power" with guitars. In select concerts, starting with the first night at Manchester on June 7, the two debut the song "TV". Alongside "The 30th", it is part of Eilish's two-track extended play Guitar Songs, released in July 2022. She and Finneas performed "The 30th" in place of "TV" for the first time in the tour's Manila concert; Eilish remarked that "The 30th" was hard to sing for her due to its personal lyrics. When they do not perform "TV" or "The 30th", Finneas returns to the keyboard, leaving Eilish at center stage to sing "Male Fantasy" by herself. On select shows, such as the entire Australian leg, she and Finneas perform "I Love You" to start the acoustic section, mashing it up with "Your Power".

It is followed by the "Not My Responsibility" interlude, after which she segues into "Overheated", during which she is on the crane, which is featured in all shows in Australia, all shows in Europe except Pilton, and all shows in North America. After that, the singer asks the fans to do a Mexican wave with their phones in select shows, such as the entire Australian leg, then performs a mashup of "Bellyache", "Ocean Eyes", and "Bored". On the shows where she gets off the crane, she goes back to the stage, touching fans' hands as she passes by them. Upon returning back to the stage, she performs "Getting Older" on select shows, with home videos of the singer and her family being shown on the backdrops. On select shows, such as the entire Australian leg, "Getting Older" is shortened. She then performs "Lost Cause" during select shows, before she has a talk with the audience, and asks fans to hug the person next to them, and give that person a hug. She follows the talk with a performance of "When the Party's Over". For "All the Good Girls Go to Hell," the screens present the effects of climate change, such as polar bears on melting ice caps, pollution, oil spills, and wildfires. The visuals turn from flames to completely red during the song's chorus.

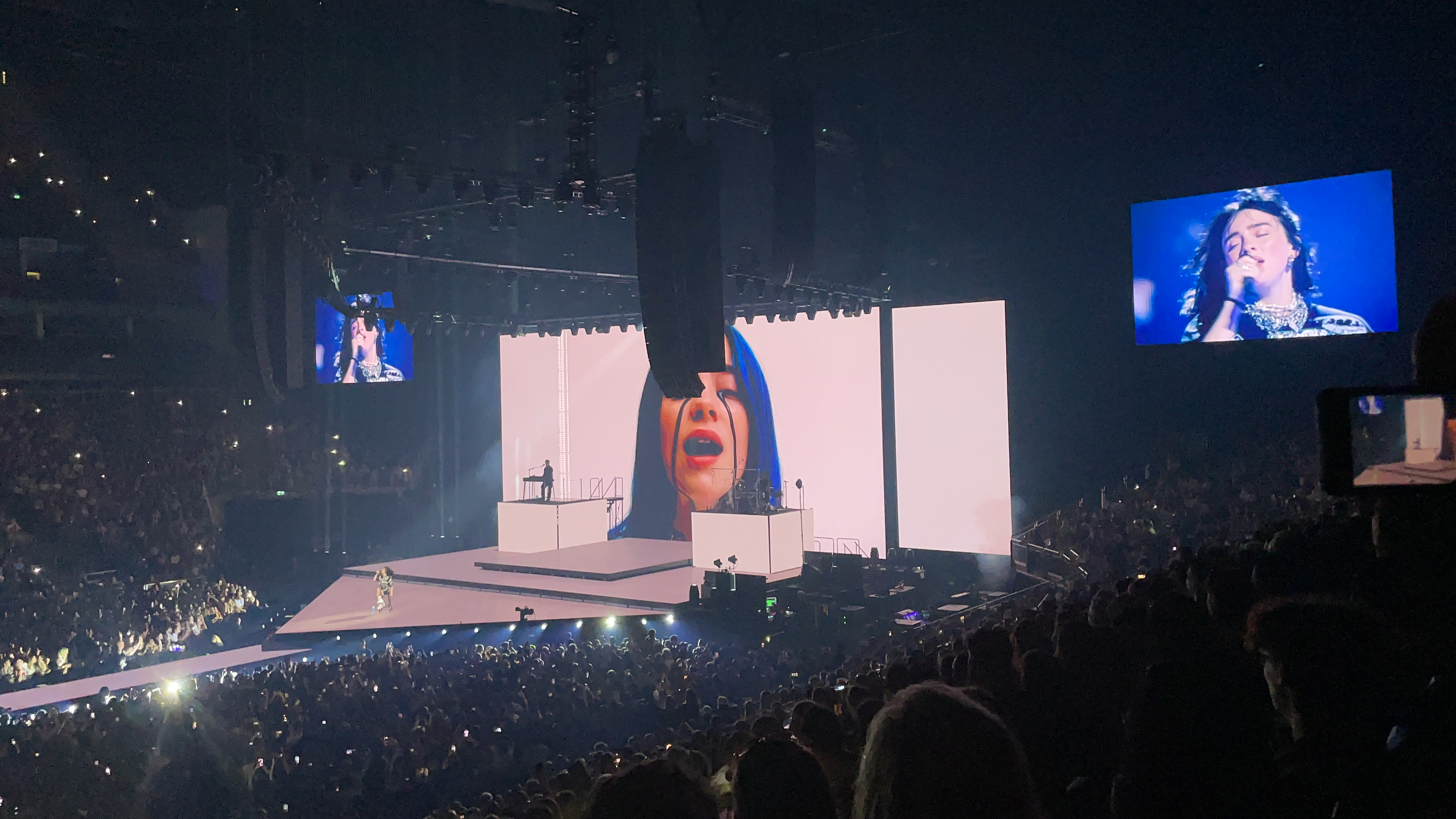
Eilish performing at The O2, London, during the Happier Than Ever Tour

Eilish starts an encore with "Everything I Wanted", which is called "relatively breezy" by Keith Spera of The New Orleans Advocate. Before she starts, singing, she asks fans to give the people next to them a hug. She follows it with a performance of "Bad Guy", which sees her jumping around the stage, and confetti shooting up from the ceiling. "Happier Than Ever" is the concluding song of the show, where Finneas plays the electric guitar, and Eilish headbangs during the second half of the song. "Goodbye" plays in the background as the show's outro, where she touches fans' hands.

== Set list ==
This set list is for the show in Pittsburgh, Pennsylvania on February 8, 2022. It is not intended to represent all concerts for the tour.

1. "Bury a Friend"
2. "I Didn't Change My Number"
3. "NDA"
4. "Therefore I Am"
5. "My Strange Addiction"
6. "Idontwannabeyouanymore"
7. "Lovely"
8. "You Should See Me in a Crown"
9. "Billie Bossa Nova"
10. "Goldwing"
11. "Halley's Comet"
12. "Oxytocin" (contains an excerpt from "Copycat")
13. "Ilomilo"
14. "Your Power" (with Finneas)
15. "Male Fantasy"
16. "Not My Responsibility" (interlude)
17. "Overheated"
18. "Bellyache"
19. "Ocean Eyes"
20. "Bored"
21. "Getting Older"
22. "Lost Cause"
23. "When the Party's Over"
24. "All the Good Girls Go to Hell"
25. "Everything I Wanted"
26. "Bad Guy"
27. "Happier Than Ever"
28. "Goodbye" (outro)

=== Notes ===
- Starting on June 7, 2022, "TV" was added to the setlist. Similarly, Eilish added "The 30th" to shows in Manila, Seoul, Kuala Lumpur, and Tokyo.
- Starting on December 13, 2022, "Xanny", "My Future", and "Bitches Broken Hearts" were added to the setlist.
- Starting on March 24, 2023, "Wish You Were Gay" was added to the setlist.
- Starting with the first show in Sydney, "Halley's Comet" was permanently removed from the setlist.
- During the first Hometown Encore show in Inglewood, Labrinth joined Eilish onstage to perform "Mount Everest" and "Never Felt So Alone".
- During the second Hometown Encore show in Inglewood, Dave Grohl and Phoebe Bridgers joined Eilish onstage do perform "My Hero" and "Motion Sickness".
- During the last Hometown Encore show in Inglewood, Khalid and Donald Glover joined Eilish onstage to perform "Lovely", "Location" and "Redbone". At all three shows, Eilish also sang a cover of "Have Yourself a Merry Little Christmas".

== Tour dates ==
List of 2022 concerts showing date, city, country, venue, opening act, attendance, and gross revenue
Date (2022)	City	Country	Venue	Opening acts	Attendance	Revenue
February 3	New Orleans	United States	Smoothie King Center	—N/a	12,113 / 12,113	$1,554,074
February 5	Atlanta	United States	State Farm Arena	Tkay Maidza	11,486 / 11,486	$1,502,389
February 6	Charlotte	United States	Spectrum Center	Tkay Maidza	11,589 / 11,589	$1,410,027
February 8	Pittsburgh	United States	PPG Paints Arena	Tkay Maidza	12,402 / 12,402	$1,421,176
February 9	Washington, D.C.	United States	Capital One Arena	Tkay Maidza	13,367 / 13,367	$1,817,846
February 10	State College (Note: Promoted as University Park)	United States	Bryce Jordan Center	Tkay Maidza	11,453 / 11,453	$1,292,145
February 12	Buffalo	United States	KeyBank Center	Dora Jar (Note: Willow was originally slated to open for Eilish, but later dropped out due to production limitations.)	12,161 / 12,161	$1,366,921
February 13	Philadelphia	United States	Wells Fargo Center	Dora Jar	12,495 / 12,495	$1,600,257
February 15	Elmont	United States	UBS Arena	Dora Jar	11,084 / 11,084	$1,574,391
February 18	New York City	United States	Madison Square Garden	Dora Jar	26,976 / 26,976	$3,927,430
February 19	New York City	United States	Madison Square Garden	Dora Jar	26,976 / 26,976	$3,927,430
February 20	Boston	United States	TD Garden	Dora Jar	12,910 / 12,910	$1,698,934
February 22	Newark	United States	Prudential Center	Dora Jar	12,511 / 12,511	$1,711,256
March 8	Birmingham	United States	Legacy Arena	Duckwrth	10,181 / 10,181	$1,400,413
March 9	Nashville	United States	Bridgestone Arena	Duckwrth	13,434 / 13,434	$1,833,956
March 11	Louisville	United States	KFC Yum! Center	Duckwrth	16,003 / 16,003	$1,911,428
March 12	Detroit	United States	Little Caesars Arena	Duckwrth	15,322 / 15,322	$1,953,284
March 14	Chicago	United States	United Center	Duckwrth	13,852 / 13,852	$1,770,396
March 15	Saint Paul	United States	Xcel Energy Center	Duckwrth	14,924 / 14,924	$1,793,012
March 16	Omaha	United States	CHI Health Center Omaha	Duckwrth	14,496 / 14,496	$1,748,369
March 19	Denver	United States	Ball Arena	Duckwrth	12,862 / 12,862	$1,749,222
March 21	Salt Lake City	United States	Vivint Arena	Duckwrth	11,689 / 11,689	$1,566,407
March 24	Vancouver	Canada	Rogers Arena	Duckwrth	13,154 / 13,154	$1,666,407
March 25	Seattle	United States	Climate Pledge Arena	Duckwrth	28,554 / 28,554	$3,980,733
March 26	Seattle	United States	Climate Pledge Arena	Duckwrth	28,554 / 28,554	$3,980,733
March 29	San Francisco	United States	Chase Center	Duckwrth	13,207 / 13,207	$1,894,223
March 30	Sacramento	United States	Golden 1 Center	Duckwrth	13,579 / 13,579	$1,959,433
April 1	Paradise (Note: Labeled as Las Vegas in promotional material.)	United States	T-Mobile Arena	Duckwrth	14,772 / 14,772	$1,884,691
April 2	Glendale	United States	Gila River Arena	Duckwrth	27,068 / 27,068	$3,758,290
April 4 (Note: The concert on April 4, 2022, in Glendale at the Gila River Arena was originally scheduled for April 3, 2022, however due to conflicts with the new 64th Annual Grammy Awards date the show was postponed.)	Glendale	United States	Gila River Arena	Duckwrth	27,068 / 27,068	$3,758,290
April 6	Inglewood (Note: Labeled as Los Angeles in promotional material.)	United States	Kia Forum	Duckwrth	41,321 / 41,321	$5,715,143
April 8	Inglewood	United States	Kia Forum	Dora Jar	41,321 / 41,321	$5,715,143
April 9	Inglewood	United States	Kia Forum	Dora Jar	41,321 / 41,321	$5,715,143
April 16 (Note: Part of the 2022 Coachella Valley Music and Arts Festival)	Indio	United States	Empire Polo Club	—N/a	—N/a	—N/a
April 23	Indio	United States	Empire Polo Club	—N/a	—N/a	—N/a
June 3	Belfast	Northern Ireland	The SSE Arena	Jessie Reyez	9,259 / 9,549	$907,993
June 4	Dublin	Ireland	3Arena	Jessie Reyez	24,304 / 24,304	$2,158,637
June 5	Dublin	Ireland	3Arena	Jungle	24,304 / 24,304	$2,158,637
June 7	Manchester	England	AO Arena	Jessie Reyez	30,643 / 30,643	$2,829,606
June 8	Manchester	England	AO Arena	Jungle	30,643 / 30,643	$2,829,606
June 10	London	England	The O_{2} Arena	Jessie Reyez	106,803 / 106,803 (Note: Attendance and box score data combined for all shows in London.)	$10,083,194
June 11	London	England	The O_{2} Arena	Jessie Reyez	106,803 / 106,803	$10,083,194
June 12	London	England	The O_{2} Arena	Jessie Reyez	106,803 / 106,803	$10,083,194
June 14	Glasgow	Scotland	OVO Hydro	Jessie Reyez	12,803 / 12,803	$1,160,754
June 15	Birmingham	England	Utilita Arena	Jessie Reyez	13,486 / 13,486	$1,266,418
June 16	London	England	The O_{2} Arena	Jungle	—N/a	—N/a
June 18	Amsterdam	Netherlands	Ziggo Dome	Jessie Reyez	16,439 / 16,439	$1,183,385
June 19	Frankfurt	Germany	Festhalle	Jessie Reyez	10,772 / 10,772	$868,130
June 21	Cologne	Germany	Lanxess Arena	Jessie Reyez	16,554 / 16,554	$1,213,211
June 22	Paris	France	Accor Arena	Jessie Reyez	13,783 / 13,783	$1,050,891
June 24 (Note: This concert was part of the Glastonbury Festival)	Pilton	England	Worthy Farm	—N/a	—N/a	—N/a
June 25	London	England	The O_{2} Arena	Arlo Parks	—N/a	—N/a
June 26	London	England	The O_{2} Arena	Girl in Red	—N/a	—N/a
June 28	Antwerp	Belgium	Sportpaleis	Jessie Reyez	20,793 / 20,793	$1,472,283
June 30	Berlin	Germany	Mercedes-Benz Arena	Jessie Reyez	13,935 / 13,935	$1,078,408
July 2	Zürich	Switzerland	Hallenstadion	Jessie Reyez	13,000 / 13,000	$1,528,765
August 13	Pasay (Note: Labeled as Manila in promotional material.)	Philippines	Mall of Asia Arena	—N/a	9,515 / 9,515	$1,412,663
August 15	Seoul	South Korea	Gocheok Sky Dome	—N/a	22,513 / 22,513	$2,378,464
August 18	Kuala Lumpur	Malaysia	Bukit Jalil National Stadium	—N/a	24,963 / 30,000	$2,725,442
August 21	Singapore		Singapore National Stadium	—N/a	30,041 / 34,996	$4,205,981
August 24	Pak Kret (Note: Labeled as Bangkok in promotional material.)	Thailand	Impact Arena	—N/a	10,833 / 10,833	$1,733,142
August 26	Tokyo	Japan	Ariake Arena	—N/a	10,166 / 10,166	$1,408,060
September 8	Auckland	New Zealand	Spark Arena	Dora Jar	36,151 / 36,151	$3,579,366
September 9	Auckland	New Zealand	Spark Arena	Dora Jar	36,151 / 36,151	$3,579,366
September 10	Auckland	New Zealand	Spark Arena	Dora Jar	36,151 / 36,151	$3,579,366
September 13	Sydney	Australia	Qudos Bank Arena	Dora Jar	48,049 / 48,049	$5,057,316
September 14	Sydney	Australia	Qudos Bank Arena	Dora Jar	48,049 / 48,049	$5,057,316
September 15	Sydney	Australia	Qudos Bank Arena	Sampa the Great	48,049 / 48,049	$5,057,316
September 17	Brisbane	Australia	Brisbane Entertainment Centre	Sampa the Great	33,897 / 33,897	$3,447,322
September 18	Brisbane	Australia	Brisbane Entertainment Centre	Sampa the Great	33,897 / 33,897	$3,447,322
September 19	Brisbane	Australia	Brisbane Entertainment Centre	Dora Jar	33,897 / 33,897	$3,447,322
September 22	Melbourne	Australia	Rod Laver Arena	Dora Jar	54,759 / 54,759	$7,483,178
September 23	Melbourne	Australia	Rod Laver Arena	Dora Jar	54,759 / 54,759	$7,483,178
September 24	Melbourne	Australia	Rod Laver Arena	Sampa the Great	54,759 / 54,759	$7,483,178
September 26	Melbourne	Australia	Rod Laver Arena	Sampa the Great	54,759 / 54,759	$7,483,178
September 29	Perth	Australia	RAC Arena	Sampa the Great	28,869 / 28,869	$2,716,658
September 30	Perth	Australia	RAC Arena	Sampa the Great	28,869 / 28,869	$2,716,658
December 13	Inglewood	United States	Kia Forum	—N/a	42,642 / 42,642	$6,038,828
December 15	Inglewood	United States	Kia Forum	—N/a	42,642 / 42,642	$6,038,828
December 16	Inglewood	United States	Kia Forum	—N/a	42,642 / 42,642	$6,038,828

List of 2023 concerts showing date, city, country, venue, opening act, attendance, and gross revenue
Date (2023)	City	Country	Venue	Opening acts	Attendance	Revenue
March 17 (Note: Part of Lollapalooza)	Santiago	Chile	Parque Bicentenario de Cerrilos	—N/a	—N/a	—N/a
March 19	San Isidro (Note: Labeled as Buenos Aires in promotional material.)	Argentina	Hipódromo de San Isidro	—N/a	—N/a	—N/a
March 22 (Note: Part of Asuncionico)	Luque (Note: Labeled as Asunción in promotional material.)	Paraguay	Parque Olímpico	—N/a	—N/a	—N/a
March 24	São Paulo	Brazil	Interlagos Circuit	—N/a	—N/a	—N/a
March 26 (Note: Part of Festival Estéreo Picnic)	Bogotá	Colombia	Campo de Golf Briceño	—N/a	—N/a	—N/a
March 30 (Note: The concert in Mexico City at Foro Sol on March 30, 2023, was originally scheduled for March 29. However, due to adverse weather conditions, the show was postponed to the following day.)	Mexico City	Mexico	Foro Sol	Omar Apollo	51,894 / 51,894	$3,889,949
March 31 (Note: Part of Pal Norte)	Monterrey	Mexico	Fundidora Park	—N/a	—N/a	—N/a
April 2	Guadalajara	Mexico	Arena VFG	Omar Apollo	12,845 / 12,845	$1,424,040
Total					1,155,016 / 1,165,008	$131,764,337

=== Cancelled dates ===
List of cancelled concerts showing date, city, country, venue, and reason for cancellation
Date	City	Country	Venue	Reason
February 15, 2022	Montreal	Canada	Bell Centre	COVID-19 pandemic in Canada
February 16, 2022	Toronto	Canada	Scotiabank Arena	COVID-19 pandemic in Canada

== Accolades ==
Award	Year (Note: Indicates the year of ceremony. Each year is linked to the article about the awards held that year, wherever possible.)	Category	Result	Ref.
Madison Square Garden	2022	Sold Out Award	Won	
Madison Square Garden	2022	Sold Out Award	Won	
Lanxess Arena	2022	Sold Out Award	Won	
The O2	2022	Sustainable First-time Award	Won	
People's Choice Awards	2023	Concert Tour of the Year	Nominated	
Ticketmaster Awards (Germany)	2023	International Live Act of the Year	Nominated	
Ticketmaster Awards (Netherlands)	2023	International Live Act of the Year	Nominated	
Ticketmaster Awards (Switzerland)	2023	Entertainment (2nd)	Won	
Ticketmaster Awards (UK)	2023	International Live Act of the Year	Nominated	
Pollstar Awards	2023	Pop Tour of the Year	Won	
Music Forward Foundation Awards	2023	Tour Honoree	Won	
