= Not My Responsibility =

2020 short film by Billie Eilish

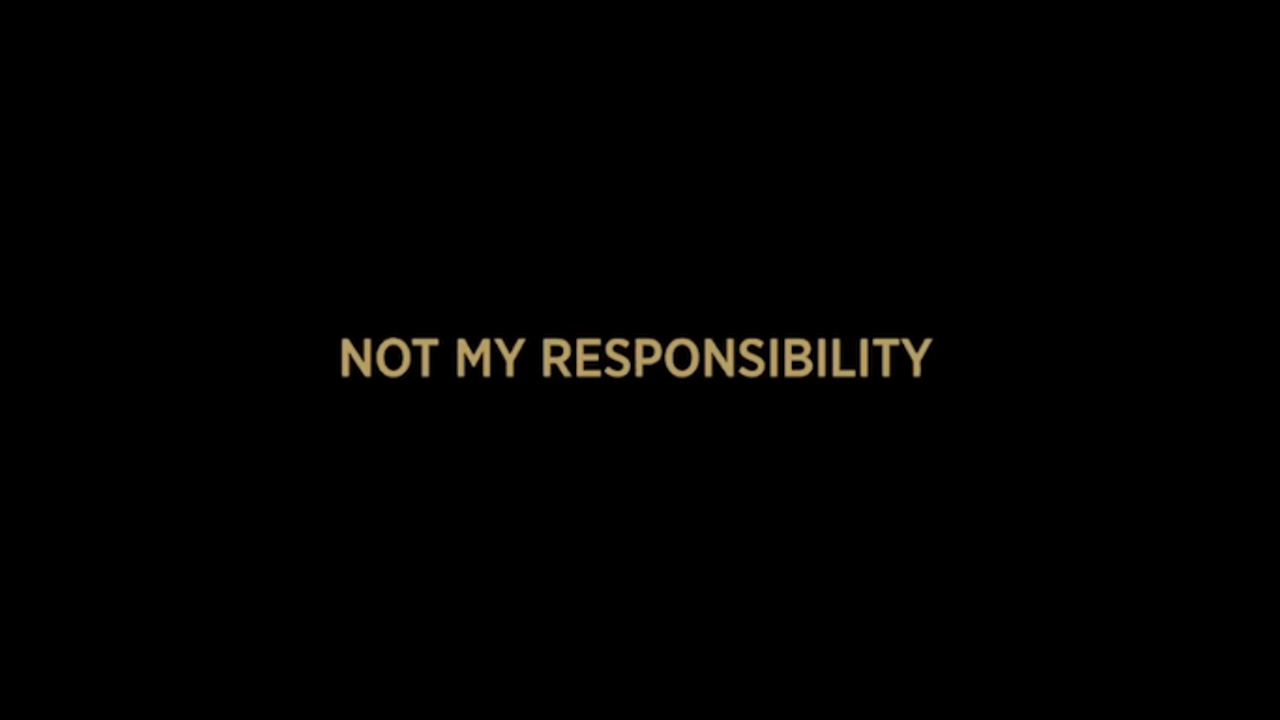
- Title card
- Written by: Billie Eilish
- Produced by: Billie Eilish
- Starring: Billie Eilish
- Release date: March 9, 2020 (Miami)
- Running time: 4 minutes
- Country: United States
- Language: English

Not My Responsibility is a 2020 American short film written and produced by singer-songwriter Billie Eilish. A commentary on body shaming and double standards placed upon young women's appearances, it features a monologue from Eilish about the media scrutiny surrounding her body. It is spoken-word and stars Eilish in a dark room, where she gradually undresses before submerging herself in a black substance.

The film premiered during Eilish's Where Do We Go? World Tour on March 9, 2020, as a concert interlude and was released online on May 26. Critics gave positive reviews, praising the commentary and tone, which they considered empowering. The audio was later included as a song on Eilish's second studio album, Happier Than Ever (2021). Some music journalists described it as the album's thematic centerpiece; others questioned its appearance on the tracklist, feeling that it lost its emotional impact without the visuals.

== Background and release ==
American singer-songwriter Billie Eilish released her debut studio album, When We All Fall Asleep, Where Do We Go?, in March 2019, to commercial success; it assisted her rise to widespread recognition. Her fashion style at the time, specifically her choice to wear baggy clothing, attracted public attention and scrutiny. She wore such clothes to avoid sexual objectification, being extremely conscious about her body as a teenager who had struggled with her self-image since 11 years old. Eilish faced several comments about how she was undesirable and unfeminine for her look and how she needed to "act like a woman" to be more attractive.

Upon turning 18 years old, Eilish thought about wearing less oversized clothes. She believed that her detractors would not stop shaming her body anyway, potentially being called a slut, a "fat cow", and a hypocrite who was selling her body, if she were to do so. In response, Eilish, who had been using her platform to spread body positivity and counter the culture of body shaming, wrote and produced the short film Not My Responsibility. It addresses misogynistic double standards placed upon young women's appearances, with focus towards public discussion around Eilish's body.

A spoken-word piece, Not My Responsibility premiered during the Miami date of her Where Do We Go? World Tour on March 9, 2020, as a concert interlude and was uploaded onto Eilish's YouTube channel on May 26. Uproxx music editor Derrick Rossignol wrote that, at the time of its release, the film marked Eilish's "biggest statement" about body shaming in her career.

== Synopsis ==
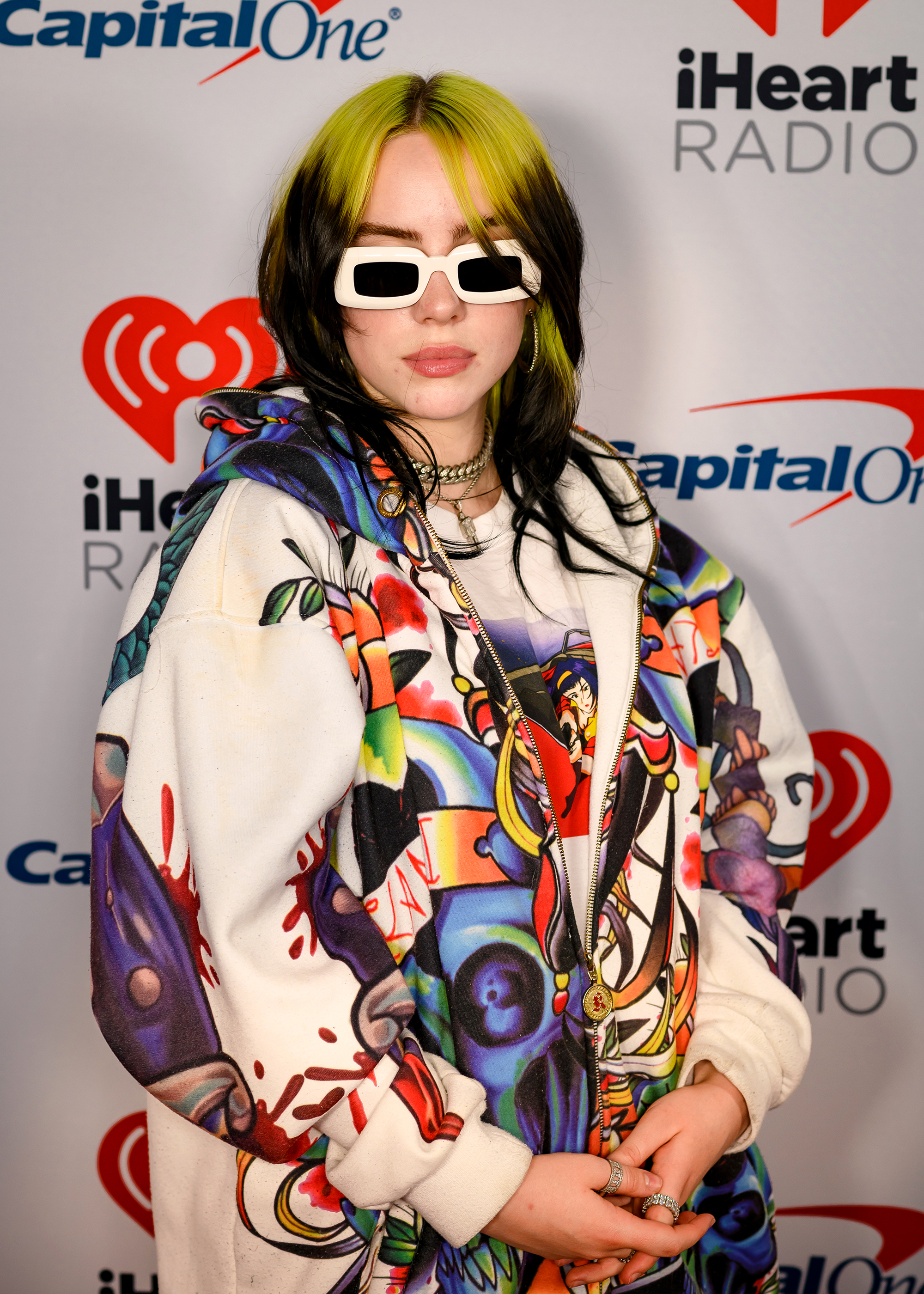
Billie Eilish in baggy clothing, 2020

Not My Responsibility is set in a dimly lit room and begins with Eilish in a black jacket. As electronic music plays in the background, she gradually undresses until she is in nothing but a necklace and a black sleeveless shirt. She takes off the shirt and reveals a black bra underneath. Slowly, Eilish submerges herself in a pool of black water and resurfaces, fully covered in the substance.

The film features commentary from Eilish while she undresses. She comments on the public discussion around her physical appearance and acknowledges the varying opinions people hold of her, but she questions whether they "really know" her enough to make assumptions about her body. She criticizes the way in which they decide her worth based on the assumptions in question. Eilish addresses the double standards she faces for wearing anything she likes: "If I wear what is comfortable, I am not a woman. If I shed the layers, I'm a slut." She concludes with the lines, "Is my value based only on your perception? Or is your opinion of me not my responsibility?"

== Critical reception ==
Not My Responsibility received praise from critics. Lars Brandle wrote for Billboard that Eilish got to demonstrate her "creative juices" with the visuals, and he commented positively on the background music. Other music journalists, including Althea Legaspi of Rolling Stone, Ruth Kinane of Entertainment Weekly, and Dorany Pineda of Los Angeles Times, found Not My Responsibility an effective, powerful takedown of sexist beauty standards.

Riley Runnells, a Paper author, praised Eilish's showcasing of her vulnerability through the film's thesis, whereas the zealous manner in which she depicted the sentiment was a point of praise for Carolyn Twersky of Seventeen. Teen Vogue's Laura Pitcher shared her empathy for Eilish's longstanding experience with body shaming. With the film, she felt inspired by Eilish's continued dedication to speak out against the misogynistic policing of how women look.

== As a song ==
"Not My Responsibility"

Song by Billie Eilish

from the album Happier Than Ever
- Released: July 30, 2021
- Genre: Spoken word; ambient; electropop
- Length: 3:47
- Label: Darkroom; Interscope
- Songwriters: Billie Eilish O'Connell; Finneas O'Connell
- Producer: Finneas

Lyric video
- "Not My Responsibility" on YouTube

The short film's audio appears as the ninth track of Eilish's second studio album, Happier Than Ever, released on July 30, 2021, through Darkroom and Interscope Records. The album's lyrical themes discuss the struggles that young women face in the entertainment industry: emotional abuse, power imbalance, and misogyny. In a Happier Than Ever commentary for Spotify, Eilish described the song's lyrics as "some of my favorite words that I've ever written", though she felt nobody paid attention to its message.

A spoken word, ambient, and electropop track that uses synthesizers, "Not My Responsibility" was written in part by Eilish; her older brother, Finneas O'Connell, receives co-writing and production credits. Dave Kutch and Rob Kinelski worked on the mastering and mixing, respectively. The song's instrumental was sampled to create the beat for the following album track, "Overheated", into which the music at the end of "Not My Responsibility" transitions.

Eilish performed "Not My Responsibility" as part of the Disney+ concert film Happier Than Ever: A Love Letter to Los Angeles, released on September 3, 2021. She also included it in the set list of a 2022–2023 world tour in support of Happier Than Ever. Upon the album's release, "Not My Responsibility" charted in four countries (Note: See the charts section for the exact peaks.) and peaked at number 125 of the Billboard Global 200.

=== Critical reception ===
Some critics considered "Not My Responsibility" to be Happier Than Ever's centerpiece. According to them, it exemplified the album's crucial motifs: the intense media gossip around Eilish as a young woman, as well as her reflection on its negative effects. Analyzing Happier Than Ever for Slate, Carl Wilson wrote that amid all the speculation about her personal life, "the focus on her body has clearly hit Eilish hardest". "Not My Responsibility", for Pitchfork's Quinn Moreland, sets the tone for the second half of the album, which deals with topics such as power dynamics, voyeurism, and sexuality. Sophie Williams of NME argued that its approach to Eilish's media scrutiny made it one of the "most powerful and haunting songs" in her discography.

In a review of Happier Than Ever for The A.V. Club, Alex McLevy wrote that "Not My Responsibility" felt more like a TED talk than a song that contained any artistry. Insider's Callie Ahgrim, while appreciating its commentary, felt that it could have been excluded from the tracklist. She believed that it lost its impact without the visuals from the short film—a sentiment that Moreland and McLevy echoed. Courteney Larocca, as a reply to Ahgrim, wrote: "slapping it haphazardly onto an official tracklist only evokes an eye-roll and a guarantee of pressing skip". Other critics described its lyrics as pretentious or excessive in the context of the album.

=== Credits and personnel ===
Credits are adapted from the liner notes of Happier Than Ever.

- Billie Eilish – vocals, vocal engineering, songwriting
- Finneas O'Connell – songwriting, production, engineering, vocal arranging, bass, drum programming, synthesizer
- Dave Kutch – mastering
- Rob Kinelski – mixing

=== Charts ===
Chart performance for "Not My Responsibility"
Chart (2021)	Peak position
Australia (ARIA)	99
Canada Hot 100 (Billboard)	98
Global 200 (Billboard)	125
Portugal (AFP)	107
US Bubbling Under Hot 100 (Billboard)	20
US Hot Rock & Alternative Songs (Billboard)	27

=== Certifications ===
Certifications for "Not My Responsibility"
Region	Certification	Certified units/sales
Australia (ARIA)	Gold	35,000^{‡}
Canada (Music Canada)	Gold	40,000^{‡}
Brazil (Pro-Música Brasil)	Platinum	40,000^{‡}
^{‡} Sales+streaming figures based on certification alone.
