= Happier Than Ever (song) =

2021 single by Billie Eilish

Single by Billie Eilish

from the album Happier Than Ever
- Written: 2019–2020
- Released: July 30, 2021
- Recorded: June 16, 2020
- Studio: Finneas' home studio
- Genre: Emo pop-punk
- Length: 4:58 (album version); 2:31 (single version)
- Label: Darkroom; Interscope
- Songwriters: Billie Eilish O'Connell; Finneas O'Connell
- Producer: Finneas

Billie Eilish singles chronology
"NDA" (2021)	"Happier Than Ever" (2021)	"Male Fantasy" (2021)

Music video
- "Happier Than Ever" on YouTube

"Happier Than Ever" is a song by American singer-songwriter Billie Eilish from her second studio album of the same name (2021). It was released as the album's sixth single on July 30, 2021, through Darkroom and Interscope Records. An emo pop-punk song, it is about Eilish's anger towards a former partner due to a toxic relationship. It opens with soft vocals backed by classical and bass guitars before it transitions into a more distorted punk sound. She wrote the song with its producer, Finneas O'Connell, after completing the American leg of her When We All Fall Asleep Tour (2019).

Upon release, many music journalists lauded "Happier Than Ever" as an album highlight. Critics praised Eilish's vocal performance, which they perceived as cathartic and louder than her previous work, as well as its rock-infused production. Multiple publications such as Billboard, Pitchfork, and Rolling Stone listed it as one of her best songs to date. At the 64th Annual Grammy Awards, it received four nominations, including Record of the Year and Song of the Year. It won Song of the Year at the 2022 MTV Video Music Awards. "Happier Than Ever" peaked at number 11 and number six on the US Billboard Hot 100 and Global 200 charts, respectively.

An accompanying music video for "Happier Than Ever" premiered the same day as the single's release. In it, Eilish performs the song through a telephone conversation, after which she climbs a rooftop and dances in the rain and ends it with screaming while lying on the roof. She performed the song live on The Tonight Show Starring Jimmy Fallon, Jimmy Kimmel Live!, and Saturday Night Live in 2021, and at the 2022 Coachella and Glastonbury festivals. Eilish included performances of it in a concert film and a world tour in support of the album.

== Background and development ==
Billie Eilish won five awards at the 62nd annual ceremony of the Grammy Awards for her first full-length album When We All Fall Asleep, Where Do We Go? (2019) and its single "Bad Guy". An avant-pop album with a horror-like atmosphere and whispery vocals, it debuted atop record charts in various countries and brought Eilish to mainstream fame. Her soft singing style became recognized as her signature sound.

In a January 2020 interview, Eilish stated she would begin working on her second studio album during the year. Her brother Finneas O'Connell confirmed this during a March 2020 interview, stating that it would be "pretty pure in its intention" and something that they would appreciate making and performing live. Eilish released the singles "My Future" and "Therefore I Am" in 2020. Eilish said in February 2021 that she had worked on 16 tracks for the project, and she cited self-reflection and life during the COVID-19 pandemic as her biggest inspirations. During a cover story for Rolling Stone, she prefaced that "almost none of the songs on this album are joyful".

"Happier Than Ever" was the first song Eilish and Finneas wrote for her second full-length album Happier Than Ever, initially titled "Away from Me". In the summer of 2019, after completing the American leg of her When We All Fall Asleep Tour, Eilish flew to Middelfart with Finneas. They wrote the melody for the song's first chorus on a cheap $80 guitar, and a lyric about a situation Eilish was going through: "When I'm away from you, I'm happier than ever." The two picked the song back up eight months later upon beginning work for the album, and completed it in May or June 2020. Finneas wanted the style to be dynamic and propel Eilish's emotionality instead of overshadowing it. He used plugins to add texture to the acoustic intro of "Happier Than Ever", and Eilish digitally edited her own vocal takes for its vocal programming.

The song was first used in the 2021 documentary film Billie Eilish: The World's a Little Blurry, revealing the lyrics "when I'm away from you, I'm happier than ever, wish I could explain it better. Wish it wasn't true". During an interview with NPR, Eilish commented that it was one of the most important songs she had written. She explained that the recording process felt like finding the best way to tell a person something she wished to tell them for a while: "You don't really know what you want to say or how to say it—and then maybe you have a conversation with somebody else, or you think a little bit about it, and you figure out what it is..."

== Composition and lyrics ==
"Happier Than Ever"
"Happier Than Ever" is a power ballad. In the third verse, the song transitions from a bass instrumentation into a distorted rock production with crashing snare drums and electric guitars as Eilish sings cathartically.

"Happier Than Ever" is a sentimental power ballad. Music journalists classified it as an emo pop-punk song. Others wrote that the song incorporates arena rock, alternative rock, grunge, and blue-eyed soul elements. Billboard writer Glenn Rowley described its musical style as "genre-shifting".

"Happier Than Ever" runs for 4 minutes and 58 seconds. The song opens with sparse acoustic instrumentation, as Eilish sings softly over a classical guitar. The bass in its second verse evokes annoyance according to MTV News's Athena Serrano. Around its third verse, "Happier Than Ever" transitions into a distorted pop-punk and rock production. During the stylistic change, crashing snare drums and electric guitars can be heard in the background. In an act of catharsis, Eilish continues the song by yelling some of its lyrics to express her pain, with a multitracking technique applied to her voice.

Multiple critics noted that Eilish's screams and Finneas's rock-infused production marked a significant departure from both of their previous musical styles. Lindsay Zoladz of The New York Times wrote that "Happier Than Ever" showcases Eilish at her loudest yet. Eilish described the song: "[It was] probably the most therapeutic song I've ever written or recorded, like ever, ever, ever, 'cause I just screamed my lungs out and could barely talk afterwards, which was very satisfying to me somehow. I had wanted to get those screams out for a very long time and it was very nice to."

According to a comment Eilish made on The World's a Little Blurry, "Happier Than Ever" is about "nothing even specific that they did, you’re just not happy being with them. You can't even explain it". Like other tracks in the album, the song's themes include growing up and healing as time passes. The lyrics to "Happier Than Ever" recount Eilish's experiences with an unhealthy, failed romantic relationship. The track is a "kiss-off" directed at her former partner, whom she condemns for committing several misdeeds—gaslighting her, showing up late to meetings with her, and driving home while drunk. The song begins with the gently delivered lines "When I'm away from you / I'm happier than ever", and it culminates with Eilish belting "just fucking leave me alone", before she then curses repeatedly over the outro.

== Release ==
Eilish teased an upcoming release in April 2021, posting "things are comingggg" on her Instagram account. On April 26, she released a 15-second long snippet of "Happier Than Ever" on her Instagram account, featuring visuals of her sitting in a chair with her back to the camera. DIY described the clip as "stripped-back", speculating that it is "welcoming Billie's brand new era". The song was released alongside the album on July 30, 2021, as its sixth single. An edit comprising only its second part was released for digital download and streaming on September 4, 2021, and a different radio edit which adds the chorus at the beginning of the song and the build up into the second half solicited to contemporary hit radio in Italy six days later.

== Reception ==
Many music reviewers lauded "Happier Than Ever" as the album's standout song. Critics who dubbed the song a highlight included Consequence's Mary Siroky, Pitchfork's Quinn Moreland, and Complex's Jessica McKinney. Jason Lipshutz, a staff editor for Billboard, thought that it "best captures the essence of the album" due to demonstrating Eilish's songwriting and vocal talents, which he believed was a defiance of traditional expectations from pop music. In an article for NME, El Hunt argued that Eilish's performance in the song offered powerful emotional impact and proved that her voice had improved throughout the years. Evaluating the album for Stereogum, Tom Breihan opined that "Happier Than Ever" provided it with the "only real moment of greatness, and he lamented that the rest of its tracks were not as vocally loud and cathartic. Insider's Callie Ahlgrim, who dubbed "Happier Than Ever" as the best song in Eilish's discography to date, shared a similar opinion: "Eilish fully casts aside her cool-girl exterior and just f---ing goes for it. I only wish she'd done that more."

The Line of Best Fit's Matthew Kent viewed the transition of "Happier Than Ever" as "the album's biggest surprise", and noted its second part as "not only a highlight of the album but a highlight of Eilish's entire discography thus far", which proved Eilish could achieve pop radio hits if she pleased. Tim Sentz of Beats Per Minute called the song a powerful "'S-tier' level Eilish track", and opined that, while Eilish sounds like she needs an exorcism, it perfectly captures her appeal and personality. Zoladz thought the song is the album's "most exhilarating moment" and a "disarmingly earnest torrent of bottled-up grievances", a full display of Eilish's versatility. Writing for The Guardian, Alexis Petridis deemed "Happier Than Ever" a "discomfiting and alienating" track, which gets nearest amongst the album tracks to replicating the "sonic firework display" of "Bury a Friend" (2019).

In 2022, Rolling Stone and NME ranked "Happier Than Ever" as Eilish's best song ever. The former magazine's Brittany Spanos stated that the song is "pure angst and a departure [from her] usually cool-headed" demeanor, and likened its beginning to a lamb and its outro to "a whole pack of lions". Thomas Smith of NME named it "the quintessential Billie Eilish song" and a "crowning glory of a song", which listeners would feel like singing "at the top of [their] lungs", but never quite be able to. For MTV Australia, Jackson Langford honed "Happier Than Ever" as her second-best song and a "volcanic outpour of anger and emotion", noting it replaced any previous release that may have contended as "the song that would define Billie Eilish's artistry and career". Uproxx's Rachel Brodsky placed the song 11th in Eilish's discography.

=== Rankings ===
Select year-end rankings for "Happier Than Ever"
Publication	Accolade	Rank	Ref.
American Songwriter	Top 22 Best Songs of 2021	N/A	
Billboard	Best Songs of 2021	9	
Coup De Main	The Best Songs of 2021	2	
DIY	The Best Tracks of 2021	5	
Entertainment Weekly	The 10 Best Songs of 2021	8	
The Fader	The 100 Best Songs of 2021	36	
Gigwise	20 Best Tracks of 2021	7	
NME	The 50 Best Songs of 2021	8	
Pitchfork	The 100 Best Songs of 2021	52	
The Ringer	The 11 Best Songs of 2021	6	
Rolling Stone	The 50 Best Songs of 2021	8	
Slant Magazine	The 50 Best Songs of 2021	42	
The Sydney Morning Herald	The 21 Best Songs of 2021	7	

Decade's-best listings for "Happier Than Ever"
Publication	List	Rank	Ref.
Pitchfork	The 100 Best Songs of the 2020s So Far	92	

In 2025, "Happier Than Ever" was listed at number 183 on Rolling Stone's Top 250 Greatest Songs of the 21st Century so far.

== Accolades ==
"Happier Than Ever" received several awards and nominations. The song was nominated for the MTV Video Music Award for Song of Summer in 2021, and Best Pop, Best Direction, Best Visual Effects, and Song of the Year at the 2022 ceremony, winning the latter. It additionally earned nominations for Best Music Video at the NME Awards 2022, and Record of the Year, Song of the Year, Best Music Video, and Best Pop Solo Performance at the 64th Annual Grammy Awards.

List of awards and nominations received by "Happier Than Ever"
Year	Award	Category	Result	Ref.
2021	MTV Video Music Awards	Song of Summer	Nominated	
2022	MTV Video Music Awards	Song of the Year	Won	
2022	MTV Video Music Awards	Best Pop	Nominated	
2022	MTV Video Music Awards	Best Direction	Nominated	
2022	MTV Video Music Awards	Best Visual Effects	Nominated	
2022	NME Awards	Best Music Video	Nominated	
2022	Grammy Awards	Record of the Year	Nominated	
2022	Grammy Awards	Song of the Year	Nominated	
2022	Grammy Awards	Best Music Video	Nominated	
2022	Grammy Awards	Best Pop Solo Performance	Nominated	
2022	Nickelodeon Kids' Choice Awards	Favorite Song	Won	

== Commercial performance ==
"Happier Than Ever" debuted at its peak position of number 11 on the US Billboard Hot 100 chart issue for August 14, 2021, spending 26 weeks on the chart. It topped the US Hot Rock & Alternative Songs chart, becoming her second number-one there after "My Future". This made Eilish the second woman to have multiple number-one songs on the chart, with Taylor Swift as the first. The song charted at number six on the Canadian Hot 100, Eilish's seventh to reach the top 10. It peaked at number four on the UK Singles Chart in the United Kingdom, and earned a Platinum certification from the British Phonographic Industry in March 2022. In Australia, "Happier Than Ever" reached number three on the ARIA Singles Chart, becoming Eilish's 13th song to make the top 10. The Australian Recording Industry Association certified it 4× Platinum in 2023. The song charted at number four on the New Zealand Singles Chart, giving Eilish her 12th top-10 in New Zealand. "Happier Than Ever" received a Platinum certification from Recorded Music NZ in September 2022.

Elsewhere, the song peaked within the top 10 of national record charts: number 2 in Malaysia; number 3 in Ireland; number 4 in Greece; number 5 in Norway, and Singapore; number 6 in Portugal; number 8 in both Lithuania and South Africa; and number 10 in both Hungary and Slovakia; It earned a 3× Platinum certification in Portugal, 2× Platinum in Spain, Platinum in Denmark, France, Greece, and Italy, and Gold in Belgium. Worldwide, "Happier Than Ever" entered at number 6 and number 8 on the Global 200 and the Global Excl. US, respectively—its peak positions in those charts. During its opening week, it earned 36.6 million streams from outside the US.

== Music video ==
Eilish directed the music video for "Happier Than Ever", which accompanied its release. She announced it on Instagram: "This is my favorite ... video ever." The video comprises two parts. In the former, Eilish walks back and forth in a glitzy room and performs the song over a vintage landline telephone, to a former partner. In the second part, she opens the door and water rushes in. It ends with Eilish dancing on the roof mid-downpour and being completely submerged into the water. Vulture's Justin Curto described it as "a flood of emotion to match that glorious guitar breakdown". Ellie Robinson of NME praised the video as a "poignant film clip", and Billboard's Hannah Dailey opined its transition encapsulates breaking in the "facade of serenity" and that "instead of cowering there, she embraces the wrath of the storm".

== Live performances ==
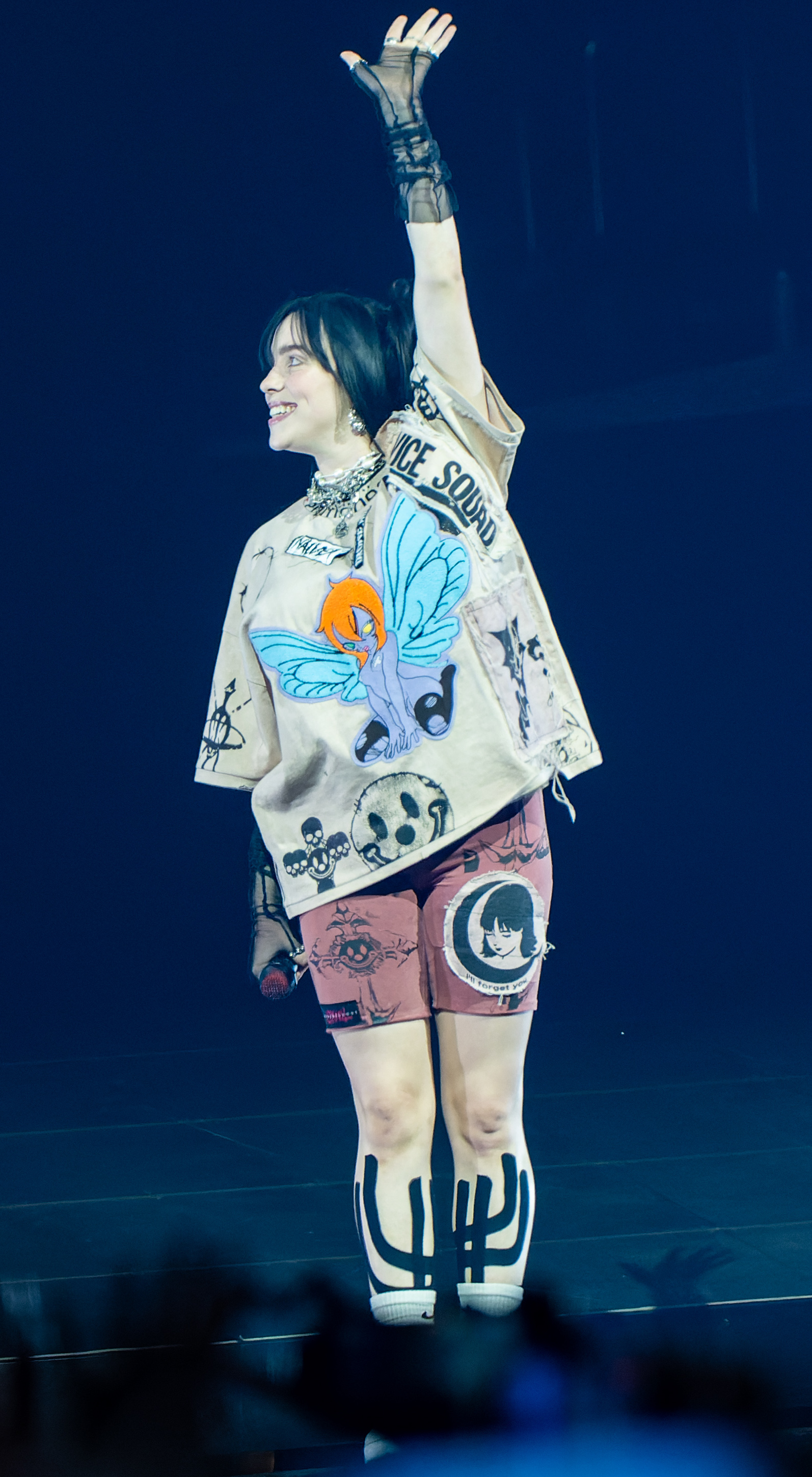
Eilish included "Happier Than Ever" in the setlist for a 2022–2023 world tour in support of the album.

The first live performance of "Happier Than Ever" occurred at The Tonight Show Starring Jimmy Fallon on August 10, 2021. Eilish sang in front of clouds and flashing lights that gave the impression of a storm, joined by a drummer and Finneas on the guitar. She and Finneas reprised "Happier Than Ever" for Jimmy Kimmel Live! on top of The Hollywood Roosevelt Hotel on October 14, and at Saturday Night Live on December 11, where they performed it alongside "Male Fantasy" (2021). Eilish was accompanied by the fictional character Count von Count during a numbers-themed rendition of the song for Sesame Street, which premiered on November 9, 2021. The following month, she visited the World Cafe radio program to sing "Happier Than Ever" alongside three other tracks from the album: "Billie Bossa Nova", "Goldwing", and "Halley's Comet".

Eilish included a performance of the song in her concert film Happier Than Ever: A Love Letter to Los Angeles, released to Disney+ on September 3, 2021. She added it as the final song of the set list of a 2022–2023 world tour, which started on February 3, 2022, in New Orleans, Louisiana, at Smoothie King Center and finished on September 30, 2022, at Perth Arena, in support of the album, and sang the song as a closing number on April 16 for that year's Coachella festival, amid gusts of wind from a dust storm. The next week at Coachella, she paired up with Hayley Williams, the vocalist of the band Paramore. Finneas accompanied the two as they performed Paramore's "Misery Business" (2007), followed by "Happier Than Ever". On June 24, 2022, Eilish headlined the year's Glastonbury Festival in the UK, becoming the youngest artist to do so. She concluded her appearance with a live rendition of "Happier Than Ever", accompanied by pyrotechnics.

At the 64th Annual Grammy Awards, Eilish performed the song live with Finneas. She began by singing inside an upside-down model of a house, donning a shirt which paid tribute to Taylor Hawkins, who had died earlier in the week. Eilish climbed atop the roof and banged her head while Finneas played the guitar; the performance concluded with thunder and lightning striking as rain poured down the stage. USA Today's Marco della Cava listed it among the night's most memorable moments, and the staff of The New York Times complimented Eilish's vocals and described the performance as "too raw to feel petty", noting that it "injected some much-needed feeling into the first half of the show". On July 30, 2022, in celebration of the album's one-year anniversary, Eilish and Finneas headed for the Amoeba Music record store in Hollywood to perform "Happier Than Ever", along with three other songs.

== Cover versions ==
Kelly Clarkson performed a live cover of "Happier Than Ever" on The Kelly Clarkson Show on September 30, 2021. Its studio version, released on May 25, 2022, was later used as the lead single from her seventh extended play Kellyoke (2022). Canadian singer Shawn Mendes and Japanese-British singer-songwriter Rina Sawayama covered the song for BBC Radio 1 Live Lounge in 2021 and 2022, respectively. Mendes sang its first half with mellow vocals while playing an acoustic guitar, and the rest on an electric guitar with fervid vocal runs and high notes, while Sawayama performed an alt-rock version she described as "a little darker ... [and] moodier" than Eilish's original version. Black Country, New Road did a cover of "Happier Than Ever" at a concert on September 5, 2022.

== Credits and personnel ==
- Billie Eilish O'Connell – vocals, songwriting, vocal engineering
- Finneas O'Connell – songwriting, production, bass, drum programming, electric guitar, engineering, nylon-string guitar, percussion, programming, synthesizer, vocal arrangement
- Dave Kutch – mastering
- Rob Kinelski – mixing
- Casey Cuayo – mixing assistant
- Eli Heisler – mixing assistant

== Charts ==
=== Weekly charts ===
Weekly chart performance for "Happier Than Ever"
Chart (2021–2022)	Peak position
Australia (ARIA)	3
Austria (Ö3 Austria Top 40)	12
Belgium (Ultratop 50 Flanders)	28
Canada Hot 100 (Billboard)	6
Canada CHR/Top 40 (Billboard)	21
Canada Hot AC (Billboard)	43
Czech Republic Singles Digital (ČNS IFPI)	12
Denmark (Tracklisten)	11
Finland (Suomen virallinen lista)	11
France (SNEP)	39
Germany (GfK)	23
Global 200 (Billboard)	6
Greece International (IFPI)	4
Hungary (Single Top 40)	15
Hungary (Stream Top 40)	10
Iceland (Tónlistinn)	11
Ireland (IRMA)	3
Italy (FIMI)	53
Japan Hot Overseas (Billboard)	5
Lebanon (Lebanese Top 20)	15
Lithuania (AGATA)	8
Malaysia International (RIM)	2
Netherlands (Single Top 100)	15
New Zealand (Recorded Music NZ)	4
Norway (VG-lista)	5
Philippines (Billboard)	16
Portugal (AFP)	6
Singapore (RIAS)	5
Slovakia (Singles Digitál Top 100)	10
South Africa (RISA)	8
Spain (Promusicae)	60
Sweden (Sverigetopplistan)	13
Switzerland (Schweizer Hitparade)	13
UK Singles (Official Charts)	4
US Billboard Hot 100	11
US Adult Pop Airplay (Billboard)	38
US Hot Rock & Alternative Songs (Billboard)	1
US Pop Airplay (Billboard)	13

=== Year-end charts ===
2021 year-end chart performance for "Happier Than Ever"
Chart (2021)	Position
Australia (ARIA)	39
Austria (Ö3 Austria Top 40)	52
Canada (Canadian Hot 100)	53
Global 200 (Billboard)	82
Hungary (Stream Top 40)	39
Iceland (Tónlistinn)	58
Ireland (IRMA)	34
Netherlands (Single Top 100)	98
New Zealand (Recorded Music NZ)	45
Portugal (AFP)	47
Switzerland (Schweizer Hitparade)	71
UK Singles (OCC)	55
US Billboard Hot 100	94
US Hot Rock & Alternative Songs (Billboard)	11

2022 year-end chart performance for "Happier Than Ever"
Chart (2022)	Position
Australia (ARIA)	32
Belgium (Ultratop 50 Flanders)	159
Brazil (Pro-Música Brasil)	164
Global 200 (Billboard)	21
Iceland (Tónlistinn)	78
Lithuania (AGATA)	42
New Zealand (Recorded Music NZ)	36
UK Singles (OCC)	68
US Hot Rock & Alternative Songs (Billboard)	8
US Mainstream Top 40 (Billboard)	49
US Streaming Songs (Billboard)	68

2023 year-end chart performance for "Happier Than Ever"
Chart (2023)	Position
Global 200 (Billboard)	190

== Certifications ==
Certifications and sales for "Happier Than Ever"
Region	Certification	Certified units/sales
Australia (ARIA)	5× Platinum	350,000^{‡}
Austria (IFPI Austria)	2× Platinum	60,000^{‡}
Belgium (BRMA)	Gold	20,000^{‡}
Brazil (Pro-Música Brasil)	3× Diamond	480,000^{‡}
Canada (Music Canada)	6× Platinum	480,000^{‡}
Denmark (IFPI Danmark)	Platinum	90,000^{‡}
France (SNEP)	Diamond	333,333^{‡}
Germany (BVMI)	Gold	200,000^{‡}
Italy (FIMI)	Platinum	100,000^{‡}
Mexico (AMPROFON)	3× Platinum	420,000^{‡}
New Zealand (RMNZ)	5× Platinum	150,000^{‡}
Poland (ZPAV)	3× Platinum	150,000^{‡}
Portugal (AFP)	3× Platinum	30,000^{‡}
Spain (Promusicae)	2× Platinum	120,000^{‡}
United Kingdom (BPI)	2× Platinum	1,200,000^{‡}
Streaming
Greece (IFPI Greece)	Platinum	2,000,000^{†}
Sweden (GLF)	Gold	6,000,000^{†}
^{‡} Sales+streaming figures based on certification alone.^{†} Streaming-only figures based on certification alone.

== Release history ==
Release dates and formats for "Happier Than Ever"
Region	Date	Format(s)	Version	Label(s)	Ref.
United States	August 17, 2021	Contemporary hit radio	Original	Darkroom	
France	August 26, 2021	Radio airplay	Original	Universal	
Various	September 4, 2021	Digital download; streaming	Edit	Darkroom; Interscope	
Italy	September 10, 2021	Radio airplay	Radio edit	Universal	

== See also ==
- List of UK top-ten singles in 2021
- List of top 10 singles in 2021 (Ireland)
- List of top 10 singles for 2021 in Australia
- List of Platinum singles in the United Kingdom awarded since 2000
