= List of Billie Eilish live performances =

Billie Eilish live performances
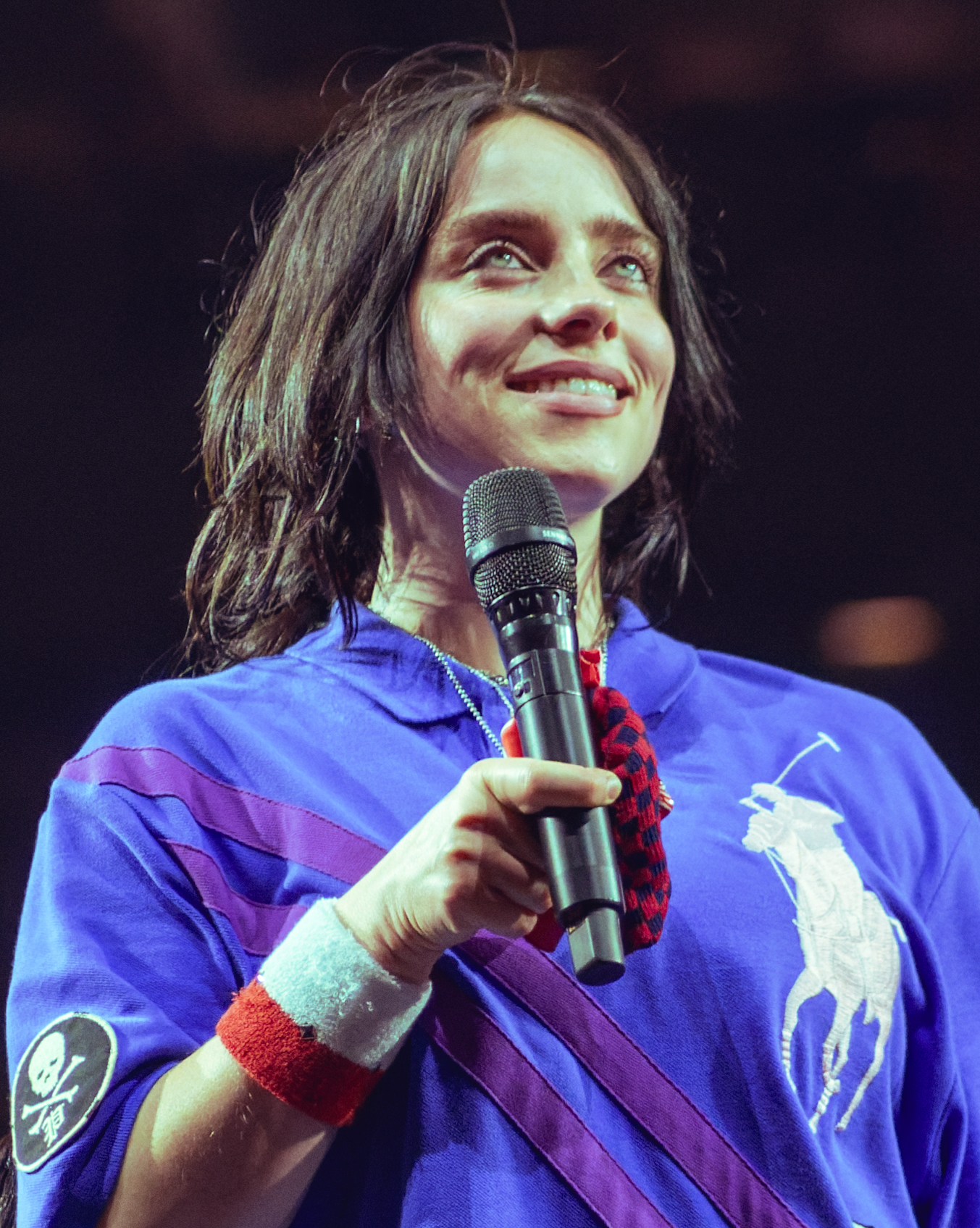
- Billie Eilish performing on Hit Me Hard And Soft: The Tour in 2025
- Concert tours: 7
- One-off concerts: 29
- Festivals: 79
- Award shows: 14
- TV shows and specials: 22
- Radio shows and specials: 17
- Other performances: 64

American singer-songwriter Billie Eilish has headlined seven concert tours since her debut single, "Ocean Eyes". Over the years, Eilish has also performed at numerous festivals, television events, and award shows.

Eilish's first arena tour was supposed to be the Where Do We Go? World Tour, but after playing only three shows, the tour had to be canceled due to the COVID-19 pandemic in 2020. Two years later, she returned with Happier Than Ever, The World Tour to promote her second studio album. The tour was a success, grossing over $131 million from 79 shows across five continents. During this tour, Eilish became the youngest person to headline the Coachella Festival and Glastonbury Festival, both at age 20. In 2024, Eilish embarked on her seventh headlining tour, Hit Me Hard and Soft: The Tour, to promote her third studio album, Hit Me Hard and Soft.

== Concert tours ==
=== Headlining ===
Title	Dates	Associated album	Continent(s)	Shows
Don't Smile at Me Tour	October 4, 2017 – November 2, 2017	Don't Smile at Me	Europe; North America	17
Where's My Mind Tour	February 14, 2018 – April 7, 2018	Don't Smile at Me	Europe; North America	28
1 by 1 Tour	October 20, 2018 – March 9, 2019	Don't Smile at Me	Europe; North America	44
When We All Fall Asleep Tour	April 13, 2019 – November 17, 2019	When We All Fall Asleep, Where Do We Go?	Europe; North America; Oceania	66
Where Do We Go? World Tour	March 9, 2020 – March 12, 2020	When We All Fall Asleep, Where Do We Go?	North America	3
Happier Than Ever, The World Tour	February 3, 2022 – April 2, 2023	Happier Than Ever	Asia; Europe; North America; Oceania; South America	88
Hit Me Hard and Soft: The Tour	September 29, 2024 – November 23, 2025	Hit Me Hard and Soft	Asia; Europe; North America; Oceania	106

=== As opening act ===
Title	Dates	Headlining artist(s)	Country	Ref(s)
High as Hope Tour	October 2 – October 3, 2018	Florence and the Machine	United States	

== One-off concerts ==
Date	Event	City	Country	Venue	Performed song(s)	Ref.
March 11, 2016	—N/a	Los Angeles	United States	The Hi Hat	—N/a	
April 14, 2016	—N/a	Los Angeles	United States	Hotel Café	—N/a	
August 25, 2016	—N/a	Los Angeles	United States	The Hi Hat	—N/a	
September 13, 2016	—N/a	Los Angeles	United States	Tenants of the Trees	"Bellyache"; "Another Stupid Song" (unreleased song); "Ocean Eyes"; "Hostage"; "My Boy"; "Party Favor"; "Six Feet Under" (Note: Set list may not be complete.)	
October 10, 2016	School Night	Los Angeles	United States	Bardot	"Six Feet Under"; "My Boy"; "True Blue" (unreleased song); "Party Favor"; "Bellyache"; "Hostage"; "Ocean Eyes"	
July 10, 2017	—N/a (Note: Eilish's first headlining show.)	London	England	The Courtyard Theatre	"Bellyache"; "Six Feet Under"; "Copycat"; "Idontwannabeyouanymore"; "Watch"; "Party Favor"; "Bored"; "My Boy"; "Hostage"; "Ocean Eyes"	
August 10, 2017	Don't Smile at Me Release Party	Los Angeles	United States	The Hi Hat	"Bellyache"; "Copycat"; "True Blue" (unreleased song); "Idontwannabeyouanymore"; "Watch"; "Party Favor"; "Bored"; "Ocean Eyes"; "My Boy"	
August 16, 2017	—N/a	New York City	United States	Mercury Lounge	"Idontwannabeyouanymore"; "Ocean Eyes"; "8" (unreleased at the time); "Bored" (Note: Set lits incomplete.)	
September 11, 2017	—N/a	Auckland	New Zealand	The Tuning Fork	"Bellyache"; "Six Feet Under"; "Copycat"; "Idontwannabeyouanymore"; "Watch"; "Hotline Bling" (Drake cover); "Party Favor"; "Bored"; "Limbo" (unreleased song); "My Boy"; "Hostage"; "Ocean Eyes"	
September 14, 2017	—N/a	Sydney	Australia	Lansdowne Hotel	"Copycat"; "Idontwannabeyouanymore"; "Watch"; "Six Feet Under"; "Hotline Bling" (Drake cover); "Party Favor"; "Bored"; "Listen Before I Go"(unreleased at the time); "My Boy"; "Hostage"; "Ocean Eyes"; "Bellyache"	
September 15, 2017	—N/a	Melbourne	Australia	The Toff in Town	"Copycat"; "Idontwannabeyouanymore"; "Watch"; "Six Feet Under"; "Hotline Bling" (Drake cover); "Party Favor"; "Bored"; "Listen Before I Go"(unreleased at the time); "My Boy"; "Hostage"; "Ocean Eyes"; "Bellyache"	
November 15, 2017	Billie Eilish Performance and Meet + Greet (Note: Special event to celebrate the release of Don't Smile at Me.)	Los Angeles	United States	Space 15 Twenty	—N/a	
January 30, 2018	2018 Laneway Festival sideshows	Auckland	New Zealand	The Tuning Fork	"Bellyache"; "Idontwannabeyouanymore"; "Watch"; "&Burn"; "Bored"; "Six Feet Under"; "Hotline Bling" (Drake cover); "Party Favor"; "When the Party's Over"(unreleased at the time); "Copycat"; "Ocean Eyes"; "Hostage"; "My Boy"	
February 6, 2018	2018 Laneway Festival sideshows	Sydney	Australia	Oxford Art Factory	"Bellyache"; "Idontwannabeyouanymore"; "Watch"; "&Burn"; "Bored"; "Six Feet Under"; "Hotline Bling" (Drake cover); "Party Favor"; "When the Party's Over"(unreleased at the time); "Ocean Eyes"; "My Boy"; "Hostage"; "Copycat"	
February 8, 2018	2018 Laneway Festival sideshows	Melbourne	Australia	Howler	"Bellyache"; "Idontwannabeyouanymore"; "Watch"; "&Burn"; "Bored"; "Six Feet Under"; "Hotline Bling" (Drake cover); "Party Favor"; "When the Party's Over"(unreleased at the time); "Ocean Eyes"; "My Boy"; "Hostage"; "Copycat"	
February 15, 2018	Annie Mac's AMP Sounds 2018	London	England	The Jazz Cafe	"Six Feet Under"; "Hotline Bling" (Drake cover); "Party Favor" (Note: Set list incomplete.)	
April 2, 2018	Scope Productions Presents: Billie Eilish	Iowa City	United States	Iowa Memorial Union Ballroom	"Hotline Bling" (Drake cover); "Copycat" (Note: Set list incomplete.)	
June 6, 2018	—N/a	Cleveland	United States	House of Blues	"Bellyache"; "Idontwannabeyouanymore"; "Watch"; "&Burn"; "Bored"; "Six Feet Under"; "Hotline Bling" (Drake cover); "Party Favor"; "When the Party's Over"(unreleased at the time); "Ocean Eyes"; "My Boy"; "Hostage"; "Copycat"	
June 7, 2018	—N/a	Indianapolis	United States	Egyptian Room at Old National Centre	"Bellyache"; "Idontwannabeyouanymore"; "Watch"; "&Burn"; "Bored"; "Six Feet Under"; "Hotline Bling" (Drake cover); "Party Favor"; "When the Party's Over"(unreleased at the time); "Ocean Eyes"; "Lovely"; "My Boy"; "Hostage"; "Copycat"	
August 1, 2018	101 WKQX Official Lollapalooza Aftershow	Chicago	United States	House of Blues	"Bellyache"; "Six Feet Under" (Note: Set list incomplete.)	
August 15, 2018	—N/a	Seoul	South Korea	Yes24 Live Hall	"Bellyache"; "Idontwannabeyouanymore"; "Watch"; "&Burn"; "Bored"; "Six Feet Under"; "Bitches Broken Hearts"; "Hotline Bling" (Drake cover); "Party Favor"; "When the Party's Over"(unreleased at the time); "You Should See Me in a Crown"; "Lovely"; "Ocean Eyes"; "My Boy"; "Hostage"; "Copycat"	
August 22, 2018 (Note: Originally scheduled to be held on August 23rd.)	—N/a	Honolulu	United States	The Republik	—N/a	
October 4, 2018	—N/a	Norfolk	United States	The NorVa	"Bellyache"; "Idontwannabeyouanymore"; "Watch"; "&Burn"; "Bored"; "Six Feet Under"; "Bitches Broken Hearts"; "Hotline Bling" (Drake cover); "Party Favor"; "When the Party's Over"(unreleased at the time); "You Should See Me in a Crown"; "Lovely"; "Ocean Eyes"; "My Boy"; "Hostage"; "Copycat"	
November 6, 2019	Billie's exclusive concert at Third Man Records	Nashville	United States	The Blue Room at Third Man Records	"Wish You Were Gay"; "All the Good Girls Go to Hell"; "Ocean Eyes"; "Bad Guy"; "Idontwannabeyouanymore"; "Bury a Friend"; "Come Out and Play"; "Copycat"; "I Love You"; "Bellyache"; "When the Party's Over"	
October 24, 2020	Where Do We Go? The Livestream	—N/a (Note: This concert was held online.)			"Bury a Friend"; "You Should See Me in a Crown"; "My Strange Addiction"; "Ocean Eyes"; "Xanny"; "I Love You"; "Ilomilo"; "No Time to Die"; "When the Party's Over"; "All the Good Girls Go to Hell"; "Everything I Wanted"; "My Future"; "Bad Guy"	
June 1, 2022	Exclusive Acoustic Performance for Telekom Electronic Beats	Bonn	Germany	Telekom Forum	"Everything I Wanted"; "Billie Bossa Nova"; "Hostage"; "Idontwannabeyouanymore"; "When the Party's Over"; "Getting Older"; "I Love You"; "Your Power"; "Male Fantasy"; "Ocean Eyes"; "Bad Guy"; "Happier Than Ever"	
July 29, 2022	1 year anniversary of Happier Than Ever	Los Angeles	United States	Amoeba Hollywood	"Billie Bossa Nova"; "TV"; "Getting Older"; "Happier Than Ever"	
March 29, 2023	—N/a (Note: This show was originally part of the Happier Than Ever, The World Tour, but had to be canceled due to bad weather condition, so Eilish made a special acoustic performance for the audience in attendance. The show was rescheduled to March 30.)	Mexico City	Mexico	Foro Sol	"Ocean Eyes"; "When the Party's Over"; "Everything I Wanted"; "TV"; "Lovely"; "Happier Than Ever"	
August 29, 2023	One Night Only in London	London	England	Electric Ballroom	"Bury a Friend"; "I Didn't Change My Number"; "Therefore I Am"; "My Strange Addiction"; "Idontwannabeyouanymore"; "Lovely"; "Xanny"; "You Should See Me in a Crown"; "Bitches Broken Hearts"; "What Was I Made For?"; "Oxytocin" / "Copycat"; "Ilomilo"; "I Love You"; "Your Power"; "My Boy"; "Bellyache"; "Ocean Eyes"; "Never Felt So Alone" (with Labrinth); "Wish You Were Gay"; "When The Party's Over" (with Boygenius); "Everything I Wanted"; "Bad Guy"; "Happier Than Ever"; "Goodbye"	

== Music Festivals ==
Date	Festival	City	Country	Performed song(s)	Ref.
March 4, 2017	CRSSD Festival	San Diego	United States	—N/a	
March 16, 2017	South by Southwest	Austin	United States	"Bellyache"; "Six Feet Under"; "Party Favor"; "Copycat"; "Bored"; "Ocean Eyes"; "Idontwannabeyouanymore" (Note: Set list incomplete.)	
January 27, 2018	Laneway Festival	Central Area	Singapore	"Bellyache"; "Idontwannabeyouanymore"; "Watch"; "Six Feet Under"; "Hotline Bling" (Drake cover); "Party Favor"; "Bored"; "Copycat"; "Hostage"; "Ocean Eyes"; "My Boy"	
January 29, 2018	Laneway Festival	Auckland	New Zealand	—N/a	
February 2, 2018	Laneway Festival	Adelaide	Australia	"Bellyache"; "Idontwannabeyouanymore"; "Watch"; "Bored"; "Six Feet Under"; "Hotline Bling" (Drake cover); "Party Favor"; "My Boy"; "Ocean Eyes"; "Copycat"	
February 3, 2018	Laneway Festival	Melbourne	Australia	"Bellyache"; "Idontwannabeyouanymore"; "Watch"; "Bored"; "Six Feet Under"; "Hotline Bling" (Drake cover); "Party Favor"; "My Boy"; "Ocean Eyes"; "Copycat"	
February 4, 2018	Laneway Festival	Sydney	Australia	"Bellyache"; "Idontwannabeyouanymore"; "Watch"; "Bored"; "Six Feet Under"; "Hotline Bling" (Drake cover); "Party Favor"; "My Boy"; "Ocean Eyes"; "Copycat"	
February 10, 2018	Laneway Festival	Brisbane	Australia	"Bellyache"; "Idontwannabeyouanymore"; "Watch"; "Six Feet Under"; "Hotline Bling" (Drake cover); "Party Favor"; "Bored"; "Copycat"; "Hostage"; "Ocean Eyes"; "My Boy"	
February 11, 2018	Laneway Festival	Fremantle	Australia	"Bellyache"; "Idontwannabeyouanymore"; "Watch"; "Bored"; "Six Feet Under"; "Hotline Bling" (Drake cover); "Party Favor"; "My Boy"; "Ocean Eyes"; "Copycat"	
March 3, 2018	Okeechobee Music & Arts Festival	Okeechobee	United States	"Bellyache"; "Idontwannabeyouanymore"; "Watch"; "Bored"; "Six Feet Under"; "New Girl" (performed by Finneas); "Party Favor"; "When the Party's Over" (unreleased at the time); "Ocean Eyes"; "My Boy"; "Hostage"; "Copycat"	
March 13, 2018	South by Southwest (SXSW)	Austin	United States	"Bellyache"; "Six Feet Under"; "Copycat"; "Hotline Bling" (Drake cover); "Party Favor"; "Ocean Eyes" (Note: Set list incomplete.)	
March 14, 2018 (5:15 pm)	South by Southwest (SXSW)	Austin	United States	—N/a	
March 14, 2018 (11 pm)	South by Southwest (SXSW)	Austin	United States	"Copycat"; "Idontwannabeyouanymore"; "Watch"; "Hotline Bling" (Drake cover); "Party Favor"; "When the Party's Over" (unreleased at the time); "Ocean Eyes"; "My Boy"; "Bellyache"	
March 15, 2018 (9 pm)	South by Southwest (SXSW)	Austin	United States	—N/a	
March 15, 2018 (12 am)	South by Southwest (SXSW)	Austin	United States	"Bellyache"; "Six Feet Under"; "Party Favor"; "Copycat"; "Bored"; "Ocean Eyes"	
March 16, 2018	South by Southwest (SXSW)	Austin	United States	"Bellyache"; "Copycat"; "Ocean Eyes"; "My Boy"	
April 21, 2018	WSU Springfest 2018	Pullman	United States	—N/a	
June 3, 2018	Governors Ball	New York City	United States	"Bellyache"; "Idontwannabeyouanymore"; "Watch" / "&Burn"; "Bitches Broken Hearts"; "Hotline Bling" (Drake cover); "Party Favor"; "Ocean Eyes"; "Lovely" (with Khalid); "My Boy"; "Copycat"	
June 9, 2018	Bonnaroo	Manchester	United States	"Bellyache"; "Idontwannabeyouanymore"; "Watch" / "&Burn"; "Bored"; "Six Feet Under"; "Bitches Broken Hearts"; "New Girl" (performed by Finneas); "Hotline Bling" (Drake cover); "Party Favor"; "Ocean Eyes"; "Lovely"; "My Boy"; "Hostage"; "Copycat"	
June 30, 2018	Agenda Festival	Long Beach	United States	—N/a	
July 28, 2018	Mo Pop Festival	Detroit	United States	"Bellyache"; "Idontwannabeyouanymore"; "&Burn"; "Bored"; "Bitches Broken Hearts"; "Hotline Bling" (Drake cover); "Party Favor"; "You Should See Me in a Crown" (Live debut); "Ocean Eyes"; "Lovely"; "My Boy"; "Copycat"	
August 2, 2018	Lollapalooza	Chicago	United States	"Bellyache"; "Idontwannabeyouanymore"; "&Burn"; "Bitches Broken Hearts"; "You Should See Me in a Crown"; "Hotline Bling" (Drake cover); "Party Favor"; "Lovely"; "Ocean Eyes"; "My Boy"; "Copycat"	
August 4, 2018	Osheaga Festival	Montreal	Canada	"Bellyache"; "Idontwannabeyouanymore"; "&Burn"; "Bored"; "Six Feet Under"; "Bitches Broken Hearts"; "New Girl" (performed by Finneas); "Hotline Bling" (Drake cover); "Party Favor"; "You Should See Me in a Crown"; "Lovely"; "Ocean Eyes"; "My Boy"; "Hostage"; "Copycat"	
August 10, 2018	Outside Lands	San Francisco	United States	"Bellyache"; "Idontwannabeyouanymore"; "&Burn"; "Bored"; "Bitches Broken Hearts"; "New Girl" (performed by Finneas); "Hotline Bling" (Drake cover); "Party Favor"; "You Should See Me in a Crown"; "Lovely"; "Ocean Eyes"; "My Boy"; "Hostage"; "Copycat"	
August 18, 2018	Summer Sonic Festival	Tokyo	Japan	"Bellyache"; "Idontwannabeyouanymore"; "&Burn"; "Bored"; "Bitches Broken Hearts"; "Hotline Bling" (Drake cover); "You Should See Me in a Crown"; "Lovely"; "Ocean Eyes"; "My Boy"; "Copycat"	
August 19, 2018	Summer Sonic Festival	Osaka	Japan	"Bellyache"; "Idontwannabeyouanymore"; "Watch" / "&Burn"; "Bored"; "Six Feet Under"; "Bitches Broken Hearts"; "Hotline Bling" (Drake cover); "Party Favor"; "When the Party's Over" (unreleased at the time); "You Should See Me in a Crown"; "Lovely"; "Ocean Eyes"; "My Boy"; "Hostage"; "Copycat"	
September 16, 2018	Music Midtown	Atlanta	United States	"Bellyache"; "Idontwannabeyouanymore"; "&Burn"; "Bored"; "Bitches Broken Hearts"; "Hotline Bling" (Drake cover); "Party Favor"; "You Should See Me in a Crown"; "Lovely"; "Ocean Eyes"; "My Boy"; "Hostage"; "Copycat"	
October 6, 2018	All Things Go Music Festival	Washington, D.C.	United States	"Bellyache"; "Idontwannabeyouanymore"; "Watch" / "&Burn"; "Bored"; "Six Feet Under"; "Bitches Broken Hearts"; "Hotline Bling" (Drake cover); "Party Favor"; "When the Party's Over" (unreleased at the time); "You Should See Me in a Crown"; "Lovely"; "Ocean Eyes"; "My Boy"; "Hostage"; "Copycat"	
November 11, 2018	Camp Flog Gnaw Carnival	Los Angeles	United States	"My Boy"; "Idontwannabeyouanymore"; "Lovely"; "Bitches Broken Hearts"; "Six Feet Under"; "Bored"; "Watch" / "&Burn"; "When the Party's Over"; "You Should See Me in a Crown"; "Bellyache"; "Ocean Eyes"; "Copycat"	
April 13, 2019	Coachella	Indio	United States	"Bad Guy (Live debut); "My Strange Addiction" (Live debut); "You Should See Me in a Crown"; "Idontwannabeyouanymore"; "Watch"; "&Burn" (with Vince Staples); "Wish You Were Gay"; "All the Good Girls Go to Hell" (Live debut); "Ilomilo" (Live debut); "Bury a Friend"; "Bellyache"; "When the Party's Over"; "Ocean Eyes"; "Copycat"	
April 20, 2019	Coachella	Indio	United States	"Bad Guy (Live debut); "My Strange Addiction" (Live debut); "You Should See Me in a Crown"; "Idontwannabeyouanymore"; "&Burn" (with Vince Staples); "Copycat"; "When I Was Older"; "Wish You Were Gay"; "Xanny"; "All the Good Girls Go to Hell"; "Ilomilo"; "Bellyache"; "When the Party's Over"; "Ocean Eyes"; "Bury a Friend"	
April 26, 2019	Groovin' the Moo	Adelaide	Australia	"Bad Guy"; "My Strange Addiction"; "You Should See Me in a Crown"; "Idontwannabeyouanymore"; "Copycat"; "Wish You Were Gay"; "All the Good Girls Go to Hell"; "Ilomilo"; "Bellyache"; "Ocean Eyes"; "When the Party's Over"; "Bury a Friend"	
April 27, 2019	Groovin' the Moo	Maitland	Australia	"Bad Guy"; "My Strange Addiction"; "You Should See Me in a Crown"; "Idontwannabeyouanymore"; "Copycat"; "Wish You Were Gay"; "All the Good Girls Go to Hell"; "Ilomilo"; "Bellyache"; "Ocean Eyes"; "When the Party's Over"; "Bury a Friend"	
April 28, 2019	Groovin' the Moo	Canberra	Australia	"Bad Guy"; "My Strange Addiction"; "You Should See Me in a Crown"; "Idontwannabeyouanymore"; "Copycat"; "Wish You Were Gay"; "All the Good Girls Go to Hell"; "Ilomilo"; "Bellyache"; "Ocean Eyes"; "When the Party's Over"; "Bury a Friend"	
May 4, 2019	Groovin' the Moo	Bendigo	Australia	"Bad Guy"; "My Strange Addiction"; "You Should See Me in a Crown"; "Idontwannabeyouanymore"; "Copycat"; "Wish You Were Gay"; "All the Good Girls Go to Hell"; "Ilomilo"; "Bellyache"; "Ocean Eyes"; "When the Party's Over"; "Bury a Friend"	
May 5, 2019	Groovin' the Moo	Townsville	Australia	"Bad Guy"; "My Strange Addiction"; "You Should See Me in a Crown"; "Idontwannabeyouanymore"; "Copycat"; "Wish You Were Gay"; "All the Good Girls Go to Hell"; "Ilomilo"; "Bellyache"; "Ocean Eyes"; "When the Party's Over"; "Bury a Friend"	
May 11, 2019	Groovin' the Moo	Bunbury	Australia	"Bad Guy"; "My Strange Addiction"; "You Should See Me in a Crown"; "Idontwannabeyouanymore"; "Copycat"; "Wish You Were Gay"; "All the Good Girls Go to Hell"; "Ilomilo"; "Bellyache"; "Ocean Eyes"; "When the Party's Over"; "Bury a Friend"	
May 25, 2019	BBC Radio 1's Big Weekend	Middlesbrough	England	"Bad Guy"; "My Strange Addiction"; "You Should See Me in a Crown"; "Idontwannabeyouanymore"; "All the Good Girls Go to Hell"; "Ilomilo"; "Bellyache"; "Ocean Eyes"; "When the Party's Over"; "Bury a Friend"	
June 27, 2019	Tinderbox	Odense	Denmark	"Bad Guy"; "My Strange Addiction"; "You Should See Me in a Crown"; "Idontwannabeyouanymore"; "Watch" / "&Burn"; "Copycat"; "When I Was Older"; "Wish You Were Gay"; "Xanny"; "All the Good Girls Go to Hell"; "Ilomilo"; "Bellyache"; "Bitches Broken Hearts"; "Listen Before I Go"; "I Love You"; "Ocean Eyes"; "When the Party's Over"; "Bury a Friend"	
June 28, 2019	Lollapalooza Stockholm	Stockholm	Sweden	"Bad Guy"; "My Strange Addiction"; "You Should See Me in a Crown"; "Idontwannabeyouanymore"; "Copycat"; "When I Was Older"; "Wish You Were Gay"; "Xanny"; "All the Good Girls Go to Hell"; "Ilomilo"; "Bellyache"; "Ocean Eyes"; "When the Party's Over"; "Bury a Friend"	
June 30, 2019	Glastonbury Festival	Pilton	England	"Bad Guy"; "My Strange Addiction"; "You Should See Me in a Crown"; "Idontwannabeyouanymore"; "Copycat"; "When I Was Older"; "Wish You Were Gay"; "Xanny"; "All the Good Girls Go to Hell"; "Ilomilo"; "Bellyache"; "Ocean Eyes"; "When the Party's Over"; "Bury a Friend"	
July 6, 2019	Summerfest	Milwaukee	United States	"Bad Guy"; "My Strange Addiction"; "You Should See Me in a Crown"; "Idontwannabeyouanymore"; "Watch" / "&Burn"; "Copycat"; "When I Was Older"; "Wish You Were Gay"; "Xanny"; "All the Good Girls Go to Hell"; "Ilomilo"; "Bellyache"; "Bitches Broken Hearts"; "Listen Before I Go"; "I Love You"; "Ocean Eyes"; "When the Party's Over"; "Bury a Friend"	
August 15, 2019	FM4 Frequency Festival	Sankt Pölten	Austria	"Bad Guy"; "My Strange Addiction"; "You Should See Me in a Crown"; "Idontwannabeyouanymore"; "Copycat"; "When I Was Older"; "Wish You Were Gay"; "Xanny"; "All the Good Girls Go to Hell"; "Ilomilo"; "Bellyache"; "Ocean Eyes"; "When the Party's Over"; "Bury a Friend"	
August 16, 2019	MS Dockville	Hamburg	Germany	"Bad Guy"; "You Should See Me in a Crown"; "Idontwannabeyouanymore"; "&Burn"; "Copycat"; "When I Was Older"; "Wish You Were Gay"; "Xanny"; "All the Good Girls Go to Hell"; "Ilomilo"; "Bellyache"; "Bitches Broken Hearts"; "When the Party's Over"; "My Strange Addiction"; "Bury a Friend"	
August 17, 2019	Lowlands	Biddinghuizen	Netherlands	"Bad Guy"; "My Strange Addiction"; "You Should See Me in a Crown"; "Idontwannabeyouanymore"; "Copycat"; "When I Was Older"; "Wish You Were Gay"; "Xanny"; "All the Good Girls Go to Hell"; "Ilomilo"; "Bellyache"; "Ocean Eyes"; "When the Party's Over"; "Bury a Friend"	
August 18, 2019	Pukkelpop	Hasselt	Belgium	"Bad Guy"; "My Strange Addiction"; "Idontwannabeyouanymore"; "All the Good Girls Go to Hell"; "When I Was Older"; "Wish You Were Gay"; "Copycat"; "Ilomilo"; "Bellyache"; "Ocean Eyes"; "You Should See Me in a Crown"; "When the Party's Over"; "Bury a Friend"	
August 22, 2019	Zürich OpenAir	Zürich	Switzerland	"Bad Guy"; "My Strange Addiction"; "You Should See Me in a Crown"; "Idontwannabeyouanymore"; "Copycat"; "When I Was Older"; "Wish You Were Gay"; "Xanny"; "All the Good Girls Go to Hell"; "Ilomilo"; "Bellyache"; "Bitches Broken Hearts"; "Ocean Eyes"; "When the Party's Over"; "Bury a Friend"	
August 24, 2019	Reading and Leeds Festivals	Reading	England	"Bad Guy"; "My Strange Addiction"; "You Should See Me in a Crown"; "Idontwannabeyouanymore"; "Copycat"; "Wish You Were Gay"; "Xanny"; "All the Good Girls Go to Hell"; "Ilomilo"; "Bellyache"; "Ocean Eyes"; "When the Party's Over"; "Bury a Friend"	
August 25, 2019	Reading and Leeds Festivals	Leeds	England	"Bad Guy"; "My Strange Addiction"; "You Should See Me in a Crown"; "Idontwannabeyouanymore"; "Copycat"; "All the Good Girls Go to Hell"; "Bellyache"; "Ocean Eyes"; "When the Party's Over"; "Bury a Friend"	
August 30, 2019	Electric Picnic	Stradbally	Ireland	"Bad Guy"; "My Strange Addiction"; "You Should See Me in a Crown"; "Idontwannabeyouanymore"; "Copycat"; "When I Was Older"; "Wish You Were Gay"; "Xanny"; "All the Good Girls Go to Hell"; "Ilomilo"; "Bellyache"; "Ocean Eyes"; "When the Party's Over"; "Bury a Friend"	
August 31, 2019	Milano Rocks	Milan	Italy	"Bad Guy"; "My Strange Addiction"; "You Should See Me in a Crown"; "Idontwannabeyouanymore"; "Copycat"; "Wish You Were Gay"; "Xanny"; "All the Good Girls Go to Hell"; "Ilomilo"; "Bellyache"; "Ocean Eyes"; "When the Party's Over"; "Bury a Friend"	
September 7, 2019	Lollapalooza Berlin	Berlin	Germany	"Bad Guy"; "My Strange Addiction"; "You Should See Me in a Crown"; "Idontwannabeyouanymore"; "Copycat"; "Wish You Were Gay"; "Xanny"; "All the Good Girls Go to Hell"; "Ilomilo"; "Bellyache"; "Ocean Eyes"; "When the Party's Over"; "Bury a Friend"	
September 15, 2019	Music Midtown	Atlanta	United States	"Bad Guy"; "My Strange Addiction"; "You Should See Me in a Crown"; "Idontwannabeyouanymore"; "Copycat"; "When I Was Older"; "Wish You Were Gay"; "Xanny"; "All the Good Girls Go to Hell"; "Ilomilo"; "Bellyache"; "Ocean Eyes"; "When the Party's Over"; "Bury a Friend"; "Bad Guy" (Encore)	
September 20, 2019	Life Is Beautiful Music & Art Festival	Las Vegas	United States	"Bad Guy"; "My Strange Addiction"; "You Should See Me in a Crown"; "Idontwannabeyouanymore"; "Watch" / "&Burn"; "Copycat"; "When I Was Older"; "Wish You Were Gay"; "Xanny"; "All the Good Girls Go to Hell"; "Ilomilo"; "Bellyache"; "Bitches Broken Hearts"; "Listen Before I Go"; "I Love You"; "Ocean Eyes"; "When the Party's Over"; "Bury a Friend"	
September 21, 2019	iHeartRadio Music Festival	Winchester	United States	"Bad Guy"; "You Should See Me in a Crown"; "All the Good Girls Go to Hell"; "Copycat"; "Ocean Eyes"; "When the Party's Over"; "Bury a Friend"	
October 5, 2019	Austin City Limits Music Festival	Austin	United States	"Bad Guy"; "My Strange Addiction"; "You Should See Me in a Crown"; "Idontwannabeyouanymore"; "Copycat"; "When I Was Older"; "Wish You Were Gay"; "Xanny"; "All the Good Girls Go to Hell"; "Ilomilo"; "Bellyache"; "Ocean Eyes"; "When the Party's Over"; "Bury a Friend"	
October 12, 2019	Austin City Limits Music Festival	Austin	United States	"Bad Guy"; "My Strange Addiction"; "You Should See Me in a Crown"; "Idontwannabeyouanymore"; "Copycat"; "When I Was Older"; "Wish You Were Gay"; "Xanny"; "All the Good Girls Go to Hell"; "Ilomilo"; "Bellyache"; "Ocean Eyes"; "When the Party's Over"; "Bury a Friend"	
November 17, 2019	Corona Capital	Mexico City	Mexico	"Bad Guy"; "My Strange Addiction"; "You Should See Me in a Crown"; "Idontwannabeyouanymore"; "Copycat"; "When I Was Older"; "Xanny"; "All the Good Girls Go to Hell"; "Ilomilo"; "Bellyache"; "Everything I Wanted (Live debut); "Ocean Eyes"; "When the Party's Over"; "Bury a Friend"	
December 6, 2019	Jingle Ball Tour 2019	Los Angeles	United States	"Bad Guy"; "You Should See Me in a Crown"; "All the Good Girls Go to Hell"; "When the Party's Over"; "Bury a Friend"	
January 18, 2020	iHeartRadio ALTer EGO	Los Angeles	United States	"Bad Guy"; "My Strange Addiction"; "You Should See Me in a Crown"; "Idontwannabeyouanymore"; "Xanny"; "All the Good Girls Go to Hell"; "Everything I Wanted"; "Bellyache"; "Ocean Eyes"; "When the Party's Over"; "Bury a Friend"	
December 10, 2020	Jingle Ball 2020 (virtual show)	Los Angeles	United States	"My Future"; "Therefore I Am"; "Silver Bells" (Dean Martin cover)	
January 28, 2021	iHeartRadio ALTer EGO (Virtual Show)	Los Angeles	United States	"Therefore I Am"; "Everything I Wanted"; "My Future"	
September 18, 2021	iHeartRadio Music Festival	Las Vegas	United States	"Bury a Friend"; "Bad Guy"; "Oxytocin"; "Everything I Wanted"; "Happier Than Ever"	
September 19, 2021	Life Is Beautiful Music & Art Festival	Las Vegas	United States	"Bury a Friend"; "You Should See Me in a Crown"; "I Didn't Change My Number"; "NDA"; "Therefore I Am"; "My Strange Addiction"; "Halley's Comet"; "Billie Bossa Nova"; "Oxytocin"; "Ilomilo"; "When the Party's Over"; "No Time to Die"; "Lost Cause"; "Everything I Wanted"; "OverHeated"; "Bellyache"; "Ocean Eyes"; "All the Good Girls Go to Hell"; "My Future"; "Your Power"; "Bad Guy"; "Happier Than Ever"; "Goodbye"	
September 23, 2021	Firefly Music Festival	Dover	United States	"Bury a Friend"; "You Should See Me in a Crown"; "I Didn't Change My Number"; "NDA"; "Therefore I Am"; "My Strange Addiction"; "Halley's Comet"; "Billie Bossa Nova"; "Oxytocin"; "Ilomilo"; "When the Party's Over"; "Lost Cause"; "Everything I Wanted"; "OverHeated"; "Bellyache"; "Ocean Eyes"; "Bored"; "All the Good Girls Go to Hell"; "My Future"; "Bad Guy"; "Happier Than Ever"; "Goodbye"	
September 24, 2021	Governors Ball	New York City	United States	"Bury a Friend"; "You Should See Me in a Crown"; "I Didn't Change My Number"; "NDA"; "Therefore I Am"; "My Strange Addiction"; "Halley's Comet"; "Billie Bossa Nova"; "Oxytocin"; "Ilomilo"; "When the Party's Over"; "Lost Cause"; "Everything I Wanted"; "OverHeated"; "Bellyache"; "Ocean Eyes"; "Bored"; "All the Good Girls Go to Hell"; "My Future"; "Bad Guy"; "Happier Than Ever"; "Goodbye"	
September 25, 2021	Global Citizen Live	New York City	United States	"Bad Guy"; "My Future"; "Oxytocin"; "Your Power"; "All the Good Girls Go to Hell"; "Happier Than Ever"	
October 2, 2021	Austin City Limits Festival	Austin	United States	"Bury a Friend"; "You Should See Me in a Crown"; "I Didn't Change My Number"; "NDA"; "Therefore I Am"; "My Strange Addiction"; "Halley's Comet"; "Billie Bossa Nova"; "Oxytocin"; "Ilomilo"; "When the Party's Over"; "Your Power"; "Lost Cause"; "OverHeated"; "Bellyache"; "Ocean Eyes"; "Bored"; "Everything I Wanted"; "All the Good Girls Go to Hell"; "My Future"; "Bad Guy"; "Happier Than Ever"; "Goodbye"	
October 9, 2021	Austin City Limits Festival	Austin	United States	"Bury a Friend"; "You Should See Me in a Crown"; "I Didn't Change My Number"; "NDA"; "Therefore I Am"; "My Strange Addiction"; "Halley's Comet"; "Billie Bossa Nova"; "Oxytocin"; "Ilomilo"; "When the Party's Over"; "Your Power"; "Lost Cause"; "OverHeated"; "Bellyache"; "Ocean Eyes"; "Bored"; "Everything I Wanted"; "All the Good Girls Go to Hell"; "My Future"; "Bad Guy"; "Happier Than Ever"; "Goodbye"	
April 16, 2022	Coachella	Indio	United States	"Bury a Friend"; "I Didn't Change My Number"; "NDA"; "Therefore I Am"; "My Strange Addiction"; "Idontwannabeyouanymore"; "Lovely" (with Khalid); "You Should See Me in a Crown"; "Billie Bossa Nova"; "Goldwing"; "Halley's Comet"; "Oxytocin" / "Copycat"; "Ilomilo"; "I Love You"; "Your Power"; "Not My Responsibility"; "OverHeated"; "Bellyache"; "Ocean Eyes"; "Getting Older" (with Damon Albarn); "Feel Good Inc" (with Gorillaz); "When the Party's Over"; "All the Good Girls Go to Hell"; "Everything I Wanted"; "Bad Guy"; "Happier Than Ever"; "Goodbye"	
April 23, 2022	Coachella	Indio	United States	"Bury a Friend"; "I Didn't Change My Number"; "NDA"; "Therefore I Am"; "My Strange Addiction"; "Idontwannabeyouanymore"; "Lovely"; "You Should See Me in a Crown"; "Billie Bossa Nova"; "Goldwing"; "Oxytocin" / "Copycat"; "Ilomilo"; "I Love You"; "Your Power"; "Misery Business" (with Hayley Williams); "Not My Responsibility"; "OverHeated"; "Bellyache"; "Ocean Eyes"; "Getting Older"; "Lost Cause"; "When the Party's Over"; "All the Good Girls Go to Hell"; "Everything I Wanted"; "Bad Guy"; "Happier Than Ever" (with Hayley Williams); "Goodbye"	
June 24, 2022	Glastonbury Festival	Pilton	England	"Bury a Friend"; "I Didn't Change My Number"; "NDA"; "Therefore I Am"; "My Strange Addiction"; "Idontwannabeyouanymore"; "Lovely"; "You Should See Me in a Crown"; "Billie Bossa Nova"; "Goldwing"; "Oxytocin" / "Copycat"; "Ilomilo"; "Your Power"; "Bellyache"; "Ocean Eyes"; "Getting Older"; "Lost Cause"; "When the Party's Over"; "All the Good Girls Go to Hell"; "Everything I Wanted"; "Bad Guy"; "Happier Than Ever"; "Goodbye"	
March 17, 2023	Lollapalooza Chile	Santiago	Chile	"Bury a Friend"; "I Didn't Change My Number"; "NDA"; "Therefore I Am"; "My Strange Addiction"; "Idontwannabeyouanymore"; "Lovely"; "You Should See Me in a Crown"; "Billie Bossa Nova"; "Goldwing"; "Xanny"; "Oxytocin" / "Copycat"; "Ilomilo"; "I Love You"; "Your Power"; "TV"; "Bellyache"; "Ocean Eyes"; "Bored"; "Getting Older"; "Lost Cause"; "When the Party's Over"; "All the Good Girls Go to Hell"; "Everything I Wanted"; "Bad Guy"; "Happier Than Ever"; "Goodbye"	
March 19, 2023	Lollapalooza Argentina	San Isidro	Argentina	"Bury a Friend"; "I Didn't Change My Number"; "NDA"; "Therefore I Am"; "My Strange Addiction"; "Idontwannabeyouanymore"; "Lovely"; "My Future"; "You Should See Me in a Crown"; "Billie Bossa Nova"; "Goldwing"; "Xanny"; "Oxytocin" / "Copycat"; "Ilomilo"; "I Love You"; "Your Power"; "TV"; "Bellyache"; "Ocean Eyes"; "Bored"; "Getting Older"; "Lost Cause"; "When the Party's Over"; "All the Good Girls Go to Hell"; "Everything I Wanted"; "Bad Guy"; "Happier Than Ever"; "Goodbye"	
March 22, 2023	Asunciónico	Luque	Paraguay	"Bury a Friend"; "I Didn't Change My Number"; "NDA"; "Therefore I Am"; "My Strange Addiction"; "Idontwannabeyouanymore"; "Lovely"; "My Future"; "You Should See Me in a Crown"; "Billie Bossa Nova"; "Goldwing"; "Xanny"; "Oxytocin" / "Copycat"; "Ilomilo"; "I Love You"; "Your Power"; "TV"; "Bellyache"; "Ocean Eyes"; "Bored"; "Getting Older"; "Lost Cause"; "When the Party's Over"; "All the Good Girls Go to Hell"; "Everything I Wanted"; "Bad Guy"; "Happier Than Ever"; "Goodbye"	
March 24, 2023	Lollapalooza Brazil	São Paulo	Brazil	"Bury a Friend"; "I Didn't Change My Number"; "NDA"; "Therefore I Am"; "My Strange Addiction"; "Idontwannabeyouanymore"; "Lovely"; "My Future"; "You Should See Me in a Crown"; "Billie Bossa Nova"; "Goldwing"; "Xanny"; "Oxytocin" / "Copycat"; "Ilomilo"; "Wish You Were Gay"; "I Love You"; "Your Power"; "TV"; "Bellyache"; "Ocean Eyes"; "Bored"; "Getting Older"; "Lost Cause"; "When the Party's Over"; "All the Good Girls Go to Hell"; "Everything I Wanted"; "Bad Guy"; "Happier Than Ever"; "Goodbye"	
March 26, 2023	Festival Estéreo Picnic	Bogotá	Colombia	"Bury a Friend"; "I Didn't Change My Number"; "NDA"; "Therefore I Am"; "My Strange Addiction"; "Idontwannabeyouanymore"; "Lovely"; "My Future"; "You Should See Me in a Crown"; "Billie Bossa Nova"; "Goldwing"; "Xanny"; "Oxytocin" / "Copycat"; "Ilomilo"; "I Love You"; "Your Power"; "TV"; "Bellyache"; "Ocean Eyes"; "Bored"; "Getting Older"; "Lost Cause"; "When the Party's Over"; "All the Good Girls Go to Hell"; "Everything I Wanted"; "Bad Guy"; "Happier Than Ever"; "Goodbye"	
March 31, 2023	Pal Norte	Monterrey	Mexico	"Bury a Friend"; "I Didn't Change My Number"; "NDA"; "Therefore I Am"; "My Strange Addiction"; "Idontwannabeyouanymore"; "Lovely"; "My Future"; "You Should See Me in a Crown"; "Goldwing"; "Xanny"; "Oxytocin" / "Copycat"; "Ilomilo"; "I Love You"; "Your Power"; "TV"; "Bellyache"; "Ocean Eyes"; "Bored"; "Getting Older"; "Lost Cause"; "When the Party's Over"; "All the Good Girls Go to Hell"; "Everything I Wanted"; "Bad Guy"; "Happier Than Ever"; "Goodbye"	
August 3, 2023	Lollapallooza	Chicago	United States	"Bury a Friend"; "I Didn't Change My Number"; "NDA"; "Therefore I Am"; "My Strange Addiction"; "Idontwannabeyouanymore"; "Lovely"; "You Should See Me in a Crown"; "Goldwing"; "What Was I Made For?" (Live debut); "Oxytocin" / "Copycat"; "Ilomilo"; "I Love You"; "Your Power"; "TV"; "Bellyache"; "Ocean Eyes"; "Lost Cause"; "Never Felt So Alone"; "When the Party's Over"; "All the Good Girls Go to Hell"; "Everything I Wanted"; "Bad Guy"; "Happier Than Ever"; "Goodbye"	
August 5, 2023	Osheaga Festival	Montreal	Canada	"Bury a Friend"; "I Didn't Change My Number"; "NDA"; "Therefore I Am"; "My Strange Addiction"; "Idontwannabeyouanymore"; "Lovely"; "My Future"; "You Should See Me in a Crown"; "Billie Bossa Nova"; "Goldwing"; "What Was I Made For?"; "Oxytocin" / "Copycat"; "Ilomilo"; "I Love You"; "Your Power"; "TV"; "Bellyache"; "Ocean Eyes"; "Billie Eilish" (with Armani White); "Lost Cause"; "Never Felt So Alone"; "When the Party's Over"; "All the Good Girls Go to Hell"; "Everything I Wanted"; "Bad Guy"; "Happier Than Ever"; "Goodbye"	
August 15, 2023	Sziget Festival	Budapest	Hungary	"Bury a Friend"; "I Didn't Change My Number"; "NDA"; "Therefore I Am"; "My Strange Addiction"; "Idontwannabeyouanymore"; "Lovely"; "My Future"; "You Should See Me in a Crown"; "Billie Bossa Nova"; "Goldwing"; "What Was I Made For?"; "Oxytocin" / "Copycat"; "Ilomilo"; "I Love You"; "Your Power"; "TV"; "Bellyache"; "Ocean Eyes"; "Getting Older"; "Lost Cause"; "Never Felt So Alone"; "When the Party's Over"; "All the Good Girls Go to Hell"; "Everything I Wanted"; "Bad Guy"; "Happier Than Ever"; "Goodbye"	
August 18, 2023	Pukkelpop	Hasselt	Belgium	"Bury a Friend"; "I Didn't Change My Number"; "NDA"; "Therefore I Am"; "My Strange Addiction"; "Idontwannabeyouanymore"; "Lovely"; "My Future"; "You Should See Me in a Crown"; "Billie Bossa Nova"; "Goldwing"; "What Was I Made For?"; "Oxytocin" / "Copycat"; "Ilomilo"; "I Love You"; "Your Power"; "TV"; "Bellyache"; "Ocean Eyes"; "Getting Older"; "Lost Cause"; "When the Party's Over"; "All the Good Girls Go to Hell"; "Everything I Wanted"; "Bad Guy"; "Happier Than Ever"; "Goodbye"	
August 20, 2023	Lowlands	Biddinghuizen	Netherlands	"Bury a Friend"; "I Didn't Change My Number"; "NDA"; "Therefore I Am"; "My Strange Addiction"; "Idontwannabeyouanymore"; "Lovely"; "My Future"; "You Should See Me in a Crown"; "Goldwing"; "What Was I Made For?"; "Oxytocin" / "Copycat"; "Ilomilo"; "I Love You"; "Your Power"; "TV"; "Bellyache"; "Ocean Eyes"; "Lost Cause"; "When the Party's Over"; "All the Good Girls Go to Hell"; "Everything I Wanted"; "Bad Guy"; "Happier Than Ever"; "Goodbye"	
August 23, 2023	Rock en Seine	Paris	France	"Bury a Friend"; "I Didn't Change My Number"; "NDA"; "Therefore I Am"; "My Strange Addiction"; "Idontwannabeyouanymore"; "Lovely"; "My Future"; "You Should See Me in a Crown"; "Goldwing"; "What Was I Made For?"; "Oxytocin" / "Copycat"; "Ilomilo"; "I Love You"; "Your Power"; "TV"; "Bellyache"; "Ocean Eyes"; "Lost Cause"; "When the Party's Over"; "All the Good Girls Go to Hell"; "Everything I Wanted"; "Bad Guy"; "Happier Than Ever"; "Goodbye"	
August 25, 2023	Reading and Leeds Festivals	Leeds	England	"Bury a Friend"; "I Didn't Change My Number"; "NDA"; "Therefore I Am"; "My Strange Addiction"; "Idontwannabeyouanymore"; "Lovely"; "My Future"; "You Should See Me in a Crown"; "Goldwing"; "What Was I Made For?"; "Oxytocin" / "Copycat"; "Ilomilo"; "I Love You"; "Your Power"; "TV"; "Bellyache"; "Ocean Eyes"; "Lost Cause"; "When the Party's Over"; "All the Good Girls Go to Hell"; "Everything I Wanted"; "Bad Guy"; "Happier Than Ever"; "Goodbye"	
August 27, 2023	Reading and Leeds Festivals	Reading	England	"Bury a Friend"; "I Didn't Change My Number"; "NDA"; "Therefore I Am"; "My Strange Addiction"; "Idontwannabeyouanymore"; "Lovely"; "You Should See Me in a Crown"; "Goldwing"; "What Was I Made For?"; "Oxytocin" / "Copycat"; "Ilomilo"; "I Love You"; "Your Power"; "TV"; "Bellyache"; "Ocean Eyes"; "Lost Cause"; "When the Party's Over"; "All the Good Girls Go to Hell"; "Everything I Wanted"; "Bad Guy"; "Happier Than Ever"; "Goodbye"	
September 1, 2023	Electric Picnic	Stradbally	Ireland	"Bury a Friend"; "I Didn't Change My Number"; "NDA"; "Therefore I Am"; "My Strange Addiction"; "Idontwannabeyouanymore"; "Lovely"; "My Future"; "You Should See Me in a Crown"; "Goldwing"; "What Was I Made For?"; "Oxytocin" / "Copycat"; "Ilomilo"; "I Love You"; "Your Power"; "TV"; "Bellyache"; "Ocean Eyes"; "When the Party's Over"; "All the Good Girls Go to Hell"; "Everything I Wanted"; "Bad Guy"; "Happier Than Ever"; "Goodbye"	
September 16, 2023	Music Midtown	Atlanta	United States	"Bury a Friend"; "I Didn't Change My Number"; "NDA"; "Therefore I Am"; "My Strange Addiction"; "Idontwannabeyouanymore"; "Lovely"; "My Future"; "You Should See Me in a Crown"; "Billie Bossa Nova"; "Goldwing"; "What Was I Made For?"; "Oxytocin" / "Copycat"; "Ilomilo"; "I Love You"; "Your Power"; "TV"; "Bellyache"; "Ocean Eyes"; "Getting Older"; "Lost Cause"; "When the Party's Over"; "All the Good Girls Go to Hell"; "Everything I Wanted"; "Bad Guy"; "Happier Than Ever"; "Goodbye"	
June, 2027	Glastonbury Festival	Pilton	England		
June 30, 2027	Roskilde Festival	Roskilde	Denmark		
July 3, 2027	BST Hyde Park	London	England		

== Award shows ==
Date	Program	City	Country	Performed song(s)	Ref.
February 16, 2019	Swiss Music Awards 2019	Lucerne	Switzerland	"When the Party's Over"	
May 16, 2019	ASCAP Pop Music Awards 2019	Los Angeles	United States	"When the Party's Over"	
November 24, 2019	American Music Awards of 2019	Los Angeles	United States	"All the Good Girls Go to Hell"	
January 26, 2020	62nd Annual Grammy Awards	Los Angeles	United States	"When the Party's Over"	
February 9, 2020	92nd Academy Awards	Los Angeles	United States	"Yesterday" (The Beatles cover)	
February 18, 2020	Brit Awards 2020	London	England	"No Time to Die"	
November 22, 2020	American Music Awards of 2020	Los Angeles	United States	"Therefore I Am"	
November 25, 2020	2020 ARIA Music Awards	Sydney (Note: Billie's performance was pre-recorded in Los Angeles and broadcast at the award show.)	Australia	"Therefore I Am"	
March 14, 2021	63rd Annual Grammy Awards	Los Angeles	United States	"Everything I Wanted"	
March 27, 2022	94th Academy Awards	Los Angeles	United States	"No Time to Die"	
April 3, 2022	64th Annual Grammy Awards	Las Vegas	United States	"Happier Than Ever"	
February 4, 2024	66th Annual Grammy Awards	Los Angeles	United States	"What Was I Made For?"	
March 10, 2024	96th Academy Awards	Los Angeles	United States	"What Was I Made For?"	
November 1, 2024	NRJ Music Awards 2024	Cannes	France	"Birds of a Feather" (Note: The performance was recorded from one of the Hit Me Hard And Soft: The Tour shows.)	
February 2, 2025	67th Annual Grammy Awards	Los Angeles	United States	"Birds of a Feather"	
March 17, 2025	2025 iHeartRadio Music Awards	Los Angeles	United States	"Wildflower"	

== TV shows and specials ==
Date	Program	City	Country	Performed song(s)	Ref.
February 11, 2017	Lexus Amazing Performances	Los Angeles	United States	"Ocean Eyes"	
September 20, 2017	The Late Late Show with James Corden	Los Angeles	United States	"Ocean Eyes"	
October 18, 2017	MTV TRL	New York City	United States	"Ocean Eyes"	
March 1, 2018	The Box Plus Network's Fresh Focus Artist of the Month	London	England	"Bellyache"	
March 22, 2018	The Tonight Show Starring Jimmy Fallon	New York City	United States	"Bellyache"; "Call Me Back" (The Strokes cover)	
October 10, 2018	The Ellen DeGeneres Show	Los Angeles	United States	"You Should See Me in a Crown"	
February 19, 2019	Quotidien	Paris	France	"When the Party's Over"	
March 28, 2019	Jimmy Kimmel Live!	Los Angeles	United States	"Bury a Friend"; "Bad Guy"	
April 1, 2019	The Ellen DeGeneres Show	Los Angeles	United States	"When the Party's Over"	
September 28, 2019	Saturday Night Live	New York City	United States	"Bad Guy"; "I Love You"	
December 9, 2019	The Late Late Show with James Corden	Los Angeles	United States	"Ocean Eyes" (with Alicia Keys)	
March 30, 2020	Homefest: James Corden's Late Late Show Special	Los Angeles	United States	"Everything I Wanted"	
October 5, 2020	The Tonight Show Starring Jimmy Fallon	Los Angeles	United States	"No Time to Die"	
December 25, 2020	Music Station ULTRA SUPER LIVE	—N/a	Japan	"Bad Guy"	
May 10, 2021	The Late Show with Stephen Colbert	New York	United States	"Your Power"	
August 9, 2021	The Tonight Show Starring Jimmy Fallon	New York	United States	"Happier Than Ever"	
October 13, 2021	Jimmy Kimmel Live!	Los Angeles	United States	"Happier Than Ever"	
December 11, 2021	Saturday Night Live	New York City	United States	"Happier Than Ever"; "Male Fantasy"	
December 16, 2023	Saturday Night Live	New York City	United States	"What Was I Made For?"; "Have Yourself a Merry Little Christmas"	
May 21, 2024	The Late Show with Stephen Colbert	New York City	United States	"Lunch"	
June 10, 2024	The Late Show with Stephen Colbert	New York City	United States	"The Greatest"	
October 19, 2024	Saturday Night Live	New York City	United States	"Birds of a Feather"; "Wildflower"	

== Radio shows and specials ==
Date	Program	City	Country	Performed song(s)	Ref.
January 31, 2017	We Found New Music with Grant Owens	Los Angeles	United States	"Ocean Eyes"	
August 11, 2017	Heard Well Radio	Los Angeles	United States	"Ocean Eyes"; "Copycat"	
February 8, 2018	Like a Version	Sydney	Australia	"Bellyache"; "Bad" (Michael Jackson cover)	
October 29, 2018	Q101 - The Lounge	Chicago	United States	"Ocean Eyes "; "When the Party's Over"; "Bellyache"	
November 20, 2018	SiriusXM	New York City	United States	"You Should See Me in a Crown"; "When the Party's Over"; "Telegraph Ave." (Childish Gambino cover)	
February 13, 2019	DR P3	Copenhagen	Denmark	"When the Party's Over"; "Bury a Friend"	
February 23, 2019	NPO 3FM	Utrecht	Netherlands	"Ocean Eyes"; "When the Party's Over"; "idontwannabeyouanymore"; "Bellyache"; "Bury a Friend"	
February 26, 2019	BBC Radio 1's Future Sounds with Annie Mac	London	England	"You Should See Me in a Crown"; "Idontwannabeyouanymore"; "Ocean Eyes"; "Bury a Friend"; "When The Party's Over"; "You Don't Get Me High Anymore" (Phantogram cover)	
February 19, 2019	Virgin Radio France	Paris	France	"When the Party's Over"; "Bury a Friend"	
March 6, 2019	BBC Radio 1's Future Sounds with Annie Mac	London	England	"Wish You Were Gay"	
March 31, 2019	BBC Radio 1 Piano Sessions	London	England	"When The Party's Over"; "The End Of The World" (Rob Dickinson cover)	
May 2, 2019	Nova's Red Room	Melbourne	Australia	"Bad Guy"; "Idontwannabeyouanymore"; "My Strange Addiction"; "Bury a Friend"; "All the Good Girls Go to Hell"; "When The Party's Over"	
September 29, 2019	The Howard Stern Show	New York City	United States	"All The Good Girls Go to Hell"; "When The Party's Over"	
December 3, 2020	Alt Nation	Los Angeles	United States	"Therefore I Am"; "Everything I Wanted"; "Ocean Eyes"; "Something" (The Beatles cover)	
July 29, 2021	Unserding Radio Exclusive Performance	—N/a (Note: Eilish's performance was pre-recorded and broadcast during the radio show.)	Germany	"NDA"; "Billie Bossa Nova"	
August 5, 2021	Live Lounge	London	England	"Getting Older"; "NDA"; "I Didn't Change My Number"; "I'm in the Mood for Love" (Julie London cover)	
December 13, 2021	The Howard Stern Show	New York City	United States	"Everybody Dies"; "Your Power"	
December 22, 2024	KCRW	Santa Monica	United States	"The Greatest"; "Wildflower"; "Birds of a Feather"	

== Other performances ==
Date	Event	City	Country	Venue	Performed song(s)	Ref.
June 28, 2016	Shazam	Los Angeles	United States	Shazam Los Angeles	—N/a	
August 8, 2016	Sofar Sounds	Los Angeles	United States	—N/a	"Six Feet Under"	
February 27, 2017	Nylon's exclusive performance	Los Angeles	United States	Exquisite Studio	"Ocean Eyes"; "Six Feet Under"; "Bellyache"	
August 15, 2017	A Colors Show	Berlin	Germany	Colors Studio	"Watch"	
September 20, 2017	Apple Music Up Next Session	Los Angeles	United States	—N/a	"Bellyache"; "Watch"; "Ocean Eyes"	
October 7, 2017	Apple Store Performance	San Francisco	United States	Apple Store at Union Square	"Copycat"; "Hotline Bling" (Drake cover); "Party Favor"; "Idontwannabeyouanymore"; "Ocean Eyes" (Note: Set list may be incomplete.)	
October 16, 2017	Apple Store Performance	Brooklyn	United States	Apple Store at Williamsburg	—N/a	
December 29, 2017	Brockhampton's Prom	Los Angeles	United States	El Rey Theater	—N/a	
February 5, 2018	General Pants Co. Performance	Sydney	United States	General Pants Co. at George Street	"Ocean Eyes"; "Copycat"; "Idontwannabeyouanymore"; "Watch"; "Hotline Bling" (Drake cover); "Party Favor"; "Bellyache"; "My Boy"	
May 13, 2018	ALT 105.3 BFD 2018	Concord	United States	Concord Pavilion	"Bellyache"; "Idontwannabeyouanymore"; "Watch"; "Bored"; "Hotline Bling" (Drake cover); "Party Favor"; "Ocean Eyes"; "My Boy"; "Copycat"	
October 27, 2018	Vevo LIFT Live Sessions	Brooklyn	United States	Vevo Studio	"Bellyache"; "When the Party's Over"; "You Should See Me in a Crown"	
October 27, 2017	Mahogany Sessions	Los Angeles	United States	—N/a	"Copycat"	
November 2, 2017	Mahogany Sessions	Los Angeles	United States	—N/a	"Party Favor"	
April 3, 2018	A Colors Show	Los Angeles	United States	Colors Studio	"Idontwannabeyouanymore"	
September 15, 2018	Music Midtown (Note: Eilish appeared as a surprise guest performer on the Thirty Seconds to Mars set at Music Midtown.)	Atlanta	United States	Piedmont Park	"Hurricane" (with Thirty Seconds to Mars)	
November 6, 2018	Vevo DSCVR Artists to Watch 2018	Los Angeles	United States	—N/a	"My Boy"	
November 18, 2018	Concert for Tommy's Field	Los Angeles	United States	Orpheum Theater	"Bellyache"; "Idontwannabeyouanymore"; "Copycat"; "When the Party's Over"; "Ocean Eyes"	
November 20, 2018	Apple Holiday Campaign Performance	Santa Monica	United States	Apple Store at Third Street Promenade	"Come Out and Play"	
December 9, 2018	KROQ Almost Acoustic Christmas	Inglewood	United States	Kia Forum	"Bellyache"; "Bitches Broken Hearts"; "Idontwannabeyouanymore"; "Come Out and Play"; "You Should See Me in a Crown"; "When the Party's Over"; "Ocean Eyes"	
December 10, 2018	KNRK's December to Remember	Portland	United States	Crystal Ballroom	"My Boy"; "Idontwannabeyouanymore"; "Come Out and Play"; "Bored"; "Hotline Bling" (Drake cover); "Party Favor"; "Bitches Broken Hearts"; "Six Feet Under"; "Watch"; "When the Party's Over"; "You Should See Me in a Crown"; "Hostage"; "Bellyache"; "Lovely"; "Ocean Eyes"; "Copycat"	
December 11, 2018	KNDD's Deck the Hall Ball	Seattle	United States	WaMu Theater	"Bellyache"; "Bitches Broken Hearts"; "Idontwannabeyouanymore"; "Come Out and Play"; "You Should See Me in a Crown"; "When the Party's Over"; "Ocean Eyes"; "Copycat"	
December 12, 2018	Alt 98.7 Share the Love Benefit Show	Los Angeles	United States	Wiltern Theater	"My Boy"; "Idontwannabeyouanymore"; "Come Out and Play"; "Bored"; "Hotline Bling" (Drake cover); "Party Favor"; "Bitches Broken Hearts"; "Six Feet Under"; "Watch"; "When the Party's Over"; "You Should See Me in a Crown"; "Hostage"; "Bellyache"; "Lovely"; "Ocean Eyes"; "Copycat"	
December 14, 2018	91X Wrex the Halls	San Diego	United States	Valley View Casino Center	"My Boy"; "You Should See Me in a Crown"; "Bellyache"; "Copycat" (Note: Set list may be incomplete.)	
January 5, 2019	Sean Penn CORE Gala 2019	Los Angeles	United States	Wiltern Theatre	"Ocean Eyes"; "Idontwannabeyouanymore" (Note: Set list may be incomplete.)	
April 1, 2019	MTV Push	Santa Monica	United States	MTV/VH1 Studios	"When the Party's Over"; "Xanny"; "Wish You Were Gay"	
April 5, 2019	Cleveland High School Performance	Los Angeles	United States	Cleveland High School	"Bellyache"; "Idontwannabeyouanymore"; "Ocean Eyes"; "Bury a Friend"; "When the Party's Over"	
April 14, 2019	Coachella 2019 (Note: Eilish appeared as a surprise guest performer on the second weekend of Khalid's set on Coachella.)	Indio	United States	Empire Polo Club	"Lovely" (with Khalid)	
July 20, 2019	Chanel J12 Yacht Club Event	Shelter Island	United States	Sunset Beach Hotel	"Bad Guy"; "Bellyache"; "Ocean Eyes"; "Bury a Friend"	
July 27, 2019	City of Hope 2019 Spirit of Life Gala	Las Vegas	United States	Mandalay Bay Convention Center	"Bad Guy"; "Ocean Eyes" (Note: Set list incomplete.)	
September 17, 2019	Grammy Museum	Los Angeles	United States	Clive Davis Theater	"Bellyache"; "Ocean Eyes"; "All the Good Girls Go to Hell"; "Bad Guy"; "When the Party's Over"	
September 18, 2019	SiriusXM and Pandora exclusive	West Hollywood	United States	The Troubadour	"Bad Guy"; "My Strange Addiction"; "You Should See Me in a Crown"; "Idontwannabeyouanymore"; "Copycat"; "When I Was Older"; "Wish You Were Gay"; "Xanny"; "All the Good Girls Go to Hell"; "Ilomilo"; "Bellyache"; "Bitches Broken Hearts"; "I Love You"; "Ocean Eyes"; "When the Party's Over"; "Bury a Friend"	
October 11, 2019	Austin City Limits	Austin	United States	Moody Theater	"Bad Guy"; "My Strange Addiction"; "You Should See Me in a Crown"; "Idontwannabeyouanymore"; "Copycat"; "When I Was Older"; "Wish You Were Gay"; "Xanny"; "All The Good Girls Go to Hell"; "Ilomilo"; "Bellyache"; "Ocean Eyes"; "When the Party's Over"; "Bury a Friend"; "Goodbye"	
October 19, 2019	We Can Survive 2019	Los Angeles	United States	Hollywood Bowl	"Bad Guy"; "My Strange Addiction"; "You Should See Me in a Crown"; "Idontwannabeyouanymore"; "Copycat"; "All The Good Girls Go to Hell"; "Bellyache"; "Ocean Eyes"; "When the Party's Over"; "Bury a Friend"	
October 26, 2019	UNICEF's Masquerade Ball	Los Angeles	United States	Kimpton La Peer Hotel	"Bad Guy"; "When the Party's Over"; "All The Good Girls Go to Hell"; "I Love You"	
December 4, 2019	Apple Music Awards 2019: Billie Eilish Live at the Steve Jobs Theater	Los Angeles	United States	Steve Jobs Theater	"Ocean Eyes"; "Bellyache"; "Copycat"; "8" / "Party Favor"; "Idontwannabeyouanymore"; "Wish You Were Gay"; "All The Good Girls Go to Hell"; "Xanny"; "Bad Guy"; "Ilomilo"; "Come Out and Play"; "Bury a Friend"; "Listen Before I Go"; "I Love You"; "Everything I Wanted"; "When the Party's Over"	
January 23, 2020	Spotify's Best New Artist Party	Los Angeles	United States	The Lot Studios	"Bury a Friend"; "Xanny"; "All the Good Girls Go to Hell"; "Ocean Eyes"; "I Love You"; "Bad Guy"	
January 25, 2020	Universal Music Group's Exclusive Grammy Showcase	Los Angeles	United States	Milk Studios	"All The Good Girls Go to Hell"; "Bad Guy"	
March 29, 2020	iHeartRadio Living Room Concert For America	—N/a (Note: These events were held online.)			"Bad Guy"	
April 17, 2020	Some Good News Prom	—N/a			"Bad Guy"	
April 18, 2020	One World: Together at Home	—N/a			"Sunny" (Bobby Hebb cover)	
April 22, 2020	Verizon's Pay it Forward Live	—N/a			"All The Good Girls Go to Hell"; "Ilomilo"; "Bad Guy"; "Everything I Wanted"	
August 19, 2020	2020 Democratic National Convention	—N/a			"My Future"	
August 26, 2020	Tiny Desk (Home) Concert	Los Angeles	United States	Finneas's house	"My Future"; "Everything I Wanted"	
December 23, 2020	Q101's The Virtual Night We Stole Christmas	—N/a (Note: These events were held online.)			"Therefore I Am"	
January 12, 2021	CES 2021	—N/a			"My Future"; "Therefore I Am"	
February 25, 2021	The World's a Little Blurry: Live Premiere Event	Los Angeles	United States	—N/a	"Ilomilo"	
September 20, 2021	Time 100 performance	—N/a (Note: This event was held online.)			"Billie Bossa Nova"; "Getting Older"	
September 25, 2021	Global Citizen Live (Note: Eilish appeared as a surprise guest performer on the Coldplay's set at Global Citizen Live.)	New York	United States	Great Lawn	"Fix You" (with Coldplay)	
October 6, 2021	The New Yorker Festival	—N/a (Note: This event was held online.)			"Halley's Comet"; "No Time to Die"	
October 29, 2021 and October 31, 2021	The Nightmare Before Christmas in Concert	Los Angeles	United States	Banc of California Stadium	"Sally's Song"; "Simply Meant to Be" (with Danny Elfman)	
April 8, 2022	Global Citizen's Stand Up for Ukraine	—N/a (Note: This event was held online.)			"Your Power" (Note: Performance recorded from one of the Happier Than Ever, The World Tour shows.)	
July 14, 2022	Finneas Live at the Troubadour (Note: Eilish appeared as a surprise guest at Finneas' concert at the Troubadour)	West Hollywood	United States	Troubadour	"Hostage"; "Happier Than Ever"	
July 27, 2022	Tribute to Peggy Lee and Frank Sinatra	Los Angeles	United States	Hollywood Bowl	"Fever"; "Is That All There Is?" (with Debbie Harry)	
December 2, 2022	2022 Earthshot Prize	Boston (Note: Eilish's performance was pre-recorded and broadcast during the ceremony.)	United States	MGM Music Hall	"My Future"	
April 15, 2023	Coachella 2023 (Note: Eilish appeared as a surprise guest performer on the first weekend of Labrinth's set at Coachella.)	Indio	United States	Empire Polo Club	"Never Felt So Alone" (with Labrinth)	
June 22, 2023	Power Our Planet: Live in Paris	Paris	France	Champ de Mars	"Your Power"; "Everything I Wanted"; "Happier Than Ever"	
July 19, 2023	This Is Why Tour (Note: Eilish appeared as a surprise guest at Paramore's show in Los Angeles as part of the This Is Why Tour.)	Los Angeles	United States	Kia Forum	"All I Wanted" (with Paramore)	
December 3, 2023	Academy Museum Gala 2023	Los Angeles	United States	Academy Museum of Motion Pictures	"What Was I Made For?"; "Happier Than Ever" (Note: Set list incomplete.)	
April 12, 2024	Coachella 2024 (Note: Eilish appeared as a surprise guest performer on the first weekend of Lana Del Rey's set at Coachella.)	Indio	United States	Empire Polo Club	"Ocean Eyes" and "Video Games" (with Lana Del Rey)	
May 15, 2024	YouTube Brandcast	New York City	United States	David Geffen Hall	"Ocean Eyes"; "Everything I Wanted"; "What Was I Made For?"	
July 29, 2024	Amazon Music's Songline	Los Angeles	United States	—N/a	"Skinny"; "L'Amour de Ma Vie"; "Wildflower"; "Birds of a Feather"	
August 11, 2024	2024 Summer Olympics closing ceremony	Long Beach	United States	Rosie's Dog Beach	"Birds of a Feather"; "The Greatest"	
September 18, 2024	A Colors Show	Berlin	Germany	Colors Studio	"Wildflower"	
December 12, 2024	Tiny Desk Concerts	Washington, D.C.	United States	NPR's office	"The Greatest"; "L'Amour de Ma Vie"; "I Love You"; "Birds of a Feather"	
December 17, 2024	Apple Music's Artist of the Year 2024 Live	Los Angeles	United States	—N/a	"Wildflower"; "L'Amour de Ma Vie"; "The Greatest"; "Birds of a Feather"	
January 30, 2025	FireAid	Los Angeles	United States	Kia Forum	"Last Night on Earth" (with Green Day)	
January 30, 2025	FireAid	Los Angeles	United States	Intuit Dome	"Wildflower"; "The Greatest"; "Birds of a Feather"	
April 12, 2025	Coachella 2025 (Note: Eilish appeared as a surprise guest performer on the first weekend of Charli XCX's set at Coachella.)	Indio	United States	Empire Polo Club	"Guess" (with Charli XCX)	
October 30, 2026	The Lost Tour	Los Angeles	United States	Intuit Dome	"Savior Complex" (with Phoebe Bridgers)	
