= Six Feet Under (Billie Eilish song) =

2016 single by Billie Eilish

Single by Billie Eilish
- Released: June 24, 2016
- Genre: Pop
- Length: 3:09
- Label: Drup Music; Darkroom; Interscope
- Songwriter: Finneas O'Connell
- Producer: Finneas O'Connell

Billie Eilish singles chronology
| "Ocean Eyes" (2015) | "Six Feet Under" (2016) | "Bellyache" (2017) |

Music video
- "Six Feet Under" on YouTube

"Six Feet Under" is the second single by American singer Billie Eilish. It was published to SoundCloud on June 23, 2016, and commercially released a day later by Drup Music. Finneas O'Connell, Eilish's brother, solely wrote and produced the track, which was described by critics as a pop ballad. Commercially, it received platinum certifications in Australia, Brazil, Canada, and New Zealand.

== Background and composition ==
"Six Feet Under" was originally released through Eilish's SoundCloud on June 23, 2016, and was released as a commercial single for digital download and streaming by Drup Music, a day later. The track was written and produced by Eilish's brother, Finneas O'Connell. Mastering and mixing was handled by the studio personnel, John Greenham, and Rob Kinelski, respectively.

According to sheet music published by Hal Leonard Music Publishing on Musicnotes.com, "Six Feet Under" has a moderate tempo of 68 beats per minute. The song is played in the key of B minor, while Eilish's vocals span a range of A_{3} to D_{5}. Press reviews described the song as an atmospheric pop ballad. Mike Wass of Idolator compared the instrumentation to the later work of Lana Del Rey, Låpsley and Birdy. An EP featuring remixes by Blu J, Gazzo, Jerry Folk and Aire Atlantica was released in January 2017. Dan Regan of Billboard favored Jerry Folk's remix over the others, saying it "punches you right in the face with its wall of vocal harmonies", and further says "silence weighs heavy throughout, adding weight to every note as it drips from the speaker into your brain". Lyrically, "Six Feet Under" is described as "somber" and "delicate" like "Ocean Eyes".

== Reception ==
Upon its release, "Six Feet Under" was praised by Ryan Reed of Rolling Stone, who called the track "mournful" and "atmospheric". The song has been awarded a platinum certification award from Music Canada (MC). It has also been certified gold by the Recording Industry Association of America (RIAA) and the Mexican Association of Producers of Phonograms and Videograms, A.C. (AMPROFON).

== Promotion ==
A homemade music video for this song was released on June 30, 2016. It was directed by Eilish and shows clips of smoke balls in front of a fence, played both forward and in reverse. The video was edited by her mother, Maggie Baird. "Six Feet Under" was included on the setlist of Eilish's When We All Fall Asleep Tour (2019). The song was used in American Horror Story's 9th season. In a brief promo clip posted on Instagram, director and writer Ryan Murphy, revealed a young woman running through the woods in slow-motion, being chased by a masked man holding a knife. The woman enters a cabin, crying and screaming as the blade breaks through the door.

== Track listing ==
Digital download
| No. | Title | Length |
|---|---|---|
| 1. | "Six Feet Under" | 3:09 |

Digital EP – Remixes
| No. | Title | Length |
|---|---|---|
| 1. | "Six Feet Under" (Blu J Remix) | 3:35 |
| 2. | "Six Feet Under" (Gazzo Remix) | 3:28 |
| 3. | "Six Feet Under" (Jerry Folk Remix) | 3:20 |
| 4. | "Six Feet Under" (Aire Atlantica Remix) | 3:41 |
| Total length: | | 13:24 |

== Personnel ==
Credits adapted from Tidal.

- Billie Eilish – vocals
- Finneas O'Connell – vocals, songwriter, production
- John Greenham – mastering
- Rob Kinelski – mixing

== Certifications ==
Certifications and sales for "Six Feet Under"
| Region | Certification | Certified units/sales |
|---|---|---|
| Australia (ARIA) | 2× Platinum | 140,000^{‡} |
| Austria (IFPI Austria) | Gold | 15,000^{‡} |
| Brazil (Pro-Música Brasil) | Platinum | 60,000^{‡} |
| Canada (Music Canada) | 2× Platinum | 160,000^{‡} |
| Denmark (IFPI Danmark) | Gold | 45,000^{‡} |
| France (SNEP) | Gold | 100,000^{‡} |
| Mexico (AMPROFON) | Gold | 30,000^{‡} |
| New Zealand (RMNZ) | Platinum | 30,000^{‡} |
| Poland (ZPAV) | Gold | 10,000^{‡} |
| Portugal (AFP) | Gold | 5,000^{‡} |
| United Kingdom (BPI) | Gold | 400,000^{‡} |
| United States (RIAA) | Gold | 500,000^{‡} |
^{‡} Sales+streaming figures based on certification alone.
