= Everything I Wanted =

2019 single by Billie Eilish

Single by Billie Eilish
- Written: September 2018 – September 2019 (Note: According to the songwriters, they began working on the song near the end of September 2018. For Variety, Eilish said that they wrote the first verse in fall of 2018, the chorus in April of 2019, and finished the writing in September 2019.)
- Released: November 13, 2019
- Recorded: c. October – November 2019
- Genre: Alternative pop
- Length: 4:05
- Label: Darkroom; Interscope
- Songwriters: Billie Eilish; Finneas O'Connell
- Producer: Finneas O'Connell

Billie Eilish singles chronology
"All the Good Girls Go to Hell" (2019)	"Everything I Wanted" (2019)	"No Time to Die" (2020)

Music video
- "Everything I Wanted" on YouTube

"Everything I Wanted" (stylized in all lowercase) is a song by American singer-songwriter Billie Eilish, released on November 13, 2019, by Darkroom and Interscope Records as a standalone single. It was later added to the Japanese complete and deluxe editions of Eilish's debut studio album, When We All Fall Asleep, Where Do We Go? (2019). Written by Eilish and its producer, her brother, Finneas O'Connell, it is an electronica and house-influenced alternative pop track with minimal piano and downtempo bass guitar instrumentation. Inspired by a nightmare she experienced, the song is about Eilish's strong relationship with O'Connell and his protectiveness of her from harm.

"Everything I Wanted" received acclaim from critics, several of whom praised the music and lyrics. The song reached number eight on the Billboard Hot 100, becoming Eilish's second top-ten hit in the United States. It debuted at number one in several countries, including Ireland and Norway, and reached the top five in Australia, Austria, the Netherlands, New Zealand, Sweden, Switzerland, and the United Kingdom. "Everything I Wanted" has received several certifications, including quadruple Platinum in Canada and triple Platinum in the US and the UK. At the 63rd Annual Grammy Awards, the song won Record of the Year and was nominated for Song of the Year and Best Pop Solo Performance.

Eilish directed the song's accompanying music video, which was uploaded to her YouTube channel on January 23, 2020. The video depicts Eilish and O'Connell holding hands while driving in a Dodge Challenger through a city and into the ocean; it received positive reviews from critics, many of whom praised its visual theme and message. Eilish has performed "Everything I Wanted" live several times; it was included on the set lists of her When We All Fall Asleep Tour (2019) and Where Do We Go? World Tour (2020). Eilish and O'Connell performed the track during a 50-minute livestream for Verizon Communications in April 2020, as well as at the 63rd Grammy Awards in March 2021.

== Background and release ==
In October 2019, Finneas O'Connell said he and his sister, Billie Eilish, were working on new music. In November of that year, Eilish announced the release of two new songs and a music video for the song "Xanny", which was released the following month. She later announced the song's title, "Everything I Wanted", and its release date during a livestream on Instagram on November 10, 2019. "Everything I Wanted" was used in an advertisement for Beats by Dre headphones that features Eilish. The track was originally titled "Nightmare".

Eilish and O'Connell—who is best known by his stage name, Finneas—started to write "Everything I Wanted" in September 2018; it began as a feeling of Eilish's depression. Eilish got the inspiration for the song in 2018, when she had a dream in which she died after jumping off the Golden Gate Bridge and nobody cared. She could not stop thinking about her nightmares, which made her feel "caught up" and "distracted" as she and O'Connell were trying to work her fears into a new track. When she told O'Connell about the idea, he became very uncomfortable about the topic. In an interview with The New York Times, Eilish said she "was in a really bad place mentally" while O'Connell said he did not want to help her write a hopeless song about suicide because he and their parents were concerned about her well-being. He told Eilish she "can't always solve [her] problems in a song". Eilish persuaded O'Connell and their parents by telling them that writing "Everything I Wanted" was "the way I can feel those things without doing something to myself". Eilish and O'Connell changed the song's subject to one of mutual support and togetherness rather than depression and suicide. The duo discussed how their relationship and understanding of what music is have made them write music together. The song also references Eilish's feelings about fame, which she sometimes finds frustrating.

"Everything I Wanted" was mastered by John Greenham and mixed by Rob Kinelski, both of whom also served as studio personnel. The song was released for digital download and streaming as a single on November 13, 2019, via Darkroom and Interscope Records. It was added to the reissue of Eilish's debut studio album, When We All Fall Asleep, Where Do We Go?, in December 2019. A flexi disc of the song was released via pre-order to ship in the following four-to-six weeks. The release came with a digital single that was delivered to US customers via email. The single's cover art, an abstract painting of the Golden Gate Bridge in San Francisco, California, was made by Jason Anderson.

== Composition ==
"Everything I Wanted" has a moderately fast tempo of 120 beats per minute (BPM) and is played in the key of A major while Eilish's vocal range spans from the low note of E_{3} to the high note of B_{4}. According to Jem Aswad from Variety, the song features a significant use of reverberation, a "gentle beatbox, and soft, hazy keyboard riffs". The track has been described as a house and electronica-influenced pop and alternative pop track in press reviews; it features minimalist production consisting of piano and downtempo bass guitar instrumentation. According to Lake Schatz of Consequence of Sound, the song has a "spare beat and quiet keys".

According to Eilish, the song discusses her relationship with O'Connell and his ongoing support for her. The song's first verse was inspired by Eilish's experiences with depression and mental illness. The track begins with the singer talking about her committing suicide and nobody caring: "Thought I could fly / So I stepped off the Golden / Nobody cried / Nobody even noticed / I saw them standing right there / Kinda thought they might care." In the chorus, Eilish and O'Connell talk about their mutual support for each other and the way O'Connell helps Eilish deal with fame and her personal demons: "And you say, 'As long as I'm here, no one can hurt you' / Don't wanna lie here, but you can learn to / If I could change the way that you see yourself / You wouldn't wonder why you hear, 'they don't deserve you.'" Pitchfork's Dani Blum stated that the song "has layered vocals that swell and surround Eilish in the bridge" as she repeatedly asks "If I knew it all then, would I do it again? / If they knew what they said would go straight to my head / What would they say instead?"

== Critical response ==
"Everything I Wanted" received widespread critical acclaim upon release. The song was praised by Insider's Callie Ahlgrim, who called it a "thoughtful dynamic" and the lyrics a "breathtaking portrait of their in-sync collaborative skills". Jon Caramanica from The New York Times said that the keyboards on the recording are "urgent" and "elegiac", and described the chorus as "draining yet hopeful". Rolling Stone's Brenna Ehrlich wrote that the song showed a "softer, sadder version of Eilish" and described the track as "a meditation on fame". Writing for Clash, Robin Murray said that the song "is definitely hewn from Billie's tender side". The staff of DIY labeled the track a "cool, quietly upbeat production". Billboard's Heran Mamo called the track a "touching tribute". Idolator's Mike Wass wrote that it is "eerie, yet comforting". Starr Bowenbank, writing for Cosmopolitan magazine, regarded it as a song that would "leave you sobbing in a puddle of your own tears". ABC News Radio's Randy Holmes described "Everything I Wanted" as an "emotional" and "chilling" track. Julia Emmanuele of Bustle magazine viewed the song "makes it clear that Eilish's experiences with managing her mental health is constantly evolving, but it seems that the singer is determined to surround herself with people like Finneas, who help support her through it all."

Jasmine Gomez, writing for Seventeen, called "Everything I Wanted" a "haunting, yet beautiful tribute" from Eilish to O'Connell. Rhian Daly of NME wrote that the track's "message is cohesive and clear. The duo have got each other's backs, be that protecting each other from the outside world and helping change their perceptions of themselves." Brent Furdyk, writing for Entertainment Tonight Canada, labeled the song "a touching tribute to [Eilish's and O'Connell's] kindship" In a mixed review for Los Angeles Times, August Brown called the song a "misty, echoing loop that keeps her downcast voice front and center in the mix". The staff of Electronic Beats compared the track to Eilish's number-one hit "Bad Guy", while Aswad said that it is "neither a menacing banger like ['Bad Guy'] or a ballad like 'I Love You'". Sam Prance of PopBuzz labeled the song's lyrics as "heartbreakingly personal". Allie Gemmill of Teen Vogue described "Everything I Wanted" as "moody", "slow", and "introspective", calling it another "classic Billie jam". In a review for Stereogum, Chris Deville said that the track puts a "crystalline, watery spin on her signature sound".

== Accolades ==
Awards and nominations for "Everything I Wanted"
Ceremony	Year	Award	Result	Ref.
MTV Video Music Awards	2020	Video of the Year	Nominated	
MTV Video Music Awards	2020	Song of the Year	Nominated	
MTV Millennial Awards Brazil	2020	Global Hit	Nominated	
Meus Prêmios Nick	2020	Favorite International Hit	Nominated	
MTV Europe Music Awards	2020	Best Video	Nominated	
ASCAP Pop Music Awards	2021	Award Winning Songs	Won	
Grammy Awards	2021	Record of the Year	Won	
Grammy Awards	2021	Song of the Year	Nominated	
Grammy Awards	2021	Best Pop Solo Performance	Nominated	
iHeartRadio Music Awards	2021	Alternative Rock Song of the Year	Nominated	
iHeartRadio Music Awards	2021	Best Lyrics	Nominated	

== Commercial performance ==
"Everything I Wanted" debuted at number 74 on the US Billboard Hot 100 on November 23, 2019, before rising to its peak of number eight the following week, earning Eilish her second top-ten hit on the chart. The song also achieved success on Billboard component charts; it topped the Billboard Alternative Songs radio airplay chart in February 2020, becoming Eilish's third number-one and tying her with Beck and Alanis Morissette for the most number-ones by a solo artist on the chart. "Everything I Wanted" also reached the top five on the Adult Top 40, Dance/Mix Show Airplay, Mainstream Top 40 and Hot Rock & Alternative Songs charts. It has received a triple Platinum certification by the Recording Industry Association of America (RIAA), denoting track-equivalent sales of three million units based on sales and streams.

Internationally, "Everything I Wanted" peaked at number eight on the Canadian Hot 100 and has received a quadruple Platinum certification by Music Canada (MC). In the United Kingdom, the song reached a peak of number three on the UK Singles Chart, becoming Eilish's third top-ten hit in the country. It has received a triple Platinum certification from the British Phonographic Industry (BPI), which denotes track-equivalent sales of 1,800,000 units. It peaked at number two on the Australian singles chart and has also received an eight-times Platinum certification by the Australian Recording Industry Association (ARIA). "Everything I Wanted" peaked atop the charts in Estonia, Ireland, Latvia, Lithuania, and Norway, while achieving top-ten peaks in Austria, Belgium, and Germany.

== Music video ==
=== Background and release ===
Eilish released the self-directed music video for "Everything I Wanted" on January 23, 2020, and announced its premiere the same day on Instagram in a post captioned "something is coming". She elaborated: "My brother and I wrote this song about each other and I wanted to create a visual that emphasizes that no matter what, we'll be there for each other through everything. This is the second video I've directed of mine. We worked so hard, for hours and hours on end." Eilish wanted the video to showcase the relationship between her and her brother. During an interview with BBC Radio 1's Annie Mac, Eilish stated: "Pretty much that whole song is about me and Finneas' relationship as siblings. In the dream, the fans didn't care. The internet shit on me for killing myself, all this stuff, and it really did mess me up."

=== Synopsis ===
Eilish and her brother, Finneas O'Connell, are seen looking at each other and smiling, while holding hands

The video begins with the text "Finneas is my brother and my best friend. no matter the circumstance, we always have and always will be there for each other." Eilish is driving a car with O'Connell as a front-seat passenger; they stare ahead blankly and their bodies are expressionless. The siblings drive through a dreamscape in which many scenes are reminiscent of places in California. Eilish sings about dreaming that she had jumped off San Francisco's Golden Gate Bridge and was ignored by her loved ones and fans as depicted in the song's lyrics. O'Connell looks out of the windows as they drive through a tunnel and out of the city; they travel through a desert and past a valley, and continue through Long Beach, California, where they drive into the ocean. The car is swept away by the sea and slowly sinks and starts to fill with water. Eilish and O'Connell stare blankly as it sinks. O'Connell extends his hand, and Eilish grabs it as they look at each other and smile. The car's headlights flicker and switch off. The video ends with the siblings still holding hands as the car sinks and floods.

=== Reception ===
The music video was positively received by critics. Rebecca Alter of Vulture called the video "very good" and commented that it "looks like it was shot by the cinematographer who did 'The Long Night' on Game of Thrones". MTV's Jordyn Tilchen praised Eilish for directing the video and said her "skills shine through on this project". Layla Halabian of Nylon wrote that "the video [brings] new meaning to the saying: Blood is thicker than water." Derrick Rossignol of Uproxx called the visual a "shadowy, Eilish-directed clip", while Alyssa Quiles of Alternative Press called it "stunning". In his review for Complex, Joshua Espinoza said Eilish's message to her brother is "heartfelt". Michele Mendez of Elite Daily likened the video's story and concept of the siblings' relationship, writing that "they've got a video dedicated to their unbreakable bond". Writing for The Fader, Jordan Darville compared the video's production to that of English musician James Blake. Jarrod Johnson II of Paste magazine labeled the video as "appropriately foreboding".

== Live performances and covers ==
Eilish performed "Everything I Wanted" live for the first time at Corona Capital in Mexico City in November 2019, the final stop of her When We All Fall Asleep Tour. She performed it again during an Apple Live acoustic show at the Steve Jobs Theater in Cupertino the same year. It was later included on the set list of her Where Do We Go? World Tour (2020). Eilish performed the song live with O'Connell playing acoustic guitar for Blux in February 2020. In April of that year, the pair performed an acoustic version of "Everything I Wanted" during a 50-minute livestream for Verizon Communications.

On February 7, 2020, Alicia Keys covered "Everything I Wanted" for BBC Radio 1's Live Lounge segment. On March 9, JP Cooper and his band covered the song for Billboard; the magazine wrote that they "slowly buil[t] a lush unfurling arrangement comprised of dual guitars, piano and organ", and that Cooper "croons as he gently strums an electric guitar". Cooper told Billboard that he does not perform many covers but he felt drawn to the song, and that he and his band had a great time recording it. On March 13, Georgia recorded a cover of "Everything I Wanted" at Abbey Road Studios in London. Sam Moore of NME wrote that the cover had mixed together "elements of electro-pop and orchestral music". The same day, English indie rock band Gengahr performed a cover of the song for Triple J's Like a Version segment. Gengahr's rendition of "Everything I Wanted" was later released as a single.

== Credits and personnel ==
Credits were adapted from Tidal.

- Billie Eilish – vocals, songwriter
- Finneas O'Connell – producer, songwriter, engineer, backing vocals, drum programmer, bass, piano, synthesizer
- John Greenham – mastering engineer
- Rob Kinelski – mixer

== Charts ==
=== Weekly charts ===
Chart (2019–2021)	Peak position
Australia (ARIA)	2
Austria (Ö3 Austria Top 40)	3
Belgium (Ultratop 50 Flanders)	5
Belgium (Ultratop 50 Wallonia)	6
Canada Hot 100 (Billboard)	6
Canada AC (Billboard)	45
Canada CHR/Top 40 (Billboard)	6
Canada Hot AC (Billboard)	16
Canada Rock (Billboard)	28
CIS Airplay (TopHit)	6
Croatia International Airplay (Top lista)	31
Czech Republic Singles Digital (ČNS IFPI)	2
Denmark (Tracklisten)	4
Estonia (Eesti Tipp-40)	1
Finland (Suomen virallinen lista)	2
France (SNEP)	33
Germany (GfK)	9
Global 200 (Billboard)	82
Greece International (IFPI)	2
Hong Kong (HKRIA)	29
Hungary (Rádiós Top 40)	7
Hungary (Single Top 40)	4
Hungary (Stream Top 40)	3
Hungary (Dance Top 40)	6
Iceland (Tónlistinn)	7
Ireland (IRMA)	1
Italy (FIMI)	20
Japan Hot 100 (Billboard)	66
Latvia (LaIPA)	1
Lebanon Airplay (Lebanese Top 20)	4
Lithuania (AGATA)	1
Malaysia (RIM)	4
Mexico (Billboard Mexican Airplay)	12
Netherlands (Dutch Top 40)	7
Netherlands (Single Top 100)	4
New Zealand (Recorded Music NZ)	2
Norway (VG-lista)	1
Portugal (AFP)	5
Puerto Rico (Monitor Latino)	17
Russia Airplay (TopHit)	5
Scottish Singles Sales (Official Charts)	10
Serbia Airplay (Radiomonitor)	3
Singapore (RIAS)	4
Slovakia Airplay (ČNS IFPI)	7
Slovakia Singles Digital (ČNS IFPI)	3
South Korea (Gaon)	102
Spain (Promusicae)	16
Sweden (Sverigetopplistan)	3
Switzerland (Schweizer Hitparade)	2
UK Singles (Official Charts)	3
US Billboard Hot 100	8
US Adult Contemporary (Billboard)	23
US Adult Pop Airplay (Billboard)	5
US Dance Airplay (Billboard)	5
US Dance Club Songs (Billboard)	40
US Hot Rock & Alternative Songs (Billboard)	2
US Pop Airplay (Billboard)	5
US Rock & Alternative Airplay (Billboard)	1
US Rolling Stone Top 100	1

=== Monthly charts ===
Chart (2019)	Peak position
Latvia Airplay (LaIPA)	10

=== Year-end charts ===
Chart (2019)	Position
Hungary (Stream Top 40)	57
Latvia (LaIPA)	98
Netherlands (Dutch Top 40)	89

Chart (2020)	Position
Australia (ARIA)	38
Austria (Ö3 Austria Top 40)	74
Belgium (Ultratop Flanders)	28
Belgium (Ultratop Wallonia)	20
Canada (Canadian Hot 100)	24
CIS (Tophit)	14
Denmark (Tracklisten)	33
France (SNEP)	100
Germany (Official German Charts)	58
Hungary (Dance Top 40)	50
Hungary (Rádiós Top 40)	81
Hungary (Single Top 40)	34
Hungary (Stream Top 40)	38
Iceland (Tónlistinn)	22
Ireland (IRMA)	23
Netherlands (Single Top 100)	67
New Zealand (Recorded Music NZ)	36
Norway (VG-lista)	26
Portugal (AFP)	22
Russia Airplay (Tophit)	9
Sweden (Sverigetopplistan)	57
Switzerland (Schweizer Hitparade)	34
UK Singles (OCC)	29
US Billboard Hot 100	18
US Adult Top 40 (Billboard)	18
US Dance/Mix Show Airplay (Billboard)	17
US Hot Rock & Alternative Songs (Billboard)	20
US Mainstream Top 40 (Billboard)	17
US Rock Airplay (Billboard)	3

Chart (2021)	Position
Hungary (Dance Top 40)	26
Portugal (AFP)	126

== Certifications ==
Region	Certification	Certified units/sales
Australia (ARIA)	8× Platinum	560,000^{‡}
Austria (IFPI Austria)	2× Platinum	60,000^{‡}
Belgium (BRMA)	Platinum	40,000^{‡}
Brazil (Pro-Música Brasil)	2× Diamond	320,000^{‡}
Canada (Music Canada)	7× Platinum	560,000^{‡}
Denmark (IFPI Danmark)	2× Platinum	180,000^{‡}
France (SNEP)	Diamond	333,333^{‡}
Germany (BVMI)	Platinum	400,000^{‡}
Italy (FIMI)	Platinum	70,000^{‡}
New Zealand (RMNZ)	5× Platinum	150,000^{‡}
Norway (IFPI Norway)	2× Platinum	120,000^{‡}
Poland (ZPAV)	3× Platinum	150,000^{‡}
Portugal (AFP)	3× Platinum	30,000^{‡}
Spain (Promusicae)	2× Platinum	120,000^{‡}
United Kingdom (BPI)	3× Platinum	1,800,000^{‡}
United States (RIAA)	3× Platinum	3,000,000^{‡}
Streaming
Greece (IFPI Greece)	2× Platinum	4,000,000^{†}
Sweden (GLF)	Platinum	12,000,000^{†}
^{‡} Sales+streaming figures based on certification alone.^{†} Streaming-only figures based on certification alone.

== Release history ==
Region	Date	Format(s)	Version	Label(s)	Ref.
Various	November 13, 2019	Digital download; streaming	Original	Darkroom; Interscope	
Italy	November 22, 2019	Radio airplay	Original	Universal	
United States	December 10, 2019	Alternative radio	Original	Darkroom; Interscope	
United States	December 10, 2019	Contemporary hit radio	Original	Darkroom; Interscope	
United States	January 31, 2020 (Note: Released as a promotional single.)	Hot adult contemporary radio	Original	Darkroom; Interscope	
United States	February 3, 2020	Hot adult contemporary radio	Original	Darkroom; Interscope	
Various	February 7, 2020	Flexi disc	Original	Darkroom; Interscope	
United States	May 16, 2020	Dance radio	M+ike remix	Darkroom; Interscope	
