= Roma (soundtrack) =

2018 soundtrack album

Roma (Motion Picture Soundtrack)

Soundtrack album by Various artists
- Released: December 14, 2018
- Genres: Mexican pop; salsa; Spanish folk; R&B; jazz; classical
- Length: 65:11
- Languages: English; Spanish
- Label: Sony Masterworks
- Producers: Alfonso Cuarón; Lynn Fainchtein; Randall Poster

Music Inspired by the Film Roma

Soundtrack album by Various artists
- Released: February 8, 2019
- Genres: R&B; hip hop; jazz; electronic; Spanish folk; classical
- Length: 65:11
- Languages: English; Spanish
- Label: Sony Masterworks
- Producers: Alfonso Cuarón; Lynn Fainchtein; Randall Poster

Singles from Music Inspired by the Film Roma
- 1. "When I Was Older" Released: January 9, 2019; 2. "Tarantula" Released: January 24, 2019

Two soundtracks were released for the 2018 drama film Roma, directed by Alfonso Cuarón. Roma (Motion Picture Soundtrack) is the first one, released in conjunction with the film's Netflix premiere on December 14, 2018, featuring selections of English, Spanish and Mexican hits from early 1970s handpicked by Alfonso, the music supervisors Lynn Fainchtein and Randall Poster, who produced the album as well. Another album featured songs that were not in the film, but inspired from the musical selections of the film, titled Music Inspired by the Film Roma and was released on February 8, 2019. It consisted multi-genre numbers from popular artists that spans from various timelines, including Beck, Billie Eilish, T Bone Burnett, Patti Smith and a song from Alfonso's daughter Bu Cuaron, performing in her film debut.

== Background ==
Alfonso Cuarón, in an interview with Billboard, indicated that "music reveals a lot about a society. In Roma, the music shows a Mexico with pretensions of modernity, but still clinging to its past." He enlisted music supervisor Lynn Fainchtein to select music from the timeline, where the film was set and did extensive research of songs played in airplay during the early 1970s and the music that was authentic to Mexican city, while Randall Poster was brought earlier in the post-production process. The musical choices accurately depict Cleo and Sofi's parallel stories while most of the selections were played in the radio stations which served as the medium in the film, which depicts class inequality.

"Everything in the film was selected down to the most minuscule detail. I worked with Alfonso [Cuarón] on creating different musical environments around the house. We divided the house in terms of the music that was heard in the children's room, in the kitchen, in the living room, and that's how we went about building the musical world within Roma."

— Fainchtein in an interview to Remezcla

The sound editor Sergio Diaz did research on several sounds, like car, bird sounds, atmospheres and vendors and did "many" passes on the soundtrack, while searching for specific audio elements. He managed to "build specific moments in all worlds around the film" in order to create the neighborhood of Mexico City. Although the film features no original score, sound designers Skip Lievsay, and mixers Jose Antonio Garcia and Craig Henighan used field recordings from the background, and cues from the diegetic music integrated in the edit. The team, mixed the film in Dolby Atmos to give the viewers an "immersive experience".

At one point, Alfonso felt it would be interesting to have trans-generational and international musicians "doing one of these sounds in a piece of music". After finishing the film, Cuarón asked several musicians to watch the film, with one of the person being T Bone Burnett, whom he had sent the sounds and wrote an "amazing piece of music" derived from the sounds of street vendors from Mexico. Elaborating the process, Burnett said he turned it to a beat, which was turned into an "interesting piece of music with the sounds of street vendors being put together". At the time, he named it simply as "Roma" as "he was just working on" it and never meant it as a title song, but he felt appropriate as it ends the record.

Alfonso's daughter Bu Cuarón, had sung one of the track "Psycho" which was included in the companion album not included in the film. The song included dialogue snippets, where Cleo's mother lashes out at her, not serving as the film's dynamic but about a broader set of relationships where an anger is followed by an apology. Fainchtein listened to Bu's songs during her performance in a TV show, where Poster had suggested to include her in the album, which she called it as an "emotional experience". Bu, speaking to Variety, claimed that the album goes from melancholic and nostalgic indicating that it deals with reality.

Billie Eilish recorded the track, "When I Was Older" as an original single, released specifically for the album in January 2019. Whereas Patti Smith re-recorded her own single "Wing" from the 1996 album Gone Again, and Beck covered Colourbox's 1983 single "Tarantula". He further performed it at James Corden's The Late Late Show with Gustavo Dudamel, conducting the Los Angeles Philharmonic. Cuarón indicated their contributions saying "It's very clear that when they watched the film, they referred back to those songs and, after all these years, decided that it was the time. So if 'Roma' can serve as an excuse for that, it makes me very happy."

== Critical reception ==
Mark Kermode of The Guardian wrote "the soundtrack provides the strongest argument for seeking out a cinema with the best possible sound system and letting the movie engulf you like a roaring wave." Reviewing for the companion album, Ludovic Hunter-Tilney of Financial Times wrote "The best songs are attuned to the dreamlike, uncanny aspects of the film" giving 3.5 out of 5. Philip Sherburne of Pitchfork gave 6.7 to the album, saying "The album doesn't so much break the fourth wall as smash it to pieces with a high-tech battering ram [...] It's a reverse mood board, or at best, a kind of bizarre, sanctioned fanfic." Rob Harvilla of The Ringer wrote "Music Inspired by the Film Roma is most comfortable when those inspirations are piecemeal and incidental: It stumbles when the connection is either too explicit or not explicit enough."

== Track listing ==
Roma (Motion Picture Soundtrack)
No.	Title	Artist(s)	Length
1.	"Te He Prometido"	Leo Dan	3:07
2.	"Más Bonita Que Ninguna"	Rocío Dúrcal	2:55
3.	"No Tengo Dinero"	Juan Gabriel	3:05
4.	"La Nave del Olvido"	José José	3:31
5.	"Gracias"	Rigo Tovar	3:03
6.	"Sombras"	Javier Solís	2:57
7.	"Yellow River"	Christie	2:41
8.	"I Don't Know How to Love Him"	Yvonne Elliman	3:32
9.	"Corazón de Melón"	Orquesta Pérez Prado	2:31
10.	"Los Ojos de Pancha"	Trío Chicontepec	1:43
11.	"Mammy Blue"	Roger Whittaker	3:39
12.	"Those Were the Days"	Ray Conniff and Singers	3:29
13.	"La Casa del Sol Naciente"	Javier Bátiz	3:41
14.	"Ciudad Perdida"	La Revolución de Emiliano Zapata	4:37
15.	"Vamos a Platicar"	Los Socios del Ritmo	3:15
16.	"Mi Corazón Es un Gitano"	Lupita D'Alessio	3:43
17.	"Cuando Me Enamoro"	Angélica María	3:01
18.	"Mar y Espuma"	Acapulco Tropical	2:54
19.	"La Suegra"	Elbert Moguel y Los Strwck	3:13
Total length:			60:37

Music Inspired by the Film Roma
No.	Title	Artist(s)	Length
1.	"Tepeji 21" (The Sounds of Roma)	Ciudad de México	2:36
2.	"Wing"	Patti Smith	4:44
3.	"Tarantula"	Beck	3:47
4.	"When I Was Older"	Billie Eilish	4:31
5.	"Psycho"	Bu Cuarón	3:30
6.	"On My Knees"	Unkle feat. Michael Kiwanuka	5:28
7.	"Con el Viento"	Jessie Reyez	3:14
8.	"Marooned"	El-P and Wilder Zoby	3:06
9.	"Cumbia del Borras"	Sonido Gallo Negro	3:25
10.	"La Hora Exacta"	Quique Rangel	4:09
11.	"Cleo Who Takes Care of You"	Ibeyi	2:59
12.	"We Are Always Alone"	DJ Shadow	3:47
13.	"Between These Hands"	Asaf Avidan	5:13
14.	"Those Were the Days"	Laura Marling	3:35
15.	"Roma"	T Bone Burnett	4:02
Total length:			58:06
