= Xanny (song) =

2019 song by Billie Eilish

Song by Billie Eilish

from the album When We All Fall Asleep, Where Do We Go?
- Released: March 29, 2019
- Genre: Pop
- Length: 4:03
- Label: Darkroom; Interscope
- Songwriters: Billie Eilish; Finneas O'Connell
- Producer: Finneas O'Connell

Music video
- "Xanny" on YouTube

"Xanny" (stylized in all lowercase) is a song by American singer-songwriter Billie Eilish from her debut studio album, When We All Fall Asleep, Where Do We Go? (2019). The singer and her brother, Finneas O'Connell, co-wrote it, while the latter handled its production. Musically, it was described as a mid-tempo and jazz-influenced pop ballad. Eilish recalled being inspired by several artists during the track's creation, most notably by Frank Sinatra. Productionwise, her distorted falsetto vocals are prominently layered over a similarly deformed bass in the drop of "Xanny", replicating the feeling of secondhand smoke. Lyrically, Eilish addresses substance abuse among teenagers; she was specifically inspired by the negative effects it had on her friends and ultimately on her.

Upon its release, "Xanny" received positive reviews from music critics, with one of them likening it to the works of Sophie and Lana Del Rey. The track was accompanied by a self-directed music video released on December 5, 2019. Minimalistically produced, it depicts the singer in an all-white outfit sitting on a bench against a white background while her face is burned by disembodied hands holding cigarette butts. Reviewers praised the visual's simplicity and its correlation to the song. With the release of its parent album, "Xanny" reached number 35 on the US Billboard Hot 100. Alongside top ten peaks in several countries, it was certified platinum in the United States by the Recording Industry Association of America (RIAA). Eilish included the track on the setlists of her 2019 When We All Fall Asleep Tour and 2020 Where Do We Go? World Tour.

== Background ==
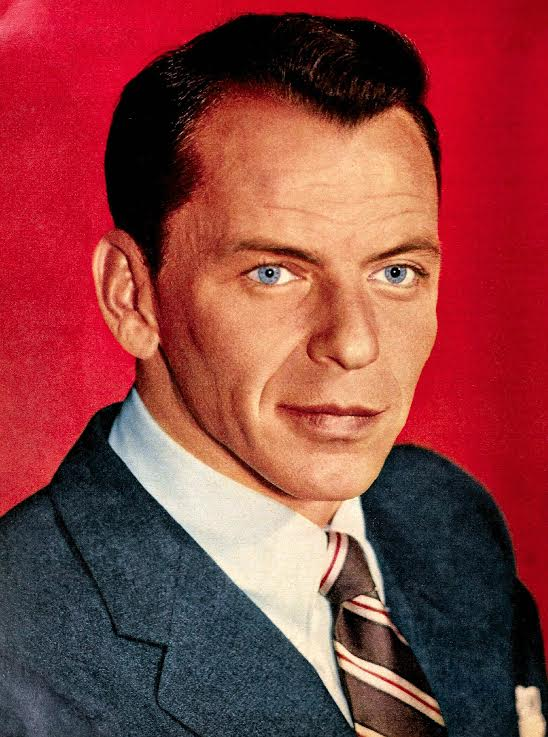
Eilish stated that she had a "very jazzy Frank Sinatra (pictured in 1957) view" on the song.

"Xanny" is the third track on Eilish's debut studio album, When We All Fall Asleep, Where Do We Go?, released for digital download and streaming on March 29, 2019, by Darkroom and Interscope Records. The song was written by the singer and her brother, Finneas O'Connell; the latter solely produced it. The duo has cited Frank Sinatra and Feist's "So Sorry" (2007) as primary influences during the creation process. They were also inspired by tracks such as LCD Soundsystem's "New York, I Love You but You're Bringing Me Down" (2007), Post Malone's "Stay" (2018), Johnny Mathis's "Misty" (1959), Daniel Caesar's "Japanese Denim" (2016) and Melody Gardot's "Who Will Comfort Me" (2009). Mastering and mixing were handled by John Greenham and Rob Kinelski, respectively. Inspiration for "Xanny" came to Eilish after seeing friends heavily inebriating themselves at a party, consequently becoming "completely not who they were". The event had, in turn, a frustrating and affecting impact on the singer. Eilish said drugs was a close subject to her, since some of her friends had died due to drug overdose; the song's last verse, described as a "melancholy blow", had been recorded two days after one's death.

The title is a reference to the drug Alprazolam, sold under the brand name Xanax. It is the most prescribed benzodiazepine—medication for anxiety and panic disorders—in the United States. Side effects of the drug include fatigue, dizziness, memory impairment, hypersensitivity, irritability, and depression. Xanax is also highly addictive and heavily misused; it is to some extent responsible for around one-third of attempts at suicide by overdose. Hannah Rose Ewens of The Guardian felt that Xanax had been glamorized by young "disaffected" SoundCloud rappers.

== Lyrics and composition ==
Eilish elaborated that the message of "Xanny" was "less 'don't do drugs' [and] more 'be safe'". She endorses what Vox's Charlie Harding described as a "teen sobriety trend" in the lines: "I'm in their secondhand smoke / Still just drinking canned Coke / I don't need a Xanny to feel better". Other "self-aware" lyrics include: "Please don't try to kiss me on the sidewalk / On your cigarette break / I can't afford to love someone / Who isn't dying by mistake in Silver Lake".

"Xanny"
A 24-second of the song's first chorus, featuring Eilish's distorted voice layered over similarly deformed bass

Musically, "Xanny" runs at a moderately slow tempo of 54–56 beats per minute (BPM), and is played in the key of A major. Eilish's vocals, which are "near-whisper[ed]" throughout, span a range between the notes of F#_{3} and E_{5}. Critical commentary described the song as a jazz-influenced mid-tempo pop ballad. While the "lulling" verses of "Xanny" utilize a jazz-inspired loop and a drumkit as instrumentation, Eilish's layered falsetto vocals are distorted for the track's "violent" drop in its refrain, and played over similarly deformed, "bone-rattling" bass. Staccato drum beats are also used throughout the song. Brendan Wetmore of Paper noted that the singer's vocals are manipulated in a way to "peak into an untapped vibrational territory".

Elaborating on the song's "weird" and unconventional sound, O'Connell told MTV that it was a point of contention with their label, although "it's kind of ironic, because [Eilish's] voice sounds so beautiful and the chords are really pretty". On the same occasion, he revealed that the "purposely distorted and clipped" sound of aforementioned SoundCloud artists influenced that of "Xanny". Eilish and O'Connell wanted the song's refrain to sound like "a girl blowing cigarette smoke into [someone's] face" and to replicate "what it feels like to be in secondhand smoke". Furthermore, their overall desire was to make people listening to the track "feel miserable".

== Reception ==
Upon release, "Xanny" was generally praised by music critics. Insider's Libby Torres said that, although the track "lacks the slick hooks or sardonic lyrics of other songs on the album", Eilish's "breathy vocals and dismissive attitude towards recreational pill use make it one of the project's hidden gems". Pitchfork's Stacey Anderson commended the lyrical content, which, according to her, "wonderfully underscore[s] how all teen angst is both fiercely sincere and an effect of being only partially informed". Brendan Wetmore, writing for Paper magazine, stated that the "extremely jarring and tone-oscillating track" was influenced by the "modern pop" genre, which, as claimed by him, was created by the likes of Sophie and Lana Del Rey. Thomas Smith of NME stated that the musical experimentation on When We All Fall Asleep, Where Do We Go? was best represented by "Xanny". While likening the track's bridge to the works of the Beatles, Variety's Chris William saw the song as "tragicomic": "[I]t's anti-drug, in an amusing, WTF-is-wrong-with-my-contemporaries kind of way".

In a negative review, Jason Lipshutz of Billboard called "Xanny" "ambitio[us]", yet not "as soaring as it needs to be", and The Independent's Roisin O'Connor deemed it "more soporific than seductive". Upon the release of When We All Fall Asleep, Where Do We Go?, Eilish broke the record for the most simultaneous US Billboard Hot 100 entries for a female artist. "Xanny" was the highest-charting non-single off the record in the territory, reaching number 35. "Xanny" further peaked at number six in all three Baltic states. It has been awarded a platinum certification by the Recording Industry Association of America (RIAA).

== Promotion ==
A screenshot from the video, featuring disembodied hands forcing cigarette butts into the face of Eilish, leaving burns

Eilish has performed "Xanny" a number of times, including for MTV in April 2019; the performance was done since Eilish had been named the channel's breakthrough artist of that month. The song was also included on the setlist of Eilish's When We All Fall Asleep Tour (2019). "Xanny" was performed at Pukkelpop in August 2019, and eventually added to the singer's Where Do We Go? World Tour (2020). In November 2019, Eilish announced the release of a self-directed music video to accompany the song; it eventually premiered on December 5. In the minimalistic visual, a brown-haired Eilish sits cross-legged on a white bench against a white background, wearing an all-white outift. The camera zooms in and out on Eilish's face while she dances robotically, performing neck, head and glazed eye movements. She remains seated for the majority of the video while disembodied hands force cigarette butts into her face, leaving burns.

The music video was positively received by music critics upon its release. While NME's Elizabth Aubrey called it "haunting", Koltan Greenwood of Alternative Press stated it was "straight forward" yet had "a few jarring visuals and some disturbing movements". Jordyn Tilchen of MTV commended the fact that the music video underscored the song's lyrics, and pointed out that the message behind the closing scene where "the singer simply gets up and walks away as smoke continues to fill the room" is "hav[ing] the power to excuse ourselves from harmful, anxiety-inducing situations". The Harvard Crimson's Tadhg Larabee wrote that "paradoxically, in being [seemingly] boring, this music video may represent an attempt by Eilish to twist pop culture's norms around drug use—another attempt to do fame differently". Justin Curto of Vulture deemed the singer's look in the music video "iconic", although opining that it made her "look like a 40-something mom". The music video was nominated for Best Direction at the 2020 MTV Video Music Awards.

== Credits and personnel ==
These credits were adapted from Tidal.

- Billie Eilish – vocals, songwriter
- Finneas O'Connell – producer, songwriter
- Rob Kinelski – mixer
- Casey Cuayo – assistant mixer
- John Greenham – mastering engineer

== Charts ==
Chart performance
Chart (2019)	Peak position
Australia (ARIA)	10
Canada Hot 100 (Billboard)	26
Czech Republic Singles Digital (ČNS IFPI)	18
Estonia (Eesti Tipp-40)	6
France (SNEP)	189
Germany (GfK)	78
Greece (IFPI)	15
Hungary (Stream Top 40)	13
Iceland (Tónlistinn)	24
Ireland (IRMA)	99
Italy (FIMI)	91
Latvia (LAIPA)	6
Lithuania (AGATA)	6
Netherlands (Single Top 100)	48
New Zealand (Recorded Music NZ)	22
Norway (VG-lista)	35
Portugal (AFP)	34
Slovakia Singles Digital (ČNS IFPI)	11
Sweden (Sverigetopplistan)	32
UK Audio Streaming (Official Charts)	21
US Billboard Hot 100	35

== Certifications ==
Certifications
Region	Certification	Certified units/sales
Australia (ARIA)	2× Platinum	140,000^{‡}
Austria (IFPI Austria)	Gold	15,000^{‡}
Brazil (Pro-Música Brasil)	3× Platinum	120,000^{‡}
Canada (Music Canada)	2× Platinum	160,000^{‡}
Denmark (IFPI Danmark)	Gold	45,000^{‡}
France (SNEP)	Gold	100,000^{‡}
New Zealand (RMNZ)	Platinum	30,000^{‡}
Poland (ZPAV)	Gold	10,000^{‡}
Portugal (AFP)	Gold	5,000^{‡}
United Kingdom (BPI)	Gold	400,000^{‡}
United States (RIAA)	Platinum	1,000,000^{‡}
^{‡} Sales+streaming figures based on certification alone.

== See also ==
- List of top 10 singles for 2019 in Australia
