= Come Out and Play (Billie Eilish song) =

2018 single by Billie Eilish

Single by Billie Eilish
- Released: November 20, 2018
- Recorded: March 2018
- Genre: Pop
- Length: 3:30
- Label: Darkroom; Interscope
- Songwriters: Billie Eilish; Finneas O'Connell
- Producer: Finneas O'Connell

Billie Eilish singles chronology
"When the Party's Over" (2018)	"Come Out and Play" (2018)	"When I Was Older" (2019)

"Come Out and Play" is a song by American singer-songwriter Billie Eilish. It was released for digital download and streaming as a single on November 20, 2018, through Darkroom and Interscope Records. Eilish wrote the song with its producer, her brother Finneas O'Connell. A lullaby-influenced midtempo pop ballad, Eilish's lyrics within the song address several topics, including her attempting to beg a friend to no longer hide away. The song was released alongside a festive commercial for technology company Apple, for which it is used as the soundtrack.

The song received mainly positive reviews from music critics, several of whom praised the music and lyrics. The song charted in various countries, including the United States and the United Kingdom, and reached the top 40 in Australia, New Zealand, Canada and Ireland. It was later included on the Japanese edition of Eilish's debut studio album, When We All Fall Asleep, Where Do We Go? (2019), along with her single "When I Was Older".

== Background and release ==
Eilish and her brother Finneas O'Connell were approached by Apple, with the company sending them an early version of a festive commercial entitled "Holiday — Share Your Gifts". The siblings then wrote the song based around the theme of the advert, recording it in their parent's home using a Mac and Logic Pro X recording studio software. The track premiered on Zane Lowe's Beats 1 radio show on November 20, 2018. "Come Out and Play" was released for digital download and streaming through the record labels Interscope Records and Darkroom on the same day as a single. The song was later included on the Japanese edition of Eilish's debut studio album, When We All Fall Asleep, Where Do We Go? in December 2019. "Come Out and Play" was written by the singer and O'Connell, and the latter solely produced the track. Mastering and mixing was handled by the studio personnel John Greenham and Rob Kinelski, respectively.

== Composition and lyrical interpretation ==
According to Musicnotes.com, "Come Out and Play" runs at a moderately slow tempo of 72 beats per minute (BPM), and is played in the key of C major. Eilish's vocals span a range between the notes of G_{3} and A_{4}. Critical commentary described the song as a lullaby-influenced mid-tempo pop ballad. Randall Colburn of Consequence of Sound said the song features "a few gentle guitar notes" and further includes a "gauzy ambiance, and textured percussion" in its instrumentation.

In an interview with Beats 1, Eilish stated: "We had never written a song about empowering yourself. Your talent and what you love is a gift to you. Whether or not you're good at it, it doesn't matter. If it's something you enjoy, share it." Lyrically, the song features Eilish trying to beg a friend to no longer hide away, tying in with the theme of the Apple commercial in which the song is used. She encourages someone to break out of their comfort zone and overcome fears: "You don't have to keep it quiet/And I know it makes you nervous/But I promise you, it's worth it/To show 'em everything you kept inside/Don't hide, don't hide." Shea Lenniger of Billboard mentioned that Eilish's vocals sound "so soft that it sounds like a lullaby": "Look up, out of your window/See snow, won't let it in though/Leave home, feel the wind blow/'Cause it's colder here inside in silence/You don't have to keep it quiet." The positive messages not only illustrated in the ad but the song itself encourage people to embrace their talents and gifts no matter what they may be. The track leaves its listeners with the message of this: you never know what opportunities lie ahead if you just put yourself out there. Ivy Sandoval writing for Soundigest, stated "the song encourage[s] people to embrace their talents and gifts no matter what they may be. It leaves listeners with the message of this: you never know what opportunities lie ahead if you just put yourself out there."

== Reception and promotion ==
"Come Out and Play" was met with generally positive reviews from music critics. Idolator's Mike Nied called the song a "serious win" and said he would not be surprised if "the track dominate[d] streaming services". Katherine Gillespie of Paper stated that the song is "designed for listening to while staring out the window at falling snow and twinkling lights". The song was praised by Insider's Claudia Willen, who called the track "heartwarming" and felt its lyrics "[do] [their] best to encourage someone to break out their comfort zone and overcome their fears". Colburn called it a "heartfelt" and "subdued", while Patrick Doyle called "come out and play" a "sprawling ballad". Milca P., writing for HotNewHipHop, commented the "dark undertones that compose Eilish's image, a Christmas song seems out of place in her catalog" but that "[Eilish] effectively layers her sound into a calming and appropriate ballad fit for any time of year". Kirsten Spruch of Billboard commended the lyrical content, which, according to her, "hit the nail on the head with the festive lyrics and sounds". Sandoval labeled the song as a "soft tune" with "clever and fun lyrics mixed with Eilish’s soft yet powerful voice makes the song perfectly balanced". Josie Balka of iHeartRadio stated she thinks "you may love it as much as I do".

The song debuted at number 69 on the US Billboard Hot 100. It also peaked at number 47 on the UK Singles Chart. The song further charted in Australia, Austria, Canada, Ireland, Latvia, the Netherlands, and Sweden. The song has notably been awarded a platinum certification by Music Canada (MC) with sales of over 80,000. Apple released an animated video for the track. In the video, the characters are scared to show their talents to the world while Eilish sings the lyrics, "You'll never know until you try it/ You don't have to keep it quiet." Thomas Smith from NME said the video "interprets those emotions and the resulting clip in the most delicate of ways, allowing hushed vocals to lead the track through to its seismic and life-affirming finale".

== Live performances ==
In December 2019, Eilish performed "Come Out and Play" live at the Steve Jobs Theater for the first annual Apple Music Awards after she won artist of the year, with O'Connell playing the acoustic guitar.

== Credits and personnel ==
Credits adapted from Tidal.

- Billie Eilish – vocals, songwriter
- Finneas O'Connell – producer, songwriter
- John Greenham – mastering engineer
- Rob Kinelski – mixer

== Charts ==
Chart performance for "Come Out and Play"
Chart (2018–2019)	Peak position
Australia (ARIA)	23
Austria (Ö3 Austria Top 40)	53
Belgium (Ultratip Bubbling Under Flanders)	9
Canada Hot 100 (Billboard)	36
Czech Republic Singles Digital (ČNS IFPI)	22
Estonia (Eesti Tipp-40)	18
Greece (IFPI)	17
Hungary (Stream Top 40)	20
Ireland (IRMA)	21
Latvia (LAIPA)	13
Lithuania (AGATA)	5
Netherlands (Single Top 100)	77
New Zealand (Recorded Music NZ)	17
Portugal (AFP)	38
Slovakia Singles Digital (ČNS IFPI)	13
South Korea (Gaon)	115
Sweden (Sverigetopplistan)	69
Switzerland (Schweizer Hitparade)	61
UK Singles (Official Charts)	47
US Billboard Hot 100	69

== Certifications ==
Certifications and sales for "Come Out and Play"
Region	Certification	Certified units/sales
Australia (ARIA)	Platinum	70,000^{‡}
Brazil (Pro-Música Brasil)	Platinum	40,000^{‡}
Canada (Music Canada)	2× Platinum	160,000^{‡}
New Zealand (RMNZ)	Platinum	30,000^{‡}
Portugal (AFP)	Gold	5,000^{‡}
Spain (Promusicae)	Gold	30,000^{‡}
United Kingdom (BPI)	Silver	200,000^{‡}
^{‡} Sales+streaming figures based on certification alone.
