= When I Was Older =

2019 single by Billie Eilish

Single by Billie Eilish

from the album Music Inspired by the Film Roma
- Released: January 9, 2019
- Recorded: November 2018
- Genre: Electronic
- Length: 4:31
- Label: Sony Masterworks
- Songwriters: Billie Eilish; Finneas O'Connell
- Producer: Finneas O'Connell

Billie Eilish singles chronology
"Come Out and Play" (2018)	"When I Was Older" (2019)	"Bury a Friend" (2019)

"When I Was Older" is a song by American singer-songwriter Billie Eilish from the soundtrack album to the film Roma (2018). It was released as a single by Sony Masterworks on January 9, 2019. Eilish wrote the song with its producer, her brother Finneas O'Connell. "When I Was Older", an electronic track with lullaby-influenced instrumentation, has lyrics heavily inspired by the film's plot. The song was later included on the Japanese and Deluxe editions of Eilish's debut album, When We All Fall Asleep, Where Do We Go? (2019).

Eilish's lyrics address misery, while she uses impressions of singing underwater. "When I Was Older" received generally positive reviews from music critics. The song reached number 11 on the US Billboard Alternative Digital Song Sales chart. It was performed live during Eilish's When We All Fall Asleep Tour and Where Do We Go? World Tour in 2019 and 2020, respectively.

== Background and release ==
On January 8, 2019, Eilish announced the release date of "When I Was Older". She stated that the song's title was inspired from a piece of dialogue spoken by the character Pepe: "When I was older I used to be a sailor, but I drowned in a storm." Eilish revealed the 2018 movie Roma, which was directed by Alfonso Cuarón and described as "domestic worker’s journey set against domestic and political turmoil in 1970s Mexico", as a major inspiration behind the song. "When I Was Older was released for digital download and streaming through record label Sony Masterworks on January 9, 2019 in various countries. Although "When I Was Older" was not in the movie, it was chosen by Cuarón to appear on the album Music Inspired by the Film Roma on February 8, 2019. The song was later included on the Japanese edition of Eilish's debut studio album, When We All Fall Asleep, Where Do We Go? in December 2019. "When I Was Older" was written by the singer and her brother Finneas O'Connell, and he also produced it. Mastering and mixing were handled by studio personnel, John Greenham and Rob Kinelski, respectively.

== Composition and lyrical interpretation ==
"When I Was Older" is moderately slow at 72-76 beats per minute (BPM). The song is played in the key of B minor, while Eilish's vocals span a range of E_{3} to A_{4}. It has been described as a lullaby-influenced uptempo-electronic track in press reviews. Derrick Rossignol of Uproxx said the song starts with "eerie" instrumentation consisting of "some bass and simple percussion". Patrick Hosken of MTV has compared "the gloomy, blippy" track to Lil Uzi Vert's "XO TOUR Llif3" (2017) and Radiohead's "Pyramid Song" (2001).

According to Eilish in a statement, "We wanted to write from within the narrative of the movie and the scenes that struck us the most from it. Having access to the sounds used in the film proved to be invaluable to help us convey this.” Wandera Hussein of The Fader said of Eilish's auto-tuned vocals coming in that it has a "drenched murmur over a sparse, tingly melody", giving the impression she's singing underwater, while sounds of the ocean are overplayed in the chorus, sounding like she is wanting to be there: “When I was older/I was a sailor on an open sea/But now I'm underwater/And my skin is paler than it should ever be." Lines like "Memories burn like a forest fire/Heavy rain turns any funeral pyre to mud/In the flood" are accompanied by the sounds of trees burning in the woods outside of a house. Daniel Kreps of Rolling Stone noted that Eilish added sounds of "student protest shouts and Borras barking" and turned them into "rhythmic percussive elements to help drive the song".

== Reception and promotion ==
"When I Was Older" was met with generally positive reviews from music critics. Idolator's Mike Nied said the song was a "standout" and "shaping up to be a rather menacing anthem". Rolling Stone's Angie Martoccio and Billboard's Angelica Acevedo called it "haunting". Rossignol stated that the song is "pretty neat". Tom Breihan of Stereogum stated that it is hard to see how "When I Was Older" has anything to do with Roma, although wrote its "themes of alienation might have some resonance" and called the track a "weirdly pretty song". Chris William of Variety praised the track for the lyrics, calling them "impressive" and also noted its "preternatural spookiness". Pitchfork editor Philip Sherburne described it as "gorgeous" and one of the soundtrack's best songs, noting that while its sound "couldn't be further from Mexico City of the 1970s", its thematic closeness to the film made it "a fitting contemporary extrapolation". "When I Was Older" experienced limited success on record charts. It peaked at number 11 on the US Billboard Alternative Digital Song Sales chart, number 7 on the New Zealand Hot Singles Chart, number 3 on the Sweden Heatseeker chart, and number 9 on the Dutch Tip Single charts.

To promote "When I Was Older", Eilish performed it at the Coachella Valley Music and Arts Festival in April, at the Glastonbury Festival in June, and at Pukkelpop in August 2019. "When I Was Older" was included on the setlist of Eilish's 2019 When We All Fall Asleep Tour, and her 2020 Where Do We Go? World Tour.

== Credits and personnel ==
Credits adapted from Tidal.

- Billie Eilish – vocals, songwriter
- Finneas O'Connell – producer, songwriter
- John Greenham – mastering engineer
- Rob Kinelski – mixer

== Charts ==
Chart performance for "When I Was Older"
Chart (2019)	Peak position
Greece (IFPI)	52
Lithuania (AGATA)	67
Netherlands (Single Tip)	18
New Zealand Hot Singles (RMNZ)	7
Sweden Heatseeker (Sverigetopplistan)	3
US Alternative Digital Song Sales (Billboard)	11

== Certifications ==
Certifications for "When I Was Older"
Region	Certification	Certified units/sales
Australia (ARIA)	Gold	35,000^{‡}
Brazil (Pro-Música Brasil)	Gold	20,000^{‡}
Canada (Music Canada)	Gold	40,000^{‡}
^{‡} Sales+streaming figures based on certification alone.
