= Rob Kinelski =

American record producer (born 1981)

- Born: Robert Michael Kinelski; January 27, 1981 (age 45); New York City, U.S.
- Genres: Pop; R&B; hip hop
- Occupations: Audio engineer; audio mixer; record producer

Robert Michael Kinelski (born January 27, 1981) is an American audio engineer, mixer, and record producer. He is best known for his work with Billie Eilish, Finneas, d4vd, Lil Dicky, Big Sean, Karol G, Joji, Beyoncé, and NewJeans, among others. In 2020, Kinelski won four Grammy Awards, including Record of the Year, Album of the Year, Best Pop Vocal Album, and Best Engineered Album, Non-Classical for mixing Billie Eilish's debut album When We All Fall Asleep, Where Do We Go?.

== Early life and education ==
Kinelski was born in Staten Island, New York. At a young age, his family relocated to nearby Howell Township, New Jersey. Kinelski graduated from Howell High School and the SAE Institute in Manhattan.

== Career ==
Kinelski started his career at Sony Studios New York, engineering for Swizz Beatz, LL Cool J, and Ryan Leslie, amongst others, notably working on Beyoncé's GRAMMY-winning album B'Day.

After relocating to Los Angeles in 2009, Kinelski collaborated with No I.D., J. Cole, Rihanna, Nas, Common, Vince Staples, Jhené Aiko, and Big Sean, and more as a member of the Cocaine 80s music collective. Since 2018, he has worked very closely with Billie Eilish and Finneas O'Connell, mixing a majority of their discography.

== Mixing discography ==
Singles and album tracks, by year, title, artist, and album name
Year	Title	Artist	Album
2009	"You Stop My Heart"	Melanie Fiona	The Bridge
2011	"Kiss Me"	Ed Sheeran	+
2012	"Loco-Motive" (featuring Large Professor)	Nas	Life Is Good
2012	"Accident Murderers" (featuring Rick Ross)	Nas	Life Is Good
2012	"Daughters"	Nas	Life Is Good
2012	"This Time" (featuring J. Cole)	Melanie Fiona	The MF Life
2012	"L.O.V.E." (featuring John Legend)	Melanie Fiona	The MF Life
2013	"3:16AM"	Jhené Aiko	Sail Out
2014	"Heavy Metal and Reflective"	Azealia Banks	Broke with Expensive Taste
2014	"Ice Princess"	Azealia Banks	Broke with Expensive Taste
2014	"Chasing Time"	Azealia Banks	Broke with Expensive Taste
2014	"Gasoline"	Troye Sivan	TRXYE
2015	"Alright"	Logic	Under Pressure
2015	"All Your Fault" (featuring Kanye West)	Big Sean	Dark Sky Paradise
2015	"I Don't Fuck with You" (featuring E-40)	Big Sean	Dark Sky Paradise
2015	"Play No Games" (featuring Chris Brown and Ty Dolla Sign)	Big Sean	Dark Sky Paradise
2015	"Outro"	Big Sean	Dark Sky Paradise
2015	"Research" (featuring Ariana Grande)	Big Sean	Dark Sky Paradise
2015	"Pieces"	Tanlines	non-album single
2015	"Save Dat Money" (featuring Fetty Wap and Rich Homie Quan)	Lil Dicky	Professional Rapper
2015	"Molly" (featuring Brendon Urie)	Lil Dicky	Professional Rapper
2015	"Lost on You"	LP	Lost on You
2016	"My Beyonce" (featuring Dej Loaf)	Lil Durk	Lil Durk 2X
2016	"She Just Wanna" (featuring Ty Dolla Sign)	Lil Durk	Lil Durk 2X
2017	"So Good" (featuring Ty Dolla Sign)	Zara Larsson	So Good
2017	"Sunday Morning Jetpack" (featuring The-Dream)	Big Sean	I Decided
2017	"Inspire Me"	Big Sean	I Decided
2017	"Bigger Than Me" (featuring Flint Chozen Choir and Starrah)	Big Sean	I Decided
2017	"Lung"	Vancouver Sleep Clinic	Revival
2017	"Someone To Stay"	Vancouver Sleep Clinic	Revival
2017	"Living Water"	Vancouver Sleep Clinic	Revival
2018	"Good Vibes" (feat. Tove Styrke)	Alma	Heavy Rules Mixtape
2018	"Hail To The Victor"	Thirty Seconds to Mars	America
2018	"Lovely" (with Khalid)	Billie Eilish	13 Reasons Why: Season 2
2018	"Crush Culture"	Conan Gray	Sunset Season
2018	"Lookalike"	Conan Gray	Sunset Season
2018	"Greek God"	Conan Gray	Sunset Season
2018	"Come Out and Play"	Billie Eilish	non-album single
2018	"Pussy is God"	King Princess	Make My Bed
2018	"Talia"	King Princess	Make My Bed
2018	"Winnebago" (with Quinn XCII and Daniel Wilson)	Gryffin	non-album single
2018	"Believer"	CYN	non-album single
2018	"Miss You"	Jez Dior	non-album single
2018	"Come and Go" (featuring Rome Ramirez)	Jez Dior	non-album single
2018	"Hotel"	Blake Rose	non-album single
2019	"When I Was Older"	Billie Eilish	Roma
2019	"Lost"	Blake Rose	non-album single
2019	"Love Alone"	Mokita	non-album single
2019	"Cold In LA"	Why Don't We	non-album single
2019	"Hit Your Heart" (with Dagny)	Steve Aoki	non-album single
2019	"Terrible Ideas"	CYN	non-album single
2019	"Bad Guy" (Justin Bieber remix)	Billie Eilish	When We All Fall Asleep, Where Do We Go?
2019	"Angel"	Finneas	non-album single
2019	"Tusa" (with Nicki Minaj)	Karol G	non-album single
2019	"Tough On Myself"	King Princess	Cheap Queen
2019	"Hit The Back"	King Princess	Cheap Queen
2020	"Everything I Wanted"	Billie Eilish	non-album single
2020	"No Time to Die"	Billie Eilish	non-album single
2020	"Ew"	Joji	Nectar
2020	"MODUS"	Joji	Nectar
2020	"Daylight"	Joji	Nectar
2020	"Gimme Love"	Joji	Nectar
2020	"Run"	Joji	Nectar
2020	"High Hopes"	Joji	Nectar
2020	"Pretty Boy"	Joji	Nectar
2020	"Afterthought"	Joji	Nectar
2020	"Like You Do"	Joji	Nectar
2021	"Lo Vas a Olvidar"	Billie Eilish, Rosalía	Euphoria: (Original Score from the HBO Series)
2021	"Good Without"	Mimi Webb	Non-album single
2022	"Save Yourself"	ONE OK ROCK	Luxury Disease
2022	"Neon"	ONE OK ROCK	Luxury Disease
2022	"Vandalize"	ONE OK ROCK	Luxury Disease
2022	"Mad Word"	ONE OK ROCK	Luxury Disease
2022	"Outta Sight"	ONE OK ROCK	Luxury Disease
2022	"Your Tears are Mine"	ONE OK ROCK	Luxury Disease
2023	"Watati"	Karol G	Barbie the Album
2023	"What Was I Made For?"	Billie Eilish	Barbie the Album

Full albums and EPs, by year and artist name
Year	Artist	Album name
2011	Common	The Dreamer/The Believer
2012	Big Sean	Detroit (mixtape)
2013	Big Sean	Hall of Fame
2014	Cozz	Cozz & Effect
2015	Le1f	Riot Boi
2015	Tanlines	Highlights
2017	Joey Badass	All-Amerikkkan Badass
2017	Billie Eilish	don't smile at me (all songs except Party Favor, Ocean Eyes)
2018	Cozz	Effected
2018	The Frights	Hypochondriac
2018	LP	Heart to Mouth
2019	Billie Eilish	When We All Fall Asleep, Where Do We Go?
2019	Milky Chance	Mind The Moon
2021	Karol G	KG0516
2021	Billie Eilish	Happier Than Ever

== Awards and nominations ==
Award	Year (Note: Indicates the year of ceremony. Each year is linked to the article about the awards held that year, wherever possible.)	Nominee(s)	Category	Result	Ref.
Grammy Awards	2020	When We All Fall Asleep, Where Do We Go?	Album of the Year	Won	
Grammy Awards	2020	When We All Fall Asleep, Where Do We Go?	Best Pop Vocal Album	Won	
Grammy Awards	2020	When We All Fall Asleep, Where Do We Go?	Best Engineered Album, Non-Classical	Won	
Grammy Awards	2020	"Bad Guy"	Record of the Year	Won	
Grammy Awards	2021	"Everything I Wanted"	Record of the Year	Won	
Grammy Awards	2022	"Happier Than Ever"	Record of the Year	Nominated	
Grammy Awards	2022	Happier Than Ever	Album of the Year	Nominated	
Grammy Awards	2022	Happier Than Ever	Best Pop Vocal Album	Nominated	
Latin Grammy Awards	2020	"Tusa"	Record of the Year	Nominated	
