= When We All Fall Asleep Tour =

2019 concert tour by Billie Eilish

- Tour by Billie Eilish
- Promotional poster for the tour
- Location: North America • Europe • Oceania
- Associated album: When We All Fall Asleep, Where Do We Go?
- Start date: April 13, 2019
- End date: November 17, 2019
- Legs: 7
- No. of shows: 35 in North America; 11 in Oceania; 20 in Europe; 66 in total
- Supporting acts: Finneas O'Connell; Denzel Curry; J Grrey; MadeinTYO; Duckwrth

Billie Eilish concert chronology
- 1 by 1 Tour (2018-19); When We All Fall Asleep World Tour (2019); Where Do We Go? World Tour (2020)

The When We All Fall Asleep World Tour (stylized in all caps) was the fourth concert tour by American singer-songwriter Billie Eilish, in support of her debut studio album When We All Fall Asleep, Where Do We Go? (2019). The tour began on April 13, 2019, in Indio, California at Empire Polo Club as part of Coachella, and concluded in Mexico City on November 17, 2019, as part of Corona Capital.

== Background and development ==
The tour was announced on February 4, 2019, via Eilish's official Instagram account. In the same post, Eilish revealed that Denzel Curry would be the opening act, and her brother Finneas O'Connell would join her for select Canadian stops. The post also hinted at blurred international dates.

Shortly thereafter, Australian tour dates were announced, and due to overwhelming demand, additional dates and larger venues were added to accommodate the larger audiences. Four days later, Eilish announced further international dates on her official Twitter account.

During the first show at Coachella, Eilish faced technical difficulties and had to cut "When I Was Older" and "Xanny" from the setlist.

Eilish performed her then-new single "Everything I Wanted" live for the first time during the tour's final stop in Mexico City.

== Set list ==
This set list is representative of the show in Dallas, Texas on October 8, 2019. It is not representative of all concerts for the duration of the tour.

1. "Bad Guy"
2. "My Strange Addiction"
3. "You Should See Me in a Crown"
4. "Idontwannabeyouanymore"
5. "Watch" / "&Burn"
6. "Copycat"
7. "When I Was Older"
8. "Wish You Were Gay"
9. "Xanny"
10. "All the Good Girls Go to Hell"
11. "Ilomilo"
12. "Bellyache"
13. "Listen Before I Go"
14. "I Love You"
15. "Ocean Eyes"
16. "When the Party's Over"
17. "Bury a Friend"
18. "Bad Guy" (reprise)
19. "Goodbye"

== Shows ==
List of concerts, showing date, city, country, venue, opening acts, tickets sold, number of available tickets and amount of gross revenue
Date	City	Country	Venue	Opening acts	Attendance	Revenue
North America
April 13, 2019 (Note: The concerts on April 13 and 20, 2019, in Indio were part of the Coachella Valley Music and Arts Festival.)	Indio	United States	Empire Polo Club	—N/a	—N/a	—N/a
April 20, 2019	Indio	United States	Empire Polo Club	—N/a	—N/a	—N/a
Oceania
April 24, 2019	Auckland	New Zealand	Spark Arena	Finneas O'Connell	9,340 / 9,629	$456,056
April 26, 2019 (Note: The concerts on April 26, 27 28, May 4, 5 and 11, 2019 were part of the Groovin' the Moo.)	Adelaide	Australia	Adelaide Showground	Finneas O'Connell	—N/a	—N/a
April 27, 2019	Maitland	Australia	Maitland Arena	Finneas O'Connell	—N/a	—N/a
April 28, 2019	Canberra	Australia	Exhibition Park	Finneas O'Connell	—N/a	—N/a
April 30, 2019	Sydney	Australia	Hordern Pavilion	Finneas O'Connell	5,376 / 5,376	$226,395
May 3, 2019	Melbourne	Australia	Margaret Court Arena	Finneas O'Connell	6,667 / 6,874	$324,174
May 4, 2019	Bendigo	Australia	Prince of Wales Showground	Finneas O'Connell	—N/a	—N/a
May 5, 2019	Townsville	Australia	Murray Sports Complex	Finneas O'Connell	—N/a	—N/a
May 7, 2019	Brisbane	Australia	Riverstage	Finneas O'Connell	8,841 / 9,022	$426,250
May 10, 2019	Fremantle	Australia	Fremantle Arts Center	Finneas O'Connell	3,331	$161,965
May 11, 2019	Bunbury	Australia	Hay International Park	Finneas O'Connell	—N/a	—N/a
Europe
May 25, 2019 (Note: The show on May 25, 2019, Middlesbrough was part of BBC Radio 1's Big Weekend.)	Middlesbrough	England	Stewart Park	—N/a	—N/a	—N/a
North America
May 29, 2019	San Francisco	United States	Bill Graham Civic Auditorium	Denzel Curry	9,011 / 9,011	$479,295
May 31, 2019 (Note: The show on May 31, 2019, in Portland was originally scheduled to take place at the Theater of the Clouds.)	Portland	United States	Moda Center	Denzel Curry	12,364 / 12,489	$659,427
June 1, 2019 (Note: The show on June 1, 2019, in Vancouver was originally scheduled to take place at the PNE Forum.)	Vancouver	Canada	PNE Amphitheater	Finneas O'Connell	7,040 / 7,112	$455,490
June 2, 2019	Redmond	United States	Marymoor Park	Denzel Curry	—N/a	—N/a
June 4, 2019 (Note: The show on June 4, 2019, in Manga was originally scheduled to take place at The Complex in Salt Lake City.)	Magna	United States	The Great Saltair	Denzel Curry	—N/a	—N/a
June 5, 2019	Morrison	United States	Red Rocks Amphitheatre	Denzel Curry	—N/a	—N/a
June 7, 2019 (Note: The show on June 7, 2019, in Independence was originally scheduled to take place at Arvest Bank Theatre at the Midland in Kansas City.)	Independence	United States	Silverstein Eye Centers Arena	Denzel Curry	—N/a	—N/a
June 8, 2019	Minneapolis	United States	Minneapolis Armory	Denzel Curry	—N/a	—N/a
June 9, 2019 (Note: The show on June 9, 2019, in Chicago was originally scheduled to take place across two shows at the Aragon Ballroom.)	Chicago	United States	United Center	Denzel Curry	—N/a	—N/a
June 11, 2019 (Note: The show on June 11, 2019, in Toronto was originally scheduled to take place at RBC Echo Beach.)	Toronto	Canada	Budweiser Stage	Denzel Curry	—N/a	—N/a
June 12, 2019	Laval	Canada	Place Bell	Denzel Curry	9,550 / 9,550	$458,479
June 14, 2019	Boston	United States	Leader Bank Pavilion	Denzel Curry	—N/a	—N/a
June 15, 2019	Philadelphia	United States	The Met Philadelphia	Denzel Curry	—N/a	—N/a
June 18, 2019	New York City	United States	Rooftop at Pier 17	Denzel Curry	—N/a	—N/a
June 19, 2019	New York City	United States	Radio City Music Hall	Denzel Curry	5,941 / 5,941	$411,070
June 20, 2019	Washington, D.C.	United States	The Anthem	Denzel Curry	6,000 / 6,000	$302,907
June 21, 2019	Nashville	United States	Ascend Amphitheater	Denzel Curry	—	—
June 23, 2019 (Note: The show on June 23, 2019, in Atlanta was originally scheduled to take place at the Coca-Cola Roxy.)	Atlanta	United States	State Bank Amphitheatre	Denzel Curry	—	—
Europe
June 27, 2019 (Note: The show on June 27, 2019, in Odense was part of Tinderbox.)	Odense	Denmark	Tusindårsskoven	—N/a	—N/a	—N/a
June 28, 2019 (Note: The show on June 28, 2019, in Stockholm was part of the Lollapalooza Sweden.)	Stockholm	Sweden	Gärdet	—N/a	—N/a	—N/a
June 30, 2019 (Note: The show on June 30, 2019, in Pilton was part of Glastonbury Festival.)	Pilton	England	Worthy Farm	—N/a	—N/a	—N/a
North America
July 6, 2019 (Note: The show on July 6, 2019, in Milwaukee was part of the Summerfest.)	Milwaukee	United States	American Family Insurance Amphitheater	—N/a	—N/a	—N/a
July 9, 2019	Los Angeles	United States	Shrine Exposition Hall	Denzel Curry	—N/a	—N/a
July 10, 2019	Los Angeles	United States	Shrine Exposition Hall	Denzel Curry	—N/a	—N/a
July 11, 2019	Los Angeles	United States	Greek Theatre	Denzel Curry	—N/a	—N/a
July 13, 2019	San Diego	United States	Cal Coast Credit Union Theatre	Denzel Curry	—N/a	—N/a
Europe
August 15, 2019 (Note: The show on August 15, 2019, in Sankt Pölten at Green Park was part of the FM4 Frequency Festival)	Sankt Pölten	Austria	Green Park	—N/a	—N/a	—N/a
August 16, 2019 (Note: The show on August 16, 2019, in Hamburg was part of the MS Dockville.)	Hamburg	Germany	Hamburg-Wilhelmsburg	—N/a	—N/a	—N/a
August 17, 2019 (Note: The show on August 16–17, 2019 in Biddinghuizen was part of the Lowlands..)	Biddinghuizen	Netherlands	Walibi Holland	—N/a	—N/a	—N/a
August 18, 2019 (Note: The show on August 18, 2019, in Hasselt was part of Pukkelpop.)	Hasselt	Belgium	Kempische Steenweg	—N/a	—N/a	—N/a
August 20, 2019	Prague	Czechia	O_{2} Arena	J Grrey	—N/a	—N/a
August 22, 2019 (Note: The show on August 22, 2019, in Zürich was part of Zürich OpenAir.)	Zürich	Switzerland	Glattbrug	—N/a	—N/a	—N/a
August 24, 2019 (Note: The concert on August 24, 2019, in Reading was part of Reading Festival.)	Reading	England	Richfield Avenue	—N/a	—N/a	—N/a
August 25, 2019 (Note: The concert on August 25, 2019, in Leeds was part of Leeds Festival.)	Leeds	England	Bramham Park	—N/a	—N/a	—N/a
August 27, 2019	Moscow	Russia	Megasport Arena	MadeinTYO	13,926 / 13,926	—N/a
August 28, 2019	Saint Petersburg	Russia	Ice Palace	MadeinTYO	12,300 / 12,300	—N/a
August 30, 2019 (Note: The show on August September 30–1, 2019 in Stradbally was part of Electric Picnic.)	Stradbally	Ireland	Stradbally Hall	—N/a	—N/a	—N/a
August 31, 2019 (Note: The show on August 31, 2019, in Milan was part of Milano Rocks.)	Milan	Italy	Area Expo	—N/a	—N/a	—N/a
September 2, 2019	Barcelona	Spain	Palau Sant Jordi	MadeinTYO	—N/a	—N/a
September 3, 2019	Madrid	Spain	WiZink Center	MadeinTYO	14,114 / 15,510	$603,039
September 4, 2019	Lisbon	Portugal	Altice Arena	MadeinTYO	18,690 / 19,469	$551,694
September 7, 2019 (Note: The show on September 7, 2019, in Berlin was part of Lollapalooza Berlin.)	Berlin	Germany	Olympiapark	—N/a	—N/a	—N/a
North America
September 15, 2019 (Note: The show on September 14–15, 2019 in Atlanta was part of Music Midtown. Billie's date TBC.)	Atlanta	United States	Piedmont Park	—N/a	—N/a	—N/a
September 20, 2019 (Note: The show on September 20, 2019, in Las Vegas was part of Life Is Beautiful Music & Art Festival.)	Las Vegas	United States	Downtown Las Vegas	—N/a	—N/a	—N/a
September 21, 2019 (Note: The show on September 21, 2019, in Las Vegas was part of the iHeartRadio Music Festival Daytime Village.)	Winchester	United States	Las Vegas Festival Grounds	—N/a	—N/a	—N/a
October 5, 2019 (Note: The concerts on October October 5 and 12, 2019 in Austin were part of Austin City Limits Music Festival.)	Austin	United States	Zilker Park	—N/a	—N/a	—N/a
October 7, 2019	Tulsa	United States	BOK Center	Duckwrth	11,393 / 11,393	$860,248
October 8, 2019	Dallas	United States	American Airlines Center	Duckwrth	11,995 / 11,995	$1,229,549
October 10, 2019	Houston	United States	Toyota Center	Duckwrth	11,506 / 11,506	$1,227,586
October 12, 2019	Austin	United States	Zilker Park	—N/a	—N/a	—N/a
November 17, 2019 (Note: The show on November 17, 2019, in Mexico City was part of Corona Capital.)	Mexico City	Mexico	Autódromo Hermanos Rodríguez	—N/a	—N/a	—N/a
Total					—	—

=== Cancelled shows ===
July 20, 2019	Foxborough	Gillette Stadium (Mad Decent Block Party)	Festival cancelled.

== Accolades ==
Award	Year (Note: Indicates the year of ceremony. Each year is linked to the article about the awards held that year, wherever possible.)	Category	Result	Ref.
Pollstar Awards	2020	Best Pop Tour	Nominated	
