= 1 by 1 Tour =

2018–2019 concert tour by Billie Eilish

- Tour by Billie Eilish
- Promotional poster example
- Location: Europe; North America
- Associated album: Don't Smile at Me
- Start date: October 20, 2018
- End date: March 9, 2019
- No. of shows: 44
- Supporting acts: Childish Major; EarthGang; Finneas

Billie Eilish concert chronology
- Where's My Mind Tour (2018); 1 by 1 Tour (2018–2019); When We All Fall Asleep Tour (2019)

The 1 by 1 Tour (stylized in all lowercase) was the third concert tour by American singer-songwriter Billie Eilish, launched in support of her debut EP Don't Smile at Me (2017). The tour began on October 20, 2018 in Oakland, California, and concluded on March 9, 2019 in Barcelona, Spain.

The tour was first announced with its North American dates on July 23, 2018, and the European leg was later announced on July 27, 2018.

== Set list ==
This set list is representative of the tour's final concert on March 9, 2019, in Barcelona, Spain. It does not represent all dates throughout the tour. Eilish performed 8 songs from Don't Smile at Me, 5 standalone singles and 4 songs from When We All Fall Asleep, Where Do We Go?.

1. "My Boy"
2. "Idontwannabeyouanymore"
3. "Lovely"
4. "Bored"
5. "When I Was Older"
6. "Party Favor"
7. "Wish You Were Gay"
8. "Bitches Broken Hearts"
9. "Six Feet Under"
10. "Watch" / "&Burn"
11. "You Should See Me in a Crown"
12. "Hostage"
13. "Bury a Friend"
14. "Bellyache"
15. "When the Party's Over"
16. "Ocean Eyes"
17. "Copycat"
18. "6.18.18" (unreleased)

== Shows ==
List of concerts showing date, city, country and venue
| Date | City | Country | Venue | Opening acts |
Leg 1 – North America
| October 20, 2018 | Oakland | United States | Fox Theatre | Childish Major; Finneas |
| October 21, 2018 | Sacramento | United States | Ace of Spades | Childish Major; Finneas |
| October 23, 2018 | Portland | United States | Roseland Theater | Childish Major; Finneas |
| October 24, 2018 | Seattle | United States | The Showbox | Childish Major; Finneas |
| October 28, 2018 | Chicago | United States | Metro | Childish Major; Finneas |
| October 30, 2018 | Toronto | Canada | Phoenix Concert Theatre | Childish Major; Finneas |
| October 31, 2018 | Toronto | Canada | Phoenix Concert Theatre | Childish Major; Finneas |
| November 2, 2018 | Boston | United States | House of Blues | Childish Major; Finneas |
| November 3, 2018 | New York | United States | Irving Plaza | Childish Major; Finneas |
| November 4, 2018 | Philadelphia | United States | Union Transfer | Childish Major; Finneas |
| November 5, 2018 | New York | United States | Brooklyn Steel | Childish Major; Finneas |
| November 7, 2018 (5:30 PM) | Washington, D.C. | United States | 9:30 Club | Childish Major; Finneas |
| November 7, 2018 (8:30 PM) | Washington, D.C. | United States | 9:30 Club | Childish Major; Finneas |
| November 9, 2018 | Atlanta | United States | Variety Playhouse | Childish Major; Finneas |
| November 13, 2018 | Dallas | United States | Granada Theater | Childish Major; Finneas |
| November 14, 2018 | Austin | United States | Emo's | Childish Major; Finneas |
| November 16, 2018 | Phoenix | United States | The Van Buren | Childish Major; Finneas |
| November 17, 2018 | San Diego | United States | Soma (mainstage) | Childish Major; Finneas |
| November 20, 2018 | Los Angeles | United States | The Fonda Theatre | Childish Major; Finneas |
| November 21, 2018 | Los Angeles | United States | The Fonda Theatre | Childish Major; Finneas |
| November 23, 2018 | Los Angeles | United States | The Fonda Theatre | Childish Major; Finneas |
| December 9, 2018 (Note: The show on December 9, 2018 was part of KROQ Almost Acoustic Christmas.) | Inglewood | United States | The Forum | —N/a |
| December 10, 2018 (Note: The show on December 10, 2018 was part of KNRK's December to Remember.) | Portland | United States | Crystal Ballroom | —N/a |
| December 11, 2018 (Note: The show on December 11, 2018 was part of KNDD's Deck the Hall Ball.) | Seattle | United States | WaMu Theater | —N/a |
| December 12, 2018 (Note: The show on December 12, 2018 was part of the Alt 98.7 Share the Love Benefit Show.) | Los Angeles | United States | Wiltern Theatre | —N/a |
| December 14, 2018 (Note: The show on December 14, 2018 was part of 91X Wrex the Halls.) | San Diego | United States | Pechanga Arena | —N/a |
Leg 2 – Europe
| February 11, 2019 | Berlin | Germany | Kesselhaus in der Kulturbrauerei | EarthGang; Finneas |
| February 12, 2019 | Hamburg | Germany | Uebel & Gefährlich | EarthGang; Finneas |
| February 13, 2019 | Copenhagen | Denmark | Vega | EarthGang; Finneas |
| February 15, 2019 | Stockholm | Sweden | Fryshuset | EarthGang; Finneas |
| February 17, 2019 | Frankfurt | Germany | Gibson | EarthGang; Finneas |
| February 18, 2019 | Paris | France | La Cigale | EarthGang; Finneas |
| February 21, 2019 | Milan | Italy | Fabrique | EarthGang; Finneas |
| February 22, 2019 | Zürich | Switzerland | Halle 622 | EarthGang; Finneas |
| February 24, 2019 | Utrecht | Netherlands | TivoliVredenburg (Ronda) | EarthGang; Finneas |
| February 25, 2019 | Brussels | Belgium | Salle de la Madeleine | EarthGang; Finneas |
| February 27, 2019 | Manchester | England | Manchester Academy | EarthGang; Finneas |
| February 28, 2019 | Glasgow | Scotland | SWG3 | EarthGang; Finneas |
| March 2, 2019 | Birmingham | England | O_{2} Institute | EarthGang; Finneas |
| March 4, 2019 | London | England | O_{2} Shepherd's Bush Empire | EarthGang; Finneas |
| March 5, 2019 | London | England | O_{2} Shepherd's Bush Empire | EarthGang; Finneas |
| March 6, 2019 | London | England | O_{2} Shepherd's Bush Empire | EarthGang; Finneas |
| March 7, 2019 (7 PM) | London | England | PRYZM Kingston | EarthGang; Finneas |
| March 7, 2019 (9 PM) (Note: The second show on March 7, 2019 was an acoustic set played as part of the New Slang club night.) | London | England | PRYZM Kingston | —N/a |
| March 9, 2019 | Barcelona | Spain | Sant Jordi Club | EarthGang; Finneas |
