= List of songs recorded by Billie Eilish =

Songwriting history

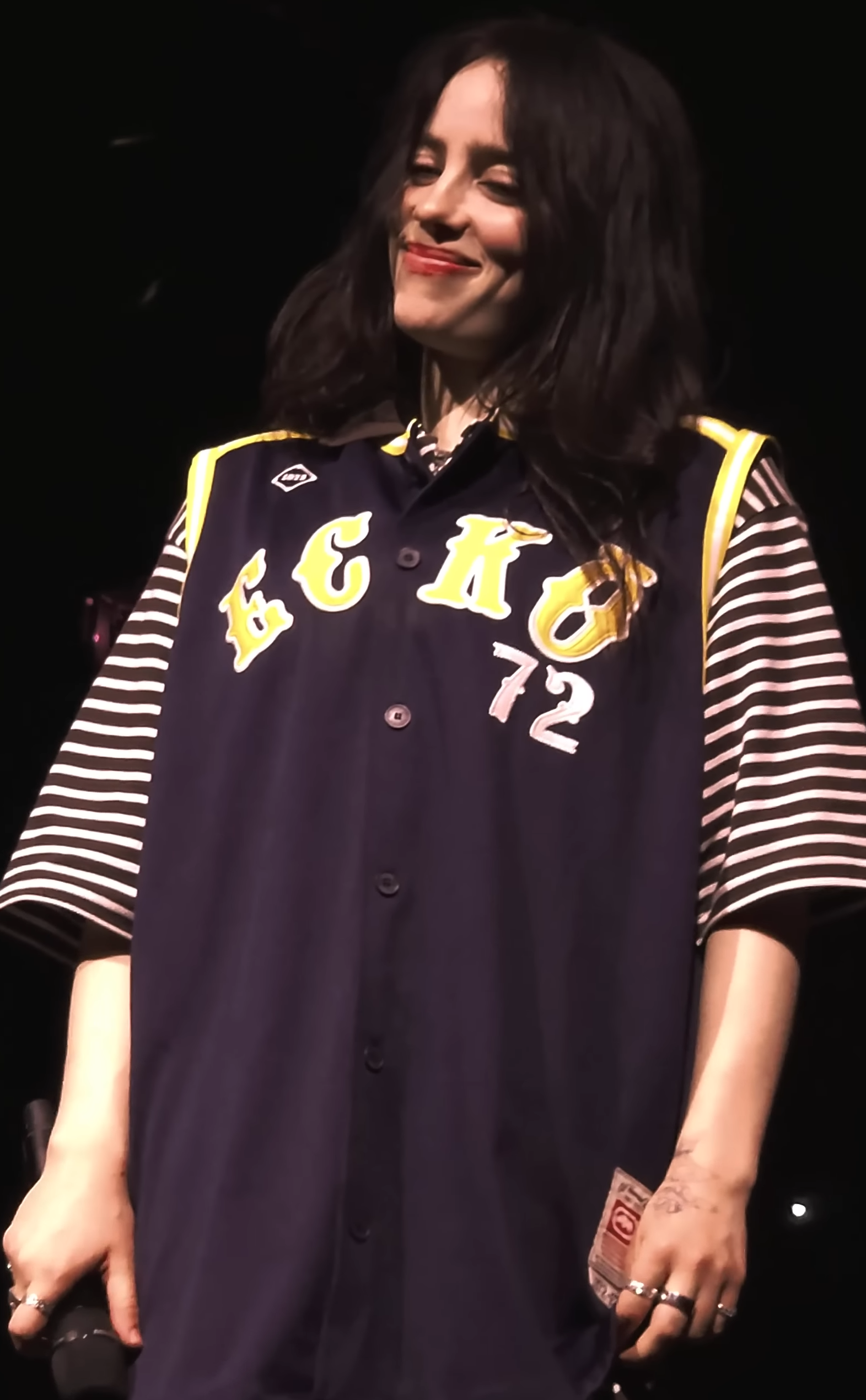
Eilish in 2024

American singer-songwriter Billie Eilish has co-written almost every song in her discography with her brother, Finneas O'Connell, who produces most of them. In 2015, she uploaded three songs to SoundCloud: "Fingers Crossed", "She's Broken", and "Ocean Eyes". Eilish wrote "Fingers Crossed" by herself, whereas "She's Broken" and "Ocean Eyes" were written by Finneas. Out of these three, "Ocean Eyes" became an instant hit; it led her to being signed to Darkroom and Interscope Records the following year. In August 2017, Eilish released her debut EP Don't Smile at Me. It was written by Eilish alongside Finneas, and primarily includes electropop songs with influences of R&B and jazz. "&Burn" and "Lovely" were collaborations with Vince Staples and Khalid, respectively. Eilish's songs have also appeared on soundtracks—"Ocean Eyes" on Everything, Everything (Original Motion Picture Soundtrack) (2017), "Bored" on 13 Reasons Why (A Netflix Original Series Soundtrack) (2017), and "Lovely" on 13 Reasons Why: Season 2 (Music from the Original TV Series) (2018).

Her debut studio album, When We All Fall Asleep, Where Do We Go?, was issued in March 2019, and featured the globally successful and her first Billboard Hot 100 number-one single "Bad Guy", for which a remix with Justin Bieber was eventually released. Further singles to aid the record included "You Should See Me in a Crown", "When the Party's Over", "Bury a Friend" and "Wish You Were Gay". Musically, When We All Fall Asleep, Where Do We Go? was described by critics as a pop, electropop, avant-pop, and art pop effort. Its songs explore themes such as modern youth, heartbreak, suicide, and mental health, with lyrical sensibilities of humor and horror; Eilish said the album was inspired by lucid dreaming and night terrors. From late 2019 to early 2021, Eilish released several commercially successful singles—"Everything I Wanted", "No Time to Die", "My Future", "Therefore I Am" and "Lo Vas a Olvidar"—with the latter being a collaboration with Rosalía for the television series Euphoria. Eilish released her second studio album, Happier Than Ever, on July 30, 2021. On May 17, 2024, she released her third studio album, Hit Me Hard and Soft.

== Songs ==
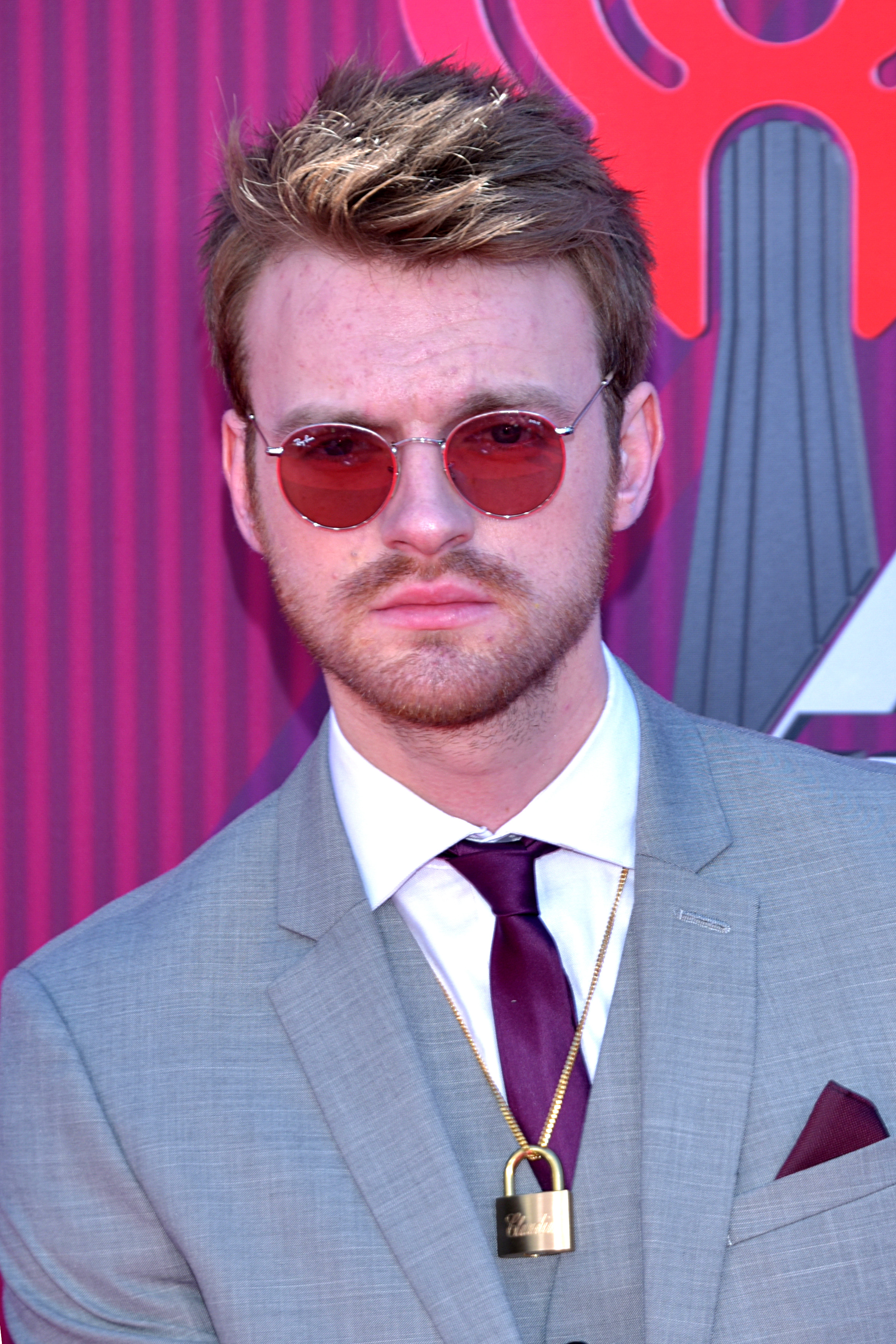
Eilish's brother, Finneas O'Connell, produced and co-wrote a large majority of Eilish's songs.

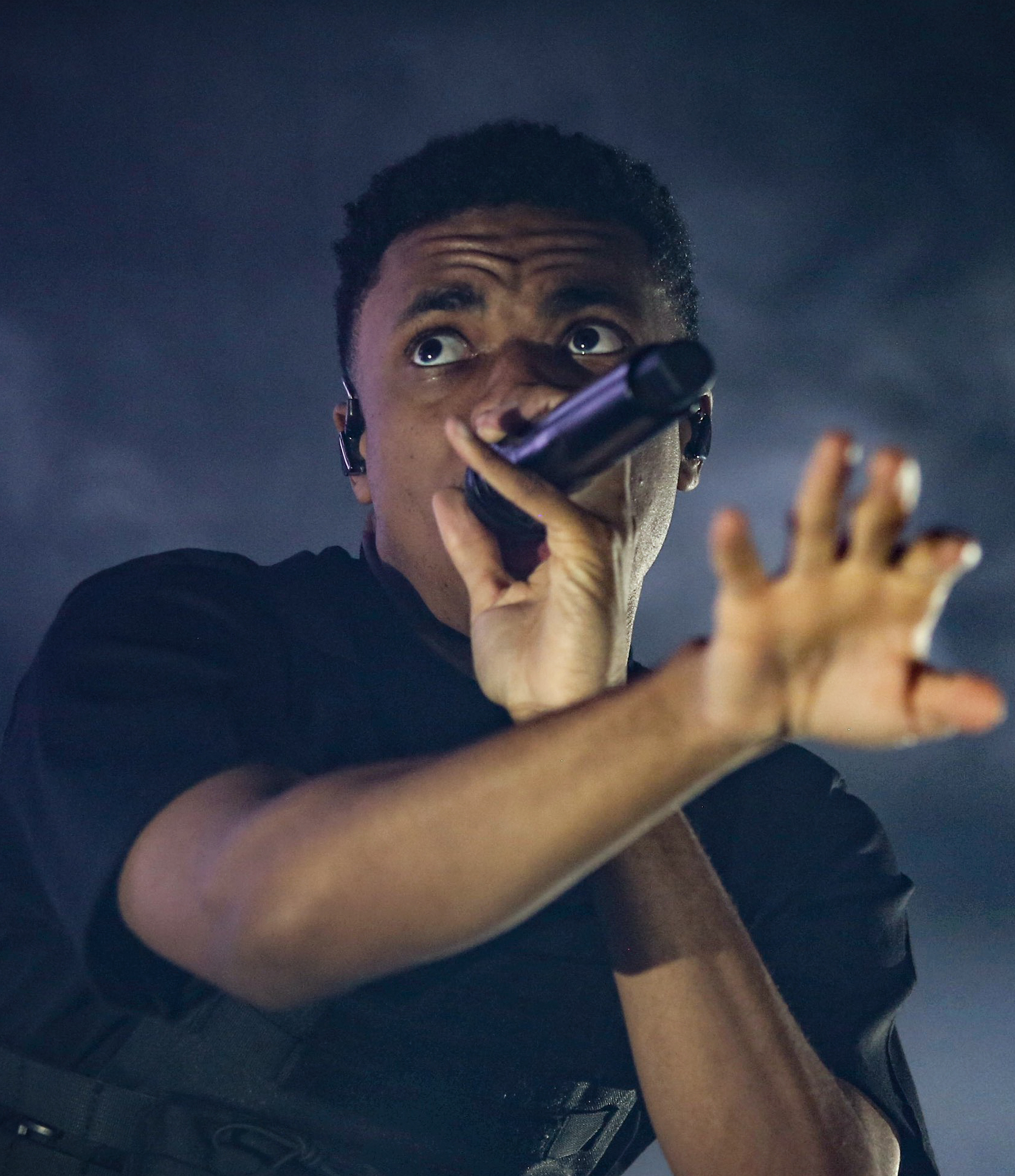
Eilish collaborated with Vince Staples for "&Burn".

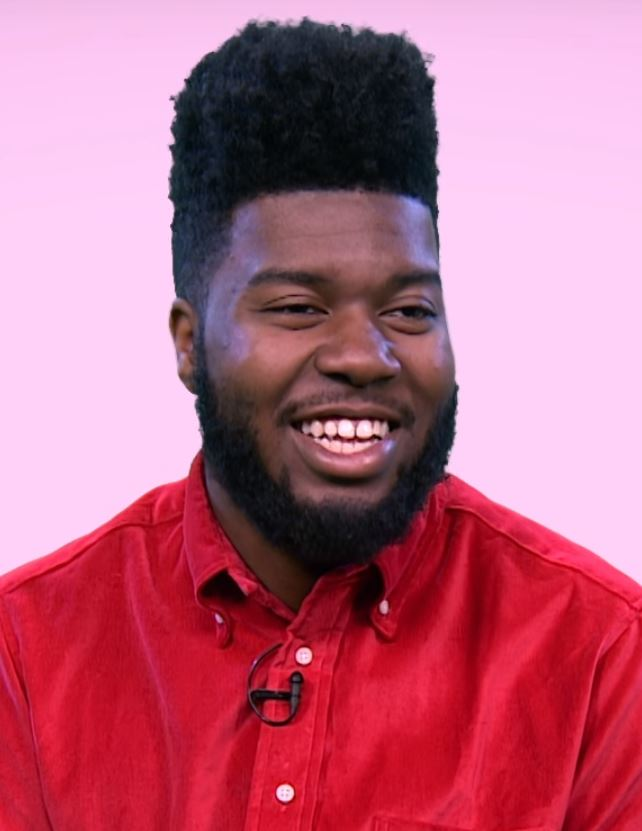
Khalid was featured on "Lovely", the lead single of the soundtrack 13 Reasons Why: Season 2 (Music from the Original TV Series).

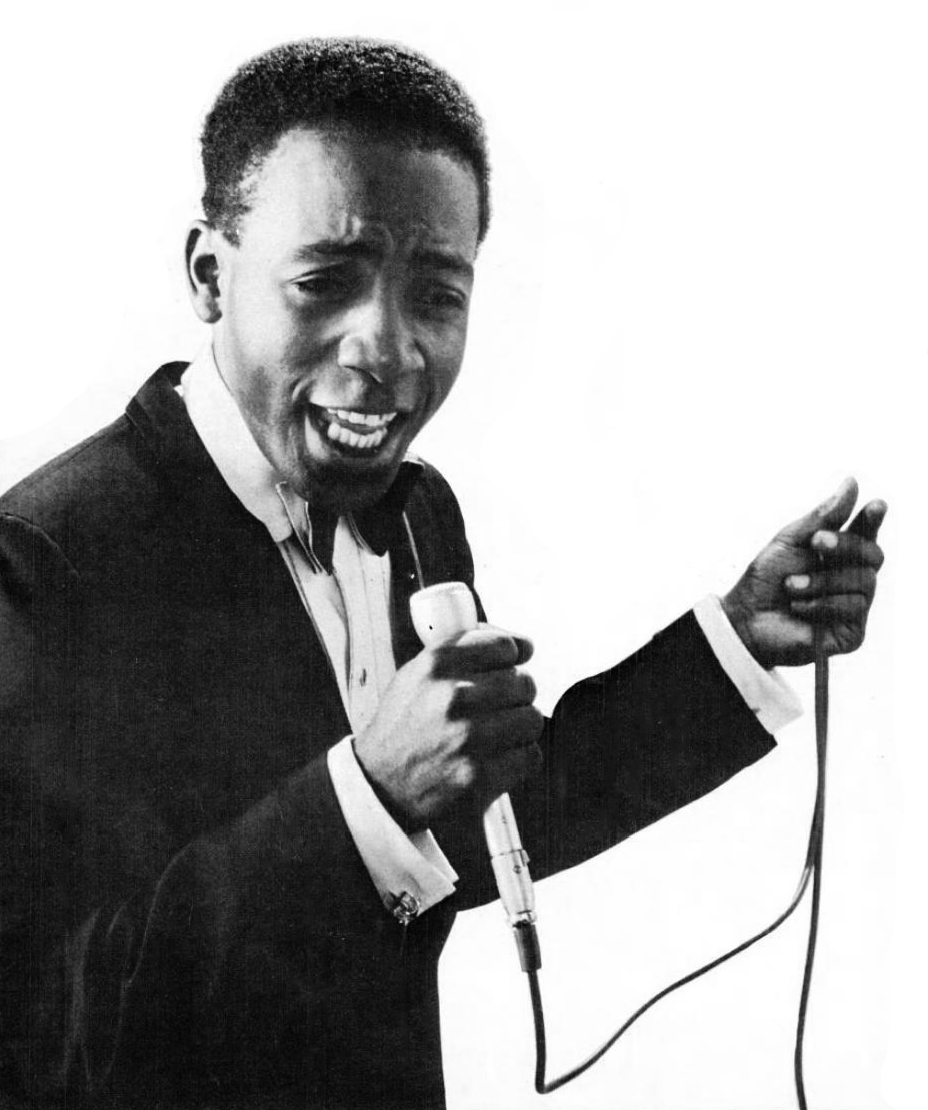
Eilish and Finneas covered Bobby Hebb's "Sunny" (1966) for the COVID-19 benefit event One World: Together at Home in April 2020.

Name of song, featured performers, writers, originating album, and year released
Song	Writer(s)	Album/EP/Single(s)	Year	Ref.
"!!!!!!!"	Billie Eilish O'Connell; Finneas O'Connell	When We All Fall Asleep, Where Do We Go?	2019	
"&Burn" (Note: Vince Staples acts as a lead artist on "&Burn" alongside Eilish.)	Vince Staples; Finneas O'Connell	Non-album single	2017	
"The 30th"	Billie Eilish O'Connell; Finneas O'Connell	Guitar Songs	2022	
"8"	Billie Eilish O'Connell; Finneas O'Connell	When We All Fall Asleep, Where Do We Go?	2019	
"All the Good Girls Go to Hell"	Billie Eilish O'Connell; Finneas O'Connell	When We All Fall Asleep, Where Do We Go?	2019	
"Bad Guy"	Billie Eilish O'Connell; Finneas O'Connell	When We All Fall Asleep, Where Do We Go?	2019	
"Blue"	Billie Eilish O'Connell; Finneas O'Connell	Hit Me Hard and Soft	2024	
"Bellyache"	Billie Eilish O'Connell; Finneas O'Connell	Don't Smile at Me	2017	
"Billie Bossa Nova"	Billie Eilish O'Connell; Finneas O'Connell	Happier Than Ever	2021	
"Birds of a Feather"	Billie Eilish O'Connell; Finneas O'Connell	Hit Me Hard and Soft	2024	
"Bitches Broken Hearts"	Billie Eilish O'Connell; Finneas O'Connell; Emmit Fenn	Non-album single	2018	
"Bittersuite"	Billie Eilish O'Connell; Finneas O'Connell	Hit Me Hard and Soft	2024	
"Bored"	Billie Eilish O'Connell; Finneas O'Connell; Aron Forbes; Tim Anderson	Thirteen Reasons Why (A Netflix Original Series Soundtrack)	2017	
"Bury a Friend"	Billie Eilish O'Connell; Finneas O'Connell	When We All Fall Asleep, Where Do We Go?	2019	
"Chihiro"	Billie Eilish O'Connell; Finneas O'Connell	Hit Me Hard and Soft	2024	
"Come Out and Play"	Billie Eilish O'Connell; Finneas O'Connell	Non-album single	2018	
"Copycat"	Billie Eilish O'Connell; Finneas O'Connell	Don't Smile at Me	2017	
"The Diner"	Billie Eilish O'Connell; Finneas O'Connell	Hit Me Hard and Soft	2024	
"Everybody Dies"	Billie Eilish O'Connell; Finneas O'Connell	Happier Than Ever	2021	
"Everything I Wanted"	Billie Eilish O'Connell; Finneas O'Connell	Non-album single	2019	
"Fingers Crossed"	Billie Eilish O'Connell	None	2015	
"Getting Older"	Billie Eilish O'Connell; Finneas O'Connell	Happier Than Ever	2021	
"Goldwing"	Billie Eilish O'Connell; Finneas O'Connell	Happier Than Ever	2021	
"Goodbye"	Billie Eilish O'Connell; Finneas O'Connell	When We All Fall Asleep, Where Do We Go?	2019	
"The Greatest"	Billie Eilish O'Connell; Finneas O'Connell	Hit Me Hard and Soft	2024	
"Guess featuring Billie Eilish" (Note: Charli XCX acts as a lead artist on "Guess featuring Billie Eilish".)	Charlotte Aitchison; Billie Eilish O'Connell; Harrison Patrick Smith; Dylan Brady; Finneas O'Connell	Brat and It's Completely Different but Also Still Brat	2024	
"Halley's Comet"	Billie Eilish O'Connell; Finneas O'Connell	Happier Than Ever	2021	
"Happier Than Ever"	Billie Eilish O'Connell; Finneas O'Connell	Happier Than Ever	2021	
"Hostage"	Billie Eilish O'Connell; Finneas O'Connell	Don't Smile at Me	2017	
"Hotline Bling" (Note: "Hotline Bling" is a cover of Drake's song of the same name.)	Aubrey Graham; Paul Jefferies; Timmy Thomas	None	2018	
"I Didn't Change My Number"	Billie Eilish O'Connell; Finneas O'Connell	Happier Than Ever	2021	
"I Love You"	Billie Eilish O'Connell; Finneas O'Connell	When We All Fall Asleep, Where Do We Go?	2019	
"Idontwannabeyouanymore"	Billie Eilish O'Connell; Finneas O'Connell	Don't Smile at Me	2017	
"Ilomilo"	Billie Eilish O'Connell; Finneas O'Connell	When We All Fall Asleep, Where Do We Go?	2019	
"L'Amour de Ma Vie"	Billie Eilish O'Connell; Finneas O'Connell	Hit Me Hard and Soft	2024	
"Listen Before I Go"	Billie Eilish O'Connell; Finneas O'Connell	When We All Fall Asleep, Where Do We Go?	2019	
"Lo Vas a Olvidar" (Note: Rosalía acts as a lead artist on "Lo Vas a Olvidar" alongside Eilish.)	Rosalia Vila Tobella; Billie Eilish O'Connell; Finneas O'Connell; Pablo Díaz-Reixa	Non-album single	2021	
"Lost Cause"	Billie Eilish O’Connell; Finneas O’Connell	Happier Than Ever	2021	
"Lovely" (Note: Khalid acts as a lead artist on "Lovely" alongside Eilish.)	Billie Eilish O'Connell; Finneas O'Connell; Khalid	Thirteen Reasons Why: Season 2 (Music from the Original TV Series)	2018	
"Lunch"	Billie Eilish O'Connell; Finneas O'Connell	Hit Me Hard and Soft	2024	
"Male Fantasy"	Billie Eilish O'Connell; Finneas O'Connell	Happier Than Ever	2021	
"My Boy"	Billie Eilish O'Connell; Finneas O'Connell	Don't Smile at Me	2017	
"My Future"	Billie Eilish O'Connell; Finneas O'Connell	Happier Than Ever	2020	
"My Strange Addiction"	Billie Eilish O'Connell; Finneas O'Connell	When We All Fall Asleep, Where Do We Go?	2019	
"NDA"	Billie Eilish O'Connell; Finneas O'Connell	Happier Than Ever	2021	
"No Time to Die"	Billie Eilish O'Connell; Finneas O'Connell	No Time to Die	2020	
"Not My Responsibility"	Billie Eilish O'Connell; Finneas O'Connell	Happier Than Ever	2021	
"Ocean Eyes"	Finneas O'Connell	Don't Smile at Me; Everything, Everything (Original Motion Picture Soundtrack)	2016	
"Overheated"	Billie Eilish O'Connell; Finneas O'Connell	Happier Than Ever	2021	
"Oxytocin"	Billie Eilish O'Connell; Finneas O'Connell	Happier Than Ever	2021	
"Party Favor"	Billie Eilish O'Connell; Finneas O'Connell	Don't Smile at Me	2018	
"She's Broken"	Finneas O'Connell	None	2015	
"Six Feet Under"	Finneas O'Connell	Non-album single	2016	
"Skinny"	Billie Eilish O'Connell; Finneas O'Connell	Hit Me Hard and Soft	2024	
"Sunny" (Note: "Sunny" is a cover of Bobby Hebb's song of the same name.)	Bobby Hebb	One World: Together at Home	2020	
"Therefore I Am"	Billie Eilish O'Connell; Finneas O'Connell	Happier Than Ever	2020	
"TV"	Billie Eilish O'Connell; Finneas O'Connell	Guitar Songs	2022	
"Watch"	Finneas O'Connell	Don't Smile at Me	2017	
"What Was I Made For?"	Billie Eilish O'Connell; Finneas O'Connell	Barbie the Album	2023	
"When I Was Older"	Billie Eilish O'Connell; Finneas O'Connell	Non-album single	2019	
"When the Party's Over"	Finneas O'Connell	When We All Fall Asleep, Where Do We Go?	2019	
"Wildflower"	Billie Eilish O'Connell; Finneas O'Connell	Hit Me Hard and Soft	2024	
"Wish You Were Gay"	Billie Eilish O'Connell; Finneas O'Connell	When We All Fall Asleep, Where Do We Go?	2019	
"Xanny"	Billie Eilish O'Connell; Finneas O'Connell	When We All Fall Asleep, Where Do We Go?	2019	
"You Should See Me in a Crown"	Billie Eilish O'Connell; Finneas O'Connell	When We All Fall Asleep, Where Do We Go?	2018	
"Your Power"	Billie Eilish O'Connell; Finneas O'Connell	Happier Than Ever	2021	

== See also ==
- Billie Eilish discography
