= Where's My Mind Tour =

2018 concert tour by Billie Eilish

- Tour by Billie Eilish
- Location: Europe • North America
- Associated album: Don't Smile at Me
- Start date: February 14, 2018
- End date: April 7, 2018
- No. of shows: 28

Billie Eilish concert chronology
- Don't Smile at Me Tour (2017); Where's My Mind Tour (2018); 1 by 1 Tour (2018-19)

The Where's My Mind Tour (stylized as wheres my mind tour) was the second headlining concert tour by American singer-songwriter Billie Eilish. It was in support of her debut EP Don't Smile at Me (2017), and consisted of concerts in North America and Europe. The tour was announced in November 2017, with dates being released at the same time. The set list featured a majority of the songs from Don't Smile at Me. The tour was positively received by critics.

== Background and development ==
In November 2017, Billie Eilish announced her second concert tour, the Where's My Mind Tour, to her first major-label EP, Don't Smile at Me (2017). Tour dates and locations were released on the same day. The setlist included all of the songs from Don't Smile at Me, including a cover of Drake's "Hotline Bling" and Eilish's brother Finneas O'Connell, performing his single "New Girl".

== Synopsis ==
In North America, Eilish started the tour with a performance of "Bellyache". She would throw her hair around, stick her tongue out, and jump around. Eilish's brother and producer Finneas O'Connell, would perform his 2016 single "New Girl". Eilish would perform a cover of rapper Drake's "Hotline Bling" on a ukulele and Finneas would play an acoustic guitar. The cover would later transition into "Party Favor". She would perform an unreleased song called "When the Party's Over".

Eilish's performance at the Black Cat was opened by Reo Cragun and DJ Kieroglyphics. Eilish would start the show off with "Bellyache". She then moved into "Idontwannabeyouanymore" and "Watch". "Watch" was blended with "&Burn". Eilish would rap the verse of Vince Staples. After continuing with "Bored" and "Six Feet Under", she invited her brother, Finneas, to perform one of his own songs "New Girl". After Finneas finished performing, Eilish would come back out, holding a ukulele. She would sing "Hotline Bling" before segueing into "Party Favor". Eilish would usually talk to the audience in between songs, and say stuff like: "I want to thank you guys for existing." When performing "When the Party's Over", she told the crowd to put away the phones, saying "If you just look up and look at me." Eilish then sang "Ocean Eyes", with an a capella singalong, and after it concluded Eilish exclaimed: “You guys hit a spot in my heart!" She would then perform "My Boy", making the audience dance and shout. She would shush them as she sang "Hostage". She noted that the crowd was one of the best she ever had and asked them to "jump like a kangaroo" for the last song "Copycat". The audience obliged and when the concert was over Eilish jumped into the arms of the crowd.

In Europe, Eilish would open with "Bellyache". She would then perform "&Burn". The recorded version features America rapper Vince Staples, but it was performed live Eilish without him. It would begin with the original arrangement before the beat drops and Eilish would break into dance. Eilish would sing "Six Feet Under", Eilish chants the crowd with "fuck that hoe" having explained that two years ago she'd spent the day with a boy, going to see a movie and after their first kiss that night he let her know it was as magical as he believed. She then plays the unreleased song, saying "how could I say I like you like that". Eilish would finish with "Copycat", red lights would flash as Eilish sang it.

== Reception ==
Nicole Almeida of Atwood Magazine praised the show, writing that everybody who knew good music would know Eilish's name, and those who didn't would be bound to "discover it very soon because it is evident she is set on a path to worldwide stardom." Eilish's performance at The Bowery Ballroom was praised by the staff of Billboard magazine. Lyndsay Havens described the performance as "explosive" and said it was "at times tender, and entirely exciting". She further mentioned that the performance was "the type of show where you are acutely aware that the artist you are currently watching will outgrow the venue they are playing almost immediately". The staff of The Gazette, said Eilish "want[ed] to bring the audience into her world, creating an experience for them". Writing for The Line of Best Fit, Matthew Kent described the show as "genius", "bewitching" and "powerful" He continued, writing that not only was the show amazing because of Eilish's talent, but the "devotion, love and passion of the all the fans in that room."

== Set list ==
This setlist is not representative of all concerts for the duration of the tour.

1. "bellyache"
2. "idontwannabeyouanymore"
3. "watch"
4. "&Burn"
5. "Bored"
6. "Six Feet Under"
7. "New Girl"
8. "Hotline Bling" / party favor"
9. "When the Party's Over"
10. "ocean eyes"
11. "my boy"

Encore

13. "hostage"
14. "COPYCAT"

== Tour dates ==
List of concerts, showing date, city, country, and venue
Date (2018)	City	Country	Venue
Europe
February 14	London	England	Heaven
February 16	Paris	France	Petit Bain
February 18	Milan	Italy	Dude Club
February 19	Stockholm	Sweden	Debaser Strand
February 20	Amsterdam	Netherlands	Melkweg
February 23	Brussels	Belgium	Le Botanique
February 26	Berlin	Germany	Lido
February 27	Cologne	Germany	Jungle Club
March 1	Oslo	Norway	by:Larm
North America
March 7	Los Angeles	United States	El Rey Theatre
March 8	San Francisco	United States	Great American Music Hall
March 9	Los Angeles	United States	El Rey Theater
March 10	San Diego	United States	Music Box
March 11	Santa Ana	United States	The Observatory
March 17	Atlanta	United States	Terminal West
March 20	Washington, D.C.	United States	Black Cat
March 23	New York City	United States	Bowery Ballroom
March 24	Boston	United States	Paradise Rock Club
March 25	Philadelphia	United States	Coda
March 26	New York City	United States	Bowery Ballroom
March 27	Montreal	Canada	Théâtre Fairmount
March 28	Toronto	Canada	Mod Club Theatre
March 30	Detroit	United States	El Club
March 31	Chicago	United States	Lincoln Hall
April 3	Minneapolis	United States	First Avenue
April 4	Kansas City	United States	recordBar
April 6	Denver	United States	Bluebird Theater
April 7	Salt Lake City	United States	The Complex
