= Don't Smile at Me Tour =

2017 concert tour by Billie Eilish

- Tour by Billie Eilish
- Location: North America • Europe
- Associated album: Don't Smile at Me
- Start date: October 4, 2017
- End date: November 2, 2017
- No. of shows: 17

Billie Eilish concert chronology
- Don't Smile at Me Tour (2017); Where's My Mind Tour (2018)

The Don't Smile at Me Tour (stylized as dont smile at me tour) was the first headlining concert tour by American singer-songwriter Billie Eilish. It was launched in support of her debut EP Don't Smile at Me (2017), and consisted of 17 concerts, 12 in North America and 5 in Europe. The North America dates were announced in July 2017, with more dates being added later. The set list featured all of the songs from Don't Smile at Me. The tour was positively received by critics.

== Synopsis ==
Eilish would start the tour with "Copycat" over flickering lights. They would slow the show and play "Idontwannabeyouanymore". "Watch" would then come next. She would then perform "Party Favor" while playing on a ukulele and would later transition into a cover of the Drake song "Hotline Bling". She would later perform an unreleased song called "Listen Before I Go". Eilish ended her regular set with "Ocean Eyes". Eilish would return with a performance of "Bellyache" during the encore.

== Set list ==
This set list is representative of the show in Philadelphia, Pennsylvania on October 20, 2017. It is not representative of all concerts for the duration of the tour.

1. "Copycat"
2. "Idontwannabeyouanymore"
3. "Watch"
4. "Six Feet Under"
5. "Hotline Bling"
6. "Party Favor"
7. "I’m in Love Without You"
8. "listen before i go"
9. "Ocean Eyes"
10. "Wish You Were Gay"
11. "Bellyache"

== Shows ==
List of concerts, showing date, city, country, and venue
Date (2017)	City	Country	Venue
North America
October 4	Santa Ana	United States	Constellation Room
October 5	Los Angeles	United States	The Echo
October 7	San Francisco	United States	Rickshaw Stop
October 9	Portland	United States	Holocene
October 10	Seattle	United States	The Crocodile Back Bar
October 12	Chicago	United States	Schubas Tavern
October 14	Toronto	Canada	Drake Hotel
October 16	Brooklyn	United States	Baby’s All Right
October 17	New York	United States	Public Arts at the Public Hotel
October 19	Cambridge	United States	Sonia
October 20	Philadelphia	United States	World Café Live
October 21	Washington, D.C.	United States	Rock & Roll Hotel
Europe
October 26	Paris	France	Le Carmen
October 27	Amsterdam	Netherlands	Melkweg Upstairs
October 29	Stockholm	Sweden	Obaren
November 1	Berlin	Germany	Badehaus
November 2	London	England	O2 Academy Islington
