= Fingers Crossed (disambiguation) =

Crossed fingers is a hand gesture commonly used to wish for luck.

Fingers Crossed may also refer to:

- Fingers Crossed (album), by Architecture in Helsinki, 2003
- "Fingers Crossed" (Agnes song), 2020
- "Fingers Crossed" (Lauren Spencer-Smith song), 2022
- Fingers Crossed, a 2016 album by Ian Hunter and the Rant Band
- "Fingers Crossed", a 2015 song by Billie Eilish
- "Fingers Crossed", a 2021 song by Trevor Daniel and Julia Michaels
