= Party Favor (song) =

2018 single by Billie Eilish

Promotional single by Billie Eilish

from the EP Don't Smile at Me
- B-side: "Hotline Bling" (Drake cover)
- Released: April 21, 2018
- Genre: Folk
- Length: 3:24
- Label: Darkroom; Interscope
- Songwriters: Billie Eilish; Finneas O'Connell
- Producer: Finneas O'Connell

"Party Favor" is a song by American singer Billie Eilish from her debut studio EP, Don't Smile at Me (2017). The song was released by Darkroom and Interscope Records on a 7-inch vinyl as a promotional single from the EP on Record Store Day, along with a cover of "Hotline Bling". It was written by Eilish and her brother Finneas O'Connell, with the latter solely handling the song's production.

Musically a folk track, the lyrics of "Party Favor" address Eilish breaking up with her boyfriend. The song was ultimately certified gold in the United States and Canada by the Recording Industry Association of America (RIAA) and Music Canada (MC), respectively. It was performed live by Eilish during her 2019 When We All Fall Asleep Tour.

== Background and composition ==
"Party Favor" was released on a pink 7-inch vinyl as a promotional single from Don't Smile at Me on April 21, 2018, coinciding with Record Store Day for that year, along with a cover of "Hotline Bling", written by Canadian rapper Drake, as the B-side, by Darkroom and Interscope Records. The song title was also stylized in all lowercase. The cover version was later released for digital download and streaming in June 2018 by the aforementioned labels. "Party Favor" was written by Eilish and Finneas O'Connell, her brother and the track's sole producer and mixer.

Kirsten Spruch of Billboard described the track's genre as "quirky adjacent" folk. According to Musicnotes.com, "Party Favor" is played in the key of C major, while Eilish's vocals span a range of A_{3} to A_{4}. It is the only song on the EP that includes Eilish playing the ukulele. In the lyrics, the song starts with a phone ringing and someone saying, "Hey, leave a message." It then slowly formats to a voicemail with Eilish explaining that she is leaving a boy who has become too possessive over her, and trying everything to get him out of her life: "Look, now I know, we coulda done it better/But we can't change the weather/When the weather's come and gone/Books don't make sense if you read 'em backwards/You'll single out the wrong words/Like you mishear all my songs." Eilish warns her lover that she is done. Halfway through the song, Eilish then reveals that she's dumping her boyfriend on his birthday: "You just want what you can't have/No way/I'll call the cops/If you don't stop, I'll call your dad." Sam Moore of NME described the genre of Eilish's cover of "Hotline Bling" as "delicate indie pop" compared to the original version.

== Reception ==
Thomas Smith from NME said the song was "a far cry from her now-relentless and brooding productions, but still irresistibly catchy." Insider's Claudia Willen called it "a creative and brutal portrayal of just how ruthless breakups can be," though stated that "the song doesn't beg to be listened to on loop as some of Eilish's other breakup songs do, like 'Watch' and 'Bitches Broken Hearts'. Spruch commented that "Party Favor" can "be easily overlooked when standing next to early hits 'Bellyache' and 'Ocean Eyes'," but that it "still has a whole lot of that Eilish persona." Commercially, the track has been certified gold in the United States and Canada by the Recording Industry Association of America (RIAA) and Music Canada (MC), respectively.

== Live performances ==
In November 2017, Eilish and Finneas performed an acoustic version of "Party Favor" for Mahogany. The song was also performed live during Eilish's North American 1 by 1 tour in 2018. The track was included on the setlist of her When We All Fall Asleep Tour (2019).

== Track listing ==
7-inch vinyl

A. "Party Favor"
B. "Hotline Bling" (Drake cover)

== Credits and personnel ==
Credits adapted from the liner notes of Don't Smile at Me.

- Billie Eilish – vocals, songwriter, ukulele
- Finneas O'Connell – producer, songwriter, mixer
- John Greenham – mastering engineer

== Certifications ==
Certifications for "Party Favor"
Region	Certification	Certified units/sales
Australia (ARIA)	Platinum	70,000^{‡}
Brazil (Pro-Música Brasil)	Gold	20,000^{‡}
Canada (Music Canada)	Platinum	80,000^{‡}
New Zealand (RMNZ)	Gold	15,000^{‡}
United Kingdom (BPI)	Silver	200,000^{‡}
United States (RIAA)	Gold	500,000^{‡}
^{‡} Sales+streaming figures based on certification alone.
