= Hostage (Billie Eilish song) =

2017 song by Billie Eilish

Song by Billie Eilish

from the EP Don't Smile at Me
- Released: August 11, 2017
- Genre: Pop
- Length: 3:48
- Label: Darkroom; Interscope
- Songwriters: Billie Eilish O'Connell; Finneas O'Connell
- Producer: Finneas

Music video
- "Hostage" on YouTube

"Hostage" is a song by American singer Billie Eilish from her debut EP, Don't Smile at Me (2017). The singer and her brother Finneas O'Connell co-wrote the song, while the latter solely handled production. The song is a stripped-down pop track. Lyrically, it is about the intense love and an overwhelming desire to possess that Eilish feels for her romantic partner.

Upon its release, "Hostage" received positive reviews from music critics, with many liking the lyrics and music. An accompanying music video was released on July 11, 2018, and directed by Henry Scholfield. It takes place in an all-white room, with Eilish and her lover dancing, while wearing all white. The song was certified platinum by the Recording Industry Association of America (RIAA) and Music Canada (MC) in the United States and Canada, respectively. It was performed live by Eilish during her 2019 When We All Fall Asleep Tour.

== Background and composition ==
"Hostage" was included as the eighth and final track on Eilish's debut EP Don't Smile at Me, released on August 11, 2017. The song was written by Eilish and her brother Finneas O'Connell, known under his stage name of Finneas. He was also solely responsible for the song's engineering and production. Mixing was done at The Fortress of Amplitude by Rob Kinelski and mastering was handled by John Greenham. According to the sheet music published at Musicnotes.com, "Hostage" is composed in the key of A minor and has a slow tempo of 65 beats per minute (BPM). Eilish's vocals span a range from E_{4} to G_{5}. Musically, "Hostage" was described as a stripped-down pop track. Lyrically, it begins with Eilish being in a happy relationship: "I wanna be alone. Alone with you, does that make sense?" she harmonizes with Finneas. Then, in the same melancholy tone, she turns possessive towards her lover, and wants them for herself.

== Reception and promotion ==
Writing for Atwood Magazine, Nicole Almeida described the song as "one of the EP's most stripped back moments", and said that it "balances tenderness and affection with lyrics that display an obsessiveness that borders on dangerous". She further compared the song to the "eeriness" of "Bellyache", and the "vulnerability" of "Idontwannabeyouanymore", both of which are from Don't Smile at Me. Katherine Cusumano, writing for W magazine, said the track "strikes [a] balance between human relatability and a bit of a psychotic edge". NME ranked "Hostage" at number 21 on their 'Every single Billie Eilish song ranked in order of greatness' list. The staff hailed the song as "gradually intensifying" and said it was "raw with emotion and dark sentiment". Insider's Claudia Willen noted that it "artfully exposes a battle between complete adoration and problematic obsession". She continued, writing that the song shows Eilish's "willingness to be vulnerable in her music". Jules LeFevre, writing for Junkee magazine, placed the song at number 20 on her Every Billie Eilish Song Ranked From Worst To Best list, saying it was "another cloud".

"Hostage" has been certified platinum in the United States and Canada by the Recording Industry Association of America (RIAA) and Music Canada (MC), respectively. Eilish performed "Hostage" live during her North American 1 by 1 tour in 2018. The track was included on the setlist of Eilish's When We All Fall Asleep Tour (2019).

== Music video ==
=== Background ===
A music video for "Hostage" was produced by Henry Scholfield. It was first released exclusively via Apple Music on July 11, 2018. The video was later uploaded to YouTube on October 8, 2018. It was a collaboration between Scholfield, Belgian musician Stromae, Luc Junior Tam, and Eilish. Eilish asked Scholfield, Stromae and Tam to create a room with equal parts that would feel intimate and suffocating. Eilish explained in a statement that it took a while for them to shoot the visual, as a result of issues with schedules and trouble choosing a location to shoot the video. Eilish explained they were originally going to shoot it in Brussels, where Eilish was touring and where Stromae lived. They eventually figured out a plan that involved Stromae and Tam coming up with the idea, while Scholfield would be the director. The group had to rehearse and shoot in different cities during Eilish's tour, with them rehearsing the choreography in Philadelphia before Eilish would go on show with Peacock. A few days later, the group shot the music video in Toronto. Eilish concluded by saying, "at that point, we had cast Devyck in the video and he was just so amazing. We also had a team of amazing dancers working behind the scenes as well as all of the incredible crew and production staff."

=== Synopsis and reception ===
The music video is set in an all white room, amplifying the empty isolation the characters are stuck in. The visual starts with a choreographed dance between Eilish and her lover, who are both dressed in all white. Her lover is eventually attacked by ghostly extensions of the clothed wall and ceiling. As Eilish turns to her lover, the walls reach out and pull him in all directions. He starts to suffocate beneath the fabric while he is getting pulled up.

Writing for Complex magazine, Graham Corrigan praised the choreography of the video, saying that "[Eilish] proves she's just as skilled a partner on the dancefloor". Noah Levine, writing for Bloody Disgusting, wrote that the video "conveys strong asylum/hospital vibes", while he stated that Eilish and her lover look as "if they are both wearing modifications of a hospital gown". The music video received a nomination for Best Cinematography at the 2019 MTV Video Music Awards.

== Credits and personnel ==
Credits adapted from the liner notes of Don't Smile at Me.

- Billie Eilish – vocals, songwriter
- Finneas O'Connell – producer, songwriter, engineer
- Rob Kinelski – mixer
- John Greenham – mastering engineer

== Charts ==
Chart (2018)	Peak position
LyricFind Global (Billboard)	9

== Certifications ==
Certifications and sales for "Hostage"
Region	Certification	Certified units/sales
Australia (ARIA)	2× Platinum	140,000^{‡}
Austria (IFPI Austria)	Gold	15,000^{‡}
Brazil (Pro-Música Brasil)	Platinum	60,000^{‡}
Canada (Music Canada)	2× Platinum	160,000^{‡}
Denmark (IFPI Danmark)	Gold	45,000^{‡}
France (SNEP)	Gold	100,000^{‡}
New Zealand (RMNZ)	Platinum	30,000^{‡}
Poland (ZPAV)	Gold	10,000^{‡}
Portugal (AFP)	Gold	5,000^{‡}
United Kingdom (BPI)	Gold	400,000^{‡}
United States (RIAA)	Platinum	1,000,000^{‡}
^{‡} Sales+streaming figures based on certification alone.
