= Don't Smile at Me =

2017 EP by Billie Eilish

EP by Billie Eilish
- Released: August 11, 2017
- Recorded: 2015–2017
- Genres: Bedroom pop; electropop
- Length: 25:57
- Labels: Darkroom; Interscope
- Producer: Finneas O'Connell

Billie Eilish chronology
Don't Smile at Me (2017)	When We All Fall Asleep, Where Do We Go? (2019)

Singles from Don't Smile at Me
- 1. "Ocean Eyes" Released: November 18, 2016; 2. "Bellyache" Released: February 24, 2017; 3. "Watch" Released: June 30, 2017; 4. "Copycat" Released: July 13, 2017; 5. "Idontwannabeyouanymore" Released: July 21, 2017; 6. "My Boy" Released: July 27, 2017

Singles from Don't Smile at Me (reissue)
- 1. "&Burn" Released: December 15, 2017

Don't Smile at Me (stylized in all lowercase) is the debut extended play by American singer-songwriter Billie Eilish, released on August 11, 2017, via Darkroom and Interscope Records. Eilish and her brother Finneas O'Connell wrote all the material on the EP's original release, with Finneas solely responsible for its production. It is a bedroom pop and electropop record with elements of R&B and jazz.

Six singles were released to support Don't Smile at Me. "Ocean Eyes" and "Idontwannabeyouanymore" were both sleeper hits, charting on the US Billboard Hot 100 and UK Singles Chart. "Bellyache" reached the top five on the Billboard Bubbling Under Hot 100 chart for a milestone of 32 weeks, while "Copycat" peaked at number 12 on the chart. Eilish embarked on the Don't Smile at Me Tour and Where's My Mind Tour in 2017 and 2018, respectively, to further promote the EP.

The EP received generally favorable reviews from music critics, with many praising the music and Eilish's vocals. "Hostage" received a nomination for Best Cinematography at the 2019 MTV Video Music Awards. Don't Smile at Me was commercially successful, reaching number 14 on the US Billboard 200 and number 12 on the UK Albums Chart. It entered the top 10 in many other countries, including Lithuania, where it reached number one.

The EP has been reissued twice, with the first adding the single "&Burn" with Vince Staples on December 22, 2017; the song was certified gold in the United States by the Recording Industry Association of America (RIAA). Another reissue includes two more previously released singles, "Lovely" with Khalid and "Bitches Broken Hearts". "Lovely" was commercially successful, peaking at number 64 on the Billboard Hot 100 and number 47 on the UK Singles Chart. "Bitches Broken Hearts" was certified platinum in the US and Canada by the RIAA and Music Canada (MC), respectively.

== Background ==
In July 2017, Eilish told Billboard that "each track off dont smile at me will follow a distinct plot". She explained, "The only tie-together? I'm pretty sure I don't have any songs that are about how much I love someone. They're all either about like, 'I hate you,' or 'you make me hate me'."'

Eilish spoke about the EP's title: "My EP is called dont smile at me for a lot of reasons, but one of them would be when [someone tells you], 'Smile. Why aren't you smiling? It's so much more beautiful when you smile.' Everyone's taught to smile. Girls are like, 'Look happy, look like you're having fun!' I'm not gonna look like anybody except what I am. I want to impress myself." Eilish and her brother Finneas O'Connell wrote most of the material for Don't Smile at Me, with Finneas producing the EP in its entirety. Studio personnel John Greenham and Rob Kinelski handled the mastering and mixing, respectively.

== Music and lyrics ==
Don't Smile at Me is primarily a bedroom pop and electropop record with R&B and jazz influences. The EP opens with "Copycat", a hip-hop-influenced electronica and pop track. It features minimalist production consisting of a bass guitar and piano. The song is Eilish's response to people she felt kept copying everything she was doing. The following track, "Idontwannabeyouanymore", is a pop and R&B song, with a jazz and neo soul-influenced melody. The track features Eilish singing about self-doubt and low self-esteem. According to Baeble Music's Olivia Lewis, "My Boy" begins with a "chiller, jazz-like vibe, and a layer of darkness and mystery". It features hip hop-influenced production, using a hi-hat and keyboard. Musically, the track is a pop song.

With "Watch", described as a pop ballad, Eilish sends a message to her former lover, saying she is leaving their toxic relationship. The track begins with the sound of a match strike that continues throughout the song as its main beat. "Party Favor" is a folk track with Eilish playing the ukulele. The song addresses Eilish's break up with her boyfriend on his birthday with a phone call. "Bellyache" is a mid-tempo electropop and R&B song with influences of hip hop, deep house and Latin macabre in its instrumentation. The song's lyrics were written from the perspective of a psychopath who kills those close to her, including her friends and lover.

"Ocean Eyes" is a dream pop, pop, synth-pop, indie pop and R&B ballad. The song features percussion, bass guitar and a synthesizer. "Ocean Eyes" is a love letter to Eilish's crush with her lover's "ocean" eyes. Don't Smile at Me closes with "Hostage", a stripped-down pop track. Lyrically, the track is about an intense love that Eilish feels for someone and an overwhelming desire she has for them. The reissue of the EP contains one additional track; "&Burn" with Vince Staples—a hip hop-influenced pop track. "[B]ooming kick drums" and "velvety keys" support the track. Like "Watch", the song starts with the sound of a match striking and uses it for the main beat. When Eilish and Finneas were recording the song, it was titled "Watch & Burn". The track later became two separate songs—"Watch" and "&Burn".

The expanded edition of Don't Smile at Me contains two extra tracks. "Lovely", featuring Khalid, is a chamber pop-based stripped back ballad. The track features minimalist production consisting of a piano, violin strings provided by Madison Leinster, and percussion, as Eilish and Khalid sing about the feeling of being trapped inside of one's own mind. "Bitches Broken Hearts" is an R&B track. Emmit Fenn handled additional production of the track, the first song by Eilish to feature production by someone other than her brother. Lyrically, the song delves into the aftermath of a breakup, with Eilish pretending she no longer needs or cares about her former lover.

== Promotion ==
=== Singles and other songs ===
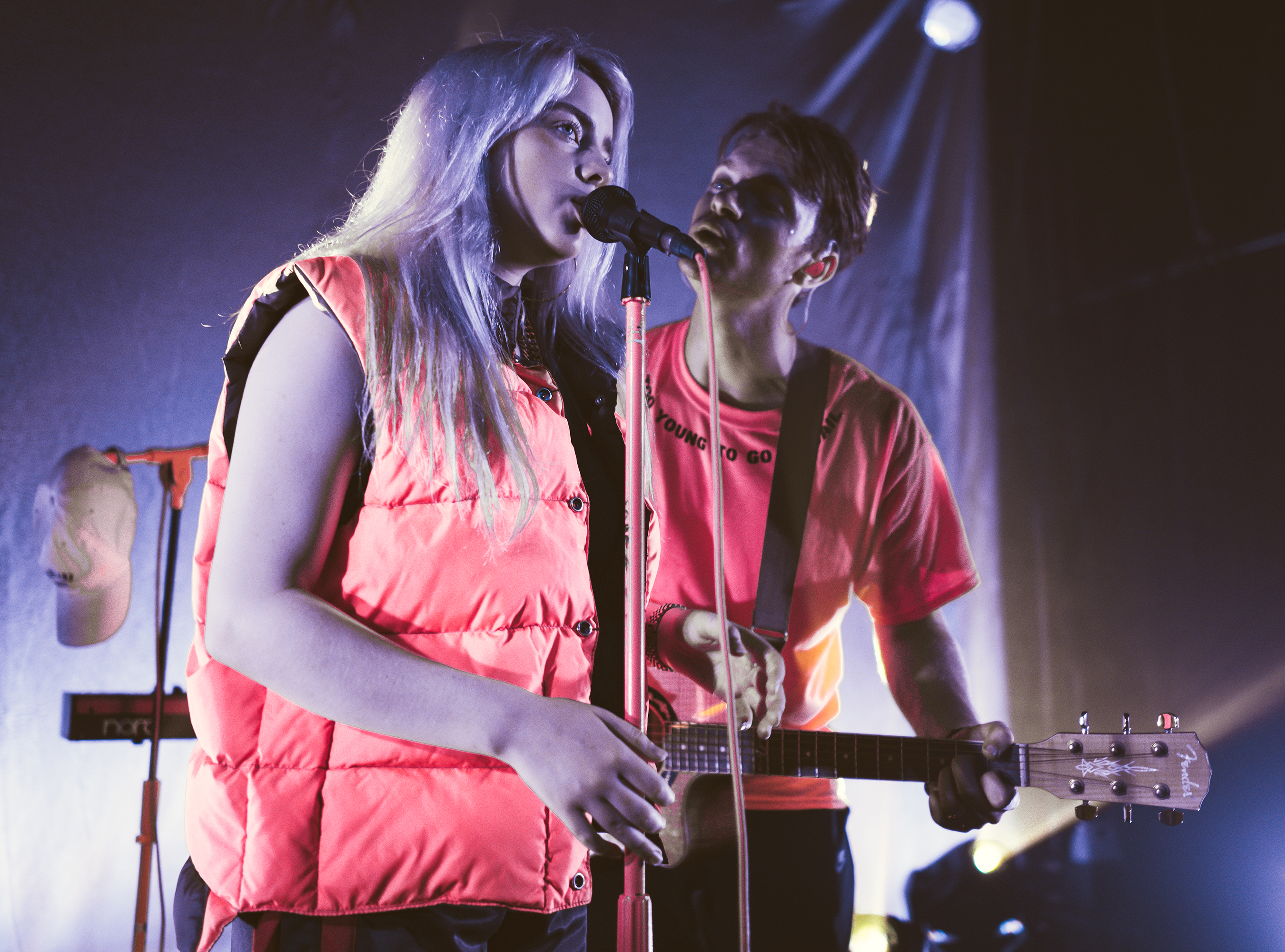
Billie Eilish performing with her brother Finneas in 2017

"Ocean Eyes" was originally released on November 18, 2015, via SoundCloud and YouTube. On November 18, 2016, it was re-released as the lead single from Don't Smile at Me. Although the song did not chart initially, it became a sleeper hit in 2019 after Eilish released her debut studio album When We All Fall Asleep, Where Do We Go?, reaching number 72 on the UK Singles Chart and number 84 on the US Billboard Hot 100. The Australian Recording Industry Association (ARIA) certified the song quadruple platinum in Australia. It received triple platinum certifications in the United States, Canada and Denmark from the Recording Industry Association of America (RIAA), Music Canada (MC) and IFPI Denmark, respectively. The song spawned two music videos; Megan Thompson directed the first released on March 24, 2016. The second is a dance performance video released on November 22, 2016. A remix EP for the track was released on January 14, 2017. It includes remixes by Astronomyy, Blackbear, Goldhouse, and Cautious Clay.

"Bellyache" was released on February 24, 2017, as the second single from Don't Smile at Me. The song was also a sleeper hit, reaching number three on the US Bubbling Under Hot 100 chart for a milestone of 32 weeks, and number 79 on the UK Singles Chart. It was certified double platinum in the US, Australia, and in Mexico by the Asociación Mexicana de Productores de Fonogramas y Videogramas (AMPROFON). Miles and AJ directed an accompanying music video released on March 22, 2017. Marian Hill remixed "Bellyache" and released it on May 5, 2017. "Watch" was released as the third single from Don't Smile at Me on June 30, 2017. Megan Park directed the song's music video which was released on September 18, 2017. The track was certified platinum in the US, Canada, and Australia. "Copycat" was released as the EP's fourth single on July 14, 2017. Sofi Tukker remixed it and released it on January 12, 2018. The song peaked at number 12 on the Bubbling Under Hot 100 chart; it ultimately was certified in the US.

"Idontwannabeyouanymore" was released as the fifth single from Don't Smile at Me on July 21, 2017. It charted at number 96 on the Billboard Hot 100 and number 78 on the UK Singles Chart. The track was certified double platinum in the US. A vertical video for the track was released to Spotify in December 2017. The EP's sixth single, "My Boy", was released on July 28, 2017. The song received a remix by TroyBoi entitled "MyBoi", released on March 9, 2018. "My Boy" was certified platinum in the US. "&Burn", featuring American rapper Vince Staples, was released as a single on December 15, 2017 and later included on the EP's reissue. The song was certified gold in the US. "Party Favor" was released on an exclusive pink 7-inch vinyl as a promotional single on April 21, 2018, coinciding with that year's Record Store Day. A cover of "Hotline Bling", originally performed and written by Canadian rapper Drake, was released as the B-side. "Party Favor" was certified gold in the US.

"Lovely", featuring Khalid, was released as the lead single for 13 Reasons Why: Season 2 (Music from the Original TV Series) on April 19, 2018, and later included on the expanded edition of the EP. Taylor Cohen and Matty Peacock directed its music video. The song reached number 64 on the Billboard Hot 100 and number 47 on the UK Singles Chart. It was certified octuple platinum in Australia and Canada, triple platinum in Mexico and in Poland (certified by the Polish Society of the Phonographic Industry (PSPI)), and double platinum in the US and New Zealand—certified by Recorded Music NZ (RMNZ). "Bitches Broken Hearts" was originally released as a standalone single on March 30, 2018. It was later included on the expanded edition of Don't Smile at Me and the physical deluxe edition of Eilish's debut studio album When We All Fall Asleep, Where Do We Go?. The song was certified platinum in the US and Canada. Despite not being released as a single, Henry Scholfield produced a music video for "Hostage". It was initially released exclusively via Apple Music on July 11, 2018. The video was later uploaded to Eilish's YouTube channel on October 8, 2018. "Hostage" was ultimately certified platinum in the US and Canada.

=== Tours ===
To promote the EP, Eilish embarked on the Don't Smile at Me Tour and Where's My Mind Tour during 2017 and 2018. In Europe, Eilish would open with "Bellyache". Eilish would then sing "&Burn" without Staples. It would begin with the original arrangement before the beat drops and Eilish would break into dance. Eilish would finish with "Copycat", red lights would flash as she sang it. The staff of Billboard magazine praised Eilish's performance at The Bowery Ballroom. Lyndsay Havens described the performance as "explosive" but "at times tender, and entirely exciting". She added the performance was "the type of show where you are acutely aware that the artist you are currently watching will outgrow the venue they are playing almost immediately". The staff of The Gazette felt Eilish "wants to bring the audience into her world, creating an experience for them".

== Reception ==
Professional ratings
Review scores
Source	Rating
AllMusic	3.5/5 stars
Tom Hull – on the Web	B+
Vice (Expert Witness)	B+

Don't Smile at Me became a sleeper hit in the US, debuting at number 185 on the US Billboard 200 a month and a half after its release. The EP later broke into the top 100 in the week ending May 31, 2018, its 21st week on the chart, at number 97 with 7,000 album-equivalent units. Don't Smile at Me reached the top 40 of the Billboard 200 in the week ending July 28 at number 38 with 12,000 units, including 10,000 streaming equivalent album units, before peaking at number 14 in its 56th charting week for the issue dated January 26, 2019. As of April 2019, the EP has sold 947,000 album-equivalent units in the US and has also generated more than 1.2 billion on-demand audio streams for its tracks. Don't Smile at Me was more successful outside the United States. The EP peaked at number 12 on the UK Albums Chart. In Australia, it peaked at number six on the ARIA Charts. It was most successful in Lithuania, peaking at number one on the chart. In early 2019, Eilish became the youngest artist to hit one billion streams on Spotify with Don't Smile at Me.

Don't Smile at Me was met with generally favorable reviews by music critics. Kristin Smith of Plugged In said of the EP, "A fusion of multiple genres, sounds and styles, these nine tracks capture the young singer's undeniably engaging perspective and personality. We hear the honest confessions of a teenager who has known heartbreak, self-loathing and love. Don't Smile at Me is dreamy and depressing, enchanting and haunting. And it warrants both praise and caution." Nicole Almeida of Atwood Magazine wrote Don't Smile at Me was a "powerful declaration", and a "statement coming from the mouth of someone who knows who she is. The title perfectly embodies the strength and ambition of Eilish's debut EP and of Eilish herself as an artist." Robert Christgau, writing for Vice, commended Eilish's "still-fragile melodies and still-pure voice" on the EP, but considered the songwriting and production to be less accomplished than that of her debut single When We All Fall Asleep, Where Do We Go?. Tom Hull mentioned that Don't Smile at Me's singles are "more pop", and more "easily distinguished from the filler". Brenton Blanchet of Spin magazine lauded the EP, saying it was the "first sample of what Eilish could create in her bedroom", saying the "airy and atmospheric project showcased pop craft beyond her age".

All Time listings for Don't Smile at Me
Publication	List	Rank	Ref.
Paste	The 100 Greatest EPs of All Time	79	

== Track listing ==
All tracks are written by Billie Eilish O'Connell and Finneas O'Connell, except where noted. All tracks are produced solely by F. O'Connell, except where noted.

Standard edition
No.	Title	Writer(s)	Length
1.	"Copycat"		3:13
2.	"Idontwannabeyouanymore"		3:23
3.	"My Boy"		2:50
4.	"Watch"	F. O'Connell	2:58
5.	"Party Favor"		3:25
6.	"Bellyache"		3:00
7.	"Ocean Eyes"	F. O'Connell	3:20
8.	"Hostage"		3:48
Total length:			25:57

Reissue edition bonus track
No.	Title	Writer(s)	Length
9.	"&Burn" (with Vince Staples)	F. O'Connell; Vincent Staples	2:59
Total length:			28:56

UK and Ireland digital expanded edition bonus tracks
No.	Title	Writer(s)	Length
10.	"Lovely" (with Khalid)	B. O'Connell; F. O'Connell; Khalid Robinson	3:20
11.	"Bitches Broken Hearts" (producers: F. O'Connell, Fenn)	B. O'Connell; F. O'Connell; Emmit Fenn	2:56
Total length:			35:12

Japanese CD edition bonus tracks
No.	Title	Length
12.	"Bellyache" (Marian Hill remix)	3:41
13.	"Copycat" (Sofi Tukker remix)	3:19
14.	"MyBoi" (TroyBoi remix)	3:31
Total length:		45:43

Japanese complete edition bonus DVD
No.	Title	Director(s)	Length
1.	"Idontwannabeyouanymore" (music video)	Eli Born	3:23
2.	"Watch" (music video)	Megan Park	3:19
3.	"Bellyache" (music video)	Miles and AJ	3:31
4.	"Hostage" (music video)	Henry Scholfield	3:53
5.	"Lovely" (with Khalid) (music video)	Taylor Cohen; Matty Peacock	3:19
Total length:			17:25

Notes

- All tracks are stylized in all lowercase, except for "Copycat", which is stylized in all caps, and "MyBoi".
- "&Burn" is an alternate version of "Watch".

== Personnel ==
Credits adapted from the album's liner notes.

- Billie Eilish – vocals, songwriter, ukulele
- Finneas – production, engineering, songwriter, mixing (tracks 5, 7)
- John Greenham – mastering
- Rob Kinelski – mixing (all tracks except 5, 7)

== Charts ==
=== Weekly charts ===
Chart performance for Don't Smile at Me
Chart (2017–2026)	Peak position
Australian Albums (ARIA)	6
Austrian Albums (Ö3 Austria)	23
Belgian Albums (Ultratop Flanders)	10
Belgian Albums (Ultratop Wallonia)	44
Canadian Albums (Billboard)	10
Czech Albums (ČNS IFPI)	9
Danish Albums (Hitlisten)	11
Dutch Albums (Album Top 100)	10
Finnish Albums (Suomen virallinen lista)	4
French Albums (SNEP)	91
German Albums (Offizielle Top 100)	20
German Pop Albums (Offizielle Top 100)	12
Greek Albums (IFPI)	32
Hungarian Albums (MAHASZ)	35
Icelandic Albums (Tónlistinn)	9
Irish Albums (IRMA)	4
Italian Albums (FIMI)	61
Latvian Albums (LAIPA)	9
Lithuanian Albums (AGATA)	1
Mexican Albums (Top 100 Mexico)	14
New Zealand Albums (RMNZ)	3
Norwegian Albums (VG-lista)	6
Polish Albums (ZPAV)	17
Portuguese Albums (AFP)	13
Scottish Albums (Official Charts)	51
Slovak Albums (ČNS IFPI)	9
Spanish Albums (Promusicae)	12
Swedish Albums (Sverigetopplistan)	4
Swiss Albums (Schweizer Hitparade)	25
UK Albums (Official Charts)	12
US Billboard 200	14
US Top Alternative Albums (Billboard)	1

=== Year-end charts ===
2018 year-end chart performances for Don't Smile at Me
Chart (2018)	Position
Australian Albums (ARIA)	94
Belgian Albums (Ultratop Flanders)	124
Estonian Albums (Eesti Tipp-100)	16
Icelandic Albums (Tónlistinn)	39
New Zealand Albums (RMNZ)	18
Swedish Albums (Sverigetopplistan)	51
UK Albums (OCC)	82
US Billboard 200	92
US Top Alternative Albums (Billboard)	15

2019 year-end chart performances for Don't Smile at Me
Chart (2019)	Position
Australian Albums (ARIA)	17
Austrian Albums (Ö3 Austria)	47
Belgian Albums (Ultratop Flanders)	20
Belgian Albums (Ultratop Wallonia)	130
Canadian Albums (Billboard)	15
Danish Albums (Hitlisten)	32
Dutch Albums (Album Top 100)	18
French Albums (SNEP)	173
Icelandic Albums (Tónlistinn)	12
Irish Albums (IRMA)	13
Mexican Albums (Top 100 Mexico)	79
New Zealand Albums (RMNZ)	11
Norwegian Albums (VG-lista)	12
Swedish Albums (Sverigetopplistan)	13
UK Albums (OCC)	18
US Billboard 200	16
US Top Alternative Albums (Billboard)	2

2020 year-end chart performances for Don't Smile at Me
Chart (2020)	Position
Australian Albums (ARIA)	37
Belgian Albums (Ultratop Flanders)	32
Belgian Albums (Ultratop Wallonia)	89
Canadian Albums (Billboard)	38
Danish Albums (Hitlisten)	66
Dutch Albums (Album Top 100)	39
Icelandic Albums (Tónlistinn)	33
Irish Albums (IRMA)	24
New Zealand Albums (RMNZ)	28
Norwegian Albums (VG-lista)	32
Swedish Albums (Sverigetopplistan)	33
UK Albums (OCC)	30
US Billboard 200	42
US Top Alternative Albums (Billboard)	3

2021 year-end chart performances for Don't Smile at Me
Chart (2021)	Position
Australian Albums (ARIA)	67
Belgian Albums (Ultratop Flanders)	93
Belgian Albums (Ultratop Wallonia)	173
Icelandic Albums (Tónlistinn)	76
Swedish Albums (Sverigetopplistan)	90
UK Albums (OCC)	73
US Billboard 200	70
US Top Alternative Albums (Billboard)	6

2022 year-end chart performances for Don't Smile at Me
Chart (2022)	Position
Australian Albums (ARIA)	62
Lithuanian Albums (AGATA)	54
New Zealand Albums (RMNZ)	38
UK Albums (OCC)	84
US Billboard 200	152
US Top Alternative Albums (Billboard)	17

2023 year-end chart performances for Don't Smile at Me
Chart (2023)	Position
Australian Albums (ARIA)	72
UK Albums (OCC)	95

2024 year-end chart performances for Don't Smile at Me
Chart (2024)	Position
Australian Albums (ARIA)	96
Portuguese Albums (AFP)	61
Swedish Albums (Sverigetopplistan)	94

2025 year-end chart performances for Don't Smile at Me
Chart (2025)	Position
Belgian Albums (Ultratop Flanders)	174
Polish Albums (ZPAV)	91
Swedish Albums (Sverigetopplistan)	92

=== Decade-end charts ===
Decade-end chart performance for Don't Smile at Me
Chart (2010–2019)	Position
US Billboard 200	198

== Certifications ==
Certifications and sales for Don't Smile at Me
Region	Certification	Certified units/sales
Australia (ARIA)	3× Platinum	210,000^{‡}
Austria (IFPI Austria)	Platinum	15,000^{‡}
Canada (Music Canada)	4× Platinum	320,000^{‡}
Denmark (IFPI Danmark)	3× Platinum	60,000^{‡}
France (SNEP)	3× Platinum	300,000^{‡}
Germany (BVMI)	Gold	100,000^{‡}
Hungary (MAHASZ)	Platinum	2,000^{‡}
Iceland (FHF)	—	3,655
Italy (FIMI)	Platinum	50,000^{‡}
Mexico (AMPROFON)	2× Diamond+Platinum+Gold	690,000^{‡}
New Zealand (RMNZ)	5× Platinum	75,000^{‡}
Poland (ZPAV)	Diamond	100,000^{‡}
Portugal (AFP)	Platinum	15,000^{^}
Singapore (RIAS)	Platinum	10,000^{*}
United Kingdom (BPI)	2× Platinum	600,000^{‡}
United States (RIAA)	Platinum	1,000,000^{‡}
^{*} Sales figures based on certification alone.^{^} Shipments figures based on certification alone.^{‡} Sales+streaming figures based on certification alone.

== See also ==
- List of albums which have spent the most weeks on the UK Albums Chart
- List of best-selling albums in Mexico
