= You Should See Me in a Crown =

2018 single by Billie Eilish

Single by Billie Eilish

from the album When We All Fall Asleep, Where Do We Go?
- B-side: "Bitches Broken Hearts"
- Released: July 18, 2018
- Recorded: February 2018
- Genre: Electropop; trap
- Length: 3:00
- Label: Darkroom; Interscope
- Songwriters: Billie Eilish; Finneas O'Connell; Benoit Louis Andre Roger Bardou
- Producer: Finneas O'Connell

Billie Eilish singles chronology
"Lovely" (2018)	"You Should See Me in a Crown" (2018)	"When the Party's Over" (2018)

Music video
- "You Should See Me in a Crown" on YouTube

Alternative cover
- Picture sleeve for the US 7-inch single, released in October 2018

"You Should See Me in a Crown" (stylised in lowercase) is a song by American singer-songwriter Billie Eilish and the lead single of her debut studio album, When We All Fall Asleep, Where Do We Go? (2019). It was released on July 18, 2018, through Darkroom and Interscope Records. It was written by Eilish and her brother Finneas O'Connell, who also produced the track. The song received positive reviews and was charted in countries including the US, Canada and Australia.

== Background and release ==
The song's title was inspired by a scene from the third episode of the second season of the BBC television series Sherlock titled "The Reichenbach Fall", where the villain Jim Moriarty says the line "Honey, you should see me in a crown". Eilish and O'Connell, who are fans of the series, thought that the line was "dope" and decided to write a song around the quote. The song "Human" by Iranian-Dutch singer Sevdaliza was also cited as one of the track's influences.

The song was released on a 7-inch vinyl, along with "Bitches Broken Hearts" as the B-side on October 20, 2018, and was sold exclusively during her 1 By 1 Tour.

== Composition and lyrics ==
"You Should See Me in a Crown" is an electropop and trap song featuring Eilish singing over "blaring synths and rapid-fire hi-hats" as well as "industrial throbs". The chorus utilizes a "thumping bass (that) slithers menacingly." Additionally, the song incorporates a recording of Eilish's father sharpening knives.

Critics have described Eilish's vocals as "whispered" and "mumbled". Lyrically, the song describes Eilish plotting for world dominance.

== Release and promotion ==
The track was premiered on Annie Mac's BBC Radio 1 show on July 18, 2018. Two days later, Eilish posted a video of a tarantula crawling out of her mouth on her social media accounts with the caption "u scared?" In October, she made her daytime television debut on The Ellen DeGeneres Show performing the song inside a glass box seated on a throne. The Ringer deemed the performance the ninth most awkward on the show in 2018. The song was used as the official theme song for the professional wrestling pay-per-view event NXT TakeOver: New York.

== Reception ==
The song was well received by music critics; many noted that it was significantly darker than Eilish's previous work. NME's Thomas Smith reacted positively towards the song, writing "she's not playing nice anymore. Kicking off with some mumbled vocals and a melody that sounds like the most sinister nursery rhyme you ever heard, Billie's sending for everyone." Raisa Bruner of Time featured the song on her "5 Songs You Need to Listen To" list on the week of July 20, 2018 and wrote "Eilish finds a vibe that's the right kind of eerie as she makes an unabashedly dark statement of confidence and purpose." Jacob Moore of Complex called the track "a gorgeously written song with a pop core and an unforgettable chorus, but dark undertones give it an dynamic edge."

Billboard named the single the 50th best song of 2018, and PopMatters gave it the same ranking.

== Music videos ==
=== Vertical video ===
A vertical music video for the track was released in August 2018 featuring Eilish covered in spiders as she sings the song. Eilish cited a woman called "Diana" as an inspiration for the video, saying of her: "She showed me how she puts the spider in her mouth, and then I did it. Spiders on my face and hair...I loved it." The vertical video was later released as a full-screen video, albeit with the same recording and audio.

=== Official video ===
In March 2019, Eilish released the official music video for the track, directed and animated by Takashi Murakami, with whom she had previously collaborated for the cover of Garage Magazine, on Apple Music, before posting it to YouTube the following month. Murakami stated in a press release that the anime-style video, which was animated using motion capture technology, took eight months for him to create. The video opens with an animated version of Eilish, dressed in a neon-green shirt and shorts. This modified Eilish tries on a black spider hoodie and eventually morphs into a spider-like monster that wreaks havoc on a miniature city. The video features the first appearance of the "Blohsh", Eilish's signature logo, as well as Murakami's flowers.

== Usage in media ==
"You Should See Me in a Crown" was used in a promotional ad for the boxing match between Deontay Wilder and Tyson Fury. It also features on FIFA 19 and FIFA 23. It was later featured in '03 Bonnie and Clyde, the fifth episode of the American series Euphoria as well as in the third season of Queen of the South. It also appears in the sixth episode of season one of the Amazon Prime series Hanna. It was featured in the seventh episode of the second season of the Marvel/Hulu series Runaways. It was also one of the official theme songs for NXT TakeOver: New York. It was also played at the end of the first episode of Emergence as well as at the end of the ninth episode of Netflix's Locke & Key. The song was also used in contortionist Marina Mazepa's quarterfinal performance on America's Got Talent in 2019. In This Moment singer Maria Brink performed a cover of the song. In 2022 it was featured in the second episode of the second season of Only Murders in the Building. It was also used in the Netflix movie The School for Good and Evil and is part of the soundtrack of Just Dance 2024 Edition. In 2024, it was used in the credits for episode 5 of Agatha All Along, in the ending and credits of episode 2 of the first season of Sweetpea, and featured in Episode 4 of the first season of A Good Girl's Guide to Murder.

== Credits and personnel ==
Credits adapted from Tidal and the 7-inch vinyl liner notes.

- Billie Eilish – vocals, songwriter
- Finneas O'Connell – producer, songwriter, engineer, bass, synthesizers, drum programming, arrangement, vocal sampling, knife sharpening recording
- Casey Cuayo – assistant mixer, studio personnel
- Rob Kinelski – mixer, studio personnel
- John Greenham – mastering engineer, studio personnel
- Benoit Louis Andre Roger Bardou – songwriter

== Charts ==
=== Weekly charts ===
Weekly chart performance for "You Should See Me in a Crown"
Chart (2018–2019)	Peak position
Australia (ARIA)	16
Belgium (Ultratip Bubbling Under Flanders)	19
Canada Hot 100 (Billboard)	27
Canada Rock (Billboard)	38
Czech Republic Singles Digital (ČNS IFPI)	21
Estonia (Eesti Tipp-40)	10
Germany (GfK)	79
Greece (IFPI)	17
Hungary (Stream Top 40)	21
Iceland (Tónlistinn)	31
Ireland (IRMA)	68
Italy (FIMI)	92
Latvia (LAIPA)	8
Lithuania (AGATA)	11
Netherlands (Single Top 100)	59
New Zealand Hot Singles (RMNZ)	3
Portugal (AFP)	42
Scottish Singles Sales (Official Charts)	68
Slovakia Singles Digital (ČNS IFPI)	14
Spain (PROMUSICAE)	85
Sweden (Sverigetopplistan)	43
UK Singles (Official Charts)	60
US Billboard Hot 100	41
US Rock & Alternative Airplay (Billboard)	13

=== Year-end charts ===
Year-end chart performance for "You Should See Me in a Crown"
Chart (2019)	Position
Portugal (AFP)	182

== Certifications ==
Certifications and sales for "You Should See Me in a Crown"
Region	Certification	Certified units/sales
Australia (ARIA)	4× Platinum	280,000^{‡}
Austria (IFPI Austria)	Platinum	30,000^{‡}
Brazil (Pro-Música Brasil)	Diamond	160,000^{‡}
Canada (Music Canada)	6× Platinum	480,000^{‡}
Denmark (IFPI Danmark)	Gold	45,000^{‡}
Germany (BVMI)	Gold	200,000^{‡}
Italy (FIMI)	Gold	25,000^{‡}
Mexico (AMPROFON)	Diamond+4× Platinum+Gold	570,000^{‡}
New Zealand (RMNZ)	2× Platinum	60,000^{‡}
Poland (ZPAV)	2× Platinum	40,000^{‡}
Portugal (AFP)	Platinum	10,000^{‡}
Spain (Promusicae)	Gold	30,000^{‡}
United Kingdom (BPI)	Platinum	600,000^{‡}
United States (RIAA)	2× Platinum	2,000,000^{‡}
^{‡} Sales+streaming figures based on certification alone.

== Release history ==
Release dates and formats for "You Should See Me in a Crown"
Country	Date	Format	Label	Ref.
Various	July 18, 2018	Digital download; streaming	Darkroom; Interscope	
United States	August 28, 2018	Alternative radio	Darkroom; Interscope	
Italy	September 7, 2018	Contemporary hit radio	Universal	
United States	October 20, 2018	7-inch vinyl	Darkroom; Interscope	
