= &Burn =

2017 single by Billie Eilish

Single by Billie Eilish and Vince Staples

from the EP Don't Smile at Me (reissue)
- Released: December 15, 2017
- Genre: Pop
- Length: 2:59
- Label: Darkroom; Interscope
- Songwriters: Finneas O'Connell; Vince Staples
- Producer: Finneas O'Connell

Billie Eilish singles chronology
"My Boy" (2017)	"&Burn" (2017)	"Bitches Broken Hearts" (2018)

Vince Staples singles chronology
"Rain Come Down" (2017)	"&Burn" (2017)	"Get the Fuck Off My Dick" (2018)

"&Burn" (pronounced "And Burn") is a song by American singer Billie Eilish and American rapper Vince Staples. It was released for digital download and streaming as a single on December 15, 2017, through Darkroom and Interscope Records. It was later included as the seventh single on a reissue of Eilish's debut EP, Don't Smile at Me, in December of that year. Staples and Finneas O'Connell co-wrote the song, with the latter solely handling production. A hip hop-influenced pop track, the song is an alternate version of Eilish's single "Watch".

The lyrics of the song address Eilish leaving a toxic relationship. "&Burn" received positive reviews from music critics, with many liking the lyrical content and production. The song has been certified gold in both the United States and Australia by the Recording Industry Association of America (RIAA) and the Australian Recording Industry Association (ARIA), respectively. It was performed live by Eilish and Staples at the Coachella Valley Music and Arts Festival in 2019.

== Background and release ==
In a statement made by Eilish to The Fader through email, she wrote, "Vince Staples was my number 1 choice, so when we got him to hear it and he agreed to do it, it was incredible and the verse he did is so good. He is a god and I'm excited for it to finally come out!" When Eilish and her brother Finneas O'Connell were recording the song, it was under the title of "Watch & Burn". The track later became two separate songs, with one being "Watch" (2017), and the other being "&Burn".

The track was written by Staples and O'Connell, the latter of which solely produced it. Mastering and mixing was handled by the studio personnel John Greenham and Rob Kinelski, respectively. "&Burn" was released as a single on December 15, 2017, for digital download and streaming in various countries, through Darkroom and Interscope Records. The song was later included on a reissue of Eilish's debut EP Don't Smile at Me.

== Composition and lyrical interpretation ==
Critical commentary described "&Burn" as a "hip hop-influenced pop track". David Renshaw from The Fader described "&Burn" as a "moody slow-burner packed with booming drums and hushed verses". Wandera Hussein of Billboard stated the track is supported by "booming kick drums" and "velvety keys". She further mentioned that Eilish's vocals are "poignant, baby-soft, [and] express a fiery revenge". Staples provides background vocals on the song and his appearance has been described as a "deep and gloomy verse". The song starts with the strike of a match, which continues throughout as the main beat.

== Reception and promotion ==
"&Burn" was met with generally favorable reviews from music critics. Insider's Callie Ahlgrim commented that "Watch" feels more "vulnerable" and "nostalgic", while "&Burn" sounds "powerful" and "resolute". Lindsay Howard of Variance labeled the former as "simmering". Robin Murray of Clash described "&Burn" as a "remarkable fusion that brings out the best in [Eilish] and [Staples]. Matthew Kent, writing for The Line of Best Fit, depicted the song as one of "Eilish's best tracks to date" and saw it as "a darker duet more akin to the track's lyrics about literally setting an ex's car on fire". The staff of NME explained that "the end product sees the pair feed off of each other's bolshy attitude as they trade verses in this hard-hitting reimagining of 'Watch', a restrained moment from 'Don't Smile at Me'". Nicole Almeida of Atwood Magazine dubbed the song as "stronger" and "bolder" than "Watch", but still "retain[s] the same vulnerability the original lyrics offer". Commercially, "&Burn" has been certified gold in the United States and platinum in Australia by the Recording Industry Association of America (RIAA) and Australian Recording Industry Association (ARIA), respectively. To promote "&Burn", Eilish performed it live at the Coachella Valley Music and Arts Festival with Staples in April 2019.

== Credits and personnel ==
Credits adapted from the liner notes of the Don't Smile at Me reissue.

- Billie Eilish – vocals
- Vince Staples – vocals, songwriter
- Finneas O'Connell – producer, songwriter
- John Greenham – mastering engineer, studio personnel
- Rob Kinelski – mixer, studio personnel

== Certifications ==
Certifications and sales for "&Burn"
Region	Certification	Certified units/sales
Australia (ARIA)	Platinum	70,000^{‡}
Brazil (Pro-Música Brasil)	Gold	20,000^{‡}
Canada (Music Canada)	Platinum	80,000^{‡}
New Zealand (RMNZ)	Gold	15,000^{‡}
United Kingdom (BPI)	Silver	200,000^{‡}
United States (RIAA)	Gold	500,000^{‡}
^{‡} Sales+streaming figures based on certification alone.
