= My Boy (Billie Eilish song) =

2017 single by Billie Eilish

Single by Billie Eilish

from the EP Don't Smile at Me
- Released: July 28, 2017
- Genre: Pop
- Length: 2:50
- Label: Darkroom; Interscope
- Songwriters: Billie Eilish; Finneas O'Connell
- Producer: Finneas O'Connell

Billie Eilish singles chronology
"Idontwannabeyouanymore" (2017)	"My Boy" (2017)	"&Burn" (2017)

Audio video
- "My Boy" on YouTube

"My Boy" is a song by American singer Billie Eilish. It was released by Darkroom and Interscope Records as the sixth single from Eilish's debut extended play (EP), Don't Smile at Me (2017). Eilish and her brother, Finneas O'Connell, co-wrote the song, with the latter solely handling the production. A pop track with funk- and jazz-influenced instrumentation, the song was heavily inspired by boys who broke Eilish's heart.

"My Boy" has been awarded several certifications, including a platinum by the Recording Industry Association of America (RIAA), double platinum by both the Australian Recording Industry Association (ARIA) and Recorded Music NZ, triple platinum by Music Canada (MC), and gold by the British Phonographic Industry (BPI). It was performed live by Eilish during her 2018 1 by 1 tour. A Troyboi remix was released on March 9, 2018.

== Background and composition ==
"My Boy" was released on July 28, 2017, as the sixth single on Eilish's debut EP Don't Smile at Me. The track was written by the singer and Finneas O'Connell, her brother and the track's sole producer. Mastering and mixing was handled by the studio personnel, John Greenham and Rob Kinelski, respectively. A remix of the song by TroyBoi titled "MyBoi" was released on March 9, 2018. Claire Ruder writing for Earmilk praised TroyBoi's remix, saying it "was able to successfully transform a tempo-changing short-and-sweet pop song into bass-laden and explosive EDM." And further mentions "'MyBoi,' turns chopped vocals from Billie into an instrument for the chorus of the track, paired with intricate layers of hi-hats, heavy kicks, and bass."

According to sheet music published by Universal Music Publishing Group at Musicnotes.com, "My Boy" has a moderately slow tempo of 69-72 beats per minute (BPM) and is played in the key of B minor. Eilish's vocals span a range of F♯_{3} to B_{4}. Critical commentary described "My Boy" as a funk- and jazz-influenced pop track. "My Boy" features a minimalist production consisting of a hi-hat and keyboard. According to Baeble Music's Olivia Lewis, the track begins with a "chiller, jazz-like vibe, and a layer of darkness and mystery": "My boy's being sus', he was shady enough, but now he's just a shadow/My boy loves his friends like I love my split ends." After the lyrics: "And by that, I mean, he cuts 'em off", a "funky" tempo change happens. The song soon becomes more upbeat while maintaining the heaviness of the intro: My boy's being sus' and he don't know how to cuss/He just sounds like he's tryna be his father (Who are you?)/My boy's an ugly crier but he's such a pretty liar/And by that I mean he said he'd 'change'".

== Reception and promotion ==
"My Boy" was praised by Insider's Callie Ahlgrim, who called the track "slow" and "mysterious" and felt its chorus "is so springy and elastic that it's almost distractingly danceable." "My Boy" experienced limited success on record charts, only reaching number 20 on the US Billboard Alternative Digital Song Sales chart. It, however, has been awarded several certifications; being certified triple platinum in Canada by Music Canada (MC), double platinum in both Australia by the Australian Recording Industry Association (ARIA) and in New Zealand by Recorded Music NZ (RMNZ), platinum in the United States by the Recording Industry Association of America (RIAA), and gold in the United Kingdom by the British Phonographic Industry (BPI). "My Boy" was performed live during Eilish's North American 1 by 1 tour in 2018.

== Covers ==
In 2019, American punk rock band, the SWMRS, covered "My Boy" at the Blondies in London for 50 of their biggest fans. The staff of Kerrang! called the SWMRS cover a "healthy dose of surfer punk rock".

== Track listing ==
Digital download
No.	Title	Length
1.	"My Boy"	2:50

Digital download – TroyBoi Remix
No.	Title	Length
1.	"MyBoi" (TroyBoi Remix)	3:31

== Personnel ==
Credits adapted from the liner notes of Don't Smile at Me.

- Billie Eilish – vocals, songwriter
- Finneas O'Connell – producer, songwriter
- John Greenham – mastering engineer
- Rob Kinelski – mixer

== Charts ==
Chart position for "My Boy"
Chart (2019)	Peak position
US Alternative Digital Song Sales (Billboard)	20

== Certifications ==
Certifications and sales for "My Boy"
Region	Certification	Certified units/sales
Australia (ARIA)	2× Platinum	140,000^{‡}
Austria (IFPI Austria)	Gold	15,000^{‡}
Brazil (Pro-Música Brasil)	Platinum	60,000^{‡}
Canada (Music Canada)	3× Platinum	240,000^{‡}
Denmark (IFPI Danmark)	Gold	45,000^{‡}
France (SNEP)	Gold	100,000^{‡}
New Zealand (RMNZ)	2× Platinum	60,000^{‡}
Poland (ZPAV)	Gold	10,000^{‡}
Portugal (AFP)	Gold	5,000^{‡}
Spain (Promusicae)	Gold	30,000^{‡}
United Kingdom (BPI)	Gold	400,000^{‡}
United States (RIAA)	Platinum	1,000,000^{‡}
^{‡} Sales+streaming figures based on certification alone.

== Release history ==
Release dates and formats for "My Boy"
Region	Date	Format(s)	Version	Label	Ref.
Various	July 28, 2017	Digital download; streaming	Original	Darkroom; Interscope	
Various	March 9, 2018	Digital download; streaming	TroyBoi Remix	Darkroom; Interscope	
