= Bitches Broken Hearts =

2018 single by Billie Eilish

Single by Billie Eilish
- A-side: "You Should See Me in a Crown"
- Published: November 10, 2017
- Released: March 30, 2018
- Genre: R&B
- Length: 2:56
- Label: Darkroom; Interscope
- Songwriters: Billie Eilish; Emmit Fenn; Finneas O'Connell
- Producers: Finneas O'Connell; Emmit Fenn

Billie Eilish singles chronology
"&Burn" (2017)	"Bitches Broken Hearts" (2018)	"Lovely" (2018)

Alternative cover
- Picture sleeve for the US 7-inch single, released in October 2018

"Bitches Broken Hearts" is a song recorded by American singer Billie Eilish. The song was written by Eilish, and its producers: Emmit Fenn and Finneas O'Connell. Originally released via SoundCloud on November 10, 2017, it was released as a standalone single on all digital platforms on March 30, 2018. The song was released on a 7-inch vinyl as the B-Side to her single "You Should See Me in a Crown". It was also included on the expanded edition of Eilish's debut EP, Don't Smile at Me (2017), as well as on the deluxe edition of her debut album, When We All Fall Asleep, Where Do We Go? (2019).

The lyrics of "Bitches Broken Hearts" address the aftermath of a breakup. The song received mainly positive reviews from music critics, several of whom praised the music and lyrics. It was certified platinum in the States and Canada by the Recording Industry Association of America (RIAA) and Music Canada (MC), respectively.

== Background and release ==
"Bitches Broken Hearts" was originally released through Eilish's SoundCloud on November 10, 2017. The song was later released for digital download and streaming on March 30, 2018, through Darkroom and Interscope Records. It was included as the B-side on the 7-inch vinyl of "You Should See Me in a Crown", released on October 20, 2018, and was sold exclusively during her 1 By 1 Tour. The song was included on the expanded edition of her debut EP, Don't Smile at Me, in December 2018, and the reissue of her debut album, When We All Fall Asleep, Where Do We Go?, the following December. "Bitches Broken Hearts" was written by the singer, her brother Finneas O'Connell and Emmit Fenn. The song was co-produced by Finneas and Fenn, making it the first Billie Eilish song to feature production from someone other than Finneas.

== Composition ==
Critical commentary described "Bitches Broken Hearts" as an R&B track. According to sheet music published at Musicnotes.com, "Bitches Broken Hearts" has a moderately fast tempo of 120 beats per minute (BPM) and is played in the key of A minor. Eilish's vocals span one octave from G_{3} to G_{4}. Lyrically, the song delves into the aftermath of a breakup, Eilish pretends that she no longer needs or cares about her former lover: “You can pretend you don’t miss me/You can pretend you don’t care/All you wanna do is kiss me/Oh, what a shame, I’m not there.” Eilish continues to her lovers' incompatibility, calling them "suicide and stolen art"; she also knows they'll both eventually move on and start to meet new people: "Somebody new is gonna comfort you/Like you want me to/Somebody new is gonna comfort me/Like you never do".

== Reception ==
"Bitches Broken Hearts" was met with generally favorable reviews from music critics. Insider's Claudia Willen, praised Eilish's vocals, saying she "[has] smooth vocals [that] float seamlessly through the track, effectively capturing the fleeting nature that often comes with young love". Kirsten Spruch of Billboard commented that the song has "subdued like a lot of the siblings' work" but has "a tropical flare, which makes it a great Eilish cut for those looking for something a bit more relaxing". Laurence Day of The Line of Best Fit viewed the song as a "intimacy and free-flowing energy of a raw demo take" and "it's still got all of Eilish's sensational vocal power". Commercially, "Bitches Broken Hearts" has been awarded a platinum certification in the United States and Canada by the Recording Industry Association of America (RIAA) and Music Canada (MC), respectively.

== Live performances ==
In July 2018, Eilish performed "Bitches Broken Hearts" for Vevo Lift. A video for the performance was released to YouTube on July 30, 2018, and was directed by Ryan Booth.

== Personnel ==
Credits adapted from liner notes of You Should See Me in a Crown / Bitches Broken Hearts.

- Billie Eilish – vocals, songwriter
- Finneas O'Connell – producer, songwriter, guitar, synthesizers, arrangement
- Emmit Fenn – producer, songwriter, engineer, mixer, mastering engineer, drum programming, piano, synthesizers, vocals

== Certifications ==
Certifications and sales for "Bitches Broken Hearts"
Region	Certification	Certified units/sales
Australia (ARIA)	Platinum	70,000^{‡}
Brazil (Pro-Música Brasil)	Platinum	40,000^{‡}
Canada (Music Canada)	2× Platinum	160,000^{‡}
Denmark (IFPI Danmark)	Gold	45,000^{‡}
Mexico (AMPROFON)	Gold	30,000^{‡}
New Zealand (RMNZ)	Platinum	30,000^{‡}
Poland (ZPAV)	Gold	10,000^{‡}
Portugal (AFP)	Gold	5,000^{‡}
United Kingdom (BPI)	Silver	200,000^{‡}
United States (RIAA)	Platinum	1,000,000^{‡}
^{‡} Sales+streaming figures based on certification alone.

== Release history ==
Release dates and formats for "Bitches Broken Hearts"
Region	Date	Format(s)	Label(s)	Ref.
Various	March 30, 2018	Digital download; streaming	Darkroom; Interscope	
United States	October 20, 2018	7"	Darkroom; Interscope	
