= Copycat (Billie Eilish song) =

2017 single by Billie Eilish

Single by Billie Eilish

from the EP Don't Smile at Me
- Released: July 14, 2017
- Genre: Electronica; pop
- Length: 3:13
- Label: Darkroom; Interscope
- Songwriters: Billie Eilish; Finneas O'Connell
- Producer: Finneas O'Connell

Billie Eilish singles chronology
"Watch" (2017)	"Copycat" (2017)	"Idontwannabeyouanymore" (2017)

Audio
- "Copycat" on YouTube

"Copycat" (stylized in all caps) is a song recorded by American singer-songwriter Billie Eilish. It was released by Darkroom and Interscope Records as the fourth single from Eilish's debut studio EP, Don't Smile at Me (2017). Eilish and her brother, Finneas O'Connell, co-wrote the song, with the latter solely handling the production. Musically an electronica and pop track with a hip hop-influenced instrumentation, the song was heavily inspired by someone who kept on copying Eilish and what she did.

Commercially, "Copycat" peaked at number 12 on the Billboard Bubbling Under Hot 100 chart and number 100 on the Canadian Hot 100. It has also received several certifications, notably a double platinum award from the Mexican Association of Producers of Phonograms and Videograms, A.C. (AMPROFON). The song was performed live during Eilish's 2019 When We All Fall Asleep Tour and her Where Do We Go? World Tour in 2020. A Sofi Tukker remix was released on January 12, 2018.

== Background and release ==
"Copycat" was released on July 14, 2017, as the fourth single on Eilish's debut EP Don't Smile at Me. "Copycat" was written by the singer and Finneas O'Connell, her brother and the track's sole producer. Mastering and mixing was handled by the studio personnel, John Greenham, and Rob Kinelski, respectively. In an interview with Genius, Eilish mentioned that she wrote the song with her brother about a girl who copies everything that she does. "I write with my brother mostly. That song, we were just in his room, and I was like, 'Yo! There's this fucking girl and she keeps doing everything that I do. And I want to write about it.' Because it was in my mind." A remix by Sofi Tukker was released on January 12, 2018. Dan Regan of Billboard praised the remix, saying its tone "beefs up [Copycat] with a club-ready rhythm", and has a "flush of colors in its disco cheeks as new layers of synthetic brightness come in waves."

== Music and lyrics ==
"Copycat" has been described as a hip-hop-influenced electronica and pop track in press reviews. According to sheet music published at Musicnotes.com, "Copycat" has a slow and constant tempo of 64 beats per minute (BPM) and is played in the key of E minor. Eilish's vocals span a range of E_{3} to G_{5}. It features a minimalist production consisting of a bass guitar and piano. Titiana Crisano of Billboard compared the instrumentation to the later work of XXXTentacion and Tyler, the Creator. In an interview with Billboard, Eilish stated that Finneas came up with the "weird, creepy bass sound" and she thought it was cool.

The song is Eilish's response to someone who kept copying everything she is doing: "Copycat trying to cop my manner/Watch your back when you can’t watch mine/Copycat trying to cop my glamour/Why so sad, bunny, you can’t have mine?" As the song reaches the bridge, the instrumentation turns into a piano ballad and Eilish's vocals become somewhat quiet and build into a falsetto and apologizes as she warns the person that they have reached their limit: "You just crossed the line/You've run out of time/I'm so sorry, now you know/Sorry I'm the one that told you so." She then tricks the listener with "psych" and returns to the original dark lyrics.

== Reception and live performances ==
Insider's Libby Torres, called the track a "precursor of sorts to 'Bad Guy'" and felt that "Copycat" lacks the "driving bass and increasingly-layered vocals" that made "Bad Guy" a good song. However, Torres concedes it is still a "worthy song that provides a tantalizing glimpse of Eilish's early potential". NME's Thomas Smith commented that "Copycat" was "impossibly swagger" with "scattered beats and energetic live performances making it a welcome entry point for many fans." Niall Byrne of The Irish Times described the ending as a "menacing synth" that reappears to "underscore her sullen demeanour". Kirsten Spruch of Billboard described the track as a "ground-shaking opener". Katherine Cusumano of W magazine cited the track as a "don't-eff-with-me opening statement".

"Copycat" did not enter the Billboard Hot 100, however, it peaked at number 12 on the Bubbling Under Hot 100 chart. The song also peaked at number 100 on the Canadian Hot 100. "Copycat" has been awarded notably a double platinum certification award from the Mexican Association of Producers of Phonograms and Videograms, A.C. (AMPROFON). Eilish performed "Copycat" at the Coachella Valley Music and Arts Festival in April, at the Glastonbury Festival in June, and at Pukkelpop in August 2019. "Copycat" was included on the setlist of Eilish's 2019 When We All Fall Asleep Tour, and on her 2020 Where Do We Go? World Tour. A fraction of song was interpolated during a performance of "Oxytocin" during Happier Than Ever, The World Tour (2022).

== Track listing ==
Digital download / streaming

1. "Copycat" – 3:14
2. "Watch" – 2:57

Digital download / streaming – Sofi Tukker remix

1. "Copycat" (Sofi Tukker remix) – 3:18

== Personnel ==
- Billie Eilish – vocals, songwriter
- Finneas O'Connell – songwriter, production
- John Greenham – mastering
- Rob Kinelski – mixing

== Charts ==
Weekly chart performance for "Copycat"
Chart (2019–2020)	Peak position
Canada Hot 100 (Billboard)	100
US Bubbling Under Hot 100 (Billboard)	12
US Alternative Digital Song Sales (Billboard)	17

== Certifications ==
Certifications and sales for "Copycat"
Region	Certification	Certified units/sales
Australia (ARIA)	2× Platinum	140,000^{‡}
Austria (IFPI Austria)	Gold	15,000^{‡}
Brazil (Pro-Música Brasil)	2× Platinum	120,000^{‡}
Canada (Music Canada)	4× Platinum	320,000^{‡}
Denmark (IFPI Danmark)	Gold	45,000^{‡}
France (SNEP)	Gold	100,000^{‡}
Mexico (AMPROFON)	2× Platinum	120,000^{‡}
New Zealand (RMNZ)	Platinum	30,000^{‡}
Poland (ZPAV)	Platinum	20,000^{‡}
Portugal (AFP)	Gold	5,000^{‡}
Spain (Promusicae) Sofi Tukker remix	Gold	30,000^{‡}
United Kingdom (BPI)	Gold	400,000^{‡}
United States (RIAA)	Platinum	1,000,000^{‡}
^{‡} Sales+streaming figures based on certification alone.

== Release history ==
Release dates and formats for "Copycat"
Region	Date	Format	Version	Label(s)	Ref.
Various	July 14, 2017	Digital download; streaming	Original	Darkroom; Interscope	
Various	January 12, 2018	Digital download; streaming	Sofi Tukker remix	Darkroom; Interscope	
