= Ocean Eyes (song) =

2015 debut single by Billie Eilish

Single by Billie Eilish

from the EP Don't Smile at Me
- Released: November 18, 2015 (SoundCloud); January 8, 2016 (promotional recording with Drup Music); November 18, 2016 (commercial release)
- Genre: Alternative hip-hop; dream pop; indie pop; R&B; synth-pop
- Length: 3:20
- Label: Drup Music; Darkroom; Interscope
- Songwriter: Finneas O'Connell
- Producer: Finneas O'Connell

Billie Eilish singles chronology
"Ocean Eyes" (2015)	"Six Feet Under" (2016)

Music video
- "Ocean Eyes" on YouTube

Alternative cover
- Original cover

"Ocean Eyes" is the debut single by American singer-songwriter Billie Eilish. It was initially released on SoundCloud on November 18, 2015, and then temporarily released as a promotional recording on January 8, 2016, with Drup Music. "Ocean Eyes" was solely written and produced by Eilish's brother Finneas O'Connell, who originally wrote it for his band, but later gave the song to Eilish after feeling the song suited her vocals.

On November 18, 2016, "Ocean Eyes" was officially released as the lead single from Eilish's debut extended play, Don't Smile at Me (2017), by Darkroom and Interscope Records. The song was also included on the soundtrack album to the film Everything, Everything (2017).

"Ocean Eyes" received mainly positive reviews from critics, several of whom praised its composition and lyrical content. The song did not appear on any charts until 2018, reaching number 84 on the US Billboard Hot 100, number 72 on the UK Singles Chart, and within the top 60 of the charts of several other countries. "Ocean Eyes" received diamond certifications in Canada, France, and Mexico, as well as multi-platinum certifications in Australia, Austria, Brazil, Denmark, New Zealand, Poland, Portugal, the United Kingdom, and the United States.

To promote the song, the track was accompanied by a music video, directed by Megan Thompson and released on March 24, 2016. A dance performance video was released on November 22, 2016. Eilish included the track on the set lists of her 2019 When We All Fall Asleep Tour, her 2020 Where Do We Go? World Tour, her 2022 Happier Than Ever, The World Tour, and her 2024–2025 Hit Me Hard and Soft: The Tour.

== Background and release ==
"Ocean Eyes" was written, mixed, and produced by Billie Eilish's brother, Finneas O'Connell. He had written and produced the song originally for his band, the Slightlys, before realizing it would be a better fit for Eilish's vocals. He gave it to Eilish when her dance teacher at the Revolution Dance Center (Honolulu Avenue, Los Angeles) Fred Diaz asked them to write a song for choreography. Eilish has cited the Låpsley song "Station" as a key influence on "Ocean Eyes".

The track was entirely made using Logic stock sounds. The vocals were recorded with an Audio-Technica AT2020 microphone. In a 2017 interview with Teen Vogue, Eilish said: "[Finneas] came to me with 'Ocean Eyes,' which he had originally written for his band. He told me he thought it would sound really good in my voice. He taught me the song and we sang it together along to his guitar and I loved it. It was stuck in [my] head for weeks." Finneas would later become Eilish's manager.

Eilish and her brother uploaded the track to SoundCloud on November 18, 2015, so Diaz could have access to it. The song went viral overnight. When Eilish got a growth plate injury, it put an end to her dancing career and she turned her focus toward a recording career. After Eilish signed to Darkroom and Interscope Records, "Ocean Eyes" was re-released for digital download and streaming on November 18, 2016, as the lead single of Eilish's debut EP, Don't Smile at Me, and the soundtrack album to the film Everything, Everything (2017). Mastering was handled by John Greenham. An EP featuring remixes by Astronomyy, Blackbear, Goldhouse and Cautious Clay was released on January 14, 2017.

In 2023, Katy Perry revealed that she was sent an email by Unsub Records about "Ocean Eyes" with hopes of collaboration when it was to be released. But she thought it "was just a blonde girl" and "Meh, boring". In retrospect, however, she dubbed it a "Big mistake. Huge mistake."

== Composition and lyrical interpretation ==
"Ocean Eyes"
A sample of "Ocean Eyes", featuring percussion, synths, minimalist beats, and Eilish's soprano vocals

"Ocean Eyes" has a tempo of 145 beats per minute (BPM). The song is played in the key of E minor, while Eilish's vocals span a range of E_{3} to E_{5}. Critics described "Ocean Eyes" as a pop, alternative hip-hop, dream-pop, synth-pop, indie-pop, and R&B ballad. Laurence Day of The Line of Best Fit described it as having "sparse percussion" and "low-slung bass", adding that Eilish's vocals "are soft and melodic, dispersing amongst the effervescent synths". Writing for i-D, Mathias Rosenzweig described the song as an "unhurried, minimalist beats and lush synths, reminiscent of ocean waves on a dreary grey day". Eilish uses her soprano voice in the track.

Mathias Rosenzweig of Vogue stated that Eilish compares "love to falling off a cliff" and that she is "surrounded by the warlike intensity of napalm skies" and further says it's "a profound description for a 14-year-old, and it's led to an enormous amount of interest in her debut song—as well as the singer herself". Rosenzweig mentions that the song has "airy soprano vocals [that] also conjure up thoughts of the ocean washing over the song's mellow percussion and minimalist synths", adding that its "maturity paired with a few childish ideals—she sings, for example, that love is 'no fair'—struck a chord". Claudia Willen of Insider stated that lyrically, "Ocean Eyes" is about a "dreamy love letter to a crush with ocean eyes": "I've been watchin' you for sometime/Can't stop staring at those ocean eyes/Burning cities and napalm skies/Fifteen flares inside those ocean eyes/Your ocean eyes".

== Critical response ==
Upon release, "Ocean Eyes" received critical acclaim from music critics. Timothy Monger of AllMusic called the track "lush" and "lonesome". Writing for Billboard, Jason Lipshutz described the track as "understated" and "heartbreaking". Rebecca Haithcoat of SSENSE labelled "Ocean Eyes" as "gauzy". Stephen Thompson of NPR cited the track as "moody". Nicole Almeida of Atwood Magazine commended the lyrical content, which she described as "vulnerable" and "atmospheric", and mentions "the layered vocals and Eilish's great voice make this song special". Adrien Begrand from PopMatters affirmed the song shows Eilish's "precocious talent". Mike Wass writing for Idolator labeled the song as a "dreamy ballad".

NME ranked it as the 14th-best song in Eilish's discography in 2022, with Thomas Smith saying that the "most memorable moments on 'Ocean Eyes' are its most vulnerable, like the opening whispers or the sure-footed yet restrained chorus". Insider wrote that "one could easily question if Eilish would be the household name she is now without the success of this stunning [song]". Dan Regan of Billboard praised Astronomyy's remix, saying that "[Eilish's] voice echoes over a stripped down intro before a tinny beat kicks in with some new background vocals", while adding that Blackbear's remix brought the song "new emotional heights", "trapped ou with 808 tinges and even more ghostly with his added vocal harmonies".

== Commercial performance ==
"Ocean Eyes" first peaked at number 11 on the Bubbling Under Hot 100 chart on November 11, 2018. Following the release of Eilish's debut studio album, When We All Fall Asleep, Where Do We Go? (2019), "Ocean Eyes" rose to number 84 on the US Billboard Hot 100 chart. At the same time, Eilish broke the record for the most simultaneous Hot 100 entries for a female artist. "Ocean Eyes" has received an eight-platinum certification by the Recording Industry Association of America (RIAA), which denotes track-equivalent sales of eight million units based on sales and streams. In the United Kingdom, the single peaked at number 72 on the UK Singles Chart, and has received a triple platinum certification from the British Phonographic Industry (BPI), which denotes track-equivalent sales of 1,800,000 units. It was also successful in Australia, peaking at number 58 on the ARIA Charts and being awarded a 10× platinum certification by the Australian Recording Industry Association (ARIA) in 2025. "Ocean Eyes" also received diamond certifications in Canada, France, and Mexico; multi-platinum certifications in Austria, Brazil, Denmark, New Zealand, Poland, and Portugal; and platinum certifications in Germany, Italy, and Spain.

== Performances ==
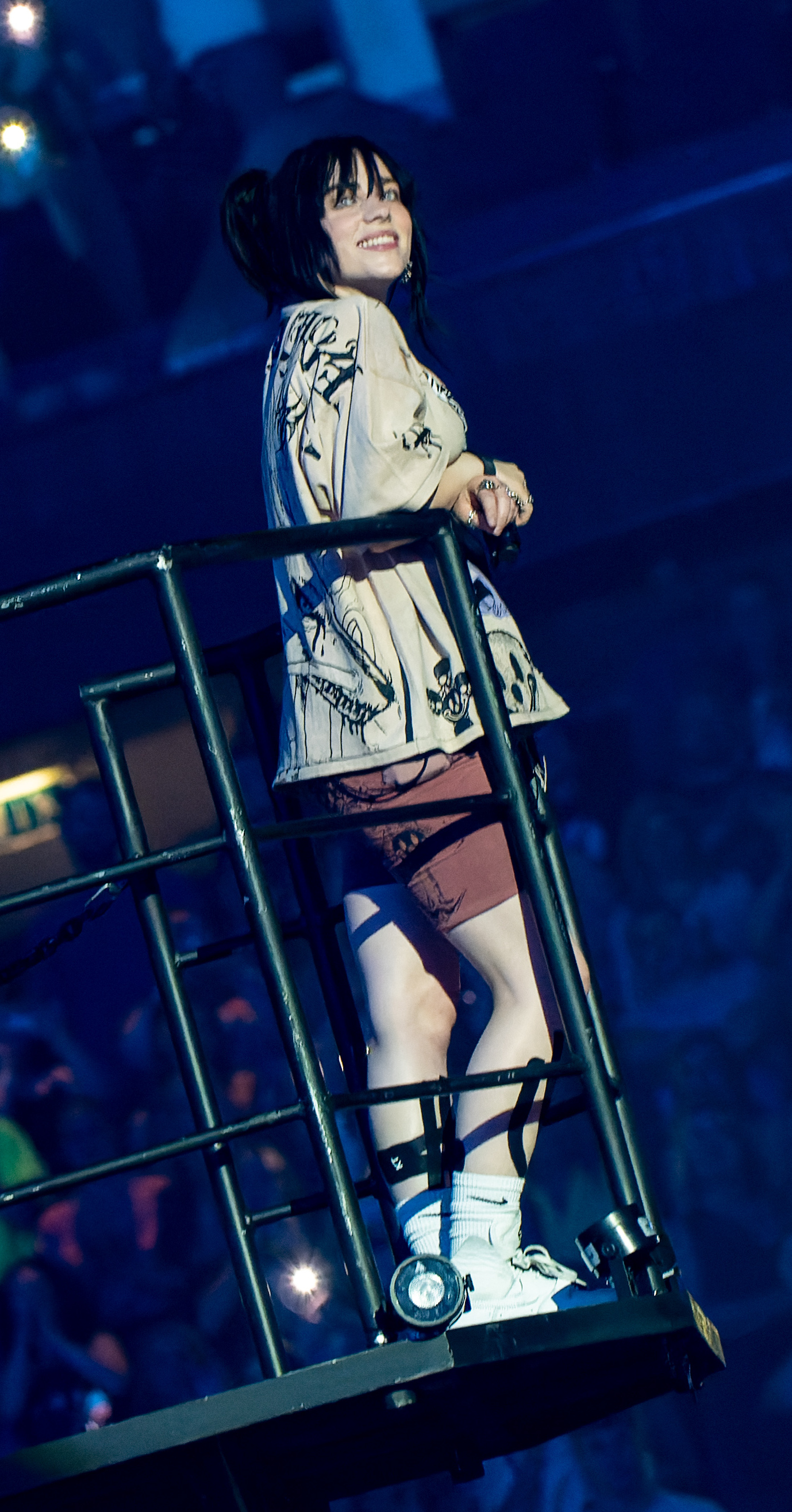
Eilish performing "Ocean Eyes" as part of the Happier Than Ever, The World Tour (2022)

A music video for "Ocean Eyes" directed by Megan Thompson was uploaded to Eilish's official YouTube channel on March 24, 2016. The visual sees Eilish singing to the camera while a torrent of lilac smoke surrounds her. Chris Deville of Stereogum praised Thompson's directing, saying it "will certainly help" the song for the future. A dance performance video was also uploaded to Eilish's official YouTube channel on November 22, 2016. Rosenzweig described the dance visual as a "scaled-back, emotional choreography".

"Ocean Eyes" was performed live during Eilish's North American 1 by 1 tour in 2018. Eilish performed it at the Coachella Valley Music and Arts Festival in April 2019, at the Glastonbury Festival in June, and at Pukkelpop in August 2019. "Ocean Eyes" was included on the set list of Eilish's 2019 When We All Fall Asleep Tour. The track was also included on the set list of her 2020 Where Do We Go? World Tour. In December 2019, Eilish performed "Ocean Eyes" for The Late Late Show with James Corden, with Alicia Keys playing the piano in front of an all-women studio audience. The two singers would swap vocals. A demo of the song was made available on Logic Pro X in May 2020.

During her 2022 Happier Than Ever, The World Tour, Eilish performed "Ocean Eyes" as part of a medley with "Bored" and "Bellyache". In 2024, Eilish performed the song with Lana Del Rey on the first night of the opening weekend at the Coachella Valley Music and Arts Festival. They also performed Del Rey's debut single, "Video Games". During her 2024–2025 Hit Me Hard and Soft: The Tour, Eilish performed "Ocean Eyes" as part of a medley with "Blue" and "Lovely".

== Covers by other artists ==
Alicia Keys covered "Ocean Eyes" in December 2019 as part of Spotify's Singles series. Rania Aniftos of Billboard wrote that Keys's cover gave "Ocean Eyes" a "characteristically soulful twist with a piano arrangement". In March 2024, the Gaslight Anthem released a cover version of "Ocean Eyes" as part of their EP History Books (Short Stories). The cover "starts off with a haunting vocalisation before jumping straight into a loud drumbeat and chugging guitar while frontman Brian Fallon juxtaposes Eilish's original soft vocals with his raspy voice".

== Track listing ==
Digital download and streaming
No.	Title	Length
1.	"Ocean Eyes"	3:20

Digital download and streaming – The Remixes EP
No.	Title	Length
1.	"Ocean Eyes" (Astronomyy Remix)	4:56
2.	"Ocean Eyes" (Blackbear Remix)	3:15
3.	"Ocean Eyes" (Goldhouse Remix)	3:33
4.	"Ocean Eyes" (Cautious Clay Remix)	3:11

== Credits and personnel ==
Credits adapted from the liner notes of Don't Smile at Me

- Billie Eilish – vocals
- Finneas O'Connell – producer, songwriter, mixer
- John Greenham – mastering engineer

== Charts ==
=== Weekly charts ===
Chart (2018–2025)	Peak position
Australia (ARIA)	58
Canada Hot 100 (Billboard)	68
Czech Republic Singles Digital (ČNS IFPI)	62
France (SNEP)	43
Germany (GfK)	16
Global 200 (Billboard)	100
Ireland (IRMA)	50
Netherlands (Single Top 100)	52
New Zealand (Recorded Music NZ) Version with Astronomyy	38
Norway (VG-lista)	73
Portugal (AFP)	92
Scottish Singles Sales (Official Charts)	50
Slovakia Singles Digital (ČNS IFPI)	83
Sweden (Sverigetopplistan)	88
UK Singles (Official Charts)	60
US Billboard Hot 100	84
US Rolling Stone Top 100	51

=== Year-end charts ===
Chart (2019)	Position
Portugal (AFP)	147
US Rolling Stone Top 100	66

Chart (2020)	Position
Portugal (AFP)	169

== Certifications ==
Region	Certification	Certified units/sales
Australia (ARIA)	10× Platinum	700,000^{‡}
Austria (IFPI Austria)	2× Platinum	60,000^{‡}
Brazil (Pro-Música Brasil)	2× Platinum	120,000^{‡}
Canada (Music Canada)	Diamond	800,000^{‡}
Denmark (IFPI Danmark)	5× Platinum	450,000^{‡}
France (SNEP)	Diamond	333,333^{‡}
Germany (BVMI)	Platinum	600,000^{‡}
Italy (FIMI)	Platinum	70,000^{‡}
Mexico (AMPROFON)	2× Diamond+4× Platinum	840,000^{‡}
New Zealand (RMNZ)	8× Platinum	240,000^{‡}
Norway (IFPI Norway)	Gold	30,000^{‡}
Poland (ZPAV)	3× Platinum	150,000^{‡}
Portugal (AFP)	2× Platinum	20,000^{‡}
Spain (Promusicae)	Platinum	60,000^{‡}
United Kingdom (BPI)	3× Platinum	1,800,000^{‡}
United States (RIAA)	8× Platinum	8,000,000^{‡}
^{‡} Sales+streaming figures based on certification alone.

== Release history ==
Region	Date	Format	Label	Ref.
Various	November 18, 2016	Digital download and streaming	Darkroom; Interscope	
Various	January 13, 2017	Digital download and streaming (The Remixes EP)	Darkroom; Interscope	

== See also ==
- List of highest-certified singles in Australia
- List of best-selling singles in Mexico
