= Watch (Billie Eilish song) =

2017 single by Billie Eilish

Single by Billie Eilish

from the EP Don't Smile at Me
- Released: June 30, 2017
- Length: 2:57
- Label: Darkroom; Interscope
- Songwriter: Finneas O'Connell
- Producer: Finneas O'Connell

Billie Eilish singles chronology
"Bored" (2017)	"Watch" (2017)	"Copycat" (2017)

Music video
- "Watch" on YouTube

"Watch" is a song by American singer Billie Eilish from her debut EP Don't Smile at Me (2017). Written and produced by Eilish's brother Finneas O'Connell, the song was released for digital download and streaming through Darkroom and Interscope Records on June 30, 2017, as the third single from the EP.

A pop-influenced ballad, the lyrics of "Watch" address Eilish leaving a toxic relationship. The song received platinum certifications in the United States, Australia and Canada by the Recording Industry Association of America (RIAA), Australian Recording Industry Association (ARIA) and Music Canada (MC), respectively. A music video for the track was released on September 18, 2017, and was directed by Megan Park. In the visual, Eilish sets the remnants of a toxic relationship on fire and dumps her former lover. "Watch" was performed live by Eilish during her 2019 When We All Fall Asleep Tour.

== Background and composition ==
"Watch" was released on June 30, 2017, as the third single on Eilish's debut EP Don't Smile at Me. The track was written and produced by Eilish's brother, Finneas O'Connell. Mastering and mixing was handled by the studio personnel, John Greenham and Rob Kinelski, respectively. The song was originally titled "Watch & Burn", before becoming two separate tracks, one being "Watch" and the other being "&Burn", a collaboration with Vince Staples.

According to sheet music published by Hal Leonard Music Publishing at Musicnotes.com, "Watch" has a moderately fast tempo of 80–84 beats per minute (BPM) and is played in the key of C Major, while Eilish's vocals range from G_{3} to C_{5}. The song was described as a ballad with a verse-chorus pop structure by music critics. The song starts with the strike of a match and continues throughout the song as its main beat. In the lyrics, Eilish writes a missive to her former lover, saying she is leaving their toxic relationship behind: "If we were meant to be, we would have been by now/See what you wanna see, but all I see is him right now." As the chorus comes in, Eilish sings about not wanting to be in the relationship anymore: "I'll sit and watch your car burn/With the fire that you started in me/But you never came back to ask it out." Finneas later explained in an interview with Pitchfork saying: "This is me just lighting a bunch of matches in the bathroom. It became the snare essentially for [the] song. There were all these references to starting a fire and that’s a more inventive way to use a sound than to just be like, 'Yeah, we’re gonna start with the sound of the waves rolling in or something.'"

== Reception ==
"Watch" was met with critical acclaim from music critics. Insider's Claudia Willen wrote that the song "provided a mere glimpse of the greatness to come in Eilish's career." Nicole Almeida of Atwood Magazine commended the production, which she described as "meticulous" and "amazing". Avery Stone of Vice described the chorus as "sweeping". It was ranked number 28 by NME's Sam Moore, who compared it to Lorde's compositions and affirmed it was a "stepping stone towards bigger and better things". The track has been awarded several certifications; including double platinum in Australia, and platinum in Canada and the United States by the Australian Recording Industry Association (ARIA), Music Canada (MC), and the Recording Industry Association of America (RIAA), respectively.

== Promotion ==
A music video for "Watch" was released on September 18, 2017, and directed by Canadian actress Megan Park. In the video, Eilish sets the remnants of a toxic relationship on fire and dumps her former lover. The singer stated in an interview with Vice that Park came up with her sitting in a bedroom during the video: "You see that room is right across from the ladder where I'm burning. And I get up and I walk over to the other 'ladder.' who represents the old me, who's hurt and heartbroken by this boy, and can't do anything without thinking about this person. And the new me is kind of over it. So I go up to the old me like, 'Screw you, I'm going to light you on fire now.'" In March 2018, Eilish and Finneas performed an acoustic version of "Watch". The track was also performed live during Eilish's North American 1 by 1 tour. It was also included on the setlist of her When We All Fall Asleep Tour (2019).

== Personnel ==
Credits adapted from the liner notes of Don't Smile at Me.

- Billie Eilish – vocals
- Finneas O'Connell – producer, songwriter
- John Greenham – mastering engineer, studio personnel
- Rob Kinelski – mixer, studio personnel

== Certifications ==
Certifications and sales for "Watch"
Region	Certification	Certified units/sales
Australia (ARIA)	3× Platinum	210,000^{‡}
Austria (IFPI Austria)	Platinum	30,000^{‡}
Brazil (Pro-Música Brasil)	Platinum	60,000^{‡}
Canada (Music Canada)	4× Platinum	320,000^{‡}
Denmark (IFPI Danmark)	Gold	45,000^{‡}
France (SNEP)	Gold	100,000^{‡}
Mexico (AMPROFON)	Gold	30,000^{‡}
New Zealand (RMNZ)	2× Platinum	60,000^{‡}
Poland (ZPAV)	Gold	10,000^{‡}
Portugal (AFP)	Gold	5,000^{‡}
Spain (Promusicae)	Gold	30,000^{‡}
United Kingdom (BPI)	Platinum	600,000^{‡}
United States (RIAA)	Platinum	1,000,000^{‡}
^{‡} Sales+streaming figures based on certification alone.
