= Idontwannabeyouanymore =

2017 single by Billie Eilish

Single by Billie Eilish

from the EP Don't Smile at Me
- Released: July 21, 2017
- Genre: Neo soul; pop; R&B
- Length: 3:24
- Label: Darkroom; Interscope
- Songwriters: Billie Eilish; Finneas O'Connell
- Producer: Finneas O'Connell

Billie Eilish singles chronology
"Copycat" (2017)	"Idontwannabeyouanymore" (2017)	"My Boy" (2017)

Vertical video
- "Idontwannabeyouanymore" on YouTube

"Idontwannabeyouanymore" (stylized in all lowercase) is a song by American singer Billie Eilish from her debut EP, Don't Smile at Me (2017). Eilish and her brother, Finneas O'Connell, co-wrote the song, with the latter solely handling the production. It was released through Darkroom and Interscope Records on July 21, 2017, as the fifth single from the EP. Musically, the song is a neo soul, pop, and R&B track with a jazz-influenced melody, that was heavily inspired by Eilish being depressed.

Commercially, "Idontwannabeyouanymore" reached number 96 on the Billboard Hot 100. It has also received several certifications, including double-platinum awards from the Mexican Association of Producers of Phonograms and Videograms, A.C. (AMPROFON) and the Recording Industry Association of America (RIAA). The song was performed live during Eilish's 2019 When We All Fall Asleep Tour and her Where Do We Go? World Tour in 2020, and again on her 2022 Happier Than Ever, The World Tour.

== Background and release ==
"Idontwannabeyouanymore" was conceived when Eilish was suffering from depression. In an interview with Genius, Eilish stated "I have still dealt with depression. 'Idontwannabeyouanymore' is about times I’ve felt this way. The real truth is that depression can happen to anyone no matter who you are or what you have and there is no shame to admitting that you feel this way. It’s a very real thing and should never be ignored or labeled 'a choice'." She compared the song to her 2017 single "Copycat". On July 21, 2017, "Idontwannabeyouanymore" was released as the fifth single on Eilish's debut EP Don't Smile at Me (2017). "Idontwannabeyouanymore" was written by the singer and her brother Finneas O'Connell, the latter of which also produced it. Studio personnel John Greenham and Rob Kinelski handled the mastering and mixing, respectively.

== Composition and lyrical interpretation ==
According to sheet music website Musicnotes.com, "Idontwannabeyouanymore" has a gentle lilt tempo of 57 beats per minute (BPM) and is played in the key of E minor. Eilish's vocals range from G_{3} to D_{5}. Critical commentary described the song as a neo soul, pop, and R&B track with a jazz-influenced melody. Many critics noted influences from Amy Winehouse and Lana Del Rey in the song.

"Idontwannabeyouanymore" finds Eilish singing about self-doubt and negative self-esteem: "Hands getting cold/Losing feeling is getting old/Was I made from a broken mold?/Hurt, I can’t shake/We’ve made every mistake/Only you know the way that I break."

The song starts off with a piano, before Eilish begins to sing about struggling with self-doubt while dealing with how society wants her to be. Eilish refers to models and people's tendencies to judge someone for what the clothes they wear: "If teardrops could be bottled/There’d be swimming pools filled by models/Told the tight dress is what makes you a whore." But as the song progresses, Eilish becomes accustomed to her dissatisfaction until she finally admits she doesn't want to be herself anymore. According to Libby Torres of Insider Eilish sings about being "determined to break out on her own and become her own person", but the chorus suggests that she feels complicit or to blame in her failed relationship with herself."

== Critical reception ==
Writing for Clash magazine, Steph Kretowicz described "Idontwannabeyouanymore" as a "breathy catharsis". Nicole Almedia of Atwood Magazine described Eilish's vocals as a "great display of [her] vocal capacity" and praised her capability of "delivering powerful sentimentality in every word". In her review for Earmilk, Jess Bartlet stated the track has a "vocal vulnerability and innocence that wouldn't sound out of place in Quentin Tarantino's Kill Bill". Insider's Libby Torres remarked that "Idontwannabeyouanymore" when combined with her "airy vocals" and "gently flowing piano", it makes the track a "perfect song". The song placed at number 20 on NME's "Every single Billie Eilish song ranked in order of greatness" list, with the staff calling it an "upbeat piano-pop [that] belies the painful grapple with weightier and more serious issues of self-esteem and depression".

== Commercial performance ==
"Idontwannabeyouanymore" became Eilish's third entry on the US Billboard Bubbling Under Hot 100 songs chart. The song later went on to debut on the main Billboard Hot 100 chart at number 100, following the release of a viral short clip that featured the song. Following the release of Eilish's debut studio album When We All Fall Asleep, Where Do We Go?, "Idontwannabeyouanymore" rose to number 96 the chart and stayed there for three weeks. At the same time, Eilish broke the record for the most simultaneous Hot 100 entries for a female artist. "Idontwannabeyouanymore" received a double-platinum certification by the Recording Industry Association of America (RIAA), which denotes track-equivalent sales of two million units based on sales and streams. In the United Kingdom, the single peaked at number 78 on the UK Singles Chart, and was certified platinum by the British Phonographic Industry (BPI), for track-equivalent sales of 600,000 units "Idontwannabeyouanymore" was also successful in Canada, peaking at number 60 on the Canadian Hot 100 and being awarded a platinum certification from Music Canada (MC), for 80,000 track-equivalent unit sales.

== Promotion ==
In December 2017, Eilish premiered a Spotify-released vertical video to accompany the song. It was eventually released on YouTube on January 4, 2018. In the minimalistic visual, it portrays a silver-haired Eilish in an all-white room talking to her reflection in a mirror about how she hates herself. Shweta Patokar writing for Republic World commented that what makes the video scary is how "close it is to reality".

Eilish has promoted "Idontwannabeyouanymore" with several live performances. "Idontwannabeyouanymore" was performed live during Eilish's North American 1 by 1 tour in 2018. She performed the track live for BBC Radio 1 in February 2019. Eilish's performance of the song for German music platform COLORS remains the most viewed video on their YouTube channel, with over 100 million views. It was included on the setlist of her When We All Fall Asleep Tour (2019). She also performed the track at Pukkelpop in August 2019. Eilish performed the song live at Third Man Records with Finneas, and later released it on a live album entitled Live at Third Man Records (2020). In December of that year, She performed the track at the Steve Jobs Theater for the first annual Apple Music Awards after she won artist of the year, with Finneas playing the guitar. It was eventually added to the singer's 2020 Where Do We Go? World Tour.

== Remixes and covers ==
A remix by Elijah Hill was released on September 15, 2018, for Trap Nation through YouTube and SoundCloud. Dan Regan of Billboard praised the remix, saying Hill "catches it like a piece on confetti on the wind and brings it to the top of a mountain" and is another "future bass remix big enough to fill a stadium".

In November 2019, The Devil Clefs, an a cappella group from Arizona State University, covered the track. A few days later, it went viral on YouTube and TikTok. On February 25, 2020, 18-year-old singer Chelle from Indiana, sang "Idontwannabeyouanymore" for her audition on The Voice. In his audition for America's Got Talent on July 15, 2020, Australian masked singer Sheldon Riley covered the track. Judge Simon Cowell praised the cover, telling Riley he has an amazing voice. In August of the same year, American singer Kelly Clarkson, covered it for her talk show, The Kelly Clarkson Show, live from her home. Gil Kaufman of Billboard described the cover "steer[s] the ballad down a smoky avenue, turning the pop ballad kind of blue thanks to tasteful stand-up bass, brushed drums and soulful organ runs."

== Personnel ==
Credits adapted from Tidal.

- Billie Eilish – vocals, songwriter
- Finneas O'Connell – producer, songwriter
- Rob Kinelski – mixer
- John Greenham – mastering engineer

== Charts ==
=== Weekly charts ===
Weekly chart performance for "Idontwannabeyouanymore"
Chart (2018–2020)	Peak position
Canada Hot 100 (Billboard)	60
Greece (IFPI)	55
Ireland (IRMA)	54
Lithuania (AGATA)	49
Netherlands (Single Tip)	14
South Korea (Gaon)	174
Sweden Heatseeker (Sverigetopplistan)	2
UK Singles (Official Charts)	78
US Billboard Hot 100	96

=== Year-end charts ===
2019 year-end chart performance for "Idontwannabeyouanymore"
Chart (2019)	Position
Portugal (AFP)	192
South Korea (Gaon)	171
US Alternative Digital Song Sales (Billboard)	24

== Certifications ==
Certifications and sales for "Idontwannabeyouanymore"
Region	Certification	Certified units/sales
Australia (ARIA)	4× Platinum	280,000^{‡}
Austria (IFPI Austria)	Platinum	30,000^{‡}
Brazil (Pro-Música Brasil)	3× Platinum	180,000^{‡}
Canada (Music Canada)	6× Platinum	480,000^{‡}
Denmark (IFPI Danmark)	Platinum	90,000^{‡}
France (SNEP)	Platinum	200,000^{‡}
Italy (FIMI)	Gold	35,000^{‡}
Mexico (AMPROFON)	2× Platinum+Gold	150,000^{‡}
New Zealand (RMNZ)	3× Platinum	90,000^{‡}
Poland (ZPAV)	Platinum	20,000^{‡}
Portugal (AFP)	Platinum	10,000^{‡}
Spain (Promusicae)	Platinum	60,000^{‡}
United Kingdom (BPI)	Platinum	600,000^{‡}
United States (RIAA)	2× Platinum	2,000,000^{‡}
^{‡} Sales+streaming figures based on certification alone.
