= Bellyache (Billie Eilish song) =

2017 single by Billie Eilish

Single by Billie Eilish

from the EP Don't Smile at Me
- Released: February 24, 2017
- Genre: Alternative hip-hop; electropop
- Length: 2:59
- Label: Darkroom; Interscope
- Songwriters: Billie Eilish; Finneas O'Connell
- Producer: Finneas O'Connell

Billie Eilish singles chronology
"Six Feet Under" (2016)	"Bellyache" (2017)	"Bored" (2017)

Music video
- "Bellyache" on YouTube

"Bellyache" is a song by American singer Billie Eilish from her debut EP, Don't Smile at Me (2017). The song was released as the EP's second single on February 24, 2017, through Darkroom and Interscope Records. It was written by Eilish and Finneas O'Connell, with production being handled by the latter. A midtempo alternative hip-hop and electropop song, it has deep house, Latin macabre, and R&B influences. Lyrically, the song is written from the perspective of a psychopathic murderer. A remix by Marian Hill was released on May 5, 2017. The song received mainly positive reviews from music critics, several of whom praised the production and lyrics.

The song was accompanied by a music video, which was released on March 22, 2017. In it, Eilish is depicted in an all-yellow outfit as she throws dollar bills in the air and dances along the highway. Although "Bellyache" did not enter the US Billboard Hot 100, it peaked at number three on the US Bubbling Under Hot 100 chart for 32 non-consecutive weeks, making it one of the longest running songs to chart there without ever entering the Hot 100. The song entered the top 100 of charts in Australia, Canada, Ireland, Portugal, and Scotland. It was certified multiple platinum in Australia, the United States, and Mexico by the Australian Recording Industry Association (ARIA), Recording Industry Association of America (RIAA), and Mexican Association of Producers of Phonograms and Videograms, A.C. (AMPROFON). Eilish included the song on the setlists of her 2019 When We All Fall Asleep Tour and her 2020 Where Do We Go? World Tour, and again on her 2022 Happier Than Ever, The World Tour.

== Background and release ==
"Bellyache" was released for digital download and streaming on February 24, 2017, as the second single from Eilish's debut EP Don't Smile at Me, through Darkroom and Interscope Records. The track was written by Eilish and her brother Finneas O'Connell, known under his stage name of Finneas, with him solely handling production. Mastering and mixing were handled by studio personnel John Greenham and Rob Kinelski, respectively. In December 2021, American rapper and singer Doja Cat revealed that she was asked by Eilish to feature on the track during its early stages of development, yet declined since she was experiencing writer's block at the time. In an interview with Teen Vogue, Eilish stated that "Garbage" (2013) by American rapper Tyler, the Creator was the biggest inspiration for the song: "'Garbage' was one of the biggest inspirations for writing my song, 'bellyache'. It's more graphic than my song, it's more literal and 'I'm killing people and putting them in my basement' kind of song. I'm a huge fan of Tyler, he's been my biggest inspiration ever." She further cited Skylar Grey's "Final Warning" as an inspiration for the song. A remix of the song was created by Marian Hill, an American songwriting duo, and was released on May 5, 2017, for digital download. Dan Regan of Billboard praised the remix, saying it "amplifies the off-center feel with a wonky, futuristic take". He continued, writing that the "groove is sly and just a little crazed".

== Composition and lyrics ==
Critical commentary described "Bellyache" as a midtempo alternative hip-hop and electropop song. It has influences of deep house, hip-hop, Latin macabre, and R&B in the instrumentation. According to sheet music published by Universal Music Publishing Group at Musicnotes.com, "Bellyache" is composed in the key of E minor, at a moderate tempo of 100 beats per minute. Eilish's vocals span a range of E3 to B4. Jason Lipshutz of Billboard mentioned that "Bellyache" has "macabre lyrics around a delectable pre-chorus hook and a steady acoustic pattern that eventually gives way to a sizzling drum machine".

The lyrics were inspired by the childhood guilt she felt after stealing toys from friends and her crippling stomach pains. Eilish said that is about "the concept of guilt". The song's lyrics were written from an entirely fictional perspective of a psychopath who kills those she is close to, including her friends and lover. Eilish takes on the persona of the psychopath who has killed her friends and dumped their bodies in the back seat of her car. She also sings about killing her lover and ditching his body in a gutter. The song's lyrics reference action film V for Vendetta (2005). Eilish told Paper magazine the plot of the song: "[The] [song] [is] [about] killing people and feeling guilty about it. [It's about] getting a bellyache because you just killed a bunch of people, which you would if you just killed a bunch of people if you were human. We kind of just became this character that knows they're out of their mind, but also doesn't at the same time."

== Critical reception ==
"Bellyache" was met with mostly positive reviews from music critics, with a number of them praising the lyrics and production. Mike Wass, writing for Idolator, called it a "sinister synth-anthem that positively seethes fury and frustration". Writing for Elle magazine, Estelle Tang labeled the song as a "banger about bad decisions". Eve Barlow of Vice described "Bellyache" as "totally psycho" and "perfectly pop". Meaghan Garvey, writing for The Fader, cited the track as a "loping" and "cowboy-ish number with a touch of deep-house bounce". Ilana Kaplan of Paper noted that while Eilish's 2016 singles "Ocean Eyes" and "Six Feet Under" are more pop, "Bellyache" has "more of an R&B production angle", and admitted it would become more prominent as Eilish released more songs in the future.

Mark Savage lauded the song in his review for BBC News, saying it is the "pop equivalent" to the works of Quentin Tarantino, and finds "comic absurdity in the midst of eye-popping gore". The staff of LadyGunn compared the track to "Ocean Eyes", saying it "evoke[s] a darker Lorde over a trap-infused beat". Writing for Atwood Magazine, Nicole Almeida commented that "Bellyache" gets "better with every listen". She elaborated, mentioning that "the casual guitar strums coupled with Eilish unapologetic embodiment of [the] character and beats really challenge you not to move to them". Almedia concluded by calling the song "one of the EP's highlights". Adrien Begrand from PopMatters affirmed the song shows Eilish's "precocious talent".

NME ranked "Bellyache" at number four on their 'Every single Billie Eilish song ranked in order of greatness' list. The staff described it as "a twisted song, but with a pinch of wry humor". Insider's described the lyrics as "violent" and "dark", commenting that they "belie the song's quietly upbeat melody", and prove Eilish and Finneas as "some of the most talented and versatile artists making music today".

== Commercial performance ==
Commercially, "Bellyache" did not enter the US Billboard Hot 100, though it peaked at number three on the US Bubbling Under Hot 100 chart, spending a milestone of 32 weeks on the chart. On the US Alternative Digital Song Sales chart, the track peaked at number 11. "Bellyache" received a double-platinum certification by the Recording Industry Association of America (RIAA), which denotes track-equivalent sales of 2,000,000 certified units in the United States. The song was more successful outside of the US. In Australia, "Bellyache" peaked at number 66 on the ARIA Singles Chart. It was also awarded a 6× platinum certification by the Australian Recording Industry Association (ARIA) for selling 420,000 track-equivalent units in the country.

In the United Kingdom, the track peaked at number 79 on the UK Singles Chart. It was awarded a gold certification by the British Phonographic Industry (BPI) for selling 400,000 track-equivalent units in the UK. In Canada, the song peaked at number 65 on the Canadian Hot 100 and was awarded a platinum certification by Music Canada (MC) for selling 80,000 track-equivalent units in the country.

== Music video ==
Eilish pulls a red wagon down an empty road in the music video.

An accompanying music video was uploaded to Eilish's YouTube channel on March 22, 2017, and was directed by Miles and AJ. In it, Eilish is shown stranded in the middle of a deserted highway which is Mojave-Tropico Road in California. The sky is a shade of purplish-blue, and the sides of the pavement are marked with cacti and sand. She is dressed from head to toe in a yellow ensemble. The video begins with Eilish walking down a long, empty desert road, dragging a red wagon filled with garbage bags, which she eventually reveals to be full of cash. Eilish starts to recount the bad things she has done, "Where's my mind?" she wonders, before forgetting about it: "Maybe it's in the gutter, where I left my lover". Throughout the video, Eilish throws dollar bills in the air and dances along the highway.

The music video was positively received by critics. De Elizbeth of Teen Vogue said the video "definitely invokes feelings of summertime", and that it will "make you want to find your best romper and sunnies and be outside". Ian David Monroe, writing for V magazine, described the visual as "a little silly", but said it was "seriously well-produced". Writing for Nylon magazine, Sydney Gore compared Eilish's look in the visual to that of Uma Thurman in the 2003 American film Kill Bill. Gore also praised the choreography, saying that "we're experiencing hallucinations as we watch her bust out some sick down the road which leads to the great unknown". Jacob Moore of Complex magazine labeled the video as "bright", "mischievous" and "captivating".

Nate D. Sanders auctioned a yellow rain suit and jacket nearly identical to the outfit worn by Eilish in the music video for 12,000 dollars in February 2020. Instead of an "X" on the front of the outfit, Eilish's full name is signed in block letters on the right shoulder and her last name is written in cursive across the front of the overalls. The listing stated: "Outfit was worn by Eilish on several occasions according to the accompanying COA from MusiCares charity. A quintessential example of Billie Eilish's personal style, worn and signed by the 5-time Grammy Award winner."

== Live performances and other usage ==
Eilish performed "Bellyache" live during her North American 1 by 1 tour in 2018. In February 2018, Eilish and Finneas performed an acoustic version of the song for Triple J. In March 2018, Eilish performed the track on The Tonight Show Starring Jimmy Fallon. In November of the same year, Eilish performed the song for Vevo Lift. She sang it at the Coachella Valley Music and Arts Festival in April 2019, and at the Glastonbury Festival in June of that year. Eilish released an acoustic version of "Bellyache" as part of her live album Live at Third Man Records on December 6, 2019. In December 2019, Eilish performed "Bellyache" at the Steve Jobs Theater for the first annual Apple Music Awards after she won artist of the year, with O'Connell playing the piano. "Bellyache" was also included on the setlists of Eilish's When We All Fall Asleep Tour (2019) and her Where Do We Go? World Tour (2020).

In May 2019, Norwegian singer Sigrid covered "Bellyache" for Sveriges Radio's P3 session. Tom Skinner of NME described the cover as "stripped back" and noted that it features Sigrid with an "acoustic guitar and backing vocalist".

== Track listings ==
Digital download and streaming
No.	Title	Length
1.	"Bellyache"	2:59

Digital download – Marian Hill Remix
No.	Title	Length
1.	"Bellyache" (Marian Hill Remix)	3:41

== Personnel ==
Credits adapted from the EP's liner notes.

- Billie Eilish – vocals, songwriter
- Finneas O'Connell – songwriter, production
- John Greenham – mastering
- Rob Kinelski – mixing

== Charts ==
=== Weekly charts ===
Weekly chart performance for "Bellyache"
Chart (2018–2019)	Peak position
Australia (ARIA)	66
Canada Hot 100 (Billboard)	65
Greece (IFPI)	54
Ireland (IRMA)	39
Lithuania (AGATA)	26
Netherlands (Single Tip)	9
Portugal (AFP)	69
Scottish Singles Sales (Official Charts)	89
Slovakia Singles Digital (ČNS IFPI)	85
South Korea (Gaon)	197
Sweden Heatseeker (Sverigetopplistan)	1
UK Singles (Official Charts)	79
US Bubbling Under Hot 100 (Billboard)	3
US Alternative Digital Song Sales (Billboard)	11

=== Year-end charts ===
2019 year-end chart performance for "Bellyache"
Chart (2019)	Position
Portugal (AFP)	144
US Alternative Digital Song Sales (Billboard)	23

== Certifications ==
Certifications for "Bellyache"
Region	Certification	Certified units/sales
Australia (ARIA)	6× Platinum	420,000^{‡}
Austria (IFPI Austria)	Platinum	30,000^{‡}
Brazil (Pro-Música Brasil)	2× Platinum	120,000^{‡}
Canada (Music Canada)	7× Platinum	560,000^{‡}
Denmark (IFPI Danmark)	Platinum	90,000^{‡}
France (SNEP)	Platinum	200,000^{‡}
Germany (BVMI)	Gold	200,000^{‡}
Italy (FIMI)	Gold	35,000^{‡}
Mexico (AMPROFON)	2× Platinum	120,000^{‡}
New Zealand (RMNZ)	4× Platinum	120,000^{‡}
Poland (ZPAV)	2× Platinum	40,000^{‡}
Portugal (AFP)	Platinum	10,000^{‡}
Spain (Promusicae)	Platinum	60,000^{‡}
United Kingdom (BPI)	Platinum	600,000^{‡}
United States (RIAA)	2× Platinum	2,000,000^{‡}
^{‡} Sales+streaming figures based on certification alone.
