= Billie Eilish discography =

Discography of American singer-songwriter

- Eilish performing at the O2 Arena during Hit Me Hard and Soft: The Tour in 2025
- Studio albums: 3
- EPs: 2
- Live albums: 2
- Singles: 35
- Video albums: 1
- Music videos: 32
- Promotional singles: 4

American singer-songwriter Billie Eilish has released 3 studio albums, 2 live albums, 1 video album, 2 extended plays (EPs), 35 singles, 4 promotional singles, and 32 music videos. According to the Recording Industry Association of America (RIAA), she has sold 45.5 million digital singles and 5 million albums. The International Federation of the Phonographic Industry (IFPI) crowned "Bad Guy" as 2019's biggest selling single globally, selling 19.5 million units in a year span. Brittany Spanos of Rolling Stone regarded Eilish as "the queen of Gen-Z pop". At age 17, she became the youngest female artist in United Kingdom chart history to score a number-one album. As of October 2021, Eilish has accumulated 76.7 billion career streams worldwide. According to the IFPI, Eilish was the fourth-best-selling artist of 2019 and the fifth-best-selling artist of 2020.

In August 2017, Eilish released her first EP, Don't Smile at Me, which reached number 14 on the US Billboard 200, number 12 on the UK Albums Chart, and the top 10 in Australia, New Zealand, and Sweden. Eilish then released the internationally charting singles such as "Lovely" (with Khalid), "You Should See Me in a Crown", "When the Party's Over", "Come Out and Play", "Bury a Friend", "Wish You Were Gay", "Bad Guy", "Everything I Wanted", "My Future", and "Therefore I Am".

Her debut studio album, When We All Fall Asleep, Where Do We Go? was released on March 29, 2019, and peaked at number one in 15 countries including the United States, the United Kingdom, Australia, and Canada. It sold 1.2 million units globally in 2019, making it the fifth-biggest seller of the year. "Bad Guy" became Eilish's first top-10 single on the US Billboard Hot 100, later peaking at number one. With "Bad Guy", she became the first artist born in the 21st century and the third Gen Z artist to have a number-one song on the Hot 100, as well as the first to have a number-one album on the Billboard 200. Eilish also broke the record for the most simultaneous Hot 100 hits among women.

Eilish's second studio album, Happier Than Ever, was released on July 30, 2021, and peaked at number one in several countries including the United States, the United Kingdom, Australia, and Canada. On July 21, 2022, she surprise-released her second EP, Guitar Songs, which consists of two tracks, "TV" and "The 30th". Her third studio album, Hit Me Hard and Soft, was released on May 17, 2024, and peaked at number two in the US.

== Albums ==
=== Studio albums ===
Title	Details	Peak chart positions										Units	Certifications
Title	Details	US	AUS	AUT	CAN	DEN	NLD	NOR	NZ	SWE	UK	Units	Certifications
When We All Fall Asleep, Where Do We Go?	Released: March 29, 2019; Label: Darkroom, Interscope; Format: CD, cassette, digital download, streaming, vinyl, box set	1	1	1	1	1	1	1	1	1	1	CAN: 91,000 (Note: During 2019, the album sold 69,000 pure copies, while during 2020 it sold 22,000.); FRA: 93,453; UK: 923,589	RIAA: 4× Platinum; ARIA: 5× Platinum; BPI: 3× Platinum; IFPI AUT: 4× Platinum; IFPI DEN: 7× Platinum; IFPI NOR: 7× Platinum; MC: 7× Platinum; RMNZ: 7× Platinum
Happier Than Ever	Released: July 30, 2021; Label: Darkroom, Interscope; Format: CD, cassette, digital download, streaming, vinyl, box set	1	1	1	1	1	1	1	1	1	1	CAN: 18,000; UK: 346,911	ARIA: 2× Platinum; BPI: Platinum; IFPI AUT: 2× Platinum; IFPI DEN: 3× Platinum; MC: 4× Platinum; RMNZ: 3× Platinum
Hit Me Hard and Soft	Released: May 17, 2024; Label: Darkroom, Interscope; Format: CD, cassette, digital download, streaming, vinyl, box set	2	1	1	1	1	1	1	1	1	1	CAN: 224,000; FRA: 172,965; UK: 310,269	RIAA: 2× Platinum; ARIA: 2× Platinum; BPI: 2× Platinum; GLF: 2× Platinum; IFPI AUT: Platinum; IFPI DEN: 4× Platinum; MC: 4× Platinum; NVPI: Platinum; RMNZ: 4× Platinum

=== Live albums ===
Title	Details	Peak chart positions					
Title	Details	US	AUS	DEN	NLD	SWE	UK
Live at Third Man Records	Released: December 6, 2019; Label: Darkroom, Interscope, Third Man; Format: Vinyl	55	—	—	—	—	—
Hit Me Hard and Soft: The Tour (Live)	Released: May 1, 2026; Label: Darkroom, Interscope; Format: Vinyl	—	8	7	1	19	29

== Extended plays ==
Title	Details	Peak chart positions										Units	Certifications
Title	Details	US	AUS	AUT	CAN	DEN	NLD	NOR	NZ	SWE	UK	Units	Certifications
Don't Smile at Me	Released: August 11, 2017; Label: Darkroom, Interscope; Format: CD, digital download, cassette, streaming, vinyl	14	6	23	10	11	10	6	3	4	12	UK: 654,788	RIAA: Platinum; ARIA: 3× Platinum; BPI: 2× Platinum; IFPI AUT: Platinum; IFPI DEN: 3× Platinum; MC: 4× Platinum; RMNZ: 5× Platinum
Guitar Songs	Released: July 21, 2022; Label: Darkroom, Interscope; Format: Digital download, streaming	—	—	—	—	—	—	—	—	—	—		
"—" denotes a recording that did not chart.

=== Live extended plays ===
Title	Details	Peak chart position		
Title	Details	US	DEN	UK Vinyl
Up Next Session: Billie Eilish	Released: September 20, 2017; Label: Darkroom, Interscope; Format: Digital download, streaming	—	—	—
Billie Eilish Live at the Steve Jobs Theater	Released: December 19, 2019; Label: Darkroom, Interscope; Format: Digital download, streaming	—	—	—
Prime Day Show x Billie Eilish	Released: June 16, 2021; Label: Darkroom, Interscope; Format: Digital download, streaming	87	—	—
Apple Music Live: Billie Eilish	Released: October 1, 2022; Label: Darkroom, Interscope; Format: Digital download, streaming	—	—	—
Billie Eilish: Artist of the Year 2024 Live	Released: December 17, 2024; Label: Darkroom, Interscope; Format: Digital download, streaming	—	—	—
Live	Release: November 28, 2025; Label: Darkroom, Interscope; Format: Vinyl	163	36	2 (Note: Credited just to "Skinny".)
"—" denotes a recording that did not chart.

== Singles ==
=== As lead artist ===
Title	Year	Peak chart positions										Certifications	Album
Title	Year	US	AUS	AUT	CAN	DEN	NLD	NOR	NZ	SWE	UK	Certifications	Album
"Ocean Eyes"	2016	84	58	—	68	—	52	73	38	88	60	RIAA: 8× Platinum; ARIA: 10× Platinum; BPI: 3× Platinum; IFPI AUT: 2× Platinum; IFPI DEN: 5× Platinum; MC: Diamond; RMNZ: 8× Platinum	Everything, Everything (Original Motion Picture Soundtrack) and Don't Smile at Me
"Six Feet Under"	2016	—	—	—	—	—	—	—	—	—	—	RIAA: Gold; ARIA: 2× Platinum; BPI: Gold; IFPI AUT: Gold; IFPI DEN: Gold; MC: 2× Platinum; RMNZ: Platinum	Non-album single
"Bellyache"	2017	— (Note: "Bellyache" did not enter the Billboard Hot 100, but peaked at number 3 on the Bubbling Under Hot 100 chart.)	66	—	65	—	— (Note: "Bellyache" did not enter the Dutch Top 100, but peaked at number 9 on the Dutch Tip Single chart.)	—	—	— (Note: "Bellyache" did not enter the Swedish Singellista Chart, but peaked at number 1 on the Swedish Heatseeker Chart.)	79	RIAA: 2× Platinum; ARIA: 6× Platinum; BPI: Platinum; IFPI AUT: Platinum; IFPI DEN: Platinum; MC: 7× Platinum; RMNZ: 4× Platinum	Don't Smile at Me
"Bored"	2017	—	53	57	—	—	—	34	—	57	— (Note: "Bored" did not enter the UK Singles Chart but peaked at number 80 on the UK Singles Streaming Chart.)	RIAA: Gold; ARIA: 3× Platinum; BPI: Platinum; IFPI AUT: Platinum; IFPI DEN: Platinum; MC: 4× Platinum; RMNZ: 2× Platinum	13 Reasons Why (A Netflix Original Series Soundtrack)
"Watch"	2017	—	—	—	—	—	—	—	—	—	—	RIAA: Platinum; ARIA: 3× Platinum; BPI: Platinum; IFPI AUT: Platinum; IFPI DEN: Gold; MC: 4× Platinum; RMNZ: 2× Platinum	Don't Smile at Me
"Copycat"	2017	— (Note: "Copycat" did not enter the Billboard Hot 100, but peaked at number 12 on the Bubbling Under Hot 100 chart.)	—	—	100	—	—	—	—	—	—	RIAA: Platinum; ARIA: 2× Platinum; BPI: Gold; IFPI AUT: Gold; IFPI DEN: Gold; MC: 4× Platinum; RMNZ: Platinum	Don't Smile at Me
"Idontwannabeyouanymore"	2017	96	—	—	60	—	— (Note: "Idontwannabeyouanymore" did not enter the Dutch Top 100, but peaked at number 14 on the Dutch Tip Single chart.)	—	—	— (Note: "Idontwannabeyouanymore" did not enter the Swedish Singellista Chart, but peaked at number 2 on the Swedish Heatseeker Chart.)	78	RIAA: 2× Platinum; ARIA: 4× Platinum; BPI: Platinum; IFPI AUT: Platinum; IFPI DEN: Platinum; MC: 6× Platinum; RMNZ: 3× Platinum	Don't Smile at Me
"My Boy"	2017	—	—	—	—	—	—	—	—	—	—	RIAA: Platinum; ARIA: 2× Platinum; BPI: Gold; IFPI AUT: Gold; IFPI DEN: Gold; MC: 3× Platinum; RMNZ: 2× Platinum	Don't Smile at Me
"&Burn" (with Vince Staples) (Note: "&Burn" was added to Don't Smile at Me in December 2017.)	2017	—	—	—	—	—	—	—	—	—	—	RIAA: Gold; ARIA: Platinum; BPI: Silver; MC: Platinum; RMNZ: Gold	Don't Smile at Me
"Bitches Broken Hearts" (Note: "Bitches Broken Hearts" is included on the expanded and Japanese limited editions of Don't Smile at Me and the Target reissue edition of When We All Fall Asleep, Where Do We Go?)	2018	—	—	—	—	—	—	—	—	—	—	RIAA: Platinum; ARIA: Platinum; BPI: Silver; IFPI DEN: Gold; MC: 2× Platinum; RMNZ: Platinum	Don't Smile at Me and When We All Fall Asleep, Where Do We Go?
"Lovely" (with Khalid) (Note: "Lovely" is included on the expanded and Japanese limited editions of Don't Smile at Me.)	2018	64	5	60	46	—	55	39	4	51	47	RIAA: Diamond; ARIA: 13× Platinum; BPI: 4× Platinum; GLF: 2× Platinum; IFPI AUT: 4× Platinum; IFPI DEN: 3× Platinum; IFPI NOR: 3× Platinum; MC: Diamond; RMNZ: 9× Platinum	13 Reasons Why: Season 2 and Don't Smile at Me
"You Should See Me in a Crown"	2018	41	16	—	27	—	59	—	— (Note: "You Should See Me in a Crown" did not enter the NZ Top 40 Singles Chart, but peaked at number 3 on the NZ Hot Singles Chart.)	43	60	RIAA: 2× Platinum; ARIA: 4× Platinum; BPI: Platinum; IFPI AUT: Platinum; IFPI DEN: Gold; MC: 6× Platinum; RMNZ: 2× Platinum	When We All Fall Asleep, Where Do We Go?
"When the Party's Over"	2018	29	7	25	14	16	34	9	3	10	21	RIAA: 4× Platinum; ARIA: 11× Platinum; BPI: 3× Platinum; GLF: 3× Platinum; IFPI AUT: 3× Platinum; IFPI DEN: 3× Platinum; IFPI NOR: 3× Platinum; MC: 9× Platinum; RMNZ: 7× Platinum	When We All Fall Asleep, Where Do We Go?
"Come Out and Play" (Note: "Come Out and Play" is included on the Japanese edition of When We All Fall Asleep, Where Do We Go?)	2018	69	23	53	36	—	77	—	17	69	47	ARIA: Platinum; BPI: Silver; MC: 2× Platinum; RMNZ: Platinum	When We All Fall Asleep, Where Do We Go?
"When I Was Older" (Note: "When I Was Older" is also included on the Japanese and Target reissue editions of When We All Fall Asleep, Where Do We Go?)	2019	—	—	—	—	—	— (Note: "When I Was Older" did not enter the Dutch Top 100, but peaked at number 9 on the Dutch Tip Single chart.)	—	— (Note: "When I Was Older" did not enter the NZ Top 40 Singles Chart, but peaked at number 7 on the NZ Hot Singles Chart.)	— (Note: "When I Was Older" did not enter the Swedish Singellista Chart, but peaked at number 3 on the Swedish Heatseeker Chart.)	—	ARIA: Gold; MC: Gold	Roma and When We All Fall Asleep, Where Do We Go?
"Bury a Friend" (Note: ”Bury a Friend” features uncredited vocals from Mehki Raine.)	2019	14	3	6	10	8	10	2	2	1	6	RIAA: 3× Platinum; ARIA: 6× Platinum; BPI: 2× Platinum; GLF: 2× Platinum; IFPI AUT: Platinum; IFPI DEN: Platinum; IFPI NOR: Platinum; MC: 8× Platinum; RMNZ: 3× Platinum	When We All Fall Asleep, Where Do We Go?
"Wish You Were Gay"	2019	31	5	16	12	12	35	14	2	13	13	RIAA: Platinum; ARIA: 3× Platinum; BPI: Platinum; GLF: Gold; IFPI AUT: Platinum; IFPI DEN: Platinum; IFPI NOR: Gold; MC: 3× Platinum; RMNZ: 3× Platinum	When We All Fall Asleep, Where Do We Go?
"Bad Guy"	2019	1	1	2	1	2	5	1	1	2	2	RIAA: Diamond; ARIA: 18× Platinum; BPI: 5× Platinum; GLF: 4× Platinum; IFPI AUT: 6× Platinum; IFPI DEN: 4× Platinum; IFPI NOR: 4× Platinum; MC: Diamond; RMNZ: 8× Platinum	When We All Fall Asleep, Where Do We Go?
"All the Good Girls Go to Hell"	2019	46	8	—	19	29	42	22	9	25	77	RIAA: Platinum; ARIA: 2× Platinum; BPI: Platinum; IFPI AUT: Platinum; IFPI DEN: Gold; MC: 4× Platinum; RMNZ: Platinum	When We All Fall Asleep, Where Do We Go?
"Everything I Wanted" (Note: "Everything I Wanted" is included on the Japanese complete edition and Target reissue of When We All Fall Asleep, Where Do We Go?)	2019	8	2	3	6	4	4	1	2	3	3	RIAA: 3× Platinum; ARIA: 8× Platinum; BPI: 3× Platinum; GLF: Platinum; IFPI AUT: 2× Platinum; IFPI DEN: 2× Platinum; IFPI NOR: 2× Platinum; MC: 7× Platinum; RMNZ: 5× Platinum	When We All Fall Asleep, Where Do We Go?
"No Time to Die"	2020	16	4	2	11	4	3	3	9	3	1	RIAA: Platinum; ARIA: 2× Platinum; BPI: 2× Platinum; IFPI AUT: Platinum; IFPI DEN: Platinum; IFPI NOR: Gold; MC: 2× Platinum; RMNZ: Platinum	No Time to Die
"Ilomilo"	2020	62	23	—	38	—	63	—	—	63	— (Note: "Ilomilo" did not enter the UK Singles Chart but peaked at number 37 on the UK Singles Streaming Chart.)	RIAA: Gold; ARIA: 2× Platinum; BPI: Gold; IFPI AUT: Gold; IFPI DEN: Gold; MC: 2× Platinum; RMNZ: Platinum	When We All Fall Asleep, Where Do We Go?
"My Future"	2020	6	3	28	9	18	30	12	4	12	7	ARIA: Platinum; BPI: Gold; IFPI AUT: Gold; IFPI DEN: Gold; MC: 2× Platinum; RMNZ: Platinum	Happier Than Ever
"Therefore I Am"	2020	2	3	2	2	3	11	2	1	4	2	ARIA: 5× Platinum; BPI: Platinum; GLF: Gold; IFPI AUT: Platinum; IFPI DEN: Platinum; MC: 5× Platinum; RMNZ: 2× Platinum	Happier Than Ever
"Lo Vas a Olvidar" (with Rosalía)	2021	62	57	37	50	—	50	22	— (Note: "Lo Vas a Olvidar" did not enter the NZ Top 40 Singles Chart, but peaked at number two on the NZ Hot Singles Chart.)	37	35		Euphoria Season 1
"Your Power"	2021	10	9	8	6	7	9	2	5	3	5	ARIA: 2× Platinum; BPI: Gold; IFPI AUT: Gold; IFPI DEN: Gold; MC: 2× Platinum; RMNZ: Platinum	Happier Than Ever
"Lost Cause"	2021	27	18	24	16	35	48	23	15	25	14	ARIA: Platinum; BPI: Silver; MC: Platinum; RMNZ: Platinum	Happier Than Ever
"NDA"	2021	39	16	31	18	—	55	16	14	25	23	ARIA: Platinum; IFPI AUT: Gold; BPI: Silver; MC: 2× Platinum; RMNZ: Platinum	Happier Than Ever
"Happier Than Ever"	2021	11	3	12	6	11	15	5	4	13	4	ARIA: 5× Platinum; BPI: 2× Platinum; GLF: Gold; IFPI AUT: 2× Platinum; IFPI DEN: Platinum; MC: 6× Platinum; RMNZ: 5× Platinum	Happier Than Ever
"Male Fantasy"	2021	— (Note: "Male Fantasy" did not enter the Billboard Hot 100, but peaked at number two on the Bubbling Under Hot 100 chart.)	59	—	62	—	—	—	—	— (Note: "Male Fantasy" did not enter the Swedish Singellista Chart, but peaked at number nine on the Swedish Heatseeker Chart.)	— (Note: "Male Fantasy" did not enter the UK Singles Chart but peaked at number 91 on the UK Singles Streaming Chart.)	ARIA: Platinum; BPI: Silver; MC: Platinum; RMNZ: Gold	Happier Than Ever
"What Was I Made For?"	2023	14	1	3	10	13	5	4	2	5	1	RIAA: Platinum; ARIA: 4× Platinum; BPI: 2× Platinum; GLF: Platinum; IFPI AUT: Platinum; IFPI DEN: Platinum; MC: 6× Platinum; RMNZ: 3× Platinum	Barbie the Album
"Lunch"	2024	5	5	2	7	6	4	4	2	4	2	RIAA: Platinum; ARIA: 3× Platinum; BPI: Platinum; IFPI AUT: Gold; IFPI DEN: Gold; MC: 3× Platinum; RMNZ: 2× Platinum	Hit Me Hard and Soft
"Birds of a Feather"	2024	2	1	3	3	7	4	4	1	5	2	RIAA: 5× Platinum; ARIA: 10× Platinum; BPI: 4× Platinum; IFPI AUT: 2× Platinum; IFPI DEN: 3× Platinum; MC: 8× Platinum; RMNZ: 7× Platinum	Hit Me Hard and Soft
"Chihiro"	2025	12	7	3	12	12	10	7	6	23	7	RIAA: Platinum; ARIA: 2× Platinum; BPI: Platinum; IFPI AUT: Platinum; IFPI DEN: Platinum; MC: 3× Platinum; RMNZ: 2× Platinum	Hit Me Hard and Soft
"Wildflower"	2025	17	14	24	20	30	22	19	11	34	7	RIAA: 4× Platinum; ARIA: 5× Platinum; BPI: 2× Platinum; IFPI AUT: Platinum; IFPI DEN: Platinum; MC: 5× Platinum; RMNZ: 4× Platinum	Hit Me Hard and Soft
"—" denotes a single that did not chart.

=== As featured artist ===
Title	Year	Peak chart positions										Certifications	Album
Title	Year	US	AUS	CAN	GER	NLD	NOR	NZ	SWE	UK	WW	Certifications	Album
"Guess" (Charli XCX featuring Billie Eilish)	2024	12	1	9	14	14	9	1	7	1	3	ARIA: Platinum; BPI: Platinum; RMNZ: Gold	Brat and It's Completely Different but Also Still Brat

=== Promotional singles ===
Title	Year	Peak chart positions										Certifications	Album
Title	Year	US	AUS	BRA	CAN	DEN	NOR	NZ	SWE	UK	WW	Certifications	Album
"Party Favor"	2018	—	—	—	—	—	—	—	—	— (Note: "Party Favor" did not enter the UK Singles Chart, but peaked at number 18 on the UK Physical Singles Chart and number 14 on the UK Vinyl Singles Chart.)	—	RIAA: Gold; ARIA: Platinum; BPI: Silver; MC: Platinum; RMNZ: Gold	Don't Smile at Me
"Hotline (Edit)"	2023	—	—	—	—	—	—	33	—	69	—	ARIA: Platinum; BPI: Silver; RMNZ: Gold	Non-album promotional single
"L'Amour de Ma Vie"	2024	22	15	61	21	38	40	15	72	96	17	RIAA: Platinum; ARIA: Platinum; BPI: Gold; IFPI DEN: Gold; MC: 2× Platinum; RMNZ: Platinum	Hit Me Hard and Soft
"Intro (Hit Me Hard and Soft Tour)"	2026	—	—	—	—	—	—	— (Note: "Intro (Hit Me Hard and Soft Tour)" did not enter the NZ Top 40 Singles Chart, but peaked at number 37 on the NZ Hot 40 Singles Chart.)	—	—	—		Non-album promotional single
"—" denotes a promotional single that did not chart.

== Other charted and certified songs ==
Title	Year	Peak chart positions										Certifications	Album
Title	Year	US	AUS	CAN	GER	ITA	NLD	NOR	NZ	SWE	UK	Certifications	Album
"Hostage"	2017	—	—	—	—	—	—	—	—	—	—	RIAA: Platinum; ARIA: 2× Platinum; BPI: Gold; MC: 2× Platinum; RMNZ: Platinum	Don't Smile at Me
"!!!!!!!"	2019	—	—	79	—	—	—	—	—	—	—		When We All Fall Asleep, Where Do We Go?
"Xanny"	2019	35	10	26	78	91	48	35	22	32	— (Note: "Xanny" did not enter the UK Singles Chart but peaked at number 21 on the UK Singles Streaming Chart.)	RIAA: Platinum; ARIA: 2× Platinum; BPI: Silver; MC: 2× Platinum; RMNZ: Platinum	When We All Fall Asleep, Where Do We Go?
"8"	2019	79	35	52	—	—	83	—	—	77	— (Note: "8" did not enter the UK Singles Chart but peaked at number 47 on the UK Singles Streaming Chart.)	RIAA: Gold; ARIA: Platinum; BPI: Silver; MC: Platinum; RMNZ: Platinum	When We All Fall Asleep, Where Do We Go?
"My Strange Addiction"	2019	43	12	21	86	100	51	39	21	46	— (Note: "My Strange Addiction" did not enter the UK Singles Chart but peaked at number 24 on the UK Singles Streaming Chart, and number 75 on the UK Singles Sales Chart and the UK Singles Download Chart.)	RIAA: Platinum; ARIA: 2× Platinum; BPI: Gold; MC: 2× Platinum; RMNZ: Platinum	When We All Fall Asleep, Where Do We Go?
"Listen Before I Go"	2019	63	29	42	—	—	73	—	—	71	— (Note: "Listen Before I Go" did not enter the UK Singles Chart but peaked at number 43 on the UK Singles Streaming Chart, number 82 on the UK Singles Sales Chart and number 72 the UK Singles Download Chart.)	RIAA: Gold; ARIA: 2× Platinum; BPI: Gold; MC: 2× Platinum; RMNZ: 2× Platinum	When We All Fall Asleep, Where Do We Go?
"I Love You"	2019	53	20	35	—	—	61	38	39	47	— (Note: "I Love You" did not enter the UK Singles Chart but peaked at number 40 on the UK Singles Streaming Chart.)	RIAA: Platinum; ARIA: 4× Platinum; BPI: Platinum; FIMI: Gold; IFPI NOR: Gold; MC: 5× Platinum; RMNZ: 3× Platinum	When We All Fall Asleep, Where Do We Go?
"Goodbye"	2019	— (Note: "Goodbye" did not enter the Billboard Hot 100, but peaked at number 4 on the Bubbling Under Hot 100 chart.)	—	69	—	—	—	—	—	— (Note: "Goodbye" did not enter the Swedish Singellista Chart, but peaked at number 2 on the Swedish Heatseeker Chart.)	— (Note: "Goodbye" did not enter the UK Singles Chart but peaked at number 76 on the UK Singles Streaming Chart.)	ARIA: Gold; BPI: Silver; MC: Platinum; RMNZ: Gold	When We All Fall Asleep, Where Do We Go?
"Getting Older"	2021	69	35	41	—	—	60	—	32	64	28	ARIA: Platinum; BPI: Silver; MC: Gold; RMNZ: Gold	Happier Than Ever
"I Didn't Change My Number"	2021	80	45	52	—	—	64	—	—	82	— (Note: "I Didn't Change My Number" did not enter the UK Singles Chart but peaked at number 67 on the UK Singles Streaming Chart.)	ARIA: Platinum; BPI: Silver; MC: Platinum; RMNZ: Gold	Happier Than Ever
"Billie Bossa Nova"	2021	70	40	46	—	—	—	—	— (Note: "Billie Bossa Nova" did not enter the NZ Top 40 Singles Chart, but peaked at number six on the NZ Hot Singles Chart.)	98	— (Note: "Billie Bossa Nova" did not enter the UK Singles Chart but peaked at number 58 on the UK Singles Streaming Chart, number 79 on the UK Singles Sales Chart and number 77 the UK Singles Download Chart.)	ARIA: Platinum; BPI: Silver; MC: Platinum; RMNZ: Platinum	Happier Than Ever
"Oxytocin"	2021	72	38	47	—	—	—	33	—	52	32	ARIA: Gold; BPI: Silver; MC: Platinum; RMNZ: Gold	Happier Than Ever
"Goldwing"	2021	— (Note: "Goldwing" did not enter the Billboard Hot 100, but peaked at number three on the Bubbling Under Hot 100 chart.)	69	72	—	—	—	—	—	— (Note: "Goldwing" did not enter the Swedish Singellista Chart, but peaked at number seven on the Swedish Heatseeker Chart.)	— (Note: "Goldwing" did not enter the UK Singles Chart but peaked at number 93 on the UK Singles Streaming Chart.)	MC: Gold	Happier Than Ever
"Halley's Comet"	2021	90	58	59	—	—	—	—	—	70	— (Note: "Halley's Comet" did not enter the UK Singles Chart but peaked at number 80 on the UK Singles Streaming Chart.)	ARIA: Gold; BPI: Silver; MC: Platinum; RMNZ: Platinum	Happier Than Ever
"Not My Responsibility"	2021	— (Note: "Not My Responsibility" did not enter the Billboard Hot 100, but peaked at number 20 on the Bubbling Under Hot 100 chart.)	99	98	—	—	—	—	—	—	—	ARIA: Gold; MC: Gold	Happier Than Ever
"OverHeated"	2021	— (Note: "OverHeated" did not enter the Billboard Hot 100, but peaked at number nine on the Bubbling Under Hot 100 chart.)	84	85	—	—	—	—	—	—	—	ARIA: Gold; MC: Gold	Happier Than Ever
"Everybody Dies"	2021	— (Note: "Everybody Dies" did not enter the Billboard Hot 100, but peaked at number 14 on the Bubbling Under Hot 100 chart.)	90	90	—	—	—	—	—	—	—	ARIA: Gold; MC: Gold	Happier Than Ever
"TV"	2022	52	23	30	81	—	78	33	17	22	23	ARIA: Platinum; BPI: Platinum; MC: 3× Platinum; RMNZ: 2× Platinum	Guitar Songs
"The 30th"	2022	79	31	48	—	—	100	—	22	— (Note: "The 30th" did not enter the Swedish Singellista Chart, but peaked at number three on the Swedish Heatseeker Chart.)	33	ARIA: Platinum; BPI: Silver; MC: Platinum; RMNZ: Gold	Guitar Songs
"Skinny"	2024	18	13	22	—	—	—	26	10	56	— (Note: "Skinny" did not enter the UK Singles Chart, but peaked at number 18 on the UK Streaming Chart and the Billboard U.K. Songs chart.)	RIAA: Gold; ARIA: Platinum; BPI: Silver; MC: 2× Platinum; RMNZ: Platinum	Hit Me Hard and Soft
"The Greatest"	2024	24	18	27	—	—	—	38	16	76	69	RIAA: Platinum; ARIA: Platinum; BPI: Gold; MC: 2× Platinum; RMNZ: Platinum	Hit Me Hard and Soft
"The Diner"	2024	31	22	32	—	—	—	—	19	100	— (Note: "The Diner" did not enter the UK Singles Chart, but peaked at number 28 on the UK Streaming Chart.)	RIAA: Gold; ARIA: Gold; BPI: Silver; MC: Platinum; RMNZ: Gold	Hit Me Hard and Soft
"Bittersuite"	2024	36	23	34	—	—	—	—	20	— (Note: "Bittersuite" did not enter the Swedish Singellista Chart, but peaked at number one on the Swedish Heatseeker Chart.)	— (Note: "Bittersuite" did not enter the UK Singles Chart, but peaked at number 30 on the UK Streaming Chart.)	RIAA: Gold; ARIA: Gold; BPI: Silver; MC: Platinum; RMNZ: Gold	Hit Me Hard and Soft
"Blue"	2024	25	20	23	57	—	—	21	13	54	— (Note: "Blue" did not enter the UK Singles Chart, but peaked at number 21 on the UK Streaming Chart, number 69 on the UK Singles Sales Chart, number 68 on the UK Singles Download Chart and number 21 on the Billboard U.K. Songs chart.)	RIAA: Gold; ARIA: Platinum; BPI: Silver; MC: Platinum; RMNZ: Platinum	Hit Me Hard and Soft
"—" denotes a recording that did not chart.

== Guest appearances ==
Title	Year	Other artist(s)	Album
"Sirens"	2018	Denzel Curry, JID	Ta13oo
"Sunny"	2020	Finneas O'Connell	One World: Together at Home
"Never Felt So Alone"	2023	Labrinth	Ends & Begins
"Soft Kissing Hour" (Note: Also credited as producer)	2024	Nat & Alex Wolff	Non-album single

== Videography ==
=== Video albums ===
Title	Details
Live at the Steve Jobs Theater	Released: December 4, 2019 (live stream) / December 19, 2019 (download); Label: Apple Music, Darkroom, Interscope; Format: Digital download, streaming

=== Music videos ===
List of music videos, showing year released and directors
Title	Year	Other artist(s)	Version	Director(s)	Ref.
As lead artist
"Ocean Eyes"	2016	None	Original	Megan Thompson	
"Six Feet Under"	2016	None	Original	Billie Eilish	
"Ocean Eyes"	2016	None	Dance performance	WeWrkWknds	
"Bellyache"	2017	None	Original	Miles and AJ	
"Bored"	2017	None	Original	Billie Eilish	
"Watch"	2017	None	Original	Megan Park	
"Idontwannabeyouanymore"	2018	None	Vertical	Eli Born	
"Lovely"	2018	Khalid	Original	Taylor Cohen, Matty Peacock	
"Hostage"	2018	None	Original	Henry Scholfield	
"You Should See Me in a Crown"	2018	None	Vertical	Billie Eilish	
"When the Party's Over"	2018	None	Original	Carlos López Estrada	
"Bury a Friend"	2019	None	Original	Michael Chaves	
"Bad Guy" (Note: The music video for "Bad Guy" also features the song "!!!!!!!".)	2019	None	Original	Dave Meyers	
"You Should See Me in a Crown"	2019	None	Original	Takashi Murakami	
"Bad Guy"	2019	None	Vertical	Dave Meyers	
"All the Good Girls Go to Hell"	2019	None	Original	Rich Lee	
"Xanny"	2019	None	Original	Billie Eilish	
"Everything I Wanted"	2020	None	Original	Billie Eilish	
"My Future"	2020	None	Original	Andrew Onorato	
"No Time to Die"	2020	None	Original	Daniel Kleinman	
"Therefore I Am"	2020	None	Original	Billie Eilish	
"Lo Vas a Olvidar"	2021	Rosalía	Original	Nabil	
"Your Power"	2021	None	Original	Billie Eilish	
"Lost Cause"	2021	None	Original	Billie Eilish	
"NDA"	2021	None	Original	Billie Eilish	
"Happier Than Ever"	2021	None	Original	Billie Eilish	
"Male Fantasy"	2021	None	Original	Billie Eilish	
"What Was I Made For?"	2023	None	Original	Billie Eilish	
"Lunch"	2024	None	Original	Billie Eilish	
"Chihiro"	2024	None	Original	Billie Eilish	
"Birds of a Feather"	2024	None	Original	Aidan Zamiri	
As a featured artist
"Never Felt So Alone"	2023	Labrinth	Original	Daniel Sannwald	
"Guess"	2024	Charli xcx	Original	Aidan Zamiri	
