= Hit Me Hard and Soft: The Tour (Live) =

Live album by Billie Eilish
- Released: May 1, 2026
- Recorded: July 19 – 23, 2025
- Venues: Co-op Live, Manchester, UK
- Labels: Darkroom; Interscope

Billie Eilish chronology
Hit Me Hard and Soft (2024)	Hit Me Hard and Soft: The Tour (Live) (2026)

Hit Me Hard and Soft: The Tour (Live) (stylized in all caps) is the second live album by American singer-songwriter Billie Eilish, released on May 1, 2026, through Darkroom and Interscope Records. It was recorded in Manchester during Hit Me Hard and Soft: The Tour (2024–2025) and mastered at Sterling Sound Pasadena, California.

== Release and packaging ==
On May 1, 2026, the live album became available exclusively as a one-time pressing on 100% recycled vinyl, uniquely colored with a lenticular insert. Recorded during the tour's Manchester shows in July 2025, it features the songs from the film Billie Eilish – Hit Me Hard and Soft: The Tour (Live in 3D). The opening track, "Intro", was digitally released on April 24, 2026.

== Track listing ==
All tracks are written by Billie Eilish O'Connell and Finneas O'Connell.

=== Disc 1 ===
No.	Title	Length
1.	"Intro"
2.	"Chihiro"
3.	"Lunch"
4.	"NDA" / "Therefore I Am"
5.	"Wildflower"
6.	"When the Party's Over"
7.	"The Diner"
8.	"Ilomilo"
9.	"Bad Guy"

=== Disc 2 ===
No.	Title	Length
10.	"The Greatest"
11.	"Your Power"
12.	"Skinny"
13.	"TV"
14.	"Bittersuite"
15.	"Bury a Friend"
16.	"Oxytocin"
17.	"Guess"
18.	"Everything I Wanted"
19.	"Blue"
20.	"Lovely"

=== Disc 3 ===
No.	Title	Length
21.	"Idontwannabeyouanymore"
22.	"Ocean Eyes"
23.	"L'Amour de Ma Vie" / "Over Now"
24.	"What Was I Made For?"
25.	"Happier Than Ever"
26.	"Birds of a Feather"
27.	"Blue Outro"

=== Notes ===
- All tracks are stylized in all caps.
- On digital editions, all tracks are subtitled "The Tour (Live) Version".
- Tracks 21, 22, and 26 feature guest appearances by Finneas.

== Personnel ==
- Ruairi O'Flaherty – mastering
- Aron Forbes – mixing, music director
- Derek Renfroe – mixing
- Billie Eilish – vocals, piano, acoustic guitar, electric guitar
- Finneas – vocals, piano, acoustic guitar, electric guitar

== Charts ==
Chart performance for Hit Me Hard and Soft: The Tour (Live)
Chart (2026)	Peak position
Australian Albums (ARIA)	8
Belgian Albums (Ultratop Flanders)	2
Belgian Albums (Ultratop Wallonia)	3
Danish Albums (Hitlisten)	7
Dutch Albums (Album Top 100)	1
Finnish Physical Albums (Suomen virallinen lista)	5
French Albums (SNEP)	14
Greek Albums (IFPI)	62
Hungarian Physical Albums (MAHASZ)	27
Italian Albums (FIMI)	40
Japanese Western Albums (Oricon)	12
Polish Albums (ZPAV)	1
Portuguese Albums (AFP)	68
Scottish Albums (Official Charts)	6
Spanish Albums (Promusicae)	25
Swedish Albums (Sverigetopplistan)	19
UK Albums (Official Charts)	29
US Top Album Sales (Billboard)	9

== Certifications ==
Certifications
Region	Certification	Certified units/sales
Switzerland (IFPI Switzerland)	2× Platinum	40,000^{‡}
^{‡} Sales+streaming figures based on certification alone.

== Release history ==
Release date and format for Hit Me Hard and Soft: The Tour (Live)
Region	Date	Format	Label	Ref.
Various	May 1, 2026	Vinyl LP	Darkroom; Interscope	

== See also ==
- List of number-one albums of 2026 (Poland)
