= List of Billboard Global 200 top-ten singles in 2024 =

This is a list of singles that charted in the top ten of the Billboard Global 200, an all-genre singles chart, in 2024.

== Top-ten singles ==
Key

- ↑ – indicates single's top 10 entry was also its Global 200 debut

List of Billboard Global 200 top ten singles that peaked in 2024
Top ten entry date	Single	Artist(s)	Peak	Peak date	Weeks in top ten	Ref.
Singles from 2023
November 25	"Lovin on Me"^{[A]}^{[E]} ↑	Jack Harlow	1	January 13	14	
Singles from 2024
January 13	"La Diabla"	Xavi	3	January 20	9	
January 13	"Bellakeo"	Peso Pluma and Anitta	7	January 13	2	
January 13	"Stick Season"	Noah Kahan	5	January 20	10	
January 20	"Lose Control"^{[B]}^{[N]}^{[P]}	Teddy Swims	4	February 17	29	
January 20	"One of the Girls"	The Weeknd, Jennie and Lily-Rose Depp	10	January 20	1	
January 27	"Yes, And?"^{[D]}^{[G]} ↑	Ariana Grande	1	January 27	6	
January 27	"Redrum"^{[F]} ↑	21 Savage	5	January 27	5	
January 27	"Nee-Nah" ↑	21 Savage, Travis Scott and Metro Boomin	8	January 27	1	
January 27	"Igual que un Ángel" ↑	Kali Uchis and Peso Pluma	9	January 27	2	
January 27	"La Victima"	Xavi	10	January 27	1	
February 3	"Murder on the Dancefloor"	Sophie Ellis-Bextor	10	February 3	1	
February 10	"Hiss" ↑	Megan Thee Stallion	1	February 10	1	
February 10	"Beautiful Things"^{[H]}^{[O]}	Benson Boone	1	February 17	58	
February 24	"Carnival" ↑	Y$: Kanye West and Ty Dolla Sign featuring Rich the Kid and Playboi Carti	2	February 24	7	
February 24	"Texas Hold 'Em" ↑	Beyoncé	1	March 2	9	
March 2	"Training Season" ↑	Dua Lipa	6	March 2	1	
March 9	"Saturn" ↑	SZA	5	March 9	1	
March 23	"We Can't Be Friends (Wait for Your Love)" ↑	Ariana Grande	1	March 23	6	
March 23	"Bling-Bang-Bang-Born"	Creepy Nuts	8	March 23	2	
March 30	"Fri(end)s" ↑	V	5	March 30	1	
April 6	"Like That" ↑	Future, Metro Boomin and Kendrick Lamar	1	April 6	4	
April 6	"Type Shit" ↑	Future, Metro Boomin, Travis Scott and Playboi Carti	6	April 6	1	
April 6	"Too Sweet"^{[H]}^{[K]} ↑	Hozier	1	April 27	14	
April 6	"Cinderella" ↑	Future, Metro Boomin and Travis Scott	8	April 6	1	
April 13	"I Like the Way You Kiss Me"	Artemas	2	April 27	7	
April 13	"Magnetic"	Illit	6	April 20	3	
April 13	"II Most Wanted" ↑	Beyoncé and Miley Cyrus	10	April 13	1	
April 20	"Gata Only"^{[H]}^{[I]}	FloyyMenor and Cris MJ	4	April 27	12	
April 27	"Espresso"^{[H]} ↑	Sabrina Carpenter	1	June 22	33	
May 4	"Fortnight" ↑	Taylor Swift featuring Post Malone	1	May 4	4	
May 4	"Down Bad" ↑	Taylor Swift	2	May 4	2	
May 4	"The Tortured Poets Department" ↑	Taylor Swift	3	May 4	1	
May 4	"So Long, London" ↑	Taylor Swift	4	May 4	1	
May 4	"I Can Do It with a Broken Heart" ↑	Taylor Swift	5	May 4	2	
May 4	"My Boy Only Breaks His Favorite Toys" ↑	Taylor Swift	6	May 4	1	
May 4	"But Daddy I Love Him" ↑	Taylor Swift	7	May 4	1	
May 4	"Florida!!!" ↑	Taylor Swift featuring Florence + the Machine	8	May 4	1	
May 4	"Who's Afraid of Little Old Me?" ↑	Taylor Swift	9	May 4	1	
May 11	"A Bar Song (Tipsy)"	Shaboozey	3	July 6	25	
May 11	"Million Dollar Baby" ↑	Tommy Richman	1	June 1	12	
May 18	"Not Like Us"^{[J]} ↑	Kendrick Lamar	1	May 18	22	
May 18	"Euphoria"	Kendrick Lamar	4	May 18	1	
May 25	"I Had Some Help"^{[M]} ↑	Post Malone featuring Morgan Wallen	1	May 25	13	
June 1	"Lunch" ↑	Billie Eilish	4	June 1	3	
June 1	"Chihiro" ↑	Billie Eilish	6	June 1	2	
June 1	"Birds of a Feather" ↑	Billie Eilish	1	August 17	58	
June 15	"Houdini"^{[L]} ↑	Eminem	1	June 15	4	
June 22	"Please Please Please" ↑	Sabrina Carpenter	1	June 29	18	
July 13	"Rockstar" ↑	Lisa	4	July 13	1	
August 3	"Who" ↑	Jimin	1	August 3	6	
August 3	"Chk Chk Boom" ↑	Stray Kids	10	August 3	1	
August 10	"Si Antes Te Hubiera Conocido"	Karol G	5	August 24	12	
August 10	"Good Luck, Babe!"^{[P]}	Chappell Roan	5	September 28	14	
August 17	"Guess" ↑	Charli XCX featuring Billie Eilish	3	August 17	1	
August 24	"Big Dawgs"	Hanumankind and Kalmi	9	August 24	1	
August 31	"Die with a Smile" ↑	Lady Gaga and Bruno Mars	1	September 7	62	
September 7	"Taste" ↑	Sabrina Carpenter	2	September 7	13	
September 21	"The Emptiness Machine" ↑	Linkin Park	3	September 21	3	
September 28	"Dancing in the Flames" ↑	The Weeknd	10	September 28	1	
October 12	"Timeless" ↑	The Weeknd and Playboi Carti	3	October 12	5	
October 26	"Mantra" ↑	Jennie	3	October 26	3	
November 2	"APT." ↑	Rosé and Bruno Mars	1	November 2	40	
November 2	"Tu Boda"	Óscar Maydon and Fuerza Regida	4	November 2	5	
November 2	"Love Somebody" ↑	Morgan Wallen	8	November 2	1	
November 9	"Whiplash"	Aespa	8	November 9	1	
November 9	"St. Chroma" ↑	Tyler, the Creator featuring Daniel Caesar	10	November 9	1	
November 16	"That's So True"	Gracie Abrams	4	November 23	16	
November 23	"Sailor Song"	Gigi Perez	10	November 23	1	
November 30	"Running Wild" ↑	Jin	5	November 30	1	
December 7	"Squabble Up" ↑	Kendrick Lamar	3	December 7	1	
December 7	"TV Off" ↑	Kendrick Lamar featuring Lefty Gunplay	5	December 7	5	
December 7	"Wacced Out Murals" ↑	Kendrick Lamar	6	December 7	1	
December 7	"Hey Now" ↑	Kendrick Lamar featuring Dody6	10	December 7	1	

=== 2023 peaks ===
List of Billboard Global 200 top ten singles in 2024 that peaked in 2023
Top ten entry date	Single	Artist(s)	Peak	Peak date	Weeks in top ten	Ref.
January 28	"Flowers"^{[A]}^{[C]} ↑	Miley Cyrus	1	January 28	30	
July 8	"Cruel Summer"^{[A]}	Taylor Swift	1	November 4	31	
July 29	"Seven"^{[A]} ↑	Jungkook featuring Latto	1	July 29	21	
September 2	"Paint the Town Red"^{[A]}	Doja Cat	1	September 16	16	
October 7	"Greedy"^{[A]}	Tate McRae	1	November 25	24	
November 4	"Water"^{[A]}	Tyla	6	December 2	4	

=== 2025 peaks ===
List of Billboard Global 200 top ten singles in 2024 that peaked in 2025
Top ten entry date	Single	Artist(s)	Peak	Peak date	Weeks in top ten	Ref.
December 7	"Luther" ↑	Kendrick Lamar and SZA	3	March 1	21	

=== 2026 peaks ===
List of Billboard Global 200 top ten singles in 2024 that peaked in 2026
Top ten entry date	Single	Artist(s)	Peak	Peak date	Weeks in top ten	Ref.
March 16	"End of Beginning"	Djo	1	January 17	15	

=== Holiday season ===
Holiday titles first making the Billboard Global 200 top ten during the 2023–24 holiday season
Top ten entry date	Single	Artist(s)	Peak	Peak date	Weeks in top ten	Ref.
December 30, 2023	"Let It Snow! Let It Snow! Let It Snow!"	Dean Martin	6	January 6	4	

Recurring holiday titles, appearing in the Billboard Global 200 top ten in previous holiday seasons
Top ten entry date	Single	Artist(s)	Peak	Peak date	Weeks in top ten	Ref.
December 12, 2020	"All I Want for Christmas Is You"^{[Q]}	Mariah Carey	1	December 19, 2020	33	
December 12, 2020	"Last Christmas"^{[R]}	Wham!	1	December 20, 2025	30	
December 12, 2020	"Rockin' Around the Christmas Tree"^{[R]}	Brenda Lee	2	December 24, 2022	27	
December 19, 2020	"Jingle Bell Rock"^{[R]}	Bobby Helms	4	January 2, 2021	26	
December 19, 2020	"It's Beginning to Look a Lot Like Christmas"	Michael Buble	6	January 2, 2021	14	
December 26, 2020	"Santa Tell Me"^{[S]}	Ariana Grande	5	January 2, 2021	20	
January 2, 2021	"It's the Most Wonderful Time of the Year"	Andy Williams	7	January 2, 2021	11	
January 2, 2021	"Underneath the Tree"^{[T]}	Kelly Clarkson	6	December 30, 2023	11	
January 2, 2021	"Feliz Navidad"	Jose Feliciano	5	January 7, 2023	7	

== Notes ==
^{A} The single re-entered the top ten on the week ending January 13, 2024.
^{B} The single re-entered the top ten on the week ending February 3, 2024.
^{C} The single re-entered the top ten on the week ending February 17, 2024.
^{D} The single re-entered the top ten on the week ending March 2, 2024.
^{E} The single re-entered the top ten on the week ending March 9, 2024.
^{F} The single re-entered the top ten on the week ending March 16, 2024.
^{G} The single re-entered the top ten on the week ending March 23, 2024.
^{H} The single re-entered the top ten on the week ending May 11, 2024.
^{I} The single re-entered the top ten on the week ending June 22, 2024.
^{J} The single re-entered the top ten on the week ending July 6, 2024.
^{K} The single re-entered the top ten on the week ending July 20, 2024.
^{L} The single re-entered the top ten on the week ending July 27, 2024.
^{M} The single re-entered the top ten on the week ending August 31, 2024.
^{N} The single re-entered the top ten on the week ending September 7, 2024.
^{O} The single re-entered the top ten on the week ending October 5, 2024.
^{P} The single re-entered the top ten on the week ending November 16, 2024.
^{Q} The single re-entered the top ten on the week ending November 30, 2024.
^{R} The single re-entered the top ten on the week ending December 14, 2024.
^{S} The single re-entered the top ten on the week ending December 21, 2024.
^{T} The single re-entered the top ten on the week ending December 28, 2024.
