= List of top 10 singles for 2024 in Australia =

This is a list of songs that charted in the top ten of the ARIA Charts in 2024.

== Top-ten singles ==
Key

Symbol	Meaning
◁	Indicates single's top 10 entry was also its ARIA top 50 debut
(#)	2024 Year-end top 10 single position and rank

List of ARIA top ten singles that peaked in 2024
Top ten entry date	Single	Artist(s)	Peak	Peak date	Weeks in top ten	Refs.
Singles from 2023
3 July	"Cruel Summer" (#9)	Taylor Swift	1	26 February	42	
25 September	"Prada"	Cassö, Raye and D-Block Europe	3	5 February	22	
Singles from 2024
8 January	"Stick Season" (#4)	Noah Kahan	1	5 February	17	
22 January	"Yes, And?" ◁	Ariana Grande	2	22 January	2	
29 January	"Lose Control" (#5)	Teddy Swims	4	15 April	17	
5 February	"Beautiful Things" (#1)	Benson Boone	1	11 March	69	
12 February	"Saving Up"	Dom Dolla	10	12 February	1	
19 February	"Carnival" ◁	Kanye West and Ty Dolla Sign	5	11 March	4	
26 February	"Texas Hold 'Em"	Beyonce	2	4 March	8	
4 March	"Saturn" ◁	SZA	8	4 March	1	
11 March	"End of Beginning"	Djo	3	18 March	7	
18 March	"We Can't Be Friends (Wait for Your Love)" ◁	Ariana Grande	2	18 March	6	
1 April	"Like That" ◁	Future and Metro Boomin	8	1 April	2	
1 April	"Too Sweet" ◁ (#8)	Hozier	1	22 April	12	
8 April	"I Like the Way You Kiss Me"	Artemas	3	15 April	6	
22 April	"Espresso" ◁ (#3)	Sabrina Carpenter	1	13 May	35	
29 April	"Fortnight" ◁	Taylor Swift featuring Post Malone	1	29 April	5	
29 April	"Down Bad" ◁	Taylor Swift	2	29 April	2	
29 April	"The Tortured Poets Department" ◁	Taylor Swift	3	29 April	1	
29 April	"So Long, London" ◁	Taylor Swift	4	29 April	2	
29 April	"I Can Do It with a Broken Heart" ◁	Taylor Swift	5	29 April	4	
29 April	"My Boy Only Breaks His Favorite Toys" ◁	Taylor Swift	6	29 April	1	
29 April	"But Daddy I Love Him" ◁	Taylor Swift	7	29 April	1	
29 April	"Florida!!!" ◁	Taylor Swift featuring Florence + the Machine	8	29 April	1	
29 April	"Who's Afraid of the Little Old Me?" ◁	Taylor Swift	9	29 April	1	
29 April	"Guilty as Sin?" ◁	Taylor Swift	10	29 April	1	
6 May	"A Bar Song (Tipsy)" (#2)	Shaboozey	1	8 July	41	
13 May	"Million Dollar Baby" (#10)	Tommy Richman	1	27 May	14	
13 May	"Euphoria" ◁	Kendrick Lamar	8	13 May	1	
20 May	"I Had Some Help" ◁ (#7)	Post Malone featuring Morgan Wallen	1	20 May	33	
27 May	"Lunch" ◁	Billie Eilish	5	27 May	4	
27 May	"Chihiro" ◁	Billie Eilish	7	27 May	2	
27 May	"Birds of a Feather" ◁ (#6)	Billie Eilish	1	19 August	57	
10 June	"Houdini" ◁	Eminem	1	10 June	7	
10 June	"Band4Band"	Central Cee and Lil Baby	9	10 June	1	
17 June	"Please Please Please" ◁	Sabrina Carpenter	1	24 June	19	
24 June	"Austin"	Dasha	10	24 June	1	
8 July	"Good Luck, Babe!"	Chappell Roan	4	19 August	19	
12 August	"Guess" ◁	Charli XCX	1	12 August	4	
19 August	"Big Dawgs"	Hanumankind featuring Kalmi	9	19 August	2	
26 August	"Die With A Smile" ◁	Bruno Mars and Lady Gaga	2	23 September	43	
2 September	"Taste" ◁	Sabrina Carpenter	1	2 September	20	
9 September	"Bed Chem"	Sabrina Carpenter	10	9 September	7	
28 October	"Apt." ◁	Rosé and Bruno Mars	1	28 October	33	
28 October	"I Love You, I'm Sorry"	Gracie Abrams	7	28 October	1	
4 November	"That's So True"	Gracie Abrams	1	18 November	31	
4 November	"Sailor Song"	Gigi Perez	8	18 November	6	
2 December	"Squabble Up" ◁	Kendrick Lamar	9	2 December	1	

=== 2002 peaks ===
List of ARIA top ten singles in 2024 that peaked in 2002
Top ten entry date	Single	Artist(s)	Peak	Peak date	Weeks in top ten	References
18 February	"Murder on the Dancefloor" ◁	Sophie Ellis-Bextor	3	18 February	16	

=== 2019 peaks ===
List of ARIA top ten singles in 2024 that peaked in 2019
Top ten entry date	Single	Artist(s)	Peak	Peak date	Weeks in top ten	References
2 September	"Lover"	Taylor Swift	3	2 September	4	

=== 2022 peaks ===
List of ARIA top ten singles in 2024 that peaked in 2022
Top ten entry date	Single	Artist(s)	Peak	Peak date	Weeks in top ten	References
31 October	"Anti-Hero" ◁	Taylor Swift	1	31 October	32	

=== 2023 peaks ===
List of ARIA top ten singles in 2024 that peaked in 2023
Top ten entry date	Single	Artist(s)	Peak	Peak date	Weeks in top ten	References
6 March	"Last Night"	Morgan Wallen	1	17 April	37	
14 August	"Paint the Town Red" ◁	Doja Cat	1	28 August	25	
25 September	"Greedy" ◁	Tate McRae	2	9 October	29	
25 September	"Strangers"	Kenya Grace	2	2 October	11	
9 October	"I Remember Everything"	Zach Bryan featuring Kacey Musgraves	6	23 October	16	
23 October	"Something in the Orange"	Zach Bryan	6	18 December	9	
23 October	"Water"	Tyla	6	30 October	9	
20 November	"Lovin on Me" ◁	Jack Harlow	1	20 November	19	

=== 2025 peaks ===
List of ARIA top ten singles in 2024 that peaked in 2025
Top ten entry date	Single	Artist(s)	Peak	Peak date	Weeks in top ten	References
13 May	"Not Like Us" ◁	Kendrick Lamar	1	17 February	16	
2 December	"Luther" ◁	Kendrick Lamar and SZA	2	24 February	10	
23 December	"Messy"	Lola Young	1	3 February	20	

=== Holiday season ===
Holiday titles first making the ARIA Top 50 top ten during the 2023–24 holiday season
Top ten entry date	Single	Artist(s)	Peak	Peak date	Weeks in top ten	Ref.
1 January 2024	"Underneath the Tree"	Kelly Clarkson	6	30 December 2024	2	

Recurring holiday titles, appearing in the ARIA Top 50 top ten in previous holiday seasons
Top ten entry date	Single	Artist(s)	Peak	Peak date	Weeks in top ten	Ref.
1 January 2018	"All I Want for Christmas Is You"	Mariah Carey	1	31 December 2018	25	
31 December 2018	"Last Christmas"	Wham!	2	28 December 2020	16	
30 December 2019	"It's Beginning to Look a Lot Like Christmas"	Michael Bublé	3	3 January 2022	9	
28 December 2020	"Santa Tell Me"	Ariana Grande	5	3 January 2022	7	
3 January 2022	"Rockin' Around the Christmas Tree"	Brenda Lee	2	2 January 2023	9	
2 January 2023	"Jingle Bell Rock"	Bobby Helms	4	30 December 2024	3	
2 January 2023	"Holly Jolly Christmas"	Michael Bublé	7	2 January 2023	2	
2 January 2023	"It's the Most Wonderful Time of the Year"	Andy Williams	8	2 January 2023	3	

== See also ==
- List of number-one singles of 2024 (Australia)
