= List of top 10 singles in 2024 (Ireland) =

This is a list of singles that have peaked in the top 10 of the Irish Singles Chart in 2024, as compiled by the Official Charts Company on behalf of the Irish Recorded Music Association.

== Top 10 singles ==
Key

Symbol	Meaning
◁	Indicates single's top 10 entry was also its Irish Singles Chart top 100 debut

Artist(s)	Single	Peak	Peak date	Weeks at #1	Ref.
Sophie Ellis-Bextor	"Murder on the Dancefloor"	2	12 January	-	
Ariana Grande	"Yes, And?" ◁	2	19 January	-	
Noah Kahan and Sam Fender	"Homesick"	4	26 January	-	
Natasha Bedingfield	"Unwritten"	6	2 February	-	
Teddy Swims	"Lose Control"	4	2 February	-	
Dua Lipa	"Training Season" ◁	6	23 February	-	
Beyoncé	"Texas Hold 'Em"	1	23 February	3	
YG Marley	"Praise Jah in the Moonlight"	9	1 March	-	
NewEra	"Birds in the Sky"	7	1 March	-	
¥$ featuring Rich the Kid and Playboi Carti	"Carnival"	6	8 March	-	
Djo	"End of Beginning"	2	15 March	-	
Benson Boone	"Beautiful Things"	1	15 March	4	
Ariana Grande	"We Can't Be Friends (Wait for Your Love)" ◁	3	22 March	-	
Future, Metro Boomin and Kendrick Lamar	"Like That" ◁	10	29 March	-	
Michael Marcagi	"Scared to Start"	4	12 April	-	
Hozier	"Too Sweet" ◁	1	12 April	3	
Artemas	"I Like the Way You Kiss Me"	2	19 April	-	
Taylor Swift	"I Can Do It with a Broken Heart" ◁	5	26 April	-	
Taylor Swift	"The Tortured Poets Department" ◁	4	26 April	-	
Taylor Swift featuring Post Malone	"Fortnight" ◁	2	26 April	-	
Mark Ambor	"Belong Together"	6	3 May	-	
Sabrina Carpenter	"Espresso" ◁	1	3 May	4	
Tommy Richman	"Million Dollar Baby"	5	17 May	-	
Post Malone featuring Morgan Wallen	"I Had Some Help" ◁	1	17 May	1	
Billie Eilish	"Chihiro" ◁	7	24 May	-	
Billie Eilish	"Lunch" ◁	4	31 May	-	
Shaboozey	"A Bar Song (Tipsy)"	1	31 May	1	
Central Cee and Lil Baby	"Band4Band"	9	7 June	-	
Eminem	"Houdini" ◁	2	7 June	-	
Sabrina Carpenter	"Please Please Please" ◁	1	14 June	7	
Myles Smith	"Stargazing"	5	12 July	-	
Billie Eilish	"Birds of a Feather"	3	12 July	-	
Bl3ss, Camrinwatsin and Bbyclose	"Kisses"	7	2 August	-	
Chappell Roan	"Good Luck, Babe!"	1	2 August	3	
Charli XCX	"Apple"	9	9 August	-	
Charli XCX featuring Billie Eilish	"Guess" ◁	1	9 August	1	
Dasha	"Austin"	5	16 August	-	
Sabrina Carpenter	"Taste" ◁	1	30 August	7	
Oasis	"Wonderwall"	10	6 September	-	
Oasis	"Live Forever"	7	6 September	-	
Oasis	"Don't Look Back in Anger"	6	6 September	-	
Coldplay	"The Scientist"	5	6 September	-	
Coldplay	"We Pray" ◁	7	13 September	-	
Sabrina Carpenter	"Bed Chem" ◁	5	13 September	-	
Lady Gaga and Bruno Mars	"Die with a Smile"	3	27 September	-	
The Weeknd and Playboi Carti	"Timeless" ◁	9	4 October	-	
Charli XCX featuring Ariana Grande	"Sympathy Is a Knife"	7	18 October	-	
Chappell Roan	"Hot to Go!"	5	18 October	-	
Gracie Abrams	"I Love You, I'm Sorry"	1	18 October	2	
One Direction	"Night Changes"	4	25 October	-	
Addison Rae	"Diet Pepsi"	7	1 November	-	
Sonny Fodera, Jazzy and D.O.D.	"Somedays"	5	1 November	-	
Gigi Perez	"Sailor Song"	1	1 November	1	
Tyler, the Creator and Daniel Caesar	"St. Chroma"	10	8 November	-	
Teddy Swims	"The Door"	8	8 November	-	
Gracie Abrams	"That's So True" ◁	1	8 November	13	
Gracie Abrams	"Close to You"	10	15 November	-	
Teddy Swims	"Bad Dreams"	8	15 November	-	
Tate McRae	"2 Hands" ◁	6	22 November	-	
Kendrick Lamar and SZA	"Luther" ◁	7	29 November	-	
Kendrick Lamar and Lefty Gunplay	"TV Off" ◁	5	29 November	-	
Kendrick Lamar	"Squabble Up" ◁	3	29 November	-	
Cynthia Erivo and Ariana Grande	"Defying Gravity"	10	6 December	-	
Sabrina Carpenter	"A Nonsense Christmas"	9	20 December	-	
Mark Ambor	"Run Rudolph Run"	9	27 December	-	
Ariana Grande	"Santa Tell Me"	8	27 December	-	
Laufey	"Winter Wonderland"	7	27 December	-	
Bobby Helms	"Jingle Bell Rock"	5	27 December	-	
Brenda Lee	"Rockin' Around the Christmas Tree"	2	27 December	-	

== Entries by artist ==
The following table shows artists who achieved two or more top 10 entries in 2024. The figures include both main artists and featured artists and the peak position in brackets.

Entries	Artist	Singles
5	Ariana Grande	"Yes, And?" (2), "We Can't Be Friends (Wait for Your Love)" (3), "Sympathy Is a Knife" (7), "Defying Gravity" (10), "Santa Tell Me" (8)
5	Kendrick Lamar	"Like That" (10), "Not Like Us" (7), "Luther" (7), "TV Off" (5), "Squabble Up" (3)
5	Sabrina Carpenter	"Espresso" (1), "Please Please Please" (1), "Taste" (1), "Bed Chem" (5), "A Nonsense Christmas" (9)
4	Billie Eilish	"Chihiro" (7), "Lunch" (4)", Birds of a Feather" (3), "Guess" (1)
3
3	Charli XCX	"Apple" (9), "Guess" (1), "Sympathy Is a Knife" (7)
3	Gracie Abrams	"I Love You, I'm Sorry" (1), "That's So True" (1), "Close to You" (10)
3	Oasis	"Wonderwall" (10), "Live Forever" (7), "Don't Look Back in Anger" (6)
3	Taylor Swift	"I Can Do It with a Broken Heart" (5), "The Torture Poets Department" (4), "Fortnight" (2)
3	Teddy Swims	"Lose Control" (4), "The Door" (8), "Bad Dreams" (8)
2
2	Chappell Roan	"Good Luck, Babe!" (1), "Hot to Go!" (5)
2	Coldplay	"The Scientist" (5), "We Pray" (7)
2	Mark Ambor	"Belong Together" (6), "Run Rudolph Run" (9)
2	Playboi Carti	"Carnival" (6), "Timeless" (9)
2	Post Malone	"Fortnight" (2), "I Had Some Help" (1)

== See also ==
- 2024 in music
- List of number-one singles of 2024 (Ireland)
