= L'Amour de Ma Vie =

2024 song by Billie Eilish

- "Over Now" extended edit cover

Promotional single by Billie Eilish

from the album Hit Me Hard and Soft
- Language: English
- English title: "The Love of My Life"
- Written: October 2022 – 2023
- Released: May 17, 2024
- Genre: "L'Amour de Ma Vie": Easy listening; smooth jazz; lounge; soft rock; "Over Now": Electropop; disco; hyperpop; synth-pop
- Length: 5:33; 4:31 (Over Now extended edit)
- Label: Darkroom; Interscope
- Songwriters: Billie Eilish O'Connell; Finneas O'Connell
- Producer: Finneas

Lyric video
- "L'Amour de Ma Vie" on YouTube

"L'Amour de Ma Vie" (French for 'The Love of My Life') is a promotional single by American singer-songwriter Billie Eilish from her third studio album, Hit Me Hard and Soft, released through Darkroom and Interscope Records on May 17, 2024. Written by Eilish and her brother Finneas O'Connell, who also produced the track, it is a breakup song composed of two distinct parts. (Note: "Over Now" is mostly referred to as the second part in "L'Amour de Ma Vie", although The Guardian and SputnikMusic called it a coda.) It begins as a jazz and soft rock tune supported by guitar and singing style compared to Icelandic singer-songwriter Laufey, before transitioning to an electronic section based on club beats, 1980s synths and Auto Tuned vocals.

An extended version of the song's second part, subtitled "Over Now", was released on May 22, 2024, as a promotional single. It was nominated for Best Dance Pop Recording at the 67th Annual Grammy Awards.

== Background and release ==
Following her second studio album, Happier Than Ever (2021), Eilish continued collaborating with her brother Finneas O'Connell, and the following year she surprise-released Guitar Songs (2022), consisting of two tracks. In October 2022, she revealed in a Vanity Fair interview that she had also made another track, before experiencing writer's block, which was broken by her involvement in the soundtrack of the 2023 film Barbie, for which Eilish contributed "What Was I Made For?"—which became her second number-one single in the United Kingdom and earned her a second Academy Award for Best Original Song, after "No Time to Die" (2020).

In an interview with Apple Music's Zane Lowe, the siblings recalled that they made a song called "Over Now" in October 2022 with the purpose of being a track to exercise to. For over a year, they did not decide what to do with the song, with Finneas suggesting releasing it as it was as the "bravest" move. However, they chose to rewrite and shorten it and add it to the end of an unrelated song as a "little surprise". It featured on "L'Amour de Ma Vie", a song with a "mean" and "dismissive" chorus and bridge. The producer said that they wrote verses to justify the negativity present in the rest of the song, which he compared to the previous album track "The Greatest", noting that it contrasts its lyrics.

Eilish announced the release of her third studio album, Hit Me Hard and Soft, on April 8, 2024, with a promotional video. Five days later, she previewed "L'Amour de Ma Vie" during her surprise DJ set at Coachella 2024, alongside "Lunch" and "Chihiro". On April 18, she unveiled the album's track listing. Hit Me Hard and Soft was released on May 17 as scheduled, with "L'Amour de Ma Vie" as the seventh track on the record. The following Tuesday, Eilish released the "club-ready" extended edit of the song's second part, "Over Now". "L'Amour de Ma Vie" debuted at number 22 on the US Billboard Hot 100, landing in the top 40 along with all of the album's tracks, doubling her top-40 entries from ten to 20.

== Music and lyrics ==
"L'Amour de Ma Vie" is a two-part song: "L'Amour de Ma Vie" and "Over Now". It is about the dissolution of a relationship, starting as a retro and bossa nova-influenced side, before segueing into an electronic part. Media outlets noted that the track begins as a piece reminiscent of works by late French singer Édith Piaf and Icelandic singer-songwriter Laufey, while the ending has been compared to Charli XCX's hyperpop material, as well as to the Weeknd's "Blinding Lights" (2019). Eilish's attitude on the song was compared to her previous songs such as "Bitches Broken Hearts" and "Party Favor" (both 2018), while the sonicscape called back reviewers to "Happier Than Ever" (2021).

"L'Amour de Ma Vie" has been described as a "lounge", "swingy", and "torchy" ballad, combining easy listening, jazz, retro-pop and soft rock genres. Eilish sings in "smokey" and "unrepentant" tone, reminiscent of Laufey. as well as Eilish's records such as her debut album and Happier Than Ever's "Billie Bossa Nova". In the first verse, she unveils that she told her ex-partner a lie–that they were the titular love of her life. Later, she admits that the situation became ironic, hence they found a new lover, even though they stated they would not be able to "fall in love again because of [Eilish]". Through this part, she is supported by a "wobbl[y]" and "warp[y]" guitar. The lyric "And you moved on" starts to be repeated, while the sonicscape changes to an electronic part, introducing club beats.

The second part, titled "Over Now", is a high-tempo and "hectic" disco, electropop, hyperpop, and synth-pop song with synths reminiscent of the 1980s and Auto Tuned vocals. In particular, a bar of music appears to sample "Children" by Robert Miles, a mid-1990s instrumental single. "Over Now" also incorporates sounds reminiscent of '80s video game noises in its production, to earn a bitpop beat. During this side, Eilish sings about the outcome of the breakup, as she lays with a woman telling her about her past lover–calling them "mediocre" and addressing that both of them are "glad" that the relationship ended. The part was described as "dark", "pinwheeling[ing]", and "pulsating". In an extended edit, Eilish swoops more biting words towards her previous lover, finishing the song singing: "I wasn't satiated / You're looking older lately / Dating another baby".

== Accolades ==
Awards and nominations for "L'Amour de Ma Vie"
| Organization | Year | Category | Result | Ref. |
|---|---|---|---|---|
| Grammy Awards | 2025 | Best Dance Pop Recording (Note: "Over Now" extended edit only) | Nominated | |

== Charts ==
=== Weekly charts ===
Weekly chart performance for "L'Amour de Ma Vie"
| Chart (2024) | Peak position |
|---|---|
| Australia (ARIA) | 15 |
| Belgium (Ultratop 50 Flanders) | 47 |
| Brazil Hot 100 (Billboard) | 65 |
| Canada Hot 100 (Billboard) | 22 |
| Czech Republic Singles Digital (ČNS IFPI) | 16 |
| Denmark (Tracklisten) | 38 |
| France (SNEP) | 38 |
| Global 200 (Billboard) | 17 |
| Greece International Streaming (IFPI) | 24 |
| Ireland (Billboard) | 22 |
| Iceland (Tónlistinn) | 28 |
| Israel (Mako Hitlist) | 78 |
| Lithuania (AGATA) | 26 |
| Luxembourg (Billboard) | 23 |
| Malaysia (Billboard) | 14 |
| Malaysia International Streaming (RIM) | 11 |
| New Zealand (Recorded Music NZ) | 15 |
| Norway (VG-lista) | 40 |
| Poland (Polish Streaming Top 100) | 32 |
| Portugal (AFP) | 8 |
| Slovakia Singles Digital (ČNS IFPI) | 30 |
| South Africa (TOSAC) | 47 |
| South Korea BGM (Circle) | 151 |
| South Korea Download (Circle) | 125 |
| Spain (Promusicae) | 69 |
| Sweden (Sverigetopplistan) | 72 |
| UK Singles (Official Charts) | 96 |
| US Billboard Hot 100 | 22 |
| US Hot Rock & Alternative Songs (Billboard) | 8 |

=== Year-end charts ===
2024 year-end chart performance for "L'Amour de Ma Vie"
| Chart (2024) | Position |
|---|---|
| US Hot Rock & Alternative Songs (Billboard) | 24 |

== Certifications ==
Certifications for "L'Amour de Ma Vie"
| Region | Certification | Certified units/sales |
|---|---|---|
| Australia (ARIA) | Platinum | 70,000^{‡} |
| Belgium (BRMA) | Gold | 20,000^{‡} |
| Brazil (Pro-Música Brasil) | Diamond | 160,000^{‡} |
| Brazil (Pro-Música Brasil) Over Now Extended Edit | Gold | 20,000^{‡} |
| Canada (Music Canada) | 2× Platinum | 160,000^{‡} |
| Denmark (IFPI Danmark) | Gold | 45,000^{‡} |
| France (SNEP) | Platinum | 200,000^{‡} |
| New Zealand (RMNZ) | Platinum | 30,000^{‡} |
| Portugal (AFP) | Gold | 5,000^{‡} |
| Spain (Promusicae) | Gold | 30,000^{‡} |
| United Kingdom (BPI) | Gold | 400,000^{‡} |
| United States (RIAA) | Platinum | 1,000,000^{‡} |
^{‡} Sales+streaming figures based on certification alone.

== Release history ==
Release dates and formats for "L'Amour de Ma Vie"
| Region | Date | Format(s) | Version | Label | Ref. |
|---|---|---|---|---|---|
| Various | May 22, 2024 | Digital download; streaming | "Over Now" extended edit | Darkroom; Interscope | |
