= Chihiro (song) =

Single by Billie Eilish

from the album Hit Me Hard and Soft
- Released: January 17, 2025
- Recorded: April 2023
- Genre: Dance-pop; funk; R&B
- Length: 5:03
- Label: Darkroom; Interscope
- Songwriters: Billie Eilish; Finneas O'Connell
- Producer: Finneas O'Connell

Billie Eilish singles chronology
"Guess" (2024)	"Chihiro" (2025)	"Wildflower" (2025)

Music video
- "Chihiro" on YouTube

"Chihiro" is a song by the American singer-songwriter Billie Eilish. The third track on her third studio album, Hit Me Hard and Soft (2024), it was released to Italian contemporary hit radio stations on January 17, 2025, via EMI. The song was written by Eilish and her brother Finneas O'Connell, who also produced the track for Darkroom and Interscope Records.

== Background and release ==
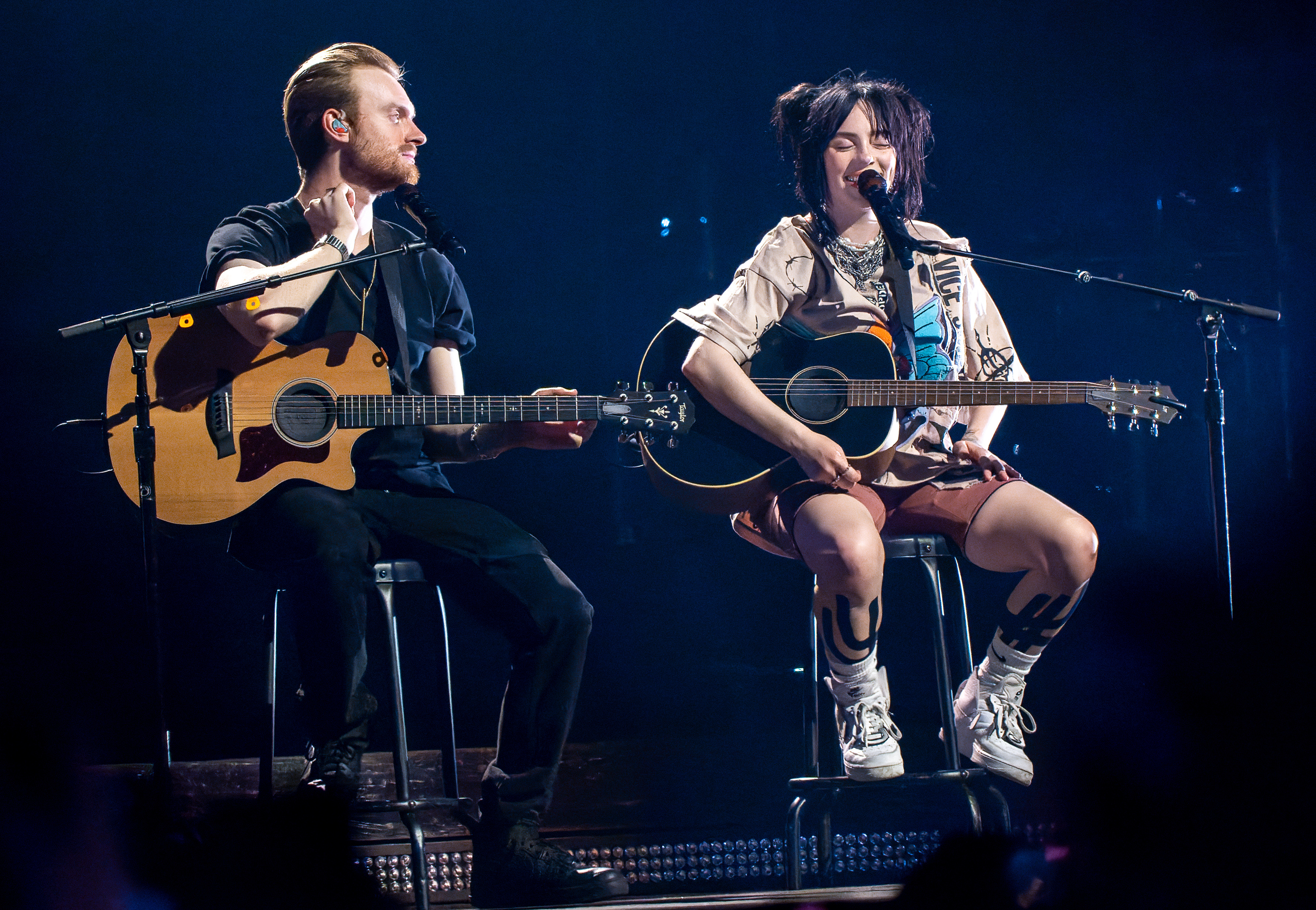
Billie Eilish (right) and her brother Finneas O'Connell (left) performing in June 2022

On April 12, 2024, in an interview with Apple Music's presenter Zane Lowe, Eilish teased a 15-second snippet of "Chihiro", which was released on her third studio album, Hit Me Hard and Soft (2024). The song's title is a reference to Chihiro Ogino, the main character of the 2001 Studio Ghibli animated film Spirited Away. In an interview with Angie Martoccio of Rolling Stone, Eilish said:

The song is loosely based off of that movie, which is one of my favorites. It’s kind of from her point of view, mixed with mine. The visuals in that movie are some of the best ever—all that Studio Ghibli shit is unbelievable ... There’s all those visuals of the train in the water after the flood, and it literally looks like an ocean with a train track. I had just watched Spirited Away and [brother-and-frequent-collaborator] Finneas had made that beat. I love that movie. I’ve seen it so many times.

"Chihiro" was written by Eilish and Finneas; the latter also produced the song. It was recorded in Los Angeles, California, United States.

"Chihiro" was previewed with "Lunch" and "L'Amour de Ma Vie" at Coachella 2024. On May 10, 2024, Eilish released a 49-second-long clip of "Chihiro" through the YouTube channel of the rhythm game Fortnite Festival because it was confirmed the song would be included as a backing track on the third season of the game. "Chihiro" is the third song on Hit Me Hard and Soft; it was released with the studio album on May 17, 2024, through Darkroom and Interscope Records.

Eilish and Finneas hosted free listening parties prior to the album's release; American Express presented a party on May 15 at the Barclays Center in Brooklyn, New York, and another on May 16 at the Kia Forum in Inglewood, California, in association with Snapchat. On May 15 at the Barclays Center, "Chihiro" garnered some of the evening's most-enthusiastic crowd response.

"Chihiro" was released as a single in Italy on January 16, 2025, through EMI.

== Composition and lyrics ==
"Chihiro" is a mid-tempo dance-pop, funk, and R&B song that incorporates elements of progressive R&B and tech house. In the lyrics, Eilish sings of feelings of being lost and found that are reminiscent of the Spirited Away character Ogino Chihiro.

== Commercial performance ==
After the release of Hit Me Hard and Soft on May 17, 2024, "Chihiro" made its debut at number six on the Billboard Global 200 chart. It debuted at number 12 on the Billboard Hot 100 and at number three on the US Hot Rock & Alternative Songs chart. Additionally, the song debuted at number seven on the UK Top 10.

A remix named as "MTG Chihiro" by Mulú was initially denied permission for releasing on streaming platforms by Billie Eilish's management, including her brother Finneas. After negotiations, Eilish's team allowed Duda Beat to record the remixed version. It combines the track with Brazilian funk elements and gained significant popularity on social media platforms, particularly TikTok, where it became the soundtrack for the "passinho Chihiro" dance.

Critics' year-end rankings of "Chihiro"
Publication	List	Rank	Ref.
Beats Per Minute	Top 50 Songs of 2024	16	
Slant Magazine	The 50 Best Songs of 2024	20	
Vogue	The 24 Best Songs of 2024	—N/a	

== Music video ==
The music video for "Chihiro" was teased on June 5, 2024, when Eilish shared on social media a short video in which she runs down a hallway. It premiered on Eilish's Vevo channel on YouTube at 09:00 Pacific Daylight Time (PDT) on June 6. Eilish directed the music video and stars in it alongside Nat Wolff.

== Accolades ==
Awards and nominations for "Chihiro"
Year	Award	Category	Result	Ref.
2025	Music Awards Japan	Best International Alternative Song in Japan	Nominated	

== Charts ==
=== Weekly charts ===
Weekly chart performance for "Chihiro"
Chart (2024–2025)	Peak position
Argentina Hot 100 (Billboard)	85
Australia (ARIA)	7
Austria (Ö3 Austria Top 40)	3
Belgium (Ultratop 50 Flanders)	21
Belgium (Ultratop 50 Wallonia)	25
Brazil Hot 100 (Billboard)	20
Canada Hot 100 (Billboard)	12
Croatia Streaming (Billboard)	18
Czech Republic Singles Digital (ČNS IFPI)	3
Denmark (Tracklisten)	12
Finland (Suomen virallinen lista)	21
France (SNEP)	12
Germany (GfK)	35
Global 200 (Billboard)	6
Greece International (IFPI)	4
Hungary (Single Top 40)	13
Iceland (Tónlistinn)	9
Ireland (IRMA)	11
Israel (Mako Hitlist)	41
Italy (FIMI)	48
Latvia Streaming (LaIPA)	3
Lebanon English (Lebanese Top 20)	15
Lithuania (AGATA)	2
Luxembourg (Billboard)	4
MENA (IFPI)	5
Netherlands (Single Top 100)	10
New Zealand (Recorded Music NZ)	6
Norway (VG-lista)	7
Poland (Polish Streaming Top 100)	7
Portugal (AFP)	2
San Marino (SMRRTV Top 50)	21
Saudi Arabia (IFPI)	7
Singapore (RIAS)	18
Slovakia Singles Digital (ČNS IFPI)	4
South Africa (TOSAC)	12
Spain (Promusicae)	24
Sweden (Sverigetopplistan)	23
Switzerland (Schweizer Hitparade)	4
UAE (IFPI)	8
UK Singles (Official Charts)	7
US Billboard Hot 100	12
US Hot Rock & Alternative Songs (Billboard)	3

=== Monthly charts ===
Monthly chart performance for "Chihiro"
Chart (2024)	Peak position
Brazil Streaming (Pro-Música Brasil)	26

=== Year-end charts ===
Year-end chart performance for "Chihiro"
Chart (2024)	Position
Canada (Canadian Hot 100)	70
France (SNEP)	168
Global 200 (Billboard)	104
Portugal (AFP)	65
Switzerland (Schweizer Hitparade)	49
US Hot Rock & Alternative Songs (Billboard)	16

Year-end chart performance for "Chihiro"
Chart (2025)	Position
Australia (ARIA)	92
Global 200 (Billboard)	73
US Hot Rock & Alternative Songs (Billboard)	83

== Certifications ==
Certifications for "Chihiro"
Region	Certification	Certified units/sales
Australia (ARIA)	2× Platinum	140,000^{‡}
Austria (IFPI Austria)	Platinum	30,000^{‡}
Belgium (BRMA)	Platinum	40,000^{‡}
Brazil (Pro-Música Brasil)	3× Diamond	480,000^{‡}
Canada (Music Canada)	3× Platinum	240,000^{‡}
Denmark (IFPI Danmark)	Platinum	90,000^{‡}
France (SNEP)	Diamond	333,333^{‡}
Germany (BVMI)	Gold	300,000^{‡}
Italy (FIMI)	Gold	100,000^{‡}
New Zealand (RMNZ)	2× Platinum	60,000^{‡}
Poland (ZPAV)	Platinum	50,000^{‡}
Portugal (AFP)	2× Platinum	20,000^{‡}
Spain (Promusicae)	Gold	30,000^{‡}
United Kingdom (BPI)	Platinum	600,000^{‡}
United States (RIAA)	Platinum	1,000,000^{‡}
Streaming
Central America (CFC)	Platinum	7,000,000^{†}
Greece (IFPI Greece)	2× Platinum	4,000,000^{†}
^{‡} Sales+streaming figures based on certification alone.^{†} Streaming-only figures based on certification alone.

== Release history ==
Release dates and formats for "Chihiro"
Region	Date	Format	Label(s)	Ref.
Italy	January 17, 2025	Radio airplay	EMI	

== See also ==
- List of top 10 singles for 2024 in Australia
- List of Billboard Global 200 top-ten singles in 2024
- List of top 10 singles in 2024 (Ireland)
- List of UK top-ten singles in 2024
