= Hit Me Hard and Soft =

Studio album by Billie Eilish
- Released: May 17, 2024
- Recorded: October 2022 – February 2024
- Studios: Finneas's home studio (Los Angeles, California)
- Genres: Alternative pop; bedroom pop
- Length: 43:45
- Labels: Darkroom; Interscope
- Producer: Finneas O'Connell

Billie Eilish chronology
| Guitar Songs (2022) | Hit Me Hard and Soft (2024) | Hit Me Hard and Soft: The Tour (Live) (2026) |

Singles from Hit Me Hard and Soft
- 1. "Lunch" Released: May 17, 2024; 2. "Birds of a Feather" Released: June 18, 2024; 3. "Chihiro" Released: January 17, 2025; 4. "Wildflower" Released: March 4, 2025

Hit Me Hard and Soft is the third studio album by American singer-songwriter Billie Eilish, released on May 17, 2024, through Darkroom and Interscope Records. She co-wrote it with her brother and frequent collaborator, Finneas O'Connell, who also serves as its producer. Stylistically, it has been labeled an alternative pop and bedroom pop record.

Hit Me Hard and Soft received universal acclaim from critics who praised the production, songwriting, and vocal performances. It topped the charts in over 20 countries, including Australia, Canada, Germany, Ireland, New Zealand, Spain, and the United Kingdom. In the United States, it peaked at number two on the Billboard 200 and charted all 10 of its songs in the top 40 of the Billboard Hot 100. It spawned four singles: "Lunch", "Birds of a Feather", "Chihiro", and "Wildflower", all of which achieved commercial success. To support the album, Eilish embarked on Hit Me Hard and Soft: The Tour from September 2024 to November 2025. A concert film documenting its Manchester shows was theatrically released in May 2026 and received a Best Music Film nomination at the 69th Annual Grammy Awards.

At the 67th Annual Grammy Awards, the album and its songs received a total of seven nominations, including Album of the Year, Best Pop Vocal Album, Song of the Year, and Record of the Year. "Wildflower" won Song of the Year at the following ceremony, making Eilish and O'Connell the artists with the most wins in the category. They also tied Adele, Bruno Mars, and Paul Simon for the most wins in the General Field, with seven each.

== Background and recording ==
Eilish co-wrote and recorded her second studio album, Happier Than Ever, at her brother Finneas O'Connell's home recording studio, located in the basement of his Los Angeles residence. Recording took place weekly between April 2020 and February 2021, with the track listing finalized by the duo during creation. Released on July 30, 2021, Happier Than Ever was met with critical acclaim and commercial success, topping the Billboard 200 and receiving two nominations at the 64th Annual Grammy Awards. Eilish surprise-released her second extended play, Guitar Songs, in July 2022. The following year, she released "What Was I Made For?" for the soundtrack to the fantasy-comedy film Barbie (2023); she was inspired to write the song after seeing unfinished scenes of the film during its production. The song won the Academy Award for Best Original Song and Grammy Awards for Song of the Year and Best Song Written for Visual Media.

Eilish began formulating ideas for her third studio album with O'Connell in December 2021. In an interview with Zane Lowe for Apple Music, she mentioned that she hoped to start writing it in 2023. In December 2023, Eilish said on The Tonight Show Starring Jimmy Fallon that it was "almost done". Three months later, she confirmed that it had been mastered.

=== Artwork ===
The album art, which was shot by underwater photographer William Drumm, depicts Eilish falling through a door frame into dark blue water. Eilish described the photoshoot, which took six hours to complete and involved her being repeatedly submerged for two minutes at a time with a weight attached to her shoulders and without goggles or nose plugs, as being one of the most painful experiences of her life.

== Composition ==
=== Music and themes ===
Musically, Hit Me Hard and Soft has been described as an alternative pop and bedroom pop record with influences of electronic music, soft rock, jazz, folk, and orchestral music. Lyrically, it addresses themes of romantic disappointment, desire, body image, depression, fame, betrayal, anxiety, mental illness, romance, death, unhealthy relationship dynamics, isolation, emotional distance, heartbreak, and acceptance. French critic Le Monde framed it as a turn toward romantic tenderness while retaining the darker, more haunting qualities of Eilish's earlier work.

Critics described the album as cohesive yet eclectic alt-pop that shifts from subdued acoustic guitars, softer electronic pulses, and ambient soundscapes to harsher bass drops, dance-influenced passages, and rock crescendos. Amanda Petrusich of The New Yorker described it as centered on anxious love songs and similarly noted its movement between delicate ballads and more forceful moments. Alexis Petridis of The Guardian highlighted the increasingly darker and episodic second half, in which songs frequently change mood, tempo, and arrangement before arriving somewhere different from where they began.

Eilish sings throughout much of Hit Me Hard and Soft in her signature restrained, close-mic vocal style, frequently using layered harmonies and multitracked vocals as an integral part of its production. Pitchfork highlighted the record's dense vocal layering, while noting that its arrangements also include live drums from Andrew Marshall and strings from the Attacca Quartet. However, critics also highlighted moments in which she uses more powerful upper-register belting unheard on her previous material, particularly on "The Greatest" and "Birds of a Feather". In an Apple Music interview with Zane Lowe, Eilish said the album pushed her to expand herself vocally, more than any of her previous records.

=== Songs ===
Hit Me Hard and Soft opens with the track "Skinny", which eases the listener into its moody soundscape with soft reverberated electric guitar, sweeping strings, and close, exposed vocals from Eilish. It is reflective and introspective, as Eilish analyzes her insecurities in a stream of consciousness style, primarily addressing newfound adulthood, body image, and the pressure of fame and public judgment in the digital age. The album then shifts into "Lunch", a playful and sexually charged track with influences of synth-rock and post-punk. The song uses playful food imagery as a metaphor for same-sex desire, emphasizing lust and physical attraction for another woman, and introducing a more explicit side of Eilish's songwriting. The third track, "Chihiro", features atmospheric, house-inspired production and pulsing arpeggiated synths that slowly build tension over its five-minute runtime. Eilish's haunting, ethereal vocal delivery adds to the song's "hypnotic" and emotionally distant mood.

The fourth track, "Birds of a Feather", is a romantic and bittersweet indie pop song with dreamy, new wave-influenced production and subtly morbid undertones. Lyrically, the song expresses deep devotion to a romantic partner through themes of unconditional love, death, and intense emotional attachment. Eilish has said this song pushed her vocally, as her brighter vocal delivery builds to what she called the highest belt of her career. "Wildflower" is a sentimental, slow-burning folk-inspired ballad centered on Eilish's experiences with guilt after dating a female friend's ex-boyfriend. The song begins with tender acoustic guitar and eerie ambient sounds before Eilish enters with an intimate, soulful vocal delivery. It builds to an emotional climax in the bridge, where she sings "did I cross the line?" over crashing drums and guitars, then descends into a hazy acoustic outro with Eilish repeating the bridge's lyrics in a hushed tone.

"The Greatest", the sixth track, is a passionate folk and rock song that critics likened to a mature successor to "Happier Than Ever" (2021). Lyrically, the song finds Eilish attempting to process the devastating effects of a neglectful and emotionally absent partner, using the sarcastic refrain "man, am I the greatest" to express the emotional pain she endured in the relationship. The song crescendos into a heavier second half featuring electric guitars and belted vocals that heighten its cathartic intensity. "L'Amour de Ma Vie" continues the album's shapeshifting sonic tendencies, beginning as a retro, jazz-inflected breakup song with disaffected vocals and lyrics about moving on from a past relationship. Before it ends, the track flips into an energetic dance section, "Over Now", featuring emotive vocals filtered through AutoTune and electronic production drawing from hyperpop and 1980s synth-pop.

Eilish narrates the role of a stalker on the eerie, minimalist "The Diner", which features creeping bass, off-kilter percussion, and dark, carnival-like electronic production. Critics linked the song's sinister, character-driven storytelling to the macabre sound of her debut studio album, When We All Fall Asleep, Where Do We Go? (2019). The ninth and penultimate track, "Bittersuite", is a musical suite that blends immersive electronic and downtempo elements as it moves through several distinct sections, while its lyrics explore private desire and emotional uncertainty. The track bridges into "Blue" through a hazy synth outro, foreshadowing the closing song's melody.

The closing track, "Blue", is a melancholic two-part song that reprises musical and lyrical motifs from earlier in the album while bringing its emotional themes to a close. Its first section, inspired by the unreleased track "True Blue", reflects on heartache, emotional detachment, and the inability to move on from a failed relationship, using the color blue as a repeated image of sadness and regret. The second half shifts into a darker, more atmospheric passage about the emotional wounds of the person Eilish addresses, using imagery such as "born bluer than a butterfly, beautiful and so deprived of oxygen" to suggest familial trauma and emotional deprivation. Eilish ultimately accepts that she cannot continue trying to change or save her partner, ending the relationship with empathy rather than anger. It is noted for its use of lyrics from previous songs, bringing a sense of full closure to its thematic story. These include "I thought we were the same, birds of a feather", referencing "Birds of a Feather"; "désolée, mon amour" from "L'Amour de Ma Vie"; "I'm trying my best" from "The Greatest"; "don't know what's in store / open up the door" from "Chihiro"; "still overseas" from "Bittersuite"; and "a bird in a cage" from "Skinny".

== Release and promotion ==
Hit Me Hard and Soft was released on May 17, 2024. It was available for cassette, CD, digital download, streaming, and vinyl LP. On May 19 and May 22, Eilish released for digital download the isolated vocals, slowed and reverb, and sped-up editions, respectively.

=== Marketing and tour ===
In early April 2024, various news articles reported that billboards teasing snippets of lyrics for Hit Me Hard and Soft had appeared in multiple cities in Australia, the United Kingdom, and the United States; although they did not mention the artist's name, her signature "blohsh" was recognized. (Note: The "blohsh" symbol is a gender-neutral "stick figure person slanting to the left" design used by Eilish since 2016.) The promotional billboards displayed cryptic lyrics, including "She's the headlights I'm the deer" and "Did I cross the line?" Eilish later changed her profile picture to a "blue circle" and shared an image with the caption "Do you know how to bend?" Eilish added her Instagram followers to her "Close friends", a feature that allows limited accounts to see exclusive stories. The post features a "lo-fi" image showcasing the artist's hand and an image of her new midriff tattoo.

Eilish previewed the songs "Lunch", "L'Amour de Ma Vie", and "Chihiro" during a surprise DJ set at Coachella on April 13, 2024. In an interview published on April 24, she told Rolling Stone that she would not release singles prior to release. She explained that she does not like singles before album releases because she "really [doesn't] like when things are out of context" and compared Hit Me Hard and Soft to "a family", adding that she "[doesn't] want one little kid in the middle of the room alone". In May, a preview of "Chihiro" was featured in a Fortnite trailer revealing Eilish's second in-game outfit. The song was also made available as a "Jam Track" to use in the Fortnite Festival mode alongside "Lunch" and "The Diner". Furthermore, a snippet of "Birds of a Feather" was featured in a promotional clip for the third season of the Netflix series Heartstopper. Eilish held listening party events for fans at the Barclays Center in Brooklyn on May 15 and Kia Forum in Inglewood on May 16, in both cases premiering the album in its entirety.

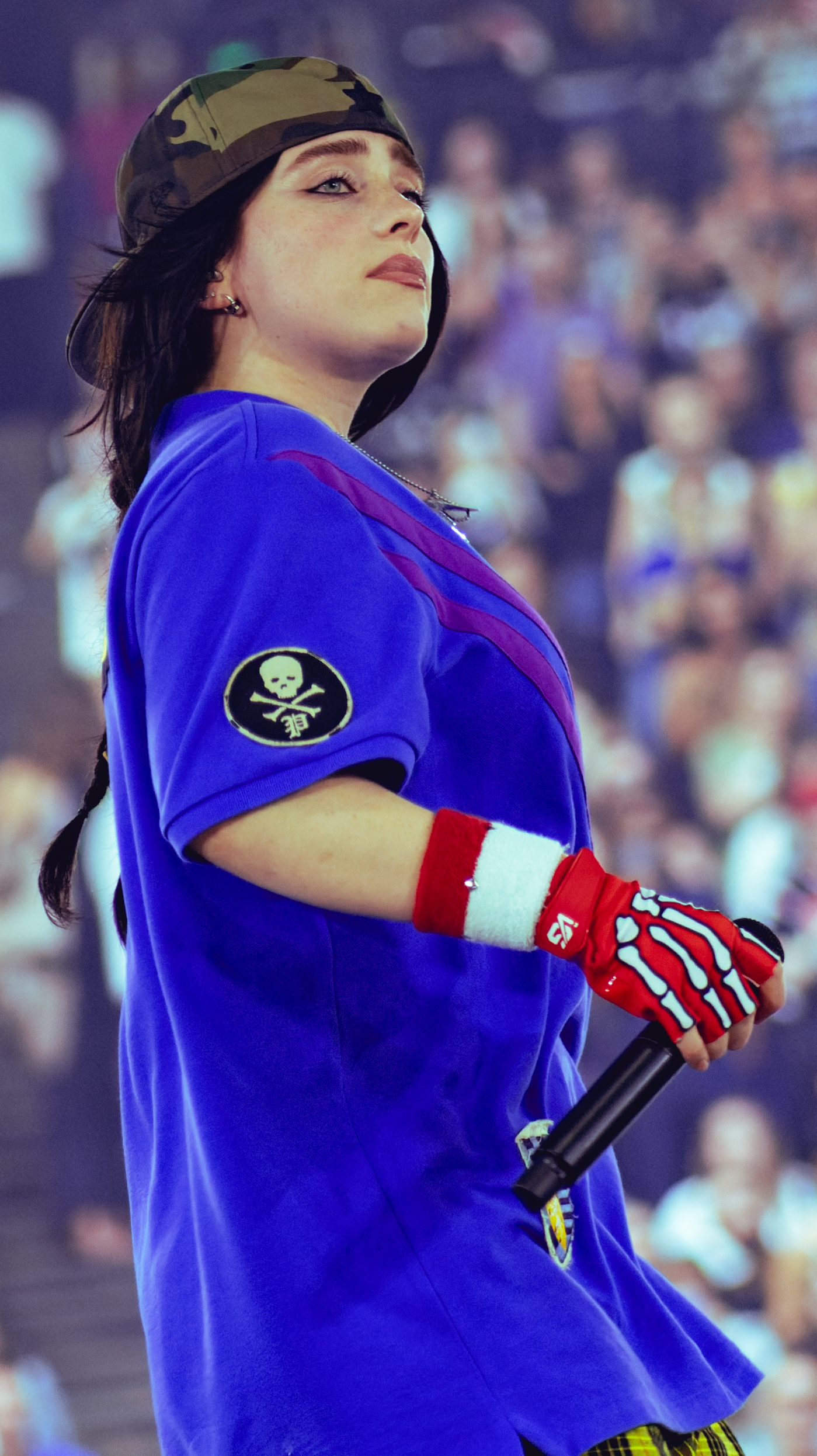
Eilish during Hit Me Hard and Soft: The Tour in July 2025

On April 29, 2024, Eilish announced Hit Me Hard and Soft: The Tour, her seventh concert tour, in support of the album. The first North American leg began on September 29, 2024, at the Videotron Centre in Quebec City, Canada. The 2025 leg, covering Europe and Oceania, started on February 18 at the Brisbane Entertainment Centre in Brisbane, Australia, and concluded on November 23 at Chase Center in San Francisco, United States.

=== Singles and music videos ===
"Lunch" was released as the lead single in tandem with the album's release, along with a music video directed by Eilish herself. The song debuted and peaked at number five on the US Billboard Hot 100. It also saw international success, peaking within the top five in the UK, Germany, Australia and New Zealand, and various European countries.

An extended version of "L'Amour de Ma Vie", subtitled "Over Now", was released as a promotional single on May 22, 2024.

The music video for "Chihiro", also directed by Eilish herself, was released on June 6, 2024. The song debuted at number 12 on the Billboard Hot 100 and charted for 20 weeks due to its streaming success, despite not receiving an official single release in the US. It was sent to Italian radio on January 16, 2025.

"Birds of a Feather" impacted US contemporary hit radio as the second official single on June 18, 2024. The music video for the song, directed by Aidan Zamiri, was released on September 27, 2024. The song was initially a fan favorite, debuting at number 13 on the Billboard Hot 100 and organically rising into the top ten in subsequent weeks. It eventually grew into a worldwide success, peaking at number two on the chart and number one on the Global 200. The song also became Spotify's most-streamed song in a calendar year in 2024, surpassing Sabrina Carpenter's "Espresso". It was nominated for Song of the Year, Record of the Year, and Best Pop Solo Performance at the 67th Annual Grammy Awards in 2025.

"Wildflower" impacted US contemporary hit radio as the fourth single on March 4, 2025.

== Critical reception ==
Professional ratings
Aggregate scores
| Source | Rating |
|---|---|
| AnyDecentMusic? | 8.4/10 |
| Metacritic | 89/100 |
Review scores
| Source | Rating |
| AllMusic | 4.5/5 stars |
| Clash | 8/10 |
| The Daily Telegraph | 5/5 stars |
| The Guardian | 4/5 stars |
| The Independent | 5/5 stars |
| The Line of Best Fit | 9/10 |
| NME | 4/5 stars |
| Pitchfork | 6.8/10 |
| Rolling Stone | 4/5 stars |
| Slant Magazine | 4.5/5 stars |

Hit Me Hard and Soft received widespread critical acclaim. According to the review aggregator Metacritic, Hit Me Hard and Soft received "universal acclaim" based on a weighted average score of 89 out of 100 from 22 critic scores. In a five-star review, Helen Brown of The Independent praised how it "whispers its way through a marvelous maze of music to deliver some big emotional wallops." Neil McCormick from The Daily Telegraph agreed in his own five-star assessment, opining that the "heartbreak masterpiece" is "rich, strange, smart, sad and wise enough" to stand in comparison with Joni Mitchell's Blue (1971).

Writing for The Guardian, Alexis Petridis complimented Hit Me Hard and Soft's "beautiful" melodies and "distinctive" lyrical touches, but wondered if some of its elements could be "a little too opaque" for its own good. NME's Thomas Smith felt that although Eilish wrote it for herself, she created a record that will "resonate harder" than anything she has done before.

=== Year-end rankings ===
Hit Me Hard and Soft appeared on several publications' rankings of the best albums of 2024. It was placed second by Mesfin Fekadu of The Hollywood Reporter and Page Six; in the top five by BBC, Billboard, Entertainment Weekly, Rolling Stone, Complex, DIY, Hot Press, The Boston Globe, The Guardian, Slant Magazine, and The Forty-Five; and within the top ten by The New Yorker, NME, Los Angeles Times, Mondo Sonoro, The Sunday Times, KCRW, People Esquire Les Inrocks, and Dork. Publications that featured Hit Me Hard and Soft in the top fifteen of their lists include Dazed and The Independent The record was also mentioned in unranked lists by AllMusic, Associated Press, Cosmopolitan, HuffPost, Uproxx, Hypebeast, Vogue, Evening Standard, and Toronto Star.

On individual critics' lists, The Philadelphia Inquirer's Dan DeLuca numbered Hit Me Hard and Soft at the seventh position. It was ranked fourth by Variety's Chris Willman, and fourth and twelfth by The New York Times's Jon Pareles and Jon Caramanica, respectively.

Select year-end rankings for Hit Me Hard and Soft
| Publication/critic | List | Rank | Ref. |
|---|---|---|---|
| BBC | Best Albums of 2024 | 4 | |
| Billboard | The 50 Best Albums of 2024 | 5 | |
| Business Insider | The Best Albums of 2024 | 3 | |
| Complex | The 50 Best Albums of 2024 | 5 | |
| Entertainment Weekly | The 10 Best Albums of 2024 | 4 | |
| Hot Press | 50 Best Albums of 2024 | 4 | |
| People | Top 10 Albums of 2024 | 6 | |
| Rolling Stone | The 100 Best Albums Of 2024 | 5 | |
| Slant Magazine | The 50 Best Albums of 2024 | 3 | |
| The Boston Globe | The 50 Best Albums of 2024 | 3 | |
| The Guardian | The 50 Best Albums of 2024 | 3 | |
| The Hollywood Reporter | The 10 Best Albums of 2024 | 2 | |
| The Philadelphia Inquirer | The 15 Best Albums of 2024 | 7 | |
| The New York Times | Jon Pareles's Best Albums of 2024 | 4 | |
| Variety | Chris Willman's Best Albums of 2024 | 4 | |

== Accolades ==
Awards and nominations for "Hit Me Hard and Soft"
| Year | Award | Category | Result | Ref. |
|---|---|---|---|---|
| 2024 | Los 40 Music Awards | Best International Album | Nominated | |
| 2024 | ARIA Music Awards | Best International Artist | Nominated | |
| 2024 | Danish Music Awards | International Album of the Year | Nominated | |
| 2025 | Grammy Awards | Album of the Year | Nominated | |
| 2025 | Grammy Awards | Best Pop Vocal Album | Nominated | |
| 2025 | GLAAD Media Awards | Outstanding Music Artist | Nominated | |
| 2025 | GAFFA Awards (Denmark) | International Album of the Year | Won | |
| 2025 | GAFFA Awards (Sweden) | International Album of the Year | Won | |
| 2025 | iHeartRadio Music Awards | Album of the Year | Won | |
| 2025 | American Music Awards | Album of the Year | Won | |
| 2025 | American Music Awards | Favorite Pop Album | Won | |

== Commercial performance ==
=== Streaming ===
On its release day, Hit Me Hard and Soft received 72.7 million streams on Spotify globally, becoming Eilish's biggest streaming debut on the platform. It also debuted with over 500 million streams globally during its first week of release, marking her biggest streaming week ever. Upon release, it charted at number one on Apple Music's all-genre albums chart in 138 countries worldwide. Eilish was also named Artist of the Year for 2024. It was the second-most-played album globally on Spotify in 2024, behind Taylor Swift's The Tortured Poets Department. On Deezer, Hit Me Hard and Soft was the most streamed album of the year worldwide. In 2025, it was the third-most-streamed album globally on Spotify.

"Birds of a Feather" was Spotify's most-streamed song in 2024 and second-most-streamed song in 2025. It also broke the record for the fastest song to surpass three billion streams at the time. On March 1, 2026, the album surpassed 10 billion streams on the platform, becoming the fastest album by a female artist to do so. It was Eilish's third record to achieve the feat, after When We All Fall Asleep, Where Do We Go? and Don't Smile at Me (2017). On July 21, 2026, BBC Radio 1 revealed that Hit Me Hard and Soft was the 14th-most-streamed album of the 2020s in the UK, so far.

=== United States ===
Hit Me Hard and Soft debuted at number two on the Billboard 200 with 339,000 album-equivalent units in its opening week, including 193.93 million on-demand streams and 191,000 album sales in its first week. Although it is her first studio album to not debut at number one, it marked Eilish's largest first-week units in the US, as well as highest pure sales. Hit Me Hard and Soft also debuted atop the Billboard Vinyl Albums chart, earning 90,000 units in its first week. It was Eilish's fifth consecutive number one, following Happier Than Ever (2021), Live at Third Man Records (2020), When We All Fall Asleep, Where Do We Go?, and Don't Smile at Me (both 2019). She became the solo woman with the second-most number ones, surpassing Lana Del Rey. With this, Eilish has also spent 27 weeks atop the chart, the second-most overall behind Taylor Swift (52 weeks). All ten tracks debuted in the top 40 of the Billboard Hot 100. On March 14, 2025, Hit Me Hard and Soft was certified double Platinum by the Recording Industry Association of America (RIAA) for moving two million album-equivalent units in the US.

Hit Me Hard and Soft finished as the fifth-best-selling album of 2024 in the US with 2,259,000 equivalent album units—of which 570,000 were pure sales—and also the second-biggest-selling vinyl album of the year with 340,000 copies. Eilish was the year's second-biggest-selling vinyl act, selling 520,000 copies. In 2025, it was the fifth-biggest-selling vinyl of the year, with 192,000 copies. According to Hits, it has moved over 4.2 million in activity since its release.

=== Europe ===
In the United Kingdom, Hit Me Hard and Soft debuted at number one on the UK Albums Chart with 67,100 album-equivalent units. It marked her biggest opening week in the region, surpassing When We All Fall Asleep, Where Do We Go? (48,400 units), and also the second-biggest opening week for an album in 2024. It was certified double Platinum by the British Phonographic Industry (BPI).

In Germany, it debuted atop the German Albums Chart, becoming Eilish's second number one album in the country since Happier Than Ever topped the chart in 2021, and was certified Platinum by the BVMI. In France, Hit Me Hard and Soft entered at the number one spot on the SNEP albums chart with 27,710 units, becoming her second French number-one album. It has since been certified triple Platinum. It became the biggest selling international album and fourth overall in the country, selling 172,965 units in 2024. It was also the biggest selling vinyl of the year, with 42,085 copies sold. In 2025, Hit Me Hard and Soft sold 151,107 units in France and was once again the biggest selling vinyl of the year, ahead of Taylor Swift's The Life of a Showgirl. In Spain, it debuted atop the albums chart published by Productores de Música de España, making it Eilish's second number-one album in the country, and was certified Platinum.

=== Other markets ===
In Australia, Hit Me Hard and Soft debuted at the top spot on the ARIA Albums Chart, marking Eilish's third album in a row to accomplish this feat in the country. Three of its songs reached the top ten on the ARIA Singles Chart; "Lunch", "Chihiro", and "Birds of a Feather" charted at numbers five, seven, and nine, respectively. Hit Me Hard and Soft topped the ARIA Albums Chart for five non-consecutive weeks in 2024. In March 2025, following the sold out Australian shows of the Hit Me Hard and Soft: The Tour, it returned to number one on the ARIA Albums Chart for a sixth non-consecutive week, marking the first time since mid-July 2024.

On the New Zealand Albums Chart, Hit Me Hard and Soft arrived at number one, and four of its songs reached the top ten of the New Zealand Singles Chart; "Lunch", "Chihiro", "Birds of a Feather", and "Skinny" charted at numbers three, six, nine, and ten, respectively. Hit Me Hard and Soft spent ten non-consecutive weeks atop the chart and was certified triple Platinum by the RMNZ.

In Brazil, all ten tracks from Hit Me Hard and Soft debuted on the Billboard Brasil Hot 100. Additionally, Eilish became the first international artist to top the Artistas 25. It was certified Diamond by Pro-Música Brasil.

According to the International Federation of the Phonographic Industry (IFPI), Hit Me Hard and Soft was the second-most-consumed album of 2024 worldwide; it also ranked second in vinyl sales, with 612,000 sold, and fifth in streams. In 2025, Hit Me Hard and Soft was the eighth-most-consumed album of the year according to the IFPI. It also ranked fifth in vinyl sales, with 428,000 sold, and sixth in streams.

== Impact and legacy ==
In 2026, Spotify listed Hit Me Hard and Soft as one of the 30 classic pop albums of the streaming era as part of their Spotify Classics, a program that highlights albums and songs whose influence extends beyond charts, trends, and momentary success. The audio streaming service added: "In a streaming era built on shuffling and cherry-picking, Eilish pushed against the norm, hosting arena-sized listening parties so fans could experience the record as intended. The album broke pop release rules by dropping without a lead single, letting audiences discover their own favorites organically."

== Track listing ==
All tracks are written by Billie Eilish O'Connell and Finneas O'Connell.

Hit Me Hard and Soft track listing
| No. | Title | Length |
|---|---|---|
| 1. | "Skinny" | 3:39 |
| 2. | "Lunch" | 3:00 |
| 3. | "Chihiro" | 5:03 |
| 4. | "Birds of a Feather" | 3:30 |
| 5. | "Wildflower" | 4:21 |
| 6. | "The Greatest" | 4:53 |
| 7. | "L'Amour de Ma Vie" | 5:33 |
| 8. | "The Diner" | 3:06 |
| 9. | "Bittersuite" | 4:58 |
| 10. | "Blue" | 5:43 |
| Total length: | | 43:45 |

Japanese CD anniversary edition track listing
| No. | Title | Length |
|---|---|---|
| 11. | "L'Amour de Ma Vie" ("Over Now" extended edit) | 4:31 |
| 12. | "The Greatest" (live acoustic) | 4:40 |
| 13. | "Wildflower" (live acoustic) | 4:22 |
| 14. | "Birds of a Feather" (live acoustic) | 3:29 |
| Total length: | | 61:47 |

=== Notes ===
- Three limited digital editions were released: the first edition included all standard edition tracks alongside isolated vocal versions, a second edition included sped-up versions, and a third edition included slowed and reverbed versions. The isolated vocal versions were later released standalone on vinyl.

== Personnel ==
- Attacca Quartet – strings
  - Amy Schroeder – violin
  - Domenic Salerni – violin
  - Nathan Schram – viola
  - Andrew Yee – cello
- Dale Becker – mastering
- Thom Beemer – string engineering
- David Campbell – string orchestration
- Jon Castelli – mixing
- Billie Eilish – vocals, keyboards, synthesizer, glockenspiel, vocal editing, engineering
- Finneas O'Connell – vocals, keyboards, synthesizer, glockenspiel, drums, guitar, bass, programming, arrangement, orchestration, production, engineering, vocal editing, string arrangements, scoring
- Aron Forbes – mixing, engineering
- Katie Harvey – mastering assistance
- Brad Lauchert – mix engineering
- Andrew Marshall – drums, percussion
- Noah McCorkle – mastering assistance
- Chaz Sexton – drum engineering
- Sharif Shannon – mix engineering

== Charts ==
=== Weekly charts ===
Weekly chart performance for Hit Me Hard and Soft
| Chart (2024–2025) | Peak position |
|---|---|
| Argentine Albums (CAPIF) | 1 |
| Australian Albums (ARIA) | 1 |
| Austrian Albums (Ö3 Austria) | 1 |
| Belgian Albums (Ultratop Flanders) | 1 |
| Belgian Albums (Ultratop Wallonia) | 1 |
| Canadian Albums (Billboard) | 1 |
| Croatian International Albums (HDU) | 2 |
| Czech Albums (ČNS IFPI) | 1 |
| Danish Albums (Hitlisten) | 1 |
| Dutch Albums (Album Top 100) | 1 |
| Finnish Albums (Suomen virallinen lista) | 1 |
| French Albums (SNEP) | 1 |
| German Albums (Offizielle Top 100) | 1 |
| German Pop Albums (Offizielle Top 100) | 1 |
| Greek Albums (IFPI) | 2 |
| Hungarian Albums (MAHASZ) | 1 |
| Icelandic Albums (Tónlistinn) | 1 |
| Irish Albums (Official Charts) | 1 |
| Italian Albums (FIMI) | 2 |
| Japanese Albums (Oricon) | 12 |
| Japanese Combined Albums (Oricon) | 16 |
| Japanese Hot Albums (Billboard Japan) | 15 |
| Lithuanian Albums (AGATA) | 1 |
| New Zealand Albums (RMNZ) | 1 |
| Nigerian Albums (TurnTable) | 39 |
| Norwegian Albums (VG-lista) | 1 |
| Polish Albums (ZPAV) | 1 |
| Portuguese Albums (AFP) | 1 |
| Scottish Albums (Official Charts) | 1 |
| Slovak Albums (ČNS IFPI) | 1 |
| Spanish Albums (Promusicae) | 1 |
| Swedish Albums (Sverigetopplistan) | 1 |
| Swiss Albums (Schweizer Hitparade) | 1 |
| UK Albums (Official Charts) | 1 |
| US Billboard 200 | 2 |
| US Top Rock & Alternative Albums (Billboard) | 1 |

=== Monthly charts ===
Monthly chart performance for Hit Me Hard and Soft
| Chart (2024) | Position |
|---|---|
| Japanese Albums (Oricon) | 40 |

=== Year-end charts ===
2024 year-end chart performance for Hit Me Hard and Soft
| Chart (2024) | Position |
|---|---|
| Australian Albums (ARIA) | 2 |
| Austrian Albums (Ö3 Austria) | 2 |
| Belgian Albums (Ultratop Flanders) | 2 |
| Belgian Albums (Ultratop Wallonia) | 1 |
| Canadian Albums (Billboard) | 13 |
| Croatian International Albums (HDU) | 10 |
| Czech Albums (ČNS IFPI) | 5 |
| Danish Albums (Hitlisten) | 3 |
| Dutch Albums (Album Top 100) | 2 |
| French Albums (SNEP) | 4 |
| German Albums (Offizielle Top 100) | 2 |
| Global Albums (IFPI) | 2 |
| Hungarian Albums (MAHASZ) | 7 |
| Icelandic Albums (Tónlistinn) | 2 |
| Italian Albums (FIMI) | 23 |
| New Zealand Albums (RMNZ) | 2 |
| Polish Albums (ZPAV) | 2 |
| Portuguese Albums (AFP) | 2 |
| Slovak Albums (ČNS IFPI) | 1 |
| Spanish Albums (Promusicae) | 11 |
| Swedish Albums (Sverigetopplistan) | 3 |
| Swiss Albums (Schweizer Hitparade) | 2 |
| UK Albums (OCC) | 5 |
| US Billboard 200 | 11 |
| US Top Rock & Alternative Albums (Billboard) | 3 |

2025 year-end chart performance for Hit Me Hard and Soft
| Chart (2025) | Position |
|---|---|
| Australian Albums (ARIA) | 4 |
| Austrian Albums (Ö3 Austria) | 4 |
| Belgian Albums (Ultratop Flanders) | 3 |
| Belgian Albums (Ultratop Wallonia) | 5 |
| Canadian Albums (Billboard) | 11 |
| Danish Albums (Hitlisten) | 4 |
| Dutch Albums (Album Top 100) | 4 |
| French Albums (SNEP) | 15 |
| German Albums (Offizielle Top 100) | 4 |
| Global Albums (IFPI) | 8 |
| Hungarian Albums (MAHASZ) | 10 |
| Icelandic Albums (Tónlistinn) | 4 |
| Italian Albums (FIMI) | 49 |
| New Zealand Albums (RMNZ) | 8 |
| Polish Albums (ZPAV) | 3 |
| Slovakia Albums (ČNS IFPI) | 10 |
| Spanish Albums (Promusicae) | 33 |
| Swedish Albums (Sverigetopplistan) | 3 |
| Swiss Albums (Schweizer Hitparade) | 5 |
| UK Albums (OCC) | 17 |
| US Billboard 200 | 9 |
| US Top Album Sales (Billboard) | 10 |
| US Top Rock & Alternative Albums (Billboard) | 1 |

== Certifications and sales ==
Certifications and sales for Hit Me Hard and Soft
| Region | Certification | Certified units/sales |
|---|---|---|
| Australia (ARIA) | 2× Platinum | 140,000^{‡} |
| Austria (IFPI Austria) | Platinum | 15,000^{‡} |
| Belgium (BRMA) | 3× Platinum | 60,000^{‡} |
| Brazil (Pro-Música Brasil) | Diamond | 160,000^{‡} |
| Canada (Music Canada) | 4× Platinum | 320,000^{‡} |
| Denmark (IFPI Danmark) | 4× Platinum | 80,000^{‡} |
| France (SNEP) | 3× Platinum | 300,000^{‡} |
| Germany (BVMI) | 3× Gold | 225,000^{‡} |
| Iceland (FHF) | — | 6,007 |
| Italy (FIMI) | Platinum | 50,000^{‡} |
| Netherlands (NVPI) | Platinum | 37,200^{‡} |
| New Zealand (RMNZ) | 4× Platinum | 60,000^{‡} |
| Poland (ZPAV) | 3× Platinum | 60,000^{‡} |
| Portugal (AFP) | 4× Platinum | 28,000^{‡} |
| Spain (Promusicae) | Platinum | 40,000^{‡} |
| Sweden (GLF) | 2× Platinum | 60,000^{‡} |
| Switzerland (IFPI Switzerland) | Gold | 10,000^{‡} |
| United Kingdom (BPI) | 2× Platinum | 600,000^{‡} |
| United States (RIAA) | 2× Platinum | 2,000,000^{‡} |
Streaming
| Central America (CFC) | Platinum | 7,000,000^{†} |
^{‡} Sales+streaming figures based on certification alone.^{†} Streaming-only figures based on certification alone.

== Release history ==
Hit Me Hard and Soft release history
| Region | Date | Format(s) | Edition(s) | Label(s) | Ref. |
|---|---|---|---|---|---|
| Various | May 17, 2024 | Cassette; CD; digital download; streaming; vinyl LP | Standard | Darkroom; Interscope | |
| United States | May 19, 2024 | Digital download | Isolated vocals | Darkroom; Interscope | |
| United States | May 22, 2024 | Digital download | Slowed and reverb; sped-up | Darkroom; Interscope | |
| Various | November 29, 2024 | Vinyl LP | Isolated vocals | Darkroom; Interscope | |
| Japan | August 1, 2025 | CD | Japanese Anniversary Edition | Darkroom; Interscope | |

== See also ==
- List of 2024 albums
- List of number-one albums in Norway
- List of number-one albums from the 2020s (New Zealand)
- List of number-one albums of 2024 (Australia)
- List of number-one albums of 2024 (Belgium)
- List of number-one albums of 2024 (Canada)
- List of number-one albums of 2024 (Finland)
- List of number-one albums of 2024 (Ireland)
- List of number-one albums of 2024 (Poland)
- List of number-one albums of 2024 (Portugal)
- List of number-one albums of 2024 (Spain)
- List of number-one singles and albums in Sweden
- List of Spotify streaming records
- List of UK Albums Chart number ones of the 2020s
