= Blue (Billie Eilish song) =

Song by Billie Eilish

from the album Hit Me Hard and Soft
- Written: 2015; 2020–2021; 2023
- Released: May 17, 2024
- Genre: Indie rock; synth-pop
- Length: 5:43
- Label: Darkroom; Interscope
- Songwriters: Billie O'Connell; Finneas O'Connell
- Producer: Finneas

Lyric video
- "Blue" on YouTube

"Blue" is a song by American singer-songwriter Billie Eilish from her third studio album, Hit Me Hard and Soft (2024). Written by Eilish and her brother Finneas O'Connell, who also produced the track, it is a reworking of "True Blue" and "Born Blue", two outtakes from her 2017 EP Don't Smile at Me and her 2021 album Happier Than Ever, respectively.

== Background and release ==
The song is a reworking of two tracks Eilish had previously written, "True Blue" and "Born Blue". "True Blue" was one of the first songs she and Finneas had ever written, after "Ocean Eyes", which she performed along with that song in some of her earliest performances. In February 2022, the song was leaked online and went viral on TikTok, leading Eilish to decide to complete and release a finalized version of it.

"Born Blue" was a song that the siblings started writing for Happier Than Ever (2021), initially putting it on an early draft of the tracklist, but they ended up only writing a few lines for the song and never finishing it. They decided to combine both "True Blue" and "Born Blue" to reflect how they felt while writing Hit Me Hard and Soft and subsequently retitled the song to simply "Blue".

== Music and lyrics ==
The song starts with an ethereal tone, discussing feelings of sadness and heartbreak as well as referencing every song in the album, and then moves into a dark section with her voice being distorted to a deeper octave.

The melody is used as a leitmotif throughout the album to tie the themes together and make the album feel more cohesive. The melody of "Born Blue" can be heard in the tracks "Skinny" and "The Greatest", and the melody of "True Blue" is in the outro to "Bittersuite" leading into the beginning of this song.

A "soft" indie rock and synth-pop song, "Blue" ends with the line "But when can I hear the next one", which has led to speculation that this was hinting towards a sister project or sequel to Hit Me Hard and Soft.

Critics' year-end rankings of "Blue"
Publication	List	Rank	Ref.
Spectrum Culture	The 25 Best Songs of 2024	23	

== Charts ==
=== Weekly charts ===
Weekly chart performance for "Blue"
Chart (2024)	Peak position
Australia (ARIA)	20
Belgium (Billboard)	14
Brazil Hot 100 (Billboard)	66
Canada Hot 100 (Billboard)	23
Czech Republic Singles Digital (ČNS IFPI)	9
France (SNEP)	44
Germany (GfK)	57
Global 200 (Billboard)	18
Greece International (IFPI)	18
Hungary (Single Top 40)	34
Iceland (Tónlistinn)	32
Israel (Mako Hitlist)	75
Latvia Streaming (LaIPA)	14
Lithuania (AGATA)	19
Luxembourg (Billboard)	18
MENA (IFPI)	9
New Zealand (Recorded Music NZ)	13
Norway (VG-lista)	21
Poland (Polish Streaming Top 100)	23
Portugal (AFP)	14
Saudi Arabia (IFPI)	8
Slovakia Singles Digital (ČNS IFPI)	16
South Africa (TOSAC)	39
Spain (Promusicae)	91
Sweden (Sverigetopplistan)	54
UK (Billboard)	19
UK Audio Streaming (Official Charts)	22
UK Singles Downloads (Official Charts)	68
US Billboard Hot 100	25
US Hot Rock & Alternative Songs (Billboard)	10

=== Year-end charts ===
Year-end chart performance for "Blue"
Chart (2024)	Position
US Hot Rock & Alternative Songs (Billboard)	28

== Certifications ==
Certifications for "Blue"
Region	Certification	Certified units/sales
Australia (ARIA)	Platinum	70,000^{‡}
Austria (IFPI Austria)	Gold	15,000^{‡}
Belgium (BRMA)	Gold	20,000^{‡}
Brazil (Pro-Música Brasil)	Diamond	160,000^{‡}
Canada (Music Canada)	Platinum	80,000^{‡}
France (SNEP)	Gold	100,000^{‡}
New Zealand (RMNZ)	Platinum	30,000^{‡}
Poland (ZPAV)	Gold	25,000^{‡}
United Kingdom (BPI)	Silver	200,000^{‡}
United States (RIAA)	Gold	500,000^{‡}
^{‡} Sales+streaming figures based on certification alone.
