= Wildflower (Billie Eilish song) =

2025 single by Billie Eilish

Single by Billie Eilish

from the album Hit Me Hard and Soft
- Released: March 4, 2025
- Genre: Folk-pop
- Length: 4:21
- Label: Darkroom; Interscope
- Songwriters: Billie Eilish; Finneas O'Connell
- Producer: Finneas O'Connell

Billie Eilish singles chronology
"Chihiro" (2025)	"Wildflower" (2025)

Lyric video
- "Wildflower" on YouTube

"Wildflower" is a song by American singer-songwriter Billie Eilish and the fourth single from her third studio album, Hit Me Hard and Soft (2024). She wrote it with her brother and its producer, Finneas O'Connell. A folk-pop track, "Wildflower" sees Eilish consoling her friend after a breakup only to later begin dating the friend's ex-boyfriend, and the guilt she felt as a result. It was serviced to contemporary hit radio in the United States by Darkroom and Interscope Records on March 4, 2025.

"Wildflower" charted within the top 10 in Greece, Malaysia, Portugal, the Middle East and North Africa, and the United Kingdom and peaked at number 17 on the US Billboard Hot 100. It was certified quadruple platinum in New Zealand, Portugal, and the United States and quintuple platinum in Australia and Canada. At the 68th Annual Grammy Awards, "Wildflower" was nominated for Record of the Year and won Song of the Year, setting a record for Eilish and O'Connell for the most wins in the category. They also tied Adele, Bruno Mars, and Paul Simon for the most General Field wins, with seven each.

== Promotion ==
In July 2024, Eilish performed "Wildflower" in her episode of the Amazon Music series Songline. It was also part of her A Colors Show episode on September 18. The performance marked her return to the show after her first appearance in August 2017, which was seen as a milestone that helped shape her subsequent breakthrough. On October 19, Eilish performed the song on Saturday Night Live, accompanied by her brother, Finneas O'Connell, on an acoustic guitar.

== Composition and reception ==
"Wildflower" has been described as a folk-pop song. Although Eilish never clarified who it is about, it was later reported that multiple lines allude to her relationship with Devon Lee Carlson, the ex-girlfriend of Jesse Rutherford whom Eilish dated from October 2022 to May 2023. The title is believed to be a reference to Wildflower Cases, a company founded by Carlson. In a deeper analysis, Alex Hopper of American Songwriter opined that "Wildflower" serves as a "pseudo apology" to Carlson, in which Eilish depicts the end of their relationship. It showcases the singer as a "candid and honest" songwriter who does not shy away from highlighting her "rough edges".

Billboard writer Hannah Dailey ranked "Wildflower" as her favorite song from its parent album. According to Dailey, the "soulful and gloomy" track encompasses "some of Eilish's most mature songwriting yet", crafted to make "a complex story look simple" as she obsesses over her partner's ex-girlfriend. In an interview with Elle published on April 28, 2026, Eilish stated that she drew inspiration from Arabic music while composing the song. She specifically cited Lebanese pop singer Nancy Ajram as an influence, noting that Ajram's melodic style and emotive vocal delivery contributed to shaping the song's musical direction and atmosphere.

== Commercial performance ==
In the United States, "Wildflower" debuted at number 17 on the Billboard Hot 100 as a non-single track on June 1, 2024. Due to consistent streaming numbers, it slowly climbed the charts again months later, then was released as Hit Me Hard and Soft's fourth single on March 4, 2025. With a chart run of 72 weeks, it became Eilish's longest-charting song on the Billboard Hot 100, surpassing "Birds of a Feather"'s 67 weeks. It became the longest-charting female solo song in the chart's history, surpassing SZA's "Snooze" (70 weeks). "Wildflower" has also spent over a year on Billboard's Hot Rock & Alternative Songs, Hot Rock Songs, Hot Alternative Songs, Rock Streaming Songs, and Alternative Streaming Songs charts.

In the United Kingdom, "Wildflower" entered at number 50 on the UK Singles Chart dated July 31, 2024. It peaked at number seven during its 17th week on the chart, dated November 20, 2024, and had a chart run of 47 weeks. In Australia, it reached number 14 on the ARIA Singles Chart with a run of 45 weeks. It charted for 55 weeks on the Official New Zealand Music Chart, where it peaked at number 11. "Wildflower" received a quintuple platinum certification in Australia and Canada, quadruple platinum in the United States, New Zealand, and Portugal and double platinum the United Kingdom.

On streaming platforms, "Wildflower" was the ninth most-streamed song globally on Apple Music in 2025, jumping 50 positions from its 2024 placement. On Spotify, "Wildflower" was the tenth most-streamed song worldwide.

== Accolades ==
Awards and nominations
Year	Award	Category	Result	Ref.
2025	Hollywood Music Video Awards	Best Live Performance (Note: The winning recipient is for Amazon Music's Songline performance.)	Won	
2025	Nickelodeon Kids' Choice Awards	Favorite Song	Nominated	
2026	Grammy Awards	Record of the Year	Nominated	
2026	Grammy Awards	Song of the Year	Won	

== Charts ==
=== Weekly charts ===
Weekly chart performance
Chart (2024–2026)	Peak position
Australia (ARIA)	14
Austria (Ö3 Austria Top 40)	24
Belgium (Ultratop 50 Flanders)	45
Belgium (Ultratop 50 Wallonia)	34
Brazil (Brasil Hot 100)	62
Canada Hot 100 (Billboard)	20
Canada CHR/Top 40 (Billboard)	23
Czech Republic Singles Digital (ČNS IFPI)	17
Denmark (Tracklisten)	30
France (SNEP)	42
Germany (GfK)	38
Global 200 (Billboard)	11
Greece International (IFPI)	7
Iceland (Tónlistinn)	25
Indonesia (IFPI)	14
Ireland (IRMA)	11
Israel (Mako Hitlist)	37
Japan Hot Overseas (Billboard Japan)	13
Latvia Streaming (LaIPA)	12
Lebanon (Lebanese Top 20)	11
Lithuania (AGATA)	13
Luxembourg (Billboard)	16
Malaysia (IFPI)	5
Malaysia International (RIM)	2
Middle East and North Africa (IFPI)	5
Netherlands (Single Top 100)	22
New Zealand (Recorded Music NZ)	11
Norway (VG-lista)	19
Panama Streaming (PRODUCE)	116
Philippines (Philippines Hot 100)	46
Poland (Polish Streaming Top 100)	26
Portugal (AFP)	7
Saudi Arabia (IFPI)	2
Singapore (RIAS)	11
Slovakia Singles Digital (ČNS IFPI)	22
Spain (Promusicae)	76
Sweden (Sverigetopplistan)	34
Switzerland (Schweizer Hitparade)	14
United Arab Emirates (IFPI)	9
UK Singles (Official Charts)	7
US Billboard Hot 100	17
US Adult Contemporary (Billboard)	26
US Adult Pop Airplay (Billboard)	10
US Hot Rock & Alternative Songs (Billboard)	4
US Pop Airplay (Billboard)	11

=== Monthly charts ===
Monthly chart performance
Chart (2026)	Peak position
Panama Streaming (PRODUCE)	150

=== Year-end charts ===
2024 year-end chart performance
Chart (2024)	Position
Australia (ARIA)	70
Canada (Canadian Hot 100)	77
Global 200 (Billboard)	133
Iceland (Tónlistinn)	61
Israel (Galgalatz)	14
Netherlands (Single Top 100)	92
New Zealand (Recorded Music NZ)	41
Portugal (AFP)	74
Switzerland (Schweizer Hitparade)	89
UK Singles (OCC)	66
US Billboard Hot 100	89
US Hot Rock & Alternative Songs (Billboard)	14

2025 year-end chart performance
Chart (2025)	Position
Australia (ARIA)	33
Belgium (Ultratop 50 Flanders)	91
Belgium (Ultratop 50 Wallonia)	59
Canada (Canadian Hot 100)	74
Canada CHR/Top 40 (Billboard)	66
France (SNEP)	121
Global 200 (Billboard)	13
Iceland (Tónlistinn)	61
Netherlands (Single Top 100)	62
New Zealand (Recorded Music NZ)	23
Puerto Rico Anglo Airplay (Monitor Latino)	18
Sweden (Sverigetopplistan)	78
Switzerland (Schweizer Hitparade)	27
UK Singles (OCC)	56
US Billboard Hot 100	26
US Adult Pop Airplay (Billboard)	48
US Hot Rock & Alternative Songs (Billboard)	4
US Pop Airplay (Billboard)	40

== Certifications ==
Certifications
Region	Certification	Certified units/sales
Australia (ARIA)	5× Platinum	350,000^{‡}
Austria (IFPI Austria)	Platinum	30,000^{‡}
Belgium (BRMA)	Platinum	40,000^{‡}
Brazil (Pro-Música Brasil)	5× Diamond	800,000^{‡}
Canada (Music Canada)	5× Platinum	400,000^{‡}
Denmark (IFPI Danmark)	Platinum	90,000^{‡}
France (SNEP)	Diamond	333,333^{‡}
Germany (BVMI)	Gold	300,000^{‡}
Italy (FIMI)	Gold	100,000^{‡}
New Zealand (RMNZ)	4× Platinum	120,000^{‡}
Poland (ZPAV)	Platinum	50,000^{‡}
Portugal (AFP)	4× Platinum	40,000^{‡}
Spain (Promusicae)	Platinum	100,000^{‡}
Switzerland (IFPI Switzerland)	Platinum	30,000^{‡}
United Kingdom (BPI)	2× Platinum	1,200,000^{‡}
United States (RIAA)	4× Platinum	4,000,000^{‡}
Streaming
Central America (CFC)	2× Platinum	14,000,000^{†}
Greece (IFPI Greece)	3× Platinum	6,000,000^{†}
^{‡} Sales+streaming figures based on certification alone.^{†} Streaming-only figures based on certification alone.

== Release history ==
Release dates and formats
Region	Date	Format	Label(s)	Ref.
United States	March 4, 2025	Contemporary hit radio	Darkroom; Interscope	
Italy	August 15, 2025	Radio airplay	EMI	

== See also ==
- List of best-selling singles in Brazil
- List of UK top-ten singles in 2024
