= The Greatest (Billie Eilish song) =

2024 song on Hit Me Hard and Soft

Song by Billie Eilish

from the album Hit Me Hard and Soft
- Released: May 17, 2024
- Genre: Arena rock; folk-pop
- Length: 4:53
- Label: Darkroom; Interscope
- Songwriters: Billie O'Connell; Finneas O'Connell
- Producer: Finneas

Lyric video
- "The Greatest" on YouTube

"The Greatest" (stylized in all uppercase) is a song by American singer-songwriter Billie Eilish, and the sixth track from her third studio album, Hit Me Hard and Soft (2024). It was released on May 17, 2024. Commercially, the song reached the top 20 in Australia, New Zealand, Portugal and Global 200, and the top 30 in Canada and the United States. A performance of "The Greatest" live from the Stephen Colbert Show (2024) can be found on Youtube.

== Music and lyrics ==
"The Greatest" acts as the sixth track on Hit Me Hard and Soft. The lyrics explore feelings of defeat, loneliness, anger, and mourning for what could’ve been. Eilish evokes these emotions as she explores her frustration with a past partner, for not reciprocating or noticing the effort she put into the relationship. Despite every effort and amount of affection Eilish put in, none of it was appreciated, recognized, or valued by her partner. Which is how "The Greatest" came to be wrote, and later largely appreciated by her listeners who shared similar experiences.

Eilish uses soft string sounds in the bridge, which add depth and emotion to the song. This kind of careful detail is a big part of how her music is changing and growing. Consequence stated this layered production style is becoming a key part of her sound. The use of strings in this song not only elevates the song's dynamic but also reflects the desperation in Eilish's voice. Coupled with the addition of O'Connell's guitar in the background, the song evokes guttural hurt, reflecting Eilish's raw emotion present in the relationship. In a New York Times article, one author recounts hearing Eilish perform this song on her tour. The song was noted as the emotional apex of the show. In the bridge, "Man, am I the greatest," the doomed relationship is reflected upon, and Eilish's suffering is revealed. As the song builds to its conclusion, the melody allows Eilish's defenses to fall away, revealing, "I loved you, and I still do," "Just wanted passion from you, just wanted what I gave you". This conclusion cleanses Eilish of self-doubt about how hard she tried to make it work, but also reveals a twinge of sarcasm toward herself for remaining in this rut of a relationship for so long.

An arena rock and folk-pop song, "The Greatest" was inspired by Eilish's own experiences with one-sided love and feeling emotionally abandoned. In a 2024 interview with NME, she talked about how these personal feelings helped shape the song and the album. By opening up about her own struggles, she makes it easier for listeners to connect with the emotions in her music, especially those who have gone through something similar. People reports the emotions Eilish felt when hearing her fans belt the song during one of her concerts. Eilish claims that hearing the crowd made her reflect on her purpose as an artist. Seeing her music have a real impact on her audience reaffirmed her and Finneas' creative spirit.

== Relation to Other Works ==
Strings featured behind the vocals in the bridge follow the melody of those same lyrics, and are interpolated in different keys into the outros of both the opening and closing tracks, “Skinny” and “Blue.”

"The Greatest" has been compared to Eilish's older songs, but some critics think it sounds more grown-up and confident. It shows how much she's changed and gotten better over time. In a 2024 review, Variety said the song is a big step forward for her as an artist. They also note this song is the most successful dramatic song on the album. The album, as a whole, has been referred as her most experimental, both thematically and production-wise. The raw emotion found in this album, especially in "The Greatest", is what sets "Hit Me Hard and Soft" apart from her previous albums.

== Charts ==
=== Weekly Charts ===
Weekly Chart Performance For "The Greatest"
Chart (2024–2025)	Peak position
Australia (ARIA)	18
Belgium (Billboard)	19
Brazil Hot 100 (Billboard)	72
Canada Hot 100 (Billboard)	27
Czech Republic Singles Digital (ČNS IFPI)	18
France (SNEP)	50
Global 200 (Billboard)	20
Greece International Streaming (IFPI)	25
Iceland (Tónlistinn)	30
Israel (Mako Hitlist)	76
Lithuania (AGATA)	29
New Zealand (Recorded Music NZ)	16
Norway (VG-lista)	38
Poland (Polish Streaming Top 100)	36
Portugal (AFP)	12
Slovakia Singles Digital (ČNS IFPI)	31
South Africa (TOSAC)	53
Spain (Promusicae)	89
Sweden (Sverigetopplistan)	76
UK Singles (Official Charts)	69
UK Streaming (OCC)	22
US Billboard Hot 100	24
US Hot Rock & Alternative Songs (Billboard)	9

== Certifications ==
Certifications for "The Greatest"
Region	Certification	Certified units/sales
Australia (ARIA)	Platinum	70,000^{‡}
Brazil (Pro-Música Brasil)	Diamond	160,000^{‡}
Canada (Music Canada)	2× Platinum	160,000^{‡}
Denmark (IFPI Danmark)	Gold	45,000^{‡}
France (SNEP)	Gold	100,000^{‡}
New Zealand (RMNZ)	Platinum	30,000^{‡}
United Kingdom (BPI)	Gold	400,000^{‡}
United States (RIAA)	Platinum	1,000,000^{‡}
^{‡} Sales+streaming figures based on certification alone.
