= Lunch (song) =

Single by Billie Eilish

from the album Hit Me Hard and Soft
- Written: October 2022 – 2023 (Note: For Alt 98.7 FM, Eilish revealed that the chorus of "Lunch" was written in October 2022, and the song was finished in Fall of 2023.)
- Released: May 17, 2024
- Recorded: 2023
- Genre: Electro; post-punk; synth-pop; synth-rock
- Length: 3:00
- Label: Darkroom; Interscope
- Songwriters: Billie Eilish O'Connell; Finneas O'Connell
- Producer: Finneas

Billie Eilish singles chronology
"What Was I Made For?" (2023)	"Lunch" (2024)	"Birds of a Feather" (2024)

Music video
- "Lunch" on YouTube

"Lunch" is a song by American singer-songwriter Billie Eilish and the lead single from her third studio album, Hit Me Hard and Soft (2024). It was released on May 17, 2024, the same day as the album. The song features a heavy bassline and lyrics that detail Eilish's same-sex sexual attraction, following her public confirmation that she liked both men and women. In the lyrics, which she wrote after realizing that she wanted to try cunnilingus, she describes that desire (and her general sexual appetite), saying she "could eat that girl for lunch".

== Background ==
Speculation around Eilish's sexual orientation began when she released the music video for the single "Lost Cause" in 2021. The video features Eilish at a slumber party with several women, doing various activities such as twerking, playing Twister, and spraying silly string. Many fans and media outlets saw the video as homoerotic, while others accused her of queerbaiting. In response, Eilish posted behind-the-scenes pictures from the video on Instagram with the caption "I love girls".

In November 2023, Eilish appeared for a Variety cover story, in which she discussed her relationship to sexuality and womanhood, as well as her frustration with people speculating on her sexual orientation. She said that she had always felt an emotional attraction to women alongside physical attraction, admitting that she can be overawed with women she found beautiful. A month later, during a red carpet for the magazine's "Hitmakers" event, a reporter asked Eilish if her comments during her interview were meant as a coming out statement, to which she said that it was not the intention and that she thought her sexual orientation was already obvious. When the event concluded, she took to Instagram to criticize the reporter for their question, accusing them of outing her and confirming she liked both men and women.

== Music and lyrics ==
During a 2024 Rolling Stone interview, Eilish spoke more about her sexual orientation while discussing her third studio album, Hit Me Hard and Soft, and her creative process behind one of its songs. She said that writing "Lunch" helped her explore and confirm her same-gender attraction. She created "Lunch" before her first sexual encounter with a woman and completed the song thereafter, fueled by the realization that she "wanted [her] face in a vagina".

The song has been described as electro, post-punk, synth-pop, and synth-rock. Set over a heavy bassline, the song discusses Eilish's strong sexual desire for a woman and compares sex with her to eating lunch. In the chorus, she describes how the woman tastes as she "dances on [Eilish's] tongue" and calls the experience irresistible. Allison Hope of CNN called the songwriting bold, comparing the provocative nature to activist Marsha P. Johnson's involvement at the 1969 Stonewall Inn riots in New York City.

== Release and reception ==
Eilish debuted "Lunch" alongside two other songs from Hit Me Hard and Soft during a secret DJ set and party at Coachella 2024, called "Do Labs". "Lunch" is the second track on the album and was released concurrently as its lead single on May 17, 2024. The song was released to contemporary hit, hot adult contemporary, and alternative radio in the United States, while Universal Music Group promoted it on radio airplay in Italy. The music video for "Lunch", directed by Eilish, premiered via her Vevo channel on YouTube twelve hours after the song's and album's release.

Some music critics opined that "Lunch" is one of the best songs on the album. Kitty Empire from The Observer wrote that the song was "a Sapphic synth-pop banger in which Eilish smacks her lips, wanting to devour someone tasty. Even better, towards the end of the song, the Eilish siblings pull out some of their most dancefloor-facing music to date. It ends too soon, on some panting." Tom Taylor of Far Out described it as "bass-driven lust", adding that the "rhythmic meta" vocal usage recalled "vintage Eilish" and evoked "a sexy sensation", as she sounds more groovy than before.

Critics' year-end rankings of "Lunch"
Publication	List	Rank	Ref.
Billboard	The 100 Best Songs of 2024	39	
DIY	The Best Songs of 2024	17	
Hot Press	50 Best Tracks of 2024	26	
Still Listening	The 50 Best Songs of 2024	15	
The Guardian	The 20 Best Songs of 2024	5	

== Music video ==
An accompanying music video for "Lunch", self-directed by Eilish, was released on May 17, 2024, alongside Hit Me Hard and Soft. The '90s-inspired video features Eilish dancing around in oversized athletic attire while lip-syncing along to the lyrics directly into the camera in front of multi-colored backgrounds. The video also features Eilish using various props, like shuffling playing cards, rolling dice, eating cherries, and laying on a sofa. Eilish wears basketball jerseys, oversized polo shirts, and graphic T-shirts, fitted flat-rimmed caps, and baggy jeans and jean shorts while sporting large neck, teeth, and hand jewelry, reminiscent of the fashion of rappers and hip-hop artists of the 1990s. Eilish expressed that "[The video is] an ode to 90's music videos and all the videos I grew up loving. I've always loved the simplicity of performance takes and I didn't want a lot going on in this video." She also said that the video was inspired by Green Day, Tupac Shakur, and the Spice Girls.

== Accolades ==
Awards and nominations for "Lunch"
Year	Award	Category	Result	Ref.
2024	Las Culturistas Culture Awards	Best Lunch	Nominated	
2024	MTV Video Music Awards	Video of the Year	Nominated	
2025	Music Awards Japan	Best International Alternative Song in Japan	Nominated	

== Charts ==
=== Weekly charts ===
Weekly chart performance for "Lunch"
Chart (2024)	Peak position
Argentina Hot 100 (Billboard)	43
Australia (ARIA)	5
Austria (Ö3 Austria Top 40)	2
Belarus Airplay (TopHit)	92
Belgium (Ultratop 50 Flanders)	2
Belgium (Ultratop 50 Wallonia)	14
Brazil Hot 100 (Billboard)	15
Canada Hot 100 (Billboard)	7
Canada CHR/Top 40 (Billboard)	8
Canada Hot AC (Billboard)	21
Canada Rock (Billboard)	24
CIS Airplay (TopHit)	26
Croatia (Billboard)	10
Croatia International Airplay (Top lista)	16
Czech Republic Airplay (ČNS IFPI)	4
Czech Republic Singles Digital (ČNS IFPI)	1
Denmark (Tracklisten)	6
Estonia Airplay (TopHit)	22
Finland (Suomen virallinen lista)	9
France (SNEP)	16
Germany (GfK)	5
Global 200 (Billboard)	4
Greece International (IFPI)	2
Hong Kong (Billboard)	17
Hungary (Single Top 40)	10
Iceland (Tónlistinn)	2
Ireland (IRMA)	4
Israel (Mako Hitlist)	36
Italy (FIMI)	33
Japan Hot 100 (Billboard)	71
Latvia (LaIPA)	2
Latvia Airplay (LaIPA)	1
Lebanon English Airplay (Lebanese Top 20)	11
Lithuania (AGATA)	1
Luxembourg (Billboard)	6
Malaysia (Billboard)	17
Malaysia International (RIM)	11
MENA (IFPI)	7
Netherlands (Dutch Top 40)	23
Netherlands (Single Top 100)	4
New Zealand (Recorded Music NZ)	2
Nigeria (TurnTable Top 100)	92
Norway (VG-lista)	4
Panama (Monitor Latino)	9
Philippines Hot 100 (Billboard)	62
Poland (Polish Airplay Top 100)	23
Poland (Polish Streaming Top 100)	8
Portugal (AFP)	1
Romania (Billboard)	23
Russia Airplay (TopHit)	46
San Marino (SMRRTV Top 50)	18
Saudi Arabia (IFPI)	12
Singapore (RIAS)	7
Slovakia Airplay (ČNS IFPI)	45
Slovakia Singles Digital (ČNS IFPI)	3
South Africa (TOSAC)	14
South Korea (Circle)	160
Spain (Promusicae)	18
Sweden (Sverigetopplistan)	4
Switzerland (Schweizer Hitparade)	3
Taiwan (Billboard)	19
UAE (IFPI)	7
UK Singles (Official Charts)	2
US Billboard Hot 100	5
US Adult Pop Airplay (Billboard)	12
US Dance Airplay (Billboard)	22
US Hot Rock & Alternative Songs (Billboard)	1
US Pop Airplay (Billboard)	10
US Rock & Alternative Airplay (Billboard)	9
Venezuela (Record Report)	34

=== Monthly charts ===
Monthly chart performance for "Lunch"
Chart (2024)	Position
CIS Airplay (TopHit)	26
Czech Republic (Rádio – Top 100)	25
Estonia Airplay (TopHit)	29
Lithuania Airplay (TopHit)	7
Paraguay (SGP)	51
Russia Airplay (TopHit)	53

=== Year-end charts ===
2024 year-end chart performance for "Lunch"
Chart (2024)	Position
Australia (ARIA)	44
Belgium (Ultratop 50 Flanders)	61
Belgium (Ultratop 50 Wallonia)	81
Canada (Canadian Hot 100)	40
Estonia Airplay (TopHit)	161
Global 200 (Billboard)	84
Iceland (Tónlistinn)	50
Israel International Airplay (Galgalatz)	22
New Zealand (Recorded Music NZ)	47
Portugal (AFP)	80
Switzerland (Schweizer Hitparade)	85
UK Singles (OCC)	57
US Billboard Hot 100	48
US Mainstream Top 40 (Billboard)	44
US Hot Rock & Alternative Songs (Billboard)	8
Venezuela Rock (Record Report)	8

2025 year-end chart performance for "Lunch"
Chart (2025)	Position
US Hot Rock & Alternative Songs (Billboard)	93

== Certifications ==
Certifications for "Lunch"
Region	Certification	Certified units/sales
Australia (ARIA)	3× Platinum	210,000^{‡}
Austria (IFPI Austria)	Gold	15,000^{‡}
Belgium (BRMA)	Platinum	40,000^{‡}
Brazil (Pro-Música Brasil)	2× Diamond	320,000^{‡}
Canada (Music Canada)	3× Platinum	240,000^{‡}
Denmark (IFPI Danmark)	Gold	45,000^{‡}
France (SNEP)	Platinum	200,000^{‡}
Italy (FIMI)	Gold	50,000^{‡}
New Zealand (RMNZ)	2× Platinum	60,000^{‡}
Poland (ZPAV)	Platinum	50,000^{‡}
Portugal (AFP)	Platinum	10,000^{‡}
Spain (Promusicae)	Gold	30,000^{‡}
United Kingdom (BPI)	Platinum	600,000^{‡}
United States (RIAA)	Platinum	1,000,000^{‡}
Streaming
Central America (CFC)	Gold	3,500,000^{†}
Greece (IFPI Greece)	Platinum	2,000,000^{†}
^{‡} Sales+streaming figures based on certification alone.^{†} Streaming-only figures based on certification alone.

== Release history ==
Release dates and formats for "Lunch"
Region	Date	Format(s)	Label(s)	Ref.
Canada	May 17, 2024	Radio airplay	Interscope; Universal	
Italy	May 17, 2024	Radio airplay	Universal	
United States	May 17, 2024	Contemporary hit radio; hot adult contemporary radio; alternative radio	Darkroom; Interscope	
