= Billie Eilish =

American singer-songwriter (born 2001)

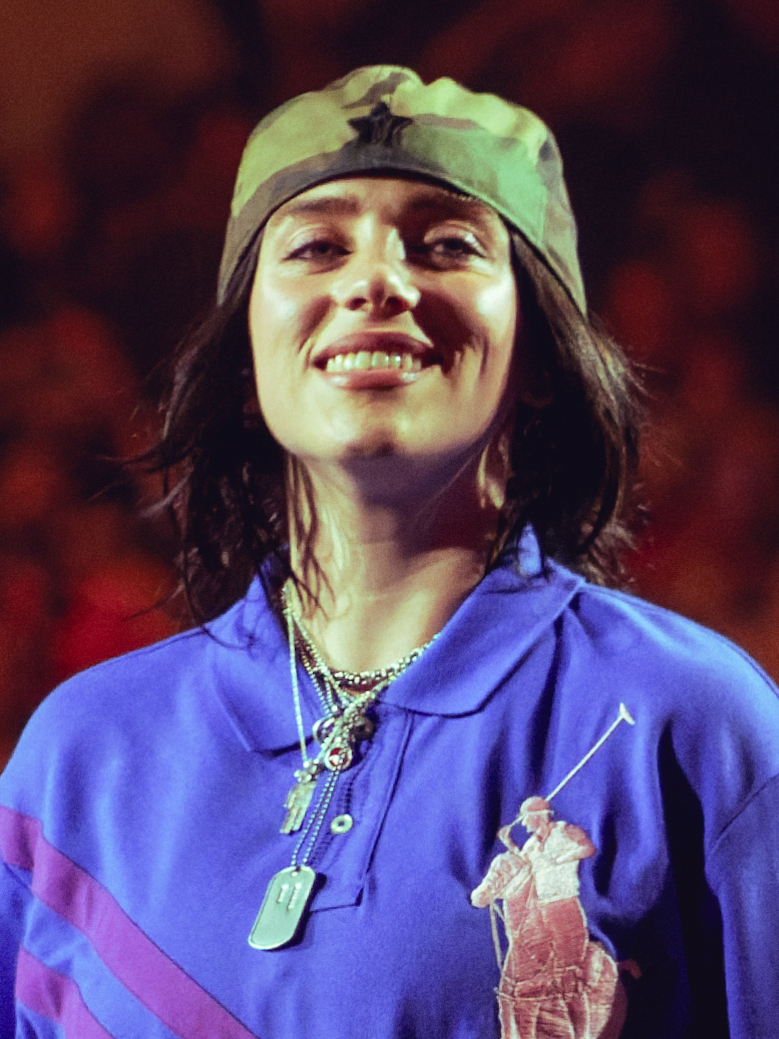
- Eilish in 2025
- Born: Billie Eilish Pirate Baird O'Connell; December 18, 2001 (age 24); Los Angeles, California, US
- Occupation: Singer-songwriter
- Years active: 2015–present
- Works: Discography; songs recorded; performances
- Mother: Maggie Baird
- Relatives: Finneas O'Connell (brother); Brian Baird (uncle)
- Awards: Full list
- Musical career
- Genres: Pop; electronica
- Instruments: Vocals; ukulele; guitar; piano
- Labels: Darkroom; Interscope
- Billie Eilish's voice On the concept behind "Bury a Friend"; Recorded April 2019
- Website: billieeilish.com

Billie Eilish Pirate Baird O'Connell (/ˈaɪlɪʃ/ EYE-lish; born December 18, 2001) is an American singer-songwriter. Known for her distinctive musical sound and vocal style, she is a prominent figure in 2020s pop culture. Eilish's production style frequently uses harmony lines and vocal layering, an extension of double tracking.

Eilish first gained public attention in 2015 with her debut single, "Ocean Eyes", which was written and produced by her brother, Finneas O'Connell. In 2017, she released her debut EP, Don't Smile at Me, which was commercially successful in various countries, including the United States, the United Kingdom, and Australia. Her first full-length album, When We All Fall Asleep, Where Do We Go? (2019), debuted atop the US Billboard 200 and UK Albums Chart and was one of the year's best-selling albums. Its single "Bad Guy" became the first by an artist born in the 21st century to top the US Billboard Hot 100 and be certified Diamond by the Recording Industry Association of America (RIAA).

Eilish's second studio album, Happier Than Ever (2021), became her second to debut atop the Billboard 200 and featured three US top-ten singles: "My Future", "Therefore I Am", and "Your Power". She won the Academy Award for Best Original Song twice for co-writing "No Time to Die" from the James Bond film No Time to Die (2021) and "What Was I Made For?" from the fantasy film Barbie (2023). Her critically acclaimed third studio album, Hit Me Hard and Soft (2024), featured the Billboard Global 200 number-one single "Birds of a Feather", which also became the most-streamed solo song by a female artist on Spotify.

Eilish's accolades include two Academy Awards, ten Grammy Awards, nine American Music Awards, twenty Guinness World Records, eight MTV Video Music Awards, four Brit Awards, and two Golden Globes. She is the second artist and only woman in Grammy history to win all four general field categories—Record of the Year, Album of the Year, Song of the Year, and Best New Artist—in a single ceremony, also becoming the youngest winner of both Album of the Year and Record of the Year. Eilish is also the first person born in the 21st century to win both a Grammy Award and an Academy Award, and the youngest two-time winner of the latter. She has a history of political activism, focusing on climate change awareness, women's reproductive rights, and gender equality.

== Early life ==
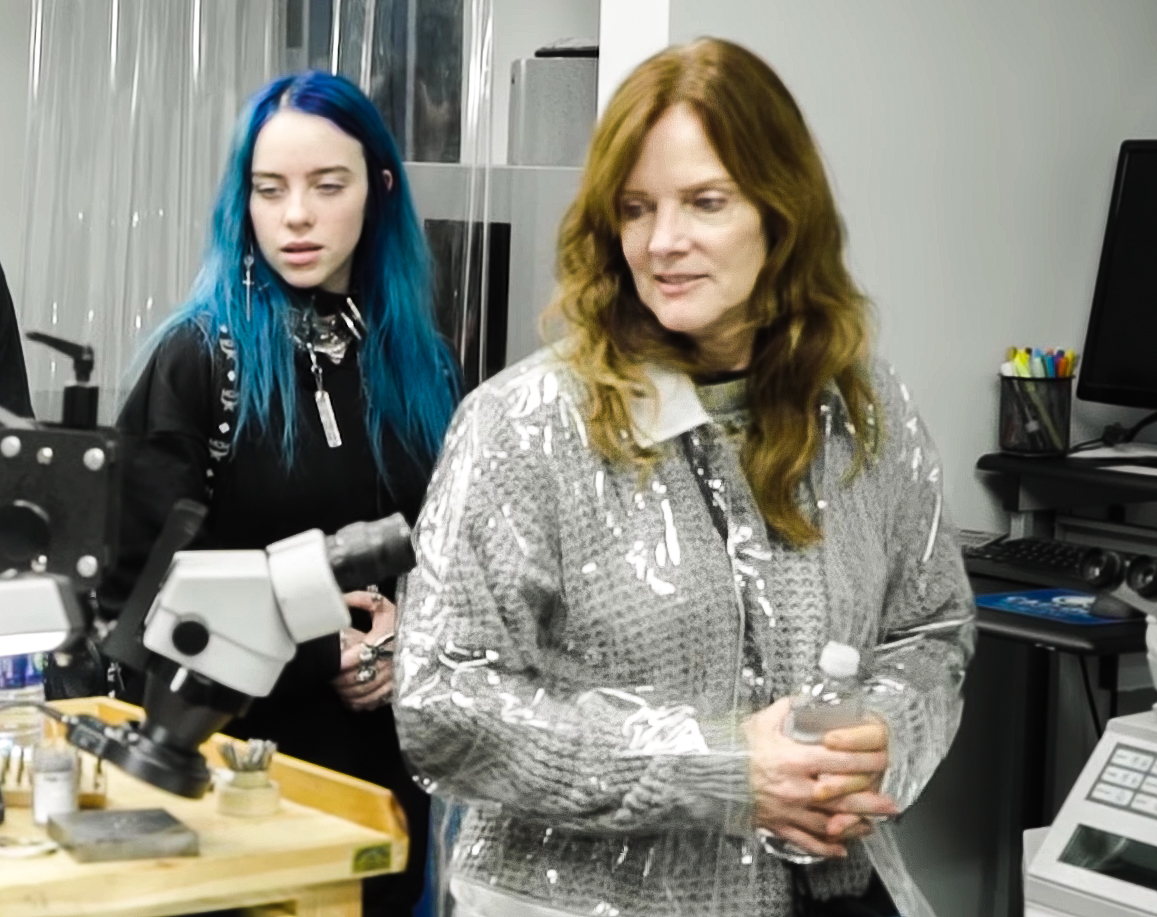
Eilish with her mother, Maggie Baird, in November 2018

Billie Eilish Pirate Baird O'Connell was born in Los Angeles, California, on December 18, 2001. She is the daughter of actress and teacher Maggie Baird and actor Patrick O'Connell, both of whom are also musicians and work on Eilish's tours. Eilish is of Irish and Scottish descent. Her middle name, Eilish, was chosen by her parents while watching a documentary about Irish conjoined twins Katie and Eilish Holton and was originally meant to be her first name, while Pirate was to have been her middle name. Her grandfather, William Baird, died during her mother's pregnancy, therefore her parents named her after him. Eilish "absolutely hated" her first name growing up, saying she would have preferred to have been named Violet or something feminine, though she now feels that "there's no other name in the universe that could be my name besides Billie". She grew up in Los Angeles's Highland Park neighborhood. Naturally blonde, Eilish has been dyeing her hair since age nine, starting with a Manic Panic shade of blue. She generally prefers it to be black, which feels most "like [her]".

Eilish and her older brother, Finneas, were homeschooled by Baird, a decision their parents made to spend time with them and give them the freedom to pursue their interests. Baird taught Eilish and Finneas the basics of songwriting. Eilish said her brother and mother inspired her to get into music. Their parents encouraged the siblings to express themselves and explore whatever they wanted, including art, dancing, and acting.

Eilish started playing the ukulele at age six. She performed at talent shows and joined the Los Angeles Children's Chorus at age eight. She wrote her first "real" song at age 11 for her mother's songwriting class. The song is about the zombie apocalypse, inspired by the television series The Walking Dead, from which she took script lines and episode titles. Eilish took some acting auditions, which she disliked, but she enjoyed recording background dialogue for crowd scenes and worked on the films Diary of a Wimpy Kid, Ramona and Beezus, and the X-Men series. Eilish also took dance classes until 2016, when a growth plate injury ended her dance career and she focused on recording music.

== Career ==
=== 2015–2017: Beginnings and early recognition ===
In 2015, 13-year-old Eilish began working on songs with her brother Finneas, who had been writing and producing for several years and had his own band. The first songs they recorded together were called "She's Broken" and "Fingers Crossed", the former written by Finneas and the latter by Eilish. "We recorded them and put them out on SoundCloud, just for fun", she recalled.

On November 18, 2015, Eilish released the song "Ocean Eyes". The track was written, mixed, and produced by Finneas, who had originally created it for his band the Slightlys before deciding it would be a better fit for Eilish's vocals. He gave it to Eilish when Fred Diaz, her dance teacher at the Revolution Dance Center, asked them to write a song for choreography. The siblings uploaded the song to SoundCloud, where Diaz could access and download it. The song received several hundred thousand listens in two weeks, and Finneas's manager, Danny Rukasin, reached out to him to discuss Eilish's potential. Rukasin felt she could achieve significant success with Finneas's help.

In January 2016, Finneas and his manager arranged a deal in which Apple Music signed Eilish to A&R company Platoon, specializing in packaging emerging artists before they get a major-label contract. Eilish then hired a publicist, who connected her to the luxury fashion brand Chanel, and a stylist, both of whom helped shape her image. On March 24, 2016, a music video for "Ocean Eyes" directed by Megan Thompson premiered on Eilish's official YouTube channel. "Ocean Eyes" and Eilish received praise and promotion from various media outlets and marketers, including radio stations and music supervisors such as Beats 1, KCRW, BBC Radio 1, Zane Lowe, Jason Kramer, Annie Mac, and Chris Douridas. On June 23, 2016, Eilish and Finneas released "Six Feet Under" on SoundCloud as her second single. A homemade music video for the song was released on June 30, 2016. It was directed by Eilish and edited by her mother, Maggie Baird.

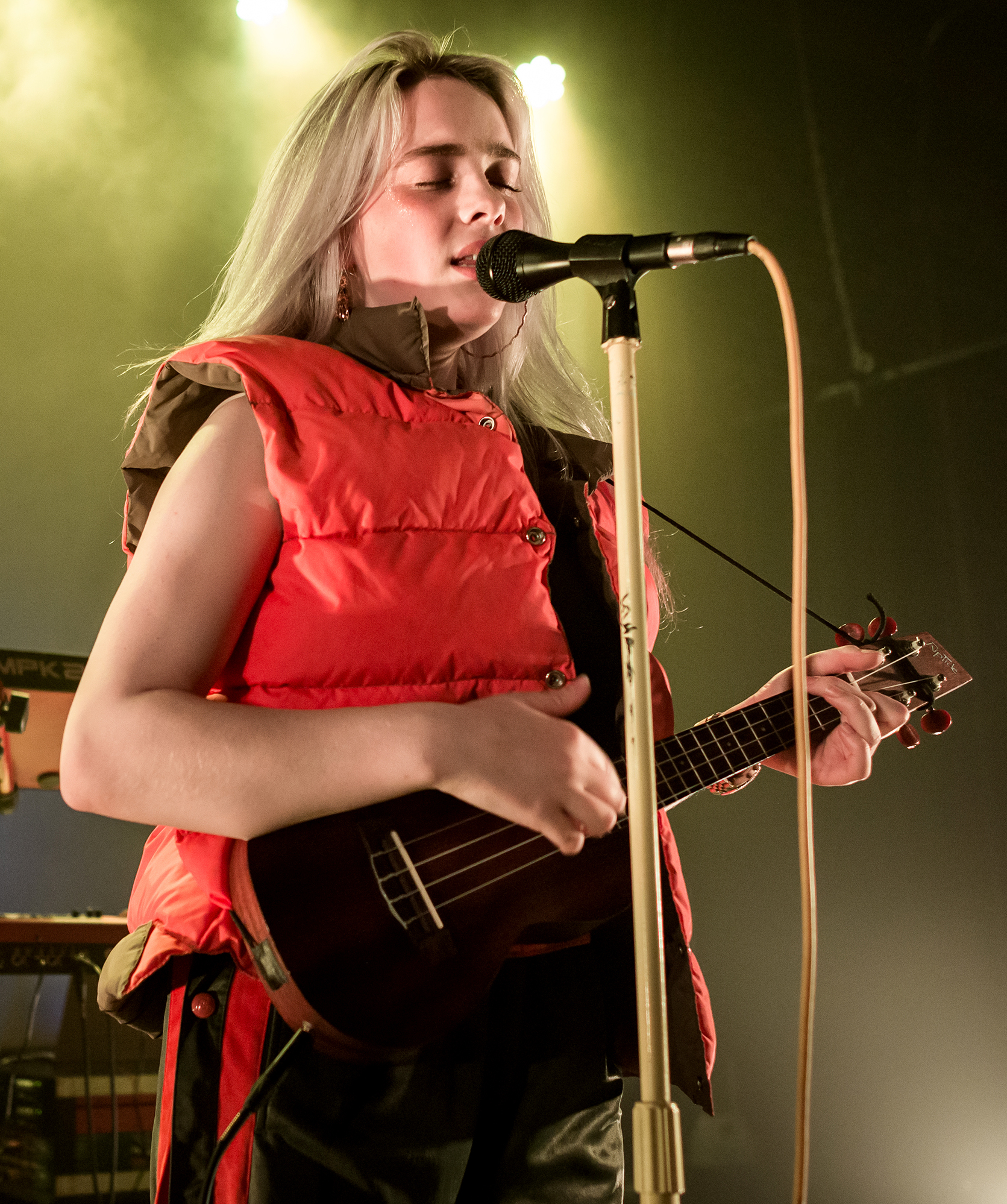
Eilish performing in August 2017

In August 2016, Justin Lubliner, who had noticed Eilish's talent in 2015 when he first heard "Ocean Eyes", signed her to Darkroom and Interscope Records. He developed her rollout as an artist, taking inspiration from the model of hip hop artists such as Travis Scott and Chance the Rapper, not relying on one big single and focusing on creating a "persona and distinct aesthetic". Darkroom and Interscope Records re-released "Six Feet Under" and "Ocean Eyes" as singles for digital download and streaming on November 17 and 18, 2016, respectively. On November 22, 2016, a dance performance music video for "Ocean Eyes" was uploaded to Eilish's YouTube channel.

On January 14, 2017, Eilish released an EP with four remixes by Astronomyy, Blackbear, Goldhouse, and Cautious Clay for "Ocean Eyes", and another EP for "Six Feet Under" featuring remixes by Blu J, Gazzo, Jerry Folk, and Aire Atlantica. After the success of the "Ocean Eyes" remixes, Eilish released "Bellyache" on February 24, 2017. A video for the song was released on March 22, 2017, directed by Miles and AJ. Eilish released "Bored" on March 30, 2017, as part of the soundtrack to the Netflix series 13 Reasons Why. A video for "Bored" was released on June 26, 2017. In March of the same year, Apple Music showcased Eilish at the South by Southwest music festival. On June 30, 2017, Eilish released "Watch". Eilish released another single, "Copycat", on July 14, 2017, and announced the release of her debut EP, Don't Smile at Me. Eilish later released "Idontwannabeyouanymore" and "My Boy". On August 11, 2017, Eilish released Don't Smile at Me. The EP was a sleeper hit, reaching number 14 on the US Billboard 200. Eilish embarked on the Don't Smile at Me Tour throughout October 2017 in support of her EP. Eilish released "Bitches Broken Hearts" through SoundCloud on November 10, 2017.

Eilish's team worked with Spotify, which promoted her on its most popular playlist, "Today's Top Hits". The Baffler described Eilish's sound as fitting into the "streambait" genre consisting of largely "mid-tempo, melancholy pop" influenced by Lana Del Rey, whose "singing style", "bleakness", and "hip-hop influenced production" shaped the aesthetic. Eilish's commercial success expanded with her Spotify promotion. In September 2017, Apple Music named Eilish their Up Next artist, which followed with a short documentary, a live session EP, and an interview with Zane Lowe on Apple Music's radio station Beats 1. That month, the live EP, Up Next Session: Billie Eilish, was released. On December 15, 2017, Eilish released her collaboration with American rapper Vince Staples, "&Burn", a remix of her single "Watch". It was included on the expanded edition of Don't Smile at Me.

=== 2018–2020: When We All Fall Asleep, Where Do We Go? ===
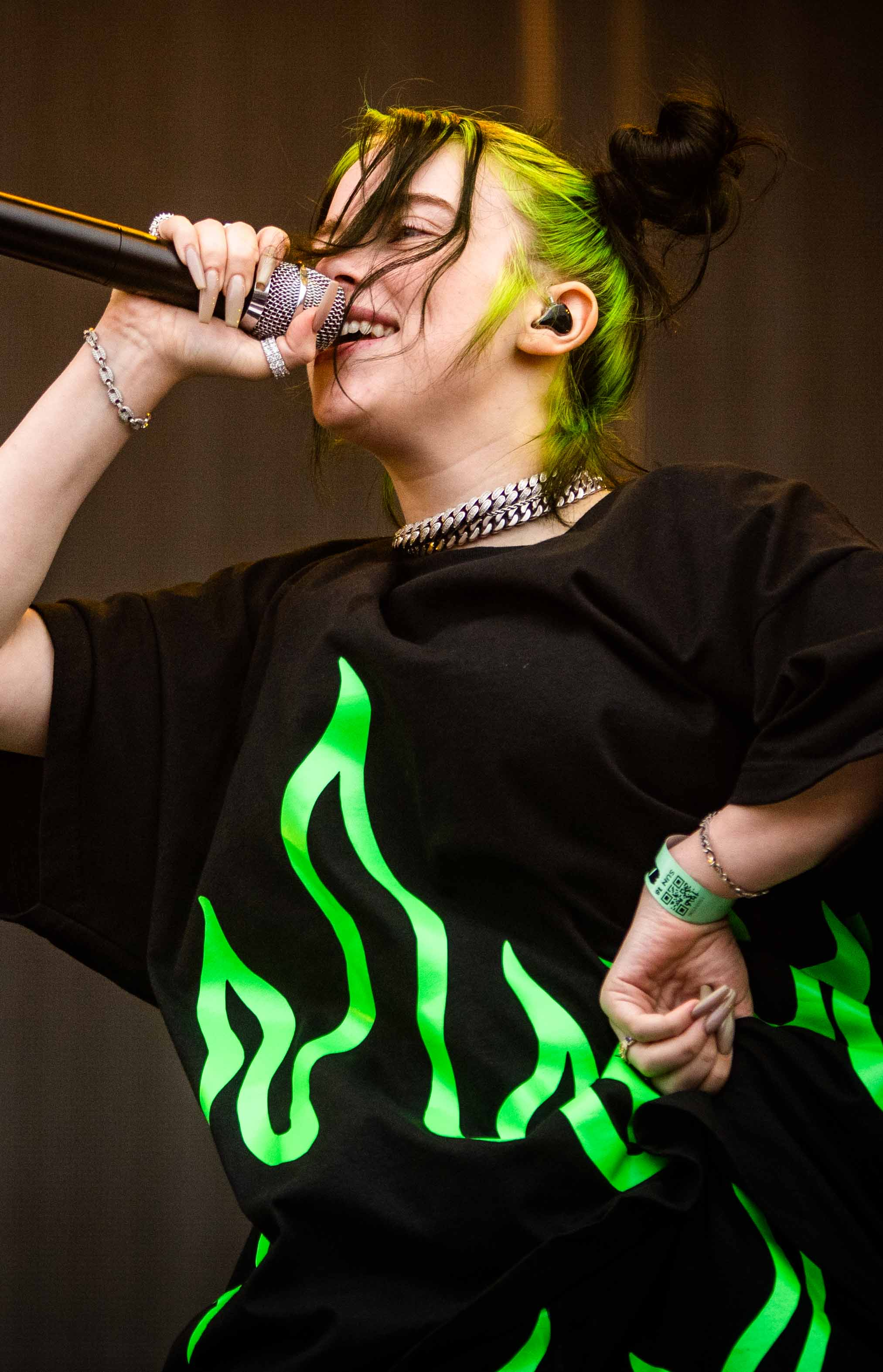
Eilish at Pukkelpop Festival in 2019

In February 2018, Eilish embarked on her second headlining concert tour, the Where's My Mind Tour, which concluded in April 2018. "Bitches Broken Hearts" was re-released worldwide on March 30, 2018. For Record Store Day 2018, Eilish released "Party Favor" on a pink 7-inch vinyl, along with a cover of "Hotline Bling", by Drake, as the B-side. Eilish collaborated with American singer Khalid on the single "Lovely", which was released on April 19, 2018, and added to the soundtrack for the second season of 13 Reasons Why. She released "You Should See Me in a Crown" in July 2018. The same month, Eilish performed at the Mo Pop Festival.

On the day of release for her single "When the Party's Over", Eilish was featured in Vanity Fair's "73 Questions" rapid-fire questionnaire video series by Joe Sabia, who revisited an interview from October 2017. The resulting video was a side-by-side time capsule of both interviews showing her growth in popularity over one year. Eilish embarked on the 1 by 1 Tour in October 2018 to further support Don't Smile at Me; it concluded in March 2019. She signed a talent contract with Next Management for fashion and beauty endorsements in October 2018. She was placed on the 2018 Forbes 30 Under 30 list in November and released the single "Come Out and Play" in November 2018, which was written for a holiday-themed Apple Inc. commercial. In early January 2019, Don't Smile at Me reached one billion streams on Spotify, making her the youngest artist to top one billion streams on a project. That month, Eilish released "Bury a Friend" as the third single from her debut studio album, When We All Fall Asleep, Where Do We Go?, along with "When I Was Older", a single inspired by the 2018 film Roma, which appeared on the compilation album Music Inspired by the Film Roma. In February, Eilish partnered with YouTube on a documentary miniseries, "A Snippet Into Billie's Mind". "Wish You Were Gay", her fourth single from the album, was released on March 4, 2019.

When We All Fall Asleep, Where Do We Go? was released on March 29, 2019. Spotify launched a "multi-level campaign behind the album", creating a multimedia playlist and "new product features" that Spotify said "allow for vertical video content, custom assets, and editorial storylines, all with the goal of creating more meaningful and engaging context for [Eilish's] fans". In Los Angeles, Spotify set up a "pop-up enhanced album experience", which included different artwork and a "multi-sensory" experience of each track for fans. The album debuted atop the Billboard 200 and the UK Albums Chart, making Eilish the first artist born in the 2000s to have a number-one album in the US and the youngest woman to have a number-one album in the United Kingdom. Upon the album's debut, Eilish broke the record for the most simultaneously charting songs on the US Billboard Hot 100 by a female artist, with 14, after every song from the album, excluding "Goodbye", charted on the Hot 100. The fifth single, "Bad Guy", was released in conjunction with the album. A remix of the song featuring Justin Bieber was released in July 2019. In August, "Bad Guy" peaked at number one in the US, ending Lil Nas X's record-breaking 19 weeks at number one with "Old Town Road". She is the first artist born in the 2000s and the youngest artist since Lorde (with "Royals") to have a number-one single.

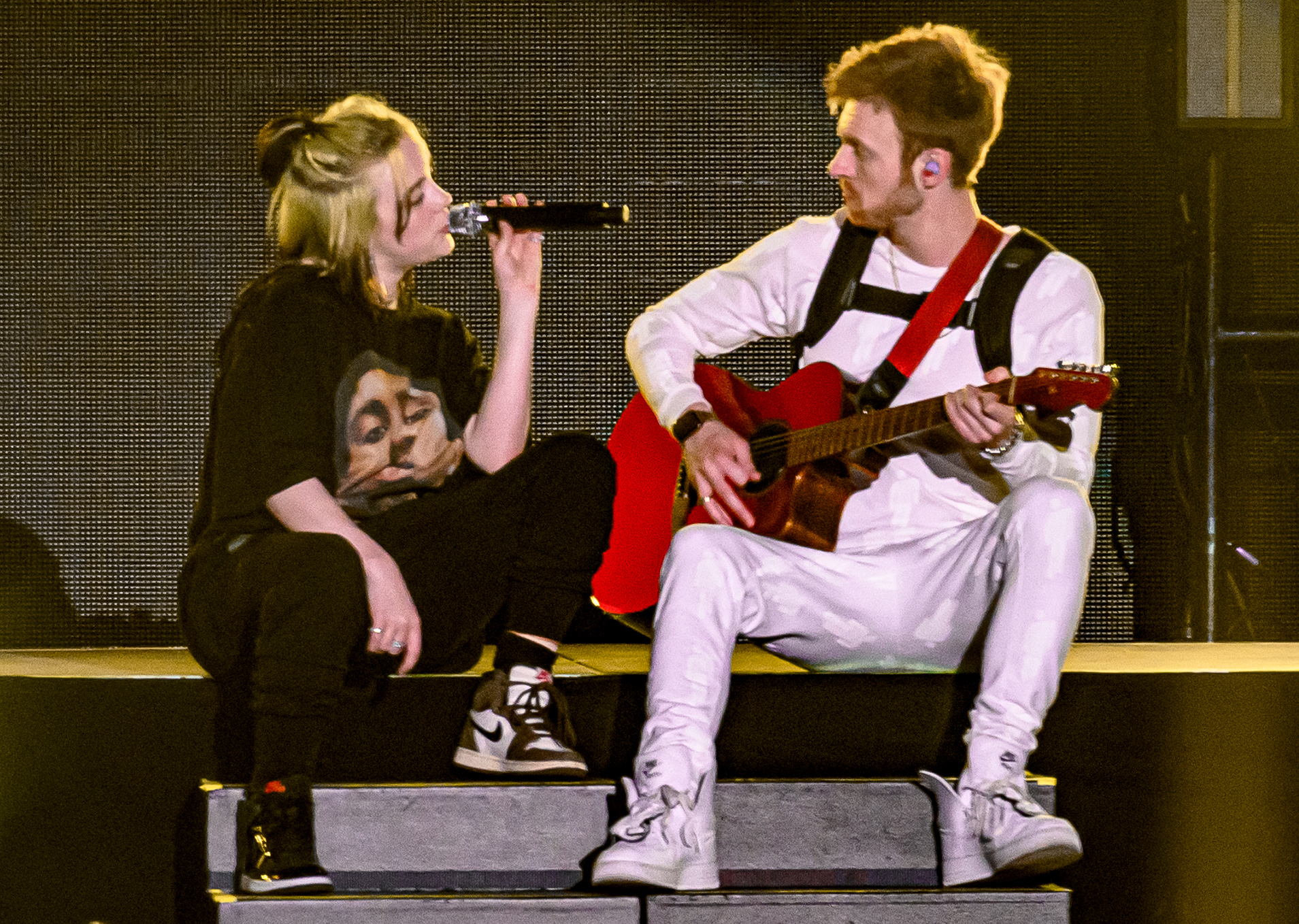
Eilish in 2020 with her brother and collaborator Finneas O'Connell

Eilish began her When We All Fall Asleep Tour at Coachella Festival in April 2019, with the tour concluding on November 17, 2019, in Mexico City. In August 2019, she partnered with Apple Music for Music Lab: Remix Billie Eilish, part of the Apple Store's Music Lab sessions during which fans deconstruct her song "You Should See Me In A Crown" and learn how to create their own remix on Apple devices and GarageBand. On September 27, 2019, Eilish announced her Where Do We Go? World Tour. The tour began in Miami on March 9, 2020, and ran for two more shows on March 10 in Orlando and March 12 in Raleigh before Eilish ended the tour prematurely due to the COVID-19 pandemic. The tour was set to conclude in Jakarta on September 7.

On November 7, 2019, Jack White's Third Man Records announced that the label would release an acoustic live album of Eilish's performance from the record label's Blue Room, exclusively sold on vinyl at Third Man retail locations in Nashville and Detroit. On November 13, 2019, she released her next single, "Everything I Wanted". On November 20, 2019, Eilish was nominated for six Grammy Awards, including Record of the Year and Song of the Year for "Bad Guy" as well as Album of the Year and Best New Artist. At age 17, she became the youngest artist to be nominated in all four General Field categories. In the same month, Eilish was crowned 2019's Billboard Woman of the Year.

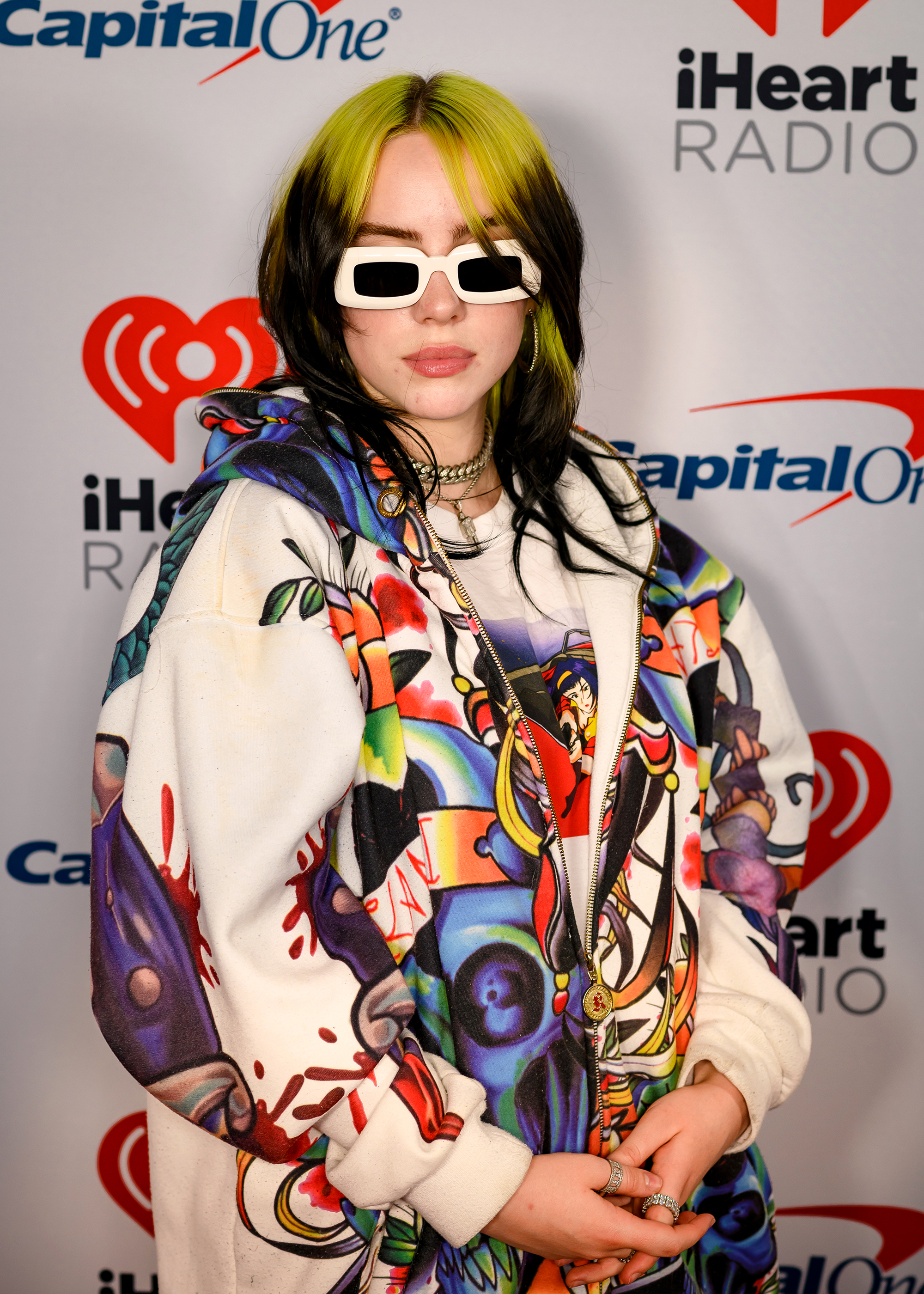
Eilish at the ALTer EGO concert in January 2020

On January 14, 2020, Eilish was announced as the performer of the title track for No Time to Die, the 25th installment in the James Bond film franchise, written and produced with her brother. With this announcement, Eilish became the youngest artist to write and perform a James Bond theme song. It became the second Bond theme song to top the British official charts and the first Bond theme performed by a female artist to do so. It was also Eilish's first number-one single in the UK. At the 62nd Annual Grammy Awards, she became the youngest person to win the four main Grammy categories – Best New Artist, Record of the Year, Song of the Year, and Album of the Year – in the same year. During the COVID-19 pandemic, Eilish and her brother performed for both iHeart Media's Living Room Concert for America and Global Citizen's Together at Home concert series, singing a cover of Bobby Hebb's "Sunny" for the latter. Both virtual concerts were an effort to raise awareness and funds towards fighting the disease. On April 10, 2020, "Ilomilo" was sent to Italian contemporary hit radio stations by Universal Music Group, as When We All Fall Asleep, Where Do We Go?'s seventh and final single. On July 30, 2020, Eilish released "My Future", her first original release since "No Time to Die", along with an animated video. In 2020, she became the youngest person to feature on the Forbes Celebrity 100 list, with earnings of $53 million. In September 2020, Eilish released a collection of branded ukuleles with guitar manufacturer Fender.

On October 7, 2020, Eilish announced a virtual concert titled Where Do We Go? The Livestream. Staged in Los Angeles on October 24, the performance utilised extended reality (XR) technology and featured drummer Andrew Marshall and Eilish's brother, Finneas. Ticket proceeds were used to support touring crew members affected by COVID-19 cancellations via Crew Nation. In a Vanity Fair interview, Eilish said she was working on "sixteen new songs and lov[ing] them all", revealing an upcoming musical project. Eilish won three Billboard Music Awards on October 24—Top Female Artist, Top Billboard 200 Album (When We All Fall Asleep, Where Do We Go?), and Top New Artist—out of the 12 that she was nominated for. Also that month, she announced a new single, "Therefore I Am", which was released along with its video on November 12, 2020. Eilish performed "Therefore I Am" and "My Future" at the Jingle Ball in December 2020.

=== 2021–2022: Happier Than Ever ===
"Lo Vas a Olvidar", a single featuring Rosalía as part of HBO's Euphoria soundtrack, was released in January 2021, for the special "Fuck Anyone Who's Not a Sea Blob". On February 26, 2021, the R. J. Cutler-directed documentary film Billie Eilish: The World's a Little Blurry was released on Apple TV+ and in select movie theaters. The film was praised by critics and fans for its in-depth look at Eilish's personal life during her ascent to fame. At the 63rd Annual Grammy Awards, Eilish took home two awards: Best Song Written for Visual Media for her Bond theme and Record of the Year for "Everything I Wanted". In her acceptance speech for Record of the Year, Eilish said that Megan Thee Stallion "deserved to win", but still thanked her fans and her brother for her award. In 2021, she published her personally selected comprehensive book of photographs that shared "an intimate window into her life" on and off stage, By – Billie Eilish.

On April 27, 2021, Eilish announced on her Instagram account that her second album, Happier Than Ever, would be released on July 30, and the tracklist was made available on Apple Music. The album was released in various formats, including collectible vinyl and cassette colors. The album's release was preceded by five singles: "My Future", "Therefore I Am", "Your Power", "Lost Cause", and "NDA", and was accompanied by the title track. On December 2, 2021, Eilish announced an eco-friendly limited-edition vinyl version of Happier Than Ever made from recycled vinyl scraps. The collector's item was available only at a number of Gucci stores around the world and included Gucci-branded nail stickers designed by the brand's creative director, Alessandro Michele. To further promote the album, Eilish worked with Disney+ on the concert film Happier Than Ever: A Love Letter to Los Angeles, released in September 2021, and embarked on Happier Than Ever, The World Tour in February 2022, concluding it in April 2023.

In June 2021, Eilish was criticized online for videos in which she mouthed the anti-Asian slur "chink" while lip-syncing the song "Fish" by Tyler, the Creator, while Matthew Tyler Vorce, her reported boyfriend at the time, received criticism for alleged social media posts in which he used offensive language and slurs against gay and Black people. Eilish was also accused of queerbaiting after using the caption "I love girls" to promote the music video for "Lost Cause". On June 22, she posted an apology to Instagram stories for her usage of "chink", saying that she was "appalled and embarrassed" by the video and that she was "13 or 14" at the time and did not know the slur was a derogatory term. She also addressed a separate video of what was viewed as her mocking an Asian accent, writing that she was actually "speaking in a silly gibberish made up voice". Reflecting on the events in a July 2021 interview, Eilish said: "I said so many things then that I totally don't agree with now, or think the opposite thing. The weirdest thing is how nothing ever goes away once it's on the internet ... When you're a fucking teenager, you don't really know yourself ... I didn't actually know how I really felt. So I just came up with this facade that I stuck to."

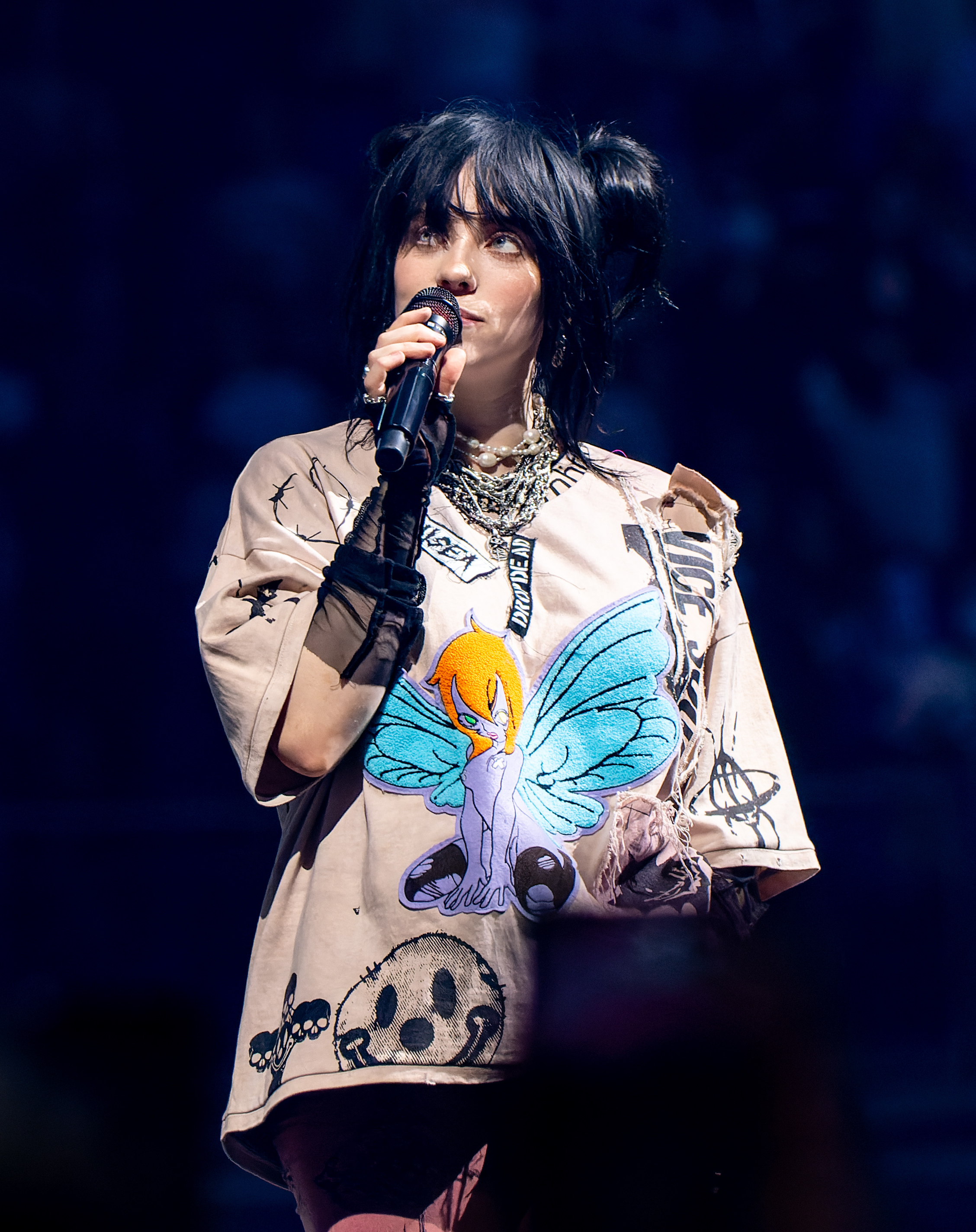
Eilish during Happier Than Ever, The World Tour (2022)

Eilish started formulating ideas for her third studio album's songs with Finneas in December 2021. In a July 2022 interview with Zane Lowe for Apple Music, she said she hoped to start writing the album in 2023. In 2022, Eilish won the Academy Award for Best Original Song for "No Time to Die", becoming the first person born in the 21st century to win an Academy Award. That same year, she became the youngest headliner of the Glastonbury and Coachella festivals. The Pixar film Turning Red was released that year, for which she and Finneas wrote three songs, "Nobody Like U", "U Know What's Up", and "1 True Love", performed by Turning Red's fictional boy band 4*Town.

In June 2022, during her world tour's Manchester show, Eilish debuted the then-unreleased ballad "TV". The song references the overturning of Roe v. Wade, a case that made abortion a constitutional right in the US. The next month, on July 21, she surprise-released the two-track EP Guitar Songs, which includes "TV" alongside "The 30th". Eilish explained her decision to surprise-release the EP during the interview with Lowe. She told him that while work on her third studio album was coming soon, she refused to wait until that time to put "TV" and "The 30th" on a track list. She wanted to spread their messages to her fans as soon as possible, noting the immediacy of its lyrics: "These songs are really current for me, and they're songs that I want to have said right now." Another reason was Eilish had grown tired of doing heavy, traditional promotion for upcoming music. She wanted to release songs like she had early in her career, previewing them for fans in live concerts before releasing them without much marketing.

Eilish worked with Apple Music to exclusively host a film of one of the Happier Than Ever tour concerts, specifically one of her shows at the O2 Arena in London. She billed the film as a way for fans who missed out on tickets to experience the tour, wanting more people to recognize her showmanship live. Three concerts, titled Happier Than Ever, The Hometown Encore, were held at the Kia Forum in Inglewood, California, from December 13 to 16, 2022, as part of the tour.

=== 2023–present: Hit Me Hard and Soft and acting debut ===
In 2023, Eilish made her acting debut in the Amazon Prime Video satirical thriller series Swarm. She starred as Eva, the leader of a cult inspired by NXIVM, and received positive reviews for her performance. Eilish wrote the song "What Was I Made For?" for the soundtrack of the 2023 film Barbie. According to statements posted on her social media, she was inspired to write the song after seeing unfinished scenes of the movie during its production. In 2024, the song won the Academy Award for Best Original Song and two Grammy Awards for Song of the Year and Best Song Written for Visual Media. It became the tenth song in history to win both an Academy Award for Best Original Song and a Grammy Award for Song of the Year, and Eilish became the youngest person ever to win two Academy Awards in any category.

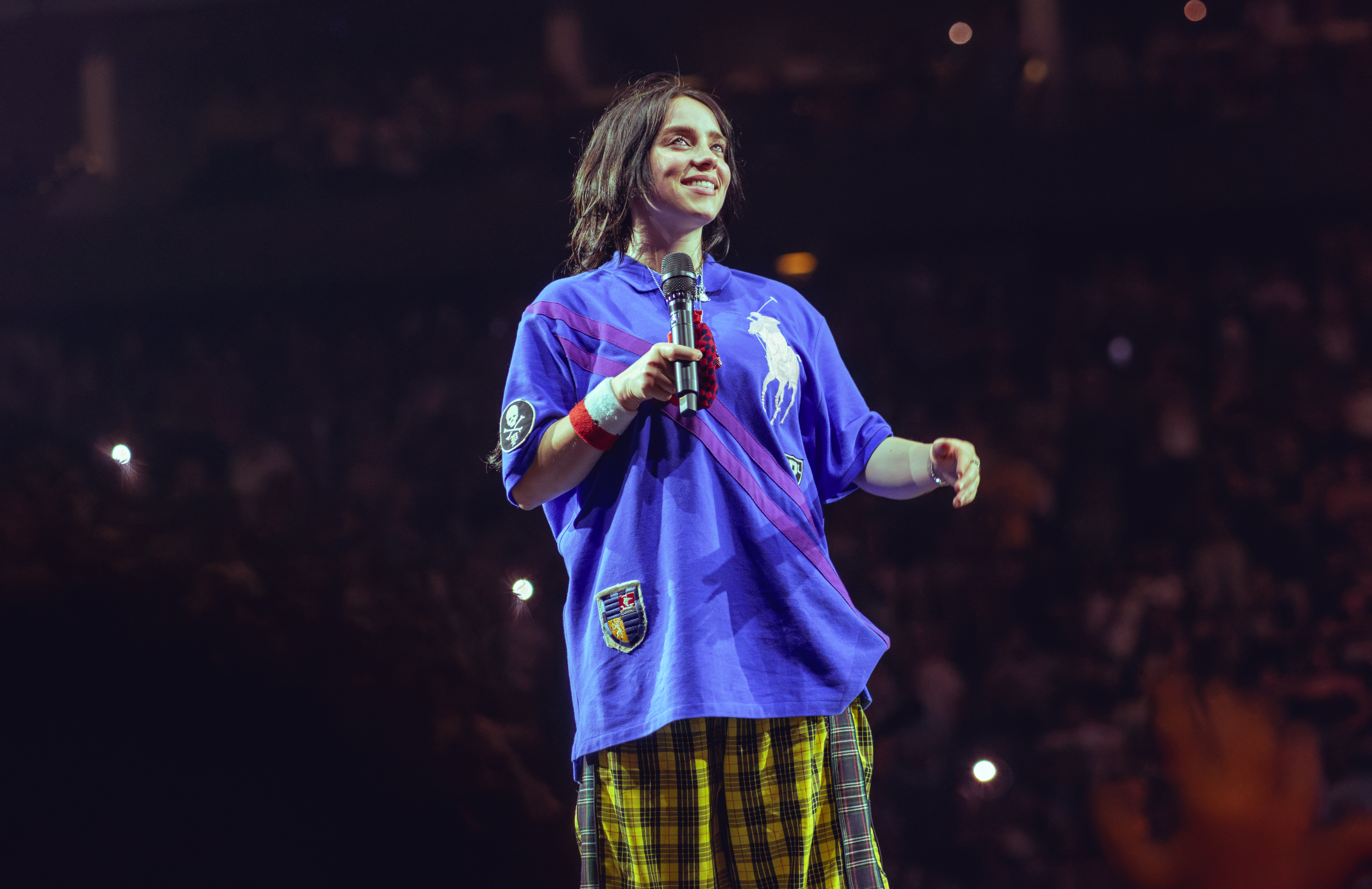
Eilish during Hit Me Hard and Soft: The Tour (2025)

On April 8, 2024, Eilish announced her third studio album, Hit Me Hard and Soft, which was released on May 17. Also in April, she was announced to be the next "featured artist" inside the Fortnite spin-off game Fortnite Festival, along with an unlockable outfit in the game. While on a visit to London due to her album's success in the UK, Eilish appeared alongside London-based content creator Amelia Dimoldenberg on her web series Chicken Shop Date, which was dubbed as the "flirtiest episode yet", and also appeared as a guest host for children's channel CBeebies' bedtime story. In August, Eilish featured on a remix of Charli XCX's "Guess", a song from the deluxe version of the latter's album Brat, accompanied by a video containing scenes of Eilish in a bulldozer and the pair surrounded by piles of women's underwear, which were donated to the charity I Support the Girls. On August 11, Eilish performed "Birds of a Feather" on Belmont Shore, Long Beach, during the 2024 Summer Olympics closing ceremony as part of the handover to Los Angeles, which would host the Games in 2028. She embarked on Hit Me Hard and Soft: The Tour to support Hit Me Hard and Soft, with 106 concerts in North America, Oceania, Europe, and Asia between September 2024 and November 2025.

In March 2026, it was reported that Eilish was in "advanced talks" to make her film acting debut as lead character Esther Greenwood in a Sarah Polley-directed adaptation of Sylvia Plath's The Bell Jar. Eilish's Hit Me Hard and Soft: The Tour (Live in 3D) concert film, which she co-directed and produced with James Cameron, was theatrically released on May 8, 2026. In November, it was announced that Eilish would headline the Glastonbury Festival 2027 for the second time.

== Artistry ==
=== Influences ===
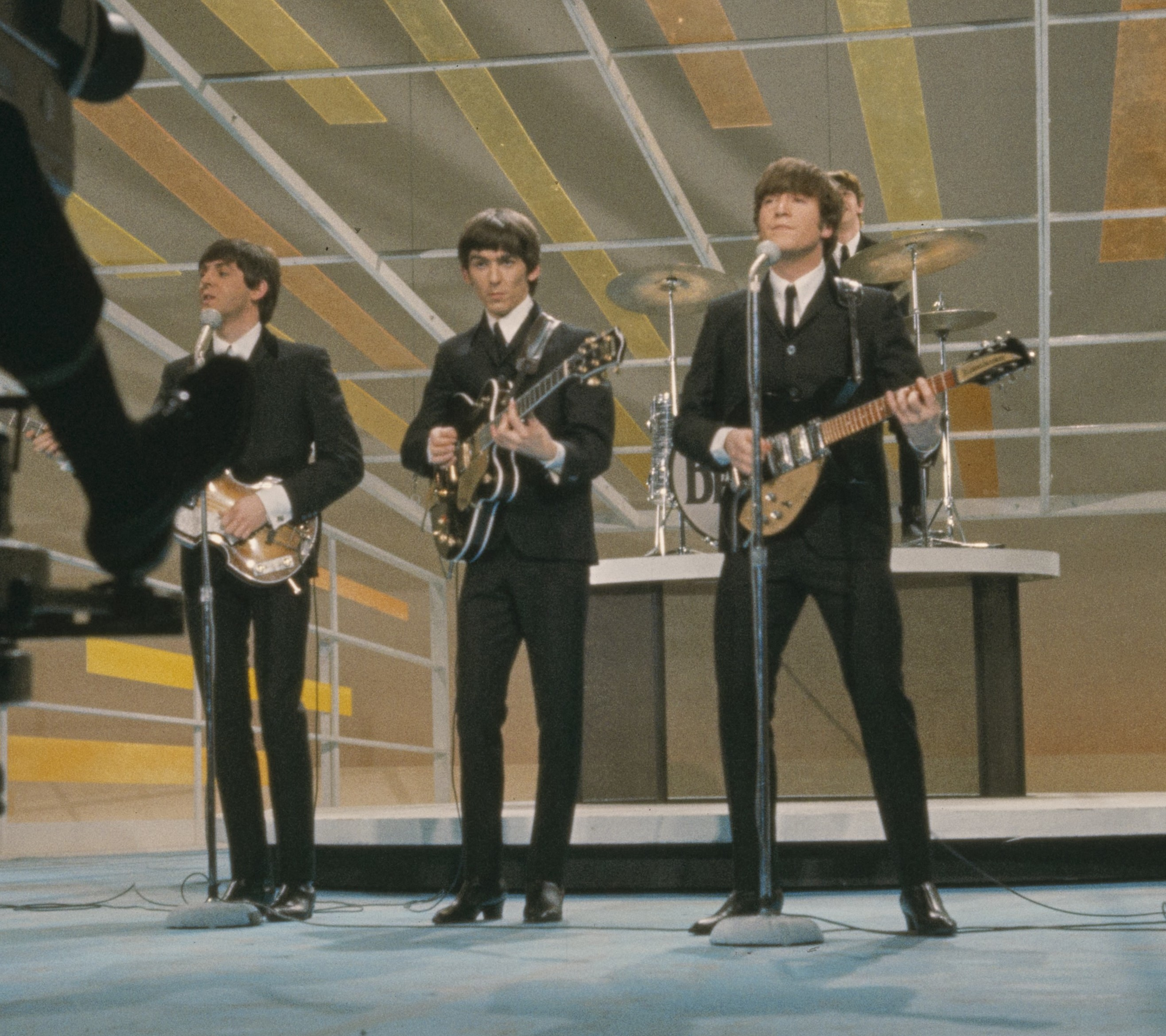
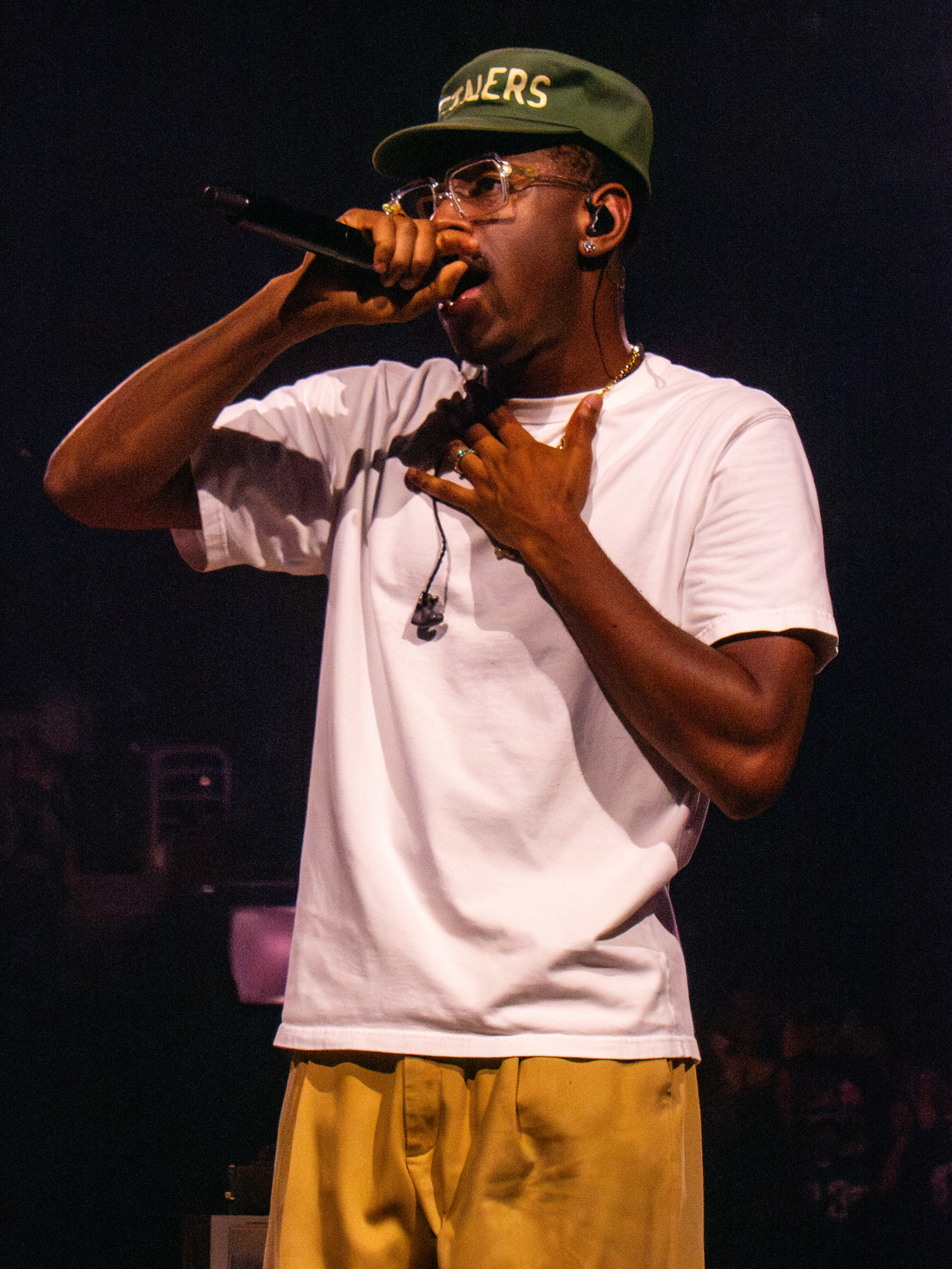
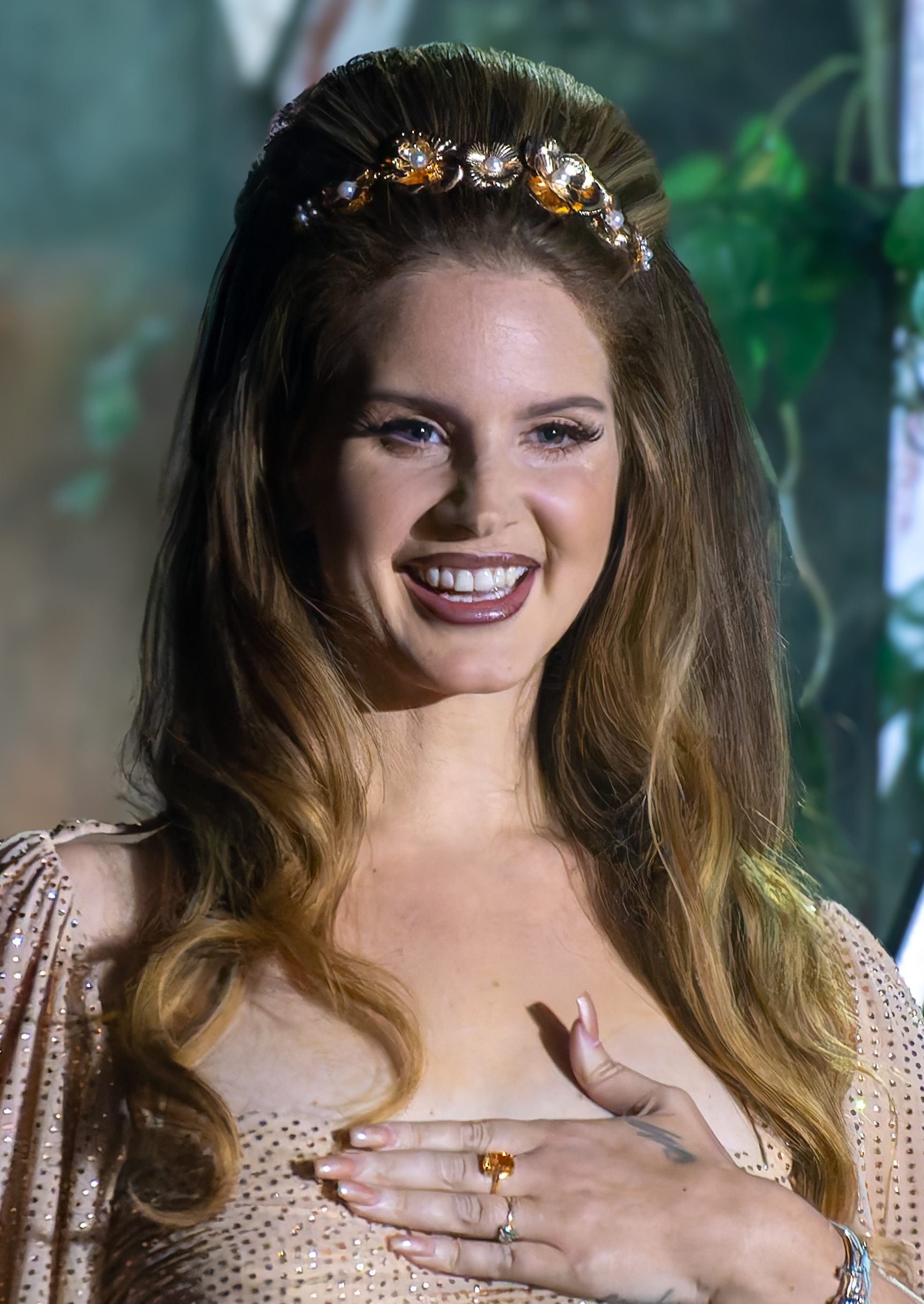
Musicians such as (left to right) the Beatles, Tyler, the Creator, and Lana Del Rey have influenced Eilish and her music.

Eilish grew up listening to the Beatles, Justin Bieber, Green Day, the 1975, Arctic Monkeys, Nine Inch Nails, Linkin Park, and Lana Del Rey. She has named the Beatles as her greatest musical inspiration, crediting the band for inspiring "95% of [her] love for music". She has said that stumbling upon Aurora's "Runaway" on YouTube inspired her to pursue a career in music. Hip-hop is her favorite genre of music.

She has recounted that Matty Healy was an early inspiration for her: "His show is the second show I ever went to in my life. He changed so much about who I am, how I write music." She has also cited Tyler, the Creator, Childish Gambino, and Avril Lavigne as major musical and style influences. Other influences include Adele, Earl Sweatshirt, James Blake, Amy Winehouse, the Spice Girls, Lorde, Marina, Britney Spears, Nicki Minaj, XXXTentacion, and Twenty One Pilots. She has also shown appreciation for Paramore after inviting Hayley Williams to join her set during Williams's first Coachella to perform an acoustic version of "Misery Business" and sing "Happier Than Ever". Eilish also named Rihanna as an inspiration for her style choices after she called fashion her "defense mechanism" during an acceptance speech. She has also credited Damon Albarn for changing the way she views art and music creation.

Eilish has been compared in the media to Lavigne, Lorde and Del Rey, the last of whom she says she does not want to be compared to, saying, "That woman has made her brand so perfect for her whole career and she shouldn't have to hear that." Eilish said that Ariana Grande's 2019 album Thank U, Next inspired her to continue making music.

=== Style ===
"Ocean Eyes" (2015)
"Ocean Eyes" is an electronic and indie-pop ballad that features minimalist beats and Eilish's soprano vocals.

Eilish has a soprano vocal range. Avery Stone of Vice called her vocals "ethereal", and Maura Johnston of Rolling Stone characterized them as "whispery". Doreen St. Félix of The New Yorker wrote that she has a "husky, slurring voice that she can thin out to reedy". Music critic Robert Christgau wrote that while Eilish is musically and commercially pop, her brand also "reminds us how amorphous [pop] has become", calling her soprano "too diminutive for vocal calisthenics" and adding that her "playful version of teen-goth angst" and "electro-saturated debut album" captivate a diverse audience. Her music is generally described as pop or electronica, although she also incorporates elements of electronic, alternative, dance, hip-hop, and rock. Her musical style has primarily been categorized as alternative pop, electropop, and indie pop, while also falling under bedroom pop, emo pop, experimental pop, pop rock, and teen pop labels, with dark pop and indie electronic inflections. She has delved into downtempo and jazz pop styles on her second album, Happier Than Ever. Musicologist Jessica Holmes argued that much of Eilish's music concerns her depression.

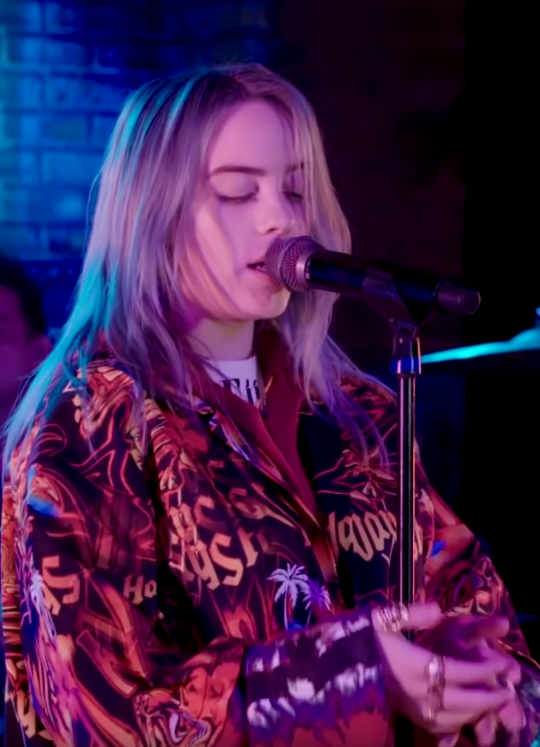
Eilish performing for MTV in 2019

Eilish and her brother, Finneas, collaborate on songwriting. Finneas writes for Eilish's albums, produces her music, and also performs in live shows. Eilish and Finneas "like to completely make up things and become characters" and "have songs that are really fictional". Eilish said a number of the songs also derive from her and Finneas' experiences. They try to write "really interesting and conversational" lyrics: "We try to say stuff that doesn't have to be that deep ... but you say something way deeper in a certain way that makes sense, but you haven't really thought about." Finneas has said that when he writes for his sister, he aims to "write [songs] that I think she'll relate to and enjoy singing and empathise with the lyrics and make her own". When he writes with Eilish, he tries "to help her tell whatever story she's trying to tell, bounce ideas off of her, listen to her ideas", and use a language that fits her voice telling the story.

In the multitrack recording process, Eilish and Finneas are known for their frequent use of complex vocal layering in which the vocals are recorded many times and played back in a "vocal stack". Building a song in this manner may take many recording sessions. Eilish listens to her previous vocal recordings on headphones while overdubbing a new track, singing an additional version to add to the others. Often singing in a breathy, intimate style, she adds double tracking unison lines as well as multiple harmony parts; her brother says "she is such an incredible harmonizer." Eilish's voice is typically recorded "dry" (without reverb) and her mouth is positioned very close to the microphone to enhance the proximity effect for the desired sense of intimacy. Sound engineer Rob Kinelski, who has mixed many of Eilish's songs, says that the brother–sister duo directs him to do very little to the vocal layering that they bring to him—it is largely complete prior to mixing the song. MusicRadar wrote, "Wanna sound like Billie? Lots of layers, lots of harmonies. Oh and be a great singer."

In later interviews, Eilish described becoming more emotionally "honest" and pushing herself out of her comfort zone during the songwriting process. While discussing Hit Me Hard and Soft with Zane Lowe for Apple Music, she said that early sessions for the album involved unfinished song fragments that were later revisited and developed into completed songs, which was a new approach for their musical process. Eilish said she came to enjoy songwriting more during the album's creation, and also described the record as pushing herself vocally more than any of her previous albums.

Eilish had wanted to direct her own music videos since age 14 but was initially not given the opportunity due to lack of experience. In 2019, she made her directorial debut with the video for her song "Xanny". She has since directed nearly all of her music videos, including "Happier Than Ever", "What Was I Made For?", and "Chihiro".

== Public image ==
=== Fashion style ===
Much of the media attention surrounding Eilish has revolved around her fashion style, which consists primarily of baggy, oversized clothing. In 2017, she said she likes dressing out of her comfort zone to feel like she grabs the attention of everyone around her. She tries to be "really different from a lot of people" and dresses opposite to what others wear. Aiming to "look memorable", Eilish said that she "proved to people that [she's] more important than they think" and likes being "kind of intimidating, so people will listen up". In 2019, she said: "Over time it's kind of become a thing, 'Billie Eilish, the creepy, weird, scary girl.' And I don't like that. It's lame. I just don't want to stay one thing."

In May 2019, Eilish appeared in a Calvin Klein advertisement, where she mentioned that she dresses in baggy clothes to prevent people from judging her body. In a March 2020 live show in Miami, as part of the Where Do We Go? Tour, she premiered Not My Responsibility, a short film which addresses her experiences of body shaming. Not My Responsibility was uploaded to Eilish's YouTube channel in May 2020.

Eilish was on the cover of the June 2021 issue of British Vogue. The photoshoot by Craig McDean featured her dressed in lingerie, specifically focused on corsets. Eilish made her first appearance at the Met Gala in 2021, which had the theme "In America: A Lexicon of Fashion", wearing an Oscar de la Renta gown under the condition that the fashion house would permanently end its use of real fur. Though the dress was inspired by the original Barbie doll, fashion critics observed its likeness to Golden Age star Marilyn Monroe, who wore a tulle de la Renta gown in the early 1950s.

=== Fanbase ===
In early February 2022, Eilish reached 100 million followers on Instagram, making her the youngest person to do so, at age 20. As of August 2026, she is within the top 35 most-followed Instagram accounts of all time. In March 2021, Eilish uploaded a photo debuting her new blonde hair, which ended up breaking the record for the fastest Instagram post to reach one million likes, in about six minutes. In May, she broke her own record by posting the cover of her collaboration with British Vogue, which reached the milestone in under six minutes. Both posts were, at one point, in the top three and top five most-liked Instagram posts of all time, respectively. From April 4 to April 5, 2024, Eilish gained over eight million followers, breaking the record for the most followers gained in 24 hours by a woman. With over 74 million followers on TikTok, Eilish is the 13th-most-followed individual on the platform.

== Business ventures ==
In March 2018, Eilish released Blōhsh, her clothing merchandise line. In April 2019, Eilish released clothing in collaboration with Takashi Murakami, inspired by her music video for "You Should See Me in a Crown", also directed and animated by Murakami, as well as a limited edition vinyl figure of herself from the video. Eilish also collaborated with Adobe Creative Cloud the same month for a series of advertisements as well as a social media art contest, where users would submit artwork with the hashtag "#BILLIExADOBE".

Eilish appeared in the debut of Calvin Klein's #MyCalvins ad campaign in May 2019, as well as the Ad Council's "Seize the Awkward" campaign, a series of public service announcements targeting mental health awareness. She fronted MCM Worldwide's fall 2019 advertising campaign in July 2019, and later that month collaborated with Los Angeles-based clothing brand Freak City on a clothing line. Also in July 2019, she performed at a dinner hosted by Chanel on Shelter Island to celebrate the brand's pop-up yacht club.

In August 2019, Eilish partnered with Apple Inc. to allow Apple Store customers to experiment with her song "You Should See Me in a Crown" in Music Lab sessions in its stores. Eilish's collaboration with the clothing company Siberia Hills was met with controversy after it was revealed that the company had used plagiarized designs of fan art of the character Nozomi Tojo from Love Live!, drawn by artist Makoto Kurokawa, for Eilish's clothing line. The brand later clarified that Eilish had no knowledge of the plagiarism.

In November 2021, she debuted "Eilish", her perfume brand, which is vegan and cruelty-free. In October 2024, Eilish collaborated with the shoe brand Converse for "Converse x Billie Eilish By You", a limited-time release where Chuck Taylor sneakers could be customized with lyrics from Eilish's songs.

== Achievements ==
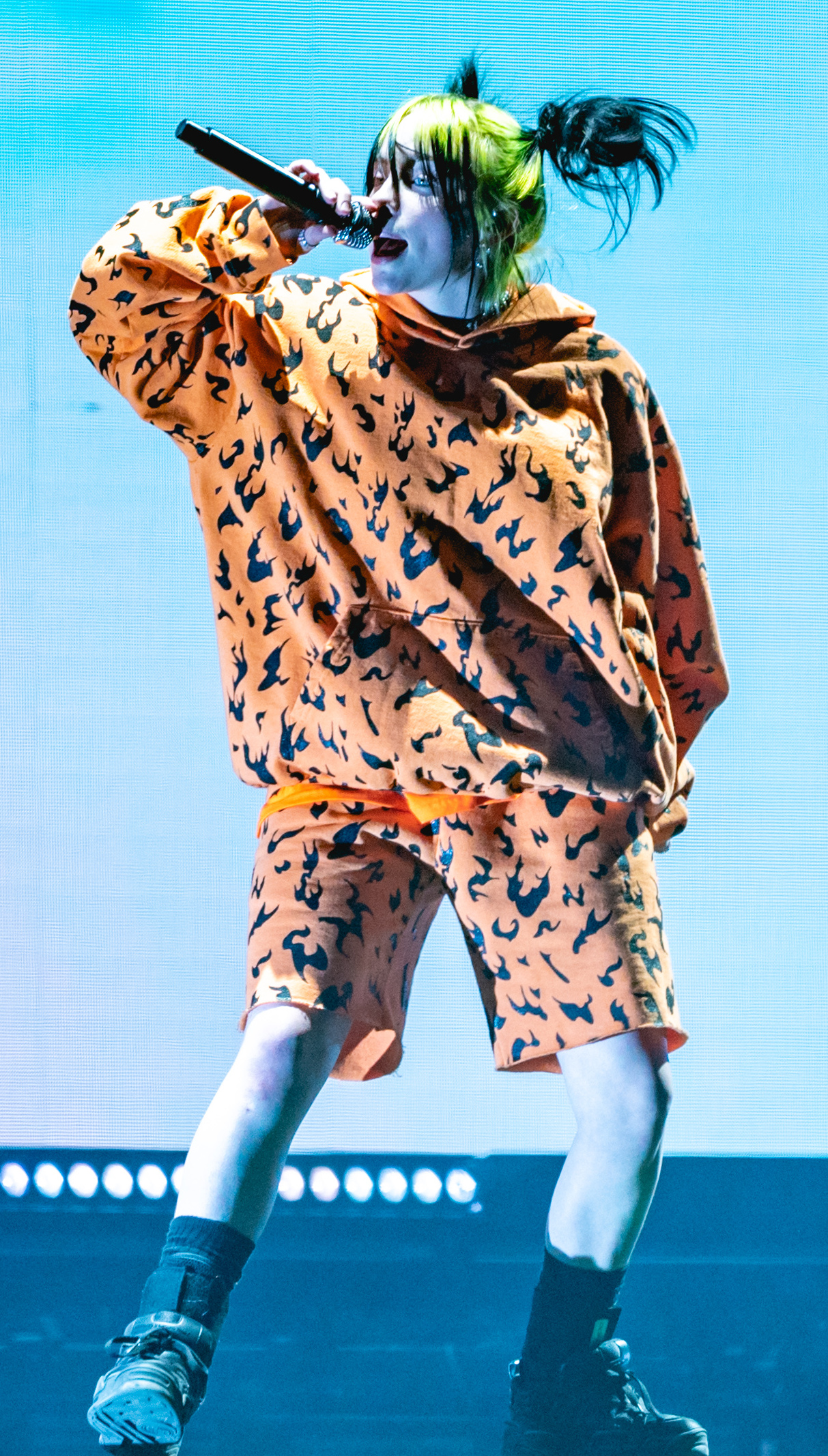
Eilish performing in November 2019 at Corona Capital

Eilish has received numerous awards, including ten Grammy Awards, nine American Music Awards, five MTV Europe Music Awards, eight MTV Video Music Awards, two Academy Awards, two Golden Globes, twenty Guinness World Records, four Brit Awards, and three Billboard Music Awards. According to the Recording Industry Association of America (RIAA) and Billboard, Eilish is the 34th-highest-certified digital singles artist and one of the most successful artists of the 2010s.

Eilish has appeared on lists such as Rolling Stone's 2023 revision of the 200 Greatest Singers of All Time (number 198) and Time's Time 100 Next and Time 100 lists in 2019 and 2021, respectively. In 2019, she was titled Billboard's "Woman of the Year" at age 17, making her the youngest recipient in history. Also in 2019, she debuted as the youngest member on the Forbes 30 under 30 and Forbes 100 Highest-Paid Celebrities lists, earning an estimated $53 million in that year alone. She was honored as one of the BBC 100 Women in December 2022, and was Apple Music's "Artist of the Year" for both 2019 and 2024, making her the first multiple-time winner, and the only as of 2025. In 2025, Billboard ranked her at number 15 on its "Top 100 Women Artists of the 21st Century" list. Her 2024 single "Wildflower" is the longest-charting solo female song on the Billboard Hot 100, spending a total of 72 weeks on the chart.

Alongside Finneas, Eilish holds the record for the most Grammy Award for Song of the Year wins, with three each ("Bad Guy", "What Was I Made For?", and "Wildflower"). She is the second person ever, and the first and only female artist, to win the four main Grammy categories—Best New Artist, Record of the Year, Song of the Year, and Album of the Year—in the same night (2020). That night, she also became the youngest winner of Album of the Year, Record of the Year, and Best Pop Vocal Album, as well as the second-youngest winner of Song of the Year and Best New Artist, at age 18. Seven of her ten Grammy wins are from the Big Four awards, tying her with Adele, Bruno Mars, and Paul Simon as the artists with the most General Field wins. She is the youngest person to win ten Grammys, achieved at age 24. She is also the first person born in the 21st century to win a Grammy.

In 2022, Eilish won the Academy Award for Best Original Song for "No Time to Die" from No Time to Die, becoming the first person born in the 21st century to win an Academy Award. With her 2024 win in the same category for "What Was I Made For?" from Barbie, she became the youngest two-time Academy Award winner, and the song became the tenth song in history to win both an Academy Award for Best Original Song and a Grammy Award for Song of the Year. In September 2021, Eilish became the youngest Met Gala co-chair, making her Met Gala debut that same year, at age 19. She was the first person born in the 21st century to assume this duty. In April 2022, at age 20, she became the youngest person to headline the Coachella festival, breaking the record previously held by Ariana Grande (age 25). Also at age 20, she became the youngest-ever solo headliner of Glastonbury.

In June 2024, Eilish became the third artist and the youngest-ever to surpass 100 million monthly listeners on Spotify, following the Weeknd and Taylor Swift. In August, she became the most-streamed artist worldwide in terms of monthly listeners. Eilish is the eighth-most-streamed artist of all time on Spotify. With over 132 million followers, she is the third-most-followed artist on the platform and the second-most-followed female artist after Swift. Her 2024 album Hit Me Hard and Soft is the fastest album by a female artist to reach 10 billion streams on Spotify; its second single, "Birds of a Feather", was the most-streamed song of 2024 and is the most-streamed solo song by a female artist on the platform. Her 2019 song "Bad Guy" is the most-streamed song by a female artist on Apple Music and is the only song by a female artist within the service's top 10 most-streamed songs of all time.

== Personal life ==
Eilish lived with her parents in the Highland Park neighborhood of Los Angeles until 2019, when she moved out. She said she received a diagnosis of Tourette syndrome at age 11. She also has synesthesia and experienced depression. Eilish has also shared that she experienced sexual abuse as a child. She was raised vegetarian before becoming vegan.

Eilish prefers to keep her sexuality and personal relationships private, but is attracted to both men and women. From 2018 to 2019, she dated rapper Brandon Adams, who goes by the stage name 7:AMP. Eilish then dated actor Matthew Tyler Vorce from 2021 until 2022. She dated singer Jesse Rutherford from October 2022 to May 2023. Since 2025, Eilish has been in a relationship with Nat Wolff.

On a 2020 episode of the me and dad radio podcast, Eilish said: "When I was a little kid, I was super religious for no damn reason. ... And then at one point, ... [I became] almost anti-religious for no reason." She said the experience made her more "open-minded" to other religions. Of her own religion, Eilish said: "I'm in a very neutral position. I'm open to every belief pretty much. [I love] the idea that there's a God. So why not? ... I don't [know], nobody knows."

=== Political activism ===
Eilish has a history of political activism, publicly expressing her views on many political issues. Her views have been described as progressive and left-wing. She has been vocal with regard to environmental causes, including climate change awareness. Among other pursuits, Eilish signed an open letter to world leaders urging them to take action against climate-induced poverty, embarked on an ad campaign encouraging young people to use technology for environmental advocacy, and hosted a six-day climate seminar in London titled "Overheated" to discuss topics such as sustainable fashion and youth activism. Her 2019 single "All the Good Girls Go to Hell" and its subsequent video center around climate change and use heaven-and-hell imagery to criticize ignorance of rising sea levels, and she permitted the nonprofit CoralWatch to use "Ocean Eyes" as part of an online awareness campaign about Australia's Great Barrier Reef. She is a regular advocate on social media for animal rights and veganism, and has criticized the dairy, mink fur, and wool industries. In 2023, Eilish stated she refuses to travel by private jet.

In March 2020, Eilish encouraged fans online to register to vote for the 2020 US presidential election. In August 2020, she performed at the 2020 Democratic National Convention and announced her endorsement of Joe Biden's presidential campaign. In September 2024, Eilish and her brother, Finneas, endorsed Kamala Harris in the 2024 United States presidential election.

Eilish has spoken on multiple occasions about women's rights. She wrote and produced the 2020 short film Not My Responsibility as a response to body shaming toward her and the double standards placed upon women's appearances. "Your Power", one of her 2021 singles, criticizes the sexual exploitation of young women, primarily by men who hold power over them. Eilish associates herself with the US abortion rights movement; she expressed rage when Texas implemented its anti-abortion laws in 2021. During the 2022 Glastonbury Festival, she performed "Your Power" to condemn the overturning of Roe v. Wade. She spoke of the decision: "Today is a really, really dark day for women in the U.S. I'm just going to say that as I cannot bear to think about it any longer in this moment." She included a reference to Roe v. Wade's overturning in her 2022 track "TV", much of which she wrote after a draft of the court decision was leaked online in May.

In 2023, Eilish worked with others to start and fund Reverb's Music Decarbonization Project, aimed at eliminating carbon emissions created by the music industry; as part of the initiative, she used solar powered stage lights during her Lollapalooza set in Chicago that year. Eilish has also been an active voice in advocating for Palestinian rights and calling for a ceasefire during the Gaza war. In December 2023, she signed an open letter from Artists4Ceasefire urging US President Joe Biden to call for a ceasefire in Gaza, which she later promoted by wearing the group's pin at the 2024 Academy Awards. In July 2025, she used her Instagram stories to repost news about an Israeli plan to relocate Palestinians from Gaza and described the proposal as "horrifying", while also sharing content highlighting humanitarian needs such as access to clean water in the territory. In September 2025, Eilish participated in the Together for Palestine campaign, appearing in a video alongside other artists to raise funds and call attention to humanitarian conditions in Palestine.

In October 2025, it was announced at WSJ Magazine's Innovator Awards that Eilish had donated $11.5 million of Hit Me Hard and Soft: The Tour's earnings to various organizations dedicated to food equity and addressing environmental issues. While accepting the "Music Innovator Award", she stated, "If you're a billionaire, why are you a billionaire? No hate, but ... give your money away." Upon learning that Elon Musk was projected to become the world's first trillionaire in November 2025, Eilish reposted various ways that he could redistribute his fortune to her Instagram Stories and called him a "pathetic pussy bitch coward" for hoarding his wealth. In response, Musk wrote on X that Eilish was "not the sharpest tool in the shed".

Following the killing of Renée Good in January 2026, Eilish shared an Instagram post stating ICE is a "terrorist group" and calling for its abolition. She had previously condemned ICE's activities in Los Angeles the prior year. She spoke out on the administration again during her acceptance speech for the 2026 Martin Luther King Jr. Beloved Community Environmental Justice award later that month. During her acceptance speech for Song of the Year at the 68th Annual Grammy Awards in February 2026, Eilish stated that "no one is illegal on stolen land" while denouncing ICE and supporting continued activism for immigrants. Her remarks drew a mix of praise from supporters of immigrant rights and criticism from commentators who argued that they were hypocritical, given her ownership of high-value property on land that was historically inhabited by the Tongva.

== Discography ==
- When We All Fall Asleep, Where Do We Go? (2019)
- Happier Than Ever (2021)
- Hit Me Hard and Soft (2024)

== Tours ==
=== Headlining ===
- Don't Smile at Me Tour (2017)
- Where's My Mind Tour (2018)
- 1 by 1 Tour (2018–2019)
- When We All Fall Asleep Tour (2019)
- Where Do We Go? World Tour (2020)
- Happier Than Ever, The World Tour (2022–2023)
- Hit Me Hard and Soft: The Tour (2024–2025)

=== Opening act ===
- Florence and the Machine – High as Hope Tour (2018)

== Filmography ==
Film
Year	Title	Role	Notes	Ref.
2010	Diary of a Wimpy Kid	Extra only	Film	
2020	Not My Responsibility	Herself	Short film; also writer and producer	
2020	Coachella: 20 Years in the Desert	Herself	Documentary	
2021	Billie Eilish: The World's a Little Blurry	Herself	Documentary	
2021	Happier Than Ever: A Love Letter to Los Angeles	Herself	Concert film	
2022	When Billie Met Lisa	Herself	Voice; short film	
2022	Billie Eilish: Live at the O2	Herself	Concert film	
2023	Billie Eilish: Live at the O2 (Extended Cut)	Herself	Concert film	
2026	Billie Eilish – Hit Me Hard and Soft: The Tour (Live in 3D)	Herself	Concert film; also director and producer	
TBA	The Bell Jar	Esther Greenwood	Post-production	

Television
Year	Title	Role	Notes	Ref.
2019	Saturday Night Live	Herself	Episode: "Woody Harrelson/Billie Eilish"	
2020	Justin Bieber: Seasons	Herself	Episode: "The Finale"	
2021	Saturday Night Live	Herself	Episode: "Billie Eilish"	
2022	Sesame Street	Herself	Episode: "Elmo's Number Adventure"	
2023	Swarm	Eva	Episode: "Running Scared"	
2023	Saturday Night Live	Herself	Episode: "Kate McKinnon/Billie Eilish"	
2024	CBeebies Bedtime Stories	Herself	Episode: "Billie Eilish - This Moose Belongs to Me"	
2024	Saturday Night Live	Herself	Episode: "Michael Keaton/Billie Eilish"	

== See also ==
- List of artists who reached number one in the United States
- List of American Grammy Award winners and nominees
