= Katie and Eilish Holton =

Irish conjoined twins

Katie (24 August 1988 – 4 April 1992) and Eilish Holton (born 24 August 1988) were Irish conjoined twins born to Mary and Liam Holton of Donadea, County Kildare. They were joined from the shoulders down, sharing a single pair of legs, as well as a stomach and liver. In 1992, at 3 1/2 years old, the twins were surgically separated. Katie Holton did not recover from the operation and died of heart failure four days later. The twins were the subject of several newspaper articles and later a two-part television documentary.

== Early life ==
The Holtons learned that there was a chance that the twins were conjoined on August 22, 1988, only two days before they were born. Sharing a single set of legs between them, the girls never learned to walk. This was one of the parents' greatest concerns for their quality of life as they continued to grow. While they were in a supportive community, the parents feared that the girls were sheltered and would have difficulty adjusting to life outside their home as they grew older. After years of deliberation, the Holtons decided that separation was the best chance that Eilish and Katie would have for independent lives.

== Separation and aftermath ==
Conjoined twins' odds of survival varies greatly based on degree of conjunction. Katie and Eilish shared a stomach and a liver, which were large enough to sustain them both, but each had their own heart and lungs. Conjoined, the girls had a normal life expectancy. While separation carries inherent risk, the fact that they had a separate heart and lungs gave them a greater chance of recovering—they were given an estimated 70% chance the operation would be successful.

In 1992, in a nearly 24-hour operation which was initially declared successful, Katie and Eilish were separated. However, Katie's condition declined and she died on April 4, 1992. An autopsy found that her heart was weak. It was possible that, if undetected, her heart condition could have threatened both girls' lives.

Eilish had a long and difficult recovery alone, the first month of which was spent in intensive care. Her separation wound was massive and comparable to a third-degree burn in severity. In a 1995 follow-up documentary, the area was still struggling to heal. In addition to the physical challenges of her recovery, Eilish—who had always been more quiet than her sister—became increasingly reticent. After four months in the hospital, Eilish came home from the hospital.

When asked if they would make the same choice again, Mary said, "If we had known at the time that either child would die, we wouldn't have operated, but in the same set of circumstances, we would do the same thing again. [...] We just try to live in the here-and-now and we think in years to come that Eilish will appreciate the decision we made."

At 6, Eilish was fitted for a prosthetic leg and learned to walk unassisted within weeks. She named the prosthesis Katie.

== In popular culture ==
The Holton twins were the subject of two documentaries: Katie and Eilish: Siamese Twins (1992) and Eilish: Life without Katie (1995).

Eilish Holton was reportedly the inspiration for the name of Billie Eilish, according to the singer's parents.
