= List of awards and nominations received by Billie Eilish =

Billie Eilish awards and nominations
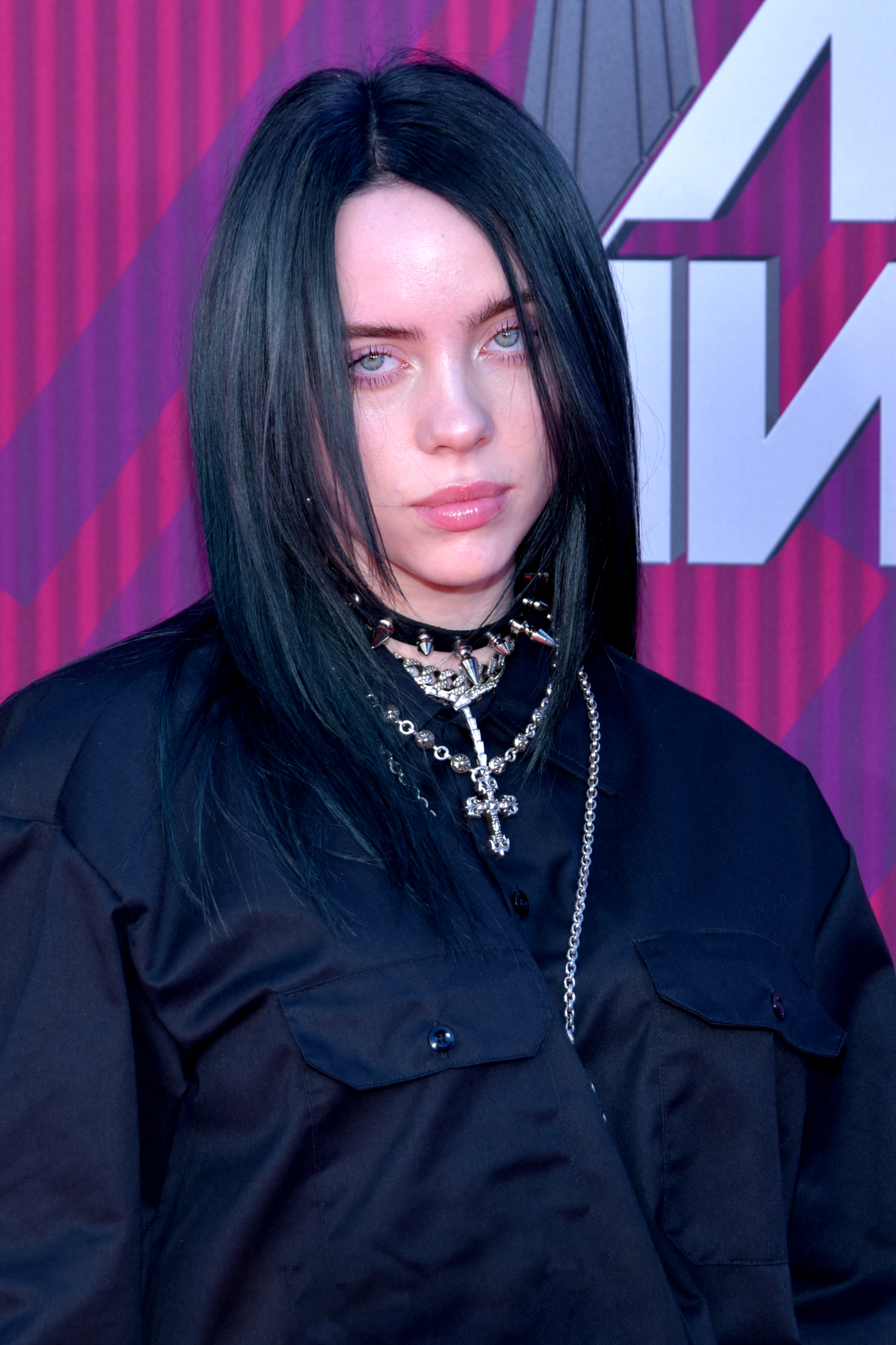
- Eilish at the 2019 iHeartRadio Music Awards
Awards and nominations
Award	Wins	Nominations
Academy Awards	2	2
Golden Globe Awards	2	2
Grammy Awards	10	35

Totals (Note: Certain award groups do not simply award one winner. They acknowledge several different recipients, have runners-up, and have third place. Since this is a specific recognition and is different from losing an award, runner-up mentions are considered wins in this award tally. For simplification and to avoid errors, each award in this list has been presumed to have had a prior nomination.)
- Wins: 174
- Nominations: 474

American singer-songwriter Billie Eilish has won over 170 awards for her work in the music and film industries. For her efforts in music, she has been nominated for 35 Grammy Awards (with 10 wins), 31 MTV Video Music Awards, 17 Billboard Music Awards, 9 Brit Awards, 4 Teen Choice Awards, 10 Nickelodeon Kids' Choice Awards, 2 Golden Globe Awards, and 11 People's Choice Awards. In film, she received two nominations for the Academy Awards, winning both, making her the youngest two-time Academy Award winner in history for any category.

== Major associations ==
=== Academy Awards ===
Year	Category	Nominee / work	Result	Ref.
2022	Best Original Song	"No Time to Die" (from No Time to Die)	Won	
2024	Best Original Song	"What Was I Made For?" (from Barbie)	Won	

=== Golden Globe Awards ===
Year	Category	Nominee / work	Result	Ref.
2022	Best Original Song	"No Time to Die" (from No Time to Die)	Won	
2024	Best Original Song	"What Was I Made For?" (from Barbie)	Won	

=== Grammy Awards ===
Year	Category	Nominee / work	Result	Ref.
2020	Record of the Year	"Bad Guy"	Won	
2020	Song of the Year	"Bad Guy"	Won	
2020	Best Pop Solo Performance	"Bad Guy"	Nominated	
2020	Album of the Year	When We All Fall Asleep, Where Do We Go?	Won	
2020	Best Pop Vocal Album	When We All Fall Asleep, Where Do We Go?	Won	
2020	Best New Artist	Herself	Won	
2021	Record of the Year	"Everything I Wanted"	Won	
2021	Song of the Year	"Everything I Wanted"	Nominated	
2021	Best Pop Solo Performance	"Everything I Wanted"	Nominated	
2021	Best Song Written for Visual Media	"No Time to Die"	Won	
2022	Record of the Year	"Happier Than Ever"	Nominated	
2022	Song of the Year	"Happier Than Ever"	Nominated	
2022	Best Pop Solo Performance	"Happier Than Ever"	Nominated	
2022	Best Music Video	"Happier Than Ever"	Nominated	
2022	Album of the Year	Happier Than Ever	Nominated	
2022	Best Pop Vocal Album	Happier Than Ever	Nominated	
2022	Best Music Film	Happier Than Ever: A Love Letter to Los Angeles	Nominated	
2023	Best Song Written for Visual Media	"Nobody Like U"	Nominated	
2023	Best Music Film	Billie Eilish Live at the O2	Nominated	
2024	Record of the Year	"What Was I Made For?"	Nominated	
2024	Song of the Year	"What Was I Made For?"	Won	
2024	Best Pop Solo Performance	"What Was I Made For?"	Nominated	
2024	Best Song Written for Visual Media	"What Was I Made For?"	Won	
2024	Best Music Video	"What Was I Made For?"	Nominated	
2024	Best Pop Duo/Group Performance	"Never Felt So Alone"	Nominated	
2025	Record of the Year	"Birds of a Feather"	Nominated	
2025	Song of the Year	"Birds of a Feather"	Nominated	
2025	Best Pop Solo Performance	"Birds of a Feather"	Nominated	
2025	Album of the Year	Hit Me Hard and Soft	Nominated	
2025	Best Pop Vocal Album	Hit Me Hard and Soft	Nominated	
2025	Best Pop Duo/Group Performance	"Guess"	Nominated	
2025	Best Dance Pop Recording	"L'Amour de Ma Vie (Over Now Extended Edit)"	Nominated	
2026	Record of the Year	"Wildflower"	Nominated	
2026	Song of the Year	"Wildflower"	Won	
2027	Best Music Film	Hit Me Hard and Soft: The Tour (Live in 3D)	Pending	

== Miscellaneous awards ==
Name of the award ceremony, year presented, nominee(s) of the award, award category, and the result of the nomination
Award ceremony	Year (Note: Indicates the year of ceremony. Each year is linked to the article about the awards held that year, wherever possible.)	Category	Nominee / work	Result	Ref.
American Cinematheque	2022	Tribute to the Crafts – Feature Film	"No Time to Die"	Won	
American Music Awards	2019	New Artist of the Year	Billie Eilish	Won	
American Music Awards	2019	Favorite Social Artist	Billie Eilish	Nominated	
American Music Awards	2019	Favorite Pop/Rock Female Artist	Billie Eilish	Nominated	
American Music Awards	2019	Favorite Alternative Artist	Billie Eilish	Won	
American Music Awards	2019	Favorite Music Video	"Bad Guy"	Nominated	
American Music Awards	2019	Favorite Pop/Rock Album	When We All Fall Asleep, Where Do We Go?	Nominated	
American Music Awards	2020	Favorite Alternative Artist	Billie Eilish	Nominated	
American Music Awards	2020	Favorite Social Artist	Billie Eilish	Nominated	
American Music Awards	2025	Artist of the Year	Billie Eilish	Won	
American Music Awards	2025	Favorite Female Pop Artist	Billie Eilish	Won	
American Music Awards	2025	Favorite Touring Artist	Billie Eilish	Won	
American Music Awards	2025	Album of the Year	Hit Me Hard and Soft	Won	
American Music Awards	2025	Favorite Pop Album	Hit Me Hard and Soft	Won	
American Music Awards	2025	Song of the Year	"Birds of a Feather"	Won	
American Music Awards	2025	Favorite Pop Song	"Birds of a Feather"	Won	
Annie Awards	2023	Outstanding Achievement for Music in a Feature Production	Turning Red (Billie Eilish, Finneas O'Connell, Ludwig Göransson)	Nominated	
Apple Music Awards	2019	Global Artist of the Year	Billie Eilish	Won	
Apple Music Awards	2019	Songwriter of the Year	Billie Eilish	Won	
Apple Music Awards	2019	Album of the Year	When We All Fall Asleep, Where Do We Go?	Won	
Apple Music Awards	2024	100 Best Albums	When We All Fall Asleep, Where Do We Go?	Listed	
Apple Music Awards	2024	Artist of the Year	Billie Eilish	Won	
ARIA Charts Awards	2020	International Artist of the Year	Billie Eilish	Won	
ARIA Music Awards	2019	Best International Artist	When We All Fall Asleep, Where Do We Go?	Nominated	
ARIA Music Awards	2022	Best International Artist	Happier Than Ever	Nominated	
ARIA Music Awards	2024	Best International Artist	Hit Me Hard and Soft	Nominated	
Art Directors Club Awards	2022	Craft in Motion / Film / Direction	Billie Eilish x Beat Saber	Silver	
Art Directors Club Awards	2022	Motion / Film / Short Video - Single	Billie Eilish x Beat Saber	Bronze	
Art Directors Club Awards	2022	Television / Film / Online Video / Online - Single	Billie Eilish x Beat Saber	Merit	
ASCAP Pop Music Awards	2019	Vanguard Award	Billie Eilish & Finneas	Won	
ASCAP Pop Music Awards	2020	Award Winning Songs	"Bad Guy"	Won	
ASCAP Pop Music Awards	2021	Award Winning Songs	"Everything I Wanted"	Won	
ASCAP Pop Music Awards	2022	Award Winning Songs	"Therefore I Am"	Won	
ASCAP Screen Music Awards	2022	Top Streaming Films	Billie Eilish: The World's a Little Blurry	Won	
BBC Radio 1's Teen Awards	2018	Best Social Media Star	Billie Eilish	Nominated	
BBC Radio 1's Teen Awards	2019	Best International Solo Artist	Billie Eilish	Nominated	
BBC Radio 1's Teen Awards	2019	Best Single	"Bad Guy"	Nominated	
Berlin Music Video Awards	2019	Best VFX	"Hostage"	Nominated	
Berlin Commercial Awards	2023	Music Video (Craft: Editing)	"Never Felt So Alone" (with Labrinth)	Nominated	
Empik Bestsellers Awards	2025	Hit Me Hard and Soft	Music: Pop & rock	Nominated	
Billboard Live Music Awards	2019	Concert and Marketing Promotions	Uber Eats x Khalid x Billie Eilish Activation at South by South	Nominated	
Billboard Music Awards	2020	Top Artist	Billie Eilish	Nominated	
Billboard Music Awards	2020	Top New Artist	Billie Eilish	Won	
Billboard Music Awards	2020	Top Female Artist	Billie Eilish	Won	
Billboard Music Awards	2020	Top Billboard 200 Artist	Billie Eilish	Nominated	
Billboard Music Awards	2020	Top Hot 100 Artist	Billie Eilish	Nominated	
Billboard Music Awards	2020	Top Streaming Songs Artist	Billie Eilish	Nominated	
Billboard Music Awards	2020	Top Song Sales Artist	Billie Eilish	Nominated	
Billboard Music Awards	2020	Top Social Artist	Billie Eilish	Nominated	
Billboard Music Awards	2020	Top Billboard 200 Album	When We All Fall Asleep, Where Do We Go?	Won	
Billboard Music Awards	2020	Top Hot 100 Song	"Bad Guy"	Nominated	
Billboard Music Awards	2020	Top Streaming Song	"Bad Guy"	Nominated	
Billboard Music Awards	2020	Top Selling Song	"Bad Guy"	Nominated	
Billboard Music Awards	2021	Top Female Artist	Billie Eilish	Nominated	
Billboard Music Awards	2024	Top Female Artist	Billie Eilish	Nominated	
Billboard Music Awards	2024	Top Hot 100 Artist	Billie Eilish	Nominated	
Billboard Music Awards	2024	Top Billboard Global 200 Artist	Billie Eilish	Nominated	
Billboard Music Awards	2024	Top Billboard Global (Excl. U.S.) Artist	Billie Eilish	Nominated	
Billboard Women in Music	2019	Women of the Year	Billie Eilish	Won	
Bravo Otto	2020	Best International Singer	Billie Eilish	Gold	
Bravo Otto	2021	Best International Singer	Billie Eilish	Bronze	
Bravo Otto	2022	Best International Singer	Billie Eilish	Silver	
Bravo Otto	2024	Best International Singer	Billie Eilish	Silver	
Bravo Otto	2025	Best International Singer	Billie Eilish	Gold	
Brit Awards	2020	International Female Solo Artist	Billie Eilish	Won	
Brit Awards	2021	International Female Solo Artist	Billie Eilish	Won	
Brit Awards	2022	International Artist of the Year	Billie Eilish	Won	
Brit Awards	2022	International Song of the Year	"Happier Than Ever"	Nominated	
Brit Awards	2024	International Song of the Year	"What Was I Made For?"	Nominated	
Brit Awards	2025	International Song of the Year	"Birds of a Feather"	Nominated	
Brit Awards	2025	International Artist of the Year	Billie Eilish	Nominated	
Brit Awards	2025	Song of the Year	"Guess" (with Charli XCX)	Won	
British LGBT Awards	2019	LGBT+ Music Artist	Billie Eilish	Nominated	
Cannes Lions International Festival of Creativity	2022	Entertainment Lions For Music (Music Content)	Billie Eilish x Beat Saber (Meta Quest [fka Oculus])	Nominated	
Cannes Lions International Festival of Creativity	2022	Entertainment (Talent)	Billie X Adobe Partnership	Nominated	
Capri Hollywood International Film Festival	2022	Best Original Song	"No Time to Die"	Won	
CD Shop Awards	2020	Western Music	When We All Fall Asleep, Where Do We Go?	Won	
Cinema Eye Honors Awards	2022	Audience Choice Prize	Billie Eilish: The World's a Little Blurry	Nominated	
Clio Awards	2022	Other (Print & Out Of Home Craft)	Billie Eilish x Beat Saber (Meta Quest [fka Oculus])	Nominated	
Clio Awards	2023	Film - Scripted (Branded Entertainment & Content)	The Simpsons - When Billie Met Lisa	Bronze	
Clio Music Awards	2019	Music Videos (Film/Video)	"When the Party's Over"	Gold	
Clio Music Awards	2019	Event Design (Design)	Billie Eilish Experience (Spotify In House)	Gold	
Clio Music Awards	2019	61 Seconds to Five Minutes (Use of Music)	Share Your Gifts (Apple)	Grand Gold	
Clio Music Awards	2022	31 seconds to 60 seconds (Film/Video)	Billie X Adobe: Create What's True To You (Adobe)	Silver	
Clio Music Awards	2022	Visual Effects (Film/Video Craft)	Billie X Adobe: Create What's True To You (Adobe)	Silver	
Clio Music Awards	2022	Out of Home (Design)	Billie Eilish x Beat Saber (Meta Quest [fka Oculus])	Silver	
Clio Music Awards	2022	Posters & Printed Materials (Design)	Billie Eilish x Beat Saber (Meta Quest [fka Oculus])	Silver	
Clio Music Awards	2022	61 Seconds to Five Minutes (Film/Video)	Billie Eilish x Beat Saber (Meta Quest [fka Oculus])	Bronze	
Clio Music Awards	2022	Brand and Artist Collaboration Integrated Campaign (Integrated Campaign)	Billie Eilish x Beat Saber (Meta Quest [fka Oculus])	Bronze	
Costume Designers Guild Awards	2024	Vanguard Spotlight Award	Billie Eilish	Won	
Critics' Choice Movie Awards	2022	Best Song	"No Time to Die"	Won	
Critics' Choice Movie Awards	2024	Best Song	"What Was I Made For?"	Nominated	
D&AD Awards	2022	Sound Design & Use of Music (Existing Music)	Billie Eilish x Beat Saber	Nominated	
Danish Music Awards	2019	Foreign Album of the Year	When We All Fall Asleep, Where Do We Go?	Won	
Danish Music Awards	2020	Foreign Hit of the Year	"Everything I Wanted"	Nominated	
Effie Awards (United States)	2023	Brand Integration & Entertainment Partnerships	Billie X Adobe: Create What's True To You (Adobe)	Gold	
Environmental Media Awards	2022	EMA Missions in Music Award	Billie Eilish & Maggie Baird	Won	
Emma Gaala	2020	Best-Selling Album of the Year	When We All Fall Asleep, Where Do We Go?	Won	
Excellence In Concessions Awards	2025	Best Sustainability Initiative	Hit Me Hard and Soft: The Tour	Won	
FiFi Awards (United States)	2022	Fragrance of the Year - Popular	Eilish Eau de Parfum	Won	
FiFi Awards (United States)	2022	Consumer Choice - Women's Popular	Eilish Eau de Parfum	Won	
FiFi Awards (United States)	2023	Consumer Choice - Women's Popular	Eilish No. 2 Eau de Parfum	Won	
FiFi Awards (United States)	2023	Fragrance of the Year - Popular	Eilish No. 2 Eau de Parfum	Nominated	
FiFi Awards (United States)	2023	Packaging of the Year - Prestige / Popular	Eilish No. 2 Eau de Parfum	Nominated	
FiFi Awards (United States)	2024	Fragrance of the Year - Popular	Eilish No. 3 Eau de Parfum	Nominated	
FiFi Awards (United States)	2024	Consumer Choice - Women's Popular	Eilish No. 3 Eau de Parfum	Won	
FiFi Awards (United Kingdom)	2023	People's Choice Award	Eilish Eau de Parfum	Nominated	
FiFi Awards (United Kingdom)	2023	Best New Fragrance In National Distribution	Eilish Eau de Parfum	Nominated	
FiFi Awards (United Kingdom)	2024	Readers' Choice Award	Eilish No. 2 Eau de Parfum	Won	
Fonogram - Hungarian Music Awards	2020	International Pop-Rock Album of the Year	When We All Fall Asleep, Where Do We Go?	Won	
Fonogram - Hungarian Music Awards	2022	International Pop-Rock Album of the Year	Happier Than Ever	Nominated	
GAFFA Awards (Denmark)	2020	International Album of the Year	When We All Fall Asleep, Where Do We Go?	Won	
GAFFA Awards (Denmark)	2020	International Solo Artist of the Year	Billie Eilish	Won	
GAFFA Awards (Denmark)	2020	International New Artist of the Year	Billie Eilish	Won	
GAFFA Awards (Denmark)	2020	International Hit of the Year	"Bad Guy"	Won	
GAFFA Awards (Denmark)	2021	International Hit of the Year	"No Time to Die"	Nominated	
GAFFA Awards (Denmark)	2022	International Solo Artist of the Year	Billie Eilish	Nominated	
GAFFA Awards (Denmark)	2022	International Album of the Year	Happier Than Ever	Nominated	
GAFFA Awards (Denmark)	2025	International Album of the Year	Hit Me Hard and Soft	Won	
GAFFA Awards (Denmark)	2025	International Hit of the Year	Birds of a Feather	Won	
GAFFA Awards (Sweden)	2019	International New Act of the Year	Billie Eilish	Won	
GAFFA Awards (Sweden)	2020	International Album of the Year	When We All Fall Asleep, Where Do We Go?	Won	
GAFFA Awards (Sweden)	2020	International Hit of the Year	"Bad Guy"	Won	
GAFFA Awards (Sweden)	2020	International Solo Artist of the Year	Billie Eilish	Won	
GAFFA Awards (Sweden)	2021	Best Foreign Song	"No Time to Die"	Nominated	
GAFFA Awards (Sweden)	2024	International Song of the Year	"What Was I Made For?"	Won	
GAFFA Awards (Sweden)	2025	International Song of the Year	"Birds of a Feather"	Won	
GAFFA Awards (Sweden)	2025	International Album of the Year	"Hit Me Hard and Soft"	Won	
Gaon Chart Music Awards	2020	International Rising Star of the Year	Billie Eilish	Won	
Gaygalan Awards	2020	Song of the Year	"Bad Guy"	Nominated	
Georgia Film Critics Association	2022	Best Original Song	"No Time to Die"	Won	
Georgia Film Critics Association	2024	Best Original Song	"What Was I Made For?"	Won	
German Sustainability Award	2021	Honorary Award	Billie Eilish	Won	
Global Awards	2020	Best Female	Billie Eilish	Nominated	
Global Awards	2020	Best Song	"Bad Guy"	Nominated	
Guild of Music Supervisors Awards	2024	Best Song Written and/or Recording Created for a Film	"What Was I Made For?"	Won	
HCA Astra Film Awards (Note: The Hollywood Critics Association Film Awards became the Hollywood Creative Alliance Astra Film Awards in 2023, now operating as a subcategory under the Astra Awards within the Hollywood Creative Alliance.)	2022	Best Original Song	"No Time to Die"	Nominated	
HCA Astra Creative Arts Awards (Note: The Hollywood Critics Association Creative Arts Awards became the Hollywood Creative Alliance Astra Creative Arts Awards in 2023, now operating as a subcategory under the Astra Awards within the Hollywood Creative Alliance.)	2023	Best Original Song	"Nobody Like U"	Nominated	
HCA Astra Creative Arts Awards	2024	Best Original Song	"What Was I Made For?"	Nominated	
Hit FM Music Awards	2020	New Artist of the Year	Billie Eilish	Won	
Hit FM Music Awards	2020	Entertainer of the Year	Billie Eilish	Nominated	
Hit FM Music Awards	2020	Female Artist of the Year	Billie Eilish	Nominated	
Hit FM Music Awards	2020	Top Ten Singles	"Bad Guy"	Won	
Hit FM Music Awards	2020	Top Ten Singles	"Bury a Friend"	Nominated	
Hit FM Music Awards	2021	Best Original Song of the Year	"No Time to Die"	Won	
Hit FM Music Awards	2021	Live Act of the Year	"Everything I Wanted"	Nominated	
Hit FM Music Awards	2022	Live Act of the Year	Billie Eilish	Nominated	
Hit FM Music Awards	2022	Female Artist of the Year	Billie Eilish	Nominated	
Hit FM Music Awards	2022	Top Ten Singles	"NDA"	Nominated	
Hit FM Music Awards	2024	Top Ten Singles	"What Was I Made For?"	Won	
Hit FM Music Awards	2024	Collaboration of the Year	"Never Felt So Alone" (with Labrinth)	Nominated	
Hollywood Music in Media Awards	2021	Best Original Song in a Feature Film	"No Time to Die"	Won	
Hollywood Music in Media Awards	2021	Live Concert for a Visual Medium	Billie Eilish live at Global Citizen Festival	Nominated	
Hollywood Music in Media Awards	2022	Best Original Song in an Animated Film	"Nobody Like U"	Nominated	
Hollywood Music in Media Awards	2023	Best Original Song in a Feature Film	"What Was I Made For?"	Won	
Hollywood Music Video Awards	2025	Best Live Performance (Note: The winning recipient is for Amazon Music's Songline performance.)	"Wildflower"	Won	
Houston Film Critics Society Awards	2022	Best Original Song	"No Time to Die"	Nominated	
Houston Film Critics Society Awards	2024	Best Original Song	"What Was I Made For?"	Nominated	
Huading Awards	2022	Best Global Original Song	"No Time to Die"	Won	
IFPI Awards	2020	Biggest Global Single of the Year	"Bad Guy"	Won	
iHeartRadio MMVAs	2018	Fan Fave New Artist	Billie Eilish	Nominated	
iHeartRadio Music Awards	2019	Best New Rock/Alternative Artist	Billie Eilish	Nominated	
iHeartRadio Music Awards	2020	Female Artist of the Year	Billie Eilish	Won	
iHeartRadio Music Awards	2020	Alternative Rock Artist of the Year	Billie Eilish	Won	
iHeartRadio Music Awards	2020	Song of the Year	"Bad Guy"	Nominated	
iHeartRadio Music Awards	2020	Alternative Rock Song of the Year	"Bad Guy"	Won	
iHeartRadio Music Awards	2020	Best Lyrics	"Bad Guy"	Nominated	
iHeartRadio Music Awards	2020	Best Music Video	"Bad Guy"	Nominated	
iHeartRadio Music Awards	2020	Best Remix	"Bad Guy (Remix)" (with Justin Bieber)	Nominated	
iHeartRadio Music Awards	2020	Alternative Rock Album of the Year	When We All Fall Asleep, Where Do We Go?	Won	
iHeartRadio Music Awards	2021	Female Artist of the Year	Billie Eilish	Nominated	
iHeartRadio Music Awards	2021	Alternative Rock Artist of the Year	Billie Eilish	Nominated	
iHeartRadio Music Awards	2021	Alternative Rock Song of the Year	"Everything I Wanted"	Nominated	
iHeartRadio Music Awards	2021	Best Lyrics	"Everything I Wanted"	Nominated	
iHeartRadio Music Awards	2022	Alternative Album of the Year	Happier Than Ever	Won	
iHeartRadio Music Awards	2022	Alternative Artist of the Year	Billie Eilish	Nominated	
iHeartRadio Music Awards	2022	Best Lyrics	"Your Power"	Nominated	
iHeartRadio Music Awards	2022	Best Lyrics	“Happier Than Ever”	Nominated	
iHeartRadio Music Awards	2024	Best Lyrics	"What Was I Made For?"	Nominated	
iHeartRadio Music Awards	2024	Best Music Video	"What Was I Made For?"	Nominated	
iHeartRadio Music Awards	2024	TikTok Bop of the Year	"What Was I Made For?"	Nominated	
iHeartRadio Music Awards	2025	Album of the Year	Hit Me Hard and Soft	Won	
iHeartRadio Music Awards	2025	Artist of the Year	Billie Eilish	Nominated	
iHeartRadio Music Awards	2025	Pop Artist of the Year	Billie Eilish	Nominated	
iHeartRadio Music Awards	2025	Best Lyrics	"Birds of a Feather"	Nominated	
iHeartRadio Music Awards	2025	Favorite Tour Style	Hit Me Hard and Soft: The Tour	Nominated	
iHeartRadio Music Awards	2026	Favorite Tour Style	Hit Me Hard and Soft: The Tour	Nominated	
iHeartRadio Music Awards	2026	Favorite Tour Tradition	"When the Party's Over" Loop	Nominated	
iHeartRadio Titanium Awards	2021	One Billion Total Audience Spins	"Bad Guy"	Won	
Independent Spirit Awards	2024	Best Supporting Performance in a New Scripted Series	Swarm	Nominated	
Joox Indonesia Music Awards	2021	International Artist of the Year	Billie Eilish	Nominated	
Joox Malaysia Music Awards	2020	Top 5 International Artists of the Year	Billie Eilish	Nominated	
Joox Malaysia Music Awards	2020	Top 5 International Songs of the Year	"No Time to Die"	Nominated	
Juno Awards	2020	International Album of the Year	When We All Fall Asleep, Where Do We Go?	Won	
Latino Entertainment Journalists Association Film Awards	2022	Best Song Written for a Film	"No Time to Die"	Nominated	
Latino Entertainment Journalists Association Film Awards	2024	Best Song Written for a Film	"What Was I Made For?"	Nominated	
LOS40 Music Awards	2019	Best International New Artist	Billie Eilish	Nominated	
LOS40 Music Awards	2019	Best International Album	When We All Fall Asleep, Where Do We Go?	Won	
LOS40 Music Awards	2019	Best International Video	"Bad Guy"	Nominated	
LOS40 Music Awards	2024	Best International Album	Hit Me Hard and Soft	Nominated	
Love Perfume Awards	2022	Best Celeb Launch	Eilish Eau de Parfum	Nominated	
Love Perfume Awards	2022	Best Design	Eilish Eau de Parfum	Nominated	
Melon Music Awards	2019	Top 10 Artists	Billie Eilish	Longlisted	
Melon Music Awards	2019	Best Pop Song	"Bad Guy"	Won	
Melon Music Awards	2019	Best Song	"Bad Guy"	Nominated	
Meus Prêmios Nick	2020	Favorite International Artist	Billie Eilish	Nominated	
Meus Prêmios Nick	2020	Fandom of the Year	Billie Eilish	Nominated	
Meus Prêmios Nick	2020	Favorite International Hit	"Everything I Wanted"	Nominated	
MLK, Jr. Beloved Community Awards	2026	Environmental Justice Award	Billie Eilish	Won	
MTV Europe Music Awards	2019	Best Song	"Bad Guy"	Won	
MTV Europe Music Awards	2019	Best Video	"Bad Guy"	Nominated	
MTV Europe Music Awards	2019	Best New Act	Billie Eilish	Won	
MTV Europe Music Awards	2019	Best Push Act	Billie Eilish	Nominated	
MTV Europe Music Awards	2019	Biggest Fans	Billie Eilish	Nominated	
MTV Europe Music Awards	2019	Best US Act	Billie Eilish	Nominated	
MTV Europe Music Awards	2020	Best Video	"Everything I Wanted"	Nominated	
MTV Europe Music Awards	2021	Video for Good	"Your Power"	Won	
MTV Europe Music Awards	2022	Best US Act	Billie Eilish	Won	
MTV Europe Music Awards	2022	Best Pop	Billie Eilish	Nominated	
MTV Europe Music Awards	2023	Best Pop	Billie Eilish	Won	
MTV Europe Music Awards	2023	Biggest Fans	Billie Eilish	Nominated	
MTV Europe Music Awards	2024	Best Artist	Billie Eilish	Nominated	
MTV Europe Music Awards	2024	Best Pop	Billie Eilish	Nominated	
MTV Europe Music Awards	2024	Biggest Fans	Billie Eilish	Nominated	
MTV Europe Music Awards	2024	Best Song	"Birds of a Feather"	Nominated	
MTV Europe Music Awards	2024	Best Collaboration	"Guess featuring Billie Eilish"	Nominated	
MTV Millennial Awards	2019	Global Instagrammer	Billie Eilish	Nominated	
MTV Millennial Awards	2019	Global Hit	"Bad Guy"	Won	
MTV Millennial Awards	2021	Celebrity Crush	Billie Eilish	Nominated	
MTV Millennial Awards	2021	Music-Ship of the Year	"Lo Vas a Olvidar" (with Rosalía)	Nominated	
MTV Millennial Awards	2022	Global Hit	"Happier Than Ever"	Nominated	
MTV Millennial Awards Brazil	2020	Global Hit	"Everything I Wanted"	Nominated	
MTV Movie & TV Awards	2021	Best Music Documentary	Billie Eilish: The World's a Little Blurry	Nominated	
MTV Video Music Awards	2019	Artist of the Year	Billie Eilish	Nominated	
MTV Video Music Awards	2019	Best New Artist	Billie Eilish	Won	
MTV Video Music Awards	2019	Push Artist of the Year	Billie Eilish	Won	
MTV Video Music Awards	2019	Video of the Year	"Bad Guy"	Nominated	
MTV Video Music Awards	2019	Best Pop Video	"Bad Guy"	Nominated	
MTV Video Music Awards	2019	Best Direction	"Bad Guy"	Nominated	
MTV Video Music Awards	2019	Best Editing	"Bad Guy"	Won	
MTV Video Music Awards	2019	Song of Summer	"Bad Guy"	Nominated	
MTV Video Music Awards	2019	Best Visual Effects	"When the Party's Over"	Nominated	
MTV Video Music Awards	2019	Best Cinematography	"Hostage"	Nominated	
MTV Video Music Awards	2020	Video of the Year	"Everything I Wanted"	Nominated	
MTV Video Music Awards	2020	Song of the Year	"Everything I Wanted"	Nominated	
MTV Video Music Awards	2020	Video for Good	"All the Good Girls Go to Hell"	Nominated	
MTV Video Music Awards	2020	Best Cinematography	"All the Good Girls Go to Hell"	Nominated	
MTV Video Music Awards	2020	Best Visual Effects	"All the Good Girls Go to Hell"	Nominated	
MTV Video Music Awards	2020	Best Direction	"Xanny"	Nominated	
MTV Video Music Awards	2021	Best Pop	"Therefore I Am"	Nominated	
MTV Video Music Awards	2021	Best Cinematography	"Therefore I Am"	Nominated	
MTV Video Music Awards	2021	Best Latin	"Lo Vas a Olvidar" (with Rosalía)	Won	
MTV Video Music Awards	2021	Video for Good	"Your Power"	Won	
MTV Video Music Awards	2021	Best Direction	"Your Power"	Nominated	
MTV Video Music Awards	2021	Song of Summer	"Happier Than Ever"	Nominated	
MTV Video Music Awards	2022	Song of the Year	"Happier Than Ever"	Won	
MTV Video Music Awards	2022	Best Pop	"Happier Than Ever"	Nominated	
MTV Video Music Awards	2022	Best Direction	"Happier Than Ever"	Nominated	
MTV Video Music Awards	2022	Best Visual Effects	"Happier Than Ever"	Nominated	
MTV Video Music Awards	2022	Best Longform Video	Happier Than Ever: A Love Letter to Los Angeles	Nominated	
MTV Video Music Awards	2023	Song of Summer	"What Was I Made For?"	Nominated	
MTV Video Music Awards	2024	Video for Good	"What Was I Made For?"	Won	
MTV Video Music Awards	2024	Video of the Year	"Lunch"	Nominated	
MTV Video Music Awards	2024	Song of Summer	"Birds of a Feather"	Nominated	
MTV Video Music Awards	2024	Song of Summer	"Guess featuring Billie Eilish"	Nominated	
MTV Video Music Awards	2025	Video for Good	"Guess featuring Billie Eilish"	Won	
MTV Video Music Awards	2025	Best Direction	"Guess featuring Billie Eilish"	Nominated	
MTV Video Music Awards	2025	Best Art Direction	"Guess featuring Billie Eilish"	Nominated	
MTV Video Music Awards	2025	Best Editing	"Guess featuring Billie Eilish"	Nominated	
MTV Video Music Awards	2025	Video of the Year	"Birds of a Feather"	Nominated	
MTV Video Music Awards	2025	Song of the Year	"Birds of a Feather"	Nominated	
MTV Video Music Awards Japan	2019	Best New International Artist Video	"Bad Guy"	Won	
MTV Video Music Awards Japan	2019	Video of the Year	"Bad Guy"	Nominated	
MTV Video Music Awards Japan	2021	Best International Solo Artist Video	"Happier Than Ever"	Won	
MTV Video Play Awards	2019	Winning Video	"Bad Guy"	Won	
Music Awards Japan	2025	Best International Alternative Song in Japan	"Birds of a Feather"	Won	
Music Forward Foundation Awards	2023	Tour Honoree	Happier Than Ever, The World Tour	Won	
New Music Awards	2020	Top 40 / CHR Song of the Year	"Bad Guy"	Won	
New Music Awards	2020	Top 40 / CHR Female Artist of the Year	Billie Eilish	Won	
New Music Awards	2021	Top 40 / CHR Female Artist of the Year	Billie Eilish	Won	
New Music Awards	2022	Top 40 / CHR Female Artist of the Year	Billie Eilish	Nominated	
New Music Awards	2022	AC Female Artist of the Year	Billie Eilish	Won	
New Music Awards	2024	AC Female Artist of the Year	Billie Eilish	Nominated	
Nickelodeon Kids' Choice Awards	2019	Favorite Breakout Artist	Billie Eilish	Won	
Nickelodeon Kids' Choice Awards	2020	Favorite Female Artist	Billie Eilish	Nominated	
Nickelodeon Kids' Choice Awards	2020	Favorite Song	"Bad Guy"	Won	
Nickelodeon Kids' Choice Awards	2021	Favorite Female Artist	Billie Eilish	Nominated	
Nickelodeon Kids' Choice Awards	2022	Favorite Female Artist	Billie Eilish	Nominated	
Nickelodeon Kids' Choice Awards	2022	Favorite Song	"Happier Than Ever"	Won	
Nickelodeon Kids' Choice Awards	2022	Favorite Album	Happier Than Ever	Won	
Nickelodeon Kids' Choice Awards	2023	Favorite Female Artist	Billie Eilish	Nominated	
Nickelodeon Kids' Choice Awards	2024	Favorite Female Artist	Billie Eilish	Nominated	
Nickelodeon Kids' Choice Awards	2024	Favorite Song	"What Was I Made For?"	Won	
Nickelodeon Kids' Choice Awards	2025	Favorite Female Artist	Billie Eilish	Nominated	
Nickelodeon Kids' Choice Awards	2025	Favorite Song	"Wildflower"	Nominated	
Nickelodeon Kids’ Choice Awards Abu Dhabi	2019	Favorite International Star	Billie Eilish	Won	
NRJ Music Awards	2019	International Breakthrough of the Year	Billie Eilish	Won	
NRJ Music Awards	2019	Video of the Year	"Bad Guy"	Nominated	
NRJ Music Awards	2020	International Female Artist of the Year	Billie Eilish	Nominated	
NRJ Music Awards	2021	International Female Artist of the Year	Billie Eilish	Nominated	
NRJ Music Awards	2024	International Female Artist of the Year	Billie Eilish	Nominated	
NME Awards	2020	Best Album in the World	When We All Fall Asleep, Where Do We Go?	Nominated	
NME Awards	2020	Best Song in the World	"Bad Guy"	Won	
NME Awards	2020	Best Solo Act in the World	Billie Eilish	Nominated	
NME Awards	2022	Best Festival Headliner	Billie Eilish	Nominated	
NME Awards	2022	Best Music Video	"Happier Than Ever"	Nominated	
NME Awards	2022	Best Music Film	Happier Than Ever: A Love Letter To Los Angeles	Nominated	
NME Awards	2022	Best Solo Act in the World	Billie Eilish	Nominated	
Online Film Critics Society Awards	2024	Technical Achievements: Original Song	"What Was I Made For?"	Won	
Palm Springs International Film Festival	2024	Chairman's Award	"What Was I Made For?"	Won	
People's Choice Awards	2019	Song of the Year	"Bad Guy"	Nominated	
People's Choice Awards	2019	Music Video of the Year	"Bad Guy"	Nominated	
People's Choice Awards	2019	Album of the Year	When We All Fall Asleep, Where Do We Go?	Nominated	
People's Choice Awards	2019	Female Artist of the Year	Billie Eilish	Won	
People's Choice Awards	2020	Female Artist of the Year	Billie Eilish	Nominated	
People's Choice Awards	2021	Female Artist of the Year	Billie Eilish	Nominated	
People's Choice Awards	2021	Album of the Year	Happier Than Ever	Nominated	
People's Choice Awards	2021	Pop Special of the Year	Billie Eilish: The World's a Little Blurry	Nominated	
People's Choice Awards	2022	Concert Tour of the Year	Happier Than Ever, The World Tour	Nominated	
People's Choice Awards	2024	Pop Artist of the Year	Billie Eilish	Nominated	
People's Choice Awards	2024	TV Performance of the Year	Swarm	Won	
Pollstar Awards	2019	Best New Headliner	Billie Eilish	Nominated	
Pollstar Awards	2020	Best New Headliner	Billie Eilish	Won	
Pollstar Awards	2020	Best Pop Tour	When We All Fall Asleep Tour	Nominated	
Pollstar Awards	2021	Best Livestream Event/Virtual Festival	Where Do We Go?	Nominated	
Pollstar Awards	2023	Pop Tour of the Year	Happier Than Ever, The World Tour	Won	
Pollstar Awards	2025	Pop Tour of the Year	Hit Me Hard and Soft: The Tour	Won	
Pollstar Awards	2026	Pop Tour of the Year	Hit Me Hard and Soft: The Tour	Nominated	
Pollstar Awards	2026	Major Tour of the Year	Hit Me Hard and Soft: The Tour	Nominated	
Premios MUSA	2021	Anglo International Artist of the Year	Billie Eilish	Nominated	
Premios MUSA	2024	Anglo International Artist of the Year	Billie Eilish	Nominated	
Premios MUSA	2024	Anglo International Song of the Year	"Birds of a Feather"	Nominated	
Premios MUSA	2024	International Collaboration of the Year	"Guess featuring Billie Eilish"	Nominated	
Premios Odeón	2022	Best International Album	Happier Than Ever	Nominated	
Q Awards	2019	Best Solo Artist	Billie Eilish	Nominated	
Q Awards	2019	Best Act in the World Today	Billie Eilish	Nominated	
Q Awards	2019	Best Track	"Bad Guy"	Nominated	
Q Awards	2019	Best Album	When We All Fall Asleep, Where Do We Go?	Nominated	
Queerty Awards	2020	Anthem	"Bad Guy"	Nominated	
REGGIE Awards	2022	Experiential Marketing (Live Events or Installations)	Happier Than Ever: The Destination	Silver	
Rockbjörnen	2019	Foreign Song of the Year	"Bad Guy"	Nominated	
RTHK International Pop Poll Awards	2020	Top Ten International Gold Songs	"Bad Guy"	Won	
RTHK International Pop Poll Awards	2020	Super Gold Song	"Bad Guy"	Won	
RTHK International Pop Poll Awards	2020	Top Female Artist	Billie Eilish	Gold	
RTHK International Pop Poll Awards	2021	Top Female Artist	Billie Eilish	Bronze	
RTHK International Pop Poll Awards	2021	Top Ten International Gold Songs	"No Time to Die"	Won	
RTHK International Pop Poll Awards	2021	Top Ten International Gold Songs	"Therefore I Am"	Nominated	
RTHK International Pop Poll Awards	2022	Top Ten International Gold Songs	"Happier Than Ever"	Nominated	
RTHK International Pop Poll Awards	2022	Top Female Artist	Billie Eilish	Nominated	
RTHK International Pop Poll Awards	2023	Top Female Artist	Billie Eilish	Nominated	
RTHK International Pop Poll Awards	2023	Top Ten International Gold Songs	"What Was I Made For?"	Nominated	
Rolling Stone's International Music Awards	2019	Beginner	Billie Eilish	Won	
Sacem Grand Prizes	2020	International Work of the Year	Billie Eilish & Finneas	Won	
Saison Card Tokio Hot 100 Awards	2023	Best International Performance of the Year	Billie Eilish	Won	
Santa Barbara International Film Festival	2024	Variety's Artisans Award	"What Was I Made For?"	Won	
Satellite Awards	2022	Best Original Song	"No Time to Die"	Nominated	
Satellite Awards	2024	Best Original Song	"What Was I Made For?"	Won	
Scentbird Digital Fragrance Awards	2024	Top New Launch of the Year - Popular	Eilish No. 3 Eau de Parfum	Won	
Society of Composers & Lyricists Awards	2022	Outstanding Original Song for a Dramatic or Documentary Visual Media Production	"No Time to Die"	Won	
Society of Composers & Lyricists Awards	2024	Outstanding Original Song for a Comedy or Musical Visual Media Production	"What Was I Made For?"	Won	
Space Shower Music Awards	2019	Best International Artist	Billie Eilish	Won	
Spotify Awards	2019	Most-Streamed Female Artist	Billie Eilish	Nominated	
Spotify Awards	2019	Most-Streamed Female Artist on Consoles	Billie Eilish	Nominated	
Spotify Awards	2019	Most-Streamed Female Artist – For Users From 13 to 17 Years Old	Billie Eilish	Won	
Spotify Awards	2019	Most-Streamed Female Artist – For Users From 18 to 29 Years Old	Billie Eilish	Nominated	
Support + Feed's Fall Fundraiser Event	2023	Inspiration Award	Billie Eilish	Won	
Swiss Music Awards	2019	Best International Solo Act	Billie Eilish	Won	
Swiss Music Awards	2019	Best International Breaking Act	Billie Eilish	Won	
Swiss Music Awards	2025	Best International Solo Act	Billie Eilish	Won	
TEC Awards	2019	Outstanding Creative Achievement – Record Production/Single or Track	"Bad Guy"	Won	
TEC Awards	2022	Outstanding Creative Achievement – Record Production/Single or Track	"Lost Cause"	Won	
Teen Choice Awards	2019	Choice Song: Female Artist	"Bad Guy"	Nominated	
Teen Choice Awards	2019	Choice Female Artist	Billie Eilish	Won	
Teen Choice Awards	2019	Choice Breakout Artist	Billie Eilish	Won	
Teen Choice Awards	2019	Choice Summer Tour	When We All Fall Asleep Tour	Nominated	
Telehit Awards	2019	Best Anglo Video	"Bad Guy"	Won	
Telehit Awards	2019	Best Anglo Song	"Bad Guy"	Won	
Telehit Awards	2019	People's Best Video	"Bad Guy"	Nominated	
Telehit Awards	2019	Best Solo Female Act	Billie Eilish	Won	
The O2	2022	Sustainable First-time Award	Billie Eilish	Won	
The One Show Awards	2022	Craft / Art Direction	Billie Eilish x Beat Saber	Bronze	
The One Show Awards	2022	Brand-Side Initiated & Originated Project	Billie Eilish x Beat Saber	Merit	
The One Show Awards	2022	Brand Partnerships	Billie Eilish x Beat Saber	Merit	
Ticketmaster Awards (Germany)	2023	International Live Act of the Year	Billie Eilish	Nominated	
Ticketmaster Awards (Germany)	2026	International Live Act of the Year	Billie Eilish	Nominated	
Ticketmaster Awards (Ireland)	2026	Arena Show of the Year	Hit Me Hard and Soft: The Tour	Nominated	
Ticketmaster Awards (Italy)	2026	Best Production Design	Hit Me Hard and Soft: The Tour	Nominated	
Ticketmaster Awards (Italy)	2026	Best International Artist	Billie Eilish	Nominated	
Ticketmaster Awards (Italy)	2026	Best Fanbase	Billie Eilish	Nominated	
Ticketmaster Awards (Netherlands)	2023	International Live Act of the Year	Billie Eilish	Nominated	
Ticketmaster Awards (Netherlands)	2026	Best Fanbase	Billie Eilish	Won	
Ticketmaster Awards (Norway)	2026	International Live Act of the Year	Billie Eilish	Nominated	
Ticketmaster Awards (Poland)	2026	Best Concert of the Year (Pop/Dance)	Hit Me Hard and Soft: The Tour	Won	
Ticketmaster Awards (Spain)	2026	International Live Act of the Year	Billie Eilish	Nominated	
Ticketmaster Awards (Spain)	2026	Best Tour of the Year	Hit Me Hard and Soft: The Tour	Nominated	
Ticketmaster Awards (Switzerland)	2023	Entertainment (2nd)	Billie Eilish	Won	
Ticketmaster Awards (United Kingdom)	2023	International Live Act of the Year	Billie Eilish	Nominated	
UK Music Video Awards	2019	Best Pop Video – International	"When the Party's Over"	Nominated	
UK Music Video Awards	2024	Best Dance/Electronic Video – UK	"Guess featuring Billie Eilish"	Nominated	
UK Music Video Awards	2024	Best Production Design in a Video	"Guess featuring Billie Eilish"	Nominated	
Universal Music Group x REVERB	2023	Amplifier Award	Billie Eilish	Won	
Variety Hitmakers Awards	2019	Hitmaker of the Year	Billie Eilish	Won	
Variety Hitmakers Awards	2021	Film Song of the Year	"No Time to Die"	Won	
Variety Hitmakers Awards	2023	Film Song of the Year	"What Was I Made For?"	Won	
Variety's Power of Women Awards	2023	Power of Women	Billie Eilish	Won	
Volume Awards	2018	Most Hyped New Artist	Billie Eilish	Won	
Webby Awards	2022	Trailer (Video)	Meta Quest [fka Oculus] - Billie Eilish x Beat Saber	Won	
Webby Awards	2022	Media & Entertainment (Branded) (Video)	Meta Quest [fka Oculus] - Billie Eilish x Beat Saber	Nominated	
Webby Awards	2023	General Video - Comedy (Video)	The Simpsons - When Billie Met Lisa	Nominated	
World Soundtrack Awards	2022	Best Original Song	"No Time to Die"	Won	
World Soundtrack Awards	2024	Best Original Song	"What Was I Made For?"	Won	
Worldwide Radio Summit Industry Awards	2020	Major Artist of the Year	Billie Eilish	Won	
Wowie Awards	2020	Outstanding Songwriter	"No Time to Die"	Nominated	
Wowie Awards	2022	Best Documentary	Billie Eilish: The World's a Little Blurry	Nominated	
WSJ. Innovator Awards	2025	Music Innovator	Billie Eilish	Won	
Žebřík Music Awards	2022	Best International Singer	Billie Eilish	2nd Place	
Žebřík Music Awards	2022	Best International Video Clip	Happier Than Ever	2nd Place	
Žebřík Music Awards	2022	Best International Composition	Happier Than Ever	3rd Place	
Žebřík Music Awards	2024	Best International Female Singer	Billie Eilish	1st Place	
Žebřík Music Awards	2024	Best International Composition	"What Was I Made For?"	3rd Place	
Žebřík Music Awards	2024	Best International Video Clip	"What Was I Made For?"	2nd Place	

== Other accolades ==
=== Guinness World Records ===
As of April 2024, Eilish has acquired 19 Guinness World Records.

Key
†	Indicates a former world-record holder

Name of publication, year the record was awarded, name of the record, and the name of the record holder
Publication	Year	World record	Record holder	R. Status	Ref.
Guinness World Records	2019	Youngest female artist at No.1 on UK albums chart	Billie Eilish	Record	
Guinness World Records	2019	Most simultaneous US Hot 100 entries by a female	Billie Eilish	Eliminated	
Guinness World Records	2019	Youngest artist to win Billboard's Women of the Year	Billie Eilish	Record	
Guinness World Records	2019	Youngest artist to be nominated in all four Grammy Award general field categories	Billie Eilish	Record	
Guinness World Records	2019	Most streams on Spotify in one year (female)	Billie Eilish	Record	
Guinness World Records	2020	Youngest Album of the Year winner at the Grammy Awards	Billie Eilish	Record	
Guinness World Records	2020	Youngest Record of the Year winner at the Grammy Awards	Billie Eilish	Record	
Guinness World Records	2020	Youngest artist to win all four Grammy Award general field categories	Billie Eilish	Record	
Guinness World Records	2020	Youngest solo artist to win Album of the Year at the Grammy Awards	Billie Eilish	Record	
Guinness World Records	2020	First female artist to win all four Grammy Award general field categories at a single ceremony	Billie Eilish	Record	
Guinness World Records	2020	Youngest musician to write and record a James Bond theme song	Billie Eilish	Record	
Guinness World Records	2021	† Most consecutive Record of the Year awards won at the Grammys	Billie Eilish	Record	
Guinness World Records	2021	Most viewed Wikipedia page for a “post-millennial” (“Generation Z”)	Billie Eilish	Record	
Guinness World Records	2021	Most pre-added album on Apple Music	Happier Than Ever	Record	
Guinness World Records	2021	† Most consecutive Grammy nominations for Record of the Year (female)	Billie Eilish	Record	
Guinness World Records	2021	† Most consecutive Grammy nominations for Song of the Year	Billie Eilish	Record	
Guinness World Records	2022	Youngest winner of Best International Artist of the Year at the BRIT Awards	Billie Eilish	Record	
Guinness World Records	2022	Youngest person to win the film music awards “triple crown”	Billie Eilish	Record	
Guinness World Records	2024	† Most Grammys won for Song of the Year	Billie Eilish	Record	
Guinness World Records	2024	Youngest double Oscar winner	Billie Eilish	Record	
