= Jason Kramer =

American radio personality

Jason Kramer is a music supervisor and American radio personality. He is best known for his weekly radio show on Santa Monica, California-based, freeform public radio station KCRW (89.9 MHz FM).

== Early life and radio ==
Born and raised in Los Angeles, California, Kramer worked as an EMT during the late 80s and early 90s; and through the 1992 Los Angeles riots. Soon after he began pursuing a career in radio, first cutting his teeth as a call screener at KLOS (95.5 MHz FM). In 1994, he spent much of his time working with Skunk Records and ska punk band Sublime, promoting their records for radio play and conducting surveys among college and commercial radio stations. In 1996, he moved on to become the music supervisor for Fox Sports Net during which time he was part of a team selecting music for sports programming. After six years, Kramer was promoted to co-producer and board engineer for Fox Sports Radio, producing programs such as the Adam Schein Show and Race Day on Fox. He also programmed, produced, and hosting his own five-hour weekly internet radio show on Soundbreak.com. In 1997, he began working on-air at KCRW where he currently hosts his own weekly show on Tuesday nights.

== Music Supervision and other pursuits ==
In 2010 Kramer joined Santa Monica-based music agency, Elias Arts as their commercial concept music supervisor working with such brands as: Kia, Pepsi, Lexus, Toyota, and many others. He also interviewed and photographed numerous artists that he brought into the Elias studios for showcases and recording sessions.

Kramer continues to work in various aspects of music including management, publishing, creative consulting, and music photography. He speaks frequently at industry events for organizations such as ASCAP and SESAC, and has appeared on the internet TV show 'The Weekly Comet' as a segment producer and "Pick of the Week" host. He has produced live performances in Los Angeles at venues such as Hotel Café and Echo for such artists as Liam Bailey, Barry Adamson, L.A. Guns, and Jimmy Scott.

== Teaching ==
In the fall of 2013, Kramer began teaching a course on music supervision as part of UCLA Extension.

== Awards and Accolades ==
In 2014, Kramer won the Guild of Music Supervisors Award for Best Music Supervision in Advertising. The award was presented at the 4th annual award ceremony held at Mack Sennett Studios in Hollywood on January 28, 2014.

Kramer's work on a national advertising spot for Target (entitled 'Sunrise'), featuring the Kishi Bashi song “Philosophize In It! Chemicalize with It!”, was recognized as a Top 10 Fall 2014 Music Track by SHOOTonline.
