= Transmission (Low EP) =

Transmission EP

EP by Low
- Released: January 23 1996
- Genres: Indie rock, slowcore
- Length: 20:46; 35:32 (including hidden track)
- Label: Vernon Yard
- Producers: Steve Albini, Kramer

Low chronology
Long Division (1995)	Transmission EP (1996)	The Curtain Hits the Cast (1996)

Professional ratings
Review scores
Source	Rating
Allmusic	4/5 stars

Transmission is an EP by the American slowcore band Low, released in 1996 on Vernon Yard. The title track is a cover of "Transmission" by Joy Division.

== Track listing ==
All tracks are written by Alan Sparhawk and Mimi Parker, except where noted.

No.	Title	Writer(s)	Length
1.	"Transmission"	Joy Division	6:14
2.	"Bright"		3:55
3.	"Caroline 2"		4:41
4.	"Hands"		4:30
5.	"Jack Smith"	Supreme Dicks	1:24
6.	"[untitled] (Note: Track 6 comprises 5:04 of silence followed by a hidden track lasting 9:45.)"		14:49
Total length:			35:33

== Extra links ==
- Transmission EP at Discogs
