= A Lifetime of Temporary Relief: 10 Years of B-Sides and Rarities =

Box set by Low
- Released: July 20, 2004
- Recorded: 1994–2004
- Genre: Indie rock, Slowcore
- Length: 332:50
- Label: Chairkickers' Union, Rough Trade (UK)
- Producer: Various

Low chronology
Trust (2002)	A Lifetime of Temporary Relief: 10 Years of B-Sides and Rarities (2004)	The Great Destroyer (2005)

Professional ratings
Aggregate scores
Source	Rating
Metacritic	80/100
Review scores
Source	Rating
AllMusic	4/5 stars
The Austin Chronicle	4/5 stars
Blender	3.5/5 stars
E!	B−
Mojo	4/5 stars
NME	6/10
Pitchfork	6.8/10
Q	4/5 stars
Stylus	9/10
Uncut	8/10

A Lifetime of Temporary Relief is a box set by Duluth, Minnesota group Low, released in 2004. The set includes a two-sided DVD containing documentaries, videos and live tracks.

== Track listing ==
CDs

All tracks are written by Low, except where noted.

Disc 1
No.	Title	Writer(s)	Length
1.	"Lullaby" (Demo)		10:06
2.	"Cut" (Demo)		5:41
3.	"Heartbeat"	Colin Newman	4:08
4.	"Peanut Butter Toast and American Bandstand" (From the compilation When I'm Hungry I Eat)		2:23
5.	"Tired" (From the EP Low, only released in Australia)		5:11
6.	"I Started a Joke" (From the compilation Jabberjaw... Pure Sweet Hell)	Bee Gees	4:28
7.	"The Plan" (Demo)		2:50
8.	"Prisoner" (Demo)		6:10
9.	"Prisoner" (From the EP Finally... and the vinyl edition of The Curtain Hits the Cast)		3:48
10.	"Tomorrow One" (From the EP Finally... and the vinyl edition of The Curtain Hits the Cast)		4:29
11.	"Turning Over" (From the EP Finally...)		7:49
12.	"Bright" (Demo)		1:45
13.	"Walk You Out"		4:46
14.	"Tear Down"		4:48
15.	"Standby" (From The Curtain Hits the Cast)		5:11
16.	"David & Jude" (Released on a split single with Vibracathedral Orchestra)		1:22
17.	"Cheek" (From a compilation released by The Duplex Planet)		3:24

Disc 2
No.	Title	Writer(s)	Length
1.	"Venus" (Released as a single in 1997)		3:44
2.	"Boyfriends & Girlfriends" (B-side to "Venus")		6:06
3.	"Surf" (From the compilation Music For Film & Television #3)		2:31
4.	"No Need" (Version 1; released on a split single with Dirty Three)		5:03
5.	"Be There" (Version 1; B-side to "Over The Ocean")		8:28
6.	"Lift" (From the 7" compilation The Paper 7")		5:45
7.	"Joan of Arc" (Released as a single in 1998)		3:21
8.	"Long Long Long" (B-side to "Joan of Arc")	George Harrison	3:50
9.	"Lion/Lamb" (Demo)		3:50
10.	"Will the Night" (Demo)		2:47
11.	"Last Breath" (From the vinyl and Japanese edition of Secret Name)		4:47
12.	"Joan of Arc" (20 Below Mix)		3:25
13.	"Old Man Song" (From the vinyl and Japanese edition of Secret Name)		3:48
14.	"Try Try Try" (From the Japanese edition of Secret Name)		0:37
15.	"Lord, Can You Hear Me?" (From the compilation A Tribute To Spacemen 3)	Jason Pierce	6:24
16.	"Venus" (Time Stereo Dub Mix; released on a split single with K.)		3:51
17.	"Those Girls (Song for Nico)" (Released on a split single with K.)		3:06
18.	Untitled		2:50
19.	"Words" (In Misfits Style)		2:50
20.	"Turn" (In Misfits Style)		1:03
21.	"Over The Ocean" (In Misfits Style)		1:36

Tracks 18 to 21 are unlisted on all packaging material.

Disc 3
No.	Title	Writer(s)	Length
1.	"I Remember" (Single Version; B-side to "Immune")		3:22
2.	"Kindly Blessed" (From the compilation The Unaccompanied Voice)		2:17
3.	"Blue-Eyed Devil" (From the compilation Teleconned Vol. 1: We Want The Airwaves)	Mike Doughty	5:02
4.	"Sleep At The Bottom" (Released on a split single with Piano Magic & Transient Waves)		4:54
5.	"When You Walked" (From the compilation Shanti Project Collection 2; originally titled "When You Walked Out on Me")		3:55
6.	"Back Home Again" (From the compilation Take Me Home: A Tribute To John Denver)	John Denver	5:20
7.	"Don't Drop the Baby"		4:02
8.	"Surfer Girl" (Live)	Brian Wilson	3:35
9.	"Blowin' in the Wind"	Bob Dylan	3:49
10.	"Open Arms"	Steve Perry & Jonathan Cain	4:02
11.	"...I Love"	Tom T. Hall	2:45
12.	"Carnival Queen" (From the compilation Naked In The Afternoon: A Tribute To Jandek)	Jandek	5:13
13.	"Overhead" (From the single "Dinosaur Act" and Japanese edition of Things We Lost in the Fire)		4:33
14.	"Don't Carry It All" (From the single "Dinosaur Act" and Japanese edition of Things We Lost in the Fire)		4:13
15.	"Last Night I Dreamt That Somebody Loved Me" (Released as a single in 2001)	Morrissey & Johnny Marr	3:58
16.	"Because You Stood Still" (B-side to "Last Night I Dreamt That Somebody Loved Me")		5:33
17.	"Fearless" (B-side to "Canada")	Roger Waters & David Gilmour	6:20
18.	"Shots & Ladders 2" (B-side to "Canada")		6:47

DVD

Side 1: Videos and Performances
No.	Title	Length
1.	"Words"	5:46
2.	"Shame"	4:08
3.	"Over the Ocean"	3:50
4.	"Looking Out For Hope" (Listed as "Hope")	11:28
5.	"Will the Night"	3:07
6.	"Weight of Water"	4:21
7.	"Don't Understand"	6:56
8.	"Immune"	3:31
9.	"Home"	2:25
10.	"Dinosaur Act"	4:07
11.	"Canada"	3:49
12.	"Over the Ocean" (Oosterschelde Version)	5:03
13.	"Canada"	15:42
14.	"Two Step" (Live at Bard College)	6:11
15.	"Soon" (Live at Coolidge Corner)	7:38
16.	"I Remember" (Live in Paris)	5:40

Videos 12 to 16 can only be accessed through hidden selection options from the DVD menu.

Side 2: Documentaries; directed by Marc Gartman
No.	Title	Length
1.	"Closer Than That"	1:06:11
2.	"In The Fishtank"	16:50
3.	"The Making of Trust"	17:34
