= Finally... (EP) =

Finally

EP by Low
- Released: May 1996
- Genres: Indie rock, Slowcore
- Length: 20:23
- Label: Vernon Yard Recordings
- Producer: Steve Fisk

Low chronology
Low (1994)	Finally (1996)	Over the Ocean (1996)

Finally... is an EP by Duluth, Minnesota slowcore group Low, released in May 1996.

== Track listing ==
No.	Title	Length
1.	"Anon"	4:20
2.	"Tomorrow One"	4:29
3.	"Prisoner"	3:48
4.	"Turning Over"	7:46
Total length:		20:23

Track one is originally from The Curtain Hits the Cast. Tracks two and three are originally from the vinyl version of the aforementioned album. Track four is previously unreleased. Tracks two, three, and four can be found on A Lifetime of Temporary Relief: 10 Years of B-Sides and Rarities.
