= Breathing and Not Breathing =

Compilation album by Supreme Dicks
- Released: October 18, 2011
- Length: 250:59
- Label: Jagjaguwar

Supreme Dicks chronology
This Is Not a Dick (1996)	Breathing and Not Breathing (2011)

Professional ratings
Review scores
Source	Rating
AllMusic	4.5/5 stars

Breathing and Not Breathing is a compilation album by experimental indie rock group Supreme Dicks, released October 18, 2011. The album comprises the band's previous albums in chronological order, as well as five previously unreleased songs, listed as the last five songs on disc 4.

== Track listing ==
=== Disc 1 - The Unexamined Life ===
1. "In a Sweet Song" – 4:33
2. "The Arabian Song" - 4:33
3. "The Sun's Bells" - 5:37
4. "Jack Smith" - 3:41
5. "That I May Never Forget and Stay" - 2:27
6. "Garden of Your Past" - 2:42
7. "Jack-O-Lantern" - 3:27
8. "River Song" - 3:33
9. "The Fallout Song" - 4:20
10. "Azure Dome" - 5:04
11. "The Forest Song (Or Especially When The October Wind With Frosty Fingers, Punishes My Hair)" - 5:28
12. "Hyacinth Girls" - 2:20
13. "Ten Past Eleven" - 4:24
14. "Woody Would've Wanted It That Way" - 2:17
15. "Strange Song" - 9:45

=== Disc 2 - Working Man's Dick ===
1. "Ranada's Demon" - 3:08
2. "The Language You Learnt" - 3:33
3. "All That Returns" - 3:27
4. "In the Whippoorwill's Sad Orchard" - 2:54
5. "Blue Elephant" - 3:10
6. "The Pear Thripe" - 5:57
7. "Flaming Day of the Locusts" - 5:35
8. "Andy Herman Song" - 3:44
9. "For Now" - 2:15
10. "Descension Song" - 5:20
11. "The Pusher" - 1:28
12. "Hyacinth Girls" - 2:32
13. "Arise! Life Giving Seagull" - 1:40
14. "Talking Moby Dick Blues" - 3:37
15. "Shroud-Like Remains" - 2:59
16. "The Baal Shem" - 4:20
17. "The Searcher" - 2:30
18. "Night at the Opera" - 0:54
19. "Chateaux Banana!, Pts. 13-16" - 6:56
20. "Viva la Speedy Orgone" - 1:45

=== Disc 3 - The Emotional Plague ===
1. "Synaesthesia" - 4:56
2. "Cúchulain (Blackbirds Loom)" - 3:33
3. "Columnated Ruins/Seeing Distant Chimneys" - 6:29
4. "Along a Bearded Glade" - 2:19
5. "Swell Song" - 4:10
6. "Showered" - 5:27
7. "A Donkey's Burial in a Tower on a Mirage" - 9:46
8. "Adoration de l'Agneau Mystique" - 7:24
9. "Porridge for the Calydonian Boar" - 9:44
10. "Siberian Penal Colony (Ode to Joel Stanley)" - 8:01
11. "Green Wings Fly Adventure (Showered Reprise)" - 7:19

=== Disc 4 - This Is Not a Dick & Rarities ===
1. "Listen Now! Invasion from Mars" - 2:39
2. "[Untitled]" - 7:20
3. "Summertime (Childhood's Impossible Now)" - 4:26
4. "The Hunchback" - 3:46
5. "Mark's Phonecall from Orgoneland" - 4:10
6. "Listen Now! Leaning on the Everlasting Arm" - 2:07
7. "Harmonic Convergence" - 2:55
8. "Last Jam" - 2:15
9. "Country of Nuns" - 4:49
10. "Sky Puddle" - 4:16
11. "Huckleberry Fetal Pain" - 2:24
12. "Cows of Light" - 3:50
13. "Careful with That Axe, Steve" - 4:59
