= Songs for a Dead Pilot =

EP by Low
- Released: November 20, 1997
- Genres: Indie rock; Slowcore
- Length: 35:51
- Label: Kranky

Low chronology
The Curtain Hits the Cast (1996)	Songs for a Dead Pilot (1997)	Secret Name (1999)

Professional ratings
Review scores
Source	Rating
Allmusic	2.5/5 stars

Songs for a Dead Pilot is an EP by American slowcore group Low, released by Kranky on November 20, 1997. It was their first release on the label, and is widely viewed as their most minimalistic recording. The title is a reference to a story the band had read about a crashed plane and its pilot. No credit is given for the cover artwork in the liner notes.

"Will the Night" is an early, ambient version of the song which later appeared in a fuller form on Secret Name.

A recording of a concert on the late 1997 tour for this release was released as the live album, One More Reason to Forget.

== Track listing ==
All songs written by Low.

No.	Title	Lead vocals	Length
1.	"Will the Night"	Alan Sparhawk	3:06
2.	"Condescend"	Mimi J. Parker	5:10
3.	"Born by the Wires"	Sparhawk	13:26
4.	"Be There"	Sparhawk, Parker	4:42
5.	"Landlord"	Sparhawk	6:47
6.	"Hey Chicago"	Sparhawk, Parker	2:40
Total length:			35:51

== Personnel ==
- Alan Sparhawk - vocals, guitar, keyboards
- Mimi Parker - percussion, vocals
- Zak Sally - bass guitar
- The Flag Day Strings
  - Jaron Childs - cello
  - Cassandra Legge - cello
  - Tresa Ellickson - viola
- Chris Freeman - keyboards on "Hey Chicago"
- Bethany Legge - baby on "Condescend"
