= Christmas (Low EP) =

EP by Low
- Released: November 16th 1999
- Genre: Indie rock, slowcore
- Length: 29:45
- Language: English
- Label: Kranky

Low chronology
Secret Name (1999)	Christmas (1999)	Bombscare EP (2000)

Professional ratings
Review scores
Source	Rating
AllMusic	4/5 stars
The Encyclopedia of Popular Music	4/5 stars
NME	9/10
PopMatters	8/10

Christmas is an EP by the indie rock band Low. It was released in 1999 on Kranky. A Christmas album, it was released as a gift to fans. In 2013, the A.V. Club's Josh Modell described it as "the religious album even heathens can love".

"If You Were Born Today" and "Blue Christmas" was released as a single in 1997.

== Track listing ==
All tracks are written by Alan Sparhawk, Mimi Parker and Zak Sally except where noted

No.	Title	Writer(s)	Length
1.	"Just Like Christmas"		3:08
2.	"Long Way Around the Sea"		4:38
3.	"The Little Drummer Boy"	Harry Simeone, Henry Onorati, Katherine Davis	4:52
4.	"If You Were Born Today (Song for Little Baby Jesus)"		4:50
5.	"Blue Christmas"	Billy Hayes, Jay Johnson	3:22
6.	"Silent Night"	Franz Gruber, Joseph Mohr	4:23
7.	"Taking Down the Tree"		2:44
8.	"One Special Gift"		1:48

== "If You Were Born Today (Song For Little Baby Jesus)" ==
"If You Were Born Today (Song For Little Baby Jesus)"

Single by Low
- Released: 1997
- Genre: Indie rock
- Label: Wurlitzer Jukebox
- Songwriter(s): Alan Sparhawk

Low singles chronology
"'Transmission (EP)'" (1996)	"If You Were Born Today (Song For Little Baby Jesus)" (1997)	"'Songs for a Dead Pilot'" (1997)

"If You Were Born Today (Song For Little Baby Jesus)" was released as a 7-inch single from the EP with "Blue Christmas" as a B-side.

No.	Title	Length
1.	"If You Were Born Today" (Song For Little Baby Jesus)
2.	"Blue Christmas"
