= C'mon (Low album) =

Studio album by Low
- Released: April 12, 2011
- Recorded: 2010, at Sacred Heart Studio, Duluth, Minnesota. Additional recording and mixing at Handsome Central, Los Angeles, California. Mastered at Chicago Mastering.
- Genres: Dream pop, slowcore
- Length: 45:52
- Label: Sub Pop
- Producers: Low, Matt Beckley

Low chronology
Drums and Guns (2007)	C'mon (2011)	The Invisible Way (2013)

Professional ratings
Aggregate scores
Source	Rating
AnyDecentMusic?	7.7/10
Metacritic	80/100
Review scores
Source	Rating
AllMusic	4/5 stars
The A.V. Club	B
The Guardian	4/5 stars
The Independent	3/5 stars
The Irish Times	4/5 stars
The Observer	5/5 stars
Pitchfork	7.2/10
Q	4/5 stars
Spin	8/10
Uncut	4/5 stars

C'mon is the ninth studio album by American indie rock band Low. It was released on April 12, 2011 (April 11 in Europe) on Sub Pop records. The album was recorded at Sacred Heart Studio, a former Catholic church in Duluth, Minnesota, where the band previously recorded 2002's Trust. The album includes guest contributions from Nels Cline (lap steel, guitar), Caitlin Moe of Trans-Siberian Orchestra (violin) and Dave Carroll of Trampled by Turtles (banjo).

"Try to Sleep" and "Especially Me" were released by the band in advance of the album; "Try to Sleep" was made available through the band's mailing list in February 2011, while "Especially Me" was premiered on Pitchfork on March 25, 2011. A promotional video for "Try to Sleep" starring John Stamos and Melissa Haro and directed by Travis Schneider was released to coincide with the release of the album. A second promotional video for "Especially Me", directed by Phil Harder was released on August 18, 2011.

Uncut placed the album at number 33 on its list of "Top 50 albums of 2011".

In June 2017, the song "Especially Me" featured in season 5, episode 8 ("Tied to the Tracks") of Netflix's Orange Is the New Black.

== Track listing ==
All songs written by Mimi Parker and Alan Sparhawk

No.	Title	Length
1.	"Try to Sleep"	4:20
2.	"You See Everything"	4:08
3.	"Witches"	4:02
4.	"Done"	2:54
5.	"Especially Me"	5:30
6.	"$20"	4:12
7.	"Majesty/Magic"	4:14
8.	"Nightingale"	5:00
9.	"Nothing but Heart"	8:12
10.	"Something's Turning Over"	3:20

== Charts ==
Chart (2011)	Peak position
Belgium (Flanders) (Ultratop 50)	60
Ireland (IRMA)	55
UK Albums Chart (OCC)	49
UK Independent Albums Chart (OCC)	7
US Billboard 200	73

== Personnel ==
Low

- Steve Garrington – bass guitar, organ, piano, production
- Mimi Parker – percussion, vocals, composition, production
- Alan Sparhawk – guitar, vocals, percussion, composition, production

Additional personnel

- Matt Beckley – string arrangement, mastering, production, recording
- David Carroll – banjo
- Nels Cline – guitar, lap steel guitar
- Caitlin Moe – string arrangement, violin
- Chris Price – keyboards
- Brad Searles – cover photo
- Cyrus Sparhawk – backing vocals
- Hollis Sparhawk – backing vocals
- Ryland Steen – percussion
- Eric Swanson – recording
