= Long Division (Low album) =

Studio album by Low
- Released: May 23, 1995
- Recorded: 1994
- Genres: Slowcore; dream pop
- Length: 49:09
- Label: Vernon Yard
- Producer: Kramer

Low chronology
| I Could Live in Hope (1994) | Long Division (1995) | The Curtain Hits the Cast (1996) |

Professional ratings
Review scores
| Source | Rating |
|---|---|
| AllMusic | 4.5/5 stars |
| NME | 7/10 |
| Q | 4/5 stars |

Long Division is the second studio album by American indie rock band Low. It was released on May 23, 1995, on Vernon Yard Recordings.

== Track listing ==
All tracks are written by Low (Mimi Parker, Zak Sally and Alan Sparhawk).

| No. | Title | Lead vocals | Length |
|---|---|---|---|
| 1. | "Violence" | Sparhawk | 5:54 |
| 2. | "Below & Above" | Parker | 2:32 |
| 3. | "Shame" | Parker | 3:56 |
| 4. | "Throw Out the Line" | Sparhawk | 4:05 |
| 5. | "Swingin'" | Sparhawk | 4:10 |
| 6. | "See-through" | Parker | 4:25 |
| 7. | "Turn" | Sparhawk | 5:08 |
| 8. | "Caroline" | Sparhawk | 4:48 |
| 9. | "Alone" | Sparhawk | 4:00 |
| 10. | "Streetlight" | Sparhawk | 0:35 |
| 11. | "Stay" | Sparhawk | 7:04 |
| 12. | "Take" | Sparhawk | 2:32 |
| Total length: | | | 49:09 |
