= Paris '99: "Anthony, Are You Around?" =

Live album by Low
- Released: 2001
- Recorded: November 5, 1999
- Venues: La Maroquinerie, Paris
- Genres: Indie rock, slowcore
- Length: 77:37
- Label: P-Vine Records

Low chronology
Things We Lost in the Fire (2001)	Paris '99: "Anthony, Are You Around?" (2001)	In the Fishtank 7 (2001)

Professional ratings
Review scores
Source	Rating
AllMusic	3/5 stars
Pitchfork	(7.8/10)

Paris '99: "Anthony, Are You Around?" is a live album by the slowcore group Low, released in 2001. It was recorded live at La Maroquinerie, Paris, on November 5, 1999.

== Track listing ==
No.	Title	Length
1.	"Home"	3:43
2.	"Starfire"	3:26
3.	"No Need"	4:00
4.	"Weight of Water"	5:11
5.	"Immune"	3:48
6.	"Rope"	7:12
7.	"Two-Step"	6:26
8.	"Violence"	5:51
9.	"Blue Christmas"	4:08
10.	"Over the Ocean"	4:04
11.	"Hey Chicago"	2:41
12.	"Joan of Arc"	3:33
13.	"Soon"	8:03
14.	"I Remember"	5:57
15.	"Lazy"	6:06
16.	"Will the Night"	3:28
Total length:		77:37
