= I Could Live in Hope =

Studio album by Low
- Released: February 18, 1994
- Recorded: Autumn 1993
- Studio: Noise New Jersey
- Genre: Slowcore; dream pop
- Length: 56:17
- Label: Vernon Yard
- Producer: Kramer

Low chronology
I Could Live in Hope (1994)	Long Division (1995)

I Could Live in Hope is the debut studio album by American indie rock band Low. It was released on February 18, 1994, on Vernon Yard Recordings.

== Background and composition ==
"Lullaby"
A 29-second excerpt from "Lullaby". This song became one of Low's most famous tracks. The song, alongside the rest of I Could Live in Hope, helped pioneer the genre slowcore, which Pitchfork described as "stretch[ing] a simple melody into a 10-minute meditation that gently pulls [the listener] out of linear time".

A reaction to the abrasiveness of alternative rock in the early 1990s, when grunge had reigning popularity, Low "eschewed conventional songwriting in favour of mood and movement." Influenced by Brian Eno and Joy Division, the band, collaborating with long-time producer and New York underground mainstay Kramer, favored slow-paced compositions characterized by minimal instrumentation and an economy of language.

The band named the album after stopping for sandwiches in Hope Township, New Jersey.

== Reception ==
Professional ratings
Review scores
Source	Rating
AllMusic	4/5 stars
Chicago Tribune	3.5/4 stars
Mojo	4/5 stars
NME	7/10
Pitchfork	9.3/10
Q	4/5 stars
Uncut	8/10
Vox	6/10

I Could Live in Hope received generally positive reviews from contemporary music critics. Writing for the Chicago Tribune, Greg Kot felt that "its heavy-lidded drama creeps by in all-enveloping slow motion" and called it "the best record made for those dreary, nothing's-going-on-and-I-want-to-crawl-into-a-hole afternoons since Galaxie 500's debut", which was also produced by Kramer. Q critic Martin Aston remarked that "not since Galaxie 500's On Fire have rippling guitars and hammock swinging dynamics seemed so beatific, this beautiful and not at any time depressing".

== Legacy ==
Featuring music played at an "unprecedented pace in the then-flowering underground," I Could Live in Hope helped to birth the genre known as slowcore, which encompassed acts from Bedhead to Codeine throughout the 1990s.

Pitchfork placed I Could Live in Hope at number 49 on its 1999 list of the best albums of the 1990s. The same year, critic Ned Raggett ranked it at number 37 on his list of "The Top 136 or So Albums of the Nineties" for Freaky Trigger. In 2004, the album was included in Les Inrockuptibles' "50 Years of Rock'n'Roll" list. In 2018, Pitchfork placed it at number 22 on its list of the 30 best dream pop albums.

== Track listing ==
All tracks are written by Alan Sparhawk, Mimi Parker and John Nichols, except where noted.

I Could Live in Hope track listing
No.	Title	Lead vocals	Length
1.	"Words"	Sparhawk	5:45
2.	"Fear"	Sparhawk	2:12
3.	"Cut"	Sparhawk	5:43
4.	"Slide"	Parker	3:46
5.	"Lazy"	Sparhawk	5:35
6.	"Lullaby"	Parker	9:46
7.	"Sea"	Sparhawk, Parker	1:45
8.	"Down"	Sparhawk	7:24
9.	"Drag"	Sparhawk	5:11
10.	"Rope"	Sparhawk	6:11
11.	"Sunshine" (Jimmie Davis, Charles Mitchell)	Sparhawk, Parker	2:59
Total length:			56:17

== Personnel ==
Credits adapted from the liner notes of I Could Live in Hope.

Low

- Alan Sparhawk – guitar, vocals
- Mimi Parker – percussion, vocals
- John Nichols – bass

Production

- Kramer – production
- Steve Watson – assistant production

Design

- Low – artwork
- Gerree Small – inner sleeve photography
