= Bluetile Lounge =

Australian band

- Origin: Perth, Western Australia, Australia
- Genres: Slowcore, post-rock, indie rock, shoegaze
- Years active: 1991–1998, 2021–present
- Labels: Hobbledehoy Record Co., Summershine Records, Smells Like Records
- Members: Daniel Erickson; Howard Healy; Gabrielle Cotton; Alexander Stevens

Bluetile Lounge is an Australian slowcore band, formed in Perth, Western Australia in 1991. After releasing their debut full-length album, Lowercase, in 1995, Bluetile Lounge signed to the American independent label Smells Like Records, which released the band's second LP, Half-Cut, in 1998.

Attracting little attention in their home city, Bluetile Lounge gained a cult following overseas, partly due to acclaim from international acts such as Low and Sonic Youth. Since entering hiatus in 1998, Bluetile Lounge's profile continued to grow through websites such as Tumblr and Last.fm, and their two albums have been ranked among the best of the slowcore genre.

The band reformed in 2021. Following the addition of their back-catalog to streaming services that same year, both original LPs were reissued in 2022. In November 2025, the band announced a reunion show for April 2026, to be held at Melbourne's Brunswick Ballroom.

== History ==
Bluetile Lounge formed in Perth, Western Australia in 1991. One of the band's early songs, "Concrete/Tunnels", featured on a compilation tape released by Guy Blackman's Chapter Music label. Blackman went on to become Bluetile Lounge's first producer.

In 1995, Bluetile Lounge recorded their debut album, Lowercase, in a Masonic Hall in the port city of Fremantle, south of Perth. The band chose the recording location for its acoustics, giving the album a "big, roomy natural sound." Alan Sparhawk, frontman of American band Low, encouraged Jason Reynolds of Australia's Summershine Records to release the album. Sub Pop and Shock Records distributed Lowercase in the United States and Australia respectively. Andy Hazel of Double J said the album's songs "don’t so much begin and end as appear, glitter, linger and recede. At times brittle and delicately constructed, there is a muscularity and sense of purpose that lulls and stuns."

At the insistence of Sonic Youth, Bluetile Lounge played the Perth leg of the 1996 Summersault music festival.

In 1998, the band returned to the Fremantle Masonic Hall to record their sophomore LP, Half Cut. Sonic Youth's Steve Shelley released the album on his label Smells Like Records. Reviewing the album for CMJ New Music Monthly, Lois Maffeo praised the band's compositions and "crystalline" sound, as well as their ability to maintain a "clear mental union" while playing at a "glacial" pace.

Bluetile Lounge entered a 23-year hiatus in 1998. In 2017, in ranking Lowercase as the fifth best slowcore album, Anthony Carew of ThoughtCo called it "a five-song, 45-minute study in isolationism, in a persistent loneliness leaving one feeling utterly unmoored; unsurprising sentiments for a band from Perth, the world's most isolated major city".

== Reformation and reissues ==
In April 2021, Bluetile Lounge released a new demo track titled "Last Men" on Bandcamp. The band also announced plans on their Facebook page for a vinyl reissue of Lowercase, along with the release of additional new recordings. Adelaide-based Hobbledehoy Record Co. oversaw the addition of the Bluetile Lounge discography to streaming services in July 2021, and announced the vinyl reissues of both Lowercase and Half Cut in June 2022, with new artwork by band member Howard Healy.

On June 17 of 2022, the band announced via their Facebook page that a new single, titled Easterly, was available via streaming services. Their first live show in 28 years has been announced for April 2026, in Melbourne.

== Members ==
- Daniel Erickson – vocals, guitar, piano
- Howard Healy – vocals, guitar, bass
- Gabrielle Cotton – guitar, piano, vocals
- Alexander Stevens – percussion

== Discography ==
=== Albums ===
List of studio albums by Bluetile Lounge
Year	Album title	Release details
1995	Lowercase	Released: 1995; Label: Summershine Records; Format: CD
1998	Half Cut	Released: 1998; Label: Smells Like Records; Format: CD

=== Singles ===
List of singles by Bluetile Lounge
Year	Title	Release
2022	Easterly	Released: 2022; Label: Hobbledehoy Record Co.; Format: DL

=== Compilations ===
- 2002: Double Figures: Ten Years Of Chapter Music (Chapter Music) - track "Concrete/Tunnels"
