= The Great Destroyer =

Studio album by Low
- Released: January 25, 2005
- Recorded: May 3 – September 27, 2004
- Studios: Tarbox Road Studios, Cassadaga, New York, United States
- Genre: Slowcore
- Length: 52:48
- Label: Sub Pop
- Producers: Dave Fridmann; Low

Low chronology
Trust (2002)	The Great Destroyer (2005)	Drums and Guns (2007)

The Great Destroyer is the seventh studio album by American indie rock band Low. It was released on January 25, 2005, as their first recording on Sub Pop Records.

"California", a song about Sparhawk's mother, was released as the album's first single, backed with a demo of "Cue the Strings". A remix EP of "Monkey", entitled "Tonight the Monkeys Die", soon followed. Music videos were created for both.

The title of the album (as well as the song "Silver Rider") is taken from the story within the album art. Sparhawk describes "Cue the Strings" as a "shout-out" to the artists Roy Orbison, Orchestral Manoeuvres in the Dark and David Bowie.

== Critical reception ==
Professional ratings
Aggregate scores
Source	Rating
Metacritic	82/100
Review scores
Source	Rating
AllMusic	4/5 stars
Blender	4/5 stars
Entertainment Weekly	A−
The Guardian	4/5 stars
Mojo	4/5 stars
NME	8/10
Pitchfork	5.5/10
Q	3/5 stars
Rolling Stone	3.5/5 stars
Spin	A−

According to the review aggregator Metacritic, The Great Destroyer received "universal acclaim" based on a weighted average score of 82 out of 100 from 34 critic scores. The site named it the 46th-best reviewed album of 2005. The album was reviewed by publications and critics contributing to Metacritic's aggregated score.

== Track listing ==
All songs written by Alan Sparhawk, Mimi Parker and Zak Sally.

No.	Title	Length
1.	"Monkey"	4:19
2.	"California"	3:23
3.	"Everybody's Song"	3:55
4.	"Silver Rider"	5:03
5.	"Just Stand Back"	3:04
6.	"On the Edge Of"	3:49
7.	"Cue the Strings"	3:30
8.	"Step"	3:18
9.	"When I Go Deaf"	4:41
10.	"Broadway (So Many People)"	7:14
11.	"Pissing"	5:08
12.	"Death of a Salesman"	2:28
13.	"Walk into the Sea"	2:56
Total length:		52:48

== Personnel ==
Low

- Mimi Parker – percussion, vocals, production, mixing
- Zak Sally – bass guitar, production, mixing, painting, illustrations
- Alan Sparhawk – guitar, vocals, production, mixing

Additional personnel

- Gerry Beckley – backing vocals on "Everybody's Song"
- Greg Calbi – mastering at Sterling Sound
- Dave Fridmann – production, mixing, keyboards on "California", "Everybody's Song", "Step", and "Broadway (So Many People)"
- Tom Herbers – engineering
- Jeff Kleinsmith – layout
- Hollis Mae Sparhawk – vocals on "Step", photography

== Songs covered ==
1. "Monkey" – Robert Plant's Band of Joy – Released in 2010
2. "Silver Rider" – Robert Plant's Band of Joy – Released in 2010
3. "Everybody's Song" – Robert Plant with Suzi Dian's Saving Grace – Released in September 26, 2025

== Charts ==
Chart (2005)	Peak position
Belgian Albums (Ultratop Flanders)	67
French Albums (SNEP)	190
Irish Albums (IRMA)	30
UK Albums (Official Charts)	72
US Heatseekers Albums (Billboard)	13
US Independent Albums (Billboard)	19
