= Solo Guitar =

Solo Guitar may refer to:

- Solo Guitar (Derek Bailey album) an album by Derek Bailey recorded in 1971
- Solo Guitar (Ted Greene album) a 1977 debut album by Ted Greene
- Solo Guitar (Earl Klugh album), a 1989 studio album by Earl Klugh
- Solo Guitar (Alan Sparhawk album), a 2006 album
