= OwL Remix =

Remix album by Low
- Released: 1998
- Genres: IDM, Ambient
- Label: Vernon Yard Recordings

Low chronology
One More Reason To Forget (1998)	OwL Remix (1998)	Christmas (1999)

OwL Remix is a remix album by Duluth, Minnesota slowcore group Low, released in 1998. Alan Sparhawk has stated that the band did not have input into the creation of the album.

== Track listing ==
1. "Down (Porter Ricks Remix)" – 13:25
2. "Anon (Spore)" – 5:10
3. "Over The Ocean ('91 Party Dance Mix)" – 6:39
4. "Laugh (Vox-Reverse Tele)" – 5:44
5. "Anon (Pollen)" – 5:12
6. "Do You Know How To Waltz (Vert)" – 4:31
7. "Over The Ocean (Re-Remix Of Tranquility Bass '91 Party Dance Mix)" – 5:45
8. "Words (J + S Mix)" – 6:26
