= Things We Lost in the Fire (album) =

Studio album by Low
- Released: January 22, 2001
- Genres: Slowcore; dream pop
- Length: 53:15
- Label: Kranky
- Producer: Steve Albini

Low chronology
Secret Name (1999)	Things We Lost in the Fire (2001)	Paris '99: "Anthony, Are You Around?" (2001)

Singles from Things We Lost in the Fire
- 1. "Dinosaur Act" Released: 2000

Things We Lost in the Fire is the fifth studio album by American indie rock band Low. It was released on January 22, 2001, on Kranky.

== Recording ==
Things We Lost in the Fire was engineered by Steve Albini at Electrical Audio in Chicago.

== Editions ==
Some overseas editions of the album contain the additional tracks "Overhead" and "Don't Carry It All", which were B-sides of the "Dinosaur Act" single, and were also published later on the 2004 box set of rarities, A Lifetime of Temporary Relief: 10 Years of B-Sides and Rarities. These two tracks were also included on the vinyl LP release of the album. This is a three-sided album, with the fourth side containing the song lyrics etched into the vinyl. In the UK the album was released by Tugboat Records (catalogue number TUGLP 027).

== Critical reception ==
Professional ratings
Aggregate scores
Source	Rating
Metacritic	87/100
Review scores
Source	Rating
AllMusic	4.5/5 stars
Alternative Press	4/5
Chicago Sun-Times	3.5/4 stars
Entertainment Weekly	A−
The Guardian	4/5 stars
The List	4/5 stars
NME	9/10
Pitchfork	8.7/10
Spin	8/10
Tiny Mix Tapes	4.5/5 stars

Things We Lost in the Fire garnered a score of 87 out of 100 on review aggregate site Metacritic, indicating "universal acclaim". Online music magazine Pitchfork placed Things We Lost in the Fire at number 117 on its list of top 200 albums of the 2000s and number 14 on its list of the 30 best dream pop albums. Things We Lost in the Fire was listed on NME's "Darkest Albums Ever: 50 of the Best" at number 36. The album was ranked 93rd on The Guardian's 100 Best Albums of the 21st Century list, based on a 2019 poll of music writers.

In 2006, the album was performed live in its entirety as part of the All Tomorrow's Parties-curated Don't Look Back series.

== In popular culture ==
The title of the album was referenced by the Argentinian writer Mariana Enriquez, in her second short story collection Las cosas que perdimos en el fuego. Mariana has declared to be a fan of the Minnesota group.

== Track listing ==
No.	Title	Lead vocals	Length
1.	"Sunflower"	Alan Sparhawk	4:39
2.	"Whitetail"	Sparhawk	5:03
3.	"Dinosaur Act"	Sparhawk	4:13
4.	"Medicine Magazines"	Sparhawk, Mimi J. Parker	4:33
5.	"Laser Beam"	Parker	2:54
6.	"July"	Sparhawk (first part), Parker (second part)	5:35
7.	"Embrace"	Parker	5:37
8.	"Whore"	Sparhawk	4:23
9.	"Kind of Girl"	Sparhawk, Parker	3:30
10.	"Like a Forest"	Sparhawk, Parker	2:27
11.	"Closer"	Sparhawk	5:06
12.	"Untitled"	instrumental	0:46
13.	"In Metal"	Parker	4:19
