= Drums and Guns =

Studio album by Low
- Released: 20 March 2007
- Recorded: 2006
- Genres: Post-rock; indie electronic; ambient pop
- Length: 41:22
- Label: Sub Pop
- Producer: Dave Fridmann

Low chronology
The Great Destroyer (2005)	Drums and Guns (2007)	C'mon (2011)

Professional ratings
Aggregate scores
Source	Rating
Metacritic	81/100
Review scores
Source	Rating
AllMusic	4/5 stars
The A.V. Club	A−
Mojo	4/5 stars
NME	7/10
Pitchfork	8.1/10
PopMatters	8/10
Q	4/5 stars
Stylus	A−
Tiny Mix Tapes	4.5/5 stars
Uncut	4/5 stars

Drums and Guns is the eighth studio album by indie rock band Low. It is the second album they recorded with producer Dave Fridmann (The Great Destroyer). The album was partially inspired by the war in Iraq. It was released on March 20, 2007, on Sub Pop records.

Musician Steve Adey covered "Murderer" on his 2017 LP Do Me a Kindness.

== Track listing ==
No.	Title	Length
1.	"Pretty People"	3:01
2.	"Belarus"	3:17
3.	"Breaker"	2:53
4.	"Dragonfly"	3:44
5.	"Sandinista"	2:22
6.	"Always Fade"	3:57
7.	"Dust on the Window"	4:12
8.	"Hatchet"	2:18
9.	"Your Poison"	1:13
10.	"Take Your Time"	4:18
11.	"In Silence"	2:46
12.	"Murderer"	3:43
13.	"Violent Past"	3:38
Total length:		41:22

== Charts ==
Charts (2007)	Peak position
Belgium (Flanders) (Ultratop 50)	60
Ireland (IRMA)	54
Italy (FIMI)	68
United States Billboard 200	196
Billboard Top Heatseekers	8
Billboard Top Independent Albums	26
