= Low (band) =

American indie rock group (1993–2022)

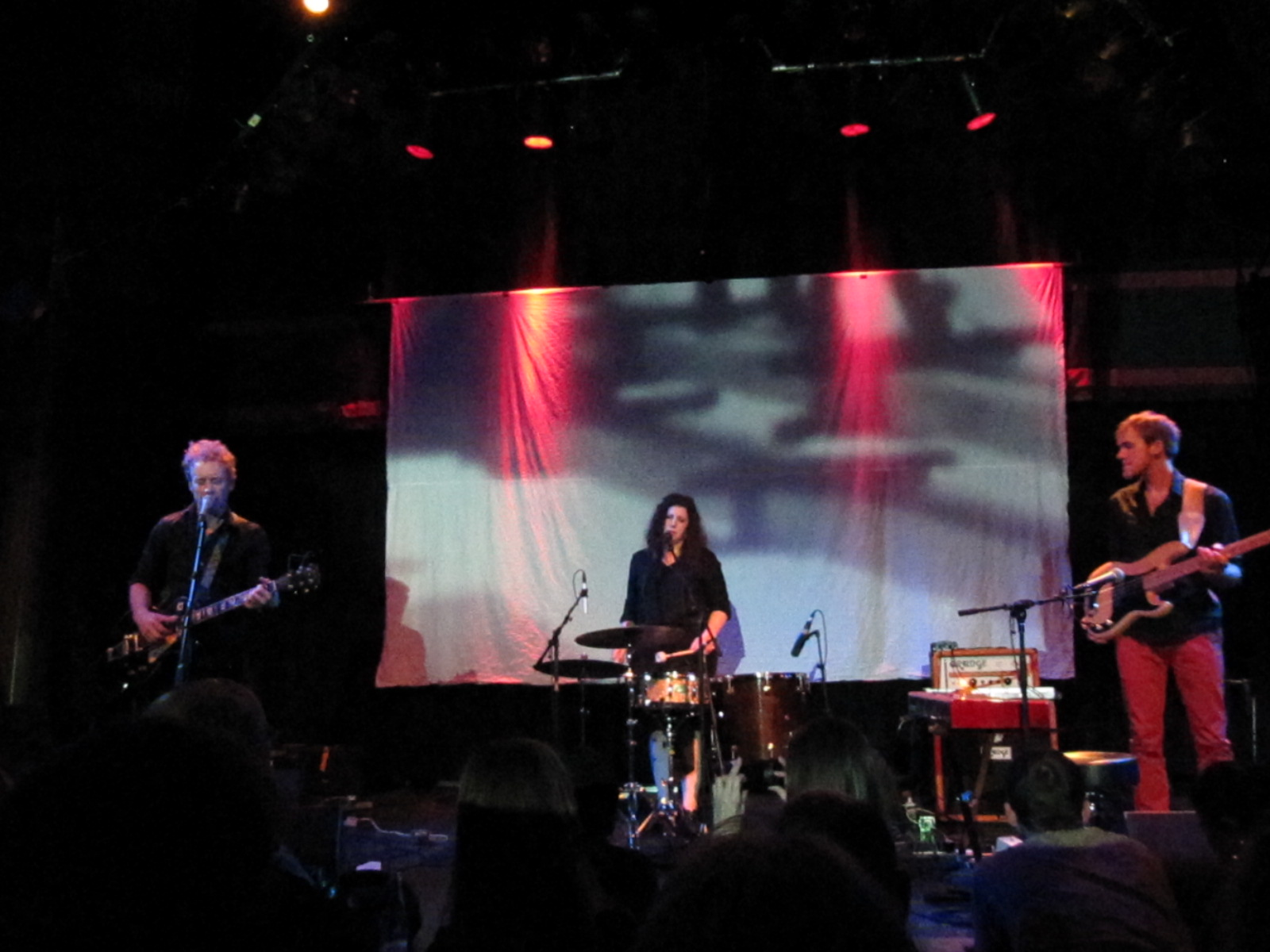
- Low in 2013

Background information
- Origin: Duluth, Minnesota, U.S.
- Genres: Indie rock; slowcore; dream pop
- Years active: 1993–2022
- Labels: Vernon Yard; Kranky; P-Vine; Sub Pop; Rocket Girl
- Spinoffs: Black Eyed Snakes; The Hospital People; The Tooth Fairies; The Murder of Crows; Tired Eyes; Derecho; Damien
- Past members: Alan Sparhawk; Mimi Parker; John Nichols; Zak Sally; Matt Livingston; Steve Garrington
- Website: www.alansparhawk.com

Low was an American indie rock band from Duluth, Minnesota, formed in 1993 by the husband and wife duo of Alan Sparhawk (guitar and vocals) and Mimi Parker (drums and vocals).

The band was a trio from their formation to 2020, having featured four different bassists. Their early music was pioneering in the slowcore genre, usually featuring quiet harmony vocals, a melancholy mood, and very slow tempos compared to other styles of rock and roll. However, Low's sound gradually developed over time to touch on other influences.

Low disbanded in 2022 following Parker's death.

== History ==
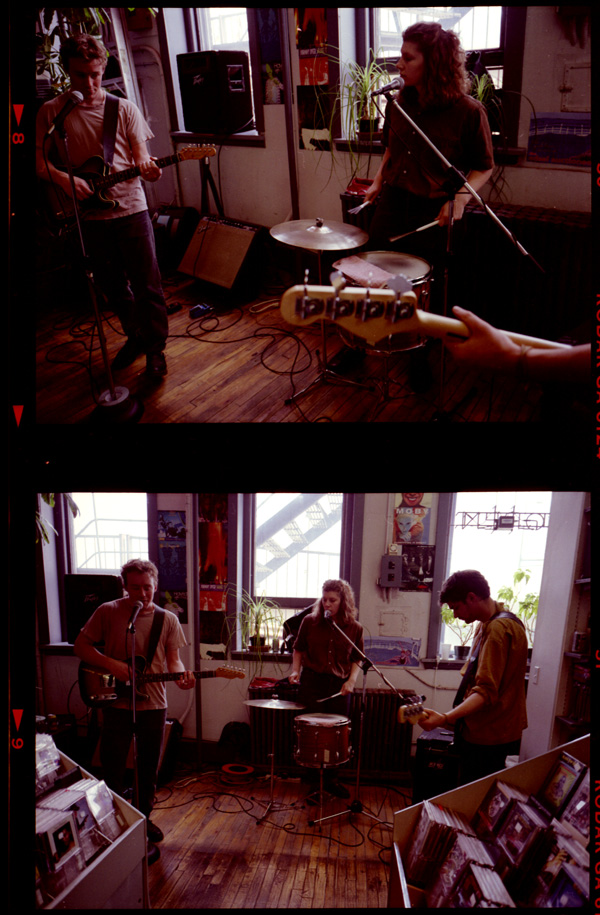
Low at Duluth's Electric Fetus

The band formed in early 1993. Sparhawk had been playing in the Superior, Wisconsin, band Zen Identity, the core of which was formed by drummer Robb Berry and vocalist Bill Walton. That band needed a new bassist, and recruited future Low bassist John Nichols. At that time, Nichols was a senior at Superior Senior High School, and bassist in the band Lorenzo's Tractor. Sparhawk taught Zen Identity songs to Nichols and during practices, the two started improvising with some very modest, quiet themes. As a joke, they wondered what would happen if they played such quiet music in front of Duluth, Minnesota, crowds, during a time when the most popular style of rock music was the loud, grunge, "post-punk" sound. Soon, the joke became a serious thought. Sparhawk left Zen Identity, who continued to perform and record without him, and he and Nichols recruited Sparhawk's wife Mimi Parker to play a very modest drum kit composed of a single snare drum, single cymbal, and a single floor tom. She was to use brushes almost exclusively, rather than drum sticks. Sparhawk said they played their first two shows in 1993 at the RecyclaBell in Duluth.

They began to send out demo tapes. One went to Kramer who had produced Galaxie 500, an influence of theirs. Kramer agreed to record them, and recommended them to an offshoot of Virgin Records; Vernon Yard.

Low's debut album, I Could Live in Hope, was released on Virgin Records' Vernon Yard imprint in 1994. It featured Nichols on bass, though he was replaced by Zak Sally, who joined for the recording of the band's next album Long Division. Both I Could Live in Hope and Long Division were produced and recorded by Kramer. Long Division and its similar follow-up, 1996's The Curtain Hits the Cast, established the band as critical darlings; extensive touring helped them to develop a highly devoted fan base. "Over the Ocean", a single drawn from The Curtain Hits the Cast, also became something of a hit on college radio.

By the time of their next full-length album, 1999's Secret Name, Low had moved to the independent label Kranky. In between, they released several singles and EPs. In 1999, Low joined forces with Dirty Three to record an In The Fishtank session for Konkurrent records. AllMusic called the six-song disc "some of the best material either unit has produced." Of particular note is the disc's lengthy cover of Neil Young's "Down by the River". 2001 saw the release of Things We Lost in the Fire.

The following year saw the release of the band's final full-length on Kranky, Trust. All three of the band's full-length releases on Kranky featured superstar producers: Secret Name and Things We Lost in the Fire feature the work of recording engineer Steve Albini, who proved sympathetic to capturing the band's strengths; while Trust was recorded by Tom Herbers along with Duluth engineer Eric Swanson and mixed by Tchad Blake at Peter Gabriel's Real World Studios.

In April 2003, Peter S. Scholtes of the Twin Cities weekly paper City Pages posted in his weblog that Zak Sally had left Low. The following month, the band posted an update to the news on their website: "We have all had to work through some personal things recently ... After sorting it out, the good news is that Zak is remaining in the band ..." In July 2003, they toured Europe with Radiohead, Sally in tow. Following a successful tour in early 2004, the band signed with indie label Sub Pop. To tie up the loose ends of the era, Low released a three-disc rarities compilation on its own Chairkickers label in 2004.

Beginning with Secret Name, the band have diversified their sound. The band use subtle electronic music touches to augment their sound, reflective of their tenure with Kranky and their exposure to the Midwest's post-rock scene. Adding a more overt rock element to their aesthetic, the band has used fuzz bass from Things We Lost In the Fire onward, and began using distorted lead guitar on Trust. The band's 2005 album, The Great Destroyer, nods even further in the direction of rock. Recorded with producer Dave Fridmann and released by Sub Pop in January 2005, The Great Destroyer has received mostly positive reviews; the Village Voice described the record's "comparatively thunderous verve".

Low cancelled the second leg of their extensive tour in support of The Great Destroyer in late spring of 2005. Sparhawk published a statement on the band's website, addressed directly to fans, detailing his personal problems with depression that resulted in the cancellation of the tour. In August 2005, Sparhawk announced his return to performance, embarking on a US tour with vocalist Mark Kozelek. In October 2005, Sally announced he was leaving the band. Low replaced Sally with Matt Livingston, a bassist and saxophonist from Duluth's musical scene. In addition to playing bass guitar, Livingston also played an antique Navy chaplain's pump organ in the group.

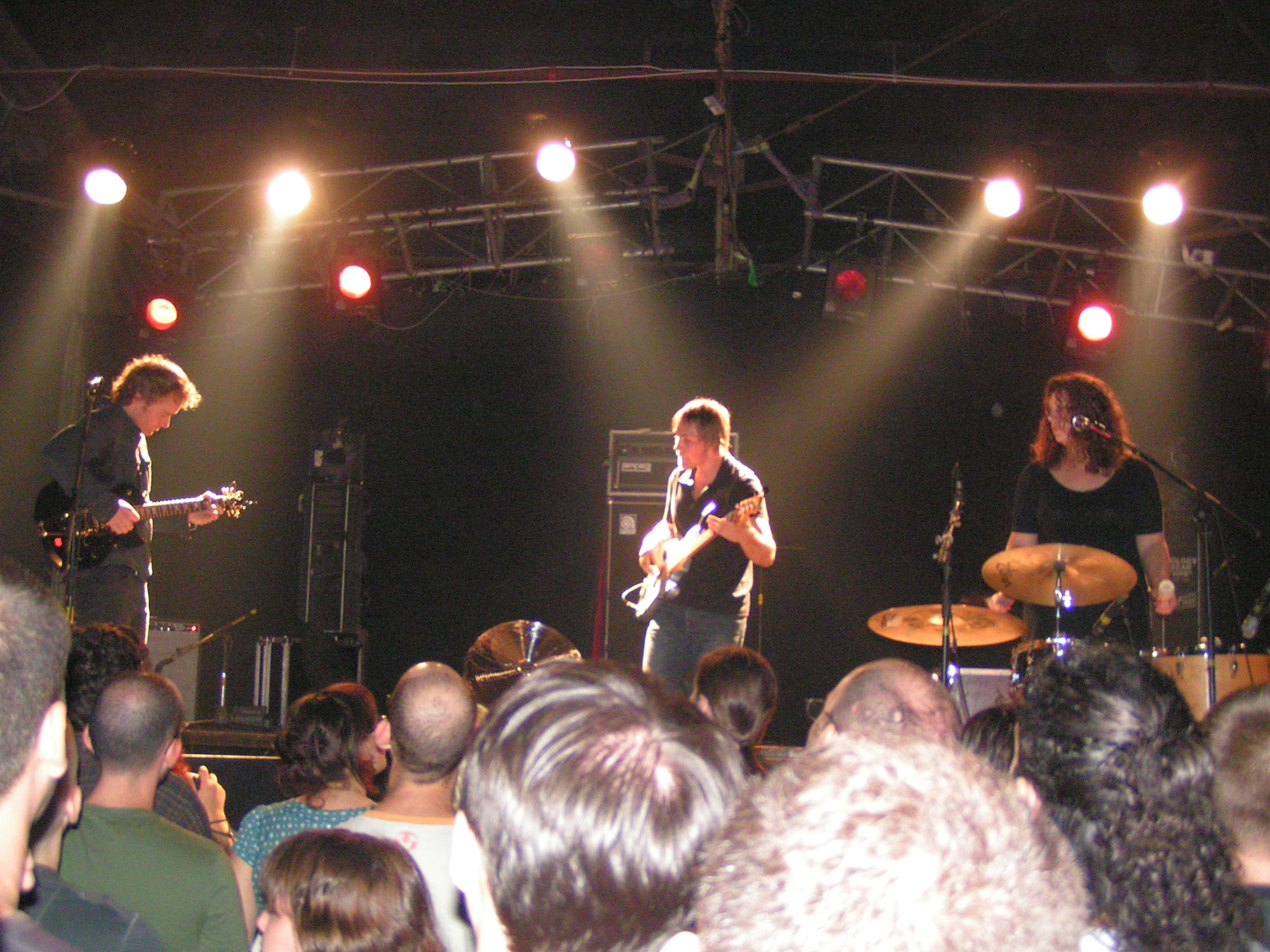
Low live in the Barby club, Tel Aviv, Israel, September 11, 2008

After appearing on 2007's Drums and Guns and touring with the group, Matt Livingston left Low in 2008, to be replaced by Steve Garrington. Garrington would perform with the band for the next 12 years and four studio albums: 2011's C'mon, 2013's The Invisible Way, 2015's Ones and Sixes and 2018's Double Negative.

Sparhawk and Parker provided guest vocals on "Lunacy", the opening track on Swans' 2012 album The Seer.

In June 2021, the band announced an upcoming release on Sub Pop entitled Hey What. The album was released on September 10. With the announcement of the album came news of Garrington's departure from the band a year prior, turning Low into an official duo for the first time in their career. It was soon announced that the band had hired Charlie Parr bassist Liz Draper to support Hey What on tour.

Parker was diagnosed with ovarian cancer in late 2020; she began treatment in 2021 and publicly revealed the diagnosis during a podcast interview in January 2022. In August 2022, the band cancelled some European shows to accommodate Parker's treatment. In September, the band cancelled its dates opening for Death Cab for Cutie in the United States. In October, the band cancelled the remainder of their 2022 European tour dates, due to continued concerns about Parker's health. Parker died on November 5, 2022.

Following Parker's death, Sparhawk focused his musical attention to a new project named Damien, featuring their son, Cyrus, on bass guitar, songwriter Marc Gartman on vocals and drummer Owen Mahon. Formed in late 2021, prior to Parker's death, the band's debut album The Boy Who Drew Cats was released in May 2023. Upon the album's release, Sparhawk noted: "I'm learning not to be surprised by anything. There is a weird process going on and I have to allow myself the possibility that I have no idea what I'm going to be by the end of this." In June 2023, Sparhawk confirmed via Twitter that Low had ended with Parker's passing. "Low is and was Mimi," he wrote. "It was amazing. I'm grateful."

== Performances ==
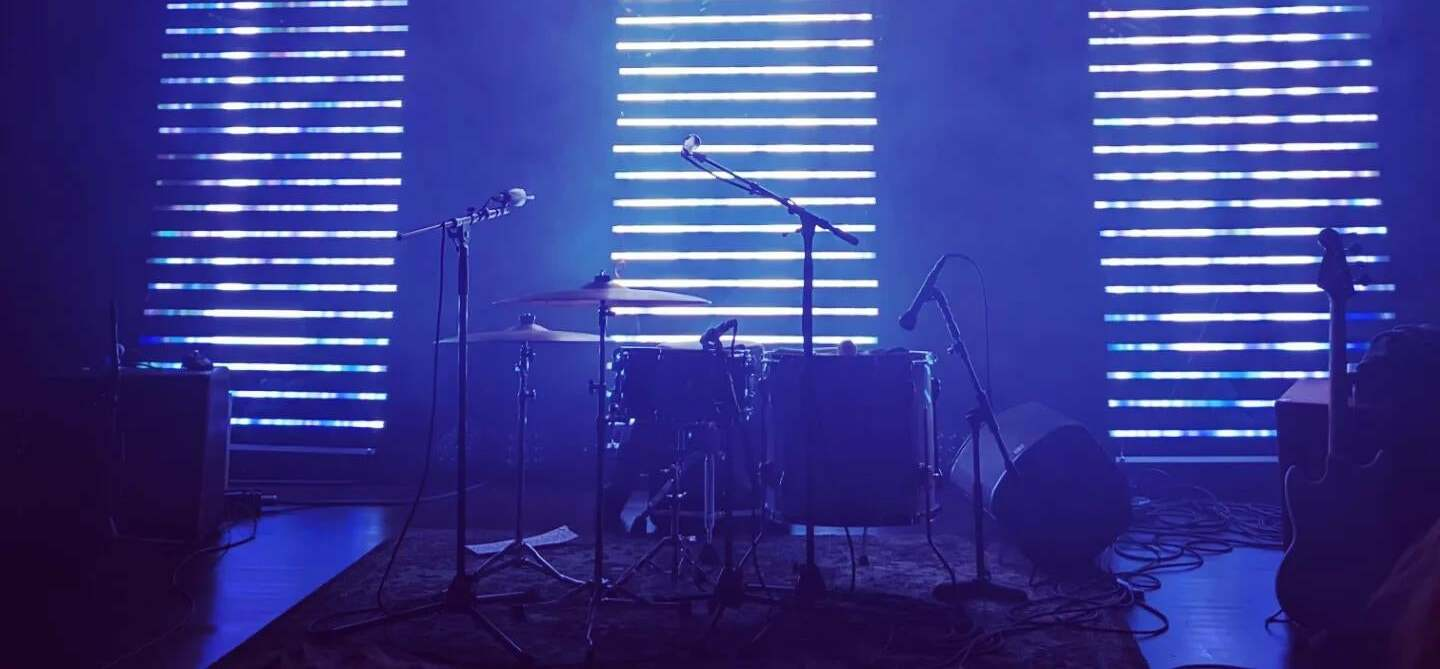
A defining feature of Low's sound for 30 years was the minimalist drum kit used by Mimi Parker, who would stand stage center between her husband, guitarist and vocalist Alan Sparhawk, and the band's bassist.

Low were known for their live performances. Rock club audiences sometimes watched the band while seated on the floor. During their early career, the band often faced unsympathetic and inattentive audiences in bars and clubs, to which they responded by bucking rock protocol and turning their volume down. The dynamic range of their early music made it susceptible to background noise and chatter, since many of their songs were very quiet. A performance in 1996 at the South by Southwest festival was overpowered when a Scandinavian hardcore band was booked downstairs. The Trust album marked a turning point, and Low's music developed a more emphatic sound.

Their shows often featured drastically reinterpreted cover versions of famous songs by Joy Division and The Smiths, in addition to their own original material. In performance, Low showed off a sense of humor not necessarily found on their recordings; a tour in early 2004 featured a cover of OutKast's hit song "Hey Ya!". At a gig in Los Angeles on Halloween 1998, the band took the stage as a Misfits tribute act, complete with corpse paint and black clothing.

At the 2008 End of the Road Festival in Dorset, England, Sparhawk abruptly ended the band's performance by ripping the strings and lead out of his guitar, throwing it to the ground and then hurling it into the crowd before exiting the stage. He had earlier informed the audience that it had been a "crappy day". In 2010 they performed The Great Destroyer at the Primavera Sound Festival in Barcelona. On Friday July 13, 2012, Low gave a candlelit concert at Halifax Minster in England.

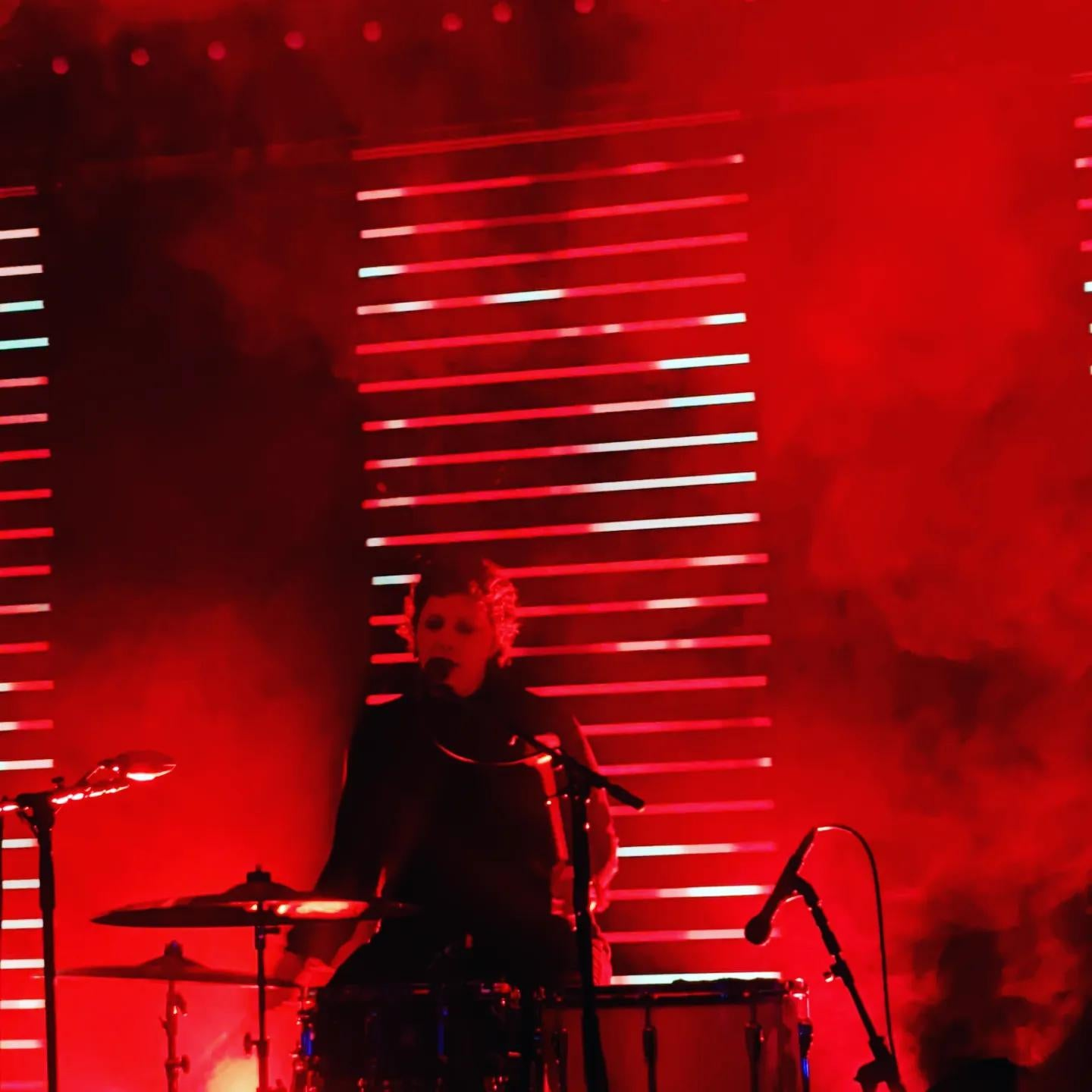
Founding member Mimi Parker on her final tour with Low before her 2022 death.

Low's performance at the 2013 Rock the Garden concert in Minneapolis consisted of a slowed and lengthened version of their drone rock song "Do You Know How to Waltz?" followed by Alan saying, "Drone, not drones," a reference to an anti-drone sticker made by Minneapolis's Luke Heiken; the performance resulted in mass audience confusion and divisive online discussion. The performance lasted half an hour and was broadcast live on radio station KCMP, which had been playing cuts of their recent album. Low had performed a more traditional show for KCMP at the Fitzgerald Theater earlier in the year.

Low played at the 2022 Primavera Sound festival in Barcelona, which would end up becoming one of their final sets. They notably covered Napalm Death's "You Suffer", and the festival uploaded the band's entire performance to YouTube.

On September 4, 2022, at what proved to be the band's final performance, Low took the stage at the Water Is Life Festival in Duluth.

== Musical style and influences ==
The music of Low was characterized by slow tempos and minimalist arrangements, and has been described as "atmospheric songs marked by long, unsettling silences." Jason Ankeny of AllMusic described the band's sound as "delicate, austere, and hypnotic." He assessed: "The trio's formative music rarely rose above a whisper, divining its dramatic tension in the unsettling open spaces created by the absence of sound." Early descriptions sometimes referred to the band's style as a rock subgenre called "slowcore", and Low were often compared to the band Bedhead, who also occasionally performed in the style in the 1990s. However, Low ultimately disapproved of the term.

Parker and Sparhawk's vocal harmonies represented perhaps the group's most distinctive element; critic Denise Sullivan writes that their shared vocals are "as chilling as anything Gram [Parsons] and Emmylou [Harris] ever conspired on—though that's not to say it's country-tinged, just straight from the heart." Low's style became increasingly experimental and adherent to post-rock over time, gradually incorporating elements of electronica and glitch music on later releases while retaining their minimalist approach.

Influences on Parker and Sparhawk as Low included R.E.M., Siouxsie and the Banshees, Simon & Garfunkel, Big Star, OMD, Young Marble Giants and the Velvet Underground. Sparhawk also cited Nick Cave as his all-time favorite artist, and abstract painter Mark Rothko as his "oddest musical inspiration".

== Legacy ==
The band's mainstream exposure was limited in the early part of their career. The band's version of "The Little Drummer Boy", played as a hymn, was featured in a Gap television ad that depicted a snowball fight in slow-motion to match the song's glacial tempo.

Starting with Things We Lost in the Fire (2001), Low's albums began to appear on sales charts in Europe; starting with The Great Destroyer (2005) they began to chart in the United States as well. A remix of their song "Halflight" was featured in the Mothman Prophecies motion picture in 2002. The band made their network television debut in 2005 by performing the single "California" on an episode of Last Call with Carson Daly. On June 11, 2007, Scott Bateman, a web animator, announced that his video for Low's song "Hatchet (Optimimi version)" would be one of the preloads on the new Microsoft Zune portable media player. That same year they recorded a song called "Family Tree" which featured in the "Careful" episode of the Nick Jr. kids' show Yo Gabba Gabba!

On March 24, 2008, their song "Point of Disgust" was featured in the UK television show Skins, prompting a rush of download sales from iTunes. Another of their songs, "Sunflower", was featured in the following episode (episode 9), and "Breaker" was featured in a later episode. As the music supervisor of Skins declared in the Episode Track Listing section of the show's official website: "You may have guessed by now that we are all pretty huge fans of Low in the Skins office".

The 2008 movie KillShot, starring Mickey Rourke and Diane Lane, features the song "Monkey" early in the film. The 2003 documentary film Tarnation by Jonathan Caouette features the Low tracks "Laser Beam", "Embrace", and "Back Home Again" alongside tracks by artists such as Red House Painters and The Magnetic Fields. "Laser Beam" also featured on episode 4 season 2 of the television show Misfits. Low was the subject of the 2008 documentary Low: You May Need a Murderer.

In 2010, Robert Plant recorded two Low songs from The Great Destroyer, "Monkey" and "Silver Rider", for his album Band of Joy. In an interview, Plant said of The Great Destroyer, "It's great music; it's always been in the house playing away beside Jerry Lee Lewis and Howlin' Wolf, you know. There's room for everything." Buddy Miller, who played guitar on Band of Joy, had worked with Low in the past.

The band were chosen by Jeff Mangum of Neutral Milk Hotel to perform at the All Tomorrow's Parties festival in March 2012 in Minehead, England.

Their song "Dancing and Blood" off of the album Double Negative was used as the end credit music for the 2025 A24 film Warfare, as well as episode six of the third season of Netflix series 13 Reasons Why, "You Can Tell the Heart of a Man by How He Grieves".

In 2024, alongside indie pop musician Perfume Genius, Sparhawk performed a version of "Point of Disgust" for the Red Hot Organization's compilation Transa. Their cover appeared on the fifth section of the record, labeled "Grief".

In 2025, Robert Plant recorded another song from The Great Destroyer, "Everybody's Song", for his album Saving Grace. It was released as the lead single on 16 July 2025.

== Personal lives ==
Alan Sparhawk
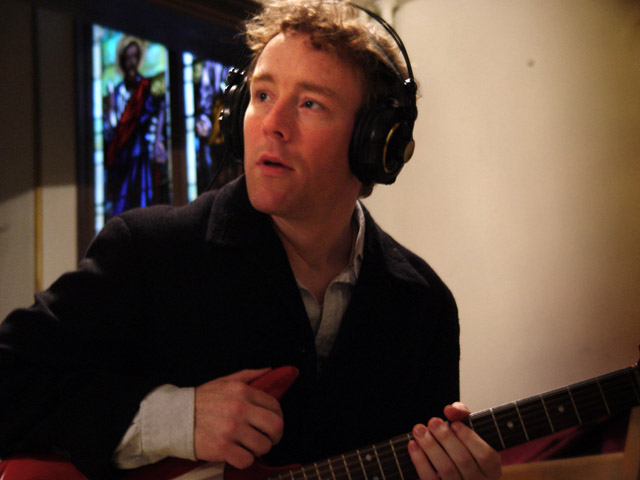
- Sparhawk in 2004 recording at Sacred Heart in Duluth

Background information
- Born: George Alan Sparhawk; Seattle, Washington, U.S.
- Origin: Duluth, Minnesota, U.S.
- Genres: Indie rock, slowcore
- Occupations: Musician, singer-songwriter
- Instruments: Vocals, guitar, keyboards, percussion
- Years active: 1993–present
- Formerly of: Black Eyed Snakes; The Hospital People; The Tooth Fairies; The Murder of Crows; Tired Eyes; Derecho; Damien

Mimi Parker
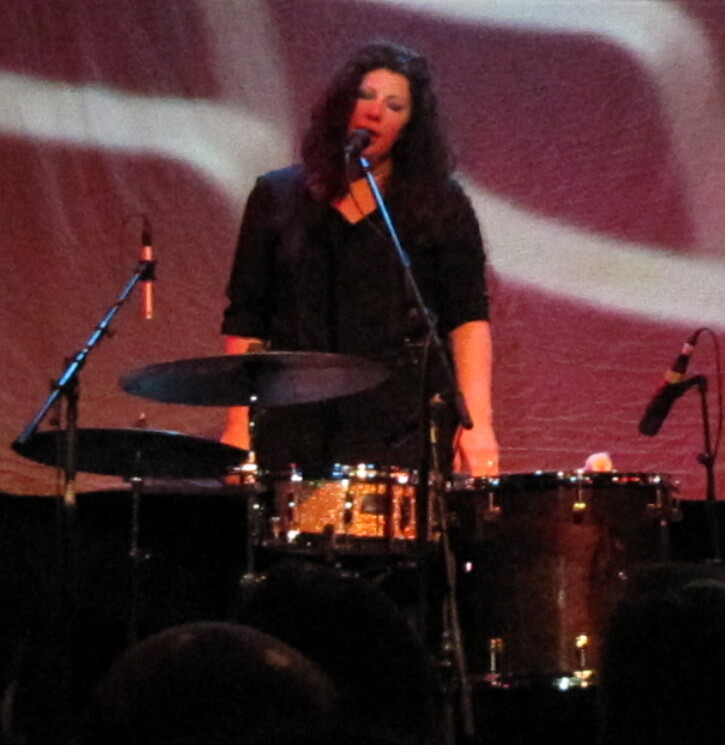
- Parker performing in 2013

Background information
- Born: Mimi Jo Parker; September 15, 1967; Bemidji, Minnesota, U.S.
- Origin: Clearbrook, Minnesota, U.S.
- Died: November 5, 2022 (aged 55) Duluth, Minnesota, U.S.
- Genres: Indie rock, slowcore
- Occupations: Musician, singer-songwriter
- Instruments: Vocals, percussion, drums
- Years active: 1993–2022
- Formerly of: Low

George Alan Sparhawk moved from Seattle to Minnesota when he was nine years old. He met Mimi Jo Parker (1967–2022) while they were both students at the same grade school in the small town of Clearbrook, Minnesota outside of Bemidji. They married and moved to Duluth, where they formed Low. Sparhawk is, and Parker was, a member of the Church of Jesus Christ of Latter-day Saints, about which Sparhawk said, "Our spiritual beliefs encompass our whole life and understanding of who we are and what we do." Sparhawk is self-diagnosed with autism and borderline personality disorder.

Sparhawk has done charity work with the Maasai tribe in Kenya. After a friend of his became a friend of the village of Namuncha, Sparhawk played a Christmas show to raise funds to build a school there, where students had previously been meeting in the shade outside. He calls the experience of visiting the Maasai one of the most spiritual of his life.

Parker was diagnosed with cancer in December 2020. She did not disclose her illness until mid-2021, when Low was forced to cancel multiple tour dates. She died on November 5, 2022.

Low announced Parker's death on their Twitter account on November 6 with the message: "Friends, it's hard to put the universe into language and into a short message, but she passed away last night, surrounded by family and love, including yours. Keep her name close and sacred. Share this moment with someone who needs you. Love is indeed the most important thing."

== Side projects ==
Low founded the record label Chairkickers' Union, which releases their own material as well as work by musicians such as Rivulets and Haley Bonar. Sparhawk is notably active in Duluth's small but vibrant independent music scene; he operates a recording studio in the town, in a deconsecrated church where the acoustics provided the lush reverb which was characteristic of Low's sound. Most of the musicians on the Chairkickers' Union label are based in Duluth and its environs.

Zak Sally has toured as a bassist with Dirty Three, and Sparhawk has devoted considerable time and energy to his Black Eyed Snakes project, a blues-rock revival band which plays a style of music that is dissimilar to that played by Low; in this group, Sparhawk performs under the pseudonym "Chicken-Bone George". Low and the Black-Eyed Snakes have played some of the same songs, including "Lordy". Sparhawk has also played with the Retribution Gospel Choir (RGC). Matt Livingston, who became Low's bassist in late 2005, also played in the RGC. On that band's first tour, which began in fall 2005, the group covered the Low song "From Your Place on Sunset". Songs have also crossed over in the other direction—Low covered the RGC songs "Hatchet" and "Breaker" on their Drums and Guns album.

Sparhawk released his debut solo album Solo Guitar in August 2006. As Hollis M. Sparhawk & Her Father, his track "Thanks 1 2 3 Watch" appeared on the 2002 compilation album "Songs for the End of the World" released by Duluth label Silber Records. Sparhawk contributed the song "Be Nice to People with Lice" to the Paper Bag Records compilation of children's songs See You on the Moon! released in 2006.

Sparhawk and Sally have recorded synthesizer-centric songs in the New Wave style under the name The Hospital People. Its most widely distributed record was "Crash / We'll Be Philosophers", released as a 7-inch on clear vinyl by Duck Suit Records. Sparhawk and Sally have also played live as The Tooth Fairies, with Sally performing on drums and Sean Erspamer on bass; Tooth Fairies sets have typically consisted of cover songs by the Stooges, MC5, and similar bands. Sally has done the art for several graphic novels, and he also did the artwork for former Pedro the Lion member David Bazan's first solo release, the EP Fewer Moving Parts (now part of the Barsuk Records catalog). At one time, Mimi Parker was rumored to have started a punk band called Rubbersnake, but this was an inside joke on the part of the band.

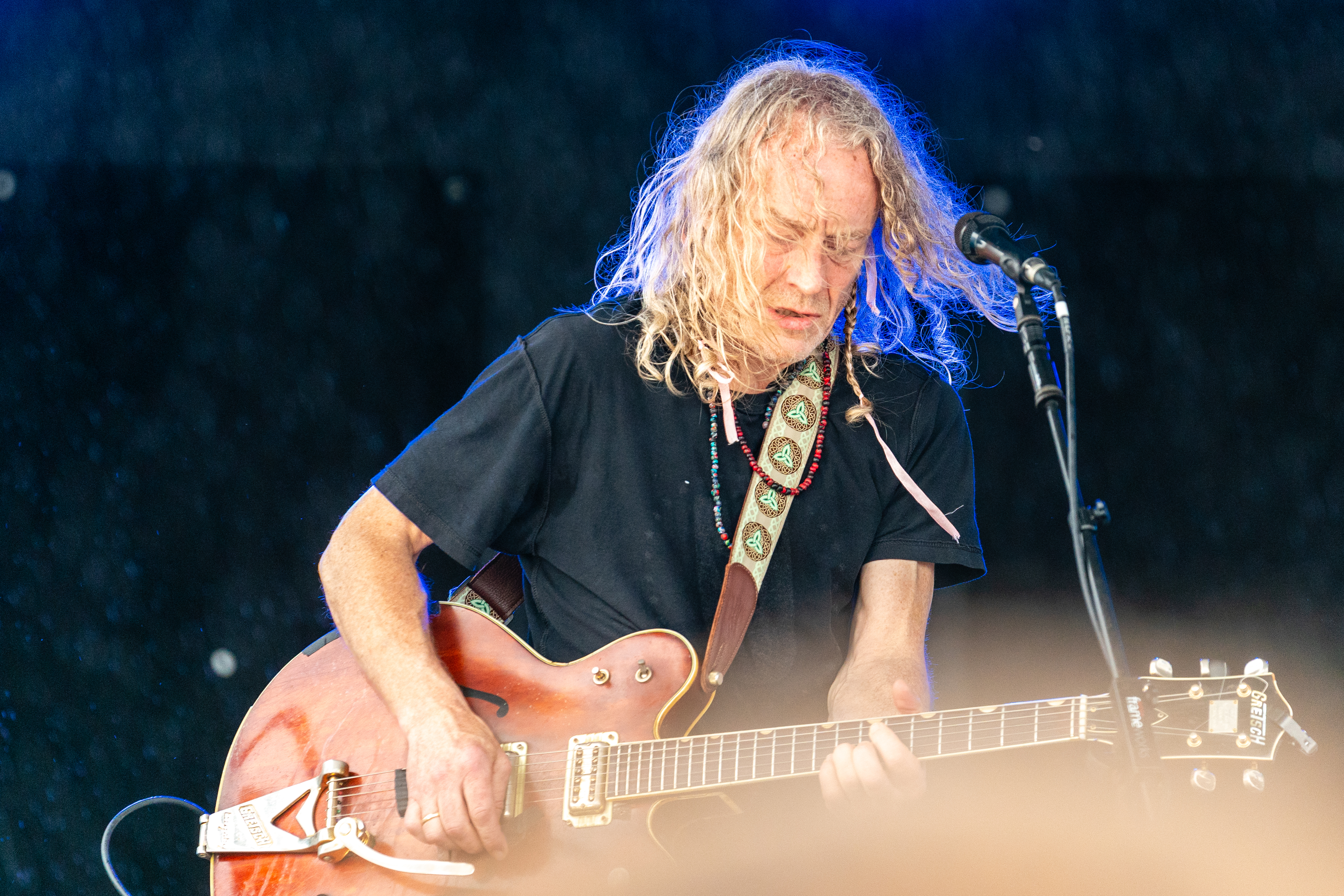
Sparhawk plays in Derecho Rhythm Section in the rain in Bemdiji on June 22, 2024.

In April 2012, Low collaborated with artist Peter Liversidge for a combined performance at the Royal Festival Hall in London. A year later, Low collaborated with Liversidge again for a performance at the Barbican Centre in London.

In 2011, Sparhawk began collaborating with Duluth violinist and vocalist Gaelynn Lea in a band called The Murder of Crows. The duo plays Lea's originals, instrumentals, and covers, using looping pedals and pared-down arrangements. Their first album, Imperfecta, was released in June 2012.

Sparhawk plays in the Neil Young tribute act Tired Eyes and Derecho Rhythm Section.

On September 27, 2024, Sparhawk released his second solo album, White Roses, My God. His third, Alan Sparhawk With Trampled by Turtles, was released on May 30, 2025.

Sparhawk also sang in the soundtrack to the 2025 film The Testament of Ann Lee, alongside Josephine Foster, Shelley Hirsch, Maggie Nicols, Phil Minton, and others.

== Honors and awards ==
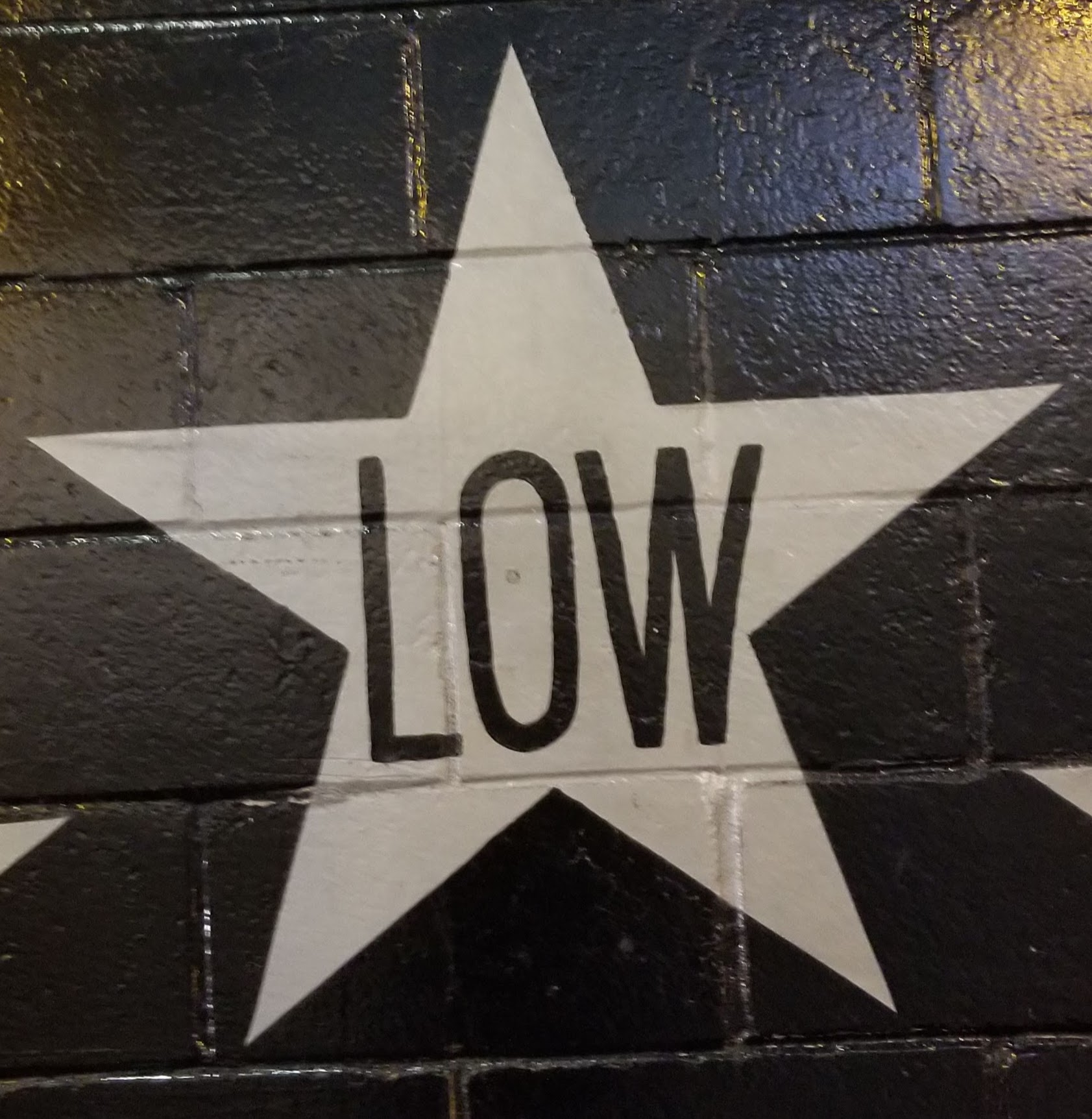
Low's star on the outside mural of the Minneapolis nightclub First Avenue

The band has been honored with a star on the outside mural of the Minneapolis nightclub First Avenue; the honor recognizes performers who have played sold-out shows at the iconic venue and have made major contributions to local culture. Receiving a star "might be the most prestigious public honor an artist can receive in Minneapolis," according to journalist Steve Marsh.

== Members ==
In chronological order

- Alan Sparhawk – vocals, guitar, keyboards, percussion (1993–2022)
- Mimi Parker – vocals, percussion, drums (1993–2022; died 2022)
- John Nichols – bass (1993–1994)
- Zak Sally – bass, keyboards (1994–2005)
- Matt Livingston – bass, backing vocals (2005–2008)
- Steve Garrington – bass, organ, piano (2008–2020)
- Liz Draper – bass (2021–2022; touring only)

Timeline

== Discography ==
=== Studio albums ===
List of studio albums, with selected details and chart positions
Year Released	Title	Record Label	Peak chart positions							
Year Released	Title	Record Label	US	AUT	FRA	GER	IRE	NLD	SWI	UK
1994	I Could Live in Hope	Vernon Yard	—	—	—	—	—	—	—	—
1995	Long Division	Vernon Yard	—	—	—	—	—	—	—	—
1996	The Curtain Hits the Cast	Vernon Yard	—	—	—	—	—	—	—	—
1999	Secret Name	Kranky	—	—	—	—	—	—	—	—
2001	Things We Lost in the Fire	Kranky	—	—	—	—	—	—	—	81
2002	Trust	Kranky	—	—	—	—	52	—	—	—
2005	The Great Destroyer	Sub Pop	— (Note: The Great Destroyer did not enter the Billboard 200, but peaked at number 13 on the Top Heatseekers chart.)	—	190	—	30	—	—	72
2007	Drums and Guns	Sub Pop	196	—	—	—	54	—	—	92
2011	C'mon	Sub Pop	73	—	—	—	55	—	—	49
2013	The Invisible Way	Sub Pop	76	—	190	—	39	99	—	44
2015	Ones and Sixes	Sub Pop	158	—	115	—	45	34	—	35
2018	Double Negative	Sub Pop	—	—	190	—	69	114	52	26
2021	Hey What	Sub Pop	—	75	193	32	44	27	37	23

=== EPs ===
- Low (Summershine, 1994)
- Finally... (Vernon Yard Recordings, 1996)
- Transmission (Vernon Yard Recordings, 1996)
- Songs for a Dead Pilot (Kranky, 1997)
- Christmas (Kranky, 1999)
- Bombscare with Spring Heel Jack (Tugboat, 2000)
- The Exit Papers (Temporary Residence Limited, 2000) – "a soundtrack to an imaginary film"
- In the Fishtank 7 with Dirty Three (In the Fishtank, 2001)
- Murderer (Vinyl Films, 2003)
- Plays Nice Places (2012)

=== Singles ===
- "Over the Ocean" (maxi-single) – (Vernon Yard Recordings, 1996)
- "If You Were Born Today (Song for Little Baby Jesus)" (7") – (Wurlitzer Jukebox, 1997)
- "No Need" (split maxi-single with Dirty Three) – (Touch And Go, 1997)
- "Venus" 7" (Sub Pop, 1997)
- "Joan of Arc" 7" (Tugboat, 1998)
- "Sleep at the Bottom" (split 7" with Piano Magic & Transient Waves) – (Rocket Girl, 1998)
- "Immune" 7" (Tugboat, 1999)
- "Dinosaur Act" 7", maxi-single (Tugboat, 2000)
- "K. / Low" split 7", maxi-single (Tiger Style, 2001)
- "Last Night I Dreamt That Somebody Loved Me" / "Because You Stood Still" CD single (Chairkickers' Music, 2001)
- "Canada" 7", maxi-single (Rough Trade (UK), 2002)
- "David & Jude / Stole Some Sentimental Jewellery" split 7" with Vibracathedral Orchestra (Misplaced Music, 2002)
- "California" maxi-single (Rough Trade (UK), 2004)
- "Tonight" 12", maxi-single (Buzzin' Fly, 2004)
- "Hatchet (Optimimi Version)" 7" (Sub Pop, 2007)
- "Santa's Coming Over" 7" (Sub Pop, 2008)
- "Just Make It Stop" (Sub Pop, 2013)
- "Stay" (Sub Pop, 2013) – Rihanna cover, digital release
- "What Part of Me" (Sub Pop, 2015)
- "Lies" (Sub Pop, 2015)
- Low / S. Carey – "Not a Word" / "I Won't Let You" (Sub Pop, 2016, Record Store Day Release)'
- "Let's Stay Together" (2018) – Al Green cover
- "Quorum" / "Dancing and Blood" / "Fly" (2018)
- "Days Like These" (Sub Pop, 2021)

=== Live albums ===
- Maybe They Are Not Liking the Human Beings (Saturday Night Beaver, 1998) – semi-official release
- One More Reason to Forget (Bluesanct, 1998)
- Paris '99: "Anthony, Are You Around?" (P-Vine, 2001)

=== Miscellaneous ===
- owL Remix (Vernon Yard Recordings, 1998)
- The Mothman Prophecies – Music from the Motion Picture – "Half Light (Single)", "Half Light (Tail Credit)" (Lakeshore Records, 2002)
- A Lifetime of Temporary Relief: 10 Years of B-Sides and Rarities box set (Chairkickers' Music, 2004)
- We Could Live in Hope: A Tribute to Low (Fractured Discs, 2004)
- Tonight The Monkeys Die (Low Remixes) (Chairkickers' Music, 2005)

=== Compilations ===
- A Means to an End: The Music of Joy Division (Hut Recordings, 1995)
- Indie-Rock Flea Market Part 2 7" (Flip Recording Company, 1995)
- New Music June (College Music Journal, 1995)
- The Paper 7" (Papercut Records, 1997)
- A Tribute to Spacemen 3 (Rocket Girl, 1998)
- Astralwerks 1998 Summer Sampler (Astralwerks, 1998)
- Kompilation (Southern Records, 1998)
- Shanti Project Collection (Badman Recording Co. Jr., 1999)
- Duluth Does Dylan (Spinout Records, 2000)
- Take Me Home: A Tribute to John Denver (Badman Recording Co., 2000)
- A Rocket Girl Compilation (Rocket Girl, 2001)
- Benicàssim 2001 (Festival Internacional de Benicàssim, 2001)
- *Seasonal Greetings (Mobile Records, 2002)
- Une Rentrée 2002 – Tome 1 (Les Inrockuptibles, 2002)
- Another Country – Songs of Dignity & Redemption from the Other Side of the Tracks (Agenda, 2003)
- Buzzin' Fly Volume One: Replenishing Music for the Modern Soul (Buzzin' Fly Records, 2004)
- The Trip – Snow Patrol (Family Recordings (UK), 2004)
- Duyster. (Play It Again Sam (PIAS), 2005)
- This Bird Has Flown – A 40th Anniversary Tribute to the Beatles' Rubber Soul (Razor & Tie, 2005)
- Rough Trade Shops – Counter Culture 05 (V2, 2006)
- Elegy Sampler 47 (Elegy, 2007)
- Sounds – Now! (Musikexpress, 2007)
- Dead Man's Town: A Tribute to Springsteen's Born in the U.S.A (Lightning Rod, 2014)
