= White Roses, My God =

Studio album by Alan Sparhawk
- Released: September 27, 2024
- Recorded: 2023
- Studio: 20 Below Studios (Duluth, Minnesota)
- Length: 34:54
- Label: Sub Pop
- Producer: Alan Sparhawk; Nat Harvie

Alan Sparhawk chronology
Solo Guitar (2006)	White Roses, My God (2024)	Alan Sparhawk with Trampled by Turtles (2025)

Singles from White Roses, My God
- 1. "Can U Hear" Released: July 16, 2024; 2. "Get Still" Released: August 20, 2024; 3. "Heaven" Released: September 25, 2024

White Roses, My God is the second solo album by former Low guitarist/vocalist Alan Sparhawk, released on September 27, 2024, by Sub Pop. It is Sparhawk's first album since the death of his wife and bandmate, Mimi Parker, and the subsequent end of their band. Sparhawk began recording for the album in late 2023. It was preceded by three singles. The album charted at #20 in the UK Independent Albums Chart.

== Background and release ==
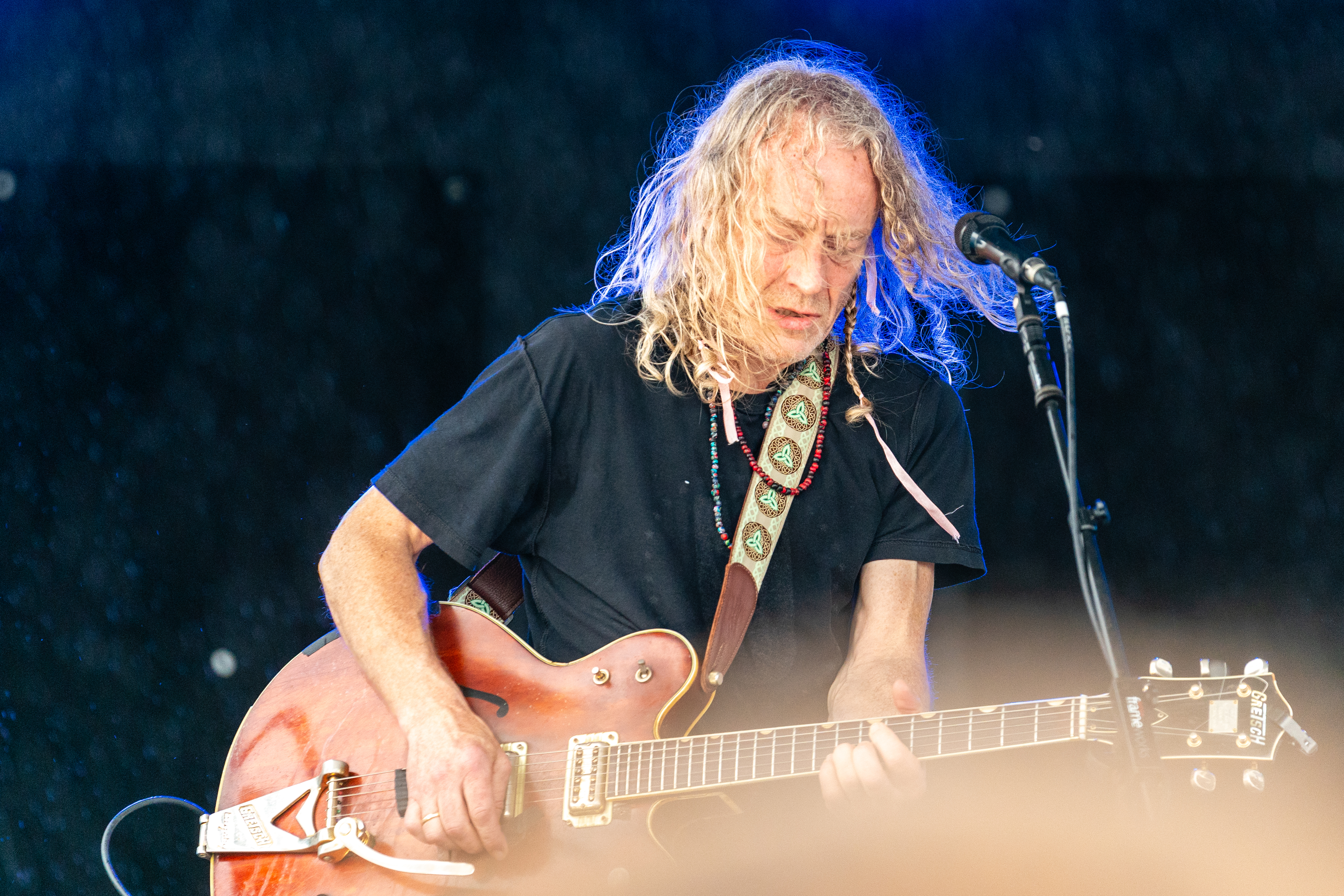
Sparhawk in June 2024.

White Roses, My God is Sparhawk's first album since his wife and Low bandmate Mimi Parker died of ovarian cancer in 2022, and the subsequent retirement of the band. Encouraged by his friend, Lambchop's Kurt Wagner, Sparhawk returned to live performances. He played shows with his and Parker's daughter Hollis, opened for Lambchop and Godspeed You! Black Emperor, and played a solo set at Utrecht music festival Le Guess Who? 2023. Low had cancelled their headlining set at the 2022 edition of Le Guess Who? due to Parker's health, and she died a week before the festival.

Sparhawk also started recording around the same time, and started two new groups: punk funk band Derecho Rhythm Section, and funky electronic duo Damien with his and Parker's son Cyrus. A second solo album, a collaborative project with Duluth, Minnesota, folk band Trampled by Turtles, began during that time.

Sparhawk first mentioned White Roses, My God in an interview with The New Yorker's Justin Taylor, published April 11, 2024. At the time, he said the album would be released in late 2024. Sparhawk later shared on Low's Twitter account that the album would be released by Sub Pop in "late September", and that its first song would be released in July.

The album was officially announced on July 16, with a release date set for September 27 by Sub Pop. The lead single, "Can U Hear", was released the same day, accompanied by a music video directed by Rick Alverson. The song is electronic and "near-industrial".

The second single, "Get Still", was released on August 20, accompanied by a music video directed by Ingrid Weise. Like "Can U Hear", "Get Still" consists of electronic instrumentation, with Sparhawk's "voice so heavily Auto-Tuned that it no longer sounds recognizably human." The third single, "Heaven", was released on September 25, 2024, with a music video directed by Alverson.

When asked on Twitter about the album name's significance, Sparhawk said, "Mim loved roses, and sometimes I think she is God."

== Recording ==
The album was recorded at 20 Below Studios in Duluth, Minnesota. Sparhawk produced and recorded along with Nat Harvie, who also mixed the album, and Heba Kadry mastered it. On these recordings, Sparhawk said he "was messing with this rigid stuff. There were moments where it would quickly become very visceral, very spontaneous. You've created the structure for it to happen and come through you, but you're trusting the universe about what is going to come in." Those recordings included him experimenting with improvising guitar and pitch-shifted vocals over a preset synthesizer clocked to a drum machine.

== Style ==
Stylistically, White Roses, My God follows Low's last two albums, 2018's Double Negative and 2021's Hey What, in applying layers of distortion over otherwise-straightforward songwriting. Going further down that route, Sparhawk included synthesizers, drum machines, dance beats, and pitch-shifted vocals. All of the album's vocals were recorded with a vocoder. Influences included Prince's alter ego Camille and Neil Young's album Trans.

== Reception ==
Keith Harris of the website Racket placed White Roses, My God at No. 8 on his list of the best 2024 albums by Minnesota artists, writing that "It's a work about death as how could it not be, and also a work of survival, and its sound demands metaphors—of self-mutilation, willed ego death, or simply transformation."

== Track listing ==
All tracks are written by Alan Sparhawk.

White Roses, My God track listing
No.	Title	Length
1.	"Get Still"	3:43
2.	"I Made This Beat"	1:53
3.	"Not the 1"	2:28
4.	"Can U Hear"	3:29
5.	"Heaven"	1:07
6.	"Brother"	4:30
7.	"Black Water"	3:34
8.	"Feel Something"	3:21
9.	"Station"	3:44
10.	"Somebody Else's Room"	3:48
11.	"Project 4 Ever"	3:17
Total length:		34:54

== Personnel ==
- Alan Sparhawk – drum machines, synthesizers, guitar, vocals, producer, recording engineer, art director
- Cyrus Sparhawk – bass
- Hollis Sparhawk, Leah Sanderson, and Nona Invie – backing vocals
- Nat Harvie – producer, recording and mixing engineer
- Heba Kadry – mastering engineer
- Jeff Kleinsmith – art director, designer
