= Supreme Dicks =

American experimental rock group

- Origin: Amherst, Massachusetts, U.S.
- Genres: Experimental rock, indie rock, noise rock, alternative rock, psychedelic rock
- Years active: 1984–1996, 2012–present
- Labels: Funky Mushroom, Homestead, Freek, Infinite Chug, Runt, Jagjaguwar
- Members: Jon Shere; Dan Oxenberg; Mark Hanson; Steve Shavel; Jim Spring.

Supreme Dicks is an experimental rock group formed in 1984 by Jon Shere and Stuart Morris while students at Hampshire College.

The primary band members are Jon Shere, Daniel Oxenberg, Mark Hansen, Steve Shavel, and often Jim Spring. Other members at various times have included Holly Cat, Dan Kapelovitz, Jennifer Stefanisko, John Galvin III, Jenna Wikler, and Dave Taub. Musicians who have joined them onstage include Beck and Ariel Pink. The band has performed with Dinosaur Jr., and toured with Neutral Milk Hotel, Kurt Vile, and Bonnie Prince Billy.

Their retrospective box set Breathing and Not Breathing was released on the Jagjaguwar label October 18, 2011.

The band played several shows in 2012, including three at South by Southwest, followed by a short tour with Kurt Vile. They were joined onstage for all of these shows by Holly Cat, known for the 1987 hit "I Wanna Be Like Madonna." The band toured Europe in 2013, and have continued to play shows sporadically, mostly in Los Angeles.

== Discography ==
=== Studio albums ===
- The Unexamined Life – Homestead Records (1993)
- The Emotional Plague – Homestead Records (1996)

=== Singles and EPs ===
- Sky Puddle (7") – Funky Mushroom Records (1992)
- One Day West (7" split with One Small Good Thing) – Infinite Chug (1995)
- This Is Not a Dick EP – Runt (1996)

=== Compilation albums ===
- Working Man's Dick – Freek Records (1994)
- Breathing and Not Breathing – Jagjaguwar Records (2011)
