= Working Man's Dick =

Compilation album by Supreme Dicks
- Released: September 13, 1994
- Recorded: 1987–1989
- Genre: Experimental rock, indie rock, psychedelic rock
- Length: 67:06
- Label: Freek

Supreme Dicks chronology
The Unexamined Life (1993)	Working Man's Dick (1994)	The Emotional Plague (1996)

Professional ratings
Review scores
Source	Rating
Allmusic	4/5 stars

Working Man's Dick is a compilation album by the band Supreme Dicks, released through September 13, 1994 on Freek Records.

== Track listing ==
All tracks are written by Supreme Dicks.

No.	Title	Length
1.	"Ranada's Demon"	3:06
2.	"The Language You Learnt"	3:31
3.	"All That Returns"	3:25
4.	"In the Whippoorwill's Sad Orchard"	2:52
5.	"Blue Elephant"	3:08
6.	"The Pear Thripe"	5:55
7.	"Flaming Day of the Locusts"	5:33
8.	"Andy Herman Song"	3:42
9.	"For Now"	2:13
10.	"Descension Song"	5:18
11.	"The Pusher"	1:26
12.	"Hyacinth Girls"	2:30
13.	"Arise! Life Giving Seagull"	1:38
14.	"Talking Mody Dick Blues"	3:35
15.	"Sround-Like Remains"	2:57
16.	"The Baal Shem"	4:18
17.	"The Searcher"	2:28
18.	"Night at the Opera"	0:52
19.	"Chateaux Banana!" (parts XIII-XVI)	6:54
20.	"Viva la Speedy Orgone"	1:45

== Personnel ==
Supreme Dicks

- Mark Hanson – bass guitar, drums, vocals
- Daniel Oxenberg – guitar, vocals
- Steven Shavel – slide guitar, vocals
- Jon Shere – guitar, vocals
- Jim Spring – guitar

Production and additional personnel

- Lev – cover art
