= Secret Name (album) =

Studio album by Low
- Released: March 30, 1999
- Recorded: November 20–28, 1998
- Genres: Indie rock; slowcore
- Length: 52:09
- Label: Kranky/Tugboat
- Producer: Steve Albini

Low chronology
The Curtain Hits the Cast (1996)	Secret Name (1999)	Things We Lost in the Fire (2001)

Professional ratings
Review scores
Source	Rating
AllMusic	4/5 stars
The Encyclopedia of Popular Music	3/5 stars
Mojo	5/5 stars
NME	8/10
Pitchfork	7.6/10
PopMatters	7/10
Q	4/5 stars

Secret Name is the fourth studio album by American indie rock band Low. It was released in 1999, their first album on the Kranky record label. The album was recorded by Steve Albini at Electrical Audio in Chicago.

Bass guitarist Zak Sally plays an Optigan on some tracks. The album title comes from the "Weight of Water" lyric: "Make a river through the sand, 'Til you're called by a secret name."

== Critical reception ==
The A.V. Club called the album "a consistently striking, resonant collection." The Washington Post wrote that "Low has accomplished something new without neglecting the serenity that initially made its music distinctive."

== Track listing ==
No.	Title	Lead vocals	Length
1.	"I Remember"	Alan Sparhawk	4:11
2.	"Starfire"	Sparhawk, Mimi J. Parker	3:06
3.	"Two-Step"	Sparhawk (first part), Parker (second part)	5:49
4.	"Weight of Water"	Parker	4:21
5.	"Missouri"	Sparhawk	4:04
6.	"Don't Understand"	Sparhawk	6:56
7.	"Soon"	Sparhawk	5:13
8.	"Immune"	Sparhawk, Parker	3:31
9.	"Lion/Lamb"	Sparhawk	4:13
10.	"Days of..."	Parker	5:57
11.	"Will the Night"	Sparhawk, Parker	2:23
12.	"Home"	Sparhawk	2:26
Total length:			52:09
