= The Curtain Hits the Cast =

Studio album by Low
- Released: August 13, 1996
- Recorded: January–February 1996
- Studios: Jon & Stu's in Seattle
- Length: 65:01
- Label: Vernon Yard
- Producer: Steve Fisk

Low chronology
Long Division (1995)	The Curtain Hits the Cast (1996)	Secret Name (1999)

Professional ratings
Review scores
Source	Rating
AllMusic	4/5 stars
NME	6/10
Pitchfork	8.5/10
Rolling Stone	4/5 stars
Spin	7/10

The Curtain Hits the Cast is the third studio album by American indie rock band Low. It was released in 1996 on Vernon Yard Recordings.

== Release ==
The Curtain Hits the Cast was released on Vernon Yard Recordings in 1996. The album's cover photograph shows almost the entirety of member Mimi Parker's minimalist drum kit. "Lust" was released as part of a four-way split 7-inch (on clear green vinyl) entitled Indie Rock Flea Market, at around the same time.

Following the release of the album, the band's major-label-funded tenure ended and they moved to Kranky. LP-only tracks "Prisoner" and "Tomorrow One" later appeared on the 2004 rarities box set A Lifetime of Temporary Relief: 10 Years of B-Sides and Rarities.

== Track listing ==
All tracks are written by Low.

CD version
No.	Title	Lead vocals	Length
1.	"Anon"	Alan Sparhawk	4:18
2.	"The Plan"	Mimi J. Parker	3:40
3.	"Over the Ocean"	Sparhawk	3:47
4.	"Mom Says"	Sparhawk	5:19
5.	"Coattails"	Parker	6:51
6.	"Standby"	Sparhawk	5:09
7.	"Laugh"	Sparhawk	9:34
8.	"Lust"	Sparhawk	4:04
9.	"Stars Gone Out"	Sparhawk	4:26
10.	"Same"	Sparhawk	2:05
11.	"Do You Know How to Waltz?"	Sparhawk, Parker	14:37
12.	"Dark"	Sparhawk	0:53

Vinyl version
No.	Title	Lead vocals	Length
1.	"Anon"	Sparhawk	4:18
2.	"The Plan"	Parker	3:40
3.	"Over the Ocean"	Sparhawk	3:47
4.	"Mom Says"	Sparhawk	5:19
5.	"Coattails"	Parker	6:51
6.	"Standby"	Sparhawk	5:09
7.	"Laugh"	Sparhawk	9:34
8.	"Lust"	Sparhawk	4:04
9.	"Stars Gone Out"	Sparhawk	4:26
10.	"Prisoner"	Sparhawk	3:46
11.	"Tomorrow One"	Sparhawk	4:28
12.	"Same"	Sparhawk	2:05
13.	"Do You Know How to Waltz?"	Sparhawk, Parker	14:37
14.	"Dark"	Sparhawk	0:53

== Personnel ==
Low

- Alan Sparhawk – guitars, vocals, keyboards
- Mimi Parker – percussion, vocals
- Zak Sally – bass guitar, keyboards

Additional personnel

- Steve Fisk – keyboards
