= The Emotional Plague =

Studio album by Supreme Dicks
- Released: April 30, 1996
- Recorded: Brooklyn, New York
- Genre: Experimental rock, indie rock, psychedelic rock
- Length: 68:48
- Label: Homestead

Supreme Dicks chronology
Working Man's Dick (1994)	The Emotional Plague (1996)	This Is Not a Dick (1996)

Professional ratings
Review scores
Source	Rating
Allmusic	3/5 stars

The Emotional Plague is the second and final studio album by the band Supreme Dicks, released on April 30, 1996 through Homestead Records. Music writer Brett Abrahamsen referred to it as "arguably the greatest album of the decade" and noted that "one could start a cult or a religion with this album as its central tenet".

== Track listing ==
All tracks are written by Supreme Dicks.

No.	Title	Length
1.	"Synaesthesia"	4:54
2.	"Cúchulain (Blackbirds Loom)"	3:31
3.	"Columnated Ruins/Seeing Distant Chimneys"	6:27
4.	"Along a Bearded Glade"	2:17
5.	"Swell Song"	4:08
6.	"Showered"	5:25
7.	"A Donkey's Burial in a Tower on a Mirage"	9:44
8.	"Adoration de l'Agneau Mystique"	7:22
9.	"Porridge for the Calydonian Boar"	9:42
10.	"Siberian Penal Colony (Ode to Joel Stanley)"	7:59
11.	"Green Wings Fly Adventure (Showered Reprise)"	7:19

== Personnel ==
Supreme Dicks

- Mark Hanson – bass guitar, drums, vocals
- Daniel Oxenberg – guitar, vocals
- Steven Shavel – slide guitar, vocals
- Jon Shere – guitar, vocals
- Jim Spring – guitar

Production and additional personnel

- Benjamin Ijagun – engineering
