= Namuncha =

Community in Nakuru County, Kenya

Namuncha is a community in the south of Nakuru County, Kenya an hour north of Nairobi.

== Population ==
The Maasai people make up the majority of Namuncha's population followed by the Turkana and Kikuyu peoples. The predominant languages are Maa (the Maasai language), Kikuyu, and Swahili. Agriculture and pastoralism are the main sources of subsistence. There is an open-pit quarry located near the river that employs a number of residents.

Mr Dalhman Lerru is Namuncha's elected community chairman after the death of Joseph Ole Kishau in 2021.

== Water resources ==
A seasonal source of water is the Ewuaso Kedong River. Constructed in the 1990s, there is a water pipeline that runs through the community. In January and February 2005, there were armed conflicts between Maasai pastoralists and Kikuyu farmers over access to water. Both Maasai and Kikuyu sustained casualties with a total of 18 reported killed. The Namuncha Primary School has a wind driven water pump the provides water for handwashing, irrigation and clean water through a filter tank. The water is drawn from one of the reservoirs built along the water pipeline.

== Education ==
There is a primary school with eight teachers that serves children from grades 1 - 8 for free. There is The Peace Namuncha Secondary School founded in 2012. It is registered with the Ministry of Education and has an annual intake of 60 students, mostly from the Namuncha Primary school. The Friends of Namuncha, a UK based Charity supports, Education, Health and Sustainable Enterprise in Namuncha

== Religion ==
Christianity is a dominant religion in Namuncha, along with traditional beliefs. There are a number of denominations within the community including; Africa Inland Mission (AIC), Catholics and Methodists. The pastors of these churches form a non-profit called the Osotua Welfare Society led by Rev.Dr. Simon Koisaba of Namuncha AIC.

== Health ==
The nearest source of medicine is at the Namuncha Dispensary that is staffed with two full time nurses. There is another health facility at Ewuaso Kedong.
