= Solo Guitar (Alan Sparhawk album) =

Studio album by Alan Sparhawk
- Released: July 25, 2006
- Genre: Ambient
- Length: 43:08
- Label: Silber

Alan Sparhawk chronology
Solo Guitar (2006)	White Roses, My God (2024)

Professional ratings
Review scores
Source	Rating
Pitchfork	7/10 stars

Solo Guitar is the 2006 album by Low frontman Alan Sparhawk. Always staying true to its name, the album features several musical vignettes, the sounds of which attempt to recreate the situations described in their titles, for instance, "How The Weather Comes Over The Central Hillside". The album is almost entirely made up of avant-garde and ambient soundscapes, rarely venturing into melodic music.

== Track listing ==
1. "How the Weather Comes Over the Central Hillside"
2. "Sagrado Corazón de Jesú (First Attempt)"
3. "Sagrado Corazón de Jesú (Second Attempt)"
4. "How a Freighter Comes into the Harbor"
5. "How the Weather Hits the Freighter...."
6. "In the Harbor"
7. "How the Engine Room Sounds"
8. "Eruption by Eddie Van Halen"
9. "How It Ends"
