= Trust (Low album) =

Studio album by Low
- Released: October 21, 2002
- Genres: Dream pop, post-rock, slowcore
- Length: 64:41
- Label: Kranky

Low chronology
In the Fishtank 7 (2001)	Trust (2002)	The Great Destroyer (2005)

Professional ratings
Aggregate scores
Source	Rating
Metacritic	76/100
Review scores
Source	Rating
AllMusic	3.5/5 stars
Blender	4/5 stars
NME	8/10
Pitchfork	6.5/10
The Times	4/5 stars
Uncut	4/5 stars

Trust is the sixth studio album by American indie rock band Low. It was released on October 21, 2002 on the Kranky label. The album was mastered by John Golden, mixed by Tchad Blake and recorded by Tom Herbers.

== Track listing ==
No.	Title	Lead vocals	Length
1.	"(That's How You Sing) Amazing Grace"	Alan Sparhawk	7:13
2.	"Canada"	Sparhawk, Mimi Parker	3:44
3.	"Candy Girl"	Sparhawk	4:37
4.	"Time Is the Diamond"	Sparhawk, Parker	5:30
5.	"Tonight"	Parker	4:05
6.	"The Lamb"	Sparhawk	7:12
7.	"In the Drugs"	Sparhawk	4:25
8.	"Last Snowstorm of the Year"	Sparhawk	2:16
9.	"John Prine"	Sparhawk	7:54
10.	"Little Argument with Myself"	Sparhawk	3:04
11.	"La La La Song"	Sparhawk, Parker, Gerry Beckley	3:25
12.	"Point of Disgust"	Parker, Sparhawk	3:25
13.	"Shots & Ladders"	Sparhawk, Parker	7:51
