= The Unexamined Life =

Studio album by Supreme Dicks
- Released: 1993
- Genre: Experimental rock, indie rock, noise rock, alternative rock, psychedelic rock
- Length: 63:46
- Label: Homestead

Supreme Dicks chronology
The Unexamined Life (1993)	Working Man's Dick (1994)

Professional ratings
Review scores
Source	Rating
Allmusic	2.5/5 stars

The Unexamined Life is the debut studio album by the band Supreme Dicks, released in 1993 through Homestead Records.

== Track listing ==
All tracks are written by Supreme Dicks.

No.	Title	Length
1.	"In a Sweet Song"	4:31
2.	"The Arabian Song"	4:31
3.	"The Sun's Bells"	5:35
4.	"Jack Smith"	3:39
5.	"That I May Never Forget and Stay"	2:25
6.	"Garden of Your Past"	2:40
7.	"Jack-O-Lantern"	3:25
8.	"River Song"	3:32
9.	"The Fallout Song"	4:18
10.	"Azure Dome"	5:03
11.	"The Forest Song or Especially When the October Wind With Frosty Fingers, Punishes My Hair"	5:26
12.	"Hyacinth Girls"	2:18
13.	"Ten Past Eleven"	4:23
14.	"Woody Would've Wanted It That Way"	2:15
15.	"Strange Song"	9:45

== Personnel ==
Supreme Dicks

- Mark Hanson – bass guitar, drums, vocals
- Daniel Oxenberg – guitar, vocals
- Steven Shavel – slide guitar, vocals
- Jon Shere – guitar, vocals
- Jim Spring – guitar

Production and additional personnel

- Lou Barlow – bass guitar on "Strange Song"
- Benjie Bernhardt – violin on "Ten Past Eleven"
- Rich Hinklin – engineering,
- Paul MacNamara – engineering
- Mark Merrigan – engineering, drums
- Pete Morgan – vocals on "Ten Past Eleven"
- Paul Roche – engineering
- Azalia Snail – photography
