= Vernon Yard Recordings =

- Parent company: Virgin Records
- Status: Defunct
- Country of origin: United Kingdom

Vernon Yard Recordings was an independent label owned by Virgin Records. Named after a small mews off the Portobello Road in Notting Hill, the label was known for its emphasis on modern psychedelic rock and its many subgenres, including shoegaze (The Verve), slowcore (Acetone and Low), and indie Britpop (The Auteurs).

== Distribution ==
Although Virgin owned a controlling interest in the label, they let Vernon Yard operate as a traditional indie (much like Virgin's relationship with Caroline Records), and therefore very few Vernon Yard releases were distributed by Virgin.

In fact, Vernon Yard used many different distributors throughout its run, primarily the aforementioned Caroline, but also competing major label Capitol Records and other willing distributors. The label had a strong relationship with Virgin's British indie, Hut Records, importing Hut bands into the US through its subsidiary Hut U.S.A., and sending Vernon Yard-signed acts over to the UK for release on Hut. In 1993, Keith Wood joined Vernon Yard from Caroline Records, leading the company as president.

By the end of 1996, the Vernon Yard label went bankrupt. Although the Vernon Yard label would still pop up occasionally up to the early 21st century, Virgin took greater control over the label in 1997, leading many key acts to leave the label. Virgin wanted to heavily promote the Verve's 1997 Urban Hymns and, as such, released the album on Virgin and not Vernon Yard. The label's other two most popular acts, Acetone and Low, left for Vapor Records and Kranky Records, respectively, around the same time. These moves effectively left Vernon Yard without its key artists, and only a handful of releases on Vernon Yard have appeared over the years. The most notable post-1997 release on Vernon Yard was the Low remix album OwL Remix.
