= Zak Sally =

American musician

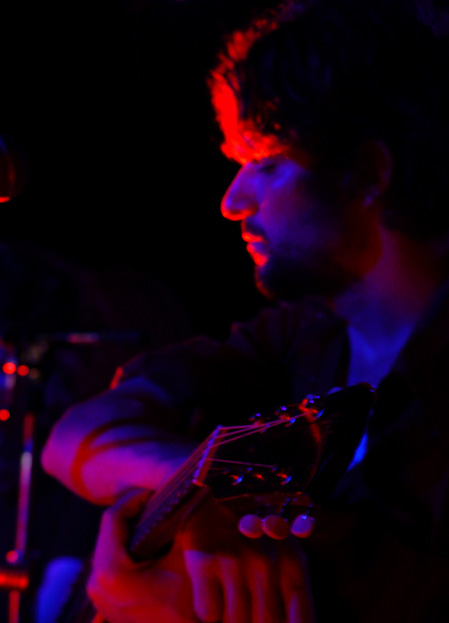
Sally playing with Low in 2004

Zak Sally is an American musician and comic artist.

He was the bass guitarist for the bands Low (1995 to 2004) and Enemymine (1998 to 2000) and is the singer and guitar player in The Hand. Sally is from Duluth, Minnesota, and owns and operates his own press, La Mano, in Minneapolis. La Mano serves as a publisher for Sally's works as well as those of other comic artists, including John Porcellino and William Schaff. Sally was also a comics art professor at the Minneapolis College of Art and Design.

The third volume of Sally's series Recidivist was nominated for two Eisner Awards in 2006. A Publishers Weekly review of his book Like a Dog described Sally's work as "richly dark, semiautobiographical, and tightly etched tales of tension and self-recrimination."

Sally created the cover art for Low's album The Great Destroyer. In 2009, he sold the original artwork on eBay to raise money to fund a new solo album. The album, Fear of Song, was released by La Mano in 2009. Ian Cohen of Pitchfork, reviewing the album, praised its lo-fi sensibility, calling it "wires-exposed and seams-showing, with an immediacy that pleasantly suggests the lot of it was freshly mastered about five minutes before it got put on disc."

== Works ==
- Like a Dog (2009), published by Fantagraphics Books (collects Recidivist #1–2 and more)
- Sammy the Mouse Vol. 1 (2007), published by Fantagraphics Books
- Sammy the Mouse Vol. 2 (2008), published by Uncivilized Books
- Mome (Fall 2006 and Fall 2007)
- Recidivist 3 (2006) and Recidivist IV (2015), published by La Mano

Professional ratings
Review scores
Source	Rating
Pitchfork	6/10 stars

== Discography ==
- Fear of Song (La Mano, 2009)

== In pop culture ==
- Sally appears as a character in Jeffrey Brown's autobiographical graphic-novel Little Things.
- While thought to be the subject of "Minneapolis" by That Dog, it's been confirmed he was not.
- Sally has a cameo in the movie Shopgirl, as a member of the band Hot Tears.
