= Slowcore =

Subgenre of indie rock with subdued sound

- Other names: Sadcore
- Stylistic origins: Indie rock; contemporary folk; folk rock; dream pop
- Cultural origins: 1980s, United States

Other topics
- Alternative rock; ambient; Americana; confessional poetry; drone; Gothic country; post-rock; shoegaze

Slowcore, (Note: Occasionally hyphenated as slow-core or spaced as slow core. Rarely, the genre will be spelled slocore.) also known as sadcore, is a subgenre of indie rock characterised by subdued tempos, minimalist instrumentation, and calm, sombre vocal performances. The genre began in the 1980s and 1990s, with several bands forming in reaction to the abrasive sounds of grunge. Slow rock music, with a pensive style inspired by genres such as singer-songwriter and folk, laid the groundwork for the genre in the early years.

In the mid-1990s, Low played a pivotal role in establishing slowcore as one of the era's microgenres; however, despite their retrospective acclamation as slowcore pioneers, Low was not the first band to produce slowcore. The influential group American Music Club formed in 1982, and Codeine, Red House Painters and Bedhead subsequently released influential albums in the 1990s. Regardless, the mellow and restrained sound of Low's debut album, I Could Live in Hope (1994), and their albums that followed over the next several years, came to define slowcore. Spain, Duster, and Ida, among others, all followed Low and furthered the reach of the genre, and by the 2000s, slowcore had a defined sound, even if it continued to lack obvious categorisation. Acts like Carissa's Wierd, Jason Molina, and Duster engaged with its archetypical sound in their music throughout the introductory years of the 21st century, while others, including Hope Sandoval & the Warm Inventions, Grouper, and Sun Kil Moon, introduced broader sounds but remained within the genre.

The term "slowcore" derives from "slow", referring to the tempo and energy of the music, and "-core", which refers to a scene, style, or musical subgenre. "Sadcore" imitates similar etymology, and the names are used interchangeably. The term itself has an unclear origin, though sources suggest the use of "slowcore" started in the early 1990s. Scholars and bands alike have shown ambivalence towards the name, with some deeming it pejorative.

== Characteristics ==
"Lullaby"
"Lullaby" by Low from their 1994 debut album I Could Live in Hope. The album is considered a foundational slowcore record. The song's sound has been described as "stretch[ing] a simple melody into a 10-minute meditation that gently pulls [the listener] out of linear time".

Slowcore prominently incorporates stylings and traits from indie rock and contemporary folk music. Indie rock is a broad subgenre of rock music that emerged in the 1980s and encapsulates music released independently or through low-budget record labels that typically does not pertain to the musical interests of mainstream audiences. Similarly, contemporary folk refers to a musical style representative of traditional folk music but with modern—the 20th century and onwards—interpretations, ultimately spawning subgenres like folk rock and indie folk in the later stages of the century, both of which influenced slowcore to different extents. Alongside these core influences, artists often take influence from a variety of other musical genres, including alternative rock, Americana, dream pop, post-rock, and shoegaze. Drone and ambient music are also cited as being similar.

There is no definitive characterisation of the genre, however it is typically defined by slow tempos and a sombre and atmospheric approach to both the songwriting and composition. Backing instrumentation is sparse, contrasting with the genres from which slowcore is derived. Slowcore uses simple melodies over a prolonged period to evoke saddening emotions; Andrea Swensson of Pitchfork wrote that the genre "gently pulls [the listener] out of linear time". While the songs can implement choruses, they often lack intense changes in instrumentation. Chris Brokaw of Codeine facetiously remarked that he could "play a snare hit, go get a drink and be back at the drumkit before the next beat". In 1998, SF Weekly wrote that "The best thing about slowcore [...] is that they demand the listener pay attention. The worst thing about them is that sometimes you fall asleep by the third song".

Lyrics in slowcore songs are often melancholic and descriptively plain, with the vocal performances being calm and subdued, sometimes having a lulling effect. For example, Swedish singer Stina Nordenstam has been described as slowcore because of "her sadly beautiful little-girl whisper" style of singing. Emotion is a core component of slowcore, and the sparse instrumentation emphasises the singer's voice. Stuart Braithwaite, a founding member of the renowned post-rock band Mogwai, said "You weren't going to play [slowcore] at parties, but it was beautiful: the lyrics bare and honest, the musicality sparing".

== Etymology ==
Within music, the suffix -core infers a scene or style, originating with hardcore. The American Dialect Society describes it more generally as a "productive suffix for aesthetic trends". "Slow" simply refers to the pace of the music. For "sadcore", the same applies, except "sad" refers to the emotion of the lyrics.

There is no definitive origin of the label "slowcore" outside of the agreement between scholars that its use began in the 1990s. The first instance of "slowcore" cited in the Oxford English Dictionary is from 1991: Chuck Eddy's book Stairway to Hell: The 500 Best Heavy Metal Albums in the Universe. Another claim to the origin of the term is from Alan Sparhawk of Low, a band often considered monumental in the growth of the genre. In an interview with The Paper Crane podcast, Sparhawk said that a friend of his had coined the term "slowcore" as a joke and that he had humorously mentioned it in one of his band's earliest shows (c. 1993). He also said that after he used it in an interview, he suspected that the popularity of the term had increased, as did Low's media coverage.

Journalists dubbed this genre "slowcore", much to the musicians' chagrin. "It was an insult," says Bedhead's Matt Kadane. "We never saw slowness as the essence of what we were doing."

— Stevie Chick, The Guardian

The "slowcore" label has been criticised by scholars and bands, who have called it pejorative. Matt Kadane of Bedhead called it an "insult" and Jim Putnam of Radar Bros. resisted the term and repeatedly informed music journalists that his band was "not slowcore". Similarly, members of Low disliked the label: in 1998, Sparhawk called it "cheesy". Regardless, the term became increasingly popular and in an interview with Vice in 2018, Sparhawk recognised his band as being influential in slowcore's growth and success.

== Sadcore ==
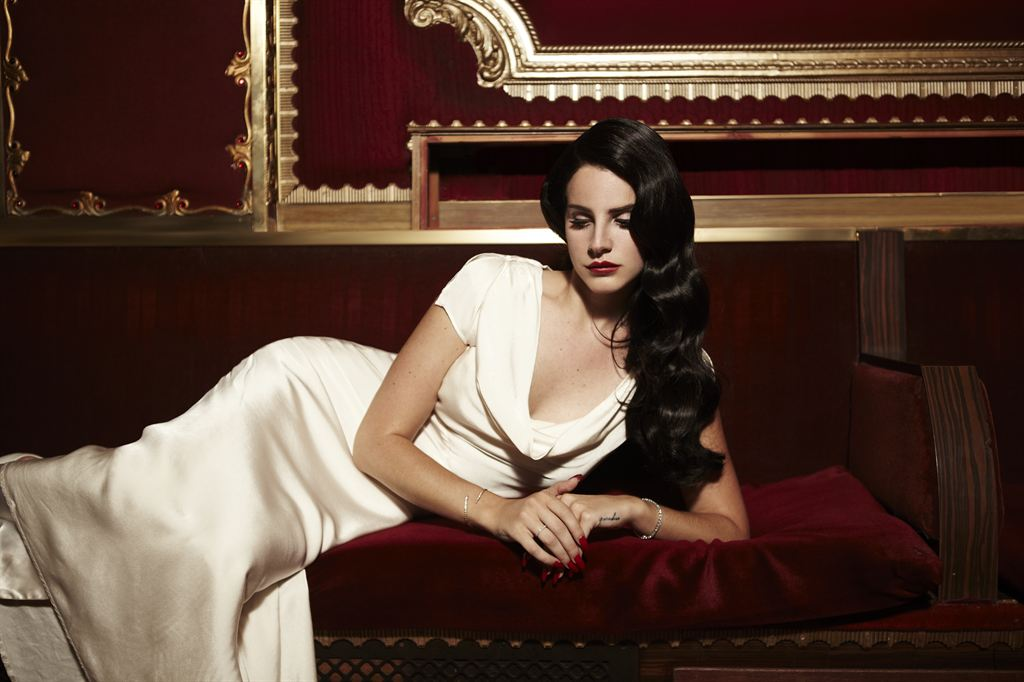
Lana Del Rey, pictured in 2013, has self-described her music as "Hollywood sadcore".

The term "sadcore" emerged contemporaneously with slowcore, and a variety of sources consider these neologisms to be synonymous. When distinguished, the differences are attributed to a heightened melancholy and realism in the lyrics of sadcore songs, with a pronounced poetic influence, especially from confessional poets like Sylvia Plath.

Sadcore saw considerable reception in the early 2000s. For instance, The Washington Post dubbed Mark Eitzel, the lead singer of American Music Club, the "reluctant king of sadcore" in 2002 and LA Weekly called Charlyn Marshall (stage name Cat Power) the "Queen of Sadcore" in 2003. Reviewers also used it in passing for the music of Red House Painters, Shearwater, and Low. Since then, Lana Del Rey described her own music as "Hollywood sadcore" in an interview with Vogue in 2011. Despite an association with the genre, Phoebe Bridgers has said "I hate the 'sad girl' label".

== History ==
=== Late 1980s: Stylistic origins ===
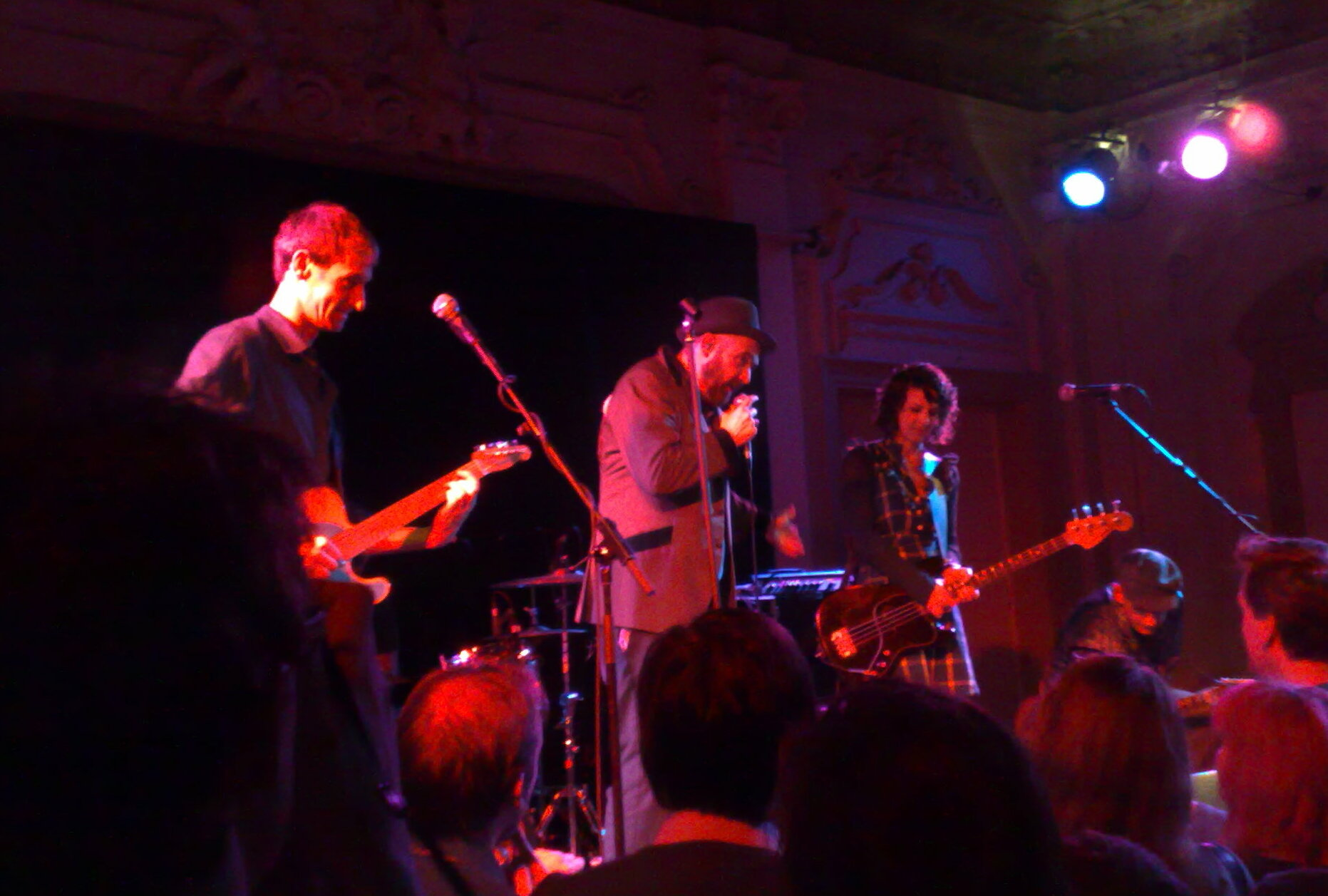
American Music Club performing at Bush Hall in 2008. They are considered to be one of the earliest slowcore bands.

The sound that would become known as "slowcore" began emerging in the United States in the late 1980s and early 1990s as a counterpoint to the rapid growth of louder rock genres, especially grunge. Grunge fused elements of punk rock and heavy metal to create a scene which Bruce Pavitt, co-founder of the record label Sub Pop, described as "gritty vocals, roaring Marshall amps, ultra-loose grunge that destroyed the morals of a generation". Grunge, in the form that it came to be known, emerged during the mid-1980s in and around Seattle, Washington, though unlike grunge, the early years of slowcore did not have a defined scene or any geographic hotspots.

American Music Club, hailing from San Francisco, California, are considered an early slowcore band. Releasing their debut album The Restless Stranger in 1985, the band's music was slow and with characteristics akin to genres like folk and singer-songwriter. This style was echoed by other bands at the time, such as the Canadian Cowboy Junkies, who were creating minimalist country and blues, and would come to define aspects of slowcore. Within the same period of time, Galaxie 500 formed in Cambridge, Massachusetts, influenced by the music of the Velvet Underground, the Modern Lovers, Big Star and Spacemen 3 they began releasing dream pop albums. Their sophomore album, On Fire (1989), strongly influenced the genre, as did the rest of their discography, although their dream pop style was not entirely indicative of how slowcore would develop. Regardless, the band is frequently cited as one of slowcore's leading antecedents. Andrew Earles, in his 2014 book Gimme Indie Rock: 500 Essential American Underground Rock Albums 1981-1996, described them as slowcore's "progenitor". Robert Rubsam, writing for Bandcamp Daily, called Galaxie 500 the "fountainhead for all that would come".

The 1980s also saw the formation of other bands that would help define slowcore, although many did not release any material until the 1990s. These include Codeine, Red House Painters, and Mazzy Star.

=== 1990s: Peak growth and evolution ===
While many of the bands that influenced the concept of slowcore existed before the 1990s, this decade is often cited as being when the genre began, as well as being its heyday. Throughout this period, the amount of bands and albums associated with the genre grew greatly, establishing its fundamental sound and style.

Codeine are considered to be one of the first slowcore bands. They are pictured here performing at Alexandra Palace during their 2012 reunion tour.

In these early years, the genre was defined by bands that had a style of minimalist and prolonged instrumentation with melancholic vocal performances. Codeine, having formed in 1989, released Frigid Stars LP in 1990, which incorporated "tortured lyrics and tired vocal melodies". Codeine's music received attention over the following years, and after the release of the Barely Real extended play in 1992, the Toronto Star described them as having a "unique 'slowcore' sound". By The White Birch, their 1994 sophomore and ultimate album, Codeine had cemented themselves as a prominent band within the scene. Two years after Codeine's debut, Red House Painters, having formed in 1988, released their debut album: Down Colorful Hill (1992). Similar to other bands on the 4AD label, this album consisted of a select handful of demos that had been polished before their official release. The album is bleak in both lyrics and composition; Down Colorful Hill, alongside their following albums Rollercoaster (1993) and Bridge (1993), have been described as instilling feelings of "desperation, regret, and general darkness". Earles contended that Red House Painters was the saddest band within slowcore in the early 1990s.

Another early band was Bedhead, which formed in 1991 and released WhatFunLifeWas, their debut album, in 1994. This album consisted of soft vocals and dynamic instrumentation, and the band would release two further studio albums, Beheaded (1996) and Transaction de Novo (1998), which maintained the same slow sound as their debut but deviated in technique. After this, the band disbanded and fell out of public discourse. A year after Bedhead's formation, Idaho, another prominent band in these preliminary years, formed, and started to release music in 1993 after signing with Caroline Records. Like Bedhead, they released slowcore albums throughout the decade—their debut being Year After Year (1993); however, Idaho persisted into the next century.

==== 1994–1999: Refinement of an archetypical sound ====
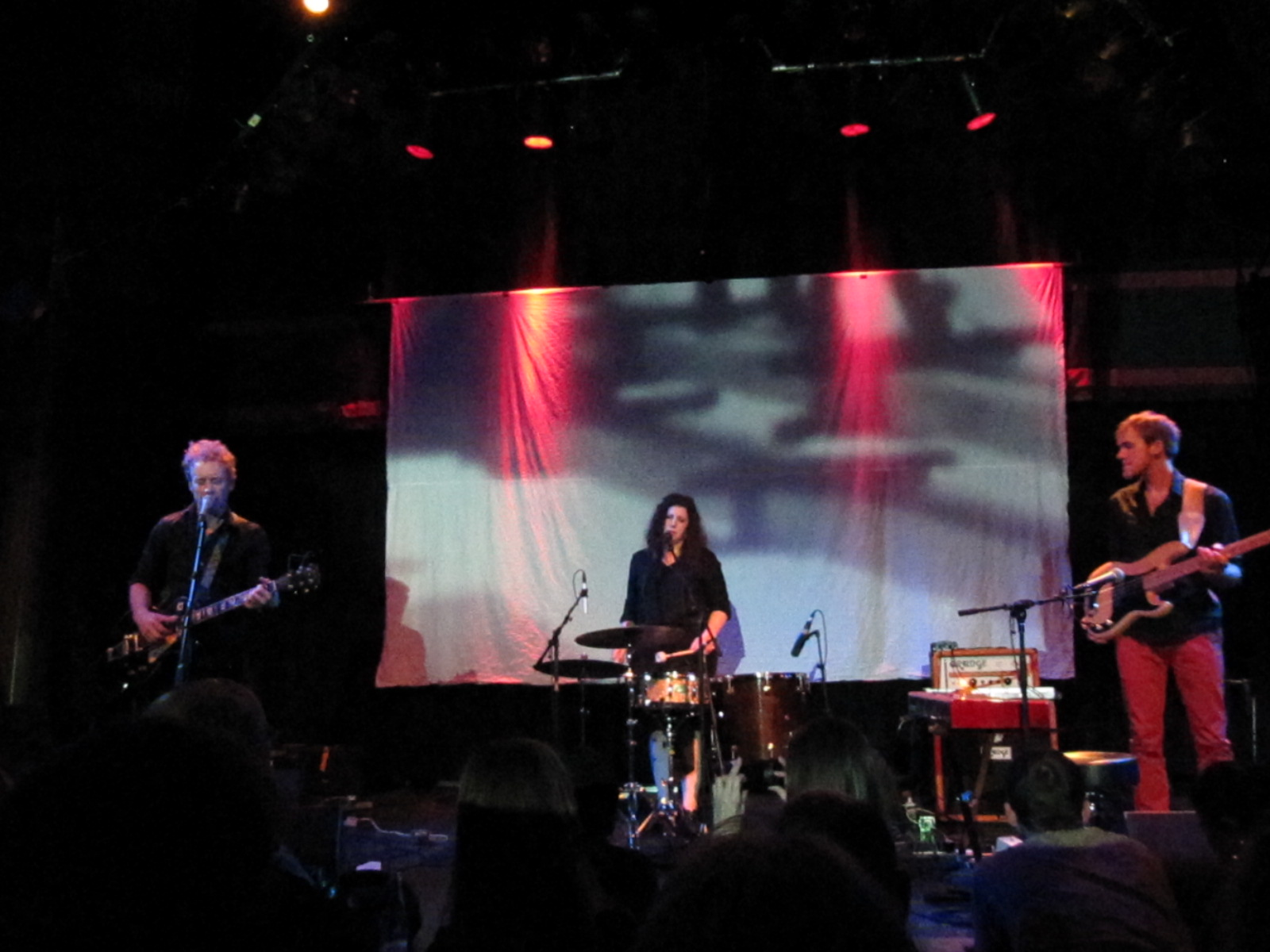
Low, pictured in 2013, are heralded as pioneers of slowcore with their early releases.

The mid-1990s were an experimental period in music throughout North America and Europe, with new microgenres rapidly appearing in indie music. Other bands, such as the Velvet Underground-influenced (similar to Galaxie 500) acts Acetone and the American Analog Set, and the comparatively darker bands Slint and Swans, were producing slow songs that could be categorized as slowcore but could also be deemed post-rock. This resulted in critics finding slowcore to be unclearly defined.

Low, hailing from Duluth, Minnesota, would ultimately create the genre's archetypical sound. Formed in 1993 by Alan Sparhawk and Mimi Parker, the band started by experimenting with slow and quiet rock music and in December 1994, released their debut album I Could Live in Hope. This album was different from its predecessors: while it maintained stylistic similarities with other bands' sparse instrumentation, it was more difficult to categorise into the other associated genres, like dream pop or shoegaze. Due to this unique sound, Low are heralded as pioneers of the genre; in their review of Trust (2002), Brad Haywood of Pitchfork proclaimed I Could Live in Hope and Long Division (1995) "drew the blueprint for slowcore as we know it today". Low would continue to release slowcore albums throughout the rest of the decade and the early 2000s, after which they transitioned towards other genres.

Following Low, several bands emerged. Among them was Ida, composed of Elizabeth Mitchell and Daniel Littleton, who released their debut album, Tales of Brave Ida in 1994. This was followed by I Know About You in 1996, which Rubsam considered a slowcore "classic". Ida continued to release music throughout the 1990s and into the late 2000s, with Heart Like a River from 2005 also often highlighted as an exemplary slowcore album. Bluetile Lounge, an Australian band, released their debut album (Lowercase) a year after Ida's debut, in 1995. Also in 1995, Spain and Cat Power released their debut albums: The Blue Moods of Spain and Dear Sir, respectively. The For Carnation released their debut EP, Fight Songs the same year. Two years later, Radar Bros.'s self-titled debut album was released. These latter four bands were mentioned by Stevie Chick as examples of the way slowcore evolved after Low in an article for The Guardian. She writes, in respect of the first three: "the genre grew to encompass the blue lullabies of Spain; the hypnotic intimacy of the For Carnation [...]; [and] the whispered confessions of early Cat Power". She also cites Rex, which included Codeine's Doug Scharin, and the Austin-based Knife in the Water as influential acts in the genre's expansion. Led by Aaron Blount, Knife in the Water's sound was frequently described as "noir-folk," utilizing the "negative space" of slowcore to create cinematic, tense narratives. By the years surrounding 1996, "slowcore" was no longer solely an esoteric phrase; an article in The Sydney Morning Herald in May jested that Spain, among others, were playing a sort of music that "new-trend-every-week folk are calling slowcore". Singer-songwriters like the American singer Lisa Germano and the Swedish singer Stina Nordenstam released albums exploring slowcore, respectively Geek the Girl and Dynamite, while the comparatively more mainstream act the Smashing Pumpkins would engage with slowcore stylings in various songs.

Nearing the end of the decade, Duster released Stratosphere (1998). By this point, the band had already released a few EPs but had failed to garner a notable reputation. The album was reviewed by Pitchfork and other zines, and the band would release one final album, Contemporary Movement (2000), before disbanding until 2018. Despite this, Duster's initial cult following and later resurgence would ultimately make them one of the most influential bands within slowcore.

=== 2000s–2010s: Proliferation ===
Whereas subcultures like emo and NYHC became ever-more constricting over time, [slowcore] began with a specific set of goals and expanded outward. Perhaps because slowcore was always more about a feeling and less a particular set of sonic parameters, it was always more open to interpretation than some of its fellow spawn of the underground.

— Robert Rubsam, Bandcamp Daily

Through the success of several bands in the mid-to-late 1990s, the slowcore sound had been conceptually established by the commencement of the 2000s. Through this, the genre continued to grow with releases from both existing and new artists. This era also saw bands experiment by amalgamating the slowcore sound with other genres.

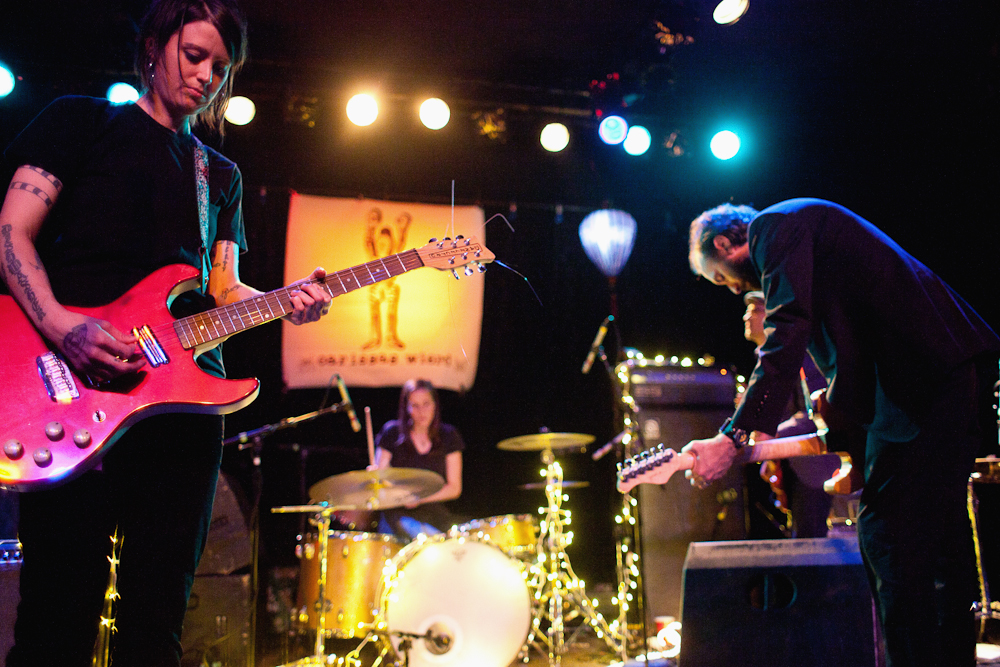
Carissa's Wierd at a reunion show in 2010. Commentators have used this band as an example of how slowcore continued into the 2000s.

The first few years of the century saw multiple bands release staple slowcore albums, including Duster's Contemporary Movement, Low's Things We Lost in the Fire (2001) and Trust, and Jason Molina, with Songs: Ohia (later called Magnolia Electric Co.), releasing Ghost Tropic (2000), Didn't It Rain (2002), and The Magnolia Electric Co. (2003). Alongside these, new bands began venturing into the genre. Carissa's Wierd, having formed in 1995, did not release anything until the turn of the century, when they put out Ugly But Honest: 1996-1999 (2000), followed a year later by You Should Be at Home Here (2001). These albums were then succeeded in 2002 by Songs About Leaving, the band's final album. This lattermost release was their most notable with respect to slowcore. Despite this, Carissa's Wierd remained obscure throughout their existence, disbanding in 2003.

While albums archetypical of the mid-to-late-1990s slowcore sound were still being released during the 2000s—such as those by Carissa's Wierd and Low—some bands were experimenting with introducing slowcore elements to other genres. For example, in 2002, several Red House Painters members formed Sun Kil Moon. Early on, pundits noted that this band departed from the slowcore sound present in Red House Painters releases to instead opt for folk-inspired song construction. Despite this, others continued to find similarities between Sun Kil Moon's music and slowcore: a 2009 article in The Sunday Times listed April (2008) as an essential slowcore record. Like Sun Kil Moon, Hope Sandoval & the Warm Inventions comprised members of other bands. Hope Sandoval of Mazzy Star and Colm Ó Cíosóig of the shoegaze pioneering My Bloody Valentine formed this duo in 2001, and shortly after, released Bavarian Fruit Bread (2001). The album was reminiscent of dream pop, given the members' past work with other bands, but was still recognisable as slowcore. This trend continued with their second album, Through the Devil Softly (2009). This dream pop sound was revisited by Cigarettes After Sex in 2012, with their single "Nothing's Gonna Hurt You Baby". The song would go relatively unnoticed until it went viral several years later, following which the band released their self-titled debut album in 2017, described by Pitchfork as a "slowcore collection [that] borders on ambient".

=== 2020s: Resurgence ===
Slowcore increased in popularity in the early 2020s, partly through social media trends. Songs like Duster's "Constellations" (from Stratosphere) have been used to soundtrack viral videos to heighten emotion. Similarly, televisions programs used slowcore to similar effect; the Netflix drama series 13 Reasons Why featured Codeine's cover of Joy Division's "Atmosphere". Together, this usage increased public interest in slowcore, and its newfound growth allowed existing bands—like Duster—to receive a resurgence in success and enabled new bands to emerge onto the scene. Rubsam listed Planning for Burial, Grouper, Kowloon Walled City, and Worm Ouroboros as examples of "post-slow" bands in his timeline of slowcore, a category "reflecting a broadening and a deepening of the sound". Chick stated the "genre's influence is subtle but pervasive" in modern music. Reviewers have described and labeled releases from contemporary singer-songwriters as slowcore, including those of Nicole Dollanganger, Ethel Cain, Daughter, Snail Mail, and Liam McCay.

== Notes and citations ==
=== Bibliography ===
==== Books ====
- Crystal, David (2014). Words in Time and Place: Exploring Language Through the Historical Thesaurus of the Oxford English Dictionary. Oxford University Press. ISBN 9780199680474.
- Earles, Andrew (2014). Gimme Indie Rock: 500 Essential American Underground Rock Albums 1981-1996. Voyageur Press. ISBN 9781627883795.
- Eddy, Chuck (1991). Stairway to Hell: The 500 Best Heavy Metal Albums in the Universe (1st ed.). Harmony Books. ISBN 9780517575413.
- Fox, Dominic (2009). Cold World: The Aesthetics of Dejection and the Politics of Militant Dysphoria. Hampshire, England: John Hunt Publishing. ISBN 9781846942174.
- Grønstad, Asbjørn Skarsvåg (2020). Rethinking Art and Visual Culture: The Poetics of Opacity. Bergen, Norway: Palgrave Macmillan. doi:10.1007/978-3-030-46176-8. ISBN 9783030461768. S2CID 229229535.
- Metzer, David (2017). The Ballad in American Popular Music: From Elvis to Beyoncé. Cambridge University Press. doi:10.1017/9781316676400. ISBN 9781316676400.
- Petrusich, Amanda (2008). It Still Moves: Lost Songs, Lost Highways, and the Search for the Next American Music. Faber & Faber. ISBN 9780865479500.
- R. Ferris, William; L. Hart, Mary (2010). Folk Music and Modern Sound. University Press of Mississippi. ISBN 9781617030994.
- Stewart, Allison (2004). Brackett, Nathan; Hoard, Christian (eds.). The New Rolling Stone Album Guide (4th ed.). Simon & Schuster. ISBN 0743201698.
- Sweers, Britta (2005). Electric Folk: The Changing Face of English Traditional Music. Oxford University Press. ISBN 9780198038986.

==== Journal articles ====
- Arsel, Zeynep; Thompson, Craig J. (2011). "Demythologizing Consumption Practices: How Consumers Protect Their Field-Dependent Identity Investments from Devaluing Marketplace Myths". Journal of Consumer Research. 37 (5): 791–806. doi:10.1086/656389. JSTOR 10.1086/656389.
- Rogers, Ian (2008). "'You've got to go to gigs to get gigs': Indie musicians, eclecticism and the Brisbane scene". Continuum. 22 (5): 639–649. doi:10.1080/10304310802311618. S2CID 144566463 – via Taylor & Francis.

==== Newspaper articles and magazine excerpts ====
- Cairns, Dan (27 May 2001). "Almost famous for 15 minutes". The Sunday Times. London, United Kingdom. ISSN 0319-0714 – via Gale.
- Casimir, Jon (30 May 1996). "Spain, a band on another planet". The Sydney Morning Herald. Sydney, New South Wales, Australia. ISSN 0312-6315. ProQuest 2527331742.
- Clayton, Richard; Cairns, Dan; Nash, Rob; Edwards, Mark (11 January 2009). "Your definitive guide to today's music scene". The Sunday Times. London. p. 26. ISSN 0956-1382. ProQuest 316466056.
- Dafoe, Chris (20 July 1988). "Pop Notes: Future of Parachute Club is up in the air". The Globe and Mail. Toronto, Ontario. ISSN 0319-0714. ProQuest 385888341.
- Griffin, John (24 March 1988). "Little-known Junkies' remarkable LP a find". The Gazette. Montreal, Quebec, Canada. ISSN 0384-1294. ProQuest 431601921.
- Punter, Jennie (11 November 1993). "Codeine trio feeling no pain with unique 'slowcore' sound". Toronto Star. Toronto, Ontario. ISSN 0319-0781. ProQuest 436938278.
- Schoemer, Karen (1 February 1989). "American Music Club". Spin. Vol. 4, no. 11. New York City, New York. pp. 66–67. ProQuest 1438700005.
