= Banks discography =

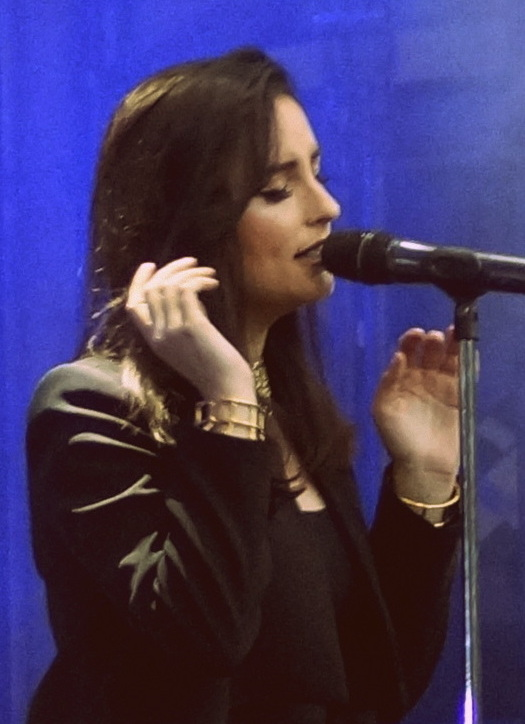
- Banks performing at Lollapalooza 2015
- Studio albums: 5
- EPs: 3
- Singles: 21
- Music videos: 16
- Remix album: 1
- Promotional singles: 2

American singer Banks has released five studio albums, one remix album, three extended plays, twenty-one singles, two promotional singles and sixteen music videos.

== Albums ==
=== Studio albums ===
List of studio albums, with selected chart positions, sales figures and certifications
Title	Details	Peak chart positions										Sales	Certifications
Title	Details	US	AUS	BEL (FL)	CAN	FRA	GER	NL	NZ	SWI	UK	Sales	Certifications
Goddess	Released: September 5, 2014; Label: Harvest, Good Years; Formats: CD, LP, digital download	12	17	37	8	70	18	75	18	12	20	US: 120,000	RIAA: Gold; BPI: Silver
The Altar	Released: September 30, 2016; Label: Harvest; Formats: CD, LP, digital download	17	8	44	12	118	56	77	18	38	24		
III	Released: July 12, 2019; Label: Capitol, Harvest; Formats: CD, LP, digital download	21	25	113	7	185	60	—	—	41	57		
Serpentina	Released: April 8, 2022; Label: AWAL; Formats: LP, digital download	— (Note: Serpentina did not enter the Billboard 200, but peaked at number 80 on the Top Current Album Sales chart.)	—	—	—	—	—	—	—	—	— (Note: Serpentina did not enter the UK Albums Chart, but peaked at number 39 on the UK Album Downloads Chart.)		
Off with Her Head	Released: February 28, 2025; Label: ADA; Formats: CD, LP, digital download	—	—	—	—	—	—	—	—	—	— (Note: Off with Her Head did not enter the UK Albums chart, but peaked at number 88 on the UK Album Downloads Chart.)		
"—" denotes an album that did not chart or was not released in that territory.

=== Remix albums ===
Title	Details
Goddess Remixes	Released: March 23, 2015; Label: Harvest; Format: Digital download

== Extended plays ==
List of extended plays, with selected chart positions
Title	Details	Peak
Title	Details	US Heat.
Fall Over	Released: March 4, 2013; Label: Good Years; Format: Digital download	—
London	Released: September 10, 2013; Label: Harvest, Good Years; Formats: CD, 12-inch vinyl, digital download	6
Live and Stripped	Released: April 3, 2020; Label: Harvest; Format: Digital download	—
"—" denotes a recording that did not chart or was not released in that territory.

== Singles ==
List of singles as lead artist, with selected chart positions and certifications, showing year released and album name
Title	Year	Peak chart positions										Certifications	Album
Title	Year	US Bub.	US Adult	US Rock	AUS	BEL (FL) Tip	CAN Rock	CZR	GER	NZ Hot	UK Indie Break.	Certifications	Album
"Fall Over"	2013	—	—	—	—	—	—	—	—	—	—		Fall Over and Goddess
"Warm Water"	2013	—	—	—	—	—	—	—	—	—	13		Goddess
"Brain"	2014	—	—	—	—	—	—	—	—	—	—		Goddess
"Drowning"	2014	—	—	— (Note: "Drowning" did not enter the Hot Rock & Alternative Songs chart, but peaked at number 48 on the Rock Digital Song Sales chart.)	—	35	—	—	—	—	—		Goddess
"Beggin for Thread"	2014	16	8	— (Note: "Beggin for Thread" did not enter the Hot Rock & Alternative Songs chart, but peaked at number 14 on the Rock & Alternative Airplay chart.)	80	—	36	51	64	—	—	RMNZ: Gold; RIAA: Platinum	Goddess
"Better"	2015	—	—	39	112	—	—	—	—	—	—		Non-album single
"Fuck with Myself"	2016	—	—	29	—	—	—	—	—	— (Note: "Fuck with Myself" did not enter the NZ Top 40 Singles Chart or Hot Singles Chart, but peaked at number eight on the NZ Heatseeker Singles Chart.)	—		The Altar
"Gemini Feed"	2016	—	—	25	86	— (Note: "Gemini Feed" did not enter the Flanders Ultratop 50, but charted as an "extra tip" on the Ultratip chart.)	—	—	—	— (Note: "Gemini Feed" did not enter the NZ Top 40 Singles Chart or Hot Singles Chart, but peaked at number four on the NZ Heatseeker Singles Chart.)	—		The Altar
"Mind Games"	2016	—	—	— (Note: "Mind Games" did not enter the Hot Rock & Alternative Songs chart, but peaked at number 16 on the Alternative Digital Song Sales chart.)	—	—	—	—	—	—	—		The Altar
"To the Hilt"	2016	—	—	—	—	—	—	—	—	—	—		The Altar
"Crowded Places"	2017	—	—	— (Note: "Crowded Places" did not enter the Hot Rock & Alternative Songs chart, but peaked at number 12 on the Alternative Digital Song Sales chart.)	—	—	—	—	—	—	—		Non-album singles
"Underdog"	2017	—	—	—	— (Note: "Underdog" did not enter the Australian ARIA Singles Chart but peaked at number 13 on the ARIA Hitseekers Chart.)	—	—	—	—	— (Note: "Underdog" did not enter the NZ Top 40 Singles Chart or Hot Singles Chart, but peaked at number eight on the NZ Heatseeker Singles Chart.)	—		Non-album singles
"Gimme"	2019	—	—	—	—	— (Note: "Gimme" did not enter the Flanders Ultratop 50, but charted as an "extra tip" on the Ultratip chart.)	—	—	—	31	—		III
"Look What You're Doing to Me" (featuring Francis and the Lights)	2019	—	—	—	—	—	—	—	—	—	—		III
"Contaminated"	2019	—	—	—	—	—	—	—	—	30	—		III
"The Devil"	2021	—	—	—	—	—	—	—	—	—	—		Serpentina
"Skinnydipped"	2021	—	—	—	—	—	—	—	—	—	—		Serpentina
"Holding Back"	2022	—	—	—	—	—	—	—	—	—	—		Serpentina
"I Still Love You"	2022	—	—	—	—	—	—	—	—	—	—		Serpentina
"Meteorite"	2022	—	—	—	—	—	—	—	—	—	—		Serpentina
"Deadend"	2022	—	—	—	—	—	—	—	—	—	—		Serpentina
"Sad Girl Music" (with Kito)	2022	—	—	—	—	—	—	—	—	—	—		Non-album single
"I Hate Your Ex-Girlfriend" (featuring Doechii)	2024	—	—	—	—	—	—	—	—	—	—		Off with Her Head
"Best Friends"	2024	—	—	—	—	—	—	—	—	—	—		Off with Her Head
"Love Is Unkind"	2025	—	—	—	—	—	—	—	—	—	—		Off with Her Head
"Teardrop"	2025	—	—	—	—	—	—	—	—	—	—		Non-album single
"—" denotes a recording that did not chart or was not released in that territory.

=== Promotional singles ===
Title	Year	Album
"Change"	2014	Goddess
"Alibi"	2014	Goddess

== Other charted songs ==
List of other charted songs, with selected chart positions, showing year released and album name
Title	Year	Peaks				Certifications	Album
Title	Year	US Alt. Dig.	US Dance	BEL (FL) Tip	UK	Certifications	Album
"Waiting Game"	2013	16	—	34	99	RIAA: Gold	London
"1998" (Chet Faker featuring Banks)	2015	—	31	—	—		Non-album song
"Trainwreck"	2016	—	—	— (Note: "Trainwreck" did not enter the Flanders Ultratop 50, but charted as an "extra tip" on the Ultratip chart.)	—		The Altar
"—" denotes a recording that did not chart or was not released in that territory.

== Guest appearances ==
List of non-single guest appearances, with other performing artists, showing year released and album name
Title	Year	Other artist(s)	Album
"Don't You Love"	2014	Lil Silva	Mabel
"Right for You"	2014	Lil Silva	Mabel
"Wolfpack"	2015	TĀLĀ	Malika
"In Between"	2017	6lack	Free 6lack
"Bait"	2023	Kim Petras	Feed the Beast

== Music videos ==
List of music videos, showing year released and directors
Title	Year	Director	Ref.
"Work" (with Lil Silva)	2013	Ryan Andrews	
"Fall Over"	2013	Dylan Knight	
"Warm Water"	2013	Dylan Knight	
"Waiting Game"	2013	Francesco Carrozzini	
"This Is What It Feels Like"	2013	Ellis Bahl	
"Brain"	2014	Barnaby Roper	
"Drowning"	2014	Mike Piscitelli	
"Beggin for Thread"	2014	Barnaby Roper	
"Better"	2015	James Mountford Studio	
"Fuck with Myself"	2016	Philippa Price	
"Gemini Feed"	2016	Philippa Price	
"Trainwreck"	2017	Marie Schuller	
"Gimme"	2019	Matty Peacock	
"The Devil"	2021	Banks and Jenna Marsh	
"Skinnydipped"	2021	Banks and Michael Stine	
"I Still Love You"	2022	Banks and James Mountford	
