= The Altar Tour =

2017 concert tour by Banks

- Tour by Banks
- Associated album: The Altar
- Start date: 24 February 2017
- End date: 16 November 2017
- No. of shows: 20 in Europe; 42 in North America; 6 in Oceania; 68 in total

Banks concert chronology
- The Goddess Tour (2014–2015); The Altar Tour (2017); The III Tour (2019)

The Altar Tour is the second official headlining concert tour by American musician Banks. It is in support of her second studio album The Altar (2016). The tour began on February 24, 2017, in Antwerp, Belgium and concluded on November 3, 2017, in Rotterdam, Netherlands.

== Background ==
On September 19, 2016, 11 days before the release of The Altar, Banks announced the first leg of dates. They consisted of 11 tour dates across Europe. On January 18, 2017, Banks announced the first batch of North American tour dates, and on February 28, 2017, even more North American dates were announced. Tour dates for various music festivals across North America as well as Australian and Asian dates were announced at later times. On May 22, 2017, Banks announced a second date of European dates that will take place in October and November 2017. On June 1, 2017, it was announced that the Asian leg of the tour was cancelled due to unknown unforeseen circumstances. On June 6, 2017, Banks announced another leg of North American concerts that took place from July to September 2017.

== Set list ==
This set list is representative of the show on March 8, 2017, in Paris, France. It does not represent all dates throughout the tour.

1. "Poltergeist"
2. "Fuck with Myself"
3. "Gemini Feed"
4. "Trainwreck"
5. "Waiting Game"
6. "This Is What It Feels Like"
7. "Mind Games"
8. "Better"
9. "Weaker Girl"
10. "Mother Earth"
11. "Drowning"
12. "Judas"
13. "Beggin for Thread"
14. "Haunt"
15. "27 Hours"
16. "This Is Not About Us"

== Tour dates ==
List of concerts, showing date, city, country, venue, and opening acts.
Date	City	Country	Venue
Europe
February 24, 2017	Antwerp	Belgium	TRIX Muziekcentrum
February 25, 2017	Hamburg	Germany	Gruenspan
February 27, 2017	Copenhagen	Denmark	Vega
February 28, 2017	Stockholm	Sweden	Nalen
March 3, 2017	Berlin	Germany	Heimathafen Neukölln
March 5, 2017	Cologne	Germany	Gloria-Theater
March 6, 2017	Amsterdam	Netherlands	Paradiso
March 8, 2017	Paris	France	La Cigale
March 10, 2017	Manchester	England	Albert Hall
March 11, 2017	Glasgow	Scotland	The O_{2} ABC
March 13, 2017	London	England	Roundhouse
North America
March 15, 2017 (Note: The March 15, 2017 show is part of COLLiDE at Bar 96 Presented by TWIX.)	Austin	United States	Bar 96
March 16, 2017 (Note: The March 16, 2017 show is part of StubHub LIVE – 2017 SXSW Showcase.)	Austin	United States	Banger's Sausage House
April 11, 2017	Pomona	United States	Fox Theater Pomona
April 13, 2017	San Diego	United States	Humphrey's Concerts By the Bay
April 14, 2017 (Note: The April 14, 2017 show is part of the Coachella Valley Music and Arts Festival 2017.)	Indio	United States	Empire Polo Club
April 16, 2017	Portland	United States	Crystal Ballroom
April 17, 2017	Vancouver	Canada	Vogue Theatre
April 18, 2017	Seattle	United States	Showbox SoDo
April 20, 2017	San Francisco	United States	The Warfield
April 21, 2017 (Note: The April 21, 2017 show is part of the Coachella Valley Music and Arts Festival 2017.)	Indio	United States	Empire Polo Club
June 2, 2017	Philadelphia	United States	Electric Factory
June 3, 2017 (Note: The June 3, 2017 show is part of the Governors Ball Music Festival 2017.)	New York City	United States	Randalls and Wards Islands
June 5, 2017	Montreal	Canada	Métropolis
June 6, 2017	Boston	United States	Royale Nightclub
June 7, 2017	Washington, D.C.	United States	9:30 Club
June 9, 2017	Charlotte	United States	The Fillmore Charlotte
June 10, 2017	Atlanta	United States	Buckhead Theatre
June 12, 2017	Nashville	United States	Marathon Music Works
June 13, 2017	Asheville	United States	The Orange Peel
June 16, 2017 (Note: The June 16, 2017 show is part of the Firefly Music Festival 2017.)	Dover	United States	Dover International Speedway
June 17, 2017	Pittsburgh	United States	Stage AE
June 19, 2017	Cleveland	United States	Agora Theatre and Ballroom
June 20, 2017	Columbus	United States	Newport Music Hall
June 22, 2017 (Note: The June 22, 2017 show is part of the Electric Forest Festival 2017. It is still to be determined which date Banks will be performing on.)	Rothbury	United States	Double JJ Resort
Oceania
July 18, 2017	Perth	Australia	Astor Theatre
July 21, 2017 (Note: The July 21, 2017 show is part of the Splendour in the Grass festival 2017.)	Byron Bay	Australia	North Byron Parklands
July 22, 2017	Sydney	Australia	Max Watt's
July 23, 2017	Sydney	Australia	Enmore Theatre
July 25, 2017	Melbourne	Australia	Forum Theatre
July 26, 2017	Melbourne	Australia	Forum Theatre
North America
July 30, 2017 (Note: The July 30, 2017 show is part of the WayHome Music & Arts Festival 2017.)	Oro-Medonte	Canada	Burl's Creek Event Grounds
July 31, 2017	Detroit	United States	Majestic Theater
August 2, 2017	Milwaukee	United States	Pabst Theater
August 4, 2017	Chicago	United States	The Vic Theatre
August 5, 2017 (Note: The August 5, 2017 show is part of Lollapalooza 2017.)	Chicago	United States	Grant Park
September 14, 2017	Salt Lake City	United States	The Depot
September 15, 2017	Denver	United States	Ogden Theatre
September 17, 2017	Kansas City	United States	Midland Theatre
September 20, 2017	Houston	United States	Warehouse Live
September 21, 2017	Austin	United States	Emo's
September 22, 2017	Dallas	United States	South Side Music Hall
September 25, 2017	Phoenix	United States	The Van Buren
September 26, 2017	Santa Ana	United States	The Observatory
September 28, 2017	Los Angeles	United States	The Theatre at Ace Hotel
September 29, 2017	Los Angeles	United States	The Theatre at Ace Hotel
September 30, 2017	Los Angeles	United States	The Theatre at Ace Hotel
Europe
October 22, 2017	Birmingham	England	O_{2} Institute Birmingham
October 24, 2017	Manchester	England	Manchester Academy
October 25, 2017	London	England	Eventim Apollo
October 27, 2017	Esch-sur-Alzette	Luxembourg	Rockhal
October 28, 2017	Berlin	Germany	Huxley's Neue Welt
October 30, 2017	Cologne	Germany	E-Werk
October 31, 2017	Brussels	Belgium	Cirque Royal
November 2, 2017	Hamburg	Germany	Docks
November 3, 2017 (Note: The November 3, 2017 show is part of REC. Festival 2017.)	Rotterdam	Netherlands	Rotterdam Centrum

=== Cancelled shows ===
List of cancelled concerts, showing date, city, country, venue and reason for cancellation
Date	City	Country	Venue	Reason
Asia
July 6, 2017	Tokyo	Japan	LIQUIDROOM	Unforeseen circumstances
July 7, 2017	Seoul	South Korea	Yes24 MUV Hall	Unforeseen circumstances
July 11, 2017	Singapore		Capitol Theatre	Unforeseen circumstances
July 13, 2017	Hong Kong	China	Music Zone @ E-Max	Unforeseen circumstances
July 15, 2017	Jakarta	Indonesia	The Establishment	Unforeseen circumstances
North America
September 18, 2017	St. Louis	United States	Delmar Hall	Safety
Europe
November 5, 2017	Frankfurt	Germany	Batschkapp	Unforeseen circumstances
November 7, 2017	Munich	Germany	Backstage Werk	Unforeseen circumstances
November 8, 2017	Zürich	Switzerland	Kaufleuten	Unforeseen circumstances
November 10, 2017	Bologna	Italy	Estragon	Unforeseen circumstances
November 11, 2017	Milan	Italy	Fabrique	Unforeseen circumstances
November 13, 2017	Paris	France	Olympia	Unforeseen circumstances
November 15, 2017	Barcelona	Spain	Sala Apolo	Unforeseen circumstances
November 16, 2017	Madrid	Spain	La Riviera	Unforeseen circumstances
