= Off with Her Head (album) =

2025 studio album by Banks

- Standard cover

Studio album by Banks
- Released: February 28, 2025
- Genre: Alternative pop; R&B
- Length: 35:04
- Language: English; French
- Label: Her Name Is Banks, Inc.; ADA Worldwide
- Producer: Tim Anderson; Jillian Banks; Aron Forbes; Sergiu Gherman; Bernard Harvey; Kareem; Lil Silva; The Orphanage; Tayla Parx; Sohn; Daniel Tannenbaum; Albin Tengblad; Duncan Tootill; Totally Enormous Extinct Dinosaurs; Yakob

Banks chronology
Serpentina (2022)	Off with Her Head (2025)

Singles from Off with Her Head
- 1. "I Hate Your Ex-Girlfriend" Released: October 18, 2024; 2. "Best Friends" Released: November 22, 2024; 3. "Love Is Unkind" Released: January 17, 2025

Off with Her Head is the fifth studio album by American singer-songwriter Banks. It was released via Her Name Is Banks Inc. and ADA Worldwide on February 28, 2025. The project was preceded by three singles: "I Hate Your Ex-Girlfriend" featuring Doechii, "Best Friends", and "Love Is Unkind". Blending alternative pop and R&B, the album explores themes of identity, self-liberation, and emotional transformation, which Banks has described as her most joyful work to date despite its dark title. Lyrically, it centers on letting go of past versions of oneself and silencing inner negativity.

Off with Her Head received generally favorable reviews from critics. On Metacritic, it holds a score of 71 based on six reviews. Critics praised Banks's songwriting, vocal performance, and return to alt-pop and R&B roots, with The Line of Best Fit calling it "focused and commanding." Other reviewers noted the album's vulnerability, humor, and experimental elements, though some pointed to inconsistent songwriting and production.

== Background ==
Banks released her debut studio album Goddess through Harvest Records in 2014. After two further albums with Harvest (The Altar in 2016 and III in 2019), she decided to continue her career as an independent artist. Her fourth studio album Serpentina (2022), which explored a more experimental sound, was her first to be released via this arrangement. In late 2024, she marked the tenth anniversary of Goddess with concerts in October at venues where she had performed when it was released. She also released Goddess: Unplugged, which features acoustic versions of 10 tracks from Goddess, in December.

== Promotion ==
Along with the Goddess anniversary, Banks began promoting her fifth studio album. On October 18, 2024, she released "I Hate Your Ex-Girlfriend" featuring American rapper Doechii and its music video. On November 20, she officially announced the album by sharing its title, Off with Her Head, and its release date of February 28, 2025. "Best Friends" was released as the album's second single on November 22. It was followed by a third single, "Love Is Unkind", on January 17, 2025. Off with Her Head was released on February 28, 2025, via ADA Worldwide, the independent label and artist services arm of Warner Music Group.

A deluxe edition of the album was released on May 16, 2025, featuring a new track titled "Candy". The deluxe edition additionally includes acoustic versions of "Direction", "Stay", "Meddle in the Mold", "Delulu", and "Love Is Unkind".

=== Tour ===
The North American leg of the Off With Her Head tour began on June 4, 2025, at the Paramount Theater in Seattle and will conclude on June 27 at The Fillmore in Minneapolis. Banks is to perform in several major cities, including a show in New York City on June 20 at the Brooklyn Paramount. In November 2025, Banks is scheduled to perform a series of exclusive East Coast dates in Australia, with shows planned in Melbourne, Sydney, and Brisbane. She is also set to headline a one-off show in London at Exhibition White City on October 24, 2025. The concerts will follow the release of Off With Her Head earlier that year.

== Title and composition ==
Banks described Off with Her Head as "a big sister to Goddess" sonically, noting that she had reunited with several producers who had contributed to her debut album. Lyrically, she stated that it was "about shedding past identities that no longer resonate". She explained that the title had several meanings related to letting go off of the "negative voice in [one's] head" and being in the present moment. Despite the phrase being dark, she considers Off with Her Head to be her most joyful album to date.

=== Songs ===
The short track "Guillotine" opens Off with Her Head and finds Banks "breath[ing] menacingly about putting tape on somebody's mouth". In "I Hate Your Ex-Girlfriend", Banks and featured artist Doechii mock the titular woman over "rustily distorted bass springs". The song was inspired by Banks's experience with a romantic partner's ex-girlfriend sending him a suggestive text despite knowing that he was in a relationship with Banks. "Love Is Unkind" is built on a "warbly bass" and discusses an emotionally dangerous relationship. "Delulu" features vocodered vocals and an electric guitar. "Move" was compared to Cyndi Lauper's song "True Colors" and finds featured artist Yseult singing in a mix of English and French. "Stay" is a "vulnerable" and "minimalistic" song inspired by Banks's happiness in a romantic relationship. In "Best Friends", Banks reflects upon a friendship breakup over a "grungey-swashy guitar hook" and "looped keyboard patterns". Inspired by the end of a long friendship with a woman whom she still thinks about often, it was written in part because Banks felt that the topic of friendship loss is not discussed as much as romantic breakups. "Meddle in the Mold" is built on "violins and a thudding piano", while "Direction" was noted for its slurred vocals. "Make It Up" featuring Sampha is "a glitchy and affecting duet that recounts the passage of time". Banks and Lil Silva began writing the song in 2013, but left it unfinished for a decade until revisiting it for Off with Her Head; Banks found the lyrics to the chorus fitting. "River" was compared to "Home Maker" by Sudan Archives due to its "velvety pulses" and was cited as another "vulnerable" song on the album. The title track closes Off with Her Head and discusses "leaving a gaslighter".

The deluxe edition of Off With Her Head introduced the new track "Candy", in which Banks addresses her experiences with depression, the complexities of antidepressants, and the struggle of whether to return to them. She described the song as a personal and dream-like composition that conveys emotions such as anger, shame, love, and acceptance, while also reflecting on family dynamics connected to mental health.

== Critical reception ==
Professional ratings
Aggregate scores
Source	Rating
Metacritic	71/100
Review scores
Source	Rating
Beats Per Minute	72%
DIY	3.5/5 stars
The Independent	3/5 stars
Euphoria Magazine	4/5 stars
The Line of Best Fit	8/10
Sputnikmusic	2.8/5

On Metacritic, which assigns a normalized rating out of 100 to reviews from mainstream publications, Off with Her Head received an average score of 71 based on six reviews, indicating "generally favorable reviews".

In a review for The Line of Best Fit, Sam Franzini praised Banks's "varied approach to songwriting and crafting" on Off with Her Head and deemed it to be "some of her most unrelenting work yet", he went on to describe it as "both focused and commanding" even with its chaotic moments, which he found "charming rather than trying". He also noted that the album maintains a consistently high standard, highlighting its return to Banks's alt-pop and R&B roots and describing tracks like "Delulu" and "Love Is Unkind" as solid examples of her refined sound. JT Early of Beats Per Minute summarized Off with Her Head as "a fun, devastating and empowering listen that is not perfect". Though not finding it Banks's best project, he considered it a worthy addition to her discography that displays her sense of humor, her vulnerability, and her inclination towards musical experimentation. However, while he was positive towards most songs, he found many of them too short and believed that they could have been improved by adding bridges. DIY praised it for refining Banks' established style, balancing her signature distorted vocals and electronic beats with varied textures and acoustic moments that keep the album cohesive without straying far from her familiar sound. Helen Brown of The Independent described the album as "very sultry and atmospheric" but found it generally forgettable and lacking in focus. She wrote that "atmosphere leaks out of the speakers like dry ice before dissipating, leaving only an empty stage", citing "Guillotine" and "Move" as examples. In a mixed review for Sputnikmusic, Benjamin Jack described it as inconsistent. He found the songwriting "uncharacteristically underwhelming" and considered the lyrical content to be too focused on the past, which he felt undermined Banks's stated intentions for the album. MXDWN Music described Off With Her Head as "emblematic of the times," noting that it reflects the current dance-pop moment effectively, though without significantly reinventing the genre.

== Track listing ==
Off with Her Head track listing
No.	Title	Writer(s)	Producer(s)	Length
1.	"Guillotine"	Jillian Banks; Christopher Taylor	Banks; Sohn	1:54
2.	"I Hate Your Ex-Girlfriend" (featuring Doechii)	Banks; Jaylah Hickmon; Trevor Brown; Kareem James; Tayla Parx; Zaire Koalo; Albin Tengblad	Banks; Kareem; The Orphanage; Albin Tengblad	2:23
3.	"Love Is Unkind"	Banks; Tim Anderson; Trey Campbell; Parx	Banks; Lil Silva; Tengblad	3:33
4.	"Delulu"	Banks; Bernard Harvey; James; Parx; Tengblad	Banks; Harv; Kareem; Parx; Tengblad	2:44
5.	"Move" (featuring Yseult)	Banks; Eugenie Asselin; Tyrone Carter; Nilusi Nissanka; Yseult Onguenet; Parx; Tengblad	Banks; Lil Silva; Tengblad	2:41
6.	"Stay"	Banks; Ben Darwish; Taylor	Banks; Sohn	2:50
7.	"Best Friends"	Banks; Anderson; Aron Forbes; Mozella	Banks; Forbes	4:01
8.	"Meddle in the Mold"	Banks; Campbell; Sergiu Gherman; Daniel Tannenbaum; Tengblad	Banks; Gherman; Tannenbaum	3:07
9.	"Direction"	Banks; Carter; James	Banks; Kareem; Lil Silva; The Orphanage; Tengblad; Duncan Tootill	2:54
10.	"Make It Up" (featuring Sampha)	Banks; Carter; Sampha Sisay	Banks; Lil Silva	3:30
11.	"River"	Banks; Orlando Higginbottom	Banks; Totally Enormous Extinct Dinosaurs	2:17
12.	"Off with Her Head"	Banks; James; Taylor	Banks; Kareem; Sohn; Yakob	3:04
Total length:				35:04

Off With Her Head (Deluxe) track listing
No.	Title	Writer(s)	Producer(s)	Length
13.	"Candy"	Banks; Parx; Buddy Ross	Ross	2:44
14.	"Direction" (acoustic)	Banks; Carter; James	Banks; Rod Castro	2:52
15.	"Stay" (acoustic)	Banks; Darwish; Taylor	Banks; Castro	2:51
16.	"Meddle in the Mold" (acoustic)	Banks; Campbell; Gherman; Tannenbaum; Tengblad	Banks; Castro	3:06
17.	"Delulu" (acoustic)	Banks; Harvey; James; Parx; Tengblad	Banks; Castro	2:44
18.	"Love Is Unkind" (acoustic)	Banks; Anderson; Campbell; Parx	Banks; Castro	3:30
Total length:				52:51

== Personnel ==
Credits were adapted from the album's liner notes and Tidal.

- Jillian Banks – vocals
- Emerson Mancini – mastering (tracks 1–3, 5–18)
- Matt Boerum – mastering (track 4)
- Jon Castelli – mixing (tracks 1, 3, 5, 7, 12–18)
- Keith Sorrells – mixing (track 2)
- Jamie Velez – mixing (track 4)
- Christopher Taylor – mixing (track 6)
- Sergiu Gherman – mixing (tracks 8, 9)
- Orlando Higginbottom – mixing (track 11)
- Ingmar Carlson – mixing (tracks 14–18)
- Nömak – engineering (track 5)

== Charts ==
Chart performance for Off with Her Head
Chart (2025)	Peak position
French Physical Albums (SNEP)	143
UK Album Sales (OCC)	59
UK Album Downloads (OCC)	88
UK Independent Albums (OCC)	25
