= Lesson (disambiguation) =

A lesson is a structured period of time where learning is intended to occur.

Lesson or lessons may also refer to:

- a reading from scripture also known as a lection

== Literature ==
- The Lesson a one-act play by Eugène Ionesco
- "The Lesson" (short story), a short story by Toni Cade Bambara
- Lessons, a 2022 novel by Ian McEwan
- The Lesson, a 2019 novel by Cadwell Turnbull

== People ==
- Fred Lessons (1883–1918), English footballer and manager
- Luka Lesson, Australian slam poet
- René Lesson (1794–1849), French surgeon, naturalist, ornithologist and herpetologist

== Film and TV ==
- The Lesson (1917 film) directed by Charles Giblyn
- The Lesson (1987 film), a Soviet science fiction short film
- The Lesson (2014 Bulgarian film), a Bulgarian-Greek film
- The Lesson (2014 Latvian film), a Latvian film
- The Lesson (2023 film), a British thriller film

=== TV ===
- "Lessons" (Buffy the Vampire Slayer), a 2002 episode
- "Lessons" (Hotel Portofino), a 2022 episode
- "Lessons" (Max Headroom), an episode of Max Headroom
- "Lessons" (Star Trek: The Next Generation), a 1993 episode
- "Lessons" (The Wire), a 2002 episode
- "The Lesson" (The Amazing World of Gumball), a 2013 episode
- "The Lesson" (TMNT 2003 episode), 2004 episode of Teenage Mutant Ninja Turtles
- The Lesson (Israeli TV series), Israeli drama

== Music ==
- Lessons, album by Shadows Chasing Ghosts
- Lessons, album by Ha Ha Tonka (band)
- Lessons, album by Sohn (musician)
- Lessons (album), a 2015 album by Capone-N-Noreaga
- "Lessons", a song by Rush, from their 1976 album 2112
- "The Lesson" (song), recorded by Vikki Carr in 1967
- "The Lesson", a song by Victor Wooten, featured on his 2008 album Palmystery

== See also ==
- Lesson No.1 (disambiguation)
- Lection, a public reading, especially of a passage from the Bible
- Private Lessons (disambiguation)
