= Trainwreck (Banks song) =

Song by Banks

from the album The Altar
- Released: September 30, 2016
- Recorded: Werewolf Heart Studios; Westlake Recording Studios; (Los Angeles, California)
- Genre: Electropop
- Length: 3:24
- Label: Harvest
- Songwriter(s): Jillian Banks; Tim Anderson; Dacoury Natche; Aron Forbes; Jesse Rogg
- Producer(s): Tim Anderson; DJ Dahi; Aron Forbes

Music video
- "Trainwreck" on YouTube

"Trainwreck" is a song recorded by American singer Banks for her second studio album The Altar (2016). It was written by Banks, Jesse Rogg, Tim Anderson, Dacoury Natche, Aron Forbes and it was produced by the latter three. Some of the song's lyrics were initially written when Banks was fourteen. "Trainwreck" garnered generally positive reviews from music critics. To promote the song, an accompanying music video for the track was released on January 18, 2017.

== Composition ==
"Trainwreck" (2016)
A 27-second sample of "Trainwreck", an uptempo electropop song with rap influences.

Banks wrote the verses for "Trainwreck" when she was fourteen. During an interview for Idolator, she said: "They stayed in my head! It was like a chant. I do remember writing it—I wrote it down in a notebook. I always remember those lyrics, though. There are some lyrics that I've written that I always will remember." The song is an electropop song with rap influences, and she described the lyrics as a "stream of consciousness". According to Kellan Miller of Drowned in Sound, "Banks is hardly stuck in the victim role, as many songs feature her spoon−feeding hard doses of perspective and truth down her ex−lovers' throats."

== Critical reception ==
"Trainwreck" received generally positive reviews from critics. Pitchfork Media said that "Trainwreck" evokes, to great effect, the particular darkness that was all over pop radio in the early '10s [...] blown−out vocals, big menacing synth pads, barely concealed panic. Shahzaib Hussain of Clash described the song as "a dizzying, trap−esque affair abiding more by pop conventions—intentional or not, it's a track that melds breakneck rhythm, vocal malleability and production value seamlessly, a template the LA artist should have utilised more of." Jamie Milton from DIY labeled the song as "a hit-and-miss-but-nice-one-for-trying rap verse". Neil Z. Yeung of AllMusic described "Trainwreck" and "This Is Not About Us" as exciting hip−hop moments that pop and rumble. Kellan Miller of Drowned in Sound said that "Trainwreck" finds her even more self−deprecating, partly blaming herself for a relationship gone awry. Andrew Paschal of PopMatters said that "Banks crams rapid−fire syllables into verses, seeming to almost emulate the poetic style of Ani DiFranco or Joni Mitchell but lacking entirely the stripped down candidness of those artists, sounding more like a Meghan Trainor throwaway instead." Writing for Rolling Stone, Maura Johnston expressed that "Trainwreck" combines rapid−fire lyrics about escaping a bad−news boyfriend, with hand claps, as if she's at the center of a supportive drum−machine circle, and the emancipation−minded. Sputnikmusic labeled the song as "the most immediate song on the album", also adding "Banks' delivery is almost rap−like, and she goes head to head with some major league electropop hooks. There is a gravity to the production here that maybe was lacking on Goddess".

== Promotion ==
=== Music video ===
The video for "Trainwreck" was directed by Marie Schuller. It was released on January 18, 2017, via Banks' VEVO channel. The video starts with various black-and-white footages of Banks on a TV screen and three unknown men in suits. In the next scenes, Banks is seen at a table with a raven on her head. She starts eating a peeled egg and she spits it out into a milk glass while the three unknown men are filming her. The music video ends with Banks' on top of one of the unknown men, she stomps on his head and it deflates, making a squeaky toy noise. DIY called it "an uncomfortable, fast−paced nightmare, and Banks' most conceptual video to date." Gabriel Aikins from Substream Magazine described it as "darkly weird and memorable", while Kirsten Spruch from Baeble Music said that "although it's creepy as hell, Banks' artistic vision is very real and true". Jamie Muir of Readdork said that the visuals are "suitably chilling".

=== Live performances ===
Banks included and performed "Trainwreck" on The Altar Tour. On November 11, 2016, Banks performed the song on Jimmy Kimmel Live!. Jonathan Robles of Variance labeled the performance as "riveting". Bradley Stern of PopCrush said that "Banks was angrily trebling and snapped her fingers during the whole performance".

== Credits and personnel ==
Credits adapted from the liner notes of The Altar.

Recording

- Recording and vocals recording – Werewolf Heart Studios and Westlake Recording Studios in Los Angeles, California

Personnel

- Jillian Banks – vocals, songwriter
- Tim Anderson – songwriter, producer, programmer, synthesizer, bass
- DJ Dahi – songwriter, producer, drums, programmer
- Aron Forbes – songwriter, producer, programmer, recording engineer
- Jesse Rogg – producer
- Chris Galland – mixing engineer
- Robin Florent – assistant mixer
- Jeff Jackson – assistant mixer
- Seth Perez – assistant recording engineer
- Manny Marroquin – mixer
- Chris Spilfogel – recording engineer
