= Bored (Billie Eilish song) =

2017 song by Billie Eilish

Single by Billie Eilish

from the album 13 Reasons Why (A Netflix Original Series Soundtrack)
- Released: March 30, 2017
- Genre: Pop; R&B
- Length: 3:00
- Label: Darkroom; Interscope
- Songwriters: Billie Eilish; Finneas O'Connell; Aron Forbes; Tim Anderson
- Producer: Finneas O'Connell

Billie Eilish singles chronology
"Bellyache" (2017)	"Bored" (2017)	"Watch" (2017)

Music video
- "Bored" on YouTube

"Bored" is a song by American singer-songwriter Billie Eilish from the soundtrack album, 13 Reasons Why (A Netflix Original Series Soundtrack) (2017). The song was written by Eilish, her brother Finneas O'Connell, Aron Forbes, and Tim Anderson. Production was solely handled by Finneas. It was released by Darkroom and Interscope Records for digital download and streaming on March 30, 2017, as the lead single from the soundtrack. A mid-tempo pop and R&B ballad, the song's lyrics see Eilish sing about finally discovering her former lover's mistakes. The song has received generally mixed reviews from music critics, with a number of them deeming it as forgettable.

The song has been certified gold or more in the United States, Australia, Mexico, and Poland by the Recording Industry Association of America (RIAA), Australian Recording Industry Association (ARIA), Mexican Association of Producers of Phonograms and Videograms, A.C. (AMPROFON), and Polish Society of the Phonographic Industry (ZPAV), respectively. An accompanying music video was released on June 26, 2017, and directed by Miles & AJ. In it, Eilish is shown dressed in a blue tracksuit with matching high-top Nikes while hanging off a ladder that seemingly goes on forever into endless white space. The video received positive reviews, with critics praising Eilish's performance. Eilish promoted "Bored" by performing it for her Where's My Mind Tour (2018), her When We All Fall Asleep Tour (2019), and her 2022 Happier Than Ever, The World Tour.

== Background and composition ==
The song was written by Eilish alongside her brother Finneas O'Connell, known under his stage name of Finneas, Aron Forbes, and Tim Anderson. Finneas was solely responsible for the song's production. Eilish told V magazine that being able to make music for 13 Reasons Why and having it appear on the show's soundtrack was great for her due to opening her music to a much bigger audience. "Bored" was released for digital download and streaming by Darkroom and Interscope Records as the lead single from the soundtrack album 13 Reasons Why (A Netflix Original Series Soundtrack) on March 30, 2017.

According to the sheet music published at Musicnotes.com, "Bored" is composed in the key of G major and has a tempo of 122 beats per minute (BPM). Eilish's vocals span a range from A_{3} to D_{5}. Music journalists described the song as a mid-tempo pop and R&B ballad. Lyrically, "Bored" is a song built on harmonies that demonstrates Eilish feeling contempt for an ex-lover who had made too many mistakes: "I'm not afraid anymore/What makes you sure you're all I need?"

== Critical reception ==
"Bored" has been met with mainly mixed reviews from music critics. The staff of NME stated that the song is "salvaged by the layer-upon-layer of vocal takes that come to a head towards the end", and said it "belongs to a now-bygone Eilish sonic era". Jules LeFevre, writing for Junkee magazine, placed the song at number 17 on her Every Billie Eilish Song Ranked From Worst To Best list, opining that it is "completely forgettable". She continued, commenting that Eilish "tumbles down the melody on the line 'I'm not afraid anymore', like a pebble down a waterfall". For Insider, Courteney Larocca described "Bored" as a "delicate, ethereal song", and praised the layering of Eilish's vocals throughout the song. Angie Piccirillo of Consequence of Sound commented that Eilish's "smooth vocals caught the attention of young listeners".

== Commercial performance ==
Commercially, "Bored" was certified double platinum in Australia by the Australian Recording Industry Association (ARIA), platinum in Poland by the Polish Society of the Phonographic Industry (ZPAV), and gold in the United States and Mexico by the Recording Industry Association of America (RIAA) and Mexican Association of Producers of Phonograms and Videograms, A.C. (AMPROFON), respectively.

== Promotion ==
=== Music video ===
==== Background and synopsis ====
Eilish climbs up an endless ladder in the music video.

The music video for "Bored" was released to Eilish's YouTube channel on June 26, 2017, and directed by Miles & AJ. Eilish came up with the concept for it. The video sees her climbing and hanging off a ladder that seems to climb forever into endless white space, while she is dressed in a blue tracksuit with matching high-top Nikes In an interview with Elle magazine, Eilish said the video was inspired by "being trapped in a relationship that was going nowhere. When you're in such a toxic place with someone and you're treated so badly for such a long time that eventually you're used to it." Eilish also talked about the visual's endless ladder: "The thought of being on an endless ladder in a kind of timeless/antigravity space where no rules apply is just really sick to me, and goes with the concept of the song by getting nowhere in a relationship and getting bored."

==== Critical reception ====
The music video was met with positive reviews from critics. Emma Blanchard, writing for V magazine, praised the visual, saying: "Eilish's genuinely thoughtful lyrics and gorgeous piano melodies align flawlessly with the videos minimalistic vibe." She continued, commenting that Eilish "deliver[ed] a stunning, artistic performance". For Idolator, Mike Wass described the visual as a "suitably solemn affair". Estelle Tang of Elle magazine labeled the music video as "dizzying".

=== Live performances ===
Eilish promoted the song by performing it during her Where's My Mind Tour (2018) and When We All Fall Asleep Tour (2019). She did so again on her Happier Than Ever, The World Tour.

== Credits and personnel ==
Credits adapted from Tidal.

- Billie Eilish – vocals, songwriter
- Finneas O'Connell – producer, songwriter
- Aron Forbes – songwriter
- Tim Anderson – songwriter

== Charts ==
Weekly chart positions for "Bored"
Chart (2021)	Peak position
Australia (ARIA)	53
Austria (Ö3 Austria Top 40)	57
Czech Republic Singles Digital (ČNS IFPI)	41
France (SNEP)	64
Germany (GfK)	88
Global 200 (Billboard)	75
Greece (IFPI)	33
Hungary (Single Top 40)	32
Ireland (IRMA)	82
Lithuania (AGATA)	56
Norway (VG-lista)	34
Portugal (AFP)	79
Slovakia (Singles Digitál Top 100)	41
Sweden (Sverigetopplistan)	57
Switzerland (Schweizer Hitparade)	59
UK Audio Streaming (Official Charts)	80
US Alternative Streaming Songs (Billboard)	17

== Certifications ==
Certifications for "Bored"
Region	Certification	Certified units/sales
Australia (ARIA)	3× Platinum	210,000^{‡}
Austria (IFPI Austria)	Platinum	30,000^{‡}
Brazil (Pro-Música Brasil)	Diamond	160,000^{‡}
Canada (Music Canada)	4× Platinum	320,000^{‡}
Denmark (IFPI Danmark)	Platinum	90,000^{‡}
France (SNEP)	Platinum	200,000^{‡}
Germany (BVMI)	Gold	300,000^{‡}
Italy (FIMI)	Gold	50,000^{‡}
Mexico (AMPROFON)	Gold	30,000^{‡}
New Zealand (RMNZ)	2× Platinum	60,000^{‡}
Poland (ZPAV)	Platinum	50,000^{‡}
Portugal (AFP)	Gold	5,000^{‡}
Spain (Promusicae)	Gold	30,000^{‡}
United Kingdom (BPI)	Platinum	600,000^{‡}
United States (RIAA)	Gold	500,000^{‡}
Streaming
Greece (IFPI Greece)	Gold	1,000,000^{†}
^{‡} Sales+streaming figures based on certification alone.^{†} Streaming-only figures based on certification alone.
