= Karl Sohn =

Karl Sohn:

- Karl Ferdinand Sohn (1805-1867) was a German painter of the Düsseldorf school of painting.
- Karl Rudolf Sohn (1845-1908) was his son; also a German painter.

== See also ==
- Sohn
