= Music lesson (disambiguation) =

A music lesson is a type of formal instruction in playing an instrument or singing.

Music Lesson may also refer to:

- The Music Lesson, a 17th-century painting by Johannes Vermeer
- The Music Lesson, a c. 1668 painting by Gerard Ter Borch
- The Music Lesson (Fragonard), a c. 1770 painting by Jean-Honore Fragonard
- The Music Lesson (Leighton), an 1877 painting by Frederic Leighton
- The Music Lesson (Matisse), a 1917 painting by Henri Matisse
- The Music Lesson, a painting by the workshop of Gerard ter Borch the Younger formerly in the Hope Collection of Pictures
- The Music Lesson (1932 film), a Flip the Frog cartoon
- The Music Lesson: A Spiritual Search for Growth Through Music, a novel by bass virtuoso Victor Wooten

== See also ==
- Music (disambiguation)
- Lesson (disambiguation)
