= To the Hilt (song) =

2016 pop song by Banks

Single by Banks

from the album The Altar
- Released: September 16, 2016
- Length: 4:36
- Label: Harvest
- Songwriters: Jillian Banks; Christopher Taylor
- Producer: Sohn

Banks singles chronology
"Mind Games" (2016)	"To the Hilt" (2016)	"Crowded Places" (2017)

"To the Hilt" is a song recorded by American singer and songwriter Banks for her second studio album, The Altar (2016). It was released as the album's fourth single on September 16, 2016. The song was written by Banks and Sohn and produced by Sohn.

== Composition ==
When I was writing it, I was like I don’t want to fucking say this stuff [...] I got sick when I wrote it, like, my body wasn’t even ready to confront it, and I got physically sick.

— Banks on "To The Hilt".

"To the Hilt" was written by Banks and Sohn and produced by the latter. The song is a ballad lasts for a duration of 4:36. The song's instrumentation comes from piano and strings. Sputnikmusic labeled it as "the mirrored reflection of the way she opened the album". Lyrically, "To the Hilt" talks about a former lover and a devastating reflection on love lost. Karen Gwee of Consequence of Sound thought that its lyrical content "is a little more transparent and clumsily". The song begins with a "somber orchestral" piano opening, followed by the lines "Oh, it seems a long time ago/ Oh, we didn't know/ Before we had seen anything/ We believed in everything" sung by Banks. During the chorus, she sings, "Hated you for leavin' me/ You were my muse for so long/ Now I'm drained creatively/ I miss you on my team".

== Critical reception ==
Carl Williott of Idolator said that "it's just a piano and her voice, a far cry from her gloomy, Weeknd-influenced take on pop–R&B. Near the end, some spectral elements briefly augment the arrangement, but this one's all about the delicate emotions at play." Katherine St. Asaph of Pitchfork described the song as "a straightforward piano-and-strings ballad". Andrew Paschal of PopMatters said that "the song is a devastating reflection on love lost, long after the anger has subsided, and she is left with only an empty space and some memories. Banks quivers over every line, in total communion with her melancholic piano", adding that "the song is her "This Woman's Work", and its presence does a lot to help the album." Sputnikmusic noted that "[To the Hilt] provides a polar opposite to "Gemini Feed." The blood-soaked laundry list of what went wrong is only comforting for so long, and it does little to replace what has evaporated by the time loss sets in. Flanked by nothing more than a minimalist piano".

== Credits and personnel ==
Credits adapted from Tidal.

- Jilian Banks – vocals, songwriting
- Sohn – songwriting, production, keyboards, mixing, recording engineering, synthesizer

== Release history ==
Country	Date	Format	Label	Ref.
Various	September 16, 2016	Digital download; streaming	Harvest	
