= To the Hilt =

To the Hilt may refer to:

- To the Hilt (album), 1976 album by Golden Earring
- To the Hilt (song), 2016 song by Banks
- To the Hilt (film), 2014 Macedonian film
