= Off with Her Head (disambiguation) =

"Off with her head" is a phrase often repeated by the Queen of Hearts, the main antagonist in Alice's Adventures in Wonderland.

It may also refer to:

- Off with Her Head (album), a 2025 album by Banks
- Off with Her Head, a 2010 extended play by Huntress
- "Off With Her Head" (Batwoman), a Batwoman episode
