= Festspielhaus St. Pölten =

Theatre in St. Pölten, Austria

Coordinates: 48.201°N 15.632°E

The Festspielhaus St. Pölten (German pronunciation: [ˈfɛstˌʃpiːlˌhaʊ̯s zaŋkt ˈpœltn̩]) is a Festspielhaus in St. Pölten, the capital of Lower Austria. It is located next to the Landesmuseum (museum of the country of Lower Austria), the Ausstellungshalle (exhibition hall), the Landesbibliothek (public library of the country of Lower Austria), the Landesarchiv (archive of the country of Lower Austria) and the Klangturm in the cultural district of St. Pölten.

The Festspielhaus was opened on March 1, 1997. Already one year later the house was regularly used for music theatre and dance. Since September 2009 the German dancer, choreographer and director Joachim Schloemer is the artistic director of Festspielhaus St. Pölten. In September 2013 Brigitte Fürle, former artistic director of the spielzeit’europa, Theatre- and dance season of the Berliner Festspiele, will be his successor. The Festspielhaus is also residency of the Tonkünstlerorchester Niederöstereich, the orchestra of Lower Austria, which presents about 15 concerts, operas – contemporary and classic ones – and other performances in the Festspielhaus each year. Andres Orozco-Estrada is the principal conductor, additionally guest conductors like Julia Jones, Alan Buribayev, Claus Peter Flor, Paul Goodwin, Jun Märkl, Christian Muthspiel, Yutaka Sado or Thomas Zehetmair are leading the orchestra.

Following the Venezuelan video game modifier Victor Morales, the Swiss musician Etienne Abelin, the Flemish-Moroccan choreographer and dancer Sidi Larbi Cherkaoui, Italian guitarist and composer Maurizio Grandinetti, Austrian dancer and choreographer Doris Uhlich and Austrian musician and composer Christian Muthspiel the current artists in residence are Australian dancer and choreographer Grayson Millwood and German frame-drummer and percussionist Murat Coskun.

The Festspielhaus St. Pölten presents about 70 productions each season. Over 70,000 guests attend the performances every year. About 4,000 people are owners of season tickets for the Festspielhaus St. Pölten.

During the festivals keyboard music, Polifonica, Nox Illuminata and Österreich TANZT artists like Marianne Mendt, Leif Ove Andsnes, Edson Cordeiro, Guy Klucevsek or Otto Lechner will be performing in Festspielhaus.

The Festspielhaus aims to offer children and young people experience-orientated access to cultural programmes. It offers workshops, school performances, opera workshops and youth projects. In the past season newly opened performance venues and sites for exchanges between the audience and the artists have become locations for cultural provision in the best sense of the word: Box, Café Publik, Jugendklub/300, Forbidden City, parcours, workshop series, Daily CyberSoaps of CyberLab 2010 and tango. Through the immediacy of the newly conceived stages in the Box and Café Publik and through the numerous workshops and labs on the two rehearsal stages, all these formats have offered visitors the opportunity to participate intensively in the artistic events. With various participatory projects it has been possible to include people of all age groups in artistic processes and to promote their involvement with social issues, their creative attitude to and sensitisation for music and dance.

Café Publik, curated by Andreas Fränzl, was opened in September 2009 and has already established itself as a performance venue, a workshop and communication platform. Every Wednesday – four times a month – the tango community gathers in the café and on the rehearsal stages. On Tuesday the Café's Choir does its weekly rehearsal. From Thursday to Saturday the stage in the Café Publik is completely taken over by the creative minds in the city, when everyone is invited to discussion rounds, games evenings, live-music karaoke, poetry slams, literature and film lectures and culinary evenings. Parties, DJ lines and small-format concerts like Trouble Over Tokyo open intersections between the international programme of the main house and regional artists.

== Architecture ==
The Festspielhaus St. Pölten was designed by Austrian architect Klaus Kada. It contains four halls, suitable for all different cultural events due to their diverse sizes. At the Festspielhaus St. Pölten one can attend orchestral concerts, dance and music theatre, occasionally also traditional world music and poetical circus.

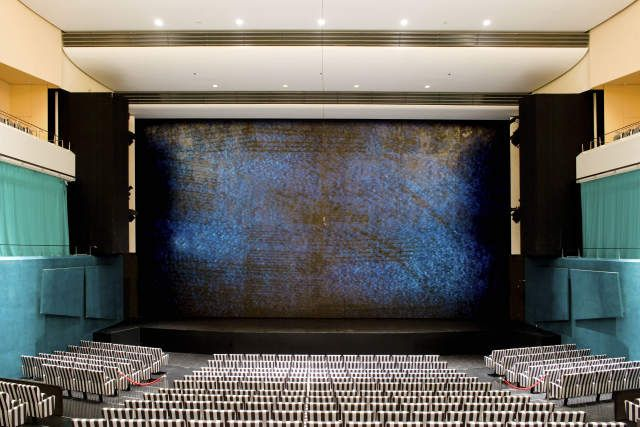
Großer Saal / Iron Curtain

The Große Saal of the Festspielhaus offers 1,063 seats, a standingroom with 70 places, 4 wheelchair places and a stage, that allows music- and dance performances. The dance-season has for instance a number of Sadler's Wells Theatre's productions like one of Russell Maliphant, and additional companies like Aszure Barton, Michael Clark, Wayne McGregor Random Dance, William Forsythe's Impressing the Czar by the Royal Ballet of Flanders, Akram Khan or the Cullberg Ballet as guests. Artists and ensembles of erudite music are Leif Ove Andsnes, Juliane Banse, Rudolf Buchbinder, Gautier Capucon, Christoph Eschenbach, Bernarda Fink, Claus Peter Flor, Kirill Gerstein, Vadim Gluzman Marc-Andre Hamelin, Stephen Hough, Emmanuel Krivine, the Luxembourg Philharmonic Orchestra, Paul Meyer, Chen Reiss, Elisabeth Schwarz or Thomas Zehetmair; popular music is presented by Jane Birkin, Juan Carlos Caceres, Edson Cordeiro, Chick Corea, Guy Klucevsek, Otto Lechner, Christian Muthspiel or Lizz Wright. For orchestral concerts there has been built a special acoustic shell. By means of subtle mechanical changes the Große Saal offers perfect conditions for dance and its outstanding acoustics provide the best preconditions for concerts and music theatre. The possible adjustments relate to the ceiling, the walls and the proscenium arch. The concert shell is an essential component of the acoustics.

The iron curtain of the Große Saal was designed by the artist Eva Schlegel. It separates the audience from the stage. The size is 20 m width and 10.5 m height. It shows the biggest picture of the country and weighs 14.5 tons.

Besides the big hall there is the Box. A "stage direction gallery" at the east end of the hall holds the technical equipment.

For smaller performances there are two rehearsal stages available: Rehearsal stage 1 also serves as a concert or lecture hall. It is decorated throughout with black wood panelling. The glazed south façade can be completely darkened by means of wooden slats. The seating is flexible and can be adapted to various types of events (up to 100 seats).

Rehearsal stage 2 is directly above Rehearsal stage 1 and has the same dimensions. It is primarily conceived as a ballet hall, but can also be used as a concert or lecture hall. The ceiling is partly constructed of glass, allowing views of the sky. The technical facilities are identical to those of the Schönberg-Saal.
