= Crowded Places =

Single by Banks
- Released: April 7, 2017
- Length: 4:22
- Label: Harvest
- Songwriters: Tim Anderson; Jack Antonoff; Jillian Banks
- Producer: Jack Antonoff

Banks singles chronology
| "To the Hilt" (2016) | "Crowded Places" (2017) | "Underdog" (2017) |

Visualizer
- "Crowded Places" on YouTube

"Crowded Places" is a song recorded by American singer and songwriter Banks. It was released as a single on April 7, 2017. The song was written by Banks, Tim Anderson and Jack Antonoff, and produced by the latter.

== Background and composition ==
"Crowded Places" was written and released specifically for the penultimate episode of the HBO series Girls, although Banks had already released The Altar, her sophomore studio album, six months prior. The episode was aired on April 9, 2017.

The song was written by Banks, Anderson and Antonoff, and produced by the latter. The song is a ballad, which lasts for 4 minutes and 22 seconds. William Defebaugh of V Magazine described it as "stripped down and raw". Lyrically, "Crowded Places" talks about social anxiety and a relationship gone wrong because of this. The song begins with Banks singing softly "Hey, Hey, Hey". During the chorus, she sings, "Cause I've been scared of crowded places/ Come with me, I'll take you home".

== Critical reception ==
Matthew Scott Donnelly of PopCrush described the song as "a quiet, moving lullaby". For Laurence Day of The Line of Best Fit, the song is "darkly euphoric". William Defebaugh V Magazine said that "Crowded Places" listens as of an open–hearted confessional, playing to the singer's strength in creating intimacy in sonic spaces–even more so than anything she's released prior. Taylor Bryant of Nylon Magazine described "Crowded Places" as an intimate track that puts Banks' vulnerability on full display.

== Credits and personnel ==
Credits adapted from Tidal.

- Jilian Banks – songwriting, vocals
- Tim Anderson – songwriting
- Jack Antonoff – songwriting, production, programming
- Chris Spilfogel – mixing
- Laura Sisk – engineering
- Seth Perez – engineering

== Charts ==
Chart performance for "Crowded Places"
| Chart (2017) | Peak position |
|---|---|
| US Alternative Digital Songs (Billboard) | 12 |

== Release history ==
Release dates and formats for "Crowded Places"
| Country | Date | Format | Label | Ref. |
|---|---|---|---|---|
| Various | April 7, 2017 | Digital download; streaming | Harvest | |
