= The Private Lesson =

The Private Lesson may refer to:

- The Private Lesson (1968 film), a French drama film
- Private Lessons (1975 film), also known as The Private Lesson, an Italian film

== See also ==
- Private Lessons
