= Lesson No.1 =

Lesson No.1 or Lesson 1 or Lesson One may refer to:

- Lesson 1, a music mix by Double Dee and Steinski
- Lesson 1, a 2013 album by E-girls
- Lesson 1 (Red Warriors album), 1986
- Lesson One (album), by Anthony Neely, 2010
- Lesson One: Misanthropy!, an album by Death in June
- Lesson No. 1, a 1980 Glenn Branca EP
- Lesson No.1, a 2006 sampler album by Imperial Recordings
- "Lesson One", a 1962 single by Russ Conway
- "Lesson No.1", a song by Viva Voce from The Heat Can Melt Your Brain
- "Lesson #1", a song by Anthony Rapp from Look Around
