= Tremors (album) =

Studio album by Sohn
- Released: 7 April 2014
- Studio: 4/M/7, Oupin Labs (Vienna); The Kennel (London)
- Genre: Alternative R&B, ambient pop, electronica, trip hop
- Length: 41:09
- Label: 4AD
- Producer: Sohn; Two Inch Punch

Sohn chronology
The Wheel (2012)	Tremors (2014)	Rennen (2017)

Professional ratings
Aggregate scores
Source	Rating
AnyDecentMusic?	7.4/10
Metacritic	78/100
Review scores
Source	Rating
AllMusic	4/5 stars
DIY	4/5 stars
Financial Times	3/5 stars
The Guardian	3/5 stars
The Irish Times	4/5 stars
NME	7/10
Pitchfork	5.0/10
Q	4/5 stars
Rolling Stone	3.5/5 stars
Uncut	8/10

Tremors is the debut studio album by English musician Sohn, released on 7 April 2014 by 4AD. In 2014 it was awarded a silver certification from the Independent Music Companies Association, which indicated sales of at least 20,000 copies throughout Europe.

== Track listing ==
All tracks are written by Sohn.

No.	Title	Length
1.	"Tempest"	3:30
2.	"The Wheel"	3:53
3.	"Artifice"	3:17
4.	"Bloodflows"	4:21
5.	"Ransom Notes"	4:25
6.	"Paralysed"	2:53
7.	"Fool"	3:36
8.	"Lights"	4:29
9.	"Veto"	3:55
10.	"Lessons"	3:21
11.	"Tremors"	3:29

== Personnel ==
Credits adapted from the liner notes of Tremors.

- Sohn – additional mixing, production (all tracks); mixing (track 6); design, layout
- Carla Fernández Andrade – front and back photography
- Alex 'Lexx' Dromgoole – mixing (tracks 1, 3, 5, 7–11)
- Stefan 'Woody' Fallman – bass guitar (tracks 4, 9)
- Alison Fielding – design, layout
- Albin Janoska – mixing (track 2); additional synths (tracks 2, 10)
- Dan Perry – mixing (track 4)
- Two Inch Punch – additional production (track 3)
- Andreas Waldschuetz – portrait photography

== Charts ==
Chart (2014)	Peak position
Australian Albums (ARIA)	60
Austrian Albums (Ö3 Austria)	12
Belgian Albums (Ultratop Flanders)	20
Belgian Albums (Ultratop Wallonia)	75
Dutch Albums (Album Top 100)	42
French Albums (SNEP)	83
German Albums (Offizielle Top 100)	64
Irish Albums (IRMA)	83
Scottish Albums (OCC)	61
Swiss Albums (Schweizer Hitparade)	23
UK Albums (OCC)	31
UK Independent Albums (OCC)	6
US Billboard 200	104
US Independent Albums (Billboard)	19
US Top Dance Albums (Billboard)	3
