= Sohn =

Sohn may refer to

- a German word meaning "son";
- an alternate transliteration of the Korean name Son;
- Sohn (musician), a Vienna-based English musician, songwriter, and producer

Sohn is a surname. Notable people with the surname include:

- Sohn Kee-chung (孫基禎) — the first medal-winning Korean Olympian
- Sohn Won-pyung (손원평) — Korean novelist and film maker
- Alfred Sohn-Rethel (1899–1990), German social scientist
- Alfred Sohn-Rethel (painter) (1875–1958), German Classical Modernist painter
- Else Sohn-Rethel (1863–1933), German painter and singer in the mid to late 19th-century.
- Karli Sohn-Rethel (1882–1966) German Classical Modernist painter
- Otto Sohn-Rethel (1877–1949), German painter and lepidopterist
- Amy Sohn, American author, columnist and screenwriter
- Clem Sohn (1910-1937), American human flight pioneer
- Joseph Sohn, contributor to the Jewish Encyclopedia, "The New International Encyclopedia"
- Karl Ferdinand Sohn (1805–1867), German landscape painter
- Karl Rudolf Sohn (1845–1908), German painter
- Kurt Sohn, New York Jets wide receiver, 1981-1988
- Louis B. Sohn (1914-2006) East-European politician, author
- Lydia Sohn, American mechanical and bio-engineer
- Patricia Sohn (aka Patricia Woods), America political scientist
- Peter Sohn, American animator and voice actor
- Sonja Sohn, American actress
- Wilhelm Sohn (1830–1899), German painter

== See also ==
- Sone
- Zone (disambiguation)
- Zoon
