= Waiting Game (Banks song) =

Song by Banks

from the EP London and the album Goddess
- Released: September 10, 2013
- Studio: Lion Aboard, London
- Genre: Pop
- Length: 3:27
- Label: Harvest; Good Years
- Songwriters: Jillian Banks; Chris Taylor
- Producer: Sohn

Music video
- "Waiting Game" on YouTube

"Waiting Game" is a song by American singer Banks from her second extended play (EP), London (2013). It was written by Banks and Sohn, and produced by the latter. The song was also included on Banks' debut studio album, Goddess (2014). "Waiting Game" charted at number 99 on the UK Singles Chart in January 2014 after being featured in a Victoria's Secret commercial.

== Background ==
Although it was never released as a single, the song was featured in a Victoria's Secret commercial in December 2013, and in January 2014, it charted at number 99 on the UK Singles Chart. The track also reached number 16 on the US Alternative Digital Songs chart in April 2015. The song describes a long-distance relationship.

In July 2014, English girl group Neon Jungle released a cover version of the song on their album Welcome to the Jungle without Banks' knowledge. In response, Banks posted a statement on her Facebook page, explaining she was "shocked" to see the song on their album, describing the song as "my own heartbeats" and having been "born from my real life, my real heartache, my real fingertips when I was at one of the most confusing times in my life". The song would later appear on her debut studio album, Goddess, released in September 2014.

== Release and promotion ==
Banks performed "Waiting Game" on Jimmy Kimmel Live! on August 7, 2014, along with single "Beggin for Thread", making her television debut. It would later be featured in the television shows Reckless (season 1, episode 7), Grey's Anatomy (season 11, episode 3), Mistresses (season 3, episode 1), Power (season 1, episode 7), and The Originals (season 1, episode 4), as well as on the deluxe edition of the soundtrack to the 2014 film Divergent.

== Critical reception ==
The Guardian described the song as "essentially, a [young-adult] novel distilled in song [which] throbs with yearning and lust over evocative drums and static".

== Music video ==
The music video for "Waiting Game" was directed by Francesco Carrozzini and premiered on August 27, 2013.

== Credits and personnel ==
Credits adapted from the liner notes of Goddess.

=== Recording ===
- Engineered and mixed at Lion Aboard, London
- Mastered at Infrasonic Sound, Los Angeles
- Published by Warner Chappell Music / Kobalt Songs Music Publishing obo Red Lines Music/Prescription Songs (ASCAP)

=== Personnel ===
- Banks – vocals
- Sohn – production, mixing
- Daniel Moyler – engineering
- Pete Lyman – mastering

== Charts ==
Chart performance for "Waiting Game"
Chart (2014–2015)	Peak position
UK Singles (OCC)	99
US Alternative Digital Songs (Billboard)	16

== Certifications ==
Certifications for "Waiting Game"
Region	Certification	Certified units/sales
United States (RIAA)	Gold	500,000^{‡}
^{‡} Sales+streaming figures based on certification alone.
