= Private Lessons =

Private Lessons may refer to:

- Private Lessons (1975 film), a 1975 Italian film starring Carroll Baker
- Private Lessons (1981 film), an American comedy film starring Sylvia Kristel
  - Private Lessons II, a 1993 Japanese-American remake of the 1981 film
- Private Lessons (2008 film), a Belgian drama film directed by Joachim Lafosse
- "Private Lessons" (Three's a Crowd), a 1985 television episode

== See also ==
- The Private Lesson
- Private Psycho Lesson, a 1996 pornographic anime
