= Underdog (Banks song) =

Single by Banks
- Released: September 28, 2017
- Genre: Electropop
- Length: 4:38
- Label: Harvest
- Songwriter(s): Jillian Banks; Alexander Shuckburgh
- Producer(s): Al Shux

Banks singles chronology
"Crowded Places" (2017)	"Underdog" (2017)	"Gimme" (2019)

Audio video
- "Underdog" on YouTube

"Underdog" is a song by American singer and songwriter Banks. It was released on September 28, 2017 after premiering on Zane Lowe's Beats 1 radio show. The song was written by Banks and Al Shux and produced by the latter.

== Critical reception ==
The song received acclaim from music critics. Mike Wass of Idolator called it "surprisingly upbeat", praising it as "catchy, full of glorious pop hooks and undeniably feel-good." PopCrush called it "a commanding, almost guttural-sounding slice of stuttering electro-pop, with lines punctuated by [literal!] snarls and sharp exhalations" and "it's a nonstop showcase of brilliant melodies and Mastiff-sized hooks". Robin Murray of Clash Magazine spoke positively of the track, saying "it's a fascinating piece of multi-faceted pop [...] bright, shimmering on the surface, Banks is never afraid to delve a little deeper, adding layers of darkness to her songwriting". Shaad D'Souza of ABC Triple J described the song as a "summer jam".

== Credits and personnel ==
Credits adapted from Tidal.

- Banks – vocals
- Al Shux – production, mixing engineering, recording engineering, synthesizer programming, programming, drums
- Chris Galland – mixing engineering
- Manny Marroquin – mixing
- Robin Florent – assistant mixing
- Scott Desmarais – assistant mixing

== Charts ==
Chart performance for "Underdog"
Chart (2017)	Peak position
New Zealand Heatseekers (RMNZ)	8

== Release history ==
Release dates and formats for "Underdog"
Country	Date	Format	Label	Ref.
Various	September 28, 2017	Digital download; streaming	Harvest	
