= Mr Little Jeans =

Norwegian singer-songwriter

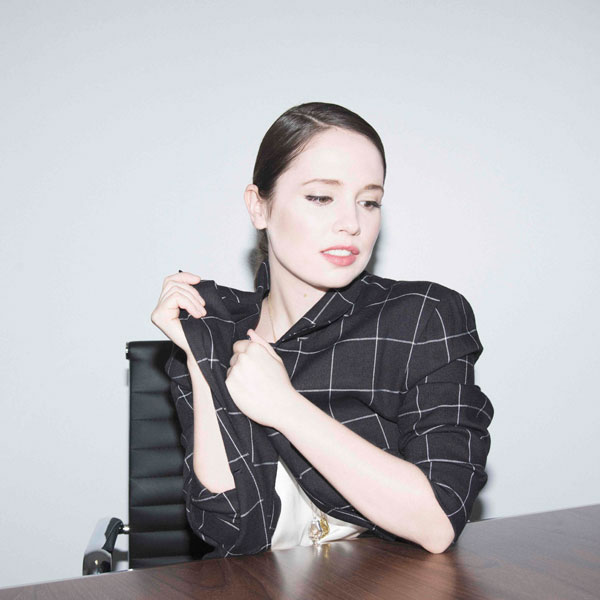

Background information
- Born: Monica Linn Birkenes; Grimstad, Norway
- Genres: Indie pop; synthpop
- Occupation: Musician
- Instrument: Vocals
- Years active: 2009–present
- Labels: Neon Gold Records; Harvest Records
- Website: mrlittlejeans.com

Monica Linn Birkenes, better known by her stage name Mr Little Jeans, is a Norwegian singer-songwriter living in Los Angeles, California. She has released two studio albums: Pocketknife in 2014, and Better Days in 2022.

The pseudonym Mr Little Jeans is inspired by Kumar Pallana's character in Wes Anderson's film Rushmore.

== Early life ==
Birkenes grew up in rural Grimstad Municipality, Norway, the daughter of a shipbuilder and a secretary. In her youth, she performed in town plays and musical events, as well as church choirs and retirement homes. At age 18, she moved to London to study drama, while serving tables to make ends meet.

== Music career ==
After signing to independent label Neon Gold, Birkenes released her first single, "Rescue Song", in 2010. The Guardian compared her sound at the time to Lykke Li, Robyn, and Annie. Later that year, she put out her first EP, titled Angel Birkenes grew in popularity with her 2011 cover of Arcade Fire's "The Suburbs". She often collaborates with Los Angeles producer Tim Anderson, who was instrumental in creating her debut album, Pocketknife. The record was released on Harvest Records on 25 March 2014.

== Discography ==
=== Studio albums ===
Title	Details	Peak chart positions	
Title	Details	AUS	US Heat
Pocketknife	Released: 18 March 2014; Label: Sony Music, Harvest Records; Formats: CD, digital download, streaming, vinyl	40	33
Better Days	Released: 3 June 2022		

=== Extended plays ===
Title	EP details	Peak chart positions
Title	EP details	US Electronic
Angel	Released: 7 June 2010; Label: Neon Gold Records; Format: 7-inch record	—
Good Mistake	Released: 18 February 2014; Label: Harvest; Format: digital download	17
F E V E R S	Released: 21 October 2016; Label: Nettwerk; Format: digital download	—

=== Singles ===
Title	Year	Album
"Angel"	2010	Angel
"Rescue Song"	2010	Pocketknife
"The Suburbs"	2011	Pocketknife
"Runaway"	2012	Pocketknife
"Oh Sailor" (featuring the Silverlake Conservatory of Music Youth Chorale)	2013	Pocketknife
"Good Mistake"	2014	Pocketknife
"Dear Santa"	2014	Non-album singles
"Single Ladies"	2015	Non-album singles
"Waking Up"	2015	F E V E R S
"Fool 4 You"	2015	F E V E R S
"Stitches"	2016	F E V E R S
"Forgetter"	2018	Non-album singles
"Unfollow"	2018	Non-album singles

=== Guest appearances ===
Title	Year	Other artist(s)	Album
"Back to the Start"	2013	—N/a	Iron Man 3 soundtrack
