= Red Warriors (band) =

Japanese rock band

The Red Warriors are a Japanese rock band founded in 1985. The band played themselves in the 1988 film Tokyo Pop, with lead singer Tadokoro playing the love interest of the American girl in Japan.

== Discography ==
- Lesson 1 1986
- Casino Drive 1987
- King's 1988
- King's Rock'n'Roll Show - Live at the Seibu Stadium 1988
- Swingin' Daze 1989
- Red Song 1989
- Red's Box 1992
- The World of the Red Warriors 1996
- Fire Drops 1997
- Live Dogs 2000
- Jupiter Tribus 2000
- Re:Works 2001
- Live Lession 21 2007
