= Trouble Over Tokyo =

- Origin: London, England
- Genres: Alternative; Indielectro; Angstpop
- Years active: 2005–2012
- Labels: Schoenwetter Records; Klein Records; Tokyotron Records
- Members: Christopher Michael Taylor/SOHN Sohn (musician)

Trouble Over Tokyo was the first solo-project of singer/producer Christopher Taylor who has subsequently acquired greater artistic success as SOHN. Having released three albums, Trouble Over Tokyo's music has been described as "Indielectro Angst-Pop" – and is most recognized for Taylor's voice, quirky Alternative/R&B production, and hand-drawn artworks. Taylor was described by UK broadsheet newspaper The Guardian in 2008 as "simultaneously (recalling) Thom Yorke at his most existentially anxious and Justin Timberlake at his most sexually rapacious"., and was listed by The Daily Telegraph 's Neil McCormick as one of ten of "Music's overlooked gems of 2008".

== History ==
Trouble Over Tokyo began as a four-piece Alternative Rock band in 2004, and were a gigging band on the London indie circuit. Whilst recording their debut album, the band dissolved and Taylor went on with the name and website, changing the concept and recording predominantly electronic music in his bedroom. The result of these sessions became Trouble Over Tokyo's debut album 1000 – a 1000 limited edition pressing that Taylor released himself through his label Tokyotron Records. After a chance meeting at a London music venue in 2006, Taylor was invited to play a small tour in Austria – this led to a small cult following that grew quickly. Trouble Over Tokyo was then asked to support Austrian Indie outfit Garish and their 2007 tour, and sold nearly all of the remaining copies of 1000 at these shows. Later that year, Schoenwetter Records, an independent record label in Vienna, released Taylor's second offering Pyramides in Austria. Alternative radio station FM4 embraced the record and made Pyramides album of the week, playing tracks from the album on rotation, and critical acclaim from the press followed.

In 2008, Klein Records released Pyramides in all other territories, to excellent reviews, notably in the UK, Germany and France. Taylor then formed a live band for a one-off tour, featuring members from Velojet, Garish, and UK band The Heart Strings, which toured Austria, Switzerland and Slovenia. In 2010, Taylor released his third album, entitled The Hurricane, featuring some of the musicians from the 2008 live band, in Vienna. It is Trouble Over Tokyo's first studio album.

On 27 April 2010, it was announced by X2 games, makers of the mobile football game X2 Football 2010 for the iPhone/iPod Touch, that an exclusive deal was struck with Trouble Over Tokyo for the game's soundtrack.

In March 2012, Toph Taylor announced the end of his musical project "Trouble Over Tokyo": Despite having been working on a new album, he decided to condense this to the strongest tracks, and bring it out as a final EP entitled Simplify.

In August 2012, he released the two songs "Warnings" and "Oscillate" under the new name SOHN through his SoundCloud page.

== Discography ==
=== Albums ===
Title	Year	Released
1000	2005	Tokyotron Records
Pyramides	2007	Schoenwetter Records (Austrian release)
Pyramides	2008	Klein Records (Worldwide release)
The Hurricane	2010	Schoenwetter Records (Worldwide release)
Simplify (EP)	2012	Tokyotron Records
