= Fuck with Myself =

2016 single by Banks

Single by Banks

from the album The Altar
- Released: July 12, 2016
- Length: 2:55
- Label: Harvest
- Songwriter(s): Jillian Banks; Alexander Shuckburgh; Tim Anderson
- Producer(s): Al Shux

Banks singles chronology
"Better" (2015)	"Fuck with Myself" (2016)	"Gemini Feed" (2016)

Music video
- "Fuck with Myself" on YouTube

"Fuck with Myself" is a song recorded by American singer and songwriter Banks for her second studio album, The Altar (2016). It was released as the album's lead single on July 12, 2016 and it debuted on Zane Lowe's Beats 1 radio show. The song was written by Banks, Alexander Shuckburgh, and Tim Anderson, and produced by the latter two.

== Background ==
Lyrically, Banks sings about her self-love and self-hate. It was the last song she wrote for the album. "There's so many meanings to it", she said of the song. "It could be like, 'I fuck with myself', like, 'I mess with myself more than anybody else.' It could be, 'I fuck with myself', kind of like, 'I'm feeling myself.' It means a lot of different things that I think a lot of people can relate to."

== Music video ==
The music video for "Fuck with Myself" was directed by Philippa Price. It was released on Banks's Vevo channel on July 12, 2016. The video starts off showing a naked Banks dancing in front of a broken mirror. Banks is then seen dancing next to a frighteningly realistic mannequin similar to her head. Banks licks, caresses, hits, and smears the mannequin with lipstick. Next cut shows more dancers wearing a mask of her face dancing around her. The video ends with the singer who lights the mannequin on fire.

== Charts ==
Chart performance for "Fuck with Myself"
Chart (2016)	Peak position
New Zealand Heatseekers (RMNZ)	8
US Hot Rock & Alternative Songs (Billboard)	29
US Rock Digital Songs (Billboard)	39

== Release history ==
Release dates and formats for "Fuck with Myself"
Country	Date	Format	Label	Ref.
Various	July 12, 2016	Digital download; streaming	Harvest	
