= Mind Games (Banks song) =

Single by Banks

from the album The Altar
- Released: August 19, 2016
- Length: 4:49
- Label: Harvest
- Songwriter(s): Jillian Banks; Christopher Taylor; Tim Anderson
- Producer(s): Sohn; Tim Anderson

Banks singles chronology
"Gemini Feed" (2016)	"Mind Games" (2016)	"To the Hilt" (2016)

Audio video
- "Mind Games" on YouTube

"Mind Games" is a song recorded by American singer and songwriter Banks for her second studio album, The Altar (2016). It was released as the album's third single on August 19, 2016. The song was written by Banks, Christopher Taylor, Tim Anderson and produced by the last two.

== Background ==
Lyrically, the song is about singer’s love affair with manipulation, with the line "cause my addiction to these contradictions make it confusing." In the song's chorus Banks sings repetitively "Do you see me now?", matching the dysfunctional romance of the song. Gabriel Aikins from Substream Magazine wrote about the song "is an especially gripping slow-burn. It's powerful and deep in its minimalism, and it will definitely give you chills." The singer wrote on her social networks about the song "I'm excited to share this with you. Writing it was a really important step for me in making this album. It makes me feel exposed putting it into the universe but see me now."

== Critical reception ==
Neil Z. Yeung of AllMusic wrote about the song "When she shifts the gears of pain inward, she lays herself bare with unflinching honesty and vulnerability". Andrew Paschal from PopMatters said that the song "attempts to marry the competing impulses of Banks's sonic personas". Idolator's Stephen Sears wrote "The astonishing 'Mind Games' distills the pure essence of Banks, weaving subtle wit into her conversational lyrics: [You're claiming I'm a handful when you show up all empty handed.] This song belongs on a loop, her misery leading to catharsis as her voice, increasingly pained, wails [Do you see me now?] over and over."

== Charts ==
Chart performance for "Mind Games"
Chart (2016)	Peak position
US Alternative Digital Songs (Billboard)	16

== Release history ==
Release dates and formats for "Mind Games"
Country	Date	Format	Label	Ref.
Various	August 19, 2016	Digital download; streaming	Harvest	
