= Sohn (musician) =

English composer, singer-songwriter, and producer

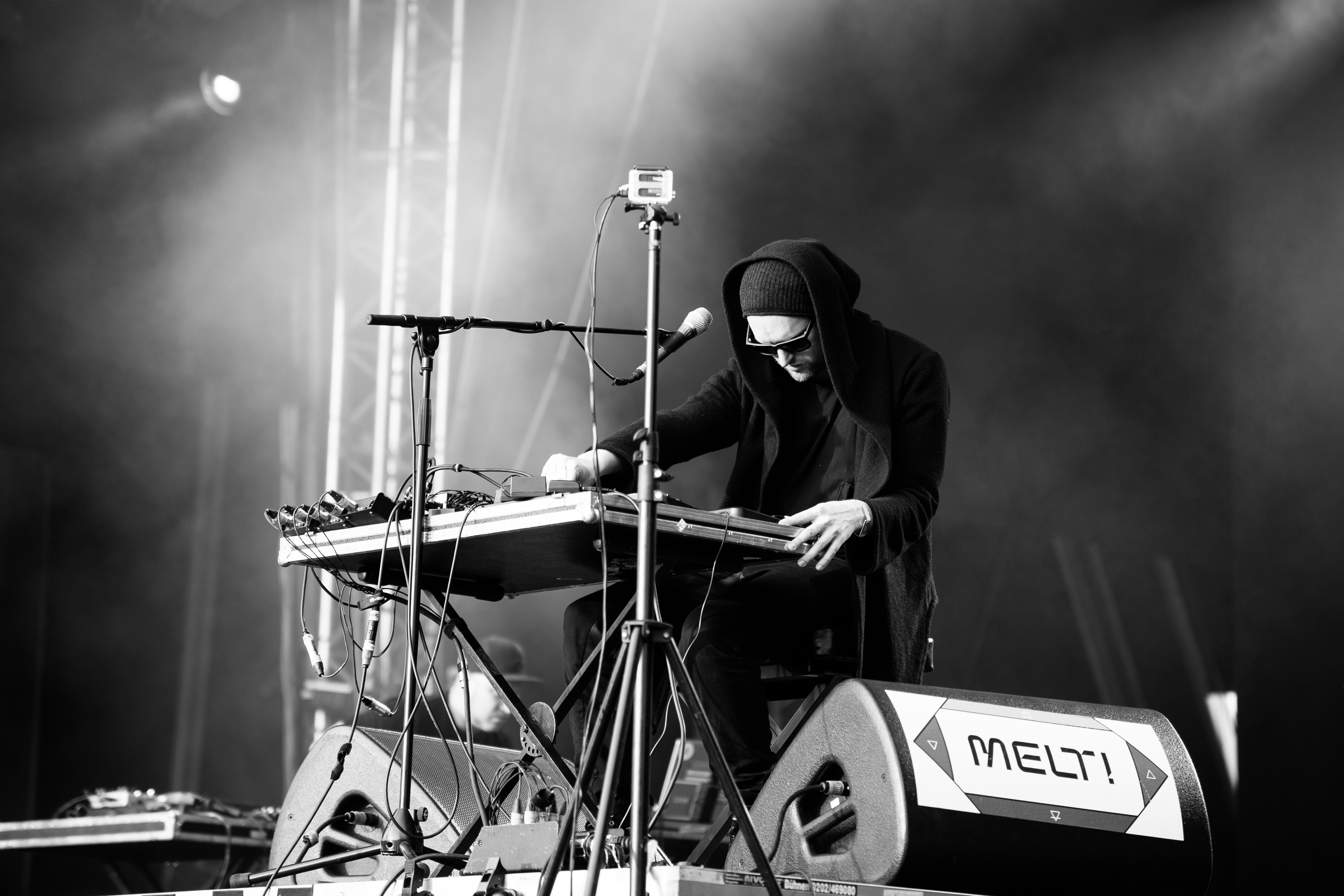
- SOHN performing in 2014

Background information
- Born: Christopher Michael Taylor; 27 August; London, England
- Genres: Ambient pop; alternative R&B; art pop; downtempo; future garage
- Occupations: Singer; songwriter; record producer
- Years active: 2012–present
- Labels: Aesop; 4AD
- Website: sohnmusic.com

Christopher Michael Taylor, professionally known as Sohn (stylised as SOHN), is an English singer, songwriter and record producer. Following the release of the 2012 EP The Wheel by Aesop, he was signed by 4AD. He released his first album, Tremors, on 7 April 2014 followed by Rennen in January 2017 and Trust in November 2022.

== Career ==
Taylor was born in South London and developed an early interest in music. After four albums, he dissolved his successful project Trouble Over Tokyo and reinvented himself as Sohn. In August 2010, he released the first two songs, "Warnings" and "Oscillate", under the Sohn name through his SoundCloud page. A month later, his first EP was announced by the London-based Aesop label. The songs "The Wheel" and "Red Lines" were also streamed online, picking up critical acclaim. The EP The Wheel was released on 5 November 2012 in both digital and vinyl formats. Taylor had been living in Vienna, Austria since 2007.

On 19 April 2013, 4AD announced that it had signed Sohn. This coincided with his first official release through 4AD, "Bloodflows", which Pitchfork described as "a vocal showcase and SOHN's most sorrowful, powerful success yet". and GorillaVsBear mentioned as "simple but mesmerizing and extremely effective video". The single peaked at number one in the Amazing Radio chart on 12 May.

On 11 September 2013, the follow-up track, "Lessons", was published online. Released on limited 12" vinyl on 25 November 2013, the accompanying video was directed by Olivier Groulx and premiered by Dazed & Confused magazine.

Sohn's first album, Tremors, was released in the week of 7 April 2014, with the lead single being "Artifice".

In 2015, Taylor moved to Los Angeles where he worked as a producer for Aquilo, Banks and Kwabs, before moving to Sonoma where he began work on his second album.

In 2015, Taylor released the song "Carry Me Home" as part of the Insurgent soundtrack. The song is played over the ending credits.

In August 2016, the single "Signal" was made available through streaming platforms. It was supported by a video featuring the actress Milla Jovovich. Sohn released a lyric music video of his second single titled "Conrad" on 8 November 2016. The album Rennen was released on 13 January 2017. The tour in support features a live drummer and the vocalist Nylo.

June 2020 saw the release of Sohn's live album, Live with the Metropole Orkest, recorded as a one-off performance in Amsterdam in 2019 with the 54-person-strong Metropole Orkest and conductor Hans Ek.

On 11 May 2022, the single "Figureskating, Neusiedlersee" was released. Sohn issued a second single, titled "Segre", on 13 July 2022. His third studio album, Trust, was released digitally on 2 September 2022 and physically on 4 November 2022.

== Personal life ==
Taylor is married and has three children.

== Discography ==
=== Studio albums ===
Title	Album details	Peak chart positions									
Title	Album details	UK	AUS	AUT	BEL (FL)	BEL (WA)	FRA	GER	IRE	NL	SWI
Tremors	Released: 7 April 2014; Label: 4AD; Formats: CD, LP, digital download	31	60	12	20	75	83	64	83	42	23
Rennen	Released: 13 January 2017; Label: 4AD; Formats: CD, LP, digital download	96	—	9	21	107	162	26	—	56	22
Trust	Released: 2 September 2022; Label: 4AD; Formats: CD, LP, digital download	—	—	—	—	—	—	—	—	—	—
Albadas (Dawn Songs)	Released: 10 October 2025; Label: APM; Formats: CD, LP, digital download	—	—	—	—	—	—	—	—	—	—
"—" denotes a recording that did not chart or was not released in that territory.

=== Live albums ===
Title	Album details
Tremors on Tour – Spotify Live EP	Released 10 June 2014; Label: 4AD; Formats: digital download
Live with the Metropole Orkest	Released: 5 June 2020; Label: 4AD; Formats: LP, digital download

=== EPs ===
Title	Extended play details
The Wheel	Released: 5 November 2012; Label: Aesop; Formats: 12", digital download

=== Singles ===
- "Bloodflows" (2013)
- "Lessons" (2013)
- "Artifice" (2014)
- "The Chase" (2014)
- "Signal" (2016)
- "Conrad" (2016)
- "Rennen" (2016)
- "Hard Liquor" (2017)
- "Red Lines" (2017)
- "The Prestige" (2017)
- "Hue" / "Nil" (2018)
- "Unfold" (2018) (with Olafur Arnalds)
- "Songs to the Siren" (2021)
- "Figureskating, Neusiedlersee" (2022)
- "Segre" (2022)
- "Unwavering" (2024) (with Sandrayati)
- "Oblivion" (2024)

=== Writing and production credits ===
Title	Year	Artist	Album	Credits	Written with:	Produced with:
"Wrong or Right"	2014	Kwabs	Love + War	Co-writer/producer	Kwabena Adjepong	–
"Alibi"	2014	Banks	Goddess	Co-writer/producer	Jillian Banks	–
"Waiting Game"	2014	Banks	Goddess	Co-writer/producer	Jillian Banks	–
"Everything"	2015	Aqualung	10 Futures	Co-writer	Matthew Hales, Nicholas Ruth	–
"My Own"	2015	Kwabs	Love + War	Co-writer/producer	Kwabena Adjepong	–
"Look Over Your Shoulder"	2015	Kwabs	Love + War	Co-writer/producer	Kwabena Adjepong	–
"Human"	2015	Aquilo	Silhouettes	Co-writer/producer	Thomas Higham, Benjamin Fletcher	Aquilo
"Waiting"	2015	Aquilo	Silhouettes	Co-writer	Thomas Higham, Benjamin Fletcher	–
"Gemini Feed"	2016	Banks	The Altar	Co-writer/roducer	Jillian Banks	Chris Spilfogel
"Lovesick"	2016	Banks	The Altar	Additional producer	–	Tim Anderson
"Mind Games"	2016	Banks	The Altar	Co-writer/producer	Jillian Banks, Timothy Anderson	Tim Anderson
"This Is Not About Us"	2016	Banks	The Altar	Co-writer/producer	Jillian Banks, Dacoury Natche	DJ Dahi
"To the Hilt"	2016	Banks	The Altar	Co-writer/producer	Jillian Banks	–
"27 Hours"	2016	Banks	The Altar	Co-writer/producer	Jillian Banks, Ahmed Balshe, Daniel Schofield, Benjamin Diehl, Richard Munoz, Faris Al-Majed, Timothy Anderson	Tim Anderson, DannyBoyStyles, Ben Billions
"Human"	2017	Aquilo	Silhouettes	Co-writer/producer	Thomas Higham, Benjamin Fletcher	Aquilo
"Waiting"	2017	Aquilo	Silhouettes	Co-writer	Thomas Higham, Benjamin Fletcher	–
"Pathetic"	2017	Erik Hassle	Innocence Lost	Co-writer/producer	Kaj Hassle, Nicholas Ruth	Nick Ruth
"Diviner"	2019	Hayden Thorpe	Diviner	Co-writer	Hayden Thorpe	–
"Till Now"	2019	Banks	III	Co-writer/additional producer	Jillian Banks, Jasmine Tadjiky, Brandon John Burton	BJ Burton, Aaron Forbes
"Godless"	2019	Banks	III	Co-producer	–	BJ Burton, Jesse Ward, Aaron Forbes
"Alibi"	2024	Banks	Goddess: Unplugged	Co-writer/co-producer	Jillian Banks	Jillian Banks
"Waiting Game"	2024	Banks	Goddess: Unplugged	Co-writer/co-producer	Jillian Banks	Jillian Banks
"This Is What It Feels Like"	2024	Banks	Goddess: Unplugged	Co-producer	Jamie Woon, Jillian Banks, TJ Carter	Jillian Banks
"Stick"	2024	Banks	Goddess: Unplugged	Co-producer	Jillian Banks, TJ Carter	Jillian Banks, Ryan Lerman
"Fuck Em Only We Know"	2024	Banks	Goddess: Unplugged	Co-producer	Jillian Banks, Orlando Higginbottom	Ryan Lerman, Jillian Banks
"Guillotine"	2025	Banks	Off With Her Head	Co-writer/co-producer	Jillian Banks	Jillian Banks
"Stay"	2025	Banks	Off With Her Head	Co-writer/co-producer	Jillian Banks, Ben Darwish	Jillian Banks
"Off With Her Head"	2025	Banks	Off With Her Head	Co-writer/co-producer	Jillian Banks, Yakob], Kareem James	Jillian Banks, Yakob], Kareem James
"Shifting Waters"	2025	Sandrayati	recall, (EP)	Co-writer/co-producer	Sandrayati Fay	Sandrayati Fay, James Forde Stewart
"La Loba"	2025	Sandrayati	recall, (EP)	Co-writer/co-producer	Sandrayati Fay	Sandrayati Fay, James Forde Stewart
"Wonder"	2025	Sandrayati	recall, (EP)	Co-writer/co-producer	Sandrayati Fay	Sandrayati Fay, James Forde Stewart

=== Remixes ===
Title	Year	Artist
"Ride"	2012	Lana Del Rey
"Help Me Lose My Mind"	2013	Disclosure
"Echelon (It's My Way)"	2013	Angel Haze
Green Garden	2013	Laura Mvula
"Open"	2013	Rhye
"Before I Ever Met You"	2013	BANKS
"Mecca"	2014	Wild Beasts
"Where You Belong"	2015	The Weeknd
"Gone Are the Days"	2016	Honne
"Alaska"	2017	Maggie Rogers
"Forget Tomorrow"	2020	Mighty Oaks
"Deepest Lonely"	2021	Birdy
