= Aron Forbes =

American musician, songwriter, and producer

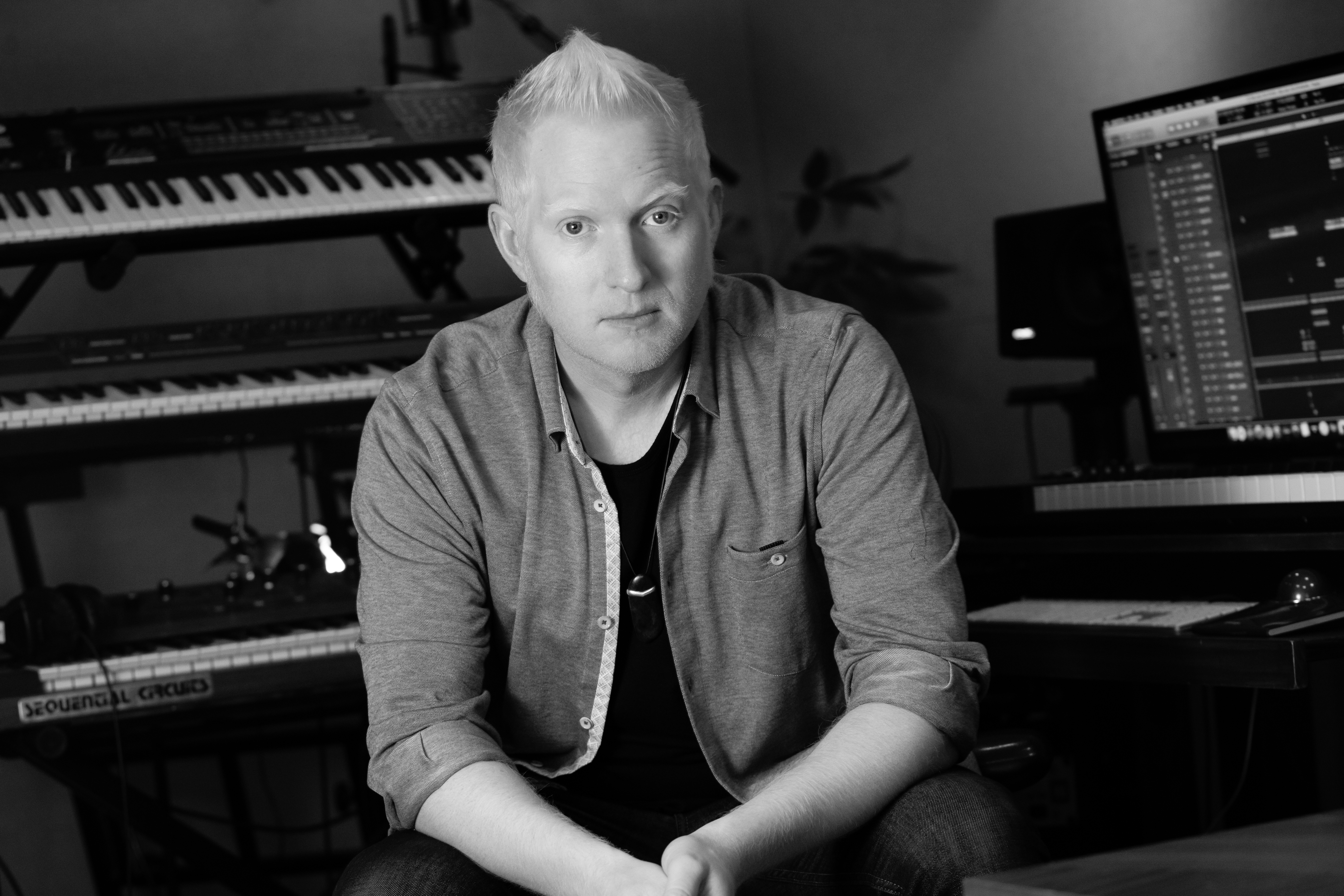
- Forbes in 2019

Background information
- Born: Aron Noah Forbes; January 17, 1985 (age 41); Big Sur, California, United States
- Genres: pop; rock
- Years active: 1998–present
- Website: disneymusicpublishing.com/artists/aronforbes-2/

Aron Noah Forbes (born January 17, 1985) is an American guitarist, producer, and songwriter, known for his collaborations with Halsey, Banks, Billie Eilish, Donna Missal, One Direction, Olivia Rodrigo, Vérité, among others.

== Early life and education ==
Born and raised in Big Sur, California, United States, Forbes began playing guitar at age five. At age 11 he was singing and playing in a blues band he had founded in 1998, The Blue Tones. The band was invited to play at the Apollo Theater on 9 November 2000 and named by Teen People Magazine one of the nation's top three new teen bands.

He graduated from Carmel High School in 2003 and in the same year moved to Los Angeles to attend the USC Thornton School of Music.

== Career ==
=== 2009–2013: The X Factor, One Direction, and other collaborations ===
In 2009, Forbes was asked to music direct and play guitar for Justin Timberlake's Tennman Records artist Esmée Denters. For two years he toured the world opening and playing alongside acts such as Lady Gaga, the Black Eyed Peas and Ne-Yo.

Beginning in 2011, Forbes began playing as the guitarist for The X Factor's US and UK series. That gig led to playing guitar for One Direction on their first US tour and allowed him to begin his journey into the studio to pursue writing and production.

=== 2014–2019: Collaborations with Halsey, BANKS, Billie Eilish, and others ===
Forbes's career as writer and producer began to emerge in 2014. That year, ASCAP named the Mr Little Jeans track "Dear Santa," which Forbes co-wrote, one of its best original holiday songs of the year. In 2015 he was asked by long-time mentor and collaborator Tim Anderson to add production to Halsey's "Drive" from her debut studio album Drive. He also wrote and played guitar on BANKS' song "Someone New" for her debut studio album Goddess.

In 2017 he co-wrote Billie Eilish's RIAA Gold record "Bored," and it was included in the first season and soundtrack of 13 Reasons Why.

In 2015-2016, Forbes worked closely alongside BANKS to create her second studio album The Altar, penning two songs and producing throughout. In 2018, he continued his musical journey with BANKS, writing four songs for her 2019 album III.

In 2016 he worked with VÉRITÉ, Nawas, and FYOHNA, for whom he produced another track in 2019.

Meanwhile, in 2018 he worked as writer and producer with Donna Missal, Mr Little Jeans, COIN, and The Born Love, his own duo with Kevin Daniel, whose single "Badlands" reached the Top 15 on Spotify's Top 50 US Viral Chart, and the Top 10 on Hype Machine.

In 2019 he wrote and produced four more tracks for Mr Little Jeans. Additional credits for the year included writing and producing tracks for Hey Violet's album Crawl and working again with FYOHNA.

== Music direction ==
Staying connected with the stage, Forbes often music directs for artists he collaborates with in the studio. Starting in 2015 Forbes would music direct German alt band Tokio Hotel for their comeback world tour of Feel It All. From 2016 through the present day he has worked with BANKS on her The Altar and III tours. He has music directed for friends Billie Eilish (from the beginning of her career) and FINNEAS. In 2019, Forbes added to his MD roster Harry Hudson, Cyn and Conan Gray.

In 2020 Forbes music directed Olivia Rodrigo's debut performance of "drivers license" on The Tonight Show Starring Jimmy Fallon and Saturday Night Live. Additionally he worked on her Brit Awards performance and her Sour Prom concert film release which he music directed and mixed.

In 2021 he was nominated for two Primetime Emmy Awards, for Music Direction and Sound Mixing, for his work on the Billie Eilish documentary Billie Eilish: The World's a Little Blurry.

== Discography ==
Artist	Song Title	Album/Release Type	Release date	Label	Role/Credit
Vérité	"by now"	Single	2021	AWAL	Producer
Julia Gargano	"Strangers"	Single	2021		Writer, Producer
Ouse feat. Powfu	"Too Many Problems"	Single	2021		Writer, Producer
Billie Eilish	"ilomilo" (Live from the film Billie Eilish: The World's A Little Blurry	Single	2021		Mixer
ILUKA	"Mess"	Single	2021		Writer, Producer
ILUKA	"Get Free"	Single	2021		Writer, Producer
Vérité	"younger women"	Single	2020	AWAL	Producer
Vérité	"i'll take the blame"	Single	2020	AWAL	Producer
Vérité	"Blackout Christmas"	Single	2020	AWAL	Producer
Banks	"Propaganda"	III	2019	Harvest Records	Writer
Banks	"If We Were Made of Water"	III	2019	Harvest Records	Writer
Banks	"Stroke"	III	2019	Harvest Records	Writer, Addl. Production
Banks	"The Fall"	III	2019	Harvest Records	Writer, Addl. Production
Hey Violet	"Close My Eyes"	Single	2019	Capitol	Writer, Producer
Hey Violet	"Crawl"	Album	2019	Capitol	Writer/Producer
Charlotte OC	"Boyfriend"	Single	2019	Neon Gold	Writer, Producer
Charlotte OC	"Hea Lover"	Single	2019	Neon Gold	Writer/Producer
Charlotte OC	"This Pain"	Single	2019	Neon Gold	Writer/Producer
Mr Little Jeans	"FAMILY"	Single	2019	Network	Writer, Producer
Mr Little Jeans	"LOOP"	Single	2019	Network	Writer, Producer
Mr Little Jeans	"New Norm"	Single	2019	Network	Writer, Producer
Donna Missal	"Get Well"	Single	2019	Harvest Records	Writer, Producer
FYOHNA	"Lie Down"	Single	2019		Producer
Gryffin, Elley Duhé	"Tie Me Down (with Elley Duhé)"	Single	2018	Interscope	Writer, Producer
Donna Missal	"Driving"	Single	2018	Harvest Records	Writer, Producer
Donna Missal	"Transformer"		2018	Harvest Records	Writer, Producer
Donna Missal	"Jupiter"	Single	2018	Harvest Records	Writer, Producer
Donna Missal	"Skyline"		2018	Harvest Records	Writer, Producer
Donna Missal	"Girl"	Single	2018	Harvest Records	Producer
Donna Missal	"Metal Man"		2018	Harvest Records	Producer
Donna Missal	"Test My Patience"		2018	Harvest Records	Producer
Donna Missal	"Thrills"		2018	Harvest Records	Producer
Donna Missal	"Keep Lying"		2018	Harvest Records	Producer
Donna Missal	"Don't Say Goodnight"		2018	Harvest Records	Producer
Mr Little Jeans	"Forgeter"	Single	2018	Network	Writer, Producer
Mr Little Jeans	"Unfollow"	Single	2018	Network	Writer, Producer
COIN	"Simple Romance"	Single	2018	Columbia	Producer
The Born Love	"Bandlands"	Single	2018	AWAL	Writer, Producer
The Born Love	"Tempest"	Single	2018	AWAL	Writer, Producer
The Born Love	"Colorful"	Single	2018	AWAL	Writer, Producer
The Born Love	"Strange Days"	Single	2018	AWAL	Writer, Producer
Billie Eilish	"Bored"	Single	2017	Interscope	Writer, Producer
Banks	"Trainwreck"	The Altar	2017	Harvest Records	Writer, Producer
Banks	"Weaker Girl"	The Altar	2017	Harvest Records	Writer, Producer
Gordi	"Long Way"	Reservoir	2017		Add Production
Gordi	"On My Side"	Reservoir	2017		Add Production
A.Chal	"Right Now"	Welcome to GAZI	2016	Interscope	Writer, Producer
Nawas	"Who Are You"	Single	2016		Add Production
VÉRITÉ	"Constant Crush"	Living EP	2016	AWAL	Add Production
FYOHNA	"Ghost Heart"	Single	2016		Writer, Producer
FYOHNA	"Believe You"	Single	2016		Writer, Producer
FYOHNA	"Loved Fiercely"	Single	2016		Writer, Producer
FYOHNA	"Misjudged"	Single	2016		Writer, Producer
Halsey	"Drive"	Badlands	2015	Capitol	Add Production
Mr Little Jeans	"Fool 4 You"	Single	2015	Network	Writer, Producer
Halsey	"Stitches"	Single	2015	Network	Writer, Producer
Mr Little Jeans	"Dear Santa"	Single	2014		Writer
