= The Altar =

Studio album by Banks
- Released: September 30, 2016
- Studio: Westlake (West Hollywood, California) (Note: Tracks 4–8 and 10; vocals on tracks 1, 2 and 10); Spaceship (Los Angeles, California) (Note: Track 2); Werewolf Heart (Los Angeles, California) (Note: Tracks 3–5 and 7–9); Conway (Los Angeles, California) (Note: Track 9); Rodeo (Santa Monica, California) (Note: Track 11)
- Genre: Alternative R&B; electronica
- Length: 44:54
- Label: Harvest
- Producer: Tim Anderson; The Anmls; Ben Billions; DannyBoyStyles; DJ Dahi; Aron Forbes; John Hill; Al Shux; Sohn; Chris Spilfogel

Banks chronology
Goddess (2014)	The Altar (2016)	III (2019)

Singles from The Altar
- 1. "Fuck with Myself" Released: July 12, 2016; 2. "Gemini Feed" Released: August 3, 2016; 3. "Mind Games" Released: August 19, 2016; 4. "To the Hilt" Released: September 16, 2016

The Altar is the second studio album by American singer and songwriter Banks, released on September 30, 2016, by Harvest Records. Banks collaborated with several producers on the album, including Tim Anderson, Sohn, and Al Shux, with whom she worked on her debut studio album, Goddess. The album received generally positive reviews from critics and became her second top 20 in the United States, peaking at number 17 on the Billboard 200. It spawned four singles: "Fuck with Myself", "Gemini Feed", "Mind Games", and "To the Hilt".

== Background ==
On November 4, 2015, Banks released the single "Better", along with its accompanying music video. Banks toured with The Weeknd for a second time, opening for him on his The Madness Fall Tour across North America from November to December 2015. She announced on June 8, 2016, that she had finished work on her second album. On July 29, Banks revealed that the album would be titled The Altar, along with its cover art and release date.

The lead single from the album, "Fuck with Myself", was released on July 12, 2016. Banks premiered the track on Zane Lowe's Beats 1 radio show, where she said it was the last song she wrote for the album. "There's so many meanings to it", she said of the song. "It could be like, 'I fuck with myself', like, 'I mess with myself more than anybody else.' It could be, 'I fuck with myself', kind of like, 'I'm feeling myself.' It means a lot of different things that I think a lot of people can relate to." The album's second single, "Gemini Feed", premiered on Annie Mac's BBC Radio 1 show on August 2, 2016, and was released digitally the following day. "Mind Games" was released as the third single from the album on August 19, 2016, followed by "To the Hilt" on September 16, 2016. A music video for the song "Trainwreck" premiered on January 18, 2017.

== Critical reception ==
Professional ratings
Aggregate scores
Source	Rating
Metacritic	70/100
Review scores
Source	Rating
AllMusic	4/5 stars
Clash	7/10
DIY	4/5 stars
Drowned in Sound	8/10
The Guardian	3/5 stars
Pitchfork	5.1/10
PopMatters	6/10 stars
Q	4/5 stars
Rolling Stone	3/5 stars
Sputnikmusic	4.9/5

The Altar received generally positive reviews from music critics. At Metacritic, which assigns a normalized rating out of 100 to reviews from mainstream publications, the album received an average score of 70, based on 17 reviews. Jamie Milton of DIY magazine wrote that "when going for the jugular, BANKS combines unbending confidence, warts 'n all detail and gigantic choruses in the same move", adding that "The Altar is very close to being a razor-sharp pop blueprint." George Garner of Q magazine called the album "[s]tunning", stating that "Banks has excelled at transforming accrued romantic scarring into mesmeric songcraft" and "The Altar marks a radical intensification of her talents". Neil Z. Yeung of AllMusic opined that "Banks has strengthened her voice—resolutely and with increased production value—in the two years since her debut Goddess." Shahzaib Hussain of Clash viewed The Altar as "more textured and artful than Goddess, BANKS growing into her role as a writer, upholding the sensual melancholia that characterised her debut."

Sputnikmusic commented that "[t]he confidence on this album is inspired, observable, and the clear result of Banks' growth as a songwriter." Kellan Miller of Drowned in Sound noted that Banks is "even more unfiltered and tenacious on The Altar than she was on Goddess" and that she is "perfectly comfortable in her own skin and artistic abilities, and it shows immensely on The Altar". Writing for Rolling Stone, Maura Johnston concluded that "Banks' list of grievances can get wearying, but the music's dour detail is alluring too." Kate Hutchinson of The Guardian described the album as "claustrophobic with try-hardness" and felt that "Banks doesn't sound empowered, she sounds stretched". In a mixed review, Andrew Paschal of PopMatters expressed that "[t]he high points of The Altar are nearly perfect, but these are outnumbered by a massive middle section comprised of unremarkable, uninspired filler." Katherine St. Asaph of Pitchfork found that "The Altar has a lot in common with Goddess, including its fatal flaw: its attempts to position Banks as edgy or dangerous, despite all musical evidence to the contrary."

== Commercial performance ==
The Altar debuted at number 17 on the US Billboard 200 with 14,220 copies sold in pure album sales. The album debuted at number 24 on the UK Albums Chart, selling 3,229 copies in its first week.

== Track listing ==
No.	Title	Writer(s)	Producer(s)	Length
1.	"Gemini Feed"	Jillian Banks; Christopher Taylor	Sohn; Chris Spilfogel^{[b]}	3:25
2.	"Fuck with Myself"	Banks; Alexander Shuckburgh; Tim Anderson	Al Shux	2:55
3.	"Lovesick"	Banks; Nate Mercereau; Derek Taylor	Anderson; Sohn^{[c]}	3:20
4.	"Mind Games"	Banks; C. Taylor; Anderson; Jenna Andrews^{[a]}	Sohn; Anderson	4:49
5.	"Trainwreck"	Banks; Anderson; Dacoury Natche; Aron Forbes; Jesse Rogg	Anderson; DJ Dahi; Forbes^{[c]}	3:24
6.	"This Is Not About Us"	Banks; Natche; C. Taylor	Sohn; DJ Dahi^{[d]}	3:03
7.	"Weaker Girl"	Banks; Anderson; Andrews; Trevor Lawrence Jr.; Forbes	Anderson; Forbes^{[d]}	4:16
8.	"Mother Earth"	Banks; Andrews	Anderson; Forbes^{[d]}	3:56
9.	"Judas"	Banks; Ahmad Balshe; Danny Schofield; Benjamin Diehl; Richard Munoz; Faris Al-Majed; Anderson	DannyBoyStyles; Ben Billions; The Anmls^{[d]}	3:56
10.	"Haunt"	Banks; Natche; Anderson	DJ Dahi	3:42
11.	"Poltergeist"	Banks; John Hill; Anderson	Hill	3:32
12.	"To the Hilt"	Banks; C. Taylor	Sohn	4:36
Total length:				44:54

Digital edition bonus track
No.	Title	Writer(s)	Producer(s)	Length
13.	"27 Hours"	Banks; C. Taylor; Balshe; Schofield; Diehl; Munoz; Al-Majed; Anderson	Anderson; Sohn; DannyBoyStyles; Ben Billions	3:10
Total length:				47:45

=== Notes ===
- On the physical release of the album, "Gemini Feed" contains a piano intro and has a length of 3:25. On the digital version, the song does not include the intro, reducing the track's length to 3:06.
- ^{^[a]} Despite not being credited as a songwriter of "Mind Games" in the album's liner notes, Jenna Andrews is listed as a songwriter by BMI.
- ^{^[b]} signifies a vocal producer
- ^{^[c]} signifies an additional producer
- ^{^[d]} signifies a co-producer

=== Sample credits ===
- "Poltergeist" contains a sample from "Hold On Jus' a Li'l While Longer" by Sounds of Blackness.

== Personnel ==
Credits adapted from the liner notes of The Altar.

=== Musicians ===
- Banks – vocals
- Edmund Finnis – string arrangements (track 8)
- Chris Spilfogel – string conducting (track 8)
- The Section Quartet (track 8)
  - Daphne Chen – violin
  - Eric Gorfain – violin
  - Leah Katz – viola
  - Richard Dodd – cello
- Gary Hines – sample arrangement (track 11)

=== Technical ===
- Sohn – production (tracks 1, 4, 6, 12); recording (track 1); additional production (track 3); engineering, mixing (track 12)
- Chris Spilfogel – vocal recording, vocal production (track 1); recording (tracks 5, 6, 10)
- Seth Perez – vocal recording assistance, vocal production assistance (tracks 1, 2, 10); recording (track 3); recording assistance (tracks 4–9)
- Manny Marroquin – mixing (tracks 1, 2, 4–6, 9)
- Chris Galland – mix engineering (tracks 1, 2, 4–6, 9)
- Jeff Jackson – mix engineering assistance (tracks 1, 2, 4–6, 9)
- Robin Florent – mix engineering assistance (tracks 1, 2, 4–6, 9)
- Al Shux – production, recording (track 2)
- Aron Forbes – vocal recording (tracks 2, 10); recording (tracks 4–9, 11); additional production (track 5); co-production (tracks 7, 8)
- Tim Anderson – production (tracks 3–5, 7, 8); executive production
- Leggy – mixing (tracks 3, 8)
- DJ Dahi – production (tracks 5, 10); co-production (track 6)
- Rich Costey – mixing (tracks 7, 11)
- Martin Cooke – mix engineering assistance (tracks 7, 11)
- Nicolas Fourier – mix engineering assistance (tracks 7, 11)
- Mario Bogatta – mix assistance (tracks 7, 11)
- DannyBoyStyles – production (track 9)
- Ben Billions – production (track 9)
- The Anmls – co-production (track 9)
- Danny Schofield – recording (track 9)
- Sean Tallman – mixing (track 10)
- John Hill – production (track 11)
- Rob Cohen – recording (track 11)
- Banks – executive production
- Pete Lyman – mastering

=== Artwork ===
- Thomas Whiteside – photography
- Sydney Nichols – design

== Charts ==
Chart performance for The Altar
Chart (2016)	Peak position
Australian Albums (ARIA)	8
Belgian Albums (Ultratop Flanders)	44
Belgian Albums (Ultratop Wallonia)	110
Canadian Albums (Billboard)	12
Dutch Albums (Album Top 100)	77
French Albums (SNEP)	118
German Albums (Offizielle Top 100)	56
New Zealand Albums (RMNZ)	18
Scottish Albums (OCC)	45
Swiss Albums (Schweizer Hitparade)	38
UK Albums (OCC)	24
US Billboard 200	17
US Independent Albums (Billboard)	9
US Top Alternative Albums (Billboard)	6

== Release history ==
Release dates and formats for The Altar
Region	Date	Format	Label	Ref.
Various	September 30, 2016	CD; LP; digital download	Harvest	
United Kingdom	September 30, 2016	CD; LP; digital download	Virgin EMI	
