= Gemini Feed =

Single by Banks

from the album The Altar
- Released: August 3, 2016
- Studio: Westlake; (West Hollywood, California)
- Genre: Electronic; R&B
- Length: 3:06
- Label: Harvest
- Songwriter(s): Jillian Banks; Christopher Taylor
- Producer(s): Sohn; Chris Spilfogel (vocal)

Banks singles chronology
"Fuck with Myself" (2016)	"Gemini Feed" (2016)	"Mind Games" (2016)

Music video
- "Gemini Feed" on YouTube

"Gemini Feed" is a song recorded by American singer and songwriter Banks for her second studio album, The Altar (2016). It was released as the album's second single on August 3, 2016, and it debuted on Annie Mac's BBC Radio 1 show. The song was written by Banks and Sohn and produced by the latter, with vocal production by Chris Spilfogel.

== Music video ==
The music video for "Gemini Feed" was directed by Philippa Price. It was released on Banks's Vevo channel on August 16, 2016. The video starts with a close-up of Banks on a futuristic throne, her eyes are covered in jewels. She sits atop a neon lit throne with a golden snake's tongue dangling from her lips. This regal image is contrasted with two interlocking vignettes in which Banks' two sides, one dressed in black, while the other dressed in white, writhe against each other while wrapped up in ropes.

== Charts ==
Chart performance for "Gemini Feed"
Chart (2016)	Peak position
Australia (ARIA)	86
New Zealand Heatseekers (RMNZ)	4
US Hot Rock & Alternative Songs (Billboard)	25

== Release history ==
Release dates and formats for "Gemini Feed"
Country	Date	Format	Label	Ref.
Various	August 3, 2016	Digital download; streaming	Harvest	
