= Better (Banks song) =

Single by Banks
- Released: November 4, 2015
- Length: 3:06
- Label: Harvest
- Songwriters: Jillian Banks; Peder Losnegård
- Producer: Lido

Banks singles chronology
"Beggin for Thread" (2014)	"Better" (2015)	"Fuck with Myself" (2016)

Music video
- "Better" on YouTube

"Better" is a song recorded by American singer and songwriter Banks. It was released as single on November 4, 2015. The song was written by Banks, Peder Losnegård, and produced by the latter two.

== Background ==
In the song, Banks portrays a woman who tries to convince her potential partner that she can love him better than his actual girlfriend, with the lines "I can love you better than she can". The singer said that the song is "like me unleashing a growl." Sydney Gore from Nylon commented, "even though she’s singing from a place of heartbreak, she makes it sound so seductive [...] it’s like being the witness of something tragic, but you can’t bring yourself to look away because there’s an unspoken element of beauty about it."

== Music video ==
The music video for "Better" was directed by James Mountford. It was released on Banks's Vevo channel on November 4, 2015. The video features Banks dressed in gold foil and an unknown naked body arching up and down.

== Charts ==
Chart performance for "Better"
Chart (2016)	Peak position
Australia (ARIA)	112
US Hot Rock & Alternative Songs (Billboard)	39

== Release history ==
Release dates and formats for "Better"
Country	Date	Format	Label	Ref.
Various	November 4, 2015	Digital download; streaming	Harvest	
