= Banks (singer) =

American singer (born 1988)

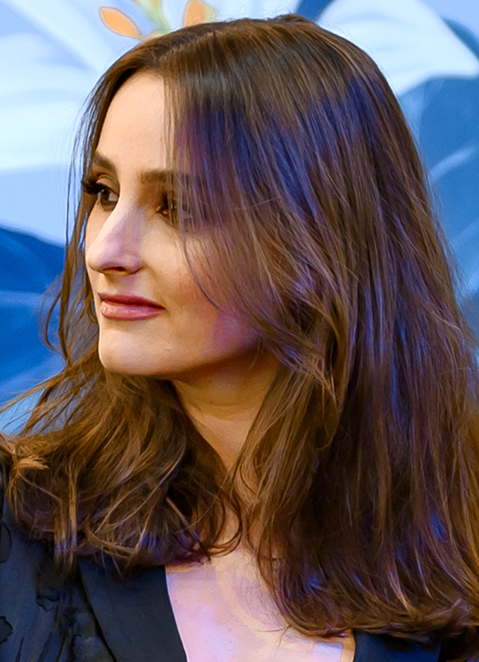
- Banks in 2019
- Born: Jillian Rose Banks; June 16, 1988 (age 38); Orange County, California, U.S.
- Education: University of Southern California
- Occupations: Singer; songwriter
- Years active: 2011–present
- Spouse: Drew Snider (m. 2025)
- Children: 1
- Musical career
- Genres: Electronica; pop; downtempo; R&B
- Instrument: Vocals
- Works: Discography
- Labels: Iamsound; Good Years; Harvest; Capitol; AWAL; ADA
- Website: hernameisbanks.com

Jillian Rose Banks (born June 16, 1988), known mononymously as Banks (often stylized in all caps), is an American singer and songwriter. Following the release of two extended plays—Fall Over and London—in 2013, she signed with Harvest Records to release her debut studio album, Goddess (2014). It was met with positive critical reception and peaked at number 12 on the Billboard 200, while its single, "Beggin for Thread" received platinum certification by the Recording Industry Association of America (RIAA). Her second and third studio albums, The Altar (2016) and III (2019) were met with similar success, peaking at numbers 17 and 21 respectively on the chart; the latter saw her furthest critical acclaim. After departing Harvest Records, she released her fourth studio album Serpentina independently in 2022. Exploring a more experimental sound than her previous work, it achieved modest commercial success but received favorable reviews from music critics. It was followed by her fifth studio album Off with Her Head in 2025.

== Early life and education ==
Jillian Rose Banks was born on June 16, 1988, in Orange County, California. Banks moved to Los Angeles when she was one or two years old and lived in Tarzana, an affluent neighborhood in the San Fernando Valley. She started writing songs at the age of 15 and taught herself piano when she received a keyboard from a friend to help her through her parents' divorce. She says she "felt very alone and helpless. I didn't know how to express what I was feeling or who to talk to." She later enrolled to study psychology at the University of Southern California (USC), where she wrote a thesis on the children of divorced parents, eventually earning a bachelor's degree in psychology.

== Career ==
=== 2013–2014: Breakthrough and Goddess ===
During Banks' time at USC she was put in contact with DJ Yung Skeeter, who offered to manage her and brought her to British label Good Years Recordings. After posting a track called "Before I Ever Met You" on a private SoundCloud page in February 2013, the song ended up being played by DJ Zane Lowe on BBC Radio 1. Banks released her debut extended play (EP), Fall Over, internationally in March 2013 by Good Years Recordings. Billboard called her a "magnetic writer with songs to obsess over." Her second EP, London, was released in September 2013 by Harvest Records and Good Years Recordings to positive reviews from music critics. In an interview after the debut of her first album she posted her phone number on her social media accounts to be closer to her fans and have a more intimate connection to all of them. Her song "Waiting Game" from the EP was featured in the 2013 Victoria's Secret holiday commercial.

In late 2013, she received nominations for awards from both the BBC and MTV. She was nominated for a Sound of... award by the BBC and a Brand New Nominee by MTV. She was included on Shazam's list of "2014 Acts to Watch", as well as on iTunes' list of "New Artists for 2014". Banks was artist of the week for Vogue in August 2013 where they wrote that her songs "perfectly capture a feeling of being lost and powerless in the world." Banks has been tipped by several media outlets as the artist to watch in 2014, including Spin listing London as one of the "50 Albums You Gotta Hear in 2014" and being named as one of the artists under Spotify's Spotlight for 2014. Additional accolades came from The Boston Globe, Fuse, and The Huffington Post.

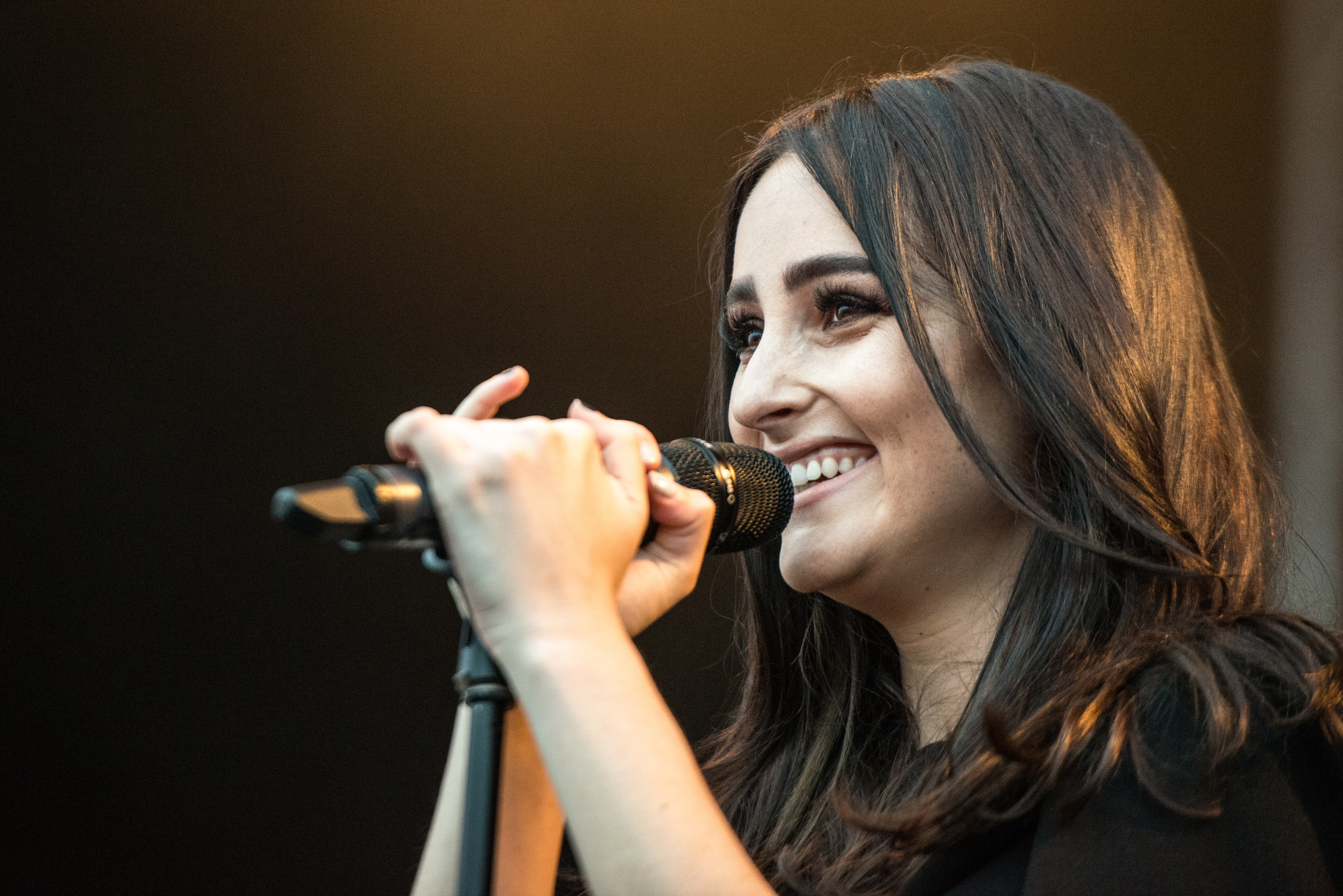
Banks performing at Roskilde Festival 2014

Banks was the opening act for Canadian singer the Weeknd during his fall 2013 tour, supporting him in both the United States and the United Kingdom. After finishing the tour with The Weeknd, she announced her own tour which began in the United Kingdom during March 2014. Banks was also a featured performer at the Coachella festival, taking place in April 2014, Bonnaroo and Open'er Festival in July 2014. In January 2015, Banks was part of the lineup for the 2015 St. Jerome's Laneway Festival, which toured Adelaide, Auckland, Brisbane, Detroit, Fremantle, Melbourne, Singapore and Sydney. On August 7, 2014, Banks made her television debut on Jimmy Kimmel Live!, performing "Beggin for Thread" and "Waiting Game".

Her debut album, Goddess, was released on September 5, 2014, and charted within the top 20 of several countries, including the UK, Australia, Germany, New Zealand and Sweden. In the US, the album debuted at number 12 on the Billboard 200, selling 25,000 copies in its first week of release. It received positive reviews from critics, who praised her sonic ambition and the album's raw sound. It holds a score of 74 out of 100 on Metacritic. The album was supported by the release of four singles: "Brain", "Goddess", "Drowning", and "Beggin for Thread". "Drowning" peaked at number 48 on Billboard's Rock Digital Songs chart, while "Beggin for Thread" reached number 11 on Billboard's Alternative Songs chart, and numbers 80 and 64 in Australia and Germany, respectively.

The track "Waiting Game" was featured in the film Divergent, which was released in March 2014. Along with "Waiting Game", "You Should Know Where I'm Coming From" was featured in the October 9, 2014, episode of Grey's Anatomy, while the track "Goddess" was featured in the March 12, 2015, episode. "You Should Know Where I'm Coming From" was also featured on the ninth episode of Red Band Society. Her single "Beggin' for Thread" was featured in the third episode of the second season of The Originals. In June 2017, "Waiting Game" was used in the official trailer for Netflix's psychological thriller series Gypsy.

=== 2015–2017: The Altar ===
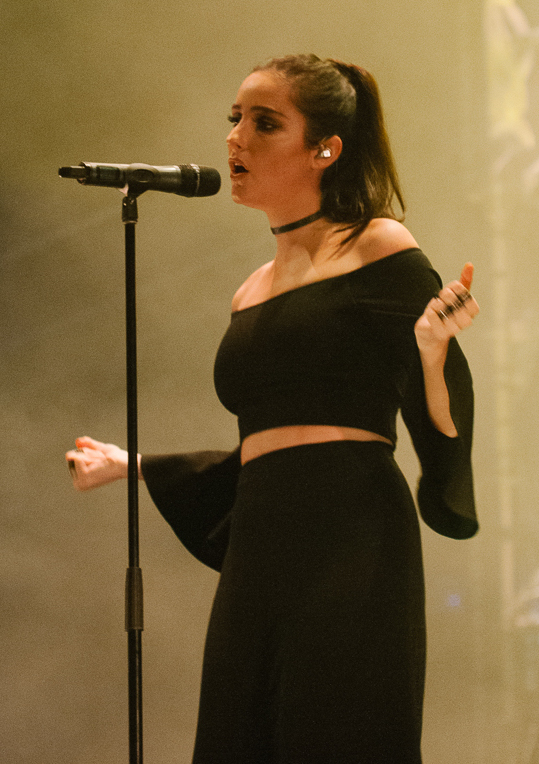
Banks performing at the Laneway Festival Singapore in 2015

On November 4, 2015, Banks released the single "Better", along with its accompanying music video. Banks toured with The Weeknd for a second time, opening for him on his The Madness Fall Tour across North America from November to December 2015. She announced on June 8, 2016, that she had finished work on her second album.

On July 12, 2016, Banks released "Fuck with Myself" as the lead single from her second studio album, titled The Altar. She premiered the track on Zane Lowe's Beats 1 radio show, where she noted it was the last song she wrote for the album. "There's so many meanings to it", she said of the song. "It could be like, 'I fuck with myself', like, 'I mess with myself more than anybody else.' It could be, 'I fuck with myself', kind of like, 'I'm feeling myself.' It means a lot of different things that I think a lot of people can relate to." In an interview for Noisey, Vice's music channel, Banks describes her conflict between self-criticism and self-love as the inspiration behind the track. The song received acclaim from music critics, and reached 29 on the US Rock Songs chart.

The second single from the album, "Gemini Feed", was released on August 2, 2016, and premiered on Annie Mac's BBC Radio 1 show. The song peaked at number 25 on the US Rock Songs chart. The album's third single, "Mind Games", was released on August 19, 2016, followed by "To the Hilt" on September 16, 2016.

The Altar was released on September 30, 2016. The album debuted at number 17 on the US Billboard 200 with 14,220 copies sold in pure album sales, and at number 24 on the UK Albums Chart, selling 3,229 copies in its first week. The album also debuted at number eight in Australia and number 12 in Canada. The album received generally positive reviews from critics; it has a score of 70 on Metacritic.

A music video for "Trainwreck" was released on January 18, 2017. On February 24, 2017, Banks embarked on "The Altar Tour" in support of her sophomore album. It consisted of 68 dates and concluded on November 16, 2017. On April 7, 2017, Banks released the single "Crowded Places", which was featured in the penultimate episode of the HBO series Girls on April 9. Around this time, a collection of unreleased virtual reality experiences called "Three Points to the Recollection of My Future" was produced with Director Jenn Duong. The project was described as "an intense undertaking" that turned "various songs by the singer into a poetic, dance-driven interactive experience, which is an interesting experiment with the music video format."

Another single, titled "Underdog", was released on September 28, 2017. The track was premiered on Lowe's Beats 1 radio show. On November 14, Banks' collaboration with 6lack, "In Between", was unveiled as one of the three new tracks to celebrate the one-year anniversary of 6lack's debut album, Free 6lack. In 2018, "In Between" and "Poltergeist", a track from The Altar, were both featured on the soundtrack of the fifth season of Power.

=== 2019–2020: III ===
In December 2018, Banks said she was working on an album to be released in 2019. On April 29, 2019, Banks released a new single titled "Gimme". The song debuted as Zane Lowe's World Record on Apple Music's Beats 1. On June 11, 2019, Banks released another single, "Look What You're Doing To Me", featuring Francis and the Lights, which she revealed is about falling and being in love. The final single from the album, "Contaminated", was released on July 10. Her third studio album, III, was released on July 12, 2019. Banks describes the album as her transformation from a naive, hopeful romantic into a wise woman. Banks embarked on The III Tour on September 3 in support of the album.

=== 2021–2023: Serpentina ===
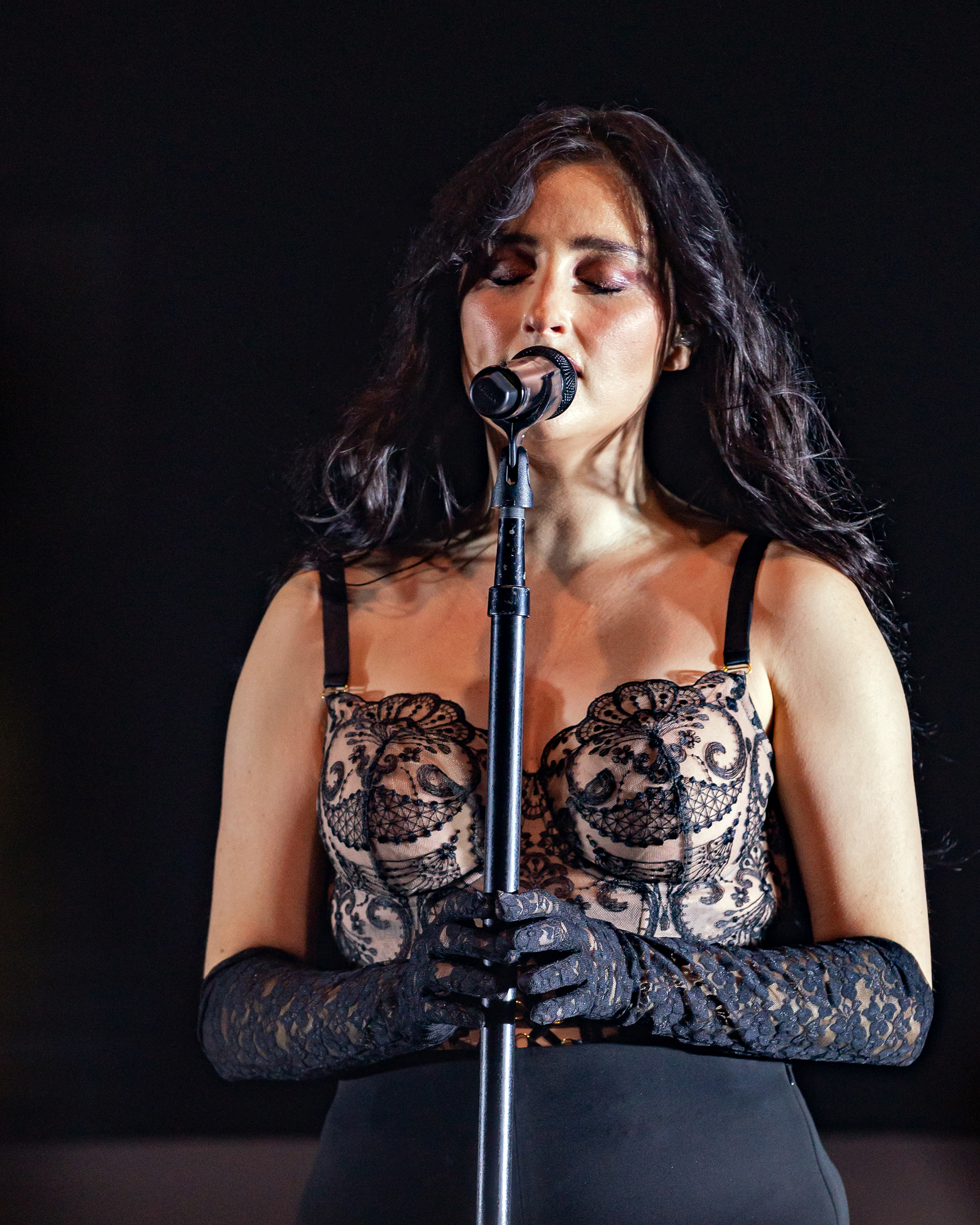
Banks performing at the Hollywood Palladium in 2022

In June 2021, Banks teased a song titled "The Devil" for an upcoming album. Written and produced by Banks, with additional production by Al Shux and Jeff "Gitty" Gitelman, the song and its accompanying music video—co-directed by Banks and Jenna Marsh—were released on June 16; it marked her first release as an independent artist. On August 25, she released "Skinnydipped" as the second single from her fourth album. The song is about "moving onward, finding her self-worth, and no longer drowning in toxic relationships". Co-directed by Banks and Michael Stine, the music video features the singer in jewelry from Bulgari's "Serpenti" collection, echoing the snake motif "represent[ative] of rebirth and shedding one's skin" used in her imagery. Her fourth studio album Serpentina was released on April 8, 2022.

In 2022, Banks shared drawings and poems from her book, Generations of Women from the Moon (2019) at UTA Artist Space in Los Angeles.

=== 2024–present: Goddess anniversary and Off with Her Head ===
On September 5, 2024, the tenth anniversary of her debut album Goddess, Banks announced three shows in London, Los Angeles, and New York City at small venues where she had performed when the album was released. The shows took place from October 21 to 25. She also released Goddess: Unplugged featuring acoustic versions of 10 tracks from the album on December 13, 2024.

On October 18, 2024, Banks released "I Hate Your Ex-Girlfriend" featuring American rapper Doechii as the lead single from her fifth studio album Off with Her Head. It was followed by "Best Friends" on November 22, 2024, and "Love Is Unkind" on January 17, 2025. Off with Her Head was released on February 28, 2025.

== Artistry ==
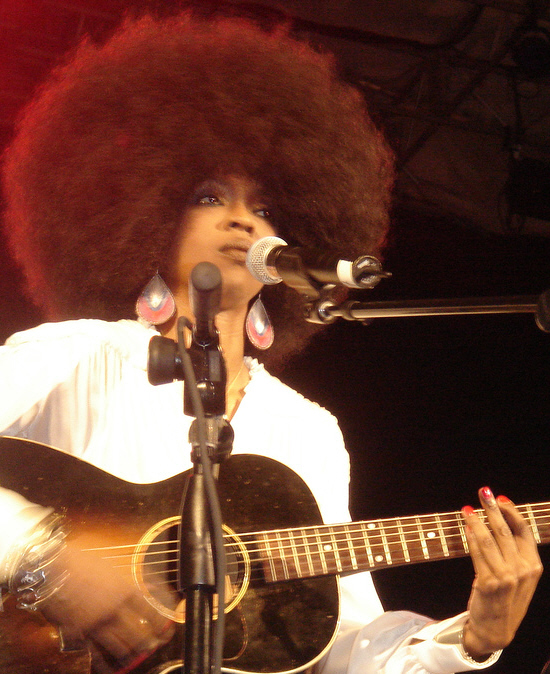
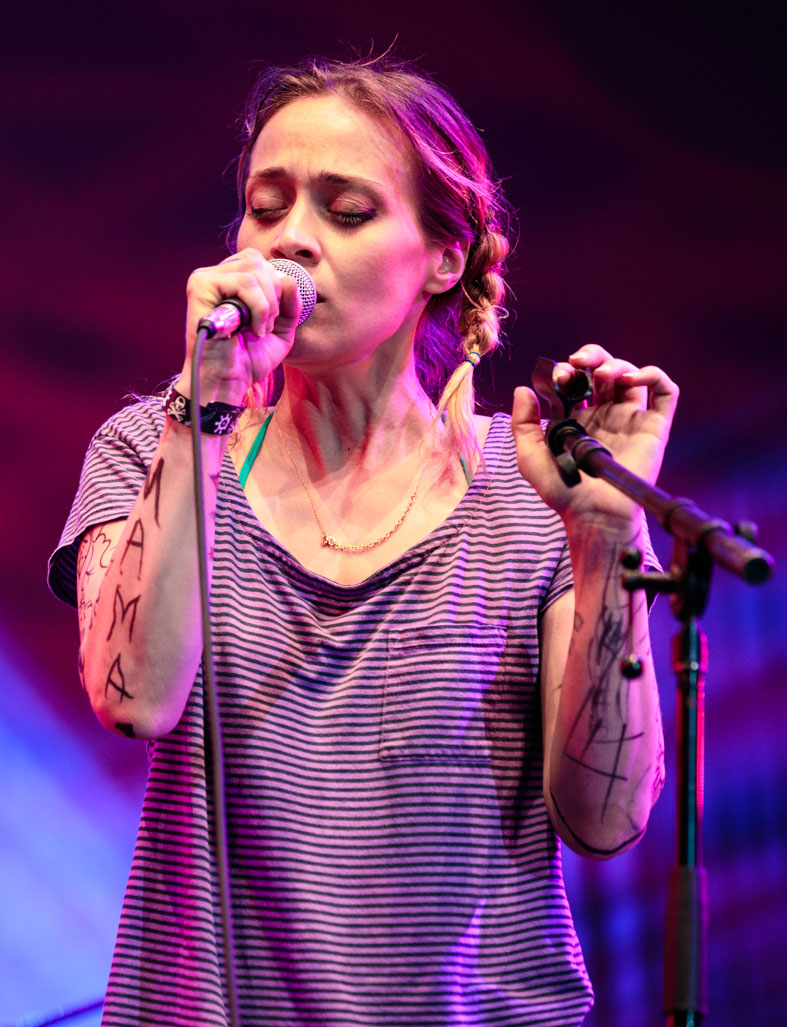
Banks named Lauryn Hill (left) and Fiona Apple (right) as her primary influences.

Banks' music draws from a variety of genres, primarily electronic music or "electronica", falling under genres such as downtempo, although her music also incorporates various sub-genres of pop and R&B, such as alternative pop, alternative R&B, avant-pop, downtempo pop, electropop, and synth-pop, often with hip-hop undertones. Her sound has received comparisons to Ellie Goulding, the Weeknd, and Aaliyah, although she cites Lauryn Hill and Fiona Apple as her biggest influences. She says that music helps her release her emotions and, for that reason, kept her music private while she earned her bachelor's degree in psychology. Her vocals have frequently been described as "Aaliyah-like", in addition to Billboard noting that "her rhapsodic voice possesses a frail vulnerability and recalls singers like Feist and Erykah Badu."

== Public image ==
Banks' reluctance to use social media is often noted by journalists. Although she has stated she lets her "management run that stuff", she did give out her telephone number on her Facebook fanpage. She has since become more active on her Instagram and Twitter accounts.

== Personal life ==
Banks has stated that she is "not religious at all", though she has described herself as "very spiritual" and has said on several occasions that she considers music to be her religion. In 2020, she was diagnosed with Hashimoto's disease. She became engaged to American lacrosse player Drew Snider in March 2024 and they were married in August 2025. In December 2025, she announced that she was expecting her first child. She gave birth to a daughter on April 16, 2026.

== Bibliography ==
- Generations of Women from the Moon (2019)

== Discography ==
- Goddess (2014)
- The Altar (2016)
- III (2019)
- Serpentina (2022)
- Off with Her Head (2025)

== Tours ==
Headlining

- The Goddess Tour (2014–2015)
- The Altar Tour (2017)
- The III Tour (2019)
- The Serpentina Tour (2022)
- Off With Her Head Tour (2025)

Supporting

- The Weeknd – Kiss Land Fall Tour (2013)
- The Weeknd – The Madness Fall Tour (2015)
- Lana Del Rey - UK and Ireland Tour (2025)

== Awards and nominations ==
Year	Organization	Category	Nominee	Result
2014	MTV	Brand New Nominee	Banks	Nominated
2013	BBC	Sound of 2014	Banks	Third
