= Tim Anderson (musician) =

American musician, songwriter, and producer

- Also known as: Timmy the Terror
- Born: 25 June 1977 (age 48)
- Origin: California
- Genres: Alternative; indie pop; electropop; synthpop; rock
- Occupations: Musician, record producer, songwriter
- Years active: 2003-present

Tim Anderson, sometimes referred to as Timmy The Terror, (born 25 June 1977) is an American musician, songwriter, and producer. Based in Los Angeles, he was a co-founding member of dance/garage/power pop-punk band Ima Robot (alongside Edward Sharpe). As a producer and songwriter, he has worked with many artists including Christina Aguilera, Banks, Solange Knowles Halsey, Twenty One Pilots, Mr. Little Jeans, Youngblood Hawke, Donna Missal, Billie Eilish, and Charlotte OC. In 2015, Anderson produced "Message Man" on Twenty One Pilots' album Blurryface, which debuted at number one on the Billboard Top 200 (selling 147,000 copies in its first week) and is certified Gold. Anderson is signed as a songwriter to EMI Music Publishing.

Anderson founded the boutique record label Werewolf Heart Records, a collective with Ryan Gosling and Zach Shields. The label released records for Ima Robot, The Goat and the Occasional Others, and Dead Man's Bones.

He has composed a variety of film and TV scores including BreakPoint and Suits.

Anderson also serves as an A&R executive and staff producer at Harvest Records.

== Selected discography ==
Year	Artist	Album	Track	Label	Producer	Writer
2011	Ima Robot	Another Man's Treasure	All songs	Werewolf Heart	check	check
2011	Zowie	Bite Back - Single	"Bite Back"	Sony Australia	check	check
2011	Zowie	Bite Back - Single	"Nasty"	Sony Australia	check	check
2011	Mike Taylor	In The Stars	"Perfect"	Epic Records	check	check
2012	Solange Knowles	Losing You EP	"Sleep In The Park"	Terrible Records	check	check
2012	Solange Knowles	True EP	"Locked In Closets	Terrible Records		check
2012	Erik Hassle	We Dance	"One Big Memory"	TEN	check	check
2012	Sam Sparro	Return To Paradise	"Yellow Orange Rays"	EMI Australia	check	check
2013	Youngblood Hawke	Wake Up	"Forever"	Universal Republic	check	check
2013	Youngblood Hawke	Wake Up	"Rootless"	Universal Republic	check	check
2013	Youngblood Hawke	Wake Up	"Danny Boy"	Universal Republic	check	check
2013	Youngblood Hawke	Wake Up	"In Our Blood"	Universal Republic	check	check
2013	Kate Pierson	Guitars and Microphones	"Throw Down the Roses"	Lazy Meadow Music LLC	check	check
2013	Kate Pierson	Guitars and Microphones	"Mister Sister"	Lazy Meadow Music LLC	check	check
2013	Kate Pierson	Guitars and Microphones	"Guitars and Microphones"	Lazy Meadow Music LLC	check	check
2013	Kate Pierson	Guitars and Microphones	"Crush Me With Your Love"	Lazy Meadow Music LLC	check	check
2013	Kate Pierson	Guitars and Microphones	"Bottoms Up"	Lazy Meadow Music LLC	check	check
2013	Kate Pierson	Guitars and Microphones	"Matrix"	Lazy Meadow Music LLC	check	check
2013	Kate Pierson	Guitars and Microphones	"Time Wave Zero"	Lazy Meadow Music LLC	check	check
2013	Kate Pierson	Guitars and Microphones	"Bring Your Arms"	Lazy Meadow Music LLC	check	check
2013	Kate Pierson	Guitars and Microphones	"Wolves"	Lazy Meadow Music LLC	check	check
2013	Kate Pierson	Guitars and Microphones	"Pulls You Under"	Lazy Meadow Music LLC	check	check
2013	Solange Knowles	Saint Heron	"Cash In”	Saint Records	check	check
2013	Dizzee Rascal	The Fifth	"Going Crazy"	Island Records	check	check
2013	Dizzee Rascal	The Fifth	"Life Keeps Moving On"	Island Records	check	check
2013	Dizzee Rascal	The Fifth	"Watch Your Back"	Island Records	check	check
2013	Charlotte OC	Colour My Heart EP	"Colour My Heart"	Stranger Records	check	check
2013	Charlotte OC	Colour My Heart EP	"Hangover"	Stranger Records	check	check
2014	Banks	Goddess	"Beggin For Thread”	Harvest/Capitol	check	check
2014	Banks	Goddess	"Change"	Harvest/Capitol	check	check
2014	Banks	Goddess	"Drowning"	Harvest/Capitol	check	
2014	Charlotte OC	Strange	"Strange"	Harvest	check	check
2014	Mr. Little Jeans	Pocketknife	"Runaway"	Harvest/Capitol	check	check
2014	Mr. Little Jeans	Pocketknife	"Rescue Song"	Harvest/Capitol	check	check
2014	Mr. Little Jeans	Pocketknife	"Oh Sailor"	Harvest/Capitol	check	check
2014	Mr. Little Jeans	Pocketknife	"Good Mistake"	Harvest/Capitol	check	check
2014	Mr. Little Jeans	Pocketknife	"Lady Luck"	Harvest/Capitol	check	check
2014	Mr. Little Jeans	Pocketknife	"Heaven Sent"	Harvest/Capitol	check	check
2014	Mr. Little Jeans	Pocketknife	"The Suburbs"	Harvest/Capitol	check	
2014	Mr. Little Jeans	Pocketknife	"The Haunted"	Harvest/Capitol	check	
2014	Mr. Little Jeans	Non-album single	"Dear Santa"	Harvest/Capitol	check	
2014	The Preatures		"Better Than It Ever Could Be”	Harvest	check	
2015	ASTR	Homecoming EP	"Invincible"	300 Entertainment	check	check
2015	Halsey	Badlands	"Hurricane"	Astralwerks/Capitol	check	check
2015	Halsey	Badlands	"Drive"	Astralwerks/Capitol	check	check
2015	Twenty One Pilots	Blurryface	"Message Man"	Fueled By Ramen	check	
2015	Wynter Gordon	Five Needle EP	"Against The Time"	Capitol		check
2015	Wynter Gordon	Five Needle EP	"World On Fire"	Capitol	check	check
2015	Wynter Gordon	Five Needle EP	"Higher"	Capitol	check	check
2015	Wynter Gordon	Kitty Cash's Love The Free Pt 2: The Mixtape	"The Hard Way"		check	check
2016	Dia Frampton	Non-album single	"Golden Years"	Nettwerk		check
2016	VÉRITÉ	Living EP	"Constant Crush"	Kobalt	check	check
2016	Banks	The Altar	"Love Sick"	Harvest/Capitol	check	
2016	Banks	The Altar	"Mind Games" (co-prod w/ Sohn)	Harvest/Capitol	check	
2016	Banks	The Altar	"Trainwreck" (co-prod w/ DJ Dahi)	Harvest/Capitol	check	
2016	Banks	The Altar	"Weaker Girl"	Harvest/Capitol	check	
2016	Banks	The Altar	"Mother Earth"	Harvest/Capitol	check	
2016	Banks	The Altar	"Fuck With Myself"	Harvest/Capitol	check	check
2016	Banks	The Altar	"Poltergeist"	Harvest/Capitol	check	check
2016	Banks	The Altar	"Haunt"	Harvest/Capitol	check	check
2016	Banks	The Altar	"Judas"	Harvest/Capitol	check	check
2016	Banks	The Altar	"27 Hours"	Harvest/Capitol	check	check
2017	VÉRITÉ	Somewhere In Between	"Death of Me"	Kobalt	check	check
2017	Billie Eilish	13 Reasons Why	"Bored"	Interscope	check	check
2017	Banks	Non-album single	"Crowded Places"	Harvest/Capitol	check	check
2017	Mr. Little Jeans	F E V E R S	"Stitches"	Nettwerk	check	check
2017	Mr. Little Jeans	F E V E R S	"Waking Up"	Nettwerk	check	check
2017	Mr. Little Jeans	F E V E R S	"Fool 4 U"	Nettwerk	check	check
2017	Corey Harper	Non-album single	"Favorite Part of Loving You"	Tuxedo Music		check
2017	Gordi	Reservoir	"On My Side"	Jagjaguwar	check	
2017	Charlotte OC	Careless People	"River"	Harvest	check	
2017	Charlotte OC	Careless People	"Running Back To You"	Harvest	check	
2017	Charlotte OC	Careless People	"By Your Side"	Harvest	check	
2017	Charlotte OC	Careless People	"Choice"	Harvest	check	
2017	Charlotte OC	Careless People	"Higher"	Harvest	check	
2017	Charlotte OC	Careless People	"I Want Your Love"	Harvest	check	
2017	Charlotte OC	Careless People	"In Paris"	Harvest	check	
2017	Charlotte OC	Careless People	"Darkest Hour"	Harvest	check	
2017	Charlotte OC	Careless People	"Where It Stays"	Harvest	check	
2017	Charlotte OC	Careless People	"Shell"	Harvest	check	check
2017	Charlotte OC	Careless People	"Blackout"	Harvest	check	check
2017	Nawas	Trouble	"Galaxy"	Harvest	check	check
2017	Nawas	Trouble	"Who Are You"	Harvest	check	check
2018	Donna Missal	This Time	"Girl"	Harvest/Capitol	check	check
2018	Donna Missal	This Time	"Driving"	Harvest/Capitol	check	check
2018	Donna Missal	This Time	"Metal Man"	Harvest/Capitol	check	check
2018	Donna Missal	This Time	"Thrills"	Harvest/Capitol	check	check
2018	Donna Missal	This Time	"Skyline"	Harvest/Capitol	check	check
2018	Donna Missal	This Time	"Transformer"	Harvest/Capitol	check	check
2018	Donna Missal	This Time	"Don't Say Goodnight"	Harvest/Capitol	check	check
2018	T-E-E-D	Non-album single	"Leave A Light On"	Independent	check	check

Source: Discogs
