= Holding Back =

Single by Banks

from the album Serpentina
- Released: February 25, 2022
- Length: 3:53
- Label: AWAL; Her Name Is Banks
- Songwriters: Israel Heller; Jillian Rose Banks; Jasmin Mary Tadjiky; Eliot Peter Phillip Dubock; Rachel Moulden
- Producers: Beat Butcha; Tālā; Banks

Banks singles chronology
"Skinnydipped" (2021)	"Holding Back" (2022)	"I Still Love You" (2022)

Lyric video
- "Holding Back" on YouTube

"Holding Back" is a song by American singer-songwriter Banks, released on February 25, 2022 as the third single from her fourth studio album, Serpentina (2022).

== Background and promotion ==
After releaseing two previous singles, "The Devil" and "Skinnydipped", Banks debuted "Holding Back" on February 24, 2022, in Jimmy Kimmel Live!. Alongside the single's release, she announced her then-upcoming fourth album, Serpentina.

According to Banks, "Holding Back" carries an "energy that is so big it could take up the whole room". She stated that amid the negativity of the COVID-19 pandemic, she wanted to uplift listeners through her music, offering a contrast to the darker material on her earlier albums Goddess (2014) and The Altar (2016). She added that the song "makes me feel ready to conquer the world". The Line of Best Fit's Hannah Broughton described "Holding Back" as "rapturous", noting that the song showcases new vocal approaches from Banks including "Nao-like pitched-up vocals".

== Composition ==
Skyy Rincon of MXDWN described "Holding Back" as "euphoric", highlighting its "mellifluous harmonization". She stated that the song "starts off on an intense note", and noted its "dreamy atmosphere" as it develops with layered vocalizations and melodies. Rincon concluded that the track results in a "decadent, heavenly listener experience".

== Personnel ==
Credits were adapted from Tidal.

- Banks – lead vocal, songwriter, producer
- Eliot Peter Phillip Dubock – songwriter, producer
- Israel Heller – songwriter
- Jasmin Mary Tadjiky – songwriter
- Rachel Emily Moulden – songwriter
- Tālā – producer

== Release history ==
List of release dates and formats
Region	Date	Format(s)	Label	Ref.
Various	June 16, 2022	Digital download; streaming	AWAL; Her Name Is Banks	
