= Serpentina (album) =

2022 studio album by Banks

- Standard cover (Note: A limited edition of Serpentina features Banks with vertical pupils.)

Studio album by Banks
- Released: April 8, 2022
- Studio: The Fortress of Amplitude; Larrabee Sound; Wedidit
- Genre: Alternative pop; experimental R&B
- Length: 41:26
- Label: AWAL; Her Name Is Banks
- Producer: Jillian Banks; Beat Butcha; Ben Darwish; Gitty; Alex Gruz; Orlando Higginbottom; Jeff Kleinman; Lido; Shlohmo; Al Shux; Stikmatik; Tālā

Banks chronology
III (2019)	Serpentina (2022)	Off with Her Head (2025)

Singles from Serpentina
- 1. "The Devil" Released: June 16, 2021; 2. "Skinnydipped" Released: August 25, 2021; 3. "Holding Back" Released: February 25, 2022; 4. "I Still Love You" Released: March 21, 2022; 5. "Meteorite" Released: April 4, 2022; 6. "Deadend" Released: April 6, 2022

Serpentina is the fourth studio album by American singer and songwriter Banks, released on April 8, 2022, through AWAL and Her Name Is Banks Inc. Developed largely during the COVID-19 pandemic, it was written and recorded while Banks was living in isolation, a period she later described as both emotionally difficult and creatively transformative. She recorded the album at Fortress of Amplitude, Larrabee Sound, and Wedidit Studios, and used the time to focus on songwriting, co-producing, and learning music production.

For Serpentina, Banks worked with a smaller, hand-selected group of collaborators—primarily Shlohmo and Tālā—departing from her previous practice of collaborating with a wide range of producers. She also chose not to seek feedback or approval from management during its development, and the release marked Banks's first project as an independent artist. An alt-pop album with experimental R&B elements, Serpentina blends elements of R&B and electro-hip-hop, which pairs Banks's restrained vocals with dramatic, bass-driven production and drawing on themes of sensuality, rebirth, independence, and emotional release. It also spawned six singles, including the lead single "The Devil", followed by "Skinnydipped", "Holding Back", "I Still Love You", "Meteorite", and "Deadend". Banks embarked the Serpentina Tour in mid-2022, in support of the album.

Serpentina received generally favorable reviews from music critics, holding a score of 70 on Metacritic. Reviewers highlighted its dramatic production, pop accessibility, and themes of reinvention, though some criticism was directed at its stylistic cohesion. Commercially, the album charted on multiple UK charts and reached the top 100 of Billboard's Top Current Album Sales chart in the United States.

== Background and recording ==
Much of Serpentina was developed during the COVID-19 pandemic, during which Banks lived alone and spent long stretches "in [her] head". She recorded the album in the Fortress of Amplitude, Larrabee Sound and Wedidit Studios. Banks stated that the experience was "a really hard time", but she channelled much of that time into writing music and learning production. She worked primarily with a hand-selected group that included Shlohmo and Tālā, while she had previously worked with a wide range of producers and collaborators. The singer later described the process as "a blessing to choose people who make you feel good", noting that the environment allowed her to feel uplifted, inspired, and pushed "creatively". Unlike her usual practice, she also did not seek feedback or approval from management while developing the album. Instead, she characterized the period as "This is what it's gonna be." The album was Banks's first with independent label AWAL, with which she negotiated a deal to retain ownership of her master recordings.

== Development and theme ==
On the creation of Serpentina, Banks recalled moments of late nights spent dancing to newly finished tracks with close collaborators as well as solitary hikes that became part of her writing process. She stated that she worked through personal struggles and gradually "fell in love with [herself] again", describing this process as one that helped her "turn a page" and "open up to lightness". In an interview with The Fader, Banks explained that Serpentina emerged from a period in which she consciously prioritized independence and her own intuition, describing a desire to work without seeking outside opinions and to "dive in on [her] own". She said that the approach was "happening naturally" and that she chose to "really dive in on my own" rather than involve others during the early stages of the album's development. She also cited her growing familiarity with Ableton and a more hands-on approach to production. Although she had previously overseen her work in an executive capacity, Banks described Serpentina as her first experience engineering and shaping sounds largely on her own, which deepened her connection to music while distancing her from the business aspects of her career.

About the album's lead single, "The Devil", Banks discussed its conceptual origins. She explained that it began as a "playful" idea she developed on her own. She described the writing process as "fun", and emphasized that the song came together organically, with the bass line carrying the track, before additional collaborators were later brought in to help finish it.

== Composition ==
Like Banks's earlier works, Serpentina combines her restrained vocals with electro-hip-hop production that moves fluidly between jittery rhythms and smoother textures. According to Banks, she had wanted "a mix of feeling 'creature-y' and animalistic" while "sensual and feminine". Emma Madden from The Daily Telegraph observed that the album contains "overly liberal and catholic approach to genre", such as gospel, trap beats, goth pop and ballads. Cora Jordan of Clash noted that the album is "multi-layered and filled with enigma", and its arrangements move fluidly between powerful bass-driven choruses and more restrained, piano-led passages, while she continues to "float and slither across sounds" to create pop balladry with an "alternative vibe". The Line of Best Fit author Hannah Broughton described the record as her "most purely pop" release to date, built around heart-felt love songs and club-oriented tracks. In Slant Magazine, Thomas Bedenbaugh characterized Serpentina as a "dark meditation on heartbreak and loss" and identified Banks's voice as the one "consistent singular element" that distinguishes it.

An alt-pop album, Serpentina features an experimental R&B production, with Banks abandoning restraint in favor of a more unfiltered and expressive approach. Madden saw that the album "simply sounds like a compendium of vaguely off-kilter avant-pop and R&B trends". As noted by NME's Hannah Mylrea, its title presents a process of "reinvention", which draws on the imagery of a "snake shedding their skin", a concept that aligns with her decision to "switch things up". In line with this shift, Banks assumed "full control of the production", and it fused her "trademark sound" with new genre influences. As a result, work on Serpentina helped Banks through this period, and the resulting sense of strength permeates the album. Beats per Minute's JT Early observed that Serpentina centers on "pain and rebirth", and its lyrics are "as pointed as an ice-pick", while it balances emotional intensity with moments of "warmth and self-confidence" reminiscent of her earlier releases, The Altar and III. This "emotional spectrum" is mirrored in the music itself, as the album underscores Banks's "multi-faceted" approach to composition.

=== Songs ===
"The Devil"
"The Devil" features a "haunted production" recalling fellow Angelino Billie Eilish. Built around a "dark and deep" elements, the track blends "malevolent nature", with Banks opening the song in "a whispery tone".

Serpentina opens with songs that were noted for their pulse-driven production, including "Meteorite", "Fuck Love", and "Holding Back". "Meteorite" stands out for its use of handclaps and vocal samples, while "Fuck Love" leans into digitized aggression and "Holding Back" is built around a swirling bass sounds as well as anguished and frenetic sound. The opening track, "Misunderstood", runs for under two minutes and functions as a brief manifesto, with Banks portrayed as something of an outcast. The album's tone shifts with "The Devil", the "haunted production" of which has been compared to Billie Eilish by Madden and AllMusic's Neil Z. Yeung. Jordan noted her vocals for sounding "clear, pristine, and uninterrupted", while her lyricisms are "powerful".

The latter half of Serpentina is characterized by Yeung as a balance of "introspection and measured hope", particularly on the gospel-inflected "Spirit" featuring Samoht. According to Yeung, this closing stretch evokes a "collision" between the more restrained material of Tove Lo and Rihanna. "Skinnydipped" features production that what Kevin Leblanc of Elle described as "slides below her piercing delivery", with lines such as "I aired out my sheets 'cause they smell like you / I cleaned out the salt in my wounds". The song is about "finally letting go of something that you've gone back to many times before", according to Banks. In "Burn", she presents a more open and vulnerable performance that guides listeners through a range of emotions. Meanwhile, a love song "Birds by the Sea" features Banks singing in a higher register with a sense of despair, featuring lyrics such as "heard you live with a girl by the sea [...] I thought of you with the birds, but you never sang for me". "I Still Love You" closes with a soft laugh, a detail that was noted for adding a more human dimension to her persona.

== Marketing ==
Six singles were released from Serpentina. "The Devil", the album's lead single, was released on July 25, 2021, along with its music video co-directed with Jenna Marsh. Marking her first release as an independent artist, the music video draws visual inspiration from the surreal and ornate aesthetics of Francis Ford Coppola's 1992 film Dracula and the stylized body-horror elements of Robert Zemeckis's Death Becomes Her. "Skinnydipped" followed on August 25, with Michael Stine-co-directed music video; the lyric video was unveiled on September 7.

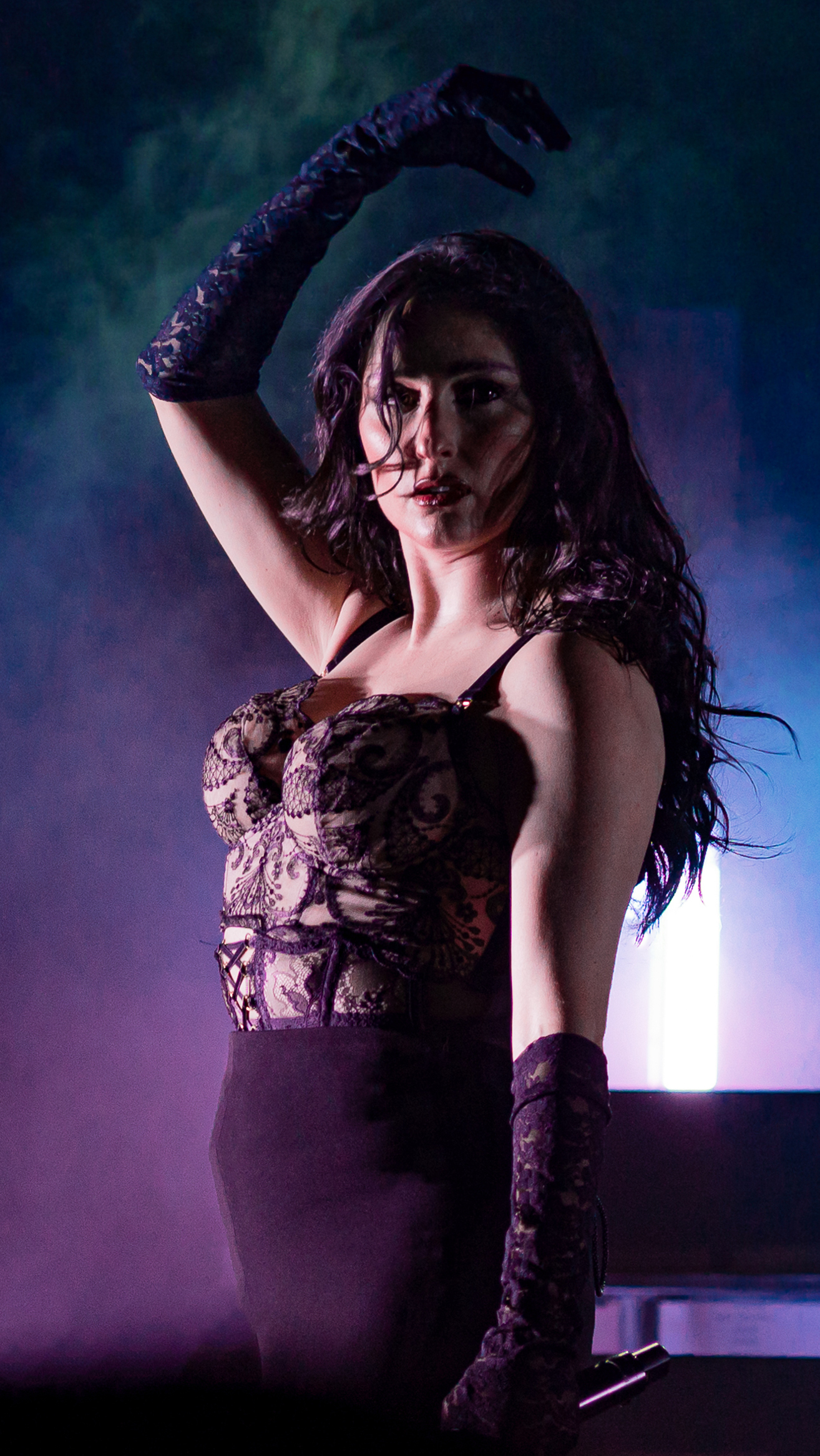
Banks in 2022

Banks debuted "Holding Back" on Jimmy Kimmel Live! on February 24, 2022; the song was released on the next day as the album's third single. Its release came with the announcement of Serpentina, as well as its pre-order and tracklist on the same day. With the release of "I Still Love You", she announced standalone performance dates in May, set to open up on May 25 in San Diego, Santa Ana on May 27, and Napa Valley on May 28. Banks teased the track three days before of its release (March 21), with a 17-second snippet. An accompanying music video, co-directed by Banks and James Mountford, was released along with the single. Two remaining singles were "Meteorite" (April 4) and "Deadend" (April 6). Banks later announced that she would embark on the Serpentina Tour, with a set opening date in Austin, Texas on July 11 featuring Lauren Jauregui as a special guest.

== Critical reception ==
Professional ratings
Aggregate scores
Source	Rating
Metacritic	70/100
Review scores
Source	Rating
AllMusic	3.5/5 stars
Beats per Minute	75%
Clash	8/10
The Daily Telegraph	2/5 stars
Dork	4/5
Gigwise	7/10 stars
The Line of Best Fit	6/10
MusicOMH	3/5 stars
NME	4/5 stars
Slant Magazine	3/5 stars

Serpentina received generally favourable reviews from music critics. At Metacritic, which assigns a normalised rating out of 100 to reviews from mainstream critics, the album has an average score of 70 based on eight reviews.

Writing for AllMusic, Neil Z. Yeung felt that the album added "fresh highlights" to her catalogue, even as it remained close to her established sound. Clash contributor Cora Jordan described Banks as having cultivated an "individual and authentic sound", viewing Serpentina as a record that reflects her creativity and passion while presenting her as a "new and transformed performer". Stephen Ackroyd of Dork similarly framed the album as a reinvention, likening it to "a fresh new start" akin to a snake shedding its skin. Ben Devlin, writing for MusicOMH, praised the album at its strongest moments as "genuinely explosive" and cited tracks such as "Holding Back" for their forceful production. He also noted Banks's continued effort to balance emotional intensity with musical control. Hannah Broughton of The Line of Best Fit viewed Serpentina as a largely pop-oriented release; the author described it as potentially Banks's "most purely pop" album to date, albeit one that "has its moments" rather than achieving full cohesion. Writing for NME, Hannah Mylrea highlighted the album's "dramatic" production, noting its use of "trappy beats" paired with "bleeping synths" on tracks such as "Fuck Love", as well as chanted vocals that gradually build over handclaps on "Meteorite". She ultimately described Serpentina as "a welcome reintroduction" to Banks and "a cathartic ode to doing things your own way".

In The Daily Telegraph, Emma Madden was more critical, arguing that Banks at times sounded "antagonistic towards her listener". She criticized the album for relying on "boilerplate" musical ideas and "platitudinous" lyrics, and described Serpentina as a congested and ill-considered mixture of styles—ranging from gospel to trap and goth pop—that failed to give its individual concepts sufficient room to develop.

== Track listing ==
Standard edition
No.	Title	Writer(s)	Producer(s)	Length
1.	"Misunderstood"	Jillian Banks; Rachel Moulden; Jasmin Tadjiky; Peder Losnegard	Banks; Lido; Tālā	1:41
2.	"Meteorite"	Banks; Orlando Higginbottom; Tadjiky; Henry Laufer	Banks; Higginbottom; Tālā; Shlohmo	4:17
3.	"Fuck Love"	Banks; Tadjiky; Bansi Sohodeb	Banks; Shlohmo; Tālā; StikMatik	2:49
4.	"Deadend"	Banks; Ben Darwish; Laufer	Banks; Darwish; Shlohmo	3:55
5.	"Holding Back"	Banks; Moulden; Tadjiky; Eliot Peter Phillip Dubock; Israel Heller	Tālā; Beat Butcha	3:52
6.	"The Devil"	Banks; Al Shux; Jeff Gitelman	Banks; Al Shux; Gitty	2:47
7.	"Skinnydipped"	Banks; Darwish; Laufer	Banks; Shlohmo	2:55
8.	"Burn"	Banks; Alex Gruz; Tadjiky; Laufer	Banks; Shlohmo; Tālā; Gruz	3:25
9.	"Birds by the Sea"	Banks; Darwish	Banks; Darwish	3:00
10.	"Spirit" (featuring Samoht)	Banks; Moulden; Tadjiky; Dubock; Thomas Parker	Tālā; Beat Butcha	2:29
11.	"Anything 4 U"	Banks; Tadjiky	Banks; Shlohmo; Tālā	3:06
12.	"Unleavable"	Banks; Jeff Kleinman; Laufer; Losnegard	Banks; Kleinman; Lido; Shlohmo	4:15
13.	"I Still Love You"	Banks; Laufer; Higginbottom	Banks; Shlohmo; Higginbottom	2:55
Total length:				41:26

== Credits and personnel ==
Credits were adapted from the liner notes and Tidal.

=== Recording locations ===
- The Fortress of Amplitude
- Larrabee Sound Studios
- Wedidit

=== Personnel ===
- Banks – lead vocals, producer, songwriter
- Lido – producer, songwriter
- Tālā – producer, songwriter
- Shlohmo – producer, songwriter
- Beat Butcha – producer, songwriter
- Al Shux – producer, songwriter
- Jeff "Gitty" Gitelman – producer, songwriter
- Ben Darwish – producer, songwriter
- Orlando Higginbottom – producer, songwriter
- Alex Gruz – producer, songwriter
- Jeff Kleinman – producer, songwriter
- StikMatik – producer, songwriter
- Jasmin Mary Tadjiky – songwriter
- Rachel Emily Moulden – songwriter
- Peder Losnegård – songwriter
- Eliot Peter Phillip Dubock – songwriter
- Israel Heller – songwriter
- Alexander Shuckburgh – songwriter
- Parker Thomas – songwriter
- Samoht – featured artist (10)

== Charts ==
Chart (2022)	Peak position
UK Album Downloads (OCC)	39
UK Independent Albums (OCC)	26
UK Physical Albums (OCC)	91
UK Vinyl Albums (OCC)	31
US Top Current Album Sales (Billboard)	80

== Release history ==
List of release dates and formats
Region	Date	Format	Label	Ref.
Various	April 8, 2022	Digital download; LP; streaming	AWAL; Her Name Is Banks	
