= Look What You're Doing to Me =

2019 song by Banks featuring Francis and the Lights

Single by Banks featuring Francis and the Lights

from the album III
- Released: June 11, 2019
- Studio: Conway and Henson, Los Angeles, California
- Genre: Indie pop; electronic-R&B
- Length: 4:00
- Label: Harvest
- Songwriters: Jillian Banks; Brandon Burton; Francis Farewell Starlite; Brandon Treyshun Campbell
- Producers: BJ Burton; Francis Farewell Starlite

Banks singles chronology
"Gimme" (2019)	"Look What You're Doing to Me" (2019)	"Contaminated" (2019)

Francis and the Lights singles chronology
"The Video in the Pool" (2018)	"Look What You're Doing to Me" (2019)	"Do U Need Love?" (2019)

Lyric video
- "Look What You're Doing to Me" on YouTube

"Look What You're Doing to Me" is a song by American singer and songwriter Banks from her third studio album, III (2019). It was released as the album's second single on June 11, 2019, and features American pop project Francis and the Lights. It premiered as Annie Mac's "Hottest Record" on the same date. Banks and Brandon Treyshun Campbell co-wrote the song with its producers, BJ Burton and Francis Farewell Starlite.

== Background ==
About "Look What You're Doing to Me", Banks stated that "the song is about love. About falling in love, being in love and how you feel when you’re high on love. Vibrant, scared, on fire, excited, and all the goodness in between".

== Music video ==
Banks posted a lyric video for the song on her YouTube channel on June 11, 2019.

== Credits and personnel ==
Credits adapted from the liner notes of III.

=== Recording and management ===
- Engineered at Conway Recording Studios and Henson Recording Studios, Los Angeles, California
- Mixed at Conway Recording Studios, Los Angeles, California, and Electric Lady Studios, New York City, New York
- Mastered at HM Mastering, Minneapolis, Minnesota
- Published by Chilleth Banks Publishing, administered by Songs of Kobalt Music Publishing (BMI) and brought to you by Heavy Duty (ASCAP) / Heavy Duty Music Publishing, Good Years / BMG Music UK (ASCAP) and Golden Touch MGMT Music (ASCAP) / Prescription Songs (ASCAP)

=== Personnel ===
- Banks – vocals
- BJ Burton – production, engineering, keyboards, synthesizers, drums, programming
- Francis Farewell Starlite – production, vocals, piano, table drums
- Tom Elmhirst – mixing
- Brandon Bost – engineering for mix
- Huntley Miller – mastering

== Release history ==
Releasw dates and formats for "Look What You're Doing to Me"
Region	Date	Format	Label	Ref.
Various	June 11, 2019	Digital download; streaming	Harvest	
