= I Finally Understand =

2020 single by Charli XCX

- Designed by POLYGON

Single by Charli XCX

from the album How I'm Feeling Now
- Released: 7 May 2020
- Recorded: April 15th, 2020
- Genre: Electropop; Eurodance; pop
- Length: 2:31
- Label: Atlantic; Asylum
- Songwriters: Charlotte Aitchison; Benjamin Keating; Alexander Guy Cook
- Producer: Palmistry

Charli XCX singles chronology
"Claws" (2020)	"I Finally Understand" (2020)	"Charger (Charli XCX Rework)" (2021)

Audio video
- "I Finally Understand" on YouTube

"I Finally Understand" (stylized in lowercase) is a song by British singer Charli XCX. It was released on 7 May 2020 as the third single from her fourth studio album, How I'm Feeling Now (2020). As with all previous singles from the album, three official covers were released for the song. The song was first announced on Charli XCX's Twitter on 2 May 2020.

== Composition ==
"I Finally Understand" is a UK garage and Baltimore club-influenced electropop and Eurodance song described as an "ode to her boyfriend". The song has been described as "groove-driven" and having "a more straightforward pop format than 'forever' or 'claws' but with a no less diverse sonic palette." In the lyrics, she also delves into her struggles with mental health with the line "My therapist said I hate myself really bad."

== Critical reception ==
Callie Ahlgrim and Courteney Larocca both contributed to an article for Business Insider. Ahlgrim wrote that the song was "super catchy, cleaner and more minimalistic than much of the album, and very strong lyrically", while Larcocca found that the track's "steady beat throughout [reminded her] of Grimes' 'Oblivion'", in addition to "[loving] how completely overdramatic Charli is about finding a love so strong". Anna Gaca from Pitchfork felt that the song was "devoted to sincere, immediate romance and pleasure". Stereogum listed the song as the 5th best song of the week of 8 May 2020, praising the song for not being "a love song in the stereotypical, classic sense", while finding some lyrics "sexual as all hell", saw "raw vulnerability at work", concluding that the track was at "some level, a dance-pop song, and dance-pop songs almost never get as real as that". Josiah Hughes from Exclaim! called the track an "excellent tune from her endless catalogue of hits" as "Charli XCX's seemingly unstoppable pop reign continues". Josiah Skallerup, writing for Riff Magazine, called the song "one of the most poignant shelter-in-place tunes, built out of a drum-and-bass loop", as the "song chronicles a myriad of feelings that are likely coming up for many of us—insecurity, depression and anxiety—as well as the potential we all have to break through those feelings to heal by tapping into some personal reflection and growth" during quarantine.

== Personnel ==
Credits adapted from Tidal.

- Charli XCX - lead and backing vocals, songwriting, recording
- Benjamin Keating - production, vocal production, songwriting, backing vocals, synthesizer, bass, drums
- A. G. Cook - additional production, vocal production, drum programming, synthesizer, bass, drums
- Stuart Hawkes - mastering
- Geoff Swan - mixing
