= Ones and Sixes =

Studio album by Low
- Released: September 11, 2015
- Studio: April Base Studios (Eau Claire, Wisconsin)
- Genre: Slowcore, noise
- Length: 57:02
- Label: Sub Pop
- Producer: BJ Burton; Low

Low chronology
The Invisible Way (2013)	Ones and Sixes (2015)	Double Negative (2018)

Professional ratings
Aggregate scores
Source	Rating
AnyDecentMusic?	7.6/10
Metacritic	78/100
Review scores
Source	Rating
AllMusic	3/5 stars
The A.V. Club	B
The Guardian	4/5 stars
Mojo	4/5 stars
NME	7/10
The Observer	4/5 stars
Pitchfork	7.8/10
Q	4/5 stars
Rolling Stone	3.5/5 stars
Spin	8/10

Ones and Sixes is the eleventh studio album by Low, released on September 11, 2015. It was co-produced by the band and engineer BJ Burton, at Justin Vernon's April Base Studios in Eau Claire, Wisconsin. Sub Pop released a promotional video for 'No Comprende' in advance of the album's release, on June 23, 2015. The album also features contributions from Wilco drummer Glenn Kotche. The album artwork was created by artist Peter Liversidge. The album's lyrics were nominated for an AML Award.

== Composition ==
Musically, a shift made itself evident to critics reviewing Ones and Sixes, reaping generally positive assessments. While its predecessor The Invisible Way saw Jeff Tweedy of Wilco handling the production duties, Ones and Sixes would feature Bon Iver associate B.J. Burton producing alongside Low for the first time. He went on to produce their albums Double Negative and Hey What.

The change in technical personnel would result in the trio's sound being "pushed, pulled and wrangled out of shape to devastating effect," "striking a balance between their majestic, slow-moving melancholy and harsher experimental noise."

== Track listing ==
All tracks are written by Low

No.	Title	Length
1.	"Gentle"	5:06
2.	"No Comprende"	4:59
3.	"Spanish Translation"	4:17
4.	"Congregation"	3:51
5.	"No End"	2:49
6.	"Into You"	3:57
7.	"What Part of Me"	3:08
8.	"The Innocents"	4:22
9.	"Kid in the Corner"	4:32
10.	"Lies"	4:15
11.	"Landslide"	9:50
12.	"DJ"	5:56

== Charts ==
Chart (2015)	Peak position
Belgian Albums (Ultratop Flanders)	60
Belgian Albums (Ultratop Wallonia)	65
Dutch Albums (Album Top 100)	34
French Albums (SNEP)	115
Irish Albums (IRMA)	45
UK Albums (OCC)	35
US Billboard 200	158
