= BJ Burton =

American record producer

- Born: Brandon Joyner Burton; Raleigh, North Carolina, U.S.
- Occupations: Record producer; songwriter; musician; engineer; mixer

BJ Burton is an American record producer, songwriter, engineer, and mixer. He is known for his work with Bon Iver, Francis and the Lights, Low, Charli XCX, the Japanese House, Eminem, Lizzo, Cara Delevigne and Mike Will Made It, among others.

Burton has been nominated for four Grammy Awards for his work with Bon Iver on their respective 22, A Million and i,i albums, Sylvan Esso on their album What Now, and Low on their album Hey What.

== Career ==
From 2010 to 2013, Burton performed and served production duties as a member of the Love Language; he produced their albums Libraries and Ruby Red.

Burton has worked extensively with Justin Vernon and Bon Iver. His collaborations with Vernon and Francis and the Lights have led to work with artists including Chance the Rapper, Eminem, Kanye West, Mike Will Made It, and more. Burton has also performed as a member of Bon Iver, on the Come Through tour in 2018.

== Songwriting and production discography ==
Year	Artist	Album / song(s)	Role(s)	Label
2011	The Rosebuds	Loud Planes Fly Low	Production, recording, mixing	Merge
2013	Lizzo	Lizzobangers – "Lizzie Borden", "W.E.R.K. Pt. II", "Wat U Mean"	Mixing	Totally Gross National Product
2013	POLIÇA	Shulamith	Engineering	Mom + Pop
2014	Sylvan Esso	Sylvan Esso	Mixing, mastering	Partisan
2015	The Staves	If I Was	Mixing	Atlantic
2015	The Tallest Man on Earth	Dark Bird Is Home	Production, mixing, engineering	Dead Oceans
2015	Low	Ones and Sixes	Production, recording, mixing, mastering	Sub Pop
2015	Doe Paoro	After	Production, mixing	ANTI-
2015	Lizzo	Big Grrrl Small World – "Ain't I", "Betcha", "Ride", "Humanize", "Bother Me", "1 Deep", "The Realest"	Production, executive production, vocals, vocoder, guitar, synthesizers, drum programming	Self-released
2016	Allan Kingdom	Northern Lights – "I Feel Ya"	Mixing	So Cold
2016	Astronautalis	SIKE! – "You Know What It Is!"	Production, synthesizers, mixing	SideOneDummy
2016	Bon Iver	22, A Million – "10 d E A T h b R E a s T ⚄ ⚄", "29 #Strafford APTS", "666 ʇ", "8 (circle)"	Writing, production, C1 programming, C2 programming, saxophone, programming	Jagjaguwar
2016	James Blake	The Colour In Anything – "Meet You In The Maze"	Engineering	Polydor
2016	P.O.S.	"Wave"	Production	Doomtree
2016	P.O.S.	"Woof"	Production	Doomtree
2016	Francis and the Lights	Farewell, Starlite!	Writing, production, mixing	Self-released
2017	Hippo Campus	Landmark	Production, mixing	Grand Jury, Transgressive
2017	Mike Will Made It	Ransom 2 – "Burnin", "Y'all Ain't Ready", "Faith"	Mixing	Ear Drummer, Interscope
2017	Sylvan Esso	What Now	Mixing	Loma Vista
2017	Har Mar Superstar	Personal Boy EP	Writing, production,	Love OnLine
2017	Francis and the Lights	Just For Us	Writing, production, mixing	Self-released
2018	Mike Will Made It & Bon Iver	Creed II: The Album – "Do You Need Power? (Walk Out Music)"	Writing	Ear Drummer, Interscope
2018	Hippo Campus	Bambi	Production, mixing, engineering	Grand Jury, Transgressive
2018	Francis and the Lights	"The Video In the Pool"	Production	Self-released
2018	Eminem	Kamikaze – "Fall"	Writing	Shady, Aftermath, Interscope
2018	Low	Double Negative	Production, recording, mixing, mastering	Sub Pop
2018	Twin Shadow	Caer – "Saturdays", "18 Years", "Too Many Colors", "Bombs Away"	Production, mixing	Warner Music, Reprise
2018	Mallrat	In the Sky – "Make Time"	Writing, production, engineer	Dew Process
2018	Heart Bones	"Disapearer"	Writing, production	Love OnLine
2019	Baby Boys	I'm Set	Production, mastering	Grand Jury
2019	The Japanese House	Good at Falling	Writing, production	Dirty Hit
2019	Banks	III – "Till Now", "Gimme", "Contaminated", "Stroke", "Godless", "Look What You're Doing To Me", "Hawaiian Mazes", "Propaganda", "The Fall", "If We Were Made Of Water"	Writing, production, executive production, synthesizers, drums, programming, drum programming, arrangement, guitar, piano, bass, engineering	Harvest
2019	Chance the Rapper	The Big Day – "Town on the Hill"	Writing	Self-released
2019	Francis and the Lights	"Take Me To The Light"	Writing, production	Self-released
2019	Miley Cyrus	She Is Coming – "The Most"	Writing, production, programming	RCA
2019	Yebba	"Where Do You Go"	Production	Self-released
2019	Bon Iver	i,i – "Yi", "iMi", "We", "Hey, Ma", "Naeem", "Jelmore", "Faith", "Sh'Diah"	Writing, production, programming, arrangement, TR 8's, engineering, mixing	Jagjaguwar
2019	Joy Again	Piano – "I'm Your Dog"	Production, mixing	Honeymoon
2020	Empress Of	I'm Your Empress Of	Production, executive production, engineering, mixing	Terrible
2020	Bon Iver	"PDLIF"	Writing, production, mixing	Jagjaguwar
2020	Charli XCX	how i'm feeling now – "pink diamond", "forever", "claws", "7 years", "detonate", "enemy", "anthems", "visions"	Writing, production, executive production, drum programming, synthesizers, Moog, bass, drums engineering	Atlantic, Asylum
2020	Kacy Hill	Is It Selfish If We Talk About Me Again – "To Someone Else", "Much Higher", "Just To Say", "Porsche", "I Believe In You", "Everybody's Mother", "Told Me", "Six"	Writing, production, mixing, mastering	Self-released
2020	Bon Iver	"AUATC"	Writing, production, strings	Jagjaguwar
2020	The Japanese House	Chewing Cotton Wool EP	Production	Dirty Hit
2020	Jim-E Stack	Ephemera – "Jeanie"	Writing, production	Self-released
2020	Westside Gunn	Who Made The Sunshine	Recording	Griselda, Shady
2020	Buddy Ross	"Bored Again!"	Writing	PLZ Make It Ruins
2020	Lupin	Lupin	Production, drum programming	Transgressive
2020	Taylor Swift	Evermore – "closure"	Additional production	Republic
2020	Aero Flynn	Madeline	Writing, production, performance	Self-released
2021	CARM	CARM	Mixing	37d03d
2021	Soccer Mommy	"rom com 2004"	Production	Loma Vista
2021	Kacey Musgraves	Star-Crossed – "Justified", "Breadwinner"	Writing	MCA Nashville, Interscope
2021	Low	Hey What	Production, recording, mixing, mastering	Sub Pop
2021	Jon Bellion	"I Feel It"	Writing, production	Capitol
2021	Kacy Hill	Simple, Sweet, and Smiling – "The Stars"	Writing	Self-released
2021	No Rome	It's All Smiles	Production	Dirty Hit
2022	Alicia Keys	Keys – "Come for Me"	Writing, production	RCA
2022	Empress Of	Save Me EP – "Save Me", "Dance for You"	Writing, production	Self-released
2023	Miley Cyrus	Endless Summer Vacation – "Island"	Writing, production	Columbia Records
2023	Empress Of	For Your Consideration (Empress Of album) - "Kiss Me"	Writing	Giant Music
2023	Ilsey	From the Valley	Writing, production	Elektra Records
2024	Ani DiFranco	Unprecedented Sh!t	Production	Righteous Babe Records
2024	Father John Misty	Mahashmashana - "Josh Tillman and the Accidental Dose", "Screamland"	Additional production, mixing	Sub Pop
2025	Nine Inch Nails	Tron: Ares OST - "As Alive As You Need Me To Be", "I Know You Can Feel It", "Who Wants To Live Forever?", "Shadow Over Me"	Additional production, programming	Interscope Records, Walt Disney Records, The Null Corporation
2026	Cara Delevigne	Not Normal	Production Engineer Mixer	Warner Records
