= The Love Language =

American indie rock band

- Origin: Raleigh, North Carolina
- Genres: Indie, lo-fi, pop
- Years active: 2008–present
- Labels: Bladen County, Merge
- Members: Stuart McLamb; Thomas Simpson; Autumn Ehinger; Eddie Sanchez; Jordan McLamb; Kris Hilbert
- Past members: Christopher Hutcherson-Riddle; Josh Pope; Kate Thompson; Missy Thangs; Jeff Chapple; BJ Burton; Justin Rodermond; Nick Sanborn; Andy Holmes; Ryan Gustafson; Justin Williams; Ian Lockey; Carter Gaj; Jodi Burns; Skylar Gudasz; Josh Moore; Megan Glassman; Paul Thornley; Andrew Lessman; Mark Connor
- Website: www.thelovelanguage.com

The Love Language is an American indie rock band from Raleigh, North Carolina, headed by Stuart McLamb.

== Origin ==
The Love Language began after frontman Stuart McLamb's first band, The Capulets, broke up. Following a breakup with his girlfriend, McLamb went on a drinking binge and then retreated to his parents' house, where he began recording a series of demos. These songs were originally intended to be heard only by McLamb's ex-girlfriend and a handful of friends, but the demos expanded into a full recording project.

== Music ==
McLamb's first album, The Love Language, was released under Bladen County Records. Recorded entirely by McLamb, the album caught the attention of fellow North Carolina rockers, The Rosebuds, who asked The Love Language to open for them. To play live, McLamb formed a band with Kate Thompson (keyboard), Jeff Chapple (guitar), Josh Pope (bass), Tom Simpson (drums), and his brother Jordan McLamb (drums, acoustic guitar).

The Love Language was then signed to Durham-based Merge Records and released their second album Libraries in July 2010. Unlike the first album, Libraries was recorded in a traditional studio with help from producer BJ Burton.

Burton was also recruited to play guitar while touring along with Missy, Jordan, Kevin, and Justin Rodermond (bass).

== Discography ==
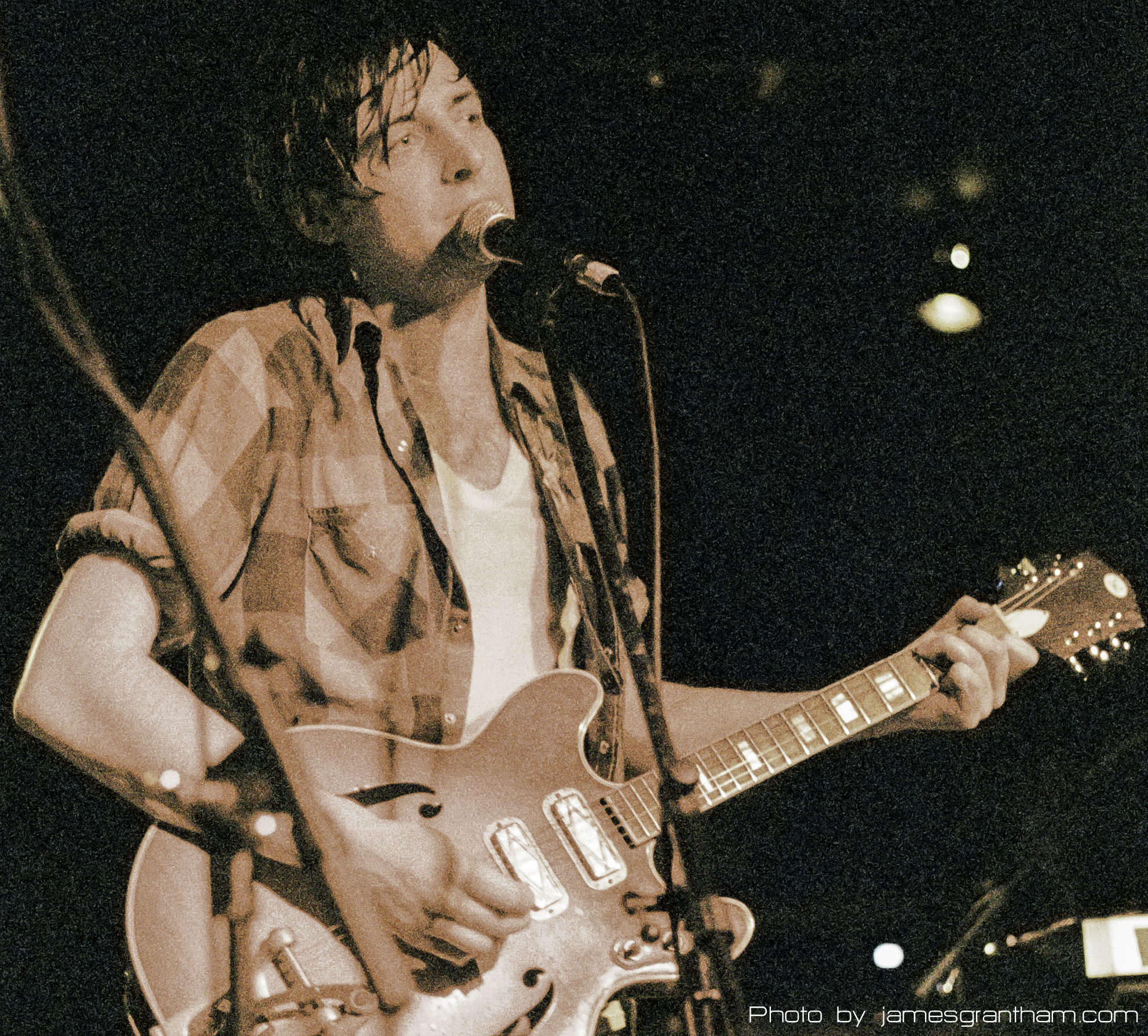
Stuart McLamb at The Soapbox, Wilmington, NC 2012

Year	Album details	Peak chart positions
Year	Album details	US Heat
2009	The Love Language: Release date: February 10, 2009; Label: Bladen County Records	—
2010	Libraries: Release date: September 11, 2010; Label: Merge Records	14
2013	Ruby Red: Release date: July 23, 2013; Label: Merge Records	—
2018	Baby Grand: Release date: August 3, 2018; Label: Merge Records	
