= Double Negative (album) =

Studio album by Low
- Released: September 14, 2018
- Studios: April Base, Fall Creek; The Terrarium, Minneapolis
- Genres: Ambient; noise; electronic; experimental; post-rock; slowcore
- Length: 48:50
- Label: Sub Pop
- Producer: BJ Burton

Low chronology
Ones and Sixes (2015)	Double Negative (2018)	Hey What (2021)

Singles from Double Negative
- 1. "Quorum" Released: June 12, 2018; 2. "Dancing and Blood" Released: June 12, 2018; 3. "Fly" Released: June 12, 2018; 4. "Disarray" Released: August 16, 2018

Double Negative is the twelfth studio album by Low, released by Sub Pop on September 14, 2018. It is the band's final album to feature bass guitarist Steve Garrington, and their second to be produced by BJ Burton after Ones and Sixes (2015).

== Critical reception ==
Professional ratings
Aggregate scores
Source	Rating
AnyDecentMusic?	8.1/10
Metacritic	86/100
Review scores
Source	Rating
AllMusic	4/5 stars
The A.V. Club	B−
Clash	9/10
The Guardian	5/5 stars
Mojo	3/5 stars
Pitchfork	8.7/10
PopMatters	9/10
Q	4/5 stars
Record Collector	5/5 stars
Uncut	9/10

On Metacritic, which assigns a normalized rating out of 100 to reviews from mainstream publications, Double Negative has an average score of 86 based on 21 reviews, indicating "universal acclaim". Writing in Pitchfork's list of the best albums of 2018, Marc Hogan said that "static prevails and flickering tones are almost untraceable to the instruments that made them," and that this sound "captured [2018's] pervasive dread like nothing else." Alexis Petridis, in The Guardian's summary of the best albums of 2018, wrote "[I]n a world of predictable political music it seems unprecedented. That's partly because you don't expect a band to make their masterpiece 25 years into their career [...]. But it's mostly because, for all the vague precursors you could throw its way - from My Bloody Valentine to Radiohead's Kid A - Double Negative didn't sound like anything else, in Low's back catalogue or beyond."

=== Accolades ===
Publication	Accolade	Rank
NPR	The 50 Best Albums of 2018	17
BrooklynVegan	Top 50 Albums of 2018	2
Uncut	Uncut's Best New Albums of 2018	1
Paste	The 50 Best Albums of 2018	9
Vulture	The 15 Best Albums of 2018	2
The Quietus	100 Best Albums of 2018	8
Stereogum	The 50 Best Albums of 2018	8
The Wire	Releases of the Year 1–50	10
Pitchfork	The 50 Best Albums of 2018	8
Pitchfork	The 200 Best Albums of the 2010s	96
Tiny Mix Tapes	Favorite 50 music releases	7
The Guardian	The 50 best albums of 2018	9

== Track listing ==
All tracks are written by Low.

No.	Title	Lead vocals	Length
1.	"Quorum"	Sparhawk; Parker	3:42
2.	"Dancing and Blood"	Parker	6:22
3.	"Fly"	Parker	5:48
4.	"Tempest"	Sparhawk	4:48
5.	"Always Up"	Sparhawk; Parker	5:28
6.	"Always Trying to Work It Out"	Sparhawk	3:55
7.	"The Son, The Sun"	Instrumental, spoken word by Parker	3:30
8.	"Dancing and Fire"	Sparhawk	4:17
9.	"Poor Sucker"	Sparhawk	3:35
10.	"Rome (Always in the Dark)"	Sparhawk; Parker	3:32
11.	"Disarray"	Sparhawk; Parker	3:52
Total length:			48:50

== Personnel ==
Low

- Steve Garrington – bass guitar
- Mimi Parker – vocals, percussion
- Alan Sparhawk – guitar, vocals

Additional musicians

- Maaika van der Linde – bass flute on "Always Up"

Technical

- Brett Bullion – assistant engineering
- BJ Burton – recording, mixing, mastering
- Zach Hanson – assistant engineering

Artwork

- David Kramer – editing assistance, design
- Peter Liversidge – artwork, photos

== Charts ==
Chart (2018)	Peak position
Australian Digital Albums (ARIA)	41
Belgian Albums (Ultratop Flanders)	31
Belgian Albums (Ultratop Wallonia)	109
Irish Albums (IRMA)	69
Italian Albums (FIMI)	90
Scottish Albums (Official Charts)	14
Spanish Albums (PROMUSICAE)	23
Swiss Albums (Schweizer Hitparade)	52
UK Albums (Official Charts)	26
