= Contaminated (song) =

Single by Banks

from the album III
- Released: July 10, 2019
- Studio: Precious (Minneapolis)
- Genre: Electropop
- Length: 4:40
- Label: Harvest
- Songwriters: Jillian Banks; Kevin Owen Garrett; Brandon Treyshun Campbell
- Producer: BJ Burton

Banks singles chronology
"Look What You're Doing To Me" (2019)	"Contaminated" (2019)	"The Devil" (2021)

Visualizer
- "Contaminated" on YouTube

"Contaminated" is a song by American singer and songwriter Banks from her third studio album, III (2019). Harvest Records released it on July 10, 2019, as the third single from the album. It was produced by BJ Burton and written by Banks, Kevin Owen Garrett, and Brandon Treyshun Campbell.

== Background ==
On July 9, 2019, Banks shared a sample of "Contaminated" and announced its release date on her Twitter account. It serves as the third single from III. A stripped-down, acoustic version of "Contaminated" appears on Banks' first live extended play Live and Stripped (2020). It was ultimately released on July 10, the next day, for digital download and streaming in various countries, through Harvest Records.

== Composition and lyrics ==
"Contaminated" was written by Banks, Brandon Treyshun Campbell and Kevin Garrett and produced by BJ Burton. Lyrically, the song is about adjusting to a unhealthy relationship. In the chorus, she sings: "And I wish I could change it / And we're always gonna be contaminated / I know what you need / You start letting me go, our love is tainted". Gabriel Aikins from Substream Magazine referred to the song's sound as a "haunting mix" of instruments and Burton's production. Rania Aniftos from Billboard said the song used a "heavy synth-based melody" alongside Banks' airy vocals.

== Reception and promotion ==
Mike Nied from Idolator called the single haunting and a bold choice for a single, following "Gimme" and "Look What You're Doing to Me".

An accompanying lyric video was released in support of the single on August 21, 2019 to Banks' Vevo channel on YouTube. "Contaminated" premiered on Zane Lowe's Beats 1 radio show. Banks performed the song at The Late Show with Stephen Colbert on September 9, 2019. Nina Corcoran from Consequence of Sound noted how Banks performed with "her trademark vibrato" which contrasted with the song's lyrical content.

== Credits and personnel ==
Credits adapted from the liner notes of III.

=== Recording ===
- Engineered at Precious (Minneapolis, Minnesota)
- Mixed at Conway Recording Studios (Los Angeles, California) and Electric Lady Studios (New York City, New York)
- Mastered at HM Mastering (Minneapolis, Minnesota)

=== Personnel ===
- Banks – vocals
- BJ Burton – production, engineering, vocal production, guitar, piano, synthesizers, drums, programming
- Aron Forbes – engineering, vocal production
- Sam Tusa – engineering assistance
- Mark Mcgee – programming
- Jake Hanson – guitar
- Ben Lester – pedal steel
- Trevor Hagen – trumpet
- Tom Elmhirst – mixing
- Brandon Bost – engineering for mix
- Huntley Miller – mastering

== Charts ==
Chart performance for "Contaminated"
Chart (2019)	Peak position
New Zealand Hot Singles (RMNZ)	30

== Release history ==
Release dates and formats for "Contaminated"
Region	Date	Format(s)	Label	Ref.
Various	July 10, 2019	Digital download; streaming	Harvest	
