= III (Banks album) =

2019 studio album by Banks

- Standard cover

Studio album by Banks
- Released: July 12, 2019
- Recorded: c. 2017–2019 (Note: According to Banks, she did not stop writing songs after the Altar Tour, which concluded in 2017; she said that she wrote the album for "two-and-a-half" years, in 2019.)
- Studios: Westlake (West Hollywood); The Healthfarm; Panther Palace (Burbank); Precious (Minneapolis); Conway; Henson (Los Angeles); The Church (London); Darling (Minneapolis)
- Genres: Electropop; R&B
- Length: 47:05
- Label: Harvest
- Producers: Tim Anderson; BJ Burton; Paul Epworth; Aron Forbes; Kito; Hudson Mohawke; Psymun; Buddy Ross; Sohn; Francis Farewell Starlite; Jesse Ward

Banks chronology
The Altar (2016)	III (2019)	Serpentina (2022)

Singles from III
- 1. "Gimme" Released: April 29, 2019; 2. "Look What You're Doing to Me" Released: June 11, 2019; 3. "Contaminated" Released: July 10, 2019

III is the third studio album by American singer and songwriter Banks. It was released on July 12, 2019, through Harvest Records. Following the release of her second album The Altar (2016) and its accompanying tour, the Altar Tour, Banks began writing material for III over a period of approximately two and a half years, primarily recording at Westlake Recording Studios in Los Angeles. During the process, she wrote around 50 songs before narrowing the track list to 13. The album was produced through collaborations with Buddy Ross, BJ Burton, and Hudson Mohawke.

Banks announced the album's title and release date in May 2019, followed by the release of its cover art and track listing. The album was supported by the singles "Gimme", "Look What You're Doing to Me", and "Contaminated", as well as promotional performances and media appearances. In support of the record, Banks embarked on her third headlining concert tour, the III Tour, across North America and Europe. Thematically, III focuses on self-love, emotional growth, and personal transition. The album addresses pain, intimacy, and transformation, while also engaging with cyclical ideas such as beginnings, endings, and rebirth. Musically, III has been described by critics as an electropop and R&B production with alternative R&B elements, characterized by heavy bass, spacious percussion, layered vocal processing, and frequent use of Auto-Tune.

Upon release, III received generally positive reviews from music critics. They described it as a pivotal point in Banks's career, praising its production choices, sonic textures, and sense of artistic progression, though some questioned its structural coherence and stylistic balance. Commercially, the album debuted at number 21 on the US Billboard 200 and reached number three on the Billboard Top Alternative Albums chart. It also peaked at number seven in Canada.

== Background and recording ==
In 2016, Banks released her second studio album, The Altar, which reached the top 20 in the Billboard 200 chart. She gained 513 million on-demand streams in the United States, and her music was featured on several television shows including Girls and Power. In 2017, she collaborated with American singer and songwriter 6lack on the song "In Between". After her second headlining tour, the Altar Tour, Banks wrote songs for III in Los Angeles's Westlake Recording Studios, although she was taking a break from the music. The album was recorded over a period of approximately two and a half years, including sessions at Henson Studios in Los Angeles. During this time, in 2018, Banks turned 30; she said that the milestone brought a greater sense of self-acceptance and a tendency to "giv[e] less fucks".

Banks said that she wrote approximately 50 songs during the recording process, later narrowing the tracklist down to 13. Co-writing every track of III, she described selecting the final songs as "hardest part" for her, stating that the chosen tracks were those that best represented "all the layers of the time of making the record". Banks explained that she was in "a very different place" than she had been even two years earlier, noting: "I've grown more in the last year and a half than I did for three years. Or five." She also attributed her personal development to having the "space and time to actually confront certain things", likening the work on the album to "changing mental scripts that are in your head". Banks collaborated with the producer Buddy Ross, whom she met through her publishers; BJ Burton, who was introduced to her by Ross; and Hudson Mohawke, whom she described as a longtime influence. She emphasized that she preferred to work intensively with a small group of producers rather than collaborating with many at once.

== Theme ==
Every song is about the graphic, gritty details of my life: resentment, guilt, love, lust, jealousy, missing my mom, whatever; it's about little things.

— Banks, talking about III's theme

According to Banks, III is about a "lot of self-love, learning that life is not just black and white". In a press release, Banks described the album as "really about this transition between a girl and a wise woman", adding, that "in between you go through pain and you learn people can lie and you learn those hard lessons that are quite painful". Banks said in an interview with Time that "the more experiences you have and the more pain you've gone through, the wiser you become", and likened the process of confronting harmful thought patterns to "taking a shovel and digging in the mud every day".

III was almost titled Eros, a reference to the ancient Greek god associated with love and sex, but Banks ultimately chose the title III to reflect the beginning, middle, and end of a part of her life. According to Michael Love Michael of Paper, it also alludes to the universe's cycle of threes, such as birth, death, and reincarnation. Banks described the album as her "most nuanced" work, explaining that it documents an emotional cycle in which "romanticism leads to fierce reality checks", ultimately progressing toward "deeper empathy" and "greater love".

Several tracks on III explore themes of self-worth, love, and emotional conflict. "Gimme" centers on asserting one's desires and demanding what one feels entitled to without apology, while "Look What You're Doing to Me" depicts the intensity of being in love, capturing both its excitement and vulnerability. "Contaminated", meanwhile, explores emotional dependency, with Banks describing it as being "addicted" to a toxic relationship and the resulting loss of self.

== Music and lyrics ==
"Gimme"
"Gimme" features synth production, which reflects the album's maximalist sound.

III is an electropop and R&B album. Mark Kennedy of Chicago Sun-Times described "Gimme" as an explicitly erotic club track and identified it as a highlight of III, an album that delves into a "dark, murky pop vein". According to AllMusic's Neil Z. Yeung, the album features "fresh, expansive atmospherics" that "toy with her usual alt-R&B stylings", while it is filled with "walloping bass", "spacious drum fills", and "an endless array of pitched vocal samples", as noted by Sophia Ordaz from Slant Magazine. The Observer's Damien Morris characterized the album as R&B and trap-pop, highlighting its cohesive production and subtle, layered sound.

Writing for The Independent, Roisin O'Connor found that the structure of III guides listeners through "complicated yet nuanced emotions" and that the album traces a narrative in which Banks gradually comes to terms with her pain and is ultimately able to move past it. The album reflects Banks's renewed focus on exploring the meaning of "love, life, and everything else" following a period of reflection, and it continues to place emphasis on style, according to Chris Taylor from DIY. Will Hermes of Rolling Stone noted the record emphasizes a "darker, weirder places", featuring elements such as "menacing sub-bass distortion, suspended silences, grimey organ tones and digitally-abraded vocals". Pitchfork's Noah Yoo also wrote that Banks "seems eager to reestablish her footing and take greater creative risks".

Music critics highlighted Banks's vocals on the album; Kennedy felt her vocal as "warm and hypnotic". Ordaz observed that Banks employed her "most heavy-duty arsenal of sounds to date", with the assistance of producers Buddy Ross and Hudson Mohawke. NME editor Nick Levine observed that her "darkly seductive" sound differs from Lana Del Rey's "glacial alterna-pop". Neil Z. Yeung found that the record features Banks's stronger vocal performances and more refined production. As noted by Ludovic Hunter-Tilney from Financial Times, Banks employs a fluid vocal approach, shifting between a "feathery whisper", digitally altered tones, and a "slurred R&B timbre".

Some critics compared Banks's sounds to her fellow artists; Aimee Cliff from The Guardian noted that III incorporates "streaming-friendly electronic soul ballads" alongside "post-Kanye West maximalist pop". Kennedy wrote that the album uses a style similar to artists such as Tove Lo, Meg Myers, and Lorde. Morris said the album features a layered and understated sound reminiscent of Bon Iver and Billie Eilish, while Banks also brings "a rare, steely delicacy all her own". Cliff and Morris also noted the record's Auto-Tune sounds; Morris highlighted III's frequent use of a "ghostly Auto-Tune choir", describing it as "sighing and whispering encouragement" behind Banks's "increasingly empowered words". Cliff observed that while Banks is often associated with ballads heavily shaped by Auto-Tune, the album includes tracks where her vocals are presented more openly, which allows her natural, unembellished voice greater freedom. Writing for MXDWN, Mark Young highlighted the opening track "Till Now" that Banks "sings a little six-note tune over and over with Auto-Tune, while warped, monster vocals are gradually layered on".

As noted by Levine, III features "intricate production details" alongside "semi-cryptic lyrics" that become more apparent with repeated listens. It also presents "a wiser version" of her, with lyrics that focus on "longing, love, and loss", according to Yeung. Harper's Bazaar's Amy Mackelden noted that the evolution, which Banks described as a "transition between a girl and a wise woman", is significant on III, particularly in its lyrical progress. She contrasted Banks's earlier lyric, "to think you would get me to the altar..." with the line "You are my God, my God, and when you're gone, I'm godless", describing Banks as being "in a constant state of genuflection".

== Release and promotion ==
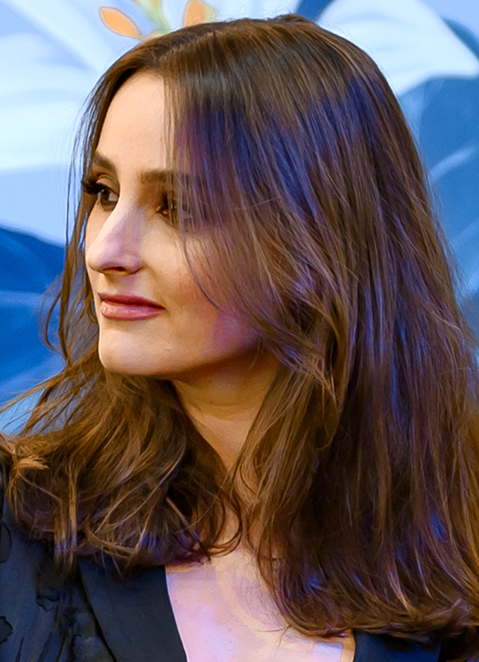
Banks in 2019, on the Space 15 Twenty

Banks revealed the title of III and its release month in an interview with Billboard published on May 24, 2019. Its cover art was released on May 30; the track list was revealed on June 11 alongside the release of the single "Look What You're Doing to Me". III was released as a CD, digital download, LP, and streaming format on July 12, 2019; its limited edition was released exclusively on Urban Outfitters, featuring different cover art from the original.

III's singles failed to chart in any of the US charts or the UK charts. Banks debuted the album's first single "Gimme" on April 29, 2019, on Zane Lowe's Beats 1 radio show. Written by Banks, Josiah Sherman, and produced by BJ Burton, Hudson Mohawke and Kito, it peaked at number 31 in New Zealand Hot Singles chart. The next single, "Look What You're Doing to Me", released on June 11 along with a lyric video, features American pop project Francis and the Lights. Banks unveiled the third and last single "Contaminated" on July 10. The lyric video was released through her YouTube channel on August 22. It peaked at number 30 on New Zealand Hot Singles chart. On September 10, Banks performed the song on The Late Show with Stephen Colbert alongside an orchestra.

In support of the album, Banks launched her third headlining tour, the III Tour. American musicians Kevin Garrett and Finneas supported the tour as an opening act, which began in Toronto on September 3, 2019, and concluded in Miami on October 19. The second leg started from Manchester, England on November 1, to Paris, France on November 21.

== Critical reception ==
Professional ratings
Aggregate scores
Source	Rating
AnyDecentMusic?	6.6/10
Metacritic	76/100
Review scores
Source	Rating
AllMusic	4/5 stars
Clash	8/10
DIY	2/5 stars
The Guardian	2/5 stars
The Independent	4/5 stars
NME	4/5 stars
The Observer	5/5 stars
Pitchfork	6.5/10
Rolling Stone	4/5 stars
Slant Magazine	2.5/5 stars

III received generally positive reviews from music critics. At Metacritic, which assigns a normalized rating out of 100 to reviews from mainstream publications, the album received an average score of 76 based on 11 reviews.

Several critics framed III as a pivotal moment in Banks's career, assessing how it builds on her earlier work while redefining her artistic identity. Narzra Ahmed of Clash described it as a progression for Banks, noting the contrast between its "more upbeat" and its restrained, emotionally driven tracks, which she felt contributed to its thematic duality and sustained appeal. Similarly, The Line of Best Fit's Rhys Harding observed an increased maturity in Banks's work. He characterized the album as "the sound of an artist solidifying her already concrete career", and suggested that she was "becoming a musician ready to take over the world". The Observer writer Damien Morris called it her most impressive album to date, praising the record as "coherent but not repetitive". However, he suggested it lacked the kind of breakout hit that could elevate her to wider recognition. Writing for Slant Magazine, Sophia Ordaz argued that the album "does little to push Banks's own limits" and contended that once its performative edginess was stripped away, it remained difficult to define.

Other reviews focused on III's production choices and sonic textures. Pitchfork's Noah Yoo highlighted BJ Burton's role in shaping its experimental sound, and noted that even though some lyrics were awkward and several tracks were disappointing, the album demonstrates Banks's potential to expand artistically. Will Hermes of Rolling Stone commented on the album's sonic qualities, describing its "distressed" textures as striking within her broader catalog. In a review for Q magazine, Rachel Aroesti similarly suggested that while III did not rival 2014's "Beggin for Thread" in terms of songwriting, the album drew much of its appeal from its "adventurous production". AllMusic's Neil Z. Yeung highlighted several tracks—such as "Stroke", "Alaska", and "Propaganda"—where stylistic shifts, including funk bass flourishes and '80s-inspired synth pop touches, alter the album's mood and hint at new creative directions. He ultimately regarded III as Banks's most accomplished statement, highlighting its emotional intensity. Mark Kennedy of New Zealand Herald stated that one of the album's deficiencies was that Banks's vocals were sometimes overwhelmed by other elements.

Some of the reviewers questioned the album's structural coherence and stylistic balance. Aimee Cliff of The Guardian observed moments of "piercing joy" but characterized the overall mood as "scattered", suggesting that the material did not always land as effectively as the bass-heavy, vengeful template for which Banks is best known. Although Banks was described as sounding freer and exploring new facets of her, some of these attempts were considered less convincing. In contrast, Roisin O'Connor of The Independent regarded III as Banks's "most cohesive album to date", as she restricted "herself to exploring one feeling at a time". DIY's Chris Taylor argued that despite her stated desire to probe deeper themes, the album often prioritizes style over substance. Particular tracks were singled out as undercut by uneven execution, with "Look What You're Doing to Me" described as cluttered and vocally constrained. Nick Levine of NME characterized the album as creating a "supremely intriguing musical world", highlighting its catchy lyrics and distinctive production details, such as the dog-bark sound effect preceding the final chorus of "Gimme".

== Commercial performance ==
In the United States, III debuted and peaked at number 21 on the Billboard 200 chart, while also reaching number three on the Billboard Top Alternative Albums chart. In Canada, the album peaked at number seven on the Billboard Canadian Albums chart.

In Europe, III reached number 57 on the UK Albums Chart and peaked at number 62 on the Scottish Albums Chart. The album also charted in Germany, where it reached number 60, and peaked at number 41 in Switzerland. In Belgium, III appeared on both regional charts, reaching number 113 in Flanders and number 165 in Wallonia, while it peaked at number 185 in France. The album also reached numbers 73 and 25 in Lithuania and Australia, respectively.

== Track listing ==
Standard edition
No.	Title	Writer(s)	Producer(s)	Length
1.	"Till Now"	Jillian Banks; Brandon Burton; Christopher Michael Taylor; Jasmin Mary Tadjiky	BJ Burton^{[a]}; Sohn^{[b]}	2:36
2.	"Gimme"	Banks; Josiah Sherman	Hudson Mohawke; Kito^{[c]}; Burton^{[b]}	3:39
3.	"Contaminated"	Banks; Kevin Owen Garrett; Brandon Treyshun Campbell	Burton^{[a]}; Aron Forbes^{[d]}	4:41
4.	"Stroke"	Banks; Tim Anderson; Campbell; Aron Noah Forbes	Burton^{[a]}; Forbes^{[d]}; Anderson^{[d]}	3:26
5.	"Godless"	Banks; Campbell; Jesse Ward; Lewis Tautaiolefua; Sean Walker	Burton; Ward; Sohn	3:10
6.	"Sawzall"	Banks; Sherman	Buddy Ross	3:39
7.	"Look What You're Doing to Me" (featuring Francis and the Lights)	Banks; Burton; Francis Farewell Starlite; Campbell	Burton; Starlite	4:00
8.	"Hawaiian Mazes"	Banks; Sherman; Paul Epworth; Campbell	Ross; Epworth^{[c]}; Burton^{[b]}	4:03
9.	"Alaska"	Banks; Sherman	Ross; Forbes^{[d]}	3:07
10.	"Propaganda"	Banks; Forbes; Anderson	Burton; Ross; Forbes^{[d]}; Nathaniel Alford^{[d]}	4:05
11.	"The Fall"	Banks; Miguel Pimentel; Anderson; Forbes; Simon Edward Christensen	Burton; Mohawke^{[c]}; Psymun^{[c]}; Forbes^{[b]}	2:56
12.	"If We Were Made of Water"	Banks; Forbes; Campbell	Burton^{[a]}; Ross^{[b]}; Forbes^{[d]}	3:24
13.	"What About Love"	Banks; Sherman; Alejandro Salazar	Ross; Forbes^{[d]}	4:18
Total length:				47:05

=== Notes ===
- ^{^[a]} signifies a main and vocal producer.
- ^{^[b]} signifies an additional producer.
- ^{^[c]} signifies a co-producer.
- ^{^[d]} signifies a vocal producer.

== Credits and personnel ==
Credits were adapted from Tidal and the liner notes.

=== Recording locations ===
- Westlake Recording Studios; West Hollywood (1, 2, 4, 5, 9, 10, 11, 13)
- The Healthfarm (2)
- Panther Palace; Burbank (2, 6, 9, 10, 13)
- Precious; Minneapolis (3, 4, 6, 9, 13)
- Conway Recording Studios; Los Angeles (7, 11)
- Henson Recording Studios; Los Angeles (7)
- The Church Studios; London (8)
- Darling; Minneapolis (12)

=== Musicians ===
- Banks – lead vocals, songwriting
- BJ Burton – synthesizers (1–4, 7, 10, 12); drums (1, 3, 4, 7, 11, 12); programming (1, 3, 4, 7, 12); drum programming (2, 5, 10); arrangement (2, 11); guitar (3, 4, 10, 12); piano (3); bass (4)
- Sohn – synthesizers (1, 5, 7); bass (1); drums (5)
- Hudson Mohawke – synthesizers, drum programming (2); 808 bass; programming (11)
- Mark McGee – programming (3)
- Jake Hanson – guitar (3)
- Ben Lester – pedal steel guitar (3, 4, 12)
- Trevor Hagen – trumpet (3)
- Nick Sanborn – synthesizers, bass (4)
- Lazerbeak – programming (4)
- Buddy Ross – keyboards (6, 9, 13); bass (6, 9, 10, 13); drums (6, 8–10, 12); piano (8, 13); Wurlitzer, strings (8); synthesizers (8, 10, 12); string arrangement (13)
- Jake Luppen – electric guitar (6)
- Chais Kinder – electric guitar (6); drums, synthesizer (10)
- Aliyah Hernandez – vocals (6)
- Jami Hernandez – vocals (6)
- Francis Farewell Starlite – vocals, piano, table drums (7)
- Paul Epworth – keyboards, bass (8)
- Aron Forbes – acoustic guitar (11)
- Rob Moose – string arrangements (11, 12); strings (12)
- Simon Edward Christensen p/k/a Psymun – drum programming (claps), vocal chop/background (11)
- JT Bates – drums (12)
- Georgie Banks Feil – vocals (13)
- Owen Pallett – string arrangement, violin, viola (13)
- Amy Laing – cello (13)

=== Technical ===
- BJ Burton – production (1, 3–5, 7, 10–12); vocal production (1, 3, 4, 12); engineering (1–5, 7, 11, 12); additional production (2, 8); executive production
- Sohn – additional production (1); production (5)
- Hudson Mohawke – production, engineering (2); co-production (11)
- Kito – co-production (2)
- Ross Birchard – engineering (2)
- Buddy Ross – engineering (2, 6, 8–10, 13); production (6, 8–10, 13); additional production (12)
- Aron Forbes – engineering (3, 11, 12); vocal production (3, 4, 9, 10, 12, 13); additional production (11)
- Sam Tusa – engineering assistance (3, 4, 6, 12, 13)
- Tim Anderson – vocal production (4)
- Jesse Ward – production (5)
- Tom Kahre – engineering (5, 9)
- Nathaniel Alford – engineering (5, 10); vocal production (10)
- John DeBold – engineering assistance (6, 13)
- Francis Farewell Starlite – production (7)
- Paul Epworth – co-production (8)
- Luke Pickering – engineering assistance (8)
- Psymun – co-production (11)
- Jillian Banks – executive production
- Tom Elmhirst – mixing
- Brandon Bost – engineering for mix
- Huntley Miller – mastering (1–12)
- Randy Merrill – mastering (13)

=== Artwork ===
- J & Associates – artwork
- Steph Wilson – photography

== Charts ==
Weekly chart performance
Chart (2019)	Peak position
Australian Albums (ARIA)	25
Belgian Albums (Ultratop Flanders)	113
Belgian Albums (Ultratop Wallonia)	165
Canadian Albums (Billboard)	7
French Albums (SNEP)	185
German Albums (Offizielle Top 100)	60
Lithuanian Albums (AGATA)	73
Scottish Albums (Official Charts)	62
Swiss Albums (Schweizer Hitparade)	41
UK Albums (Official Charts)	57
US Billboard 200	21
US Top Alternative Albums (Billboard)	3

== Release history ==
List of release dates and formats
Region	Date	Format	Label	Ref.
Various	July 12, 2019	CD; digital download; LP; streaming	Harvest	
