= Gimme (Banks song) =

2019 single by Banks

Single by Banks

from the album III
- Released: April 29, 2019
- Studio: The Healthfarm; Westlake (West Hollywood, California); Panther Palace (Burbank, California)
- Genre: Electropop; electro-R&B
- Length: 3:39
- Label: Harvest
- Songwriters: Jillian Banks; Josiah Sherman
- Producers: Hudson Mohawke; Kito; BJ Burton

Banks singles chronology
"Underdog" (2017)	"Gimme" (2019)	"Look What You're Doing To Me" (2019)

Music video
- "Gimme" on YouTube

"Gimme" is a song by American singer and songwriter Banks from her third studio album, III (2019). It was released as the album's lead single on April 29, 2019, and debuted on Zane Lowe's Beats 1 radio show. The electro-R&B song was written by Banks and Josiah Sherman and produced by Hudson Mohawke, Kito, and BJ Burton.

== Composition ==
"Gimme" is a "heavily electronic" pop and electro-R&B song that was written by Banks and Josiah Sherman and produced by Hudson Mohawke, Kito, and BJ Burton. It was written in the key of D minor, "Gimme" has a tempo of 120 beats per minute. The song's production is made of funky beats and ethereal vocals with an aggressive distorted track, bouncing keyboards and pitched vocals. According to Banks, "Gimme" is about getting what you want. It’s about knowing what you deserve, saying it out loud, and demanding it with no apologies.

== Music video ==
The music video for "Gimme" was directed by Matty Peacock and published on May 23, 2019, on Banks' Vevo channel. The video begins with Banks alone in the dark with a multicolored laser light that pulsates to the song's melody in a pyramid form. She starts playing a choreography while one beam is pointing directly downwards. Eventually she is joined by other dancers as the light starts growing more numerous.

== Credits and personnel ==
Credits adapted from the liner notes of III.

=== Recording ===
- Engineered at The Healthfarm, Westlake Recording Studios (West Hollywood, California) and Panther Palace (Burbank, California)
- Mixed at Conway Recording Studios (Los Angeles, California) and Electric Lady Studios (New York City, New York)
- Mastered at HM Mastering (Minneapolis, Minnesota)

=== Personnel ===
- Banks – vocals
- Hudson Mohawke – production, engineering, synthesizers, drum programming
- Kito – co-production
- BJ Burton – additional production, engineering, drum programming, synthesizers, arrangement
- Ross Birchard – engineering
- Buddy Ross – engineering
- Tom Elmhirst – mixing
- Brandon Bost – engineering for mix
- Huntley Miller – mastering

== Charts ==
Chart performance for "Gimme"
Chart (2019)	Peak position
New Zealand Hot Singles (RMNZ)	31

== Release history ==
Release dates and formats for "Gimme"
Region	Date	Format	Label	Ref.
Various	April 29, 2019	Digital download; streaming	Harvest	
