= Kevin Garrett (musician) =

American singer-songwriter (born 1991)

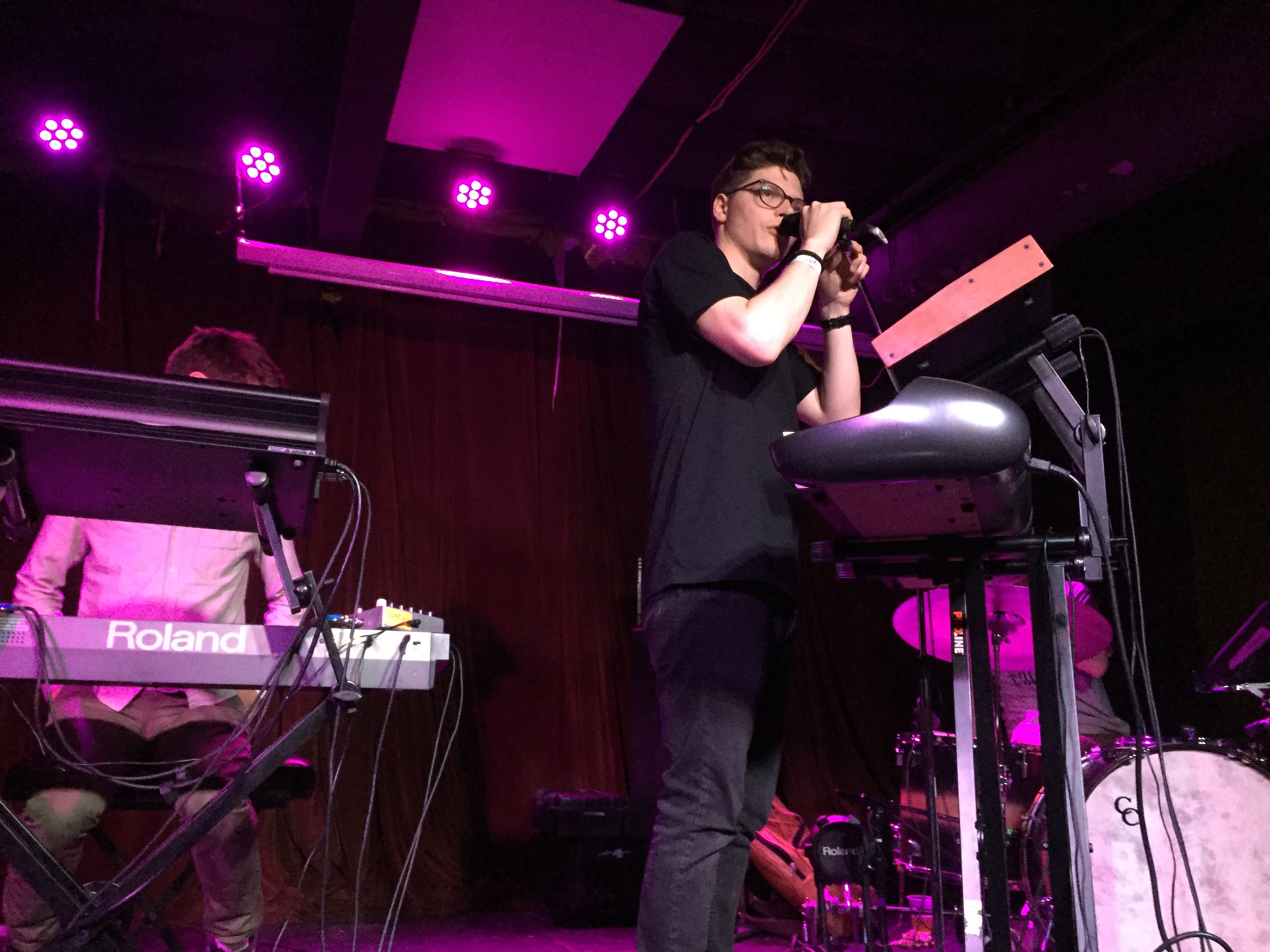
- Kevin Garrett performing at The Demo in St. Louis, Missouri.

Background information
- Born: March 25, 1991 (age 35); Pittsburgh, Pennsylvania, U.S.
- Origin: Pittsburgh, Pennsylvania, U.S.
- Genres: Contemporary R&B; soul; pop
- Occupations: Musician; singer-songwriter; producer
- Instruments: Piano; keyboards; guitar; violin
- Years active: 2014–present
- Website: www.kevingarrettmusic.com

Kevin Garrett (born March 25, 1991) is an American musician from Pittsburgh, Pennsylvania based out of Brooklyn, New York. He has released two EPs, as well as a full-length album, and was nominated for a Grammy Award for his work on Beyoncé's album Lemonade.

== Early life ==
Garrett was born on March 25, 1991, in Pittsburgh, Pennsylvania. He was raised in Point Breeze. His first musical experience was playing the violin at a very young age, but he began writing his own songs later in life.

== Career ==
Garrett is signed to Jay-Z's Roc Nation for publishing, and in 2018, he signed a worldwide recording deal with AWAL, Kobalt Music's recording company.

His debut EP, Mellow Drama, was released on April 7, 2015. Garrett co-wrote and co-produced "Pray You Catch Me", the lead track on Beyoncé's 2016 album, Lemonade. He was nominated for a Grammy Award for his work on the album.

In 2017 he released his second EP, False Hope. The release was accompanied by music videos for "Little Bit of You" and "Pulling Me Under", directed by Jean Claude Billmaier, and "Stranglehold" directed by Shervin Lainez.

In October 2018, Garrett released the single "In Case I Don't Feel", from his full-length debut, Hoax, which came out on March 22, 2019.

== Performances ==
Garrett has opened for Mumford & Sons, Alessia Cara, James Vincent McMorrow, X Ambassadors, James Bay, and Oh Wonder. In 2017 he headlined his False Hope tour, with ARIZONA as openers. He has also performed at Bonnaroo, Sasquatch! Music Festival, and the Firefly Music Festival.

== Personal life ==
From 2016 to 2018, Garrett was in a relationship with Canadian singer Alessia Cara. Garrett studied music technology at New York University.

== Awards ==
Year	Award	Category	Work	Result
2017	Grammy Award	Album of the Year	Lemonade by Beyoncé	Nominated

== Discography ==
=== Albums ===
List of full-length albums, with selected details
Title	Album details
Hoax	Released: March 22, 2019; Label: KG Music; Formats: Vinyl, CD, digital download

=== EPs ===
List of extended plays, with selected details
Title	Album details
Mellow Drama	Released: April 7, 2015; Label: Kevin Garrett; Formats: Digital download
False Hope	Released: February 3, 2017; Label: Kevin Garrett; Formats: Digital download
Made Up Lost Time	Released: February 21, 2020; Label: Kevin Garrett, AWAL; Formats: Digital download

=== Singles ===
==== as lead artist ====
Title	Year	Album
"Colouring"	2014	Mellow Drama EP
"Control"	2015	Mellow Drama EP
"Refuse"	2015	Non-album single
"Precious"	2016	Non-album single
"Stranglehold"	2017	False Hope EP
"Little Bit of You"	2017	False Hope EP
"In Case I Don't Feel"	2018	Hoax
"Don't Rush"	2019	Hoax
"Factor In"	2019	Made Up Lost Time
"Every Time You Go Away" (with Lennon Stella)	2020	Non-album single
“Lonely Like Me”	2021	Non-album single

==== as featured artist ====
Title	Year	Album
"Baby" (KINGDM featuring Kevin Garrett)	2016	Non-album single
"Leave" (Whole Doubts featuring Kevin Garrett)	2017	Non-album single

=== Guest appearances ===
List of non-single guest appearances, with other performing artists, showing year released and album name
Title	Year	Other artist(s)	Album
"Do You Remember"	2019	Rudimental	Toast to Our Differences

=== Songwriting and Production Credits ===
==== songs written ====
Year	Artist	Album	Song	Co-written with
2016	KINGDM	Non-album single	"Baby" feat. Kevin Garrett	Luca Masini, Beuben Butler, Samuel George Lewis
2016	Beyoncé	Lemonade	"Pray You Catch Me"	Beyoncé Knowles-Carter, James Blake
2016	Justine Skye	Ultraviolet	"U Don't Know" feat. Wizkid	Justine Skye, Jaramaye Daniels, Christopher Crowhurst, Ayodeji Balogun
2017	Whole Doubts	Non-album single	"Leave" feat. Kevin Garrett	Phoebe Ryan, Bryan Frizel, Aaron Kleinstub
2017	Rudimental	Toast to Our Differences	"Do You Remember" feat. Kevin Garrett	Amir Izadkhah, Piers Aggett, Kesi Dryden, Leon Rolle
2019	Banks	III	"Contaminated"	Jillian Banks, Brandon Treyshun Campbell
2019	Vérité	New Skin	"Faded"	Kelsey Byrne, Jason Wu, Zachary Nicita
2020	Lennon Stella	Three. Two. One.	"Bend Over Backwards"	Lennon Stella, Simon Wilcox, Sammy Witte, James Ryan Ho
2025	Cynthia Erivo	I Forgive You	"Holy Refrain"	Cynthia Erivo, Will Wells
2025	Cynthia Erivo	I Forgive You	"Brick by Brick"	Cynthia Erivo, Will Wells
2025	Midnight 'Til Morning	Afterglow	"Navy Eyes"	Evan Cline, WYNNE

==== songs produced ====
Year	Artist	Album	Song	Produced with
2016	Beyoncé	Lemonade	"Pray You Catch Me"	Beyoncé, Jeremy McDonald
2025	Cynthia Erivo	I Forgive You	"Holy Refrain"	Cynthia Erivo, Will Wells
2025	Cynthia Erivo	I Forgive You	"Brick by Brick"	Cynthia Erivo, Will Wells
