= I Forgive You (album) =

2025 studio album by Cynthia Erivo

- Standard cover

Studio album by Cynthia Erivo
- Released: 6 June 2025
- Genres: R&B; gospel; folk; pop
- Length: 60:03
- Labels: Verve; Republic
- Producers: Al Cleveland III; Cynthia Erivo; Ebenezer Maxwell; The Imports; Kevin Garrett; Manana; Phonikz; Will Wells; Xela; Zach Golden

Cynthia Erivo chronology
Wicked: The Soundtrack (2024)	I Forgive You (2025)	Wicked: For Good – The Soundtrack (2025)

Singles from I Forgive You
- 1. "Replay" Released: 28 February 2025; 2. "Worst of Me" Released: 11 April 2025

I Forgive You is the second studio album by British singer-songwriter Cynthia Erivo. It was released on 6 June 2025, through Verve and Republic Records. Developed over two years in collaboration with songwriter and producer Will Wells, the album features various genres, such as pop, R&B, Brit pop, folk, and gospel. Recorded during breaks from filming Wicked (2024), Erivo described it as a collection of stories about forgiveness, and journeys through love, heartbreak, and renewal.

I Forgive You was critically acclaimed by critics for its themes, production, and emotional honesty. It peaked at number 165 on the US Billboard 200.

== Background and development ==
With her 2021 debut studio album, Ch. 1 Vs. 1, Erivo felt it lacked cohesion and didn't fully showcase her vocal abilities. Recorded during breaks from filming Wicked (2024), I Forgive You was described as "a collection of stories and songs that are both personal for things that are happening now, things that have happened in the past, and I think some of which I have had to forgive people for." Erivo added, "And honestly, some of which I've had to forgive myself for." The album was developed over a period of more than two years, including collaborating with songwriter and producer Will Wells. The second single, "Worst of Me", was released on 11 April 2025, following the lead single "Replay". At a listening event in London, Erivo shared that I Forgive You reflects a desire to fully embrace and express all facets of herself, including her sensuality and sexuality; an aspect she noted is often overlooked, particularly for Black women. She cited artists like Toni Braxton and Prince as inspirations, referencing their bold exploration of such themes in music. During the event, she previewed several tracks from the album, including "Why", "More Than Twice", "Best for Me", "She Said", "I Choose Love", and "Brick by Brick".

== Composition ==
I Forgive You blends various genres such as pop, R&B, Brit pop, folk, and gospel. Credited as a co-writer for each track, Erivo experiments with vocal extremes and unconventional techniques, such as whistling, yodelling, and percussive sounds made with her fingernails. She also explores themes of forgiveness and humanity, aiming to present a more vulnerable, authentic self. Softer and more intimate than her past work, the album emphasises forgiveness and vulnerability. According to a press release, it also "[traces] a personal, poetic and poignant journey through romance, heartbreak, love, forgiveness, rebirth and new beginnings". The album's "sensual grooves and breathy vocals" reflect her return to soul influences like Marvin Gaye and Brandy. Described by Erivo as more unified than her debut, the album aims to present a complete and honest self.

== Critical reception ==
Professional ratings
Review scores
Source	Rating
Attitude	4/5 stars
The Skinny	4/5 stars

Variety noted that while I Forgive You contains elements of contemporary R&B, its overall sound leans more toward a moody, Hozier-like aesthetic. The review also highlighted Erivo's restrained vocal delivery, diverging from expectations of theatrical belting. Melodic Magazine praised the album's emotional honesty and thoughtful composition, describing it as a musically impressive work that explores love, pain, and resilience with refreshing sincerity. Attitude described the album as a sonic reflection of Erivo's powerful presence and identity, praising its sophistication and emotional intensity, while noting its ambitious length as a minor drawback. The Skinny praised I Forgive You as a bold blend of genres — from gospel and folk to pop and even yodelling — calling it a raw and expressive statement of intent that showcases Erivo's artistry beyond a vanity project.

== Track listing ==
I Forgive You – standard edition
No.	Title	Writer(s)	Producer(s)	Length
1.	"Why (Interlude)"	Annie Lennox	Cynthia Erivo; Will Wells	0:41
2.	"Best for Me"	Erivo; Wells; Tayla Parx	Erivo; Wells	3:27
3.	"More Than Twice"	Erivo; Thato Modika; Ndumiso Manana	Erivo; Wells; Phonikz; Manana	4:33
4.	"You First"	Erivo; Manana; Bubele Booi; David Balshaw; Ebenezer Maxwell	Erivo; Wells; Phonikz; The Imports; Maxwell	4:29
5.	"Save Me from You"	Erivo; Wells	Erivo; Wells; Al Cleveland III	4:35
6.	"Worst of Me"	Erivo; Wells; Jessica Agombar	Erivo; Wells	3:27
7.	"I Want You (Interlude)"	Arthur Ross; Leon Ware	Erivo; Wells	1:08
8.	"She Said"	Erivo; Wells; Alex Sutton	Erivo; Wells; Xela	2:43
9.	"What You Want"	Erivo; Modika; Manana	Erivo; Wells; Phonikz; Manana	3:50
10.	"Play the Woman"	Erivo; Wells; Justin Tranter	Erivo; Wells; Phonikz; Manana	3:13
11.	"Push and Pull"	Erivo; Wells; Zach Golden; Daniel Watts; Anthony Ramos	Erivo; Wells; Golden	3:20
12.	"Until You Saw Me (Interlude)"	Erivo; Wells	Erivo; Wells	0:43
13.	"Holy Refrain"	Erivo; Wells; Kevin Garrett	Erivo; Wells; Garrett	3:56
14.	"I Choose Love"	Erivo; Wells; Tranter	Erivo; Wells	3:27
15.	"Be Okay"	Erivo; Wells	Erivo; Wells	2:16
16.	"How Could I Fall"	Erivo; Wells	Erivo; Wells	3:01
17.	"I Forgive You (Interlude)"	Erivo; Wells; Wolfgang Amadeus Mozart	Erivo; Wells	1:39
18.	"Replay"	Erivo; Wells; Tranter	Erivo; Wells; Shawn Wasabi^{[a]}	3:40
19.	"Brick by Brick"	Erivo; Wells; Garrett	Erivo; Wells; Garrett	5:17
20.	"Grace"	Erivo; Wells; Bianca Atterberry	Erivo; Wells	4:16
Total length:				60:03

I Forgive You – A cappella edition
No.	Title	Length
21.	"Best for Me" (A cappella)	3:07
22.	"More Than Twice" (A cappella)	4:36
23.	"You First" (A cappella)	4:23
24.	"Save Me from You" (A cappella)	4:35
25.	"Worst of Me" (A cappella)	3:27
26.	"I Choose Love" (A cappella)	3:27
27.	"Brick by Brick" (A cappella)	5:18
Total length:		88:56

=== Note ===
- ^{^[a]} signifies an additional producer.

== Personnel ==
Credits were adapted from Tidal.

=== Musicians ===
- Cynthia Erivo – vocals, vocal arrangements (all tracks); background vocals (tracks 2–19), whistle (2, 15, 18)
- Al Cleveland III – drums (tracks 2, 3, 5, 6, 8, 10, 11, 13, 14, 16, 18, 20), string arrangement (5)
- Kyle Miles – bass guitar (tracks 2, 3, 5, 6, 8, 13, 14, 16, 18, 20), guitar (18)
- Will Wells – string arrangement (tracks 2, 4–6, 9, 10, 14, 19, 20), orchestra (2, 4–6, 10, 14, 19, 20), conductor (2, 4, 5, 9, 10, 19, 20), piano (2, 5, 6, 8, 13, 14, 20), programming (2, 5, 6, 10, 11, 18, 19), keyboards (2, 5, 6, 10, 13, 16, 19), bass guitar (2, 5, 10, 14), guitar (5), Rhodes (11), organ (13), drum programming (14), acoustic guitar (16, 20)
- Emily Hope Price – cello (tracks 2, 4–6, 9, 10, 14, 19, 20)
- Malcolm Parson – cello (tracks 2, 4–6, 9, 10, 14, 19, 20)
- Sasha Ono – cello (tracks 2, 4–6, 9, 10, 14, 19, 20)
- Terrence Thornhill – cello (tracks 2, 4–6, 9, 10, 14, 19, 20)
- Brian Holtz – double bass (tracks 2, 4–6, 9, 10, 14, 19, 20)
- Chris Johnson – double bass (tracks 2, 4–6, 9, 10, 14, 19, 20)
- Gavin Hardy – double bass (tracks 2, 4–6, 9, 10, 14, 19, 20)
- Drew Griffin – viola (tracks 2, 4–6, 9, 10, 14, 19, 20)
- Jarvis Benson – viola (tracks 2, 4–6, 9, 10, 14, 19, 20)
- Kayla Williams – viola (tracks 2, 4–6, 9, 10, 14, 19, 20)
- Laura Sacks – viola (tracks 2, 4–6, 9, 10, 14, 19, 20)
- Mario Gotoh – viola (tracks 2, 4–6, 9, 10, 14, 19, 20)
- Tia Allen – viola (tracks 2, 4–6, 9, 10, 14, 19, 20)
- Adriana Molello – violin (tracks 2, 4–6, 9, 10, 14, 19, 20)
- Alex Weill – Concertmaster - violin (tracks 2, 4–6, 9, 10, 14, 19, 20)
- Chiara Fasi – violin (tracks 2, 4–6, 9, 10, 14, 19, 20)
- Christiana Liberis – violin (tracks 2, 4–6, 9, 10, 14, 19, 20)
- Earl Maneein – violin (tracks 2, 4–6, 9, 10, 14, 19, 20)
- Francesca Dardani – violin (tracks 2, 4–6, 9, 10, 14, 19, 20)
- Hajnal Pivnick – violin (tracks 2, 4–6, 9, 10, 14, 19, 20)
- Josh Henderson – violin (tracks 2, 4–6, 9, 10, 14, 19, 20)
- Juliette Jones – violin (tracks 2, 4–6, 9, 10, 14, 19, 20)
- Kevin Kuh – violin (tracks 2, 4–6, 9, 10, 14, 19, 20)
- Lavina Pavlish – violin (tracks 2, 4–6, 9, 10, 14, 19, 20)
- Megan Yee – violin (tracks 2, 4–6, 9, 10, 14, 19, 20)
- Monique Brooke Roberts – violin (tracks 2, 4–6, 9, 10, 14, 19, 20)
- Pierce Martin – violin (tracks 2, 4–6, 9, 10, 14, 19, 20)
- Sita Chay – violin (tracks 2, 4–6, 9, 10, 14, 19, 20)
- Tiffany Weiss – violin (tracks 2, 4–6, 9, 10, 14, 19, 20)
- Susan Mandel – strings direction (tracks 2, 5, 6, 9, 10, 14), string arrangement (19, 20)
- Andrew Renfroe – electric guitar (track 2), guitar (6, 10)
- Trey Macias – percussion (tracks 2, 9, 14, 16, 19, 20)
- Thato Modika – guitar (tracks 3, 9)
- Manana – piano (tracks 3, 9), synth bass (3)
- Alex Sutton – guitar (tracks 6, 9, 10), acoustic guitar (8, 14)
- Elena Pinderhughes – flute (track 9)
- Zach Golden – bass guitar, guitar, keyboards, programming (track 11)
- Kevin Garrett – acoustic guitar (tracks 13, 19, 20); keyboards, percussion (13, 19); background vocals, vocal arrangement (13); piano (19)
- Myra Choo – violin (track 16)
- Shawn Wasabi – programming (track 18)

=== Technical ===
- Randy Merrill – mastering
- Serban Ghenea – mixing
- Will Wells – engineering, vocal production
- Myra Choo – engineering
- Zach Golden – engineering (track 11)
- Kevin Garrett – engineering (track 13)
- Clay Blair – engineering (track 18), additional engineering (3–6, 8–10, 13, 14, 16, 20)
- Cynthia Erivo – vocal production
- Bryce Bordone – additional mixing
- Kevin Brunhober – additional engineering (tracks 1, 2, 20)
- Jake Prein – additional engineering (tracks 2, 3, 5–8, 13, 16, 19)
- Joey Karz – additional engineering (tracks 2, 8, 16)
- Milan Beker – additional engineering (tracks 2–4, 6, 8–10, 14–16, 18, 20)
- Jose Morfin – additional engineering (tracks 3, 5, 9, 13, 20)
- Seth Taylor – additional engineering (tracks 5, 11, 17)
- Javon Gant-Graham – additional engineering (tracks 6, 10, 14, 18)
- Al Cleveland III – additional engineering (track 11)
- Augusto Sanchez – additional engineering (tracks 12, 13)
- Grant Morgan – additional engineering (track 19)

== Charts ==
Chart (2025)	Peak position
Scottish Albums (Official Charts)	19
UK Albums Sales (OCC)	13
UK R&B Albums (Official Charts)	2
US Billboard 200	165
US Top R&B/Hip-Hop Albums (Billboard)	45
