= Pray You Catch Me =

Song by Beyoncé

from the album Lemonade
- Recorded: September 2015
- Studio: Conway Studios, Los Angeles, California
- Genre: R&B; downtempo
- Length: 3:16
- Label: Parkwood; Columbia
- Songwriters: Kevin Garrett; Beyoncé; James Blake
- Producers: Kevin Garrett; Beyoncé

"Pray You Catch Me" is a song by American singer Beyoncé. It is the first track on her sixth studio album, Lemonade (2016), released through Parkwood Entertainment and Columbia Records. The song's music video is part of Beyoncé's 2016 film Lemonade, aired on HBO alongside the album's release.

== Production and composition ==
The song was recorded at Conway Studios in Los Angeles, California in September 2015. Knowles wrote the song with Kevin Garrett and James Blake and produced it with the former. "Pray You Catch Me" is a downtempo song. According to the sheet music published by Sony/ATV Music Publishing on Musicnotes.com the song is composed in the key of G♯ minor and set in 4/4 and 5/4 time signatures at a slow tempo of 58 beats per minute. Knowles's vocal range spawns from the low note F♯_{3} to the high note G♯_{4}. The song begins with Knowles singing, "You can taste the dishonesty / It’s all over your breath as you pass it off so cavalier." NME's Larry Bartleet described the song as a "piano and strings-backed ballad. Everest True from The Independent described it as a "stately, intense and secret – there is just the occasional throb of bass and softened beat to accentuate her message. With other lyrics, this could be a love song."

== Commercial performance ==
After the release of Lemonade, "Pray You Catch Me" debuted on Billboard Hot 100 at number 37 on the chart dating May 14, 2016. It also peaked on the Hot R&B/Hip-Hop songs chart at number 22.

== Live performance ==
Beyoncé performed the song at the 2016 VMAs as part of a medley of songs from her Lemonade album.

== Usage in media ==
On May 12, 2016, the song was included in the episode "At Last" of Grey's Anatomy.

== Charts ==
Chart (2016)	Peak position
Australia (ARIA)	97
Australia Urban Singles (ARIA)	11
Canada Hot 100 (Billboard)	71
France (SNEP)	96
Hungary (Single Top 40)	30
Scottish Singles Sales (Official Charts)	50
Sweden Heatseeker (Sverigetopplistan)	15
UK Singles (Official Charts)	52
UK Hip Hop/R&B (Official Charts)	28
US Billboard Hot 100	37
US Hot R&B/Hip-Hop Songs (Billboard)	22

== Certifications ==
Region	Certification	Certified units/sales
United States (RIAA)	Platinum	1,000,000^{‡}
^{‡} Sales+streaming figures based on certification alone.
