= The Devil (Banks song) =

Single by Banks

from the album Serpentina
- Released: June 16, 2021
- Length: 2:48
- Label: AWAL; Her Name Is Banks
- Songwriters: Jillian Rose Banks; Jeff "Gitty" Gitelman; Alexander Shuckburgh
- Producers: Banks; Jeff Gitelman; Al Shux

Banks singles chronology
"Contaminated" (2019)	"The Devil" (2021)	"Skinnydipped" (2021)

Music video
- "The Devil" on YouTube

"The Devil" is a song by American singer-songwriter Banks, released on June 16, 2021 as the lead single from her fourth studio album, Serpentina (2022). It marked her first release as an independent artist following her departure from a major label.

"The Devil" centers on themes of transformation, self-empowerment, and overcoming personal struggles, with Banks framing the titular figure as a symbol of strength and control. Musically, it is built around a dark, low-register bass line and subdued vocals. An accompanying music video, co-directed by Banks and Jenna Marsh, presents a stylized, draws inspiration from the 1992 films Dracula and Death Becomes Her.

== Release and theme ==
Following her third studio album III (2019) and an EP Live and Stripped (2020), Banks debuted "The Devil" as the lead single from her next album. It marked her first single to be released as an independent artist. According to Banks, it reflects a shift in perspective, with the "titular" figure representing "her newfound sense of control". She explained that "in order to overcome those demons, you have to be stronger than a demon", adding, "What's stronger than a demon? A devil." She further stated: "I couldn't be some kind, sweet, polite person to get over the certain things that I needed to get over. You have to be a devil." In the single's press release, the song was informed by a "traumatic break-up and [mind-and-body wake-up calls"; Flood Magazine's Margaret Farrell found that it signals "both a new personal and musical chapter" for Banks.

== Composition ==
"The Devil" is built around a dark, low-register bass line, opening with the line "Someone write my new name down". Banks described the song as a form of release, stating, "It's nice to expel your demons, cleanse the palate before a new chapter starts", and adding that it is about "overcoming your demons and being stronger than them". According to her, the track reflects this theme in lyrics such as "Pullin' back all the opinions / I ain't really bothered and it tastes so good". Lyrically, it centers on themes of metamorphosis and finds a "slinky power in embracing the darkness within", as she sings, "Way down I go / Got a one-way ticket and the Devil waiting / Call from down low / Naive, I know".

== Music video ==
A music video for "The Devil" was co-directed by Banks and Jenna Marsh, and was inspired by 1992 films, Dracula and Death Becomes Her. Banks described the video as representing the "twisted, surreal, and playful world" she inhabits as the devil. She stated that in this setting "no demon can touch me", and explained that the concept depicts her hypnotizing and confining demons while she "dance[s], fly[ies], and play[s] with [her] devil sisters".

== Personnel ==
Credits were adapted from Tidal.

- Banks – lead vocals, songwriter, producer
- Jeff "Gitty" Gitelman – songwriter, producer
- Alexander Shuckburgh – songwriter, producer

== Release history ==
List of release dates and formats
Region	Date	Format(s)	Label	Ref.
Various	June 16, 2021	Digital download; streaming	AWAL; Her Name Is Banks	
