= Claws (song) =

2020 single by Charli XCX

- Designed by Sara Cwynar

Single by Charli XCX

from the album How I'm Feeling Now
- Released: 23 April 2020
- Recorded: April 9, 2020
- Genre: Hyperpop; glitch pop; electropop
- Length: 2:29
- Label: Atlantic; Asylum
- Songwriters: Charlotte Aitchison; Dylan Brady; BJ Burton
- Producer: Dylan Brady

Charli XCX singles chronology
"Forever" (2020)	"Claws" (2020)	"I Finally Understand" (2020)

Music video
- "Claws" on YouTube

"Claws" (stylized in all lowercase) is a song by British singer Charli XCX. It was released on 23 April 2020 as the second single from her fourth studio album, How I'm Feeling Now (2020). Like the previous single "Forever", the song has three official cover artworks, designed by Timothy Luke, Naked Cherry and Sara Cwynar. "Claws" was named one of the best songs of 2020 by NME and Rolling Stone.

== Background ==
On 10 April 2020, Charli XCX posted a series of clips from upcoming songs on Twitter, asking her fans which one they liked best. On 13 April 2020, she announced that "Claws" would be the next single, though she was considering calling it "I Like" instead. The following day she confirmed that "Claws" would be the official title of the song.

== Composition ==
Produced by Dylan Brady of 100 Gecs, "Claws" is an electropop, glitch pop, and hyperpop song with elements of hip hop, electronica, pop and trance. It is about love in the time of self-isolation, inspired by her then-boyfriend Huck Kwong, whom she was quarantined with in the wake of the COVID-19 pandemic. About the song's production, Alex Robert Ross of The Fader said "it sounds like getting sucked into a modem and spat back out in a brightly colored cartoon".

== Critical reception ==
Emily Tan from Spin described the beginning of the song as an "autotuned robotic snippet" that "transitions into a mid-tempo bounce" as "Charli explains how much she likes someone". Michael Love Michael of Paper wrote that the song "instantly sinks its claws into you and [won't] let go", and felt that "[people will] like everything about it". In a different article for the same publication, Matt Moen described the song as a "puppy dog-eyed bop about lovestruck infatuation" laid over "top of blown-out trap drums and caustic synths before descending into a euphoric trance break that comes in as the icing on the cake". Moen also talked about the "jittery effects" and "mindless repetition" that was "Stylistically more in line with the futuristic sound [on] Charli" as the track "reasserts her dominance as being one of pop's foremost innovators". Writing for DIY, Lisa Wright described the song as a "kitschy electro-pop nugget that draws heavily on her PC Music affiliation", that was "Full of video game-like twinkles and saccharine sweet lyrics", ultimately giving the feeling of being "trapped inside Candy Crush with only a couple of pills and some high-sheen production to save you".

In an article from Stereogum, "Claws" was listed one of the five best songs of the week on April 24, as James wrote that the song was a "burst of pure elation", and lyrics that were the "best kind of Charli gibberish, earnest and winking in equal measure". In addition to feeling that this was "exactly the kind of music that [he wants] to hear right now, music that makes [him] feel cool and safe and lets [him] forget about everything that's going on". Trey Alston from MTV News wrote that Charli XCX "is in need of a software upgrade as she malfunctions while mechanically declaring her infatuation with someone", with Alston mentioning Optimus Prime. Alston also felt like the song "soundtracks the evolution of cybernetic love through a futuristic palette of harsh sounds and feathery, sweet vocals", with Charli XCX's voice that was "distinctly human as the war of the machines rages on in the background". Luke Hanson of Mxdwn mentioned the features of "short, staccato bursts of vocal- and synth-driven energy", in addition to several genres that influenced the production such as electronica that creates a "constant pop spirit to create a hypnotic, futuristic sound in which listeners can effortlessly get lost", with lyrics that tell a "story and capture the sentiment of being in love in lockdown, and the near-discord yet ultimate jubilation that can ultimately come from it".

In April 2022, Clash listed the song among the 17 best of Charli XCX's songs, with Gem Stokes stating that it "plays a part in the hyper-pop style that Charli XCX has come to be associated with, detailing a love that sounds so futuristic it could only ever have been penned by Charli. Glittering synths tussle with some of the fan-named 'pots and pans' percussive sounds for a rich, well-mixed pop banger."

== Music video ==
The music video for the song was released onto YouTube on 1 May. Given a premiere treatment, the video was directed by Charlotte Rutherford and featured XCX's boyfriend at the time, Huck Kwong. The video was filmed in a vlog-type style on a green screen keyed-in backgrounds that included rainbows, icebergs, high heels, and sports cars. Since the video's debut, she has released the non-edited green screen, allowing fans to download and play with various backgrounds.

== Charts ==
Chart (2020)	Peak position
New Zealand Hot Singles (RMNZ)	25

== Personnel ==
Credits adapted from Tidal

- Charli XCX – vocals, songwriting
- Dylan Brady – songwriting, production, vocal production
- BJ Burton – songwriting, vocal production, engineering
- Geoff Swan – mixing
- Stuart Hawkes – mastering
- Niko Battistini – assistant mix engineer
