= How I'm Feeling Now =

Studio album by Charli XCX
- Released: 15 May 2020
- Recorded: May 2017 – May 2020 (Note: "Party 4 U" originally had a demo made in May 2017. The rest of the album was recorded in the six weeks timespan.)
- Studios: Charli's house; BJ's Place; PC Music Studios Montana; Dog Show Studio; Ten87 Studios
- Genres: Hyperpop; electropop; experimental pop; deconstructed club; bubblegum bass; glitch pop
- Length: 37:00
- Labels: Atlantic; Asylum
- Producers: Dylan Brady; BJ Burton; A. G. Cook; Dijon; Benjamin Keating; Danny L Harle

Charli XCX chronology
| Charli (2019) | How I'm Feeling Now (2020) | Crash (2022) |

Singles from How I'm Feeling Now
- 1. "Forever" Released: 9 April 2020; 2. "Claws" Released: 23 April 2020; 3. "I Finally Understand" Released: 7 May 2020; 4. "Party 4 U" Released: 13 May 2025

How I'm Feeling Now (stylized in all lowercase) is the fourth studio album by British singer Charli XCX, released on 15 May 2020 by Asylum Records and Atlantic Records. Released eight months after her previous album, Charli (2019), the album was conceived in the span of six weeks during the COVID-19 lockdown in a "do it yourself" collaborative process with her fans. Charli XCX, A. G. Cook and BJ Burton served as the album's executive producers.

How I'm Feeling Now was preceded by the singles "Forever", "Claws", and "I Finally Understand", which were met with positive reviews from critics. The album received critical acclaim and was noted for its fusion of pop songwriting and experimental electronic production. It debuted at number 33 on the UK Albums Chart, moving 2,145 units. It was shortlisted for the 2020 Mercury Prize.

== Background ==
On 13 September 2019, Charli XCX released her third studio album, Charli. To celebrate the one month anniversary of Charli, Charli XCX announced that the album would not receive a deluxe edition and that she already had begun work on a new project. Soon after, on 24 November 2019, Charli XCX announced on Twitter that she was planning to record two new albums in 2020, with plans to release both by 2021. On 18 March 2020, in response to the COVID-19 pandemic, Charli XCX began a self-isolating livestream series featuring artists such as Diplo, Clairo and Rita Ora.

On 3 April 2020, a PDF file containing album details was allegedly leaked on Reddit and LanaBoards. It was initially perceived as a prank, but it gained validity when the file was the first hint of the album title, and Charli XCX and Atlantic Records retweeted the image of the file after it was released by FckyeahCharli on Twitter.

On 6 April 2020, Charli XCX announced through a public Zoom call with fans that she would be working on a new album in self-isolation, with the tentative title How I'm Feeling Now. In the call, Charli XCX stated "The nature of this album is going to be very indicative of the times just because I'm only going to be able to use the tools I have at my fingertips to create all music, artwork, videos everything." The entire project would be collaborative with her fans, using Zoom calls to share demos and text conversations with producers and ask fan input on single releases, song ideas, and artwork. She also said in the stream that A. G. Cook and BJ Burton were among the people she was working with. During the Zoom announcement, Charli XCX set a release date of 15 May 2020.

On 30 April 2020, Charli XCX announced on Twitter the song titles that were currently considered for the track list and that the yet unreleased fan-favorite "Party 4 U" would be on the album as well. The full track list and album cover were revealed on 13 May 2020, prior to the album's release.

== Music and theme ==
Due to the worldwide COVID-19 pandemic, she recorded the entire project inside her house, with the support of her friends and producers online. Lyrically, Charli XCX referred to this album as her "most optimistic project to date," and she has asked fans to submit her beats and assist her with other projects. She also indicated that she would livestream her production process for anyone who wants to watch. On 7 April, Charli XCX stated that the album's tone and much of the lyrics will be about her relationship with her then-boyfriend Huck Kwong. On 13 May, Charli XCX discussed the album on Instagram, expressing the gratitude to the couple of people for inspiration while creating her new work. An electronic pop, experimental pop and hyperpop album, How I'm Feeling Now is a continuation of the signature sound Charli XCX has specialised in since the 2016 release of EP Vroom Vroom, in which she embraced the futuristic pop music of Sophie and other musicians related to the PC Music label, a style that has been variously referred to as "bubblegum bass" and as the previously mentioned "hyper-pop". Kitty Empire of The Guardian described the album's music as "acrylic, outre, influencer club-pop," which "aggressively foregrounds its own artifice." Variety's Jem Aswad characterised the production as "a shape-shifting mesh of shimmering synthesizers, driving bass, hard beats, swarms of voices and crashing mechanical sounds." Although it is characterised as a formal album, critics have noted that How I'm Feeling Now is closer in style to her 2017 mixtapes Number 1 Angel and Pop 2, as it is looser and more experimental than her self-titled album. Charli XCX herself has described the album as "Pop 2's frantic emo younger sister." Writing for Paste, Austin Jones felt: "Though the glitchy sound art and experimental edges of Pop 2 are missed, Charli deftly revives the techniques of the '90s Eurotrance scene that proved formative for her musical development."

== Release and promotion ==
On 10 April, Charli XCX uploaded additional song samples for the album dubbed "Claws", "Enemy", "7 Years", and "Detonate". She then asked through Twitter which of those four songs she should release, and announced that "Claws" won and will be released next week. The song was released on 23 April. On the same day, 10 April, she released a new episode of her radio show The Candy Shop in which she played two new demos, the first being "Breathe Out", and the other being an unnamed demo called "KM TM Demo" with production by Sega Bodega; the song is speculated to be called "Asleep". On 15 April, she uploaded a picture of different music plans, such as writing over a Palmistry beat (working title as "Where U At", ended up being "I Finally Understand"), a Sega Bodega beat, an A. G. Cook one, as well as a Dylan Brady and Nico one. Nömak was also on the list but erased out.

=== Singles ===
On 7 April 2020, Charli XCX shared snippets of a song called "Forever" on social media. On 9 April 2020, she announced that "Forever" would be released as the lead single off the album at 11:30 PM PST and premiere on the BBC Radio 1 with Annie Mac podcast. The official artwork for "Forever" was created by American artist Seth Bogart. Two additional artworks were also released for "Forever", by French artist Regards Coupables and American singer-songwriter Caroline Polachek, respectively. The official music video for "Forever", featuring clips sent in from fans, was released on 17 April 2020. On 11 April 2020, she announced that she had chosen the next single, to be titled either "Claws" or "I Like". On 14 April 2020, she announced that she had settled on "Claws" as the song title. The official music video for "Claws" was remotely directed and edited by Charlotte Rutherford, and featured Charli XCX's then-boyfriend Huck Kwong. It premiered on 1 May 2020. On 2 May 2020, Charli XCX unveiled that she would release a third single before the album release titled "I Finally Understand" the following week. It premiered on 7 May 2020. On the day of the album's release, "Enemy" was released as a promotional single from the album.

In February 2025, "Party 4 U" gained virality on TikTok and became the most streamed song off of the album on Spotify, surpassing "Claws". Following the virality, the song was officially sent to US pop radio through Atlantic Records on 13 May 2025, making it the fourth single from the album. Charli XCX also added the track to the setlist of her 2024–25 Brat Tour, and premiered a music video on 15 May 2025.

=== Tour ===
In August 2021, Charli XCX announced three special shows, branded the How I'm Feeling Now Tour. The singer visited Los Angeles on 27 September 2021, at The Masonic Lodge; New York City on 1 October 2021, at La Poisson Rouge; and her home of London on 24 October 2021, at Lafayette.

== Critical reception ==
Professional ratings
Aggregate scores
| Source | Rating |
|---|---|
| AnyDecentMusic? | 7.9/10 |
| Metacritic | 82/100 |
Review scores
| Source | Rating |
| AllMusic | 4/5 stars |
| Clash | 9/10 |
| Crack | 8/10 |
| The Daily Telegraph | 5/5 stars |
| DIY | 4/5 stars |
| The Guardian | 4/5 stars |
| The Independent | 4/5 stars |
| NME | 4/5 stars |
| Pitchfork | 7.7/10 |
| The Times | 4/5 stars |

How I'm Feeling Now received critical acclaim. At Metacritic, which assigns a normalised rating out of 100 to reviews from professional publications, the album received an average score of 82, based on 16 reviews.

Neil McCormick gave the album a perfect 5-star rating in his review for The Daily Telegraph, opining that it "has a directness, immediacy and intimacy that has eluded her before," while The Fader's Salvatore Maicki called it "indisputably cohesive and honest" in its exploration of emotional extremes. Hannah Mylrea of NME called it a "glorious, experimental collection" and praised Aitchison's "knack for a killer pop hook" despite the "crunching production." Similarly, Clash journalist Megan Warrender commended her "futuristic, unpredictable sound and penchant for an irresistible pop hook" as well as her display of "tenderness and vulnerability." Tom Hull gave the album a B-plus and said that recording at home due to quarantine "doesn't allow her the usual kitchen sink pop production, but she cranks the synths up loud enough it doesn't matter."

Critics have linked the album title's and track listing's all-lowercase stylisation to the collaborative and low-budget conditions that surrounded the album's creation, with Alex Szeptycki of The Arts Fuse noting that the typography contributed to a sense of the album's "DIY homeyness", and Heather Phares of AllMusic writing that the use of lowercase "captures the frozen-in-time yet fleeting feel of quarantine life". Likening Charli XCX's use of lowercase to that of Ariana Grande, Lana Del Rey, and Taylor Swift, Kitty Grady of Vice calls lowercase type a "shorthand for authenticity and vulnerability" on the Internet that allows artists to "connect with and be authentic to their audiences".

The album was shortlisted for the Mercury Prize in 2020, losing to Michael Kiwanuka's Kiwanuka (2019).

=== Rankings ===
Critics' rankings of how i'm feeling now
| Publication | List | Rank | Ref. |
|---|---|---|---|
| Billboard | Billboard's 50 Best Albums of 2020 – Mid-Year | —N/a | |
| Consequence of Sound | Top 50 Albums of 2020 | 18 | |
| Crack | The Top 50 Albums of 2020 | 9 | |
| Exclaim! | 33 Best Albums of 2020 So Far | 22 | |
| Gigwise | The Gigwise 51 Best Albums of 2020 | 30 | |
| Gorilla vs. Bear | Gorilla vs. Bear's Albums of 2020 | 24 | |
| The Guardian | The 50 Best Albums of 2020 | 33 | |
| The Line of Best Fit | The Best Albums of 2020 Ranked | 3 | |
| NME | The 50 Best Albums of 2020 | 24 | |
| NPR | The 50 Best Albums of 2020 | 50 | |
| Paste | Paste's 25 Best Albums of 2020 – Mid-Year | 20 | |
| Pitchfork | The 50 Best Albums of 2020 | 48 | |
| The Quietus | Quietus Albums Of The Year 2020 | 71 | |
| Rolling Stone | Rolling Stone's 50 Best Albums of 2020 – Mid-Year | —N/a | |
| Sputnikmusic | Top 50 Albums of 2020 | 1 | |
| Stereogum | Stereogum's 50 Best Albums of 2020 – Mid-Year | 8 | |
| Stereogum | The 50 Best Albums of 2020 | 19 | |
| Uproxx | The Best Albums of 2020 So Far | 14 | |
| Uproxx | The Best Albums of 2020 | 28 | |

== Track listing ==
How I'm Feeling Now track listing
| No. | Title | Writer(s) | Producer(s) | Length |
|---|---|---|---|---|
| 1. | "Pink Diamond" | Charlotte Aitchison; Dijon Duenas; Alexander Guy Cook | Dijon; A. G. Cook | 2:04 |
| 2. | "Forever" | Aitchison; Cook; BJ Burton | Burton; Cook | 4:03 |
| 3. | "Claws" | Aitchison; Dylan Brady; Burton | Brady | 2:29 |
| 4. | "7 Years" | Aitchison; Cook; Burton | Cook; Burton | 3:15 |
| 5. | "Detonate" | Aitchison; Cook | Cook; Burton^{[a]} | 3:39 |
| 6. | "Enemy" | Aitchison; Burton; James Stack; Eli Teplin | Burton | 3:43 |
| 7. | "I Finally Understand" | Aitchison; Benjamin Keating | Palmistry; Cook^{[a]} | 2:31 |
| 8. | "C2.0" | Aitchison; Jaan Umru Rothenberg; Theron Thomas; Tomas Tammemets; Brady; Cook | Cook | 3:40 |
| 9. | "Party 4 U" | Aitchison; Cook | Cook | 4:56 |
| 10. | "Anthems" | Aitchison; Brady; Danny L Harle; The Angels (Charli's fans) | Brady; Harle; Burton^{[a]} | 2:51 |
| 11. | "Visions" | Aitchison; Cook; Burton | Cook; Burton | 3:49 |
| Total length: | | | | 37:00 |

Notes

- ^{^[a]} indicates an additional producer.
- "C2.0" incorporates lyrics from "Click" and contains vocals from Kim Petras.

== Personnel ==
- Charlotte Aitchison – all vocals, executive production, recording (all tracks), engineering (tracks 1, 2, 4–10)
- A. G. Cook – drum programming (tracks 1, 2, 4, 5, 7–9, 11), synthesisers (tracks 1, 2, 4, 5, 7–9, 11), programming (2), xylophone (2), bass (7), drums (7), additional drum and synthesiser programming (7), background vocals (9), executive production, engineering (9), vocal production (tracks 5, 7, 11)
- Dijon Duenas – drum programming and synthesisers (1)
- BJ Burton – drum programming (tracks 2, 4, 6, 10, 11), synthesisers (tracks 2, 4, 6, 10, 11), Moog (5), bass (6), drums (6), executive production, engineering (tracks 3, 11), vocal production (tracks 1, 3, 5, 6, 11)
- Dylan Brady – bass (3), drum programming (tracks 3, 8), drums (3), synthesisers (3), softsynths (8), harsh noise (8), vocal production (3)
- Eli Teplin – keyboards (6)
- Jim-E Stack – Roland JV-1080 (6)
- Benjamin Keating – background vocals, bass, drum programming, drums, synthesiser, and vocal production (7)
- Kim Petras – additional vocals (8)
- Jaan Umru – bass, drum programming, synth sound design, and vocal processing (8)
- Stuart Hawkes – mastering
- Geoff Swan – mixing
- Niko Battistini – assistant mix engineering

== Charts ==
Chart performance for how i'm feeling now
| Chart (2020) | Peak position |
|---|---|
| Australian Albums (ARIA) | 37 |
| Belgian Albums (Ultratop Flanders) | 106 |
| German Albums (Offizielle Top 100) | 100 |
| Irish Albums (Official Charts) | 27 |
| Japan Download Albums (Billboard Japan) | 82 |
| Lithuanian Albums (AGATA) | 64 |
| New Zealand Albums (RMNZ) | 40 |
| Norwegian Vinyl Albums (VG-lista) | 27 |
| Scottish Albums (Official Charts) | 8 |
| UK Albums (Official Charts) | 33 |
| US Billboard 200 | 85 |

| Chart (2024–2025) | Peak position |
|---|---|
| Croatian International Albums (HDU) | 17 |
| Greek Albums (IFPI) | 33 |
| US Billboard 200 | 85 |

== Release history ==
Release dates and formats for how i'm feeling now
| Region | Date | Format | Label |
|---|---|---|---|
| Various | 15 May 2020 | Digital download; streaming | Atlantic; Asylum |
| Various | 18 September 2020 | LP; CD | Atlantic; Asylum |
| Various | 15 May 2025 | LP (reissue) | Atlantic; Asylum |
