= The Invisible Way =

Studio album by Low
- Released: March 19, 2013
- Length: 41:00
- Label: Sub Pop
- Producer: Jeff Tweedy

Low chronology
C'mon (2011)	The Invisible Way (2013)	Ones and Sixes (2015)

The Invisible Way is the tenth studio album by Low, released in 2013 by Sub Pop. It is produced by Wilco's Jeff Tweedy and recorded at Wilco's studio in Chicago.

== Reception ==
Professional ratings
Aggregate scores
Source	Rating
AnyDecentMusic?	7.5/10
Metacritic	80/100
Review scores
Source	Rating
AllMusic	4/5 stars
The A.V. Club	A−
Chicago Tribune	3.5/4 stars
Entertainment Weekly	B+
The Independent	3/5 stars
Mojo	4/5 stars
The Observer	4/5 stars
Pitchfork	7.3/10
Q	4/5 stars
Spin	7/10

At Metacritic, which assigns a normalized rating out of 100 to reviews from mainstream critics, the album received an average score of 80, based on 36 reviews, which indicates "generally favorable reviews".

In his review for The A.V. Club, critic Jason Heller praised the band's longevity and said that "it's as if Low has taken its tried-and-true songwriting formula—a slow buildup into a smoldering climax—and stretched it to the length of an entire album." Heller called the album "superb." Fred Thomas of AllMusic liked the album's "brilliant production values and carefully curated arrangements" and said that The Invisible Way showed "a band decades into making music but still in a very real state of evolution."

In a less favorable review, Slant Magazine's Jordan Mainzer complained that "not even Sparhawk and Parker's subtle guitar, drum flourishes, and beautifully weary voices can save some of The Invisible Way's worst tracks" and said that the album "makes it clear just how little they've evolved." Another reviewer, Tom Hughes of The Quietus, noted that "at best, Tweedy's soft production complements and highlights the otherworldly splendour of their harmonies; at worst it's predictably concealed, failing to disguise the more inferior songs and lyrical blankness, leaving behind a fairly mixed bag."

== Track listing ==
All tracks are written by Low

No.	Title	Length
1.	"Plastic Cup"	3:00
2.	"Amethyst"	5:20
3.	"So Blue"	4:22
4.	"Holy Ghost"	3:06
5.	"Waiting"	2:38
6.	"Clarence White"	3:48
7.	"Four Score"	2:56
8.	"Just Make It Stop"	4:08
9.	"Mother"	2:52
10.	"On My Own"	5:42
11.	"To Our Knees"	3:08
