= Forever (Charli XCX song) =

2020 single by Charli XCX

- Designed by Regards Coupables

Single by Charli XCX

from the album How I'm Feeling Now
- Released: 9 April 2020
- Recorded: 6–8 April 2020
- Genre: Pop; synth-pop; psychedelic
- Length: 4:03
- Label: Atlantic
- Songwriters: Charlotte Aitchison; Alexander Guy Cook; BJ Burton
- Producers: A. G. Cook; BJ Burton

Charli XCX singles chronology
"Ringtone (remix)" (2020)	"Forever" (2020)	"Claws" (2020)

Audio video
- "Forever" on YouTube

"Forever" (stylised in all lowercase as "forever") is a song recorded by British singer Charli XCX from her fourth studio album, How I'm Feeling Now (2020). Charli XCX wrote the song with its producers A. G. Cook and BJ Burton, and it was released on 9 April 2020, by Atlantic Records as the lead single from the album. "Forever" is a pop, synth-pop, and psychedelic song that features dark wave and electronic influences.

== Background and release ==
On 7 April 2020, Charli XCX shared snippets of "Forever" on social media. On 8 April 2020, Charli XCX uploaded three photos of herself, shot by her then- boyfriend Huck Kwong, to her Instagram and Twitter account and asked fans to vote for one photo to be the cover. On 9 April 2020, Charli XCX announced that "Forever" would be released at 07:30 PM BST / 11:30 AM PST and premiere on BBC Radio 1 as Annie Mac's "Hottest Record in the World". She also announced three official artworks for the single were commissioned. One version was created by American artist Seth Bogart and used on Spotify; one version by French artist Regards Coupables, used on YouTube, Amazon Music and Deezer; and one version by American singer-songwriter Caroline Polachek, used on Apple Music. The official music video for "Forever", featuring clips sent in from fans, was released on 17 April 2020.

== Composition ==
"Forever" was written by Charli XCX and produced by A. G. Cook and BJ Burton. It runs for four minutes and three seconds. Musically, it is a pop, psychedelic, and synth-pop song that features dark wave and electronic influences. The song also features "lo-fi beats and luminous synths" with Charli XCX singing about "an everlasting love that will remain even if the relationship fades away or if they're not physically together".

== Critical reception ==
Trey Alston from MTV News called the song a "robotic ballad" that was about "sheer adoration, to the most mechanical degree", in addition to writing that "if toasters listened to songs when they made love, [this song] would be on their playlist. Alston described the opening of the song as a "harsh opening of boiling synths [transitioning] into a slightly smoother sore throat of a cyborg who's doing its best impression of a lovestruck human". Alston also felt that the sound was a "Terminator-like landscape". Justin Curto from Vulture called the song "muted" and "somewhat dissonant", that "would sound right at home tacked on the end of Charli". Lake Schatz of Consequence of Sound described the song as an "emotional number" that "[wrestles] with intimacy issues — especially during this time of social distancing". Variety’s Jem Aswad felt that the song "bears many of the hallmarks of the prolific artist's work over the past couple of year", including Charli XCX's two mixtapes, Number 1 Angel and Pop 2 (both 2017). Calling the melody "indelible", Aswad mentions Cook’s trademark "echoing synthesizers" and how Charli XCX uses Auto-Tune as an "instrument in itself rather than as pitch correction". Michael Love Michael of Paper, felt that the message of the song was about "reminiscing about the good times with an ex", and while Charli XCX was "singing about the future, the production and overall feel of 'forever' couldn't sound more relevant". James from Stereogum described the song as "perfectly goofy and giddy", "something that sounds ephemeral but feels like it will last forever". James also felt that there was "nothing slapdash" about the track, writing that the lyrics talked about a "part of the compressed reality we’re all experiencing: being trapped in close to someone that you care about" as the single "switches between abrasive and elated", "[choosing] to embrace happiness in the moment". On their year-end list, Pitchfork named "Forever" as one of the best songs of 2020.

== Credits and personnel ==
Credits adapted from Tidal.

- Charli XCX – vocals, songwriting, backing vocals
- A. G. Cook – production, songwriting, drum programming, programming, synthesizer, vocal production, xylophone
- BJ Burton – production, songwriting, drum programming, programming, synthesizer, vocal production
- Geoff Swan – mixing
- Stuart Hawkes – mastering
- Niko Battistini – assistant mix engineer

== Charts ==
Chart (2020)	Peak position
New Zealand Hot Singles (RMNZ)	38

== Release history ==
Region	Date	Format	Label	Ref.
Various	9 April 2020	Digital download; streaming	Atlantic	
Australia	13 April 2020	Contemporary hit radio	Warner	
