= Skinnydipped =

Single by Banks

from the album Serpentina
- Released: August 25, 2021
- Length: 2:56
- Label: AWAL; Her Name Is Banks
- Songwriters: Ben Darwish; Henry Laufer; Jillian Rose Banks
- Producers: Banks; Shlohmo

Banks singles chronology
"The Devil" (2021)	"Skinnydipped" (2021)	"Holding Back" (2022)

Music video
- "Skinnydipped" on YouTube

"Skinnydipped" is a song by American singer-songwriter Banks. It was released on August 25, 2021, as the second single from her fourth studio album, Serpentina (2022). Banks, Henry Laufer and Ben Darwish wrote the song, while Banks and Laufer produced it. The track addresses themes of self-worth and release, with Banks describing it as being about letting go of something repeatedly revisited and embracing personal transformation.

An accompanying music video, co-directed by Banks and Michael Stine, presents women as mythic, siren-like figures in a natural setting, and it emphasizes ideas of sisterhood and empowerment. The video also features pieces from Bulgari's Serpenti collection which visually reinforces the song's themes of rebirth and shedding one's skin.

== Background and theme ==
In June 2021, Banks debuted "The Devil" as the lead single of her then-upcoming fourth studio album, Serpentina (2022). According to her, "Skinnydipped" is "a song about finally letting go of something that you've gone back to many times before", and it concerns "knowing your worth and shedding your skin".

== Music video ==
The music video of "Skinnydipped" was released alongside the single's release; Michael Stine co-directed the video. Banks said it depicts "women as divine creatures, wild in their natural habitat", and described the sirens as "magical, empowered, at peace and connected to one another", emphasizing themes of "sisterhood" and self-acceptance. In an interview with Flood Magazine, she stated: "It represents something powerful, but also dangerous. Like, I don't know if I want to touch it, but I want to because I'm curious."

In the music video, Banks adpoted Bulgari's Serpenti line. Her friend, Lever Couture, designed every dress appearing in the video; Banks described those dresses as "unique", "divine" and "fun". Discussing her collaboration with them, she said the Serpenti line reflects the song's themes, noting that "snakes represent rebirth and shedding one's skin", and that wearing the collection makes a woman feel "dangerously powerful" and "in tune with her natural-born divinity". Papar's Dante Silva wrote that the video feels "similarly subversive", describing that it features "Banks and her close friends embody sirens". On September 7, its lyric video was released through her YouTube.

== Personnel ==
Credits were adapted from Tidal.

- Banks – lead vocal, composer, producer
- Ben Darwish – composer, producer
- Henry Laufer – composer, producer

== Release history ==
List of release dates and formats
Region	Date	Format(s)	Label	Ref.
Various	August 25, 2021	Digital download; streaming	AWAL; Her Name Is Banks	
