= Libraries (album) =

Studio album by The Love Language
- Released: July 13, 2010
- Genre: Rock
- Length: 33:37
- Label: Merge Records

The Love Language chronology
The Love Language (2009)	Libraries (2010)	Ruby Red (2013)

Professional ratings
Aggregate scores
Source	Rating
Metacritic	80/100
Review scores
Source	Rating
Allmusic	4/5 stars
No Ripcord	8/10

Libraries is the second studio album by American musician The Love Language. It was released in July 2010 under Merge Records.

== Track list ==
No.	Title	Length
1.	"Pedals"	4:37
2.	"Brittany's Back"	3:06
3.	"This Blood Is Our Own"	4:07
4.	"Summer Dust"	3:42
5.	"Blue Angel"	4:36
6.	"Heart To Tell"	2:26
7.	"Anthrophobia"	3:05
8.	"Horophones"	2:56
9.	"Wilmont"	3:39
10.	"This Room"	1:23

iTunes Bonus Tracks
No.	Title	Length
11.	"Heart To Tell (Demo)"	2:31
12.	"Summer Dust (Demo)"	3:30
13.	"Days In Love (Demo)"	3:22
14.	"Blue Angel (Demo)"	4:42
15.	"Brittany's Back (Demo)"	3:09
