= Hey What =

Studio album by Low
- Released: September 10, 2021
- Genres: Post-rock; noise rock; experimental rock; experimental pop
- Length: 46:08
- Label: Sub Pop
- Producer: BJ Burton

Low chronology
Double Negative (2018)	Hey What (2021)

Singles from Hey What
- 1. "Days Like These" Released: June 22, 2021; 2. "Disappearing" Released: July 20, 2021; 3. "More" Released: August 18, 2021

Hey What (stylized in all uppercase) is the thirteenth and final studio album by American band Low, released on September 10, 2021 by Sub Pop. It is their third recording produced by BJ Burton, building further on the heavily distorted sound of the band's previous album Double Negative (2018).

Burton and Hey What were nominated in the Best Engineered Album, Non-Classical category at the 64th Annual Grammy Awards. It is the band's only album solely recorded as the core duo of Alan Sparhawk and Mimi Parker, with all prior Low albums being recorded as a trio.

== Composition ==
Hey What, described as "organized chaos", builds its tracks around harmonized vocals from Sparhawk and Parker, often surrounded by "roaring electronic noise", which Pitchfork compares to an "electrical storm in the cavern between two earbuds". The vocals have been described as "a little deeper and rounder at the edges" than on the band's previous records. Pitchfork adds that the sonic decisions the album makes are "shorn of excess and beheld with close attention, conveying feeling beyond words".

Hey What creates a large contrast between its clear, unaffected vocals and its chaotic, distorted instrumentals, interpreted as a "reminder that darkness and light are inseparable". Luke Cartledge of Loud and Quiet felt that while "there are vast swathes of [the] album that are as bleak as one might expect from a band who sounded world-historically miserable before COVID-19 turned everything inside out", the album was instilled with "a little more hope than much of Low's recent work", while not coming across as "happy-clappy"; "it makes no promises about the future, but seems at least to have the temerity to believe that there will be one".

=== Songs ===
The intro song, "White Horses", is characterized by a stuttering pulse, "providing brittle accompaniment for Sparhawk and Parker's harmonizing about the inevitable cruelty of love".

Alexis Petridis of The Guardian thought that while the song "All Night" would constitute the weirdest track on any other album, it feels like "a kind of breather" on Hey What, "before you’re plunged into the increasingly scourging soundworld of Disappearing."

"Days Like These" abruptly transitions between "crystalline", "near-acapella" vocals and relentless noise, crushing the vocals "nearly beyond recognition and drawing up the tension with each hard cut". The song's final three minutes subside into a "wonderfully desolate vista of nudging kick drums, impressionistic vocals and rich, bassy veils of synth", which creates an atmosphere "brilliantly undercut" by the repetition of the word 'again', every other time "sounding more exhausted and smartly inverting the track's platitudinous opening mantra: 'When you think you've seen everything, you'll find we're living in days like these'."

"More", the penultimate track, is built around "flickering noise" and elevated by "Parker's crystal vocals [...] deliver[ing] a lilting melody that could just as easily be layered atop the skeletal atmospherics of their youthful slowcore or the relative accessibility of the almost-conventional-almost-hits" from their preceding discography ("Murderer" and "Monkey").

The closing song, "The Price You Pay (It Must Be Wearing Off)", is the only song on the album to feature drums, the entrance of which being a moment that "suggests a grand release"; however, this moment soon "[...] begins to recede. The clouds gather, the harmonies cycle uneasily; the drums cut out, then back in, then out for good". The ending of the song is marked by repetition of the words "It must be wearing off", which Andy Cush of Pitchfork interpreted as "the promise of salvation at the end of the road flicker[ing] again out of view".

== Release ==
The album was announced on June 22, 2021, accompanied by the release of the single "Days Like These".

== Critical reception ==
Professional ratings
Aggregate scores
Source	Rating
AnyDecentMusic?	8.1/10
Metacritic	84/100
Review scores
Source	Rating
AllMusic	3.5/5 stars
Beats Per Minute	91%
Clash	9/10
Exclaim!	8/10
The Guardian	4/5 stars
Mojo	4/5 stars
Paste	8.6/10
Pitchfork	8.4/10
PopMatters	7/10
Uncut	9/10

Hey What was met with widespread critical acclaim upon its release. At Metacritic, which assigns a normalized rating out of 100 to reviews from professional publications, the album received an average score of 84, based on 22 reviews, indicating "universal acclaim".

Andy Cush, writing for Pitchfork, praised the way the record managed to "harness the unruliness of digital malfunction, make it palatable and even satisfying by tethering it to familiar" instruments like kick-drum. Cush highlighted the album's production to the positively crude output of the old-school electronic, pop, and hip-hop acts, which "have long since abandoned any fealty to the way sounds are supposed to behave in real-world acoustic environments". Additionally, Cush interpreted the album's continuous structure "without a goal in mind" and absence of a satisfying resolution, as a "recognition of deep and complicated truth in the old adage that the journey is more important than the destination".

Luke Cartledge of Loud and Quiet summed it up as a "richly imperfect LP". He considered the "most affecting moments" on Hey What appearing on the track where "structures suddenly collapse in on themselves", however, felt "looser" than their previous discography, "occasionally lacking a certain bite". The tense chain between "lyric and melody, timbre and dynamic, minute detail and overall narrative" narrowly holds intact, but "shaky", perhaps intentionally embodying the "trembling balances of social forces that seem more fragile than ever, and the tiny personal details that make it all more or less bearable day-to-day".

Several critics consider Hey What to be an improvement upon the stylistic choices of the band's previous record, Double Negative. In comparison, the new output sounds more mature, confident, refined, and "melodically driven". Furthermore, it "deepens Double Negative's exploration of sustained ambience, with long stretches devoted to the repetition of a single word, or the slow decay of a keyboard line". On a technical level, the later album advances "the timbral innovations that made Double Negative such a revelation".

== Legacy ==
Following Mimi Parker's death in 2022, Hey What, Low's de facto last album, has been called "a tribute to Mimi Parker— and a masterpiece at the end of the line".

=== Accolades ===
Hey What on year-end lists
Publication	List	Rank	Ref.
The Guardian	The 50 Best Albums of 2021	31	
Les Inrockuptibles	Adrien Durand's Top 10 Albums of 2021	1	
Les Inrockuptibles	Arnaud Ducome's Top 10 Albums of 2021	1	
Les Inrockuptibles	Rémi Boiteux's Top 10 Albums of 2021	10	
Les Inrockuptibles	Valentin Gény's Top 10 Albums of 2021	3	
NPR	NPR Music's 50 Best Albums of 2021	21	
Paste	The 50 Best Albums of 2021	12	
Pitchfork	The 50 Best Albums of 2021	5	
Pitchfork	The 31 Best Rock Albums of 2021	—N/a	

== Track listing ==
All tracks are written by Low.

Hey What track listing
No.	Title	Length
1.	"White Horses"	5:03
2.	"I Can Wait"	4:02
3.	"All Night"	5:14
4.	"Disappearing"	3:32
5.	"Hey"	7:41
6.	"Days Like These"	5:20
7.	"There's a Comma After Still"	1:51
8.	"Don't Walk Away"	4:07
9.	"More"	2:10
10.	"The Price You Pay (It Must Be Wearing Off)"	7:08
Total length:		46:08

== Personnel ==
Low

- Mimi Parker – vocals, percussion
- Alan Sparhawk – guitar, vocals

Technical

- BJ Burton – production, recording, mixing
- Huntley Miller – mastering

== Charts ==
Chart performance for Hey What
Chart (2021)	Peak position
Austrian Albums (Ö3 Austria)	75
Belgian Albums (Ultratop Flanders)	11
Belgian Albums (Ultratop Wallonia)	60
Dutch Albums (Album Top 100)	27
German Albums (Offizielle Top 100)	32
Irish Albums (Official Charts)	44
Italian Albums (FIMI)	89
Portuguese Albums (AFP)	41
Scottish Albums (Official Charts)	10
Swiss Albums (Schweizer Hitparade)	37
UK Albums (Official Charts)	23
UK Independent Albums (Official Charts)	7
