= Ruby Red (The Love Language album) =

Studio album by The Love Language
- Released: July 23, 2013
- Genre: Indie rock
- Length: 33:20
- Label: Merge

The Love Language chronology
Libraries (2010)	Ruby Red (2013)	Baby Grand (2018)

Singles from Ruby Red
- 1. "Calm Down" Released: May 9, 2013

Professional ratings
Aggregate scores
Source	Rating
Metacritic	69/100
Review scores
Source	Rating
AllMusic	3.5/5 stars
Consequence of Sound	3/5 stars
Crackle Feedback	7.5/10 stars

Ruby Red is the third studio album from American musician The Love Language. It was released in July 2013 by Merge Records.

== Track listing ==
No.	Title	Length
1.	"Calm Down"	4:34
2.	"Kids"	2:13
3.	"Hi Life"	3:51
4.	"First Shot"	3:18
5.	"Golden Age"	3:52
6.	"For Izzy"	3:21
7.	"Faithbreaker"	2:12
8.	"On Our Heels"	3:04
9.	"Knots"	2:56
10.	"Pilot Lights"	3:59
