= Tālā (musician) =

British musician

TĀLĀ
- Born: London, United Kingdom
- Occupations: Musician; singer; songwriter; record producer
- Years active: 2014–present
- Musical career
- Genres: Electronic; pop; hip hop
- Labels: Aesop; Columbia
- Website: talatalatala.com

Tālā (stylized as TĀLĀ) is a musician from Kingston upon Thames. She attended a catholic school in Twickenham until she was 16, when she attended the BRIT School. She started learning to play music with piano lessons, jamming with her sitar- and tabla-playing father. She started making electronic music after being given the Reason music software as a teenager. Her stage name is Persian for gold.

She is heavily influenced by modern pop and electronic music. Her debut performance was as a support vocalist for T.Williams on a track called "On My Own" in 2013. TĀLĀ released two records in 2014: her first extended play, The Duchess, and a single through the independent Aesop label. She was then signed up to Columbia Records and released a further EP, Alchemy, in November 2014.

The video for the track "Serbia" was produced with Katia Danfield. Filmed in Morocco, the video was filmed on a shoestring budget and features the girls' sight-seeing.

== Discography ==
=== Extended plays ===
- The Duchess (2014)
- Alchemy (2014)
- Malika (2015)
- Zāl (2016)

=== Singles ===
- "Wolfpack" (w/ Banks) (2015)
- "Talk 2 Me" (2016)
- "Stay Here in the Sun" (ft. Naughty Boy) (2018)
- "Bedtime" (2018)
- "On Top" (2018)
- "Birthday Cake" (2018)
- "Cabin Fever" (2021)

=== Producer ===
- "Misunderstood" – BANKS (2022)
- "Meteorite" – BANKS (2022)
- "Fuck Love" – BANKS (2022)
- "Holding Back" – BANKS (2022)
- "Burn" – BANKS (2022)
- "Spirit" – BANKS (2022)
- "Anything 4 U" – BANKS (2022)

=== Executive producer ===
- "Serpentina" – BANKS (2022)

=== Remixes ===
- "Rise" (TĀLĀ Remix) – Katy Perry (2016)
- "Blame Fire" (TĀLĀ Remix) – Petite Noir (2019)
- "ALL IN" (TĀLĀ Remix) – Lunakai (2021)
- "Better Days" (TĀLĀ Remix) – Dermot Kennedy (2021)

=== Features ===
- "What You Saying?" – Jarreau Vandal (2018)
