= Sway discography =

Sway DaSafo discography
- Studio albums: 5
- Extended plays: 1
- Singles: 10

The discography of a British musician of Ghanaian descent, Sway consists of five studio albums and ten singles.

== Albums ==
=== Studio albums ===
| Title | Details | Chart positions |
| Title | Details | UK |
|---|---|---|
| This Is My Demo | Released: 5 February 2006; Label: Dcypha Productions; Formats: CD, digital download | 45 |
| The Signature LP | Released: 5 October 2008; Label: Dcypha Productions; Formats: CD, digital download | 51 |
| The Deliverance | Released: 24 July 2015; Label: Dcypha Productions; Formats: CD, digital download | 150 |
| Verses from the Vault | Released: 26 January 2018; Label: Dcypha Productions; Formats: CD, digital download | - |
| Verses from the Vault 2 | Released: 26 January 2018; Label: Dcypha Productions; Formats: CD, digital download | - |
"—" denotes album that did not chart or was not released.

=== Extended plays ===
| Title | Details |
|---|---|
| Wake Up | Released: 20 October 2013; Label: 3Beat; Formats: Digital download |
| Songs from the Stash | Released: 1 November 2019; Label: New Reign Productions Limited; Formats: Digital download |

=== Mixtapes ===
- This Is My Promo Vol. 1 (2004, DCypha)
- This Is My Promo Vol. 2 (DCypha)
- This Is My Rave (2006)
- The Dotted Lines Mixtape (2007, DCypha)
- One for the Journey (2007)
- The Signature LP Mixtape (2008, DCypha)
- The Delivery Mixtape (2010, DCypha)
- The Delivery Mixtape 2 - Lost in Transit (2010, DCypha)
- Bring Me to Africa (2010, DCypha)

=== With the group One ===
- Onederful World (2002, self-released) – DJ Amaes

== Singles ==
=== As lead artist ===
| Year | Single | Peak chart positions | Album |
| Year | Single | UK | Album |
|---|---|---|---|
| 2005 | "Up Your Speed" (featuring Pyrelli) | 141 | This Is My Demo |
| 2006 | "Little Derek" (featuring Baby Blue) | 38 | This Is My Demo |
| 2006 | "Products" (featuring El-Rae) | 93 | This Is My Demo |
| 2008 | "Saturday Night Hustle" (featuring Lemar) | 67 | The Signature LP |
| 2009 | "Silver & Gold" (featuring Akon) | 61 | The Signature LP |
| 2009 | "Mercedes Benz" | 53 | The Delivery Mixtape |
| 2011 | "Still Speedin'" | 19 | Non-album singles |
| 2012 | "Level Up" | 8 | Non-album singles |
| 2012 | "Charge" (featuring Mr Hudson) | — | Non-album singles |
| 2013 | "No Sleep" (featuring KSI and Tiggs Da Author) | 44 | Wake Up |
| 2015 | "Snap Shot" (featuring Sam Garrett) | — | The Deliverance |
"—" denotes single that did not chart or was not released.

=== Promotional singles ===
| Year | Single | Album |
|---|---|---|
| 2005 | "Download" | This Is My Demo |
| 2008 | "F UR X" (Feat. Stu$h) | The Signature LP |
| 2010 | "Everyday Valentine" | TBA |
| 2010 | "Pop a Bottle" (Feat. Donae'o) | TBA |

== Guest appearances ==
| Year | Title | Album | Artist |
|---|---|---|---|
| 2004 | Cowboys & Indians feat. Sharkey Major & Bigz | Cowboy Film | Taz |
| 2005 | Harvey Nicks | A Breath Of Fresh Attire | The Mitchell Brothers |
| 2005 | Still On My Own | Set The Tone | Nate James |
| 2005 | Whoopsie Daisy (Copenhaniacs Remix) | Whoopsie Daisy | Terri Walker |
| 2006 | Chatterbox | The Amazing Adventures Of DJ Yoda | DJ Yoda |
| 2006 | Ridin' (UK Remix) | Ridin' | Chamillionaire |
| 2007 | Camera Tricks feat. Bridgette Amofah | This Was Supposed To Be The Future | The Nextmen |
| 2007 | Sorry feat. Baby Blue | Sorry | Madness |
| 2007 | Get Em High | Annie Nightingale Presents Y4K | Stanton Warriors |
| 2007 | March feat. Kyza | Satisfied | Verb T & The Last Skeptik |
| 2007 | Gimme Some | Powerful Music Volume 3 | Sincere |
| 2008 | The Story Has Just Begun | A New Big-Inning | Bigz |
| 2008 | Hey Girl (Remix) feat. Natty Boii | Black Ice | Nia Jai |
| 2008 | I Won't Tell | My Own Way | Jay Sean |
| 2008 | Call My Name | Welcome To Wonderland | Wonder |
| 2008 | Take Me Back (Remix) feat. Taio Cruz & Chipmunk | Take Me Back | Tinchy Stryder |
| 2009 | Feel Like A King | N/A | Bigfoot |
| 2009 | What You Know | Two Fingers | Two Fingers |
| 2009 | Straw Men | Two Fingers | Two Fingers |
| 2009 | Two Fingers | Two Fingers | Two Fingers |
| 2009 | That Girl | Two Fingers | Two Fingers |
| 2009 | Jewels And Gems | Two Fingers | Two Fingers |
| 2009 | High Life | Two Fingers | Two Fingers |
| 2009 | Not Perfect | Two Fingers | Two Fingers |
| 2009 | Shifty feat. Plan B | Shifty | Riz MC |
| 2009 | It's A Crime | Flying High | Ali Campbell |
| 2009 | Bad Girl | Bad Girl | Two Fingers |
| 2009 | Home Sweet Home | Flight Of The Navigator | Bigz |
| 2010 | Hurting | Nightlife | Karl Wolf |
| 2010 | Ride With Me feat. Michael Essien & Asamoah Gyan | Ride Wit Me | Sagaboy |
| 2010 | Red Handed | Red Handed | Dzham |
| 2010 | The Way We Go | The Way We Go | Jukey |
| 2010 | Julia (Lake Of Stars Remix) feat. Mo Laudi, Lucius Banda & Tay Grin | The Very Best Remixes Of The Very Best | The Very Best |
| 2010 | I'm Fly | I'm Fly | Donae'o |
| 2010 | Mashup The Party | Fully Grown | Frisco |
| 2010 | Yours And My Children (Remix) feat. Black the Ripper & Lowkey | Yours And My Children | Akala |
| 2010 | Back To Biznizz feat. Nicole Jackson | Messy | K*Ners |
| 2011 | Nightmares feat. Wretch 32 | No. 5 Collaborations Project | Ed Sheeran |
| 2011 | Break The Chain feat. Eric Turner | Lasers | Lupe Fiasco |
| 2011 | We Are Africans (Funky Remix) | African Dream | JJC |
| 2011 | I Just Wanna Rock You | They Are Among Us | Mason |
| 2011 | He Said She Said | Green Green Grasses | Kobi Onyame |
| 2011 | Amnesia | Amnesia | DarrenBailie |
| 2011 | Weather Man (Remix) feat. Skwilla & Pyrelli | Shooting Star 4 | Tempman |
| 2011 | Shopaholic feat. McLean | Shopaholic | Wideboys |
| 2011 | This Is The Life | This Is The Life | Jamie King |
| 2011 | Ride With Me feat. Lukie D | Super C Season | Naeto C |
| 2011 | Winchi Winchi feat. Wande Coal & Dotstar | Something About You | Dr SID |
| 2012 | Suuliya | Solid Ground | Asem |
| 2012 | In Your Head (TJM Remix) feat. Ice Prince | In Your Head | Mohombi |
| 2012 | Light Me Up | Light Me Up | Lonsdale Boys Club |
| 2012 | Black Dyanamite | SuperTi2bs | Ti2bs |
| 2013 | Alright | TBA | Mark Knight |
| 2013 | Money feat. Jareth | Street Bass Anthems Vol. 6 | Starkey |
| 2013 | The Poison ft Sway & Tigger Da Author | You Guess It Too | Mikill Pane |
| 2014 | Sweet Sixteen ft Sway | Shtick Heads | The Midnight Beast |

=== Soundtracks ===
- 2011: "Beat The World"
