= Dawn Robinson discography =

Dawn Robinson discography discography
- Studio albums: 1
- Singles: 1
- Video albums: 1
- Music videos: 1

American singer Dawn Robinson has released one album, four singles (including three as a featured artist), and one music video, along with various non-single guest appearances.

== Studio albums ==
List of albums, with selected details and chart positions
Title	Album details	Peak chart positions	
Title	Album details	US Heat.	NZ
Dawn	Released: January 29, 2002; Label: Q, LeftSide, Atlantic; Formats: CD	22	50

== Singles ==
=== As lead artist ===
Title	Year	Peak chart positions			Album
Title	Year	US R&B /HH	AUS	NZ	Album
"Envious"	2001	99	66	21	Dawn

=== As featured artist ===
Title	Year	Peak chart positions					Album
Title	Year	US R&B /HH Airplay	NLD	NZ	UK	UK R&B	Album
"Firm Biz" (The Firm featuring Dawn Robinson)	1997	35	53	25	18	4	The Album
"Fly" (The Dre Allen Project featuring Dawn Robinson)	2005	—	—	—	—	—	Live, Yearn, Fulfill & Enlighten
"Get Up" (Mood II Swing featuring Dawn Robinson)	2019	—	—	—	—	—	Deep Rooted (Compiled & Mixed by Mood II Swing)
"—" denotes a recording that did not chart or was not released in that territory.

=== Album appearances ===
Song	Year	Album
"Firm Biz" (The Firm featuring Dawn Robinson)	1997	The Album
"Set It Off" (Dawn Robinson)	2001	FB Entertainment Presents: The Good Life Album
"I'll Decline" (Nate James featuring Dawn Robinson)	2005	Set the Tone
"Get Up" (Mood II Swing featuring Dawn Robinson)	2019	Deep Rooted (Compiled & Mixed by Mood II Swing)

== Soundtrack appearances ==
Song	Year	Album
"This World Is Something New To Me" (Dawn Robinson, Lisa Loeb, B-Real, Patti Smith, Lou Rawls, Laurie Anderson, Gordon Gano, Fred Schneider, Kate Pierson, Cindy Wilson, Phife Dawg, Lenny Kravitz, Beck, Jakob Dylan and Iggy Pop)	1998	The Rugrats Movie
"Rock Steady" (Dawn Robinson)	1998	Dr. Dolittle

== See also ==
- En Vogue discography
- Lucy Pearl discography
- List of best-selling girl groups
