= Alright =

Alright, Allright, or All Right may refer to:

== Music ==
=== Albums ===
- Alright! (album), by Bogdan Raczynski, 2007
- Alright, by Jerry Williams, 2011
- All Right, by Himiko Kikuchi, 1982

=== Songs ===
- "Alright" (Cast song), 1995
- "Alright" (Darius Rucker song), 2009
- "Alright" (Jain song), 2018
- "Alright" (Jamiroquai song), 1997
- "Alright" (Janet Jackson song), 1990
- "Alright" (Kendrick Lamar song), 2015
- "Alright" (Kris Kross song), 1993
- "Alright" (Ledisi song), 2007
- "Alright" (Logic song), 2014
- "Alright!!", by Superfly, 2009
- "Alright" (Supergrass song), 1995
- "All Right", by Christopher Cross, 1983
- "All Right" (Faron Young song), 1955
- "Alright", by Alle Farben feat. Kiddo, 2021
- "Alright!", by Ami Suzuki from Connetta, 2007
- "Alright", by Baboon from Something Good Is Going to Happen to You, 2002
- "Alright", by Electric Light Orchestra from Zoom, 2001
- "Alright", by Emily King from East Side Story, 2007
- "Alright", by Five for Fighting from America Town, 2000
- "Alright", by Gracie Abrams from This Is What It Feels Like, 2021
- "Alright", by Guided by Voices from Alien Lanes, 1995
- "Alright", by Gunna from A Gift & a Curse, 2023
- "Alright", by Inna from Party Never Ends, 2013
- "Alright", by Kent Jones, 2016
- "Alright", by Lady Antebellum from Ocean, 2019
- "Alright", by the Lucy Nation from the Austin Powers: The Spy Who Shagged Me soundtrack, 1999
- "Alright", by Mark Knight featuring Sway, 2013
- "Alright", by Pearl Jam from Gigaton, 2020
- "Alright", by Pilot Speed from Caught by the Window, 2003
- "Alright", by Polo G from Hall of Fame 2.0, 2021
- "Alright", by Sam Fender from Seventeen Going Under, 2021
- "Alright", by Sam Fischer from I Love You, Please Don't Hate Me, 2023
- "Alright", by Screaming Jets from Tear of Thought, 1992
- "Alright", by Shiloh from Picture Imperfect, 2009
- "Alright", by Skindred from Roots Rock Riot, 2007
- "Alright", by Status Quo from In Search of the Fourth Chord, 2007
- "Alright", by the Subways from All or Nothing, 2008
- "Alright", by Tadpole from The Buddhafinger, 2000
- "Alright", by Twista from Category F5, 2009
- "I-ight (Alright)", by Doug E. Fresh, 1993
- "All Right", by Daya from Sit Still, Look Pretty, 2016
- "All Right", by Future from Purple Reign, 2016
- "All Right", by the Guess Who from It's Time, 1966
- "All Right", by Ringo Starr from Ringo's Rotogravure, 1976

== Other uses ==
- Allright (automobile) (German: Allreit), a 1908–1913 German automobile
- Allright, a typeface designed by Ludwig & Mayer in 1936
- All Right!, a 1927 poem by Vladimir Mayakovsky
- "All Right", a 2019 poem by UK Poet Laureate Simon Armitage for a suicide prevention campaign

== See also ==
- "Alright, Alright, Alright", a song by Mungo Jerry
- Alright Already (disambiguation)
- Albright (disambiguation)
- Allwright, a surname
- Smith v. Allwright, a 1944 US Supreme Court case about voting rights
