= Allbright =

Allbright may refer to:

- Allbright, Missouri, unincorporated community in Madison County, Missouri, United States
- AllBright Law Offices, law firm based in Shanghai, China
- Heath Allbright, American politician
- Landry Allbright, American actress
- Nat Allbright (1923–2011), American sports announcer
- Ron Allbright (1934–2016), Canadian footballer

== See also ==
- Albright (disambiguation)
