= Set the Tone =

Set The Tone may also refer to:

- Set the Tone (Nate James album), 2005
- Set the Tone (Ghostface Killah album), 2024
- Set the Tone (band), a Scottish electronic dance band 1982–1983
- "Set the Tone", track on 1993 album Pieces of Woo: The Other Side by Bernie Worrell
