= Goddess (Banks album) =

2014 studio album by Banks

Studio album by Banks
- Released: September 5, 2014
- Studios: Lion Aboard (London) (Note: Engineering on tracks 1 and 3); Young Turks (London) (Note: Tracks 2 and 7; engineering on track 5); Mixed Management (Los Angeles) (Note: Track 4); Werewolf Heart (Los Angeles) (Note: Tracks 10–12; engineering on tracks 6 and 14); One Yard (London) (Note: Track 8); Sorona (Los Angeles) (Note: Track 9); Golden Touch (Los Angeles) (Note: Tracks 13, 16 and 17); Capitol (Los Angeles) (Note: Track 15); TEED (London) (Note: Track 18)
- Genres: Electronica; R&B
- Length: 59:37
- Label: Harvest
- Producers: Tim Anderson; Lil Silva; Justin Parker; Jesse Rogg; Shlohmo; Al Shux; Sohn; Totally Enormous Extinct Dinosaurs; Jamie Woon

Banks chronology
London (2013)	Goddess (2014)	The Altar (2016)

Singles from Goddess
- 1. "Warm Water" Released: May 27, 2013; 2. "Brain" Released: January 29, 2014; 3. "Drowning" Released: June 9, 2014; 4. "Beggin for Thread" Released: July 22, 2014

Goddess is the debut studio album by American singer and songwriter Banks, released on September 5, 2014, by Harvest Records. The album includes songs from her previous extended plays Fall Over and London. The album spawned four singles: "Warm Water", "Brain", "Drowning", and "Beggin for Thread". A companion remix album, Goddess Remixes, was released digitally on March 23, 2015. To mark the album's tenth anniversary, Goddess: Unplugged featuring acoustic versions of 10 tracks from the standard album was released on December 13, 2024.

== Background ==
In February 2014, Banks mentioned that her then-untitled debut studio album was nearing completion; she commented, "I feel like I still have a few more things to let out so that I'll feel really comfortable and happy with my first album being released." In April, Banks announced that the album would be titled Goddess, and confirmed that it would be released on September 9, 2014 in the United States.

== Singles ==
"Warm Water" was released as the lead single from Goddess on May 27, 2013. "Brain" was released as the second single from the album on January 29, 2014. The album's third single, "Drowning", was released on June 9, 2014, peaking at number 48 on the US Rock Digital Songs chart. On July 22, 2014, "Beggin for Thread" was released as the fourth and final single from the album. The song reached number 11 on the US Alternative Songs chart, reached number 64 in Germany, and number 80 in Australia.

=== Other songs ===
"Change" and "Alibi" were released as promotional singles from the album in the United Kingdom on February 9 and September 8, 2014, respectively. "Waiting Game" reached number 16 on the Alternative Digital Songs chart and number 31 on the Pop Digital Songs chart in the United States, while peaking at number 99 on the UK Singles Chart.

== Tour ==
Before announcing Goddess, Banks toured with Canadian singer The Weeknd in 2013, for whom she was the opening act. In May 2014, it was announced that she would embark on her first headlining concert tour, which visited North America during May and June.

List of concerts, showing date, city, country, and venue
Date	City	Country	Venue
North America
May 24, 2014	Vancouver	Canada	Venue
May 26, 2014	Portland	United States	Doug Fir Lounge
May 28, 2014	San Francisco	United States	The Independent
June 4, 2014 (Note: The concert of June 4, 2014, at Irving Plaza in New York City is part of the Governors Ball Music Festival.)	New York City	United States	Irving Plaza
June 6, 2014	Washington, D.C.	United States	U Street Music Hall
June 7, 2014	Philadelphia	United States	Underground Arts at the Wolf Building
June 10, 2014	Toronto	Canada	The Hoxton
June 12, 2014	Manchester	United States	This Tent @ Bonnaroo

== Critical reception ==
Professional ratings
Aggregate scores
Source	Rating
AnyDecentMusic?	6.8/10
Metacritic	74/100
Review scores
Source	Rating
AllMusic	3.5/5 stars
Entertainment Weekly	B+
The Guardian	4/5 stars
Mojo	4/5 stars
NME	7/10
The Observer	3/5 stars
Pitchfork	5.0/10
Q	4/5 stars
Rolling Stone	3.5/5 stars
Uncut	7/10

Goddess received generally positive reviews from music critics. At Metacritic, which assigns a normalized rating out of 100 to reviews from mainstream publications, the album received an average score of 74, based on 22 reviews. Miles Raymer of Entertainment Weekly commended Banks for her "sonic ambition and willingness to risk alienating a pop audience with Goddess' gloomy, tweaky beats". Tshepo Mokoena of The Guardian noted that Banks "lays her emotions bare, at times almost embarrassingly so, sounding raw and vengeful when she belts—and a bit like Fiona Apple in the chirr of her upper vocal register", concluding that although the songs "Someone New" and "Under the Table" "sink into nondescript ballad territory", Goddess is otherwise an "accomplished debut". Felicity Martin of Clash expressed that Banks' "Aaliyah-like vocals pour from Goddess, while a gang of bleeding-edge underground producers ... concoct soulful beats to cushion them", adding that "her confessional appeal is not lost ... as ballads such as 'Under The Table' hark back to her humble piano-and-voice origins."

El Hunt of DIY called the album a "bewitching, and surprisingly diverse debut" and stated that "it looks like Jillian Banks more than lives up to the hype." Will Hermes of Rolling Stone found that the album "confirms a beguiling, diaristic voice that echoes avant-pop forebears (Aaliyah, Fiona Apple, Kate Bush) and a taste for gloomy, synth-centric productions." Slant Magazine's Sal Cinquemani viewed Banks' "attempts at balladry" as "generally forgettable", but opined that she "excels ... at fusing her pop sensibility with imposing synth pads and hip-hop beats". The Observer's Kitty Empire described the album as "slow-burning, fidgety, attractively troubled" and wrote that it "offer[s] up a more conventional take on [minimal R&B] than Banks's British counterpart, FKA Twigs." Despite praising songs such as "Brain" and "Beggin for Thread", Rhian Daly of NME felt that the album is "good, but not up to the standard its title suggests." In a mixed review, Andrew Ryce of Pitchfork commented that "there are moments where [Banks] sounds unpretentious and charming", while dismissing her aesthetic as "all trendy misery assisted by equally fashionable producers, without any substance to hold it all up." He continued, "Banks could certainly go places—but Goddess doesn't, and instead seems content to wallow in the same depressive rut for an exhausting 59 minutes."

=== Accolades ===
Slant Magazine placed Goddess at number eight on its list of "The 25 Best Albums of 2014", with Annie Galvin commenting, "The alt-pop landscape in 2014 was crowded with sultry female singers backed by über-hip electronic beatscapes, yet Jillian Banks managed to rise above the fray with her debut." Rolling Stone named it the 17th best R&B album of 2014, and the magazine's Cady Drell wrote, "More than just an Internet sensation with on-the-nose Nineties R&B throwback hooks, L.A. native Jillian Banks can go from gloomy trance cuts one minute to lyrically explicit soul jams the next—all with an impressively modern gothic touch." It was also listed as the 24th best album of the year by The Guardian.

PopMatters ranked the album number 28 on its year-end list and concluded, "[Banks] is no Beyoncé, but her failures are her strength and our gain, and her scars give Goddess a beauty and a feminist wisdom that the platinum features of Beyoncé will never have." Jessica Goodman and Ryan Kristobak of HuffPost included the album on their list of "The 23 Best Albums of 2014", stating, "While exhilarating in bits, as a full listen, [the album is] a little hard to stomach. However, in the comedown, 'Brain' demonstrates what happens when Banks is at her spiciest, and 'You Should Know Where I'm Coming From' removes the ooze for a clear look at just how capable her voice is on its own, giving us hope for a more explorative follow-up."

== Commercial performance ==
Goddess debuted at number 12 on the US Billboard 200, selling 25,000 copies in its first week. By September 2016, it had sold 120,000 copies in the United States. The album debuted at number 20 on the UK Albums Chart with first-week sales of 3,977 copies.

== Track listing ==
No.	Title	Writer(s)	Producer(s)	Length
1.	"Alibi"	Jillian Banks; Chris Taylor	Sohn	3:48
2.	"Goddess"	Banks; TJ Carter	Lil Silva	4:02
3.	"Waiting Game"	Banks; Taylor	Sohn	3:27
4.	"Brain"	Banks; Henry Laufer	Shlohmo	4:42
5.	"This Is What It Feels Like"	Banks; Carter; Jamie Woon	Lil Silva; Woon	5:02
6.	"You Should Know Where I'm Coming From"	Banks; Justin Parker	Totally Enormous Extinct Dinosaurs; Tim Anderson^{[a]}; Parker^{[a]}	3:55
7.	"Stick"	Banks; Carter	Lil Silva	5:13
8.	"Fuck Em Only We Know"	Banks; Orlando Higginbottom	Totally Enormous Extinct Dinosaurs	4:36
9.	"Drowning"	Banks; Al Shuckburgh	Al Shux; Anderson^{[b]}	4:09
10.	"Beggin for Thread"	Banks; Jesse Rogg; Anderson	Rogg; Anderson	4:09
11.	"Change"	Banks; Anderson	Anderson	4:16
12.	"Someone New"	Banks; Anderson; Aron Forbes	Anderson	4:41
13.	"Warm Water"	Banks; Higginbottom	Totally Enormous Extinct Dinosaurs	3:28
14.	"Under the Table"	Banks; Higginbottom	Totally Enormous Extinct Dinosaurs	4:09
Total length:				59:37

Deluxe edition bonus tracks
No.	Title	Writer(s)	Producer(s)	Length
15.	"And I Drove You Crazy"	Banks; Higginbottom	Totally Enormous Extinct Dinosaurs	4:31
16.	"Fall Over"	Banks; Rogg	Rogg	3:29
17.	"Before I Ever Met You"	Banks; Rogg	Rogg	4:27
18.	"Bedroom Wall"	Banks; Higginbottom	Totally Enormous Extinct Dinosaurs	4:17
Total length:				76:21

Japanese edition bonus track
No.	Title	Writer(s)	Producer(s)	Length
19.	"Beggin for Thread" (Bag Raiders remix)	Banks; Rogg; Anderson	Rogg; Anderson; Bag Raiders^{[c]}	3:47
Total length:				80:08

=== Notes ===
- ^{^[a]} signifies a co-producer
- ^{^[b]} signifies an additional producer
- ^{^[c]} signifies a remixer

== Personnel ==
Credits adapted from the liner notes of the deluxe edition of Goddess.

=== Musicians ===
- Banks – vocals
- Edmund Finnis – string arrangements (tracks 6, 14)
- The Section Quartet (tracks 6, 14)
  - Daphne Chen – violin
  - Eric Gorfain – violin
  - Lauren Chipman – viola
  - Richard Dodd – cello
- Justin Parker – piano (track 6)

=== Technical ===
- Sohn – production, mixing (tracks 1, 3)
- Daniel Moyler – engineering (tracks 1, 3)
- Lil Silva – production, mixing (tracks 2, 5, 7); recording (tracks 2, 7); engineering (track 5)
- Shlohmo – production (track 4)
- Henry Laufer – recording (track 4)
- Cassian – mixing, mastering (track 4)
- Jamie Woon – production (track 5)
- Totally Enormous Extinct Dinosaurs – production, mixing (tracks 6, 8, 13–15, 18); recording (tracks 8, 13, 15); engineering (track 18)
- Tim Anderson – co-production (track 6); additional production (track 9); production, recording (tracks 10–12); mixing (track 12)
- Justin Parker – co-production (track 6)
- Chris Spilfogel – engineering (tracks 6, 14)
- Al Shux – production, recording, mixing (track 9)
- Jesse Rogg – production (tracks 10, 16, 17); mixing (tracks 10, 11, 16, 17); recording (tracks 16, 17)
- Trevor McFedries – executive production
- Pete Lyman – mastering (tracks 1–3, 5–18)

=== Artwork ===
- Studio Moross – design
- Barnaby Roper – photography

== Charts ==
=== Weekly charts ===
Weekly chart performance for Goddess
Chart (2014)	Peak position
Australian Albums (ARIA)	17
Austrian Albums (Ö3 Austria)	47
Belgian Albums (Ultratop Flanders)	37
Belgian Albums (Ultratop Wallonia)	31
Canadian Albums (Billboard)	8
Danish Albums (Hitlisten)	22
Dutch Albums (Album Top 100)	75
French Albums (SNEP)	70
German Albums (Offizielle Top 100)	18
Irish Albums (IRMA)	23
New Zealand Albums (RMNZ)	18
Polish Albums (ZPAV)	32
Scottish Albums (Official Charts)	34
Swiss Albums (Schweizer Hitparade)	12
UK Albums (Official Charts)	20
UK R&B Albums (Official Charts)	1
US Billboard 200	12
US Independent Albums (Billboard)	4

=== Year-end charts ===
Year-end chart performance for Goddess
Chart (2014)	Position
US Independent Albums (Billboard)	47

== Certifications ==
Certifications for Goddess
Region	Certification	Certified units/sales
United Kingdom (BPI)	Silver	60,000^{‡}
United States (RIAA)	Gold	500,000^{‡}
^{‡} Sales+streaming figures based on certification alone.

== Release history ==
Release dates and formats for Goddess
Region	Date	Format	Edition	Label	Ref(s)
Australia	September 5, 2014	CD; digital download	Standard; deluxe	Harvest	
Germany	September 5, 2014	CD; digital download	Standard; deluxe	Universal	
Germany	September 5, 2014	LP	Standard	Universal	
Ireland	September 5, 2014	CD; digital download	Standard; deluxe	Virgin EMI	
France	September 8, 2014	CD	Standard	Capitol	
France	September 8, 2014	Digital download	Standard; deluxe	Capitol	
United Kingdom	September 8, 2014	CD; digital download	Standard; deluxe	Virgin EMI	
United Kingdom	September 8, 2014	LP	Standard	Virgin EMI	
United States	September 9, 2014	CD; LP	Standard	Harvest	
United States	September 9, 2014	Digital download	Standard; deluxe	Harvest	
United States	September 9, 2014	CD	Deluxe (Target exclusive)	Harvest	
France	October 13, 2014	LP	Standard	Capitol	
Japan	February 4, 2015	CD	Japan standard	Universal	
