= Drowning (Banks song) =

Single by Banks

from the album Goddess
- Released: June 9, 2014
- Genre: Pop
- Length: 4:09
- Label: Harvest
- Songwriters: Jillian Banks; Alexander Shuckburgh
- Producers: Al Shux; Tim Anderson

Banks singles chronology
"Brain" (2014)	"Drowning" (2014)	"Beggin for Thread" (2014)

Music video
- "Drowning" on YouTube

"Drowning" is a song recorded by American singer and songwriter Banks for her debut studio album, Goddess (2014). It was released on June 9, 2014 by Harvest Records as the album's third single. The song was written by Banks and Alexander Shuckburgh, and produced by Tim Anderson and Alexander Shuckburgh.

== Composition ==
During an interview with Noisey, Banks stated that the lyrics of "Drowning" were inspired by her best friend. Chris DeVille from Stereogum described the song as "an angry fist-wave from a woman scorned." Robin Murray from Clash defined the song's production and the singer's vocals as "a sultry, smoky effort from the singer, with BANKS delivering one of her most seductive vocal performances to date."

== Music video ==
The music video for "Drowning" was directed by Mike Piscitelli. It was released on Banks's Vevo channel on June 5, 2014. The video features Banks slinking through a room full of mirrors and lightbulbs. In the video Banks wears the same outfit in signature colors of black, red, and white respectively.

== Charts ==
Chart performance for "Drowning"
Chart (2014)	Peak position
Belgium (Ultratip Bubbling Under Flanders)	35
US Rock Digital Songs (Billboard)	48
