= Beggin for Thread =

Single by Banks

from the album Goddess
- Released: July 22, 2014
- Genre: Pop; electropop
- Length: 4:09
- Label: Harvest
- Songwriters: Jillian Banks; Jesse Rogg; Tim Anderson
- Producers: Jesse Rogg; Tim Anderson

Banks singles chronology
"Drowning" (2014)	"Beggin for Thread" (2014)	"Better" (2015)

Music video
- "Beggin for Thread" on YouTube

"Beggin for Thread" is a song recorded by American singer and songwriter Banks for her debut studio album, Goddess (2014). It was released as the album's fourth single on July 22, 2014, by Harvest Records. The song was written by Banks, Jesse Rogg, and Tim Anderson, and produced by the latter two.

"Beggin for Thread" garnered moderate chart success upon its release. In the United States, it peaked at number 11 on the Billboard Alternative Songs chart. Internationally, it charted in Germany and Australia at numbers 64 and 80, respectively. The song made its live television debut when Banks performed it on ABC's Jimmy Kimmel Live on August 4, 2014.

== Commercial performance ==
In the United States, "Beggin for Thread" debuted at number 33 on the US Alternative Songs chart during the week of September 29, 2014. It later peaked at number 11 on the chart on December 27, 2014. The song continued to enjoy moderate success when it debuted at number 39 on Mediabase's Adult Top 40.

The track was ranked 27th for the Triple J Hottest 100, 2014.

== Music video ==
An accompanying music video for the song was directed by Barnaby Roper and released on July 29, 2014. It depicts Banks in a black and white background setting while being surrounded by male background dancers.

== Live performances ==
On August 7, 2014, Banks made her late-night television debut on ABC's Jimmy Kimmel Live, where she performed the song along with "Waiting Game". On April 3, 2015, she performed "Beggin for Thread" on The Late Show with David Letterman.

== Charts ==
=== Weekly charts ===
Weekly chart performance for "Beggin for Thread"
Chart (2014–2015)	Peak position
Australia (ARIA)	80
Canada Rock (Billboard)	36
Czech Republic Singles Digital (ČNS IFPI)	51
Germany (GfK)	64
US Bubbling Under Hot 100 Singles (Billboard)	16
US Adult Pop Airplay (Billboard)	28
US Alternative Airplay (Billboard)	11
US Dance Club Songs (Billboard)	8
US Rock & Alternative Airplay (Billboard)	14

=== Year-end charts ===
Year-end chart performance for "Beggin for Thread"
Chart (2015)	Position
US Alternative Songs (Billboard)	46

== Certifications ==
Certifications for "Beggin for Thread"
Region	Certification	Certified units/sales
New Zealand (RMNZ)	Gold	15,000^{‡}
United States (RIAA)	Platinum	1,000,000^{‡}
^{‡} Sales+streaming figures based on certification alone.

== Release history ==
Release dates and formats for "Beggin for Thread"
Region	Date	Format	Label	Ref.
Ireland	July 22, 2014	Digital download	Virgin EMI	
United Kingdom	July 22, 2014	Digital download	Virgin EMI	
United States	September 16, 2014	Alternative radio	Harvest	
