= Ti2bs =

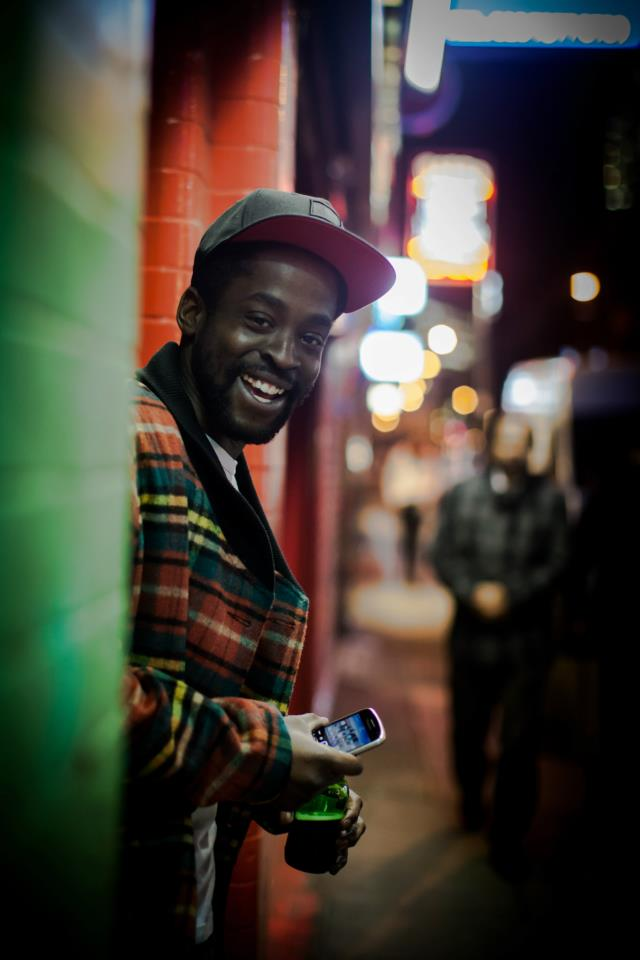

Background information
- Born: Maka Agu; 12 January 1982 (age 44); Tottenham, London, England
- Genres: Hip hop, grime, electro, electronic dance, british hip hop
- Occupations: Rapper, songwriter, composer
- Instrument: Rapping (vocals)
- Years active: 2001–present
- Labels: Kemet, From Da Soul
- Website: ti2bs.com

Maka Agu, (born 12 January 1982), better known by his stage name Ti2bs or Mr Ti2bs, is an English rapper. He released his first mixtape North Stars Rising in 2002; and his first album, Nobody's Perfect, in 2007 on Kemet Entertainment Records.

== Career history ==
=== Early career ===
Ti2bs started his professional career in 2001 as a member of the seminal British Hip Hop group The One Crew with Sway (rapper), Al Shux, Bigz and Pyrelli. The One Crew released their debut album, called Onederful World which was subsequently nominated by the MOBO committee for the "MOBO Unsung" award. This resulted in the group reaching the final five of the competition. They did not win, however, DJ Tim Westwood of BBC Radio 1 and DJ Semtex of BBC Radio 1Xtra began giving them airplay as a result of the exposure.

TI2bs left The One Crew and joined Mud Family alongside Skinnyman, Chester P, Farma G and Sincere. Ti2bs featured on all four tracks on their debut EP – the Mud Family EP – Expressions, In Da Park, My Life and Fuck A Concept

Working with the Mud Family led Skinnyman to ask Ti2bs to appear alongside him and Blade (rapper) on the track Boing, Boing taken from the 2003 RZA album The World According to RZA

=== 2002–present: Going Solo ===
Since leaving The One Crew and Mud Family Ti2bs has enjoyed a successful solo career. He has released eight mixtapes and an album. He has also toured the country extensively with Rodney P.

In June 2013, the instrumental version of his song I'm Over, Over The Top was used in the McDonald's We All Have McDonald's in Common – Parallel Lives television advertising campaign in the United Kingdom.

== Discography ==
=== Mixtapes ===
- 2002 – North Stars Rising
- 2003 – From My Manor To Your Manor
- 2004 – Mixtape Madness
- 2005 – From My Manor To Your Manor Vol. 2
- 2006 – From The Soul (SK Vibemakers)
- 2007 – Keep It Moving (DJ Silk)
- 2009 – Blood Sweat and Tears
- 2013 – SuperTi2bs
- 2013 – The Best Of

=== Album ===
- 2007 – Nobody's Perfect (Kemet)
