= Level Up (Sway song) =

Single by Sway
- Released: 8 April 2012
- Recorded: 2011
- Length: 3:29 (album version); 2:52 (radio edit)
- Label: All Around the World
- Songwriters: Derek Safo; Joshua Steele
- Producer: Flux Pavilion

Sway singles chronology
"Still Speedin'" (2011)	"Level Up" (2012)	"Charge" (2012)

"Level Up'" is a song by English musician Sway, featuring uncredited vocals from the singer Kelsey McHugh. The track was first released in the United Kingdom through All Around the World on 8 April 2012 as the second single from Sway's third studio album, The Deliverance, although it was not ultimately included on the album. Produced by Flux Pavilion, "Level Up" premiered on 8 February 2012 – with BBC Radio 1's Zane Lowe naming it his "Hottest Record in the World".

== Music video ==
A music video to accompany the release of "Level Up" was first released on YouTube on 2 March 2012 at a total length of three minutes and eight seconds.

== Track listing ==
UK digital download
No.	Title	Length
1.	"Level Up" (Radio Edit)	2:52
2.	"Level Up" (Extended Mix)	3:29
3.	"Level Up" (Blame Radio Edit)	3:18
4.	"Level Up" (Blame Mix)	5:03
5.	"Level Up" (Sigma Full Vocal Mix)	4:50
6.	"Level Up" (Fake Blood Mix)	5:11
7.	"Level Up" (Sunship Mix)	4:30
8.	"Level Up" (Cahill Mix)	5:18

International digital download
No.	Title	Length
1.	"Level Up" (DCY & BBK Remix) (featuring JME and KSI)	3:34
2.	"Level Up" (International Remix) (featuring Childish Gambino)	3:05
3.	"Level Up" (Blame Remix) (featuring Lady Leshurr)	4:41
4.	"Level Up" (The Next Room Refix) (featuring Lady Leshurr)	3:09
5.	"Level Up" (Slowjob Mix)	5:12
6.	"Level Up" (Instrumental Edit)	3:28

== Charts ==
=== Weekly charts ===
Chart (2012)	Peak position
Scotland Singles (OCC)	8
UK Hip Hop/R&B (OCC)	3
UK Singles (OCC)	8
UK Official Streaming Chart Top 100	42

=== Year-end charts ===
Chart (2012)	Position
UK Singles (Official Charts Company)	174

== Release history ==
Region	Date	Format	Label
United Kingdom	8 April 2012	Digital download	All Around the World
