= Revival (Vancouver Sleep Clinic album) =

Studio album by Vancouver Sleep Clinic
- Released: 7 April 2017
- Recorded: 2015–16
- Genre: Indie pop; ambient pop
- Length: 46:01
- Label: Sony Music
- Producer: Vancouver Sleep Clinic (exec.); Al Shux (also exec.)

Vancouver Sleep Clinic chronology
Winter EP (2014)	Revival (2017)	Therapy: Phase 001 EP (2018)

Singles from Revival
- 1. "Lung" Released: 24 August 2016; 2. "Killing Me to Love You" Released: 2 September 2016; 3. "Someone to Stay" Released: 4 November 2016; 4. "Unworthy" Released: 13 March 2017

Revival is the debut studio album by Australian band Vancouver Sleep Clinic. It was released on 7 April 2017 through Columbia Records. It features production work primarily from Al Shux, who has previously worked with Banks, Birdy and Shura.

== Critical reception ==
Writing for the fan-based blog Carnesa, Benjamin Solomon states, "The album is a moody record, and the eerie nature of his voice makes for a chilling collection of acoustic pieces perfectly collated to tell a story almost incomprehensible due to his ghostly vocals, but very relatable... [the album] is sorrowfully sombre, yet is a fine anesthetizer to the more up-beat and violent waves rocking the radio today," stating tracks Empire, Wildfire and Revival as album highlights. He also praises Tim Bettinson's vocal performance, noting that it is "transcendent from start to finish, although it particularly is powerful on Someone to Stay."

== Track listing ==
Revival
No.	Title	Writer(s)	Producer(s)	Length
1.	"Whispers"	Tim Bettinson; Alexander Shuckburgh	Al Shux	3:47
2.	"Killing Me to Love You"	Bettinson; Shuckburgh	Al Shux	3:22
3.	"Living Water"	Bettinson; Shuckburgh	Al Shux	5:20
4.	"Empire"	Bettinson; Shuckburgh	Al Shux	4:48
5.	"Someone to Stay"	Bettinson; Shuckburgh	Al Shux	4:14
6.	"Lung"	Bettinson	Al Shux	3:35
7.	"Letting Go"	Bettinson; Shuckburgh	Al Shux	4:04
8.	"Sleeping World"	Bettinson; Shuckburgh	Al Shux	4:18
9.	"Wildfire"	Bettinson; Shuckburgh	Al Shux	4:01
10.	"Unworthy"	Bettinson; Shuckburgh	Al Shux	4:30
11.	"Revival"	Bettinson; Shuckburgh	Al Shux	4:02
Total length:				46:01
