= Silver & Gold (song) =

Single by Sway DaSafo featuring Akon

from the album The Signature LP
- Released: 15 February 2009
- Recorded: 2008
- Genre: Hip-Hop/Rap
- Length: 4:12
- Label: Dcypha Productions

Sway DaSafo singles chronology
"Saturday Night Hustle" (2008)	"Silver & Gold" (2009)	"Mercedes Benz" (2009)

Akon singles chronology
"Stuck with Each Other" (2009)	"Silver & Gold" (2009)	"One" (2009)

"Silver & Gold'" is a single released by Ghanaian British musician Sway from his second studio album The Signature LP. It features vocals from Akon. The single was released on 15 February 2009; it peaked at number 61 on the UK Singles Chart.

== Track listing ==
UK Digital download

1. "Silver & Gold" - 4:12
2. "Silver & Gold" (Mr Katsav Club Remix) - 6:16
3. "Silver & Gold" (Future Freakz Club Mix) - 6:47
4. "Silver & Gold" (Radio Edit) - 3:24
5. "Silver & Gold" (Mr Katsav Radio Edit) - 3:18
6. "Silver & Gold" (Future Freakz Radio Edit) - 3:31
7. "Silver & Gold" (Future Freakz Dub Mix) - 6:45
8. "Silver & Gold" (Instrumental) - 4:11
9. "Silver & Gold" (Music video) - 4:10

== Chart performance ==
Chart (2009)	Peak position
UK Singles (Official Charts Company)	61

== Release history ==
Region	Date	Format	Label
United Kingdom	15 February 2009	Digital Download	Dcypha Productions
