= The World According to RZA =

Compilation album by RZA
- Released: April 28, 2003
- Recorded: 2000–2002
- Genre: East Coast hip hop; political hip hop
- Length: 73:35
- Label: Virgin/EMI 7243 5 84254 2 0 V2-84254
- Producer: RZA

RZA chronology
Digital Bullet (2001)	The World According to RZA (2003)	Kill Bill Volume 1 (soundtrack) (2003)

Professional ratings
Review scores
Source	Rating
RapReviews	6.5/10 stars

The World According to RZA is a compilation album featuring the production of Wu-Tang Clan member RZA that features his tracks for emcees from a variety of European countries. The album was never released in the United States.

== Recording ==
In an interview with Skruff.com, RZA spoke about the process of recording The World According to RZA.

We flew to seven or eight countries, which involved a lot of planes, trains, and automobiles. I stayed in lots of studios to record this album. It was almost like a tour, but it was a really good experience. I actually recorded the whole record in 36 days. My album was originally called War because I'm having a war to break down these barriers people put up against each other. How can you have borders between four countries within a hundred miles, where people are separate and will try to kill each other if you cross this line? All it is about is a small bunch of men in each of these places controlling the masses of the people. It's like big gangbanging. For real, I don't really approve of it because we're all the human family. It's been told by many great prophets throughout history and many great civil-rights teachers, people like Gandhi. Even if you look at people like Stalin or Hitler, who were terrible in history, their idea was to unify the people as one. Unity is the key. The euro is an example of people trying to unify, but they're only trying to unify through the dollar and not through the heart, and that's another problem. We're knocking down all barriers, and there's no separation in hip hop. We're not going to say there's West Coast or East Coast hip hop, American hip hop or European hip hop—it's got to be the movement of our generation, one hip hop. I like to say this quote: "Hip hop: the sound and soul of our generation." That's my favorite quote.

== Track listing ==
1. RZA - "Intro" 2:14
2. Feven - "Mesmerize" 3:54
3. Petter - "Det e så jag känner" 3:06
4. RZA feat. Diaz, Petter & Feven (Scandinavian Allstars) - "On tha Ground" 4:05
5. RZA feat. Diaz - "The North Sea" 3:39
6. RZA - "Saïan Intro" 0:54
7. RZA featuring Ghostface Killah & Saïan Supa Crew - "Saïan" 4:10
8. Bams feat. U-God - "Please, Tends l'Oreille" 3:58
9. Nap - "Warning" 5:04
10. Passi feat. RCFA - "Dedicace" 4:47
11. RZA feat. IAM - "Seul Face à Lui" 4:14
12. Xavier Naidoo feat. Deborah Cox - "Souls on Fire" 4:47
13. Curse - "Ich Weiss (On My Mind)" 2:51
14. Afrob & Sekou - "Black Star Line-Up" 4:12
15. RZA feat. Xavier Naidoo - "I've Never Seen ..." 5:13
16. RZA feat. Blade, Skinnyman & Ti2bs - "Boing, Boing" 4:48
17. Bronz'n'blak - "Make Money, Money" 3:55
18. Frankie Hi-NRG MC - "Passaporto per Resistere" 3:02
19. Fuat Ergin, Bektas & Germ - "Uzaktan Gelen Ses" 4:21

The New Version contains the German song "Hotel" by Kool Savas feat. Eko Fresh & Valezka instead of "Warning" by Nap and "I've Never Seen..." is replaced with the German version of it titled "Ich Kenne Nichts (Das So Schön Ist Wie Du)". RZA's verse is not included on this track. The original version of the album is out of print and very hard to find.
