= Saturday Night Hustle =

Single by Sway DaSafo featuring Lemar

from the album The Signature LP
- B-side: "F Ur X (featuring Stush)"
- Released: 15 September 2008
- Recorded: 2008
- Genre: British hip-hop; R&B
- Length: 3:18
- Label: Dcypha
- Songwriter: Sway DaSafo
- Producer: Al Shux

Sway DaSafo singles chronology
"Little Derek" (2006)	"Saturday Night Hustle" (2008)	"Silver & Gold" (2008)

"Saturday Night Hustle" is the second single released from British rapper Sway Dasafo's second album The Signature LP. It features R&B singer Lemar. Released on 15 September 2008, the song was produced by Al Shux, who has worked with Sway before. It spent one week on the UK Singles Chart, peaking at number 67.

According to the DVD release of The Signature LP, "Saturday Night Hustle" was written during the production of Sway's debut album This Is My Demo, but was omitted from the album's track list as he believed it was not appropriate for the album.

"Saturday Night Hustle" is a sample of "Saturday Love", the 1985 single by American R&B singers Cherrelle and Alexander O'Neal. The days of the week, from Sunday to Saturday, is repeated in the chorus of both tracks.

== Track listing ==
1. "Saturday Night Hustle (Album Version)" - 3:24
2. "Saturday Night Hustle (Jukey Club Remix)" - 6:09
3. "Saturday Night Hustle (instrumental)" - 3:23
