= Vancouver Sleep Clinic =

Australian musical project

- Born: Tim Bettinson; 28 April 1996 (age 30)
- Origin: Brisbane, Australia
- Genres: Electronic rock; pop rock; indie pop; indie folk; shoegaze; R&B
- Years active: 2013–present
- Labels: Sony; ondependent
- Website: vancouversleepclinic.org

Vancouver Sleep Clinic is an Australian musical project created by the singer, songwriter, and record producer Tim Bettinson.

== Career ==
Tim Bettinson was a finalist in Triple J's Unearthed High competition in 2013. As Vancouver Sleep Clinic, he released his debut EP, Collapse, later the same year. The project's first full-length album, 2017's Revival, was co-produced by the Grammy Award-winning British songwriter Al Shux. Vancouver Sleep Clinic has since released the albums Onwards to Zion (2019), Fallen Paradise (2022), and Valley of My Prime (2026), as well as a number of EPs.

Bettinson has collaborated with a range of artists, including Seven Lions, Zhu, Madeon, Raury, Wafia, Gnash, Said the Sky, Drew Love, and Daniel Johns.

The project's music has been included in film (Aloha) and advertising campaigns (Pacífico).

== Discography ==
=== Studio albums ===
- Revival (2017)
- Onwards to Zion (2019)
- Fallen Paradise (2022)
- Valley of My Prime (2026)

=== EPs ===
- Winter (2014)
- Therapy Phase 01 (2018)
- Therapy Phase 02 (2018)
- From a Distant Dream... (2021)

=== Other albums ===
- Pop Goes Ambient Vol. 1 feat. Amelia Magdalena (2023)

=== Singles ===
- "Vapour" (2013)
- "Collapse" (2013)
- "Hold on We're Going Home" (Drake cover) (2014) (with GXVXNS)
- "Flaws" (2014)
- "Lung" (2016)
- "Killing Me to Love You" (2016)
- "Someone to Stay" (2017)
- "Unworthy" (2017)
- "Closure" (2018) (featuring Drew Love)
- "Ayahuasca" (2018)
- "Vixen" (2018) (featuring Raury)
- "In the End" (2018)
- "Silver Lining" (2018)
- "Don't Matter to Me" (Drake cover) (2018) (with GXVXNS)
- "Mercy" (2018)
- "Bad Dream" (2019)
- "Summer '09" (2019)
- "Fever" (2019)
- "Middle of Nowhere" (2020)
- "The Wire" (2021)
- "Love You Like I Do" (2022)
- "The Flow" (2022)
- "Blood Money" (2022)

=== Guest appearances ===
- "Superfly" (2014) (with Raury)
- "Modern Conversation" (2015) (with ZHU & Daniel Johns)
- "Only Way Out" (2015) (with Madeon)
- "Fading Through" (2015) (with Wafia)
- "Stargazing" (2017) (with Gnash)
- "Change Your Mind" (2018) (with Said the Sky)
- "Moon" (2020) (with OTR)
- "Call on Me" (2022) (with Seven Lions)
- "Running in a Dream" (2024) (with Nils Hoffmann)
- "Things I Wish I Could Forget" (2025) (with Chet Porter)
- "Me and You" (2025) (with Forester)
