= Guy Katsav =

British record producer, mix engineer and remixer

- Birth name: Guy Katsav
- Born: April 1980
- Origin: London, United Kingdom
- Genres: Electronic, pop, urban
- Occupation(s): Record producer, mixing engineer, remixer

Guy Katsav (born April 1980) is a British record producer, mixing engineer and remixer based in London.

== Biography ==
His selected credits include mixing a no. 1 album by The View and a Mercury award nominated album of 2011 Brit award winner - Laura Marling. He has engineered for David Guetta, Groove Armada, The Streets, Gossip, Akon, Noah and The Whale, Moby, Orchestral Manoeuvres in the Dark, Killa Kela, Bonobo, Kano, De La soul, Mr. Hudson and Lisa Marie Presley, among many others. Katsav worked at Soho Recording Studios for nine years and, in 2013, launched his own Denmark Street Studios in Denmark Street. Recently he has produced for Gangsta-Nerd duo Tigermonkey, Do The Mobot for Mo Farah, Gypsy Hill and Sway.
