= Envious (song) =

Single by Dawn Robinson

from the album Dawn
- Released: November 20, 2001
- Recorded: 2001
- Genre: R&B; hip hop
- Length: 3:48
- Label: Atlantic
- Songwriters: Kowan "Q" Paul; Dawn Robinson; Milton Davis; Amber Jade Young
- Producer: Kowan Paul

Dawn Robinson singles chronology
"You" (2001)	"Envious" (2001)	"Fly" (2005)

"Envious" is the debut solo single by R&B singer-songwriter Dawn Robinson (all of Robinson’s past singles had been recorded and released during her membership in En Vogue and Lucy Pearl). The song was written by Robinson, Kowan "Q" Paul, Milton Davis, and Amber Jade Young, produced by Kowan Paul. The song was composed for Robinson's debut solo album, Dawn. Atlantic Records released "Envious" on November 20, 2001, as the album's lead single.

== Music video ==
The music video opens with Robinson in a dark area with a small crowd of people around her she sings the first verse to them. As the hook starts, the lights come on and it shows thousands of people around Robinson. The people stand and join hands to make a tunnel which Robinson crawls through as she sings the second verse. She is then seen wearing a red dress and crawling up a huge wall of men, she then spray-paints a heart on one of the men's chest. Robinson then falls from the wall and is caught by the crowd below and her clothes suddenly change to a black jacket, midriff shirt and leather pants. Robinson and the crowd then dance until the song fades out. The video was filmed in 2001.

== Charts ==
Chart performance for "Envious"
Chart (2001–2002)	Peak position
Australia (ARIA)	66
Australian Urban (ARIA)	14
New Zealand (Recorded Music NZ)	21
US Hot R&B/Hip-Hop Songs (Billboard)	99
