= Alright Already =

Alright Already may refer to:

- Alright Already (album), a 2017 album by Polish Club
- Alright, Already: Live in Montréal, a 2005 EP by Rufus Wainwright
- "Alright Already" (song), a song by Larry Stewart
- "Alright, Already", a song by Combustible Edison from Schizophonic!
- "Alright Already!", a song by Little Nobody from Pop Tart
- Alright Already (TV series), a 1997 sitcom starring Carol Leifer

== See also ==
- "Alright Already Now", a song by The Hellacopters from Grande Rock
- "Already Alright", a song by Yolanda Adams from The Experience
