= The Last Skeptik =

British rapper and music producer

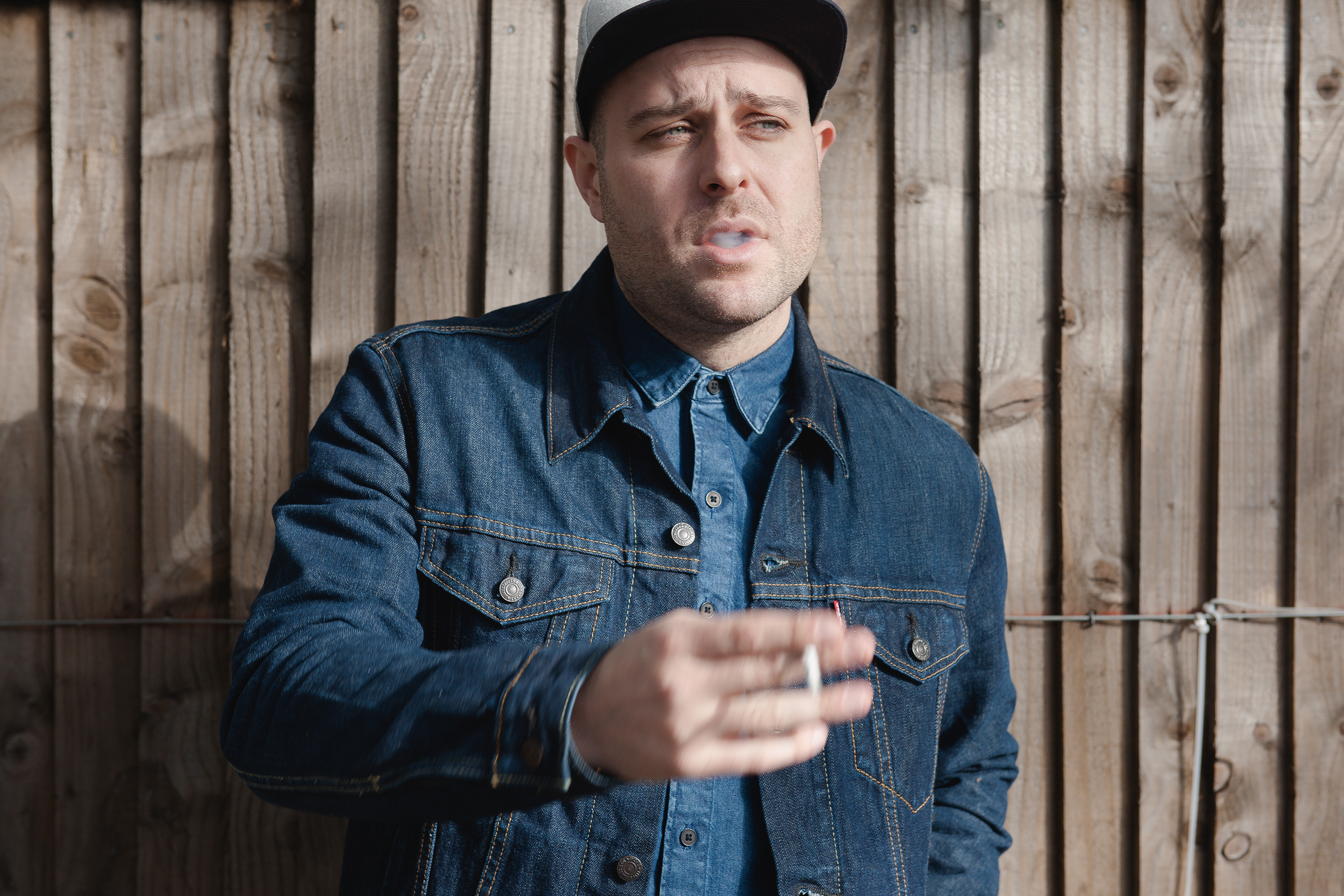
- Occupations: Hip hop producer, rapper and composer
- Years active: 2004–present
- Website: www.instagram.com/thelastskeptik

Corin Liall Douieb, known by the stage name The Last Skeptik, is a British rapper and music producer from Finsbury Park, London.

== Career ==
Douieb has worked with artists such as Giggs, Kojey Radical, Mikill Pane, Lunar C, Sway, and MF Grimm, Trim, and Scrufizzer.

His own independent label, Thanks for Trying Records, was established after Douieb left Barely Breaking Even (BBE), the first label he had signed with, in 2014. His 2017 joint EP with rapper Dream Mclean featured the single "Doing Bits".

His sophomore solo album This Is Where It Gets Good, was released in 2017 on his own label, Thanks for Trying Records, featured Kojey Radical, Trim, Takura, and Matt Wills, was released in 2017 on Thanks for Trying Records. His first album as a rapper - See You in The Next Life is a detailed journey about the breakdown of a relationship.

In 2019, Douieb composed the original score to the Royal Court Theatre play titled Superhoe, and made music that merged "street roughness with soulful polish", providing "buzzy highlights". In 2020, Douieb composed the original score to the Amazon Audible Original Audio Play entitled My Mum's A Twat performed by Susie Wokoma. In 2021, Douieb composed the original music for the theatre play Redemption at The Big House Theatre

Douieb hosts the Thanks for Trying Podcast, each episode inviting people from the world of entertainment to join him in drunk conversation, and has had notable guests such as Taika Waititi, Katherine Ryan, Ed Skrein, Kurupt FM, Romesh Ranganathan, Maverick Sabre, Example, Sara Pascoe and Rizzle Kicks.

The Last Skeptik's music has been used on adverts for Rihanna's Instagram, Fenty (fashion house), Mercedes, Adidas, Puma, Powerade and Reebok, and on the BBC's coverage of the 2012 Olympics, as well as Netflix's Guy Ritchie show The Gentlemen, Vice's documentary on Atlanta Stripclubs, and the BAFTA nominated short film Island Queen.

== Discography ==
=== Albums ===
- Thanks for Trying (2013)
- This is Where It Gets Good (2017)
- Under The Patio (2018)
- See You In The Next Life (2019)
- you don't like me but i'm still here (2021)
- Unreliable Narrator (2026)

=== EPs and collaborations ===
- Broken Window (2007) with Verb T
- How Not to Make a Living (2012, with Rewd Adams)
- A.F.Q.B – Kate Upton Ruined My Life (2014, with Illaman)
- I Don't Even Like You (2014)
- Revenge is The Best Success (2015)
- Drumroll Please Single (2017, with Dream Mclean, Jordan Stephens, Mikill Pane and Scrufizzer
- Cheese on Brown Bread (2017, with Dream Mclean)
- Nice While It Lasted E.P (2020)

=== Production credits ===
- Shampain (The Last Skeptik Remix) (2010) Marina & The Diamonds
- All Of This Is Yours (Feat. Baaba Maal) (2010) Get Cape. Wear Cape. Fly
- All Falls Down (2010) Get Cape. Wear Cape. Fly
- Drug Flow (2012) S.A.S
- Poison (The Last Skeptik Remix) (2013) Jehst
- Love Affair (2015) Scrufizzer x Haile WSTRN
- Story of Jin (2015) Scrufizzer
- Them or Me (2016) Trim & Nico Lindsay E.P
- Let MC It (2016) Mikill Pane E.P
- Switch (2019) Shay D
- All Quiet on The Eastern Front (2020) Mikill Pane featuring Dream Mclean
- Broken Britain (2021) Awate
- Another Episode (2021) Piers James

== Tours ==
- "Girl Power North America Tour" (2014, supporting Charli XCX)
- "Coachella" (2014)
- "The Last Skeptik India Tour" (2017)
- "Doc Brown UK Tour" (2017)
