= Little Derek =

- Cover for the CD single

Single by Sway DaSafo featuring Baby Blue

from the album This Is My Demo
- B-side: Download (12")/ Pretty Ugly Husband (7")
- Released: 16 January 2006
- Recorded: 2005
- Genre: British hip-hop
- Label: All City Music
- Songwriters: Sway DaSafo, Al Shux
- Producer: Al Shux

Sway DaSafo singles chronology
"Up Your Speed" (2005)	"Little Derek" (2006)	"Saturday Night Hustle" (2008)

"Little Derek" is the second single to be released by UK hip-hop artist Sway DaSafo from his debut album This Is My Demo. Released on 16 January 2006 on 12" and 7" vinyl and CD, it featured the British rapper Baby Blue. The single charted at #38.

== Track listings ==
=== CD single ===
1. "Little Derek (edit)"
2. "Little Derek" featuring Baby Blue
3. "Little Derek (instrumental)"
4. "Download"
5. "Download (Video)"
6. "Little Derek (Video)"

=== 12-inch single ===
A-side

1. "Little Derek (Full Version)" featuring Baby Blue
2. "Little Derek (instrumental)"

B-side

1. "Download (LP Version)"
2. "Download (Acapella)"

=== 7-inch single ===
A-side

1. "Little Derek (Full Version)" featuring Baby Blue

B-side

1. "Pretty Ugly Husband" featuring Latoya
