= Sway (British musician) =

British rapper (1982–2026)

- Also known as: Sway Dasafo
- Born: Derek Andrew Safo; 5 September 1982; Accra, Ghana
- Origin: Hornsey, London, England
- Died: 17 September 2026 (aged 44) Accra, Ghana
- Genre: Hip-hop
- Occupations: Rapper; record producer; actor
- Years active: 2004–2026
- Labels: Dcypha Productions / Island Records; 3Beat

Derek Andrew Safo (5 September 1982 – 17 September 2026), better known by his stage name Sway or Sway DaSafo, was a British rapper, record producer, actor and founder of Dcypha Productions.

In 2005, while unsigned, Sway won a MOBO Award for best hip-hop artist. He released his debut album This Is My Demo independently in February 2006, receiving a nomination for the Mercury Music Prize and reaching number 38 on the UK Singles Chart with the track "Little Derek". He later reached number 19 and 8 with the singles "Still Speedin'" and "Level Up", in 2011 and 2012 respectively.

== Life and career ==
Derek Andrew Safo was born on 5 September 1982 in Accra, Ghana, and raised in Hornsey, North London by Ghanaian parents Beatrice and Alhaji. He attended Campsbourne Junior School and then Highgate Wood Secondary School, where he spent time learning music production.

Sway cofounded Dcypha Productions with DJ Turkish and 'Jr' Appiah. He then began writing and producing his first official solo releases, This Is My Promo volumes 1 and 2 in 2004.

He became the first unsigned rapper to win a MOBO Award prior to the release of an official album. He released his debut album This Is My Demo independently. It received critical acclaim. and, despite a lack of mainstream radio support, sold over 50,000 copies within its first year of release. The album yielded the Al Shux-produced UK top 40 single "Little Derek", was nominated for the Mercury Music Prize and Sway became the first UK rapper to win a BET Hip Hop Award.

In 2008, Sway joined Akon's international Konvict Music label. Sway's second album The Signature LP was released in 2008 through Dcypha Productions. The album included production from Emile Haynie, The Nextmen, and Giorgio Tuinfort. This album was recognized for tracks such as "F UR X" which was a smash UK club record and the international door breaker "Silver & Gold" featuring Akon.

Sway collaborated with singer/songwriter Ed Sheeran. After overcoming some health issues, Sway decided it was time to release new music, and signed a singles deal with 3 Beat Records. Sway's first release on the label "Still Speedin'" was his first top 20 hit. The song was well received, and even received social media support from Nigel Mansell and Lewis Hamilton, who were both mentioned in the song.

He collaborated with many more artists, such as Mark Ronson and Childish Gambino to verses for Ghanaians Sarkodie and Edem. He was also the only other rapper to be featured on Lupe Fiasco's album "Lasers" released in 2011. Sway's next single "Level Up", written with Flux Pavilion, charted at number 8 on the UK Singles Chart.

In 2013, Sway signed Tiggs Da Author and KSI to Dcypha Productions. He featured both new artists on his EP Wake Up, which was his final release on 3beat records. The title track of the EP was produced by former Radio 1 DJ Zane Lowe and the track 'Back Someday' featured vocals from Ed Sheeran. In July 2015, Dcypha Productions became an imprint of Island Records.

In the same year, Sway released a long-awaited third album entitled Deliverance, which he described as "an affirmation of my intentions". The album was released with no lead singles or videos, as Sway wanted it to serve its true purpose as "a project to be discovered".

Dcypha signed singer/songwriter Sam Garrett, battle rap champion Lunar C and British and Asian R&B star Arjun to its roster. Dcypha Productions parted ways with Island Records in 2017 and Sway decided to focus on building New Reign Productions whilst maintaining his role as executive producer for KSI and Tiggs Da Author. He later oversaw the signing of Tiggs to the newly formed Alacran music label and established KSI as an independent music artist by releasing his Space EP independently. 2017 also saw the birth of Sway's second child Ammar-Joseph. The birth of his sons inspired him to put together two new albums Songs From The Stash and Stories From The Safe dedicated to them and released in 2019.

== Health and death ==
In 2010, Sway was diagnosed with Hodgkin lymphoma, which went into remission later that year.

Safo died at his home in Accra, Ghana, on 17 September 2026, at the age of 44.

== Discography ==
=== Studio albums ===
Title	Details	Chart positions
Title	Details	UK
This Is My Demo	Released: 5 February 2006; Label: Dcypha Productions; Formats: CD, digital download	45
The Signature LP	Released: 5 October 2008; Label: Dcypha Productions; Formats: CD, digital download	51
The Deliverance	Released: 24 July 2015; Label: Dcypha Productions; Formats: CD, digital download	155
Verses from the Vault	Released: 26 January 2018; Label: Dcypha Productions; Formats: CD, digital download	–
Verses from the Vault 2	Released: 26 January 2018; Label: Dcypha Productions; Formats: CD, digital download	–
"—" denotes album that did not chart or was not released.

=== Extended plays ===
Title	Details
Wake Up	Released: 20 October 2013; Label: 3Beat; Formats: Digital download
Songs from the Stash	Released: 1 November 2019; Label: New Reign Productions Limited; Formats: Digital download

=== Mixtapes ===
- This Is My Promo Vol. 1 (2004, DCypha)
- This Is My Promo Vol. 2 (DCypha)
- This Is My Rave (2006)
- The Dotted Lines Mixtape (2007, DCypha)
- One for the Journey (2007)
- The Signature LP Mixtape (2008, DCypha)
- The Delivery Mixtape (2010, DCypha)
- The Delivery Mixtape 2 – Lost in Transit (2010, DCypha)
- Bring Me to Africa (2010, DCypha)

=== With the group One ===
- Onederful World (2002, self-released) – DJ Amaes

=== Singles ===
==== As lead artist ====
Year	Single	Peak chart positions	Album
Year	Single	UK	Album
2005	"Up Your Speed" (featuring Pyrelli)	141	This Is My Demo
2006	"Little Derek" (featuring Baby Blue)	38	This Is My Demo
2006	"Products" (featuring El-Rae)	93	This Is My Demo
2008	"Saturday Night Hustle" (featuring Lemar)	67	The Signature LP
2009	"Silver & Gold" (featuring Akon)	61	The Signature LP
2009	"Mercedes Benz"	53	The Delivery Mixtape
2011	"Still Speedin'"	19	Non-album singles
2012	"Level Up"	8	Non-album singles
2012	"Charge" (featuring Mr Hudson)	—	Non-album singles
2013	"No Sleep" (featuring KSI and Tiggs Da Author)	44	Wake Up
2015	"Snap Shot" (featuring Sam Garrett)	—	The Deliverance
"—" denotes single that did not chart or was not released.

==== Promotional singles ====
Year	Single	Album
2005	"Download"	This Is My Demo
2008	"F UR X" (Feat. Stu$h)	The Signature LP
2010	"Everyday Valentine"	TBA
2010	"Pop a Bottle" (Feat. Donae'o)	TBA

==== Guest appearances ====
Year	Title	Album	Artist
2004	Cowboys & Indians feat. Sharkey Major & Bigz	Cowboy Film	Taz
2005	Harvey Nicks	A Breath Of Fresh Attire	The Mitchell Brothers
2005	Still On My Own	Set The Tone	Nate James
2005	Whoopsie Daisy (Copenhaniacs Remix)	Whoopsie Daisy	Terri Walker
2006	Chatterbox	The Amazing Adventures Of DJ Yoda	DJ Yoda
2006	Ridin' (UK Remix)	Ridin'	Chamillionaire
2007	Camera Tricks feat. Bridgette Amofah	This Was Supposed To Be The Future	The Nextmen
2007	Sorry feat. Baby Blue	"Sorry"	Madness
2007	Get Em High	Annie Nightingale Presents Y4K	Stanton Warriors
2007	March feat. Kyza	Satisfied	Verb T & The Last Skeptik
2007	Gimme Some	Powerful Music Volume 3	Sincere
2008	The Story Has Just Begun	A New Big-Inning	Bigz
2008	Hey Girl (Remix) feat. Natty Boii	Black Ice	Nia Jai
2008	I Won't Tell	My Own Way	Jay Sean
2008	Call My Name	Welcome To Wonderland	Wonder
2008	Take Me Back (Remix) feat. Taio Cruz & Chipmunk	Take Me Back	Tinchy Stryder
2009	Feel Like A King	N/A	Bigfoot
2009	What You Know	Two Fingers	Two Fingers
2009	Straw Men	Two Fingers	Two Fingers
2009	Two Fingers	Two Fingers	Two Fingers
2009	That Girl	Two Fingers	Two Fingers
2009	Jewels And Gems	Two Fingers	Two Fingers
2009	High Life	Two Fingers	Two Fingers
2009	Not Perfect	Two Fingers	Two Fingers
2009	Shifty feat. Plan B	Shifty	Riz MC
2009	It's A Crime	Flying High	Ali Campbell
2009	Bad Girl	Bad Girl	Two Fingers
2009	Home Sweet Home	Flight Of The Navigator	Bigz
2010	Hurting	Nightlife	Karl Wolf
2010	Ride With Me feat. Michael Essien & Asamoah Gyan	Ride Wit Me	Sagaboy
2010	Red Handed	Red Handed	Dzham
2010	The Way We Go	The Way We Go	Jukey
2010	Julia (Lake Of Stars Remix) feat. Mo Laudi, Lucius Banda & Tay Grin	The Very Best Remixes Of The Very Best	The Very Best
2010	I'm Fly	I'm Fly	Donae'o
2010	Mashup The Party	Fully Grown	Frisco
2010	Yours And My Children (Remix) feat. Black the Ripper & Lowkey	Yours And My Children	Akala
2010	Back To Biznizz feat. Nicole Jackson	Messy	K*Ners
2011	Nightmares feat. Wretch 32	No. 5 Collaborations Project	Ed Sheeran
2011	Break The Chain feat. Eric Turner	Lasers	Lupe Fiasco
2011	We Are Africans (Funky Remix)	African Dream	JJC
2011	I Just Wanna Rock You	They Are Among Us	Mason
2011	He Said She Said	Green Green Grasses	Kobi Onyame
2011	Amnesia	Amnesia	DarrenBailie
2011	Weather Man (Remix) feat. Skwilla & Pyrelli	Shooting Star 4	Tempman
2011	Shopaholic feat. McLean	Shopaholic	Wideboys
2011	This Is The Life	This Is The Life	Jamie King
2011	Ride With Me feat. Lukie D	Super C Season	Naeto C
2011	Winchi Winchi feat. Wande Coal & Dotstar	Something About You	Dr SID
2012	Suuliya	Solid Ground	Asem
2012	In Your Head (TJM Remix) feat. Ice Prince	In Your Head	Mohombi
2012	Light Me Up	Light Me Up	Lonsdale Boys Club
2012	Black Dyanamite	SuperTi2bs	Ti2bs
2013	Alright	TBA	Mark Knight
2013	Money feat. Jareth	Street Bass Anthems Vol. 6	Starkey
2013	The Poison ft Sway & Tigger Da Author	You Guess It Too	Mikill Pane
2014	Sweet Sixteen ft Sway	Shtick Heads	The Midnight Beast

==== Soundtracks ====
Year	Single
2011	Beat The World

== Filmography ==
Filmography
Year	Show	Role	Notes	Film/Television
2011	Top Boy	Ross Rosten	2 Episodes (Season 1, Episode 1 and 2)	Television
2012	Illegal Activity	Julian	(short film)	Film
2012	The Grind	"Thug"	Minor role	Film
2013	The Chase	Himself	Cameo appearance	Film

== Awards and nominations ==
Award	Prize	Result
MOBO Awards 2005	Best Hip Hop	Won
Urban Music Awards	Best Rap	Won
Urban Music Awards	Best Rap	Won
Ghana Music Awards	Best UK Act	Won
Blackstars Award	Best UK Act	Won
Screen Nation Award	Best Music Act	Won
Official Mixtape Awards	Mixtape Of The Decade	Won
BET Hip Hop Awards	Best UK Hip Hop Act	Won
Mercury Music Prize	Album Of The Year	Shortlisted
MOBO Award	Best Hip Hop	Nominated
BET Awards	Best International Artist	Nominated
