= The Signature LP =

Studio album by Sway DaSafo
- Released: 5 October 2008
- Recorded: 2007 – 2008
- Genres: British hip-hop; grime
- Labels: Konvict Muzik; Dcypha Productions
- Producers: Sway; Al Shux; Akon; Turkish; Emile; Terror Danjah & Scratcha DVA; Silverstone; CHOPS; Youngster; The Nextman; Guy Katsav

Sway DaSafo chronology
This Is My Demo (2006)	The Signature LP (2008)	Wake Up (2013)

Singles from The Signature LP
- 1. "F Ur X" Released: 16 June 2008; 2. "Saturday Night Hustle" Released: 15 September 2008; 3. "Silver & Gold" Released: 2 February 2009

Professional ratings
Review scores
Source	Rating
AllMusic	3.5/5 stars
Culturedeluxe	5/10 stars
The Independent	4/5 stars
Maxim	4/5 stars
Metro	3/5 stars
Orange	3/5 stars
RapReviews.com	8/10 stars

The Signature LP is the second studio album by British rapper Sway DaSafo, released on 5 October 2008. Most of the album was produced by Sway with his Dcypha Productions team; other producers included Louis Gibzen, Guy Katsav and Akon.

== Background ==
Plans for Sway's second album were made from the outset of his career. It was originally planned to be called This Is My Album, continuing with the This Is My... series which Sway had used for the titles of his first mixtapes and debut album. It was originally scheduled to be released on 5 May 2008 but was pushed back to 5 October 2008 to accommodate "Silver and Gold" featuring Akon. Sway released a free mixtape, titled The Signature Mixtape, to coincide with the album's release.

During the production of the album, Sway was affected by the deaths of close friends and family, to whom he dedicated the album to and mentioned in several tracks including "Pray 4 Kaya" which is dedicated Kaya Bousquet who died in early 2008.

The first single release from the album was "F Ur X", featuring $tush. The video for the song was released in May 2008. The music video features actors from Kidulthood and Adulthood and also includes Ashley Walters, Bashy and also Chipmunk. The second single was "Saturday Night Hustle", featuring soul singer Lemar. The third single was "Silver & Gold" featuring Akon which peaked at 67. A video was made for the single which features a cameo appearance from the footballer El Hadj Diouf. The Signature LP reached number 51 in the charts in the week after release.

== Production ==
Production of tracks for the album commenced in 2006 upon the release of This Is My Demo. Like his debut album, many of the tracks were produced by Sway himself as part of his DCypha Productions group. Sway was the executive producer with the co-executive producers being DJ Turkish, Bommer, Cheifer, Stowne and Daniel Goldberg. It was mastered by Naweed at Whitfield Mastering London. The album cover art and booklet was designed by Barrie Bee using photography from Alex Lake.

"Fit 4 A King" was produced and written by Sway with additional production and drum programming by Raptor for DCypha. It featured the London Studio Orchestra who performed at Angel Recording Studios for the track. The track featured additional vocals from Kadija Kamara, Tijani Aminu, Paul Cellantas and Kevin Tuffy who were all recorded at Soho Recording Studios. These were mixed by Guy Katsav at the Gaffe Studios.

"Say It Twice" was written by Sway and produced by DJ Turkish at Soho Recording Studios. "Saturday Night Hustle" involved the vocals of Lemar, who was recorded at Olympic Recording Studios, and Sewuese, who was recorded at Soho Recording Studios, as well as Sway, who was recorded at Apollo 440's Apollo Control Studios by Ashley Krajewski. The track, produced by Shux, was an adaptation of "Saturday Love" by Alexander O'Neal and Cherrelle. This was also mixed Guy Katsav.

"Silver & Gold" was produced by Sway, Akon and Giorgio Tuinfort, and mixed by Mark Goodchild on Akon's tour bus.

"F UR X" was produced by Sway and Youngster of DDSS Productions and mixed at The Gaffe Studios by DJ Turkish and Guy Katsav.

"Jason Waste" was produced by Sway and featured the vocals of Ellen King. It was recorded and mixed by Joe Fields and Ashley Krajewski at Soho Recording Studios and Apollo Control Studios, respectively.

"Look After My Girl" was produced by both Sway and Emile with mixing done by Guy Katsav and DJ Turkish at The Gaffe Studios.

"Pray 4 Kaya" was produced by Sway along with Akon and Giorgio Tuinfort. The vocals were recorded at Soho Recording Studios whilst additional mixing and recording was done at Cruise Control Studios in Amsterdam.

"Walk Away" was produced by Sway and DCypha member Silverstone. All instruments were performed by Silverstone who also provided the additional vocals for the track along with Father Noah and Anis Halloway.

"Upload" was produced by Terror Danjah, who produced "Download" off This Is My Demo, and Scratcha DVA. The track was mixed by Sway and Guy Katsav at the Soho Recording Studios.

"Stereo" was produced by both Sway and Chops at the Soho Recording Studios.

"Letters To Heaven" was produced mainly by The Nextmen with additional arrangement by Sway. The track features the vocals of Leo and Puffy, partly to whom the song is dedicated due to his death prior to the completion of the song. The instruments on the track were performed by The Nextmen and the London Studio Orchestra at Angel Recording Studios.

"End of the Road" was written by Sway with Marie Pelisser and Coco and produced by Louis Gibzen. It was mixed by Guy Katsav at The Gaffe Studios.

"Special Place" was produced by Sway with additional mixing by Guy Katsav. The keys were performed by Jason Silver, bass guitar by Amadu Koroma, electric guitar by Adam Sosner, percussion by Juba, saxophone by Yolonda Brown and orchestra strings by the London Studio Orchestra.

"Taxi" was a bonus track produced by Sway and Guy Katsav at The Gaffe Studios. It features the vocals of Christina Taylor.

"My Kind of Girl" was produced by Sway and mixed by Guy Katsav. Further work was done by Joe Fields and Kevin Tuffy at the Soho Recording Studios.

== Track listing ==
#	Title	Guest Performer(s)	Producer(s)	Length
1	"Fit 4 A King"		Sway	5:08
2	"Say It Twice"		Turkish	4:03
3	"Saturday Night Hustle"	Lemar & Slickx	Al Shux	3:18
4	"Silver & Gold"	Akon	Akon; co-produced by Giorgio Tuinfort	4:10
5	"F UR X"	$tush	Youngster	3:15
6	"Jason Waste"	Ellen King	Sway	3:35
7	"Look After My Girl"	Darren B	Emile	4:14
8	"Pray 4 Kaya"		Giorgio Tuinfort; co-produced by Akon	4:30
9	"Walk Away"	Father Noah	Silverstone	4:32
10	"Upload"		Terror Danjah & Scratcha DVA	4:45
11	"Stereo"		CHOPS; co-produced by Sway	4:00
12	"Letters To Heaven"	Leo	The Nextman	6:13
13	"End of the Road"	I Blame Coco	Sway, Louis Gibzen & Guy Katsav	4:45
14	"Special Place"	Loick Essien	Sway	4:59
15	"Taxi"		Guy Katsav	3:05
16	"My Kind of Girl"	2face Idibia	Sway	4:28
