= Al Shux =

English songwriter and producer

- Born: Alexander Shuckburgh
- Genres: Soul; hip-hop; electronic; R&B; pop
- Occupations: Producer; songwriter
- Years active: 2006–present

Alexander Shuckburgh, better known by his stage name Al Shux, is an English record producer and songwriter from London. He is known for his production work on Jay-Z's 2009 single "Empire State of Mind", which peaked on the Billboard Hot 100. Furthermore, he has been credited on releases for Kendrick Lamar, SZA, Doja Cat, Kali Uchis, Alicia Keys, Kelela, BANKS, Snoop Dogg, Nas, Santigold, La Roux, Plan B, Tinie Tempah, and Lana Del Rey, among others.

== Career ==
In 2009, Shux produced and co-wrote the Jay-Z track "Empire State of Mind", which earned him a Grammy in the Best Rap/Sung Collaboration category.

In 2012, Shux wrote music for Plan B's film Ill Manors. He also co-wrote and produced seven songs on the film's Mercury Prize-nominated soundtrack album, including the title track, which The Guardian hailed as "the greatest British protest song in years".

In 2018, Shux co-wrote and produced Kendrick Lamar and SZA's "All the Stars" for the Black Panther OST.

== Discography ==
| Artist | Release | Year | Record label | Credit |
|---|---|---|---|---|
| Jenevieve | "Chrome Dreamz" | 2026 | Interscope | Producer, co-writer |
| Wesley Joseph, Jorja Smith | "July" | 2026 | Secretly Canadian | Producer, co-writer |
| Bellah | "Fallin'" | 2026 | Sonitus Recordings | Producer, co-writer |
| Bellah | "WDIMTY" | 2026 | Sonitus Recordings | Producer, co-writer |
| Saam Sultan | "Endeavour" | 2025 | Darkroom | Producer, co-writer |
| ilham | "Love Away" | 2025 | FortyOneTen | Producer, co-writer |
| Kali Uchis | "Breeze!" | 2025 | Capitol | Producer, co-writer |
| Anella | "Julianna" | 2025 | Def Jam | Producer, co-writer |
| Amanda Reifer | "Devastating (Interlude)" | 2024 | Atlantic | Producer, co-writer |
| Emir Taha | "Bi O Yana Bi Bu Yana" from E.T. Phone Home | 2024 | Hoppa Records | Producer, co-writer |
| Emir Taha | "Jealousy" from E.T. Phone Home | 2024 | Hoppa Records | Producer, co-writer |
| Solomon | "unrequited" | 2023 | Parlophone | Producer, co-writer |
| Annika Wells | "i wanna rip your clothes off" | 2023 | Boom Records | Producer, co-writer |
| Sekou | "You and I" | 2023 | Republic | Producer, co-writer |
| KSI, Bugzy Malone, R3HAB | "Easy" | 2023 | Warner | Producer, co-writer |
| JAY-Z, Gil Scott-Heron | "New York (Concept De Paris)" | 2023 | Roc Nation | Co-writer |
| Kali Uchis | "All Mine" from Red Moon in Venus | 2023 | Geffen | Producer, co-writer |
| Nathan Archie | "Hurt Me Enough" | 2022 | Nathan Archie | Producer, co-writer |
| Santigold | "The Lasty" from Spirituals | 2022 | Little Jerk Records | Co-writer |
| Hope Tala | "Is It Enough" | 2022 | Republic | Producer, co-writer |
| London Grammar | "How Does It Feel" from Californian Soil | 2021 | Ministry of Sound | Co-writer |
| Banks | "The Devil" from Serpentina | 2021 | AWAL, Her Name Is Banks | Producer, co-writer |
| Shakka | "Take It There" from Road Trip to Venus | 2021 | Base 'N' Rebulz x Marathon Artists | Producer, co-writer |
| Zara Larsson | "Morning" from Poster Girl (Summer Edition) | 2021 | Epic | Producer |
| Dylan Cartlidge | "Step On" from Hope Above Adverstity | 2021 | Glassnote Music | Producer, co-writer |
| Doja Cat | "Naked" from Planet Her | 2021 | RCA | Producer, co-writer |
| Regard feat. Kwabs | "Signals" | 2021 | Ministry of Sound | Co-writer |
| Kyle Dion | "Stressed Out" | 2020 | Kyle Dion | Producer, co-writer |
| Alma | "Bad News Baby" from Have U Seen Her? | 2020 | Epic Local | Producer, co-writer |
| Alina Baraz | "My Whole Life" from It Was Divine | 2020 | Mom + Pop | Producer, co-writer |
| GRACEY | "99%" from The Art of Closure | 2020 | Polydor | Producer, co-writer |
| Lola Young | "6 Feet Under" | 2019 | Island | Producer |
| Mabel | "We Don't Say" from High Expectations | 2019 | Polydor | Producer, co-writer |
| Hopium feat. Jafaris | "I Forget My Name" | 2019 | Warner | Producer, co-writer |
| Alma | "Summer" | 2019 | Epic Local | Producer, co-writer |
| Khalid | "Bad Luck" from Free Spirit | 2019 | RCA | Producer, co-writer |
| L Devine | "Can't Be You" | 2018 | Warner | Producer, co-writer |
| Kendrick Lamar feat. SZA | "All the Stars" from Black Panther OST | 2018 | TDE | Producer, co-writer |
| Plan B | "Heartbeat" from Heaven Before All Hell Breaks Loose | 2017 | Atlantic | Producer, co-writer |
| Banks | "Underdog" | 2017 | Harvest | Producer, co-writer |
| Kelela | Take Me Apart from Take Me Apart | 2017 | Warp | Co-producer, co-writer |
| Vancouver Sleep Clinic | Revival | 2017 | Kemosabe | Producer, co-writer |
| Will Heard | "I Better Love You" from Trust EP | 2017 | Black Butter | Co-writer |
| Erik Hassle | "Missesota", "All of You All Over Me" from Innocence Lost | 2017 | TEN | Co-producer, co-writer |
| Taya | "Deeper" | 2016 | Atlantic | Producer, co-writer |
| Banks | "Fuck With Myself" from The Altar | 2016 | Harvest | Producer, co-writer |
| Shura | "Kidz 'N' Stuff" from Nothing's Real | 2016 | Polydor | Co-producer, co-writer |
| Erik Hassle | "If Your Man Only Knew" from Innocence Lost | 2016 | TEN | Producer, co-writer |
| Kwabs | "Fight for Love" from Love + War | 2015 | Warner | Co-producer, co-writer |
| Sam Bruno | "Search Party" | 2015 | Atlantic | Producer, co-writer |
| Lianne La Havas | "What You Don't Do" from Blood | 2015 | Warner | Co-producer |
| Kimbra | "Goldmine" from The Golden Echo | 2015 | Warner | Co-producer |
| Ella Henderson | "Mirror Man" | 2014 | Syco | Producer, co-writer |
| Elliphant | "Purple Light" feat Doja Cat from One More | 2014 | TEN | Producer, co-writer |
| Kwabs | "Saved" from Walk EP | 2014 | Warner | Producer, co-writer |
| La Roux | "Cruel Sexuality" from Trouble in Paradise | 2014 | Polydor | Producer |
| Banks | "Drowning" from Goddess | 2014 | Harvest | Producer, co-writer |
| Katy B | "Wicked Love" from Little Red | 2014 | Rinse | Producer, co-writer |
| Lana Del Rey | "Young and Beautiful" from The Great Gatsby | 2013 | Interscope | Co-producer |
| Elle Varner | "Oh What a Night" from Perfectly Imperfect | 2012 | RCA | Producer, co-writer |
| Plan B | Ill Manors | 2012 | Atlantic | Producer, co-writer |
| Nas | "Roses" from Life Is Good | 2012 | Def Jam | Producer, co-writer |
| Paloma Faith | "Freedom" from Fall to Grace | 2012 | RCA | Producer, co-writer |
| Lana Del Rey | "This Is What Makes Us Girls" from Born to Die | 2012 | Interscope | Producer |
| I Blame Coco | "In Spirit Golden", "The Constant", "Party Bag", and "Atlantis Found" from The Constant | 2010 | Warner | Co-writer |
| Tinie Tempah | "Illusion", "Simply Unstoppable" from Disc-Overy | 2010 | Parlophone | Producer, co-writer |
| Alicia Keys | "Empire State of Mind (Part II) Broken Down" from The Element of Freedom | 2009 | RCA | Producer, co-writer |
| Jay-Z | "Empire State of Mind" from The Blueprint 3 | 2009 | Roc Nation | Producer, co-writer |
| Sway | "Saturday Night Hustle" (featuring Lemar) from The Signature LP | 2008 | Dcypha | Producer, co-writer |
| 2face Idibia | "Go Down There" from The Unstoppable | 2008 | Hypertek | Producer, co-writer |
| Lupe Fiasco featuring Snoop Dogg and Poo Bear | "Hi-Definition" from Lupe Fiasco's The Cool | 2007 | Atlantic | Producer, co-writer |
| Sway | "Little Derek", "Back for You, "Products", "On My Own", "Sick World" from This Is My Demo | 2006 | Dcypha | Co-producer, co-writer |

== Awards and nominations ==
2006

- Mercury Music Prize
  - Nominated: Album of the Year – Sway – This Is My Demo

2010

- ASCAP
  - Won: Song of the Year – "Empire State of Mind"
  - Won: Rap Song of the Year – "Empire State of Mind"
  - Nominated: Most Performed Song of the Year – "Empire State of Mind"

2012

- Mercury Music Prize
  - Nominated: Best Album – Ill Manors
- MOBO's
  - Won: Best Hip Hop/Grime: Plan B
- 53rd Grammy Awards
  - Nominated: Record of the Year – Empire State of Mind
  - Won: Best Rap Song – "Empire State of Mind"

2013

- Ivor Novello Awards
  - Nominated: Best Contemporary Song – "Ill Manors", performed by Plan B
  - Nominated: Best Original Film Score – Ill Manors, performed by Plan B
- Brit Awards
  - Nominated: MasterCard BriSsh Album of the Year – Plan B – Ill Manors

2019

- 91st Academy Awards
  - Nominated: Best Original Song – "All the Stars"
- 61st Grammy Awards
  - Nominated: Record of the Year – "All the Stars"
  - Nominated: Song of the Year – "All the Stars"
  - Nominated: Best Song Written for Visual Media – "All the Stars"
- 76th Golden Globe Awards
  - Nominated: Best Original Song – "All the Stars"

2022

- 64th Grammy Awards
  - Nominated: Album of the Year – Doja Cat - Planet Her
