= Zane Lowe =

New Zealand DJ and radio presenter

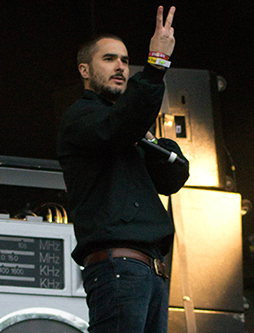
- Lowe at RockNess 2012
- Born: Alexander Zane Reed Lowe; 7 August 1973 (age 53); Auckland, New Zealand
- Spouse: Kara Walters (m. 1999)
- Children: 2
- Presenting career
- Show: The Zane Lowe Show
- Stations: BBC Radio 1 (2003–2015); MTV Two; Apple Music 1
- Style: DJ; record producer; television presenter

Alexander Zane Reed Lowe (born 7 August 1973) is a New Zealand radio DJ, live DJ, record producer, radio host and television presenter. After an early career in music creation, production and DJing, he moved to the UK in 1997. He came to prominence through presenting on XFM and MTV Europe (MTV Two), developing a DJ career by opening sets for bands and eventually landing a slot on prime-time radio on BBC Radio 1 from 2003 to 2015. In 2015, he was hired by Apple to be the Creative Director of their new world-wide music station, Apple Music 1.

== Career ==
=== Early career ===
Born in Auckland, Lowe attended Auckland Grammar School and was a presenter on local music station Max TV. Zane was a member of Urban Disturbance, an early 90s hip hop group whose standout hit was "No Flint No Flame" and Breaks Co-Op, alongside Andy Lovegrove and Hamish Clark. Lowe and Clark formed Breaks Co-Op in Auckland, releasing the electronic album Roofers in 1997 before they both left New Zealand to travel and pursue other interests. Both later developed their careers in the United Kingdom.

=== DJ ===
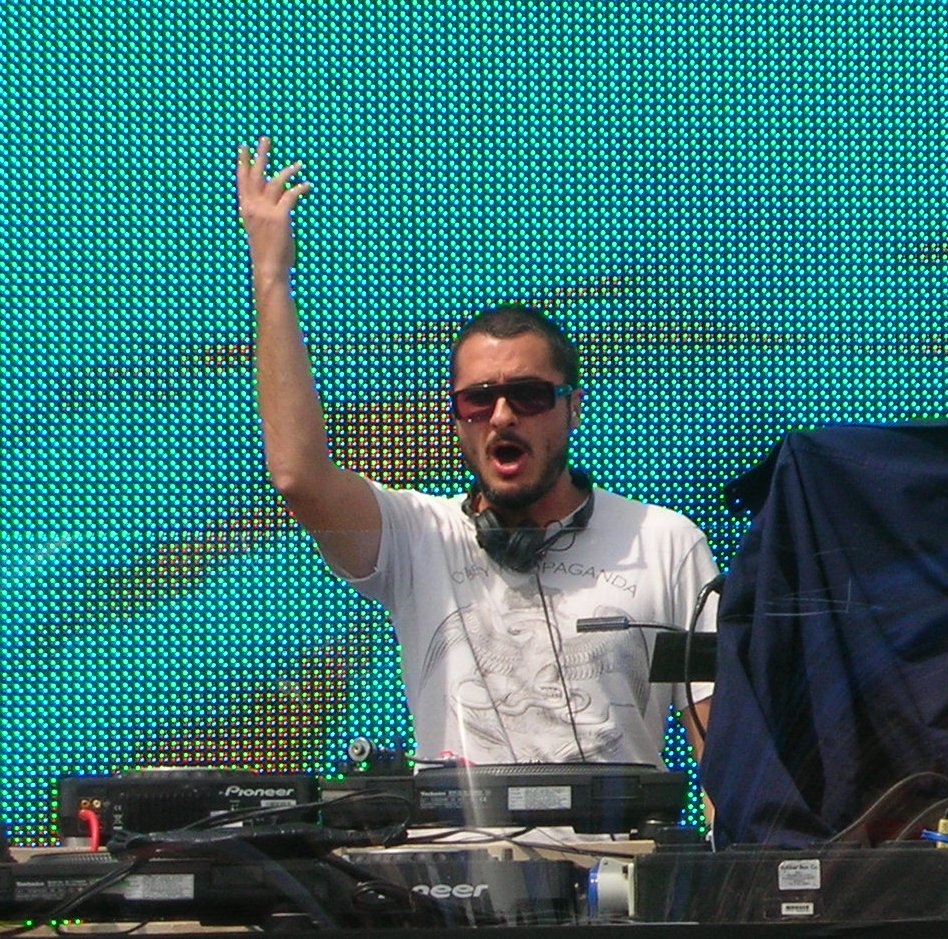
Lowe performing live

Lowe relocated to the United Kingdom in 1997. He initially worked at the Record and Tape Exchange in Notting Hill before being asked to cover for a show on XFM, going on to host XFM's Music Response. In 2003, he joined BBC Radio 1.

As a DJ, he has played sets at festivals including Coachella, Future Music Festival in Australia, Glastonbury, Creamfields and Bestival. He has toured with artists including, Skrillex, The Prodigy, Kasabian and The Weeknd and opened shows for both Muse and Foo Fighters at their concerts at Wembley Stadium. As well as being a regular performer at Ibiza and Mallorca Rocks, Lowe is also musical director for the brand.

=== MTV ===
Lowe started his career on MTV UK before moving to MTV2 Europe (now MTV Rocks) presenting shows such as MTV News (1998–2001), MTV News Daily Edition (1999–2001) and Brand:New (1999). From 2002 to 2015, he presented Gonzo, the channel's flagship music show.

=== BBC Radio 1 ===
Lowe's BBC Radio 1 evening show was broadcast from 2003 to 2015. The show developed a number of features including the "Zane Lowe Meets" interviews.

On 15 February 2015 it was announced that Lowe would be leaving BBC Radio 1 in March 2015 to launch a new station with Apple. Lowe presented his last show on 5 March 2015.

=== Apple Music 1 ===
At the 2015 Apple WWDC Keynote, Lowe was introduced as one of the DJs of Apple Music 1 (previously Beats 1), a radio station part of Apple Music. He was also the host of the Apple Music show Planet of the Apps.

== Awards and nominations ==
Year	Awards	Category	Result
2005	NME Awards	Best Radio Show	Won
2006	NME Awards	Best Radio Show	Won
2007	NME Awards	Best Radio Show	Won
2008	NME Awards	Best Radio Show	Won
2010	Radio Academy Awards	Music Broadcaster of the Year	Gold
2010	Radio Academy Awards	Best Specialist Music Programme	Gold
2011	Radio Academy Awards	Music Broadcaster of the Year	Gold
2012	Artist Manager Awards	Industry Champion	Won
2014	Radio Academy Awards	Best Specialist Music Programme	Bronze
2014	Radio Academy Awards	Music Radio Broadcaster of the Year	Gold
2015	Grammy Awards	Album of the Year (Sam Smith‚ In the Lonely Hour)	Nominated

== Ryan Jarman incident ==
Lowe saved Ryan Jarman's life at the 2006 NME Awards, in an incident which NME referred to as "engraved in indie folklore". The incident occurred when Jarman's band, the Cribs, accepted an award on behalf of winners Franz Ferdinand. While on his way to collect the trophy from presenter Russell Brand, Jarman fell onto the Kaiser Chiefs' table and pierced his back with broken glass, narrowly missing his vital organs.

Jarman was taken to hospital but discharged himself to return for the show's after-party later in the night. However, he fell unconscious in a back corridor. Lowe, a fellow guest at the party, found Jarman lying on the floor bleeding profusely and another ambulance was called which took Jarman to hospital where doctors stitched up the injuries.

== Discography ==
=== Remixes ===
Year	Song	Artist
1995	"What I Gotta Do"	3 the Hard Way
2008	"Look for the Woman"	Dan Le Sac vs Scroobius Pip
2008	"F Ur X"	Sway
2009	"Vlad the Impaler"	Kasabian
2011	"Still Speedin'"	Sway
2012	"Lightspeed"	Kill the Noise & Datsik
2012	"In the End" (Whateverman Remix)	Snow Patrol
2023	"Running Out of Time" (Re: Zane Lowe)	Paramore

=== Writing and production credits ===
Year	Title	Artist	Album
2012	"Blood from a Stone"	Example	The Evolution of Man
2013	"Count on Me"	Chase & Status featuring Moko	Brand New Machine
2013	"Wake Up"	Sway	Wake Up
2013	"Dot"	Amplify Dot	Paper Cuts
2013	"5 Minutes"	Tinie Tempah	Demonstration
2014	"Restart"	Sam Smith	In the Lonely Hour
2014	"Running Low"	Netsky featuring Beth Ditto	Non-album single
2014	"Walking Out"	Liam Bailey	Definitely Now
2015	"Baby Blue"	Action Bronson featuring Chance the Rapper	Mr. Wonderful
