= AllBright Law Offices =

Chinese law firm

AllBright Law Offices 锦天城律师事务所
- Headquarters: Shanghai, China
- No. of offices: 13
- No. of lawyers: 1,000+ (2015)
- Major practice areas: Corporate & Commercial, Securities & Capital Markets, Banking & Finance, Real Estate & Construction, Dispute Resolution, International Trade, Intellectual Property
- Key people: Wu Mingde (Director)
- Date founded: January 1, 1999
- Website: AllBrightLaw.com

AllBright Law Offices (Chinese: 锦天城律师事务所) is a Shanghai-based Chinese law firm ranked the seventh largest in the country and eighth largest in Asia by number of lawyers. Among national corporate law firms, AllBright is the only one headquartered in Shanghai.

AllBright was founded on January 1, 1999, from the merger of three Shanghai-based law firms, Jin Lian, Tianhe, and Great Wall.

== Practice areas ==
AllBright's main practice areas include:

- Corporate and commercial (including mergers and acquisitions)
- Securities and capital markets
- Banking and finance
- Real estate and infrastructure
- Intellectual property
- International trade (including WTO disputes)
- Dispute resolution (arbitration and litigation)

== Offices ==
AllBright presently has offices located in 23 cities in mainland China, Hong Kong SAR, and additional offices in London, Seattle, Singapore, and Tokyo:

- Mainland China: Shanghai, Hangzhou, Suzhou, Nanjing, Qingdao, Xiamen, Hefei, Zhengzhou, Fuzhou, Nanchang, Changsha, Beijing, Tianjin, Jinan, Taiyuan, Changchun, Shenzhen, Guangzhou, Wuhan, Changsha, Kunming, Haikou, Chengdu, Chongqing, Xi’an, Urumqi
- Hong Kong SAR: Hong Kong
- International: London, Seattle, Singapore, Tokyo

AllBright marked the opening of its first office outside of mainland China on November 15, 2013 through an association and eventual merger with the Hong Kong-based law firm of Stevenson, Wong & Co.

== Global alliances ==
AllBright has a long-standing strategic alliance with NCTM Law Firm of Italy.

AllBright is one of the original member firms of the Sino-Global Legal Alliance, which was formed with Lovells in 2007. The SGLA is a non-exclusive referral network which provides clients with legal services in mainland China and abroad.

AllBright signed a formal (non-exclusive) cooperation agreement in 2012 with De Pardieu law firm of France, cementing already existing working relationships on cross-border transactions.
