= Wake Up (Sway EP) =

EP by Sway
- Released: 20 October 2013
- Genres: British hip-hop; electro house
- Labels: All Around the World; 3Beat
- Producers: Zane Lowe; Raptor; Sway; Turkish; Drew Phantom

Sway chronology
| The Signature LP (2008) | Wake Up (2013) | The Deliverance (2014) |

Wake Up is an extended play (EP) by the British rapper Sway. It was released on 20 October 2013 through 3Beat under exclusive license to All Around the World. The title track is produced by BBC Radio 1 DJ Zane Lowe. "No Sleep" featuring KSI and Tigger Da Author has received widespread recognition from KSI's YouTube fanbase. An official music video for the song premiered on 20 October 2013, and in two days had accumulated almost a million views. The single version of the song also features Tubes from Soccer AM. "Back Someday" features uncredited vocals from Ed Sheeran. "No Sleep" reached number 34 in the UK Midweeks Chart, and on Sunday entered the UK Singles Chart at number 44.

== Track listing ==
Digital download
| No. | Title | Writer(s) | Producer(s) | Length |
|---|---|---|---|---|
| 1. | "Wake Up" | Derek Safo; Zane Lowe | Zane Lowe | 3:09 |
| 2. | "To Be Frank" | Safo; Raptor | Raptor | 4:03 |
| 3. | "Back Someday" | Safo; Ed Sheeran; The Boxettes | Sway | 4:52 |
| 4. | "No Sleep" (Main Radio Edit) (featuring KSI and Tigger Da Author) | Safo; Olajide Olatunji; Tigger Da Author | Sway; Turkish^{[a]}; Drew Phantom^{[a]} | 3:26 |
| 5. | "Wake Up" (Xilent Radio Edit) | Safo; Lowe | Zane Lowe; Eryk Kowalczyk^{[b]} | 3:38 |
| 6. | "No Sleep" (iTunes Version) (featuring KSI, Tigger Da Author and Tubes) | Safo; Olatunji; Tigger Da Author | Sway; Turkish^{[a]}; Drew Phantom^{[a]} | 3:08 |

Notes

- ^{^a} signifies a co-producer
- ^{^b} signifies a remixer
- "Wake Up" samples "Fight the Power (Part 1 & 2)" by The Isley Brothers.
- "Back Someday" features vocals from Ed Sheeran.

== Chart performance ==
=== For "No Sleep" ===
Chart positions listed for "No Sleep".

| Chart (2013) | Peak position |
|---|---|
| Scottish Singles Sales (Official Charts) | 41 |
| UK Singles (Official Charts) | 44 |
| UK Hip Hop/R&B (Official Charts) | 11 |

=== For "Wake Up" ===
Chart positions listed for "Wake Up".

| Chart (2013) | Peak position |
|---|---|
| UK Singles (Official Charts) | 183 |

== Release history ==
| Region | Date | Format | Label |
|---|---|---|---|
| Worldwide | 20 October 2013 | Digital download | All Around the World, 3Beat |
