= Allwright =

- Language: English

Origin
- Language: Old English
- Origin: Aldrich
- Derivation: ald + rich
- Meaning: old + rule

Other names
- Variant forms: Allright, Oldwright

Allwright is an English language surname. Notable people with the surname include:

- Charles Allwright (1888–1966), English footballer
- Charles Allwright (1902–1978), English table tennis player
- Graeme Allwright (1926–2020), New Zealand-French singer/songwriter
- Harry Allwright (1837–1892), New Zealand politician
- Joel Allwright (born 1988), Australian footballer
- Matt Allwright, English television presenter
