= Mercedes-Benz (Sway song) =

Single by Sway DaSafo

from the album The Delivery Mixtape
- Released: 25 October 2009
- Recorded: 2009
- Genre: Hip-Hop/Rap
- Length: 3:14
- Label: Dcypha Productions

Sway DaSafo singles chronology
"Silver & Gold" (2009)	"Mercedes-Benz" (2009)	"Still Speedin'" (2011)

"Mercedes-Benz" is a single released by Ghanaian British musician Sway from The Delivery Mixtape. The single was released on 25 October 2009. It peaked at number 53 on the UK Singles Chart.

== Track listing ==
UK Digital download

1. "Mercedes-Benz" (Radio Edit) – 3:14
2. "Silver & Gold" (2010 Remix) [feat. Akon & Tinchy Stryder] – 3:51

== Chart performance ==
Chart (2009)	Peak position
UK Singles (OCC)	53

== Release history ==
Region	Date	Format	Label
United Kingdom	25 October 2009	Digital Download	Dcypha Productions
