= This Is My Demo =

2006 studio album by Sway

Studio album by Sway DaSafo
- Released: 5 February 2006
- Recorded: 2005–2006
- Genres: Hip-hop; R&B
- Length: 58:41
- Label: All City Music
- Producers: Sway, Dcypha Productions, Al Shux, Terror Danjah, Turkish, Baby Blue

Sway DaSafo chronology
This Is My Demo (2006)	The Signature LP (2008)

Professional ratings
Aggregate scores
Source	Rating
Metacritic	81/100
Review scores
Source	Rating
AllMusic	4/5 stars
The Guardian	4/5 stars
Mojo	4/5 stars
NME	7/10
The Observer	4/5 stars
Pitchfork	8.1/10
Q	4/5 stars
Spin	4/5 stars
Stylus	A
Uncut	7/10

This Is My Demo is the debut album from British rapper Sway. It was released on 5 February 2006 and produced by Sway for Dcypha Productions. It consists mainly of hip-hop and R&B music genres. The album was critically well received and spent two weeks on the chart, with a peak of number 78. The album was produced by Sway himself along with producers Joe Fields, Terror Danjah, Turkish, Bigz, Ramiz, Tamiz, Big E.D. and Al Shux who produced almost all of the songs, including the single Little Derek.

== Track listing ==
#	Title	Featured guest(s)	Producer	Length
1	"This Is My Demo"	Sewuese	Sway, Al Shux and Tamiz	6:00
2	"Products"	El Rae	Sway, Al Shux and Joe Fields	3:30
3	"Hype Boys"	Bigz	Sway, Bigz and Ramiz	5:07
4	"Little Derek"	Baby Blue	Sway, Al Shux, Ramiz, Joe Fields and Baby Blue	5:16
5	"Pretty Ugly Husband"		Sway and Joe Fields	3:41
6	"Flo Fashion"		Sway and Ramiz	3:37
7	"Up Your Speed"	Pyrelli	Sway	2:56
8	"Download"		Sway and Terror Danjah	4:42
9	"Loose Woose"	Bigz, Pyrelli And Hayden	Sway and Turkish	4:09
10	"Sick World"	Sewuese	Sway and Al Shux	
11	"Still on My Own"	Nate James	Sway, Al Shux and Nate James	3:11
12	"Back for You"	Haydon and Ny	Sway, Al Shux and Joe Fields	3:44
13	"Slo' Down" (Bonus Track)		Sway and Al Shux	4:48
14	"Month in the Summer" (Bonus Track)	Teddy	Sway and Al Shux	3:49

- Track seven contains a sample of Fleetwood Mac's "The Chain"

== This Is My DVD ==
On some versions of "This Is My Demo" a special DVD was included called "This Is My DVD". The track listing for the DVD is as follows:

1. "Flo Fashion"
2. "Up Your Speed"
3. "Little Derek"
4. "Download"
5. "Radio 1"
6. "On Tour"
7. "In the Studio"
8. "NYC"
9. "Live!"
10. "Bonus Track"

=== Production ===
- Sway DaSafo, Al Shux, and Tamiz – track 1
- Sway DaSafo, Al Shux, and Joe Fields – track 2
- Sway DaSafo, Bigz, and Ramiz – track 3
- Sway DaSafo, Al Shux, Ramiz, Joe Fields, and Baby Blue – track 4
- Sway DaSafo and Joe Fields – track 5
- Sway DaSafo and Ramiz – track 6
- Sway DaSafo, D. Watson, L. Buckingham, M. Fleetwood, S. Nicks, C. McVie, J. McVie, and M. Meredith – track 7
- Sway DaSafo, R. Cryce, R. Annor, Big E.D., and Terror Danjah – track 8
- Sway DaSafo, T. Salih, D. Watson, T. Oriola, Haydon, and Turkish – track 9
- Sway DaSafo, Al Shux and M. Pusey – track 10
- Sway DaSafo, Al Shux and Nate James – track 11
- Sway DaSafo, Al Shux, and Joe Fields – track 12
- Sway DaSafo and Al Shux – track 13
- Sway DaSafo and Al Shux – track 14
