= Kddk =

Russian singer (born 1986)

- Born: Kirill Igorievich Lupinos; January 27, 1986 (age 40)
- Origin: Smolensk, Russia
- Genres: Hip-hop, techno, pop,
- Occupation: artist
- Labels: Radikal Records US, TOCO International NL, Effective Records
- Website: Official Website

Kirill Igorievich Lupinos (born January 27, 1986), known professionally as Kddk and formerly as Dzham, is an artist who began his musical career in hip hop, and later gradually gone over to the club theme, becoming an artist in the genre of mash up hip-hop and dance in Russia. He managed to release four albums in his native tongue.. He is the owner of Effective Records label.

== Biography ==
In the beginning of 2009 Kddk acquainted with Fredro Starr, the frontman of the hip hop group Onyx. During their Russian tour they record the song together "Say What" and the same day make the video clip in St.Peterburg. Afterwards signed contracts with TOCO International NL and Radikal Records US. He becomes the only Russian artist in the genre of hip hop, which has contracts with international labels.

At the end of 2009th in Philadelphia Kddk became acquainted with the musician and producer Jim Beanz, author of the winning song of Eurovision 2008 Dima Bilan ("Believe Me"). They worked together to create a track called "Every Day", which received extensive airplay on Russian music television channels and radio stations.

In 2009 while in London Kddk made experiments with dance music. He collaborated on recording of the song "Red Handed" with the British rapper Sway DaSafo. The song soon received appreciation at MIDEM 2010. Later Dzham presented the track "Slow Down" with the British music star DJ Ironik

In 2010 Kddk recorded mixtape with American hip hop DJ DJ Whoo Kid (G Unit, Shadyville), which represented all the tracks recorded over the past year, including the lead single, self-explanatory track entitled “I’m From Russia”, with a video clip

In 2011 Kddk released his new video for the track "I Like It", featuring singer and musician David Todua moving further away from the hip hop tendency. The music video "I Like It" was filmed in one take in a London club by British video director Dan Ruttley, who has accomplished projects for Paul McCartney, Led Zeppelin, James Brown, Take That, as well as for artists of the UK hip hop scene such as Sway and Chipmunk.

In his free time from studio work Dzham is touring in Russia as well as in New York, London, Paris, Düsseldorf, Tallinn.

== Discography ==
- Dzham & Dj Whoo Kid - Im From Russia (2010)
- Dzham – Once and for all (2008)
- Dzham – Dzham the Leader! (2008)
- Dzham – Real Predator (2007)

== Videography ==
- Dzham ft. David Todua - I Like It (2011)
- Dzham – Im From Russia (2010)
- Dzham ft. Sway – RedHanded (2010)
- Dzham – Get It Girl (2009)
- Dzham – Every Day (2009)
- Dzham - Bossi Babosi (2009)
- Dzham ft Onyx - Say What (2009)
