= Still Speedin' =

Single by Sway
- Released: 4 December 2011
- Recorded: 2011
- Genre: British hip hop, R&B, grime, dubstep
- Length: 3:00
- Label: 3 Beat
- Songwriters: Derek Safo, Dan Hartman, Lewis Fuller, Andrew Mutambira, Giorgio Tuinfort, David Wiggins

Sway singles chronology
"Mercedes Benz" (2009)	"Still Speedin'" (2011)	"Level Up" (2012)

"Still Speedin'" is a single released by Ghanaian British musician Sway as the lead single from his third album The Deliverance, although it was not ultimately included on the album. The song features a sample of 'Ride on Time' by Black Box. The single was released on 4 December 2011. It peaked to number 19 on the UK Singles Chart. There are two alternate versions of the song featuring Kano or Lupe Fiasco.

== Music video ==
A music video to accompany the release of "Still Speedin'" was first released onto YouTube on 24 October 2011 at a total length of three minutes and nineteen seconds. Magician Dynamo makes a cameo appearance.

== Track listing ==
Digital download
No.	Title	Length
1.	"Still Speedin'" (Radio Edit)	3:00
2.	"Still Speedin'" (featuring Kano)	3:00
3.	"Still Speedin'" (Vato Gonzalez Radio Edit)	3:04
4.	"Still Speedin'" (Vato Gonzalez Vocal Mix)	5:50
5.	"Still Speedin'" (Doorly Mix)	6:40
6.	"Still Speedin'" (Kill The Noise Mix)	4:06
7.	"Still Speedin'" (Zane's Death Valley Mix)	3:39

Still Speedin' (Reloaded)
No.	Title	Length
1.	"Still Speedin'" (featuring Lupe Fiasco)	3:44
2.	"Still Speedin'" (Radio Edit)	3:00
3.	"Still Speedin'" (Extended Mix)	4:00
4.	"Still Speedin'" (Instrumental Mix)	3:56

== Chart performance ==
Chart (2011)	Peak position
UK Singles (Official Charts)	19
UK Hip Hop/R&B (Official Charts)	7
Scottish Singles Sales (Official Charts)	23

== Release history ==
Region	Date	Format	Label
United Kingdom	4 December 2011	Digital Download	All Around the World
