= Albright =

Albright may refer to:

- Albright (surname)
- Albright, Alberta, Canada
- Albright, West Virginia, United States
- Albright College, a liberal arts college located in Reading, Pennsylvania, United States
- Albright–Knox Art Gallery, Buffalo, New York, United States
- Albright Memorial Building, Scranton, Pennsylvania, United States
- Albright special, a knot

== See also ==
- Allbright (disambiguation)
