= Kobi Onyame =

Scottish-Ghanaian hip-hop artist

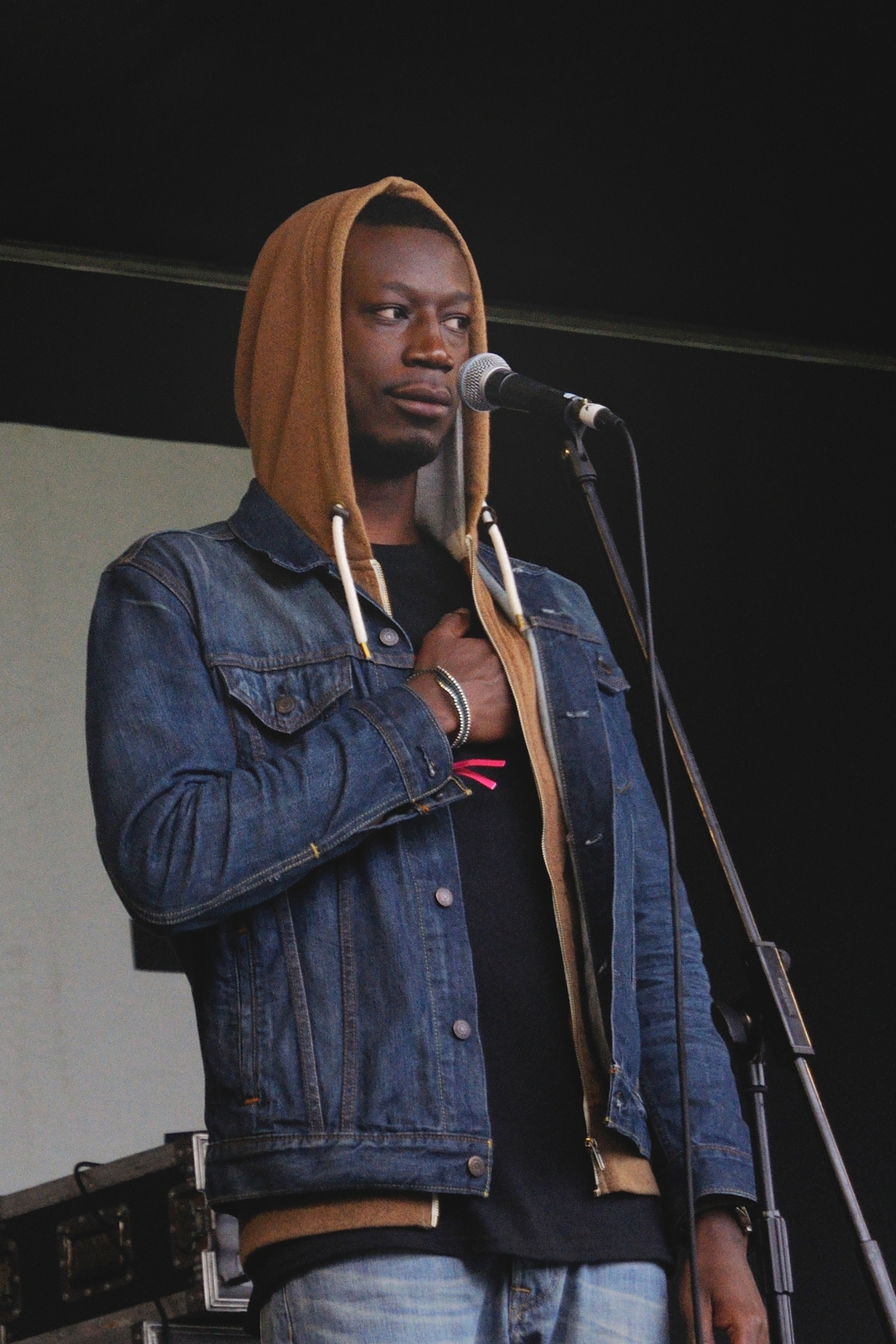
- Onyame onstage in 2014
- Born: Kyame Barfour-Osei; 3 July 1982 (age 44); Ghana
- Education: University of Strathclyde
- Style: Hip hop

Kwame Barfour-Osei, better known as Kobi Onyame, is an independent recording hip-hop artist, producer and songwriter based in the United Kingdom. His albums Gold and Don't Drink the Poison were shortlisted for the Scottish Album of the Year Award in 2018 and 2022 respectively.

== Biography ==
Onyame was born in Ghana and grew up in Accra. He then moved to the UK, living in London, later moving to Glasgow to study for his master's degree at the University of Strathclyde. His mother died in 2008. His work draws on his Ghanaian heritage, mixed with contemporary hip-hop. Early in his career, he released work under the name Jae P.

== Career ==
Onyame's fourth album Gold was nominated for the Scottish Album of the Year in 2018, where it was described as "an almost wistful echo of a yearning for home and originality that somehow has its roots in the past and present simultaneously." Following this nomination, he was the recipient of funding from the PRS Foundation, to support the recording of his next album. Along with C Duncan, Modern Studies, and Rod Jones, Onyame performed at the Live at the Longlist event where the 2019 Scottish Album of the Year award winner were announced.

In 2019, Onyame was one of 10 Scottish acts supported by Creative Scotland to perform at The Great Escape.

In 2020, Onyame founded Chosen Artists Management Ltd, a UK based Artist Management company that manages amongst others, Nigerian Alternative artist Tommy WÁ.

In 2021, Onyame released his fifth studio, Don't Drink the Poison. The ten-track album is self produced, with two tracks co-produced by Ghanaian musician Jayso and by Scottish musician Nathan Somevi. Don't Drink the Poison features guest appearances from new African artists including George Kalukusha from Malawi, SheSaidSo from South Africa and rapper Worlasi from Ghana. The album was shortlisted for the 2022 Scottish Album of the Year Award.

== Select discography ==
- Unsigned and Hungry, 2008 (released under the name Jae P)
- Green Green Grasses, 2011
- Glory, 2013
- Gold, 2017
- Don't Drink the Poison, 2021
