= Nate James =

English singer-songwriter (born 1979)

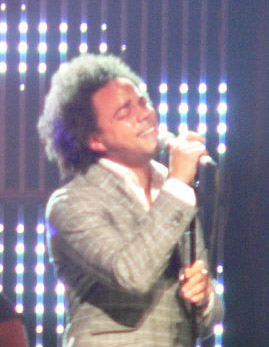
- James performing at the 2006 Digital Music Awards ceremony

Background information
- Born: Nathaniel James Speas; 15 September 1979 (age 46); Lakenheath, Suffolk, England
- Genres: Soul, R&B
- Years active: 2005–present
- Label: Frofunk

Nathaniel James Speas, known as Nate James, (born 15 September 1979 in Lakenheath, Suffolk, England) is an English singer-songwriter. James released his debut soul album Set the Tone in 2005 which won him two MOBO Nominations for Best Newcomer and Best R&B Artist, featuring his revered first release "Set The Tone" He released on his Frofunk imprint via Independent Labels around the world and became one of the most successful independent soul recording artists globally. James has sold over 1,000,000 albums and he has had airplay hits in both Europe and Japan.

He won the Festivalbar in 2006, which was an Italian summertime singing contest that took place in the most important Italian city squares such as the Piazza del Duomo in Milan. In 2007, James won the Urban Music Awards' Best Album (Kingdom Falls) and Best Neo-Soul Artist. In February 2008, James and his band performed on the BBC show Later... with Jools Holland. Nate was a contestant on the BBC's prime time television show The Voice UK in April 2013.

== Biography ==
=== Early life and music career ===
James has joint UK/US citizenship, having been born in 1979 on a U. S. Air Force base in England to an American father and English mother. He was signed as a songwriter by Universal Publishing 2004, prior to releasing material as a performer. He retained the copyright to his recordings and owns his music videos, and he has handled his own A&R, releasing music on his own Frofunk imprint through deals with Independent Labels around the world. James has sold over 1,000,000 albums and had airplay hits across mainland Europe and Japan. He appeared on The Voice UK on 27 April 2013, where two of the judges turned their chairs.

=== Set the Tone (2005–2007) ===
James released his debut album, Set The Tone in 2005 which is heavily influenced by soul artists such as Marvin Gaye, Prince and Stevie Wonder. It subsequently won James widespread critical acclaim and two MOBO nominations for Best Newcomer and Best R&B Artist. His album, written mostly by James, covers a range of music influences; from the bassy R&B of Set The Tone, the upbeat pop of Universal, the retro soul of The Message, the classic ballad sound of Justify Me to the rocky vibe in I'll Decline. There is also a duet with Dawn Robinson of En Vogue.

James has also worked with several noted co-writers that included David Brant (Mis-Teeq, Liberty X, Jamie Scott), Eg White (Adele's Chasing Pavements) on Universal, David Sneddon (Hurts, Lana Del Rey) and Jake Gosling (Ed Sheeran, Wiley (rapper)) on The Message, Andreas S. Jensen (Writer of Armand Van Heldens: MyMyMy), Peter-John Vettese (Annie Lennox: Walking On Broken Glass), Jamie Hartman (Will Young's All Time Love) on Justify Me and Emily Friendship (Sarah Connor's: You're the Kinda Man).

James has sold out numerous live shows at the Jazz Café in London and at other venues across the UK. His headline gig at Shepherd's Bush Empire had to be rescheduled due to the 7 July 2005 London bombings but went ahead in October 2005. Nate and his band also performed at Fruitstock 2005. He has had success in both Europe and Japan. He won the Festivalbar in Italy in 2006. The Festivalbar is an Italian singing competition that takes place in the most important Italian squares during summer, such as the Piazza del Duomo, Milan.

=== Kingdom Falls (2007–2008) ===
The recording of James' second album Kingdom Falls was entirely self-funded out of the profits from his debut album. The album features a live orchestra on many tracks and more studio-based production than that featured on his first album Set The Tone. The album title track Kingdom Falls was influenced by James's experiences on a charity mission to Rwanda in 2006, where he witnessed a mix of joy and sadness, seeing the country and its many orphans recovering from the atrocities committed during the genocide of 1994. The album was mixed in Los Angeles by grammy winning Outkast collaborator Neal H Pogue and was released first in Japan and subsequently in the UK & Italy. In 2007 James won Urban Music Awards Best Album (Kingdom Falls) and Best Neo-Soul Artist.

In February 2008 James and his band performed two tracks from the album on the BBC show Later... with Jools Holland – Choke and Back To You.

In Spring 2008, James embarked on his first tour of North America and played live shows in New York City, Toronto, San Diego, & Los Angeles. On 4 July 2008 James headlined the outdoor stage of the Montreal Jazz Fest, performing to an audience of over 120,000 in the Quebec city.

=== Revival (2009) ===
In between writing sessions for his next album, James recorded a selection of cover versions. These were released as Revival on 30 March 2009. The album was produced solely by the producer of James's Set The Tone album David Brant.

=== SugaSmak! (2010) ===
In 2010 James formed the group SugaSmak! which consisted of Nate as the lead vocalist (now dubbed 'SugaJack') and Matt Gooderson of indie outfit Infadels ('Clyma'). Boasting a new ElectroSoul sound, the duo's debut single We Are was released through the small London independent "Better Get Records" on 22 November 2010.

=== "Back Foot" (2012) ===
In 2012 Nate teamed up with Manchester duo HeavyFeet to record the hit single "Back Foot". The track was released through Champion Records on 25 March 2012.

=== The Voice UK (2013) ===
In 2013 Nate James appeared on UK hit TV show The Voice UK. Performing "Crazy", James turned Jessie J and Danny O'Donoghue's chairs. He chose Jessie J as his coach, although he did consider being on Team will.i.am. He was eliminated during The Battle Rounds.

=== The Voice of Holland (2018) ===
In 2018, James appeared on the Netherlands hit TV show The Voice of Holland, where he performed "Issues" and turned all four chairs. He chose Waylon to be his coach.

== Discography ==
=== Albums ===
Title	Album details	Peak chart positions					Certifications (sales thresholds)
Title	Album details	UK	UK Indie	UK R&B	FRA	ITA	Certifications (sales thresholds)
Set the Tone	Release Date: 8 August 2005; Label: Universal Music	96	33	39	68	43	IMPALA Sales Certification: Gold (30,000); Worldwide sales: 125,000
Kingdom Falls	Release Date: 18 June 2007	—	—	—	—	—	
Revival	Release Date: 30 March 2009	—	—	—	—	—	

=== EPs ===
- 2007: Funkdefining EP

=== Singles ===
==== As solo artist ====
Title	Year	Peak chart positions				Album
Title	Year	UK	BEL (VL)	FRA	ITA	Album
"Set the Tone"	2005	69	—	—	—	Set the Tone
"Universal"	2005	72	—	—	—	Set the Tone
"The Message" / "Get This Right"	2005	—	9	46	28	Set the Tone
"Pretend" (Download-only single, packaged with B-side "Cut a Rug")	2006	—	—	—	—	Set the Tone
"Justify Me"	2006	—	21	—	41	Set the Tone
"Back to You"	2007	—	—	—	49	Kingdom Falls
"Kingdom Falls"	2007	—	—	—	—	Kingdom Falls
"High Times"	2007	—	—	—	—	Kingdom Falls
"Choke" / "Back to You"	2008	—	—	—	—	Kingdom Falls
"Because I Love You"	2009	—	—	—	—	Revival

==== With SugaSmack! ====
- "We Are" (2010)

==== With Heavyfeet ====
- "Back Foot" (2012)

=== Collaborations ===
- 2005: Poker Pets featuring Nate James - "Lovin' You" No. 43 (UK)
- 2005: Natalie Williams featuring Nate James - "Conversation"
- 2006: Sway feat. Nate James "Still on My Own"
- 2006: Pe'z v Nate James – "Live for the Groove EP" Top 40 (JAP sales chart)
- 2007: Paolo Meneguzzi & Nate James 'Music' / 'Musica' Top 30 (Italia Airplay)
- 2012: HeavyFeet & Nate James – "Back Foot"
- 2024: John Galea & Nate James – "Old School Love"

=== Also features on ===
- 2004: Shapeshifters "Lola's Theme" No. 1 (UK single)
- "Funkdefining" is featured in the Hollywood movies Run, Fat Boy, Run and How to Lose Friends & Alienate People

=== Accolades ===
- 2005: MOBO AWARD Best Newcomer nominee
- 2005: MOBO AWARD Best R&B Artist nominee
- 2005: CHANNEL U Best of British nominee
- 2005: SCREEN NATION AWARDS Best Video nominee
- 2006: MOBO AWARD Best UK Male nominee
- 2006: BT DIGITAL MUSIC AWARDS Best Urban Artist
- 2006: FESTIVALBAR Best International Artist winner
- 2007: URBAN MUSIC AWARDS Best Album (Kingdom Falls)
- 2007: URBAN MUSIC AWARDS Best Neo-Soul Artist winner
