= Set the Tone (Nate James album) =

Studio album by Nate James
- Released: 8 August 2005
- Genre: Soul; R&B
- Label: Universal
- Producer: David Brant; Jaz Rogers; Shux; Peter-John Vettese; Eg White

Singles from Set the Tone
- 1. "Set the Tone" Released: 2005; 2. "Universal" Released: 2005; 3. "The Message" / "Get This Right" Released: 2005; 4. "Pretend" Released: 2006; 5. "Justify Me" Released: 2006

Set the Tone is the debut studio album by American-British soul singer Nate James, released on 8 August 2005, by Universal Music Group.

== Critical reception ==
Professional ratings
Review scores
Source	Rating
The Independent	3/5 stars

Reception to the album was largely mixed. Andy Gill of The Independent rated the album three stars out of five, appreciating its modern R&B style that echoes 1970s funk. He notes that the album's sound is reminiscent of Stevie Wonder's work, although it lacks meaningful messages, focusing instead on typical themes of dancing and romantic skirmishes. Though he found the album "slick" and "engaging", he felt that it failed to present "big ideas that move hearts and minds."

Tony Heywood of MusicOMH felt that the album fell short of delivering authentic soul music, arguing that James's rural background disconnects him from the urban experiences and political issues essential to the genre. He described the album as "watered down Jamiroquai, third-hand Stevie Wonder, completely anonymous flat pack soul", and felt that it lacks wit, boldness, and passion. Heywood described the album as "crushingly dull" and compared it unfavorably to other British artists such as Justin Timberlake, Craig David, Roots Manuva, and Dizzee Rascal.

== Track listing ==
Set the Tone – Standard version
No.	Title	Writer(s)	Producer(s)	Length
1.	"Said I'd Show You"	Andreas S. Jensen; Nate James	Peter-John Vettese	4:34
2.	"The Message"	James; David Sneddon; Jake Gosling; James Mein	Vettese	3:22
3.	"Get This Right"	James, Peter Martin	Vettese	3:56
4.	"Pretend"	Colin Emmanuel; James	Jaz Rogers	4:24
5.	"Universal"	Eg White; James	White	3:38
6.	"Set the Tone"	David Brant; Dawn Joseph; James	Brant	3:31
7.	"Funky Love" (featuring Carmen Reece)	Alan Glass; Brant; James	Brant	4:05
8.	"Justify Me"	Jamie Hartman; Ryan Shaw	Vettese	3:41
9.	"I Don't Wanna Fight"	Brant; James	Brant	3:49
10.	"I'll Decline" (featuring Dawn Robinson)	James; Brant; Dawn Joseph; Robinson	Vettese	3:40
11.	"Impossible"	Brant; James; Ron St. Louis	Brant	3:27
12.	"Can't Stop"	Emmanuel; Jamesh	Brant	3:49
13.	"Shake Out"	James; Vettese	Vettese	5:39
14.	"Still On My Own" (Sway featuring Nate James)	Sway	Shux	3:50

== Charts ==
Chart performance for Set the Tone
Chart (2005)	Peak position
French Albums (SNEP)	68
Italian Albums (FIMI)	43
UK Albums (OCC)	96
UK Independent Albums (OCC)	33
UK R&B Albums (OCC)	39

== Release history ==
List of release dates, showing region, formats, editions, and label
Region	Date	Format(s)	Edition(s)	Label
United Kingdom	8 August 2005	CD; digital download	Standard edition	Island Records
Japan	13 February 2006	CD; digital download	Standard edition	Island Records
United Kingdom	12 June 2006	CD; digital download	Reissue	Island Records
