= Sexy Dirty Love =

Promotional single by Demi Lovato

from the album Tell Me You Love Me
- Released: September 22, 2017
- Recorded: 2017
- Studio: SuCasa Recording (Los Angeles)
- Genre: Nu-disco
- Length: 3:33
- Label: Hollywood; Island; Safehouse
- Songwriters: Demi Lovato; Warren "Oak" Felder; Trevor Brown; William Zaire Simmons
- Producers: Warren "Oak" Felder; Trevor Brown; Zaire Koalo

"Sexy Dirty Love" is a song recorded by American singer Demi Lovato for her sixth studio album, Tell Me You Love Me (2017). It was released on September 22, 2017, by Hollywood, Island and Safehouse Records as the third promotional single from the record, following "Tell Me You Love Me" and "You Don't Do It for Me Anymore". "Sexy Dirty Love" is featured on the set list of Lovato's 2018 Tell Me You Love Me World Tour.

== Production ==
"Sexy Dirty Love" was written by Demi Lovato, Warren "Oak" Felder, Trevor Brown and William Zaire Simmons for Lovato's sixth studio album, Tell Me You Love Me. The production was handled by Oak with co-production by "Downtown" Trevor Brown and Zaire Koalo. The track was recorded with guidance by Oak in SuCasa Recording, located in Los Angeles. Keith "Daquan" Sorrells assisted the engineering. Erik Madrid mixed the track, assisted by Alex Spencer. The mastering was done by Chris Gehringer and Will Quinnell at Sterling Sound Studios. All three co-writers also provided background vocals. Felder also performed the keyboards and also did the arrangement. Felder and Brown programmed the synthesizers, while Koalo programmed the drums.

In an interview with NPR, Lovato revealed who she was writing the song for:

I was writing this song for somebody that I was really interested in — somebody that I had been talking to, that I had a crush on. And, you know, when you go into the studio, you feel very inspired by the things that are happening in your daily life and this was where I was at. I was feeling confident, feeling sexy and I wanted to write a song about it.

== Release ==
The track was released as the third promotional single from Tell Me You Love Me on September 22, 2017. The song sold 8,486 copies in the US in its first week of release.

== Composition ==
Exhibiting influences from 1980s and 1990s musical styles, "Sexy Dirty Love" is a "funky" nu-disco track that has an uptempo danceable rhythm and contains elements of "old-school" R&B and electro genres. Due to its sonority, Mike Wass from Idolator associated the track with Justin Timberlake's FutureSex/LoveSounds album. The reviewer also pointed out that the song "feels like a bolder, more adventurous take on 'Sorry Not Sorry'". Lyrically, it narrates a thoroughly modern romantic encounter initiated via web with Lovato singing about fantasy through the phone in the first verse. According to Lovato, the song is about the beginning of a relationship where everything is sexy and exciting.

== Credits and personnel ==
Credits were adapted from the liner notes of Tell Me You Love Me.

Recording and management

- Recorded at SuCasa Recording (Los Angeles)
- Mixed at Sonic Element Studios (Los Angeles)
- Mastered at Sterling Sound Studios (New York City)
- Published by DDLovato Music/Universal Music Corp. (ASCAP), Sony/ATV (BMI), Trevor Brown Publishing Designee (ASCAP) and Quest Da Stars (ASCAP)

Personnel

- Demi Lovato – lead vocals, composition
- Warren "Oak" Felder – composition, production, background vocals, recording, keyboards, keyboard arrangement, synthesizer programming
- "Downtown" Trevor Brown – composition, co-production, background vocals, synthesizer programming
- Zaire Koalo – composition, co-production, background vocals, drum programming
- Keith "Daquan" Sorrells – engineering assistance
- Erik Madrid – mixing
- Alex Spencer – mixing assistance
- Chris Gehringer – mastering
- Will Quinnell – mastering

== Charts ==
Chart (2017)	Peak position
New Zealand Heatseekers (RMNZ)	7
