= Confident (Demi Lovato song) =

2015 single by Demi Lovato

Single by Demi Lovato

from the album Confident
- Released: September 18, 2015
- Studio: MXM (Los Angeles); Wolf Cousins (Stockholm)
- Genre: Electropop; Pop rock
- Length: 3:25
- Label: Hollywood; Island; Republic; Safehouse
- Songwriters: Demi Lovato; Ilya Salmanzadeh; Max Martin; Savan Kotecha
- Producers: Max Martin; Ilya

Demi Lovato singles chronology
"Cool for the Summer" (2015)	"Confident" (2015)	"Irresistible" (2015)

Music video
- "Confident" on YouTube

"Confident" is a song by American singer Demi Lovato. It was released on September 18, 2015, by Hollywood and Island Records as the second single from her fifth studio album of the same name (2015). Lovato co-wrote the song with Savan Kotecha and its producers Max Martin and Ilya Salmanzadeh. Commercially, it reached number one in Israel and the top 30 in Canada, the Czech Republic, New Zealand, Scotland, and the United States. The song has been certified quintuple platinum by the Recording Industry Association of America (RIAA).

Musically, "Confident" is an electropop and pop rock song with heavy drums, hooker trumpet and finger snaps. Lyrically, the song discusses self-empowerment and confidence. The music video for "Confident" was released on October 9, 2015, to Lovato's Vevo channel. It was directed by Robert Rodriguez, and features guest appearances from Michelle Rodriguez, Jeff Fahey, Zane Holtz, and Marko Zaror. Lovato has performed the song on Saturday Night Live, Good Morning America, the 2015 American Music Awards, and several TV programs. A re-recorded rock version of the song was released on August 18, 2023, and was included on her remix album Revamped (2023).

== Recording and release ==
Lovato co-wrote "Confident" with Ilya Salmanzadeh and the song's producers Max Martin and Savan Kotecha. The song was recorded in two studios: MXM Studios, Los Angeles in United States and Wolf Cousins Studios, Stockholm in Sweden. Sam Holland engineered the song, Serban Ghenea handled the mixing of the song. Ilya Salmanzadeh performed guitar, bass, keyboards, percussion among with of Max Martin, the musician Rickard Göransson also performed the percussion, Savan Kotecha also contributed with the background vocals with Salmanzadeh and Oscar Holter. The horn arrangement was provided by musician Jonas Thander who also performed the saxophone, the trombone was played by Steffan Findin, while the trumpets were performed by Stefan Persson and Karl Olandersson. Other personnel included Peter Carlsson who performed the live drums.

Prior to official release, "Confident" leaked online on August 24, 2015. On August 27, 2015, Lovato revealed the cover, title, release date and tracklist of her fifth studio album Confident on Twitter. Following the announcement of the album's release, Lovato stated the title track was "really the best way to represent me today", adding that "I feel very secure in who I am as an artist and a person. That's what I'm trying to portray." Lovato told MTV that the song influenced in the choice of album's title: "It definitely was kind of a no-brainer when we called it Confident," she said, "also one of the songs on the album is called Confident.' Whenever I make an album and try to think of a name, I always look to the track list and what song represents this album the most. The song was officially released on September 18, 2015, and included as an instant gratification track to accompany digital pre-orders of the album through Apple Music. Lovato debuted "Confident" on Apple Music's Beats 1 during an interview with Pete Wentz. On August 18, 2023, a rock re-recording titled "Confident (Rock Version)" was released and included on her remix album Revamped.

== Composition ==
Musically, "Confident" is a "drum-line driven" pop, electropop and pop rock song about empowerment and confidence. According to Universal Music Publishing's official digital sheet music on Musicnotes.com, the song is set in compound quadruple meter (12/8 time) with a tempo of 130 beats per minute. It is set in the key of E♭ minor and Lovato's vocal range spans from the low note of E♭_{3} to the high note of B♭_{5}. The song features a drumbeat and Lovato asking "What's wrong with being confident?" along with finger snaps. Lovato sings in the second pre-chorus: "So you say I'm complicated / But you had me underrated", following of the chorus. Critics noted that the song beat is reminiscent of Depeche Mode's 1989 song "Personal Jesus".

== Critical reception ==
Digital Spy reviewed the song positively, saying that "The track is a strutting, brass-laden pop anthem, which hears her take full control." Music Times also reviewed the song positively, saying "'Confident' shows a sassy, sexy side of Lovato. With rounds of thunderous drums and honks of brass horns, 'Confident' is all new Demi, with no signs of heartbreak or struggle in sight." Nick Levine from the site NME wrote that the song "fuses hip-hop horns and Joan Jett beats and has her bragging 'it's all about me tonight'". Glenn Ganboa from Newsday in review for the album, said: "The title cut has the feel of a Britney Spears track musically -- perhaps producer Max Martin has something to do with that -- but its feminist lyrics take the song to the next level. Reviewing the album, Annie Zaleski of The A.V. Club called the song a "saucy, self-centered track." The reviewer also commented positively about the song, describing it as a "galloping, horn-plastered title track. Billboard and American Songwriter ranked the song number three and number four, respectively, on their lists of the 10 greatest Demi Lovato songs.

== Chart performance ==
"Confident" debuted at number 84 on the US Billboard Hot 100 issued for October 10, 2015. After the release of the music video, the song re-entered on the chart at number 58 on the chart of October 31, 2015. In the next week, after Lovato's performance of the song with a melody with "Cool for the Summer" on Saturday Night Live, "Confident" climbed from number 58 to number 31, prompted by a 127% increase in sales (48,000 downloads sold) and a 43% increase to US streams (4.3 million streams), winning a Streaming Gainer honor that week. Following Lovato's performance of the song at the 2015 American Music Awards on November 22, 2015, the song rose from number 36 to number 28, selling 50,000 copies(+71% in sales from last week) on the week end of December 12, 2015. For the week ending December 19, 2015, "Confident" rose from the number 28 to number 21 on the chart (its peak position). It has sold over five million units in the United States, being certified quintuple platinum by the Recording Industry Association of America (RIAA).

The song reached number 37 in Canada. On March 10, 2016, "Confident" received the certification of platinum on the country for sales of 80,000 copies. In Australia, "Confident" debuted at number 35 on the Australian Singles Chart for the week ending November 1, 2015. The following week, it fell off the chart. In the United Kingdom, the song debuted at number 65 on the UK Singles Chart. "Confident" initially entered the Irish Singles Chart at number 68 on the chart issued for October 22, 2015. The following week the song climbed seven positions and peaked number 61 on the country. Elsewhere, "Confident" attained peaks of number 27 in Scotland, number 23 in Slovakia, number 55 in the Netherlands. and number 27 in New Zealand.

== Music video ==
=== Background and development ===
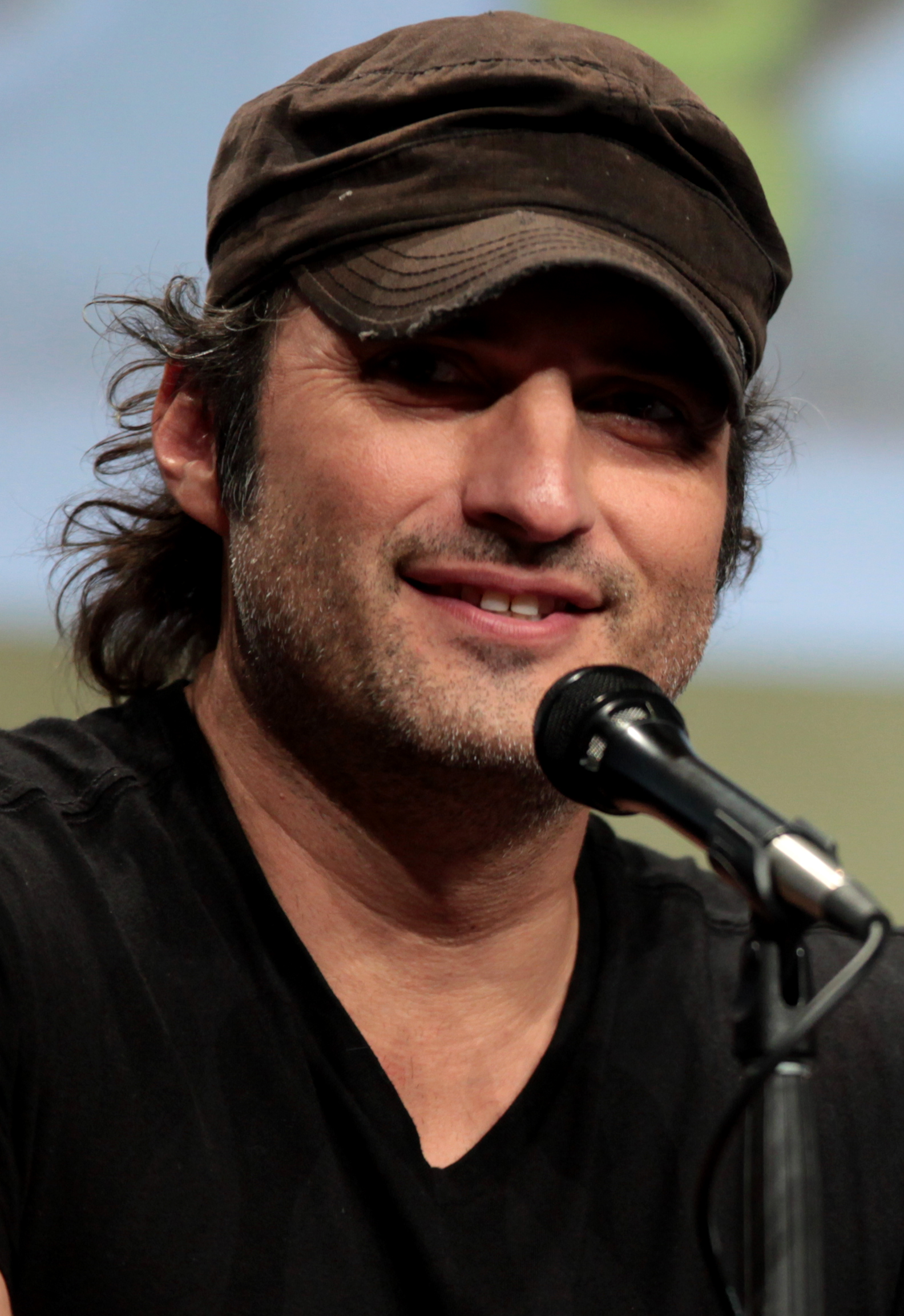
Robert Rodriguez directed the song's music video.

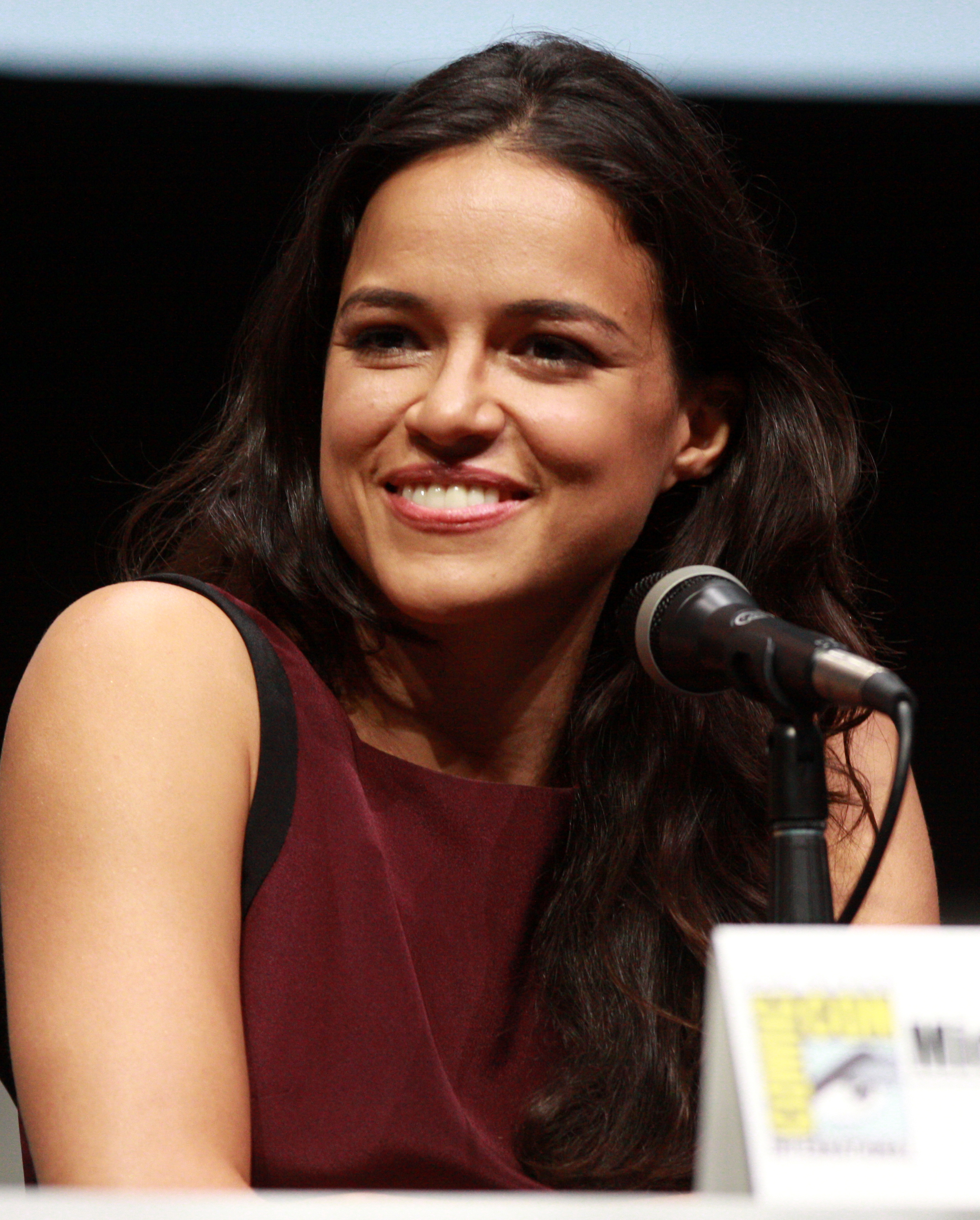
The video features Michelle Rodriguez.

Released on October 9, 2015, through Lovato's Vevo channel, the music video for "Confident" was directed by Robert Rodriguez, stars Lovato along with Michelle Rodriguez, Jeff Fahey, Zane Holtz and Marko Zaror, and was shot at Troublemaker Studios in Austin, Texas. Lovato had asked Robert Rodriguez to direct the music video after meeting him through her role as Maia in From Dusk till Dawn: The Series. Speaking to MTV, the director said: "We have created our own method, our own way of making movies. So whenever I am going to do a project, and especially something I really care about, I have to do it here."

The director also explained that he imagined the video while listening to the song: "When I got the music and I heard it, it was so epic and cinematic. It sounded so much like a movie score. It had so much energy, I had to call [Lovato] and find out how she came up with it. She said that she wanted to put more of a rock influence into some of the songs in the album; that was totally up my alley." In a behind the scenes interview, Michelle Rodriguez said: "The song is so cool, I love the message behind it, about the girls believing in themselves." She also commented about her participation on the video: "What really caught my attention was the bonding of girls who were hating on each other, and then all of a sudden join forces." Robert also stated to MTV:

"I wanted it to look like a movie, not like a vamped up, over-the-top music video or a movie in a video, but actually something that looked like it was from a spy film. I felt it was this great culmination of movie, ideas and visuals all put together into this song created by Demi Lovato."

=== Synopsis ===
The video starts with Lovato in a maximum security prison where she is offered a pardon by a US marshal (Fahey) for the capture of Michelle Rodriguez's character. Sent to apprehend her, Lovato soon realizes that Rodriguez is actually in league with the marshal and that Lovato is the one being set up for treason. As the police attempt to take Lovato back to prison, she fights back and attempts to stop Rodriguez. Rodriguez overpowers her and she is taken captive by the police in a prison bus. However, Lovato knocks her captors unconscious, breaks free and jumps into Rodriguez's trailing car. A fistfight ensues before the pair realize that they were both played (and branded) by the marshal. They then team up to apprehend the marshal, who is later arrested by the police. Lovato and Rodriguez then bid farewell and leave on their motorcycles.

=== Credits and personnel ===
Credits adapted from YouTube

- Robert Rodriguez - director and producer
- Cecilia Conti - producer
- Brian Bettwy - first assistant director
- Steve Joyner - production assistant
- Nina Proctor - costumes
- Jeff Dashnaw - stunts
- Todd Smiley - gaffer
- Kurt Volk - graphics

== Live performances ==
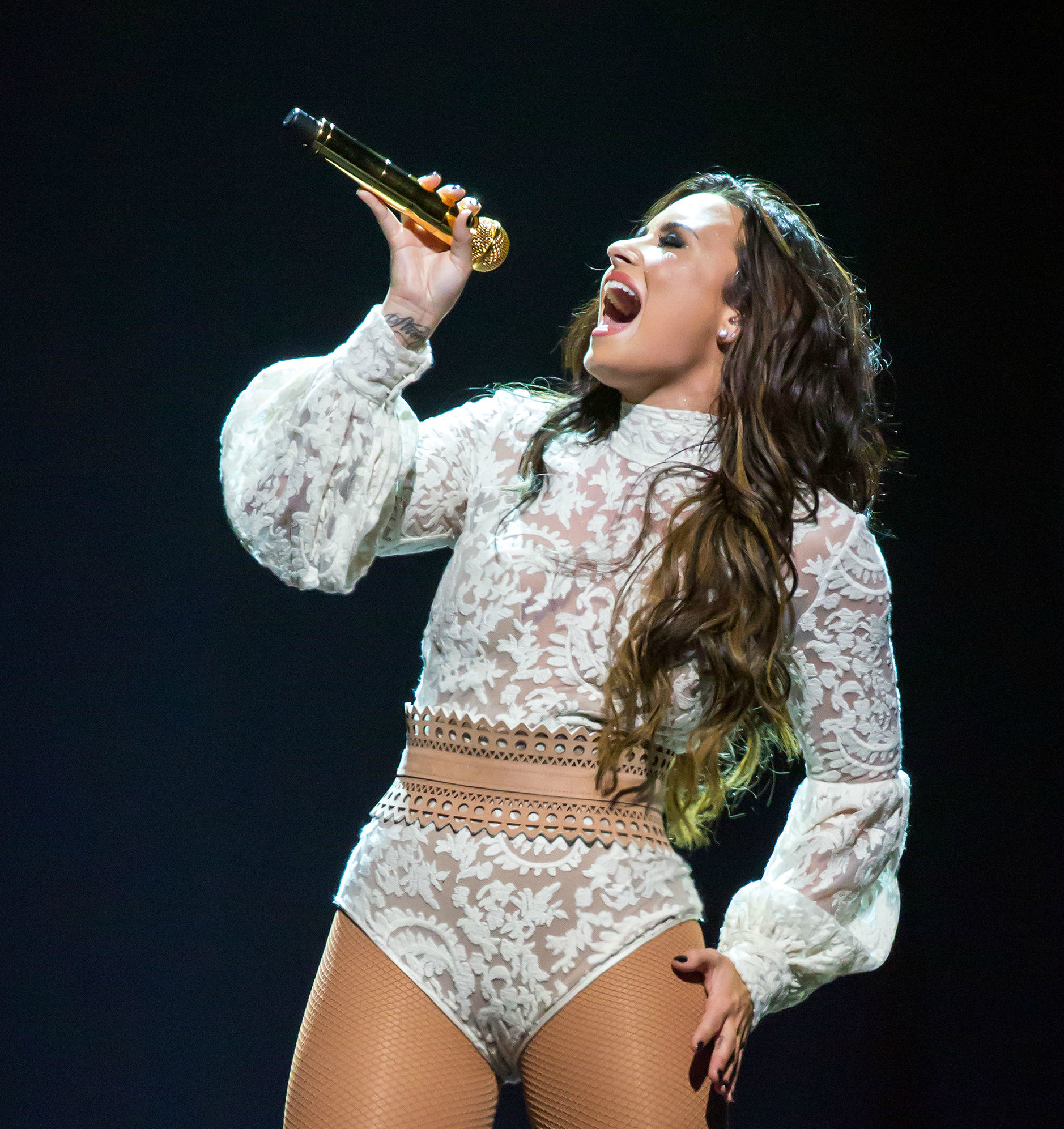
Lovato performing "Confident" during the opening of the Future Now Tour at AT&T Center in San Antonio, Texas. The song served as the opening track of Lovato's solo set list during the tour.

Lovato first performed the "Confident" single at a gay bar in New York City on October 15, 2015. To celebrate the release of her fifth album Confident, Lovato surprised her fans the next day with an acoustic performance of the title track in Times Square. On October 17, 2015, Lovato performed a "Cool for the Summer" and "Confident" medley on Saturday Night Live during the series' forty-first season. Lovato also performed the song on Good Morning America on October 29, 2015, and on The Tonight Show the following day. On November 6, 2015, she performed "Confident" on Idol. Furthermore, Lovato performed the song at the 2015 BBC Radio 1's Teen Awards on November 8, 2015. On November 14, 2015, "Confident" was a part of Lovato's setlist at the 2015 106.1 KISS FM Fall Ball. Lovato later performed the song at the 2015 American Music Awards on November 22, 2015 and included it in her setlist during the 2015 Jingle Ball Tour.

As one of the headliners of Dick Clark's New Year's Rockin' Eve, she performed a medley of "Cool for the Summer" and "Confident" again in Times Square on December 31, 2015. On March 3, 2016, Lovato performed the song on American Idol with the top 8 contestants of the series' final season. Another rendition of the song was given on the second edition of the Victoria's Secret Swim Special, which aired on March 9, 2016. Lovato opened the 2016 edition of Wango Tango with a performance of "Confident" on May 14, 2016. She later performed the song on The Late Late Show with James Corden, during the Carpool Karaoke segment, which appeared online on May 16, 2016. On July 25, 2016, Lovato performed the song at the 2016 Democratic National Convention in support of Hillary Clinton. On September 6, 2016, the singer performed "Confident" and "Body Say" at the Made for History fashion fundraiser hosted by Anna Wintour for Clinton. "Confident" was included in Lovato's setlist for the Future Now Tour. Lovato performed the track during her sixth headlining concert tour Tell Me You Love Me World Tour.

== Track listing ==
- Digital download
1. "Confident" – 3:25
2. "Confident" (The Alias Remix) – 5:08
- Digital remixes – EP
1. "Confident" (The Alias Remix) – 5:08
2. "Confident" (VARA Remix) – 3:38
3. "Confident" (Gianni Kosta Remix) – 3:48
4. "Confident" (Volkoder Remix) – 5:17
5. "Confident" (DJ Lynnwood Remix) – 4:30

== Credits and personnel ==
Recording

- Recorded at MXM Studios, Los Angeles, United States and Wolf Cousins Studios, Stockholm, Sweden
- Mixed at MixStar Studios, Virginia Beach, United States
- Mastered at Sterling Sound, New York City, United States

Management

- Published by MXM (ASCAP)
- All rights administered by Kobalt Songs Music Publishing (ASCAP), WB Music Corp. (ASCAP), Wolf Cousins (STIM), Warner/Chappell Music SCAND (STIM) and Ddlovato Music (ASCAP)

Personnel

- Demi Lovato – lead vocals, songwriter
- Savan Kotecha – songwriter, background vocals
- Max Martin – songwriter, drums, producer, keys, programming, percussion
- Ilya Salmanzadeh – songwriter, producer, guitar, bass, keys, programming, percussion, background vocals
- Jonas Thander – horn arrangement, saxophone
- Steffan Findin – trombone
- Stefan Persson – trumpets
- Karl Olandersson – trumpets
- Peter Carlsson – live drums
- Rickard Göransson – percussion
- Oscar Holter – background vocals
- Sam Holland – engineering
- Serban Ghenea – mixing
- Tom Coyne – mastering

Credits adapted from the liner notes of Confident.

== Charts ==
=== Weekly charts ===
Chart (2015–16)	Peak position
Australia (ARIA)	35
Belgium (Ultratip Bubbling Under Flanders)	27
Canada Hot 100 (Billboard)	26
Canada AC (Billboard)	37
Canada CHR/Top 40 (Billboard)	10
Canada Hot AC (Billboard)	23
CIS Airplay (TopHit)	195
Czech Republic Singles Digital (ČNS IFPI)	18
France (SNEP)	104
Hungary (Stream Top 40)	32
Ireland (IRMA)	61
Israel (Media Forest TV Airplay)	1
Italy (FIMI)	84
Netherlands (Single Top 100)	55
New Zealand (Recorded Music NZ)	27
Norway (VG-lista)	40
Portugal (AFP)	77
Scottish Singles Sales (Official Charts)	27
Slovakia Singles Digital (ČNS IFPI)	23
Sweden (Sverigetopplistan)	67
UK Singles (Official Charts)	65
US Billboard Hot 100	21
US Adult Contemporary (Billboard)	26
US Adult Pop Airplay (Billboard)	15
US Dance Airplay (Billboard)	27
US Dance Club Songs (Billboard)	1
US Pop Airplay (Billboard)	9

=== Year-end charts ===
Chart (2016)	Position
US Dance Club Songs (Billboard)	46

== Certifications ==
Region	Certification	Certified units/sales
Australia (ARIA)	3× Platinum	210,000^{‡}
Brazil (Pro-Música Brasil)	Diamond	250,000^{‡}
Canada (Music Canada)	Platinum	80,000^{*}
Denmark (IFPI Danmark)	Gold	45,000^{‡}
New Zealand (RMNZ)	2× Platinum	60,000^{‡}
Poland (ZPAV)	Platinum	50,000^{‡}
Portugal (AFP)	Gold	10,000^{‡}
United Kingdom (BPI)	Platinum	600,000^{‡}
United States (RIAA)	5× Platinum	5,000,000^{‡}
Streaming
Sweden (GLF)	Gold	4,000,000^{†}
^{*} Sales figures based on certification alone.^{‡} Sales+streaming figures based on certification alone.^{†} Streaming-only figures based on certification alone.

== "Confident" (rock version) ==
"Confident" (rock version)

Promotional single by Demi Lovato

from the album Revamped
- Released: August 18, 2023
- Studio: SuCasa (Los Angeles, CA)
- Genre: Glam rock
- Length: 3:25
- Label: DLG Recordings, LLC; Island
- Songwriters: Demi Lovato; Ilya Salmanzadeh; Max Martin; Savan Kotecha
- Producers: Felder; Alex Niceforo; Keith Sorrells

Lyric video
- "Confident (rock version) on YouTube

In January 2022, Lovato held a "funeral" for her pop music ahead of the release of her eighth studio album Holy Fvck in August of that year. The album, which embraced a heavier rock sound that departed from the pop sound of Lovato's previous releases, was supported by the Holy Fvck Tour. The setlist included several rock versions of her older pop songs, including "Confident".

On March 24, 2023, Lovato released a rock version of her pop song "Heart Attack" to mark the song's 10th anniversary. On May 18, she announced via social media that she would release a rock version of "Cool for the Summer", which was released a week after. "a rock version of her pop song "Sorry Not Sorry"", which featured a guitar solo from British-American musician Slash, was announced on July 10 and released four days after. Confident (Rock Version) was released on August 18, 2023.

== See also ==
- List of number-one dance singles of 2015 (U.S.)
