= Daddy Issues (Demi Lovato song) =

Song by Demi Lovato

from the album Tell Me You Love Me
- Released: September 29, 2017
- Studio: SuCasa Studios (Los Angeles)
- Genre: Electropop
- Length: 3:09
- Label: Island; Hollywood; Safehouse
- Songwriter(s): Demi Lovato; Sean Douglas; Warren "Oak" Felder; William Zaire Simmons
- Producer(s): Felder; Zaire Koalo (co.)

"Daddy Issues" is a song recorded by American singer-songwriter Demi Lovato. It was included as the fifth track on her sixth studio album Tell Me You Love Me (2017), released through Island, Hollywood, and Safehouse Records on September 29, 2017. Lovato co-wrote the song along with Sean Douglas and its producers Warren "Oak" Felder and William Zaire Simmons. "Daddy Issues" was featured on the set list of Lovato's 2018 Tell Me You Love Me World Tour.

== Background ==
Following the release of her fifth studio album Confident in October 2015, Lovato told Latina that her follow-up album would have a "more soulful vibe". In October 2016, she announced via Twitter that she would be taking a break from music and the spotlight in 2017, stating "I'm not meant for this business or the media". However, she revealed to Mike Adam in August 2017 that after doing charity work earlier that year, she felt rejuvenated and started creating music again, which eventually led to an album. The singer mentioned that a title and release date had been chosen, but she was not allowed to disclose them at the time.

In an interview with Elvis Duran during his morning radio program in August 2017, Lovato revealed that the track would be on its parent album, Tell Me You Love Me. During the production of the album, Lovato along with the producers built up concepts of tracks based on their titles. Lovato got the idea of penning a track called "Daddy Issues" when she was in a car to the studio.

== Composition ==
"Daddy Issues" sees Lovato singing about a torrid affair with an older man explaining that she has some issues and certain behaviors caused by her relationship with her father. In an interview with BBC News, the singer confessed that the lyrics were ones she came up with, based on her own experiences. Regarding to its lyrics, Alexa Camp of Slant Magazine described the track was "filled with one eyebrow-raising lyric after the next". Mike Nied from Idolator observed that in the track Lovato "is hooked on some good loving, and she is content to keep things casual." Its electropop and synthpop production contains heavy stuttering synth drops and keyboard effects.

Upon reviewing Tell Me You Love Me, Stephen Thomas Erlewine of AllMusic noted differences between the track to the overall album regarding its subtlety musically, "Subtle the words are not, and while the music occasionally matches this braggadocio. [...] [The track] blusters with its stuttering synth drops," he added.

== Critical reception ==
Billboard listed "Daddy Issues" at number sixty for their 100 Best Songs of 2017, called it as a highlight of the album and described it as "all mysterious and smoky in the verses before exploding into a whopper of a chorus that stings and stabs". Upon reviewing its parent album, Mikael Wood of Los Angeles Times described the track as "unapologetically twisted", compared it to the lead single "Sorry Not Sorry" as "catchy and funny and sexy and daring". Jamieson Cox of Pitchfork compared the track to previous other recordings Lovato wrote about the relationship with her birth father, describing it as "remarkably frothy".

== Live performances ==
"Daddy Issues" was featured on the set list of Lovato's 2018 Tell Me You Love Me World Tour, preceded by an interlude which featured the singer portraying both mental health professional and patient. She then performed on stage laying on a psychiatrist couch in a black leather bodysuit and thigh-high pointed boots.

== Credits and personnel ==
Recording and management

- Recorded at SuCasa Studios (Los Angeles, California)
- Mixed at Hercules Studios (Sydney, Australia)
- Mastered at Sterling Sound Studios (New York City)
- Published by DDLovato Music/Universal Music Corp. (ASCAP), Sony/ATV (BMI), Quest Da Stars (ASCAP), and Sony/ATV (BMI)

Personnel

- Demi Lovato – lead vocals, composition
- Oak Felder – composition, production, recording engineering, acoustic guitar, synthesizer programming
- William Zaire "Koalo" Simmons – composition, co-production, drum programming
- Sean Douglas – composition
- Keith "Daquan" Sorrells – engineering assistance
- Eric J Dubowsky – mixing
- Tim Watt – mix assistance
- Chris Gehringer – mastering
- Will Quinnell – mastering

Credits adapted from the liner notes of Tell Me You Love Me.
