= You Don't Do It for Me Anymore =

Promotional single by Demi Lovato

from the album Tell Me You Love Me
- Released: September 8, 2017
- Recorded: 2017
- Studio: Big Noize Studios (Hollywood Hills); Westlake Recording Studios (Los Angeles)
- Length: 3:17
- Label: Hollywood; Island; Safehouse
- Composers: Demi Lovato; Gladius; Ashlyn Wilson
- Lyricists: Demi Lovato; Chloe Angelides
- Producers: Jonas Jeberg; Gladius

"You Don't Do It for Me Anymore" is a song by American singer Demi Lovato for her sixth studio album, Tell Me You Love Me (2017). It was released on September 8, 2017, by Hollywood, Island and Safehouse Records as the second promotional single from the record, following "Tell Me You Love Me". The song's lyrics were written by Lovato and Chloe Angelides. It was produced by James "Gladius" Wong, Jonas Jeberg, Anton Kuhl serving as an additional producer, Mitch Allan as a vocal producer, and Scott Robinson as an additional vocal producer. "You Don't Do It For Me Anymore" can be interpreted as a breakup song, but for Lovato the song talks about her previous alcohol and drug addiction.

== Production ==
"You Don't Do It for Me Anymore" was written by Demi Lovato, Jonas Jeberg, Chloe Angelides, Ashlyn Wilson and James "Gladius" Wong. The track was produced by Jeberg. He also performed all the instruments. Anton Kuhl contributed as the additional producer. Mitch Allan also served as the song's vocal producer, alongside additional vocal producing by Scott Robinson. The track was recorded by Jeberg at the Big Noize Studio, located in Hollywood Hills. Lovato recorded the vocals with guidance by Jose Balaguer and was assisted by Nicole "Coco" Llorens at Westlake Recording Studios in Los Angeles. The track was eventually mixed by Eric Madrid, assisted by Alex Spencer. The track was finally mastered by Chris Gehringer and Will Quinnell.

During the album pop-up exhibition, Lovato said about the song,

Everyone relates to this song differently, and that's the beauty of music. You're allowed to connect with a song in the way that you choose. For some people this song is about the end of a relationship, but for me, it's a goodbye letter to my old self and some of my destructive behaviors. So it's deeply personal.

== Release ==
In June 2017, Lovato shared a snippet of herself recording the track in an Instagram story. The track was released as the second promotional single from Tell Me You Love Me on September 8, 2017. The track sold 12,757 copies in its first week of release.

== Composition ==
Composed in a compound time signature, "You Don't Do It For Me Anymore" features a slow tempo subdued beat and strings chords. During the song, Lovato uses her higher vocal register in a crescendo. The lyrics reflects about a past situation in a negative relationship with an abusive partner with the singer expressing that its presence is not as necessary as before. Although it is written in a perspective of an ended relationship, Lovato explained that the song is a look back at her personal struggles and addictions, saying: "I sang [it] with a lot of emotion because it reminded me of my relationship with my old self that I don't relate to anymore."

== Critical reception ==
The song was met with critical acclaim from critics. Billboard's Rob Arcand praised Lovato's vocal range on the track, writing it reaches "near-Adele limits in melisma and virtuosity". While reviewing Tell Me You Love Me, Jamieson Cox of Pitchfork described the track as a "soaring breakup anthem" and said the track "seeks to overcome with sheer athleticism". Aidin Vaziri of the San Francisco Chronicle described the track as "brassy kiss-offs".

== Live performances ==
Lovato performed the track for the first time during American Airlines AAAdvantage Mastercard Concert at the New York City Center on January 24, 2018. The song served as the opening song on her sixth headlining tour, the Tell Me You Love Me World Tour. While reviewing the show in Phoenix, Ashley Naftule of Phoenix New Times praised Lovato for the performance. "Her voice was loud and clear, while her presence and technique are impressive," she wrote.

== Credits and personnel ==
Recording and management

- Recorded at Big Noize Studio (Hollywood Hills)
- Vocals recorded at Westlake Recording Studios (Los Angeles)
- Mixed at Sonic Element Studios (Los Angeles)
- Mastered at Sterling Sound Studios (New York City)
- Published by DDLovato Music/Universal Music Corp. (ASCAP), BMG Platinum Songs (BMI), Chloe Angelides Publishing/Where Da Kasr At (BMI), Songs Music Publishing LLC/Sounds of Ashe Publishing (BMI), Songs MP (BMI), Fried Rice and Chicken Noodle Music/Honua Songs/These Are Pulse Songs

Personnel

- Demi Lovato – lead vocals
- Jonas Jeberg – production, recording, all instruments
- Anton Kuhl – additional production
- Mitch Allan – vocal production
- Scott Robinson – additional vocal production
- Jose Balaguer – vocals recording
- Nicole "Coco" Llorens – assistant
- Erik Madrid – mixing
- Alex Spencer – mixing assistant
- Chris Gehringer – mastering
- Will Quinnell – mastering

Credits adapted from the liner notes of Tell Me You Love Me.

== Charts ==
Chart performance for "You Don't Do It for Me Anymore"
| Chart (2017) | Peak position |
|---|---|
| New Zealand Heatseekers (RMNZ) | 4 |
| Sweden Heatseeker (Sverigetopplistan) | 9 |
| US Digital Song Sales (Billboard) | 40 |

== Certifications ==
Certifications and sales for "You Don't Do It for Me Anymore"
| Region | Certification | Certified units/sales |
|---|---|---|
| United States (RIAA) | Gold | 500,000^{‡} |
^{‡} Sales+streaming figures based on certification alone.
