= Tell Me You Love Me (album) =

2017 studio album by Demi Lovato

- Standard cover

Studio album by Demi Lovato
- Released: September 29, 2017
- Recorded: 2017
- Studios: Westlake; SuCasa; VsTheWorld; Sherpa; Henson; Cheat Codes Home Studio (Los Angeles); Rodeo; UMPG (Santa Monica, California); Venice Way (Vancouver, Canada); Jungle City (New York City); Big Noize (Hollywood Hills); Mission Sound (Brooklyn); Encore (Burbank, California); Hit Factory Criteria (Miami, Florida); Artcrime
- Genres: Soul; R&B
- Length: 42:59
- Labels: Island; Hollywood; Safehouse
- Producers: Oak Felder; "Downtown" Trevor Brown; Zaire Koalo; Stint; John Hill; Mitch Allan; Scott Robinson; Jonas Jeberg; Anton Kuhl; Ido Zmishlany; DJ Mustard; Sermstyle; Kevin Hissink; Taylor Parks; Rush Hr.; Jax Jones; Mark Ralph; Steve "Styles" Rodriguez; Mokita; Trevor Dahl; Ari Leff; Jackson Foote; Sarah Aarons; Ben Abraham; Sir Nolan

Demi Lovato chronology
Confident (2015)	Tell Me You Love Me (2017)	Dancing with the Devil... the Art of Starting Over (2021)

Singles from Tell Me You Love Me
- 1. "Sorry Not Sorry" Released: July 11, 2017; 2. "Tell Me You Love Me" Released: November 14, 2017

Tell Me You Love Me is the sixth studio album by American singer Demi Lovato. It was released on September 29, 2017, by Island, Hollywood, and Safehouse Records. Primarily a soul and R&B record, the album was described by Lovato as having a more "soulful" side than her previous work. She named Christina Aguilera, Aretha Franklin, and Kehlani as its major influences. Contributions to Tell Me You Love Me's production came from various producers, including Mitch Allan, David Massey, Oak Felder, Stint, and John Hill.

The lead single "Sorry Not Sorry" went on to become Lovato's highest-charting single in the United States, peaking at number six on the Billboard Hot 100 and being certified 7× Platinum by the Recording Industry Association of America (RIAA). The title track was released as the second and final single, peaking at number 53 on the Hot 100 and later was certified double Platinum by the RIAA.

Tell Me You Love Me received generally favorable reviews from music critics, many of whom praised its production and Lovato's emotive vocal performance, with some deeming it her finest album to date. It charted within the top ten in Australia, Belgium, Canada, Ireland, Mexico, the Netherlands, New Zealand, Scotland, Spain, the United Kingdom, and the United States. To support the album, she embarked on the Tell Me You Love Me World Tour in 2018. On May 7, 2021, Lovato released previous Target-edition bonus tracks "Smoke & Mirrors" and "Ready for Ya" as part of the deluxe version of Tell Me You Love Me.

== Recording and development ==
Following her fifth studio album, Confident (2015), Lovato discussed with Latina magazine wanting her follow-up album to have a "more soulful vibe". In October 2016, she announced via Twitter her plans to take a break from music and the spotlight in 2017, stating: "I'm not meant for this business or the media." After once stating that another album would not follow until 2018, Lovato revealed in August 2017 that doing charity work earlier that year rejuvenated her enough to create music again, which eventually led to an album. She also mentioned how its title and release date had been chosen, but was not allowed to disclose them at the time.

For Tell Me You Love Me, Lovato was influenced by multiple artists, including Aretha Franklin, Christina Aguilera, and Kehlani. According to her, the album was heavily inspired by Aguilera's fourth studio album, Stripped (2002), calling it "a breakout album that really transformed [Aguilera] into the icon that she is today". Lovato worked with producers Pharrell Williams and Mike Will Made It, but she stated that their work would not be featured on the album.

== Composition ==
Tell Me You Love Me is primarily a soul and R&B album. Lovato adopted R&B as a key to achieve her desired "mature" sound; according to her, she wanted to make sure that this "album showcased her voice." On the other hand, she also deemed Tell Me You Love Me a "soulful" record, as she explained to Time magazine, its sonority serves as a real representation of who she was artistically and personally at that moment. Stephen Thomas Erlewine from AllMusic perceived, although there are ghosts of traditional soul threaded through the record, "the production is firmly modern, filled with electronic flair and allusions to hip-hop rhythms."

=== Songs ===
The opener "Sorry Not Sorry" contains multiple synthesized effects such as handclaps, finger snaps, a distorted bass voice, and club synths. These effects are intercepted with a heavy bassline, hip hop beats, and gospel-infused piano notes. Elias Leight of Rolling Stone noted that Lovato expands to fill the track's empty space by "belting her non-apology with the vindictive force of someone who knows their actions are justified". According to Lovato, "Sorry Not Sorry" is a song for the "haters" with the message: "You know what? I'm good now, and sorry I'm not sorry that you may not be loving where your life is at the moment."

The title track is a gospel-influenced ballad, instrumentally complete with horns, percussive drums, handclaps, and wah-wah guitar lines. Lovato explained that the song is about "the vulnerability of coming out of a very serious relationship and having a tough time with it" and further commented that lines like "You ain't nobody 'til you got somebody" causes "a big misconception". Exhibiting influences from 1980s and 1990s musical styles, "Sexy Dirty Love" has an uptempo danceable rhythm that blends funk and disco as well as R&B and electro genres. It narrates a romantic encounter initiated via web with Lovato singing about fantasy through the phone in the first verse.

Composed in a compound time signature, "You Don't Do It for Me Anymore" features a slow tempo subdued beat and strings chords. Rob Arcand of Billboard wrote that her vocal range reaches "near-Adele limits in melisma and virtuosity". The lyrics reflect about a past situation in a negative relationship with an abusive partner with the singer expressing that its presence is not as necessary as before. Although it's written in a perspective of an ended relationship, Lovato explained that the song is a look back at her personal struggles and addictions, saying: "I sang [it] with a lot of emotion because it reminded me of my relationship with my old self that I don't relate to anymore."

The electronic song "Daddy Issues" sees Lovato singing about a torrid affair with an older man explaining that she has some issues and certain behaviors caused by her relationship with her father. Lovato confessed that the lyrics were ones she came up with, based on her own experiences. Its synthpop production contains heavy stuttering synth drops and keyboard effects. In "Ruin the Friendship", Lovato invites a special friend to take their relationship to a romantic level, appreciating his appearance and confessing her sexual intentions with him. During the verses, she sings accompanied by a bass guitar and a tenor saxophone. With a melodic horn section during the chorus, the song features and contains a smooth, slow-burn atmosphere reminiscent of jazz music. Its sound also demonstrates influences from traditional rhythm and blues.

"Only Forever" is a melancholic song about wanting the person you want to explore a new relationship with to make that first move or take that next step. With a message of "giving someone chances that will last a lifetime", Lovato considered "Only Forever" as a sequel to "Ruin the Friendship". The song also has a connection with her personal experiences and was used in a sequence of ad campaigns for the fashion brand Dior, promoting the brands "Dior Forever" makeup collection. "Lonely" is a duet with rapper Lil Wayne that finds Lovato as a protagonist expressing angriness and disappointment about the behavior of an abusive partner with Wayne's verses reiterating these feelings. Its production, handled by DJ Mustard, features sparse, ambient synths in contrasts with a trap-inflected minimalist beat.

A downtempo ballad with influences from rock n' roll music, "Cry Baby" makes use of a pounding piano, snare and bass drums, and electric guitar riff slides. It shows Lovato singing about experiencing a dramatic romantic situation that alternates her solid personality, making her a fragile person. As she sings in the chorus, although her heart is the "hardest to break", a romantic interest made her cry and feel heartbroken. According to Lovato, "Games" is about "playing games when she got out of a relationship and started dating again". As Alexia Camp of Slant Magazine commented, it finds Lovato "giving as good as she gets when her object of affection sends mixed (text) messages". The twelfth track, "Hitchhiker", is an optimistic love song about taking an emotional leap with a stranger.

== Release and promotion ==
On August 23, 2017, Lovato posted an 18-second video to her Twitter account, in which she's seen singing the title track, "Tell Me You Love Me", in a recording studio. As the camera pans out, the footage appears to be reflected on Lovato's eye while zooming further back and unveiling the standard edition album cover; a black and white close-up photo of her face with the album title underneath. The album cover is then dimmed, to reveal the release date of September 29. Along with these, Lovato announced its availability for pre-order at midnight on August 24. On September 13, Lovato unveiled the tracklist with help from her fans on Twitter.

Lovato celebrated the album by hosting a live stream event with Vevo on September 29, where she discussed the album and delivered acoustic performances of "Sorry Not Sorry" and "Tell Me You Love Me". Lovato also partnered with audio electronics company JBL to host a pop-up exhibition in New York City, showcasing the album's editorial photography and custom murals inspired by the album, created by a painter Lora Zombie. On May 7, 2021, Lovato released previous Target edition bonus tracks "Smoke & Mirrors" and "Ready for Ya" as part of the deluxe edition.

=== Singles ===
"Sorry Not Sorry" was released as Tell Me You Love Me's lead single on July 11, 2017. It peaked at number six on the US Billboard Hot 100, becoming her highest-charting single there. On the same day, Lovato teased its music video in during an interview with Amazon Music, revealing that Paris Hilton, Wiz Khalifa, and among others would be featured on it. Shot on June 29 in California, the video was released on July 21. On December 15, 2023, "Sorry Not Sorry" was certified 7× Platinum by the Recording Industry Association of America (RIAA).

The title track "Tell Me You Love Me" was released as the first promotional single along with the album's pre-order on August 24, 2017. It was released as the second and final single on November 14. The accompanying music video directed by Mark Pellington was released on December 1, featuring Jesse Williams. After being released as a single, the song debuted and later peaked at number 53 on the Hot 100. RIAA certified "Tell Me You Love Me" 2× Platinum on January 8, 2020.

"You Don't Do It for Me Anymore" was released as the second promotional single on September 8, 2017. The track sold 12,757 copies in its first week of release, peaking at number 40 on the US Digital Song Sales chart. It was certified Gold by the RIAA on December 15, 2023. The third promotional single, "Sexy Dirty Love", was released on September 22, 2017, selling 8,486 copies in its first week of release.

=== Tour ===
On October 26, 2017, Lovato announced she was going on tour. It began in San Diego on February 26, 2018, and concluded on July 22 in Paso Robles. The tour's supporting acts included DJ Khaled, Kehlani, Kelsea Ballerini, Lauren Jauregui, Jax Jones, Joy, Iggy Azalea, Lauv, and Becky G. The tour's opening North American leg grossed $20.2 million from 20 shows between February 26 and April 2, 2018, with 262,403 tickets sold.

== Critical reception ==
Professional ratings
Aggregate scores
Source	Rating
Metacritic	72/100
Review scores
Source	Rating
AllMusic	3.5/5 stars
Entertainment Weekly	B
Herald Sun	3.5/4 stars
Hot Press	7/10
Los Angeles Times	80/100
Music Connection	8/10
Pitchfork	7.2/10
Rolling Stone	3/5 stars
Slant Magazine	3/5 stars
Spectrum Culture	3.75/5 stars

Tell Me You Love Me received generally positive reviews from music critics. According to the review aggregator Metacritic, Tell Me You Love Me received "generally favorable reviews" based on a weighted average score of 72 out of 100 from six critic scores.

For Pitchfork, Jamieson Cox stated that Lovato "has finally settled into a consistently compelling space: flinty, flirty R&B that's just as thrilling hushed as it is at full blast", and noticed the improvement over her previous works: "It gives you enough space to see Demi as something other than a no-holds-barred belter. You want to get to know the Lovato behind Tell Me You Love Me, something you can't definitively say about any of her other releases". Stephen Thomas Erlewine of AllMusic wrote that the album "runs the gamut from churchy soul to seductive slow-burners to showstopping ballads designed to showcase every single one of Lovato's diva moves". The Herald Sun deemed it "impressive" and felt "Daddy Issues" was the best track. Da'Shan Smith of Rap-Up praised that the record had "saved [his] life" while he worked through the end of a longstanding friendship and struggles with his emotional well-being. He said the album reflected his own ideas about love and life and continued to help him heal, expressing gratitude to Lovato for its impact.

In a positive review, Aidin Vaziri of the San Francisco Chronicle wrote that Lovato "feels jilted, and conjuring the battle cries of pop predecessors like Christina Aguilera and Kelly Clarkson, [Lovato] unleashes on exes and backstabbing friends with the kind of vocal firepower best appreciated from a safe distance". Los Angeles Times writer Mikael Wood praised the album's tracks as "catchy and funny and sexy and daring", and wrote that Tell Me You Love Me "presents a singer burning with purpose". For Entertainment Weekly's editor Tim Snatc, Tell Me You Love Me "suffers for some of its excessive vocal fireworks." Giving the album a B rating, he felt that the best parts of the album are "on the first half and showcase Lovato's swagger, especially the standout gospel-tinged title track." Writing for Rolling Stone, Maura Johnston stated the album "gets bogged down" in chilled-out trap pop. She later commented slow-tempo tracks like "Concentrate" balanced the downtempo and the energetic tracks.

Ranking the best albums of 2017, Time gave an honorable mention to Tell Me You Love Me, noting: "Lovato's full-throated pop on Tell Me You Love Me" and acclaiming Lovato for "stepping outside of comfort zones and creating new pathways for music to follow". Billboard chose "Daddy Issues" as one of the 100 Best Songs of 2017, and named it along with "Sexy Dirty Love" and "Ruin the Friendship" as a "gem". In 2022, Consequence's Mary Siroky included Tell Me You Love Me on her list of favorite pop albums in the last 15 years.

=== Year-end lists ===
List of year-end lists
Critic/Publication	List	Rank	Ref.
AllMusic	Favorite Pop Albums – AllMusic 2017 in Review	No order	
Billboard	50 Best Albums of 2017: Critics' Picks	40	
God Is in the TV	Top 50 Albums of 2017	49	
Los Angeles Times	Mikael Wood's top 10 albums of 2017	No order	
People	10 Best Albums of 2017	6	
PopSugar	The Best Albums of 2017, According to Us	10	
Rolling Stone	20 Best Pop Albums of 2017	15	
Thrillist	The Best Albums of 2017	11	

== Commercial performance ==
Tell Me You Love Me opened at number three on the US Billboard 200 with 74,000 album-equivalent units, which consisted of 48,000 pure sales, and became her sixth consecutive top five entry on the chart after all five of her previous studio efforts charted within that range. In Canada, it arrived at number four and became her fifth consecutive album to reach the country's top five. In August 2018, the album was certified platinum by the RIAA.

In the United Kingdom, Tell Me You Love Me debuted at number five on the UK Albums Chart, becoming her highest-charting album in the nation at that time. The record entered at number eight in Australia, becoming her second top 10 album on the ARIA Albums Chart after Confident reached number three.

== Track listing ==
Standard edition
No.	Title	Writer(s)	Producer(s)	Length
1.	"Sorry Not Sorry"	Demi Lovato; Sean Douglas; Warren Felder; Trevor Brown; William Zaire Simmons	Oak; Brown^{[b]}; Zaire Koalo^{[b]}	3:23
2.	"Tell Me You Love Me"	Kirby Lauryen; John Hill; Ajay Bhattacharya	Hill; Stint; Mitch Allan^{[c]}; Scott Robinson^{[d]}	3:56
3.	"Sexy Dirty Love"	Lovato; Felder; Brown; Simmons	Oak; Brown^{[b]}; Koalo^{[b]}	3:33
4.	"You Don't Do It for Me Anymore"	Lovato; Chloe Angelides; Jonas Jeberg; Ashlyn Wilson; James "Gladius" Wong	Jeberg; Anton Kuhl^{[a]}; Allan^{[c]}; Robinson^{[d]}	3:17
5.	"Daddy Issues"	Lovato; Douglas; Felder; Simmons	Oak; Koalo^{[b]}	3:09
6.	"Ruin the Friendship"	Lovato; Angelides; Ido Zmishlany; Brittany Amaradio	Zmishlany	3:53
7.	"Only Forever"	Lovato; Douglas; Felder; Ilsey Juber; Toby Gad	Oak	3:17
8.	"Lonely" (featuring Lil Wayne)	Dwayne Carter; Sarah Aarons; Dijon McFarlane	DJ Mustard; Allan^{[c]}; Robinson^{[d]}	4:41
9.	"Cry Baby"	Lovato; Angelides; Taylor Parks; Kevin Hissink; Jamie Sanderson; Noonie Bao	Sermstyle; Hissink^{[b]}; Tayla Parx^{[c]}	3:42
10.	"Games"	Lovato; Douglas; Felder; Brown; Simmons	Oak; Brown^{[b]}; Koalo^{[b]}	3:08
11.	"Concentrate"	Lovato; Dayyon Alexander; Jimmy Burney; Jeff Shum; Adam Tressler	Rush Hr.; Allan^{[c]}; Robinson^{[d]}	3:17
12.	"Hitchhiker"	Lovato; Alexander; Burney; Winston Howard; Shum; Tressler	Rush Hr.; Allan^{[c]}; Robinson^{[d]}	3:43
Total length:				42:59

Deluxe edition^{[e]}
No.	Title	Writer(s)	Producer(s)	Length
13.	"Instruction" (Jax Jones featuring Demi Lovato and Stefflon Don)	Uzoechi Emenike; Lovato; Stephanie Allen; Jax Jones	Jax Jones; Mark Ralph^{[a]}	2:45
14.	"Sorry Not Sorry" (acoustic)	Lovato; Douglas; Felder; Brown; Simmons	Steve "Styles" Rodriguez	3:25
15.	"No Promises" (acoustic; Cheat Codes featuring Demi Lovato)	Lovato; Ari Staprans Leff; Trevor Dahl; Jackson Foote; Emma Block	Dahl; Lauv; Foote; Mokita^{[a]}; Allan^{[c]}	3:52
16.	"Smoke & Mirrors"	Lovato; Ben Abraham; Aarons	Abraham; Aarons; Allan^{[c]}; Robinson^{[d]}	3:57
17.	"Ready for Ya"	Lovato; Nolan Lambroza; Simon Wilcox; Nick Jonas	Sir Nolan	3:30
Total length:				60:28

=== Notes ===
- ^{^[a]} signifies an additional producer.
- ^{^[b]} signifies a co-producer.
- ^{^[c]} signifies a vocal producer.
- ^{^[d]} signifies an additional vocal producer.
- ^{^[e]} tracks 16 and 17 were originally exclusive to Target, Australian and New Zealand CD deluxe versions. In 2021 they were made available on digital platforms wordwide.

== Credits and personnel ==
Credits were adapted from the liner notes.

=== Recording locations ===
- Westlake Recording Studios; Los Angeles, California (recording: track 1; vocals recording: tracks 4, 9; assistant recording: track 6)
- SuCasa Recording; Los Angeles, California (additional recording: track 1; recording: tracks 3, 5, 7, 10)
- Rodeo Recordings; Santa Monica, California (recording: track 2)
- Venice Way Studios North; Vancouver, Canada (recording: track 2)
- Jungle City Studios; New York City (vocals recording: tracks 2, 8)
- Big Noize Studios; Hollywood Hills, California (recording: track 4)
- VsTheWorld Studios; Los Angeles, California (recording: track 6)
- Mission Sound; Brooklyn (recording: track 6)
- UMPG Studios; Santa Monica, California (assistant recording: track 6)
- Encore Studios; Burbank, California (assistant recording: track 6)
- Hit Factory Criteria; Miami, Florida (Lil Wayne vocals recording: track 8)
- Artcrime Studios (recording: tracks 9, 11–12)
- Sherpa Studios; Los Angeles, California (vocals recording: tracks 11–12)
- Henson Studios; Los Angeles, California (recording: track 14)
- Cheat Codes Home Studio; Los Angeles, California (recording: track 15)

=== Performers and musicians ===
- Demi Lovato – lead vocals
- Lil Wayne – featured artist (track 8)
- Stefflon Don – featured artist (track 13)
- Jax Jones – featured artist (track 13)
- Cheat Codes – featured artist (track 15)
- Jonathan Asperil – electric guitar (track 14)
- Laurhan Beato – alto (track 14)
- Nelson Beato – tenor (track 14)
- Daro Behroozi – tenor saxophone (track 6)
- "Downtown" Trevor Brown – additional vocals (track 3)
- Carl L. Carter – percussion (track 14), drums (track 14)
- Deonis "Pumah" Cook – tenor (track 14)
- Charity "CherryD" Davis – background vocals (track 14)
- Quishima Dixon – alto (track 14)
- Sean Douglas – background vocals (track 1)
- Thomas Drayton – bass (tracks 11–12)
- Warren "Oak" Felder – keyboards (tracks 1, 3), additional vocals (track 3), synthesizer (tracks 3, 5), acoustic guitar (track 5)
- Joshua Gawel – trumpet (track 6)
- John Hill – drums (track 2), bass (track 2), guitar (track 2), horn (track 2), piano (track 2)
- Kevin Hissink – guitars (track 9), bass (track 9)
- Jonas Jeberg – all instruments (track 4)
- Jax Jones – drums (track 13), synths (track 13)
- Zaire Koalo – additional vocals (tracks 1, 3)
- Kirby Lauryen – background vocals (track 2)
- Ayani Layli – background vocals (track 14)
- MNEK – background vocals (track 13)
- Dave Palmer – keyboards (track 2)
- Bennett Paysinger – Hammond B3 (track 14)
- Andrew Portes – bass (track 6)
- Lenny "The Ox" Reece – drums (track 6)
- Steven "Styles" Rodriguez – piano (track 14), Fender Rhodes (track 14), Hammond B3 (track 14), electric guitar (track 14)
- Whitney Rollins – soprano (track 14)
- Adam Ross – acoustic guitar (track 14)
- Sermstyle – keyboards (track 9)
- Sir Nolan – all instrumentation (track 17)
- Stint – drums (track 2), bass (track 2), guitar (track 2), horn (track 2), piano (track 2)
- Adam Tressler – guitar (tracks 11–12)
- Danielle Withers – soprano (track 14)
- Ido Zmishlany – guitar (track 6), keyboards (track 6), percussion (track 6), piano (track 6)

=== Production ===
- Sarah Aarons – production (track 16), recording (track 16)
- Ben Abraham – production (track 16), recording (track 16)
- Mitch Allan – vocal production (tracks 4, 8, 11–12, 15–16), engineering (tracks 2, 4, 15)
- Jose Balaguer – engineering (track 1), vocal recording (track 4)
- Matt Bang – recording (track 6)
- "Downtown" Trevor Brown – co-production (tracks 1, 3, 10), programming (tracks 1, 3), synthesizer programming (tracks 1, 3, 10)
- Zach Brown – assistant recording (track 6)
- Cheat Codes – recording (track 15)
- Rob Cohen – engineering (track 2), recording and editing (track 2)
- Miles Comasky – assistant mix engineer (track 6)
- Serge Courtois – mixing (track 17)
- Trevor Dahl – production (track 15), programming (track 15)
- Scott Desmarais – mixing assistant (track 1)
- DJ Mustard – production (track 8)
- Eric J Dubowsky – mixing (track 5)
- Oak Felder – production (tracks 1, 3, 5, 7, 10), programming (tracks 1, 5, 7, 10), additional recording (track 1), keyboards arrangement (tracks 1, 3), recording (tracks 3, 5, 7, 10), synthesizer programming (tracks 1, 10)
- Mike Fennel – recording (track 6)
- Robin Florent – mixing assistant (track 1)
- Jackson Foote – production (track 15), programming (track 15)
- Tom AD Fuller – assistant engineering (track 13)
- Chris Galland – mixing engineering (track 1)
- Manny Galvez – vocal recording (track 8)
- Chris Gehringer – mastering
- Serban Ghenea – mixing (tracks 2, 15)
- Martin Gray – assistant recording (track 6)
- John Hanes – engineered for mix (tracks 2, 15)
- Stuart Hawkes – mastering (track 13)
- John Hill – production (track 2), programming (track 2)
- Kevin Hissink – co-production (track 9), recording (tracks 9, 11–12)
- Jonas Jeberg – production (track 4), engineering (track 4), recording (track 4)
- Chantry Johnson – vocal recording (tracks 11–12, 16)
- Jax Jones – production (track 13), programming (track 13), drums programming (track 13), synth programming (track 13), recording arrangement (track 13)
- Jaycen Joshua – mixing (track 8)
- Zaire Koalo – co-production (tracks 1, 3, 5, 10), drums programming (tracks 1, 3, 5, 10)
- Anton Kuhl – production (track 4)
- Ari Leff – production (track 15), programming (track 15)
- Nicole "Coco" Llorens – assistant engineering (track 1), assistant (track 4), recording (track 6)
- Erik Madrid – mixing (tracks 3–4, 7, 9–12)
- Manny Marroquin – mixing (track 1)
- Tony Maserati – mixing (track 6)
- Zeke Mishanec – vocal recording (tracks 2, 8)
- Taylor Parks – vocal production (track 9)
- Will Quinnell – mastering
- Mark Ralph – production (track 13), mixing (track 13)
- Scott Robinson – additional vocal production (tracks 4, 8, 11–12)
- Rush Hr. – production (tracks 11–12)
- Sermstyle – production (track 9)
- Sir Nolan – production (track 17), recording (track 17), programming (track 17)
- Keith "Daquan" Sorrells – assistant engineering (tracks 1, 3, 5, 7, 10)
- Alex Spencer – assistant mixing (tracks 3, 7, 9–12)
- Stint – production (track 2), programming (track 2)
- Oli Straus – recording (track 6)
- Drew Smith – engineering (track 13)
- Jaime Velez – vocals recording (track 9)
- Tim Watt – assistant mixing (track 5)
- Nolan Westcott – recording (track 6)
- Ido Zmishlany – production (track 6), recording (track 6), programming (track 6)

=== Design ===
- Sandra Brummels – art direction
- Alberto Erazo – art direction, design
- Kyledidthis – art direction, design
- Dennis Leupold – photography
- David Massey – executive producer
- Andy Proctor – package production

== Charts ==
=== Weekly charts ===
Weekly chart performance
Chart (2017)	Peak position
Australian Albums (ARIA)	8
Austrian Albums (Ö3 Austria)	29
Belgian Albums (Ultratop Flanders)	10
Belgian Albums (Ultratop Wallonia)	27
Canadian Albums (Billboard)	4
Croatian International Albums (HDU)	31
Czech Albums (ČNS IFPI)	16
Danish Albums (Hitlisten)	26
Dutch Albums (Album Top 100)	10
Finnish Albums (Suomen virallinen lista)	20
French Albums (SNEP)	63
German Albums (Offizielle Top 100)	32
Greek Albums (IFPI)	34
Irish Albums (IRMA)	7
Italian Albums (FIMI)	12
Latvian Albums (LaIPA)	82
Mexican Albums (AMPROFON)	2
New Zealand Albums (RMNZ)	6
Norwegian Albums (VG-lista)	13
Polish Albums (ZPAV)	32
Portuguese Albums (AFP)	28
Scottish Albums (Official Charts)	6
Slovak Albums (ČNS IFPI)	21
Spanish Albums (PROMUSICAE)	4
Swedish Albums (Sverigetopplistan)	13
Swiss Albums (Schweizer Hitparade)	32
UK Albums (Official Charts)	5
US Billboard 200	3

=== Monthly charts ===
Monthly chart performance
Chart (2017)	Peak position
Argentine Albums (CAPIF)	7

=== Year-end charts ===
2017 year-end chart performance
Chart (2017)	Position
Belgian Albums (Ultratop Flanders)	159
US Billboard 200	170

2018 year-end chart performance
Chart (2018)	Position
Canadian Albums (Billboard)	49
US Billboard 200	35

== Certifications ==
Certifications and sales
Region	Certification	Certified units/sales
Canada (Music Canada)	Gold	40,000^{‡}
Denmark (IFPI Danmark)	Gold	10,000^{‡}
Mexico (AMPROFON)	Gold	30,000^{‡}
New Zealand (RMNZ)	Platinum	15,000^{‡}
Norway (IFPI Norway)	Platinum	20,000^{‡}
Philippines	Platinum	15,000
United Kingdom (BPI)	Gold	100,000^{‡}
United States (RIAA)	Platinum	1,000,000^{‡}
^{‡} Sales+streaming figures based on certification alone.

== Release history ==
List of release dates, formats, labels, and editions
Region	Date	Format(s)	Labels	Edition(s)	Ref.
Various	September 29, 2017	CD; digital download	Hollywood; Island; Safehouse	Standard; deluxe	
Various	December 15, 2017	LP	Hollywood; Island; Safehouse	Standard	
