= Daddy Issues =

Daddy Issues or daddy issues may refer to:

== Film and television ==
- Daddy Issues (film), a 2018 film
- Daddy Issues (TV series), a 2024 British TV series
- "Daddy Issues" (Slow Horses), a 2026 episode
- "Daddy Issues" (Stick), a 2025 episode
- "Daddy Issues" (The Vampire Diaries), a 2011 episode

== Music ==
- Daddy Issues (band), an American band from Nashville, Tennessee
- "Daddy Issues" (The Neighbourhood song), 2016
- "Daddy Issues" (Demi Lovato song), 2017

== See also ==
- Father complex, the psychological complex pertaining to someone's relationship with their father or the general archetype of the father
