= Confident (album) =

2015 studio album by Demi Lovato

Studio album by Demi Lovato
- Released: October 16, 2015
- Studios: MXM Studios; Chalice Studios; Westlake Audio Studios (Los Angeles); Wolf Cousins Studios, Kinglet Studios (Stockholm); Rokstone Studios, The Hide Out Studios (London)
- Genres: Pop; dance; electropop; power pop
- Length: 38:59
- Labels: Hollywood; Island; Safehouse
- Producers: Mitch Allan; Babydaddy; Johan Carlsson; Peter Carlsson; Jason Evigan; Carl Falk; Ilya; Steve Mac; Max Martin; Ali Payami; Laleh Pourkarim; Rami; Stargate; Gustaf Thörn

Demi Lovato chronology
Demi (2013)	Confident (2015)	Tell Me You Love Me (2017)

Singles from Confident
- 1. "Cool for the Summer" Released: July 1, 2015; 2. "Confident" Released: September 18, 2015; 3. "Stone Cold" Released: March 21, 2016

Confident is the fifth studio album by American singer Demi Lovato. It was released on October 16, 2015, by Hollywood, Island and Safehouse Records. While Lovato co-wrote most of the songs on the album, she worked with writers and producers such as Max Martin, Ryan Tedder, Steve Mac, Rami and Stargate, among others. Musically, Confident is primarily a pop, dance, electropop, and power pop record with influences of R&B, soul, EDM and urban. The album features guest appearances from Australian rapper Iggy Azalea and American rapper Sirah.

Confident received generally positive reviews from music critics, with many praising its themes. Its lead single, "Cool for the Summer", was released on July 1, 2015, peaking at number 11 on the US Billboard Hot 100 and being certified 3× Platinum by Recording Industry Association of America (RIAA). The second single, "Confident", premiered on September 18, 2015, and peaked at number 21 on the Hot 100 and was certified 4× Platinum by RIAA. The third and final single, "Stone Cold", peaked at number 2 on the Bubbling Under Hot 100 and was certified Platinum by the RIAA. Following its release, the album debuted at number one in Canada, while reaching the top 10 in fifteen other countries, including the United Kingdom and the United States. The album was further promoted with a concert tour co-headlined with Nick Jonas, entitled the Future Now Tour. Confident was nominated for Best Pop Vocal Album at the 59th Annual Grammy Awards, marking Lovato's first career Grammy nomination.

== Background and development ==
After releasing her fourth studio album Demi in May 2013, Lovato confirmed in February 2014 that she was working on her fifth studio effort, stating, "The sound just evolves into everything that I've been and everything that I want to become." Lovato also said, "I've never been so sure of myself as an artist when it comes down to confidence, but not only personal things, but exactly what I want my sound to be and what I know I'm capable of and this album will give me the opportunity to show people what I can really do." The following October, Lovato's then-manager confirmed to Billboard that she had "done some songs, but certainly the majority of it will kick off next year", following her Demi World Tour.

In February 2015, Lovato teased the album with a number of posts on Twitter, writing: "I've never been more confident in my sound. Never been so sure of who I am as an artist. Never felt this hungry and driven." Lovato further described the album as "very authentic to who I am". In June 2015, Lovato confirmed that she had been in the studio almost every day and would be releasing new music "very soon". Lovato revealed to MTV News: "This time around, I was able to explore different sounds, and hone in [sic] on something that I'm really proud of." Lovato also expressed wishes to work with rapper Iggy Azalea on the album.

== Recording and production ==
For Confident, Lovato worked with music producers including Max Martin, Ilya Salmanzadeh, Ali Payami, Jason Evigan, Johan Carlsson, Steve Mac, Stargate, Carl Falk, Rami Yacoub, Babydaddy and Peter Carlsson. Discussing the album's direction, Lovato told Ryan Seacrest that "I'm no longer serious", stating: "I'm done with the sob stories. New chapter, new life, new album, new single — this is a completely new Demi." The first songs "Confident" and "Cool for the Summer" among with "Stars" and "Mr. Hughes" were recorded at MXM Studios, Chalice Studios, Westlake Audio Studios in Los Angeles, California and Wolf Cousins Studios and Kinglet Studios in Stockholm. Lovato co-wrote both tracks with Martin, Kotecha, Alexander Erik, Payami and Salmazadeh. The horn arrangement from "Confident" was provided by musician Jonas Thander. The songs were both mixed by Serban Ghenea and mastered by Tom Coyne. Others songs of the album also were recorded at Rokstone Studios and The Hide Out Studios in London, United Kingdom. "For You" was one of the first songs recorded for the album, describing how it was working with the producer Max Martin in the song's production, Lovato revealed, "I was just so excited to get to work with Max Martin on this song and his camp. I was so nervous when I went in. I wanted to put my everything into that performance because I knew that I was given the opportunity that I waited for for so many years to be able to work with somebody like him."

The ballad "Father" is the most personal song on the album. It is dedicated to Lovato's biological father who died in 2013. The song was co-written by Lovato and Swedish musician Laleh Pourkarim who also produced the song and contributed on the background vocals. Lovato said that recording the song was therapeutic in a way, and helped her reconcile her conflicting emotions. "To know that it wasn't really his fault really was saddening to me," Lovato continued. "I wanted to write about it. I wanted to process it, and 'Father' really helped me do that." Lovato and Pourkarim with Gustaf Thörn also co-wrote "Stone Cold" and "Yes". The musician Jason Evigan wrote and produced "Old Ways" with Olivia Waithe and additional production by Scott Hoffman (credited Babydaddy). "Kingdom Come" was co-written by Steve Mac, Julia Michaels and the Australian rapper Iggy Azalea who features guest appearance on the song. In an interview with MTV News, Lovato explained how her collaboration came together – and how Azalea knew exactly what to do without any idea what the song sounded like. "When we finally made the decision of which songs were making the album I said, 'OK, I want her on this one.' So I called her and was like, 'Hey will you do a song?' And she's like, 'Yeah sure I'll go into the studio tonight,'" Lovato said. "I was like, 'Do you want to hear it first?' She's like, 'No it's cool.' I'm like, 'You're an amazing friend and I love you.'" Mac also composed "Waitin for You" with Evigan, American rapper Sirah and Mitch Allan. He produced and played all keyboards in "Lionheart". "Wildfire" was written by Ryan Tedder, and Nicole Morier and the Norwegian production team Stargate who produced the track.

== Composition ==
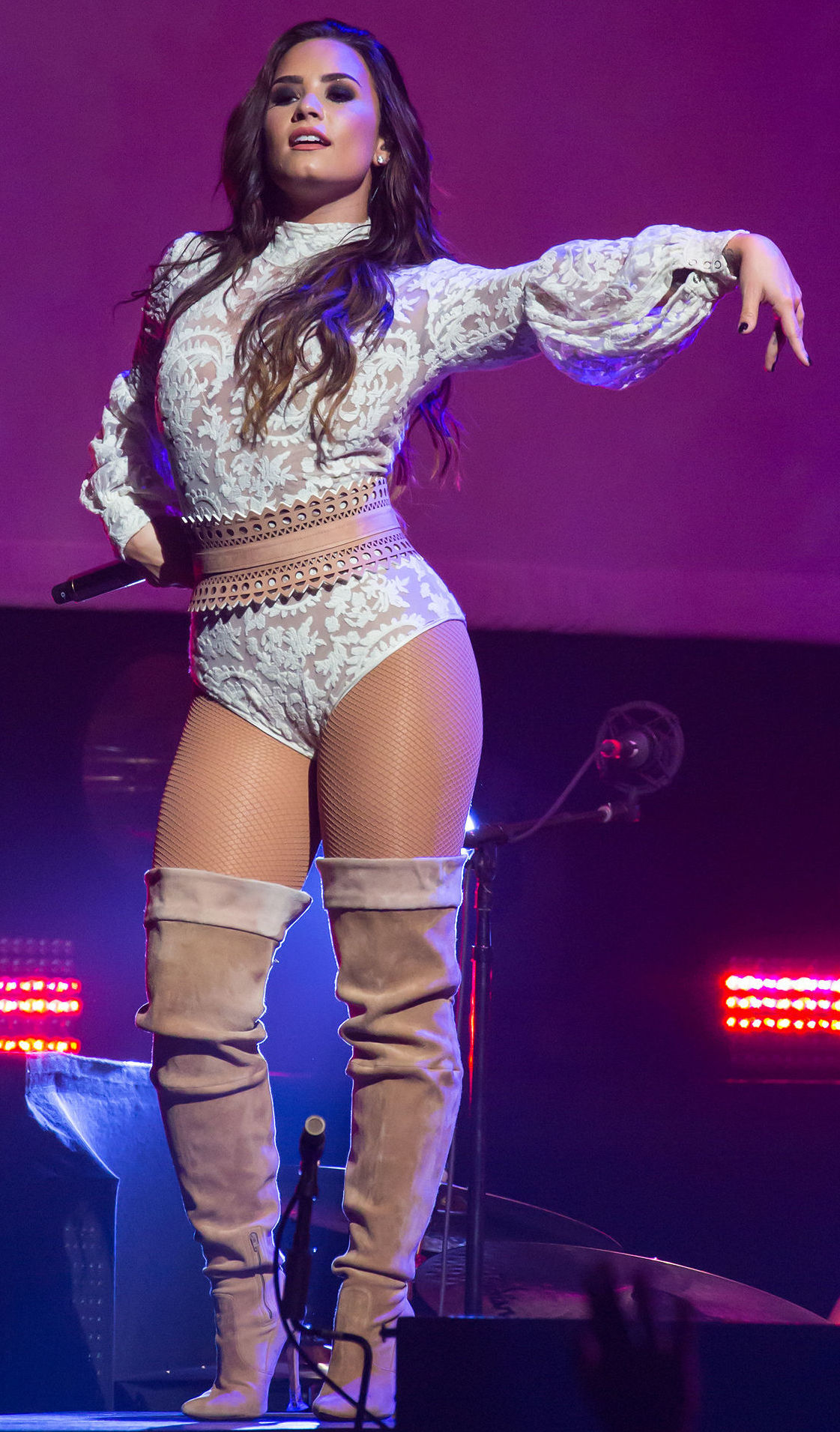
Lovato performing at the AT&T Center in San Antonio, Texas during the Future Now Tour on September 10, 2016.

In terms of music, Confident departs from the bubblegum pop and synthpop predominant sound of her previous album Demi, in favour of a modern pop sound, featuring "steely, assured dance" and "shimmering electropop". Reviewing the album, Brittany Spanos from Rolling Stone described it as "a brassy, sleek, dynamic pop production that lets [Lovato's] powerful voice soar to new emotional highs." The album begins with horns that introduced the title track Confident. It features horns samples and finger snaps that back the entire track and come to the forefront during the start of the chorus. Lyrically, the song talk about self-empowerment and confidence. Nick Levine from the site NME wrote that the song "fuses hip-hop horns and Joan Jett beats and has [Lovato] bragging "it's all about me tonight". Critics noted that the song beat is reminiscent of Marilyn Manson's "Personal Jesus" (2004). The second track "Cool for the Summer" is introduced by a piano melody, followed by a buzzing synth beat, that is accompanied by guitar riffs on the chorus. Musically the song is styled in a rock edge with electronic arrangements. Lyrically, the song is about sexually experimenting with a female lover during summertime. In "Old Ways", Lovato asserts that she is glad to be rid of past habits and refuses to give in to temptation.

The album's fourth track is "For You", Maura Johnston of Billboard described it as a "majestic devotional". She noted the song "has a backup choir singing "For you I would do anything" as Lovato sings about summoning strength, her performance making her inner power even more plain." The album first ballad, "Stone Cold" discusses the pain of watching an ex move on and be happy with someone else. The song incorporates pop and soul influences, and is centered on a piano melody, with a stripped down production aimed at highlighting Lovato's vocals. "Stone Cold" received comparisons to Lovato's 2011 song "Skyscraper" and the work of English singer Adele. The album follow with the trap-pop song "Kingdom Come" it features vocal appearance by rapper Iggy Azalea. Several critics noted that the song is comparable to Azalea's "Black Widow" (2014), featuring Rita Ora. "Waitin for You" featuring vocals by singer Sirah, musically, it's an R&B and hip hop song that starts with a "dark and atmospheric opening" and is characteristic for having "a massive beat increase which appears to result in a impending crescendo but then results in a beat-drop". "Wildfire" is a soul-pop song. In the song, Lovato sings with synths and snaps floating around her voice. "Yes" was described as a sultry R&B song while in "Father" Lovato uses a higher vocal register, which "maximizes her emotional impact". The stripped down gospel song "Father" is dedicated for Lovato's biological father who died in 2013. It is the most personal song on the album. The twelfth track, "Stars", features "bass drum and hand-clap rhythms". Sleigh Bells alleged these were taken from their song "Infinity Guitars" without permission.

== Release ==
Confident was the singer's first album to be released in part under the then newly formed Safehouse Records, a partnership between Lovato, and her former manager Phil McIntyre, and Nick Jonas, as a joint venture with Island Records. Lovato stated: "I've worked closely with both Nick and Phil for years and we share the same point of view when it comes to making music. It's incredibly exciting to be part of this new company where I'm in control of all aspects of my career."

== Promotion ==
On September 29, 2015, Lovato sent her fans on a scavenger hunt. Lovato announced that she was hiding special boxes, each on a different location. Each box contained a preview of a song from the album. The first two boxes were found that same day in New York City, the first box contained a snippet of "Stone Cold" while the second contained a snippet of "Old Ways". Lovato performed "Stone Cold" in its entirety later that same day at the Highland Ballroom in New York. On October 17, 2015, Lovato performed a "Cool for the Summer" and "Confident" medley, and "Stone Cold" on Saturday Night Live during the series' forty-first season. On October 22, 2015, Lovato released the music video for the R&B-infused "Waitin for You" featuring Sirah.

Lovato and Nick Jonas announced that they would go on a co-headlining tour, the Future Now Tour, on the Elvis Duran and the Morning Show on October 26, 2015.

Lovato performed on the second edition of the Victoria's Secret Swim Special, which aired on March 9, 2016.

== Singles ==
"Cool for the Summer" reached international success, it was serviced as the lead single from the record on July 1, 2015, it debuted at number 36 on the Billboard Hot 100 in its first week dated July 18, 2015, selling 80,000 copies. It entered the Hot 100's top 20 on the chart dated August 15, 2015 and peaked at number 11. It has since been certified double platinum in the US by the RIAA. The song went top 10 in the UK, New Zealand, Scotland, the Czech Republic, Mexico and Lebanon and top 20 in Canada, Ireland, Australia and Spain.

The title track, "Confident", was released as the second single on September 18, 2015, with the album's pre-order and eventually peaked at number 21 in the US. The song peaked number 1 on US Hot Dance/Club Songs. The music video for "Confident" was released on October 9, 2015, through Lovato's Vevo channel. It went top 20 in the Czech Republic as well as top 30 in Canada, Scotland, New Zealand and Slovakia. The track was certified triple platinum in the United States.

"Stone Cold" was released as the only promotional single from the album on October 9, 2015. On March 21, 2016, the song was released as the third and final single and peaked at number two on the Bubbling Under the Hot 100. It was later certified gold in the United States. The music video for the song was released on February 23, 2016.

== Critical reception ==
Professional ratings
Aggregate scores
Source	Rating
AnyDecentMusic?	5.8/10
Metacritic	74/100
Review scores
Source	Rating
AllMusic	4/5 stars
The A.V. Club	B
Billboard	4.5/5 stars
Entertainment Weekly	B+
Evening Standard	2/5 stars
The Guardian	3/5 stars
Newsday	B+
NME	3/5 stars
Rolling Stone	3.5/5 stars
USA Today	2.5/4 stars

Upon its release, Confident received generally favorable reviews from music critics. Awarding the album four stars at AllMusic, Stephen Thomas Erlewine writing, "the cumulative result is a messy, colorful modern pop record that is greater than the sum of its parts." Annie Zaleski from The A.V. Club gave the album a B+, saying, "Confident is an impressive album by a pop star who knows what she wants—and also knows exactly how to get there." The Guardian gave a mixed review of the album, saying, "Only a certain sheen that turns her vocals into a generic hybrid of Sia and Kelly Clarkson stops Confident from being one of the pop albums of 2015." Nick Levine gave the album 3 out of 5 stars, saying, "It's powerful stuff, especially from a singer who has bravely spoken out about her past struggles with depression, drug and alcohol abuse and an eating disorder, but ultimately Confident feels a bit relentless."

Glenn Gamboa from Newsday gave a more positive review, saying, "On Confident, Lovato's swaggering search for self is remarkably revealing, as she tackles everything from sexual experimentation to mental health issues to her relationship with her estranged father." Writing for Billboard, Maura Johnston gave the album 4.5 out of 5 stars, saying, "[Lovato's] willingness to own every step and misstep, and to show her audience how the rough times helped her become the woman she is, makes Confident a surprisingly compelling listen." Tim Stack from Entertainment Weekly gave the album a B+, saying, "Over 11 tracks Lovato's energy is unwavering, sometimes to a fault. So it's a welcome relief that she takes a moment to reveal a softer side on the gospel-tinged ballad 'Father,' a tear-jerking tribute to her estranged late dad." Richard Godwin from the Evening Standard gave the album a negative review, saying, "[Lovato's] more at home on the ballads such as Lionheart, while Kingdom Come, an atmospheric prowl featuring Iggy Azalea, all moody changes and trap beats, is a welcome respite from a personality record weirdly lacking in personality." Patrick Ryan from USA Today gave the album 2.5 out of 4 stars, saying, "Confident is overall an assured step forward for Lovato, who should only hone her sound and style by the time album No. 6 rolls around."

=== Year-end lists ===
Critic/Publication	List	Rank	Ref.
AllMusic	Best Pop Albums of 2015	No order	
Rolling Stone	20 Best Pop Albums of 2015	15	
Fuse	Top 20 Pop Albums of 2015	17	

=== Accolades ===
Year	Award	Category	Result	Ref.
2017	Grammy Awards	Best Pop Vocal Album	Nominated	

== Commercial performance ==
Confident debuted at number two on the US Billboard 200, with first-week sales of 98,000 units (77,000 in pure album sales), behind Pentatonix's self-titled album. It has since sold over 235,000 copies in the country, and was certified Platinum by the Recording Industry Association of America (RIAA). In the United Kingdom, the album opened at number six on the UK Albums Chart, becoming Lovato's highest-charting album there at the time.

== Track listing ==
Confident – Standard edition
No.	Title	Writer(s)	Producer(s)	Length
1.	"Confident"	Demi Lovato; Max Martin; Savan Kotecha; Ilya Salmanzadeh	Martin; Ilya	3:25
2.	"Cool for the Summer"	Lovato; Kotecha; Martin; Alexander Kronlund; Ali Payami	Martin; Payami	3:34
3.	"Old Ways"	Olivia Waithe; Jason Evigan; Scott Hoffman	Evigan; Babydaddy^{[a]}; Mitch Allan^{[b]}	3:24
4.	"For You"	Johan Carlsson; Dalton Grant; Susan Catanzaro	Carlsson; Payami; Peter Carlsson^{[b]}	3:41
5.	"Stone Cold"	Lovato; Laleh Pourkarim; Gustaf Thörn	Pourkarim	3:11
6.	"Kingdom Come" (featuring Iggy Azalea)	Lovato; Julia Michaels; Steve Mac; Amethyst Amelia Kelly	Mac	4:04
7.	"Waitin for You" (featuring Sirah)	Lovato; Michaels; Evigan; Mac; Sara Mitchell	Evigan; Mac; Allan^{[b]}	3:12
8.	"Wildfire"	Ryan Tedder; Nicole Morier; Tor Erik Hermansen; Mikkel Storleer Eriksen	Stargate; Allan^{[b]}	3:19
9.	"Lionheart"	Mac; Ina Wroldsen	Mac	4:04
10.	"Yes"	Lovato; Pourkarim	Pourkarim; Gustaf Thörn^{[c]}	3:10
11.	"Father"	Lovato; Pourkarim	Pourkarim	3:55
Total length:				38:59

Confident – Deluxe edition (bonus tracks)
No.	Title	Writer(s)	Producer(s)	Length
12.	"Stars"	Lovato; Rami Yacoub; Carl Falk; Kotecha; Kronlund	Falk; Rami	3:08
13.	"Mr. Hughes"	Lovato; J. Carlsson	J. Carlsson; Ilya; P. Carlsson^{[b]}	3:41
14.	"Cool for the Summer" (Jump Smokers Remix)	Lovato; Kotecha; Martin; Kronlund; Payami	Payami; Martin; Jump Smokers^{[d]}	4:25
15.	"Cool for the Summer" (Suraci Remix)	Lovato; Kotecha; Martin; Kronlund; Payami	Payami; Martin; Suraci^{[d]}	4:45
Total length:				54:58

Notes

- ^{^[a]} signifies an additional producer
- ^{^[b]} signifies a vocal producer
- ^{^[c]} signifies an assistant producer
- ^{^[d]} signifies a remixer

== Personnel ==
Credits adapted from the liner notes of the deluxe edition of Confident.

=== Performers and musicians ===
- Demi Lovato – lead vocals, background vocals, piano (tracks 5, 11), keys (track 10)
- Iggy Azalea – vocals (track 6)
- Sirah – vocals (track 7)
- Erik Arvinder – strings (track 11)
- Babydaddy – keys (track 3)
- David Bukovinszky – cello (tracks 4, 13)
- Mattias Bylund – strings (track 4)
- Johan Carlsson – background vocals (tracks 4, 13), keys (tracks 4, 13), guitar (tracks 4, 13), percussion (track 4), bass (track 13)
- Peter Carlsson – live drums (track 1)
- Jason Evigan – keys (track 3), all instrumentation (track 7)
- Carl Falk – background vocals (track 12)
- Colette Falla – background vocals (track 4)
- Staffan Findin – trombone (track 1)
- Kristoffer Fogelmark – background vocals (track 12)
- Livvi Franc – additional background vocals (track 3)
- Paul Gendler – guitar (track 9)
- Rickard Göransson – percussion (track 1)
- Oscar Holter – background vocals (track 1)
- Mattias Johansson – violin (tracks 4, 13)
- Savan Kotecha – background vocals (tracks 1, 2)
- Chris Laws – drums (tracks 6, 9)
- Steve Mac – all keyboards (tracks 6, 9), all instrumentation (track 7)
- Max Martin – keys (track 1), percussion (track 1)
- Eru Matsumoto – cello (track 5)
- Albin Nedler – background vocals (track 12)
- Karl Olandersson – trumpets (track 1)
- Ali Payami – guitar (track 2), drums (track 2), percussion (track 2)
- Stefan Persson – trumpets (track 1)
- Laleh Pourkarim – background vocals (tracks 5, 10, 11), piano (track 5), bass (tracks 5, 11), synth (tracks 5, 10, 11), percussion (track 11), organ (track 11), guitar (track 11)
- Ilya Salmanzadeh – background vocals (track 1), guitar (track 1), bass (track 1), keys (track 1), percussion (track 1), drums (track 13)
- Stargate – all instruments (track 8)
- Ryan Tedder – background vocals (track 8)
- Jonas Thander – saxophone (track 1)
- Gustaf Thörn – background vocals (tracks 5, 10, 11), piano (tracks 5, 11), synth (tracks 5, 11), keys (track 10), organ (tracks 10, 11), bass (track 10)
- Ina Wroldsen – background vocals (track 9)
- Rami Yacoub – background vocals (track 12)

=== Production ===
- Mitch Allan – vocal production (tracks 3, 7, 8)
- Babydaddy – additional production (track 3)
- Spencer Bastian – additional programming (track 3)
- Cory Bice – engineering (track 13)
- Mattias Bylund – string arrangement (tracks 4, 13)
- Johan Carlsson – music production (tracks 4, 13), vocal production (tracks 4, 13), drum programming (track 13)
- Peter Carlsson – vocal production (tracks 4, 13)
- Tom Coyne – mastering
- Jason Evigan – music production (tracks 3, 7)
- Carl Falk – music production (track 12), programming (track 12)
- Serban Ghenea – mixing (tracks 1–7, 9–13)
- Sam Holland – engineering (tracks 1, 2, 4, 13)
- Chris Laws – engineering (tracks 6, 9), additional engineering (track 7)
- Steve Mac – music production (tracks 6, 7, 9)
- Mag – FX programming (track 10), drum programming (track 10)
- Max Martin – music production (tracks 1, 2), programming (track 1), additional programming (track 2)
- Randy Merrill – assistant mastering
- Noah "Mailbox" Passovoy – engineering (track 4)
- Ali Payami – music production (tracks 2, 4), programming (track 2)
- Laleh Pourkarim – music production (tracks 5, 10, 11), vocal production (track 10), cello arrangement (track 5), engineering (tracks 5, 10, 11), drum programming (tracks 5, 10, 11), FX programming (track 10), synth programming (track 11)
- Dann Pursey – engineering (tracks 6, 9)
- Daniela Rivera – additional engineering (track 8), assistant engineering (track 8)
- Ilya Salmanzadeh – music production (tracks 1, 13), programming (track 1), drum programming (track 13)
- Stargate – music production (track 8)
- Phil Tan – mixing (track 8)
- Isaiah Tejada – additional programming (track 3)
- Jonas Thander – horn arrangement (track 1)
- Gustaf Thörn – assistant production (track 10), assistant engineering (tracks 5, 10, 11), string arrangement (track 5), synth programming (track 11)
- Rami Yacoub – music production (track 12), programming (track 12)

=== Design ===
- Sandy Brummels – creative direction
- Jessica Kelly – additional packaging design
- Todd Russell – art direction and design
- Yu Tsai – photography

== Charts ==
=== Weekly charts ===
Weekly chart performance for Confident
Chart (2015–2016)	Peak position
Argentine Albums (CAPIF)	10
Australian Albums (ARIA)	3
Austrian Albums (Ö3 Austria)	19
Belgian Albums (Ultratop Flanders)	3
Belgian Albums (Ultratop Wallonia)	19
Brazilian Albums (ABPD)	2
Canadian Albums (Billboard)	1
Czech Albums (ČNS IFPI)	16
Danish Albums (Hitlisten)	23
Dutch Albums (Album Top 100)	4
French Albums (SNEP)	22
German Albums (Offizielle Top 100)	23
Greek Albums (IFPI)	5
Irish Albums (IRMA)	3
Italian Albums (FIMI)	7
Mexican Albums (Top 100 Mexico)	4
New Zealand Albums (RMNZ)	2
Norwegian Albums (VG-lista)	8
Portuguese Albums (AFP)	6
Scottish Albums (Official Charts)	2
Spanish Albums (Promusicae)	4
Swedish Albums (Sverigetopplistan)	12
Swiss Albums (Schweizer Hitparade)	13
Taiwanese Albums (Five Music)	6
UK Albums (Official Charts)	6
US Billboard 200	2

=== Year-end charts ===
Year-end chart performance for Confident
Chart (2015)	Position
Brazilian Albums Chart	14
Chart (2016)	Position
US Billboard 200	100

== Certifications ==
Certifications and sales for Confident
Region	Certification	Certified units/sales
Brazil (Pro-Música Brasil)	Gold	20,000^{*}
Colombia	Platinum	
Denmark (IFPI Danmark)	Gold	10,000^{^}
Mexico (AMPROFON)	Gold	30,000^{^}
New Zealand (RMNZ)	2× Platinum	30,000^{‡}
Norway (IFPI Norway)	Platinum	20,000^{‡}
Poland (ZPAV)	Gold	10,000^{‡}
United Kingdom (BPI)	Silver	60,000^{‡}
United States (RIAA)	Platinum	1,000,000^{‡}
^{*} Sales figures based on certification alone.^{^} Shipments figures based on certification alone.^{‡} Sales+streaming figures based on certification alone.

== Release history ==
List of release dates, formats, label, editions and reference
Date	Format(s)	Label	Edition(s)	Ref.
October 16, 2015	CD; digital download	Hollywood; Island; Safehouse	Standard; deluxe	
May 14, 2021	Vinyl	Hollywood	Standard	

== See also ==
- List of 2015 albums
- List of number-one albums of 2015 (Canada)
- List of UK top-ten albums in 2015
