= Sorry Not Sorry (Demi Lovato song) =

2017 single by Demi Lovato

Single by Demi Lovato

from the album Tell Me You Love Me
- Released: July 11, 2017
- Studio: Westlake; SuCasa (Los Angeles)
- Genre: Pop; R&B
- Length: 3:23
- Label: Island; Hollywood; Safehouse; Republic
- Songwriters: Demi Lovato; Sean Douglas; Warren "Oak" Felder; Trevor Brown; William Zaire Simmons
- Producers: Oak Felder; "Downtown" Trevor Brown; Zaire Koalo

Demi Lovato singles chronology
"Instruction" (2017)	"Sorry Not Sorry" (2017)	"Tell Me You Love Me" (2017)

Music video
- "Sorry Not Sorry" on YouTube

"Sorry Not Sorry" is a song by American singer Demi Lovato and the lead single from her sixth studio album, Tell Me You Love Me (2017). Island, Hollywood, and Safehouse Records released the song on July 11, 2017. Written by Lovato alongside Sean Douglas, Trevor Brown, William Zaire Simmons, and its producer Oak Felder, it is a pop and R&B track. An acoustic version of the song was present on the deluxe edition of the album. In 2023, a re-recorded version featuring British-American guitarist Slash was released as a promotional single and included on Lovato's first remix album, Revamped.

A music video for "Sorry Not Sorry" was directed by Hannah Lux Davis and premiered on July 19, 2017, through the singer's Vevo channel. Commercially, the song reached the top 10 in Australia, Greece, Hungary, Ireland, New Zealand, the United Kingdom, and the United States while charting within the top 20 in Canada, the Czech Republic, El Salvador, Honduras, Latvia, Norway, Panama, Portugal, Scotland, and Slovakia. It also received multi-platinum certifications from Australia, Brazil, Canada, New Zealand, Norway, the United Kingdom, and the United States.

To promote the song, Lovato performed it at house parties upon its release. She also promoted the song on several television programs such as Good Morning America, The Tonight Show Starring Jimmy Fallon, and The Ellen DeGeneres Show, as well as at the 2017 MTV Video Music Awards and 2017 American Music Awards. It received a nomination for the former in the Song of Summer category and again at the 2018 ceremony in the Best Pop category. "Sorry Not Sorry" was included on the regular set list of the Tell Me You Love Me World Tour (2018), the Holy Fvck Tour (2022), and the It's Not That Deep Tour (2026).

== Background ==
According to Stefan Johnson of the Monsters and the Strangerz, Lovato was conflicted in May 2017 between a track "The Middle" and "Sorry Not Sorry" as the lead single of her sixth studio album, Tell Me You Love Me. Lovato opted for the latter, as she called the former "too pop" and was trying to go "more soulful". The track was eventually recorded by Russian-German record producer Zedd with American duo Grey and American singer Maren Morris.

Lovato told Noisey that she had always wanted "Sorry Not Sorry" to be the lead single, but her inner circle felt the title track was a better choice "because it's emotional—it's vulnerable". Lovato then played both songs to Jay-Z who favored "Sorry Not Sorry" for its lightheartedness, noting that audiences rarely saw Lovato "have fun". His opinion ultimately helped persuade others to choose the song. Oak Felder revealed that the concept of "Sorry Not Sorry" was inspired by a phone conversation with his wife, which Lovato "connected" to because of her past.

== Composition ==
"Sorry Not Sorry" was written by Warren "Oak" Felder, Sean Douglas, Trevor Brown, William Zaire Simmons, and Lovato. The production was handled by Oak with co-production by "Downtown" Trevor Brown and Zaire Koalo. The track was recorded with guidance by Jose Balaguer and Oak in Westlake Recording Studios and SuCasa Recording, respectively, both located in Los Angeles. The engineering of "Sorry Not Sorry" was done by Jose Balaguer, Oak and Chris Galland, added by Nicole "Coco" Llorens and assisted by Keith "Daquan" Sorrells. Manny Marroquin finished the mixing, assisted by Robin Florent and Scott Desmarais. The mastering was done by Chris Gehringer and Will Quinnell at Sterling Sound Studios. All four co-writers provided background vocals. Oak Felder performed the keyboards and also did the arrangement. Felder and Brown programmed the synthesizer, while Koalo programmed the drums.

"Sorry Not Sorry" is a pop and R&B song, running for three minutes and twenty-three seconds. According to Musicnotes.com, which was published by Kobalt Music Publishing America, Inc., the song is written in the key of B minor with a tempo of 144 beats per minute in common time. Lovato's vocal range on the song spans from the low note of A_{3} to the high note of A_{5}.

== Release and promotion ==
On July 5, 2017, Lovato confirmed the release of "Sorry Not Sorry" via an Instagram video, teasing the instrumental of the track. The following day, she posted a video on her Twitter revealing the title "Sorry Not Sorry". Lovato explained to Amazon Music that "Sorry Not Sorry" is a song for the "haters" with the message "You know what? I'm good now, and sorry I'm not sorry that you may not be loving where your life is at the moment."

The accompanying music video was directed by Hannah Lux Davis and released via Vevo on July 19. The video sees Lovato throwing a house party, frolicking by a pool, in an inflatable tub, on an outdoor dance floor, and in a beach chair, as her friends thrash, laugh, and kiss around her. Paris Hilton, Wiz Khalifa and Jamie Foxx have cameo appearances in the video.

=== Live performances ===
Lovato debuted "Sorry Not Sorry" the night before its release at a fan listening party held in Los Angeles. She subsequently performed the song at other house parties. On August 18, 2017, Lovato made the first televised performance of the track on Good Morning America. On August 27, she performed the song in Las Vegas as a pre-recorded performance for the 2017 MTV Video Music Awards. Lovato performed the song on The Tonight Show Starring Jimmy Fallon and The Jonathan Ross Show on September 18 and 30, respectively.

Lovato performed "Sorry Not Sorry" on The Ellen DeGeneres Show on October 4 and on The Today Show a day later, where she also performed "Tell Me You Love Me". On November 12, Lovato performed a medley of both songs at the 2017 MTV Europe Music Awards. Following day, she performed "Sorry Not Sorry" on Live Lounge where she also performed "Skyscraper" and a cover of Sam Smith's "Too Good at Goodbyes", and at the 2017 American Music Awards on November 19. "Sorry Not Sorry" served as the encore to Lovato's sixth headlining concert tour Tell Me You Love Me World Tour.

== Critical reception ==
Elias Leight of Rolling Stone described "Sorry Not Sorry" as a "gleeful revenge on a callous ex" with "heavy rhythmic effects". Christopher Rosa of Glamour felt the song "takes self-empowerment to new heights". Lars Brandle of Billboard wrote it was "bound to be embraced as a girl-power anthem".

=== Recognition ===
"Sorry Not Sorry" was included on several year-end lists. Thrillist ranked it at number eight, while PopMatters ranked the song at number 41. Stereogum's Chris DeVille considered "Sorry Not Sorry" the 18th pop song of the year, writing that "even the firmest gospel-pop foundation will not stop Demi Lovato from blowing your house down every time." Elle magazine's Nerisha Penrose included the track on her list at number 9 and described it as "an infectious, hater-shunning summer anthem will surely shut down all the naysayers." Billboard and American Songwriter ranked the song number four and number one, respectively, on their lists of the 10 greatest Demi Lovato songs. In 2024, Los 40's Redacción 40 Chile included "Sorry Not Sorry" on its list of songs that defined Lovato's career.

"Sorry Not Sorry" received a nomination for the 2017 MTV Video Music Awards in the Song of Summer category and again at the 2018 ceremony in the Best Pop category. American singer and actress Michelle Williams performed the song on the second US series of The Masked Singer.

== Commercial performance ==
In the United States, "Sorry Not Sorry" debuted on the Billboard Hot 100 chart at number 52 on the chart dated July 29, 2017, three days following its release. It sold 42,000 copies in the country and entered the US Digital Song Sales chart at number 9. After its first full week of tracking, the song ascended to number 23 on the Hot 100 with another 43,000 downloads sold, rising to number 6 on the Digital Song Sales chart. "Sorry Not Sorry" fluctuated inside the top thirty over the next four weeks, before entering the top twenty at number 18 in the week dated September 9. After "Sorry Not Sorry" rose to number 13 on the next week, it marked her highest-charting track since "Cool for the Summer". The song spent another four weeks oscillating in the top twenty before entering the top ten at number 10 on the chart dated October 14, marking Lovato's first top ten single since "Heart Attack" (2013). The following week, it rose to number eight, surpassing "This Is Me" to become Lovato's highest-peaking single in the country thus far.

"Sorry Not Sorry" eventually peaked at number six on the chart dated November 11 and spent seven non-consecutive weeks in the top ten and 36 weeks on the chart in total on the Hot 100. It marked Lovato's longest-charting song in the US, overtaking "Give Your Heart a Break", which spent 32 weeks on the chart in 2012. As of August 2021, "Sorry Not Sorry" is Lovato's most-streamed song in the United States amassing 1.040 billion streams and it has since been certified seven-times platinum by the Recording Industry Association of America (RIAA) for sales and streaming units equivalent to seven million, making it her highest-selling song in the country.

"Sorry Not Sorry" also entered the US Mainstream Top 40 chart at number 35 on the week ending August 5, which later peaked atop on the week ending November 4, becoming Lovato's second number-one on the chart. The song also reached number 5 on the Dance/Mix Show Airplay, number 9 on the Adult Top 40, number 19 on the Rhythmic Airplay, and number 22 on the Adult Contemporary charts, respectively; it became Lovato's highest-peaking song on both the Adult Top 40 and the Rhythmic charts. In Canada, "Sorry Not Sorry" peaked at number 18 on the Canadian Hot 100, marking Lovato's sixth top twenty hit in the country, and was later certified triple platinum by Music Canada for sales and streaming units equivalent to 320,000 units.

"Sorry Not Sorry" entered the UK singles chart at number 69. It peaked at number nine in its ninth week, marking Lovato's fifth top ten hit in the country. The song has since been certified multi-platinum by the British Phonographic Industry (BPI) for sales and streaming units equivalent to 1.2 million units in the country. "Sorry Not Sorry" also reached the top ten in Ireland, becoming Lovato's fourth top ten hit in the country, and number 12 in Scotland. Elsewhere in Europe, the track reached the top ten in Greece and Hungary at numbers eight and nine, respectively. It reached number 14 in Latvia, and number 17 in Norway and Portugal. The track additionally entered the top forty in Denmark, Sweden, and the Netherlands.

"Sorry Not Sorry" achieved more success in Australasia. It entered the ARIA Charts in Australia at number 35 on the week ending July 30 and peaked at number eight in its eighth week, marking Lovato's first song to reach the top ten in the country. The song spent 26 weeks on the chart. "Sorry Not Sorry" has since been certified six-times platinum by the Australian Recording Industry Association (ARIA) for sales and streaming units equivalent to 420,000. In New Zealand, the track entered at number 22 and peaked at number six seven weeks later, marking Lovato's sixth top ten hit in the country as well as her highest-charting single to date. It remained in the top ten for eight consecutive weeks. "Sorry Not Sorry" was later certified quadruple platinum by the Recorded Music NZ (RMNZ) for sales and streaming units equivalent to 120,000 units. The track was certified 2× Diamond in Brazil, and earned additional platinum or higher certifications in Norway, Denmark, Italy, Mexico, Portugal, and Sweden, as well as gold certifications in Germany and Spain.

== Track listings ==
- Digital download
1. "Sorry Not Sorry" – 3:23
- Digital download – Freedo remix
1. "Sorry Not Sorry" (Freedo remix) – 3:44
- Digital download – Acoustic version
14. "Sorry Not Sorry" (acoustic version) – 3:25

== Credits and personnel ==
Credits were adapted from the liner notes of Tell Me You Love Me.

=== Recording and management ===
- Recorded at Westlake Recording Studios and SuCasa Recording Studios (Los Angeles, California)
- Mixed at Larrabee Studios (North Hollywood, California)
- Mastered at Sterling Sound Studios (New York City)
- Published by DDLovato Music/Universal Music Corp. (ASCAP), Sony/ATV (BMI), Sony/ATV (BMI), Trevor Brown Publishing Designee (ASCAP), Quest Da Stars (ASCAP)

=== Personnel ===
- Demi Lovato – lead vocals, composition
- Oak Felder – composition, background vocals, production, additional record engineering, keyboard arrangement, synthesizer programming
- "Downtown" Trevor Brown – composition, background vocals, co-production, synthesizer programming
- Zaire Koalo – composition, background vocals, co-production, drum programming
- Sean Douglas – composition, background vocals
- Jose Balaguer – recording
- Nicole "Coco" Llorens – additional engineering
- Keith "Daquan" Sorrells – engineering assistance
- Manny Marroquin – mixing
- Chris Galland – mix engineering
- Robin Florent – mix assistance
- Scott Desmarais – mix assistance
- Chris Gehringer – mastering
- Will Quinnell – mastering

== Charts ==
=== Weekly charts ===
Chart (2017–2018)	Peak position
Australia (ARIA)	8
Austria (Ö3 Austria Top 40)	45
Belgium (Ultratip Bubbling Under Flanders)	2
Belgium (Ultratip Bubbling Under Wallonia)	1
Canada Hot 100 (Billboard)	18
Canada AC (Billboard)	38
Canada CHR/Top 40 (Billboard)	7
Canada Hot AC (Billboard)	8
Croatia International Airplay (Top lista)	73
Czech Republic Airplay (ČNS IFPI)	71
Czech Republic Singles Digital (ČNS IFPI)	18
Denmark (Tracklisten)	33
Dominican Anglo (Monitor Latino)	9
El Salvador (Monitor Latino)	18
Euro Digital Song Sales (Billboard)	18
Ecuador Anglo (Monitor Latino)	13
Finnish Download (IFPI Finland)	28
France (SNEP)	86
Germany (GfK)	62
Greece International (IFPI)	14
Greece (Greece Digital Songs)	8
Guatemala Anglo (Monitor Latino)	7
Honduras (Monitor Latino)	18
Hungary (Single Top 40)	9
Hungary (Stream Top 40)	59
Ireland (IRMA)	8
Israel International TV Airplay (Media Forest)	3
Italy (FIMI)	58
Latvia (Latvijas Top 40)	14
Malaysia International (RIM)	1
Mexico (Billboard Inglés Airplay)	36
Mexico Anglo (Monitor Latino)	15
Netherlands (Single Top 100)	39
New Zealand (Recorded Music NZ)	6
Norway (VG-lista)	17
Panama (Monitor Latino)	20
Philippines (Philippine Hot 100)	31
Portugal (AFP)	17
Scottish Singles Sales (Official Charts)	12
Slovakia Airplay (ČNS IFPI)	95
Slovakia Singles Digital (ČNS IFPI)	20
Spain (PROMUSICAE)	70
Sweden (Sverigetopplistan)	34
Switzerland (Schweizer Hitparade)	47
UK Singles (Official Charts)	9
US Billboard Hot 100	6
US Adult Contemporary (Billboard)	22
US Adult Pop Airplay (Billboard)	9
US Dance Airplay (Billboard)	5
US Pop Airplay (Billboard)	1
US Rhythmic Airplay (Billboard)	19
Venezuela Anglo (Monitor Latino)	14

=== Year-end charts ===
Chart (2017)	Position
Australia (ARIA)	43
Brazil (Pro-Música Brasil)	76
Canada (Canadian Hot 100)	51
El Salvador (Monitor Latino)	37
Hungary (Stream Top 40)	59
Latvia Airplay (LaIPA)	74
New Zealand (Recorded Music NZ)	47
Portugal (AFP)	58
UK Singles (Official Charts Company)	82
US Billboard Hot 100	47
US Mainstream Top 40 (Billboard)	29

Chart (2018)	Position
Portugal Streaming (AFP)	199
US Billboard Hot 100	64
US Adult Top 40 (Billboard)	41
US Mainstream Top 40 (Billboard)	48

== Certifications ==
Region	Certification	Certified units/sales
Australia (ARIA)	6× Platinum	420,000^{‡}
Brazil (Pro-Música Brasil)	2× Diamond	320,000^{‡}
Canada (Music Canada)	3× Platinum	240,000^{‡}
Denmark (IFPI Danmark)	Platinum	90,000^{‡}
Germany (BVMI)	Gold	200,000^{‡}
Italy (FIMI)	Platinum	50,000^{‡}
Mexico (AMPROFON)	Platinum	60,000^{‡}
New Zealand (RMNZ)	4× Platinum	120,000^{‡}
Norway (IFPI Norway)	2× Platinum	120,000^{‡}
Portugal (AFP)	Platinum	10,000^{‡}
Spain (Promusicae)	Gold	30,000^{‡}
United Kingdom (BPI)	2× Platinum	1,200,000^{‡}
United States (RIAA)	7× Platinum	7,000,000^{‡}
Streaming
Sweden (GLF)	Platinum	8,000,000^{†}
^{‡} Sales+streaming figures based on certification alone.^{†} Streaming-only figures based on certification alone.

== Release history ==
Region	Date	Format(s)	Version	Label(s)	Ref.
Various	July 11, 2017	Digital download	Original	Island; Hollywood; Safehouse	
United States	July 18, 2017	Contemporary hit radio	Original	Republic	
United Kingdom	July 22, 2017	Contemporary hit radio	Original	Island	
Various	August 11, 2017	Digital download	Freedo remix	Island; Hollywood; Safehouse	
Italy	September 1, 2017	Contemporary hit radio	Original	Universal	

== "Sorry Not Sorry" (rock version) ==
"Sorry Not Sorry" (rock version)

Promotional single by Demi Lovato featuring Slash

from the album Revamped
- Released: July 14, 2023
- Studio: SuCasa (Los Angeles, California)
- Genre: Stadium rock
- Length: 3:34
- Label: DLG; Island
- Songwriters: Demi Lovato; Sean Douglas; Trevor Brown; Warren "Oak" Felder; Zaire Koalo
- Producers: Warren "Oak" Felder; Alex Niceforo; Keith Sorrells; Trevor Brown; Zaire Koalo

Lyric video
- "Sorry Not Sorry" (rock version) on YouTube

In January 2022, Lovato held a "funeral" for her pop music ahead of the release of her eighth studio album, Holy Fvck, in August of that year. The album, which embraced a heavier rock sound that departed from the pop sound of Lovato's previous releases, was supported by the Holy Fvck Tour. The setlist included several rock versions of her older pop songs, including "Sorry Not Sorry".

On March 24, 2023, Lovato released a rock version of her song "Heart Attack" to mark the song's 10th anniversary. On May 18, she announced via social media that she would release a rock version of "Cool for the Summer", which was released a week after. "Sorry Not Sorry (Rock Version)", which featured a guitar solo from British-American musician Slash, was announced on July 10 and released four days after. The stadium rock song was recorded at SuCasa Studios located in Los Angeles, California. The updated take on the song offers "powerful new vocals" and new production from Warren "Oak" Felder, Keith "Ten4" Sorrells, and Alex Niceforo. Discussing the track, Lovato said: "Slash is an iconic artist who I've been a fan of for years, it's an absolute honour to have such a legend like him on the rock version of 'Sorry Not Sorry'."

=== Charts ===
Chart (2023)	Peak position
US Hard Rock Digital Song Sales (Billboard)	5
