= Tell Me You Love Me (song) =

2017 single by Demi Lovato

- Remixes EP cover

Single by Demi Lovato

from the album Tell Me You Love Me
- Released: November 14, 2017
- Recorded: 2017
- Studio: Rodeo Recordings; (Santa Monica, California); Venice Way Studios; (North Vancouver, British Columbia); Jungle City Studios; (New York City)
- Genre: Pop; R&B
- Length: 3:57
- Label: Hollywood; Island; Safehouse
- Composers: Kirby Lauryen; Ajay Bhattacharya; John Hill
- Lyricist: Lauryen
- Producers: Stint; John Hill

Demi Lovato singles chronology
"Sorry Not Sorry" (2017)	"Tell Me You Love Me" (2017)	"Échame la Culpa" (2017)

Music video
- "Tell Me You Love Me" on YouTube

"Tell Me You Love Me" is a song recorded by American singer Demi Lovato. It was written by Kirby Lauryen, Stint and John Hill, with production handled by the latter two. The track was initially released through Hollywood, Island and Safehouse Records on August 24, 2017, as the first promotional single from Lovato's sixth studio album of the same name (2017). It was released as the second and final single from the album on November 14, 2017. Lyrically, the song uses relationship metaphors to reference theme of self-respect.

"Tell Me You Love Me" received acclaim from music critics, who praised its production and Lovato's vocals. The song impacted hot adult contemporary radios on January 22, 2018. Commercially, the song reached the top 40 in Canada and the top 20 in Panama. In 2023, the song was re-recorded for her first remix album Revamped.

== Production ==
"Tell Me You Love Me" was written by Kirby Lauryen, Stint and John Hill for Lovato's sixth studio album of the same name. It was produced by Stint and Hill. Both producers performed the instruments for the song, including bass, drums, guitar, horn, and piano. Mitch Allan also served as its vocal producer, with Scott Robinson contributing as the additional vocal producer. The song features backing vocals by Lauryen. It was recorded and edited with guidance by Rob Cohen at Rodeo Recordings, located in Santa Monica, California and Venice Way Studios in North Vancouver, Canada. Lovato recorded the vocals for the song with guidance by Zeke Mishanec at Jungle City Studios in New York City. The song was engineered for mix by John Hanes, and eventually mixed by Serban Ghenea. It was finally mastered by Chris Gehringer and Will Quinnell.

During the album pop-up exhibition in New York City, Lovato revealed that the song was "really stuck" with her when she heard it for the first time. She explained, "At the time I was going through a breakup. It's about the vulnerability of coming out of a very serious relationship and having a tough time with it. It also at the same time calls out a big misconception with the line, 'You ain't nobody 'til you got somebody,' which again comes from that vulnerability with mixed emotions." In an interview with the BBC, Lovato named "Tell Me You Love Me" as her favorite track on the album, later explaining that "It said exactly what I was wanting to tell that person. I wanted to hear them tell me that they loved me."

== Release ==
Lovato published a black-and-white teaser on August 23, 2017, on social media, announcing the new album, with "Tell Me You Love Me" playing in the background. The clip shows Lovato singing the song in a studio, as it fades into the album artwork. It was released to radio as the album's second and final single from the album on November 14, 2017. An official remix of the song by NOTD was released on December 15, 2017. The second official remix of the song by American electronic musician Dave Audé was released on January 5, 2018. On March 8, 2018, Lovato released a remix extended play, featuring the original version of the track, the two previous remixes, Spanglish and Spanish versions and a live acoustic performance. On March 23, 2018, the EP was re-released, and one remix of the song by Matrix & Futurebound was released.

== Composition ==
"Tell Me You Love Me" is written in the key of E♭ minor with a tempo of 72 beats per minute in common time. The song follows a chord progression of E♭m–D♭–C♭, and Lovato's vocal range spans from the low note of A♭_{3} to the high note of G♯_{5}.

== Critical reception ==
"Tell Me You Love Me" received acclaim from music critics, who mostly complimented its production and Lovato's vocals. Elias Leight of Rolling Stone called the song "a swelling ballad full of horns and handclaps". Mike Wass of Idolator described the song as "a fiery mid-tempo anthem". Jeff Benjamin of Fuse called the song a "booming ballad". Deepa Lakshmin of MTV News described Lovato's vocals as "sweeping". Raisa Bruner of Time described the song as a "lush and dramatic love song" that had "powerful hand-clap chorus and big horns". While reviewing the album, Jamieson Cox of Pitchfork described the song as "a desperate plea for affection that gradually morphs into a declaration of self-love".

== Music video ==
=== Background and synopsis ===
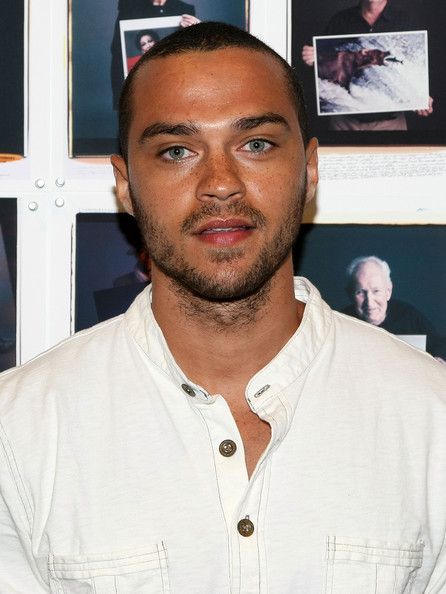
Actor Jesse Williams starred as Lovato's love interest.

The music video for "Tell Me You Love Me" was directed by Mark Pellington, who had previously worked with Lovato on the video for her 2011 single "Skyscraper". The video co-starred actor Jesse Williams. About filming the music video, Lovato commented, "[Shooting the music video] was really fun too! We had a full on wedding and my best friends were even my bridesmaids and groomsmen."

The music video is six minutes and forty-seven seconds long. The first two minutes of the video are dedicated to the couple's engagement as well as the jealousies that strain their relationship before their wedding. The track eventually begins during the wedding sequence where, after a few suspenseful moments, Williams' groom tells Lovato's bride he is not ready and leaves her at the altar to the shock of their family and friends. The video ends with Lovato singing "Everything I need, is standing right in front of me, I know that we will be alright, alright" as she stands in front of a mirror.

=== Release and reception ===
On November 22, 2017, Lovato posted a photo of herself in a wedding dress on her social media with no description. Rumors of the possibility of the photo being a sneak peek from the music video were made on social media. On November 27, 2017, Lovato announced that the official music video for the song would be released on December 1, 2017, by posting a wedding invitation from Lovato and Williams. According to Island Records' president David Massey, the music video reached 10 million views on its first day.

Megan Armstrong of Billboard praised Lovato and Williams' acting performances, saying they "make it hard to believe they aren't actually a couple in real life." Markos Papadatos of Digital Journal said the music video was "superb from start to finish" and called it one of Lovato's "most compelling videos". Sara M Moniuszko of USA Today praised the music video as one that "perfectly matches the emotional and longing lyrics of the track." Kaitlyn Tiffany of The Verge described the video as "a Lifetime movie you can watch at your desk".

== Live performances ==
On October 5, 2017, the singer performed the song for the first time on television on The Today Show, where she also performed "Sorry Not Sorry". On November 10, 2017, Lovato performed the song at BBC's Sounds Like Friday Night. On November 12, 2017, Lovato performed a medley of "Sorry Not Sorry" and "Tell Me You Love Me" at the 2017 MTV Europe Music Awards. The song was on Lovato's set list for the 2017 Jingle Ball Tour. On December 19, 2017, Lovato performed the song on the live finale of The Voice. Lovato performed the track on The Ellen DeGeneres Show on January 15, 2018. The song serves as the encore to the Tell Me You Love Me World Tour, where Lovato sings accompanied by a guest choir while confetti is raining down. Lovato later included the song on the set list of the It's Not That Deep Tour (2026).

== Track listings ==
- Digital download
2. "Tell Me You Love Me" – 3:56
- Digital download – NOTD Remix
1. "Tell Me You Love Me" (NOTD Remix) – 3:00
- Digital download – Dave Audé Remix
1. "Tell Me You Love Me" (Dave Audé Remix) – 3:45
- Digital download – Remixes
1. "Tell Me You Love Me" – 3:56
2. "Tell Me You Love Me" (Dave Audé Remix) – 3:46
3. "Tell Me You Love Me" (NOTD Remix) – 3:01
4. "Tell Me You Love Me" (Spanglish Version) – 3:57
5. "Tell Me You Love Me" (Spanish Version) – 3:58
6. "Tell Me You Love Me" (Live Acoustic) – 2:37
7. "Tell Me You Love Me" (Recorded at Spotify Studios NYC) – 4:07
8. "Ain't No Way" (Recorded at Spotify Studios NYC) – 4:10
9. "Tell Me You Love Me" (Matrix & Futurebound Remix) – 3:28

== Credits and personnel ==
Recording and management

- Recorded at Rodeo Recordings (Santa Monica, California) and Venice Way Studios (North Vancouver, BC, Canada)
- Vocals recorded at Jungle City Studios (New York City)
- Mixed at MixStar Studios (Virginia Beach, Virginia)
- Mastered at Sterling Sound Studios (New York City)
- Published by Rodeoman Music (GMR), EMI April Music, WB Music Corp. (ASCAP), Roc Nation Music (ASCAP), A Song A Day (ASCAP), Stint Music Publishing (SOCAN)

Personnel

- Demi Lovato – lead vocals
- John Hill – production, bass, drums, guitar, horn, piano, programming
- Stint – production, bass, drums, guitar, horn, piano, programming
- Mitch Allan – vocal production
- Scott Robinson – additional vocal production
- Rob Cohen – recording, editing
- Zeke Mishanec – vocals recording
- Serban Ghenea – mixing
- John Hanes – mixing engineering
- Dave Palmer – keyboards
- Kirby Lauryen – background vocals
- Chris Gehringer – mastering
- Will Quinnell – mastering

Credits adapted from the liner notes of Tell Me You Love Me.

== Charts ==
=== Weekly charts ===
Chart (2017–2018)	Peak position
Belgium (Ultratip Bubbling Under Flanders)	15
Canada Hot 100 (Billboard)	32
Canada CHR/Top 40 (Billboard)	45
Czech Republic Singles Digital (ČNS IFPI)	50
France (SNEP)	185
Germany (GfK)	91
Greece International (IFPI)	41
Ireland (IRMA)	92
Israel International TV Airplay (Media Forest)	3
Latvia (DigiTop100)	58
New Zealand Heatseekers (RMNZ)	6
Panama (Monitor Latino)	14
Philippines (Philippine Hot 100)	74
Portugal (AFP)	46
Scottish Singles Sales (Official Charts)	58
Slovakia Airplay (ČNS IFPI)	85
Slovakia Singles Digital (ČNS IFPI)	52
Sweden Heatseeker (Sverigetopplistan)	6
UK Singles (Official Charts)	85
US Billboard Hot 100	53
US Adult Pop Airplay (Billboard)	36
US Dance Club Songs (Billboard)	2
US Dance Airplay (Billboard)	39
US Pop Airplay (Billboard)	19

=== Year-end charts ===
Chart (2018)	position
Portugal (AFP)	185
US Dance Club Songs (Billboard)	22

== Certifications ==
Region	Certification	Certified units/sales
Australia (ARIA)	Platinum	70,000^{‡}
Brazil (Pro-Música Brasil)	3× Platinum	120,000^{‡}
Canada (Music Canada)	2× Platinum	160,000^{‡}
New Zealand (RMNZ)	Platinum	30,000^{‡}
Norway (IFPI Norway)	Gold	30,000^{‡}
Portugal	—	4,557
United Kingdom (BPI)	Silver	200,000^{‡}
United States (RIAA)	2× Platinum	2,000,000^{‡}
^{‡} Sales+streaming figures based on certification alone.

== Release history ==
Region	Date	Format(s)	Version	Label(s)	Ref.
Various	August 24, 2017 (Note: Release as a promotional single.)	Digital download	Original	Island; Hollywood; Safehouse	
United States	November 14, 2017	Contemporary hit radio	Original	Island; Hollywood	
Various	December 15, 2017	Digital download	NOTD Remix	Island; Hollywood; Safehouse	
Italy	December 29, 2017	Contemporary hit radio	Original	Universal	
Various	January 5, 2018	Digital download	Dave Audé Remix	Island; Hollywood; Safehouse	
United States	January 22, 2018	Hot adult contemporary	Original	Island; Hollywood	
Various	March 8, 2018	Digital download	Remixes EP	Island; Hollywood; Safehouse	
Various	March 23, 2018	Digital download	Remixes EP (re-release)	Island; Hollywood; Safehouse	
