= Tell Me You Love Me World Tour =

2018 concert tour by Demi Lovato

- Transcontinental tour by Demi Lovato
- Location: Europe; North America
- Associated album: Tell Me You Love Me
- Start date: February 26, 2018
- End date: July 22, 2018
- Legs: 3
- No. of shows: 44
- Supporting acts: DJ Khaled; Kehlani; Joy; Jax Jones; St. Vincent; Kamasi Washington; Iggy Azalea
- Attendance: 481,795
- Box office: $24.1 million

Demi Lovato concert chronology
- Future Now Tour (2016); Tell Me You Love Me World Tour (2018); Holy Fvck Tour (2022)

The Tell Me You Love Me World Tour was the sixth headlining concert tour and third worldwide tour by American singer Demi Lovato, in support of her (Note: Lovato uses both she/her and they/them pronouns. This article uses she/her pronouns for consistency.) sixth studio album Tell Me You Love Me (2017). The tour began on February 26, 2018, in San Diego, California and concluded on July 22, 2018, in Paso Robles, California. It was supported by DJ Khaled, Kehlani and Iggy Azalea in North America and Jax Jones and Joy in Europe. The tour was initially supposed to conclude in November 2018 in Fortaleza, Brazil, but the remainder of the tour was cancelled after Lovato was hospitalized for a drug overdose on July 24, 2018 and entered rehab and treatment thereafter. Comprising 44 dates, the tour grossed $24.1 million and had a total attendance of 481,795.

== Development ==
On October 26, 2017, Lovato first announced she was going to tour in 2018 with a special guest. Later that day, she revealed the special guest was DJ Khaled. During the American Music Awards 2017 backstage, Lovato announced that American R&B singer Kehlani would be joining Lovato and Khaled on the tour as the opening act. In an interview with Billboard, Lovato revealed the reason she chose the opening acts was that Kehlani inspired Tell Me You Love Me and DJ Khaled was "much fun to watch". Lovato announced on Good Morning America that her co-owned mental health program CAST Centers would return to join her on tour to provide free therapy sessions and wellness workshops after joining their co-headlining Future Now Tour in 2016. The session also featured guest speakers, including Lovato herself, DJ Khaled in Las Vegas date, Iggy Azalea during the Brooklyn stop, Kelsea Ballerini in Nashville and Lauren Jauregui in Miami.

On February 12, 2018, Lovato revealed the European tour dates, which were scheduled to start in May 2018. This marked the singer's first European concert since a festival appearance during the French NRJ Music Tour in 2015. Three days later, on February 15, 2018, Latin American dates were announced in Brazil, Argentina, Chile, Ecuador, Costa Rica and Mexico. The Panama City date was announced on March 7. They were expected to take place in April and early May, but due to production issues, Lovato announced on April 10 that eight dates of the leg in Latin America were rescheduled, while the planned shows in Panama, Ecuador and Costa Rica were cancelled. Additional dates in Amsterdam, Belfast, Dublin and Newcastle were announced on March 13. Lovato added two festival appearances in England and Wales on April 4 and 5, 2018. On April 6, 2018, Lovato announced a show in Paso Robles, in which Australian rapper Iggy Azalea would join her as the opening act. On May 8, Lovato announced that English record producer Jax Jones would join her in United Kingdom dates as the supporting act. On May 21, it was announced that Lovato would take the stage in Atlantic City, with Lauv as an opening act. On May 23, Lovato announced that Australian singer and record producer Joy would support the European leg. On June 5, 2018, Becky G was announced as the opening act in Argentina and Brazil dates. About being the supporting act, Becky G told Billboard that it would be "awesome" to join Lovato on tour. She later explained that it was their second time being Lovato's supporting act since 2014 Demi World Tour and commented that she learned much from Lovato at that time. Mexican singer Jorge Blanco was announced as the opening act for the Mexican dates. On July 24, after an hospitalization, it was announced that Lovato would not perform at the show at Atlantic City, which was scheduled to take place on July 26. After speculation, on August 8, it was announced that the shows in Chile, Argentina and Brazil were cancelled due to health issues. The next day, it was announced that the shows in Mexico were also cancelled due to the same reason.

Lovato told Billboard that the tour would have "a lot more production". "It will represent who I am as a person and an artist and I can't wait for this country to see it," she added. Lovato also aimed to take an intimate experience on the tour. "I'm going to utilize the arenas and really make sure that from every seat, you get to see my performance up close and personal, as much as we possibly can," she said. Rehearsals for the tour took place at Sleep Train Arena in Sacramento, California.

== Concert synopsis ==
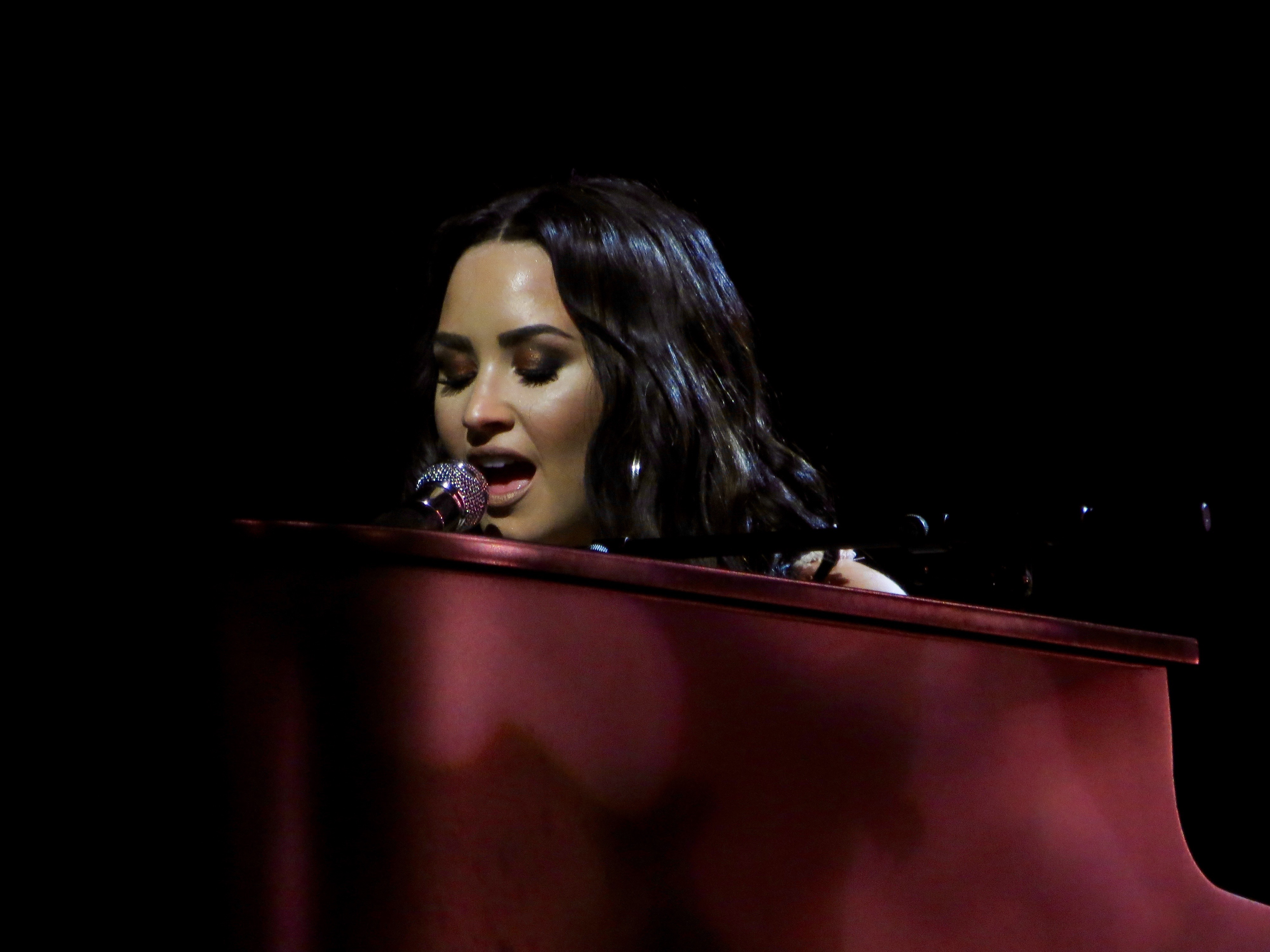
Lovato performing in June 2018

On the North American leg of the tour, the show is divided into five parts and an encore. The show begins with a montage of the tour's video interludes. Lovato rises from a hole in the floor, performing "You Don't Do It for Me Anymore" in a getup of a black dress and a trench coat. An interlude is played, which features the singer portraying both mental health professional and patient. She then appears on stage laying on a psychiatrist couch in a black leather bodysuit and thigh-high pointed boots, performing "Daddy Issues". Lovato performs "Cool for the Summer", accompanied by the eleven dancers performing same-sex erotic moves. The female dancers do synchronized chair-dancing while Lovato performs "Sexy Dirty Love", followed by "Heart Attack" with the male dancers breakdance. "Give Your Heart a Break" is then sung, backed by a kiss cam.

The next segment of the show is introduced with a video interlude showing the singer training mixed martial arts under UFC fighter Randy Couture. Lovato and her dancers walk through the crowd to the stage in a pink boxer robe, then performs "Confident". She uses "everywhere at once" trick during the "Games" performance; the female dancers dress exactly like Lovato in black robe, then are arrayed across the venue. She vanishes during the performance and immediately appears in a white lingerie on a white, rotating bed on the B-stage. Lovato performs "Concentrate" while sitting down on the bed and playing an electric guitar. Lovato is, then, joined by dancers to perform "Cry Baby" and "Lonely"

The next segment sees Lovato, wearing a royal blue oversized hoodie and blue satin ankle boots, singing "No Promises" and "Échame la Culpa"; the latter features Luis Fonsi in video screen. A video interlude showing Lovato's philanthropist work with CAST Center is shown. She also usually talks about her struggles with addictions and mental health before performing a piano version of "Warrior", "Father" and "Smoke & Mirrors", wearing a white bodysuit.

A final video interlude shows a compilation of hate tweets towards Lovato is shown in video screen. The encore begins with the singer, accompanied by guest choir to perform "Sorry Not Sorry". The show ends with "Tell Me You Love Me", while confetti rains down and Lovato disappears through the hole on the stage.

== Critical reception ==
=== North America ===
Jim Harrington from Mercury News reviewed the show at SAP Center, saying Lovato was "in good form" throughout the show and called the "Warrior" performance as a highlight. Jason Bracelin of Las Vegas Review-Journal called the show as a "night of full-throated pop pathos" and praised Lovato for sharing her emotional struggles during the concert. Similar thoughts were echoed by Ashley Naftule of Phoenix New Times who observed the inspirational speech during the "Warrior" performance. "Not only could [Lovato] do pull off half a dozen costume changes, dance, sing her ass off, play the piano, and run around the arena like she was on a treasure hunt, Lovato could also deliver inspirational talks that were meaningful and moving," she wrote. Gatini Tinsley of News-Herald wrote that Lovato "proved to be all fans need" and called the "Father" performance as the "emotional high point of the show". Toronto Star's Nick Krewen rated the concert 3 stars out of 4, observing that "Lovato mesmerized the audience by every word and action". Reviewing the show at Wells Fargo Center, Matt Smith of NJ.com praised Lovato's vocal performance and compared them to Ariana Grande as "the 2010s-era pop generation's most versatile and powerful vocalists." Celia Almeida of Miami New Times highlighted the "Father" performance and compared the B-stage set to Madonna's Blond Ambition World Tour (1990).

In less favorable reviews, Taylor Frantum of Dallas Observer stated that the performances were "well executed" and went off without any hitch, but criticized the visual backdrops calling them "hollow" and "uninspired". Jon Bream of Star Tribune criticized Lovato's stage presence, saying "she did not have a strong physical presence, she did not fill the room." Writers of Creative Loafing noted that Lovato "could put on a great show vocally" but noticed her lack of energy during the Tampa show.

=== Europe ===
Ed Power of Metro Newspaper rated the show in Dublin four out of five stars, and called Lovato "brought a lump to the throat and a tear to the eye". Caroline Sullivan from The Guardian gave the show in London four out of five stars. Calling the show "vulnerable but resolute", she writes: "...it would be a flinty onlooker who wasn't at least a little swayed by her commitment to telling 'my truth'." Vicky Townsend of East Anglian Daily Times described the show in Newmarket as "spine-tinglingly" and "breath-takingly brilliant", praised Lovato's vocal performance. Bert Hertogs of Concert News Belgium reviewed the show in Antwerp and rated the show three and a half stars. Hertogs praised Lovato's vocal performance but criticized the sexual elements of the show, calling it "outright" and "reprehensible". David Pollock of The Scotsman described the show in Glasgow as "a production focused upon a [person] with a particular brand of star quality which is rather being as much like her audience as possible." Reviewing the show in Stockholm, Natasha Azarmi of Aftonbladet gave a mixed review and called the show was "between mediocre and magic".

== Commercial performance ==
According to Billboard Boxscore, the North American leg of the tour generated $20 million in ticket sales and played to 260,763 fans over 20 shows. The highest grossing show of the leg was at the Barclays Center in Brooklyn, playing for 15,249 and grossing $1.5 million. Washington D.C.'s Capital One Arena drew the largest crowd of the leg with a total of 16,141 tickets were sold.

The Tell Me You Love Me World Tour ranked at #71 on Pollstar's 2018 Year-End Top 100 North American Tours chart with a total gross of $17.8 million.

== Set list ==
This set list is from the concert on March 10, 2018, in Minneapolis, Minnesota. It is not intended to represent all tour dates.

1. "You Don't Do It for Me Anymore"
2. "Daddy Issues"
3. "Cool for the Summer"
4. "Sexy Dirty Love"
5. "Heart Attack" (Shortened)
6. "Give Your Heart a Break" (Shortened)
7. "Confident"
8. "Games"
9. "Concentrate"
10. "Cry Baby"
11. "Lonely"
12. "No Promises"
13. "Échame la Culpa"
14. "Warrior"
15. "Father"
16. "Smoke & Mirrors"

Encore

17. "Sorry Not Sorry"
18. "Tell Me You Love Me"

=== Notes ===
- During the shows in San Diego and Inglewood, Lovato performed "Yes".
- During the European leg, "Games" and "Smoke & Mirrors" were replaced with "Solo" and "Fall in Line", respectively.
- During the show in Manchester, Lovato performed "Skyscraper", in place of "Father", as tribute to the victims of the Manchester Arena bombing.
- During the shows in London and Birmingham, Lovato performed "Sober" in place of "Father".

== Tour dates ==
List of 2018 concerts
Date	City	Country	Venue	Opening act(s)	Attendance	Revenue
February 26, 2018	San Diego	United States	Viejas Arena	DJ Khaled; Kehlani	7,967 / 7,967	$612,007
February 28, 2018	San Jose	United States	SAP Center	DJ Khaled; Kehlani	12,371 / 12,743	$967,760
March 2, 2018	Inglewood (Note: Promoted as Los Angeles.)	United States	The Forum	DJ Khaled; Kehlani	14,436 / 14,436	$1,224,291
March 3, 2018	Paradise (Note: Promoted as Las Vegas.)	United States	MGM Grand Garden Arena	DJ Khaled; Kehlani	11,133 / 11,675	$720,336
March 4, 2018	Phoenix	United States	Talking Stick Resort Arena	DJ Khaled; Kehlani	12,490 / 13,529	$881,124
March 7, 2018	Dallas	United States	American Airlines Center	DJ Khaled; Kehlani	15,352 / 15,581	$1,176,161
March 9, 2018	Rosemont	United States	Allstate Arena	DJ Khaled; Kehlani	13,554 / 13,554	$1,157,501
March 10, 2018	Minneapolis	United States	Target Center	DJ Khaled; Kehlani	10,695 / 13,180	$716,150
March 13, 2018	Detroit	United States	Little Caesars Arena	Kehlani	12,955 / 14,541	$889,170
March 14, 2018	Columbus	United States	Schottenstein Center	DJ Khaled; Kehlani	12,615 / 12,615	$952,625
March 16, 2018	New York City (Note: Promoted as Brooklyn.)	United States	Barclays Center	DJ Khaled; Kehlani	15,249 / 15,249	$1,577,852
March 17, 2018	Montreal	Canada	Bell Centre	DJ Khaled; Kehlani	8,244 / 9,700	$559,329
March 19, 2018	Toronto	Canada	Air Canada Centre	DJ Khaled; Kehlani	13,372 / 15,361	$936,240
March 23, 2018	Philadelphia	United States	Wells Fargo Center	DJ Khaled; Kehlani	13,946 / 14,075	$1,081,723
March 24, 2018	Washington, D.C.	United States	Capital One Arena	DJ Khaled; Kehlani	16,141 / 16,141	$1,328,860
March 26, 2018	Boston	United States	TD Garden	DJ Khaled; Kehlani	14,011 / 14,011	$1,197,312
March 28, 2018	Nashville	United States	Bridgestone Arena	DJ Khaled; Kehlani	15,269 / 15,452	$1,049,797
March 30, 2018	Miami	United States	American Airlines Arena	DJ Khaled; Kehlani	12,377 / 12,377	$938,395
March 31, 2018	Tampa	United States	Amalie Arena	DJ Khaled; Kehlani	14,863 / 14,863	$1,129,217
April 2, 2018 (Note: The concert on April 2, 2018 at Prudential Center in Newark was originally scheduled to take place on March 21, but was rescheduled due to extreme weather conditions.)	Newark	United States	Prudential Center	Kehlani	13,723 / 13,723	$1,052,440
May 24, 2018	Belfast	Northern Ireland	SSE Arena	Joy	6,323 / 6,552	$330,470
May 25, 2018	Dublin	Ireland	3Arena	Joy	4,591 / 5,000	$297,651
May 27, 2018 (Note: The concert on May 27, 2018 at Singleton Park in Swansea is part of BBC Music's Biggest Weekend.)	Swansea	Wales	Singleton Park	—N/a	—N/a	—N/a
May 28, 2018 (Note: The concert on May 28, 2018 at Lotto Arena in Antwerp was originally scheduled for May 29, but was rescheduled due to logistical reasons.)	Antwerp	Belgium	Lotto Arena	Joy	6,787 / 6,787	$287,736
May 30, 2018	Copenhagen	Denmark	Forum Copenhagen	Joy	3,172 / 3,172	$185,425
June 1, 2018	Oslo	Norway	Oslo Spektrum	Joy	7,191 / 7,650	$414,322
June 2, 2018	Stockholm	Sweden	Annexet	Joy	2,984 / 2,984	$179,008
June 4, 2018	Paris	France	Zénith Paris	Joy	6,049 / 6,110	$339,803
June 6, 2018 (Note: The concert on June 6, 2018 at Lanxess Arena in Cologne was originally scheduled to take place at Palladium, but was relocated due to high demand.)	Cologne	Germany	Lanxess Arena	Joy	10,306 / 12,269	$511,594
June 7, 2018	Zürich	Switzerland	Hallenstadion	Joy	4,098 / 7,300	$167,610
June 9, 2018 (Note: The concert on June 9, 2018 at Newmarket Racecourse in Newmarket is part of the Summer Saturday Live 2018.)	Newmarket	England	Newmarket Racecourse	—N/a	—N/a	—N/a
June 13, 2018	Glasgow	Scotland	SSE Hydro	Jax Jones; Joy	6,323 / 6,552	$330,470
June 15, 2018	Newcastle	England	Metro Radio Arena	Jax Jones; Joy	2,822 / 2,822	$157,465
June 16, 2018	Manchester	England	Manchester Arena	Jax Jones; Joy	10,019 / 11,257	$517,419
June 18, 2018	Amsterdam	Netherlands	AFAS Live	Joy	10,787 / 10,787	$466,175
June 19, 2018	Amsterdam	Netherlands	AFAS Live	Joy	10,787 / 10,787	$466,175
June 21, 2018	Barcelona	Spain	Sant Jordi Club	Joy	3,603 / 3,603	$210,417
June 22, 2018	Madrid	Spain	Palacio Vistalegre	Joy	4,671 / 5,307	$272,789
June 24, 2018 (Note: The concert on June 24, 2018 at Parque da Bela Vista in Lisbon is part of the Rock in Rio Lisboa VIII.)	Lisbon	Portugal	Parque da Bela Vista	—N/a	—N/a	—N/a
June 25, 2018 (Note: The concert on June 25, 2018 at The O_{2} Arena in London was originally scheduled to take place on June 10, but was rescheduled due to illness.)	London	England	The O_{2} Arena	Jax Jones; Joy	9,318 / 12,120	$487,775
June 27, 2018	Bologna	Italy	Unipol Arena	Joy	5,328 / 6,830	$277,628
June 29, 2018 (Note: The concert on June 29, 2018 at Arena Birmingham in Birmingham was originally scheduled to take place on June 12, but was rescheduled due to illness.)	Birmingham	England	Arena Birmingham	Joy	5,483 / 6,375	$372,264
July 19, 2018 (Note: The concert on July 22, 2018 at CenturyLink Field in Seattle is part of Amazon Post-Prime Day Concert 2018.)	Seattle	United States	CenturyLink Field	St. Vincent; Kamasi Washington	—N/a	—N/a
July 22, 2018 (Note: The concert on July 22, 2018 at Paso Robles Event Center in Paso Robles is part of The California Mid-State Fair.)	Paso Robles	United States	Paso Robles Event Center	Iggy Azalea	—N/a	—N/a
Total					364,301 / 380,953 (95%)	$23,086,371

=== Cancelled shows ===
Date	City	Country	Venue	Reason
April 28, 2018 (Note: The concert on April 28, 2018 at Coliseo General Rumiñahui in Quito was originally scheduled to take place at Agora Casa de la Cultura, but was relocated due to maintenance.)	Quito	Ecuador	Coliseo General Rumiñahui	Production issues
April 30, 2018	Panama City	Panama	Centro de Convenciones Amador	Production issues
May 1, 2018	Alajuela	Costa Rica	Coca-Cola Amphitheater	Production issues
July 26, 2018 (Note: The concert on July 26, 2018 at Atlantic City Beach in Atlantic City was part of Atlantic City BeachFest Concert Series.)	Atlantic City	United States	Atlantic City Beach	Hospitalization
September 20, 2018	Mexico City	Mexico	Arena Ciudad de México	Rehabilitation
September 22, 2018	Monterrey	Mexico	Arena Monterrey	Rehabilitation
November 14, 2018	Santiago	Chile	Movistar Arena	Rehabilitation
November 17, 2018	Buenos Aires	Argentina	DirecTV Arena	Rehabilitation
November 19, 2018	São Paulo	Brazil	Allianz Parque	Rehabilitation
November 21, 2018	Rio de Janeiro	Brazil	Jeunesse Arena	Rehabilitation
November 24, 2018	Recife	Brazil	Classic Hall	Rehabilitation
November 27, 2018	Fortaleza	Brazil	Centro de Eventos do Ceará	Rehabilitation

== Personnel ==
Adapted from Projection Lights and Staging News.

- Jesse Blevins – co-creative director, production designer
- John Taylor – co-creative director
- Andre Petrus – associate designer, programmer
- John Dacosta – lighting director
- Kevin Forster – lighting co
- Glenn Power – lighting crew chief
- Vreje Bakalian – lighting tech
- James Brooks – lighting tech
- William Rogers – lighting tech
- Philip Schulte – lighting tech
- Kevin Carswell – video director
- Mike Drew – video co
- Austen Stengle – video crew chief
- David Bergfeld – video tech
- Kyle Brinkman – video tech
- Jose Cruz – video tech
- Andrew DiCarlo – video tech
- TAIT – staging
- Brian Rhode – automation
- Pyrotex Special Effects – FX, cryo
- Amanda Pindus – FX
- Andre Morales – tour manager
- Chris Coffie – production manager
- Matt McCormick – VER project manager
- Joe Skarz – production assistant
- Liz Dlutowski – production assistant
- Geddy Lee Webb – stage manager
- Nicole Didomenico – rigger
- Bill Heinzlmeir – rigger
- Bob Madison – carpenter
- Matt Sperling – carpenter
