= Safehouse Records =

American record label founded in 2015

- Founded: 2015
- Founder: Demi Lovato; Nick Jonas; Phil McIntyre
- Defunct: July 2018; 8 years ago
- Distributors: Hollywood Records (for Lovato's releases); Island Records
- Country of origin: United States

Safehouse Records is a defunct American record label created by artists Demi Lovato, Nick Jonas and manager Phil McIntyre. Announced on May 26, 2015, its goal was to "put artists in control of their art while providing them the best tools to manage their careers." The first official album to be released from the label was Lovato's fifth studio album, Confident (2015), followed by Nick Jonas X2, the re-issue of Jonas' self-titled second album. On December 15, 2015, it was announced the record label signed Chord Overstreet, also signing him to their publishing branch, Safehouse Publishing.

The label went defunct in July 2018, following Lovato completely severing ties with McIntyre as her manager, in the midst of her Tell Me You Love Me World Tour.

In 2023, Lovato created a new label imprint entitled DLG Recordings, with distribution and music services handled by Island Records for her upcoming music releases.

== Artists ==
- Nick Jonas
- Demi Lovato
- Chord Overstreet
