= Ashe discography =

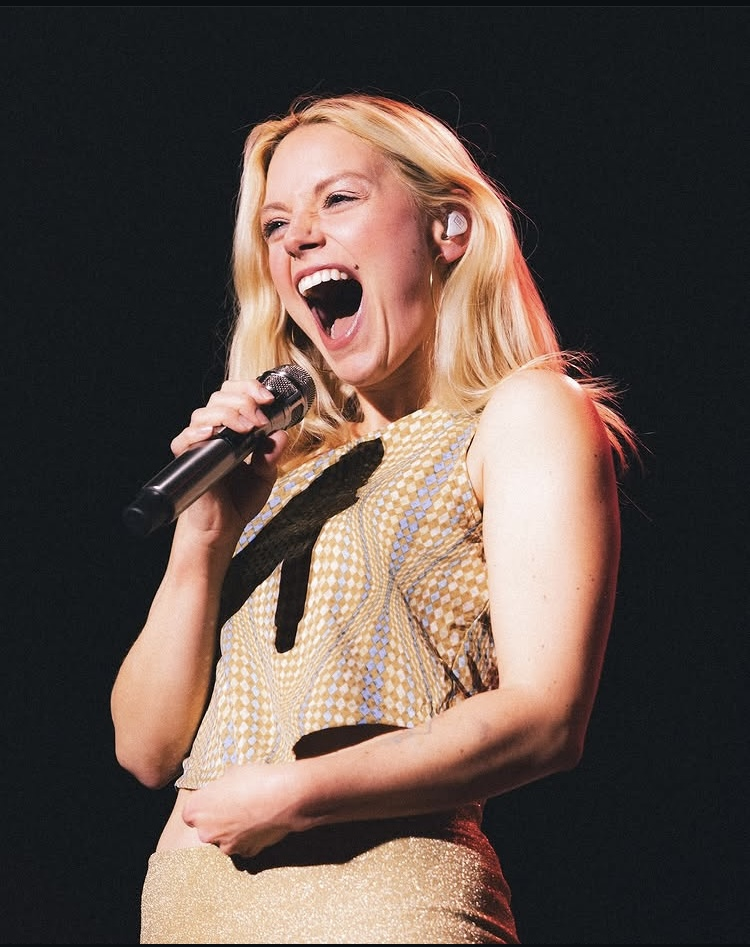
- Ashe in 2025
- Studio albums: 4
- EPs: 3
- Singles: 49
- Collaborative albums: 1

American singer-songwriter Ashe has released four solo studio albums, one collaborative studio album, three extended plays (EPs), and 45 singles, including 16 as a featured artist, and 2 as a joint artist. Ashe debuted with the release of Swedish producer Ben Phipps's single "Sleep Alone" as a featured artist in 2015. Between 2016 and 2017, she kept being featured in various musicians like Syde and Whethan. The latter's single "Can't Hide" featuring Ashe, reached the top on the US, UK, and Global Spotify Viral 50 charts. She was also featured in Canadian DJ Shaun Frank's "Let You Get Away", which achieved an award for Dance Recording of the Year at the 2017 Juno Awards and certified gold in Canada in 2019.

In 2017, Ashe signed a record deal with Mom + Pop Music. She then released her debut solo single "Used to It" that year, and debut EP The Rabbit Hole in 2018. In 2019, she released "Moral of the Story", which reached number 71 on the US Billboard Hot 100 and became the first single to enter the chart. That year, she released two EPs of the same name, composed of two chapters; the first chapter peaked at number two on the US Heatseekers Chart. Ashlyn, her debut studio album, was released through Mom + Pop on May 7, 2021. It includes her previous single "Moral of the Story" along with "Till Forever Falls Apart", a collaboration with Finneas, who executively produced her 2019 EPs. It peaked at number 194 on the US Billboard 200, while reaching number 2 on the US Heatseekers Chart.

Ashe's second studio album Rae, released on October 14, 2022, peaked at number 6 on the latter chart. On September 6, 2024, Ashe independently released her third studio album, titled Willson, and it failed to enter any of the US charts. In 2025, Ashe and her longtime collaborator Finneas created a group, named the Favors. They released their debut studio album on September 19, titled The Dream. It peaked at number 174 on the US Billboard 200, 68 in the United Kingdom, and 57 in Australia. The album also reached the top 50 in Belgium, France, and the Netherlands.

== Albums ==
=== Solo studio albums ===
| Title | Details | Peak chart positions | | | | | | | | | |
| Title | Details | US | US Heat. | US Alt. | US Indie | AUS | BEL (FL) | CAN | NLD | NOR | UK |
|---|---|---|---|---|---|---|---|---|---|---|---|
| Ashlyn | Released: May 7, 2021; Label: Mom + Pop; Formats: CD, LP, digital download, streaming | 194 | 2 | 18 | 31 | — | — | — | — | — | — |
| Rae | Released: October 14, 2022; Label: Mom + Pop; Formats: CD, LP, digital download, streaming | — | 6 | — | — | — | — | — | — | — | — |
| Willson | Released: September 6, 2024; Label: Independent; Formats: CD, LP, digital download, streaming | — | — | — | — | — | — | — | — | — | — |
| The Girl of Your Dreams | Released: October 16, 2026; Label: Atlantic; Formats: CD, LP, digital download, streaming | 20 | — | 5 | — | 13 | 114 | 54 | 50 | 38 | 85 |
"—" denotes a recording that did not chart or was not released in that territory.

=== Studio albums with the Favors ===
| Title | Details | Peak chart positions | | | | | | | |
| Title | Details | US | AUS | BEL (FL) | FRA | NLD | POR | SCO | UK |
|---|---|---|---|---|---|---|---|---|---|
| The Dream | Released: September 19, 2025; Label: Darkroom; Formats: CD, LP, digital download, streaming | 174 | 57 | 50 | 28 | 32 | 86 | 47 | 68 |

== Extended plays ==
| Title | Details | Peak chart positions | | | | |
| Title | Details | US | US Heat. | US Alt. | US Indie | CAN |
|---|---|---|---|---|---|---|
| The Rabbit Hole | Released: June 22, 2018; Label: Mom + Pop | — | — | — | — | — |
| Moral of the Story: Chapter 1 | Released: April 5, 2019; Label: Mom + Pop | 157 | 2 | 10 | 19 | 72 |
| Moral of the Story: Chapter 2 | Released: August 9, 2019; Label: Mom + Pop | — | — | — | — | — |
"—" denotes releases that did not chart, or charted on a subchart.

== Singles ==
=== As lead artist ===
| Title | Year | Peak chart positions | | | | | | | | | | Certifications | Album |
| Title | Year | US | AUS | AUT | CAN | FRA | IRE | NZ | NOR | SWI | UK | Certifications | Album |
|---|---|---|---|---|---|---|---|---|---|---|---|---|---|
| "Used to It" | 2017 | — | — | — | — | — | — | — | — | — | — | | Non-album singles |
| "Girl Who Cried Wolf" | 2017 | — | — | — | — | — | — | — | — | — | — | | Non-album singles |
| "Choirs" | 2018 | — | — | — | — | — | — | — | — | — | — | | The Rabbit Hole |
| "Moral of the Story" (solo or featuring Niall Horan) | 2019 | 71 | 44 | 29 | 42 | 71 | 17 | — (Note: "Moral of the Story" did not enter the NZ Top 40 Singles Chart, but peaked at number 5 on the NZ Hot Singles Chart.) | 35 | 30 | 31 | RIAA: Gold; BPI: Platinum; RMNZ: 2× Platinum; SNEP: Gold | Moral of the Story: Chapter 1 and Ashlyn |
| "Bachelorette" | 2019 | — | — | — | — | — | — | — | — | — | — | | Moral of the Story: Chapter 1 |
| "In Disguise" | 2019 | — | — | — | — | — | — | — | — | — | — | | Moral of the Story: Chapter 2 |
| "Cold in California" (featuring Gavin Haley) | 2019 | — | — | — | — | — | — | — | — | — | — | | Moral of the Story: Chapter 2 |
| "Monday" (with Filous) | 2019 | — | — | — | — | — | — | — | — | — | — | | Non-album single |
| "Save Myself" | 2020 | — | — | — | — | — | — | — | — | — | — | | Ashlyn |
| "The Same" | 2021 | — | — | — | — | — | — | — | — | — | — | | Non-album singles |
| "Real Love" | 2021 | — | — | — | — | — | — | — | — | — | — | | Non-album singles |
| "Till Forever Falls Apart" (with Finneas) | 2021 | — | — | — | — | — | 75 | — (Note: "Till Forever Falls Apart" did not enter the NZ Top 40 Singles Chart, but peaked at number 27 on the NZ Hot Singles Chart.) | — | — | — | RIAA: Gold; BPI: Silver; RMNZ: Platinum | Ashlyn |
| "I'm Fine" | 2021 | — | — | — | — | — | — | — | — | — | — | | Ashlyn |
| "When I'm Older" | 2021 | — | — | — | — | — | — | — | — | — | — | | Ashlyn |
| "Me Without You" | 2021 | — | — | — | — | — | — | — | — | — | — | | Ashlyn |
| "Another Man's Jeans" | 2022 | — | — | — | — | — | — | — | — | — | — | | Rae |
| "Hope You're Not Happy" | 2022 | — | — | — | — | — | — | — | — | — | — | | Rae |
| "Angry Woman" | 2022 | — | — | — | — | — | — | — | — | — | — | | Rae |
| "Shower with My Clothes On" | 2022 | — | — | — | — | — | — | — | — | — | — | | Rae |
| "Emotional" | 2022 | — | — | — | — | — | — | — | — | — | — | | Rae |
| "Love Is Letting Go" | 2022 | — | — | — | — | — | — | — | — | — | — | | Rae |
| "OMW" | 2022 | — | — | — | — | — | — | — | — | — | — | | Rae |
| "Running Out of Time" | 2024 | — | — | — | — | — | — | — | — | — | — | | Willson |
| "I Wanna Love You (But I Don't)" | 2024 | — | — | — | — | — | — | — | — | — | — | | Willson |
| "I Hope You Die First" | 2024 | — | — | — | — | — | — | — | — | — | — | | Willson |
| "Ashe" | 2024 | — | — | — | — | — | — | — | — | — | — | | Willson |
| "Pushing Daisies" (with Suki Waterhouse) | 2024 | — | — | — | — | — | — | — | — | — | — | | Non-album singles |
| "Have Yourself a Merry Little Christmas" | 2024 | — | — | — | — | — | — | — | — | — | — | | Non-album singles |
| "Stop the Wedding!" | 2026 | 12 | 5 | 9 | 8 | 105 | 1 | 5 | 2 | 9 | 3 | BPI: Silver; RMNZ: Gold | The Girl of Your Dreams |
| "Funeral" | 2026 | — | — | — | — | — | — | — (Note: "Funeral" did not enter the NZ Top 40 Singles Chart, but peaked at number 26 on the NZ Hot Singles Chart.) | — | — | — | | The Girl of Your Dreams |
"—" denotes releases that did not chart, or charted on a subchart.

=== Singles with the Favors ===
| Title | Year | Album |
|---|---|---|
| "The Little Mess You Made" | 2025 | The Dream |
| "The Hudson" | 2025 | The Dream |
| "Times Square Jesus" | 2025 | The Dream |

=== As featured artist ===
| Title | Year | Peak chart positions | | Certifications |
| Title | Year | US Dance | CAN | Certifications |
|---|---|---|---|---|
| "Sleep Alone" (Ben Phipps featuring Ashe) | 2015 | — | — | |
| "Don't Look Back" (Ben Phipps featuring Ashe) | 2016 | — | — | |
| "Alive" (Ben Phipps featuring Ashe) | 2016 | — | — | |
| "Orbit" (SŸDE featuring Ashe) | 2016 | — | — | |
| "Can't Hide" (Whethan featuring Ashe) | 2016 | — | — | |
| "Recognize" (Win and Woo featuring Ashe) | 2016 | — | — | |
| "Let You Get Away" (Shaun Frank featuring Ashe) | 2016 | — | 96 | MC: Gold |
| "The Back of Your Hands" (nimino featuring Ashe) | 2017 | — | — | |
| "World on Fire" (Louis the Child featuring Ashe) | 2017 | — | — | |
| "Rewind" (Louis Futon featuring Ashe & Armani White) | 2017 | — | — | |
| "Right to It" (Louis the Child featuring Ashe) | 2017 | 33 | — | |
| "Get Lost" (Bearson featuring Ashe) | 2018 | — | — | |
| "Love Me for the Weekend" (Party Pupils & MAX featuring Ashe) | 2018 | — | — | |
| "Right Where You Should Be" (Quinn XCII featuring Ashe and Louis Futon) | 2019 | — | — | |
| "Friends" (Big Gigantic featuring Ashe) | 2019 | — | — | |
| "Missing You" (Stephen Sanchez featuring Ashe) | 2022 | — | — | |
"—" denotes releases that did not chart, or charted on a subchart.

== Other charted songs ==
| Title | Year | Peak chart positions | | | Album |
| Title | Year | IRE | NZ Hot | UK | Album |
|---|---|---|---|---|---|
| "Lasso the Moon" | 2026 | 70 | 10 | 89 | The Girl of Your Dreams |

== Music videos ==
| Title | Year | Director | Ref. |
|---|---|---|---|
| "Can't Hide" | 2016 | Zac Stanke | |
| "Used to It" | 2017 | Stefan Weinberger | |
| "Choirs" | 2018 | Unknown | |
| "Save Myself" | 2020 | Matthew Dillon Cohen | |
| "Till Forever Falls Apart" | 2021 | Sam Bennett | |
| "Me Without You" | 2021 | Jason Lester | |
| "Love Is Not Enough" | 2021 | Jason Lester | |
| "Not Mad Anymore" | 2021 | Jason Lester | |
| "Another Man's Jeans" | 2022 | Jason Lester | |
| "Hope You're Not Happy" | 2022 | Muriel Margaret | |
| "Angry Woman" | 2022 | Jason Lester | |
| "Shower With My Clothes On" | 2022 | Jason Lester | |
| "Emotional" | 2022 | Jason Lester | |
| "OMW" | 2022 | Jason Lester | |
| "Running Out of Time" | 2024 | Ashe and Luke Rogers | |
| "I Wanna Love You (But I Don't)" | 2024 | Ashe and Luke Rogers | |
| "Pull the Plug" | 2024 | Ashe and Muriel Margaret | |
| "The Little Mess You Made" | 2025 | Scott Cudmore | |
| "The Hudson" | 2025 | Alex Lockett | |
| "Stop the Wedding!" | 2026 | Silken Weinberg | |
| "Funeral" | 2026 | Silken Weinberg | |
| "Lasso the Moon" | 2026 | Silken Weinberg | |
