= Suki Waterhouse discography =

- Waterhouse in 2015
- Studio albums: 3
- EPs: 1
- Singles: 25

English model, actress, singer and songwriter Suki Waterhouse has released three studio albums, one extended play, and 25 singles. Her first album I Can't Let Go was released in May 2022. Her second album Memoir of a Sparklemuffin was released in September 2024, and her third album Loveland was released in July 2026.

== Albums ==
=== Studio albums ===
List of studio albums, with selected details and chart positions
Title	Details	Peak chart positions						
Title	Details	UK Sales	UK Indie	AUS	BEL (FL)	SCO	US Sales	US Indie
I Can't Let Go	Released: 6 May 2022; Label: Sub Pop; Formats: CD, LP, cassette, streaming	— (Note: I Can't Let Go did not enter the UK Album Sales Chart, but peaked at number 16 on the UK Record Store Chart.)	47	—	—	—	—	—
Memoir of a Sparklemuffin	Released: 13 September 2024; Label: Sub Pop; Formats: CD, LP, cassette, streaming	39	14	—	—	46	24	45
Loveland	Released: 10 July 2026; Label: Island; Formats: CD, LP, cassette, streaming	17	—	55	146	12	23	—
"—" denotes a recording that did not chart.

== Extended plays ==
Title	Details
Milk Teeth	Released: 4 November 2022; Label: Sub Pop; Formats: CD, LP, streaming

== Singles ==
Title	Year	Peak chart positions						Certifications	Album/EP
Title	Year	UK	UK Indie	IRE	NZ Hot	US AAA	US Rock	Certifications	Album/EP
"Brutally"	2016	—	—	—	—	—	—		Milk Teeth
"Good Looking"	2017	92	18	63	16	—	14	BPI: Gold; MC: 2× Platinum; RMNZ: Platinium; RIAA: 2× Platinum	Milk Teeth
"Valentine"	2018	—	—	—	—	—	—		Milk Teeth
"Coolest Place in the World"	2019	—	—	—	—	—	—		Milk Teeth
"Johanna"	2019	—	—	—	—	—	—		Milk Teeth
"My Mind"	2021	—	—	—	—	—	—		I Can't Let Go
"Moves"	2021	—	—	—	—	—	—	MC: Gold	I Can't Let Go
"Melrose Meltdown"	2022	—	—	—	—	—	—		I Can't Let Go
"Devil I Know"	2022	—	—	—	—	—	—		I Can't Let Go
"Wild Side"	2022	—	—	—	—	—	—		I Can't Let Go
"Nostalgia"	2022	—	—	—	—	—	—		Non-album single
"Neon Signs"	2022	—	—	—	—	—	—		Milk Teeth
"To Love"	2023	—	—	—	—	—	—		Memoir of a Sparklemuffin
"OMG"	2024	—	—	—	—	—	—		Memoir of a Sparklemuffin
"My Fun"	2024	—	—	—	—	—	—		Memoir of a Sparklemuffin
"Faded"	2024	—	—	—	—	—	—		Memoir of a Sparklemuffin
"Supersad"	2024	—	—	—	—	11	— (Note: "Supersad" did not enter the Hot Rock & Alternative Songs chart, but peaked at number 43 on the Rock & Alternative Airplay chart.)		Memoir of a Sparklemuffin
"Blackout Drunk"	2024	—	—	—	—	—	—		Memoir of a Sparklemuffin
"Pushing Daisies" (with Ashe)	2024	—	—	—	—	—	—		Non-album single
"Dream Woman"	2025	—	—	—	—	—	—		Memoir of a Sparklemuffin (Deluxe)
"On This Love"	2025	—	—	—	—	—	—		Memoir of a Sparklemuffin (Deluxe)
"Back in Love"	2026	— (Note: "Back in Love" did not enter the UK Singles Chart, but peaked at number 13 on the UK Physical Singles chart.)	—	—	—	12	—		Loveland
"Tiny Raisin"	2026	—	—	—	—	—	—		Loveland
"When I Get Drunk (I Want You Boy)"	2026	—	—	—	—	—	—		Loveland
"Notting Hill"	2026	—	—	—	36	—	—		Loveland
"—" denotes a recording that did not chart or was not released in that territory.
