= The Girl of Your Dreams (album) =

Studio album by Ashe
- Released: October 16, 2026
- Recorded: November 2025 – January 2026
- Length: 39:27
- Label: Atlantic
- Producer: Noah Conrad

Ashe chronology
The Dream (2025)	The Girl of Your Dreams (2026)

Singles from The Girl of Your Dreams
- 1. "Stop the Wedding!" Released: August 7, 2026; 2. "Funeral" Released: September 3, 2026

The Girl of Your Dreams is the fourth studio album by American singer and songwriter Ashe. It was released on October 16, 2026, through Atlantic Records. Two singles, "Stop the Wedding!" and "Funeral", preceded the album. Following Ashe and Finneas's collaborative project The Dream (2025), she reunited with a producer Noah Conrad in The Girl of Your Dreams.

== Background ==
Ashe began writing her fourth studio album, The Girl of Your Dreams, after working with Finneas on their collaborative project The Favors, whose debut studio album The Dream was released in September 2025. Around this period, she married fellow musician John Clark Canada, which led her to reflect on her previous marriage and personal growth. She described The Girl of Your Dreams as being written from a "healed, actualized, fulfilled place", rather than from a search for love, self-discovery, or purpose. Ashe characterized the album as a process of shedding other people's expectations and projections of her identity, particularly the pressures placed on women, and said it allowed her to recognize that she was "not as fragile as [she] maybe thought".

In announcing the project, Ashe said the songs were written from a "bird's eye view" on stories she had previously been closely involved in. The album incorporates themes of 1950s Hollywood, including silk dresses and hazy, romantic lighting.

== Promotion ==
Ashe announced that The Girl of Your Dreams would be released on October 16, 2026, through Atlantic Records. With producer Noah Conrad, who co-wrote her 2019 single "Moral of the Story" and co-produced her debut studio album, Ashlyn (2021), The Girl of Your Dreams was preceded by the lead single "Stop the Wedding!" on August 7 and the second single "Funeral" on September 3. The album was released on October 16 by Atlantic Records, marking her first album to be released through that label. On October 22, to promote the album, Ashe announced The Girl of Your Dreams Tour, between February and April 2027, beginning in North America and Europe.

== Critical reception ==
The album received positive reviews from critics.

Professional ratings
Review scores
Source	Rating
AllMusic	4/5 stars
Pitchfork	6.8/10

== Track listing ==
The Girl of Your Dreams track listing
No.	Title	Writer(s)	Producer(s)	Length
1.	"Stop the Wedding!"	Ashlyn Willson; Annika Bennett; Noah Conrad	Conrad	3:20
2.	"Lasso the Moon"	Willson; Casey Smith; Conrad	Conrad	3:43
3.	"Stardust"	Willson; Bennett; Conrad	Conrad	3:51
4.	"Love Bomb"	Willson; Max McElligott; Conrad	Conrad	3:25
5.	"Blue Hour"	Willson; Bennett; Conrad	Conrad	3:47
6.	"Swan Lake"	Willson; Conrad; Jules Apollinaire; Natalie Findlay	Conrad; Apollinaire	3:57
7.	"Sunburn"	Willson; Carrie Karpinen; Conrad	Conrad	3:31
8.	"Always September"	Willson; McElligott; Conrad	Conrad	3:41
9.	"The Girl of Your Dreams"	Willson; Smith; Conrad	Conrad	3:08
10.	"Sweet Caroline"	Willson; Smith; Conrad	Conrad	3:42
11.	"Funeral"	Willson; Bennett; Conrad	Conrad	3:32
Total length:				39:27

== Personnel ==
Credits were adapted from Tidal.

=== Musicians ===
- Ashe – vocals (all tracks), background vocals (1–3, 5–6, 8, 10–11), percussion (6)
- Noah Conrad – acoustic guitar (1–7, 10–11), background vocals (1, 6, 8, 10–11), baritone guitar (5, 10), bass (3, 5, 8, 10–11), drums (5–6, 10–11), electric guitar (1–2, 4–8), flugelhorn (2, 6, 11), glockenspiel (3), keyboards (2, 4) Mellotron (1–2, 5–6, 8–9, 11), mini Moog (1, 6, 8–9), organ (1, 3, 5, 8–11), percussion (1–2, 4–6, 8, 10–11), piano (all tracks), programming (1–2, 10), trumpet (2, 6–7, 11), upright bass (7), Wurlitzer (2, 4, 11), zither (3)
- Annika Bennett – background vocals (1, 3, 5)
- Medium Build – background vocals (1)
- Pera Krstajic – bass (1–2, 4, 8)
- Charles Tyler – cello (1, 6–8)
- Vanessa Freebairn-Smith – cello (1, 6–8)
- Michael Valerio – double bass (1, 6–8)
- Jonah Summerfield – drums (1, 8)
- Noah Gladstone – orchestral contractor (1, 6–8)
- Andrew Duckles – viola (1, 6–8)
- Miguel Atwood-Ferguson – viola (1, 6–8)
- Alyssa Park – violin (1, 6–8)
- Andrew Bulbrook – violin (1, 6–8)
- Luanne Homzy – violin (1, 6–8)
- Mark Robertson – violin (1, 6–8)
- Paul Cartwright – violin (1, 6–8), string orchestra (2), leader violin (6), strings arranger (6–8)
- Cleo Tighe – background vocals (2)
- Adrian Cota – drums (2), percussion (2)
- Ryan Linvell – flute (2), saxophone (2)
- Aksel Koe – drums (3)
- Harrisom Whitford – electric guitar (3–4), guitar (10), slide guitar (3)
- Max Wolfgang – acoustic guitar (4), guitar (4), percussion (4), piano (8)
- Harry Terrell – drums (4)
- Jules Apollinaire – acoustic guitar (6), background vocals (6), baritone guitar (6), bass (6), electric guitar (6), mellotron (6), organ (6), percussion (6)
- Natalie Findlay – background vocals (6), percussion (6)
- Derek Stein – cello (9)
- Emma Ogier – background vocals (10)

=== Technical ===
- Ruairí O'Flaherty – mastering mastering (all tracks)
- Spike Stent – mixing (1–2, 6)
- Lars Stalfors – mixing (3–4)
- Pedro Calloni – mixing (10–11)
- Chandler Harrod – engineering (1, 6–8)
- Noah Conrad – engineering (all tracks), mixing (5, 7–9)
- Aksel Koe – engineering (3)
- Walker Steele – assistant engineering (1–2, 5–6)

== Charts ==
Chart performance
Chart (2026)	Peak position
Australian Albums (ARIA)	13
Belgian Albums (Ultratop Flanders)	114
Belgian Albums (Ultratop Wallonia)	200
Canadian Albums (Billboard)	54
Dutch Albums (Album Top 100)	50
French Albums (SNEP)	200
Lithuanian Albums (AGATA)	51
Norwegian Albums (IFPI Norge)	38
Polish Albums (ZPAV)	95
Portuguese Streaming Albums (AFP)	195
Scottish Albums (Official Charts)	35
UK Albums (Official Charts)	85
US Billboard 200	20
US Top Rock & Alternative Albums (Billboard)	6

== Release history ==
Release dates and formats
Region	Date	Format(s)	Label	Ref.
Various	October 16, 2026	Cassette; CD; digital download; LP; streaming	Atlantic	
