= The Dream (The Favors album) =

Studio album by the Favors
- Released: September 19, 2025
- Length: 38:09
- Label: Darkroom
- Producer: Finneas

Ashe chronology
Willson (2024)	The Dream (2025)	The Girl of Your Dreams (2026)

Finneas chronology
For Cryin' Out Loud! (2024)	The Dream (2025)

Singles from The Dream
- 1. "The Little Mess You Made" Released: June 6, 2025; 2. "The Hudson" Released: July 11, 2025; 3. "Times Square Jesus" Released: August 13, 2025

The Dream is the debut studio album by the American supergroup the Favors, composed of American singer-songwriters Ashe and Finneas. It was released through Darkroom Records on September 19, 2025.

== Background ==
In 2021, Ashe and Finneas collaborated on "Till Forever Falls Apart", which was featured on her first album Ashlyn. Finneas also cowrote and produced the hit song "Moral of the Story" from that album.

In February 2025, an anonymous Instagram account was created under the name @weshouldmakeaband. The account began posting mysterious, vintage camcorder-style snippets of Finneas and Ashe making music. They both further went on with posting hints on their respective accounts. They most notably posted the Austin City Limits festival lineup with a hidden artist slot, which was assumed to be for the band. Speculation continued to rise as the two began to confirm a collaboration in their live performances. Ashe made an appearance at Finneas's For Cryin' Out Loud! Tour stop in Los Angeles in March, where they performed the unreleased song "Lake George". Prior to the release of "The Little Mess You Made", Ashe performed a part of the song while she was opening for Gracie Abrams on The Secret of Us Tour in Australia, while Finneas simultaneously performed a part of the song in Germany during his tour.

The album was announced on June 3, 2025.

== Promotion ==
The Favors released their debut single on June 6, 2025, titled "The Little Mess You Made". "The Hudson" was released on July 11, 2025, as the second single. The third single titled "Times Square Jesus" was released on August 13, 2025. The group announced their An Evening With the Favors Tour in July 2025. The tour will stop in Los Angeles, Morrison, and New York City, while also performing twice at the Austin City Limits Music Festival.

=== Tour ===
On July 15, 2025, The Favors announced a three date North American tour visiting Los Angeles, Morrison, and New York City.

== Critical reception ==
Professional ratings
Review scores
Source	Rating
AllMusic	4/5 stars
The AU Review	5/5 stars
Dork	4/5

Dork described The Dream as "theatrical, tender and quietly devastating", highlighting its "rich harmonies, playful detours, and songwriting that balances depth with just the right amount of daft". The review further characterized the record as "full of humour, heartbreak and unexpected joy", while noting that its "little messy" and "very human" qualities made it "all the better for it". Melodic Magazine wrote that the album "isn't just a debut—it feels like the kind of record artists spend years building toward", praising it as "deeply emotional, beautifully crafted, and full of surprises". They added that it showcases "each member's strengths while never losing its sense of cohesion or heart".

== Track listing ==
All tracks are written by Finneas O'Connell and Ashlyn Willson; "The Dream", "Times Square Jesus", "David's Brother", "Someday I'll Be Back in Hollywood", and "Home Sweet Home" written with Matthew Fildey and David Marinelli.

The Dream track listing
No.	Title	Length
1.	"Restless Little Heart"	0:55
2.	"The Dream"	3:19
3.	"Moonshine"	3:06
4.	"The Little Mess You Made"	3:21
5.	"The Hudson"	3:36
6.	"Ordinary People"	1:29
7.	"Necessary Evils"	3:13
8.	"Times Square Jesus"	4:15
9.	"David's Brother"	3:37
10.	"Lake George"	4:19
11.	"Someday I'll Be Back in Hollywood" (with Marinelli)	3:31
12.	"Home Sweet Home"	3:28
Total length:		38:09

== Personnel ==
Credits were adapted from Tidal.

=== The Favors ===
- Ashe – vocals (all tracks), keyboards (tracks 1–3, 5–8, 10–12)
- Finneas – vocals, synthesizer, upright piano, production, engineering (all tracks); percussion (1–5, 8–12), acoustic guitar (1–4, 6–12), bass (1–3, 5–7, 10, 12), keyboards (3, 9), guitar (11)

=== Additional contributors ===
- Aron Forbes – mixing, engineering
- Ruairi O'Flaherty – mastering
- Connor Gilmore – engineering
- David Marinelli – drums (all tracks), percussion (7, 8, 12), bass (8), synthesizer (11, 12); guitar, vocals (11)
- Matthew Fildey – electric guitar (all tracks), bass (3, 8, 9, 11)
- Paul Cartwright – string arrangement, violin (1–4, 6–8, 10, 12)
- Noah Gladstone – orchestra (1, 2, 6–8, 10, 12)
- Charles Tyler – cello (1, 2, 6–8, 10, 12)
- Vanessa Freebairn-Smith – cello (1, 2, 6–8, 10, 12)
- Andrew Duckles – viola (1, 2, 6–8, 10, 12)
- Stefan Smith – viola (1, 2, 6–8, 10, 12)
- Ben Jacobson – violin (1, 2, 6–8, 10, 12)
- Gallia Kastner – violin (1, 2, 6–8, 10, 12)
- Luanne Homzy – violin (1, 2, 6–8, 10, 12)

== Charts ==
Chart performance for The Dream
Chart (2025)	Peak position
Australian Albums (ARIA)	57
Belgian Albums (Ultratop Flanders)	50
Dutch Albums (Album Top 100)	32
French Rock & Metal Albums (SNEP)	28
Portuguese Albums (AFP)	86
Scottish Albums (Official Charts)	47
UK Albums Sales (OCC)	68
UK Independent Albums (Official Charts)	27
US Billboard 200	174
US Top Rock & Alternative Albums (Billboard)	42
