= Willson (album) =

Studio album by Ashe
- Released: September 6, 2024
- Length: 43:29
- Label: Ashe
- Producers: Collin Pastore; Jake Finch

Ashe chronology
Rae (2022)	Willson (2024)	The Dream (2025)

Singles from Willson
- 1. "Running Out of Time" Released: June 28, 2024; 2. "I Wanna Love You (But I Don't)" Released: August 2, 2024; 3. "I Hope You Die First" Released: August 2, 2024; 4. "Ashe" Released: September 4, 2024

Willson is the third studio album by American singer-songwriter Ashe. It was released on September 6, 2024, as an independent artist. After the cancellation of her 2023 tour, Fun While It Lasted Tour, she decided to take a break for a while. In 2024, she announced that her new studio album would be released, sharing four singles such as "Running Out of Time", "I Wanna Love You", "I Hope You Die First" and "Ashe". Ashe also co-wrote the songs with Collin Pastore and Jake Finch.

Upon its release, it received positive reviews from music critics. Ashe announced the Trilogy Tour in May 2025, to support Willson as well as her previous albums, Ashlyn (2021) and Rae (2022).

== Background ==
Following the rapid growth of her career, Ashe experienced severe burnout after extensive touring in 2022 and felt increasingly disconnected from the artist she had become. She returned to Nashville in October 2022 for a "reset", describing the city as a "safe haven", and spent time away from music before gradually returning to songwriting. Her return was prompted in part by a 2023 writing session with Suki Waterhouse, which renewed her confidence in music and led to the creation of "Please Don't Fall in Love With Me", the first song written for Willson.

In 2023, Ashe was scheduled to embark on her Fun While It Lasted Tour. However, she announced that it was canceled on February 1, citing that she no longer felt "mentally healthy or resilient enough to go back on tour yet" and forced herself to take a break for her mental health. On June 21, 2024, Ashe gave her first live performance in over a year, where she performed her 2015 single "Moral of the Story" with Niall Horan during his Saratoga Springs stop on his tour.

== Promotion ==
On June 27, 2024, Ashe announced that her third studio album, Willson, would be released on September 6, her first album being an independent artist. The lead single, "Running Out of Time", was released on June 28. She released her second and third single, "I Wanna Love You (But I Don't)" and "I Hope You Die First" on August 2. She released "Ashe", the fourth and final single, on September 4.

=== Tour ===
Ashe embarked on the Trilogy Tour in May 2025, in support of her first three studio albums.

== Critical reception ==
Ones to Watch's DJ Connor praised Willson as a deeply personal and celebratory album shaped by Ashe's experiences of grief, burnout, career upheaval, and new love. They highlighted its stylistic range, from the piano-led "Please Don't Fall in Love With Me" and upbeat "Running Out of Time" to the darker "Dear Stranger" and "Helter Skelter". Connor ultimately described the album as a "course correction" that transforms Ashe's difficult experiences into a sense of renewed belonging.

== Track listing ==
All tracks were produced by Collin Pastore and Jake Finch.

Willson track listing
No.	Title	Writer(s)	Length
1.	"Please Don't Fall in Love with Me"	Ashlyn Willson; Collin Pastore; Jake Finch	2:45
2.	"Running Out of Time"	Willson; Pastore; Finch; Julian Bunetta; Steph Jones	3:35
3.	"Pull the Plug"	Willson; Pastore; Finch	3:19
4.	"Cherry Trees"	Willson; Pastore; Finch	3:03
5.	"I Wanna Love You (But I Don't)"	Willson; Pastore; Finch	4:18
6.	"Helter Skelter"	Willson; Pastore; Finch	3:48
7.	"Dear Stranger"	Willson; Pastore; Finch	3:31
8.	"Hornet's Nest"	Willson; Pastore; Finch	4:10
9.	"Castle"	Willson; Pastore; Finch	3:20
10.	"Don't Do Me Any Favors" (physical editions only)	Willson; Pastore; Finch	3:42
11.	"I Hope You Die First"	Willson; Pastore; Finch	3:26
12.	"Devil Herself"	Willson; Pastore; Finch	3:53
13.	"Ashe"	Willson; Pastore; Finch	4:21
Total length:			48:11

=== Notes ===
- "Please Don't Fall in Love with Me" and "I Hope You Die First" are stylized in sentence case.

== Personnel ==
=== Musicians ===
- Ashlyn Willson – vocals (all tracks)

=== Technical ===
- Preston Cochran – mastering (all tracks)
