= Ttrruuces (album) =

Studio album by Ttrruuces
- Released: 26 June 2020
- Recorded: 2019–2020
- Studio: Home studio in France, Brittany; London, England
- Length: 37:57
- Label: AllPoints
- Producer: Ttrruuces; Alan Moulder

Singles from Ttrruuces
- 1. "Sad Girl" Released: 18 October 2019; 2. "Ttrruuces/Lost Boy" Released: 29 January 2020; 3. "Sensations of Cool" Released: 12 March 2020; 4. "Evil Elephant" Released: 23 April 2020; 5. "I'm Alive" Released: 28 May 2020

Professional ratings
Review scores
| Source | Rating |
|---|---|
| DIY | 3.5/5 stars |
| Louder Than War | 5/5 stars |

Ttrruuces is the debut studio album by English psychedelic rock band Ttrruuces released on 20 June 2020 through AllPoints Records.

The record is a rock opera which narrates the story of two fictional characters, Sadie and Syd, in their quest to acquire a new drug named Ttrruuces in order to go through a mind-altering journey and find their way in an often bleak world. Each song is accompanied by a music video that comes together as a coming-of-age film. In part, the visuals draw inspiration from 1920s jazz and cartoon music as well as commercials from the 60s and Tim Burton's movies.

The track "I'm Alive" is featured on the soundtrack of FIFA 20.

== Music and lyrics ==
Ttrruuces opens with the track "Sad Girl", with lyrics about a 17-year-old girl named Sadie who is depressed and lonely, living in a complicated family situation. As the song progresses, the lyrics tell her to "have a little patience" and wait for better things to happen. "Sad Girl" is a progressive rock song that contains ballad and psychedelic rock elements.

The next track, "Sensations of Cool", explains how disenchanted Sadie feels with the world around her, criticising the ways of modern life, and how she is in search of something real she can hold on to. On the video for "Sensations of Cool", filmmaker Sam Kinsella said:

"This is by far the most kooky video I've ever directed. We went Lynch meets Dr. Seuss, and I still get genuinely scared every time I watch it back. Both the song and the video perfectly capture my feelings towards the current world, which I’ve been struggling to express for some time."

== Track listing ==
All lyrics are written by Ttrruuces.

| No. | Title | Length |
|---|---|---|
| 1. | "Sad Girl" | 4:55 |
| 2. | "Sensations of Cool" | 3:43 |
| 3. | "The Disco" | 3:41 |
| 4. | "Lost Boy" | 2:51 |
| 5. | "Bad Kids" | 3:27 |
| 6. | "TTRRUUCES" | 2:32 |
| 7. | "Evil Elephant" | 3:40 |
| 8. | "Stranger Now Forever" | 4:04 |
| 9. | "I'm Alive" | 3:49 |
| 10. | "Something Inside" | 4:36 |
| 11. | "Sleepy Head" | 5:15 |
| Total length: | | 43:09 |
