= Loveland (Suki Waterhouse album) =

Studio album by Suki Waterhouse
- Released: 10 July 2026
- Length: 43:12
- Label: Island
- Producers: Amy Allen; Jules Apollinaire; Noise Dept.; Michael Derenzo; Aaron Dessner; Steph Jones; Carrie K; Joel Little; Meija; Cole M.G.N.; Gabe Simon; Emily Warren; Dan Wilson; Sammy Witte

Suki Waterhouse chronology
Memoir of a Sparklemuffin (2024)	Loveland (2026)

Singles from Loveland
- 1. "Back in Love" Released: 27 March 2026; 2. "Tiny Raisin" Released: 24 April 2026; 3. "When I Get Drunk (I Want You Boy)" Released: 12 June 2026; 4. "Notting Hill" Released: 9 July 2026

Loveland is the third studio album by the English singer Suki Waterhouse. It was released on 10 July 2026 by Island Records, as her major-label debut album.

== Background ==
In August 2025, Waterhouse signed to Island Records. She previously released her first two albums independently through Sub Pop.

Waterhouse released the lead single "Back in Love" on 27 March 2026. She announced the album on 21 April 2026 for a 10 July release date. The same day, she announced "Tiny Raisin" would be the second single, which was to be released on 24 April 2026. The album's third single, "When I Get Drunk (I Want You Boy)", was released on 12 June 2026. "Notting Hill" was released on 9 July 2026.

== Critical reception ==
Professional ratings
Aggregate scores
Source	Rating
Metacritic	75/100
Review scores
Source	Rating
AllMusic	4/5 stars
DIY	4/5 stars
NME	4/5 stars
The Line of Best Fit	6/10 stars

At Metacritic, which assigns a rating out of 100 to reviews from professional publications, the album received a weighted average score of 75, based on six reviews, indicating "generally favorable reviews". Marcy Donelson of AllMusic gave a positive review and described Loveland as an album to dance around to. Brad Sked of DIY says Loveland is an album scattered with gems of a 14-track odyssey in a testament to Waterhouse's pursuit of further sonic exploration. Rhian Daly of NME gave the album a score of 4 out of 5 stars, saying the album has a natural split between the songs on the album, with some fitting into a cinematic, head-spinning feeling of falling in love, and others paying tribute to more mundane things.

Cassidy Sollazzo of Paste described the album as "anemic, radio-friendly pop that's a little soulless", with Waterhouse having a lack of artistic perspective.

== Track listing ==
Loveland – standard edition
No.	Title	Writer(s)	Producer(s)	Length
1.	"Back in Love"	Suki Waterhouse; Jules Apollinaire; Findlay	Apollinaire	3:14
2.	"Any Man"	Waterhouse; Joel Little; Apollinaire; Amy Allen; Findlay	Little; Gabe Simon	2:46
3.	"Happy with It"	Waterhouse; Sammy Witte; Simon Wilcox	Simon; Witte	3:18
4.	"Notting Hill"	Waterhouse; Apollinaire; Findlay	Apollinaire	3:10
5.	"Teardrops"	Waterhouse; Apollinaire; Findlay	Apollinaire	3:44
6.	"When I Get Drunk (I Want You Boy)"	Waterhouse; Michael Derenzo; Paraj Jain	Noise Dept.; Derenzo	3:26
7.	"Jukebox"	Waterhouse; Apollinaire; Cole M.G.N.; Findlay	Apollinaire; M.G.N.	3:11
8.	"Seasons"	Waterhouse; Apollinaire; Aaron Dessner; Findlay	Apollinaire; Dessner	3:00
9.	"Tiny Raisin"	Waterhouse; Simon; Carrie K; Steph Jones	Simon; Jones; K^{[a]}	2:59
10.	"Almost"	Waterhouse; Dessner; Emily Warren	Dessner; Warren	3:05
11.	"Puppy Dog Eyes"	Waterhouse; Dan Wilson; Jamie Sierota; James Norton	Wilson; Meija	2:28
12.	"Morals"	Waterhouse; Andrew Wells; Allen; Norton	Wells; Allen	2:21
13.	"Loveland"	Waterhouse; Wilson; Sierota; Norton; EJ Saftner	Wilson; Meija	2:58
14.	"Weirdo"	Waterhouse; Little; Norton; Donna Missal	Little	3:31
Total length:				43:12

Bonus track version
No.	Title	Writer(s)	Producer(s)	Length
15.	"18"	Waterhouse; John Hill; Mikaela Straus; Simon Wilcox	King Princess; Hill^{[a]}	3:02
Total length:				46:14

- ^{^[a]} Additional producer

== Personnel ==
Credits adapted from Tidal.

=== Musicians ===
- Suki Waterhouse – vocals (all tracks)
- Natalie Findlay – background vocals (1, 5, 7), keyboard (1, 5, 7), percussion (1)
- Jules Apollinaire – bass (1, 4–5, 7–8), drum kit (1, 7), drum programming (8), electric guitar (8), guitar (1, 4–5, 7), keyboard (1, 4, 7), percussion (1, 4–5, 7), programming (1, 4–5, 7), synthesizer (5, 8)
- Sam Ewens – horn arranger (1), trombone (1), trumpet (1)
- Gareth Lumbers – tenor saxophone (1)
- Gabe Simon – acoustic guitar (2, 9), background vocals (2, 9), bass (2–3, 9), congas (9), electric guitar (2–3, 9), Hammond B3 (3), Mellotron (2–3, 9), percussion (9), synthesizer (2–3, 9)
- Joel Little – acoustic guitar (2), bass (14), drum kit (14), guitar (14), keyboard (14), Mellotron (2), percussion (14), programming (2–3, 14), string arranger (14)
- Carrie K – drum kit (2, 9), percussion (2, 9)
- Sammy Witte – bass (3), drum kit (3), guitar (3), keyboard (3), programming (3)
- Carlos Arévalo – guitar (3)
- Declan McKenna – drum kit (5)
- Paraj Jain – bass (6), guitar (6), keyboard (6), programming (6)
- Michael Derenzo – keyboard (6), programming (6)
- Cole M.G.N. – bass (7), drum kit (7), guitar (7), keyboard (7), percussion (7)
- Aaron Dessner – acoustic guitar (8, 10), bass (8, 10), drum kit (10), drum programming (8, 10), electric guitar (8, 10), Mellotron (8, 10), percussion (10), piano (8, 10), synthesizer (8, 10)
- James McAlister – drum programming (8, 10), synthesizer (8, 10), Wurlitzer electronic piano (8)
- Steph Jones – background vocals (9)
- Jamie Sierota – acoustic guitar (11, 13), bass guitar (11, 13), drum programming (11), electric guitar (11), keyboard (13), programming (11), synth bass (13)
- Carson Gant – drum kit (11, 13)
- Dan Wilson – drum programming (11), electric guitar (11, 13), programming (11), slide guitar (13)
- Sara Mulford – drum programming (11), percussion (11), programming (11), tambourine (13)
- Andrew Wells – bass (12), guitar (12), keyboard (12)
- Mick Fleetwood – drum kit (12)
- Cassidy Turbin – percussion (12)
- Boy Matthews – background vocals (14)
- King Princess – background vocals (15), bass (15), guitar (15), keyboard (15), programming (15)
- Carter Nyhan – drum kit (15), percussion (15)
- John Hill – drum programming (15)
- Abe Burns – Mellotron (15)

=== Technical ===
- Emily Lazar – mastering (1)
- Dale Becker – mastering (2–15)
- Nathan Phillips – mixing (1–11, 13–15)
- Jules Apollinaire – engineering (1, 4–5, 7)
- Joel Little – engineering (2, 14)
- Gabe Simon – engineering (3)
- Sammy Witte – engineering (3)
- Michael Derenzo – engineering (6)
- Paraj Jain – engineering (6)
- Dan Wilson – engineering (11)
- Jamie Sierota – engineering (11)
- Sara Mulford – engineering (11)
- Adam Burt – additional mastering (2–15)
- Katie Harvey – additional mastering (2–15)
- Noah McCorkle – additional mastering (2–15)
- Gillian Pelkonen – additional engineering (10)

== Charts ==
Chart performance for Loveland
Chart (2026)	Peak position
Australian Albums (ARIA)	55
Belgian Albums (Ultratop Flanders)	146
Belgian Albums (Ultratop Wallonia)	167
Scottish Albums (Official Charts)	12
UK Albums Sales (Official Charts)	17
US Top Album Sales (Billboard)	23
