= Syde (duo) =

Australian indie electronic duo

SŸDE
- Origin: Melbourne, Victoria, Australia
- Genres: Indie electronic
- Years active: 2016–present
- Label: Dew Process
- Members: Will Hyde; Mitch Stephens

Syde (stylised as SŸDE ) are an Australian indie electronic duo consisting of Will Hyde and Mitch Stephens. The name SŸDE "is combination of their last names" with the umlaut used to make them "sound European".

SŸDE released their debut single "Orbit" in 2016. It features Ashe In 2017, SŸDE were Triple J Unearthed High Finalist. and signed with Dew Process.

In November 2017, they released the single "About the Clouds" featuring Olivia Reid, described by Andy Gorel of C-Heads as "A comfortable blend of indie folk and electronic pop." "About the Clouds" was used in a Visa advertising campaign in early 2018.

In July 2018 SŸDE released "Follow" Me featuring Evan Klar.

In August 2019, SŸDE released "Her Touch", with the duo explaining, "The song is about passion, feeling passion and then the sensation of not caring once you’ve lost it. We wanted to touch on the craziness of feeling love so intensely but then the flip side when you're out of love. It’s like you completely forget the feelings you once had when you were in that relationship."

== Members ==
- Will Hyde – keyboard and producer
- Mitch Stephens – guitar and producer

== Discography ==
=== Singles ===
List of singles, with year released and certifications
Title	Year	Certifications
"Orbit" (featuring Ashe)	2016	
"Above the Clouds" (featuring Olivia Reid)	2017	ARIA: Gold
"Follow Me" (featuring Evan Klar)	2018	
"Her Touch"	2019	

== Awards and nominations ==
=== J Awards ===
The J Awards are an annual series of Australian music awards that were established by the Australian Broadcasting Corporation's youth-focused radio station Triple J. They commenced in 2005.

Year	Nominee / work	Award	Result	Ref.
J Awards of 2017	themselves	Unearthed High	Nominated	
