= Forgotten Pleasures =

Studio album by Findlay
- Released: March 3, 2017
- Genre: Alternative Rock, Indie
- Length: 47:51
- Label: BMG

Findlay chronology
Forgotten Pleasures (2017)	The Last of the 20th Century Girls (2022)

Forgotten Pleasures is the debut studio album release by Findlay. It was released on March 3, 2017 via digital, cd, limited vinyl under BMG. Findlay is accompanied by Jules Apollinaire (also a co-producer) on keyboards, bass and guitar. Ben Simon on guitar, Christina Lamas on drums, as well as producers Jake Gosling (The Libertines, Ed Sheeran), Samy Osta (Woman, Fire Chatterton, Rover!) and Flood (Nick Cave, Depeche Mode, Smashing Pumpkins).

== Track listing ==
No.	Title	Writer(s)	Producer(s)	Length
1.	"Electric Bones"	Natalie Findlay		3:12
2.	"Waste My Time"	Natalie Findlay	co. Jules Apollinaire	3:41
3.	"Stuck In Your Shadow"	Natalie Findlay	co. Jules Apollinaire	2:36
4.	"Greasy Love"	Natalie Findlay	Flood, Dougal Drummond, Kristian Gilro	3:42
5.	"Monomania (Nobody Loves You Like I Love You)"	Natalie Findlay	co. Jules Apollinaire	3:16
6.	"Junk Food"	Natalie Findlay	co. Jules Apollinaire	2:52
7.	"Off & On"	Natalie Findlay		2:45
8.	"Wild & Unwise"	Natalie Findlay	co. Jules Apollinaire	4:10
9.	"Forgotten Pleasures"	Natalie Findlay	co. Jules Apollinaire	4:01
10.	"Stoned And Alone"	Natalie Findlay		4:11
11.	"We Are Never The Last"	Natalie Findlay		3:35
12.	"St. Elmos Fire"	Natalie Findlay, Carl Barat	Jake Gosling	4:39
13.	"Sunday Morning In The Afternoon"	Natalie Findlay		5:11
Total length:				47.51
