= Stop the Wedding! =

Single by Ashe

from the album The Girl of Your Dreams
- Released: August 7, 2026
- Length: 3:19
- Label: Atlantic
- Songwriters: Ashlyn Wilson; Noah Conrad; Annika Bennett
- Producer: Conrad

Ashe singles chronology
"Have Yourself a Merry Little Christmas" (2024)	"Stop the Wedding!" (2026)	"Funeral" (2026)

Music video
- "Stop the Wedding!" on YouTube

"Stop the Wedding!" is a song by American singer-songwriter Ashe, and is the lead single of her fourth album The Girl of Your Dreams. It was released on August 7, 2026 by Atlantic Records. It was written by Ashlyn Willson, Noah Conrad and Annika Bennett and was produced by Conrad.

== Background ==
Shortly after marrying her second husband in 2025, Ashe reflected on her first marriage and how her ex-husband's behavior during their wedding had foreshadowed their divorce. This realization inspired her to write the song, in which she pleads to her younger self to leave her prior marriage before the problems could begin. Ashe described "Stop the Wedding!" as the "older, wiser sister" of her 2019 breakout song "Moral of the Story".

== Music video ==
An official music video was released on the same day as the single. It was directed by Silken Weinberg and inspired by the work of Alfred Hitchcock.

== Impact ==
The song inspired a trend on TikTok, where it was used in videos drawing attention to warning signs in relationships.

On November 8, Ashe performed "Stop the Wedding!" during the Love Is Blind season 11 finale. Six days later, she performed the song live at the 2026 Kids' Choice Awards, getting slimed at the end of the song.

== Charts ==
Chart performance for "Stop the Wedding!"
Chart (2026)	Peak position
Australia (ARIA)	5
Australia Airplay (RCS)	2
Austria (Ö3 Austria Top 40)	4
Austria Airplay (MusicTrace)	29
Belgium (Ultratop 50 Flanders)	7
Canada Hot 100 (Billboard)	8
Canada CHR/Top 40 (Billboard)	36
Colombia Anglo Airplay (Monitor Latino)	15
CIS Airplay (TopHit)	22
Croatia International Airplay (Top lista)	47
Czech Republic Singles Digital (ČNS IFPI)	25
Estonia Airplay (TopHit)	91
France (SNEP)	105
Germany (GfK)	7
Germany Airplay (MusicTrace)	34
Global 200 (Billboard)	3
Greece International (IFPI)	3
Iceland (Billboard)	23
Indonesia (IFPI)	11
Ireland (IRMA)	1
Italy Airplay (EarOne)	55
Kazakhstan Airplay (TopHit)	53
Latvia Airplay (LaIPA)	6
Latvia Streaming (LaIPA)	13
Lebanon (Lebanese Top 20)	3
Lithuania (AGATA)	13
Lithuania Airplay (TopHit)	35
Luxembourg (Billboard)	10
Malaysia (IFPI)	4
Malaysia International (RIM)	3
Malta Airplay (Radiomonitor)	16
Mexico Anglo Airplay (Monitor Latino)	1
Moldova Airplay (TopHit)	34
Netherlands (Dutch Top 40)	9
Netherlands (Single Top 100)	5
New Zealand (RMNZ)	5
New Zealand Airplay (RCS)	1
Nigeria (TurnTable Top 100)	95
Norway (VG-lista)	2
Philippines (IFPI)	5
Philippines Hot 100 (Billboard Philippines)	4
Poland Airplay (OLiS)	14
Poland Streaming (OLiS)	46
Portugal (AFP)	37
Russia Airplay (TopHit)	31
Singapore (RIAS)	8
Slovakia Airplay (ČNS IFPI)	35
Slovakia Singles Digital (ČNS IFPI)	47
South Africa Airplay (TOSAC)	15
Sweden (Sverigetopplistan)	14
Switzerland (Schweizer Hitparade)	9
Switzerland Airplay (MusicTrace)	39
United Arab Emirates (IFPI)	14
UK Singles (Official Charts)	2
US Billboard Hot 100	12
US Adult Pop Airplay (Billboard)	21
US Hot Rock & Alternative Songs (Billboard)	2
US Pop Airplay (Billboard)	19
Venezuela Anglo Airplay (Monitor Latino)	10

== Certifications ==
Certifications for "Stop the Wedding!"
Region	Certification	Certified units/sales
New Zealand (RMNZ)	Gold	15,000^{‡}
United Kingdom (BPI)	Silver	200,000^{‡}
^{‡} Sales+streaming figures based on certification alone.

== Release history ==
Release dates and formats for "Stop the Wedding!"
Region	Date	Format	Label(s)	Ref.
Italy	September 11, 2026	Radio airplay	Warner	
United States	September 29, 2026	Contemporary hit radio	Atlantic	
