= Will Hyde =

Australian singer-songwriter

- Born: 1999 (age 26–27); Melbourne, Australia
- Occupations: Singer; songwriter; producer

Will Hyde (born 1999), is an Australian singer, songwriter and producer.

== Life and career ==
Hyde is from Melbourne, Australia. He was part of an electro band called SŸDE as a teenager. He began releasing solo tracks in 2020. He released the track "dream." with YENTED and MRCH. In 2026 he released "Better Without Me" with Stephanie Poetri. He produced a Lipton commercial. He was an executive producer for the Australian team song for the Paris Olympics. He co-hosted the podcast Really Mental, about mental health topics.
