= Good Looking (song) =

Song by Suki Waterhouse

from the EP Milk Teeth
- Released: 20 October 2017
- Recorded: 2017
- Length: 3:34
- Label: Sub Pop Records
- Producer: Jules Apollinaire

Suki Waterhouse singles chronology
"Brutally" (2016)	"Good Looking" (2017)	"Valentine" (2018)

Music video
- "Good Looking" on YouTube

"Good Looking" is a song by British singer Suki Waterhouse. It was released through Sub Pop Records on October 20, 2017, as the first single from her debut EP, Milk Teeth. The song went viral on the app TikTok in 2022, simultaneously achieving commercial success.

== Background ==
The song delves into themes of love and self-identity. It was re-released in 2022. The song went viral on the app TikTok in 2022, simultaneously achieving commercial success. Suki Waterhouse performed it as the eighteenth and final song of her tour in support of her 2024 album, Memoir of a Sparklemuffin.

== Personnel ==
- Jules Apollinaire – composer, lyricist
- Natalie Findlay – composer, lyricist
- Lisa Luxx – lyricist

== Charts ==
Chart performance for "Good Looking"
Chart (2022–2023)	Peak position
Ireland (IRMA)	63
UK Indie (OCC)	18
UK Singles (Official Charts)	92
US Hot Rock & Alternative Songs (Billboard)	14

== Certifications and sales ==
Certifications for "Good Looking"
Region	Certification	Certified units/sales
Canada (Music Canada)	2× Platinum	160,000^{‡}
New Zealand (RMNZ)	Platinum	30,000^{‡}
United Kingdom (BPI)	Gold	400,000^{‡}
United States (RIAA)	2× Platinum	2,000,000^{‡}
^{‡} Sales+streaming figures based on certification alone.
