= Memoir of a Sparklemuffin =

Studio album by Suki Waterhouse
- Released: 13 September 2024
- Recorded: 2024
- Studio: Home Studio/Kingsize Soundlabs (Los Angeles, California)
- Genre: Pop
- Length: 53:27
- Label: Sub Pop
- Producers: Apob; Blue May; Boy Blue; Brad Cook; Collin Pastore; Eli Hirsch; Findlay; Fred Ball; Hazey Eyes; Jake Finch; Jane; John Mark Nelson; Jonathan Rado; Jules Apollinaire; Martin Wave; Noah Conrad; Peter Labberton

Suki Waterhouse chronology
I Can't Let Go (2022)	Memoir of a Sparklemuffin (2024)	Loveland (2026)

Singles from Memoir of a Sparklemuffin
- 1. "To Love" Released: 3 March 2023; 2. "OMG" Released: 11 January 2024; 3. "My Fun" Released: 11 April 2024; 4. "Faded" Released: 11 April 2024; 5. "Supersad" Released: 20 June 2024; 6. "Blackout Drunk" Released: 1 August 2024; 7. "Model, Actress, Whatever" Released: 10 September 2024

Memoir of a Sparklemuffin is the second studio album by the English singer Suki Waterhouse. It was released on September 13, 2024, by Sub Pop Records. The album is primarily a pop record featuring traces of rock and folk music. Memoir of a Sparklemuffin was Executive produced by Eli Hirsch. Other producers include Brad Cook, Hazy Eyes, Jules Apollinaire and Noah Conrad among others.

== Background ==
Sparklemuffin is the colloquial title for the Maratus jactatus spider native to Australia. The album boasts 18 tracks, but the deluxe version of the album adds 12 new tracks. It was released on September 13, 2024, by Sub Pop Records. The double album contains the live version of Suki's hit single, "Good Looking".

== Composition ==
"Memoir of a Sparklemuffin" was composed by Suki Waterhouse as a reflection on her life and career, using the concept of a spider's metamorphosis, specifically the "sparklemuffin" spider, as a metaphor for transformation. The album was mainly written while she was pregnant, and explores themes of metamorphosis, career challenges, and finding happiness.

== Critical reception ==
Professional ratings
Aggregate scores
Source	Rating
AnyDecentMusic?	6.6/10
Metacritic	75/100
Review scores
Source	Rating
AllMusic	4/5 stars
Clash	6/10 stars
DIY	3.5/5 stars
Dork	4/5 stars
Paste	6.3/10
The Independent	4/5 stars
The Line of Best Fit	7/10 stars
Under the Radar	5/10 stars

Memoir of a Sparklemuffin received positive reviews. At Metacritic, which assigns a rating out of 100 to reviews from professional publications, the album received a weighted average score of 75, based on six reviews, indicating "generally favorable reviews". The review aggregator site AnyDecentMusic? compiled 9 reviews and gave the album an average of 6.6 out of 10, based on their assessment of the critical consensus.

Emily Savage of The Line of Best Fit wrote that while the album "teeters along the fine line of becoming slightly too long at certain points," it offers an intimate look into the "thoughts and emotions" of the songstress at her "most vulnerable and empowered." She also praised the record as a clear "showcase of Waterhouse’s growth in songwriting". Savage also mentioned in her review that Waterhouse's stylings are reminiscent of singer-songwriter Lana Del Rey and the alternative rock band Wolf Alice.

About the record sound, DIY's Bella Martin noted that Waterhouse's "vision feels more coherent within the record’s heavier tracks," naming "Big Love", and "Supersad", as examples. Marcy Donelson of AllMusic compared the album to the "most extravagant works" of Lana Del Rey and Angel Olsen.

== Track listing ==
Memoir of a Sparklemuffin – standard edition
No.	Title	Writer(s)	Producer(s)	Length
1.	"Gateway Drug"	Suki Waterhouse; Chelsea Balan; Karissa Bone	Boy Blue; Eli Hirsch	2:41
2.	"Supersad"	Waterhouse; Balan; Lilian Caputo; John Mark Nelson	Hirsch; Brad Cook; Nelson	2:50
3.	"Blackout Drunk"	Waterhouse; Fred Ball; Natalie Findlay	Hirsch; Ball; Hazey Eyes	2:28
4.	"Faded"	Waterhouse; Raj Jain	Hirsch; Jain; Apob; Peter Labberton	2:55
5.	"Nonchalant"	Waterhouse; Balan; Trey Campbell	Hirsch; Eyes; Wave	2:20
6.	"My Fun"	Waterhouse; Findlay	Jules Apollinaire	2:42
7.	"Model, Actress, Whatever"	Waterhouse; EJ Saftner; Alexis Kesselman	Hirsch; Eyes	3:32
8.	"To Get You"	Waterhouse; Jonathan Rado; Saftner; Greg Gonzalez; Madison Love	Rado	4:03
9.	"Lullaby"	Waterhouse; Findlay	Apollinaire	2:03
10.	"Big Love"	Waterhouse; Mikky Ekko	Hirsch; Cook; Blue May; Collin Pastore; Jake Finch	3:19
11.	"Lawsuit"	Waterhouse; Nelson; Chloe Angelides; Balan	Hirsch; Eyes; Nelson; May	2:35
12.	"OMG"	Waterhouse; Findlay	Apollinaire	2:58
13.	"Think Twice"	Waterhouse; Kellen Pomeranz; Chelsea Cutler; Saftner	Hirsch; Cook; May	3:12
14.	"Could've Been A Star"	Waterhouse; Noah Conrad; Balan	Hirsch; Conrad	2:49
15.	"Legendary"	Waterhouse; Richard Nowels; Love	Hirsch	3:19
16.	"Everybody Breaks Up Anyway"	Waterhouse; Samuel Griffin Owens; Clare Rita Mary Maguire; Boy Matthews	Hirsch; May	2:36
17.	"Helpless"	Waterhouse; Saftner; Kesselman	Hirsch; Eyes	3:01
18.	"To Love"	Waterhouse; Findlay; Apollinaire	Apollinaire	3:56
Total length:				53:27

Deluxe edition
No.	Title	Writer(s)	Producer(s)	Length
19.	"The Bellboy (One Last Crush)"	Waterhouse; Findlay; Amanda Ghost; Saftner; Idarose	Hirsch; Jonny Coffer	3:28
20.	"Everything You Feared"	Waterhouse; Saftner; Idarose	Cook; Eyes; Idarose	3:33
21.	"So Close"	Waterhouse; Maguire	Hirsch; May	3:06
22.	"Mother"	Waterhouse; Findlay	Apollinaire	3:08
23.	"Cliffhanger"	Waterhouse; Findlay	Ball	3:57
24.	"Floating Down Confidence River"	Waterhouse; Saftner; Carrie K	K	3:12
25.	"Sexy to Someone (BBC Live from Maida Vale)"	Clairo; Leon Michels; Homer Steinweiss; Nick Movshon	Guy Worth	3:35
26.	"Dream Woman"	Waterhouse; Findlay	Apollinaire	4:08
27.	"On This Love"	Waterhouse; Saftner; Kesselman; Maguire; Zachary William "Bill" Dess	Feet	2:49
28.	"Yeah! Oh, Yeah! (Live from Brooklyn Paramount)" (with Stephin Merritt)	Merritt	Vinnie Ferra	3:14
29.	"My Fun (Live from Brooklyn Paramount)"	Waterhouse; Findlay	Ferra	3:15
30.	"Good Looking (Live from Brooklyn Paramount)"	Waterhouse; Lisa Luxx; Apollinaire; Findlay	Ferra	5:25
Total length:				1:36:00

== Personnel ==
- Suki Waterhouse – composer, lyricist
- Boy Blue – composer, producer (1)
- Karissa Bone – lyricist (1)
- Chelsea Balan – composer, lyricist (1, 2)
- Eli Hirsch – executive producer, producer (all tracks except; 4, 6, 8, 9, 12, 18), arranger (tracks 1–5)
- Brad Cook – arranger
- Chloe Angelides – composer, lyricist
- Mikky Ekko – composer, lyricist
- Blue May – producer (10, 11, 13), mixer
- Alex Farrar – mixer
- Richard Nowels – composer, lyricist (15)
- Jules Apollinaire – producer (12, 18)
- Natalie Findlay - composer, lyricist

Credits adapted from Tidal.

== Charts ==
Chart performance for Memoir of a Sparklemuffin
Chart (2024–2025)	Peak position
French Rock & Metal Albums (SNEP)	70
Scottish Albums (Official Charts)	46
UK Independent Albums (Official Charts)	14
US Independent Albums (Billboard)	45
US Top Album Sales (Billboard)	24
