= Rae (album) =

Studio album by Ashe
- Released: October 14, 2022
- Length: 39:33
- Label: Mom + Pop
- Producer: Leroy Clampitt

Ashe chronology
Ashlyn (2021)	Rae (2022)	Willson (2024)

Singles from Rae
- 1. "Another Man's Jeans" Released: March 3, 2022; 2. "Hope You're Not Happy" Released: May 6, 2022; 3. "Angry Woman" Released: June 22, 2022; 4. "Shower with My Clothes On" Released: July 29, 2022; 5. "Emotional" Released: August 26, 2022; 6. "Love Is Letting Go" Released: September 23, 2022; 7. "OMW" Released: October 12, 2022

Rae is the second studio album by American singer-songwriter Ashe. It was released on October 14, 2022, through Mom + Pop Music. After the release of her debut studio album Ashlyn (2021), she announced her new studio album entitled Rae. The album's title was adapted from her middle name, and Ashe stated that the album is "grounded in confidence, sexual freedom, excitement, and liberation". The album was supported by seven singles, "Another Man's Jeans", "Hope You're Not Happy", "Angry Woman", "Shower with My Clothes On", "Emotional", "Love Is Letting Go" and "OMW".

Clash scored Rae 7 out of 10, noting that while the album may not lift Ashe to the top of pop era, it represents a meaningful step forward in her career.

== Background ==
On May 7, 2021, Ashe released her debut studio album Ashlyn which received positive reviews. Reflecting on her debut album, Ashe said that its content was "so off the heels of my divorce and going through all this turmoil and toxicity". In contrast, she believes that Rae, titled after her middle name and envisioned as a metaphor for existing "between life and death", is "grounded in confidence, sexual freedom, excitement, and liberation".

== Release and promotion ==
Before the release of the album, she has previewed the record through several singles such as "Emotional", "Shower with My Clothes On", "Angry Woman", "Hope You're Not Happy" and "Another Man's Jeans". The first single is "Another Man's Jeans", released on March 3, 2022. Ashe performed the track on May 19 at Late Night with Seth Meyers. "Hope You're Not Happy" debuted on May 6, as the album's second single. On June 22, alongside the release of the third single "Angry Woman", Rae was announced to be released on October 14. The music video for "Angry Woman" was directed by Jason Lester and inspired by Yoko Ono's Cut Piece performance from 1964. Like Cut Piece, the video features Ashe's clothes being cut off her body until she is naked in the final shot. "Shower with My Clothes On" was served as fourth single in July 29, with Jason Lester-directed music video. The fifth single, "Emotional", was released in August 26, 2022, alongside its Jason Lester-directed music video. "Love Is Getting Go" was released as sixth single from the album on September 23. "OMW" was released as the last single from the album, on October 12, along with the final Jason Lester-directed music video from the album.

== Critical reception ==
Rae ratings
Review scores
Source	Rating
Clash	7/10

Nicholas Graves of Clash noted that while the album may not propel Ashe to the top tier of pop music, it represents a meaningful step forward in her career and "should be more than just a footnote".

== Track listing ==
Rae track listing
No.	Title	Writer(s)	Producer(s)	Length
1.	"Rae's Theme"	Ashlyn Willson; Leroy Clampitt	Clampitt	0:38
2.	"Another Man's Jeans"	Willson; Clampitt	Clampitt	2:45
3.	"Hope You're Not Happy"	Willson; John Ryan; Ian Franzino; Andrew Haas	Clampitt; Ryan; Afterhrs	2:44
4.	"Shower with My Clothes On"	Willson; Ryan; Franzino; Haas	Clampitt; Ryan; Afterhrs	3:04
5.	"OMW"	Willson; Steph Jones; Casey Smith; Clampitt; Noah Conrad	Clampitt; Conrad	2:51
6.	"Angry Woman"	Willson; Jones; Clampitt	Clampitt	2:33
7.	"Emotional"	Willson; Smith; Clampitt; Conrad	Clampitt; Conrad	2:40
8.	"Love You Need"	Willson; Smith; Clampitt; Conrad	Clampitt; Conrad	3:15
9.	"It Can't Be You"	Willson; Smith; Conrad	Clampitt; Conrad	3:04
10.	"Loose Ends"	Willson; Clampitt	Clampitt	4:03
11.	"San Jose"	Willson; Clampitt	Clampitt	3:17
12.	"Love Is Letting Go" (featuring Diane Keaton)	Willson; Jones; Clampitt; Conrad	Clampitt; Conrad	2:34
13.	"Count on Me"	Willson; Clampitt	Clampitt	3:39
14.	"Fun While It Lasted"	Willson; Jones; Clampitt; Conrad	Clampitt; Conrad	2:26
Total length:				39:33
