= Ttrruuces =

English psychedelic rock band

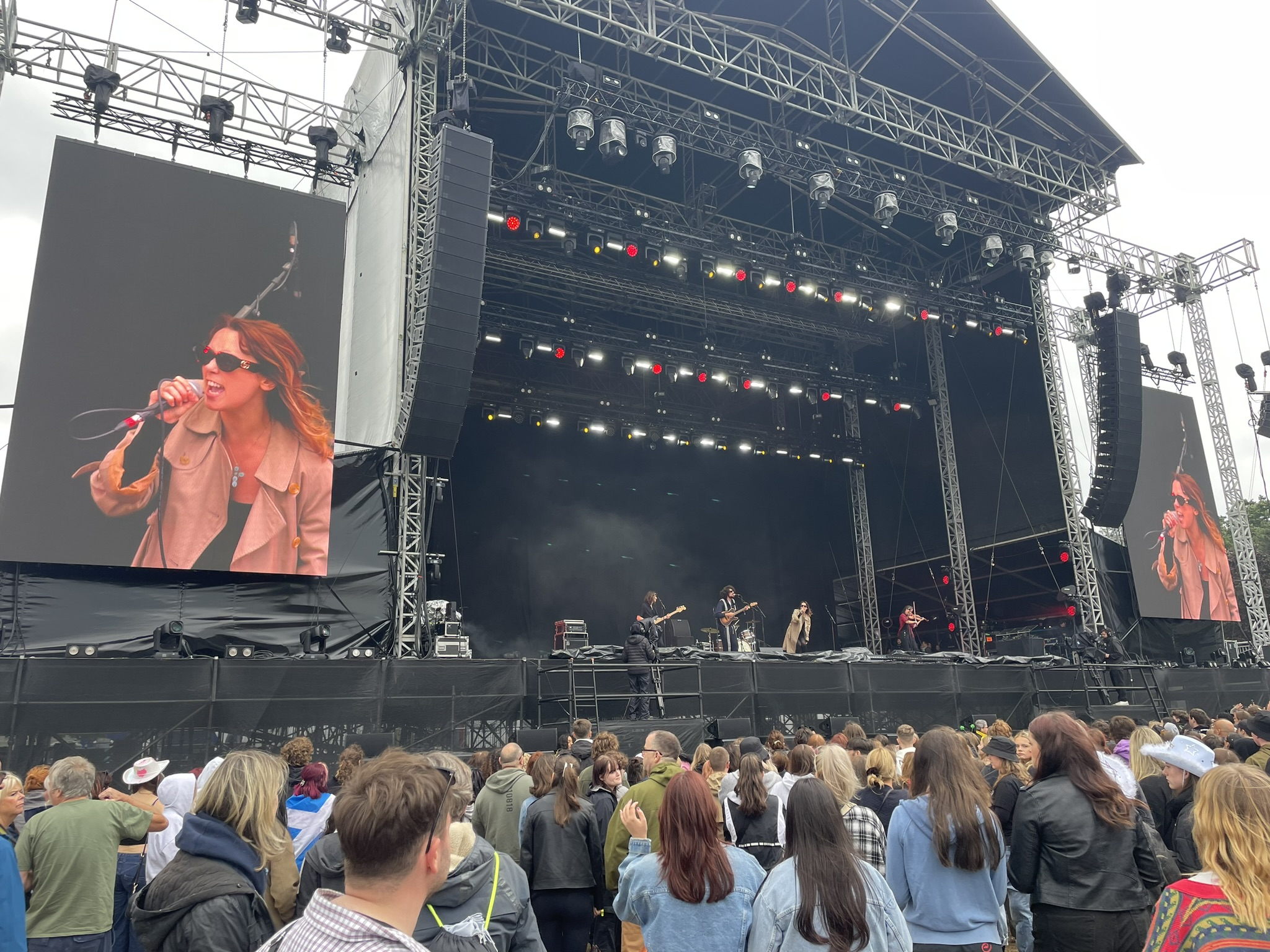
- Ttrruuces performing at Wythenshawe Park in 2024

Background information
- Origin: London, England
- Genres: Psychedelic rock
- Years active: 2019–present
- Label: AllPoints
- Members: Jules Apollinaire; Natalie Findlay
- Website: ttrruuces.com

Ttrruuces (stylized in all caps) are an English psychedelic rock band, formed by Jules Apollinaire and Natalie Findlay in 2019. The band was based in London but then relocated to France for a year to fully immerse themselves in creating their debut album.

The band "Rock opera" started as a project that focuses on two fictional characters and their quest to acquire a new drug named TTRRUUCES that will take them on a mind-altering journey.

The concept of their debut album has a narration throughout the eleven tracks accompanied by a video, with the project coming together to make a coming-of-age film, wherein Sadie (Sad Girl) and Syd (Lost Boy) are trying to find their way in an often bleak world.

== History ==
=== Origins ===
Jules Apollinaire and Natalie Findlay first met in the summer of 2014. As they both lived on Broadway Market in East London, they started to hang out to later realize how alike they were. Natalie said in an interview "Within days of meeting each other we started jamming and writing songs together and very fast we were living together making music all the time. We always knew we'd start a band together. After three years, the idea of TTRRUUCES was born."

When asked about the name and its meaning, Jules mentioned since he was a kid, he would play around with letters trying to find symmetries within the structure of words. "It was a bit obsessive so I made it into a whole game that continues until today. It's those mind games that made me write the word TTRRUUCES on a note. Natalie noticed it one day and loved it and we were like ‘ttrruuuuuces.’ We straight away wrote the song “TTRRUUCES” and adopted the name. The word stuck with us."

=== 2019–2020: Debut album ===
On 18 October 2019, Ttrruuces released their first single "Sad Girl". Their debut album, Ttrruuces, followed in June 2020. In October of the same year, they released a cover of "I Put a Spell on You" by Screamin' Jay Hawkins.

=== 2023-present: Jjuuiices ===
On 8 March 2023, "You Make Me Feel Good" was released via AntiFragile Music, followed by "Tainted Blue" on 14 April and "Stfu" on 24 May. On 12 July, they released "Snakes" and announced their second album Jjuuiices with a scheduled release date of 20 October 2023.

== Discography ==
=== Studio albums ===
List of studio albums, with selected details
Title	Album details
Ttrruuces	Released: 26 June 2020; Label: Allpoints
Jjuuiices	Released: 20 October 2023; Label: AntiFragile

=== Singles ===
List of singles, showing year released and album name
Title	Year	Album
"Sad Girl"	2019	Ttrruuces
"Ttrruuces" / "Lost Boy"	2020	Ttrruuces
"Sensations of Cool"	2020	Ttrruuces
"Evil Elephant"	2020	Ttrruuces
"I'm Alive"	2020	Ttrruuces
"I Put a Spell on You"	2020	Non-album single
"You Make Me Feel Good"	2023	Jjuuiices
"Tainted Blue"	2023	Jjuuiices
"Stfu"	2023	Jjuuiices
"Snakes"	2023	Jjuuiices
