= Till Forever Falls Apart =

2021 single by Ashe and Finneas

Single by Ashe and Finneas

from the album Ashlyn
- Released: March 2, 2021
- Length: 3:42
- Label: Mom + Pop
- Songwriters: Ashlyn Wilson; Finneas O'Connell; Leroy Clampitt
- Producers: Finneas; Clampitt

Ashe singles chronology
"Real Love" (2021)	"Till Forever Falls Apart" (2021)	"I’m Fine" (2021)

Finneas singles chronology
"American Cliché" (2021)	"Till Forever Falls Apart" (2021)	"A Concert Six Months From Now" (2021)

"Till Forever Falls Apart" is a song by American singer-songwriters Ashe and Finneas, and is the third single from Ashe's debut studio album Ashlyn (2021). It was released on March 2, 2021 by Mom + Pop Music. The song was written by the artists alongside Leroy Clampitt and produced by Finneas and Clampitt. Finneas previously co-wrote and produced Ashe's Moral of the Story EPs and its title track.

== Background and promotion ==
In a statement Ashe said, "'Till Forever Falls Apart' is one of my favorite songs with one of my favorite people. If I’ve learned anything from 'Moral of the Story,' it’s that accepting the hard truth is strangely comforting." She added, "Finneas is one of the most talented people I know and it’s fitting to release this song with someone I love so much. I'm lucky to know him and I hope to never know a life without him in it." Finneas responded, saying "Ashe to me, is a timeless artist. Her music will be as relevant and important 30 years from now as it is today. Making music with her has always been an extension of our friendship and I could not love this song more."

The song was accompanied by a music video directed by Sam Bennett. It stars the duo in a California desert dancing in a "vintage ballroom swing style" inspired by Ginger Rogers.

"Till Forever Falls Apart" was performed on Jimmy Kimmel Live! on March 3, 2021.

== Critical reception ==
Heran Mamo wrote for Billboard that "Till Forever Falls Apart" "erupts with the swelling emotion of love and how it can weather any storm, earthquake or natural disaster."

== Personnel ==
Credits adapted from Tidal.

- Finneas – producer, songwriter
- Leroy Clampitt – producer, songwriter
- Ashlyn Wilson – songwriter
- John Greenham – engineer
- Manny Marroquin – mixer

== Charts ==
=== Weekly charts ===
Weekly chart performance for "Till Forever Falls Apart"
Chart (2021)	Peak position
Ireland (IRMA)	75
New Zealand Hot Singles (RMNZ)	27
US Adult Pop Airplay (Billboard)	31
US Hot Rock & Alternative Songs (Billboard)	19

=== Year-end charts ===
Year-end chart performance for "Till Forever Falls Apart"
Chart (2021)	Position
US Hot Rock & Alternative Songs (Billboard)	63

== Certifications ==
Certifications for "Till Forever Falls Apart"
Region	Certification	Certified units/sales
New Zealand (RMNZ)	Platinum	30,000^{‡}
United Kingdom (BPI)	Silver	200,000^{‡}
United States (RIAA)	Gold	500,000^{‡}
^{‡} Sales+streaming figures based on certification alone.

== Release history ==
Release dates and formats for "Till Forever Falls Apart"
Region	Date	Format(s)	Label	Ref.
Various	March 2, 2021	Digital download; streaming	Mom + Pop	
United States	March 8, 2021	Hot adult contemporary radio	Mom + Pop	
United States	March 9, 2021	Alternative radio	Mom + Pop	
United States	March 9, 2021	Contemporary hit radio	Mom + Pop	
