= Ashe (singer) =

American singer-songwriter (born 1993)

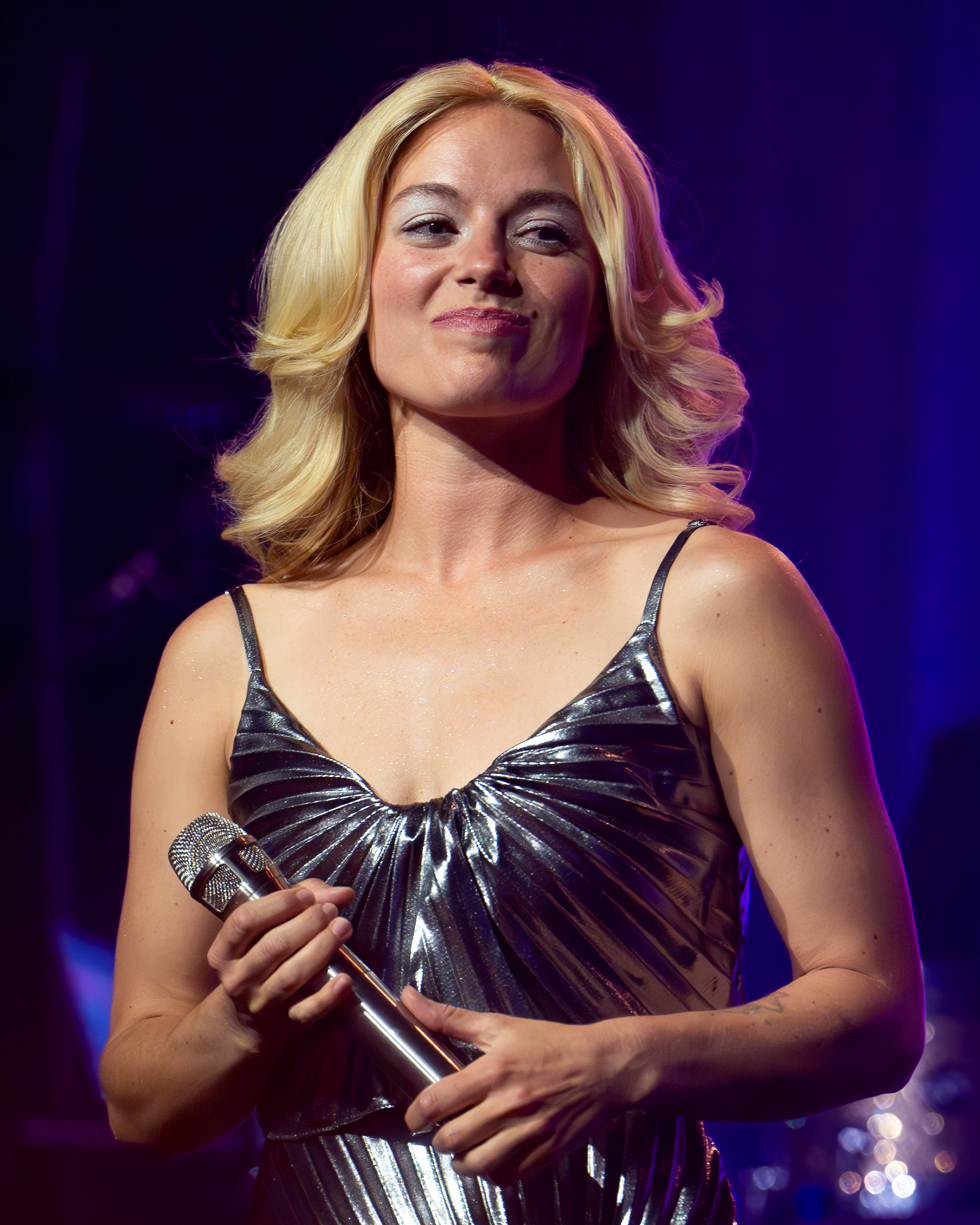
- Ashe in 2025
- Born: Ashlyn Rae Willson; April 24, 1993 (age 33); San Jose, California, U.S.
- Occupation: Singer-songwriter
- Years active: 2015–present
- Works: Discography
- Spouse: John Canada (m. 2025)
- Musical career
- Origin: Nashville, Tennessee
- Genres: Pop; indie folk; indie pop; alternative pop
- Instruments: Vocals; keyboards; piano
- Labels: Mom + Pop; Atlantic
- Publisher: Doomsday
- Member of: The Favors
- Website: ashe-music.com

Ashlyn Rae "Ashe" Canada (née Willson; born April 24, 1993) is an American singer-songwriter. She is known for her 2019 single "Moral of the Story", which was featured in the Netflix film To All the Boys: P.S. I Still Love You (2020) and was produced by Noah Conrad with additional production from Finneas O'Connell.

Ashe co-wrote American singer Demi Lovato's 2017 single "You Don't Do It for Me Anymore", and has toured with Louis the Child, Lauv, and Whethan. She was nominated for a Juno Award for her gold-certified single "Let You Get Away" with Shaun Frank. Her debut studio album, Ashlyn, was released on May 7, 2021, peaking at number 194 on the US Billboard 200. Rae and Willson, her second and third studio albums, were released in 2022 and 2024, respectively. However, both failed to chart in the US Billboard 200.

In 2025, Ashe and her longtime collaborator O'Connell created a band, named The Favors. They released their debut studio album, The Dream, in September. It peaked at the number of 174 on the US Billboard 200.

In 2026, she released "Stop the Wedding!", the lead single of her fourth studio album, The Girl of Your Dreams.

== Life and career ==
=== 1993–2014: Early life and family ===
Ashlyn Rae Willson was born in San Jose, California, on April 24, 1993. (Note: Nylon magazine published June 22, 2022, described Ashe as the "28-year-old Californian singer-songwriter", while V published on July 11, 2022, noted her age as 29, indicating that she was born in between June and July 1993.) She spent her childhood and upbringing in the city, and began attending piano and vocal lessons at the age of 8. Ashe said that she grew up listening only to Christian radio and that she thanked her grandfather for introducing her to music from names like Bob Dylan, The Beatles, and Jefferson Airplane. She attended Berklee College of Music and graduated with a major in contemporary writing and production in 2015.

=== 2015–2017: Career beginnings ===
Ashe started out by singing demos in Nashville before catching the attention of Swedish producer Ben Phipps, who asked her to sing on his track "Sleep Alone" in 2015. Over the next two years, Ashe specialized in appearing on a number of tracks from Louis the Child, Whethan and among others. Her 2016 single, "Can't Hide" with Whethan, was her fifth number 2 on both the US and Global Spotify Viral 50 charts. DJ Shaun Frank's 2016 single "Let You Get Away" featuring Ashe was nominated for Dance Recording of the Year at the 2017 Juno Awards, being certified gold in Canada in 2019. Ashe assisted American singer Demi Lovato in composing her 2017 single "You Don't Do It for Me Anymore" from Lovato's sixth studio album, Tell Me You Love Me (2017).

Between October 2017 and January 2018, Ashe embarked on tours with Louis the Child, Lauv, and Whethan. After signing to Mom + Pop independent label, she released her debut single "Used to It" in June 2017 and "Girl Who Cried Wolf" in November. The former was her second single to reach number 1 on the Global Spotify Viral 50 chart. Ashe was placed alongside Billie Eilish and Lewis Capaldi on Vevo's list of Artists to Watch in 2018. Throughout April 2017, Ashe supported the Chainsmokers during their Memories Do Not Open Tour and performed onstage with Big Gigantic during Coachella Festival 2017.

=== 2018–2020: The Rabbit Hole & Moral of the Story EPs ===
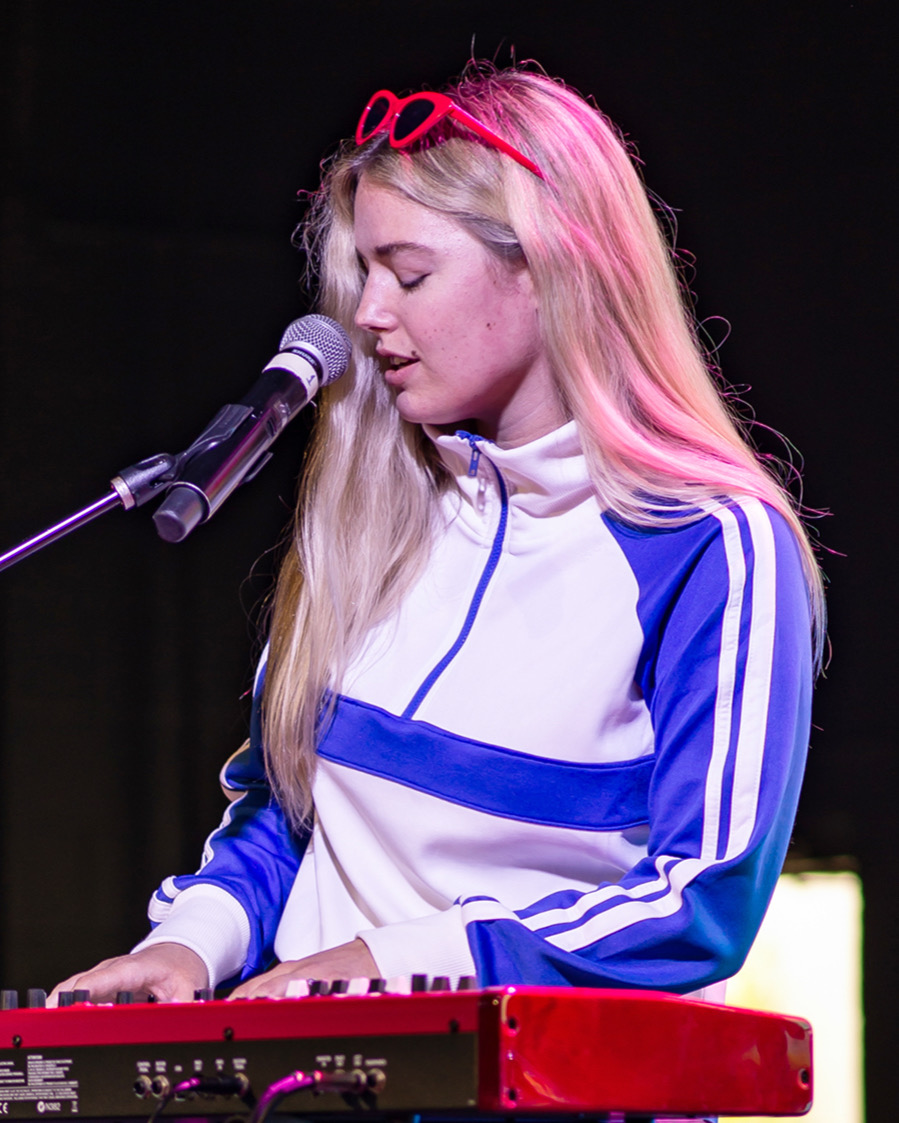
Ashe performing in 2018

Ashe released her debut extended play (EP), The Rabbit Hole, in June 2018. In February 2019, she supported American singer Quinn XCII on his From Michigan with Love World Tour, during which she released her single "Moral of the Story". On April 5, Ashe released her second EP composed of four tracks, titled Moral of the Story: Chapter 1, which American producer Finneas O'Connell entirely produced. He also produced three of the four tracks on her sequel EP, Moral of the Story: Chapter 2.

In February 2020, "Moral of the Story" was used in the Netflix teen rom-com, To All the Boys: P.S. I Still Love You (2020), which caused the song to reach number 2 on both Global and US Spotify Viral 50 chart. Ashe made her debut chart appearance on the US Billboard Hot 100 with the song, and the Billboard 200 with the EP Moral of the Story: Chapter 1. She also released a duet of "Moral of the Story" in June 19, featuring Niall Horan. They performed the song at The Late Late Show with James Corden on November 11.

=== 2021–2023: Ashlyn and Rae ===
In March 2021, Ashe and O'Connell released a song, titled "Till Forever Falls Apart". Her debut studio album, Ashlyn, was released on May 7, which includes six overall singles—"Moral of the Story", "Save Myself", "Till Forever Falls Apart", "I'm Fine", "When I'm Older", and "Me Without You"—issued prior to the album. Ashlyn debuted at number 194 on the US Billboard 200 dated May 22. In May, she announced her first headlining tour, The Fault Line Tour, beginning at Vancouver, BC in April 2022 and concluding at Denver, CO in May 11. The Nashville-based band, The Brook & The Bluff supported the tour. On March 3, 2022, Ashe released a single "Another Man's Jeans" after releasing snippets of the song on social media. She released the next single "Hope You're Not Happy" on May 6, featuring its Muriel Margaret-directed music video. In June, Ashe performed her second headlining concert titled Is It Me or Is It Hot Summer Tour, at Bonnaroo.

On June 22, Ashe announced her second studio album, Rae, the same day that she released the song "Angry Woman". She released four more singles from the album: "Shower with My Clothes On" on July 29, "Emotional" on August 26, "Love Is Letting Go" on September 23, and "OMW", along with its music video on October 12, 2022. The album was released on October 14, and it failed to chart on the US Billboard 200. On November 4, she released a single with Stephen Sanchez, titled "Missing You". Throughout 2023, she was scheduled to embark on her Fun While It Lasted Tour; however, it was canceled on February 1, since she did not feel "mentally healthy or resilient enough to go back on tour yet".

=== 2024–present: Willson, The Dream, and The Girl of Your Dreams ===
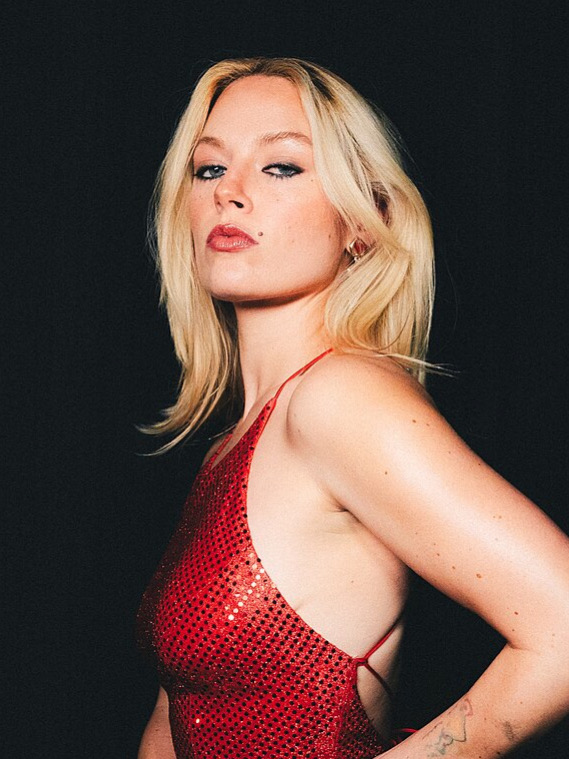
Ashe in 2025

On June 21, 2024, Ashe gave her first live performance in over a year when she performed "Moral of the Story" with Irish singer Niall Horan during his Saratoga Springs show on his tour, The Show: Live on Tour. On June 27, she announced her third studio album and first independent album, titled Willson. Its lead single, "Running Out of Time", was released a day after of the album's announcement. The album was released on September 6 and failed to enter the US Billboard 200. She also announced her first tour in three years, titled the Trilogy Tour, in support of her three studio albums. In January and February 2025, she supported American singers Kelsea Ballerini and Gracie Abrams's tour, Live on Tour and The Secret of Us Tour, respectively.

Ashe and Finneas O'Connell created a band, The Favors, and released their debut single "The Little Mess You Made" on June 7, 2025. Their debut studio album, The Dream, followed on September 19. It peaked at numbers 174 and 42 on the US Billboard 200 and Top Rock & Alternative Albums chart, respectively. The album also charted the top 50 in Belgium, the Netherlands, and Scotland. The pair performed its accompanying tour, An Evening with the Favors, from September 18 at Hollywood Forever Cemetery in Los Angeles, concluding on October 3 – 10 at Austic City Limits Music Festival in Austin. That year, Ashe also joined Finneas's publishing company Doomsday, run by Universal Music Publishing Group.

In August 2026, Ashe announced her next album, The Girl of Your Dreams, was scheduled for release October 16, 2026. The first single released was "Stop the Wedding!"

== Artistry ==
Ashe stated that jazz music, American actress Diane Keaton, and American songwriter Carole King are major influences as well as inspirations to her own music; Ashe put an "e" on her stagename to pay homage to King. Other artists that she admires are Stevie Nicks, ABBA, Queen, Elton John, Ella Fitzgerald, John Mayer, and Olivia Rodrigo.

Ashe is a pop, indie folk, indie pop, and alternative pop singer that incorporates indie and folk pop sounds. According to the description of Ashe's debut album Ashlyn, its sounds balance between pop and alternative music. Her second album Rae combines elements of electro-pop and indie folk; she adopts those genres in its track "Shower with My Clothes On", while another track "Another Man's Jeans" features 1970s folk-pop and rock sounds.

== Personal life ==
Ashe was previously married and divorced. She became engaged to musician John Canada in July 2024, and they married in October 2025.

Her brother, Ryne, died of an overdose in 2020. She had dedicated songs such as "Ryne's Song", which also includes a voicemail he left her, and "Love Is Letting Go" to him.

== Discography ==
=== Solo studio albums ===
- Ashlyn (2021)
- Rae (2022)
- Willson (2024)
- The Girl of Your Dreams (2026)

=== With the Favors ===
- The Dream (2025)

== Tours ==
=== Headlining ===
- The Fault Line Tour (2022)
- Is It Me or Is It Hot Summer Tour (2022)
- Fun While It Lasted Tour (2022)
- Trilogy Tour (2025)
- The Girl of Your Dreams Tour (2027)

=== With the Favors ===
- An Evening with the Favors (2025)

=== Opening act ===
- Lauv – I Met You When I Was 18. World Tour (2018)
- Kelsea Ballerini – Live on Tour (2025)
- Gracie Abrams – The Secret of Us Tour (2025)
- Benson Boone – Wanted Man Tour (2026)

== Awards and nominations ==
Year	Awards	Nominated work	Award	Result	Ref.
2026	Berlin Music Video Awards	The Favors – "The Little Mess You Made"	Best Song	Nominated	
