= Findlay (musician) =

English musician (born 1992)

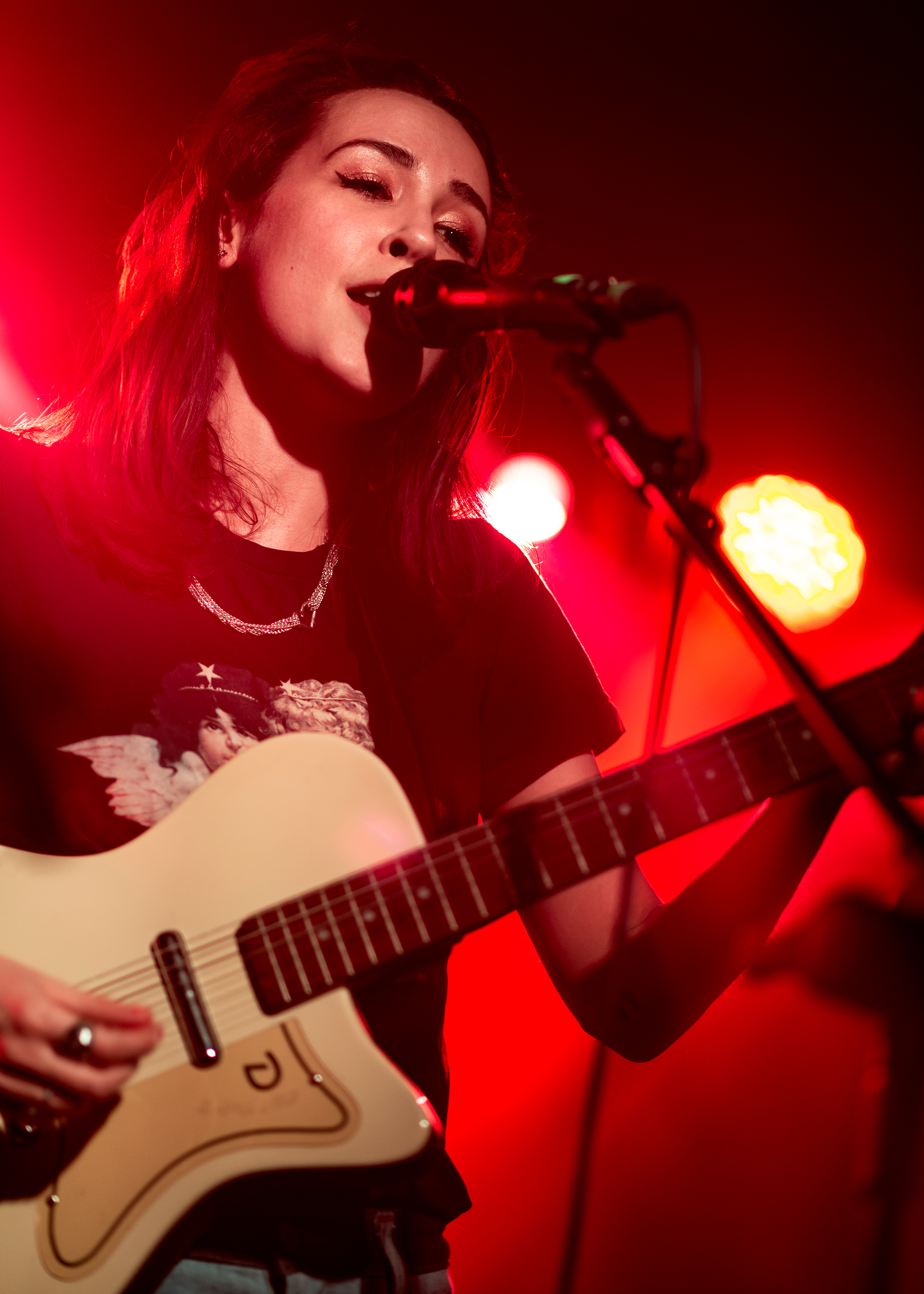
- Findlay performing live at the Moroccan Lounge in Los Angeles, California in 2018.

Background information
- Born: Natalie Rose Findlay; 7 June 1992 (age 34); Stockport, England
- Genres: Indie rock; Alternative
- Occupations: Musician; Singer-songwriter
- Instruments: Vocals; guitar
- Years active: 2007–present
- Labels: BMG Rights Management; Mint; Polydor; Joyeux Anniversaire; Kartel Music Group
- Website: findlayfindlay.com

Natalie Rose Findlay (born 7 June 1992), known professionally as Findlay, is an English musician, artist and songwriter originally from Stockport, England. Alongside being a solo artist, she is also in the band Ttrruuces alongside collaborator Jules Apollinaire.

== Early life ==
Findlay started playing the guitar when she was around 15 and after about a year began writing songs. She took up music because she was not interested in anything else growing up. She has joked that she "can't really do anything else."

== Music career ==
=== 2010–2014: Polydor ===
On 24 November 2013, Findlay released her second EP Greasy Love. However, after disagreements with her record label, Polydor, Findlay was granted a release from her contract with the company.

=== 2015–2016: BMG ===
Findlay created her own label Mint Records and signed with BMG. On 9 February 2015 the video for the single "Electric Bones" was released online and the Electric Bones EP was released digitally on 4 September 2015. In March 2015 Findlay released the single "Wolfback" which samples from the Ratatat song "Loud Pipes". The video for "Junk Food" premiered on 4 November 2015 on Clash.

=== 2017–2018: Forgotten Pleasures ===
The single "Waste My Time" was released in January 2017, followed by the release of Findlay's debut studio album Forgotten Pleasures on 3 March 2017.

=== 2019–present: The Last Of The 20th Century Girls, TTRRUUCES and co-writes ===
In June 2019, Findlay announced she was working on her second studio album via Instagram post. In 2019, she also started a new project called Ttrruuces along with her debut album's co-producer Jules Apollinaire. Their self-titled debut album was released on 26 June 2020. Their second album JJUUIICES was announced on the band's Instagram page to be released on October 20, 2023.

In September 2021, Findlay released her new single "Life is but a Dream".

Findlay released her second studio album, Last Of The 20th Century Girls, on May 13, 2022.

Findlay has collaborated with multiple artists, most notably her co-writes with model, singer and actress Suki Waterhouse with the song "Good Looking" now certified platinum, she also wrote the singles “My Fun,” “OMG,” “To Love” and “Blackout Drunk” from Suki’s sophomore album “Memoir of a Sparklemuffin.”

Findlay was featured guest vocalist with Blossoms on their single To Do List (After the Breakup), released on 9th October 2023.

Findlay has been in recent collaboration with New York artist Remy Bond, notably contributing writing to Remy’s viral hit “Summer Song” as well as songs “Don’t Go Back To Paris,” “Red, White and Blue” and “Star Shaped Baby.”

== Personal life ==
Findlay is a vegetarian and has been in a relationship with her TTRRUUCES bandmate and frequent collaborator Jules Apollinaire since 2014.

== Discography ==
=== Studio albums ===
Title	Album details	Peak chart positions
Title	Album details	UK
Forgotten Pleasures	Released: 3 March 2017; Label: BMG; Format: digital download, limited edition vinyl, cd	—N/a
The Last Of The 20th Century Girls	Released: 13 May 2022; Label: Kartel Music Group; Format: digital download, limited edition vinyl, cd	—N/a

=== EPs ===
Title	Album details	Peak chart positions
Title	Album details	UK
Off & On	Released: 15 April 2013; Label: Joyeux Anniversaire; Format: digital download, limited edition vinyl	—N/a
Greasy Love	Released: 24 November 2013; Label: Polydor; Format: digital download	—N/a
Electric Bones	Released: 4 September 2015; Label: BMG; Format: digital download	—N/a
Stay Kinky	Released: 14 February 2025; Label: Key Records; Format: digital download	—N/a

=== Singles ===
Title	Year	Peak chart positions				Album
Title	Year	UK	US	GER	FRA	Album
"Your Sister"	2012	—	—	—	—	Non-album single
"Off & On"	2013	—	—	—	—	Off & On EP
"Greasy Love"	2013	—	—	—	—	Greasy Love EP
"Electric Bones"	2015	—	—	—	—	Electric Bones EP
"Wolfback"	2015	—	—	—	—	Non-album single
"Junk Food"	2015	—	—	—	—	Electric Bones EP
"Wild & Unwise"	2016	—	—	—	—	Forgotten Pleasures
"Waste My Time"	2017	—	—	—	—	Forgotten Pleasures
"Monomania (Nobody Loves You Like I Love You)"	2017	—	—	—	—	Forgotten Pleasures
"Life Is But A Dream"	2021	—	—	—	—	The Last of the 20th Century Girls
"Strange One"	2021	—	—	—	—	The Last of the 20th Century Girls
"Night Sweats"	2022	—	—	—	—	The Last of the 20th Century Girls
"Ride"	2022	—	—	—	—	The Last of the 20th Century Girls
"The End Of The world"	2022	—	—	—	—	The Last of the 20th Century Girls
"Jessie’s House"	2024	—	—	—	—	NA
"Summer’s Almost Over "	2024	—	—	—	—	Stay Kinky
"Juicy Fruit "	2024	—	—	—	—	Stay Kinky
"It’s a Pleasure "	2025	—	—	—	—	Stay Kinky
"Fish Bowl"	2025	—	—	—	—	Stay Kinky
"Somebody’s Watching Me"	2025	—	—	—	—	NA

- Featured Artist

Title	Year	Peak chart positions				Album
Title	Year	UK	US	GER	FRA	Album
"Let You Down" (Joris Delacroix featuring Findlay)	2018	—	—	—	—	Let You Down
"To Do List (After the Breakup)" (Blossoms featuring Findlay)	2023	—	—	—	—	Gary

=== Touring ===
Along with performing at major festival stages, Findlay has toured in support of such notable acts as Suki Waterhouse, Jake Bugg, the Courteeners, Brandon Flowers and Miles Kane.

Findlay made her United States debut on 12 March 2018 in Los Angeles. She also played at several 2018 SXSW showcases.

=== In other media ===
- 2014: "Off & On", featured in a BMW commercial which premiered during the 2014 Winter Olympics
- 2015: "Greasy Love", featured in season three premiere episode of the Cinemax drama, Banshee.
- 2016: "Electric Bones", featured in an episode of TNT's drama, Good Behavior
- 2017: "Monomania (Nobody Loves You Like I Love You)", featured on the premiere of MTV's Catfish
- 2018: "Waste My Time", featured in an episode of Stan's TV series Younger
- 2018: "Stoned and Alone", featured in "The Precious Blood of Jesus", an episode of Netflix's Ozark
- 2018: "Off & On", soundtrack for the Konami Sports-related videogame Pro Evolution Soccer 2018
- 2022: "Off & On" featured song on "Dead Island 2" trailer.

== Official Videos ==
Year	Song	Director	Album
2012	"Your Sister"		Your Sister
2013	"Off & On"	Stephen Agnew	Off & On EP
2013	"Greasy Love"	Ruffmercy	Greasy Love EP
2015	"Electric Bones"	Sasha Rainbow	Electric Bones EP
2015	"Wolfback"		Non-album Single
2015	"Junk Food"		Electric Bones EP
2016	"Wild & Unwise"	Steve Glashier	Forgotten Pleasures
2017	"Waste My Time"		Forgotten Pleasures
2017	"Monomania (Nobody Loves You Like I Love You)"	Ben Charles Edwards	Forgotten Pleasures
2021	"Life Is But A Dream"	Natalie Findlay	The Last of the 20th Century Girls
2021	"Strange One"	Natalie Findlay	The Last of the 20th Century Girls
2022	"Night Sweats"	Natalie Findlay	The Last of the 20th Century Girls
2022	"The End of the World"	Natalie Findlay	The Last of the 20th Century Girls
2022	"Ride"	Natalie Findlay	The Last of the 20th Century Girls
