= Ashlyn (album) =

Studio album by Ashe
- Released: May 7, 2021
- Length: 47:03
- Label: Mom + Pop
- Producers: Noah Conrad; Jason Evigan; Leroy Clampitt; Finneas; Michael Pollack

Ashe chronology
Moral of the Story: Chapter 2 (2019)	Ashlyn (2021)	Rae (2022)

Singles from Ashlyn
- 1. "Moral of the Story" Released: February 14, 2019; 2. "Save Myself" Released: July 22, 2020; 3. "Till Forever Falls Apart" Released: March 2, 2021; 4. "I'm Fine" Released: April 8, 2021; 5. "When I'm Older" Released: April 21, 2021; 6. "Me Without You" Released: May 5, 2021

Ashlyn is the debut studio album by American singer-songwriter Ashe. It was released by Mom + Pop Music on May 7, 2021. The album explores themes of heartbreak, fear, independence, and self-reflection, drawing from Ashe's personal experiences and relationships. Ashlyn combines California pop and contemporary production with influences from 1970s pop and rock musicians like Elton John, Queen, and ABBA. The album was primarily produced by Leroy Clampitt, with whom Ashe co-wrote much of the record.

Ashlyn was supported by six singles—"Moral of the Story", "Save Myself", "Till Forever Falls Apart" featuring Finneas, "I'm Fine", "When I'm Older", and "Me Without You"—and later by the Fault Line Tour. Upon release, it debuted at number 194 on the US Billboard 200, marking her second entry on the chart. It also reached number 2 on the US Heatseekers Albums chart. Critical reception highlighted its ambitious arrangements, melodic songwriting, and emotionally personal material.

== Background and theme ==
In March 2020, Ashe described her then upcoming debut studio album as an extension of her established Laurel Canyon-inspired songwriting style, while citing the Beach Boys' 1966 album Pet Sounds as its primary musical influence. She also identified Finneas as an important creative collaborator, comparing his musical approach to that of Brian Wilson.

Ashe commented in 2021 that Ashlyn was "deeply reflective and honest", which drew on her experiences of fear and pain as well as explored themes of joy and independence. She also stated that some alternative titles—A Matter of Time and The Faultline—were considered before she chose Ashlyn, which she felt best represented the album's personal nature. Ashe did not consider Ashlyn to be strictly a breakup album, instead she described it as a reflection of her life experiences, including failed relationships. In an interview with Euphoria magazine, she revealed that she had wanted the album's sounds to be "marriage between worlds of old and new".

Ashe intentionally avoided making a "safe" record, saying that Ashlyn was a personal and creatively "risky" project. She explained that it was shaped by her own experiences and stories, and said she wanted to create "the exact album" she envisioned regardless of whether it would appeal to everyone. A New Zealand producer Leroy Clampitt played a significant role in the making of Ashlyn, who was "the only right person" to create the album with, since Ashe felt he respected both her ideas and creative direction. Ashe also said that, following the death of her brother, there was "no one else" she could have written "Ryne's Song" with.

== Composition ==
In an interview with Nylon, Ashe expressed pride in Ashlyn's off-kilter sound, embracing the perception of her music as "too pop for alternative and too alternative for pop" as a defining characteristic. With production handled by Ashe and Clampitt, the album combines elements of California and 1970s pop with 2020s production styles, featuring layered soundscapes, melodic hooks, and unconventional chord progressions. Chris DeVille of Stereogum described Ashlyn's composition as being "steeped in ornate arrangements and classic sounds".

Co-written with Sean Douglas, "Not Mad Anymore" was heavily inspired by British and American rock bands, such as Queen and the Beach Boys. About the lyric in "Till Forever Falls Apart"—"We've been living on a fault line"—Ashe explained that she viewed it as a metaphor for the fragility of relationships.

== Release and promotion ==
Following the release of two singles—"Moral of the Story" on February 24, 2019, and "Save Myself" on July 22, 2020—"Till Forever Falls Apart" (featuring Finneas) followed on March 2, 2021, serving as the third single of Ashlyn. Directed by Sam Bennett and choreographed by Monika Felice Smith, its music video was unveiled at the same day. On April 7, Ashe announced her debut studio album, Ashlyn, and a day later, she released a next single "I'm Fine". Two remaining singles, "When I'm Older" and "Me Without You", were released on April 21 and May 5, respectively. The latter was released along with its music video directed by Jason Lester.

Ashe announced the accompanying tour on May 7, titled The Fault Line Tour; it began on April 4, 2022, in Vancouver and concluded on May 11 in Denver. The Brook & The Bluff was the tour's supporting act. Upon release, Ashlyn debuted at number 194 on the US Billboard 200, making it her second entry on the chart. It also peaked at number two on the US Heatseekers Albums chart, reaching numbers 31 and 18 on the US Independent Albums and Top Alternative Albums chart, respectively.

== Critical reception ==
Professional ratings
Review scores
Source	Rating
AllMusic	3.5/5 stars
Riff Magazine	5/10

Marcy Donelson of AllMusic noted influences from artists such as Elton John, Queen, and ABBA throughout Ashlyn, particularly in its melodies and harmonies. She also highlighted Clampitt's production, which she felt contributed to the album's 1970s pop influences, and described the record as balancing contemporary pop with a more timeless sensibility. Writing for Riff magazine, Sara London highlighted Ashe's lyrical detail on tracks such as "Moral of the Story" and "I'm Not Mad Anymore". She praised songs from the latter half of the album including "Kansas", "Serial Monogamist", "Taylor", and "Ryne's Song", the latter of which she described as a thoughtful tribute. London commented on Ashe's vocal performance on "Always", stating: "Her soft voice fits well with the devastating subject and her lyrics delicately capture a portrait of mortality." Variety's Jem Aswad characterized Ashlyn as an eccentric and musically ambitious debut, noting its shifting arrangements and "educated musicality". He also commented on Ashe's songwriting throughout the album's songs about love and heartbreak.

== Track listing ==
Ashlyn track listing
No.	Title	Writer(s)	Producer(s)	Length
1.	"Till Forever Falls Apart" (with Finneas)	Ashlyn Willson; Finneas O'Connell; Leroy Clampitt	Clampitt; Finneas	3:43
2.	"I'm Fine"	Willson; Noah Conrad	Clampitt; Conrad	2:16
3.	"Love Is Not Enough"	Willson; Taylor Dawes; Clampitt; Sean Douglas	Clampitt	3:09
4.	"When I'm Older"	Willson; Clampitt; Douglas	Clampitt	2:50
5.	"Me Without You"	Willson; Clampitt; Casey Smith	Clampitt	3:09
6.	"Save Myself"	Willson; Jason Evigan; Michael Pollack; Smith	Evigan; Pollack; Clampitt	3:44
7.	"Taylor"	Willson; Adam Melchor; Clampitt	Clampitt	2:48
8.	"Not Mad Anymore"	Willson; Douglas; Clampitt	Clampitt	3:43
9.	"Always"	Willson; Clampitt	Clampitt	3:35
10.	"Moral of the Story"	Willson; Smith; Conrad; O'Connell	Conrad; Finneas	3:21
11.	"Serial Monogamist"	Willson; Jenna Andrews; Clampitt	Clampitt	3:08
12.	"Ryne's Song"	Willson; Clampitt	Clampitt	4:01
13.	"Kansas"	Willson; Clampitt; Tobias Jesso Jr.	Clampitt	4:17
14.	"Moral of the Story" (featuring Niall Horan)	Willson; Smith; Niall Horan; Conrad; O'Connell	Conrad; Finneas	3:19
Total length:				47:03

== Personnel ==
Credits were adapted from the liner notes and Tidal.

=== Musicians ===
- Ashe – vocals (all tracks), piano (tracks 4, 5, 9)
- Leroy Clampitt – programming (1–5, 7–9, 11–13), string arrangement (1–5, 8, 9, 12), lap steel (1–3, 8), percussion (1, 3–5, 13), bass guitar (1, 3, 5, 8, 9, 11–13), Mellotron (1, 3, 8, 11, 13), guitar (1); additional bass guitar, additional drums (2); drums (3, 4, 8, 11, 13), backing vocals (3, 4), electric guitar (3, 8), harpsichord (4, 5, 8, 11, 13), 12-string guitar (5, 9, 13), upright bass (5), steel guitar (7), piano (8, 11–13), acoustic guitar (12, 13), Wurlitzer (13)
- Kinga Bacik – cello (1–3, 5, 8, 9, 12)
- Alida Garpestad Peck – backing vocals (1, 5)
- Ben Barter – drums (1, 12)
- Finneas – guitar, piano, synthesizer (1, 14)
- Noah Conrad – bass guitar, drums, guitar, piano, synthesizer (2)
- Taylor Dawes – acoustic guitar, backing vocals (3)
- Sean Douglas – backing vocals (3)
- Thomas Botting – upright bass (4)
- Adam Melchor – steel guitar (7)
- John Anderson – guitar (11)
- Niall Horan – vocals (14)

=== Technical ===
- Manny Marroquin – mixing (1–9, 11, 12)
- Justin Hergett – mixing (10, 14)
- John Greenham – engineering (1, 10, 14)
- Emerson Mancini – engineering (2–9, 11, 12)
- Lionel Crasta – engineering (6)
- Come2Brazil – engineering (6)

== Charts ==
Chart performance
Chart (2021)	Peak position
Lithuanian Albums (AGATA)	95
US Billboard 200	194
US Heatseekers Albums (Billboard)	2
US Independent Albums (Billboard)	31
US Top Alternative Albums (Billboard)	18
