= Suki Waterhouse =

English actress, singer, and model (born 1992)

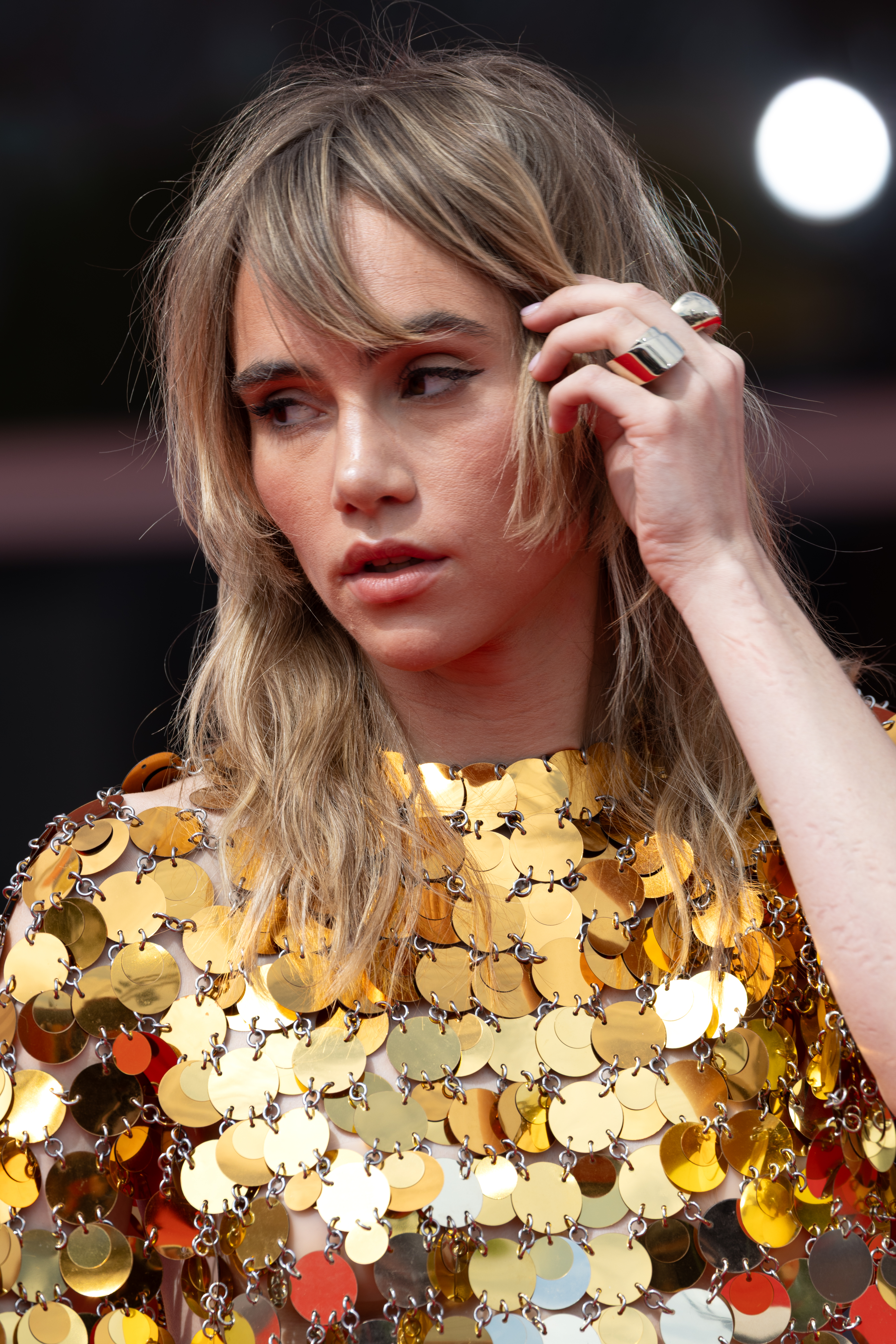
- Waterhouse in 2025
- Born: Alice Suki Waterhouse; 5 January 1992 (age 34); Hammersmith, London, England
- Occupations: Singer; actress; model
- Years active: 2010–present
- Partner(s): Robert Pattinson (2018–present; engaged)
- Children: 1
- Relatives: Imogen Waterhouse (sister)
- Modelling information
- Height: 1.73 m (5 ft 8 in)
- Hair colour: Blonde
- Eye colour: Brown
- Agency: Creative Artists Agency (Los Angeles)
- Musical career
- Genres: Indie pop; indie rock; dream pop; alternative pop
- Instruments: Vocals; guitar; keyboard; piano
- Labels: Island; Sub Pop

Alice Suki Waterhouse (born 5 January 1992) is an English model, actress, and singer. Waterhouse began a career in modelling at the age of 16, and she went on to model for several major fashion labels such as Burberry, Tommy Hilfiger, Hugo Boss, Laura Mercier, and Ferragamo. Her first feature film as an actress was a minor role in Pusher (2012), and she has since appeared in films such as Love, Rosie (2014), The Divergent Series: Insurgent (2015), The Bad Batch (2016), Pride and Prejudice and Zombies (2016), Assassination Nation (2018), and Detective Pikachu (2019). Waterhouse portrayed Karen Sirko in the musical drama miniseries Daisy Jones & the Six (2023).

Outside fashion and acting, she began performing as an indie pop artist and released her debut studio album I Can't Let Go in 2022. Her second album, Memoir of a Sparklemuffin, was released in 2024. Loveland, her third album was released in 2026.

== Early life ==
Alice Suki Waterhouse was born in Hammersmith, London, and was raised in Chiswick, London, the daughter of Elizabeth (née Bruce), a cancer care nurse, and Norman Waterhouse, a plastic surgeon. She has a brother named Charlie, and two younger sisters: Madeleine, who is a model, and Imogen, a model and actress.

== Career ==
=== Modelling ===
Waterhouse began her modelling career after being discovered in "either a Topshop or H&M" in London when she was 16. When she was 19, she became a lingerie model for Marks & Spencer. She worked for RS McColl and Redken. Waterhouse has also modelled for Tommy Hilfiger, Swatch, Lucy in Disguise, H&M, Alice + Olivia, Sass & bide and Pepe Jeans.

Waterhouse has appeared on the covers of British, Korean, Thai, and Turkish Vogue, Tatler, British and Korean Elle, Lucky, L'Officiel, American Marie Claire, French Grazia and 1883 Magazine. Waterhouse has also shot editorials for American, Chinese, Russian and Japanese Vogue, Love, American Elle, Velour, and Stylist Magazine among others. Waterhouse has also walked the runway for brands including Burberry, Alexander Wang and Balenciaga and is a regular on the front row at fashion week.

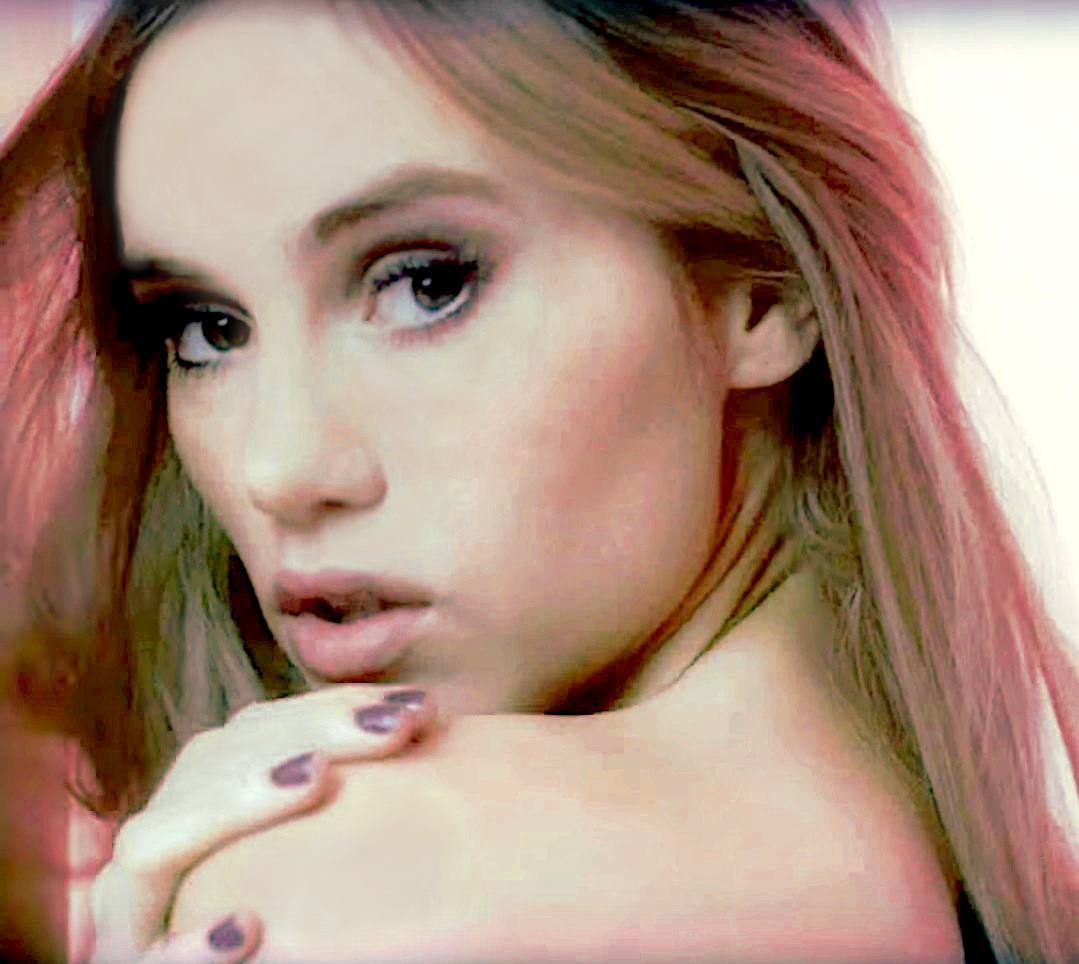
Suki Waterhouse for day 10 of LOVE Advent 2014

In April 2017, Waterhouse was chosen as the "Mercier Muse" for the make-up brand Laura Mercier. In February 2014, she posed completely nude for Dominic Jones Jewellery's autumn/winter campaign at London Fashion Week. In August 2023, Hugo Boss launched its new collection, featuring Waterhouse alongside other celebrities in its campaign.

=== Acting ===
In 2014, Waterhouse played Bethany Williams in the romantic comedy Love, Rosie. She also played Marlene in the Divergent sequel The Divergent Series: Insurgent (2015), based on the book of the same name. Waterhouse played Arlen in Ana Lily Amirpour's romance thriller film The Bad Batch (2016). In June 2016, it was announced that Waterhouse would play Cecily of York in the Starz miniseries adaptation of the novel The White Princess by Philippa Gregory. In September 2016, it was announced that Waterhouse would star opposite Ansel Elgort in the film Jonathan. She has also played "The Girl" in the 2017 drama film The Girl Who Invented Kissing, written and directed by Tom Sierchio, and Quintana in Billionaire Boys Club (2018).

In 2023, Waterhouse portrayed keyboardist Karen Sirko in the Amazon Prime series Daisy Jones & the Six. While the character in the novel of the same name is American, showrunner Scott Neustadter made the character British to "hammer home Karen's commitment to music and living a life dedicated to being in a great rock band."

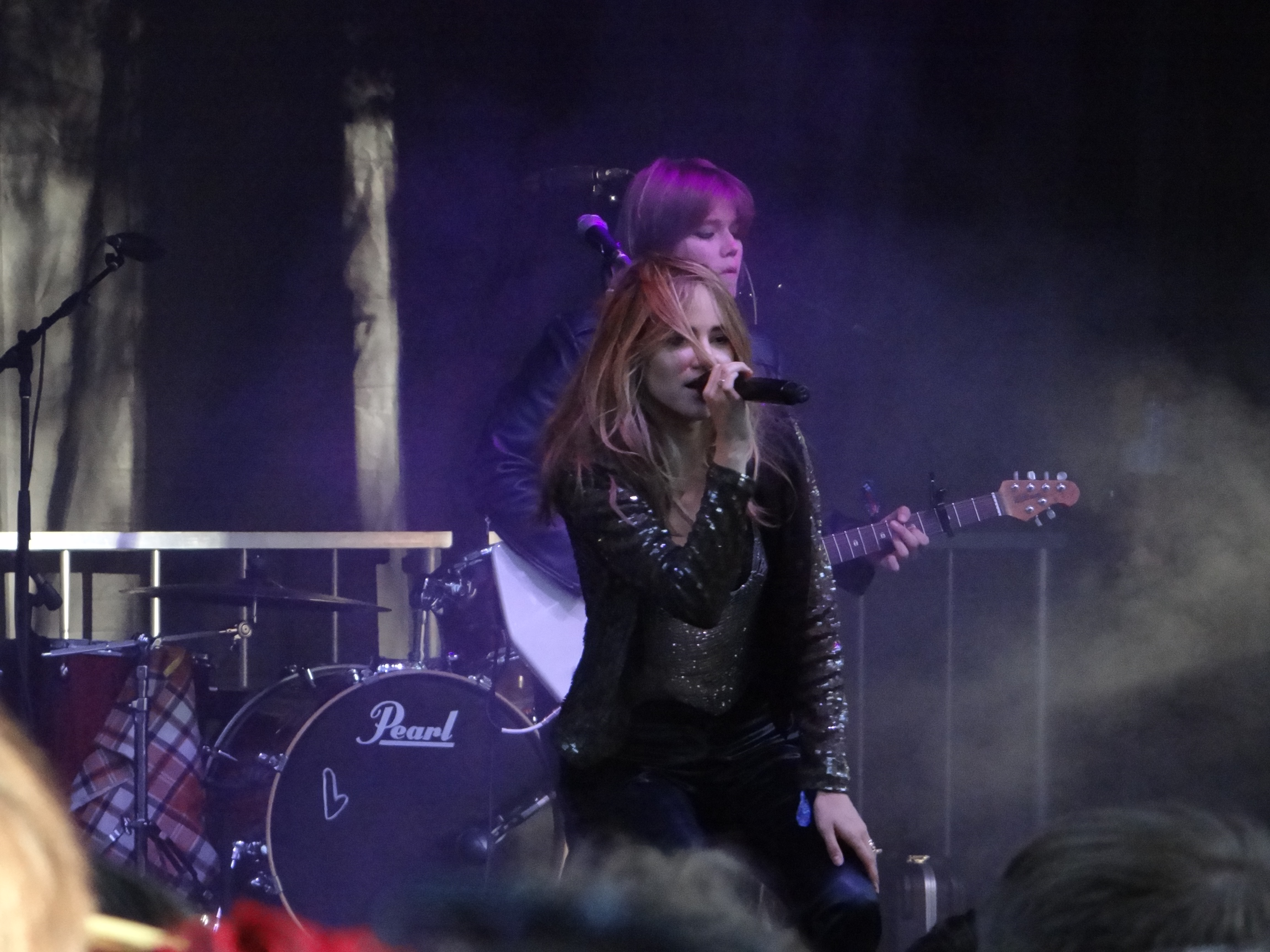
Waterhouse performing at the Shaky Knees Music Festival in 2021

=== Music ===
Waterhouse released her debut single, "Brutally", in November 2016. She released several more singles between 2017 and 2019, including "Good Looking", which later became a viral hit in 2022, and "Johanna". Most of these singles were later included on the November 2022 compilation extended play, Milk Teeth. In May 2022, Waterhouse released her debut studio album, I Can't Let Go, to positive reviews.

In August 2024, Waterhouse performed as an opening act for Taylor Swift's The Eras Tour at Wembley Stadium. The following month, she released her second studio album, Memoir of a Sparklemuffin. Her tour for this album commenced on 28 September 2024 and ended on 21 December 2024. She released the deluxe edition of the album on 13 June 2025, preceded by the singles "Dream Woman" and "On This Love".

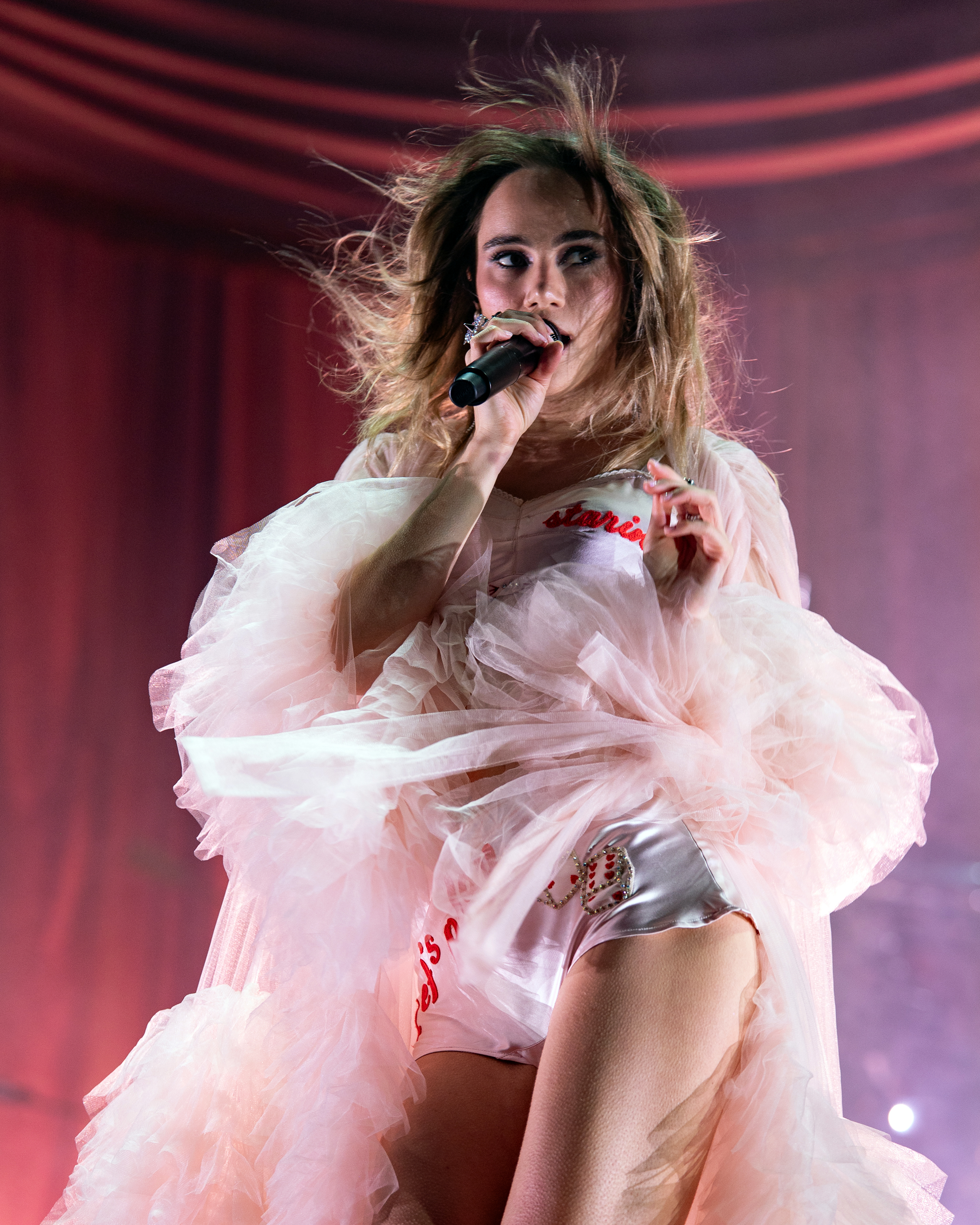
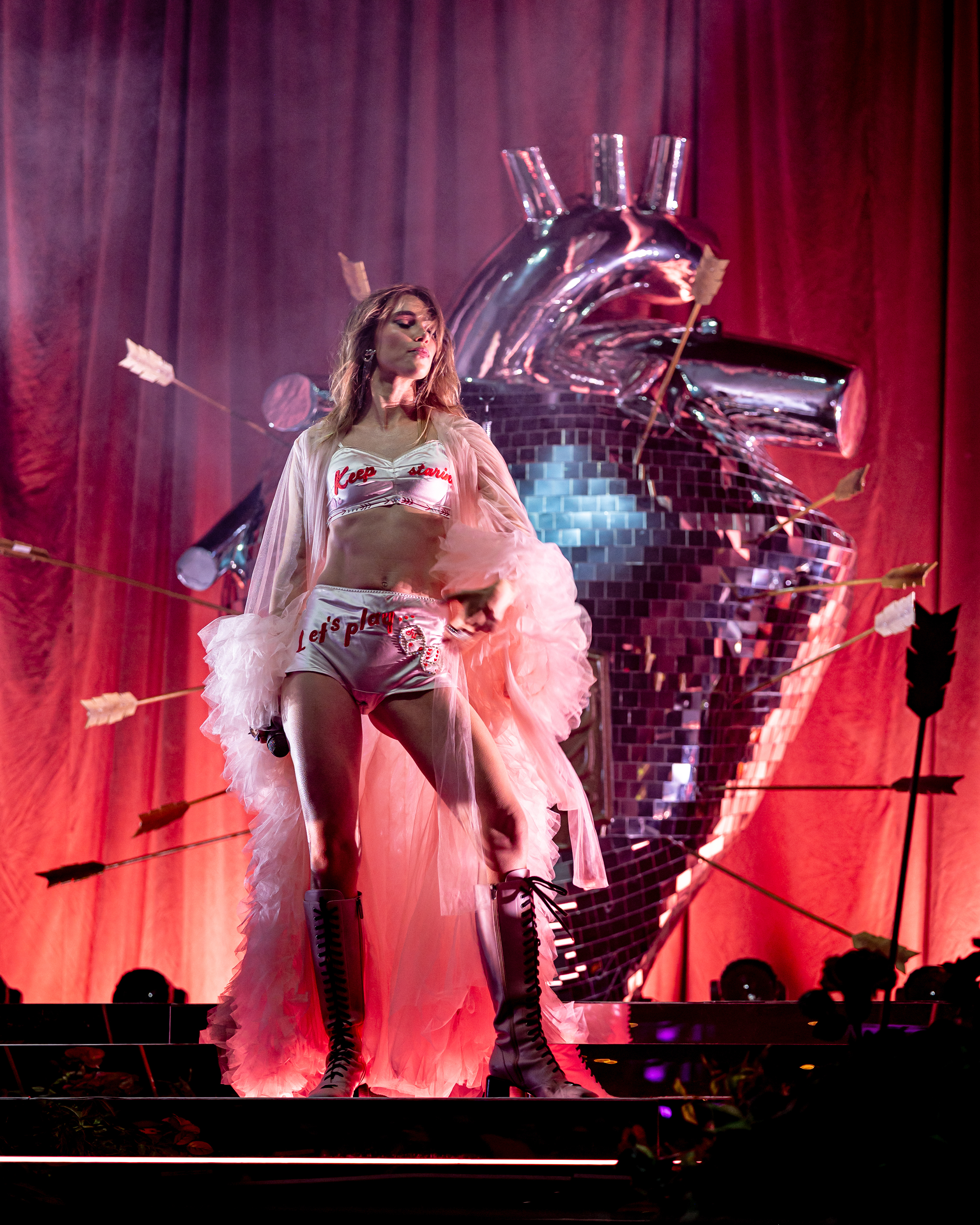
Waterhouse performing in 2026

In August 2025, Waterhouse signed with Island Records. Later that month, she began performing as the opening act for the North American leg of Laufey's A Matter of Time Tour. In April 2026, she announced her third studio album, Loveland, which was released on 10 July 2026. The album includes the singles "Back In Love" and "Tiny Raisin". A North American tour of the same name was announced in support of the album, which will take place from July to October 2026.

== Other ventures ==
=== Photography ===
Waterhouse has shown her photography work at the Eb and Flow gallery in London along with Reggie Yates and Imogen Morris Clarke in an exhibition presented by Next Model Management called 'I'll Be Your Mirror'.

=== Pop & Suki ===
In September 2016, Waterhouse announced the launch of Pop & Suki, an accessories brand that she co-founded with her best friend Poppy Jamie and CEO Leo Seigal. Pop & Suki has since been featured in Vogue, Harper's Bazaar, W and Elle. Celebrities who have worn the brand include Jessica Alba, Lady Gaga, Cara Delevingne, Emily Ratajkowski, Lena Dunham and Taylor Hill. The brand's Camera Bag was referred to by Who What Wear as "The Bag Every It Girl Owns". The brand designed suitcases for Away.

== Personal life ==
Waterhouse dated musician Luke Pritchard in 2011; musician Miles Kane from 2012 until 2013; actor Bradley Cooper from 2013 until 2015; and actor Diego Luna from 2015 until 2017.

Since 2018, Waterhouse has been in a relationship with English actor Robert Pattinson. They are engaged and had their first child, a daughter, in March 2024. The family lives in Los Angeles.

== Filmography ==
=== Film ===
Year	Title	Role	Notes	Ref.
2012	Rachael	Rachael	Short film	
2012	Pusher	Mandy		
2014	Love, Rosie	Bethany Williams		
2015	Insurgent	Marlene		
2016	Pride and Prejudice and Zombies	Kitty Bennet		
2016	Absolutely Fabulous: The Movie	Herself	Cameo role	
2016	The Bad Batch	Arlen		
2017	Sound of Sun	Woman	Short film	
2017	The Girl Who Invented Kissing	The Girl		
2018	Assassination Nation	Sarah		
2018	Jonathan	Elena		
2018	Future World	Ash		
2018	Billionaire Boys Club	Quintana "Q" Bisset		
2018	Charlie Says	Mary Brunner		
2019	Carte Blanche	Lulu	Short film	
2019	Detective Pikachu	Ms. Norman		
2019	Bittersweet Symphony	Iris Evans		
2019	Killers Anonymous	Violet		
2019	A Rainy Day in New York	Tiffany		
2019	Burn	Sheila		
2020	Misbehaviour	Sandra Wolsfeld		
2020	The Broken Hearts Gallery	Chloe		
2021	Creation Stories	Gemma		
2021	Seance	Camille Meadows		
2022	Dalíland	Ginesta / Lucy		
2025	All the Devils Are Here	C		

=== Television ===
Year	Title	Role	Notes	Ref.
2010	Material Girl	Lourdes	Episode: "Episode 4"	
2017	The White Princess	Cecily of York	Miniseries; 5 episodes	
2018	Into the Dark	Alexis	Episode: "New Year, New You"	
2023	Daisy Jones & the Six	Karen Sirko	Miniseries; 10 episodes	

=== Music video appearances ===
Year	Song	Artist	Director	Ref.
2014	"Imagine" (UNICEF: World version)	Various	Michael Jurkovac	
2019	"Nightmare"	Halsey	Hannah Lux Davis	
2019	"Permanent High School"	The Voidz	Hala Matar	

== Discography ==
Studio albums

- I Can't Let Go (2022)
- Memoir of a Sparklemuffin (2024)
- Loveland (2026)
