= Moral of the Story (song) =

2019 single by Ashe

Single by Ashe

from the EP Moral of the Story: Chapter 1 and the album Ashlyn
- Released: February 14, 2019
- Recorded: 2018
- Length: 3:21
- Label: Mom + Pop
- Songwriters: Ashlyn Willson; Casey Smith; Noah Conrad
- Producers: Noah Conrad; Finneas O'Connell

Ashe singles chronology
| "Choirs" (2018) | "Moral of the Story" (2019) | "Bachelorette" (2019) |

Music video
- "Moral of the Story" on YouTube

"Moral of the Story" is a song by American singer-songwriter Ashe, featured on her second EP Moral of the Story: Chapter 1 (2019) and her debut studio album Ashlyn (2021). The song gained popularity after it was featured in the Netflix teen rom-com film To All the Boys: P.S. I Still Love You (2020). The song is co-written and co-produced by American producer Noah Conrad and Finneas O'Connell. The song reached number 71 on the Billboard Hot 100, becoming Ashe's first Hot 100 entry among many other countries including United Kingdom, Ireland, France, Canada, Netherlands and New Zealand.

== Background and commercial performance ==
"Moral of the Story" was originally released on Valentine's Day 2019 ahead of the release of Ashe's second EP, Moral of the Story: Chapter 1 (2019). The song was co-written and co-produced by five-time Grammy-winner Finneas O'Connell, and also features an uncredited lyrical contribution from his sister, Billie Eilish. The song made its world radio airplay premiere on KYSR on 21 February 2020. The song also became popular on the video-sharing platform TikTok, where it has been used in over 900 thousand videos as of June 2020.

By the time the song had debuted at number 71 on the Billboard Hot 100, it had gained 9.7 million US streams and 4 thousand downloads. As a result of the song's success, Ashe debuted at number six on the Billboard Emerging Artists chart.

== Composition and lyrics ==
"Moral of the Story" is in 4/4 common time, in the key of B-flat major, with a moderate tempo of 120 beats per minute. Ashe's vocal range spans from the low note F3 to the high note of G5, giving the song two octaves and one note of range.

In 2018, Ashe wrote "Moral of the Story" after filing for divorce, in an attempt to try and make sense of why the relationship failed. She told Earmilk:

It's hard to accept when you've made a mistake in love or life. But realizing all those mistakes have made you who you are and have helped shape the life you're in you puts a different light on things.

== Critical reception ==
"Moral of the Story" was described by Gregory Castel of Earmilk as a "sobering love ballad with attention-grabbing lyrics" which Ashe has written with "captivating satire and vulnerability".

== Music video ==
The song's music video, which has gained over 36 million views on YouTube, was released with the single and was noted to have a Walter Wick-inspired aesthetic.

== Charts ==
=== Weekly charts ===
| Chart (2019–2020) | Peak position |
|---|---|
| Australia (ARIA) | 44 |
| Austria (Ö3 Austria Top 40) | 29 |
| Belgium (Ultratip Bubbling Under Flanders) | 4 |
| Belgium (Ultratip Bubbling Under Wallonia) | 5 |
| Canada Hot 100 (Billboard) | 42 |
| Czech Republic Singles Digital (ČNS IFPI) | 17 |
| Estonia (Eesti Ekspress) | 19 |
| France (SNEP) | 71 |
| Greece (IFPI) | 44 |
| Hungary (Stream Top 40) | 12 |
| Ireland (IRMA) | 17 |
| Lithuania (AGATA) | 21 |
| Mexico Ingles Airplay (Billboard) | 15 |
| Netherlands (Dutch Tipparade) | 15 |
| Netherlands (Single Top 100) | 74 |
| New Zealand Hot Singles (RMNZ) | 5 |
| Norway (VG-lista) | 35 |
| Poland Airplay (ZPAV) | 19 |
| Scottish Singles Sales (Official Charts) | 63 |
| Slovakia Singles Digital (ČNS IFPI) | 34 |
| Sweden Heatseeker (Sverigetopplistan) | 4 |
| Switzerland (Schweizer Hitparade) | 30 |
| UK Singles (Official Charts) | 31 |
| UK Indie (Official Charts) | 2 |
| US Billboard Hot 100 | 71 |
| US Adult Pop Airplay (Billboard) | 18 |
| US Pop Airplay (Billboard) | 23 |
| US Hot Rock & Alternative Songs (Billboard) | 7 |
| US Rock & Alternative Airplay (Billboard) | 9 |
| US Rolling Stone Top 100 | 42 |

=== Year-end charts ===
| Chart (2020) | Position |
|---|---|
| US Hot Rock & Alternative Songs (Billboard) | 14 |

== Certifications ==
Certifications for "Moral of the Story"
| Region | Certification | Certified units/sales |
|---|---|---|
| France (SNEP) | Gold | 100,000^{‡} |
| Italy (FIMI) | Gold | 50,000^{‡} |
| New Zealand (RMNZ) | 2× Platinum | 60,000^{‡} |
| Spain (Promusicae) | Gold | 30,000^{‡} |
| United Kingdom (BPI) | Platinum | 600,000^{‡} |
| United States (RIAA) | Gold | 500,000^{‡} |
^{‡} Sales+streaming figures based on certification alone.

== Niall Horan version ==
"Moral of the Story"

Single by Ashe featuring Niall Horan

from the album Ashlyn
- Released: June 17, 2020
- Recorded: 2020
- Length: 3:18
- Label: Mom + Pop
- Songwriters: Ashlyn Rae Willson; Niall Horan; Casey Smith; Noah Conrad; Finneas O'Connell
- Producers: Noah Conrad; Finneas O'Connell

Niall Horan singles chronology
| "Black and White" (2020) | "Moral of the Story" (2020) | "Our Song" (2021) |

A version of the song featuring vocals from Irish singer-songwriter Niall Horan was released on June 17, 2020. It was included on Ashe's debut studio album Ashlyn (2021).

=== Charts ===
| Chart (2020) | Peak position |
|---|---|
| New Zealand Hot Singles (RMNZ) | 19 |
