= 1996 in American television =

In American television in 1996, notable events included television show debuts, finales, cancellations, and channel initiations, closures and rebrandings, as well as information about controversies and disputes.

== Notable events ==
=== January ===
Date	Event
20	Fox introduces its FoxTrax "glowing puck" during its telecast of the 46th National Hockey League All-Star Game.
28	Chris Isaak and Brooke Shields make guest appearances on a post-Super Bowl episode of Friends on NBC.

=== February ===
Date	Event
8–9	Peter Argyropolous and Deborah Cohen win a combined total of $146,529 cash prizes from two episodes (including the $10,000 wedge played with the Double Play token and two Ford Mustangs), making the couple the biggest winner in the history of Wheel of Fortune; They remain the biggest winners for a team, and will hold the record until Michelle Lowenstein wins $1,026,080 on October 14, 2008.
17	Fred Rogers makes a guest appearance on the CBS Western drama Dr. Quinn, Medicine Woman. This is notably, the only time that Rogers portrayed a fictional character on television.
28	Paxson Communications completes their $40 million purchase of ABC affiliate WAKC-TV in Akron, Ohio, from ValueVision. Hours after the sale closed, Paxson president Dean Goodman arrives at WAKC-TV's studios and tells the staff, "news ceases at this moment", firing the entire news department and all station management. This makes Akron (a part of the larger Cleveland–Akron–Canton television market) the largest city in the United States without a commercial television newscast.
29	ABC affiliate KBAK-TV and CBS affiliate KERO-TV swap affiliations in Bakersfield.

=== March ===
Date	Event
4	DISH Network, a Direct Broadcast Satellite service, begins as a service of EchoStar.
8	The Joy of Painting host Bob Ross makes his final television appearance as a guest in the pilot episode of the children's series The Adventures of Elmer & Friends. Premiering over a year after his death, the episode includes a final message of thanks from Ross to his fans and viewers and a musical tribute.
31	WrestleMania XII from the Arrowhead Pond of Anaheim in Anaheim, California is broadcast on pay-per-view. In the main event, Shawn Michaels defeats Bret Hart in a 60-minute Iron Man match to win the WWF Championship for the first time.

=== April ===
Date	Event
6	The first ever Major League Soccer game is broadcast live on ESPN. The San Jose Clash hosted D.C. United at Spartan Stadium with San Jose winning on a goal by Eric Wynalda.

=== May ===
Date	Event
11	The 1996 Kids' Choice Awards air on Nickelodeon, hosted by Whitney Houston and Rosie O'Donnell. Television winners included Home Improvement (for "Favorite TV Show"), Tim Allen (of Home Improvement for "Favorite TV Actor"), Tia and Tamera Mowry (of Sister, Sister for "Favorite TV Actress") and Rugrats (for "Favorite Cartoon").
14	Fox airs a television film that serves as the first attempt to revive Doctor Who following its suspension in 1989. It was intended as a backdoor pilot for a new American-produced Doctor Who TV series. It introduced Paul McGann as the Eighth Doctor in his only televised appearance as the character until "The Night of the Doctor" in 2013. Although a ratings success in the United Kingdom, the film did not fare well on American television and no series was commissioned. The series was later relaunched on the BBC in 2005.
16	More than 12 million Americans watch the final episode of Murder, She Wrote on CBS, "Death By Demographics". Through its 12-year run, the series had become the longest-running American murder mystery drama.
18	Mystery Science Theater 3000 airs its final episode on Comedy Central. The final film to be featured is 1978's Laserblast. The series will eventually move to The Sci-Fi Channel, where it would run for three more seasons.
20	The Fresh Prince of Bel-Air concludes its original run after nearly six years.

=== June ===
Date	Event
1	Major League Baseball broadcasts debut on Fox.
3	Zenith introduces the first HDTV-compatible front projection TV in the U.S.
3	CBS affiliate WCPO-TV and ABC affiliate WKRC-TV, both in Cincinnati, Ohio, switch network affiliations.
19	CBS affiliate WRAL-TV in Raleigh, North Carolina is awarded the first experimental high-definition television license in the United States.
23	At the World Wrestling Federation's pay-per-view event King of the Ring, wrestler Stone Cold Steve Austin wins the King of the Ring tournament by defeating Jake Roberts. After the match, Austin makes a certain victory speech in what would famously become as the "Austin 3:16" catchphrase.
30	New York PBS member station WNYC-TV, owned by the city of New York, signs off for the final time; sold to a joint venture between Dow Jones & Co. and ITT Corp., it relaunches as commercial sports-oriented independent station WBIS-TV (while operating as a non-commercial educational station, WNYC-TV had been licensed with a commercial classification).

=== July ===
Date	Event
6	When it becomes evident that Donna Love (played by Anna Stuart) will be next to die in a serial killer storyline on the NBC soap opera Another World, many fans start letter-writing campaigns to save the character; the NBC studios in New York City also report a great number of switchboard telephone calls regarding Stuart's imminent departure. Executive producer Jill Farren Phelps decides that Frankie Frame (Alice Barrett) will be killed off the show instead.
6	New World Communications sells NBC affiliates KNSD-TV in San Diego, California, and WVTM-TV in Birmingham, Alabama, their lone remaining stations that didn't switch to Fox, to NBC's owned-and-operated division.
7	At the WCW produced pay-per-view event Bash at the Beach, Hulk Hogan turns heel for the first time in 15 years and announces the formation of the New World Order with Kevin Nash and Scott Hall.
17	News Corporation (the owners of 20th Century Fox and the FOX Television Network) announced that it would acquire New World in an all-stock transaction worth $2.48 billion. The purchase by News Corporation was finalized in early 1997, folding New World's ten Fox affiliates into the former's Fox Television Stations subsidiary and making all twelve stations affected by the 1994 agreement owned-and-operated stations of the network.

=== August ===
Date	Event
19	NBC affiliate in Charleston, WCIV, and ABC affiliate WCBD-TV swap network affiliations.

=== September ===
Date	Event
7	Paula Zahn is named a Saturday anchor of CBS Evening News.
7	Fox Kids airs for the final time on St. Louis affiliate KNLC, which is dropped due to KNLC owner Larry Rice's decision on putting ministry messages instead of ads. KTVI picks up the program block the following Monday.
8	The 48th Primetime Emmy Awards are presented on ABC.
8	WBRC-TV in Birmingham, Alabama, becomes a Fox-owned station, a year after Fox had acquired it and WGHP-TV in High Point, North Carolina. This ended WBRC-TV's 47 year affiliation with ABC; in turn, ABC links up with low-power station WBMA-LP (supplemented with two full-power satellites, WCFT-TV in Tuscaloosa and WJSU-TV in Anniston). Former Fox affiliate WTTO-TV becomes an independent before affiliating with The WB the next year, while former WTTO-TV satellite WNAL in Gadsden switches to CBS.
13	The pilot episode for Everybody Loves Raymond is broadcast on CBS.
15	USA Network ends its USA Cartoon Express block, expanding its newer USA Action Extreme Team block to weekdays.
16	Wheel of Fortune introduced a gameplay round called Jackpot which contestants can win an accumulated pot based on the value spun throughout the round. The round would remain intact until 2013.
17	The O. J. Simpson civil trial begins.
30	A revival of the game show Shop 'til You Drop premieres on the Family Channel along with a new game show called Shopping Spree. Both shows would last on the channel until August 14th 1998, the final day of the Family Channel branding. Shop would get revived in 2000 on PAX.

=== October ===
Date	Event
2	Seven newscasters were dismissed by WCBS-TV (channel 2) in New York.
6	President Bill Clinton and Senator Bob Dole participate in the first 1996 presidential debate with Jim Lehrer of PBS moderating.
7	Nickelodeon adds an extra half-hour of programming, branded as "More Nickelodeon", on weekdays at 8:00pm Eastern/7:00pm Central. The "More Nickelodeon" block included new episodes of The Secret World of Alex Mack plus new series Hey Arnold!, KaBlam!, and The Wubbulous World of Dr. Seuss. For the next two weeks, viewers were encouraged to "Spot the Dot" using game pieces found at Blockbuster Video stores and in Nintendo Power magazine for a chance to win a Nintendo 64.
9	Vice President Al Gore and former HUD Secretary Jack Kemp participate in the 1996 vice presidential debate at Mahaffey Theater.
10	Turner Broadcasting System merged into Time Warner.
10	Greg Kinnear hosts his final episode of NBC's Later. The show would then revolve a set of rotating guest hosts for the next three years.
16	Clinton and Dole participate in the final presidential debate at the University of San Diego.
20–26	Fox broadcasts its first ever World Series. The New York Yankees won their 23rd title (and first since 1978) against the Atlanta Braves in only six games.
30	WBKP in Calumet, Michigan signs on the air, giving the Upper Peninsula both its first full-time ABC affiliate (WLUC-TV had dropped its primary ABC affiliation the previous year in favor of its secondary NBC affiliation) and full-time affiliates of the "Big Three" networks.

=== November ===
Date	Event
2	The final episode of the original Teenage Mutant Ninja Turtles series, "Divide and Conquer" airs on CBS.
4	In tribute to the 30th anniversary of Star Trek: The Original Series, an episode of Star Trek: Deep Space Nine features Captain Benjamin Sisko and the crew travel back in time to prevent the assassination of Captain James T. Kirk of the USS Enterprise by a Klingon using a booby-trapped tribble. Its sister series Voyager produced a similar episode, "Flashback".
4	The infamous "Pillman's got a gun" angle with Brian Pillman and his former tag-team partner Stone Cold Steve Austin airs on USA Network's Monday Night RAW.
23	Bob Hope's final television special, Bob Hope... Laughing with the Presidents, airs on NBC.

=== December ===
Date	Event
1	The long-running 25 Days of Christmas event begins on The Family Channel.
8	Paramount Television and Viacom purchased a 50% stake in UPN from Chris-Craft and United Television for approximately $160 million. It made UPN a joint partnership between Chris-Craft and Viacom (and later a Viacom property as a whole) at this point.
17	6 years after dropping the title, TBS resumes using the term Superstation.
31	ABC affiliate WAKC-TV in Akron, Ohio, disaffiliates from the network after 43 years and drops all remaining entertainment programming to carry Paxson Communications' inTV infomercial network. The station's studios had previously relocated from Akron to the Cleveland suburb of Warrensville Heights.

== Television programs ==
=== Debuts ===
Date	Show	Network
January 3	Matt Waters	CBS
January 6	Campus Cops	USA Network
January 9	3rd Rock from the Sun	NBC
January 9	Champs	ABC
January 20	The Lazarus Man	TNT
January 21	Savannah	The WB
January 22	Bzzz!	Syndication
January 23	Moesha	UPN
January 24	Tracey Takes On...	HBO
January 31	The Louie Show	CBS
January 31	Remember WENN	AMC
February 1	World's Funniest Videos	ABC
February 3	C Bear and Jamal	Fox Kids
February 5	Second Noah	ABC
February 6	Street Signs	CNBC
February 20	VH1 Storytellers	VH1
February 24	The Spooktacular New Adventures of Casper	Fox Kids
March 1	Gold Fever	Outdoor Channel
March 2	Pacific Blue	USA Network
March 2	Space Cases	Nickelodeon
March 4	Power Lunch	CNBC
March 4	Good Company	CBS
March 4	High Incident	ABC
March 5	Buddies	ABC
March 8	Muppets Tonight	ABC
March 9	Malibu Shores	NBC
March 12	The Paranormal Borderline	UPN
March 13	The Faculty	ABC
March 13	Swift Justice	UPN
March 15	Aliens in the Family	ABC
March 16	The Mystery Files of Shelby Woo	Nickelodeon
March 17	Local Heroes	Fox
March 17	The Show	Fox
March 20	The Sentinel	UPN
March 21	Boston Common	NBC
March 29	E! True Hollywood Story	E!
March 29	Nash Bridges	CBS
April 1	Home and Family	The Family Channel
April 3	My Guys	CBS
April 8	Profit	Fox
April 20	Power Rangers Zeo	Fox Kids
April 21	Poltergeist: The Legacy	Showtime
April 23	Forensic Files	TLC
April 27	Dexter's Laboratory	TNT
April 28	Fox News Sunday	Fox
May 13	Buzzkill	MTV
June 1	The American Athlete	ABC
June 2	Big Bag	Cartoon Network
June 3	Debt	Lifetime
June 3	Kratts' Creatures	PBS
June 3	The Last Frontier	Fox
June 3	L.A. Firefighters	Fox
June 10	Caryl & Marilyn: Real Friends	ABC
June 10	The Rosie O'Donnell Show	Syndication
June 10	A Wedding Story	TLC
July 15	The News with Brian Williams	MSNBC
July 15	The Site	MSNBC
July 15	Time and Again	MSNBC
July 15	MSNBC Live	MSNBC
July 22	The Daily Show	Comedy Central
August 10	Arliss	HBO
August 11	The Big Easy	USA Network
August 12	Fox After Breakfast	Fox
August 17	Kenan & Kel	Nickelodeon
August 25	The Steve Harvey Show	The WB
August 26	7th Heaven	The WB
August 26	The Real Adventures of Jonny Quest	Cartoon Network
August 26	Goode Behavior	UPN
August 26	Malcolm & Eddie	UPN
August 26	Sparks	UPN
August 27	Homeboys in Outer Space	UPN
August 28	The Jamie Foxx Show	The WB
August 28	Nick Freno: Licensed Teacher	The WB
August 31	Women: Stories of Passion	Showtime
September 1	Big Deal	Fox
September 2	Adventures from the Book of Virtues	PBS
September 3	The Burning Zone	UPN
September 3	Quack Pack	Syndication
September 3	Imus in the Morning	MSNBC
September 6	Dragon Flyz	Syndication
September 6	Mighty Ducks: The Animated Series	The Disney Channel and ABC
September 6	Superman: The Animated Series	Kids' WB
September 7	Road Rovers	Kids' WB
September 7	Captain Simian & the Space Monkeys	Syndication
September 7	Big Bad Beetleborgs	Fox Kids
September 8	Blue's Clues	Nickelodeon
September 8	Bureau of Alien Detectors	UPN Kids
September 8	The Incredible Hulk	UPN Kids
September 8	Jumanji	UPN Kids
September 8	Life with Roger	The WB
September 9	Lush Life	Fox
September 9	Party Girl	Fox
September 9	Grill Me	USA Network
September 9	Access Hollywood	Syndication
September 9	The Cape	Syndication
September 9	Samurai Pizza Cats	Syndication
September 9	F/X: The Series	Syndication
September 9	Eagle Riders	Syndication
September 9	In Person with Maureen O'Boyle	Syndication
September 9	Real TV	Syndication
September 9	Scoop with Sam & Dorothy	Syndication
September 13	Everybody Loves Raymond	CBS
September 14	Bailey Kipper's P.O.V.	CBS
September 14	Project G.e.e.K.e.R.	CBS
September 14	Secrets of the Cryptkeeper's Haunted House	CBS
September 16	Beast Wars: Transformers	UPN Kids
September 16	Judge Judy	Syndication
September 16	The Pat Bullard Show	Syndication
September 16	Cosby	CBS
September 16	Pearl	CBS
September 17	Promised Land	CBS
September 17	Something So Right	NBC
September 17	Spin City	ABC
September 18	Townies	ABC
September 18	Men Behaving Badly	NBC
September 19	The Pretender	NBC
September 19	Suddenly Susan	NBC
September 19	Moloney	CBS
September 20	Mr. & Mrs. Smith	CBS
September 20	Clueless	ABC
September 21	All Dogs Go to Heaven: The Series	Syndication
September 21	Dark Skies	NBC
September 21	WWF LiveWire	USA Network
September 21	The Mouse and the Monster	UPN Kids
September 24	Relativity	ABC
September 25	Pulp Comics	Comedy Central
September 27	Sabrina the Teenage Witch	ABC
September 28	Early Edition	CBS
September 28	Common Law	ABC
September 28	Love and Marriage	Fox
September 28	The Adventures of Sinbad	Syndication
September 28	Psi Factor	Syndication
September 28	Mr. Rhodes	NBC
September 29	Profiler	NBC
September 30	Pappyland	TLC
September 30	Shopping Spree	The Family Channel
September 30	Small Talk	The Family Channel
September 30	Wait 'til You Have Kids	The Family Channel
September 30	Dangerous Minds	ABC
October 5	Jungle Cubs	ABC
October 7	Fox News Now	Fox News Channel
October 7	Hannity & Colmes	Fox News Channel
October 7	The O'Reilly Factor	Fox News Channel
October 7	Your World with Neil Cavuto	Fox News Channel
October 7	Arthur	PBS
October 7	Where in Time Is Carmen Sandiego?	PBS
October 7	Mr. Conductor's Thomas Tales	PBS
October 7	Hey Arnold!	Nickelodeon
October 11	KaBlam!	Nickelodeon
October 12	The RuPaul Show	VH1
October 13	The Wubbulous World of Dr. Seuss	Nickelodeon
October 19	Waynehead	Kids' WB
October 21	Ink	CBS
October 25	The Crocodile Hunter	Discovery Channel
October 25	Millennium	Fox
October 25	Remember This?	MSNBC
October 27	Pop-Up Video	VH1
October 27	EZ Streets	CBS
October 30	Public Morals	CBS
October 31	The New Detectives	Discovery Channel
November 3	Inspector Gadget's Field Trip	The History Channel
November 9	The High Life	HBO
December 9	Idiot Savants	MTV
December 24	Edgewise	MSNBC
December 28	For Your Home	PBS
December 28	Gardening by the Yard	HGTV
December 28	Naughty Amateur Home Videos	Playboy TV

=== Returning this year ===
Show	Last aired	Previous network	New title	New network	Returned
Doug	1994	Nickelodeon	Disney's Brand Spanking New! Doug	ABC	September 7
Gargoyles	1996	Syndication	Gargoyles: The Goliath Chronicles	ABC	September 7
The Dating Game	1989	Syndication	Same	Same	September 9
The Newlywed Game	1989	Syndication	Same	Same	September 9
Shop 'til You Drop	1994	Lifetime	The New Shop 'til You Drop	The Family Channel	September 30
What A Cartoon! (World Premiere Toons)	1996	TBS/Cartoon Network	The What A Cartoon! Show	Cartoon Network	October 9

=== Ending this year ===
Date	Show	Debut
January 9	Live Shot	1995
January 11	The Commish	1991
January 14	Nickelodeon Guts	1992
February 3	Are You Afraid of the Dark? (returned in 1999)	1992
February 3	Dumb and Dumber	1995
February 7	Matt Waters	1996
February 17	Maybe This Time	1995
February 21	VR Troopers	1994
February 23	Carnie!	1995
February 23	Strange Luck	1995
February 24	Iron Man	1994
February 26	High Society	1995
March 1	The Head	1994
March 7	The Mickey Mouse Club	1955
March 27	Dream On	1990
March 29	The Pink Panther	1993
March 29	George & Alana	1995
March 30	Campus Cops	1996
April 1	Partners	1995
May 4	Sisters	1991
May 11	Captain Planet and the Planeteers	1990
May 19	Murder, She Wrote	1984
May 20	The Fresh Prince of Bel-Air	1990
May 20	Nowhere Man	1995
June 2	Space: Above and Beyond	1995
June 4	Minor Adjustments	1995
June 9	seaQuest DSV	1993
June 17	Buzzkill	1996
June 19	Hudson Street	1995
June 26	Picket Fences	1992
June 28	Central Park West	1995
July 11	American Gothic	1995
July 14	Muppets Tonight	1996
July 19	Tales from the Crypt	1989
August 8	Kratts' Creatures	1996
August 16	The Client	1995
August 17	Santo Bugito	1995
August 27	Rescue 911	1989
August 30	A Current Affair (returned in 2005)	1986
September 13	The Phil Donahue Show	1967
September 14	WWF Mania	1993
September 15	USA Cartoon Express	1982
September 30	Lush Life	1996
September 30	Party Girl	1996
October 6	Big Deal	1996
October 10	Later with Greg Kinnear	1994
October 20	The Ren & Stimpy Show	1991
October 30	Public Morals	1996
October 30	The John Larroquette Show	1993
November 2	Teenage Mutant Ninja Turtles	1987
November 9	The Lazarus Man	1996
November 10	Kirk	1995
November 11	Mr. Conductor's Thomas Tales	1996
November 20	Masked Rider	1995
November 24	Rocko's Modern Life	1993
November 24	The Tick	1994
November 25	Timon & Pumbaa (returned in 1999)	1995
November 27	Power Rangers Zeo	1996
November 28	Quack Pack	1996
December 4	Townies	1996
December 6	Mr. & Mrs. Smith	1996
December 7	Project G.e.e.K.e.R.	1996
December 8	Allegra's Window	1994
December 13	Earthworm Jim	1995
December 14	Bailey Kipper's P.O.V.	1996
December 14	California Dreams	1992
December 18	The High Life	1996
December 24	Roundhouse	1992
December 28	The Adventures of Pete & Pete	1993
Unknown	Top Rank Boxing (returned in 2017)	1980

=== Made for TV movies ===
Premiere date	Title	Channel
February 11	Night of the Twisters	The Family Channel
April 9	Face of Evil	CBS
May 14	Doctor Who	Fox
June 9	Lily Dale	Showtime
September 24	After Jimmy	CBS
November 15	Dallas: J.R. Returns	CBS
December 15	The Angel of Pennsylvania Avenue	The Family Channel
December 17	Unlikely Angel	CBS

=== Miniseries ===
Premiere date	Title	Channel
February 4	Gulliver's Travels	NBC
February 24	The Late Shift	HBO
April 28-29	The Beast	NBC
November 17	Titanic	CBS

=== Entering syndication this year ===
Show	Seasons	In production	Source
Dr. Quinn, Medicine Woman	4	Yes	
Hangin' with Mr. Cooper	4	Yes	
Mad About You	4	Yes	
Martin	4	Yes	

=== Changes of network affiliation ===
Show	Moved from	Moved to
Brotherly Love	NBC	The WB
In the House	NBC	UPN
Minor Adjustments	NBC	UPN
Candid Camera	Syndication	CBS
Gargoyles	Syndication	ABC
Doug	Nickelodeon	ABC
TekWar	USA Network	Sci-Fi Channel
Major League Baseball Game of the Week	CBS	Fox
The Mask	CBS	CBS/Syndication
Shop 'til You Drop	Lifetime	The Family Channel

== Networks and services ==
=== Launches ===
Network	Type	Launch date	Notes	Source
BET on Jazz	Cable television	January 15		
Sundance Channel	Cable and satellite	February 1		
America's Health Network	Cable and satellite	March		
Starz! 2	Cable and satellite	March		
Ovation	Cable television	April 21		
Nick at Nite's TV Land	Cable and satellite	April 29		
Animal Planet	Cable and satellite	June 1		
M2	Cable and satellite	August 1		
Fox Sports Arizona	Cable and satellite	September 7		
Fox News Channel	Cable and satellite	October 7		
Discovery Civilization Network; Discovery Travel & Living Network; Discovery Kids Channel; Discovery Science Network	Digital cable	October 7		
Research Channel	Cable television	November		
ESPNews	Cable and satellite	November 1		
HBO Family	Cable and satellite	December 1		
CN8, The Comcast Network	Cable television	December 1		
CNN/SI	Cable and satellite	December 12		

=== Conversions and rebrandings ===
Old network name	New network name	Type	Conversion Date	Notes	Source
America's Talking	MSNBC	Cable and satellite	July 15		
Prime Deportiva; Prime Sports Intermountain West; Prime Sports KBL; Prime Sports Midwest; Prime Sports Northwest; Prime Sports Rocky Mountain; Prime Sports Southwest; Prime Sports West	Fox Sports Américas; Fox Sports Utah; Fox Sports Pittsburgh; Fox Sports Midwest; Fox Sports Northwest; Fox Sports Rocky Mountain; Fox Sports Southwest; Fox Sports West	Cable and satellite	November 1	Seven regional sports networks and a companion Spanish-language network operated by Prime Network relaunched as Fox Sports Net.	

=== Closures ===
Network	Type	End date	Notes	Sources
WWOR EMI Service	Cable television	December 31	Advance Entertainment Corporation, which had acquired WWOR EMI Service in mid-1996, discontinued the channel on December 31. WWOR's satellite transponder slot was given to Discovery Communications' Animal Planet channel.	
Intro Television	Cable television	December 31	Intro Television, which showed sample programs from cable networks such as Cartoon Network, Sci-Fi Channel, The History Channel, and The Box, was replaced by Plex: Encore 1 on January 1.	

== Television stations ==
=== Station launches ===
Date	Market	Station	Channel	Affiliation
January	Las Vegas, NV	KZIR	15	Univision
January 1	Reno, NV	KRXI-TV	11	Fox
February 22	Denver, CO	KTVJ	14	Independent
March 1	Louisville, KY	W62BM	62	Independent
March 1	West Milford, NJ	WFME-TV	66	Independent
March 1	Ogden, UT	K21ET	21	Univision
March 16	Oklahoma City, OK	KOPX-TV	62	inTV
March 22	Merced–Fresno, CA	KNSO	51	Religious independent
March 30	Albion, NE	KLKE	24	ABC (satellite of KLKN)
April 14	Ceres–Sacramento, CA	KBSV-TV	23	Independent
April 25	Binghamton, NY	W08DL	8	Independent
May 5	Grand Junction, CO	KKCO	11	NBC
May 26	Key West, FL	WWFD	8	Multicultural independent
May 28	Lima, OH	W18BP	18	Fox (via WOHL-LP)
May 31	Killeen–Waco, TX	KAKW	62	UPN/The WB
June	El Centro, CA–Yuma, AZ	KVYE	7	Univision
June 23	Fayetteville, NC	WUNU	31	PBS (UNC-TV)
July 2	Fairbanks, AK	K22EY	22	Wireless cable
August 7	Fairbanks, AK	K13XD	13	CBS
August 28	Ellensburg, WA	K25FP	25	3ABN
September 1	Hagerstown, MD	WSHE-TV	60	inTV
September 14	Kansas City, MO	KCWB	29	The WB
September 27	Butte, MT	KWYB	18	ABC
October 7	Flint, MI	W61DB	61	Independent
October 7	Kalamazoo, MI	WUHO-LP	38	Independent
October 11	Grand Rapids, MI	WJUE	43	inTV
October 30	Marquette, MI	WBKP	5	ABC
October 31	Bozeman, MT	KCTZ	7	Fox
November 7	Nashville, TN	W59AW	59	America One
December 3	Oklahoma City, OK	News Now 53	53 (cable-only)	Independent (24/7 news)
December 12	Traverse City, MI	W51CS	51	America One
December 21	Arlington–Dallas–Fort Worth, TX	KPXD-TV	68	InTV
December 24	Bluefield, West Virginia	WVSX	59	Fox
Unknown date	Missoula, Montana	KUFM-TV	11	PBS (Montana PBS)

=== Stations changing network affiliation ===
Date	Market	Station	Channel	Prior affiliation	New affiliation
January 1	Honolulu, HI	KHON-TV	2	NBC	Fox
January 1	Honolulu, HI	KHNL	13	Fox	NBC
January 1	Idaho Falls–Pocatello, ID	KPVI	6	ABC	NBC
January 1	Idaho Falls–Pocatello, ID	KIFI-TV	8	NBC	ABC
January 1	Macon, GA	WGXA	24	ABC	Fox
January 1	Macon, GA	WPGA-TV	58	Fox	ABC
January 1	Mobile, AL–Pensacola, FL	WALA-TV	10	NBC	Fox
January 1	Mobile, AL–Pensacola, FL	WPMI	15	Fox	NBC
January 1	New Orleans, LA	WVUE-TV	8	ABC	Fox
January 1	New Orleans, LA	WGNO	26	The WB	ABC
January 1	New Orleans, LA	WNOL-TV	38	Fox	The WB
January 1	Twin Falls, ID	KKVI	35	ABC	Fox
January 1	Reno, NV	KAME-TV	21	Fox	UPN
March 1	Bakersfield, CA	KERO-TV	23	CBS	ABC
March 1	Bakersfield, CA	KBAK-TV	29	ABC	CBS
March 14	Greensboro, NC	WBFX	20	CTN	The WB
April 1	Fairbanks, AK	KTVF	11	CBS	NBC
April 4	Binghamton, NY	WICZ-TV	40	NBC	Fox
May 26	South Bend, IN	W12BK	12	Independent	ABC
June 3	Cincinnati, OH	WCPO-TV	9	CBS	ABC
June 3	Cincinnati, OH	WKRC-TV	12	ABC	CBS
June 19	Greensboro, NC	WGGT-TV	48	ABC	UPN
July 1	New York, NY	WNYC-TV/WBIS	31	PBS	Independent
August 19	Charleston, SC	WCBD-TV	2	ABC	NBC
August 19	Charleston, SC	WCIV	4	NBC	ABC
September 1	Birmingham–Tuscaloosa, AL	WBRC	6	ABC	Fox
September 1	Birmingham–Tuscaloosa, AL	WDBB/WTTO	17/21	Fox	Independent
September 1	Birmingham–Tuscaloosa, AL	WCFT-TV	33	CBS	ABC
September 1	Birmingham–Tuscaloosa, AL	WJSU-TV	40	CBS	ABC
September 1	Birmingham–Tuscaloosa, AL	WNAL-TV	44	Fox	CBS
September 1	Birmingham–Tuscaloosa, AL	W58CK	58	Independent	ABC
September 1	Lincoln, NE	KSNB-TV	4	ABC	Fox
September 29	Mobile, AL–Pensacola, FL	WFGX	35	Independent	The WB
December 31	Akron–Cleveland, OH	WAKC-TV	23	ABC	inTV

=== Station closures ===
Date	Market	Station	Channel	Affiliation
May 5	Bluefield, WV	WVGV-TV	59	The WB

== Births ==
Date	Name	Notability
January 3	Florence Pugh	Actress
January 9	Oana Gregory	Actress (Crash and Bernstein)
January 15	Dove Cameron	Actress (Liv and Maddie, Descendants, Descendants: Wicked World, Agents of S.H.I.E.L.D.) and singer
January 17	Caitlin Sanchez	Voice actress (Dora on Dora the Explorer (2008–11))
January 18	Sarah Gilman	Actress (I Didn't Do It)
January 22	Sami Gayle	Actress (Blue Bloods, Milo Murphy's Law)
January 27	Braeden Lemasters	Actor (Men of a Certain Age, Betrayal)
February 1	Rahart Adams	Actor (Every Witch Way)
February 6	Dalton Rapattoni	Singer (American Idol)
February 7	David Castro	Actor (Shadowhunters)
February 7	Jake Goldberg	Voice actor (Pablo on The Backyardigans (2006–10))
February 9	Jimmy Bennett	Actor (No Ordinary Family)
February 9	Kelli Berglund	Actress (Lab Rats, Lab Rats: Elite Force)
February 17	Sasha Pieterse	Actress (Pretty Little Liars) and singer
February 19	Allen Alvarado	Actor (Flight 29 Down)
February 21	Sophie Turner	English actress (Game of Thrones)
February 28	Bobb'e J. Thompson	Actor (That's So Raven, Tyler Perry's House of Payne)
March 15	Maxwell Jacob Friedman	Pro wrestler
March 22	Gig Morton	Canadian actor (Mr. Young)
March 30	Madeleine Peters	Canadian voice actress (Martha Speaks, My Little Pony: Friendship Is Magic)
March 31	Liza Koshy	Actress
April 3	Sarah Jeffery	Canadian actress (Descendants: Wicked World)
April 4	Austin Mahone	American singer
April 6	Miranda May	Actress (Bunk'd)
April 10	Audrey Whitby	Actress (The Thundermans)
April 14	Abigail Breslin	Actress (Scream Queens)
April 17	Dee Dee Davis	Actress (The Bernie Mac Show)
April 18	Roy Woods	Singer
April 25	Allisyn Snyder	Actress (Sonny with a Chance, So Random!)
May 3	Noah Munck	Actor (iCarly, The Goldbergs)
May 8	Noah Centineo	Actor (The Fosters)
May 9	Mary Mouser	Actress (Body of Proof, Scandal, Cobra Kai)
May 14	McKaley Miller	Actress
May 17	Ryan Ochoa	Actor (iCarly, Pair of Kings)
May 18	Violett Beane	Actress
May 24	Frank Dolce	Actor (Sons of Tucson)
June 2	Jacy Jayne	Pro wrestler
June 16	Cody Lohan	Actor (Living Lohan)
June 20	Claudia Lee	Actress
June 25	Lele Pons	Actress and youtuber
July 13	Jena Irene	Singer (American Idol)
July 16	Chayce Beckham	Singer (American Idol)
July 16	Nicky Jones	Voice actor (Chowder)
July 17	Jermaine Harris	Actor (Saturdays)
July 21	Joey Bragg	Actor (Liv and Maddie)
July 22	Skyler Gisondo	Actor
July 23	Rachel G. Fox	Actress
July 24	Herizen F. Guardiola	Actress
July 30	Austin North	Actor (I Didn't Do It)
July 31	Blake Michael	Actor (Dog With a Blog)
August 1	Cymphonique Miller	Actress (Phineas and Ferb, How to Rock) and singer
August 7	Liam James	Actor
August 12	Torri Webster	Canadian actress (Life with Boys)
August 13	Tessa Albertson	Actress
August 21	Jamia Simone Nash	Actress (The Backyardigans, The Young and the Restless)
August 22	Mickey Graue	Actor (Lost)
August 25	Naelee Rae	Actress (The Backyardigans, The Guiding Light)
September 1	Zendaya	Actress (Shake It Up, K.C. Undercover, Euphoria) and singer
September 2	Austin Abrams	Actor (Dash & Lily, Euphoria)
September 4	Victoria Moroles	Actress (Liv and Maddie, Teen Wolf)
September 6	Alex Christian Jones	Actor (Kickin' It)
September 10	Kamil McFadden	Actor (K.C. Undercover)
September 12	Colin Ford	Actor (Under the Dome, Jake on Jake and the Never Land Pirates)
September 13	Lili Reinhart	Actress (Riverdale)
September 15	Jake Cherry	Actor
September 18	Kurt Doss	Actor (Ruby & the Rockits)
October 9	Bella Hadid	American model and sister of Gigi Hadid
October 10	Sarah Carpenter	Actress (Girl Meets World)
October 16	Tyler Perez	Actor (WITS Academy)
October 28	Sarah Carpenter	Actress (Girl Meets World)
November 2	Liam Obergfoll	Actress (Talia in the Kitchen)
November 6	Chelsea Zhang	Actress (Titans, Daybreak, Andi Mack)
November 14	Mason Gooding	Actor (Love, Victor)
November 18	Noah Ringer	Actor
November 19	Gabrielle Elyse	Actress (Nicky, Ricky, Dicky & Dawn, The Thundermans)
November 21	Grace Van Patten	Actress
November 22	Hailey Baldwin	American fashion model and daughter of Stephen Baldwin
November 22	Mackenzie Lintz	Actress (Under the Dome)
November 22	Madison Davenport	Actress (Shameless, From Dusk till Dawn: The Series) and singer
December 6	Stefanie Scott	Actress (A.N.T. Farm)
December 8	Teala Dunn	Actress (Wonder Pets, The Naked Brothers Band, Are We There Yet?, The Thundermans)
December 11	Hailee Steinfeld	Actress and singer
December 11	Jack Griffo	Actor (The Thundermans) and singer
December 20	Timothy McCartney	Actor
December 21	Kaitlyn Dever	Actress (Justified, Last Man Standing)
December 29	Dylan Minnette	Actor (Lost, Awake, 13 Reasons Why)
December 30	Raymond Cham	Actor (Mech-X4)

== Deaths ==
Date	Name	Age	Notability
February 3	Audrey Meadows	73	Actress (Alice Kramden on The Honeymooners)
February 13	Martin Balsam	76	Actor (Murray on Archie Bunker's Place)
February 15	McLean Stevenson	68	Actor (Lt. Col. Henry Blake on M*A*S*H)
February 15	Tommy Rettig	54	Child actor (Jeff on Lassie)
March 4	Minnie Pearl	83	Comedian
March 5	Whit Bissell	86	Character actor
March 9	George Burns	100	Comedian (The George Burns and Gracie Allen Show)
March 11	Vince Edwards	67	Actor (Ben Casey)
April 21	Jimmy Snyder	77	Sports commentator (The NFL Today)
May 20	Jon Pertwee	76	Actor (Third Doctor on Doctor Who)
June 2	Ray Combs	40	Host of Family Feud
June 5	Vito Scotti	78	Character actor, Gilligan's Island
June 16	Mel Allen	83	Sports commentator
July 21	Herb Edelman	62	Actor (Stanley Zbornak on The Golden Girls)
August 27	Greg Morris	62	Actor (Mission: Impossible)
September 13	Tupac Shakur	25	Actor and songwriter
October 6	Ted Bessell	61	Actor and director (Donald on That Girl)
October 28	Morey Amsterdam	87	Actor and comedian (Buddy on The Dick Van Dyke Show)
October 31	Arthur Peterson Jr.	83	Actor (Soap)
November 13	Alma Kitchell	103	Hostess (In the Kelvinator Kitchen)
December 8	Howard Rollins	46	Actor (Tibbs on In the Heat of the Night)
December 12	Larry Gates	81	Soap opera actor (Guiding Light)
December 14	Edward K. Milkis	65	Producer

== See also ==
- 1996 in the United States
- List of American films of 1996
