= Hilltop School =

Hilltop School or Hill Top School may refer to:

- The school from Timothy Goes to School
- A preschool housed in the former Bangor Children's Home building
- Hill Top Preparatory School, in Radnor Township, Pennsylvania
- Hilltop Country Day School, Sparta, New Jersey

== See also ==
- Hilltop Baptist School
- Hilltop High School (disambiguation)
