= Sparta High School (New Jersey) =

High school in Sussex County, New Jersey, US

Location
- 70 West Mountain Road; Sparta, Sussex County, New Jersey 07871; United States; 41.055616°N 74.624186°W

Information
- Type: Public high school
- Motto: It takes a little more to be a Spartan
- Established: September 1959
- School district: Sparta Township Public School District
- NCES School ID: 341551005396
- Principal: Jamie Barker
- Faculty: 99.2 FTEs
- Grades: 9-12
- Enrollment: 1,025 (as of 2024–25)
- Student to teacher ratio: 10.3:1
- Colors: Navy; Columbia blue and white
- Athletics conference: Northwest Jersey Athletic Conference (general); North Jersey Super Football Conference (football)
- Team name: Spartans
- Publication: Beginnings
- Newspaper: The Oracle
- Yearbook: Olympian
- Website: www.sparta.org/o/shs

Sparta High School is a four-year comprehensive community public high school serving students in ninth through twelfth grades from Sparta, in Sussex County, in the U.S. state of New Jersey, operating as the lone secondary school of the Sparta Township Public School District.

As of the 2024–25 school year, the school had an enrollment of 1,025 students and 99.2 classroom teachers (on an FTE basis), for a student–teacher ratio of 10.3:1. There were 62 students (6.0% of enrollment) eligible for free lunch and 12 (1.2% of students) eligible for reduced-cost lunch.

== History ==
The school opened in September 1959 after Newton High School in neighboring Newton, which had served Sparta students, could no longer take on Sparta's rapidly growing high school-aged population. The sending districts of Hopatcong and Byram Township combined with Sparta to form the initial student body. In its first year of operation, Sparta High enrolled over 400 students enrolled in just three grades, from the three communities that shared the school. In May 1964, Sparta graduated its first class—of 160 students—that had attended the school for all four years.

Hopatcong High School opened for the 1969–70 school year, with students entering 12th grade being the only Hopatcong students remaining at Sparta High School. The loss of students being sent from Hopatcong to Sparta caused enrollment of tuition-paying students to decline to 379, a drop of almost half from the prior year.

Students from Byram Township had attended Sparta High School until 1974, when Lenape Valley Regional High School was created.

During the 1970s, Sparta High School instituted split sessions to help alleviate problems brought on by increased enrollment. This was only a temporary fix, however, and the township later approved a referendum to build an annex onto the back of the school, more than doubling its area. The section added a new cafeteria, a library, and open classroom spaces.

In the early 1990s, the open spaces provided by the built-on annex were renovated and became closed classrooms. By this time, over one thousand students—all from Sparta—were enrolled in the school. Later in the 1990s, the high school was expanded yet again, adding a new science wing and a number of technological upgrades.

In September 2006, Sparta residents approved a referendum to perform major renovations on the school. The construction began in the spring of 2008 and was completed by the beginning of the 2010-2011 school year. This reconstruction was to alleviate the issue of overcrowding that the school faced. During the construction, many classrooms were displaced to a cluster of modular trailer rooms.

== Awards, recognition and rankings ==
The school was the 34th-ranked public high school in New Jersey out of 339 schools statewide in New Jersey Monthly magazine's September 2014 cover story on the state's "Top Public High Schools", using a new ranking methodology. The school had been ranked 83rd in the state of 328 schools in 2012, after being ranked 78th in 2010 out of 322 schools listed. The magazine ranked the school 63rd in 2008 out of 316 schools. The school was ranked 73rd in the magazine's September 2006 issue, which included 316 schools across the state. Schooldigger.com ranked the school tied for 104th out of 381 public high schools statewide in its 2011 rankings (a decrease of 6 positions from the 2010 ranking) which were based on the combined percentage of students classified as proficient or above proficient on the mathematics (86.6%) and language arts literacy (96.2%) components of the High School Proficiency Assessment (HSPA).

For the 2013-14 school year, Sparta High School ranked first out of nine public high schools in SAT scores.

== Sports ==
The Sparta High School Spartans compete in the Northwest Jersey Athletic Conference, which is comprised of public and private high schools in Morris, Sussex and Warren counties, and was established following a reorganization of sports leagues in Northern New Jersey by the New Jersey State Interscholastic Athletic Association (NJSIAA). Sparta High School had participated in the Sussex County Interscholastic League until the SCIL was dissolved in 2009 as part of the NJSIAA's restructuring. With 824 students in grades 10-12, the school was classified by the NJSIAA for the 2019–20 school year as Group III for most athletic competition purposes, which included schools with an enrollment of 761 to 1,058 students in that grade range. The football team competes in the United Red division of the North Jersey Super Football Conference, which includes 112 schools competing in 20 divisions, making it the nation's biggest football-only high school sports league. The school was classified by the NJSIAA as Group III North for football for 2024–2026, which included schools with 700 to 884 students.

Interscholastic sports programs compete in one of three seasons:

- Fall: Football, Boys' Soccer, Girls' Soccer, Unified Soccer, Cross-Country (Boys' & Girls'), Field Hockey, Girls' Volleyball, Cheerleading, Marching Band, and Girls' Tennis
- Winter: Boys' Basketball, Girls' Basketball, Unified Basketball, Skiing (Boys' & Girls'), Bowling (Boys' & Girls'), Winter Track (Boys' & Girls'), Wrestling, Swimming (Boys' & Girls'), and Ice Hockey
- Spring: Track and Field (Boys' & Girls'), Unified Track and Field, Boys' Lacrosse, Girls Lacrosse', Baseball, Softball, Golf (Boys' & Girls') and Boys' Tennis

The school participates with Jefferson Township High School in a joint ice hockey team in which Kinnelon High School is the host school / lead agency. The co-op program operates under agreements scheduled to expire at the end of the 2023–24 school year.

The football team won the North I Group II state sectional championship in 1976, 1979, 1980, 1982 and 2003 and won the North I Group III title in 2013 and 2014. The 1976 team won the North I Group II state sectional title with a 34-7 win against Tenafly High School in the championship game. A punt returned for a touchdown provided the margin needed to win the 1979 North I Group II state sectional title with a 14-7 victory against Garfield High School in the playoff finals to finish the season 10-0-1. The 1980 team finished the season with an 11-0 record after winning the North I Group II state sectional title by defeating Saddle Brook by a score of 13-7 in overtime in the championship game. A stout defense helped the 1982 team defeat Ridgefield Park High School by a score of 21-14 in the North I Group II sectional championship game to finish the season with a record of 11-0. In 2003, Sparta's football team won the North I, Group II state championship at Giants Stadium against Dover High School by a score of 16-0 in the championship game, finishing the season with a 12-0 record and making them Sussex County's only 12-win undefeated football team. The team won consecutive North I Group III sectional titles against River Dell High School, winning by a score of 40-0 in 2013 and 31-23 in 2014.

The boys' track team won the Group II spring / outdoor track state championship in 1976 and 1977.

The boys' cross country team won the Group II state championship in 1979.

The boys' wrestling team won the North I Group II sectional title in 1983 and the North I Group III title in 2000; the team won the Group II state championship in 1983. The boys' wrestling team won the North I, Group III state sectional championship in 2000 with a 36-29 win against Indian Hills High School.

The girls' basketball team won the Group II state championship in 1985 (defeating Middle Township High School in the title game) and won the Group III title in 1990 (vs. Pennsauken High School), 2001 (vs. Toms River South High School) and 2022 (vs. Mainland Regional High School). In 1985, the team finished the season 29-0 after defeating Middle Township in the Group II championship game, played at the Brendan Byrne Arena. The 2001 girls' basketball team won the North I, Group III state sectional championship with a 36-32 win versus Northern Highlands Regional High School. The team moved on to win the 2001 Group II state championship, defeating West Morris Mendham High School in the semifinals and Toms River High School South in the finals to take the title. The team won the 2003 North I, Group III title with a 34-28 win against Pascack Valley High School in the tournament final. The 2006 team won the North I, Group III title in a low-scoring match, topping Northern Highlands Regional High School by a final score of 27-18.

In 1995, Sparta's boys' soccer team won the state sectional championship and had a final season record of 21-2. The team finished first in the S.C.I.L with an undefeated record of 18-0.

The ice hockey team won the McMullen Cup in 2010-2012.

The softball team won the Group III state championship in 2011 vs. Middletown High School South. In 2005, the softball team won the North I, Group III state title with a 2-1 win against Nutley High School.

The girls' outdoor track and field team won the Group II state championship in 2018.

=== Academic excellence off the field ===
The boys' soccer team has earned the National Soccer Coaches Association of America's High School Boys Team Academic Award for seven consecutive seasons (2003–04 through 2010–11) and nine of ten dating back to 2001–02. To qualify for the award, the team must have a minimum grade point average of 3.25 for the entire academic year. The team GPA is determined by adding every player's GPA, then dividing by the number of players. Sparta is one of only two boys' soccer teams in all of New Jersey to be recognized in each of the past seven years (Woodbury High School is the other).

== Graduation rate ==
According to the New Jersey Herald, the graduation rate for Sparta High School was 94.7%. This rate exceeds the national high school graduation rate of approximately 70%. Sparta High School has had the highest graduation rate in Sussex County.

== Clubs and student activities ==
Sparta High School has many clubs, academically-related teams and student activities to choose from. The creation of a new club require a teacher sponsor for the cause (tasked with supervising) and approval from the school's administration.

== Administration ==
The school's principal is Jamie Barker. Her core administration team includes the two assistant principals.

== Notable alumni ==
- Greg Baty (born 1964), former NFL player
- Mike Budnik (born 1974), former professional inline skater and professional mixed martial arts fighter
- Cassidy, songwriter, recording artist, actor and singer, who was the lead singer for the band Antigone Rising
- Frank Dolce (born 1996, class of 2014), actor who appeared on television on Sons of Tucson and on Broadway in Billy Elliot the Musical
- Mike Inganamort (born 1984), politician who represents the 24th legislative district in the New Jersey General Assembly since January 2024
- Chris Jent (born 1970), basketball coach and former NBA player
- Dan Miller (born 1981), mixed martial arts fighter and Cage Fury Fighting Championships Middleweight Champion
- Jim Miller (born 1983), mixed martial arts fighter and Cage Fury Fighting Championships Lightweight Champion
- John Anthony Rodriguez (born 2000), musician, who performs as "54 Ultra" and is best known for his smooth, Latin soul-influenced vocals
- Kevin Rogers (born 1951, class of 1969), American football coach and former player
- Jesse James West (born 2000), YouTuber and bodybuilder
