= Hilltop High School =

Hilltop High School may refer to:

- Hilltop High School (California), in Chula Vista
- Hilltop High School (Ohio), in West Unity
- Hilltop High School (Whitecourt), in Whitecourt, Alberta

== See also ==
- Hilltop Baptist School, a defunct K–12 school in Colorado Springs
- Hill Top High School, a defunct school in West Bromwich, West Midlands, England
- Hilltop School (disambiguation)
