= Andress =

Andress is a surname and occasional given name. Notable people with the name include:

Surname

- Brenda Andress (born 20th century), Canadian women's hockey league commissioner
- Herb Andress (1935–2004), Austrian film and TV actor
- John Andress (born 1984), Irish rugby union player
- Ingrid Andress (born 1991), American country music singer
- Mary Vail Andress (1883–1964), American banker
- Stanford Andress (born 20th century), Colorado author and political candidate
- Ursula Andress (born 1936), Swiss actress
- David Andress (born 1969), English historian

Given name

- Andress Small Floyd (1873–1933), American philanthropist

== Other uses ==
- Andress High School, El Paso, Texas
