= Gold Rush (disambiguation) =

A gold rush is a sharp migration of people to an area believed to have significant gold deposits.

Gold Rush or Goldrush may also refer to:

== Gold rushes ==
- Gold rush § By region:
  - Australian gold rushes
  - Black Hills gold rush
  - California gold rush
  - Cariboo Gold Rush
  - Klondike Gold Rush
  - Nome Gold Rush
  - Otago gold rush
  - West Coast gold rush, New Zealand
  - Witwatersrand Gold Rush

== Arts, entertainment, and media ==
=== Films ===
- Gold Rush (1998 film), a Hong Kong film with Lung Fong
- Goldrush: A Real Life Alaskan Adventure, a 1998 made-for-TV adventure film
- Kummeli: Kultakuume or Kummeli: Goldrush, a Finnish film
- The Gold Rush, 1925 Charlie Chaplin film

=== Gaming ===
- Gold Rush!, a computer adventure game
- Gold Rush, a map on Team Fortress 2
- Impossible Spell Card, a video game, one version of which was called Danmaku Amanojaku - Gold Rush

=== Music ===
- Goldrush (band), a rock band

==== Albums ====
- Gold Rush (album), a 2011 album by I Can Make a Mess Like Nobody's Business
- "Gold Rush", a 2017 album by Ike Moriz
- After the Gold Rush, a 1970 album by Neil Young featuring a song of the same name

==== Songs ====
- "After the Gold Rush" (song), a 1970 song by Neil Young from the album of the same name
- "Goldrush (song)", a song by Yello from the 1987 album One Second
- "Gold Rush", a song by DJ Yoshitaka and Michael a la mode from the 2007 video game Beatmania IIDX: Gold
- "The Goldrush", a song by Coldplay from the 2009 album Life in Technicolor II
- "Gold Rush", a song by Ed Sheeran from the 2011 album +
- "Gold Rush", a song by Clinton Sparks from the 2014 EP ICONoclast
- "Gold Rush" (song), a song by Death Cab for Cutie from the 2017 album Thank You for Today
- "Gold Rush", a song by Taylor Swift from the 2020 album Evermore
- "Gold Rush", a 2023 single from Bryce Vine

=== Other uses in arts, entertainment, and media ===
- Gold Rush (TV series), a documentary television series that airs on Discovery Channel
  - Gold Rush: White Water, a spin-off series of Gold Rush
- Gold Rush (web series), a 2006 American reality competition web series
- "Gold Rush" (Bugs), a 1996 television episode
- "Gold Rush!", a 1986 episode of The Raccoons
- Gold Rush, a 1998 novel by Miri Yu
- Gold Rush Country (Dreamworld), a themed area inside the Dreamworld amusement park in Gold Coast, Australia
- Gold Rush (Slagharen), a roller coaster at Attractiepark Slagharen in the Netherlands
- Gold Rush (Drayton Manor), a roller coaster at Drayton Manor Resort in the United Kingdom
- San Francisco 49ers Gold Rush, the cheerleaders of the San Francisco 49ers, an American football team

== Places ==
- Klondike Gold Rush National Historical Park, a United States National Historical Park

== Sports ==
The Gold Rush (horse race)

== See also ==
- Gold Fever (disambiguation)
