= Kevin Rogers (American football) =

American football player and coach (born 1951)

Cleveland Browns
- Title: Senior offensive assistant

Personal information
- Born: September 7, 1951 (age 75); Brooklyn, New York

Career information
- College: William & Mary (1971–1973)

Career history
- Bayside HS (VA) (1974–1976) Assistant; Ohio State (1977–1978) Graduate assistant; Mainland HS (FL) (1979) Head coach; William & Mary (1980–1982) Running backs coach; Navy (1983–1990) Quarterbacks coach; Syracuse (1991–1994) Quarterbacks coach; Syracuse (1995–1996) Associate head coach & quarterbacks coach; Syracuse (1997–1998) Offensive coordinator/associate head coach/quarterbacks coach; Notre Dame (1999–2001) Offensive coordinator & quarterbacks coach; Virginia Tech (2002–2005) Quarterbacks coach; Minnesota Vikings (2006–2010) Quarterbacks coach; Boston College (2011) Offensive coordinator; Temple (2012) Assistant head coach & quarterbacks coach; William & Mary (2013–2016) Offensive coordinator & quarterbacks coach; Cleveland Browns (2020–present) Senior offensive assistant & special projects

Kevin Sean Rogers (born September 7, 1951) is an American football coach and former player. In his 38-year career, Rogers has coached in 13 postseason bowl games and multiple NFL playoff games as an assistant coach. He is a senior offensive assistant for the Cleveland Browns.

== High school and college career ==
Rogers graduated from Sparta High School in Sparta Township, New Jersey in 1969 and attended Massanutten Military Academy in Woodstock, Virginia for a post-graduate year before going to The College of William & Mary. At William & Mary, Rogers played for Lou Holtz.

== Coaching career ==
During his time at Syracuse University under head coach Paul Pasqualoni, Rogers coached Donovan McNabb and Marvin Graves. Both of whom set team passing records. McNabb was the 1994 Big East Rookie of the Year, 1997 Big East Player of the Year and a four time All Big East player. In 1998, McNabb was the #2 overall pick in the NFL draft. Rogers also coached Kevin Mason when he made All Big East in 1993. In 1995, 96 and 97, Syracuse won the Big East Championship.

Prior to his time at Syracuse Rogers coached a variety of positions for the Naval Academy. Rogers also coached at William & Mary and Ohio State University under Woody Hayes.

While offensive coordinator for Notre Dame Fighting Irish football, Rogers coached a Notre Dame offense that broke the school single-season record for total passing yards, completions and attempts. In 2000, Rogers' offense set an NCAA record for fewest turnovers in a season.

At Virginia Tech under Frank Beamer, Rogers coached Bryan Randall when he became the Hokies all-time passing leader. In 2004, Randall was named the Player of the Year in the ACC and the league's top offensive player. Rogers also coached Marcus Vick in 2005, when Vick made All ACC. In 2004, Virginia Tech won the ACC championship.

With the Minnesota Vikings, Rogers coached Tarvaris Jackson and Brett Favre. During this time, Favre posted one of his best statistical seasons. While there, the Vikings won the NFC North Division title twice and made it to the NFC Championship Game once.

After four seasons at his alma mater, Rogers announced his resignation on February 28, 2017.

On March 3, 2023, the Cleveland Browns announced Rogers as their senior assistant, special projects.
