= Sparta Township Public School District =

School district in Sussex County, New Jersey, US

Address
- 18 Mohawk Avenue Sparta, Sussex County, New Jersey, 07871; United States
- Coordinates: 41.033574°N 74.63908°W

District information
- Grades: PreK-12
- Superintendent: Matthew L. Beck
- Business administrator: Joanne Black
- Schools: 5

Students and staff
- Enrollment: 3,236 (as of 2021–22)
- Faculty: 290.6 FTEs
- Student–teacher ratio: 11.1:1

Other information
- District Factor Group: I
- Website: www.sparta.org
Ind.	Per pupil	District spending	Rank (*)	K-12 average	%± vs. average
1A	Total Spending	$19,411	53	$18,891	2.8%
1	Budgetary Cost	13,484	29	14,783	−8.8%
2	Classroom Instruction	8,088	33	8,763	−7.7%
6	Support Services	2,085	37	2,392	−12.8%
8	Administrative Cost	1,363	16	1,485	−8.2%
10	Operations & Maintenance	1,557	30	1,783	−12.7%
13	Extracurricular Activities	332	16	268	23.9%
16	Median Teacher Salary	68,863	54	64,043
Data from NJDoE 2014 Taxpayers' Guide to Education Spending. *Of K-12 districts with 1,800-3,500 students. Lowest spending=1; Highest=68

The Sparta Township Public School District is a comprehensive community public school district that serves students in pre-kindergarten through twelfth grade from Sparta, in Sussex County, in the U.S. state of New Jersey.

As of the 2021–22 school year, the district, comprising five schools, had an enrollment of 3,236 students and 290.6 classroom teachers (on an FTE basis), for a student–teacher ratio of 11.1:1.

The district is classified by the New Jersey Department of Education as being in District Factor Group "I", the second highest of eight groupings. District Factor Groups organize districts statewide to allow comparison by common socioeconomic characteristics of the local districts. From lowest socioeconomic status to highest, the categories are A, B, CD, DE, FG, GH, I and J.

== Schools ==
Schools in the district (with 2021–22 enrollment data from the National Center for Education Statistics) are:

Elementary schools

- Alpine Elementary School with 725 students in grades PreK-2.
  - Peter Miller, principal
- Mohawk Avenue School with 231 students in grade 3.
  - Katie Madsen, principal
- Helen Morgan School with 476 students in grades 4–5.
  - Douglas E. Layman, principal

Middle school

- Sparta Middle School with 719 students in grades 6–8.
  - Frank Ciaburri, principal

High school

- Sparta High School with 1,065 students in grades 9–12.
  - Edward Lazzara, principal

== Administration ==
Core members of the district's administration are:

- Matthew L. Beck, superintendent
- Joanne Black, business administrator and board secretary

== Board of education ==
The district's board of education, comprised of nine members, sets policy and oversees the fiscal and educational operation of the district through its administration. As a Type II school district, the board's trustees are elected directly by voters to serve three-year terms of office on a staggered basis, with three seats up for election each year held (since 2012) as part of the November general election. The board appoints a superintendent to oversee the district's day-to-day operations and a business administrator to supervise the business functions of the district. The Board of Education Offices are located in the Mohawk Avenue School Building.
