= Cassidy (musician) =

American singer-songwriter and actor

Cassidy Catanzaro (also known by her stage names Cassidy or Cassidy Joy) is an American singer, songwriter, and actor, known as the lead singer and writer for the band Antigone Rising from 1999 through 2008.

== Early life and education ==
Catanzaro grew up in Sparta, New Jersey, and attended Sparta High School. She is a graduate of the Upright Citizens Brigade (UCB) for Improvisational Comedy.

== Career ==
=== 1999–2008: Antigone Rising ===
Catanzaro was the lead singer and principal writer for the band Antigone Rising from 1999 through 2008. In 1999, living again in Los Angeles, she was approached by Antigone Rising who was looking for a new lead singer. She sent the band a demo tape, and after a face-to-face meeting she was asked to join. Cassidy presented the band with songs she had written while spending time in Los Angeles, and these songs later convinced Lava/Atlantic executive Jason Flom to sign the all-female band to a record deal.

The band released four independent albums with Cassidy singing lead vocals. Their major label debut From the Ground Up, produced by Neil Dorfsman, was released through a deal between Starbucks coffee shops' Hear Music series and Lava/Atlantic Records.

Antigone Rising were featured multiple times in Rolling Stone magazine, whose veteran writer David Fricke described Cassidy as "a vocal dynamo" and hailed their show as the "big rock show of the SxSW festival". They were featured in national commercials for 7 Jeans, and appeared in all Conde Nast magazines in the Spring of 2006.

Although the band received very little radio play, they sold over one million copies of From the Ground Up, and 3 million records across all releases.

The band toured with the Rolling Stones, Aerosmith, Dave Mathews, and Rob Thomas, and appeared on late night and morning television. Thomas also co-wrote and produced tracks for the band, and called Cassidy "a born star". Cassidy also appears on multiple tracks on Rob Thomas' first solo album Something To Be, including the title track, "This is How A Heart Breaks", and "My My My".

After Jason Flom was fired from Atlantic Records in 2007, Antigone Rising asked to be released from their contract. After another year of touring, Cassidy left the band in 2008, and spent the next two years acting and appearing in a National 'Gap campaign Born to Fit.

=== 2010–present: Cassidy and The Music/Boheme ===
In 2010 Cassidy was approached by a private investor to launch her own record label and release a solo album. She subsequently wrote and produced her debut album Follow The Freedom, released on her Band and Mountain label. The album's title track featured Cassidy's friend Steve Perry of Journey. The first single "Blind Spot" was added to Triple A radio nationwide and the music video was picked up by national retailers and outlets including, LA Fitness, Lady Footlocker, and Harley Davidson stores. The title track "Follow The Freedom" got a featured artist spot on VH1's Hollywood Exes in the early fall of 2012.

Her second solo album, Cassidy and The Music, was recorded in Woodstock, New York, and began releasing tracks in January 2014.

Cassidy has also worked with producer and songwriter Max Martin, which led to her songs being recorded by major artists, including Demi Lovato's "For You" from her 2015 album Confident.

From 2017-2020, Cassidy starred in the World Symphony Tour of Women Rock produced by Schirmer Theatricals and Greenberg Artists out of New York City.

=== Acting ===
Cassidy made her film acting debut in the 2009 film The Skeptic starring Zoe Saldaña and written and directed by Tennyson Bardwell. She played the lead role of Tabatha in the stage production of Parallel Worlds - A New Rock Music Experience, which ran until June 2016 in Los Angeles. She revived the character in the 2022 film version of the work.
