= Jack Thomas Smith =

American film director

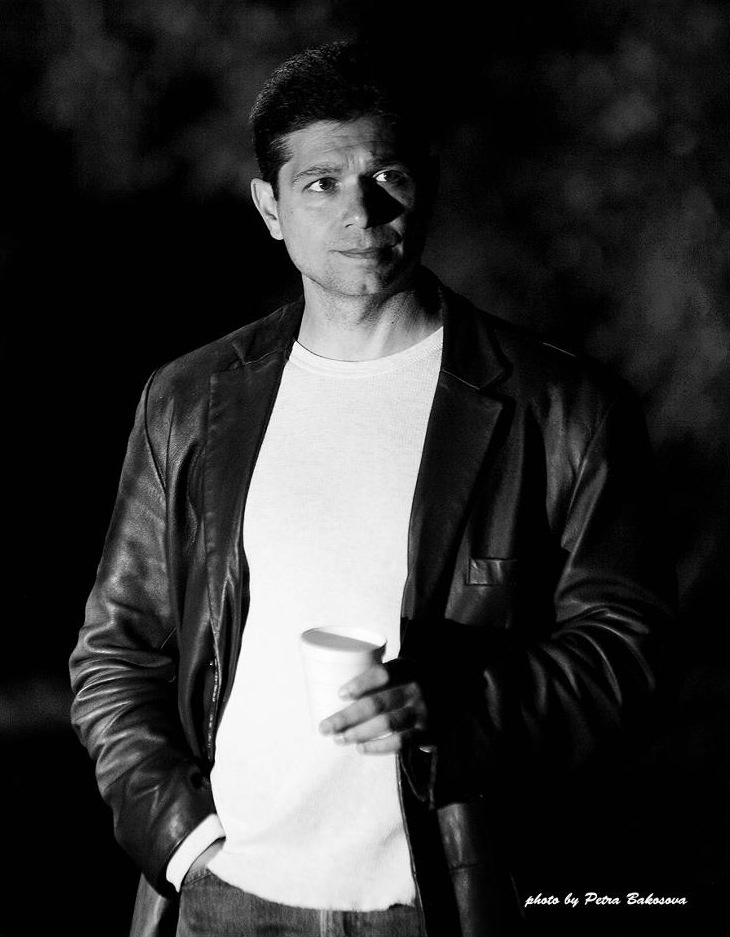
- Smith on the set of Infliction in 2011
- Born: March 10, 1969 (age 57); Philadelphia, Pennsylvania, U.S.
- Occupations: Screenwriter, film producer, film director
- Years active: 1996-present
- Children: Megan Cruz
- Website: Official website

Jack Thomas Smith (born March 10, 1969) is an American producer, writer and director of feature films and documentary television series. His feature horror films include Disorder and Infliction. Smith is a member of the Horror Writers Association.

== Early life ==
Jack Thomas Smith was born on March 10, 1969 in Philadelphia, Pennsylvania. He has a brother, Michael A. Smith. Their family lived in Philadelphia until he was eight, when his family relocated to a quiet island community in Michigan. He began to develop an interest in storytelling and horror at the age of nine when he read the Stephen King novel The Shining. As a teenager, he moved to Sparta, New Jersey.

Smith initially desired to be a writer, and completed a 300-page horror novel by the time he was eleven, though it was never published. While in his teens, Smith's father bought him a Super 8 film camera, with which Smith, Michael, and their friends shot horror and comedy shorts in the neighborhood. From that point, his interests shifted to filmmaking.

== Career ==
While living in Sparta, Smith worked at a video store, where he discovered the films of George A. Romero, Stanley Kubrick, Brian De Palma, John Carpenter, Wes Craven, and Tobe Hooper, who would influence his work. It was during this time that he began working on his first screenplay. He became friends with a customer named Lee Estrada who was a frequent renter of horror films, and who put Smith into contact with Ted Bohus, an independent horror filmmaker. When Smith sent Bohus his script, Bohus reacted positively to it, though he felt the budget it required was too high to produce it as an independent film, and suggested to Smith that they work on a screenplay for a different film. They co-wrote The Regenerated Man, and after raising the financing for the film's USD $75,000 budget, Bohus directed it, while Smith worked with the film crew in order to learn how to perform their duties, saying, "I learned every job in making a movie. I held the boom, worked the lights. You've got to check your ego at the door." After completing it, the two filmmakers sold it to Arrow Entertainment for $150,000, doubling their investment.

Smith subsequently met John A. Russo, the writer of one of Smith's favorite films, the 1968 film Night of the Living Dead. Smith raised the financing for Russo's script for the 1996 horror film Santa Claws, which is about a serial murderer dressed as Santa Claus. The film was distributed by EI Independent.

Smith wrote, produced and directed his directorial debut, the psychological thriller called Disorder, executive produced by Chris Valentino. The film was shot in 61 days in the Poconos, in Blairstown, New Jersey (where the 1980 film Friday the 13th was filmed) and in the woods near Millbrook Village, New Jersey, in a 300-year-old abandoned house owned by the National Park Service. Smith, who had full creative control on it, learned much about filmmaking during the course of its production. The film opened as a limited theatrical release in the United States in mid-2006 and was subsequently released on DVD by Universal/Vivendi and on pay-per-view and video on demand by Warner Brothers.

In 2005, he directed the music video for the Purple Pam song "Take Me Away".

Smith's next feature film was the found footage horror drama Infliction, which he wrote, directed and produced through his production company, Fox Trail Productions Inc. Filmed from October 3 to November 4, 2011, in Mooresville, Cornelius, Salisbury and Charlotte, North Carolina, with a cast of actors based mostly in Charlotte, Infliction depicts two brothers, John and Kenneth Stiles, as they chronicle a vigilante murder spree in North Carolina in 2011. Smith chose to structure the story, which was inspired by an acquaintance of Smith's who lived through an experience similar to the one depicted in the film, as a first-person narrative in order to provide the audience with a behind-the-scenes perspective into how the motives for the crimes develop, and the effects of long-term child abuse. The film won Best Story at the Buffalo Niagara Film Festival in 2013, and was shown at several screenings on the East Coast, including at New York City's Anthology Film Archives, and at a number of horror conventions that year. It was positively reviewed by East Stroudsburg University's Stroud Courier and the Pocono Record. The film opened as a limited theatrical release in the U.S. in the second quarter of 2014. It was subsequently released on DVD, and video on demand on July 1, 2014, by Virgil Films & Entertainment. It was released internationally in 2018 by Monarch Films. It won Best Story in a Feature Film at the Buffalo Niagara Film Festival and Best Screenplay at the Macabre Faire Film Festival.

In 2018, Smith created the documentary TV series War Heroes, hosted by author and former U.S. Army Ranger Kris Paronto. Film and television producer Glenn Nevola helped finance the series, and serves as executive producer alongside Smith and his fiancée Mandy Del Rio. The series focuses on the lives of American soldiers. The pilot episode, which premiered at sold-out screenings in Las Vegas and New Jersey, profiles Sergeant Ryan E. Doltz, who died in the line of duty in Baghdad in June 2004.

On September 10, 2021, Newsmax premiered the documentary 9/11: The Day That Shook The World, which Smith directed and co-executive produced with Del Rio. Coinciding with the twentieth anniversary of the September 11 attacks, the film relates accounts of that day from surviving firefighters, relatives of those who lost their lives, and former New York City officials who lived through the attacks, including Mayor Rudolph Giuliani, FDNY Tom Von Essen, NYPD Bernard Kerik, and Congressman Peter T. King.

== Personal life ==
As of September 2021, Smith is engaged to Mandy Del Rio, who has collaborated with him on his projects. She also hosts The Indie Lounge on TV34 in Montclair, New Jersey. Smith has a daughter named Megan Cruz, who works with him on his projects.
