= Sparta, New Jersey =

Township in Sussex County, New Jersey, US

- Township
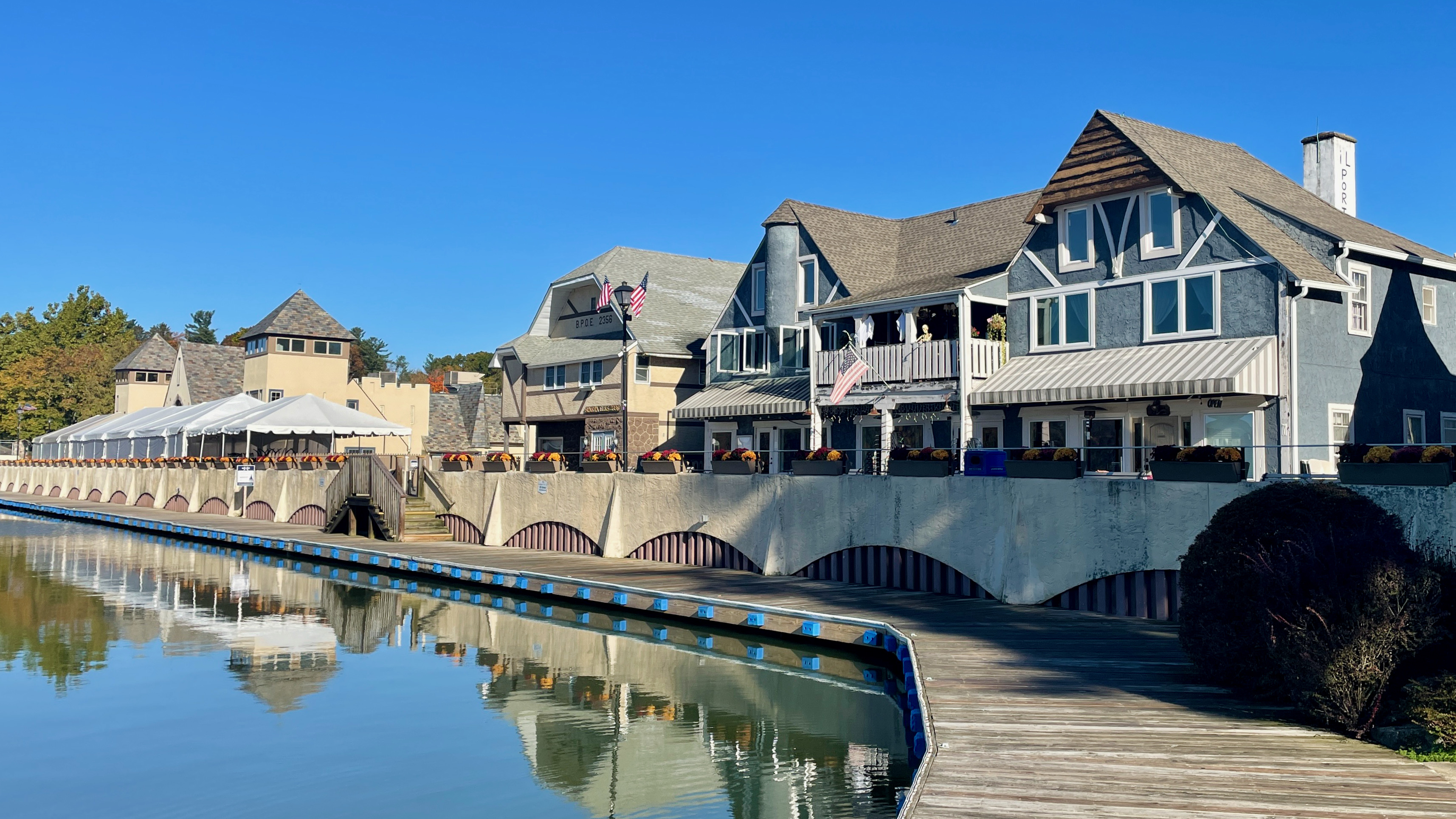
- Lake Mohawk Boardwalk

- Seal

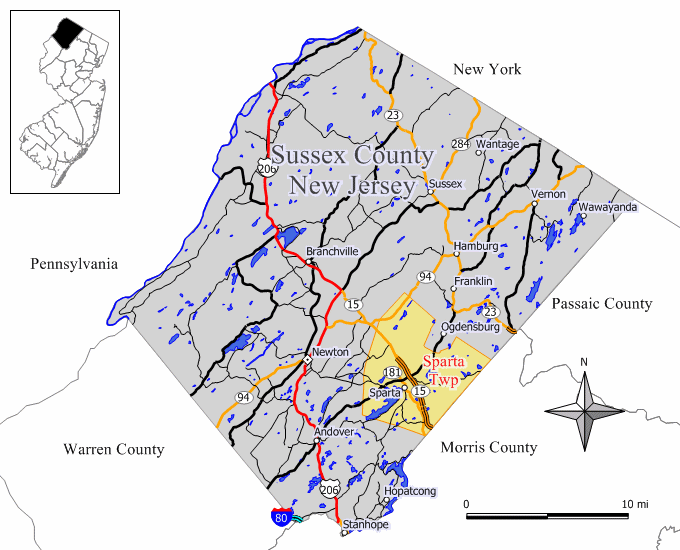
- Location of Sparta in Sussex County highlighted in yellow (right). Inset map: Location of Sussex County in New Jersey highlighted in black (left).

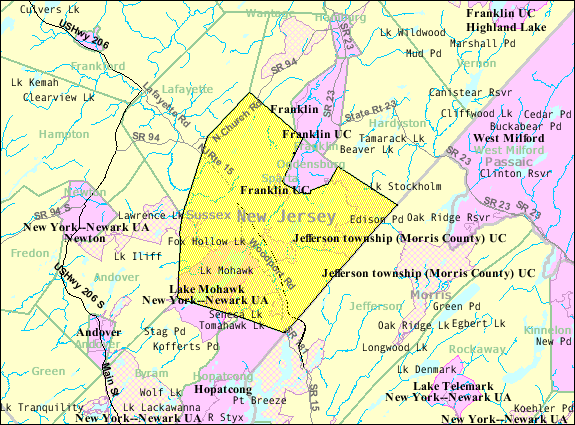
- Census Bureau map of Sparta, New Jersey

- Location in Sussex County Location in New Jersey Location in the United States
- Coordinates: 41.052283°N 74.627906°W
- Country: United States
- State: New Jersey
- County: Sussex
- Incorporated: April 14, 1845

Government
  - Type: Faulkner Act (council–manager)
  - Body: Township Council
  - Mayor: Dean Blumetti (term ends December 31, 2026)
  - Municipal clerk: Roxanne Landy

Area
  - Total: 38.80 sq mi (100.50 km^{2})
  - Land: 36.79 sq mi (95.28 km^{2})
  - Water: 2.02 sq mi (5.22 km^{2}) 5.20%
  - Rank: 60th of 565 in state 5th of 24 in county
- Elevation: 620 ft (190 m)

Population (2020)
  - Total: 19,600
  - Estimate (2023): 20,195
  - Rank: 141st of 565 in state 2nd of 24 in county
  - Density: 532.8/sq mi (205.7/km^{2})
  - Rank: 440th of 565 in state 9th of 24 in county
- Time zone: UTC−05:00 (Eastern (EST))
  - Summer (DST): UTC−04:00 (Eastern (EDT))
- ZIP Code: 07871
- Area code: 973 exchanges: 726, 729
- FIPS code: 3403769690
- GNIS feature ID: 0882265
- Website: www.spartanj.org

Sparta is a township in Sussex County in the U.S. state of New Jersey. As of the 2020 United States census, the township's population was 19,600, a decrease of 122 (−0.6%) from the 2010 census count of 19,722, which in turn reflected an increase of 1,642 (+9.1%) from the 18,080 counted in the 2000 census.

Sparta was organized as a township by an act of the New Jersey Legislature on April 14, 1845, from portions of Byram Township, Frankford Township, Hardyston Township and (the now-defunct) Newton Township. The township was named after the existing community of Sparta, which had been settled and named years before, the name likely coming from Sparta, Greece. Ogdensburg borough was incorporated on February 26, 1914, from portions of Sparta Township.

The township was listed as the safest place in New Jersey as well as the seventh safest municipality in the nation according to a 2022 crime statistic compilation from Safewise.com.

== History ==
=== Overview ===
Sparta was originally inhabited by Lenape Native Americans. In the 1750s, Dutch explorers discovered red ores in the area and attempted to mine copper. No permanent settlers arrived until 1778, when Robert Ogden and his wife built their home and constructed an iron forge on lands he had acquired and "called their house and farm Sparta." The first public building in Sparta was the Presbyterian Church which was incorporated in 1786. Schools were established in Ogdensburg by 1806 and in Sparta by 1812.

Iron, zinc, and limestone supported a mining industry for over 100 years, but today the mining operations have ceased and the township is now a residential community served by retail, professional, and service small businesses. According to the 2000 census, 65% of Sparta workers commute to jobs outside of the county.

=== Mining industry ===
==== Iron ====
Robert Ogden settled in 1778 near the present town of Ogdensburg and built an iron forge, utilizing local ore from his Ogden Mine on Sparta Mountain. The Horseshoe mine was opened in 1772 by the Englishmen Spargo and Harvey who shipped ore by horse and mule to the forges at Sparta and Hopewell. It wasn't until 1868 that the Ogden Mine Railroad began operations and made it economical to ship zinc and iron ore to Nolan's Point on Lake Hopatcong where the Morris Canal had a marine terminal that could ship ore to Newark. In 1872, the New Jersey Midland Railroad (later known as the New York, Susquehanna & Western) extended to Ogdensburg and captured the zinc ore traffic.

In 1836, Henry Decker, along with Nelson Hunt and Lewis Sherman, began the manufacture of anchors at their forges in Sparta. Their success led to a small industry of forging anchors in Sparta, but by the end of the Civil War the forge industry in Sparta had come to an end.

In 1889, Thomas Edison invested $3.5 million in his Edison Ore-Milling Company to build iron operations on 2,500 acres (10 km^{2}) of Sparta Mountain. Edison hoped to concentrate the mountain's vast quantities of low-grade ore and supply East Coast mills with raw material. At its peak Edison's operation employed 500 people, but after a 10-year effort he abandoned his attempt to compete with more economical ores from Minnesota's Mesabi Iron Range. The availability of the cheap Minnesota ores put an end to iron mining in Sparta.

==== Zinc ====
In 1848 the New Jersey Zinc Company began operations at Sterling Hill. Earlier attempts to obtain iron from the mineral rich ore of the Sterling Hill failed because of manganese contamination, but zinc was recoverable and the ores at Sterling Hill were rich with it.

In 1856 the Passaic Zinc Company started operations at the Sterling Hill Mine and constructed large ore crushers, shipping the ores to the company's plant in Jersey City.

By 1868, both iron and zinc operations were in progress at Sterling Hill, but the numerous companies and claims were embroiled in continuous legal battles, the largest of which was a 12-year dispute between the New Jersey Zinc Company and the Franklin Iron Company over rights to mixed ores, each company having purchased the right to mine zinc and iron, respectively. In 1880, the Franklin Iron Company acquired the New Jersey Zinc Company's operations at Sterling Hill mine, ending the dispute. Large scale operations began in 1897 when the claims were consolidated under the New Jersey Zinc Company and by 1900 its mill was processing 1,500 tons of ore daily.

Zinc operations continued until 1986 when the Sterling Hill mine ceased operation. The Sterling Hill mine site is currently occupied by the Sterling Hill Mining Museum and is open to the public for tours.

==== Limestone ====
After closing his iron operations, Thomas Edison recouped his losses by opening a quarry called Limecrest near Sparta in 1919. The lime quarry fed Edison's Portland cement operations, and was in continuous operation under various owners for more than 80 years until it closed in 2003. During the years of its operation the limestone quarry was an important source of employment and tax revenue for Sparta. Limestone is no longer mined, but a limited amount of granite continues to be quarried by a handful of employees.

=== Tourism ===
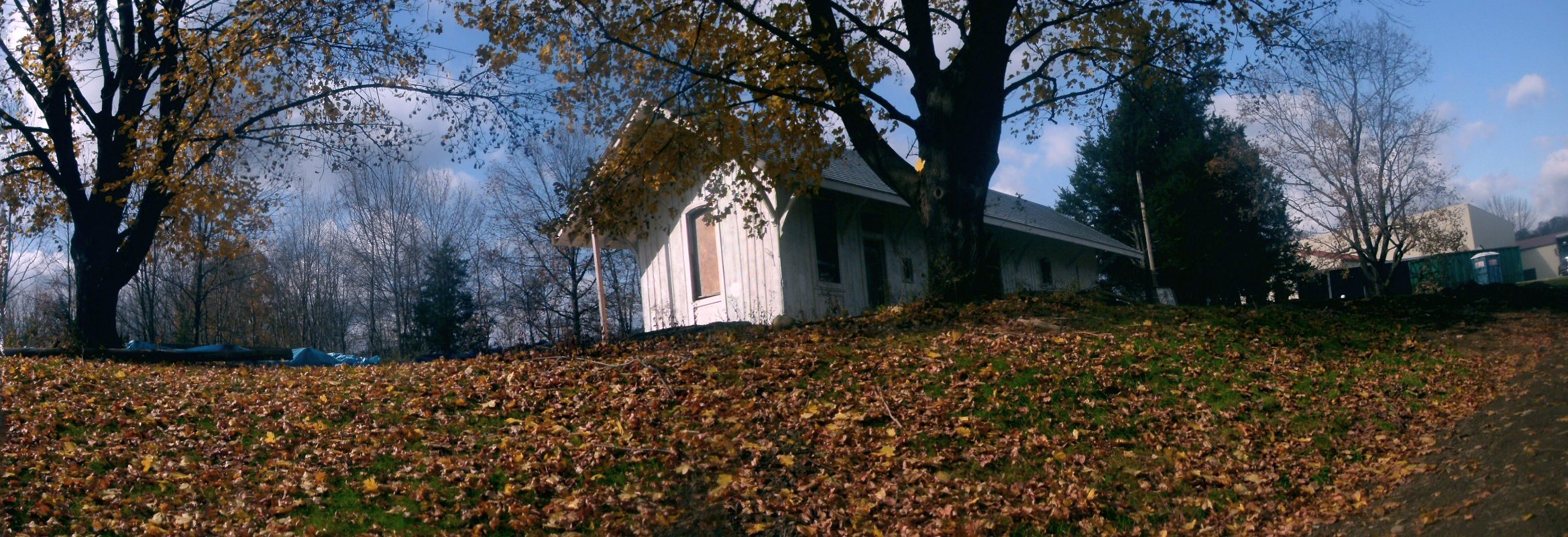
The former New York, Susquehanna and Western Railroad station in Sparta, as viewed from a nearby business in November 2011. The station depot burned in an early morning fire on September 3, 2012.

The New Jersey Midland Railroad opened to Ogdensburg in 1872 for zinc ore traffic, but in 1882 the line was extended to Stroudsburg, Pennsylvania and a station was built at Sparta, giving tourists easy access to the many boarding houses that served summer residents from the cities. Passenger service ended in 1935, but by then Sparta was well established as a summer destination. In 1926, the Arthur D. Crane Company along with developer and designer Herbert L. Closs constructed a 600-foot (180 m) dam across the Wallkill River to form 300-acre (1.2 km^{2}) Lake Mohawk in 1928. The private resort community created by the Crane Company consisted primarily of summer homes, but the homes began to be winterized in the 1940s and the current membership of 2,600 families are largely year-round residents.

== Geography ==
The township borders the municipalities of Andover Township, Byram Township, Franklin Borough, Hardyston Township, Hopatcong Borough, Lafayette Township and Ogdensburg, New Jersey Ogdensburg Borough in Sussex County; and Jefferson Township in Morris County.

According to the United States Census Bureau, the township had a total area of 38.80 square miles (100.50 km^{2}), including 36.79 square miles (95.28 km^{2}) of land and 2.02 square miles (5.22 km^{2}) of water (5.20%).

== Unincorporated communities ==
Unincorporated communities, localities and place names located partially or completely within the township include Ackerson, Edison, Hopewell, Houses Corner, Lake Mohawk, Monroe, Sparta Junction, Sussex Mills, Upper Mohawk and Woodruffs Gap.

=== Lake Mohawk ===
Lake Mohawk (with 8,092 out of the CDP's total 2010 Census population of 9,916 in the township) is an unincorporated community and census-designated place (CDP) split between Byram Township and Sparta.

=== Sparta Junction ===
Sparta Junction was where the tracks of the New York, Susquehanna and Western Railroad and the Lehigh and Hudson River Railway crossed, near the western boundary of Sparta. A railroad telegraph office and a train order station, that controlled train signalling semaphores, was located there. It is located at 41.06426°N 74.67127°W.

== Geology ==
Sparta is in the Highlands which is comprised of igneous and metamorphic rock. Folding and faulting occurred when a continent struck the North American Plate. This is what created the mountains through Sparta and northwards. The Wisconsin Glacier created all the lakes and streams. The Franklin Marble goes through the township from Lime Crest Quarry to the New York line.

== Demographics ==
Historical population
Census	Pop.	Note	%±
1850	1,919		—
1860	2,062		7.5%
1870	2,032		−1.5%
1880	2,274		11.9%
1890	1,724		−24.2%
1900	2,070		20.1%
1910	1,579		−23.7%
1920	1,017		−35.6%
1930	1,316		29.4%
1940	1,729		31.4%
1950	3,021		74.7%
1960	6,717		122.3%
1970	10,819		61.1%
1980	13,333		23.2%
1990	15,157		13.7%
2000	18,080		19.3%
2010	19,722		9.1%
2020	19,600		−0.6%
2023 (est.)	20,195		3.0%
Population sources: 1850–1920; 1850–1870 1850 1870; 1880–1890 1890–1910 1910–1930; 1940–2000 2000; 2010 2020 * = Lost territory in previous decade.

Sparta has been noted for the high number of pilots and their families who settle in the area. In his 1994 book The Airport: Terminal Nights and Runway Days at John F. Kennedy International, James Kaplan describes the home township of an interviewee as "thickly populated, for no particular reason, with pilots, many of whom do their flying out of Kennedy. The view out [the pilot's] picture window is of trees ... The lights and noise of Manhattan, fifty miles distant, attract flight attendants, single people mostly. Pilots like the woods."

=== 2010 census ===
The 2010 United States census counted 19,722 people, 6,868 households, and 5,453 families in the township. The population density was 533.9 per square mile (206.1/km^{2}). There were 7,423 housing units at an average density of 200.9 per square mile (77.6/km^{2}). The racial makeup was 94.15% (18,569) White, 1.00% (198) Black or African American, 0.11% (22) Native American, 2.49% (491) Asian, 0.02% (4) Pacific Islander, 0.70% (139) from other races, and 1.52% (299) from two or more races. Hispanic or Latino of any race were 5.34% (1,054) of the population.

Of the 6,868 households, 41.8% had children under the age of 18; 69.6% were married couples living together; 6.9% had a female householder with no husband present and 20.6% were non-families. Of all households, 17.4% were made up of individuals and 8.0% had someone living alone who was 65 years of age or older. The average household size was 2.87 and the average family size was 3.27.

28.9% of the population were under the age of 18, 6.1% from 18 to 24, 21.5% from 25 to 44, 32.4% from 45 to 64, and 11.1% who were 65 years of age or older. The median age was 41.5 years. For every 100 females, the population had 96.6 males. For every 100 females ages 18 and older there were 95.1 males.

The Census Bureau's 2006–2010 American Community Survey showed that (in 2010 inflation-adjusted dollars) median household income was $112,699 (with a margin of error of +/− $6,658) and the median family income was $127,669 (+/− $8,981). Males had a median income of $89,118 (+/− $5,949) versus $60,590 (+/− $5,416) for females. The per capita income for the borough was $50,115 (+/− $3,064). About 2.3% of families and 3.0% of the population were below the poverty line, including 3.4% of those under age 18 and 5.5% of those age 65 or over.

=== 2000 census ===
As of the 2000 United States census there were 18,080 people, 6,225 households, and 5,029 families residing in the township. The population density was 483.5 inhabitants per square mile (186.7/km^{2}). There were 6,590 housing units at an average density of 176.2 per square mile (68.0/km^{2}). The racial makeup of the township was 96.7% White, 0.3% African American, 0.1% Native American, 1.4% Asian, 0.03% Pacific Islander, 0.45% from other races, and 1.09% from two or more races. Hispanic or Latino of any race were 2.54% of the population.

There were 6,225 households, out of which 44.6% had children under the age of 18 living with them, 72.9% were married couples living together, 5.9% had a female householder with no husband present, and 19.2% were non-families. 16.1% of all households were made up of individuals, and 7.2% had someone living alone who was 65 years of age or older. The average household size was 2.90 and the average family size was 3.28.

In the township the population was spread out, with 30.6% under the age of 18, 4.5% from 18 to 24, 30.0% from 25 to 44, 26.6% from 45 to 64, and 8.2% who were 65 years of age or older. The median age was 38 years. For every 100 females, there were 97.3 males. For every 100 females age 18 and over, there were 94.4 males.

The median income for a household in the township was $89,835, and the median income for a family was $100,658. Males had a median income of $74,293 versus $39,349 for females. The per capita income for the township was $36,910. About 1.0% of families and 1.5% of the population were below the poverty line, including 1.6% of those under age 18 and 2.1% of those age 65 or over.

== Economy ==
Sparta is home to many small businesses. Lake Mohawk houses many boutiques and gift shops that cater to a wide variety of shoppers. As well as these smaller businesses, Sparta home to multiple family-owned pizzerias and delis.

Rockaway Townsquare is located about 15 minutes away from Sparta and allows residents to find a wider variety of shops.

== Government ==
=== Local government ===
Sparta is governed within the Faulkner Act, formally known as the Optional Municipal Charter Law, under the Council-Manager (Plan B) form of municipal government, implemented based on the recommendations of a Charter Study Commission as of July 1, 1960. The township is one of 42 municipalities (of the 564) statewide governed under this form. The governing body is comprised of a five-member Township Council whose members are elected at-large on a non-partisan basis for staggered four-year terms of office, with either two or three seats coming up for election in even-numbered years as part of the November general election. The council chooses a Mayor and Deputy Mayor from among themselves to serve one-year terms of office. The Township Council has the responsibility for all legislative matters.

The Council's responsibilities include enacting ordinances and resolutions, establishing policies, preparing the annual budget with the assistance of the Township Manager and the Treasurer, and levying taxes. Additionally, the Council makes appointments to both the policy and decision-making boards and various advisory committees in accordance with general law and Township ordinances and resolutions.

The council voted to shift its municipal elections from May to November, and voters approved a 2011 referendum that ended a requirement that a runoff election be held in June in the event that no candidate received a majority of votes in the May council election. The first election in which the candidates receiving the most votes won office was held in November 2012.

As of 2024, members of the Sparta Township Council are Mayor Neill Clark (term on the council ends December 31, 2026; term as mayor ends 2024), Deputy Mayor Dean Blumetti (term on council ends 2026; term as deputy mayor ends 2024), Daniel Chiariello (2026), Josh Hertzberg (2024) and Christine Quinn (2024).

In 2018, the township had an average property tax bill of $12,044, the highest in the county, compared to an average bill of $8,767 statewide.

=== Federal, state, and county representation ===
Sparta Township is located in the 7th Congressional District and is part of New Jersey's 24th state legislative district.

Prior to the 2010 Census, Sparta Township had been split between the 5th Congressional District and the 11th Congressional District, a change made by the New Jersey Redistricting Commission that took effect in January 2013, based on the results of the November 2012 general elections.

For the 119th United States Congress, New Jersey's 7th congressional district is represented by Thomas Kean Jr. (R, Westfield). New Jersey is represented in the United States Senate by Democrats Cory Booker (Newark, term ends 2027) and Andy Kim (Moorestown, term ends 2031).

For the 2026–2027 session, the 24th legislative district of the New Jersey Legislature is represented in the State Senate by Parker Space (R, Wantage Township) and in the General Assembly by Dawn Fantasia (R, Franklin) and Mike Inganamort (R, Chester Township).

Sussex County is governed by a Board of County Commissioners whose five members are elected at-large in partisan elections on a staggered basis, with either one or two seats coming up for election each year. At an annual reorganization meeting held in the beginning of January, the board selects a Commissioner Director and Deputy Director from among its members, with day-to-day supervision of the operation of the county delegated to a County Administrator. As of 2025, Sussex County's Commissioners are Director Jill Space (R, Wantage Township, 2025), Deputy Director Chris Carney (R, Frankford Township, 2027), Jack DeGroot (R, Sussex, 2026), William Hayden (I, Branchville, 2025) and Alan Henderson (R, Lafayette Township, 2027).

Constitutional officers elected on a countywide basis are Clerk Jeffrey M. Parrott (R, Wantage Township, 2026), Sheriff Michael F. Strada (R, Hampton Township, 2025) and Surrogate Gary R. Chiusano (R, Frankford Township, 2028).

=== Politics ===
As of March 2011, there were a total of 13,647 registered voters in Sparta Township, of which 2,393 (17.5% vs. 16.5% countywide) were registered as Democrats, 4,854 (35.6% vs. 39.3%) were registered as Republicans and 6,387 (46.8% vs. 44.1%) were registered as Unaffiliated. There were 13 voters registered as Libertarians or Greens. Among the township's 2010 Census population, 69.2% (vs. 65.8% in Sussex County) were registered to vote, including 97.3% of those ages 18 and over (vs. 86.5% countywide).

Gubernatorial election results for Sparta
Year	Republican		Democratic		Third party(ies)	
Year	No.	%	No.	%	No.	%
2025	5,344	55.45%	4,249	44.09%	45	0.47%
2021	4,950	63.19%	2,803	35.78%	80	1.02%
2017	3,368	57.29%	2,326	39.56%	185	3.15%
2013	4,431	72.81%	1,496	24.58%	159	2.61%
2009	4,694	65.49%	1,844	25.73%	630	8.79%
2005	4,014	64.72%	1,977	31.88%	211	3.40%

In the 2012 presidential election, Republican Mitt Romney received 6,370 votes (61.6% vs. 59.4% countywide), ahead of Democrat Barack Obama with 3,747 votes (36.3% vs. 38.2%) and other candidates with 188 votes (1.8% vs. 2.1%), among the 10,335 ballots cast by the township's 14,177 registered voters, for a turnout of 72.9% (vs. 68.3% in Sussex County). In the 2008 presidential election, Republican John McCain received 6,462 votes (59.9% vs. 59.2% countywide), ahead of Democrat Barack Obama with 4,171 votes (38.7% vs. 38.7%) and other candidates with 103 votes (1.0% vs. 1.5%), among the 10,781 ballots cast by the township's 13,490 registered voters, for a turnout of 79.9% (vs. 76.9% in Sussex County). In the 2004 presidential election, Republican George W. Bush received 6,622 votes (65.8% vs. 63.9% countywide), ahead of Democrat John Kerry with 3,311 votes (32.9% vs. 34.4%) and other candidates with 102 votes (1.0% vs. 1.3%), among the 10,070 ballots cast by the township's 12,537 registered voters, for a turnout of 80.3% (vs. 77.7% in the whole county).

United States presidential election results for Sparta 2024 2020 2016 2012 2008 2004
Year	Republican		Democratic		Third party(ies)	
Year	No.	%	No.	%	No.	%
2024	6,939	56.10%	5,192	41.98%	237	1.92%
2020	6,884	53.65%	5,716	44.55%	231	1.80%
2016	6,325	58.59%	4,061	37.62%	410	3.80%
2012	6,370	61.81%	3,747	36.36%	188	1.82%
2008	6,462	60.19%	4,171	38.85%	103	0.96%
2004	6,622	65.99%	3,311	32.99%	102	1.02%

In the 2013 gubernatorial election, Republican Chris Christie received 72.8% of the vote (4,431 cast), ahead of Democrat Barbara Buono with 24.6% (1,496 votes), and other candidates with 2.6% (159 votes), among the 6,140 ballots cast by the township's 14,360 registered voters (54 ballots were spoiled), for a turnout of 42.8%. In the 2009 gubernatorial election, Republican Chris Christie received 4,694 votes (65.2% vs. 63.3% countywide), ahead of Democrat Jon Corzine with 1,844 votes (25.6% vs. 25.7%), Independent Chris Daggett with 593 votes (8.2% vs. 9.1%) and other candidates with 37 votes (0.5% vs. 1.3%), among the 7,202 ballots cast by the township's 13,308 registered voters, yielding a 54.1% turnout (vs. 52.3% in the county).

United States Senate election results for Sparta1
Year	Republican		Democratic		Third party(ies)	
Year	No.	%	No.	%	No.	%
2024	6,796	56.24%	4,994	41.32%	295	2.44%
2018	5,451	58.89%	3,364	36.34%	441	4.76%
2012	6,027	60.31%	3,608	36.11%	358	3.58%
2006	3,793	62.60%	2,090	34.49%	176	2.90%

United States Senate election results for Sparta2
Year	Republican		Democratic		Third party(ies)	
Year	No.	%	No.	%	No.	%
2020	7,004	55.42%	5,369	42.48%	266	2.10%
2014	3,226	61.52%	1,884	35.93%	134	2.56%
2013	2,546	63.63%	1,411	35.27%	44	1.10%
2008	6,348	61.10%	3,717	35.77%	325	3.13%

== Education ==
=== Public schools ===
The Sparta Township Public School District serves students in public school from pre-kindergarten through twelfth grade. As of the 2021–22 school year, the district, comprised of five schools, had an enrollment of 3,236 students and 290.6 classroom teachers (on an FTE basis), for a student–teacher ratio of 11.1:1. Schools in the district (with 2021–22 enrollment data from the National Center for Education Statistics) are Alpine Elementary School with 725 students in grades PreK-2, Mohawk Avenue School with 231 students in grade 3, Helen Morgan School with 476 students in grades 4-5, Sparta Middle School with 719 students in grades 6-8, Sparta High School with 1,065 students in grades 9-12.

The Sparta Education Foundation was founded in 2006 to help with budgetary issues in the Sparta school district and to bring extra funds to the public school district from concerned private citizens and groups. In 2009, the Foundation provided technology money for SMART boards and projectors in Alpine and Helen Morgan schools. The Board of Education office is located in the Mohawk Avenue School. Matthew L. Beck is the Superintendent of Schools.

=== Specialized and charter schools ===
Sparta is also home to Sussex County Technical School, a county-wide technical high school.

Sussex Charter School for Technology serves grades 6-8, and is open to students from across the state, with preference given to application to students from Sparta.

=== Private schools ===
The Roman Catholic Diocese of Paterson is responsible for Rev. George A. Brown Elementary for 1st-5th, Pope John XXIII Middle School for 6th-8th, and Pope John XXIII High School for 9th-12th.

Sparta is home of Hilltop Country Day School, a private school for students in kindergarten through eighth grade.

Veritas Christian Academy, a small private school, educates students in grades 9-12.

== Transportation ==
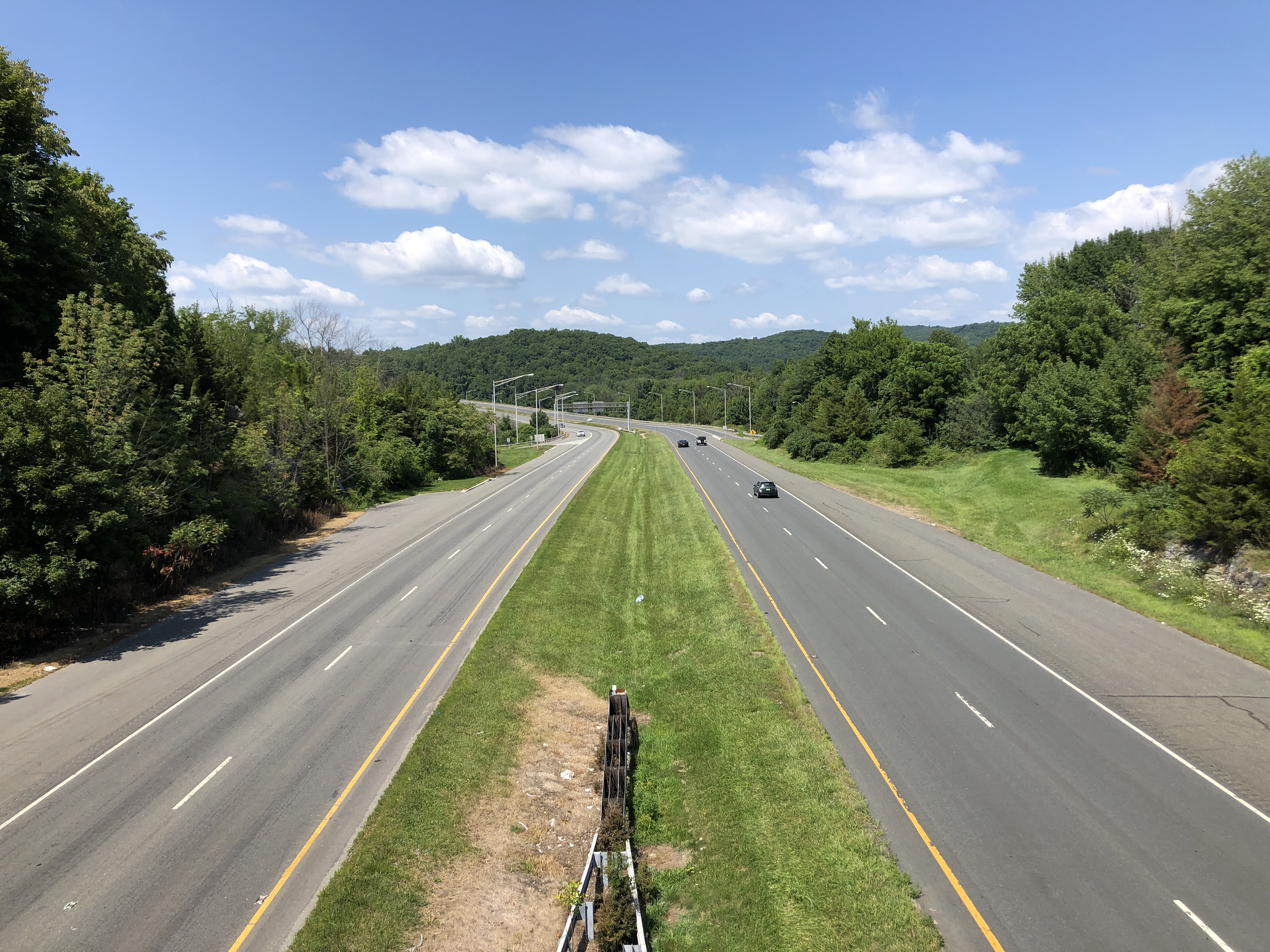
Route 15 northbound in Sparta Township

=== Roads and highways ===
As of May 2010, the township had a total of 132.81 miles (213.74 km) of roadways, of which 97.07 miles (156.22 km) were maintained by the municipality, 20.05 miles (32.27 km) by Sussex County and 15.69 miles (25.25 km) by the New Jersey Department of Transportation.

Route 15 is the primary highway serving Sparta Township. Much of the original stretch of this highway within Sparta has been bypassed by a freeway, with the old route now designated Route 181. Route 94 and County Route 517 also pass through the township.

=== Public transportation ===
Sparta is served by the Skylands Connect bus, which provides service to Newton, Hamburg and Sussex. Lakeland Bus Lines provides commuter service to the Port Authority Bus Terminal in Midtown Manhattan from the Sparta police station and Blue Heron Road park and rides on the Route 80 route.

== Emergency services ==
=== Police ===
The Sparta Police Department is headquartered in the Municipal Building. The department is led by the Chief of Police Neil Spidaletto. The department has 10 Ford Explorers. Sparta Dispatch located in Sparta Police Headquarters is staffed 24/7 by trained Telecommunicators and Emergency Medical Dispatchers. Sparta Dispatch handles Police, Fire and Emergency Medical Dispatch for the towns of Sparta, Franklin, Ogdensburg and Stanhope.

=== Emergency Medical Services ===
The Sparta Ambulance Squad was founded on July 11, 1947, by the Sparta VFW post 7248. The squad is staffed by a combination of volunteers and paid EMTs. During weekdays, from 6 a.m. to 6 p.m., ambulances are staffed by two paid EMTs. From 6 p.m. to 6 a.m. and all day on weekends, Volunteer crews are on call to handle emergencies. If a crew is not found in Sparta, mutual aid agreements exist with area volunteer and hospital based EMS agencies. The squad and its more than 60 members operate three ambulances (4191, 4192, 4193), an off-road utility vehicle, and an Emergency Response Unit (4195). Sparta Ambulance Squad's headquarters is located at 14 Sparta Avenue. In 2013, the squad responded to 1,425 calls.

=== Fire ===
The Sparta Fire Department serves the township, providing firefighting services along with vehicle extrication and HazMat services. The department's headquarters is located at 141 Woodport Road, with substations on Glen Road and Sparta Stanhope Road. It is an all-volunteer fire department.

== Notable people ==
People who were born in, residents of, or otherwise closely associated with Sparta include:

- Mary Vail Andress (1883–1964), banker who was a World War I relief worker in France
- Greg Baty (born 1964), former NFL player
- Mike Budnik (born 1974), former professional inline skater and mixed martial arts fighter
- Cassidy, lead singer for the band Antigone Rising from 1999 through 2008
- Tom Caltabiano, writer and stand-up comedian, who directed and co-starred in the documentary 95 Miles to Go with longtime friend Ray Romano
- Frank Dolce (born 1996), actor who appeared in Sons of Tucson on television and on Broadway in the role of Michael in Billy Elliot the Musical
- Sarah Escobar (born 2002), skier who represented Ecuador at the 2022 Winter Olympics
- Charles Joseph Fletcher (1922–2011), inventor and the owner and chief executive of an aeronautical equipment company Technology General Corporation
- Archimedes Giacomantonio (1906–1988), sculptor who was best known for his busts of noted figures
- Bob Gunderman (1934–2024), NFL football player for the Pittsburgh Steelers
- Frank Herbert (1931–2018), politician who served in the New Jersey Senate and the Bergen County Board of Chosen Freeholders
- Chris Jent (born 1970), former NBA basketball player and current coach
- F. Ross Johnson (1931–2016), Canadian businessman and former CEO of RJR Nabisco
- Jordan Lawlor (born 1992), musician, who has toured with the band M83
- Jeff Lenosky (born 1971), US National Mountain Bike Champion and world record holder
- Simon J. Levien (born 2000), journalist who exposed the presence of the Ku Klux Klan on Harvard's campus
- Sean Maguire (born 1994), football quarterback
- Wendy Mass (born 1967), author
- Dan Miller (born 1981), mixed martial artist who is a UFC Contender, CFFC Middleweight Champion and IFL Middleweight Champion
- Jim Miller (born 1984), mixed martial artist who is a UFC Contender, CFFC Lightweight Champion and Reality Fighting Featherweight Champion
- Troy Murphy (born 1980), NBA basketball player
- Sylvia Pressler (1934–2010), New Jersey court judge whose rulings included one allowing girls to participate in Little League Baseball
- Tom Raney, comics artist known for his work on Uncanny X-Men and The Outsiders
- John Anthony Rodriguez (born 2000), musician, who performs as "54 Ultra" and is best known for his smooth, Latin soul-influenced vocals
- J. Allyn Rosser (born 1957), poet
- Jack Thomas Smith (born 1969), horror filmmaker
- Tim Sweeney (born 1980), former professional baseball player who became a sports agent and participated in The Amazing Race 23
- Arthur Tipton (1882–1942), football player and United States Army officer
- Russ Van Atta (1906–1986), former Major League Baseball pitcher for the New York Yankees and the Saint Louis Browns who served as Sheriff of Sussex County and as a county freeholder
- Jesse James West (born 2000), YouTuber and bodybuilder
- Harry Wright (1919–1993), football player and coach who played for the New York Giants and served as the mayor of the township

== Sources ==
- Kaplan, James (1994). The Airport: Terminal Nights and Runway Days at John F. Kennedy International. New York: William Morrow and Company.
- McCabe, Wayne T.; Gordon, Kate (1996). A Penny A View...An Album of Postcard Views...Sparta, N.J. Newton, New Jersey: Historic Preservation Alternatives.
- Pierson, Duane (1981). Images of Sparta. Newton, New Jersey: Minisink Press.
- Snell, James P. (1881). History of Sussex & Warren Counties, New Jersey with Illustrations and Biographical Sketches of its Prominent Men and Pioneers. Philadelphia, PA: Everts & Peck.
- Truran, William R. (2005). Sparta, NJ: Head of the Wallkill. Sparta, New Jersey: Trupower Press.
