= Chris Jent =

American basketball player and coach (born 1970)

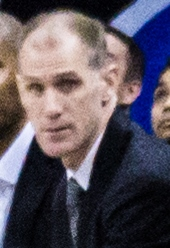
- Jent in 2013

New York Knicks
- Title: Associate head coach
- League: NBA

Personal information
- Born: January 11, 1970 (age 56) Orange, California, U.S.
- Listed height: 6 ft 7 in (2.01 m)
- Listed weight: 220 lb (100 kg)

Career information
- High school: Sparta (Sparta, New Jersey)
- College: Ohio State (1988–1992)
- NBA draft: 1992: undrafted
- Playing career: 1992–2001
- Position: Small forward
- Number: 21, 7
- Coaching career: 2003–present

Career history

Playing
- 1992–1993: Rapid City Thrillers
- 1993: Joventut Badalona
- 1993–1994: Columbus Horizon
- 1994: Houston Rockets
- 1994–1995: Rapid City Thrillers
- 1995: North Melbourne Giants
- 1995: Connecticut Pride
- 1995–1996: Napoli
- 1997: New York Knicks
- 1997: Napoli
- 1997: Atlantic City Seagulls
- 1997–1998: Reggiana
- 1998–1999: Andrea Costa Imola
- 1999–2000: Panionios
- 2000–2001: Reggiana
- 2001–2002: Pavia

Coaching
- 2003–2004: Philadelphia 76ers (assistant)
- 2004–2005: Orlando Magic (assistant)
- 2005: Orlando Magic (interim)
- 2006–2011: Cleveland Cavaliers (assistant)
- 2011–2013: Ohio State (assistant)
- 2013–2014: Sacramento Kings (assistant)
- 2015–2016: Bakersfield Jam
- 2016–2017: Ohio State (assistant)
- 2017–2022: Atlanta Hawks (assistant)
- 2022–2024: Los Angeles Lakers (assistant)
- 2024–2025: Charlotte Hornets (assistant)
- 2025–present: New York Knicks (associate HC)

Career highlights
- As player: NBA champion (1994); All-NBL Third Team (1995); CBA All-Rookie First Team (1993); 2× Fourth-team Parade All-American (1987, 1988); As assistant coach: NBA champion (2026); 2× NBA Cup champion (2023, 2025); Big Ten tournament champion (2013)

Career NBA statistics
- Points: 37 (6.2 ppg)
- Rebounds: 16 (2.7 rpg)
- Assists: 8 (1.3 apg)
- Stats at NBA.com
- Stats at Basketball Reference
Medals
Men's basketball
Representing United States
FIBA Americas Championship
Gold medal – first place	1993 San Juan	Team competition

Christopher Matthew Jent (born January 11, 1970) is an American basketball coach and former player who serves as the associate head coach for the New York Knicks of the National Basketball Association (NBA). He was formerly the head coach of the Bakersfield Jam of the NBA Development League, and had a stint as an assistant coach at the Los Angeles Lakers as well.

== Early life and college career ==
Jent was born in Orange, California and grew up in Sparta, New Jersey. After attending high school at Sparta High School (New Jersey), he played college basketball for the Ohio State Buckeyes, leaving in 1992 after four seasons.

== Professional playing career ==
Undrafted in the 1992 NBA draft, Jent was drafted in the fourth round (50th overall) in the 1992 CBA draft. Jent began his professional career with CBA teams Rapid City Thrillers and Columbus Horizon. He was selected to the CBA All-Rookie First Team in 1993.

He had a brief career in the NBA, playing three games each for the Houston Rockets (winning a championship ring in 1994) and New York Knicks (1996–97). He played in 11 playoff games in 1994, thus giving him the rare distinction of having played in more career playoff-games than regular-season games in the NBA. In between his stints with the Rockets and the Knicks, he played with the Australian NBL's North Melbourne Giants in 1995 and also played in Italy, Spain and Greece.

== Coaching career ==
=== Philadelphia 76ers (2003–2004) ===
Jent was an assistant coach for the Philadelphia 76ers in the 2003–04 season.

=== Orlando Magic (2004–2005) ===
The next season, Jent worked in the same capacity with the Orlando Magic, and was appointed interim head coach for the final 18 games of the 2004–05 season (going 5–13), after Johnny Davis was fired. At the start of the next season he was replaced by Brian Hill.

=== Cleveland Cavaliers (2006–2011) ===
Beginning in November 2006, Jent took on the role of Assistant Coach/Director of Player Development with the Cleveland Cavaliers. He served as LeBron James' personal shooting coach while James was on the team.

=== Ohio State (2011–2013) ===
On June 29, 2011, Ohio State head basketball coach Thad Matta introduced Jent as an assistant coach for the Buckeyes.

=== Sacramento Kings (2013–2014) ===
On June 10, 2013, Jent became an assistant coach with the Sacramento Kings. He was relieved of his duty on December 16, 2014.

=== Bakersfield Jam (2015–2016) ===
Jent would later on be the newest head coach for the Bakersfield Jam in 2015 after their former head coach ended up accepting an assistant coach/leading player development position for the Phoenix Suns.

=== Return to Ohio State (2016–2017) ===
Jent returned to Ohio State as an assistant following the 2015–16 season.

=== Atlanta Hawks (2017–2022) ===
For the 2017–18 season, Jent was hired as an assistant coach with the Atlanta Hawks.

=== Los Angeles Lakers (2022–2024) ===
On September 27, 2022, Jent was hired to serve as an assistant coach for the Los Angeles Lakers.

=== Charlotte Hornets (2024–2025) ===
Jent was hired as an assistant coach on Charles Lee's staff for the Charlotte Hornets in the 2024 offeason.

In 2025, Jent coached the Hornets in the 2025 NBA Summer League; the team went 6-0 and won the championship over the Sacramento Kings, 83-78.

=== New York Knicks (2025–present) ===
On August 8, 2025, the New York Knicks hired Jent to serve as the team's associate head coach under head coach Mike Brown.

== Career statistics ==
Legend
GP	Games played	GS	Games started	MPG	Minutes per game
FG%	Field goal percentage	3P%	3-point field goal percentage	FT%	Free throw percentage
RPG	Rebounds per game	APG	Assists per game	SPG	Steals per game
BPG	Blocks per game	PPG	Points per game	**Bold**	Career high

=== NBA ===
==== Regular season ====
Year	Team	GP	GS	MPG	FG%	3P%	FT%	RPG	APG	SPG	BPG	PPG
1993–94†	Houston	**3**	0	**26.0**	**.500**	.364	**.500**	**5.0**	**2.3**	.0	.0	**10.3**
1996–97	New York	**3**	0	3.3	.333	**.667**	–	.3	.3	.0	.0	2.0
Career		6	0	14.7	.469	.429	.500	2.7	1.3	.0	.0	6.2

==== Playoffs ====
Year	Team	GP	GS	MPG	FG%	3P%	FT%	RPG	APG	SPG	BPG	PPG
1994†	Houston	11	0	5.6	.250	.231	–	.8	.6	.2	.0	1.2

== Head coaching record ==
Legend
Regular season	G	Games coached	W	Games won	L	Games lost	W–L %	Win–loss %
Playoffs	PG	Playoff games	PW	Playoff wins	PL	Playoff losses	PW–L %	Playoff win–loss %

Team	Year	G	W	L	W–L%	Finish	PG	PW	PL	PW–L%	Result
Orlando	2004–05	18	5	13	.278	3rd in Southeast	—	—	—	—	Missed Playoffs
**Career**		18	5	13	.278		—	—	—	—	
