= Gold Fever =

Gold Fever may refer to:

- Gold fever, or gold rush, a heightened migration to an area by people seeking fortune in gold mining
- Gold Fever (American TV series), a documentary television series airing on The Outdoor Channel
- Gold Fever (British TV series), a BBC documentary
- Gold Fever (film), a 1952 American Western film
