= Jesse James West =

American YouTuber and bodybuilder (born 2000)

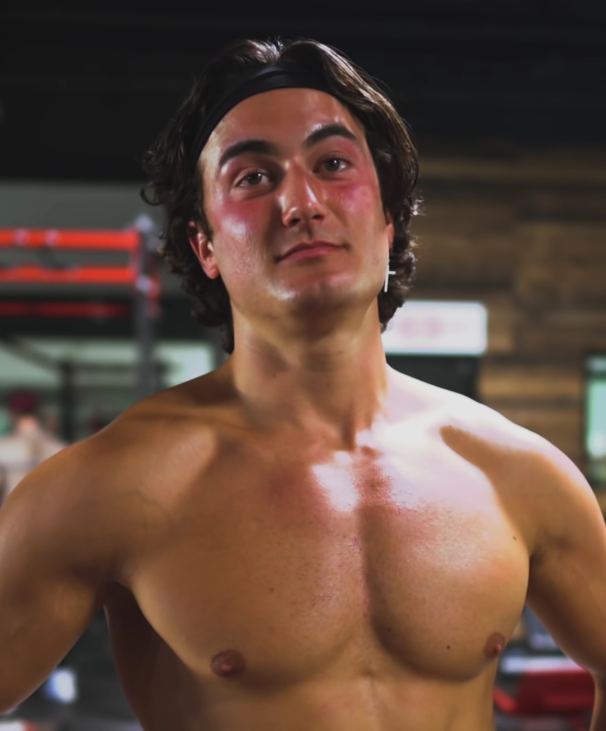
- West in 2020
- Born: January 25, 2000 (age 26); Sparta, New Jersey, U.S.
- Education: Lehigh University; Montclair State University
- Years active: 2016–present

Instagram information
- Page: Jesse James West
- Followers: 2.1 million

TikTok information
- Page: Jesse James West
- Followers: 1.5 million

YouTube information
- Channel: Jesse James West
- Genre: Fitness
- Subscribers: 10.7 million
- Views: 3.46 billion
- Last updated: August 27, 2026

Jesse James West (born January 25, 2000) is an American YouTuber, bodybuilder, and former Division 1 lacrosse player. West began making videos in 2016, while still in high school, and became known for his challenge videos and collaborations.

== Early life ==
Jesse James West was born on January 25, 2000, in Sparta, New Jersey. He was named after outlaw Jesse James. He played football up to eight grade, and was introduced to lacrosse by his fifth-grade football coach. In June 2015, as a freshman at Sparta High School, West committed to Lehigh University's Division 1 lacrosse program as the first freshman in the school's program's history to give a verbal. In his senior year, West earned first team All-State, first team All-Fitch-Pit, first team All-NJAC, first team All-New Jersey Herald, and New Jersey Herald Player of the Year. After one semester at Lehigh, West switched schools to Montclair State University, saying that he wanted to focus on more than just school and lacrosse, majoring in communication and media arts.

== Career ==
West began making lacrosse-related YouTube videos with a friend when they were both in seventh grade. He created his current YouTube channel in 2016 and began uploading consistently in 2017, posting lacrosse highlights and fitness videos.

In August 2021, West collaborated with Transparent Labs to make a pre-workout supplement. In July 2022, West collaborated with Ronnie Coleman and performed the workout Coleman did during his career. The next month, he took on the a challenge of living like Liver King for fifty hours. That month, he also collaborated with Jay Cutler for a video and replicated David Goggins' Navy SEAL workout for a day with Brandon William. In November, West lost a race against Larry Wheels to lift 100,000 pounds (45,000 kg) in an hour. In February 2023, West visited Billings, Montana, to raise awareness on depression and mental health. In June, he tried UFC fighter Michael Chandler's workout and sparred with him. In 2024, West made videos reporting on the fitness "steriod epidemic" and interviewed bodybuilders and sellers.
