= Greg Baty =

American football player (born 1964)

No. 48, 85, 84, 82
- Position: Tight end

Personal information
- Born: August 28, 1964 (age 62); Hastings, Michigan, U.S.
- Listed height: 6 ft 5 in (1.96 m)
- Listed weight: 241 lb (109 kg)

Career information
- High school: Sparta (Sparta, New Jersey)
- College: Stanford
- NFL draft: 1986: 8th round, 220th overall pick

Career history
- New England Patriots (1986–1987); Los Angeles Rams (1987); San Francisco 49ers (1988)*; Phoenix Cardinals (1988); New York Giants (1989)*; Tampa Bay Buccaneers (1989)*; Miami Dolphins (1990–1994)
- * Offseason or practice squad member only

Awards and highlights
- First-team All-Pac-10 (1985)

Career NFL statistics
- Receptions: 85
- Receiving yards: 883
- Touchdowns: 8
- Stats at Pro Football Reference

Gregory James Baty (/ˈbeɪti/ BAY-tee; born August 28, 1964) is an American former professional football player who was a tight end for eight seasons in the National Football League (NFL). He played college football at Stanford University.

== Career ==
In the NFL, Baty was selected by the New England Patriots in the eighth round with the 220th overall pick in the 1986 NFL draft. However, after being a representative for the players' union during the 1987 players' strike, he was repeatedly picked up but waived by several teams, including the Los Angeles Rams, the Arizona Cardinals, the New York Giants, and the Tampa Bay Buccaneers, before having a longer tenure with the Miami Dolphins.

== Personal life ==
His wife, Kathleen Gallagher Baty, was kidnapped by Lawrence Stagner, a former high school acquaintance, in Menlo Park, California, in May 1990. Through a surprise call from her mother, Kathleen Baty was able to alert the police before her kidnapper was able to take her away from her home. She was promptly rescued and Stagner arrested. Her case was one of several which led to the passage of anti-stalking laws in California. The incident was shown on an episode of Rescue 911 and Obsessed: Dark Obsessions.

Baty has been a resident of Sparta, New Jersey.
