= Pulp Comics =

- Genre: Sketch comedy Stand-up comedy
- Created by: Robert Small
- Country of origin: United States
- Original language: English
- No. of episodes: 15

Production
- Executive producer: Robert Small
- Running time: 20–25 minutes

Original release
- Network: Comedy Central
- Release: October 9, 1996 – February 22, 2000

Related
- Premium Blend

Pulp Comics is a television show of specials that aired on Comedy Central from 1996 to 2000. The show features stand-up comedians performing their acts, interspersed with original short films related to their rantings. It premiered on October 9, 1996.

== Episodes ==
No.	Title	Original release date
1	"Pulp Comics: Paul Provenza"	October 9, 1996
Comedy and sketches by Paul Provenza
2	"Pulp Comics: Bobcat Goldthwait"	December 4, 1996
Comedy and sketches by Bobcat Goldthwait
3	"Pulp Comics: Laura Kightlinger"	May 28, 1997
Comedy and sketches by Laura Kightlinger
4	"Pulp Comics: Dave Attell"	August 25, 1997
Comedy and sketches by Dave Attell
5	"Pulp Comics: Jim Breuer"	August 26, 1997
Comedy and sketches by Jim Breuer
6	"Pulp Comics: Jeffrey Ross"	March 25, 1998
Comedy and sketches by Jeffrey Ross
7	"Pulp Comics: Wendy Liebman"	March 22, 1998
Comedy and sketches by Wendy Liebman
8	"Pulp Comics: Julia Sweeney"	August 4, 1998
Comedy and sketches by Julia Sweeney
9	"Pulp Comics: Margaret Cho"	August 5, 1998
Comedy and sketches by Margaret Cho
10	"Pulp Comics: Dana Gould"	December 22, 1998
Comedy and sketches by Dana Gould
11	"Pulp Comics: Caroline Rhea"	February 14, 1999
Comedy and sketches by Caroline Rhea, featuring Whoopi Goldberg and Michael Gelman
12	"Pulp Comics: Scott Thompson"	May 23, 1999
Comedy and sketches by Scott Thompson
13	"Pulp Comics: David Alan Grier"	August 1, 1999
Comedy and sketches by David Alan Grier
14	"Pulp Comics: Louis C.K."	November 23, 1999
Comedy and sketches by Louis C.K.
15	"Pulp Comics: Harland Williams"	February 22, 2000
Comedy and sketches by Harland Williams
