= Hilltop Country Day School =

Coordinates: 41.11916°N 74.71151°W

Location
- 32 Lafayette Road; Sparta, NJ; USA

Information
- Type: Private, coeducational, day school
- Established: 1967
- Grades: Preschool - 8
- Enrollment: 110
- Accreditation: New Jersey Association of Independent Schools
- Website: School website

Hilltop Country Day School is an independent, nonsectarian coeducational day school located in Sparta, in Sussex County, New Jersey, United States. The school serves students in preschool through eighth grade. The school is divided into an Early Childhood Division (preschool, prekindergarten and kindergarten), a Lower school (grades 1-4) and Upper School (grades 5-8). The school is led by Head of School and a board of trustees composed of members of the community.

Hilltop Country Day School is an accredited member of the New Jersey Association of Independent Schools and a member of the National Association of Independent Schools.

== Facilities ==
Since 1972, Hilltop Country Day School has been located in the center of Sparta between Lafayette Road and Sparta Avenue. In 2002, Hilltop completed a 18,500 sq ft (1,720 m^{2}) addition that increased the physical size of the school to 35,000 sq ft (3,300 m^{2}). The addition included several new classrooms and a modern art studio, science lab and library and provides a new home for the Upper School and preschool programs.

Hilltop also has an open field available for Physical Education classes, recess and special events.

== Student Body and Curriculum ==
All students attend classes in Language Arts, Mathematics, Social Studies, and Science, as well as supplementary classes in Music, Art, Physical Education, and Computer. Hilltop also provides a strong program in World Language. Beginning preschool, students take Spanish. Students in first through third grade take a half a year of Mandarin and half a year of Spanish. Students in fourth through eighth grade of option of Mandarin or Spanish.

=== Early childhood ===
The Early Childhood Division consists of students in preschool-kindergarten. Preschoolers must be 2 1/2 and independently toilet trained to be considered for admission.

=== Lower School ===
The Lower School program consists of students in first grade through fourth grade.

=== Upper School ===
The Upper School consists of students in the fifth through eighth grade and uses a curriculum integrated with that of the Lower School.

In recent years, graduates have attended competitive local high schools including Blair Academy, Newark Academy and the Peddie School, as well as local public high schools.

=== PEAKS Program ===
The PEAKS program pairs younger and older students together to participate together in activities designed to teach students respect for others, teamwork and to smooth the transition between the Lower and Upper Schools. The parings are as follows:

- Pre-Kindergarten-4th grade
- Kindergarten-5th grade
- 1st grade-6th grade
- 2nd grade-7th grade
- 3rd grade-8th grade

== Other programs ==
Hilltop also runs several ancillary programs.

=== Extended Day and Enrichment Programs ===
The Extended Day program provides supervised homework help. The Enrichment Program offerings including but not limited to running club and Kiddie Soccer.

=== Summer programs ===
Hilltop offers a summer camp experience called Camp Apogee. This camp is a blend of S.T.E.A.M enrichment and traditional summer fun and swimming in the afternoon at The Lake Mohawk Pool. Camp Apogee is for children ages 5 to 13 and is open to non-Hilltop students.
