= Frank Dolce =

American actor (born 1996)

- Born: Francis Dolce Jr. May 24, 1996 (age 29)
- Occupation: Student
- Known for: Sons of Tucson, Doubt, One Life to Live

Frank Dolce (born May 24, 1996), is an American actor who has appeared on television on Sons of Tucson. He has also appeared on Broadway when he played the role of Michael in Billy Elliot the Musical, which was written by Elton John and Lee Hall.

Dolce is a resident of Sparta Township, New Jersey and was a 2014 graduate of Sparta High School, where he was a part of the school's golf team. He went on to enroll in the Mason Gross School of the Arts at Rutgers University.

== Filmography ==
=== Doubt ===
Dolce played a boy named Ralph in Doubt, a 2008 movie, that depicts "A Catholic school principal [who] questions a priest's ambiguous relationship with a troubled 12-year-old student.

=== Sons of Tucson ===
Sons of Tucson was aired on Fox in 2010. Dolce plays Gary Gunderson (age 11) who is the middle child of the Gunderson brothers and is the mastermind of hiring Ron as their fake father. Although he is very intellectual, he can get easily stressed by certain situations. In one episode his stress causes him to take blood pressure medication. His serious attitude always bothers people around him. Sons of Tucson was cancelled after only four episodes and the rest were burned off during the summer.

=== One Life to Live ===
On the ABC soap opera One Life to Live, Dolce played Brad in 11 episodes, but was uncredited for four, from March to June 2011.
