= Mary Vail Andress =

American banker

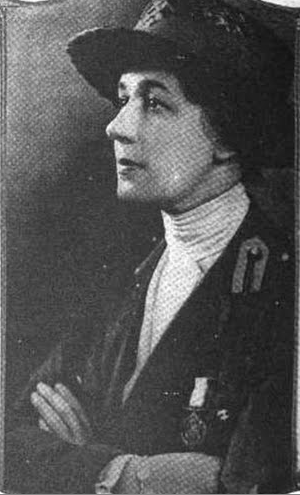
- Mary Vail Andress, from a 1924 publication
- Born: March 27, 1883; Sparta, New Jersey
- Died: May 15, 1964 (aged 81); New York
- Occupations: Banker, war relief worker
- Known for: Distinguished Service Medal (U.S. Army) (1919)

Mary Vail Andress (March 27, 1883 – May 15, 1964) was an American banker. She was "the first woman to become an officer of a major New York bank". She also did relief work during both World War I and World War II, and was "the first woman war worker to receive the Distinguished Service Medal".

== Early life ==
Andress was born in Sparta, New Jersey, the daughter of Theophilus Hunt Andress and Sarah Cecelia Cutler Andress. Her father was a physician and a Union Army veteran of the American Civil War. Theodore Newton Vail was her cousin, and Alfred Vail was her great-uncle.

Andress graduated from Moravian College in Bethlehem, Pennsylvania. Her mother and grandmother had also attended Moravian. She was captain of the basketball team as a student; later she served as a trustee of the college She attended the Summer School of Arts and Sciences at Yale University in 1905.

== Career ==
In 1917 and 1918, Andress joined the Women's Overseas Service League and ran a canteen and later directed the American Red Cross rest station in Toul, France. "For a while it seemed as if I could never quite get down to the real job," she recalled later, "it seemed so often that something new broke loose and always just at the wrong time." For her wartime service she was the first woman awarded the Distinguished Service Medal in 1919, and the medal was presented to her by General John J. Pershing. She also received the Medal of French Gratitude from the French government. In 1919 she went to work with Armenian refugees in Turkey and Georgia, for Near East Relief, and directed an orphanage in Tbilisi. She spent two years in this work.

Andress began working at the Paris office of Bankers Trust Company in 1920. She was assistant cashier at the main office of Chase National Bank from 1924 to 1940. In this, she became the first woman to work as an officer at a major New York bank. In 1937, she helped open Chase's London office. Later she was the first woman to serve on the bank's board of directors. "The average woman can manage her own affairs very well," she declared in a 1924 profile. "I have found her competent, judicial, and unflurried."

In 1940, she was again active in war relief, working for British War Relief, United China Relief Drive, and the Red Cross War Fund Drive. She and Anne Morgan created the Friends of France, to raise funds for war relief. In her later years, she served on the board of trustees of the American Craftsmen's Educational Council.

== Personal life ==
Mary Vail Andress died in 1964, in New York City, at age 81.
