= Hilltop Baptist School =

Location
- 6915 Palmer Park Blvd. Colorado Springs, CO 80915; United States; 38°51′27″N 104°41′58″W

Information
- Type: Private Christian
- Established: 1979
- School district: 49
- Principal: Jan Ocvirk
- Faculty: 20
- Grades: K-12
- Colors: Red, white and blue
- Athletics: 1A
- Athletics conference: Black Forest League
- Mascot: Centurion
- Affiliation: Southern Baptist
- ETS code: 060281

Hilltop Baptist School was a private Baptist Christian school located in Colorado Springs, Colorado, United States. The school was a ministry of Hilltop Baptist Church and belonged to the Southern Baptist Association of Christian Schools (SBACS).

== History ==
The school was founded in 1979.

Enrollment at Hilltop Baptist School fell after a teacher sexually abused a student and administrators, some related to the teacher, did not report the assault to the state and fired a teacher and a coach who did. The school subsequently closed. In its final year of operation, 2010–11, it had 43 students.
