= Gold Fever (American TV series) =

- Presented by: Tom Massie
- Country of origin: United States

Original release
- Network: Outdoor Channel
- Release: March 1, 1996 – September 19, 2015

Gold Fever is a documentary television series airing on The Outdoor Channel since 1996. It is hosted by Tom Massie and features some of the best places where gold can be found. The program is sponsored by the Gold Prospectors Association of America, an organization dedicated to prospecting.
