= Sons of Tucson =

2010 American sitcom

- The cast of Sons of Tucson (from left to right), Benjamin Stockham as Robby, Frank Dolce as Gary, Matthew Levy as Brandon and Tyler Labine as Ron.
- Genre: Sitcom
- Created by: Greg Bratman; Tommy Dewey
- Starring: Tyler Labine; Frank Dolce; Matthew Levy; Benjamin Stockham
- Composer: John Swihart
- Country of origin: United States
- Original language: English
- No. of seasons: 1
- No. of episodes: 13

Production
- Executive producers: Matthew Carlson; Justin Berfield; Jason Felts; Harvey Myman; Todd Holland
- Camera setup: Single-camera
- Running time: 22 minutes
- Production companies: J2TV; Walking Bud Productions; 20th Century Fox Television

Original release
- Network: Fox
- Release: March 14 – August 1, 2010

Sons of Tucson is an American sitcom starring Tyler Labine, Frank Dolce, Matthew Levy and Benjamin Stockham. It premiered on Fox on March 14, 2010. The show was announced as a midseason show to air on Sunday nights at 8:30 pm ET/PT in between animated hits, The Simpsons and Family Guy, although it was changed to 9:30 ET/PT, replacing American Dad!.

On April 5, 2010, it was announced that Fox had canceled Sons of Tucson after only four episodes; the remaining nine episodes that were ordered were burned off beginning June 6, and ending on August 1, 2010.

== Premise ==
The series is about the Gunderson brothers. They own a house in Tucson, Arizona, but since their mother left and their father is in prison, they hire Ron (Tyler Labine) to be their father. At first, the boys just need a father in specific situations, but then they find they have to keep Ron around because he is needed to shake off suspicions.

== Cast and characters ==
=== Main ===
- Ronald "Ron" Snuffkin (Tyler Labine) is a thirty-something sporting goods employee who is hired by the Gunderson brothers to substitute for their imprisoned father in order to shake away any suspicions from teachers and neighbors, who suspect that the boys are fending for themselves. He is a slacker who is always ready to take the easy way out of situations.
- Gary Gunderson (Frank Dolce) (age 11) is the middle child of the Gunderson brothers and is the one who comes up with the idea to hire Ron as their fake father. Although he is very intellectual, he can get easily stressed by certain situations. His stress causes him to take blood pressure medication and his serious attitude bothers those around him.
- Brandon Gunderson (Matthew Levy) (age 13) is the oldest of the brothers. Of the three brothers, he is most confused about life, but is always ready to speak his mind when something needs to be said. He is considered a free-spirit.
- Robert "Robby" Gunderson (Benjamin Stockham) (age 8) is the youngest and most troublesome of the brothers. He enjoys junk food and watching television for many hours.

=== Supporting ===
- Glenn (Joe Lo Truglio) is Ron's childhood friend. He is very impressionable and is always willing to follow Ron's schemes. He is frequently pushed around by his wife, Angela.
- Angela (Sarayu Rao) is Glenn's wife. She is very bossy (especially towards Glenn) and does not like the fact that her husband is friends with Ron. She is very suspicious of Ron's "fatherly care" for his "sons" and frequently pesters Glenn about wanting to have children.
- Maggie Morales (Natalie Martinez) is Robbie's third grade teacher. She is very serious about her job and sometimes worried about the environment Robbie is being raised in. It is assumed that Ron has a crush on her, after a failed attempt at getting a kiss, unbeknownst to her.
- Michael "Mike" Proudfoot (Michael Horse) is one of the employees at Ron's job, Sport Space. He is a Native American, who Ron always asks for advice on what a Native American would know about. Their conversations usually consist of Mike denouncing that he knows more about life than what he already knows about his heritage.
- Joker (Edwin H. Bravo, as Edwin Habacon) is one of Ron's friends who is always ready to let him in on his illegal but profitable activities.

=== Guest stars ===
Guest stars during the show's run included Allen Alvarado, Alexandra Breckenridge, Jake Busey, Stephanie Courtney, Kurt Fuller, Jamie Gray Hyder, David Lambert, Keegan-Michael Key, Michael Kostroff, Sydney Park, Stefanie Scott, Hailee Steinfeld, Stacey Travis, Andrew Walker, Nikki Ziering, Buddy Handleson and series producer Justin Berfield.

== Episodes ==
No.	Title	Directed by	Written by	Original release date	Prod. code	U.S. viewers (millions)
1	"Pilot"	Todd Holland	Greg Bratman & Tommy Dewey	March 11, 2010 (CAN); March 14, 2010 (US)	1ARK79	4.514
To avoid ending up in foster care after their father is sent to prison, brothers Brandon, Gary, and Robby Gunderson set their sights on paying Ron Snuffkin, a seemingly easy mark, to pretend to be their dad. The original deal is only to sign them up for school, but a fire at a school festival causes them to require his services again. In the meantime, Ron tries to use his new "family" to mend a rift with his grandmother so he can acquire a collectible set that will allow him to pay back a loan shark. After working together to solve their respective dilemmas, Ron talks the boys into a more long term arrangement.
2	"The Break-In"	Todd Holland	Adam Chase	March 18, 2010 (CAN); March 21, 2010 (US)	1ARK02	3.899
Ron runs into his old friend and running buddy Glenn (Joe Lo Truglio) at a rummage sale. After Ron hears about a recent robbery in the neighborhood, he convinces Glenn to break into the Gunderson house, hoping to scare the boys into allowing him to move in from the shed. But the rush gets to Glenn, who becomes the neighborhood thief, making his wife Angela (Sarayu Rao) suspicious of his behavior.
3	"Golden Ticket"	Fred Savage	Kristi Korzec & Robin Shorr	March 25, 2010 (CAN); March 28, 2010 (US)	1ARK11	4.140
Gabe (Buddy Handleson), a needy kid from Robby's class, turns out to have a cop for a dad. Seeing an opportunity, Ron invites the boy over for a sleepover to try to capitalize on a favor from the officer. But Gabe's already unwanted presence interferes with the Gunderson's film project, especially after the secret of their arrangement with Ron slips out in front of him.
4	"Family Album"	Todd Holland	Matthew Carlson	April 1, 2010 (CAN); April 4, 2010 (US)	1ARK01	3.133
Ron's performance at Career Day, along with Robby's reaction to it, sends up a red flag with Robby's teacher, and Ron tries to control the damage by inviting her over for dinner. But the effort to tidy up makes the house feel less than homey, so Ron and the boys set out to create a photo history of their supposed lives together so she doesn't get even more suspicious. Meanwhile, Brandon tries to encourage Gary to reinvent himself now that they're at a new school, but Gary doesn't approve.
5	"Chicken Pox"	Tamara Davis	Andy Bobrow	June 6, 2010	1ARK04	1.945
Ron checks in on the boys after a three-day absence to discover they all have the chicken pox, forcing him to become a full time care giver. He meets a single mom while picking up the boys' homework and invites her over for a date, in part so her daughter, who's never had the disease, can get it too. This turns into a love connection for Brandon, but Ron's date falls flat after he discovers that he is not immune to the chicken pox like he thought, and has now ended up getting sick himself. In the meantime, Gary, attending class via web cam, butts heads with his history teacher.
6	"The Debate Trip"	Kevin Dowling	Andy Bobrow	June 13, 2010	1ARK10	1.982
Gary needs Ron to drive him to his debate meet in Flagstaff because there’s no room in his teammate's carpool. When Angela discovers Brandon and Robby abandoned after they leave, she imposes her babysitting services, which doesn’t sit well with Brandon. Brandon makes an excuse and leaves to fend for himself, getting in over his head, while Robby, comfortable with the Gunderson lifestyle, clashes with Angela’s attempts at traditional mothering. On the trip, Ron discovers that Gary's teammates can’t stand him, even lying about the room in the carpool, and confronts him with the information after they fight.
7	"Father's Day"	Reginald Hudlin	Greg Bratman & Tommy Dewey	June 20, 2010	1ARK09	1.395
Ron overhears the boys getting a Father's Day gift for their dad, thinking they meant him (when they really meant their biological father). Ron (who grew up not celebrating Father's Day) goes all out for the holiday, getting a video game for the boys and arranging a barbecue inviting everyone he meets. Ron then learns the truth and makes a fool of himself at the barbecue. Meanwhile, the boys discuss what they should say to their imprisoned father, when he is given a ten-minute phone call.
8	"Gina"	Peter Lauer	Matthew Carlson	June 27, 2010	1ARK06	1.360
Ron's ex-girlfriend Gina (Alexandra Breckenridge) unexpectedly shows up at his job. He then invites her for a drink at the house, where she goes on and on about how her boyfriend, Danny (Andrew Walker) doesn't pay any attention to her. Ron convinces her to move out Danny's place and move in with him and the boys. But just when Ron's plan is about to come to effect, Gina sexually reconnects with Danny, breaking Ron's heart, who truly had genuine feelings for her. Meanwhile, Gary tests different music on bumble bees and feels he has made a scientific discovery... homosexual bumble bees.
9	"Dog Days of Tucson"	Peter Lauer	Michael Glouberman	July 4, 2010	1ARK05	1.120
Ron is given money to buy the boys a dog, but instead uses the cash to buy Kiss boots worn by Gene Simmons during the band's Hotter Than Hell Tour. He then picks a dog going through a dumpster and brings it home as the boy's pet, not knowing that the dog is actually a vicious, disease filled wolf that could turn on them at any time.
10	"Kisses and Beads"	Peter Lauer	Greg Bratman & Tommy Dewey	July 11, 2010	1ARK03	1.617
Ron feels that Robby should be hanging with people his own age, so he arranges a party in the garage with his friends. But instead of them actually having fun, he has them making bead bracelets for a new business venture on the side. Meanwhile, Ron arranges another party in the house so Gary can get his first kiss from his school crush, but Brandon's intruding leads to different circumstances.
11	"Glenn's Birthday"	Kevin Dowling	Adam Chase	July 18, 2010	1ARK07	1.510
Ron has a surprise for Glenn on his birthday, tickets to a pornography convention, but a prior commitment with Robby may cramp their style. On their way to the convention, they pay for and forget a barbecue grill that was loosely tied at the back of their car, Glenn forgets his ticket back at his house and they get arrested for speeding. Meanwhile, Gary and Brandon decide to start a band, but the two brothers instantly disagree over control.
12	"Sally Teel"	Todd Holland	Michael Glouberman	July 25, 2010	1ARK08	1.480
Robby is forced to enter a ballroom dancing contest with Sally Teel, a girl he harmed from the school fire in the pilot episode. She now has a bald spot from the incident making her have low self-esteem. Ron especially wants Robbie in the contest as favor to Sally's mother and to win a $5,000 prize, with Gary coaching them which brings back ill-fated memories for Gary who was once a skilled dancer. Meanwhile, Ron gets Brandon a job at Sport Space, but Ron's evil web of lies throughout the years keeps Brandon on the edge about the things that he says about Ron to the other employees.
13	"Ron Quits"	Todd Holland	Matthew Carlson	August 1, 2010	1ARK12	1.700
Ron and Gina are once again back together but their relationship hampers Ron's fatherly duties to the boys. They force him to make a decision: either them or Gina. Ron chooses Gina. Ron then moves out of the house especially after finding an unused furnished bedroom that the boys are saving for their real father, while all this time Ron was sleeping on the couch. Meanwhile, with their father's bank account frozen, the boys must stay on a tight budget, sell their possessions and move in a less than competent renter named Barry (played by series producer Justin Berfield).

== Production ==
The show was produced by 20th Century Fox Television, WalkingBud Productions and J2TV (Justin Berfield's production company).

Executive producer Todd Holland said Tyler Labine is "an actor who is funny" rather than a comedian. Labine needs to know the appropriate emotional response for his character. Frank Dolce, who plays 11-year-old Gary, said Gary is in charge because his 13-year-old brother just does what makes him feel good and goes along with what others want. His 8-year-old brother couldn't be in charge because he is "anti-authority". Co-creator Tommy Dewey said having an 11-year-old in charge was "more interesting".

== Recasting ==
In July 2009, Fox announced they were recasting the two principal roles of Robby and Brandon. Producer Justin Berfield states this was due to scheduling issues. Robby Gunderson was originally played by Davis Cleveland and Brandon Gunderson was originally played by Troy Gentile.

== Reception ==
In its original American broadcast, the pilot episode was viewed by 4.514 million viewers and received an 18-49 Nielsen Rating of 2.1/5 coming fourth in its timeslot and becoming the least viewed show on Fox that night.

Sandra Ganzalez of Entertainment Weekly gave the episode a positive review saying "Like I said, there is not much by way of plot, but the individual pieces of the show give it promise." As EW critic Ken Tucker said in his take, if you liked Tyler Labine’s laid-back-dude vibe in Reaper, you'll probably enjoy Sons of Tucson. Labine does a great job at making Snuffkin a lovable buffoon without crossing the line into campy. The pilot also rested on Labine’s ability to portray the undeniably creepy Snuffkin as likable, considering the premise." On Rotten Tomatoes, the series has an aggregate score of 33% based on 6 positive and 12 negative critic reviews. The website’s consensus reads: "Another formulaic and forgettable FOX sitcom, Sons of Tucson fails to bring anything new to the genre or the network."

== Broadcast history ==
The series premiered on March 11, 2010, in Canada on Global at 9:30 pm ET, and on March 14, 2010, in the United States on Fox at 9:30 pm ET. This schedule remained until its cancellation was announced on April 5, 2010, after only four episodes. It returned to air its remaining episodes on June 6, 2010, airing Sundays at 7:30 pm ET (then at 7:00 pm ET on June 27, 2010) on Fox, and at 10:30 pm ET on Global.

== In popular culture ==
- First on the Family Guy episode "Excellence in Broadcasting", when Stewie Griffin notes, that "Fox sometimes has bad ideas" while a fake ad for Sons of Tucson appears on-screen. He then points at the ad and goes on saying: "Let's all just sit here and remember that this was a thing."
- The show would be mocked in the American Dad! episode "Jenny Fromdabloc" for its replacement of the show in its original run's timeslot, in which Roger reads an advertisement printed on a promotional stress ball, and says: " 'Sons of Tucson – New on Fox'? When was THIS on? I watch Fox all the time; I never saw this!" As a further mockery, the stress ball had just been revealed to serve as a makeshift vagina for Roger to engage in sexual intercourse with under the alias of the episode's title; in a later scene, Roger, having just finished "using" the ball, is seen putting it into a dishwasher before walking away, whistling the American Dad theme song after he did so, and even during the episode's end credits, a scene is shown (albeit one more specifically mocking a similar scene in the then-recent film Inception) heavily implying character Steve Smith later uses the ball for masturbation, a final scene of mockery for the show's fallen former sister program.
