= Finneas O'Connell discography =

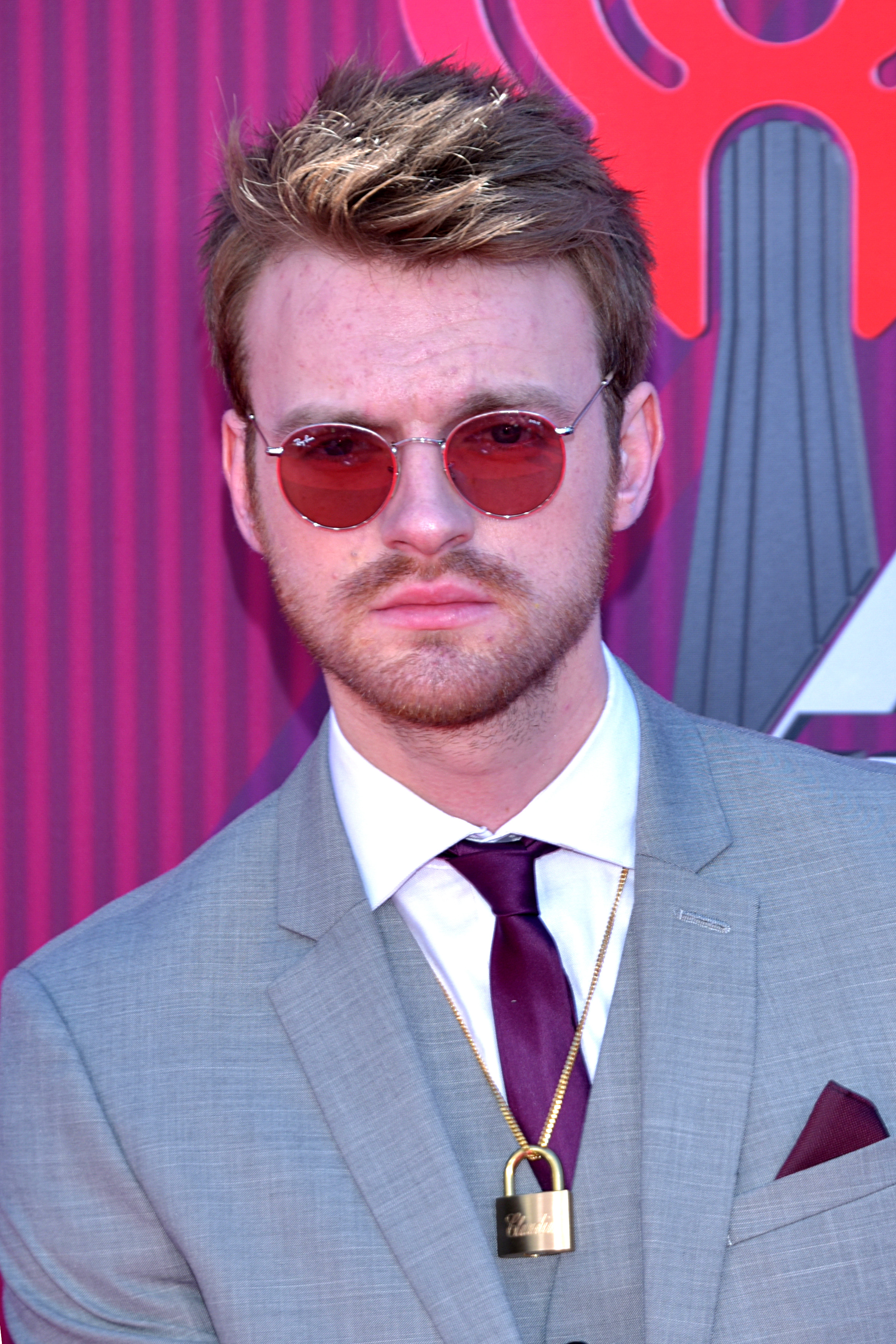
- O'Connell at the 2019 iHeartRadio Music Awards
- Studio albums: 2
- EPs: 2
- Soundtrack albums: 3
- Singles: 25
- Music videos: 10

American singer, songwriter, record producer, and composer Finneas O'Connell has released two studio albums, three soundtrack albums, one extended play and 25 singles (including three as a featured artist). The singer began his career after he wrote and produced Billie Eilish's song "Ocean Eyes". Finneas and Eilish uploaded "Ocean Eyes" to SoundCloud in November 2015, and it became an instant hit.

Finneas' debut EP Blood Harmony, peaked at number 14 on the US Heatseekers Album chart, while its lead single "Let's Fall in Love for the Night", peaked at number 17 and 24 on the US Billboard Alternative Songs and Rock Airplay charts, respectively. It has also received a gold certification by Music Canada (MC), which denotes track-equivalent sales of forty-thousand units based on sales and streams. His single "What They'll Say About Us" peaked at number 35 on the US Billboard Hot Rock & Alternative Songs chart.

== Studio albums ==
Title	Details	Peak chart positions									
Title	Details	US	US Alt.	AUS	AUT	BEL (FL)	GER	NLD	NZ	SWI	UK
Optimist	Released: October 15, 2021; Label: Interscope; Formats: LP, CD, cassette, digital download, streaming	104	9	—	59	53	53	60	—	40	—
For Cryin' Out Loud!	Released: October 4, 2024; Label: Interscope; Formats: Streaming	82	11	56	48	10	33	9	31	52	35

=== Soundtrack albums ===
Title	Details
The Fallout	Released: January 28, 2022; Label: WaterTower; Formats: Digital download, streaming
Vengeance	Released: July 29, 2022; Label: Back Lot; Formats: Digital download, streaming
Disclaimer	Released: November 8, 2024; Label: Interscope; Formats: Digital download, streaming
Beef (Season 2)	Released: April 16. 2026; Label: A24 Music; Formats: Digital download, streaming

== EPs ==
Title	Details	Peak chart positions
Title	Details	US Heat.
Blood Harmony	Released: October 4, 2019; Label: OYOY, AWAL; Formats: LP, digital download, streaming	14
Spotify Singles	Released: March 9, 2022; Label: OYOY, Interscope; Formats: Streaming	—

== Singles ==
=== As lead artist ===
Title	Year	Peak chart positions									Certifications	Album
Title	Year	US	US Rock	AUS	BEL (FL) Tip	CAN	IRE	NZ Hot	UK	WW	Certifications	Album
"New Girl"	2016	—	—	—	—	—	—	—	—	—		Non-album singles
"I'm in Love Without You"	2017	—	—	—	—	—	—	—	—	—		Non-album singles
"Break My Heart Again" (Note: "Break My Heart Again" was originally released as a non-album single, but was later released on the Deluxe edition of Blood Harmony in 2020.)	2018	—	—	—	—	—	—	—	—	—	MC: Gold; RMNZ: Gold	Blood Harmony (Deluxe)
"Heaven"	2018	—	—	—	—	—	—	—	—	—		Non-album singles
"Life Moves On"	2018	—	—	—	—	—	—	—	—	—		Non-album singles
"Landmine"	2018	—	—	—	—	—	—	—	—			Non-album singles
"Hollywood Forever"	2018	—	—	—	—	—	—	—	—	—		Non-album singles
"College"	2018	—	—	—	—	—	—	—	—	—		Non-album singles
"Luck Pusher"	2018	—	—	—	—	—	—	—	—	—		Non-album singles
"Let's Fall in Love for the Night"	2018	—	— (Note: "Let's Fall in Love for the Night" did not enter the US Hot Rock & Alternative Songs chart, but did peak at number 24 on the Rock Airplay chart.)	—	—	—	—	—	—	—	RIAA: Gold; BPI: Silver; MC: Platinum; RMNZ: Platinum	Blood Harmony
"Claudia"	2019	—	—	—	—	—	—	—	—	—		Non-album single
"I Lost a Friend"	2019	—	—	—	—	—	—	—	—	—	MC: Gold	Blood Harmony
"Angel"	2019	—	—	—	—	—	—	—	—	—		Non-album single
"Shelter"	2019	—	—	—	—	—	—	—	—	—		Blood Harmony
"I Don't Miss You at All"	2019	—	—	—	—	—	—	—	—	—		Blood Harmony
"What They'll Say About Us"	2020	—	35	—	26	—	—	40	—	—		Optimist
"Can't Wait to Be Dead"	2020	—	—	—	—	—	—	—	―	—		Non-album singles
"Where the Poison Is"	2020	—	—	—	—	—	—	—	—	—		Non-album singles
"Another Year"	2020	—	—	—	—	—	—	—	—	—		Non-album singles
"American Cliché"	2021	—	—	—	—	—	—	—	—	—		Non-album singles
"Till Forever Falls Apart" (with Ashe)	2021	— (Note: "Till Forever Falls Apart" did not enter the Billboard Hot 100 but did peak at number 27 on the Digital Song Sales chart.)	19	—	—	— (Note: "Till Forever Falls Apart" did not enter the Canadian Hot 100 but did peak at number 33 on the Canadian Digital Song Sales chart.)	75	27	—	—	RIAA: Gold; RMNZ: Platinum	Ashlyn
"A Concert Six Months from Now"	2021	—	—	—	—	—	—	—	—	—		Optimist
"The 90s"	2021	—	—	—	—	—	—	—	—	—		Optimist
"Nobody Like U" (with 4*Town)	2022	49	—	91	—	34	63	18	57	37	RIAA: Gold; MC: Gold	Turning Red (Original Motion Picture Soundtrack)
"Naked"	2022	—	—	—	—	—	—	39	—	—		Non-album singles
"Mona Lisa, Mona Lisa"	2022	—	—	—	—	—	—	—	—	—		Non-album singles
"For Cryin' Out Loud!"	2024	—	—	—	—	—	—	23	—	—		For Cryin' Out Loud!
"Cleats"	2024	—	—	—	—	—	—	40	—	—		For Cryin' Out Loud!
"—" denotes a recording that did not chart or was not released in that territory.

=== As featured artist ===
Title	Year	Album
"Goodnews Bay" (Eli Way featuring Gabrielle Current and Finneas)	2016	Non-album singles
"Evermore" (Prince Paris featuring Gabrielle Current and Finneas)	2016	Non-album singles
"Come to Think" (Gabrielle Current featuring Finneas)	2017	Non-album singles
"Hate to Be Lame" (Lizzy McAlpine featuring Finneas)	2022	Five Seconds Flat

== Other charted songs ==
Title	Year	Peak chart positions	Album
Title	Year	NZ Hot	Album
"Starfucker"	2024	29	For Cryin' Out Loud!
"What's It Gonna Take to Break Your Heart?"	2024	24	For Cryin' Out Loud!
"2001"	2024	32	For Cryin' Out Loud!
"Family Feud"	2024	27	For Cryin' Out Loud!

== Guest appearances ==
Title	Year	Other artist(s)	Album
"Call Me When You Find Yourself"	2015	Maggie Baird	Life Inside Out
"Maybe I'm Losing My Mind"	2015	The Slightlys	Life Inside Out
"Your Mother's Favorite"	2015	The Slightlys	Life Inside Out
"The Ending"	2018	Wafia	VIII EP
"Sunny"	2020	Billie Eilish	One World: Together at Home
"Let's Fall in Love for the Night"	2020	—N/a	One World: Together at Home

== Music videos ==
List of music videos, with directors, showing year released
Title	Year	Director(s)
"I'm In Love Without You"	2017	Emma Sydney Menzies
"New Girl"	2019	Emma Sydney Menzies
"Let's Fall in Love for the Night"	2019	Sam Bennett
"Break My Heart Again"	2019	Sam Bennett
"What They'll Say About Us"	2020	Sam Bennett
"Can't Wait to Be Dead"	2020	Constellation Jones
"Till Forever Falls Apart"	2021	Sam Bennett
"A Concert Six Months from Now"	2021	Sam Bennett
"The 90s"	2021	Sam Bennett
"For Cryin' Out Loud!"	2024	Isaac Ravishankara
"Cleats"	2024	Isaac Ravishankara
"Lotus Eater"	2024	Isaac Ravishankara
"2001"	2025	Claudia Sulewski

=== Appearances ===
List of music videos, with directors, showing year released
Title	Year	Director(s)
"Bikini Porn" (Tove Lo)	2020	Moni Haworth
"Everything I Wanted" (Billie Eilish)	2020	Billie Eilish
"Say What You Will" (James Blake)	2021	Bear Damen

== Songwriting and production credits ==
Year	Title	Artist	Album	Writer or co-writer	Producer or co-producer
2016	"Come to Think"	Gabrielle Current	Non-album single	check	check
2016	"Six Feet Under"	Billie Eilish	Non-album single	check	check
2016	"Ocean Eyes"	Billie Eilish	Don't Smile at Me	check	check
2017	"Your Eyes" (featuring Tayla Parx)	The Knocks	Testify EP	check	
2017	"Filthy Rich"	Evalyn	Non-album single		check
2017	"Bellyache"	Billie Eilish	Don't Smile at Me	check	check
2017	"Bored"	Billie Eilish	Don't Smile at Me	check	check
2017	"Lost My Mind"	Alice Kristiansen	Non-album single	check	check
2017	"Watch"	Billie Eilish	Don't Smile at Me	check	check
2017	"Copycat"	Billie Eilish	Don't Smile at Me	check	check
2017	"Idontwannabeyouanymore"	Billie Eilish	Don't Smile at Me	check	check
2017	"My Boy"	Billie Eilish	Don't Smile at Me	check	check
2017	"Party Favor"	Billie Eilish	Don't Smile at Me	check	check
2017	"Hostage"	Billie Eilish	Don't Smile at Me	check	check
2017	"Satellite"	Rebecca Black	RE / BL	check	check
2017	"&burn" (with Vince Staples)	Billie Eilish	Don't Smile at Me	check	check
2018	"Bitches Broken Hearts"	Billie Eilish	Don't Smile at Me	check	check
2018	"Lovely" (with Khalid)	Billie Eilish	Don't Smile at Me	check	check
2018	"You Should See Me in a Crown"	Billie Eilish	When We All Fall Asleep, Where Do We Go?	check	check
2018	"When the Party's Over"	Billie Eilish	When We All Fall Asleep, Where Do We Go?	check	check
2018	"Come Out and Play"	Billie Eilish	Non Album Single	check	check
2019	"When I Was Older"	Billie Eilish	Music Inspired By the Film Roma	check	check
2019	"Bury a Friend"	Billie Eilish	When We All Fall Asleep, Where Do We Go?	check	check
2019	"Moral of the Story"	Ashe	Moral of the Story: Chapter 1 EP	check	check
2019	"Wish You Were Gay"	Billie Eilish	When We All Fall Asleep, Where Do We Go?	check	check
2019	"!!!!!!!"	Billie Eilish	When We All Fall Asleep, Where Do We Go?	check	check
2019	"Bad Guy"	Billie Eilish	When We All Fall Asleep, Where Do We Go?	check	check
2019	"Xanny"	Billie Eilish	When We All Fall Asleep, Where Do We Go?	check	check
2019	"All the Good Girls Go to Hell"	Billie Eilish	When We All Fall Asleep, Where Do We Go?	check	check
2019	"8"	Billie Eilish	When We All Fall Asleep, Where Do We Go?	check	check
2019	"My Strange Addiction"	Billie Eilish	When We All Fall Asleep, Where Do We Go?	check	check
2019	"Ilomilo"	Billie Eilish	When We All Fall Asleep, Where Do We Go?	check	check
2019	"Listen Before I Go"	Billie Eilish	When We All Fall Asleep, Where Do We Go?	check	check
2019	"I Love You"	Billie Eilish	When We All Fall Asleep, Where Do We Go?	check	check
2019	"Goodbye"	Billie Eilish	When We All Fall Asleep, Where Do We Go?	check	check
2019	"Everything I Wanted"	Billie Eilish	When We All Fall Asleep, Where Do We Go?	check	check
2019	"Tear Myself Apart"	Tate McRae	All The Things I Never Said	check	
2019	"If the World Was Ending" (featuring Julia Michaels)	JP Saxe	Hold It Together		check
2019	"Lose You to Love Me"	Selena Gomez	Rare		check
2019	"Used To This"	Camila Cabello	Romance	check	check
2019	"First Man"	Camila Cabello	Romance		check
2020	"Bikini Porn"	Tove Lo	Sunshine Kitty: Paw Prints Edition	check	check
2020	"Passion and Pain Taste the Same When I'm Weak"	Tove Lo	Sunshine Kitty: Paw Prints Edition	check	check
2020	"I Hate Everybody"	Halsey	Manic	check	check
2020	"No Time To Die"	Billie Eilish	Non-album single	check	check
2020	"Past Life"	Trevor Daniel	Nicotine	check	check
2020	"Jealous"	Lennon Stella	Three. Two. One.	check	
2020	"So Will I"	Ben Platt	Non-album single		check
2020	"The Most Beautiful Thing"	Bruno Major	To Let a Good Thing Die	check	
2020	"I Can See The Change"	Celeste	—N/a		check
2020	"My Future"	Billie Eilish	Happier Than Ever	check	check
2020	"Commander in Chief"	Demi Lovato	—N/a	check	check
2020	"Lonely"	Justin Bieber, Benny Blanco	Justice	check	check
2020	"Therefore I Am"	Billie Eilish	Happier Than Ever	check	check
2020	"Beautiful Trip"	Kid Cudi	Man on the Moon III: The Chosen	check	check
2020	"Sept. 16"	Kid Cudi	Man on the Moon III: The Chosen	check	check
2021	"Lo Vas a Olvidar"	Billie Eilish, Rosalía	Euphoria (Original Score from the HBO Series)	check	check
2021	"Serotonin"	Girl in Red	If I Could Make It Go Quiet		check
2021	"Your Power"	Billie Eilish	Happier Than Ever	check	check
2021	"Lost Cause"	Billie Eilish	Happier Than Ever	check	check
2021	"NDA"	Billie Eilish	Happier Than Ever	check	check
2021	"Getting Older"	Billie Eilish	Happier Than Ever	check	check
2021	"I Didn't Change My Number"	Billie Eilish	Happier Than Ever	check	check
2021	"Billie Bossa Nova"	Billie Eilish	Happier Than Ever	check	check
2021	"Oxytocin"	Billie Eilish	Happier Than Ever	check	check
2021	"Goldwing"	Billie Eilish	Happier Than Ever	check	check
2021	"Halley's Comet"	Billie Eilish	Happier Than Ever	check	check
2021	"Not My Responsibility"	Billie Eilish	Happier Than Ever	check	check
2021	"Overheated"	Billie Eilish	Happier Than Ever	check	check
2021	"Everybody Dies"	Billie Eilish	Happier Than Ever	check	check
2021	"Happier Than Ever"	Billie Eilish	Happier Than Ever	check	check
2021	"Male Fantasy"	Billie Eilish	Happier Than Ever	check	check
2022	"Nobody Like U"	4*TOWN	Turning Red (Original Motion Picture Soundtrack)	check	
2022	"1 True Love"	4*TOWN	Turning Red (Original Motion Picture Soundtrack)	check	
2022	"U Know What's Up"	4*TOWN	Turning Red (Original Motion Picture Soundtrack)	check	
2022	"I Still Say Goodnight"	Tate McRae	"I Used to Think I Could Fly"	check	check
2023	"What Was I Made For?"	Billie Eilish	Barbie the Album	check	check
2023	"Are You Gone Already"	Nicki Minaj	Pink Friday 2	check	check
2024	"Skinny"	Billie Eilish	Hit Me Hard and Soft	check	check
2024	"Lunch"	Billie Eilish	Hit Me Hard and Soft	check	check
2024	"Chihiro"	Billie Eilish	Hit Me Hard and Soft	check	check
2024	"Birds of a Feather"	Billie Eilish	Hit Me Hard and Soft	check	check
2024	"Wildflower"	Billie Eilish	Hit Me Hard and Soft	check	check
2024	"The Greatest"	Billie Eilish	Hit Me Hard and Soft	check	check
2024	"L'Amour de Ma Vie"	Billie Eilish	Hit Me Hard and Soft	check	check
2024	"The Diner"	Billie Eilish	Hit Me Hard and Soft	check	check
2024	"Bittersuite"	Billie Eilish	Hit Me Hard and Soft	check	check
2024	"Blue"	Billie Eilish	Hit Me Hard and Soft	check	check
2025	"Scared of Loving You"	Selena Gomez	I Said I Love You First	check	check
2025	"Still Gonna Love You"	Gwen Stefani	Bouquet (Deluxe)	check	
2026	"Sex Star"	Troye Sivan	She's the Best	check	check
