= American Idol season 19 =

Nineteenth season (2021) of the American reality show singing competition

American Idol
- Season 19
- Promotional poster
- Hosted by: Ryan Seacrest
- Judges: Luke Bryan; Katy Perry; Lionel Richie
- Winner: Chayce Beckham
- Runner-up: Willie Spence
- No. of episodes: 19

Release
- Original network: ABC
- Original release: February 14 – May 23, 2021

Season chronology
- ← Previous; Season 18 Next → Season 20

The nineteenth season of American Idol premiered on February 14, 2021, on the ABC television network. Ryan Seacrest returned as host, while Luke Bryan, Katy Perry, and Lionel Richie returned as judges, and Bobby Bones came back as the in-house mentor.

Chayce Beckham won the season on May 23, 2021, while Willie Spence was the runner-up, and Grace Kinstler finished in third place.

== Auditions ==
Due to the COVID-19 pandemic in the United States, American Idol offered live virtual auditions to aspiring contestants through its Idol Across America program using custom-built Zoom technology to mirror the way the audition was done in previous season but in a home environment. The remote auditions took place from August 10 to October 28, 2020, in all 50 states, plus Washington, D.C., as well as a number of open-call auditions, and from these the producers selected the contestants who would then be invited to audition in front of the judges.

Due to the pandemic that limited travel for the judges, the judges' auditions were held in only three locations across California: Los Angeles, San Diego, and Ojai. The judges' auditions began on October 5, 2020, with a number of health and safety protocols in place, such as separate tables for the judges and regular COVID-19 testing for cast and crew.

American Idol (season 19) – auditions
City	Filming date(s)	Filming venue
Los Angeles, California	October 5–6, 2020	The Hollywood Roosevelt Hotel
San Diego, California	October 16–17, 2020	InterContinental San Diego
Ojai, California	November 16–17, 2020	Ojai Valley Inn

== Hollywood week ==
Hollywood week was filmed December 7–10, 2020, at the Dolby Theatre in Los Angeles. The format remained similar to last season. In the first round, each contestant chose and performed a song from a selection of musical genres (indie folk, pop, rock, R&B, soul, or country). Those who impressed the judges and the producers were advanced to the next round. Instead of group performances as had been done in earlier seasons, the contestants were paired up by the judges and performed duets. They were given twenty-four hours to rehearse, which included advice from one of the judges. Judges could advance either, neither, or both of the contestants to the Showstopper round.

== Showstopper round ==
The Showstopper round featured the top 64 contestants performing for the judges at the Dolby Theatre. The round was aired on March 28 and March 29, but only 37 contestants were aired. The next day, the judges narrowed the number of contestants to 24. Here is a list of the contestants who reached the top 24 and the song they performed. Contestants are listed in the order they performed.

Showstopper round (March 28 & March 29)
Contestant	Song
Alyssa Wray	"I'm Here"
Jason Warrior	"Believer"
Andrea Valles	"Blinding Lights"
Chayce Beckham	"You Should Probably Leave"
Caleb Kennedy	"When You Leave Tonight"
Wyatt Pike	"Blame It on Me"
Cassandra Coleman	"Running with the Wolves"
Beane	"What's Going On"
Hannah Everhart	"Wrecking Ball"
Graham DeFranco	"Beautiful War"
Alanis Sophia	"Uninvited"
Casey Bishop	"She Talks to Angels"
Willie Spence	"I Was Here"
Mary Jo Young	"Us"
Hunter Metts	"July"
Grace Kinstler	"Father"
Deshawn Goncalves	"Over the Rainbow"
Colin Jamieson	"Sugar, We're Goin Down"
Ava August	"Ghost of You"
Liahona Olayan	"Me Too"
Madison Watkins	"It's a Man's Man's Man's World"
Alana Sherman	"Bust Your Windows"
Anilee List (Note: Anilee List was originally eliminated, but was invited back after Benson Boone withdrew from the competition.)	"Ain't Nobody"
Cecil Ray	"Beyond"

== Top 24 (April 4 & 5) ==
The top 24 contestants were split into two groups of twelve. The first group aired on April 4, and the second group on April 5. Each contestant performed one solo and then one duet with a celebrity singer. Four contestants from each group were eliminated based on the public vote, and the rest advanced to the top 16. Contestants are listed in the order they performed.

The artists who performed duets with the top 24 were Jason Aldean, Jimmie Allen, Brandon Boyd, Jewel, Josh Groban, Tori Kelly, Brian McKnight, Katharine McPhee, PJ Morton, Ben Rector, Joss Stone, and Ryan Tedder.

Color key:

This contestant was saved by America's vote.
This contestant was eliminated.

Group 1 (April 4)
Contestant	Order	Song	Result
Alanis Sophia	1	"Alive"	Safe
Alanis Sophia	1	"Shallow" (with Jimmie Allen)	Safe
Cassandra Coleman	2	"Find Me"	Safe
Cassandra Coleman	2	"Apologize" (with Ryan Tedder)	Safe
Alyssa Wray	3	"Something in the Water"	Safe
Alyssa Wray	3	"I'm Your Baby Tonight" (with Katharine McPhee)	Safe
Wyatt Pike	4	"Rubberband"	Safe
Wyatt Pike	4	"Brand New" (with Ben Rector)	Safe
Alana Sherman	5	"Blow Your Mind (Mwah)"	Eliminated
Alana Sherman	5	"Back at One" (with Brian McKnight)	Eliminated
Anilee List	6	"My Future"	Eliminated
Anilee List	6	"Tell Me Something Good" (with Joss Stone)	Eliminated
Deshawn Goncalves	7	"Forever Young"	Safe
Deshawn Goncalves	7	"I Lived" (with Ryan Tedder)	Safe
Graham DeFranco	8	"Raye"	Safe
Graham DeFranco	8	"Love Like This" (with Ben Rector)	Safe
Andrea Valles	9	"Lo Vas a Olvidar"	Eliminated
Andrea Valles	9	"Careless Whisper" (with Brian McKnight)	Eliminated
Cecil Ray	10	"Paint Me a Birmingham"	Eliminated
Cecil Ray	10	"Freedom Was a Highway" (with Jimmie Allen)	Eliminated
Willie Spence	11	"Wind Beneath My Wings"	Safe
Willie Spence	11	"The Prayer" (with Katharine McPhee)	Safe
Grace Kinstler	12	"Queen"	Safe
Grace Kinstler	12	"Midnight Train to Georgia" (with Joss Stone)	Safe

Group 2 (April 5)
Contestant	Order	Song	Result
Jason Warrior	1	"Call Out My Name"	Eliminated
Jason Warrior	1	"How Deep Is Your Love" (with PJ Morton)	Eliminated
Madison Watkins	2	"Holy"	Safe
Madison Watkins	2	"Don't You Worry 'bout a Thing" (with Tori Kelly)	Safe
Beane	3	"Don't Start Now"	Safe
Beane	3	"Angels" (with Josh Groban)	Safe
Hannah Everhart	4	"I Was Wrong"	Eliminated
Hannah Everhart	4	"She's Country" (with Jason Aldean)	Eliminated
Mary Jo Young	5	"Castle on the Hill"	Eliminated
Mary Jo Young	5	"Foolish Games" (with Jewel)	Eliminated
Chayce Beckham	6	"Afterglow"	Safe
Chayce Beckham	6	"Drive" (with Brandon Boyd)	Safe
Colin Jamieson	7	"Locked Out of Heaven"	Safe
Colin Jamieson	7	"Hollow" (with Tori Kelly)	Safe
Liahona Olayan	8	"Just Friends"	Eliminated
Liahona Olayan	8	"Say So" (with PJ Morton)	Eliminated
Ava August	9	"Drivers License"	Safe
Ava August	9	"Both Sides, Now" (with Josh Groban)	Safe
Caleb Kennedy	10	"Midnight Rider"	Safe
Caleb Kennedy	10	"Fly Over States" (with Jason Aldean)	Safe
Hunter Metts	11	"Chandelier"	Safe
Hunter Metts	11	"Who Will Save Your Soul" (with Jewel)	Safe
Casey Bishop	12	"Decode"	Safe
Casey Bishop	12	"Wish You Were Here" (with Brandon Boyd)	Safe

== Top 16 (April 11 & 12) ==
The Top 16 performances aired on Sunday, April 11 and were followed by the live results show on Monday, April 12. Paula Abdul served as a guest judge on April 12 after Luke Bryan tested positive for COVID-19.

Color key:

This contestant was chosen by the public to advance.
This contestant was not chosen by the public, and had to perform again for the judges.
This contestant was not chosen by the public, but was chosen by the judges as a Wild Card pick.
This contestant withdrew from the competition.
This contestant was eliminated.

Contestants are listed in the order they performed.

Top 16 (April 11)
Contestant	Song	Result
Alyssa Wray	"Killing Me Softly with His Song"	Safe
Graham DeFranco	"That's Life"	Wild Card
Grace Kinstler	"Elastic Heart"	Safe
Alanis Sophia	"The Story"	Wild Card
Willie Spence	"Set Fire to the Rain"	Safe
Deshawn Goncalves	"Feeling Good"	Safe
Wyatt Pike	"Use Somebody"	Withdrew (Note: Wyatt Pike withdrew from the competition prior to the results show for personal reasons.)
Cassandra Coleman	"Wicked Game"	Safe
Caleb Kennedy	"Midnight Train to Memphis"	Safe
Colin Jamieson	"Everybody Wants to Rule the World"	Wild Card
Casey Bishop	"Black Hole Sun"	Safe
Madison Watkins	"Gravity"	Wild Card
Beane	"Searching for a Feeling"	Wild Card
Hunter Metts	"Skinny Love"	Safe
Ava August	"2002"	Safe
Chayce Beckham	"Waiting in Vain"	Safe

Results show (April 12)
Contestant	Song	Result
Casey Bishop	"The House of the Rising Sun"	Safe
Colin Jamieson	"Waves"	Eliminated
Deshawn Goncalves	"Higher Ground"	Safe
Cassandra Coleman	"Light On"	Safe
Caleb Kennedy	"Nowhere"	Safe
Madison Watkins	"Hotline Bling"	Saved by the judges
Ava August	"Love of My Life"	Safe
Beane	"Grow as We Go"	Saved by the judges
Chayce Beckham	"What Brings Life Also Kills"	Safe
Alyssa Wray	"Greatest Love of All"	Safe
Alanis Sophia	"Heart Attack"	Eliminated
Willie Spence	"Diamonds"	Safe
Grace Kinstler	"Dangerous Woman"	Safe
Hunter Metts	"I Can't Make You Love Me"	Safe
Graham DeFranco	"Cover Me Up"	Eliminated

== Top 12 ==
Color key:

This contestant was saved by America's vote.
This contestant was eliminated.
This contestant won American Idol.
This contestant was the runner-up.
This contestant finished in third place.

=== Top 12 – Oscar-nominated songs (April 18) ===
Each contestant performed one Oscar-nominated song. Contestants are listed in the order they performed.

Top 12 (April 18)
Contestant	Song	Film	Result
Grace Kinstler	"Happy"	Despicable Me 2	Safe
Ava August	"City of Stars"	La La Land	Eliminated
Caleb Kennedy	"On the Road Again"	Honeysuckle Rose	Safe
Hunter Metts	"Falling Slowly"	Once	Safe
Madison Watkins	"Run to You"	The Bodyguard	Eliminated
Chayce Beckham	"(Everything I Do) I Do It for You"	Robin Hood: Prince of Thieves	Safe
Beane	"(I've Had) The Time of My Life"	Dirty Dancing	Eliminated
Alyssa Wray	"This Is Me"	The Greatest Showman	Safe
Deshawn Goncalves	"The Way We Were"	The Way We Were	Safe
Casey Bishop	"Over the Rainbow"	The Wizard of Oz	Safe
Cassandra Coleman	"Writing's on the Wall"	Spectre	Safe
Willie Spence	"Stand Up"	Harriet	Safe

=== The Comeback (April 19) ===
Ten contestants from last season were brought back to compete for a second chance since last season's production was forced to go entirely remote because of the COVID-19 pandemic. Only one was allowed to re-enter the competition. Contestants are listed in the order they performed.

The Comeback (April 19)
Contestant	Song	Result
Cyniah Elise	"Edge of Midnight (Midnight Sky Remix)"	Eliminated
Nick Merico	"City Lights"	Eliminated
Aliana Jester	"I'll Never Love Again"	Eliminated
Franklin Boone	"Meant to Live"	Eliminated
Faith Becnel	"Cry Baby"	Eliminated
Arthur Gunn	"Iris"	Re-entered
DeWayne Crocker, Jr.	"Voice of God"	Eliminated
Makayla Phillips	"Anyone"	Eliminated
Olivia Ximines	"Say Yes"	Eliminated
Louis Knight	"Maybe That"	Eliminated

Non-competition performances
Performers	Song
Lionel Richie	"Say You, Say Me"
Harry Connick Jr.	"Alone With My Faith" "Old Time Religion"
Lauren Daigle	"Look Up Child"

=== Top 10 – Disney (May 2) ===
John Stamos was a guest mentor for the week. Each contestant performed one song from a Disney movie. Contestants are listed in the order they performed.

Top 10 (May 2)
Contestant	Song	Disney film	Result
Caleb Kennedy	"Real Gone"	Cars	Safe
Willie Spence	"Circle of Life"	The Lion King	Safe
Deshawn Goncalves	"When You Wish Upon a Star"	Pinocchio	Eliminated
Casey Bishop	"When She Loved Me"	Toy Story 2	Safe
Chayce Beckham	"Baby Mine"	Dumbo	Safe
Alyssa Wray	"A Dream Is a Wish Your Heart Makes"	Cinderella	Eliminated
Arthur Gunn	"Remember Me"	Coco	Safe
Cassandra Coleman	"Go the Distance"	Hercules	Eliminated
Hunter Metts	"You'll Be in My Heart"	Tarzan	Safe
Grace Kinstler	"Into the Unknown"	Frozen II	Safe

Non-competition performances
Performers	Song
Top 9 with Sofia Carson	"A Whole New World" (from Aladdin)
Jon Batiste	"It's All Right" (from Soul)

=== Top 7 – Coldplay & Mother's Day (May 9) ===
Chris Martin served as a guest mentor this week. Each contestant performed two songs: one song from the Coldplay discography and one song in honor of Mother's Day. Contestants are listed in the order they performed.

Top 7 (May 9, 2021)
Contestant	Order	Song	Result
Casey Bishop	1	"Paradise"	Safe
Casey Bishop	8	"Ironic"	Safe
Chayce Beckham	2	"Magic"	Safe
Chayce Beckham	9	"Mama"	Safe
Willie Spence	3	"Yellow"	Safe
Willie Spence	10	"You Are So Beautiful"	Safe
Caleb Kennedy	4	"Violet Hill"	Safe (Note: Caleb Kennedy withdrew from the competition after this week due to a personal controversy.)
Caleb Kennedy	11	"Mama Said"	Safe
Arthur Gunn	5	"In My Place"	Eliminated
Arthur Gunn	12	"Simple Man"	Eliminated
Grace Kinstler	6	"Fix You"	Safe
Grace Kinstler	13	"When We Were Young"	Safe
Hunter Metts	7	"Everglow"	Eliminated
Hunter Metts	14	"The River"	Eliminated

Non-competition performances
Performers	Song
Coldplay	"Higher Power"

=== Top 4 (May 16) ===
Finneas served as a guest mentor this week. Each contestant performed four songs: one song from their personal idol, their winner's single, a repeat of their favorite performance from the season, and one song from the Finneas discography performed as a duet with a fellow contestant.

Top 4 (May 16)
Contestant	Order	Song	Result
Chayce Beckham	1	"Colder Weather"	Safe
Chayce Beckham	5	"23"	Safe
Chayce Beckham	5	"You Should Probably Leave"	Safe
Casey Bishop	2	"Wish You Were Gay"	Eliminated
Casey Bishop	6	"Love Me, Leave Me"	Eliminated
Casey Bishop	6	"Live Wire"	Eliminated
Grace Kinstler	3	"A Moment Like This"	Safe
Grace Kinstler	8	"Love Someone"	Safe
Grace Kinstler	8	"Father"	Safe
Willie Spence	4	"Glory"	Safe
Willie Spence	9	"Never Be Alone"	Safe
Willie Spence	9	"I Was Here"	Safe
Grace Kinstler and Willie Spence	7	"What They'll Say About Us"	
Chayce Beckham and Casey Bishop	10	"Break My Heart Again"	

Non-competition performances
Ashe and Finneas	"Till Forever Falls Apart"
Luke Bryan	"Waves"

=== Top 3 – Finale (May 23) ===
Each contestant performed two songs–one song chosen by the judges and one song dedicated to the contestant's hometown – before the one contestant who had the fewest votes up to that point was eliminated, thereby finishing in third place. The remaining two contestants performed one last song as voting continued. Contestants are listed in the order they performed.

Top 3 (May 23)
Contestant	Order	Song	Result
Grace Kinstler	1	"All by Myself"	Third place
Grace Kinstler	4	"I Have Nothing"	Third place
Willie Spence	2	"Georgia on My Mind"	Runner-up
Willie Spence	5	"A Change Is Gonna Come"	Runner-up
Willie Spence	8	"Stand Up"	Runner-up
Chayce Beckham	3	"Blackbird"	Winner
Chayce Beckham	6	"Fire Away"	Winner
Chayce Beckham	7	"Afterglow"	Winner

Non-competition performances
Performers	Song
Top 3 with Macklemore	"Can't Hold Us"
Alyssa Wray with Mickey Guyton	"Black Like Me"
Tom McGovern	"Story of the Season"
Chayce Beckham, Willie Spence, Casey Bishop, and Arthur Gunn with Fall Out Boy	"My Songs Know What You Did in the Dark (Light Em Up)"
Grace Kinstler, Cassandra Coleman, Deshawn Goncalves, Alyssa Wray, and Ava August with Chaka Khan	"Sweet Thing" "I'm Every Woman" "Ain't Nobody"
Willie Spence with Leona Lewis	"You Are the Reason"
Graham DeFranco with Sheryl Crow	"If It Makes You Happy" "Everyday Is a Winding Road"
Murphy	"Am I Still Mine?" "The Painted Man"
Casey Bishop with Luke Bryan	"Livin' on a Prayer"
Top 8 with Lionel Richie	"One World"
Cassandra Coleman with Lindsey Buckingham	"Go Your Own Way"
Grace Kinstler with Alessia Cara	"Scars to Your Beautiful"
Chayce Beckham with Luke Combs	"Forever After All"
Hunter Metts with Katy Perry	"Thinking of You"
Chayce Beckham	"23"

== Elimination chart ==
Color key:

Winner
Runner-up
Third place
Did not perform
Saved by the public
Saved by the judges
Eliminated
Withdrew

American Idol (season 19) - Eliminations
Contestant	Pl.	Top 24		Top 16	Top 12	Comeback (Note: Ten contestants from last season were brought back to compete for a second chance in the competition.)	Top 10	Top 7	Top 4	Finale
Contestant	Pl.	4/4	4/5	4/11	4/18	4/19	5/2	5/9	5/16	5/23
Chayce Beckham	1	N/A	Safe	Safe	Safe	N/A	Safe	Safe	Safe	Winner
Willie Spence	2	Safe	N/A	Safe	Safe	N/A	Safe	Safe	Safe	Runner-up
Grace Kinstler	3	Safe	N/A	Safe	Safe	N/A	Safe	Safe	Safe	Third Place
Casey Bishop	4	N/A	Safe	Safe	Safe	N/A	Safe	Safe	Eliminated	
Caleb Kennedy	5	N/A	Safe	Safe	Safe	N/A	Safe	Withdrew (Note: Caleb Kennedy withdrew from the competition due to a personal controversy.)		
Arthur Gunn	6	Not in competition				Safe	Safe	Eliminated		
Hunter Metts	6	N/A	Safe	Safe	Safe	N/A	Safe	Eliminated		
Cassandra Coleman	8	Safe	N/A	Safe	Safe	N/A	Eliminated			
Deshawn Goncalves	8	Safe	N/A	Safe	Safe	N/A	Eliminated			
Alyssa Wray	8	Safe	N/A	Safe	Safe	N/A	Eliminated			
Beane	11	N/A	Safe	Saved	Eliminated					
Ava August	11	N/A	Safe	Safe	Eliminated					
Madison Watkins	11	N/A	Safe	Saved	Eliminated					
Graham DeFranco		Safe	N/A	Eliminated						
Colin Jamieson		N/A	Safe	Eliminated						
Alanis Sophia		Safe	N/A	Eliminated						
Wyatt Pike		Safe	N/A	Withdrew (Note: Wyatt Pike withdrew from the competition for personal reasons.)						
Hannah Everhart		N/A	Eliminated							
Liahona Olayan		N/A	Eliminated							
Jason Warrior		N/A	Eliminated							
Mary Jo Young		N/A	Eliminated							
Alana		Eliminated								
Anilee List		Eliminated								
Cecil Ray		Eliminated								
Andrea Valles		Eliminated								
Faith Becnel		Not in competition				Eliminated				
Franklin Boone		Not in competition				Eliminated				
DeWayne Crocker Jr.		Not in competition				Eliminated				
Cyniah Elise		Not in competition				Eliminated				
Aliana Jester		Not in competition				Eliminated				
Louis Knight		Not in competition				Eliminated				
Nick Merico		Not in competition				Eliminated				
Makayla Phillips		Not in competition				Eliminated				
Olivia Ximines		Not in competition				Eliminated				

== Ratings ==
Viewership and ratings per episode of American Idol season 19
No.	Title	Air date	Timeslot (ET)	Rating/share (18–49)	Viewers (millions)	DVR (18–49)	DVR viewers (millions)	Total (18–49)	Total viewers (millions)
1	"Auditions, Part 1"	February 14, 2021	Sunday 8:00 p.m.	1.2/7	6.95	0.3	1.76	1.5	8.72
2	"Auditions, Part 2"	February 21, 2021	Sunday 8:00 p.m.	1.0/6	6.67	0.3	1.65	1.3	8.34
3	"Auditions, Part 3"	February 28, 2021	Sunday 8:00 p.m.	1.0/6	6.61	0.3	1.56	1.3	8.17
4	"Auditions, Part 4"	March 7, 2021	Sunday 8:00 p.m.	0.8/5	5.29	0.3	1.55	1.1	6.85
5	"Auditions, Part 5"	March 14, 2021	Sunday 8:00 p.m.	0.8/5	5.50	0.3	1.53	1.1	7.04
6	"Hollywood Week: Genre Challenge"	March 21, 2021	Sunday 8:00 p.m.	0.8/5	5.64	—N/a	—N/a	—N/a	—N/a
7	"Hollywood Duets Challenge"	March 22, 2021	Monday 8:00 p.m.	0.7/5	4.94	—N/a	—N/a	—N/a	—N/a
8	"Showstopper/Final Judgment Part #1"	March 28, 2021	Sunday 8:00 p.m.	0.8/5	6.17	0.2	1.43	1.1	7.60
9	"Showstopper/Final Judgment Part #2"	March 29, 2021	Monday 8:00 p.m.	0.7/5	4.99	—N/a	—N/a	—N/a	—N/a
10	"All Star Duets and Solos, Part 1"	April 4, 2021	Sunday 8:00 p.m.	0.9/6	5.61	0.3	1.43	1.1	7.04
11	"All Star Duets and Solos, Part 2"	April 5, 2021	Monday 8:00 p.m.	0.7/4	4.72	—N/a	—N/a	—N/a	—N/a
12	"Top 16"	April 11, 2021	Sunday 8:00 p.m.	0.8/5	6.09	0.2	1.15	1.0	7.25
13	"Top 12 Live Reveal"	April 12, 2021	Monday 8:00 p.m.	0.8/5	5.38	0.3	1.32	1.0	6.71
14	"Oscar Nominated Songs"	April 18, 2021	Sunday 8:00 p.m.	0.8/5	5.44	0.2	1.24	1.0	6.67
15	"The Comeback"	April 19, 2021	Monday 8:00 p.m.	0.6/4	4.22	0.2	1.08	0.8	5.30
16	"Disney Night"	May 2, 2021	Sunday 8:00 p.m.	0.8/6	6.01	0.3	1.26	1.1	7.27
17	"Coldplay Songbook & Mother's Day Dedication"	May 9, 2021	Sunday 8:00 p.m.	0.9/6	5.74	0.3	1.34	1.2	7.08
18	"My Personal Idol/Artist Singles"	May 16, 2021	Sunday 8:00 p.m.	0.8/5	6.11	0.3	1.33	1.1	7.44
19	"Grand Finale"	May 23, 2021	Sunday 8:00 p.m.	0.9/6	6.50	0.1	0.84	1.0	7.35
