= Chayce Beckham =

American singer-songwriter (born 1996)

- Born: July 16, 1996 (age 30); Victorville, California, U.S.
- Origin: Apple Valley, California
- Genre: Country
- Occupations: Singer-songwriter; musician
- Instrument: Vocals, guitar
- Years active: 2021–present
- Labels: BMG; 19; Wheelhouse

Chayce Beckham (born July 16, 1996) (Note: Reply from @chaycebeckhammusic: Thank you guys! Love you all so much!) is an American singer-songwriter from Apple Valley, California, who rose to fame after winning the nineteenth season of the singing reality show American Idol.

== Early life ==
Beckham was born in Victorville, California, to Windie Petersen and spent his childhood in Victorville, Hesperia, and Apple Valley, California. He went to Carmel Elementary School in Hesperia, Vanguard Preparatory School and Sitting Bull Academy in Apple Valley, before moving to Glendora High School at the age of 12, and continuing at Whitcomb High School, where he graduated in 2014. He worked as a heavy machinery operator and formed a reggae band called the Sinking Sailors when he was 19 or 20. He cited Jim Morrison, Bob Marley, Bob Dylan, Johnny Cash, Waylon Jennings, Hank Williams Jr., and Hank Williams Sr. as his musical influences, In late 2020, two weeks before he auditioned for American Idol, he was involved in a near-fatal car wreck.

== American Idol ==
Beckham auditioned for the nineteenth season of the singing reality show American Idol in Los Angeles, California. After surviving Hollywood Week and making it into the Top 5, Beckham received the most votes to win, and on May 23, 2021, he was crowned the winner of the nineteenth season of American Idol, beating runner-up Willie Spence.

On American Idol, he performed "23", which he wrote a year prior, and the song reached No. 1 on the iTunes chart after he performed the song. The song was released as his single. The song made him the first Idol winner to do so with an original song.

Performances:
Week	Theme	Song(s)	Original artist(s)
Audition	Auditioner's Choice	"What Brings Life Also Kills"	Kolton Moore & The Clever Few
Hollywood Week, Round 1	Genre	"Hard Times"	Tyler Childers
Hollywood Week, Round 2	Duet	"July" (with Christina Daugherty)	Noah Cyrus
Top 64	Showstopper Round	"You Should Probably Leave"	Chris Stapleton
Top 24	Contestant's Choice	"Afterglow"	Ed Sheeran
Top 24	Contestant's Choice	"Drive" (with Brandon Boyd)	Incubus
Top 16	Contestant's Choice	"Waiting in Vain"	Bob Marley and The Wailers
Top 12	Oscar Nominated Songs	"(Everything I Do) I Do it For You"	Bryan Adams
Top 10	Disney Night	"Baby Mine"	Betty Noyes
Top 7	Coldplay	"Magic"	Coldplay
Top 7	Mother's Day	"Mama"	Chayce Beckham
Top 4	Personal Idol	"Colder Weather"	Zac Brown Band
Top 4	Winner's song	"23"	Chayce Beckham
Top 4	Reprise song	"You Should Probably Leave"	Chris Stapleton
Top 4	Duet	"Break My Heart Again" (with Casey Bishop)	Finneas O'Connell
Finale	Judges' Choice	"Blackbird"	The Beatles
Finale	Hometown Song	"Fire Away"	Chris Stapleton
Finale	Reprise Song	"Afterglow"	Ed Sheeran

Non-competition performances:
Collaborator(s)	Song	Original artist
Sofia Carson & American Idol Top 9	"A Whole New World"	Brad Kane and Lea Salonga
Macklemore & American Idol Top 3	"Can't Hold Us"	Macklemore & Ryan Lewis ft. Ray Dalton
Fall Out Boy & American Idol Top 4 Boys	"My Songs Know What You Did in the Dark (Light Em Up)"	Fall Out Boy
Lionel Richie & American Idol Top 8	"One World"	Lionel Richie
Luke Combs	"Forever After All"	Luke Combs
N/A	"23"	Chayce Beckham

== Discography ==
=== Studio albums ===
List of studio albums, with selected details
Title	Details
Bad for Me	Released: April 5, 2024; Label: Wheelhouse; Format: CD, Digital download

=== Extended plays ===
List of extended plays, with selected details
Title	Details
Doin’ It Right	Released: April 15, 2022; Label: Wheelhouse; Format: Digital download

=== Singles ===
List of singles, with selected chart positions, showing year released, certifications and album name
Title	Year	Peak chart positions					Certifications	Album
Title	Year	US	US Country	US Country Airplay	CAN	CAN Country	Certifications	Album
"Can't Do Without Me" (with Lindsay Ell)	2021	—	—	46	—	—		Non-album single
"23"	2023	45	8	1	42	1	RIAA: Platinum; ARIA: 2× Platinum; BPI: Silver; MC: 3× Platinum; RMNZ: Platinum	Bad for Me
"Everything I Need"	2024	—	—	36	—	44		Bad for Me
"—" denotes a recording that did not chart or was not released in that territory.

=== Promotional singles ===
List of promotional singles, showing year released and album name
Title	Year	Album
"Tell Me Twice"	2022	Doin' It Right
"Till the Day I Die"	2023	Non-album single
