= Bad for Me =

Bad for Me may refer to:

- "Bad for Me" (Meghan Trainor song), 2022
- "Bad for Me" (Megan and Liz song), 2012, from the EP Bad for Me
- Bad for Me (Dee Dee Bridgewater album), 1979
- Bad for Me (Chayce Beckham album), 2024
- "Bad for Me", a 2021 song by Tebey from the album The Good Ones
