= Willie Spence =

American singer (1999–2022)

Background information
- Born: June 18, 1999; West Palm Beach, Florida, U.S.
- Died: October 11, 2022 (aged 23) Jasper, Tennessee
- Occupation: Singer
- Years active: 2017–2022

Willie Spence (June 18, 1999 – October 11, 2022) was an American singer. He was the runner-up of the nineteenth season of American Idol at the age of 21.

== Background ==
Spence was born on June 18, 1999, in West Palm Beach, Florida and grew up in Douglas, Georgia northeast of Valdosta, Georgia.

He posted videos of him singing while in high school. In 2017, a video he had posted singing the Rihanna song "Diamonds" went viral on YouTube, receiving over 39 million views. He found significant attention, including an appearance on the talk show Steve, hosted by Steve Harvey. In 2021, Spence auditioned for the nineteenth season of American Idol. The judges gave him a positive reception, and Spence placed second in the competition behind Chayce Beckham.

== Death ==
Spence was killed in a car crash on Interstate 24 near Chattanooga, Tennessee on October 11, 2022, at 23 years old. His death was reported by the Marion County Sheriff's Office. According to WSB-TV in Atlanta, he was driving a Jeep Cherokee and veered off I-24 at around 4:00PM ET. His vehicle struck a tractor-trailer which was parked on the shoulder of the road. The truck driver was not injured.

The official Instagram account for American Idol reposted a video of Spence's audition for the show as a tribute. Beckham and Katharine McPhee, a contestant on the show's fifth season who had performed with Spence on the program, posted tributes to Spence on Instagram.
