= For Cryin' Out Loud! =

Studio album by Finneas
- Released: October 4, 2024
- Genre: Alternative rock
- Length: 39:56
- Labels: OYOY; Interscope
- Producer: Finneas

Finneas chronology
Vengeance (Original Motion Picture Soundtrack) (2022)	For Cryin' Out Loud! (2024)	Disclaimer (Apple TV+ Original Series Soundtrack) (2024)

Singles from For Cryin' Out Loud!
- 1. "For Cryin' Out Loud!" Released: August 8, 2024; 2. "Cleats" Released: September 13, 2024; 3. "Lotus Eater" Released: October 1, 2024

For Cryin' Out Loud! is the second studio album by American singer-songwriter Finneas. The album was released on October 4, 2024, through OYOY and Interscope. It is the follow-up record to his debut studio album, Optimist (2021).

== Background ==
During a May 2024 Rolling Stone cover story for Finneas's sister, Billie Eilish, Finneas revealed he was working on a new solo album. He described feeling lonely whilst solo-producing his first album, believing that he did an "OK job", but not making songs in the best possible way they could sound. Therefore, Finneas said, "I've made a point to be hyper-collaborative. Fortunately, most of my friends are producers".

On August 8, 2024, Finneas announced For Cryin' Out Loud! on Instagram and released the title track as its lead single, along with a music video directed by Isaac Ravishankara. A same-day press release characterized Finneas' creative process for the album as "steering things away from the bedroom producer mentality and to a classic studio/band environment". The album was produced during a series of live studio sessions in Los Angeles, California.

== Critical reception ==
According to the review aggregator Metacritic, For Cryin' Out Loud! received "generally favorable reviews" based on a weighted average score of 66 out of 100 from 5 critic scores.

== Track listing ==
All tracks are written by Finneas O'Connell, Aron Forbes, David Marinelli, Lucy Healey, Matthew Fildey, and Miles Morris except where noted.

For Cryin' Out Loud! track listing
No.	Title	Writer(s)	Length
1.	"Starfucker"	O'Connell	3:37
2.	"What's It Gonna Take to Break Your Heart?"		4:49
3.	"Cleats"		3:41
4.	"Little Window"		4:13
5.	"2001"		3:20
6.	"Same Old Story"		4:02
7.	"Sweet Cherries"	O'Connell; Forbes; Marinelli; Fildey; Morris; Sam Homaee	5:13
8.	"For Cryin' Out Loud!"	O'Connell; Forbes; Marinelli; Fildey; Morris	3:37
9.	"Family Feud"	O'Connell; Forbes; Marinelli; Healey; Fildey; Morris; Homaee	3:33
10.	"Lotus Eater"	O'Connell; Forbes; Marinelli; Healey; Fildey; Morris; Homaee	3:51
Total length:			39:56

== Personnel ==
Musicians

- Finneas O'Connell – lead vocals, keyboards, percussion (all tracks); synthesizer (tracks 1, 3–7, 9, 10), guitar (3, 4, 8), bass guitar (4, 8–10)
- Aron Forbes – bass guitar (tracks 1–8, 10), guitar (9)
- Miles Morris – drums (all tracks), baritone guitar (9)
- Lucy Healey – keyboards, vocals (all tracks); synthesizer (track 5)
- David Marinelli – percussion (all tracks), synthesizer (1, 2, 6, 7), keyboards (2–10), programming (7, 8), vocals (9, 10)
- Matthew Fildey – guitar (tracks 1–3, 5, 7–10), pedal steel (1, 4, 6, 7), synthesizer (4)
- Sam Homaee – synthesizer (tracks 7, 9, 10), percussion (7), guitar (9)
- Jesse McGinty – French horn, tenor saxophone, trombone, trumpet (track 8)

Technical

- Finneas – production, recording
- Dale Becker – mastering
- Jon Castelli – mixing
- Aron Forbes – engineering, recording
- Brad Lauchert – mix engineering
- Katie Harvey – mastering assistance
- Noah McCorkle – mastering assistance

== Charts ==
Chart performance for For Cryin' Out Loud!
Chart (2024)	Peak position
Australian Albums (ARIA)	56
Austrian Albums (Ö3 Austria)	48
Belgian Albums (Ultratop Flanders)	10
Belgian Albums (Ultratop Wallonia)	67
Dutch Albums (Album Top 100)	9
German Albums (Offizielle Top 100)	33
Lithuanian Albums (AGATA)	60
New Zealand Albums (RMNZ)	31
Scottish Albums (Official Charts)	18
Swiss Albums (Schweizer Hitparade)	52
UK Albums (Official Charts)	35
US Billboard 200	82
US Top Rock & Alternative Albums (Billboard)	18
