= I Lost a Friend =

2019 single by Finneas

Single by Finneas

from the EP Blood Harmony
- Released: May 3, 2019
- Genre: Electropop
- Length: 3:57
- Label: OYOY
- Songwriter: Finneas O'Connell
- Producer: Finneas

Finneas singles chronology
"Claudia" (2019)	"I Lost a Friend" (2019)	"Angel" (2019)

Music video
- "I Lost a Friend" on YouTube

Alternative cover

"I Lost a Friend" is a song by American singer-songwriter Finneas from his debut EP, Blood Harmony (2019). The song was written and produced solely by Finneas. It was released as the second single from the EP on May 3, 2019, through OYOY. An electropop ballad, the song's lyrics address Finneas losing touch with a childhood friend and regretting doing so, as well as wondering why he didn't do anything about it.

The song received mainly positive reviews from music critics, several of whom praised the music and production. An accompanying music video was uploaded to Finneas' YouTube channel on September 30, 2019, and was directed by Sam Bennett. In the visual, Finneas wanders around a field as the day turns into night. Finneas performed "I Lost a Friend" on Jimmy Kimmel Live! in December 2019. A remix of the song by Marian Hill was released on December 13, 2019.

== Background and development ==
In an interview with WBUR-FM, Finneas explained the song is an autobiographical about a friendship he had that lasted all through high school and had fallen apart. He said, "We were still best friends, and I felt that there was sort of a raw patch [and] some form of resentment or maybe misguided envy. At the time, I wasn't really sure how to deal with that, but I decided that it was probably best to try to write a song about it and not write a song that was vilifying that person in any way or trying to make myself look like the victim."

He continued by saying the song is about losing someone you love for no reason and wondering who or what is to blame. Finneas told Coup de Main that he was nervous putting out "I Lost a Friend" because it was about an old friend with whom he had reunited again. Finneas would explain that he knew his friend going to hear the song, so he sent it to him first to get his opinion. Finneas told his friend: "This is how I was feeling at the time, and I'm glad to have you back in my life."

The song's cover art was created by graphic designer Luke and features a beat-up car in a junkyard. Finneas wrote the song during an afternoon while he was at his parents' house in the summer of 2018. "I Lost a Friend" was released for digital download and streaming as the second single from Finneas' debut EP Blood Harmony through his record label OYOY on May 3, 2019. The track was written and produced by Finneas. A remix by Marian Hill was released on December 13, 2019.

== Composition and lyrics ==
Ben Kaye of Consequence of Sound described "I Lost a Friend" as an electropop ballad. "I Lost a Friend" features minimalist instrumentation that consists of bass guitar, piano, drums, layered harmonies, an aggressive beat, and synthesizer.

Finneas later explained the production in an interview with Pitchfork, saying: "The coolest thing I felt that I found was I had this flute patch that I arpeggiated. [It] sounded kind of percussive ultimately, just in its kind of high end. Having it in this super staccato, randomized, playing a larger scale than it would actually be played on. And that kind of allowed it to build momentum. On the impact of the second chorus, the thing that ended up really making the difference was this sound of [an] RPG going off. That textural sound of all the glass breaking to me is so much more interesting than a crash on a cymbal." He told Rolling Stone the process of writing the song was a "talk-through", which meant he tried to find rhymes after setting up a line. Finneas showcases the process in the pre-chorus: "I know I'll be alright/But I'm not tonight/I'll be lying awake/Counting all the mistakes I've made/Replaying fights." He discussed the pre-chorus further, saying how common it is for him and others to stay awake at night "replaying fights", and also said, "I find that when I'm in an argument and I'm angry, I can't even form a sentence well."

== Critical reception ==
"I Lost a Friend" was met with mainly positive reviews from music critics. Nicole Almeida of Atwood Magazine labeled the track a "slow burning introduction to [Blood Harmony] and an emotional punch that stops you on your tracks". Ben Kaye, writing for Consequence of Sound, called the track "thoughtful" and "heartful". Brittany Spanos of Rolling Stone said the track "carries a universal appeal with many fans of the song messaging him about their own friend break-ups in recent months". For NME, Will Richards was less positive towards the song, saying it "starts as a run-of-the-mill, earnest singer-songwriter tune, but soars towards the end of stabs of distorted bass," comparing "I Lost a Friend" to Billie Eilish's debut studio album When We All Fall Asleep, Where Do We Go? (2019).

Marian Hill's remix was praised by critics. Rania Aniftos of Billboard described it as a "sultry remix" and stated that the remix shifts "the velvety piano melody into a light, airy beat". Claire Shaffer and Althea Legaspi of Rolling Stone noted that while the original features a "contemplative piano melody", the remix "opens with his emotive vocals at the fore, which also get some remix manipulations on the harmonies, and the beats and atmospheric touches lightly buoy his refrains".

== Music video and promotion ==
A music video for "I Lost a Friend" was uploaded to Finneas' YouTube channel on June 25, 2019. The video was directed by Sam Bennett and shot in one take in Lancaster, California. In the visual, Finneas wanders drunkenly through a field as the sunset lowers and darkness approaches, wearing a suit and tie. While Finneas continues to across the field, human forms rise and stumble to follow him as he tries to understand what he has done wrong, singing, "How'd the hell I lose a friend I never had?" The visual was met with positive reviews from critics. Rachel Hammermueller of Earmilk commended the visual, saying it has "haunting choreography throughout its one take", noting the choreography for "images that represent the emotion and struggle behind the words of the song itself". Writing for Paste, Molly Schramm praised the choreography, saying it acts more as a "lyrical dance than a drunken stupor".

Finneas played "I Lost a Friend" on piano for Paste in June 2019. He toured across the United States during October 2019, in support of Blood Harmony. "I Lost a Friend" was one of the tracks Finneas performed from the EP on the tour. That same month, Finneas performed "I Lost a Friend" at the Austin City Limits Music Festival and was backed up by a live band. In December 2019, Finneas performed the track on Jimmy Kimmel Live!. He performed while sat at a keyboard, with the stage being covered in blue as neon lights showcased an empty apartment set. in hushed vocals, and briefly wandered off the stage during the performance before returning to the keyboard.

== Certifications ==
Region	Certification	Certified units/sales
Canada (Music Canada)	Gold	40,000^{‡}
^{‡} Sales+streaming figures based on certification alone.
