= 23 (Chayce Beckham song) =

Single by Chayce Beckham

from the album Bad for Me
- Released: May 14, 2021
- Genre: Country
- Length: 3:48; 3:06 (steel mix)
- Label: Wheelhouse
- Songwriter: Chayce Beckham
- Producer: Ross Copperman • Redah

Chayce Beckham singles chronology
"Can't Do Without Me" (2021)	"23" (2021)	"Everything I Need" (2024)

"23" is a song by American country music singer Chayce Beckham. It was released to country radio on January 23, 2023, and served as the lead single from his debut album, Bad for Me. Beckham wrote the song by himself.

== Content and history ==
"23" was released to country radio on January 23, 2023. The song is an autobiographical story written entirely by Beckham. Lyrically, it tells of his own struggles with alcoholism. According to Beckham, the idea for the song came when, prior to his audition for American Idol, he was involved in a drunk driving incident.

== Commercial performance ==
"23" reached number one on the Billboard Country Airplay chart dated April 6, 2024, making it the first country number one to be written solely by the artist who performed it since Taylor Swift's "Ours" in March 2012.

== Charts ==
=== Weekly charts ===
Weekly chart performance for "23"
Chart (2023–2024)	Peak position
Canada (Canadian Hot 100)	42
Canada Country (Billboard)	1
UK Country Airplay (Radiomonitor)	6
US Billboard Hot 100	45
US Adult Pop Airplay (Billboard)	31
US Country Airplay (Billboard)	1
US Hot Country Songs (Billboard)	8

=== Year-end charts ===
2024 year-end chart performance for "23"
Chart (2024)	Position
US Country Airplay (Billboard)	25
US Hot Country Songs (Billboard)	39

== Certifications ==
Certifications for "23"
Region	Certification	Certified units/sales
Australia (ARIA)	2× Platinum	140,000^{‡}
Canada (Music Canada)	3× Platinum	240,000^{‡}
New Zealand (RMNZ)	Platinum	30,000^{‡}
United Kingdom (BPI)	Silver	200,000^{‡}
United States (RIAA)	Platinum	1,000,000^{‡}
^{‡} Sales+streaming figures based on certification alone.
