= Caleb Kennedy =

American country singer-songwriter

Caleb Kennedy is an American country singer-songwriter from Roebuck, South Carolina. He was a contestant on American Idol season 19.

== Early life ==
Kennedy is from Roebuck, South Carolina. He attended Dorman High School and took carpentry courses at the R. D. Anderson Applied Technology Center in Moore, South Carolina.

Kennedy began playing guitar and writing songs at a young age. His mother, Anita Guy, supported his early passion for music, frequently dropping him off in downtown Spartanburg, where he would perform on Main Street. Kennedy performed covers of songs and his own original material. Kennedy's songwriting drew inspiration from his personal experiences and surroundings, often reflecting his upbringing and the people in his life. One notable example is the song "That's My Papa," a tribute to his grandfather Rudy Blanton.

== Career ==
In 2021, Kennedy competed on American Idol season 19. For his audition, he performed an original song titled "Nowhere," which received praise from the judges. Katy Perry encouraged him to finish the song, commenting on its potential. His performances throughout the competition showcased his blend of traditional country influences and contemporary storytelling. Kennedy advanced to the Top 5 contestants before leaving the show in May 2021, following the resurfacing of a controversial Snapchat video showing him at the age of 12 sitting next to a person wearing what appeared to be a Ku Klux Klan hood.

Kennedy's songwriting remained a central focus of his artistry. He described his creative process as aiming to evoke emotion and tell a story, often drawing from personal experiences. After his time on American Idol, he wrote songs that addressed the challenges he faced in the spotlight, incorporating themes of self-reflection and growth. He played at venues across the Southeastern United States, including his hometown's Music on Main series in Spartanburg. His set list included covers and original songs reflecting country and southern rock songs influences including "Simple Man" and "Soulshine." He collaborated with country musicians, such as Brandon Kinney, during trips to Nashville, Tennessee. In August 2021, Kennedy participated in local community events, sharing his musical journey with young participants.

== Personal life ==
In February 2022, Kennedy was involved in a fatal driving under the influence (DUI) crash in Spartanburg County. He was charged with driving under the influence resulting in death, as the incident led to the death of a 54-year-old man. Toxicology reports indicated the presence of THC and Prozac in his system, and Kennedy admitted to using a vaping device shortly before the crash.

In 2024, Kennedy pleaded guilty to the charges and was sentenced to eight years in prison, with three of those years to be served under home detention. He was also fined and required to undergo probation, random drug testing, and mental health counseling.
