= Shelter (Finneas song) =

2019 single by Finneas

Single by Finneas

from the EP Blood Harmony
- Released: August 22, 2019
- Recorded: 2016
- Genre: Pop
- Length: 3:07
- Label: OYOY
- Songwriter(s): Finneas O'Connell
- Producer(s): Finneas

Finneas singles chronology
"Angel" (2019)	"Shelter" (2019)	"I Don't Miss You at All" (2019)

Music video
- "Shelter" on YouTube

"Shelter" is a song by American singer-songwriter Finneas from his debut EP, Blood Harmony (2019). The song was released by OYOY as the third single from the EP on August 22, 2019. Finneas had heard that Avicii was looking for songs to produce. Afterwards, he wrote the song and sent it to Avicii's team. Lyrically, the song is about a lover that brings Finneas peace, but also trouble.

The song received mainly positive reviews from music critics, several of whom praised the music and lyrical content. A music video for "Shelter" was uploaded to Finneas' YouTube channel on September 30, 2019, and was directed by Sam Bennett. In it, Finneas stumbles as backup dancers shove and toss him roughly. Finneas toured the United States throughout October 2019 to support Blood Harmony, with the tour including performances of the song.

== Background and composition ==
"Shelter" was first written back in 2016 by Finneas. He had heard that Swedish musician Avicii was looking for songs to produce. Following on from this, Finneas wrote the track and sent it to Avicii's team. Finneas has confessed that he doesn't know if Avicii ever heard it. "Shelter" was released as the third single from Finneas' debut EP Blood Harmony for digital download and streaming, through his record label OYOY on August 22, 2019. The track was written and produced by Finneas.

Critical commentary described "Shelter" as a pop-based track. The track features a tropical beat, electric guitar, Latin-based guitars, drum beats, gospel choir effect[s] that appear during the chorus, reverb'd handclaps, bluesy vocal embellishment, and rapid phrasing in the bridge. Tosten Burks, writing for Spin magazine, noted the track sounds like an Ed Sheeran song. He further commented that the track is built around some "urgent acoustic guitar strumming" and a "plucky melody" which is very similar to the marimba line in Sheeran's number one hit "Shape of You" (2017), and is set in a dance tempo. Lyrically, the track is about a lover that brings Finneas peace but has an undercurrent of trouble. He represents the trouble with the lyrics, "They call us lucky/But I think we might be cursed/'Cause the way you love me/I could drink the river dry, still die of thirst". The mood of the track becomes more urgent as it continues: "Give me, give me shelter/From the storm/Give me, give me shelter/ Keep me warm/I don't wanna think about a life without you/I don't wanna go to war but I'm about to".

== Critical reception ==
"Shelter" was met with mainly positive reviews from music critics. Writing for Substream Magazine, Valerie Magan described the track as "vulnerable", "heartbreak-tinged" and "easygoing". Ben Kay of Consequence of Sound noted that "Shelter" was "considerably brighter than the material [Finneas] produces for his sister Billie Eilish". Madeline Roth of MTV labeled the track as a "galvanic, acoustic guitar-driven number". Will Richards of NME called the song "vibrant" and "huffling", while mentioning that its "production saves its average lyrics". Nicole Almeida of Atwood Magazine stated that the song it "prolongs the theme of love, and is a high energy, radio-ready take on seeing someone as your safe haven", and he called the production on the song a "remarkable offering a fresh take on a pop anthem about being way too deep in love". Writing for the American Songwriter, Paul Zollow labeled the track as "buoyant" and "uptempo". Tanis Smither of Earmilk mentioned the song has an "infectious energy".

== Promotion ==
A music video for "Shelter" was directed by Sam Bennett and was uploaded to Finneas' YouTube channel on September 30, 2019. The video was directed by Sam Bennett and choreographed by Monika Felice Smith, while it was shot in one take. The visual begins with Finneas frantically walking along the Los Angeles river as groups of dancers try to interrupt his journey. "They call us lucky / But I think we might be cursed / 'Cause the way you love me / I could drink the river dry, still die of thirst." Finneas cries as the dancers try to tug and toss him roughly around the empty riverbed, as well as mobbing him. Roth compared the visual to the 1978 film '"Grease, while praising the choreography, which she described as "elaborate" and "impressive".

Finneas toured throughout the United States during October 2019, in support of Blood Harmony. "Shelter" was one of the tracks from the EP that he performed live during the tour. In October 2019, Finneas performed "Shelter" at the Austin City Limits Music Festival, being backed up by a live band.
