= Blood Harmony =

EP by Finneas
- Released: October 4, 2019
- Genre: Pop
- Length: 23:18
- Label: OYOY
- Producer: Finneas

Finneas chronology
Blood Harmony (2019)	Optimist (2021)

Singles from Blood Harmony
- 1. "Let's Fall in Love for the Night" Released: October 19, 2018; 2. "I Lost a Friend" Released: May 3, 2019; 3. "Shelter" Released: August 22, 2019; 4. "I Don't Miss You at All" Released: September 20, 2019

Blood Harmony is the debut extended play by American singer-songwriter Finneas. It was released by his record label OYOY, distributed by AWAL, on October 4, 2019. All of the material on the EP was produced and written by Finneas.

Blood Harmony was supported by the release of four singles, from 2018 to 2019. The lead single, "Let's Fall in Love for the Night" peaked at numbers 17 and 24 on the US Billboard Alternative Songs and Rock Airplay charts, respectively. Finneas toured the United States throughout October 2019 in support of the EP. A deluxe edition was released on August 7, 2020, featuring the 2018 single "Break My Heart Again" and a new version of "Let's Fall in Love for the Night" entitled "Let's Fall in Love for the Night (1964)". The EP peaked at number 14 on the US Heatseekers Albums chart and number 47 on the Lithuanian Albums chart.

== Background and release ==
Finneas teased Blood Harmony in August 2019. The EP marked Finneas' first solo release after co-writing and producing material for his sister Billie Eilish for several years. He expressed a desire for the "title to remain ambiguous to listeners, and for everyone to be able to imbue it with their own meaning and justification", but clarified that "blood harmony" is an "expression for what it sounds like when siblings sing together, that biologic chemistry — I think that speaks for itself".

== Composition and lyrics ==
Blood Harmony is primarily a pop record. The EP opens with "I Lost a Friend", an electropop ballad. The song features minimalist production of bass guitar, piano, drums, layered harmonies, an aggressive beat, and synthesizer. Lyrically, it addresses the pain and confusion when losing a friend. The following track, "Shelter", is a pop-based track. The track features a tropical beat, electric guitar, Latin-based guitars, drum beats, gospel choir effect[s] that appear during the chorus, reverb'd handclaps, bluesy vocal embellishment, and rapid phrasing in the bridge. Lyrically, "Shelter" is about a love for a girl that brings Finneas peace but has an undercurrent of trouble. Tosten Burks, writing for Spin magazine, compared the track to the works of Ed Sheeran. "Lost My Mind" is a more subdued track. Lyrically, Finneas realizes he is in love and wonders if his feelings are really true.

"I Don't Miss You at All" was described as a "longing" dark pop track. It sees Finneas sing about F. Scott Fitzgerald, the author of the 1925 classic novel The Great Gatsby, and express his desire to reunite with his past lover while getting angry when the past seemingly blends gets into the present. "Partners in Crime" addresses a story of a dangerous and fading love, and reveals the result of buying into Hollywood stereotypes of intertwining love and thrill-seeking. "Let's Fall in Love for the Night" is a pop track. The song's lyrics are about a girl Finneas has never met in person but finds comfort by dreaming about being together with her in an alternate universe, but only temporarily. Blood Harmony closes with "Die Alone", a romantic meditation about love.

The deluxe edition of Blood Harmony contains two extra tracks. "Break My Heart Again" is an indie pop ballad. The sound of typing and sending messages is heard for the majority of the song, with it being almost entirely composed of real texts between Finneas and a former lover. Lyrically, Finneas confesses to being constantly hurt by the one he cares about. An alternative version of "Let's Fall in Love for the Night", titled "Let's Fall in Love for the Night (1964)", is a lullaby-influenced track. Critical commentary noted the influence of Frank Sinatra.

== Release and promotion ==
Blood Harmony was released by Finneas' record label OYOY, and distributed by AWAL, on October 4, 2019. A deluxe edition of the EP was released on August 7, 2020. "Let's Fall in Love for the Night" was released as the lead single from Blood Harmony on October 19, 2018. Although the song did not chart initially, it became a sleeper hit in 2020, peaking at number 17 and 24 on the US Billboard Alternative Songs and Rock Airplay charts, respectively. It has received a gold certification in Canada by Music Canada (MC), which denotes track-equivalent sales of forty-thousand units based on sales and streams. A music video for the track was released on March 19, 2020, and received its broadcast on MTV Live, MTVU, MTV International, and the Viacom Times Square Billboards. The music video was shot in one take and directed by Sam Bennett, while choreographed by Monika Felice Smith. "I Lost a Friend" was released on May 3, 2019, as the second single from Blood Harmony. An accompanying music video was released on June 25, 2019, and was also directed by Bennett and shot in one take in Lanchester, California. The song received a remix by Marian Hill, which was released on December 13, 2019. The EP's third single, "Shelter", was released on August 22, 2019. A music video for "Shelter" was directed by Bennett on September 30, 2019. It was also shot in one take. "I Don't Miss You at All" was released as the fourth and final single from Blood Harmony on September 30, 2019.

=== Live performances ===
Finneas promoted Blood Harmony with a series of public appearances and televised live performances. He toured throughout the United States during October 2019, in support of Blood Harmony. That same month, Finneas performed a majority of Blood Harmony's songs at the Austin City Limits Music Festival. In December 2019, Finneas performed "I Lost a Friend" and "I Don't Miss You at All" on Jimmy Kimmel Live!. On February 3, 2020, he performed "Let's Fall in Love for the Night" on The Tonight Show Starring Jimmy Fallon and was joined by a live band.

== Reception ==
Professional ratings
Review scores
Source	Rating
NME	4/5 stars

Will Richards writing for NME, said the songs on Blood Harmony are "exquisite" and have an update "with fresh, modern production tweaks". For Billboard magazine, Glenn Rowley praised the EP, saying "Finneas' work as a solo artist is decidedly brighter, his soulful voice tying each song together as his lyrics swings through the vast spectrum of human emotion". Nicole Almeida of Atwood Magazine wrote that Blood Harmony is the "most transitional point of Finneas' career". She continued, saying the EP is a "songwriting and production triumph". Blood Harmony was a commercial underperformance, peaking at number 14 on the US Billboard Heatseekers Albums chart and number 47 on the Lithuanian Albums chart.

== Track listing ==
All tracks are written by Finneas.

Blood Harmony standard edition
No.	Title	Length
1.	"I Lost a Friend"	3:57
2.	"Shelter"	3:07
3.	"Lost My Mind"	2:49
4.	"I Don't Miss You at All"	2:08
5.	"Partners in Crime"	3:43
6.	"Let's Fall in Love for the Night"	3:10
7.	"Die Alone"	4:21
Total length:		23:18

Blood Harmony deluxe edition
No.	Title	Length
8.	"Break My Heart Again"	3:58
9.	"Let's Fall in Love for the Night (1964)"	3:57
Total length:		31:13

== Personnel ==
- Finneas – production
- Justin Hergett – mixing
- John Greenham – mastering
- Luke Fenstemaker – cover art, design

== Charts ==
Chart performance for Blood Harmony
Chart (2019–2020)	Peak position
Lithuanian Albums (AGATA)	47
US Heatseekers Albums (Billboard)	14
