= I Don't Miss You at All =

2019 single by Finneas

Single by Finneas

from the EP Blood Harmony
- Released: September 20, 2019
- Genre: Pop
- Length: 2:08
- Label: OYOY
- Songwriter(s): Finneas
- Producer(s): Finneas

Finneas singles chronology
"Shelter" (2019)	"I Don't Miss You at All" (2019)	"What They'll Say About Us" (2020)

"I Don't Miss You at All" is a song by American singer-songwriter Finneas from his debut EP, Blood Harmony (2019). It was released by OYOY as the fourth and final single from the EP on September 20, 2019. The dark pop track was written and produced by Finneas himself. The song received mainly positive reviews from music critics, several of whom praised the music and lyrical content. During his October 2019 United States tour, the singer performed the song. He also sang it on Jimmy Kimmel Live! and during a livestream for Verizon Communications.

== Background and release ==
"I Don't Miss You at All" was released for digital download and streaming on September 20, 2019, as the fourth and final single from Finneas' debut EP Blood Harmony, through his record label OYOY. The track was written and produced by Finneas. Finneas explained in a statement that the song is about "trying to convince yourself that you're over someone. Remembering all your absolute favorite things about them and pretending they mean nothing to you now". Finneas wrote "I Don't Miss You at All" while touring in New York City. He was sitting on a hotel bed while playing a toy guitar he had bought in Boston. He intended to write a song that felt like it was "entirely a lie, the way [we] all lie to [ourselves] to try to feel like [we're] over someone when [we're] definitely, definitely not".

== Composition and lyrics ==
Gil Kaufman of Billboard described the track's genre as "longing" dark pop. "I Don't Miss You at All" mentions F. Scott Fitzgerald, the author of the 1925 classic novel The Great Gatsby. Throughout the book, Fitzgerald repeatedly refers to a green light, which represents the undying love Jay Gatsby felt for Daisy Buchanan, and the possibility of living happily ever after. "I Don't Miss You All" features a synthesizer line that is used for the entire song. In the lyrics, Finneas expresses the same desire to reunite with his past lover and gets angry when the past gets into the present: "And I'm sleepin' fine. I don't mean to boast/But I only dream about you/Once or twice a night at most/And it feels so good/Eating alone/I don't get distracted by your smile/And miss the green lights drivin' home."

== Reception and promotion ==
Nicole Almeida writing for Atwood Magazine labeled the track as a "cheeky and ironic song about getting over an ex.". Heran Mamo of Billboard described the song as a "not-so-broody bop." "I Don't Miss You at All" was included on the setlist of Finneas October 2019 United States tour, in support of Blood Harmony. Finneas played an acoustic version of the song for KROQ-FM. In December 2019, Finneas performed the track on Jimmy Kimmel Live!. While he sang, he stumble-danced across the stage. In March 2020, Finneas sent a video to Digital Fort of him playing the song on his Spanish guitar while sitting on a couch. In April of the same year, Finneas performed an acoustic version of it during a 50-minute livestream for Verizon Communications.
