= Bad for Me (Chayce Beckham album) =

Studio album by Chayce Beckham
- Released: April 5, 2024
- Genre: Country
- Length: 44:38
- Label: Wheelhouse
- Producer: Bart Butler; Ross Copperman

Singles from Bad for Me
- 1. "23" Released: January 23, 2023; 2. "Everything I Need" Released: April 29, 2024

Bad for Me is the debut studio album by American country music singer Chayce Beckham. It was released on April 5, 2024, via Wheelhouse. "23" was issued in January 2023 as the lead single, and became Beckham's first number one hit on the Billboard Country Airplay chart.

== Background ==
Bart Butler produced the album, with the exception of "23", which Ross Copperman produced. Beckham wrote or co-wrote nine of the album's 13 tracks, citing influence from the likes of Townes Van Zandt, Blaze Foley, George Strait, and George Jones. He described his goal with the album: "Hopefully somebody who needs to hear one of these songs gets to hear it. If it just gets to one person who needs to hear one of these songs to feel better or get them through whatever they're going through, that's always been my mission and my end goal with music. It’s helped me out so much and made me feel so much better when I was having a hard time. I just hope that it can get out to the people who need it and it can change people’s lives like it changed mine. That's all I can ask for."

"23" was released as the lead single. It reached number one on the Billboard Country Airplay chart dated April 6, 2024, making it the first country number one to be written solely by the artist who performed it since Taylor Swift's "Ours" in March 2012.

"Everything I Need" was released as the second single on April 29, 2024. It debuted at number 57 on the Billboard Country Airplay chart in June.

== Track listing ==
Bad for Me track listing
No.	Title	Writer(s)	Length
1.	"Devil I've Been"	Chayce Beckham; John Pierce; Lindsay Rimes	3:28
2.	"Addicted and Clean"	Beckham; Emily Landis; Justin Morgan	4:00
3.	"Waylon in '75"	Brett James; Parker McCollum; Lee Thomas Miller; Jon Randall	3:20
4.	"Bad for Me"	Tyler Chambers; Joe Fox; Randy Montana	3:24
5.	"Drink You Off My Mind"	Beckham	3:31
6.	"Everything I Need"	Beckham; Pierce; Rimes	3:31
7.	"Whiskey Country"	Beckham; Pierce; Rimes	3:26
8.	"Glitter"	Natalie Hemby; Joey Hendricks; Mark Trussell	3:18
9.	"Smokin' Weed and Drinkin' Whiskey"	Andy Albert; Beckham; Trussell	2:35
10.	"Something Worth Holding On To"	Brandon Kinney; Pierce; Micah Wilshire	3:23
11.	"Mama"	Beckham	3:39
12.	"If I Had a Week"	Beckham; Scooter Carusoe	3:10
13.	"23"	Beckham	3:48
Total length:			44:38
