= Can't Wait to Be Dead =

2020 single by Finneas

Single by Finneas
- Released: October 21, 2020
- Genre: Alternative rock
- Length: 2:55
- Label: OYOY
- Songwriter: Finneas
- Producer: Finneas

Finneas singles chronology
"What They'll Say About Us" (2020)	"Can't Wait to Be Dead" (2020)	"Where The Poison Is" (2020)

"Can't Wait to Be Dead" is a song by American singer-songwriter Finneas. It was released by OYOY as a single on October 21, 2020. The song was written and produced by Finneas.

It was lyrically inspired on how the internet and media were reacting during the ongoing COVID-19 pandemic and the 2020 US presidential debate. The uptempo-based alternative rock song sees Finneas singing about the effects of racism and how he feels about the Internet. A music video for "Can't Wait to Be Dead" was produced by Constellation Jones and released on October 22, 2020.

== Background ==
Finneas explained in a statement: "I'm happy for this song to mean anything to anyone who listens to it, but to me, it's a song about my relationship with the Internet. Especially in an election year. Especially during a pandemic. Sometimes, the internet makes me laugh, sometimes it makes me cry, sometimes it makes me hopeful. But sometimes, it really makes me wanna be dead."

== Composition and lyrics ==
"Can't Wait to Be Dead" features use of a folk-based "intimate" acoustic guitar. The song is an uptempo-based alternative rock track. Lyrically, "Can't Wait to Be Dead" is about Finneas' view on how the Internet is acting during the COVID-19 pandemic and 2020 presidential election, "Another sunburn with hair, it's too much fun not to stare/Somebody's calling you out for something you never said". He then sings about the racism in the U.S.: "Fuck your Confederate flag/You've got no reason to brag". Finneas repeats how the Internet is acting, "Nobody's coming to save me/Nobody knows any better anyway/I think we're thinking the same thing/If this is how it ends, I wasn't listening".

== Reception ==
Nina Corcoran, writing for Consequence of Sound, praised the track, saying it "packs plenty of energy without letting its message go stale". Writing for Spin magazine, Emily Tan said Finneas continues to "prove himself as a songwriter with the release of 'Can't Wait to Be Dead'".

== Music video ==
A music video for "Can't Wait to Be Dead" was released on October 22, 2020, and was produced by Constellation Jones. Finneas hinted of the music video during a livestream. Towards the end of the livestream, he explained the idea of the track's visual, saying, "When I write songs, I don't like to write a song that feels like it's only about one thing, even if it is, because I want every person that listens to it to be able to internalize it and have it translate it to whatever experience they're going through is. That being said, I think music videos are a fun way to articulate exactly what the song means to you. To me, this song is just about my relationship with the internet, so that's the premise of this video." The video shows Finneas scrolling through social media, with the shot sometimes showing his reflection. As he scrolls through the phone, it shows protests, the US election, and the COVID-19 pandemic.
