= Let's Fall in Love for the Night =

2018 single by Finneas

Single by Finneas

from the EP Blood Harmony
- Released: October 19, 2018
- Genre: Pop
- Length: 3:10
- Label: OYOY
- Songwriter: Finneas O'Connell
- Producer: Finneas

Finneas singles chronology
"Luck Pusher" (2018)	"Let's Fall in Love for the Night" (2018)	"Claudia" (2019)

Music video
- "Let's Fall in Love for the Night" on YouTube

"Let's Fall in Love for the Night" is a song by American singer-songwriter Finneas from his debut extended play (EP), Blood Harmony (2019). It was released by OYOY as the lead single from the EP on October 19, 2018. A pop track, the song's lyrics are about a boy dreaming about being with a girl he has never met and wanting to be with her in another world. In August 2020, Finneas released a different version of the track, titled "Let's Fall in Love for the Night (1964)", on the deluxe version of the EP, on August 7, 2020. Music critics have compared it to the work of Frank Sinatra.

Commercially, "Let's Fall in Love for the Night" peaked at number 17 and 24 on the US Billboard Alternative Songs and Rock Airplay charts, respectively. It has received a gold certification by the Recording Industry Association of America (RIAA), Music Canada (MC) and ARIA. A music video for the track was uploaded to Finneas' YouTube channel on March 19, 2020 and was directed by Sam Bennett. In it, Finneas goes from playing the ukulele on a rooftop in Los Angeles to performing choreography with several dancers. Finneas toured the United States throughout October 2019, with his tour including performances of the track.

== Background and development ==
"Let's Fall in Love for the Night" was released as the lead single on Finneas' debut extended play (EP), Blood Harmony, for digital download and streaming through his record label OYOY on October 19, 2018. The track was written and produced by Finneas. The song was inspired by a brief encounter Finneas had with a girl while touring Japan to Osaka with his sister Billie Eilish. He told Billboard in February 2020: "I was FaceTiming a girl I'd never met every day and knowing there was nothing I could really do about it. I wrote this song about the day I would fantasize having with her." Finneas mentioned that it was about "a million degrees" in Japan and he would play the song's chords at the end of the day. The chorus would come first, then the first verse. The second verse was revealed by Finneas to have been created at a different date.

On August 7, 2020, Finneas released a different version of the track, title "Let's Fall in Love for the Night (1964)". Critical commentary said it was inspired by American singer Frank Sinatra, and similar artists who sang jazz during the 1940s and 1950s. Finneas explained in a statement when he originally produced the track, it took him down two different directions. One was inspired of the rhythms by Outkast, and the other was by the British virtual band Gorillaz. He goes on to say "Let's Fall in Love for the Night (1964)" was inspired by vinyls he listened to when he was younger. He wanted to make a lullaby version that sounded like it was from the 1940s. Ben Kaye of Consequence of Sound commented that the instrumentation features "childlike piano notes echoing alongside Finneas' smooth vocals", while Kate Brayden of Hot Press and Claire Shaffer of Rolling Stone mention Finneas sings over a "marimba and snap tracks".

== Composition ==
"Let's Fall in Love for the Night" has been described as a pop track in press reviews. The song reflects Finneas' love of romantic songs. It is about a girl he has never met in person and how he finds comfort by dreaming that they can be together in an alternate universe, but only temporarily. Finneas stated in an interview with Billboard that he loves pop tracks so much and doesn't put a ton of pressure on himself as an artist to always have to write "the most commercial feeling thing", and only wants to write songs that he would love to listen to. "Let's Fall in Love for the Night" starts with Finneas' "gentle whispered sweet nothings" vocals, then continues "into the heart of traditional song splendor". According to NME, Finneas' vocals within the song seem to be "flitting between falsetto flutters and something approaching a rap". Nicole Almeida of Atwood Magazine defined the track as an "acoustic-guitar led song", and compared it to "Start of Something New" from the High School Musical soundtrack.

== Reception ==
Callie Ahlgrim from Insider described the song as "irresistibly confident" and has a "cheerful ode to having a fling". American Songwriter's Paul Zollo praised the song, describing it as "championing aching melody and essential song craft", and called it "[r]omantic, sensual, tuneful, heartfelt, soulful and compellingly conversational". He concluded that it was "another perfect song for modern times". Will Richards, writing for NME, commended the singers vocals, saying it had "decent results on both ends". Starr Bowenbank, writing for Billboard magazine, commented that "Let's Fall in Love for the Night" is a "testament to [Finneas'] songwriting talent".

"Let's Fall in Love for the Night (1964)" also received mainly positive reviews from music critics. Shaffer viewed the song as an "original one-night-stand" and that it "strips it down to its bare essentials, turning it into modern lounge music", while Brayden also described it as a stripped-down track and takes "its bare essentials for a modern lounge atmosphere". Kaye commented that the song feels like "[Finneas] [is] rehearsing the song in a jazz club before the doors open and the smoke rushes in." Craig Sjodin writing for ABC News Radio depicted it gives "the tune more of an old-timey feel".

"Let's Fall in Love for the Night" debuted at number 34 on the US Billboard Alternative Songs chart during the week of February 15, 2020. It later rose to number 17 on the Alternative Songs chart during the week of April 17, 2020. The track also peaked at number 24 on the US Rock Airplay chart during the week of April 17. It has received a gold certification by the Recording Industry Association of America (RIAA) and Music Canada (MC). The song was nominated for Best Alternative at the 2020 MTV Video Music Awards.

== Promotion ==
The music video for "Let's Fall in Love for the Night" was released to Finneas' YouTube channel on March 19, 2020 and received its broadcast on MTV Live, MTVU, MTV International, and the Viacom Times Square Billboards. The music video was directed by Sam Bennett and choreographed by Monika Felice Smith. The visual was shot in one take. It begins with Finneas sitting on a perch playing the ukulele on the rooftop of a building to looking at the Los Angeles skyline. As Finneas continues singing, he is joined by a crew of dancers who perform choreography with him as he gracefully dances throughout the crowd. Finneas ends up sitting back on his perch, crooning the outro of the song as he looks at the camera and laughs. According to MTV, Finneas told them that the hardest part of filming the visual was the beginning scene, in which he sits on a little perch and strums his ukulele, then runs behind the camera to get to the other side of it, only to have to re-enter the frame looking like he did not even sweat slightly while sprinting.

The music video was positively received by critics. Madeline Roth writing for MTV described that the video for "Let's Fall in Love for the Night" is "finally here for [our] viewing pleasure". The staff of The Howard Stern Show commended the choreography, and described it as "slick". Ahlgrim dubbed the visual as a "carefully choreographed dance number", noting that it opens with Finneas floating around a rooftop at dusk, smiling at the camera and fidgeting with his suit jacket, and described him as "deeply charming".

Finneas toured throughout the United States during October 2019, in support of Blood Harmony. "Let's Fall in Love for the Night" was one of the tracks he performed from the EP during the tour. On February 3, 2020, he played the song on The Tonight Show Starring Jimmy Fallon and was joined by a live band. In April 2020, Finneas performed an acoustic version of "Let's Fall in Love for the Night" during a 50-minute livestream for Verizon Communications and One World: Together At Home, respectively.

== Charts ==
Chart performance for "Let's Fall in Love for the Night"
Chart (2020)	Peak position
US Alternative Airplay (Billboard)	17
US Rock & Alternative Airplay (Billboard)	24

== Certifications ==
Certifications and sales for "Let's Fall in Love for the Night"
Region	Certification	Certified units/sales
Australia (ARIA)	Gold	35,000^{‡}
Canada (Music Canada)	Platinum	80,000^{‡}
New Zealand (RMNZ)	Gold	15,000^{‡}
Spain (Promusicae)	Gold	30,000^{‡}
United Kingdom (BPI)	Silver	200,000^{‡}
United States (RIAA)	Gold	500,000^{‡}
^{‡} Sales+streaming figures based on certification alone.

== Release history ==
Release dates and formats for "Let's Fall in Love for the Night"
Region	Date	Format(s)	Version	Label	Ref.
Various	October 19, 2018	Digital download; streaming	Original	OYOY	
United States	February 11, 2020	Alternative radio	Original	OYOY	
Various	August 7, 2020	Digital download; streaming	1964	OYOY	
