= Optimist (album) =

Studio album by Finneas
- Released: October 15, 2021
- Genre: Alternative pop
- Length: 43:01
- Labels: OYOY; Interscope
- Producer: Finneas

Finneas chronology
Blood Harmony (2019)	Optimist (2021)	The Fallout (Original Motion Picture Soundtrack) (2022)

Singles from Optimist
- 1. "What They'll Say About Us" Released: September 2, 2020; 2. "A Concert Six Months from Now" Released: August 5, 2021; 3. "The 90s" Released: September 2, 2021; 4. "Love Is Pain" Released: October 14, 2021; 5. "Only a Lifetime" Released: December 15, 2021; 6. "The Kids Are All Dying" Released: January 12, 2022

Optimist is the debut studio album by American singer-songwriter Finneas, released on October 15, 2021, through his record label OYOY, distributed by Interscope Records. The album was entirely produced and written by Finneas. It was preceded by the singles "What They'll Say About Us", "A Concert Six Months from Now", and "The 90s".

== Critical reception ==
Professional ratings
Aggregate scores
Source	Rating
Metacritic	72/100
Review scores
Source	Rating
AllMusic	3.5/5 stars
Dork	4/5 stars
Gigwise	5/10 stars
The Guardian	2/5 stars
The Independent	4/5 stars
The Line of Best Fit	8/10
NME	4/5 stars
Pitchfork	5.6/10
Rolling Stone	3/5 stars
The Sydney Morning Herald	3/5 stars

On review aggregator Metacritic, Optimist received a score of 72 out of 100 based on ten critics' reviews, indicating "generally favorable" reception.

== Track listing ==
All tracks are written by Finneas, except where noted.

Optimist – Standard edition
No.	Title	Length
1.	"A Concert Six Months from Now"	3:25
2.	"The Kids Are All Dying"	2:47
3.	"Happy Now?"	2:52
4.	"Only a Lifetime"	4:16
5.	"The 90s"	3:23
6.	"Love Is Pain"	3:44
7.	"Peaches Etude"	2:15
8.	"Hurt Locker"	3:26
9.	"Medieval"	2:51
10.	"Someone Else's Star"	3:29
11.	"Around My Neck"	2:55
12.	"What They'll Say About Us"	3:01
13.	"How It Ends"	4:37
Total length:		43:01

Optimist – Deluxe edition
No.	Title	Writer(s)	Length
14.	"The Kids Are All Dying" (live from Abbey Road Studios)		2:55
15.	"Only a Lifetime" (live from Abbey Road Studios)		4:16
16.	"Love Is Pain" (live from Abbey Road Studios)		3:32
17.	"The Fool on the Hill" (live from Abbey Road Studios)	John Lennon, Paul McCartney	3:13
Total length:			57:04

== Personnel ==
Musicians

- Finneas – vocals, vocal arrangement, bass, drum programming, sound effects, synthesizer (1–6, 8–13); piano (all tracks), guitar (1–9, 12, 13)
- Isaiah Gage – cello (1)
- Johan Lenox – string arrangement (1)
- Yasmeen Al-Mazeedi – violin (1)

Technical

- Finneas – production
- Dave Kutch – mastering
- Rob Kinelski – mixing
- Justin Gammella – vocal editing (1–6, 8–10, 13)
- Casey Cuayo – mixing assistance
- Eli Heisler – mixing assistance

== Charts ==
Chart performance for Optimist
Chart (2021)	Peak position
Austrian Albums (Ö3 Austria)	59
Belgian Albums (Ultratop Flanders)	53
Belgian Albums (Ultratop Wallonia)	127
Dutch Albums (Album Top 100)	60
German Albums (Offizielle Top 100)	53
Swiss Albums (Schweizer Hitparade)	40
US Billboard 200	104
US Top Alternative Albums (Billboard)	9
