= What They'll Say About Us =

2020 single by Finneas

Single by Finneas

from the album Optimist
- Written: May - June 2020
- Released: September 2, 2020
- Recorded: 2020
- Length: 3:07
- Label: OYOY
- Songwriter: Finneas
- Producer: Finneas

Finneas singles chronology
"I Don't Miss You at All" (2019)	"What They'll Say About Us" (2020)	"Can't Wait to Be Dead" (2020)

"What They'll Say About Us" is a song by American singer-songwriter Finneas. It was released by OYOY as a single on September 2, 2020. The song was written and produced by Finneas. A lullaby-influenced ballad, the lyrics were inspired by the Black Lives Matter protests and Nick Cordero's death due to COVID-19. "What They'll Say About Us" was noted by music critics for its lyrical content. A music video for the song was released alongside the song and was directed by Sam Bennett in one take. It is the first single from his debut studio album Optimist.

== Background and development ==
Finneas wrote and produced "What They'll Say About Us". It was inspired by the spark of Black Lives Matter protests after racial inequality in the United States and the death of Canadian actor Nick Cordero, who died at the age of 41 from the ongoing COVID-19 pandemic. Finneas wrote the track in June 2020 while in quarantine. In an interview over Zoom with The Wall Street Journal, he said: "I wrote this song in June after spending the day at a protest in Downtown LA, filled with hope with the prospect that millions of people were coming together from all over the world to fight against institutionalized racism and inequality". He further stated: "The other component of the song was [that] I was very closely following Nick Cordero's story on Instagram, via his wife [Amanda Kloots], and Nick and his wife were not people I'd ever met. I don't know them at all. I saw the headlines about his health, just like everybody else did. I just became incredibly attached to this family that I’d never met before. I kind of wrote this song as if you were singing to your loved one who was in a hospital bed while the world was protesting outside. I did make a point to keep the song fairly ambiguous because I know everybody's sort of going through different circumstances of the same things right now".

== Composition and lyrics ==
"What They'll Say About Us" begins "calmly and reassuringly": "You're tired now, lie down/I'll be waiting to give you the good news/It might take patience/And when you wake up, it won't be over/So don't you give up". However, as the beat and other instruments begin to arrive, the soundstage changes to be hazy. John Pareles, writing for The New York Times, says "mortality begins to haunt the song, all the way to a devastating last line", noting the lyrics, "It might take patience/And if you don't wake up/I'll know you tried to/I wish you could see him/He looks just like you".

== Reception ==
In a review for DIY magazine, the staff labeled "What They'll Say About Us" as "poignant" and an "ode to human strength". Writing for Billboard magazine, Jason Lipshutz said while the production on the track is "effectively restrained", people should credit Finneas for going "full-on showstopper when he draws out the line, 'We've got the time to take the world / And make it better than it ever was'". Emily Tan of Spin magazine described the track as a song that "aims to offer comfort to those who have lost someone due to Covid-19".

== Music video ==
A music video for "What They'll Say About Us" was released to Finneas' YouTube channel on September 2, 2020. The video was directed by Sam Bennett and shot in one take. In the visual, lights and rain swirl around Finneas as he sings and offers comfort to people who have lost someone they love from COVID-19. Spin's Emily Yan described the visual as "simple" and "intimate".

== Charts ==
Chart position for "What They'll Say About Us"
Chart (2020)	Peak position
Mexico Ingles Airplay (Billboard)	15
US Hot Rock & Alternative Songs (Billboard)	35
