= Finneas O'Connell =

American musician and actor (born 1997)

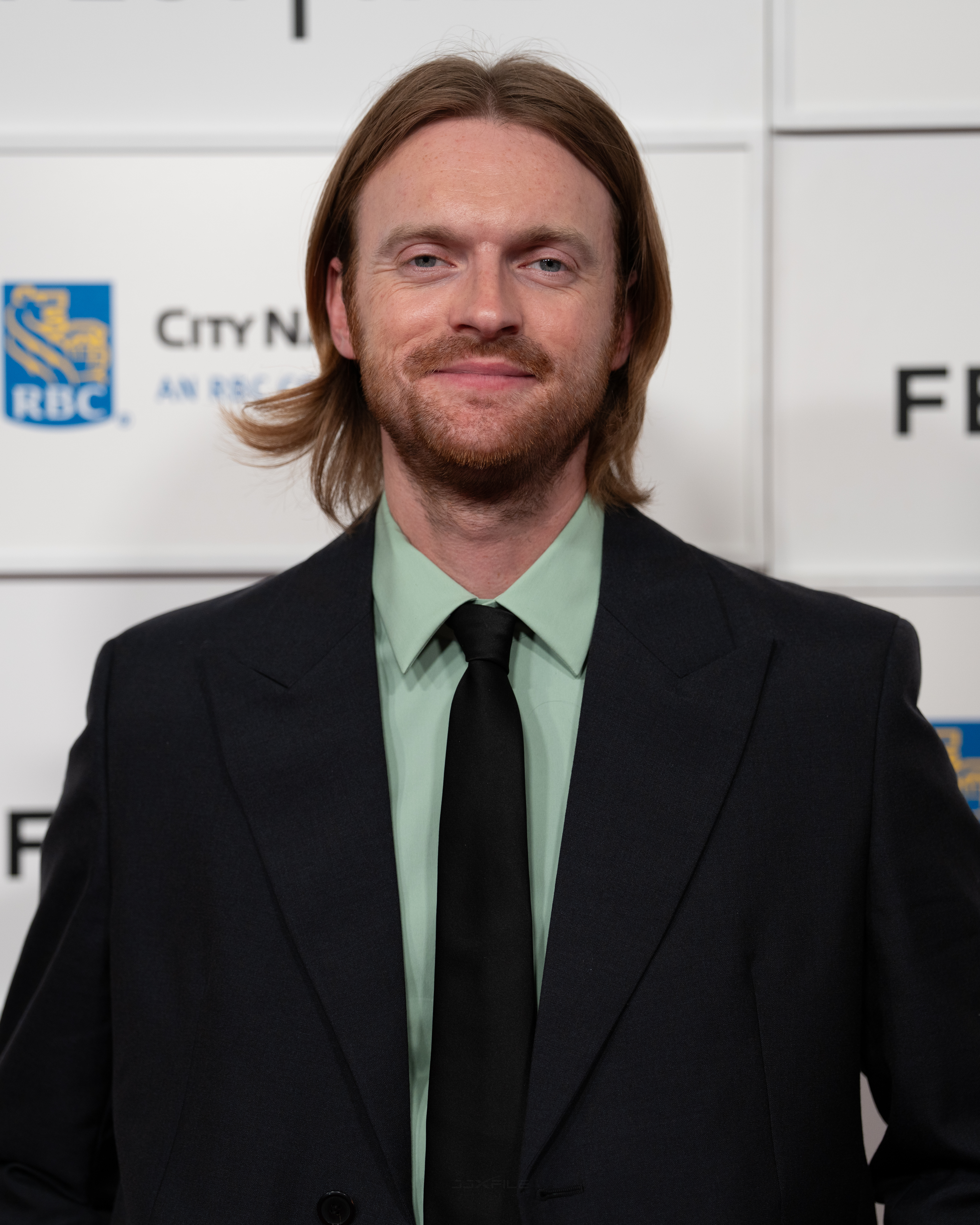
- Finneas O'Connell in 2026
- Born: Finneas Baird O'Connell; July 30, 1997 (age 29); Los Angeles, California, U.S.
- Occupations: Singer; songwriter; musician; record producer; actor
- Years active: 2011–present
- Works: Discography
- Spouse: Claudia Sulewski (m. 2026)
- Mother: Maggie Baird
- Relatives: Billie Eilish (sister); Brian Baird (uncle)
- Musical career
- Genre: Alternative pop
- Instruments: Vocals; guitar; bass; piano
- Labels: OYOY; Interscope; AWAL
- Member of: The Favors
- Website: finneasofficial.com

Finneas Baird O'Connell (born July 30, 1997), also known mononymously as Finneas (stylized in all caps), is an American singer, songwriter, musician, record producer, and actor. The recipient of numerous accolades including eleven Grammy Awards, two Academy Awards and two Golden Globes, he has written and produced music for various artists, including his sister, Billie Eilish, and he is credited on all of her projects.

For his work with Eilish, O'Connell has received 21 total Grammy Award nominations, including for the Big Four categories. He made history as the youngest act to win Producer of the Year, Non-Classical. He has won Record of the Year twice in a row, Album of the Year, Song of the Year thrice (tied with Eilish for the all-time record), Best Pop Vocal Album, and Best Engineered Album, Non-Classical as a producer on Eilish's albums and songs. He was also nominated for Best New Artist for his solo work. In 2022, their song "No Time to Die" from the film of the same name earned him the Academy Award and Golden Globe Award for Best Original Song and a Grammy Award for Best Song Written for Visual Media. In 2024, for "What Was I Made For?", they won the Grammy Award for Song of the Year, along with their second Academy Awards and Golden Globe Awards for Best Original Song. They became the youngest two-time Academy Award winners ever.

In addition to frequently working with Eilish, O'Connell has also worked with other high-profile artists, including Drake, Kid Cudi, Nicki Minaj, Selena Gomez, Camila Cabello, Demi Lovato, Halsey, Justin Bieber, Karol G, Girl in Red, Rosalía, Tove Lo, Ringo Starr, and Tate McRae, and contributed to several film scores. O'Connell has also released music as a solo artist, and his debut EP, Blood Harmony, was released in October 2019. The EP includes "Let's Fall in Love for the Night", his most successful song, peaking at number 17 on the US Billboard Alternative Songs chart. His debut studio album, Optimist, was released through Interscope Records in October 2021. He released his second album, For Cryin' Out Loud!, in 2024.

O'Connell starred in the 2013 independent film Life Inside Out. He is also known for his role as Alistair in the Fox musical comedy-drama series Glee. He has also made an appearance on the American sitcom Modern Family.

== Early life ==
Finneas Baird O'Connell was born on July 30, 1997, in Los Angeles, California, to actress and screenwriter Maggie Baird and actor Patrick O'Connell, both of whom are also musicians. O'Connell is of Irish and Scottish descent. In 2010, at age 12, he took a songwriting class with his mother and began writing and producing songs.

== Career ==
=== Songwriting and producing ===
O'Connell has said his experience playing characters helped with writing music for his younger sister, Billie Eilish, because he writes from her perspective and for her vocal range. He stated: "Being able to hear an artist and emulate them has been a huge part of being successful as a producer and co-writer". When he writes for his sister, he wants to "write a song that I think she'll relate to and enjoy singing and empathise with the lyrics and make her own", and when he writes with her he tries to "help her tell whatever story she's trying to tell, bounce ideas off of her, listen to her ideas."

Similarly to other artists, if you're writing and you know that someone else's voice is going to be the voice telling the story, it should be a language that fits them. ... Everybody has a different vocabulary, a different way of putting sentences together, and the easiest way to tell if a song wasn't written by someone is if it doesn't fit their vernacular, so I try to match whatever I'm helping them make to whoever they seem to be. A lot of that also ... is asking an artist how they feel about it. If you come up with a line, even if an artist really likes it and is like 'That's a really cool line,' it's like 'Yeah, but can you wear it? Is it a thing you'd feel comfortable with singing every time?'

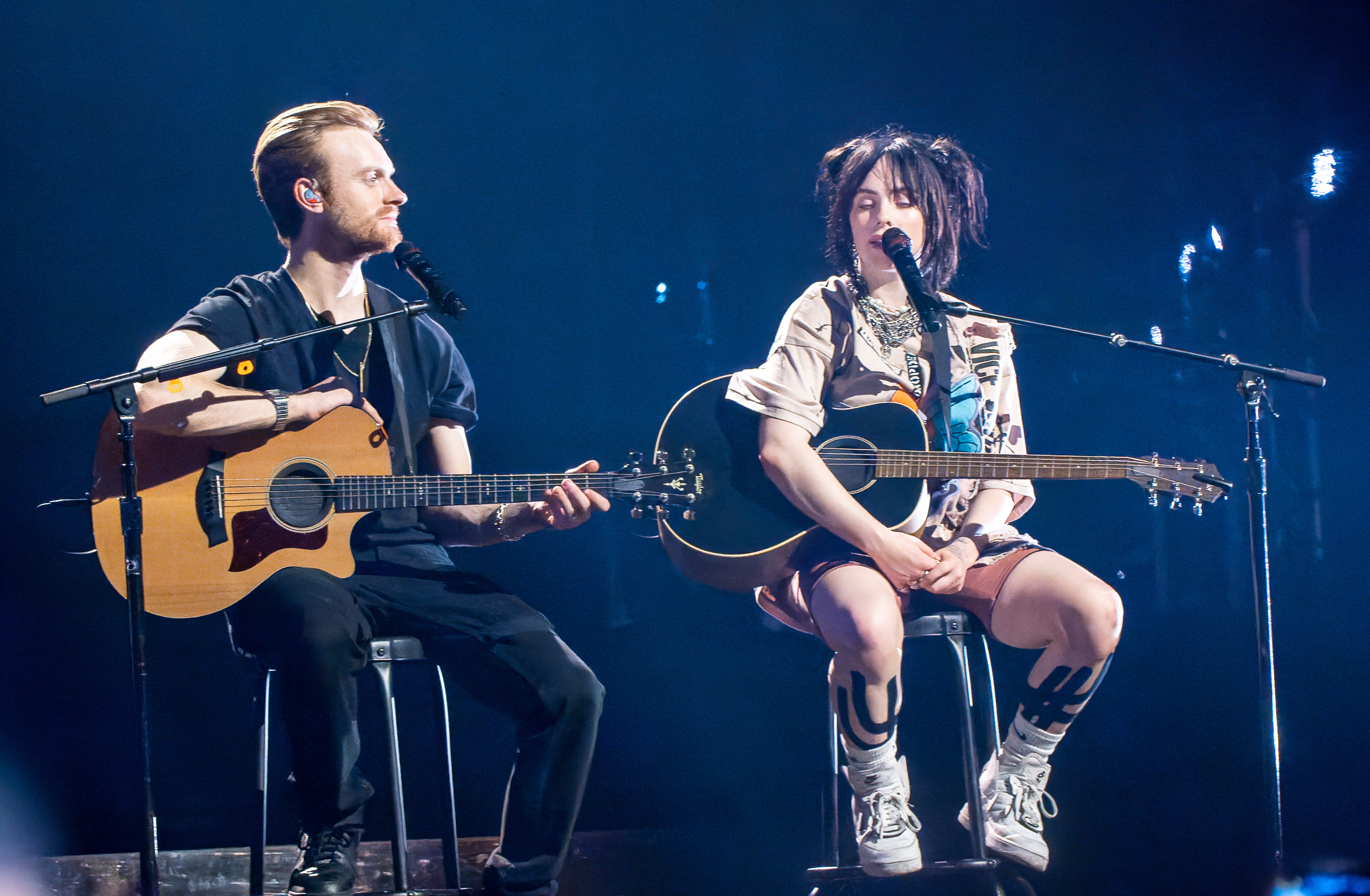
O'Connell performing with his sister, Billie Eilish, in 2022

O'Connell had written and produced the song "Ocean Eyes" originally for his band, but he gave it to Eilish when her dance teacher asked them to write a song for a choreography. They posted the song on SoundCloud, garnering praise from various websites. O'Connell's manager reached out to him in November 2015 to talk about Eilish's potential. O'Connell then helped Eilish sign to the A&R company Platoon. He co-wrote and produced Eilish's debut EP Don't Smile at Me (2017), which peaked at number 14 on the US Billboard 200. O'Connell also co-wrote and produced Eilish's debut studio album, When We All Fall Asleep, Where Do We Go? (2019), which debuted atop the US and UK charts. He won the 2020 Grammy Awards for Producer of the Year, Non-Classical; Record of the Year and Song of the Year for Eilish's "Bad Guy"; and Album of the Year and Best Engineered Album, Non-Classical for When We All Fall Asleep, Where Do We Go?. Eilish's subsequent albums Happier Than Ever (2021) and Hit Me Hard and Soft (2024) were also co-written and produced by O'Connell.

He has also been known to work with Grammy winners the Coutinho twins (Mason and Jules Coutinho). He produced the 2019 single "Lose You to Love Me" by Selena Gomez, which peaked at number one on the US Billboard Hot 100, and two tracks on the 2019 album Romance by Camila Cabello. He also produced "Moral of the Story" by Ashe, and collaborated with John Legend on an unreleased song. O'Connell composed the scores for the 2021 teen drama film The Fallout and the 2022 black comedy film Vengeance.

=== Solo music career ===
He is the lead singer and songwriter of the band the Slightlys, which played the Warped Tour in 2015. His first solo single, "New Girl", was released in 2016, with the music video released in 2019. In 2017, he released the single "I'm in Love Without You", and eight singles in 2018: "Break My Heart Again", "Heaven", "Life Moves On", "Landmine", "Hollywood Forever", "College", "Luck Pusher", and "Let's Fall in Love for the Night". In early 2019, O'Connell played his first sold-out headline shows in New York and Los Angeles.

His debut EP, Blood Harmony, was released on October 4, 2019. The EP's first single, "I Lost a Friend", was released on June 25, 2019, while the second single, "Shelter", was released on August 22, 2019, and the third single, "I Don't Miss You At All", on September 20, 2019. In October 2019, he embarked on his first headlining tour, in five cities in the US, in addition to a performance at Austin City Limits.

On August 7, 2020, he released a surprise deluxe version of Blood Harmony, featuring two new tracks, "Break My Heart Again" and "Let's Fall in Love for the Night (1964)", the latter being an alternate version of the sixth track, "Let's Fall in Love for the Night". About two weeks later, O'Connell released a single titled "What They'll Say About Us". It peaked at number 17 on the US Billboard Alternative Songs chart. On October 21, O'Connell released his single "Can't Wait to Be Dead" about his love-hate relationship with the Internet, along with a visual directed by Constellation Jones the following day.

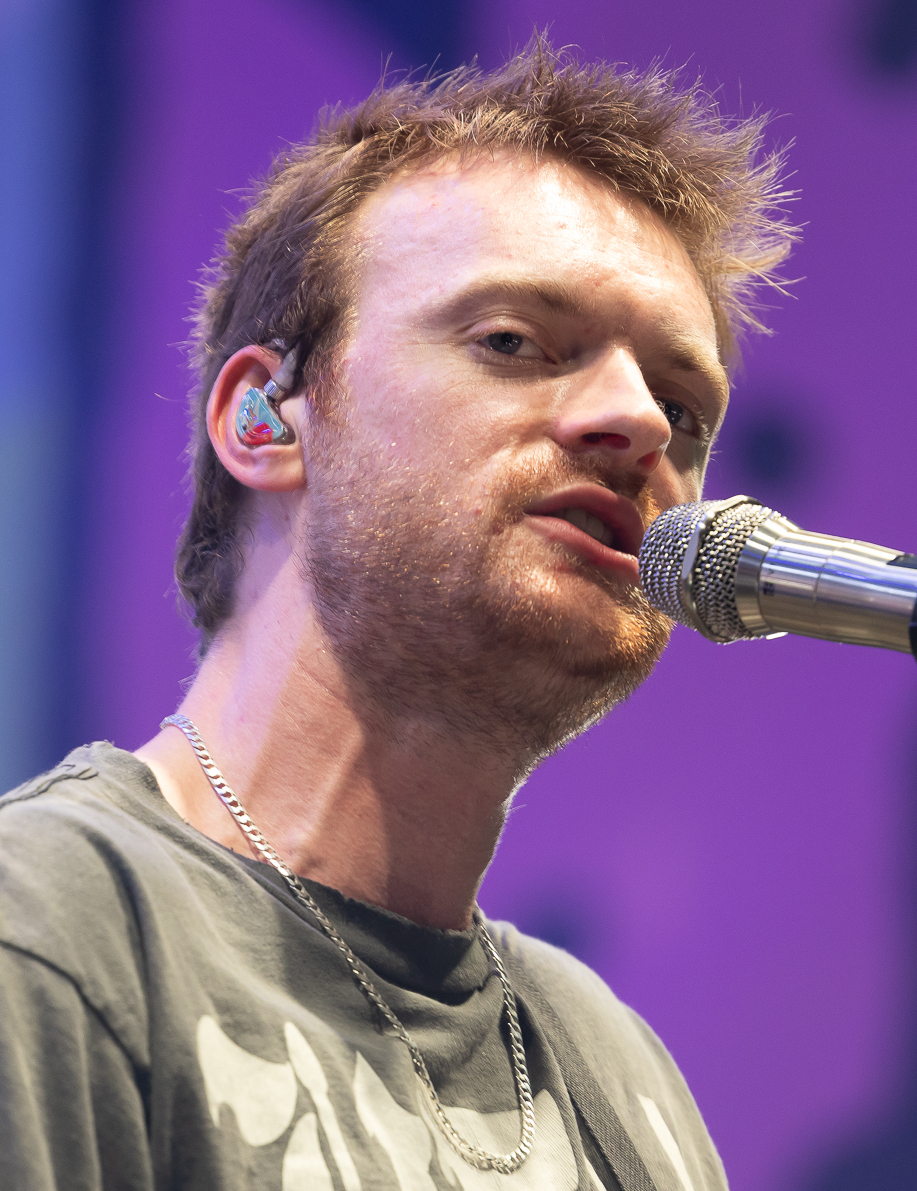
O'Connell performing in 2023

O'Connell is one of twelve artists featured on Ringo Starr's 2021 EP Zoom In, contributing backing vocals to the song "Here's to the Nights". On March 2, 2021, O'Connell and Ashe released a collaboration titled "Till Forever Falls Apart", which he co-wrote and produced. On August 5, 2021, O'Connell announced that his debut studio album Optimist would be released on October 15, 2021, through Interscope Records, and shared its lead single "A Concert Six Months from Now".

On August 8, 2024, O'Connell announced that his second studio album, For Cryin' Out Loud!, would be released on October 4, 2024. That day, he also released the title track as the lead single. On January 24, 2025, he made his Like a Version debut with a cover of the Zombies' "Time of the Season". O'Connell embarked on the United States leg of his 2025 tour in support of For Cryin' Out Loud! on February 13, with a performance in Nashville, Tennessee.

=== Acting ===
In 2011, O'Connell played a student in the comedy film Bad Teacher. In 2013, he co-starred in Life Inside Out, written by and starring his mother, Maggie, and directed by Jill D'Agnenica. He had recurring guest roles on Modern Family and Aquarius, and played Alistair in the final season of the musical comedy-drama television series Glee in 2015. In April 2026, O'Connell made an appearance as a fictionalized version of himself in an episode of Beef.

== Personal life ==
O'Connell lives in the Los Feliz neighborhood in Los Angeles. He was raised vegetarian before becoming vegan. O'Connell has been in a relationship with YouTuber and actress Claudia Sulewski since September 2018. His single "Claudia" was written after the night they met. On September 24, 2025, the couple announced their engagement on social media. They married on August 29, 2026.

Since the start of the Gaza war, O'Connell has been a vocal advocate for Palestinian human rights on and off social media. At the 96th Academy Awards in March 2024, he and Eilish wore Artists4Ceasefire pins on the red carpet; the campaign calls for permanent ceasefire in the Gaza war and the delivery of humanitarian aid to civilians. In September 2025, O'Connell appeared alongside Eilish in Together for Palestine video campaign, which urged an end to "the widespread violence and killing taking place in Gaza" and called on global leaders to intervene, with proceeds directed to Palestinian-led organizations providing relief on the ground. On September 15, 2026, amidst the Macklemore–Ed Sheeran tour controversy, he withdrew as an opening act for Ed Sheeran's Loop Tour after Macklemore was removed as an opening act for declaring "free Palestine". O'Connell said, "Artists must not be silenced when they speak up for the oppressed. I have decided to withdraw from my upcoming tour dates with Ed Sheeran. I stand with Palestine and its people."

O'Connell endorsed the Kamala Harris 2024 presidential campaign. On June 8, 2025, he was struck by tear gas while protesting against mass deportations by ICE.

== Discography ==
=== Studio albums ===
- Optimist (2021)
- For Cryin' Out Loud! (2024)

==== With the Favors ====
- The Dream (2025)

=== Extended plays ===
- Blood Harmony (2019)

== Tours ==
Headlining tours

- Optimist Tour (2021)
- For Cryin' Out Loud Tour (2025)

== Filmography ==
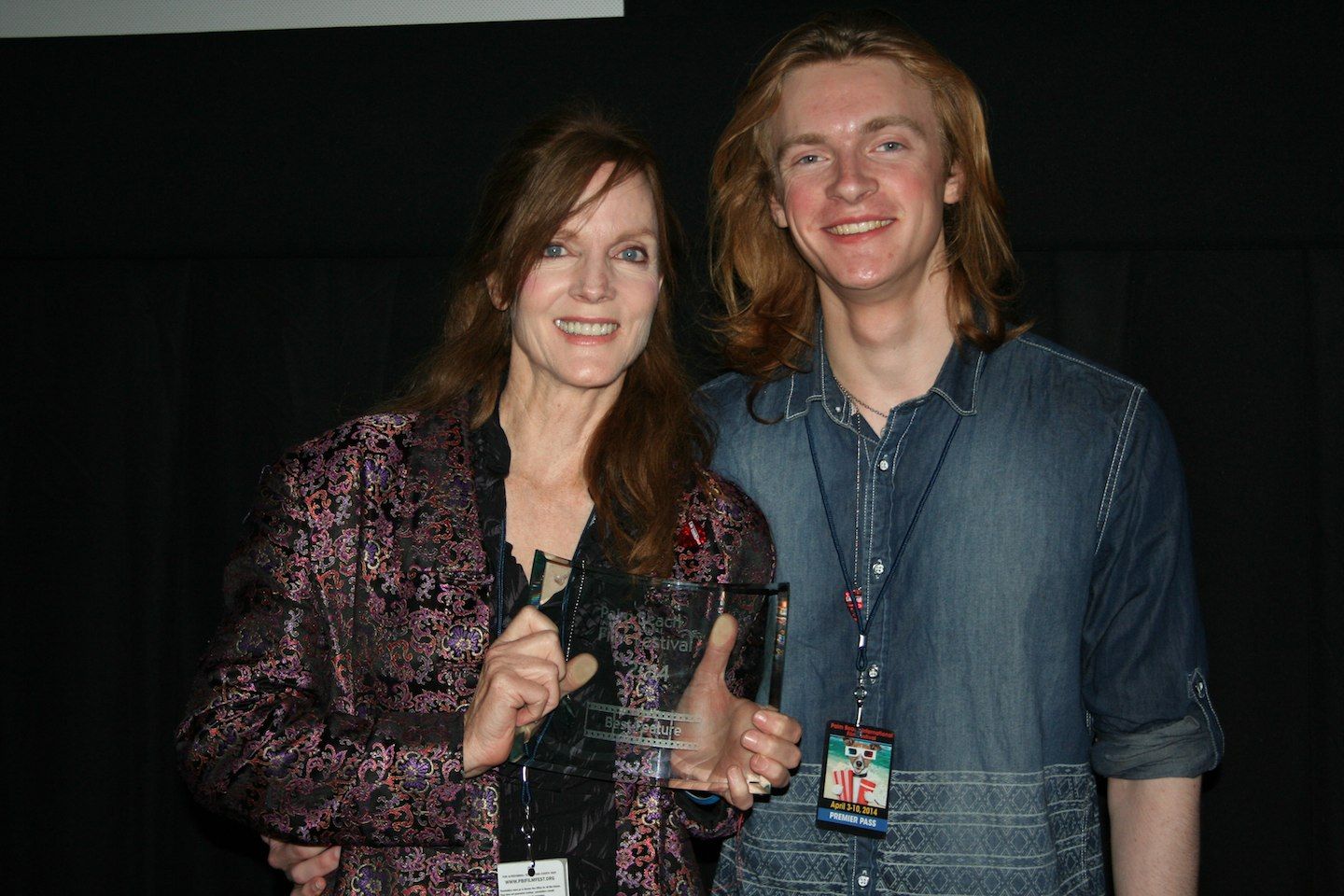
Finneas (right) with his mother Maggie Baird at the 2014 Palm Beach International Film Festival

Year	Title	Role	Notes
2011	Bad Teacher	Spencer	
2013	Life Inside Out	Shane	
2013	Tomorrow	Tom	Short
2013–2014	Modern Family	Singer/Ronnie Lafontaine Jr.	3 episodes
2014	happySADhappy	Andrew	Short
2015	Glee	Alistair	4 episodes
2015	Aquarius	Earnest Boy	2 episodes
2015	Fallout 4	Liam Binet (voice)	Video game
2018	Confessions of a Teenage Jesus Jerk	Tom	
2021	Billie Eilish: The World's a Little Blurry	Himself	Documentary
2021	Happier Than Ever: A Love Letter to Los Angeles	Himself	Concert film
2021	Saturday Night Live	Himself	Episode: "Billie Eilish"
2022	Turning Red	Jesse (voice)	
2022	When Billie Met Lisa	Himself (voice)	Short
2024	The Trainer	Himself	
2024	Laid	Jason	2 episodes
2026	Beef	Himself	Episode: "The Hour of Separation"; also composer

== Awards and nominations ==
Award	Year (Note: Indicates the year of ceremony. Each year is linked to the article about the awards held that year, wherever possible.)	Recipient(s) and nominee(s)	Category	Result	Ref.
Academy Awards	2022	"No Time to Die" (as songwriter)	Best Original Song	Won	
Academy Awards	2024	"What Was I Made For?" (as songwriter)	Best Original Song	Won	
ASCAP Pop Music Awards	2019	Himself and Billie Eilish	Vanguard Award	Won	
Apple Music Awards	2019	Himself and Billie Eilish	Songwriter of the Year	Won	
Berlin Music Video Awards	2026	The Favors – "The Little Mess You Made"	Best Song	Nominated	
Critics' Choice Movie Awards	2022	"No Time to Die" (as songwriter)	Best Song	Won	
Golden Globe Awards	2022	"No Time to Die" (as songwriter)	Best Original Song	Won	
Golden Globe Awards	2024	"What Was I Made For?" (as songwriter)	Best Original Song	Won	
Grammy Awards	2020	"Bad Guy" (as producer, engineer and songwriter)	Record of the Year	Won	
Grammy Awards	2020	"Bad Guy" (as producer, engineer and songwriter)	Song of the Year	Won	
Grammy Awards	2020	When We All Fall Asleep, Where Do We Go? (as producer, engineer and songwriter)	Album of the Year	Won	
Grammy Awards	2020	When We All Fall Asleep, Where Do We Go? (as producer, engineer and songwriter)	Best Pop Vocal Album	Won	
Grammy Awards	2020	When We All Fall Asleep, Where Do We Go? (as producer, engineer and songwriter)	Best Engineered Album, Non-Classical	Won	
Grammy Awards	2020	Himself	Producer of the Year, Non-Classical	Won	
Grammy Awards	2021	"Everything I Wanted" (as producer, engineer and songwriter)	Record of the Year	Won	
Grammy Awards	2021	"Everything I Wanted" (as producer, engineer and songwriter)	Song of the Year	Nominated	
Grammy Awards	2021	"No Time to Die" (as songwriter)	Best Song Written for Visual Media	Won	
Grammy Awards	2022	Himself	Best New Artist	Nominated	
Grammy Awards	2022	"Happier Than Ever" (as producer, engineer and songwriter)	Record of the Year	Nominated	
Grammy Awards	2022	"Happier Than Ever" (as producer, engineer and songwriter)	Song of the Year	Nominated	
Grammy Awards	2022	Happier Than Ever (as producer, engineer and songwriter)	Album of the Year	Nominated	
Grammy Awards	2022	Justice (as producer, engineer and songwriter)	Album of the Year	Nominated	
Grammy Awards	2023	"Nobody Like U" (as songwriter)	Best Song Written for Visual Media	Nominated	
Grammy Awards	2024	"What Was I Made For?" (as producer, engineer and songwriter)	Record of the Year	Nominated	
Grammy Awards	2024	"What Was I Made For?" (as producer, engineer and songwriter)	Song of the Year	Won	
Grammy Awards	2024	"What Was I Made For?" (as producer, engineer and songwriter)	Best Song Written for Visual Media	Won	
Grammy Awards	2025	Hit Me Hard and Soft (as producer, engineer and songwriter)	Album of The Year	Nominated	
Grammy Awards	2025	"Birds of a Feather" (as producer, engineer and songwriter)	Record of the Year	Nominated	
Grammy Awards	2025	"Birds of a Feather" (as producer, engineer and songwriter)	Song of the Year	Nominated	
Grammy Awards	2025	"L'Amour de Ma Vie" (Over Now extended edit) (as producer)	Best Dance Pop Recording	Nominated	
Grammy Awards	2026	"Wildflower" (as producer, engineer and songwriter)	Record of the Year	Nominated	
Grammy Awards	2026	"Wildflower" (as producer, engineer and songwriter)	Song of the Year	Won	
iHeartRadio Music Awards	2020	Himself	Producer of the Year	Won	
iHeartRadio Music Awards	2020	Himself	Songwriter of the Year	Nominated	
MTV Video Music Awards	2020	"Let's Fall in Love for the Night"	Best Alternative	Nominated	
Santa Barbara International Film Festival	2024	Barbie	Variety Artisans Award – Songwriter	Honored	
