= Break My Heart Again =

2018 single by Finneas

Single by Finneas
- Released: February 9, 2018
- Genre: Indie pop
- Length: 3:58
- Label: OYOY
- Songwriter(s): Finneas O'Connell
- Producer(s): Finneas

Finneas singles chronology
"I'm in Love Without You" (2017)	"Break My Heart Again" (2018)	"Heaven" (2018)

Music video
- "Break My Heart Again" on YouTube

"Break My Heart Again" is a song by American singer-songwriter Finneas. It was released by OYOY for digital download and streaming as a single on February 9, 2018. The song was later included on the deluxe edition of Finneas' debut EP, Blood Harmony (2019). An indie pop ballad, the song's lyrics address Finneas breaking up with his girlfriend through on and off texting. The song received mainly positive reviews from music critics, several of whom praised the music and lyrical content.

An accompanying one-take music video was released on April 18, 2019, and was directed by Sam Bennett. In it, the camera moves around Finneas as he sings about losing his loved one. The video received positive reviews from critics, many of whom praised its theme. Finneas performed "Break My Heart Again" as part of a 50-minute livestream for Verizon Communications in April 2020.

== Background and composition ==
"Break My Heart Again" was released as a standalone single for digital download and streaming through Finneas' record label OYOY on February 9, 2018. It was later featured on the deluxe edition of his debut EP Blood Harmony (2019), released on August 7, 2020. The track was written and produced by Finneas.

Critical commentary described "Break My Heart Again" as an indie pop ballad. Chris Riemenschneider, writing for the Star Tribune, compared the track to the works of John Legend, calling it a "John Legend-style romantic piano ballad". At the start of the song, a stripped back piano appears that accompanies Finneas' vocals. The sound of typing and sending messages is heard for the majority of the song: "Hey you/I'm just now leaving/Can I come around/Later on this evening?/Or do/You need time?/Yes of course/That's fine." The lyrics of "Break My Heart Again" are almost entirely composed of real texts between Finneas and a former lover. Finneas explained the texting in a statement: "The lyrics in the verses are basically verbatim text conversations I had with an ex-girlfriend. I thought it'd be cool to double illustrate that point so I added text and typing sounds to the production." As the chorus begins, Finneas switches from talking about his interactions with his loved one to admitting his strong emotions and Finneas' voice starts to become layered.

Finneas confesses to being constantly hurt by the one he cares about. He then admits it gets to a point where he's thinking his loved one is wrong for constantly hurting him. Finneas goes on to realize that he may be wrong for always allowing the former to hurt him, "So go ahead and break my heart again/Leave me wonderin' why the hell I ever let you in/Are you the definition of insanity?/Or am I? Oh, it must be nice/To love someone who lets you break them twice." The bridge suggests that the singer is confronting his lover about their issues. Finneas is pressured as he admits that he thought his lover was "the one", but their actions revealed that all they can do is break up and their relationship is over for good. Finneas then reveals they reunited five years later, and the song temporarily comes to a stop. The song starts over again, featuring piano and Finneas' vocals. He confesses that even though time has passed, his ex-lover is still the same. The chorus is then repeated, and stripped back heavier.

== Critical reception ==
"Break My Heart Again" was met with mainly positive reviews from music critics. Kasey Caminiti, writing for DuJour, labeled the song as "soft" and "relatable", while further mentioning that it "highlight[s] the insanity of millennial love stories". Tanis Smither of Earmilk described the song as "raw" and "startlingly honest". Music Connection's Dan Kimpel commended the lyrical content and melody of the song, which he viewed as "gorgeous". For Atwood Magazine, Nicole Almeida cited the track as a "soothing song for the brokenhearted" and stated that it is "proof of [Finneas'] supreme supreme talent". Shaad D'Souza of Paper magazine stated that "Break My Heart Again" is a "traditional-sounding ballad", and complimented the "masterful production work" while opining that the listeners should "stay for the twists".

== Music video and promotion ==
A music video for "Break My Heart Again" was uploaded to Finneas' YouTube channel on April 18, 2019. The video was directed by Sam Bennett and choreographed by Monika Felice Smith, while it was shot in one black and white take. In the visual, the camera revolves around Finneas as he sings, "So go ahead and break my heart again/Leave me wondering/why the hell I ever let you in/Are you the definition of insanity?/Or am I?/Oh, it must be nice/To love someone/Who lets you break them twice." The music video was positively received by critics upon its release. Smither described the visual as a "monochromatic canvas". Writing for Alternative Press, Alex Darus called the video a "heart-wrenching black and white video that really put us in our feels". In April 2020, Finneas "performed "Break My Heart Again" live during a 50-minute livestream for Verizon Communications.

== Certifications ==
Region	Certification	Certified units/sales
Canada (Music Canada)	Gold	40,000^{‡}
^{‡} Sales+streaming figures based on certification alone.
