= Straight-ahead jazz =

Genre of jazz

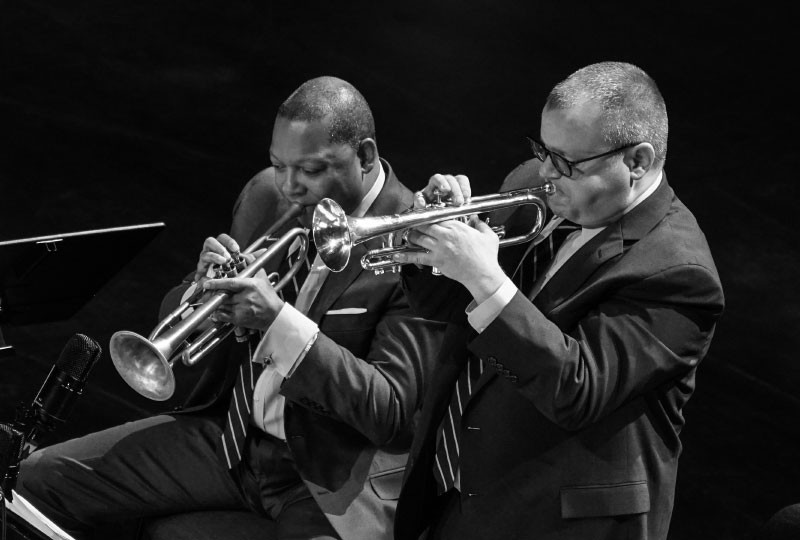
- Wynton Marsalis (left) and Ryan Kisor in 2020
- Stylistic origins: Swing music; bebop; hard bop
- Cultural origins: 1960s in the United States

Subgenres
- Neo-bop

Straight-ahead jazz is a genre of jazz that developed in the 1960s, with roots in the prior two decades. It omits the rock music and free jazz influences that began to appear in jazz during this period, instead preferring acoustic instruments, conventional piano comping, walking bass patterns, and swing- and bop-based drum rhythms.

== Musical style ==
A study conducted by Anthony Belfiglio at the University of Texas, Austin analyzed the music of Oscar Peterson, Wynton Kelly, Wynton Marsalis, and Marcus Roberts in order to determine key features of straight-ahead jazz that distinguish it from other genres. Belfiglio concluded that the walking bass, a 4/4 bass pattern in which a bassist plays one note to each beat, synchronized with a ride-based drum pattern was a defining component of straight-ahead jazz.

== Background ==
Often called "America's classical music", the subgenres of mainstream jazz have been less "subject to the whims of fashion", according to Scott DeVeaux, than other genres, with jazz reaching its modern form across "a long process of maturation". During the 1960s, however, two opposing subgenres emerged, the avant-garde and fusion, with neoclassicists emerging in the 1980s to oppose both of these factions. Free jazz largely questioned the traditional understanding of jazz harmony and played "outside" chord structures, and jazz, which had already become organic following the development of bebop, became increasingly chaotic as the former structures within bebop evolved into free improvisation and, according to some critics, "functional anarchy." Meanwhile, another strain of jazz musicians drew from pop and rock influences to develop jazz fusion and the first seeds of what later became smooth jazz. One of the founders of this camp was producer Creed Taylor, who turned obscure jazz musicians such as George Benson and Grover Washington Jr. into popular stars by incorporating pop music influences into jazz melodies and improvisation.

Purists of the era did not see the new jazz fusion subgenre as jazz due to its heavy pop music influences. Hence, the term "straight-ahead" jazz was formulated by critics and academics to describe music that did not employ fusion's innovations, such as rock beats and electric instruments. For example, Tanner, Gerow and Megill trace the straight-ahead aesthetic back to the hard bop era, after which some musicians would continue to be guided by jazz tradition when faced with boundary-pushing innovations.

Although bop "never died" during the 1970s, it had "a much lower profile" and "was overshadowed by other trends" as fusion's popularity skyrocketed. By the time Chuck Mangione joined the Jazz Messengers, there had taken place a "breakdown in the cultural consensus about the elements of authentic jazz." The few musicians who were determined to maintain the acoustic jazz tradition went to small independent labels like Concord and Chiaroscuro, with the latter label producing both swing music and bop, two genres once at odds with each other over bop's modernism.

The impact of the diverging styles was that, rather than "a succession of stylistic periods", jazz was now "an international language" and "it became difficult to describe the direction [of] jazz", making the primary branch of the genre difficult to identify.

== History ==
=== 1960s: Roots in bop ===
Critic Scott Yanow in his "Hard Bop" essay noted that the decade witnessed the evolution of soul jazz and the merging of modal jazz, soul jazz, hard bop, and avant-garde into the broader hard bop identity. However, as the decade progressed, experimentation with the mainstream notion of modern jazz became popular, first with the avant-garde styles developed by Ornette Coleman and Don Cherry, and later with experiments by leading mainstream musicians John Coltrane and Miles Davis. As rock gained popularity and swing maintained its audience, Coltrane's simultaneous death severely impacted innovation in the jazz world, with Coltrane's album releases maintaining utmost significance in the jazz world long after his death. In fact, in the mid- to late-20th century, there were so many young deaths among jazz musicians that a study conducted at the University Hospital of London, Ontario concluded that "jazz musicians ... have lost a combined 461 years of jazz productivity as a consequence of cirrhosis" alone. The shifts in the jazz world and the rise of free jazz correlated to the Black power and spiritual movements, along with the ideas of freedom of expression associated with the 1960s movement more broadly. But the new genre struggled to gain prevalence throughout the jazz genre, having been "ultimately ambushed by its naiveté."

=== 1970s: Jazz fusion era ===
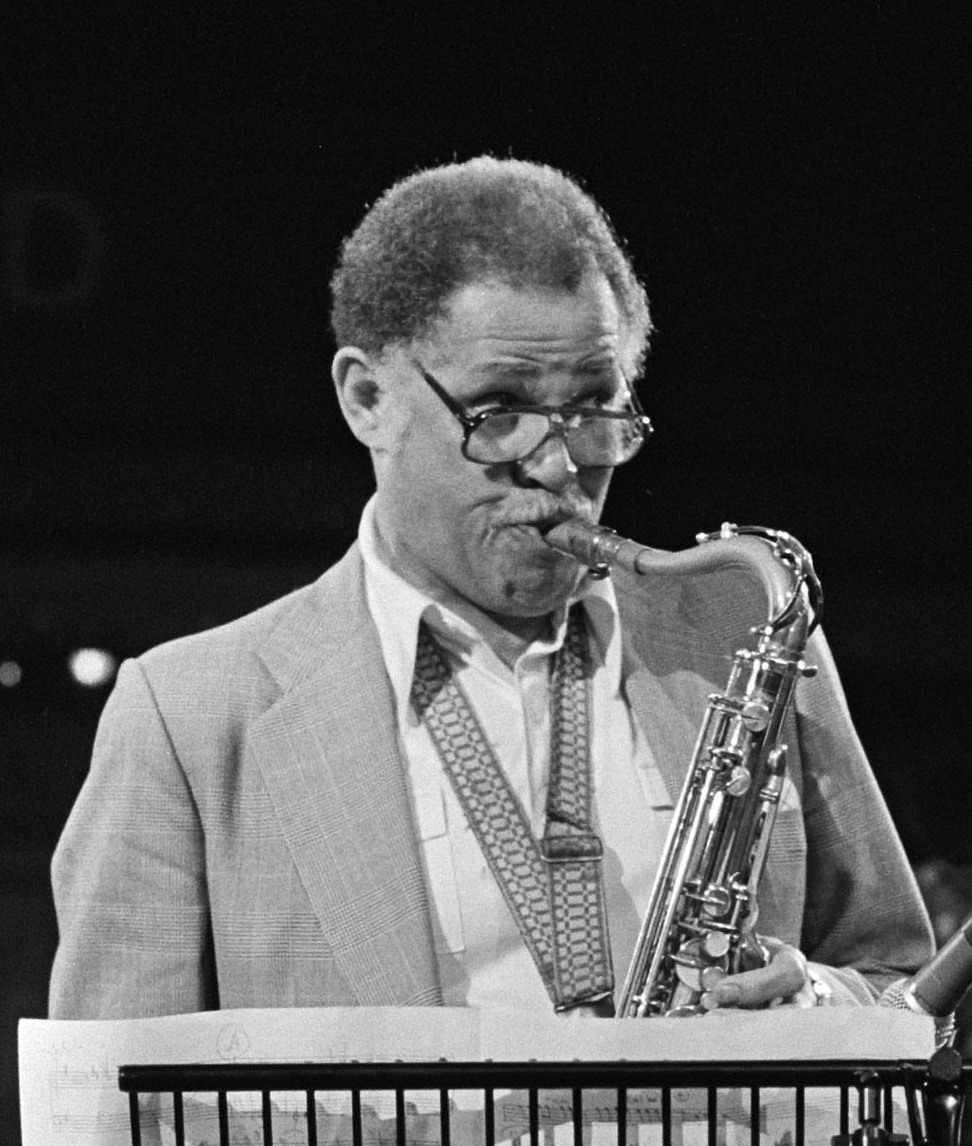
Dexter Gordon in 1980

Following the rise of jazz fusion, a number of hard bop or "straight-ahead" jazz musicians died or retired: Lee Morgan was shot and Kenny Dorham died in 1972, Hank Mobley retired due to lung disease following Breakthrough (1972), Cannonball Adderley died in 1975, and Charles Mingus died of ALS in 1979.

Jazz pianist McCoy Tyner was one of the few remaining jazz musicians to reject the electric style of jazz fusion, with the former young star at one point contemplating a part-time job as a taxi driver to make ends meet. His album Sahara (1972) received two Grammy nominations, reviving his career and critical acclaim and encouraging Blue Note to release his old material. In the mid-1970s fellow jazz pianist Cedar Walton founded Eastern Rebellion, an ensemble with the traditional saxophone/piano/bass/drums format, with primarily acoustic instrumentalists ranging from George Coleman to Curtis Fuller and Billy Higgins joining the band on rotation. In contrast to Walton's hard-bop style, introspective pianist Bill Evans maintained piano trios throughout the 1970s, and after some experimentation in the fusion and electric subgenres starting in 1969, Evans returned to the acoustic trio format with Marc Johnson and Joe La Barbera during the 1970s.

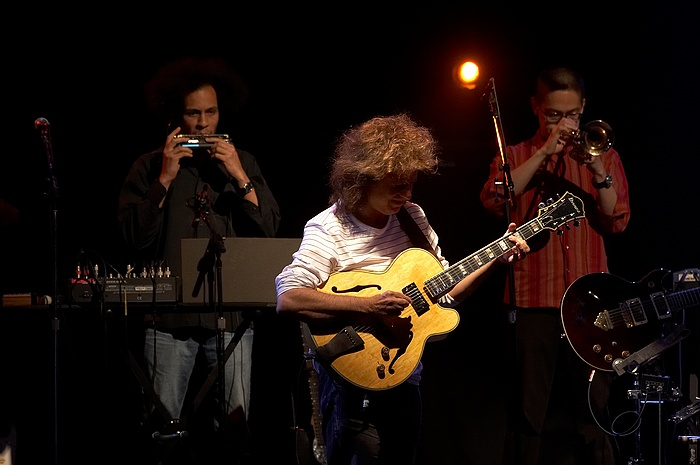
The mixed acoustic and electric influences of Pat Metheny

Many jazz musicians of the fusion era explored the pop-influenced trend while remaining attached to traditional roots. Members of the Charles Lloyd Quartet, including drummer Jack DeJohnette, believed in "the flame of creativity and exploration" in avant-garde and fusion experiments through the decade. Guitarist Pat Metheny's Bright Size Life (1976) with Jaco Pastorius is a further example of the blending of fusion with the music of a relatively straight-ahead musician. These explorations coincided with the rise of the ECM jazz label. With the rise of ECM and political tension in the United States, an increased number of jazz musicians moved from the U.S. to Europe, with Scandinavia and France moving the "centre of gravity" of jazz toward the continent. This shifted once again, however, in 1976, when Dexter Gordon, an important figure in bebop since the 1940s, returned to New York from Europe. His "homecoming" generated a great deal of enthusiasm, reviving interest in musical forms he and others had kept alive in Europe while they had fallen out of prominence in North America. Gordon released a series of live and studio recordings through the late 1970s and the Savoy and Blue Note labels re-released recordings from their Gordon catalogs.

Young straight-ahead tenor saxophonist Scott Hamilton recorded his first album in 1977, with the album's title, Scott Hamilton Is a Good Wind Who Is Blowing Us No Ill, coming from a Leonard Feather quote. Sidemen on the album included trumpeter Bill Berry, pianist Nat Pierce, bassist Monty Budwig, and drummer Jake Hanna. Scott Yanow noted that Hamilton's neo-straight-ahead effort predated the Young Lions Movement despite its similar musical approach.

=== 1980s: Revival ===
With the rising star of trumpeter Wynton Marsalis, Art Blakey's hard-bop style once again became a major force in the jazz world, and during the 1980s, this led to the popularization of straight-ahead jazz in jazz circles. Blakey released a number of albums, including Album of the Year (1981) and Blue Night (1985) with his Jazz Messengers band before he died in 1990. Jazz Messengers alumnus Woody Shaw, however, died at age 44 in 1989 following complications from a subway accident, following collaborations with a range of bop-oriented jazz musicians for over two decades. Before his death, Shaw had recorded albums such as Solid (1987) with progressive but bop-rooted saxophonist Kenny Garrett, pianist Kenny Barron, Shearing alumnus Neil Swainson on bass, and Victor Jones on drums. He would follow this album with Bemsha Swing (1997), recorded live on Detroit with pianist Geri Allen, bassist Robert Hurst, and drummer Roy Brooks; and a couple more albums prior to his death, with Yanow noting his high standard of playing despite declining eyesight and other health problems.

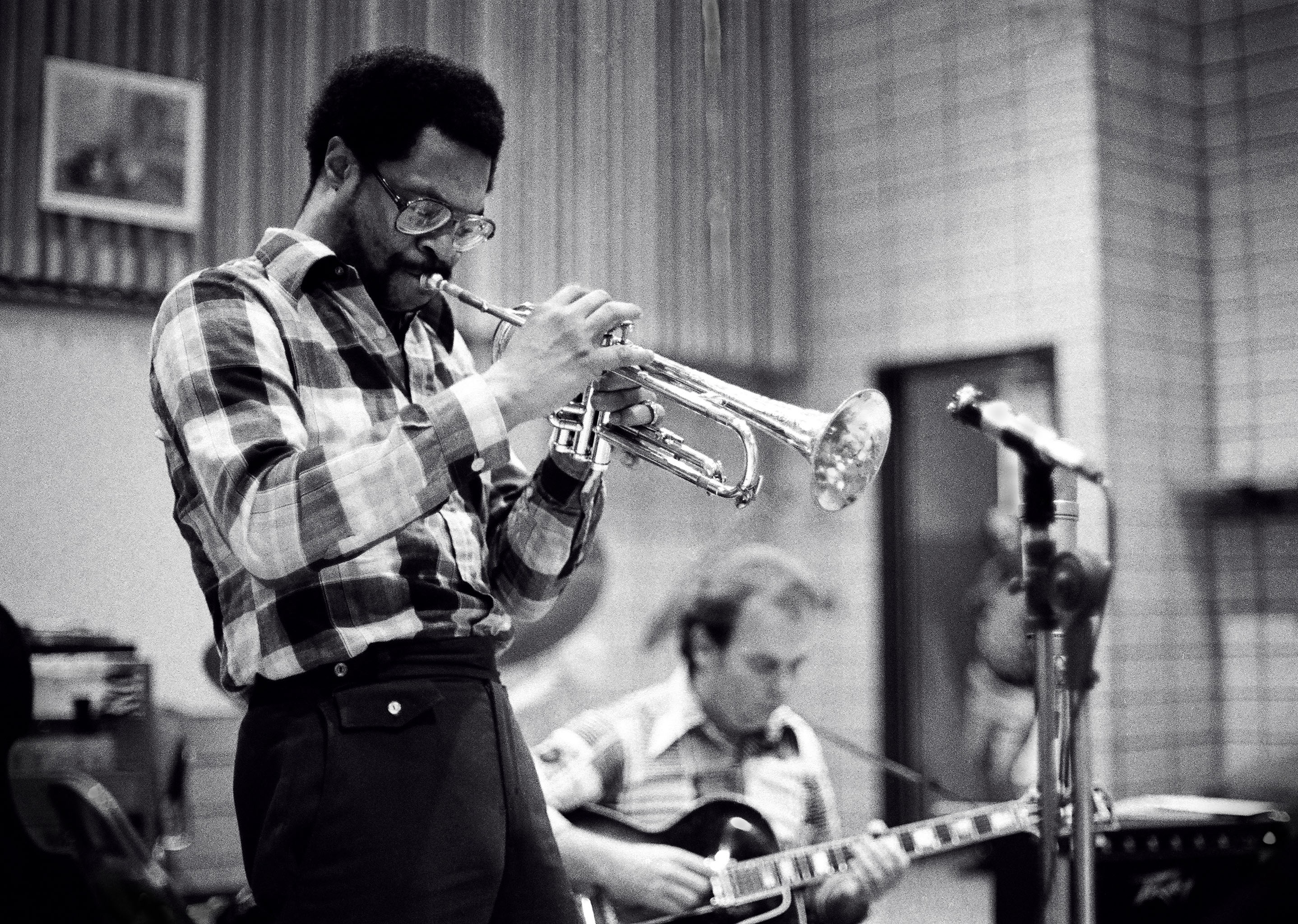
Woody Shaw in the late-1970s

In the mid-1980s, a film about jazz in the 1950s and 1960s, Round Midnight, was made based upon the life of Bud Powell, with the score being nominated the "Best Original Score" in 1986. It starred Dexter Gordon, who was nominated for "Best Actor," as an aging jazz musician.

In the mid-1980s, saxophonist Stan Getz led a quartet including pianist Kenny Barron, bassist George Mraz, and drummer Al Foster. In 1987, Getz was diagnosed with cancer, dying a few years later. Preceding his death he had continued to play with a number of albums, including Anniversary!, with these 1980s albums receiving critical acclaim. Fellow cool jazz musician, trumpeter Chet Baker, died in 1988 in the Netherlands, having made a successful comeback from a period out of jazz in the late 1960s. Baker's album My Favourite Songs, Vols. 1-2: The Last Great Concert (1988) was met with praise from critic Yanow, who noted his "inspired form" at the final recording before he landed, dead, outside a window in Amsterdam.

Trumpet and flugelhorn player Tom Harrell, after spending some years in the Horace Silver Quintet during the 1970s, became one of the prominent jazz trumpet players in the 1980s after recording a series of albums and collaborating extensively with alto saxophone player Phil Woods. Woods had formed his quintet/quartet following a brief foray into electronic jazz, and had expanded it to include Harrell, who was later followed by trombonist Hal Crook and trumpeter Brian Lynch.

==== Young Lions Movement ====
By 1980, Wynton Marsalis had become widely associated with the straight-ahead concept and was one of the pioneers of neo-bop jazz, a modern revival of straight ahead jazz, bebop, and hard bop. A member of Art Blakey's Jazz Messengers, trumpeter Marsalis appeared on the album Straight Ahead (1981) as a member of Blakey's then-11-piece band.

Following the rise of a number of young artists known as the "Young Lions," the neo-bop movement branched into its own subgenre based upon its "straightahead roots."

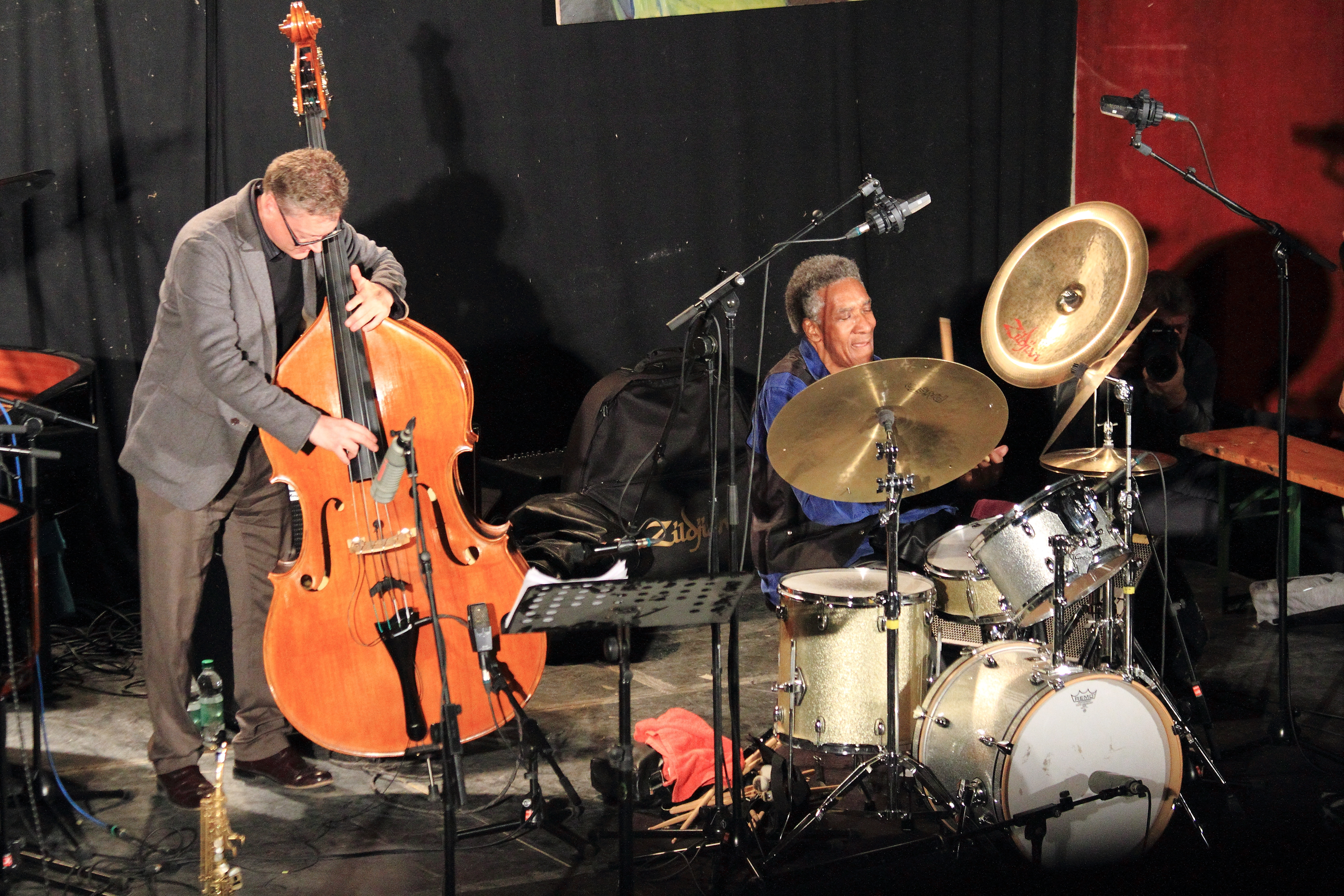
Al Foster Quartet in 2016

=== 1990s: Hard bop and neo-bop ===
With the new decade, the influence of the Jazz Messengers reverberated throughout the hard bop world, with "wholehearted hard-bop revivalist" Ralph Peterson, Jr., leading a quintet in the style of Art Blakey's band. In 1990, longtime bebop and hard bop alto saxophonist Jackie McLean returned to playing after years of teaching at University of Hartford Hartt School. Fifty-eight years old at the time, he noted, "I only have so many more years left" and vowed to "full-time commitment to the instrument," with his album The Jackie Mac Attack Live being released in 1991. His straight-ahead playing in his final years contrasted with his avant-garde experiments during the 1960s when he had surrounded himself with rising stars. Another bop veteran, Freddie Hubbard, who had switched to fusion in the 1970s before joining the post-bop VSOP Quintet in 1977, suffered a lip injury in 1992, severely impacting his career. He later joined Davis Weiss' New Jazz Composers Octet, switching to flugelhorn, an instrument that is easier on the lip than the trumpet. In 1992, bassist Dave Holland brought a pianist into his quintet, moving away from the pianoless avant-garde band model and toward hard bop. The new group was described by The New York Times as "constrained and methodical."

Arturo Sandoval, a Cuban-born trumpeter who could play in both Latin jazz and straight-ahead jazz settings, moved to Florida in the 1990s while on tour, enabling him to tour more freely and play with a wider range of musicians. He "attracted worldwide attention" when he emerged on the jazz scene, with his style being "blazing" and "technically flawless," according to critic Richard S. Ginell.

In 1995, Jim Merod interviewed saxophonist Scott Hamilton for the book Jazz as a Cultural Archive. Hamilton noted a wide range of influences, including pre-bebop and West Coast jazz musicians, while Merod remarked that Hamilton was among the "most contemporary links to the great heritage of the tenor saxophone...at the heart of...the jazz archive." Hamilton lived in the United Kingdom during the decade, although he continued to record albums as leader and sideman for Concord including AllMusic album picks Red Door: Remember Zoot Sims (1998) and Live at Birdland - 2 (1999).

There were a number of bop-oriented musicians who died in the 1990s, however, to offset the rise of new straight-ahead styles. These included saxophonist Stan Getz, trumpeter Miles Davis, saxophonist Dexter Gordon, trumpeter Dizzy Gillespie, and vocalist Sarah Vaughan. In addition, all four members of the Modern Jazz Quartet died in the 1990s or 2000s: Connie Kay in 1994, Milt Jackson in 1999, John Lewis in 2001, and Percy Heath in 2005. The quartet had taken influences from Third Stream and had been rooted in bop due to the backgrounds of Jackson and Lewis.

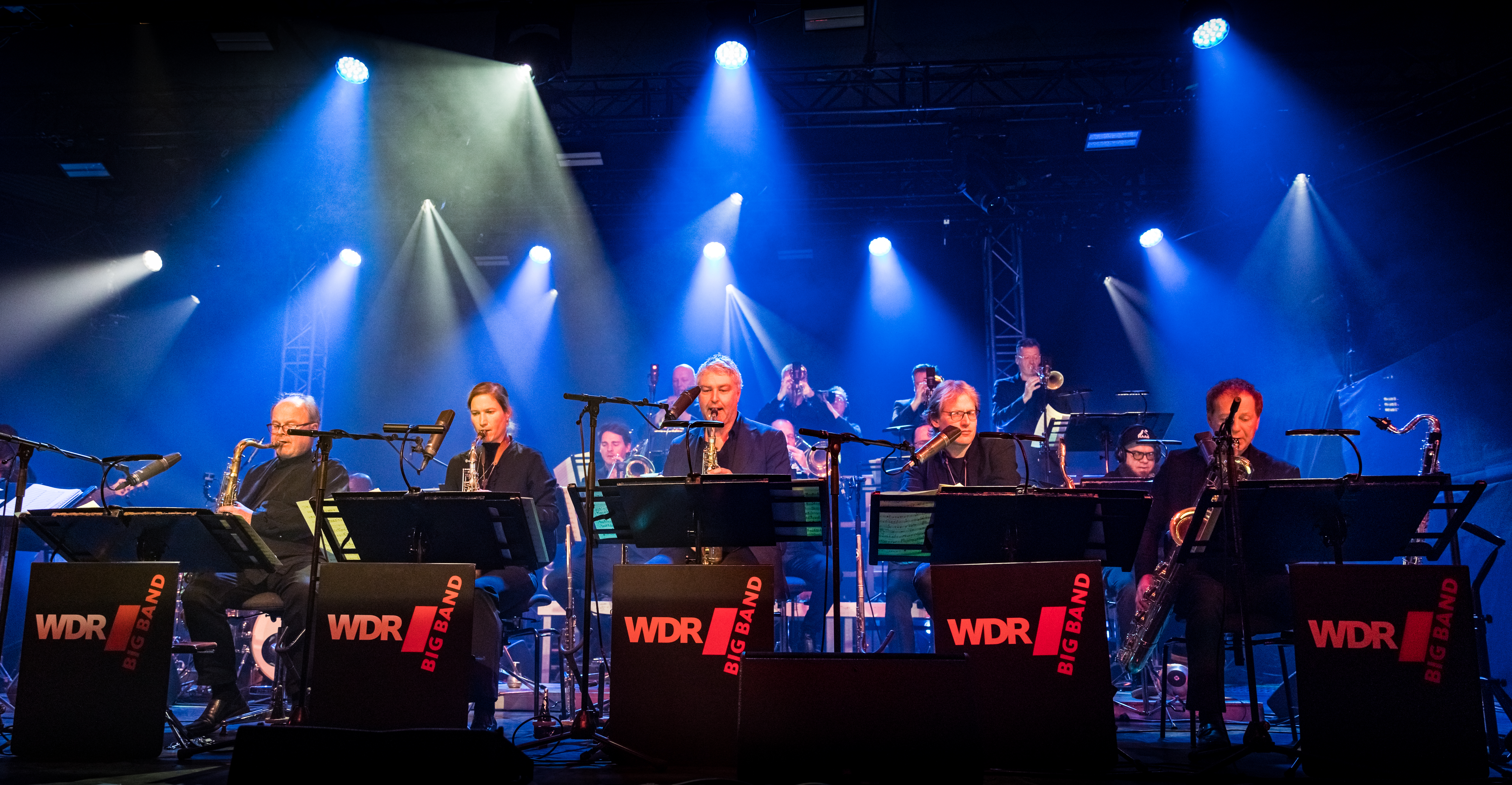
WDR Big Band in 2019

These deaths were succeeded by new names including saxophonist Eric Alexander, who burst onto the jazz scene in the early 1990s, having studied under jazz musicians such as pianist Harold Mabern, saxophonist Joe Lovano, and bassist Rufus Reid the previous decade. His debut as leader came with Straight Up for Delmark (1992), and by 1998 he had formed a quartet with pianist John Hicks, bassist George Mraz, and drummer Idris Muhammad to record the album Solid!

=== 2000s: Vocalists and popular influences ===
Young Canadian singer Michael Bublé, heavily influenced by Frank Sinatra and jazz singers, blended "old-school jazz standards and adult contemporary pop songs" for several hit albums, including his self-titled album (2003), It's Time (2005), and Call Me Irresponsible (2007). Critic Aaron Latham noted that "[u]nlike most young guys who gravitate towards the latest rock or rap trend, Michael Bublé chose to study the classic works of pop vocal masters like Ella Fitzgerald and Frank Sinatra while slowly developing his own technique and career as a vocal interpreter."

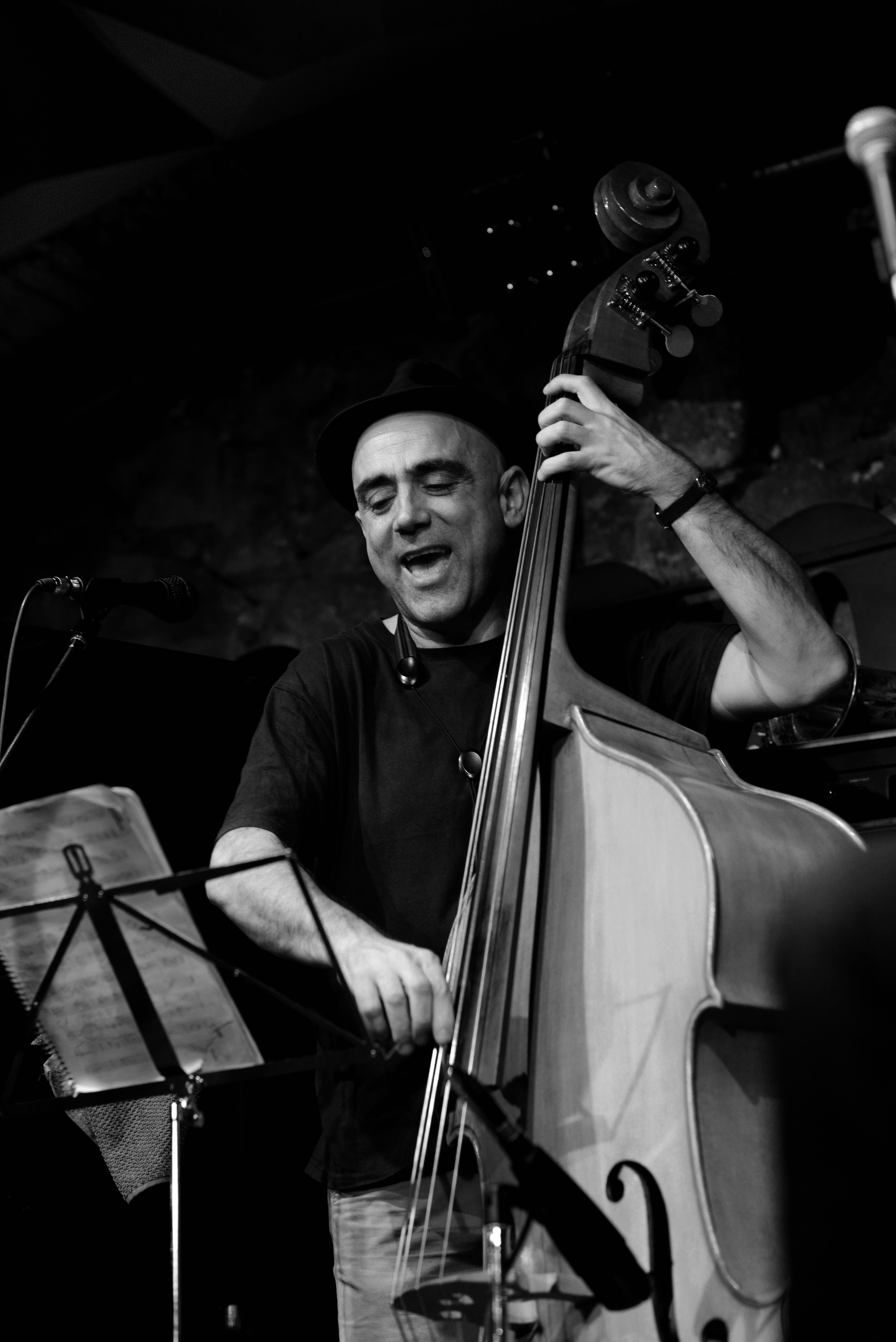
Joan Chamorro (bass)

With the rise of social media websites such as YouTube, jazz artists and bands were able to obtain popularity without conventional album releases, propelling their success. For example Barcelona-based multi-instrumentalist and teacher Joan Chamorro founded the Sant Andreu Jazz Band in 2006 and reached widespread audiences on the platform. The youth band has bred young multitalents including Andrea Motis (trumpet, saxes, vocals) and Rita Payés (trombone, guitar, vocals) while frequently featuring renowned musicians including pianist Ignasi Terraza and saxophonist Scott Hamilton.

Cologne-based WDR Big Band's 2005 album Some Skunk Funk with the Brecker brothers won at the 49th Grammy Awards of 2006, with the big band following this with tributes to veteran jazz musicians Django Reinhardt and Duke Ellington.

Eric Alexander continued to record, releasing three albums that received 4.5 stars from AllMusic: The Second Milestone (2001), It's All in the Game (2006), and Gentle Ballads, Vol. 3 (2008). On the second of these albums he recorded with Joe Farnsworth, who had developed a circle of straight-ahead jazz musicians including Marsalis, pianist Cedar Walton, and saxophonist Benny Golson. Farnsworth had previously used Augie's Jazz Club to play with bop musicians including Junior Cook, Harold Mabern, and Eddie Henderson before the venue was reformed under its current name, Smoke.

=== 2010s: Growth of online media ===
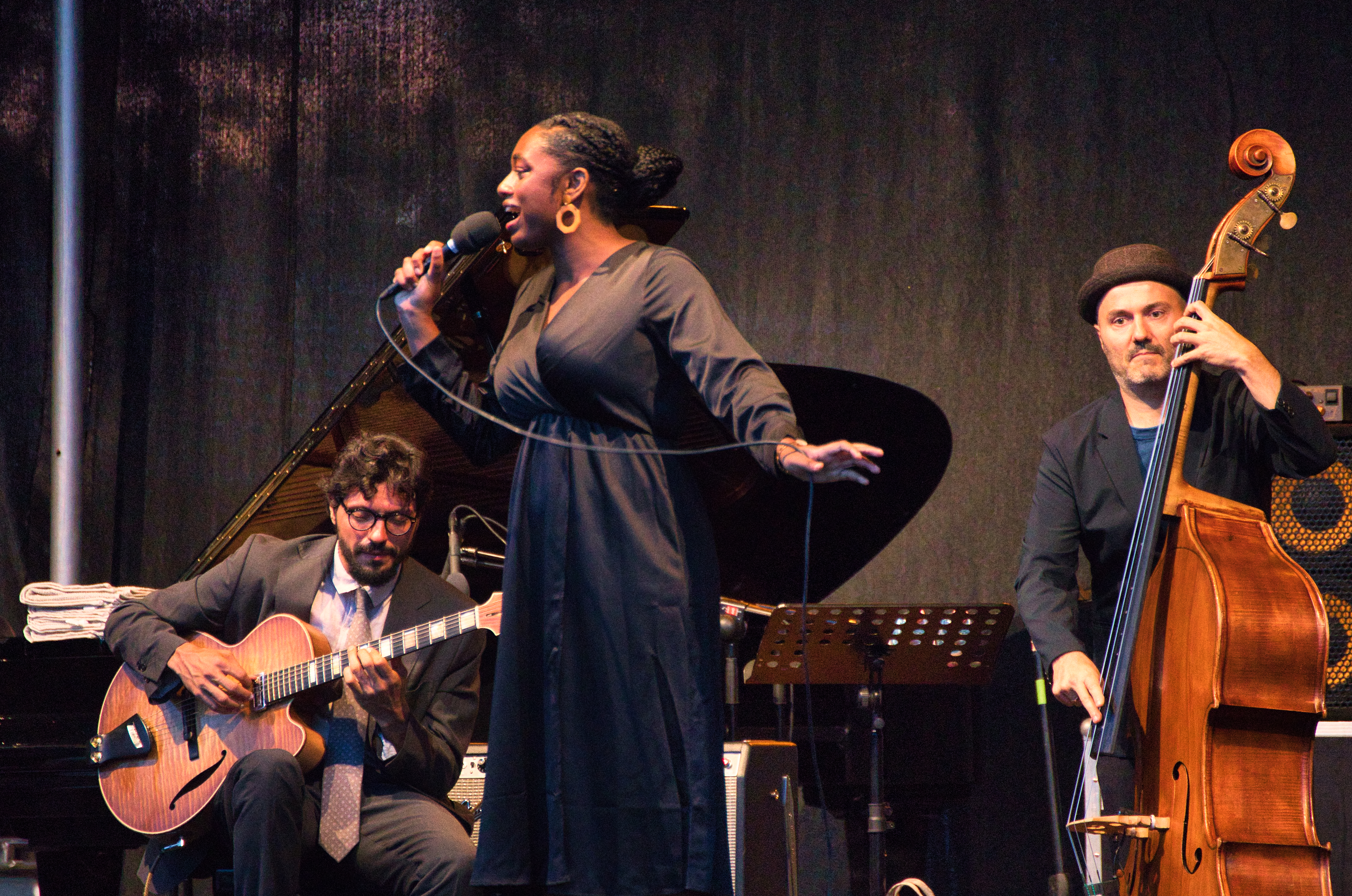
Pasquale Grasso (left) and Samara Joy (center)

In 2010, Joan Chamorro recorded Joan Chamorro Presenta Andrea Motis (2013) featuring pianist Terraza. He followed this with Feeling Good (2014), an album recorded with the Sant Andreu Jazz Band, including guitarist Josep Traver and drummer Esteve Pi. All About Jazz critic Bruce Lindsay described the musicians on the latter album as demonstrating "exceptional delicacy and taste." By late 2021, Chamorro had uploaded more than a thousand videos to the band's YouTube channel.

Young jazz pianist Emmet Cohen, taught by Brian Lynch, recorded with his former professor on Questioned Answer (2014); the album also included drummer Billy Hart and bassist Boris Kozlov on some tracks. Now-veteran jazz trumpeter Wynton Marsalis released an album recorded at Lincoln Center in 2018, Una Noche con Rubén Blades, that was included by Laura Fernandez as one of 2010's jazz albums of the decade, representing the blending of straight-ahead jazz with Latin-American influences. Trumpeter Bruce Harris, an Essentially Ellington alumnus, gained publicity in the 2010s with two Broadway show performances and his album Beginnings.

=== 2020s: COVID-19 and re-opening ===
In 2020, during the spring coronavirus lockdown, pianist Emmet Cohen, bassist Russell Hall, and drummer Kyle Poole started a YouTube channel for "Emmet's Place," a house concert venue run out of an apartment in Harlem. The channel gained millions of viewers, and he invited a wide range of guests to his apartment to sustain the channel and to showcase straight-ahead jazz. The Guardian described the style of music he performed as an "inclusive brand of jazz, incorporating the entire tradition of the genre from the 1920s to the present day" and noted the explosive growth of his almost entirely internet-based following. Meanwhile other artists, such as Pasquale Grasso, maintained more specific brands of straight-ahead jazz, with the guitarist recording a "digital showcase series" with albums including Solo Standards and Be-Bop! featuring vocalist Samara Joy, bassist Ari Roland, and drummer Keith Balla.
