= Sant Andreu (disambiguation) =

Sant Andreu, Catalan for Saint Andrew, may refer to:

== Places ==
- Sant Andreu, one of the ten districts of Barcelona
- Sant Andreu de Llavaneres, municipality in the comarca of Maresme
- Sant Andreu de Palomar, neighborhood in the Sant Andreu district of Barcelona
- Sant Andreu de la Barca, municipality in the comarca of the Baix Llobregat
- Sant Andreu Salou, village in the province of Girona

== Railway stations ==
- Sant Andreu (Barcelona Metro)
- Sant Andreu Arenal railway station
- Sant Andreu Comtal railway station

== Other uses ==
- Sant Andreu de Tresponts, Benedictine monastery in the Province of Lleida
- UE Sant Andreu, Spanish football team
- Sant Andreu Jazz Band
