= Lullaby of Birdland =

1952 jazz composition by George Shearing

Song
- Written: 1952
- Genre: Jazz
- Composer: George Shearing
- Lyricist: George David Weiss

"Lullaby of Birdland" is a jazz standard and popular song composed by George Shearing with lyrics by George David Weiss (under the pseudonym "B. Y. Forster").

== Background ==
George Shearing wrote "Lullaby of Birdland" in 1952 for Morris Levy, the owner of the New York jazz club Birdland. Levy had gotten in touch with Shearing and explained that he had started a regular Birdland-sponsored disk jockey show, and he wanted Shearing to record a theme which was "to be played every hour on the hour." Levy originally wanted his own music to be recorded, but Shearing insisted he could not relate very well with it and wanted to compose his own music. They compromised by sharing the rights of the song; the composer's rights went to Shearing, and the publishing rights went to Levy.

Shearing stated in his autobiography that he had composed "the whole thing [...] within ten minutes." The chord changes were partly from Walter Donaldson's "Love Me Or Leave Me".

Jean Constantin composed the lyrics to a French version, "Lola ou La légende du pays aux oiseaux".

== Musical characteristics ==
"Lullaby of Birdland" is in thirty-two bar form, and its original key was F minor (or A♭ major). The song spends an equal amount of time in both minor and major modes. It follows a I – vi – ii^{7} – V^{7} harmonic progression, and it has a I – vi^{ø}^{7} – ii^{ø}^{7} – V^{7} minor variation.

== Notable recordings ==
The original single was issued on MGM 11354 - "Lullaby Of Birdland" (Shearing) by The George Shearing Quintet, recorded July 17, 1952.

Lyrics were added later by George David Weiss; the recording by Sarah Vaughan with Clifford Brown became a hit in 1954.

The song has been recorded by many vocal and instrumental performers, including Ella Fitzgerald, the Blue Stars of France (a Billboard top twenty hit in 1956, sung in French), Lionel Hampton, Chris Connor, Mel Tormé, Eartha Kitt, Erroll Garner, Quincy Jones, Chaka Khan, Aoi Teshima, Mariah Carey, jazz bandleader Count Basie, Japanese R&B singer DOUBLE, Nikki Yanofsky, pianist Friedrich Gulda, The 12 Cellists of the Berlin Philharmonic, Korean singer Insooni, Finnish singer Olavi Virta (in Finnish), Vietnamese singer Tùng Dương, Spanish singer Andrea Motis (with a Bach-like three voice fugue based on the song theme by pianist Ignasi Terraza) and Italian singer Mina. A live version is included on the album Amy Winehouse at the BBC by Amy Winehouse. Winehouse also sampled the song in the track "October Song" from her debut album, Frank. In Stan Freberg's comic version of "The Great Pretender", the jazz pianist ad libs the first six notes of "Lullaby of Birdland", before the singer angrily shouts "WATCH IT!!" Other versions include Joni James, Wild Bill Davis, Anita Kerr Singers, Chet Atkins, Ralph Marterie, McGuire Sisters, Floyd Cramer, Frank Chacksfield, Hugo Montenegro, and Ray Conniff.

== See also ==
- List of post-1950 jazz standards
