= Ignasi Terraza =

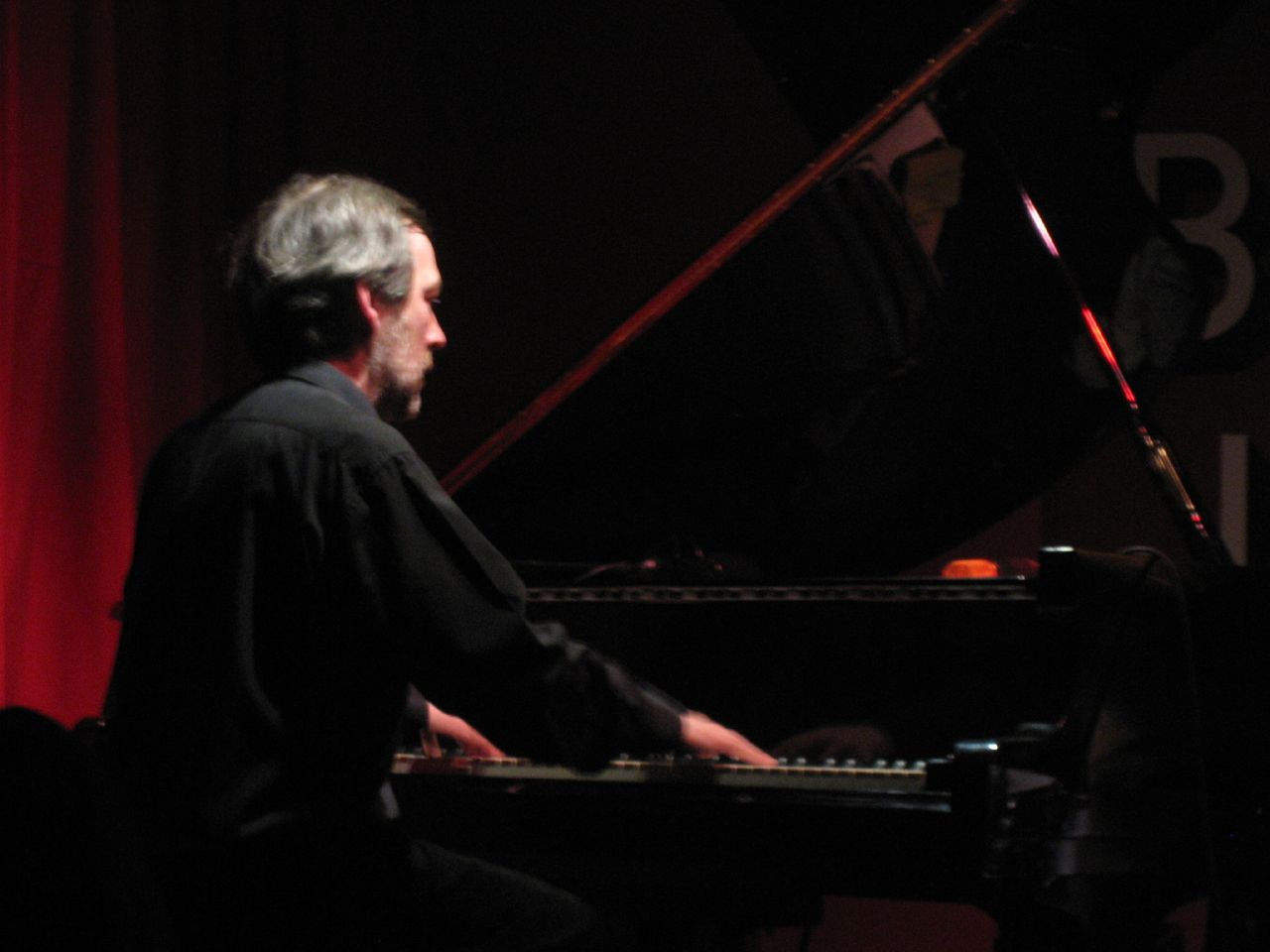
- Terraza in 2006

Background information
- Born: July 14, 1962 (age 63); Barcelona, Catalonia, Spain
- Genres: Straight-ahead jazz
- Occupation: Musician
- Instrument: Piano

Ignasi Terraza (born 14 July 1962) is a Spanish jazz pianist.

Blind from the age of 10, he studied piano as well as computer engineering and was the first blind person in Spain to obtain this degree. After three years dividing his time between his profession and music, in 1991 he decided to dedicate himself entirely to jazz, accompanying vocalists such as Kalil Wilson, Charmin Michelle, Randy Greer, Michelle McCain, Lavelle, and Stacey Kent, as well as jazz musicians Frank Wess, Jesse Davis, Gene "The Mighty Flea" Conners, Teddy Edwards, Ted Curson, Spike Robinson, Ralph Lalama, and Brad Leali.

As a leader, his trios and quartets have included bassists Pierre Boussaguet, Mario Rossy, Javier Colina, Jules Bekoko, and Horacio Fumero, and drummers Jean Pierre Derouard, Gregory Hutchinson, Walter Perkins, Bobby Durham, Peer Wyboris, Jo Krause, Esteve Pi, and Julian Vaughn.

One notable collaboration, divided into two periods (1985–1988 and 1996–2000), was with vibraphonist and drummer Oriol Bordas, performing in trio and quartet formations as well as with the Barcelona Jazz Orchestra.

Since 2003, he has taught jazz piano at the Escola Superior de Música de Catalunya – Catalonia College of Music. Since 2006, his trio has accompanied singer Susana Sheiman at venues in both Madrid and Barcelona.

In 2005, he founded his own label, Swit Records, with Miriam Guardiola. Dedicated entirely to jazz, the label combines record label operations with music promotion and management. Currently, the label boasts over thirty releases and a significant international presence.

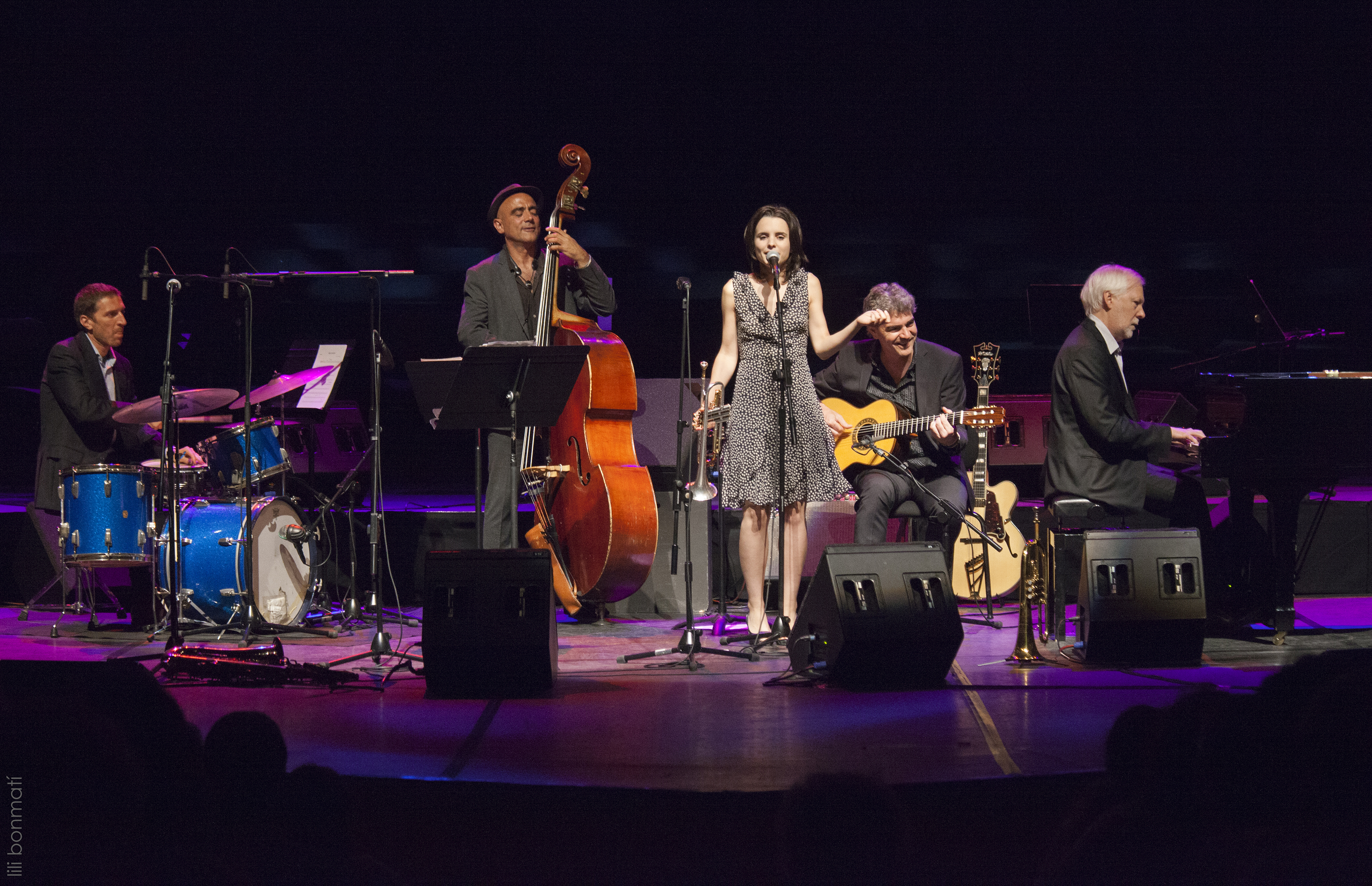
Andrea Motis & Joan Chamorro Quintet: Motis, Chamorro, Terraza, Traver, Pi (2018)

Since 2009, he has appeared in performances and recordings with the Sant Andreu Jazz Band, a youth big band founded by Joan Chamorro in Barcelona, featuring multi-instrumentalists such as Andrea Motis, Rita Payés, and others. He is also a member of the Motis Chamorro Quintet, which includes Josep Traver and Esteve Pi.

Terraza's 2009 recording, Plaça Vella (with the Josep Maria Farràs & Ignasi Terraza Trio), features two tracks with saxophonist Jesse Davis.

In 2013, he premiered his Suit Miró at Washington's National Gallery of Art during a monographic exhibition on the Catalan artist Joan Miró, and the following year performed the suite at Madrid's Museo Reina Sofía on International Museum Day.

Terraza has also composed music for theatre and television. Some examples are: the programme Una mà de contes, the film Ull per ull, the sound stories of COM Ràdio, and the musical El vestit de l'emperador, which was performed in the 2008 and 2009 seasons at the National Theatre of Catalonia and for which he was nominated for the Max Awards for best composer. On the other hand, in 2010, John Travolta's film From Paris with Love included a song from his album with saxophonist Toni Solà Night Sounds in the soundtrack.

He also participated as an actor in the film Centaurs de la nit, which was released in 2025.

== Awards ==
- 2024: AIE Award for Artistic Trajectory (Asociación de Intérpretes y Ejecutantes).
- 2024: Honorary Doctorate (Doctor Honoris Causa) from the Polytechnic University of Catalonia.
- 2017: Enderrock Award for Cultural Industries for the work of the Swit Records label.
- 2017: Honorary Academician by the Wine Academy of Vilafranca, in recognition of his connection to local jazz festivals.
- 2016: Award from the San Javier International Jazz Festival, for a lifelong career and contribution to the history of jazz.
- 2016: Award from the Jazzing Festival of Sant Andreu.
- 2011: Best Jazz Album by JAÇ/Enderrock magazine for Live at The Living Room – Bangkok.
- 2009: 1st Prize at the Jacksonville Jazz Piano Competition (USA).
- 2007: Best Jazz Album of the Year by JAÇ magazine for The Black Key.
- 2006: Best Jazz Album of the Year by JAÇ magazine for In a Sentimental Groove.
- 2006: Altaveu Award for In a Sentimental Groove, recognizing a fresh, Mediterranean identity in jazz.
- 2005: Best Performance at the Soto del Real Festival (Madrid).
- 1998: Career Achievement Award from the Complutense University of Madrid.
- 1996: Best Jazz Album of the Year by Ràdio 4 for Miaow!.
- 1991: 1st Prize at the Getxo International Festival for Best Group with the Mitchell-Terraza Quartet.

== Discography ==
In total he has released more than fifty albums in different formations.

- With Respect to Oscar (2025) - Ignasi Terraza, Ulf Wakenius & Pierre Boussaguet
- Tot celebrant Tete (2024) - Ignasi Terraza trio, Perico Sambeat, GJP bigband & Laura Simó
- Swinging with Boby Durham (2024) - Ignasi Terraza trio
- Porter & Gershwin on harmonica (March 2024 Vivo) - Antonio Serrano, Ignasi Terraza & Federico Lechner
- En la Orilla del Mundo (2023) - Pepa Niebla & Ignasi Terraza trio
- High on the Terraza II (2022)
- Unusual trio (2022) - Ignasi Terraza, Adrian Cunningham & Esteve Pi (Swit Records)
- Intimated Conversations with Andrea Motis, Scott Hamilton & Antonio Serrano (Swit Records, 2021)
- Jazz a les Fosques II (2021) - Ignasi Terraza Trio
- Around the Christmas Tree (Swit Records, 2020)
- Suit Miró (2013) - Ignasi Terraza Trio
- Swing Swing Swing! (2012)
- Swing Appeal (2011) - Susana Sheiman & Ignasi Terraza Trio
- Plaça Vella (2009) - Josep Maria Farràs & Ignasi Terraza Trio
- In a Sentimental Groove (2005) - Ignasi Terraza Trio
- Confessin’ (2004) - Oriol Romaní & Ignasi Terraza
- IT's Coming (2004)
- Christmas Swings in Barcelona (2003) - Randy Greer & Ignasi Terraza Trio
- Night Sounds (2000) - Toni Solá & Ignasi Terraza Trio
- September in the Rain (1999) - Barcelona Jazz Orchestra
- Jazz a les Fosques/Jazz en la oscuridad (1999) - Ignasi Terraza Trio
- Let Me Tell You Something (1999) - Ignasi Terraza Trio
- The Voice - The Romance of Jazz (1996) - Randy Greer
- Miaow! (1995) - Four Kats Jazz Quartet
- Shell Blues (1993) - Mitchell-Terraza Quartet
- Festival Internacional de Jazz de Getxo (1991) - Mitchell-Terraza Quartet

=== As a sideman ===
- Motis Chamorro Quintet: Live at Casa Fuster (Jazz to Jazz, 2014)
- Motis Chamorro Big Band: Live (Jazz to Jazz, 2015)
- Andrea Motis: Emotional Dance (Impulse!, 2017)
- Andrea Motis: Do Outro Lado Do Azul (Verve, 2019)
