= Rita Payés =

Spanish jazz musician (born 1999)

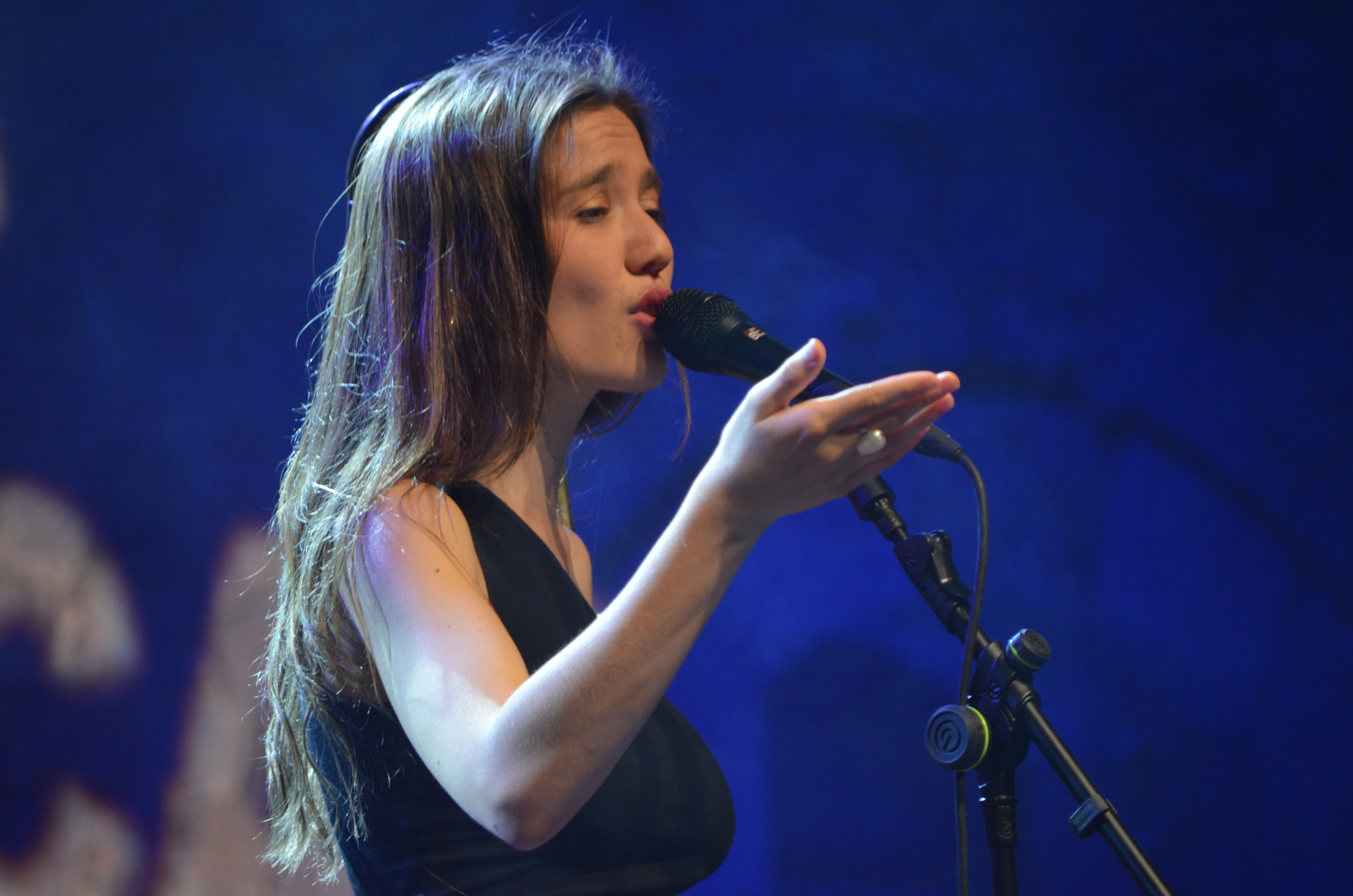
- Rita Payés in Cartagena (2022)

Background information
- Born: Rita Payés Roma; 26 September 1999 (age 27); Vilassar de Mar, Catalonia, Spain
- Genres: Jazz; bossa nova
- Occupation: Musician
- Instruments: Vocals; trombone; guitar; keyboard
- Years active: 2010s–present
- Education: Catalonia College of Music
- Website: ritapayes.com

Rita Payés Roma (born 26 September 1999) is a Spanish jazz and bossa nova trombonist, singer and songwriter.

== Early life ==
Payés was born in Vilassar de Mar to a musical family. Her mother, Elisabeth Roma, is a classical guitarist, and her father and brother are trumpeters. She graduated in jazz trombone from the Catalonia College of Music (Escola Superior de Música de Catalunya).

== Career ==
At the age of 13, Payés joined the Sant Andreu Jazz Band, directed by Joan Chamorro, where she began singing alongside Andrea Motis, Magalí Datzira, Alba Armengou and Eva Fernandez. At 15, she released her first album.

In September 2017, Payés, joined by the Motis Chamorro Quintet, performed at the 17th Tanjazz festival in Tangier, Morocco.

In 2019, Payés released Imagina, in collaboration with her mother. The two went on tour to promote the album in Europe. In alliance with Italian pianist Massimo Faraò, Payés in 2019 recorded two albums in New York: My Ideal, starring Scott Hamilton, and In New York.

On 16 April 2021, Payés released her album Como la piel in another cooperation with her mother, Roma, her partner, Pol Batlle, and with her brothers Eudald and Pere. The album made NPR Music's best Latin album in 2021. The track Nunca vas a comprender, an original composition, was an NPR Music's staff pick who described her voice as "angelic". Two months later, she was given the 2021 Alícia prize for emerging talent, awarded by the Acadèmia Catalana de la Música.

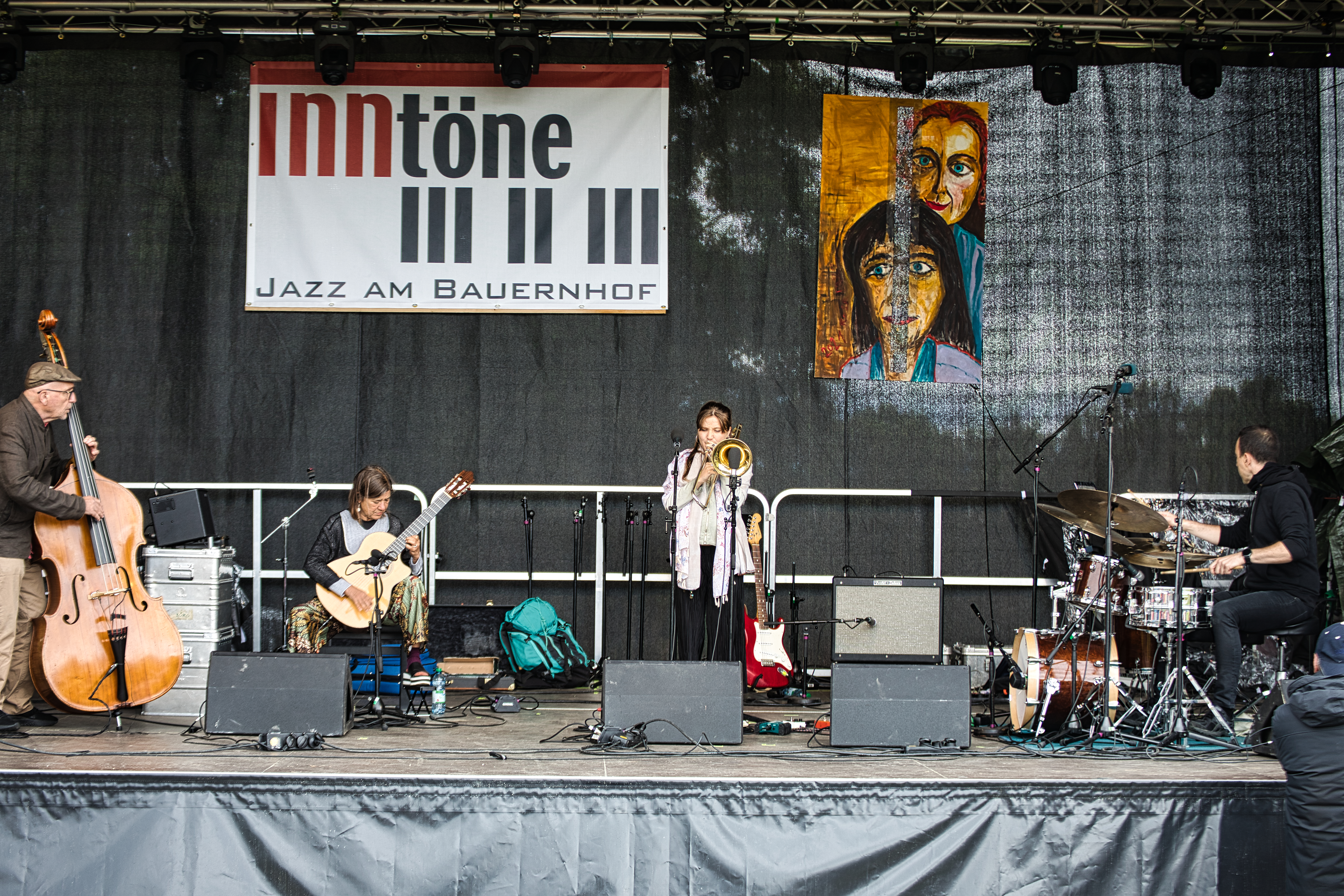
Payés with Elisabeth Roma, Horacio Fumero (left) and Nicolas Correa (right) at the INNtöne Jazzfestival, 2021

In June 2021, Payés and Roma presented their repertoire at Jazz Baltica in Timmendorfer Strand, Germany, in a concert which impressed critic Angela Ballhorn through their simple and touching play. During that summer, they also had a concert at the INNtöne Jazzfestival in the Innviertel, Austria, which was later aired by the Austrian radio station Ö1.

In July 2022, Payés and her band played at Jazzclub Trier. The newspaper Volksfreund, under the headline "Heartache Can Be So Fine", called her voice "fantastic", between ingratiation, aggression and infinite sadness. In August, Payés met WDR Big Band for two concerts titled The Spanish Trombone in Cologne. At ColorsxStudios in Berlin, Payés and Batlle recorded their new single "Vida" within the scope of A Colors Show. In November, 2022, Payés performed with her group in Studio Foce, Lugano, Switzerland, and had a concert at the 22nd festival Rigas Ritmi in Riga, Latvia, before which they played at the concert hall Ancienne Belgique in Brussels. In his concert report, Didier Deroissart described their repertoire as a mix of jazz, bossa nova and lounge music with some Americana.

At the 36th Goya Awards ceremony in Valencia 2022, Payés performed Te venero with C. Tangana in a live TV broadcast by Radiotelevisión Española. About her performance Madrid's El Independiente wrote that her deep voice outshone "the famous presence of C. Tangana". Her third studio album, De camino al camino, was released worldwide on 12 July 2024.

== Personal life ==
Payés's husband and frequent collaborator is the Spanish musician Pol Batlle, with whom she shares two daughters: in December 2021, Payés announced that she had given birth to a girl. Their second child, another girl, was born in May 2024. She lives in Northern Spain, outside of Barcelona.

== Discography ==
- Joan Chamorro presenta La Màgica de la Veu (Jazz to Jazz, 2014)
- Joan Chamorro presenta Rita Payés (Jazz to Jazz, 2015)
- Lua amarela (Jazz to Jazz, 2016)
- Imagina (2019) – with Elisabeth Roma
- My Ideal (Venus, 2019)
- In New York (Venus, 2019)
- Como la piel (2021) – with Elisabeth Roma
- De camino al camino (2024)
- Rueda Eterna (2026) – with Lucia Fumero

=== Collaborations ===
- 2021: La gent que estimo – with Oques Grasses
- 2024: Hache – with Raquel Lúa
