= Köln (Marshall Gilkes album) =

Studio album by Marshall Gilkes and the WDR Big Band
- Released: 2015
- Genre: Jazz
- Label: Alternate Side

Marshall Gilkes chronology
Sound Stories (2012)	Köln (2015)	Always Forward (2018)

The WDR Big Band chronology
Europhonia (2014)	Köln (2015)	My Personal Songbook (2015)

Köln is a 2015 jazz album by Marshall Gilkes and the WDR Big Band.

== Release and reception ==
Professional ratings
Review scores
Source	Rating
All About Jazz	4.5/5 stars
The Irish Times	4/5 stars
JazzTimes	(favorable)
UK Jazz News	(favorable)

The album earned Gilkes and the WDR Big Band a nomination for the Grammy Award for Best Large Jazz Ensemble Album.

== Track listing ==
All tracks are written by Marshall Gilkes.

No.	Title	Length
1.	"My Shining Hour" (By Harold Arlen and Johnny Mercer)	6:55
2.	"Vesper"	7:26
3.	"4711 Special"	7:57
4.	"Edenderry Intro"	4:13
5.	"Edenderry"	7:20
6.	"Plant Bassed"	7:25
7.	"Mary Louise"	9:50
8.	"End in Sight Intro"	1:19
9.	"End in Sight"	8:40
10.	"Downtime"	6:58
