= Frank Tate (musician) =

American jazz musician

Frank Eastman Tate (born July 18, 1943) is an American jazz double-bassist. He plays a five-string double-bass.

Tate was born in Washington, DC but raised in Arlington, Virginia, where he learned to play trumpet in his youth. He picked up bass when he was 23 years old, and from 1972 to 1975 was the house bassist at the Blues Alley club. He relocated to New York City in 1975, and in the later 1970s played with Bobby Hackett, Dave McKenna, Red Balaban, and Marian McPartland. He joined Zoot Sims's band in 1980 and worked with him until 1983. He led a band in Ireland at the Queen's University Festival in 1983 that featured Al Cohn, John Bunch, Billy Hart, and Spanky Davis; he played the festival again in 1985 with Scott Hamilton, Dave McKenna, and Davis once again. Later, in the 1980s, he played with Pearl Bailey, Ruby Braff, and the Alden-Barrett Quintet.
