= Marshall Gilkes =

American jazz trombonist and composer (born 1978)

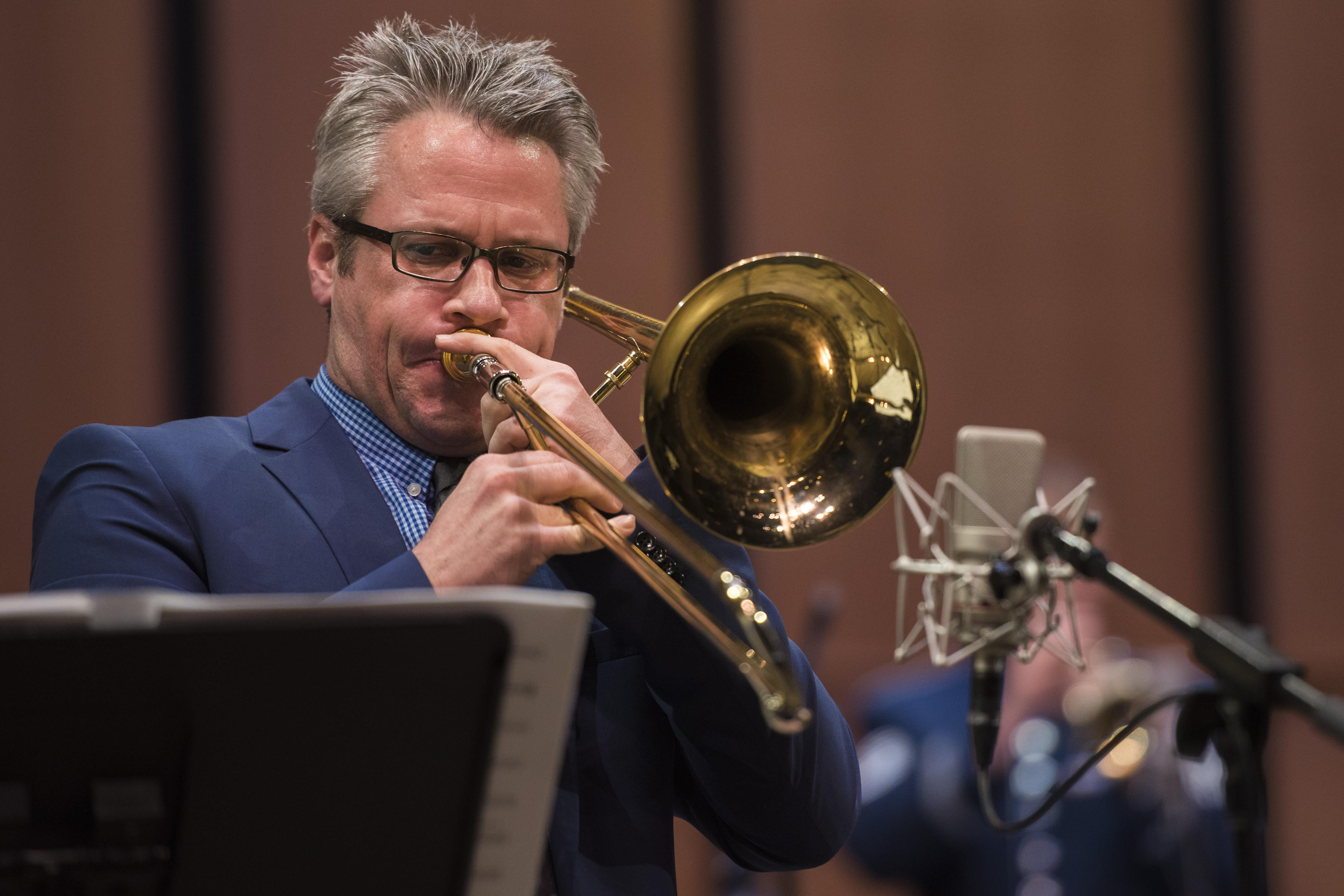
- Gilkes in 2017

Background information
- Born: Marshall Allan Gilkes; September 30, 1978 (age 47); Camp Springs, Maryland, U.S.
- Genres: Jazz
- Occupations: Musician; composer
- Instrument: Trombone
- Years active: 2004–present
- Label: Alternate Side
- Formerly of: WDR Big Band
- Education: University of Northern Colorado; William Paterson University; Juilliard School (BM)
- Website: www.marshallgilkes.com

Marshall Gilkes (born September 30, 1978) is an American jazz trombonist and composer.

== Early life ==
Marshall Gilkes was born in Camp Springs, Maryland, into a musical family; his mother was a classical vocalist and pianist, and his father was a euphonium player in the U.S. Air Force Band in Washington, D.C., and, later, conductor of several Air Force bands including the premier U.S. Air Force Academy Band in Colorado Springs. Due to his father's military profession, he had an itinerant upbringing in Washington, D.C., New Hampshire, New Jersey, Alabama, Illinois, and Colorado.

Gilkes, c. 2008

He received his early musical training at the Interlochen Arts Academy, the University of Northern Colorado, and William Paterson University. He holds a Bachelor of Music degree from the Juilliard School. His teachers included Joseph Alessi, Conrad Herwig, CMSgt (ret) Mark Burditt, Buddy Baker, Ed Neumeister, and Wycliffe Gordon.

In 2003, Gilkes was a finalist in the Thelonious Monk International Jazz Competition (later renamed the Herbie Hancock Institute of Jazz International Competition).

== Career ==
Beginning in 2004, Gilkes has released eight albums exploring a variety of ensemble settings, including trio, quartet, quintet, brass octet, jazz combo, and big band formats. He is recognized for his distinctive timbre, sound quality, and technical proficiency, which have contributed to his reputation as a highly regarded musician.

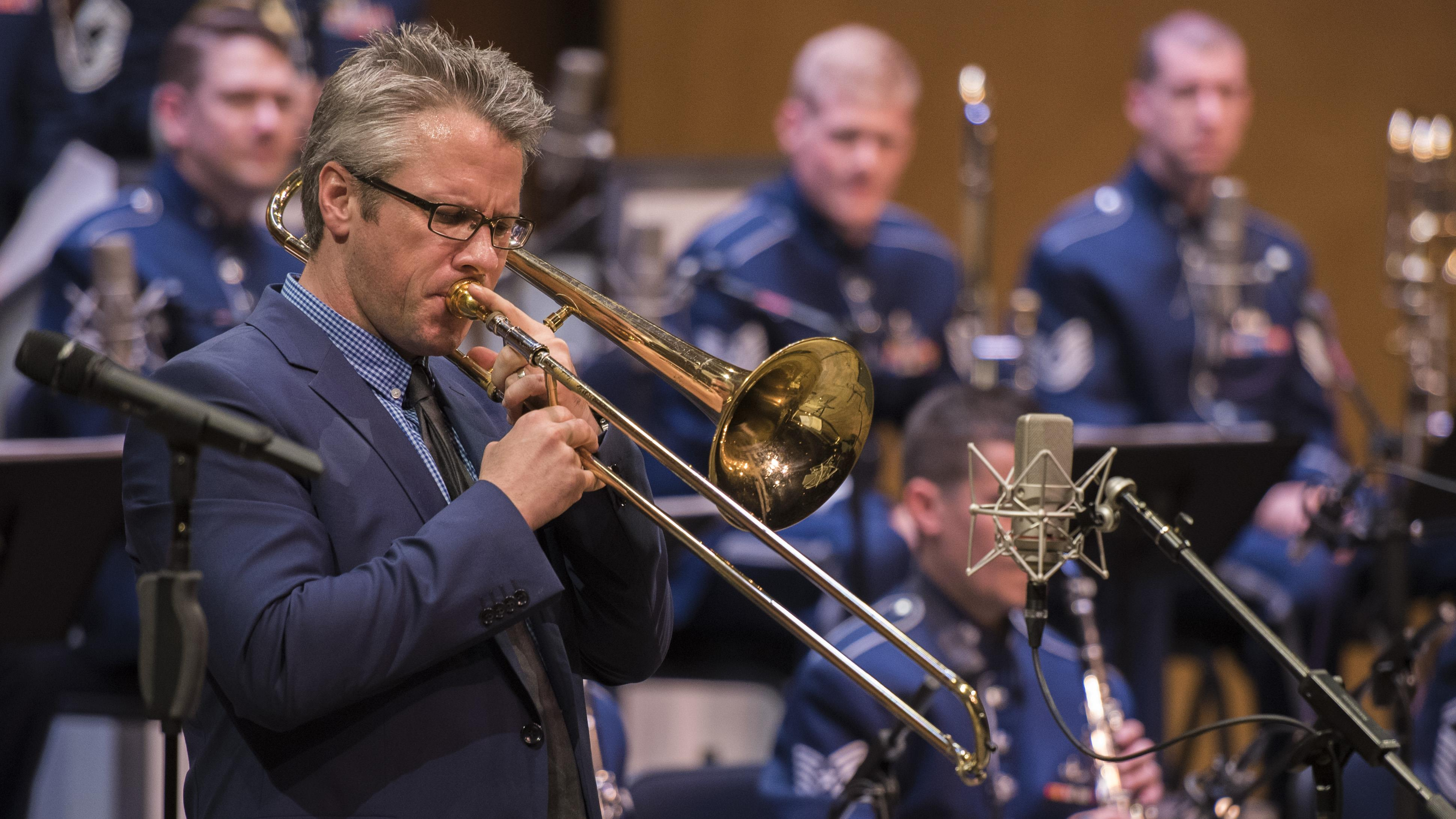
Gilkes performing as a guest in the Airmen of Note's Jazz Heritage Series, Alexandria, Virginia, 2017

Gilkes played in the Maria Schneider Orchestra and David Berger's Sultans of Swing. He is a member of the Edmar Castañeda Trio as well as the Slide Monsters trombone quartet, consisting of Gilkes, Eijiro Nakagawa, Joseph Alessi, and Brandt Attema. He has performed with the Vanguard Jazz Orchestra, the Duke Ellington Orchestra, Stanley Turrentine, and Benny Golson. In the Latin music community, he has performed with Machito, Giovanni Hidalgo, Chico O'Farrill, Tito Nieves, the Big 3 Palladium Orchestra, Raulín Rosendo, Ray Sepúlveda, Eddie Santiago, José Alberto "El Canario", and Iroko La Banda. He played in the 2000–2001 U.S. and Japanese tours of the Broadway musical Swing!.

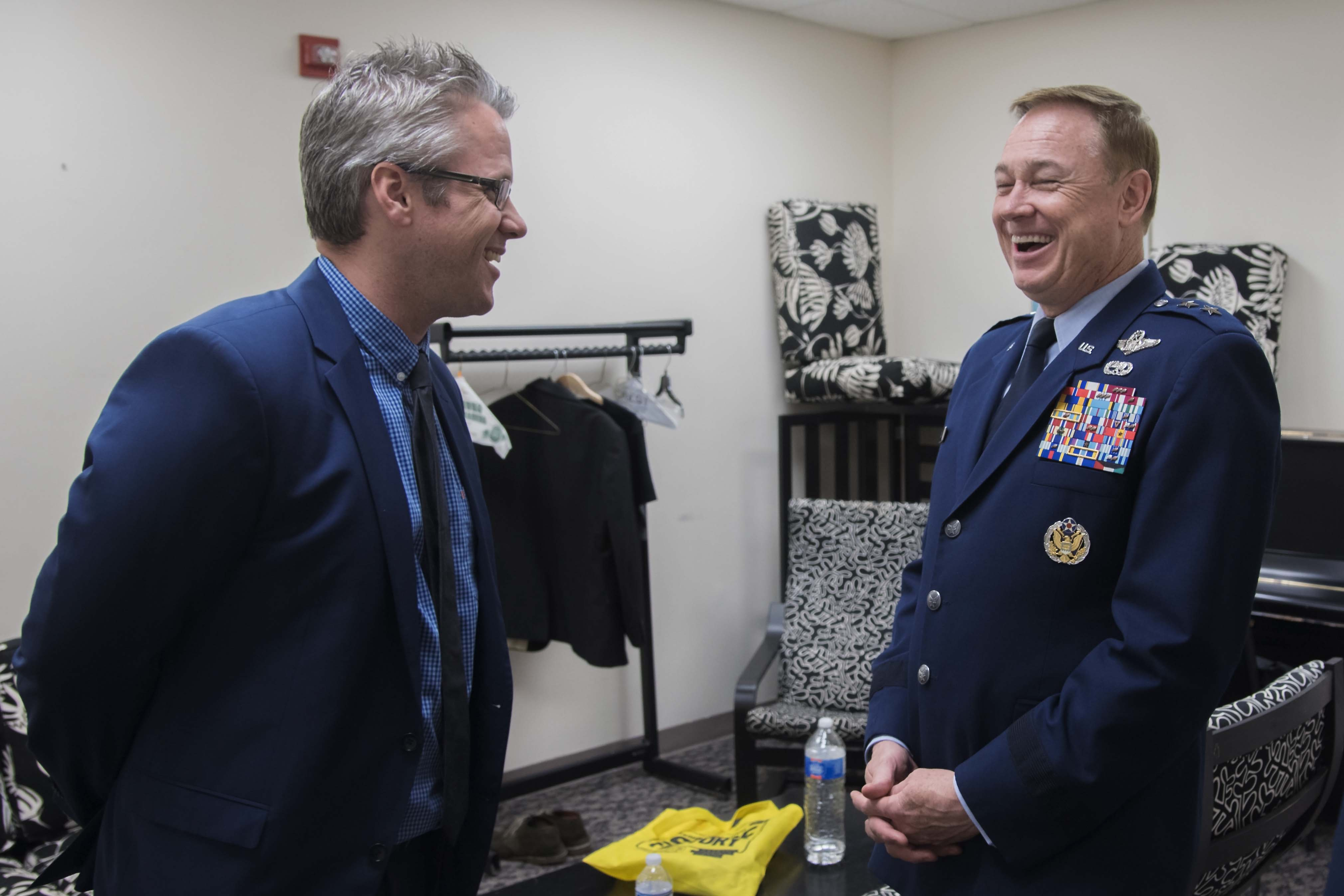
Gilkes with Maj. Gen. Darryl W. Burke, Air Force District of Washington and 320th Air Expeditionary Wing commander, 2017

Gilkes has toured extensively throughout Europe, Asia, Latin America, and South America. Previous performance engagements include the Umbria Jazz Festival, Vienna Jazz Festival, JVC Jazz Festival (renamed the Newport Jazz Festival), Telluride Jazz Festival, Panama Jazz Festival, Lincoln Center, Tokyo's Orchard Hall, and the Moscow Conservatory. In March 2008, he was invited to perform with the jazz drummer Billy Cobham and the Adelaide Philharmonic at the Adelaide Festival of Arts in Australia. He has also performed with bassists Carlos Henriquez and Richard Bona, harpist Edmar Castañeda, pianist Makoto Ozone, and the Vanguard Jazz Orchestra. He was a guest performer at the International Trombone Festival on May 28–31, 2008 in Salt Lake City, Utah.

With the exception of one track, he composed new material for his 2004 album Edenderry. It received excellent reviews from, among others, JazzTimes, All About Jazz, and the Trombone Journal.

In 2010, he became a full-time member of the Grammy Award–winning WDR Big Band. In February 2015, he released his album Köln, his first fronting a big band. Köln received two Grammy nominations for Best Large Jazz Ensemble Album and Best Instrumental Composition. Gilkes has also won the JazzTimes Trombonist of the Year, in 2018.

Gilkes also partnered with the trombone manufacturer S.E. Shires Co. to release a custom artist model trombone.

== Discography ==
=== As leader ===
- Edenderry (Alternate Side, 2004)
- Lost Words (Alternate Side, 2008)
- Sound Stories (Alternate Side, 2012)
- Köln (Alternate Side, 2015) with the WDR Big Band
