= Sant Andreu Jazz Band =

Jazz band from Barcelona, Spain

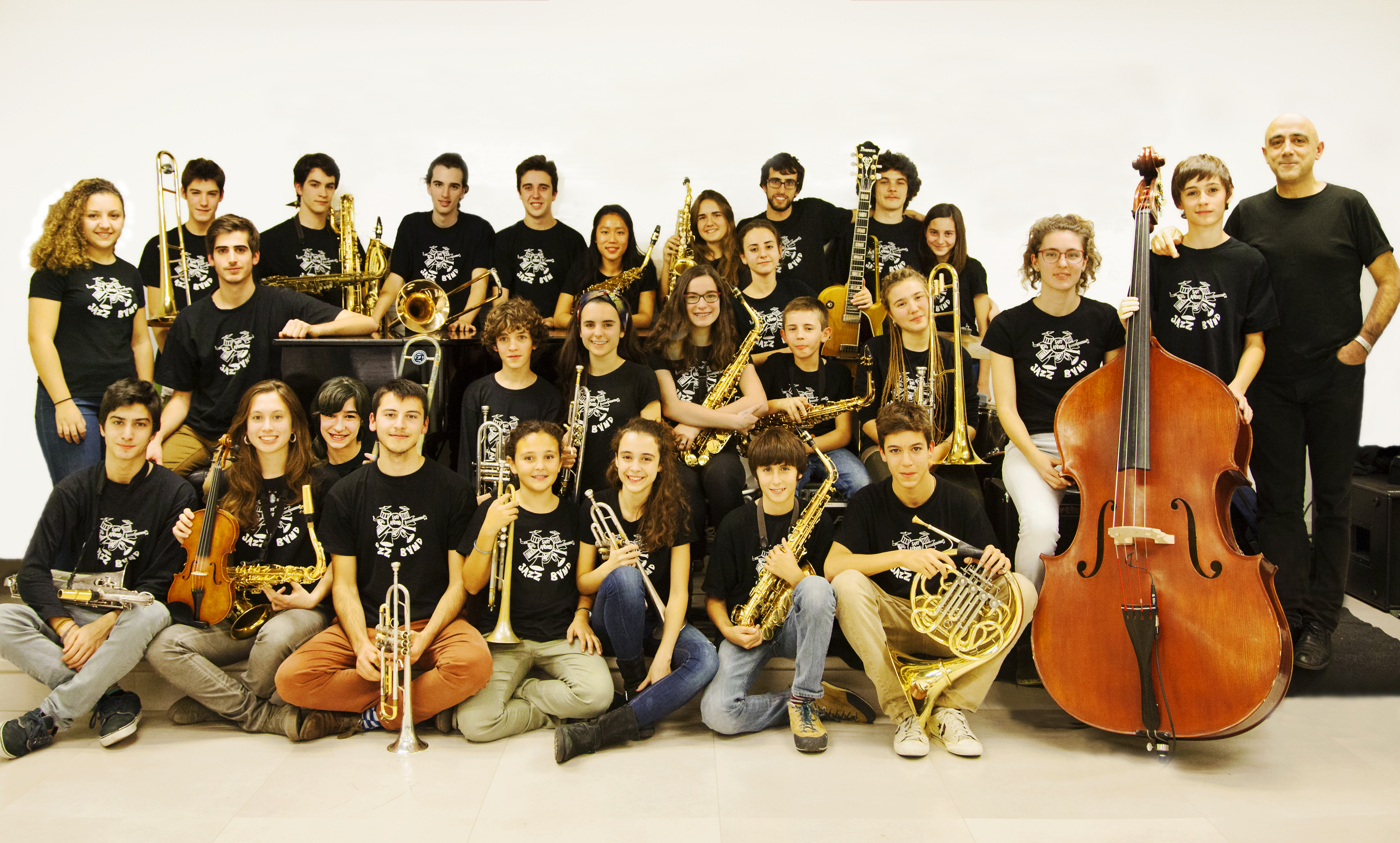
2016

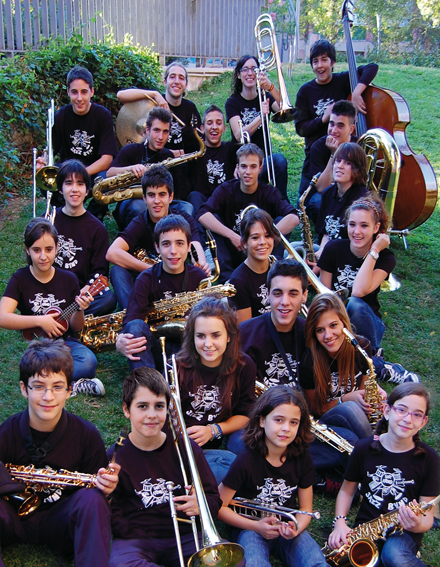
2010

Sant Andreu Jazz Band is a youth jazz band from Barcelona, featuring 7- to 20-year-olds. The bandleader is Joan Chamorro.

== History ==
The band was founded in 2006 at Escola Municipal de Música de Sant Andreu. The band has performed at numerous concerts and festivals in Catalonia, and other regions of Spain as well as in neighbouring countries (for example France, Switzerland, Denmark)).. They released their first live CD/DVD Jazzing: Live at Casa Fuster in 2009, featuring alongside established jazz musicians, the precocious 14-year-old, Andrea Motis among other young talents.

2010 was a breakthrough year for the band, with appearances at more than 20 festivals including Valls, Terrassa, Girona, Barcelona, Platja d'Aro, and venues like el Jamboree, Palau de la Música Catalana, JazzSi, Hotel Casa Fuster, featuring international performers like Dick Oatts, Ken Peplowski, Bobby Gordon, Perico Sambeat, Ignasi Terraza, Matthew Simon, and Esteve Pi. The band also released their second recording Jazzing vol.2.

In 2012 the film director Ramón Tort made the documentary A film about kids and music based on the band's work and efforts. The film was awarded best feature film at the Lights. Camera. Help. festival in Austin, Texas, US in 2013.

In 2021, Sant Andreu Jazz Band celebrated their 15-year-anniversary with concerts during the Barcelona jazz festivals. They received the 2021 Alícia prize "for the Educational Project", awarded by the Acadèmia Catalana de la Música.

Small combos of older members perform worldwide, for example with WDR Big Band in Cologne and in Bengaluru (India)

Several band members have contended in international jazz after their time in the band, particularly Andrea Motis, Alba Armengou, Elsa Armengou, and Rita Payés.

== Discography ==
- 2009: Jazzing 1 (Live at Casa Fuster Barcelona)
- 2011: Jazzing 2
- 2012: Jazzing 3 Live at el Palau de la Música (featuring Terell Stafford, Wycliffe Gordon, Jesse Davis, Ricard Gili, Josep Traver and Esteve Pi)
- 2012 A film about Kids and Music Sant Andreu Jazz Band
- 2014: Jazzing 4 vol. 1 and 2 (two CDs) (with Dick Oatts, Scott Robinson, Scott Hamilton, Victor Correa, Ricard Gili and Ignasi Terraza)
- 2015: Jazzing 5 (featuring Scott Robinson, Dick Oatts, Perico Sambeat, Ignasi Terraza, Josep Traver, Esteve Pi, Josep Maria Farràs, Toni Belenguer and Curro Gálvez)
- 2016: Jazzing 6 vol. 1 and 2 (two CDs) (featuring John Allred, Joel Frahm, Luigi Grasso, Jon-Erik Kellso, Ignasi Terraza, Josep Traver and Esteve Pi)
- 2017: Jazzing 7 (featuring Luigi Grasso, Enrique Oliver, Ignasi Terraza, Josep Traver, Esteve Pi, Toni Belenguer, Eva Fernández and Magali Datzira)
- 2018: Jazzing 8 vol. 1 + 2 + 3 (three CDs) (featuring Perico Sambeat, Luigi Grasso, Joe Magnarelli, Fredrik Norén, Christoph Mallinger, Andrea Motis, Pasquale Grasso, Luca Pisani, Ignasi Terraza, Josep Traver and Esteve Pi)
- 2019: Jazzing 9 vol. 1 + 2
- 2020: Jazzing 9 vol. 3
- 2020: Jazzing 10 vol. 1 + 2 + 3 (three CDs)
- 2021: Jazzzing 11 vol. 1
- 2022: Jazzing 11 vol. 2 + 3 small groups at the jazz house
- 2022: Jazzing 11 vol. 4 la magia de la veu
- 2022: Jazzing 12 vol. 1
- 2022: Jazzing 12 vol. 2 Jazz Party Celebration 15 Years
- 2022: Joan Chamorro Presenta's Big Band with the alumni Èlia Bastida, Joana Casanova, Joan Codina, Magalí Datzíra, Jan Domènech, Eva Fernández, Joan Marti, Marc Martín, Andrea Motis, Carla Motis, Rita Payés, Marçal Perramón, Joan Mar Sauqué and Max Tato
- 2023: Sant Andreu abraça Brasil with multiple guest stars
- 2023: Jazzing 13 - Passing the torch, including Marc Trepat, Ricard and Toni Gili of the former Locomotora Negra band
- 2024: Jazzing 14 vol. 1 + 2
