= WDR Big Band =

Big band of Westdeutscher Rundfunk (WDR) in Cologne, Germany

Background information
- Origin: Cologne, Germany
- Genres: Jazz; big band
- Years active: 1957–present
- Website: www1.wdr.de/orchester-und-chor/bigband

The WDR Big Band (pronounced [ˌveːdeːˈʔɛʁ] VAY-DAY-ERR) is the jazz big band of the German public broadcaster Westdeutscher Rundfunk (WDR), located in Cologne, Germany.

== History ==
=== Origins ===
After World War II, the Kölner Rundfunk-Tanzorchester (Cologne Radio Dance Orchestra) was active from 1947 at the Cologne radio station of Nordwestdeutscher Rundfunk (NWDR). The orchestra was renamed Kölner Tanz- und Unterhaltungsorchester (KTUO, Dance and Entertainment Orchestra of Cologne) in the same year, 1947.

On 1 January 1956, NWDR was divided into Norddeutscher Rundfunk (NDR, Hamburg) and WDR, in Cologne, which assumed the orchestra.

=== Orchestra Kurt Edelhagen ===
When WDR developed an interest in jazz, in 1957, Kurt Edelhagen was commissioned to set up a jazz big band in parallel to KTUO. He gathered staff from various European countries for the new Orchestra Kurt Edelhagen, an independent band. For 15 years, it successfully played, broadcast and recorded in Cologne. In 1972, Edelhagen's annual work contract with WDR was terminated by the broadcaster, which meant the end of his big band.

=== WDR Dance Orchestra and Big Band ===
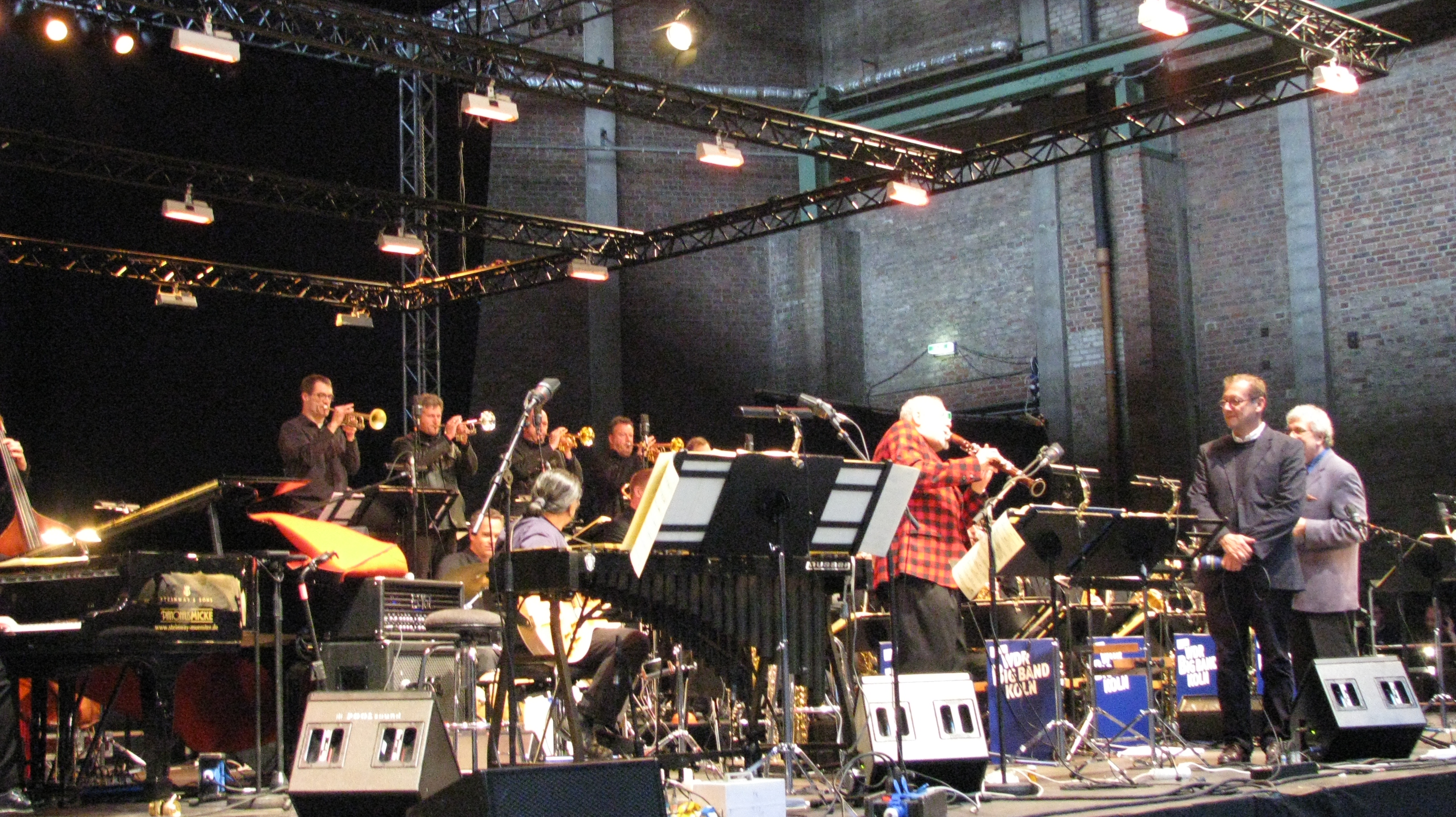
WDR Big Band, Cologne (2009)

All the time, the KTUO, true to its name, continued to present "Dance and Entertainment" music. In 1967, Werner Müller took over the orchestra, renamed it WDR Tanzorchester Werner Müller, and played in parallel to the Edelhagen Band on WDR until these were dismantled in 1972. In 1980, this Tanzorchester was renamed WDR Big Band. Later, from 1985 to 1994, Jerry van Rooyen was the musical director. Richmond wrote about this era, "Under the direction of van Rooyen, the band made perhaps its biggest strides musically, and enjoyed visibility on an international level."

== In the present ==
In 2016, Bob Mintzer was engaged as chief conductor, and Vince Mendoza was introduced as the band's new "Composer in Residence".

The WDR Big Band frequently invites jazz musicians to joint projects. It performs in concerts in WDR's home region, North Rhine-Westphalia, Germany, and worldwide. Many of the concerts become part of WDR's on air programming and on social media (e.g. Facebook and YouTube).

The WDR Big Band also takes part in the school concert program "WDR macht Schule" ("WDR catches on") which, in 2022, included a concert with four young musicians of the Sant Andreu Jazz Band from Barcelona and their director Joan Chamorro. Before, in 2021, Andrea Motis (trumpet, vocals), an alumna of this Spanish youth band, visited the WDR Big Band to record Colors and Shadows.

WDR Big Band has released WDR Big Band Play Along App for Android and iOS, allowing musicians to play virtually with the Band.

WDR Big Band has received several awards.

== Band members ==
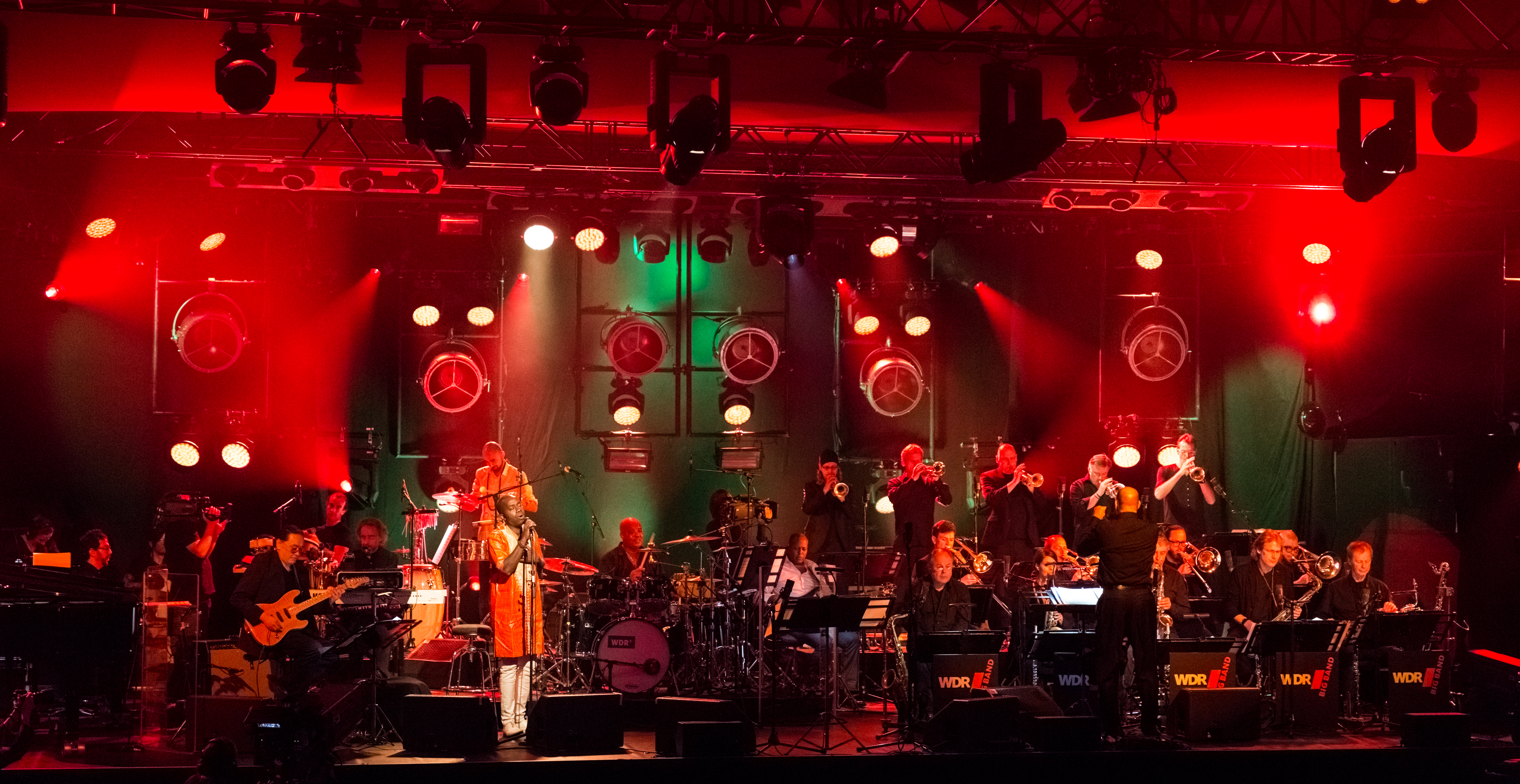
WDR Big Band featuring Mokhtar Samba live at the Leverkusener Jazztage, 2016

As of 2024, the band's lineup consists of:

- Saxophones: Johan Hörlén (lead asax), Karolina Strassmayer (asax), Paul Heller (tsax), Ben Fitzpatrick (tsax), Jens Neufang (barsax)
- Trumpets: Andy Haderer, Rob Bruynen, Wim Both, Ruud Breuls
- Trombones: Ludwig Nuss, Raphael Klemm, Andy Hunter, Mattis Cederberg (btrn)
- Rhythm section: Billy Test (piano), John Goldsby (bass), Hans Dekker (drums)

In 2004, Strassmayer was the first woman to join the orchestra. From 2014 to 2019, the orchestra also included a female trombone player, Shannon Barnett.

== Awards ==
The WDR Big Band has six times been nominated for a Grammy Award and won or contributed to four Grammy Awards.

At the 49th Grammy Awards of 2006, the band's album Some Skunk Funk, recorded at the Leverkusener Jazztage 2003, directed by Mendoza and featuring Will Lee and Randy and Michael Brecker, was awarded "Best album by a large jazz ensemble". In parallel, Michael Brecker posthumously received the Grammy for "Best Jazz Instrumental Solo" for the same song.

In 2008, at the 50th Grammy Awards celebration, the joint production between WDR Big Band and the singer Patti Austin, titled Avant Gershwin, was voted "Best Jazz Vocal Album" of the year. WDR Big Band with Mendoza won another Grammy in the category "Best Instrumental Arrangement" for the arrangement of "In a Silent Way", composed by Joe Zawinul. The recording is part of the live double album Brown Street, released in 2006.

In January 2021, WDR Big Band received the "2020 Innovation Award" by the German Orchestra Foundation for the "WDR Big Band Play Along App".

In 2021, their production Live at the Philharmonie, Cologne, conducted by Bill Laurance, won the Deutscher Jazzpreis (German Jazz Award) in the category "Rundfunkproduktion des Jahres" (broadcast production of the year).

== Discography (selection) ==
See WDR Big Band on MusicBrainz and individual sources

Year Released	Title	Label	Notes / Personnel
1982	The Third Stone	Koala	Jiggs Whigham, Bill Holman, Mel Lewis, WDR Big Band And Strings
1984	Harlem Story	Koala	[2LP] WDR Big Band • Leitung Peter Herbolzheimer
1991	East Coast Blowout	Lipstick	Jim McNeely feat. Marc Johnson, John Scofield, Adam Nussbaum and WDR Big Band
1992	Traces of Trane	JMT	Peter Herborn
1992	Carambolage	CMP	Joachim Kühn
1996	Swing & Balladen	BMG Ariola	Jerry van Rooyen
1998	Your Song	BMG Ariola	Jerry van Rooyen
2000	WDR Bigband	NRW	Jan Klare/Eckard Koltermann
2000	Kurt Weill – American Songs	Bear Family	Caterina Valente
2002	Dedalo	Enja	Gianluigi Trovesi
2002	Colours of Siam	In+Out	Thorsten Wollmann, WDR Big Band Cologne featuring Hayden Chisholm
2004	Tango y postango	NRW	Néstor Marconi, Ernst Reijseger, Mark Walker and the WDR Big Band Cologne
2004	NiedeckenKoeln	Capitol	Wolfgang Niedecken and WDR Big Band Cologne
2004	Midnight Jam	ESC	Joe Zawinul (Live at Zawinul's 70th birthday party at the Leverkusener Jazztage)
2005	Some Skunk Funk	BHM; Telarc (US)	Randy Brecker with Michael Brecker (Live); (2x Grammy Award)
2005	Plays the Music of Jimi Hendrix	BHM	with Hiram Bullock and Billy Cobham
2006	Djangology	Dreyfus Jazz	[2CD] Biréli Lagrène and WDR Big Band Cologne (Live)
2006	Winterwunderwelt	Roof Music	Götz Alsmann and WDR Big Band Cologne
2006	Brown Street	Intuition	Joe Zawinul and WDR Big Band Cologne (Live in Vienna) (Grammy Award)
2007	Avant Gershwin	Rendezvous Music	Patti Austin and WDR Big Band Cologne (Grammy Award)
2008	Vans Joint	BHM	Bill Evans w/ Dave Weckl, Mark Egan & WDR Big Band Cologne (Live)
2011	Mit großem Besteck	Edel	Pe Werner and WDR Big Band
2014	My Personal Songbook	In+Out	Ron Carter and WDR Big Band Cologne
2015	Köln	Alternate Side	Marshall Gilkes and WDR Big Band Cologne
2015	Big Band Boom	Jazzline	Metro and WDR Big Band Cologne
2016	Steppin' Out	Jazzline	Steps Ahead / WDR Big Band Cologne
2017	Homecoming	Jazzline	Vince Mendoza and WDR Big Band; nominated to 60th Annual Grammy Awards
2018	Always Forward	Alternate Side	Marshall Gilkes and WDR Big Band
2019	Live at the Philharmonie, Cologne	Jazzline	Bill Laurance and WDR Big Band; Deutscher Jazzpreis recipient (Live)
2019	Begin Again	Palmetto	Fred Hersch and WDR Big Band Cologne
2020	Storytellers	Sunnyside	Luciana Souza and WDR Big Band Cologne
2020	Blue Soul	Strikezone	Dave Stryker with Bob Mintzer and WDR Big Band
2020	Jackets XL	Mack Avenue	Yellowjackets + WDR Big Band; nominated to 64th Annual Grammy Awards
2021	Colors and Shadows	Jazzline	Andrea Motis and WDR Big Band
2022	Center Stage	Leopard	Steve Gadd / Eddie Gomez / Ronnie Cuber / WDR Big Band; nominated to 65th Annual Grammy Awards
2026	In the Brass Palace	Big Shoulders	Kurt Elling and WDR Big Band

== Literature ==
- Richmond, Gabriela A. (2011). The WDR Big Band: A Brief History (M. Mus.). University of Nebraska–Lincoln.

== See also ==
- Studio for Electronic Music (WDR)
- WDR Symphony Orchestra Cologne (WDR Sinfonieorchester Köln)
- WDR Funkhausorchester
- WDR Rundfunkchor Köln
