= Scott Hamilton (musician) =

American jazz saxophonist (born 1954)

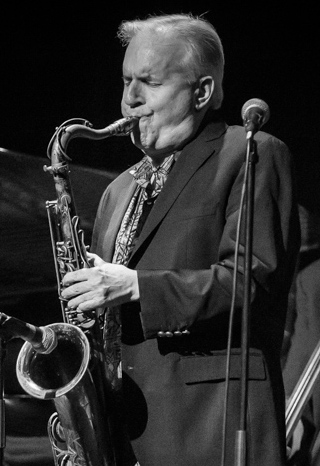
- Scott Hamilton in 2015

Background information
- Born: September 12, 1954 (age 72); Providence, Rhode Island, U.S.
- Genres: Jazz; Swing music; Straight-ahead jazz
- Occupation: Musician
- Instrument: Tenor saxophone
- Years active: 1970s–present
- Website: scotthamiltonsax.com

Scott Hamilton (born September 12, 1954) is an American jazz tenor saxophonist associated with swing and straight-ahead jazz. His eldest son, Shō Īmura, is the vocalist of the Japanese rock band Okamoto's.

== Career ==
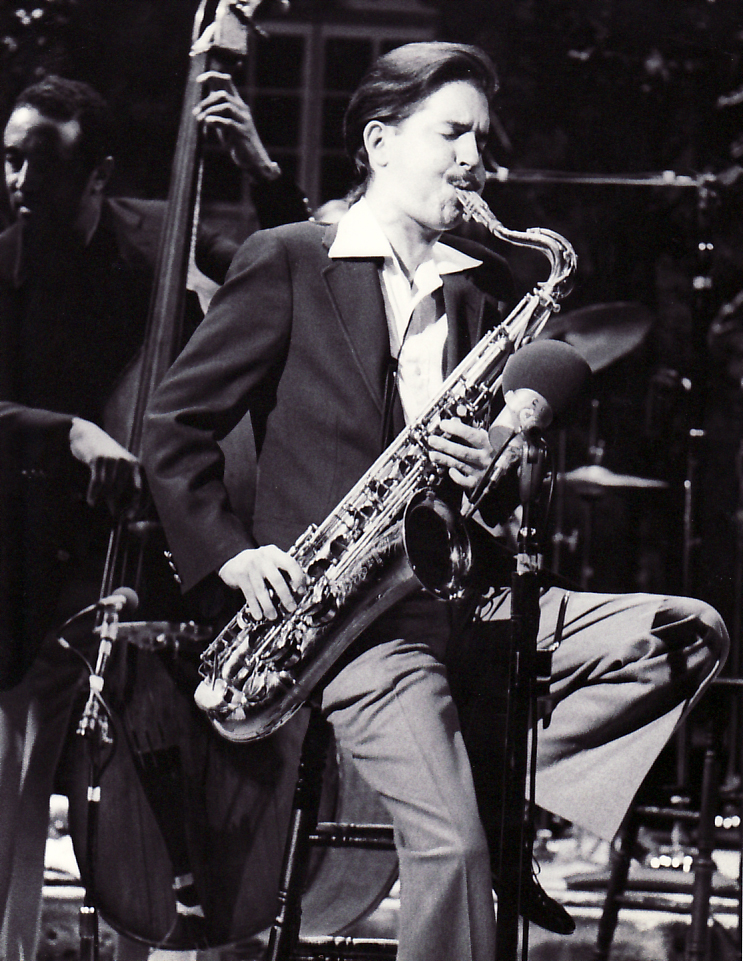
Ray Brown (left) and Scott Hamilton in 1979

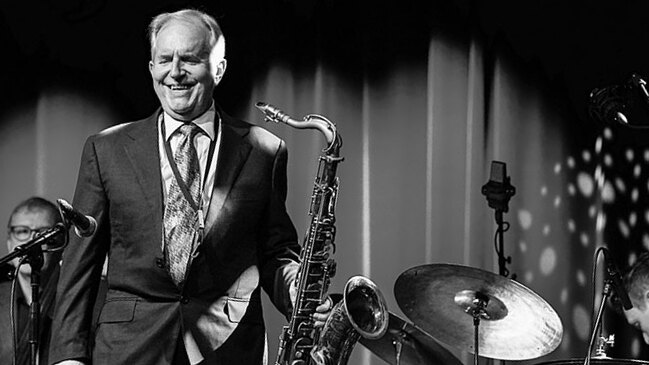
Scott Hamilton in Aarhus, Denmark, 2018

He was born in Providence, Rhode Island, United States. Hamilton began to play the tenor saxophone at the age of sixteen. In 1976, he moved to New York City and played with Benny Goodman at the end of the decade. Most often he has been the leader of bands. He has worked with Ruby Braff and Warren Vache.

He recorded his first significant jazz album as a leader for Chiaroscuro in 1977. The same year, he proceeded to record his first album for Concord, with whom he maintained a long recording career as a solo act, and as a member of the Concord Jazz All Stars. He accompanied singer Rosemary Clooney in the studio and on the road for a decade.

During the 1980s, he toured Japan, Sweden, the UK, and performed at the Grande Parade du Jazz in Nice, France. In the 1990s, he moved to London and formed a quartet with John Pearce, Dave Green, and Steve Brown. In 2007, he made a guest appearance at the Brecon Jazz Festival, accompanied by Humphrey Lyttelton and his band. Part of this concert was shown on BBC Four as Humph's Last Stand, a tribute to Lyttelton following his death in 2008. In 2013 and 2014, 2018 and 2021 Hamilton worked with Andrea Motis and Joan Chamorro in Spain.

== Discography ==
=== As leader/co-leader ===
- Scott Hamilton Is a Good Wind Who Is Blowing Us No Ill (Concord Jazz, 1977)
- Scott Hamilton 2 (Concord Jazz, 1978)
- Scott Hamilton and Warren Vache (with Scott's Band in New York) (Concord Jazz, 1978)
- Live at Concord '77 with Ross Tompkins, Joe Venuti, Ray Brown, Jake Hanna (Concord Jazz, 1978)
- Back to Back with Buddy Tate (Concord Jazz, 1979)
- No Bass Hit with Jake Hanna, Dave McKenna (Concord Jazz, 1979)
- Tenorshoes (Concord Jazz, 1980)
- Skyscrapers with Warren Vache (Concord Jazz, 1980)
- Apples and Oranges (Concord Jazz, 1981)
- Scott's Buddy with Buddy Tate (Concord Jazz, 1981)
- Close Up (Concord Jazz, 1982)
- Tour De Force with Al Cohn (Concord Jazz, 1982)
- The Second Set with John Bunch (piano), Phil Flanigan (upright bass), Chris Flory (guitar) and Chuck Riggs (drums) as The Scott Hamilton Quintet (Concord Jazz, 1984). Recorded live at the Yamaha Hall, Tōkyō, Japan, June 1983.
- A First with Ruby Braff (Concord Jazz, 1985)
- A Sailboat in the Moonlight with Ruby Braff (Concord Jazz, 1986)
- Major League with Jake Hanna, Dave McKenna (Concord Jazz, 1986)
- A Sound Investment with Flip Phillips (Concord Jazz, 1987)
- Plays Ballads (Concord Jazz, 1989)
- Radio City (Concord Jazz, 1990)
- The Gene Harris/Scott Hamilton Quintet: At Last (Concord Jazz, 1990)
- Groovin' High with Ken Peplowski, Spike Robinson (Concord Jazz, 1992)
- Race Point with Gerald Wiggins, Andy Simpkins, Jeff Hamilton, Howard Alden (Concord Jazz, 1992)
- Concord All-Stars on Cape Cod with Dave McKenna, Gray Sargent, Marshall Wood, Chuck Riggs, Carol Sloane, (Concord Jazz, 1992)
- Scott Hamilton with Strings (Concord Jazz, 1993)
- East of the Sun (Concord Jazz, 1993)
- Organic Duke (Concord Jazz, 1994)
- Live at the Brecon Jazz Festival (Concord Jazz, 1995)
- Groovin' High: Live at EJ's (JLR, 1996)
- My Romance (Concord Jazz, 1996)
- After Hours (Concord Jazz, 1997)
- Christmas Love Song (Concord Jazz, 1997)
- Late Night Christmas Eve (Concord Jazz, 1997)
- The Red Door: Remember Zoot Sims with Bucky Pizzarelli (Concord, 1998)
- Blues Bop & Ballads (Concord Jazz, 1999)
- Jazz Signatures (Concord Jazz, 2001)
- Scott Hamilton Quartet Live in London (Concord Jazz, 2003)
- Heavy Juice with Harry Allen (Concord Jazz, 2004)
- Back in New York (Concord Jazz, 2005)
- Nocturnes & Serenades (Concord Jazz, 2006)
- Live at Jazztone Loerrach with Olaf Polziehn (Satin Doll, 2006)
- Zootcase with Alan Barnes (Woodville 2007)
- Across the Tracks (Concord Jazz, 2008)
- Mainstream Giants of Jazz (Robinwood, 2009)
- Scott Hamilton with Sandro Gibellini, Aldo Zunino, Alfred Kramer (Spazi Sonori, Livorno 2009)
- Midnight at Nola's Penthouse with Rossano Sportiello (Arbors, 2010)
- Hi-Ya with Alan Barnes (Woodville, 2010)
- A Splendid Trio with Howard Alden and Frank Tate (Arbors, 2011)
- Tight but Loose with Dusko Goykovich (Organic, 2011)
- Scott Hamilton Meets Jesper Thilo (Stunt, 2011)
- How About You with Bernard Pichl (Organic, 2011)
- 'Round Midnight with Harry Allen (Challenge, 2012)
- Remembering Billie (Blue Duchess, 2013)
- Swedish Ballads & More with Jan Lundgren (Stunt, 2013)
- I Could Write a Book with Andrea Pozza (Fone, 2013)
- Live at Smalls (Smallslive, 2014)
- Scott Hamilton Plays with the Dany Doriz Caveau de la Huchette Orchestra (Frémeaux & Associés, 2014)
- Bean and the Boys with Paolo Birro and Alfred Kramer (Fone, 2015)
- Who Cares? with Andrea Pozza (Fone, 2015)
- Live in Bern with Jeff Hamilton (Capri, 2015)
- Second Time Around with Dusko Goykovich (Organic, 2015)
- Scott Hamilton Plays Jule Styne (Blue Duchess, 2015)
- The Shadow of Your Smile (Blau, 2016)
- Live! with Harry Allen (Gac 2016)
- La Rosita (Blau, 2016)
- The Best Things in Life with Karin Krog (Stunt, 2016)
- Ballads for Audiophiles with Paolo Birro, Alfred Kramer, Aldo Zunino (Fone, 2017)
- Triple Treat with Leah Kline, Francesca Tandoi (2017)
- Meets the Piano Players (Organic, 2017)
- The Things We Did Last Summer with Champian Fulton (Blau, 2017)
- Moon Mist (Blau, 2018)
- Street of Dreams (Blau, 2019)
- Danish Ballads... & More (Stunt, 2019)
- Poinciana (Fonè Jazz, 2021)
- Classics (Stunt, 2022)

=== As sideman ===
With Harry Allen

- Just You, Just Me (BMG/Novus, 2003)
- Stompin' the Blues (Arbors, 2008)

With Ruby Braff

- A First (Concord Jazz, 1985)
- A Sailboat In The Moonlight (Concord Jazz 1986)
- Mr. Braff to You (Phontastic, 1986)
- Volume One (Concord Jazz, 1991)
- Volume Two (Concord Jazz, 1992)
- For the Last Time (Arbors, 2008)

With Charlie Byrd

- It's a Wonderful World (Concord Jazz, 1989)
- My Inspiration (Concord Picante, 1999)

With Rosemary Clooney

- Everything's Coming Up Rosie (Concord Jazz, 1977)
- Here's to My Lady (Concord Jazz, 1979)
- Rosemary Clooney Sings the Lyrics of Ira Gershwin (Concord Jazz, 1980)
- With Love (Concord Jazz, 1981)
- Rosemary Clooney Sings the Music of Cole Porter (Concord Jazz, 1982)
- Rosemary Clooney Sings the Music of Harold Arlen (Concord Jazz, 1983)
- Rosemary Clooney Sings the Music of Irving Berlin (Concord Jazz, 1984)
- Rosemary Clooney Sings Ballads (Concord, 1985)
- Rosemary Clooney Sings the Music of Jimmy Van Heusen (Concord Jazz, 1986)
- Rosemary Clooney Sings the Lyrics of Johnny Mercer (Concord Jazz, 1987)
- Show Tunes (Concord Jazz, 1989)
- Do You Miss New York? (Concord Jazz, 1993)

With Woody Herman

- Presents a Concord Jam Volume 1 (Concord Jazz, 1981)
- A Great American Evening Vol. 3 (Concord Jazz 1983)

With Eddie Higgins

- Smoke Gets in Your Eyes (Venus, 2001)
- My Foolish Heart (Venus, 2002)
- My Funny Valentine (Venus, 2004)
- Christmas Songs 2 (Venus, 2006)
- It's Magic (Venus, 2006)
- A Handful of Stars (Venus, 2009)

With Duke Robillard

- Swing (Rounder, 1987)
- A Swinging Session with Duke Robillard (DixieFrog, 2008)

With Maxine Sullivan

- Uptown (Concord Jazz, 1985)
- Swingin' Sweet (Concord Jazz, 1988)

With Cal Tjader

- The Shining Sea (Concord Jazz, 1981)
- Both Sides of the Coin (Concord Picante, 2001)

With others

- Karrin Allyson, Scott Hamilton, Concord Jazz Festival All-Stars, Fujitsu-Concord 27th Jazz Festival (Concord 1996)
- Tony Bennett & k.d. lang, A Wonderful World (RPM/Columbia 2002)
- Bill Berry, For Duke (M&K, 1978)
- Ed Bickert, At Toronto's Bourbon Street (Concord Jazz, 1983)
- Ray Brown, At Last (Concord Jazz, 1990)
- Jimmy Bruno, Live at Birdland II (Concord Jazz, 1999)
- John Bunch, John's Other Bunch (Famous Door, 1977)
- Benny Carter, A Gentleman and His Music (Concord Jazz, 1985)
- Dany Doriz, Scott Hamilton Plays with The Dany Doriz Caveau De La Huchette Orchestra (Fremeaux & Associes, 2014)
- Herb Ellis, At Last (Concord Jazz, 1990)
- Manfredo Fest, Oferenda (Concord Picante, 1993)
- Chris Flory, Duke Robillard, Blues in My Heart (Stony Plain, 2007)
- Chris Flory, The Chris Flory Quintet Featuring Scott Hamilton (Arbors, 2011)
- Jay Geils, Jay Geils Plays Jazz! (Stony Plain, 2005)
- Steve Goodman, Say It in Private (Asylum, 1977)
- Gene Harris, At Last (Concord Jazz, 1990)
- Harold Jones, At Last (Concord Jazz, 1990)
- Eiji Kitamura, Dear Friends (Concord Jazz, 1980)
- Brian Lemon, Roy Williams, How Long Has This Been Going On? (Zephyr, 1996)
- Tina May, I'll Take Romance (Linn, 2003)
- Susannah McCorkle, Sabia (Concord Jazz, 1990)
- Dave McKenna, No Holds Barred (Famous Door, 1979)
- Butch Miles, Miles and Miles of Swing (Famous Door, 1978)
- Andrea Motis, Live at Jamboree Barcelona (Swit 2013)
- Red Norvo, Red in New York (Famous Door, 1977)
- Gerry Mulligan, Soft Lights & Sweet Music (Concord Jazz, 1986)
- Ken Peplowski, Mr. Gentle and Mr. Cool (Concord Jazz, 1990)
- Flip Phillips, Flip Philllips Celebrates His 80th Birthday at the March of Jazz 1995 (Arbors, 2003)
- Jess Roden, The Player Not the Game (Island, 1977)
- Roomful of Blues, The First Album (Varrick 1988)
- Derek Smith, The Man I Love (Progressive, 1978)
- Larry Vuckovich, Somethin' Special (Tetrachord Music 2011)
- Warren Vaché Jr., Blues Walk (Dreamstreet, 1978)
- Bob Wilber, Bob Wilber and the Scott Hamilton Quartet (Chiaroscuro, 1977)
