= Sant Andreu de Tresponts =

Monastery in the Catalan Pyrenees, Spain

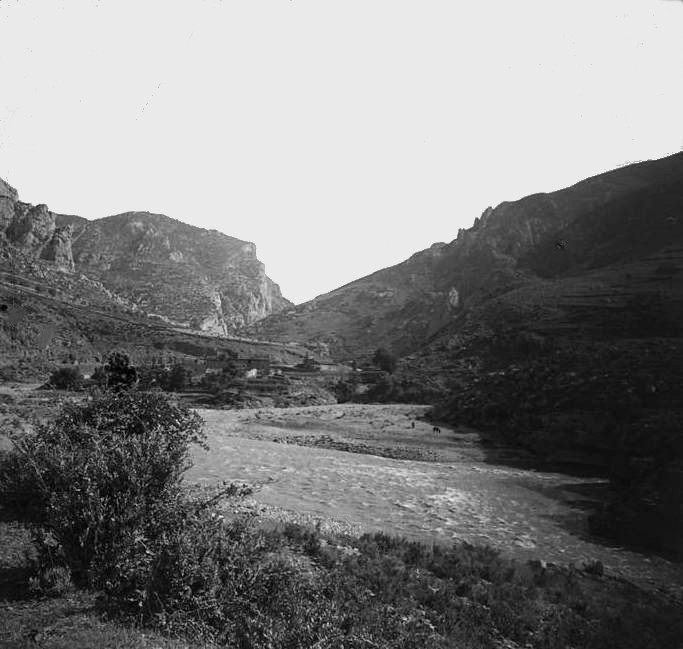
Year 1923

Sant Andreu de Tresponts is a Benedictine monastery in the Province of Lleida, Catalonia, Spain. Originally named Sant Iscle de Centelles, it was known to exist as early as 839 under Sisebut d'Urgell. It fell into decline in the 10th century until 1078 when it joined the monastery of Sant Llorenç de Morunys. By the end of the fifteenth century it was in ruins.
