= Andrea Motis =

Spanish jazz singer and trumpeter (born 1995)

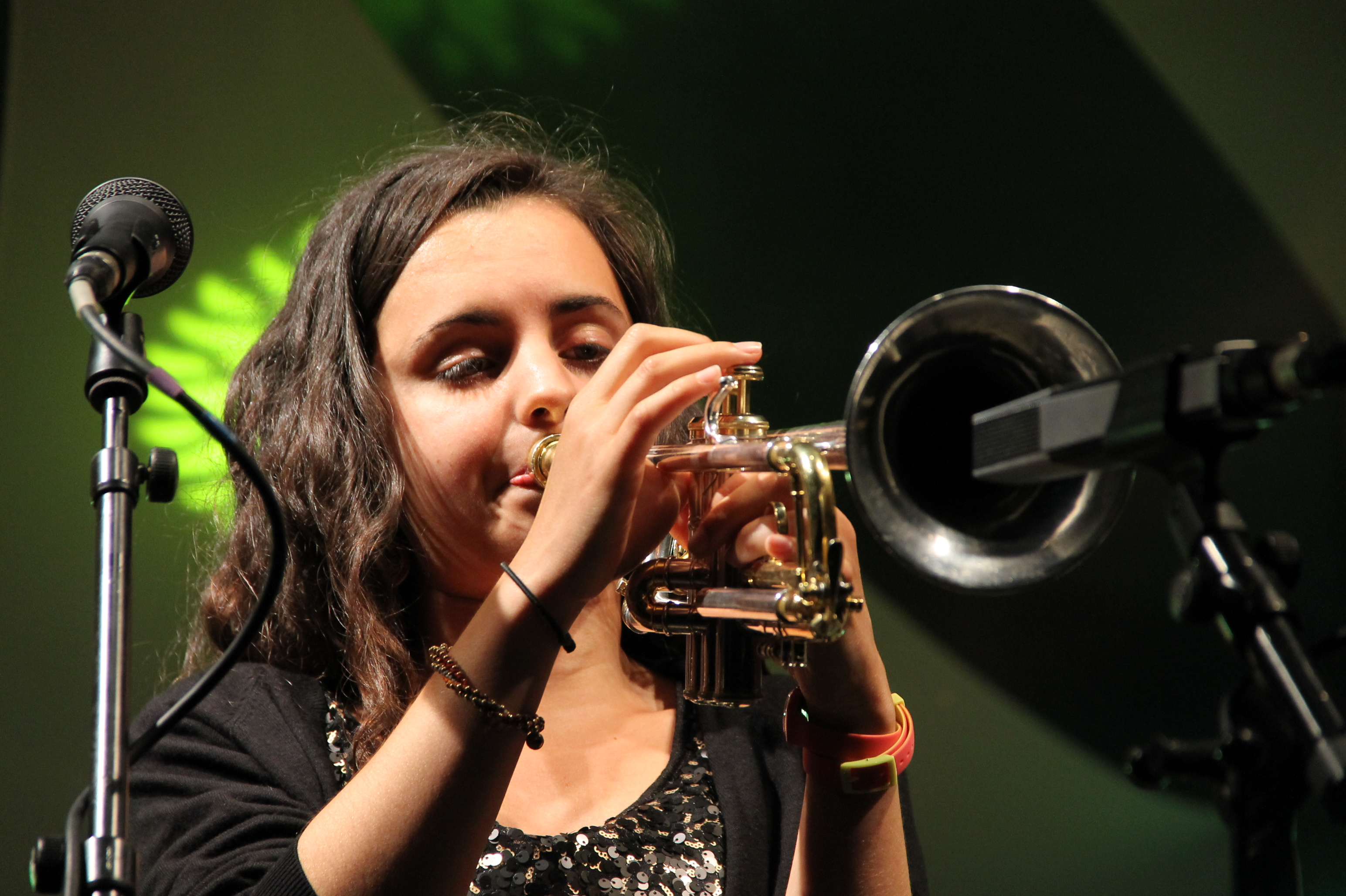
- Andrea Motis with Sant Andreu Jazz Band on 28 July 2013

Background information
- Born: 9 May 1995 (age 31); Barcelona, Spain
- Genres: Jazz; bossa nova; swing; straight-ahead jazz
- Occupations: Vocalist; musician
- Instruments: Trumpet; soprano and alto saxophone; vocals
- Years active: 2010–present
- Label: Impulse!
- Website: Official website

Andrea Motis (born 9 May 1995) is a Spanish jazz trumpeter, singer, sax player and songwriter who sings in Catalan, Spanish, Portuguese and English.

== Biography ==
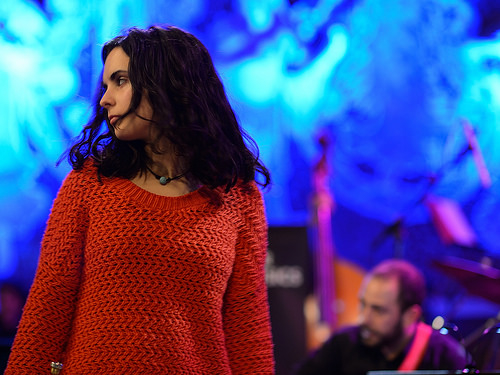
Motis performing in February 2014 at the Palau de la Música Catalana, Barcelona.

From the age of seven, Motis developed musically at the Municipal School of Music of San Andreu (Barcelona). In 2007, at twelve, she began to play in the Sant Andreu Jazz Band, led by teacher and musician Joan Chamorro.

In 2010, at the age of fifteen, she recorded an album of jazz standards, Joan Chamorro Presents Andrea Motis, featuring Bobby Gordon.

In 2012, she went on to record a second album, Feeling Good. John Fordham reviewed it when Motis played at PizzaExpress Jazz Club in 2014, stating "Motis has the kind of pearly, barely exhaled voice, paced with canny improv swerves and casual timing, from which jazz celebs are made."

From 1–4 November 2015, Motis (tp, sax, voc), Chamorro (b, ts) and Josep Traver (g) played as the opening act of Orquesta Buena Vista Social Club at their "Adiós"-tour concerts in Boston and New York. In these concerts, Omara Portuondo sang Dos Gardenias as an encore, together with Motis.

Motis made her major label debut with Emotional Dance (Impulse!, 2017). In 2019, Do outro lado do azul followed with Brazilian songs and compositions of her own. During Yo-Yo Ma's world tour entitled The Bach Project, he started the Barcelona project day on 25 September 2019 with Motis in a public park. They performed a duet of a Catalonian folk song, El cant dels ocells which has become world-famous due to the celebrated Catalonian cellist Pau Casals. Another version of this duet has been included on Yo-Yo Ma's album Notes For The Future.

In 2021, Motis, Mike Mossman and WDR Big Band Cologne produced Colors & Shadows. Loopholes (2022) is an album by the eponymous quintet led by Motis and her husband Christoph Mallinger, an Austrian jazz chordophonist.

== Private life ==
In October, 2020, Motis announced the birth of her son.

== Discography ==
- Joan Chamorro presenta Andrea Motis (Temps, 2010)
- Motis Chamorro Quintet Live at Jamboree featuring Scott Hamilton (Swit, 2013)
- Live at Casa Fuster (2014)
- Feeling Good with Joan Chamorro (Temps, 2012; Whaling City Sound, 2015)
- Coses Que Es Diuen Però Que No Es Fan, NewCat, Andrea Motis Joan Chamorro (DiscMedi, 2015)
- Motis Chamorro Big Band Live (2015)
- Joan Chamorro presenta La magia de la veu (Jazz to Jazz, 2015)
- Live at Palau de la Música (Jazz to Jazz, 2015)
- He's Funny That Way (Impulse!, 2016)
- Joan Chamorro presenta La magia de la veu & jazz ensemble (Jazz to Jazz, 2016)
- Emotional Dance (Impulse!, 2017)
- Do Outro Lado Do Azul (Verve, 2019)
- Loopholes (2022)
- Febrero (Jazz To Jazz, 2024)

=== Collaborations ===
- Marato de TV3 (TVC Disc, 2011)
- Miles Tribute Big Band: Sketches of Catalonia (Mas i Mas, 2015)
- Ramon Tort: Andrea Motis, La Trompeta Silenciosa - una historia sobre el triunfo de la sencillez (DVD 2019)
- Sant Andreu Jazz Band: Jazzing 12 vol 2 (Temps Record, 2021)
- Andrea Motis, WDR Big Band Cologne, Mike Mossman: Colors & shadows (Jazzline, 2021)
- Yo-Yo Ma: Notes For The Future (Sony, 2021, Download and Streaming)
- Joan Chamorro: Joan Chamorro Presenta's Big-Band (Jazz To Jazz, 2022)
- Joan Chamorro: Remembering Toni Belenguer (Jazz To Jazz, 2022)
- with Ignasi Terraza: Intimate Conversations (2022)
