= Bobby Gordon =

Scottish footballer

Personal information
- Full name: Robert Baxter Gordon
- Date of birth: 5 September 1923
- Place of birth: Ormiston, Scotland
- Date of death: 20 October 2001 (aged 78)
- Place of death: Edinburgh, Scotland
- Position: Inside forward

Senior career*
Years	Team	Apps	(Gls)
	Armadale Thistle	?	(?)
1946–1948	Millwall	5	(0)
1948–1949	Kilmarnock	18	(1)
Total		23	(1)
- * Club domestic league appearances and goals

Robert Baxter "Bobby" Gordon (5 September 1923 – 20 October 2001), was a Scottish footballer who played as an inside forward in the Football League.
