= Joan Chamorro =

Spanish jazz musician (born 1962)

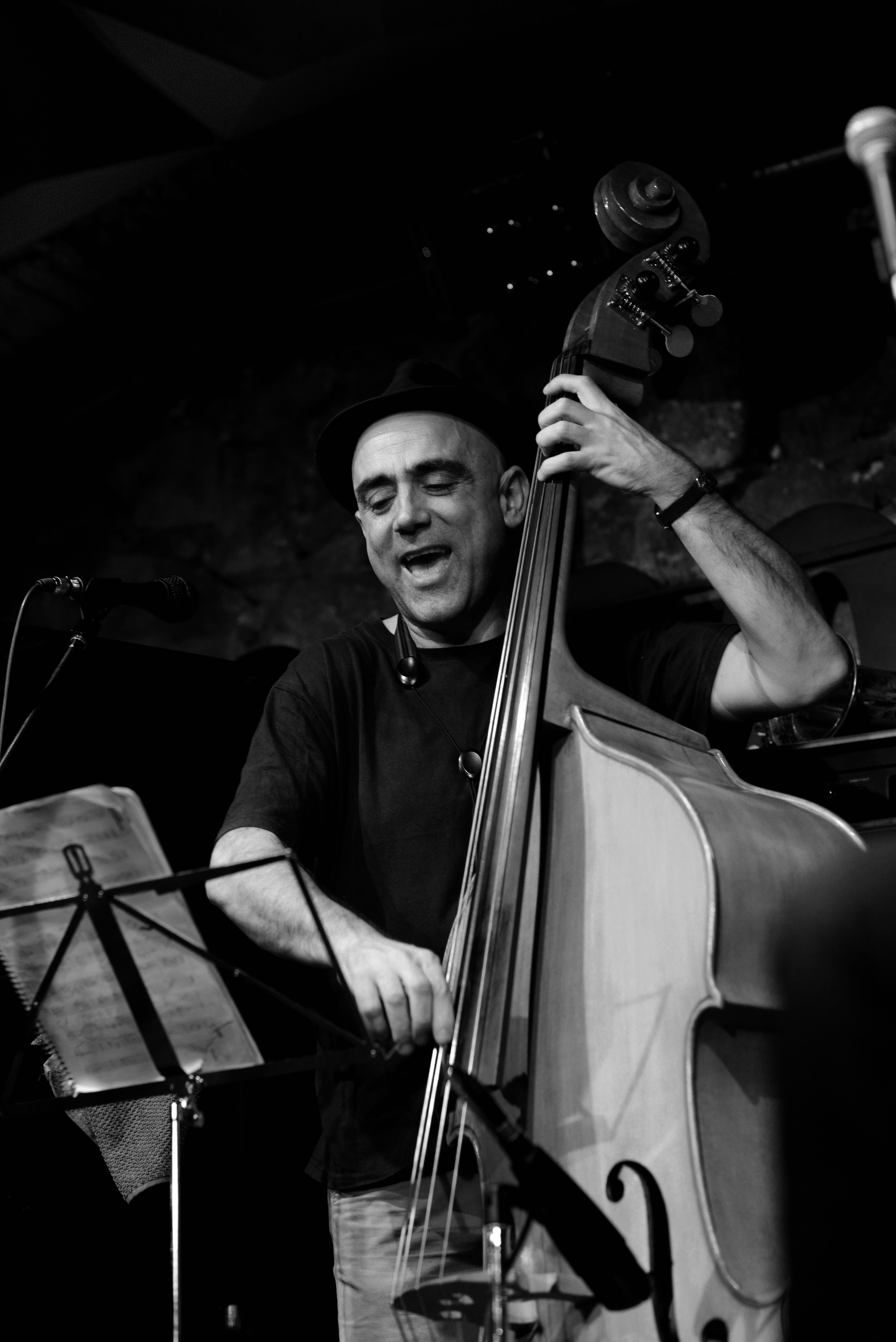
- Joan Chamorro in 2014

Background information
- Born: 1962 (age 63–64); Barcelona, Spain
- Genre: Straight-ahead jazz
- Occupation: Musician
- Instruments: Saxophone, clarinet, flute, cornet, double bass
- Years active: 1980–present
- Label: Jazz to Jazz
- Member of: Sant Andreu Jazz Band
- Website: Official site

Joan Chamorro (born in 1962) is a Spanish jazz musician and music teacher. He plays saxophone, clarinet, flute, cornet, and double bass. He is the founder and director of the Sant Andreu Jazz Band. He developed his own teaching method. In 2012, he received the Premis Altaveu award.

== Biography ==
Joan Chamorro studied saxophone at the Municipal Conservatory of Barcelona under Adolf Ventas. He also graduated the music school Taller de Músics in Barcelona.

He has played with Slide Hampton, Tete Montoliu, Frank Foster, Teddy Edwards, Frank Wess, Bebo Valdés, Randy Brecker, Gary Smulyan, Dick Oatts, Jesse Davis (saxophonist), Dennis Rowland, Carmen Lundy, John Mosca, David Allen, Bobby Shew, and Judy Niemack. He was part of the Big Band del Taller de músics, the Big Band de Bellaterra, John Dubuclet's Big Band, the Big Band Jazz Terrassa, and Eladio Reinón-Tete Montoliu's Supercombo.

In 2006, Chamorro founded the Sant Andreu Jazz Band, where he teaches young musicians (7–21-years-old). He is the producer of the Joan Chamorro Presenta collection featuring some of the members of the Sant Andreu Jazz Band, for example Andrea Motis, Alba Armengou, Eva Férnandez, Rita Payés, Magalí Datzira and Èlia Bastida. The album Joan Chamorro Presenta La Màgia De La Veu received the Enderrock Award 2015 for the best album and the album Joan Chamorro Presenta Rita Payés received the Enderrock Award 2015 for best new jazz project. In 2012, Ramón Tort made a documentary film A Film about Kids and Music that is a portrait of Joan Chamorro and his music project, the Sant Andreu Jazz Band.

Chamorro also leads the Andrea Motis & Joan Chamorro Quintet.

== Discography ==
- Baritone Rhapsody (Fresh Sound, 2011)
- Joan Chamorro presenta Andrea Motis (Temps, DiscMedi Blau)
- Joan Chamorro presenta Eva Fernández (Temps, 2013)
- Feeling Good (Whaling City Sound, 2014)
- Coses que es diuen però que no es fan (DiscMedi Blau, 2014)
- La Magic De La Veu (Jazz to Jazz, 2014)
- Live at Casa Fuster (Jazz to Jazz, 2014)
- Joan Chamorro presenta Magalí Datzira (Jazz to Jazz, 2014)
- Lua Amarela with Rita Payès (Jazz to Jazz, 2016)
- Joan Chamorro Octet Play Luigi Grasso's Arrangements (Jazz to Jazz, 2017)
- Joan Chamorro Presenta Èlia Bastida (Jazz to Jazz, 2017)
- Joan Chamorro Presenta Alba Armengou (Jazz to Jazz, 2019)
- Joan Chamorro Presenta Joana Casanova (Jazz to Jazz, 2020)
- Èlia Bastida meet Scott Hamilton & Joan Chamorro Trio (Jazz to Jazz, 2022)
- Live: MotisChamorro Big Band (Jazz to Jazz, 2015)
- Joan Chamorro Presenta's Big-Band (2022)
