= Trijntje Oosterhuis discography =

This is the discography for Dutch jazz pop musician Trijntje Oosterhuis.

== Albums ==
Title	Album details	Peak chart positions	Certifications
Title	Album details	NL	Certifications
With Total Touch
Total Touch	Released: 13 January 1997; Label: BMG Nederland BV; Format: Digital download, CD	2	NVPI: 4× Platinum
This Way	Released: 1 June 1998; Label: BMG Nederland BV; Format: Digital download, CD	1	NVPI: 2× Platinum
The Best of Total Touch & Trijntje Oosterhuis	Released: 2003; Label: Sony BMG; Format: Digital download, CD	13	
As a solo artist
For Once in My Life	Released: 1999; Label: Blue Note; Format: Digital download, CD	25	NVPI: Gold
Trijntje Oosterhuis	Released: 2003; Label: Blue Note; Format: Digital download, CD	3	NVPI: Gold
Strange Fruit	Released: 12 January 2004; Label: Blue Note; Format: Digital download, CD	2	NVPI: 2× Platinum
See You as I Do	Released: 9 October 2005; Label: EMI; Format: Digital download, CD	5	NVPI: Gold
The Look of Love: Burt Bacharach Songbook	Released: 20 November 2006; Label: Blue Note; Format: Digital download, CD	1	NVPI: 2× Platinum
Who'll Speak for Love: Burt Bacharach Songbook II	Released: 8 December 2007; Label: EMI; Format: Digital download, CD	2	NVPI: 2× Platinum
Never Can Say Goodbye	Released: 4 December 2009; Label: EMI; Format: Digital download, CD	2	NVPI: Gold
This Is the Season	Released: 19 November 2010; Label: EMI; Format: Digital download, CD	2	NVPI: Platinum
Sundays in New York	Released: 11 March 2011; Label: EMI; Format: Digital download, CD	22	
We've Only Just Begun	Released: 2011; Label: EMI; Format: Digital download, CD	19	
Wrecks We Adore	Released: 12 April 2012; Label: EMI; Format: Digital download, CD	1	NVPI: Platinum
Walk Along	Released: 15 May 2015; Label: Warner Music Benelux; Format: Digital download, CD	6	NVPI: Gold
Leven van de liefde	Released: 15 September 2017; Label: Warner Music Benelux; Format: Digital download, CD	7	
Mensen veel geluk – Liedjes van haar vader Huub Oosterhuis	Released: 9 November 2018; Label: Train-Cha, Warner Music Benelux; Format: Digital download, CD	11	
Dit is voor mij	Released: 7 June 2019; Label: Warner Music Benelux; Format: Digital download, CD	6	

== Compilations ==
Title	Album details	Peak chart positions	Certifications
Title	Album details	NL	Certifications
Best of Burt Bacharach Live	Released: 2009; Label: Blue Note; Format: DVD-video and CD	52	
Collected	Released: 24 April 2015; Label: Universal Music; Format: Digital download, CD	21	
Christmas Evening with Trijntje Live	Released: 8 December 2017; Label: Warner Music Benelux; Format: Digital download, CD	53	

== Singles ==
Title	Year	Peak chart positions	Album
Title	Year	NL	Album
With Total Touch
"Touch Me There"	1996	13	Total Touch
"Doo Be La Dee"	1998	—	Total Touch
"I'll Say Goodbye"	1998	5	This Way
"Love Me in Slow Motion"	1998	24	This Way
"Forgive - Won't Forget"	1999	70	This Way
As a solo artist
"Wereld zonder jou" (with Marco Borsato)	1996	3	—N/a
"Vlieg met me mee (het avontuur)" (Main theme for The Flying Liftboy)	1998	16	—N/a
"Free"	2003	42	—N/a
"Nu dat jij er bent" (Carel Kraayenhof, Trijntje Oosterhuis and Janine Jansen)	2003	4	—N/a
"Merry Christmas Baby" (featuring Candy Dulfer)	2004	4	—N/a
"See You as I Do"	2005	40	See You as I Do
"Where Is the Love?" (with Raul Midón)	2006	57	See You as I Do
"Do You Know the Way to San Jose" (with Metropole Orchestra)	2006	38	The Look of Love
"That's What Friends Are For" (with Metropole Orchestra)	2007	90	The Look of Love
"Face in the Crowd" (with Lionel Richie)	2008	3	—N/a
"Everything Has Changed (Imaani's Song)" (featuring The Clayton-Hamilton Jazz Orchestra)	2011	—	Sundays in New York
"Sundays in New York" (featuring The Clayton-Hamilton Jazz Orchestra)	2011	—	Sundays in New York
"Knocked Out"	2012	15	Wrecks We Adore
"I'll Carry You"	2014	—	—N/a
"Walk Along"	2014	7	Walk Along
"Ken je mij" (with Yosina Rumajauw)	2018	17	—N/a
"—" denotes a single that did not chart or was not released.
