= 7 (Jett Rebel album) =

Studio album by Jett Rebel
- Released: 28 September 2018
- Recorded: 2017
- Studio: Gold Fold Studios
- Genre: Pop
- Length: 41
- Label: Baby Tiger Records / Sony Music Entertainment
- Producer: Jett Rebel

Jett Rebel chronology
Super Pop (2017)	7 (2018)	Yeah Yeah Yeah No (2019)

7 is the seventh studio album by Dutch singer and multi-instrumentalist Jett Rebel and was released on September 28, 2018.

== Singles ==
Singles were released, before the album came out. The first single Amy was released on March 9, 2018 along with a music video. It was the first music video made and directed by Rebel himself. On the release day, Rebel and his band played live on Dutch NPO Radio 2 Gerard Ekdom's radio show with his single Amy. The dj's of NPO Radio 2 awarded Amy the TopSong of the week immediately after this performance. The single was well received in the domestic as well as foreign press. The Belgian music site "Dansende Beren" in a review: "Jett Rebel plays a catchy pop song that is the result of a minimalist line-up. However, he makes that minimalism shine, adds his voice to it and you have the recipe for success.

On June 8, 2018, Jett Rebel released his second single Good Boy. Two days later, a music video followed. NPO Radio 2 named Good Boy to 5 star track on June 18, 2018 and NPO 3FM makes Good Boy the new 3FM Megahit on June 22, 2018. Two Good Boy remixes followed on July 13, 2018. These remixes were provided by Emiel van den Dungen and Ferry Strange. Van den Dungen is a cousin of Rebel and rumor has it that Strange is a pseudonym of Rebel himself.

The last single of the album was Perfect Lady, which was released on September 7, 2018. On this day the album cover was also shown to the public on which a naked Rebel can be seen on a pink satin sheet. The accompanying music video was released on September 26, 2018.

== Recording ==
The album was recorded in Rebel's own analogue studio: Gold Foil Studio, Nunspeet. The title of the album was chosen because this was Rebel's seventh album. This record contents excessive usage of a LinnDrum (LM-2) electronic drum-computer on every song and was recorded on a Studer A80. All instruments and all vocals were provided by Rebel himself, except for the acoustic drums by Willem van der Krabben and the additional synthesizer programming on Diva by Jasper Slijderink.

== Track listing ==
All songs written by Jett Rebel

1. "Amy" – 3:24
2. "(Again) Girl" – 4:28
3. "Can't Let Me Down" – 5:02
4. "Good Boy" – 3:30
5. "Perfect Lady" – 3:19
6. "Diva" – 4:15
7. "Stick Together – 2:34
8. "Unconditional Love" 3:49
9. "Baby I Need You" – 5:08
10. "Never Gonna Be The Same" – 5:37

== Personnel ==
The album is written, composed, arranged and produced by Jett Rebel. The album was mixed by Ronald Prent and Jett Rebel with mix-assistant Felix Tournier at Wisseloord Studios. Audio engineering by Jett Rebel. Darcy Proper did the mastering at the Wisseloord Studios.

The album has been released on compact disc and LP. The LP was released in 7 different colors vinyl, by Music On Vinyl.

The artwork concept is by Jett Rebel and Kay Nambiar. Photography cover art is by Kay Nambiar, assisted by Jorin Koers. The inspiration for the cover came from the untitled debut album of Roxy Music told Jett Rebel: One of my sources of inspiration was the cover of the first album of Roxy Music: a woman lying on a white sheet. An album cover by the American band Fotomaker, with a young girl, was also an example. I wanted to make a cover with an iconic image that you can recognise even with your eyes closed." The logo of the album was designed by Jorgos Karidas. The artwork design is by Hendry Handsome.

7 was released by Baby Tiger Records, his own record label, a division of JJ Music V.o.F. It was exclusively licensed to Sony Music Entertainment Nederland B.V.

== Instruments ==
Jett Rebel played various instruments on the album 7:

- Roland Jupiter 4 Compuphonic, Jupiter 8 and various other Roland keyboards.Yamamha Cp70 and various other Yamaha keyboards.
- Several upright piano's, a Wurlitzer and a Fender Rhodes
- Korg MS10 an MS20
- Moog Bass and Prophet 6
- Gibson, Fender, Martin Guitars
- A 12 string acoustic guitar and a sitarguitar
- A Fender Jazz Bass and an occasional Musicman Stringray
- Vibraphone, Xylophone, Blues-Harp, Melodica, Woodblock and Sleighbells.

== Reception ==
7 was well received by critics. Lennart Koster in review for Nieuweplaat felt "About 7 we can be brief: Jett Rebel did it. A banger of a record, with which he both returns to the music he made years ago, and manages to surprise. With 7 the singer shows us what he has to offer, and that's a lot. The whole package is exactly what the album was supposed to be', Tuinstra said in an interview with the ANP and it has indeed become a total package".

The editors of Timpaan Muziek gave rebel an 8.7 as a rating and felt about 7: "With Amy and (Again) Girl Rebel has a great opening of this record. Funky, rousing rhythms and supple melodies are also reminiscent of Stevie Wonder at times of Songs in the Key of Life. And before you know it you have a record full of references to musical heroes, but one that has nothing of its own. Jett Rebel knows how to avoid that pitfall. He makes a record that is unmistakably his own. The temptation is great to give Jett Rebel a 7, but that would do the record an injustice. 7 is a wonderful, world-class album."

The album was in the Dutch Album Top 100 for three weeks, foreign listings are unknown.
