= Yeah Yeah Yeah No =

EP by Jett Rebel
- Released: 18 January 2019
- Recorded: 2018
- Studio: Wisseloord Studios
- Genre: Pop, rock
- Length: 16 min 52 sec
- Label: Baby Tiger Records
- Producer: Jett Rebel

Jett Rebel chronology
7 (2018)	Yeah Yeah Yeah No (2019)	Live Forever (2019)

¥eah ¥eah ¥eah No is the third official EP by multi-instrumentalist and Dutch singer Jett Rebel. The EP was released on 18 January 2019 without any announcement. The first and only single of this EP was launched on 7 June 2019, Waiting For The Weekend. This coincided with Rebel's first encounter in England. On 11 June 2019 Rebel put on his first show in Notting Hill Arts Club in London.

== Recording ==
¥eah ¥eah ¥eah No was recorded live at the Wisseloord Studios. For the second time Rebel went into the studio with the power trio Jett Rebel 3, this time with drummer Willem van der Krabben and bassist Xander Vrienten. This is also the 2nd time Rebel chooses not to do everything on his own, just like in 2016 when recording the album Don't Die On Me Now. "Everything you hear on the record sounds exactly as it should be, Rebel says to music news from the UK".

For this EP there are 3 extra tracks played live but in the end they didn't make it to the EP. Tracks: Lady On The Hill, Bleed Me An Ocean and Slowdancer. These tracks are regularly played live during performances at festivals or a tour. Something he does more often during his live shows, performing unreleased work.

== Track listening ==
All songs written by Jett Rebel

1. "Waiting For The Weekend" - 1:58
2. "Take Me" - 3:23
3. "Dancing Through The Room" - 3:34
4. "Do You Want Me" - 3:29
5. "I See You" - 4:25

== Personnel ==
The EP is written, composed, arranged and produced by Jett Rebel. Audio engineering by Felix Tournier. Mixing by Peter Kriek. Darcy Proper did the mastering in the Wisseloord Studios.

=== Recorded live ===
- Jett Rebel - Lead vocals, guitar
- Xander Vrienten - Bass guitar
- Willem van der Krabben - drums

The EP ¥eah ¥eah ¥eah No is only available digitally.

=== Artwork ===
The artwork concept is by Jett Rebel, the picture on the cover was photographed by Jens van der Velde: "Jett Rebel artistically challenged me to ask more gray than black in this picture for his latest EP ¥eah ¥eah ¥eah No. Fortunately, the picture was taken in daylight. One take, not a post-production, just like he recorded his tracks".

¥eah ¥eah ¥eah No has been released on record label Baby Tiger Records, his own label.

== Reception ==
The English media has paid particular attention to the ¥eah ¥eah ¥eah No EP. The reviews were positive. RT Lee in review for Subba-Cultcha: With ‘Waiting for the Weekend’ Jett Rebel is serving up a perfect slice of 50s rock ‘n’ roll infused punk-pop. It's big, it's sexy and it's glamorous. A guaranteed, solid-gold earworm of a single, ‘Waiting for the Weekend’ shouts open road, top down, summer-time fun – play & repeat. Jett Rebel lives, eats and breathes music, having played 250 festivals and 7 sold-out club tours so far.
