= Ilja Reijngoud =

Dutch jazz trombonist, composer, and educator

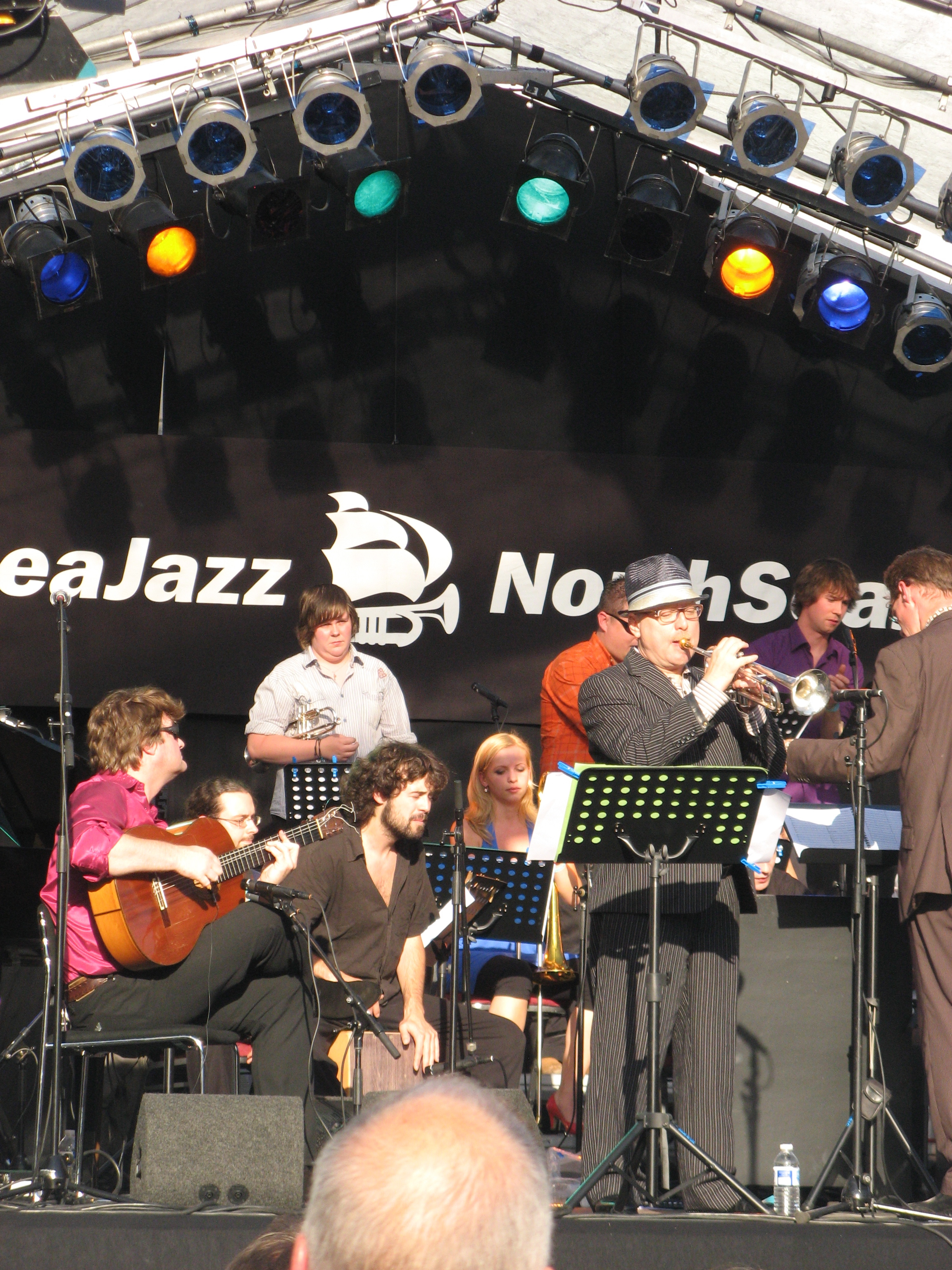
- Ilja Reijngoud (far right) conducting the Codarts Big Band at the North Sea Jazz Festival, July 2008
- Born: 5 July 1972 (age 53); Leiden, The Netherlands
- Occupations: Trombonist, composer, arranger and educator

Ilja Reijngoud (born 5 July 1972) is a Dutch jazz trombonist, composer, arranger and educator who has played with many renowned artists. He won the Thelonious Monk Award in 2003.

== Biography ==
Ilja Reijngoud was born in Leiden in the Netherlands in 1972. He studied at the Hilversum Conservatory, graduating cum laude in 1996, and continued to teach trombone at the conservatory after graduating. In 1998 he founded the jazz trombone department at the Rotterdam Conservatory (Codarts) with his former teacher Bart van Lier. He conducts the Codarts Big Band, including an annual performance at the North Sea Jazz Festival with various international guests. He is also the main trombone teacher at the Utrechts Conservatorium and guest teacher at the Royal Conservatory of The Hague. He has taught clinics and workshops in Europe and the United States.

== Discography ==
Recordings as a leader:

2007	Maxanter Records	Untamed World (feat. Bart van Lier, Jörgen van Rijen, Martijn van Iterson and Rob van Bavel) (CD, Album)
2009	Aliud Recordings	The Shakespeare Album (feat. Fay Claassen) (winner of the Edison Award 2009) (CD, Album)
2012	Challenge Records	Around The World (feat. Elizabeth Simonian) (CD, Album)

Recordings as a performer include:

1996	Kokopelli Records	Portrait Of A Silk Thread - Newly Discovered Works Of Billy Strayhorn (CD, Album)
2001	Challenge Records	Tiffany and 2, Dutch Jazz Orchestra, The - So This Is Love - More Newly Discovered Works Of Billy Strayhorn (CD, Album)
2008	Challenge Records	Moon Dreams - Rediscovered Music Of Gil Evans & Gerry Mulligan (CD, Album)
2009	TomLaLa Records	Big Time (CD, Album)

As a writer or arranger:

2004	EMI Music (Netherlands), Blue Note	The Man I Love, Trijntje Oosterhuis Live With Amsterdam Sinfonietta And Houdini's, Strange Fruit (album) (CD, Album)
2005	Social Beats	No Nonsense, Jazzinvaders - Go Ahead! (12")
2007	Et'cetera, Et'cetera, Et'cetera, Et'cetera	Where Do You Want To Go Today? New Trombone Collective (3xCD, Album, Box)
2009	TomLaLa Records	True Sparrow, Tom Beek - Big Time (CD, Album)
