= Last Words (Ten Sharp song) =

- 7" single

Single by Ten Sharp
- A-side: "Last Words"
- B-side: "White Gold"
- Released: January 1986
- Recorded: Studio Spitsbergen, Zuidbroek and Wisseloord Studios, Hilversum, the Netherlands, November 1985
- Length: 4:19 (7"); 7:59 (12")
- Label: Epic
- Songwriter(s): Ten Sharp
- Producer(s): Michiel Hoogenboezem

Ten Sharp singles chronology
"Japanese Lovesong" (1985)	"Last Words" (1986)	"Way of the West" (1987)

Music video
- "Last Words" (official video) on YouTube

"Last Words" is the third single from the Dutch group Ten Sharp, released in January 1986. The song was written by the band and produced by Michiel Hoogenboezem. The single made it into the Dutch top 40 Tip-charts. In March 1986, they shot a video for the song in De Posthoorn church in Amsterdam.

The B-side "White Gold" is a heavy slow song about the hunt on elephants in Africa. An edited version appeared on the "You" maxi-single.

== Track listings ==
7" single

1. "Last Words" - 4:19
2. "White Gold" - 3:41

12" maxi

1. "Last Words" (Extended Re-Mix) - 7:59
2. "White Gold" - 3:41

== Personnel ==
Musicians

- Vocals: Marcel Kapteijn
- Keyboards: Niels Hermes
- Guitars: Martin Boers
- Bass: Ton Groen
- Drums: Wil Bouwes

Credits

- Produced by Michiel Hoogenboezem
- Engineered by Ronald Prent and Michiel Hoogenboezem
- Design: MaCo Productions
