= Jett Rebel =

Dutch musician

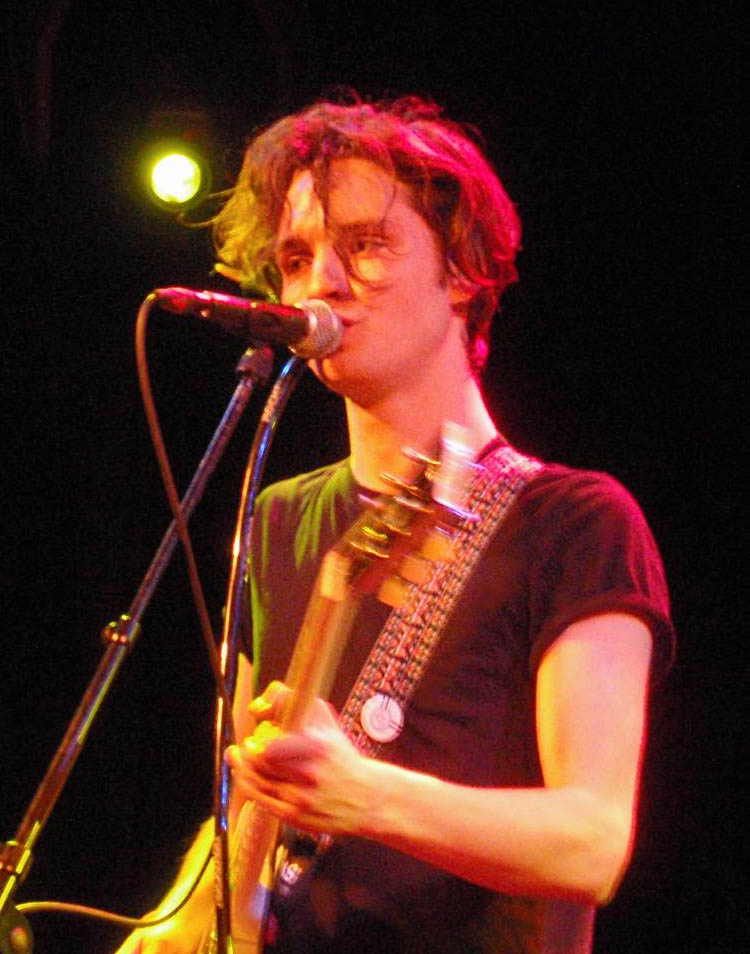
- Jett Rebel
- Born: Jelte van den Dungen; January 24, 1991 (age 35); The Hague, Netherlands
- Occupations: Recording artist; producer; singer; songwriter; composer; multi-instrumentalist
- Years active: 2012–present
- Musical career
- Genres: Pop; rock
- Instruments: Vocals; piano; guitar; bass guitar; synthesizer; drums
- Label: Baby Tiger Records
- Website: jettrebel.nl

Jelte van den Dungen (born January 24, 1991, in The Hague), known professionally as Jett Rebel, is a Dutch singer-songwriter, composer, multi-instrumentalist, music producer and recording artist. The moniker Jett Rebel refers to a solo artist who performs live in different band formations in the Dutch music scene.

== Background ==
Rebel was born on January 24, 1991, in Den Haag. His parents played in socialist music groups and choirs (Verenigde Oost Nederlandse Kompanjie, also known as VONK) with which they also performed demonstrations against racism, nuclear energy, and weapons. At a fairly young age, Rebel moved 1993 from Den Haag to Baarn. Despite the distance, the family went to Hengelo every Sunday to rehearse. Rebel was allowed to hang out at VONK every Sunday, which was an important factor in his career as a musician. The socialist nature of VONK, including their frequent appearances at demonstrations and playing of protest songs such as The Internationale influenced his music crucially. This becomes apparent in the topics that Tuinstra frequently writes about; humanity, equality, anti-racism, gender equality, and tolerance are recurring themes of his songs. He feels that there is freedom when people express themselves in different ways and he shows this belief in his appearance, clothing, religion, and sexuality, which can be seen in his androgynous appearance. While he feels comfortable in women's clothing, wearing lipstick and nail polish, he can also appear masculine. His appearances can often be called flamboyant, especially on stage. Rebel regularly changes his looks and goes through many phases to express himself.

== Early years ==
Rebel grew up in a musical artist family in Baarn. From an early age he showed a strong interest in music. He started recording music at a very young age, 4/5 years, using a cassette recorder and a toy cassette player (a technique called Ping-pong recording). He started by first making songs and later made complete albums. Before the age of 10, Rebel played various instruments: drums (5 years), piano (6 years), guitar (8–9 years), and bass guitar (9–10 years). After his 10th birthday, developed an interest in all kinds of synthesizers and other string-wind instruments. Tuinstra has always enjoyed learning to play as many instruments as possible as a hobby. He also had a talent for singing. In his childhood, he sang in the youth choir of Majel Lustenhouwer on recordings by Rob de Nijs and Jochem van Gelder among others. In 2003, he participated with his first band, The Edge, in the preliminaries of the first Dutch Junior Song Festival. While he was attending the Baarnsch Lyceum, a secondary school, he stood out by winning the 'Grandi Art', a school competition for music, as a pop musician for consecutive years. In this period, he played in the locally known bands Bitter Lemon, Fubroz, Metro Mortale, and The Zoo. Rebel explored many different musical genres, from funk to progressive rock, from jazz to medieval choral music. In this period, he had already recorded more than 5 solo records without publishing anything. The first solo album he made was Red Coat from 2009. Red Coat was a concept album about a teenage love in which the foundation for the Jett Rebel sound can already be heard. He played more than 15 instruments on the record when he was only 17/18 years old. Together with Willem Wits and Marnix Dorrestein, he recorded the debut album of Metro Mortale in the parental home of Dorrestein, which was released on May 29, 2010, at bandcamp. Short videos were made of these recordings as in a 'real life soap' in different episodes illustrating how the album was created. In 2009, Tuinstra moved to Amsterdam to study piano and guitar at the Conservatorium van Amsterdam. In that period, he joined the pop groups The Souldiers and Valerius. After about a year at the conservatorium, he quit because of repetitive strain injury from playing too much guitar and because in the end it didn't meet his expectations. On July 16, 2012, Jelte van den Dungen released a single, Beautiful, under his own name via bandcamp. The next day the EP Sundown followed with three tracks (Sundown, The Real Deal and Deeply in Love With You). The track Sundown could later be found on Rebel's fourth album Truck. The album Red Coat was later released at bandcamp April 5, 2013, and removed in the summer of 2018 for unknown reasons. In September 2012 Tuinstra decided to make his own music under the stage name Jett Rebel.

== Career in highlights ==
=== 2013/2014 ===
The first EP Venus appeared on May 26, 2013, followed by the EP Mars on January 15, 2014. In the EP, Jett Rebel shows his versatility; he played all the instruments and vocals of the EPs himself. The artwork of the EPs is designed (painted) by his father, Steven G.Tuinstra. The three singles of these EP's were enthusiastically received and played by NPO 3FM and other radio stations. He performed live in television programmes Toppop3, De Wereld Draait Door and Serious Request, in the supporting program of the B-52's and was proclaimed by radio station Radio 3FM as 3FM Serious Talent. On April 19, 2014, the EP's were merged for one album called Venus & Mars. On April 11, 2014, the 4th and last single of the album Venus & Mars was released. In the spring of 2014 Jett Rebel launched his first sold out "Venus & Mars-tour" in a series of small and medium-sized venues in the Netherlands. Jett Rebel played over 60 festivals in 2014, including Pinkpop and Lowlands. At Pinkpop he had the honor to play with bassist Larry Graham (known from Sly & the Family Stone and from Graham Central Station). The official debut album Hits for Kids was released on October 30, 2014. He worked with London-based producer/mixer Tony Platt, who previously worked with artists such as Cheap Trick, Motörhead and Foreigner. Hits For Kids is the last record Rebel recorded with digital equipment. In the autumn followed a 2nd sold-out tour Tour d'Amour in 18 large venues in the Netherlands and ended the tour on December 30, 2014, in Paradiso Amsterdam.

=== 2015 ===
On February 21, he sold out the AFAS Live. Jett Rebel started his three-hour show ten meters above the stage of AFAS Live and slowly lowered himself with his guitar on stage. Several guest artists were invited during this show. On April 9, 2015, he won the Best Live Act at the 3FM Awards. On Liberation Day May 5 Jett Rebel was appointed as one of the ambassadors of freedom. On that day Jett Rebel and his band were taken by helicopter to five liberation festivals: Groningen, Leeuwarden, Amsterdam, The Hague and Haarlem. On July 2, 2015, Rebel was invited by Larry Graham to perform in London and share the stage with him and Mark King of Level 42. A few days later Graham gave an exclusive show in Patronaat (Haarlem) and announced that Candy Dulfer and Jett Rebel would share the stage with him. After having already performed on a number of major stages, Rebel performed at the North Sea Jazz Festival in the Nile on July 14, 2015. The critics praised his performance with his then 7-headed band. Rebel had fallen off the stage during this performance: I tried to enjoy myself intensely, so I closed my eyes for a moment during the guitar solo. But then things went wrong. And then I just stepped right off the stage. Rebel had severe bruising on his ribs. That same evening he came to the rescue of colleague Chaka Khan. Khan had to leave the stage because of voice problems. Her backing band and Khan's background vocalists decided to continue the set. Rebel played the song Tell Me Something Good . In June, the first Live double album was released Tight Like A Baby Tiger (Live at the Paradiso) on his own new Record Label Baby Tiger Records. The album was recorded live at Paradiso on December 30, 2014. In October was the first sold-out solo theatre tour, An Evening with Jett Rebel, in six major venues in the Netherlands including the Royal Concertgebouw in Amsterdam. More than a month later, Rebel left on November 16, 2015, for a ten-day tour in New York City, during an annual Live in Your living Room festival. He played there for the first time with a three-man formation. On December 30, 2015, Rebel organized his own festival for the first time, Rebelfest. At Rebelfest five Dutch acts got the chance to present themselves. Artists who performed were Marnix Dorrestein as IX, Bells Of Youth, Amber Gomaa, Echo Movis and Willem Wits. Rebel himself also gave a three-hour performance.

=== 2016 ===
The double album Truck was released on January 22, 2016. Truck was fully recorded on a Tascam Porta 4 track cassette recorder. Truck was the first part in a triptych; Rebel released three albums within a year. On August 26, 2016, Don't Die On Me Now was released and on January 13, 2017, Super Pop followed. The three albums are independent of each other, but are connected to a triptych: the Experimentalist, the Musician and the Composer. The release of Rebel's fifth studio album was at Lowlands on August 20, 2016. The Lowlands program booklet contained the mysterious sentence 'Don't Die on me Now'. Festival visitors had no idea what was in store for them at the time. The mysterious act turned out to be the title of Jett Rebel's new album, which he came to play in its entirety on Lowlands. The official release date was only one week later, on August 26, 2016. In the same week, it was announced that Rebel would play his biggest show ever in Rotterdam Ahoy on February 4, 2017. At the end of August, the 5th tour followed with the power trio Jett Rebel 3 Live in Concert. Rebel played 5 nights in a row in five small intimate clubs; the tour sold out in 24 hours. In this intimate setting, Rebel wanted to get back to the essence of pure rock 'n roll. In addition to this tour, Rebel visited several record stores that same week to promote his album. On September 3, Rebel was in the Mega Top 50 with Lucky Boy for the first time and entered the list on No. 34, the album entered the Vinyl50 Chart on No. 1. In November, he was in the line-up of MTV Netherlands music week, for a special event to present his label Baby Tiger Records to the general public in Rotown Rotterdam. On December 2, 2016, Rebel released a new single, All The Way, which was the final piece of the then not yet released last triptych Super Pop, which was released together with a lyric video.

=== 2017 ===
The launch of Super Pop was at midnight on January 13, 2017, during Eurosonic Noorderslag. The release party was in the record store Plato in Groningen. During Eurosonic Noorderslag a special pop-up museum was set up in the Der Aa church in Groningen about Jett Rebel, this coincided with the release of Super Pop. At the launch of his album, Jett Rebel gave a solo performance in the Der Aa church and also performed at the Noorderslag event. On February 4, 2017, Rebel played a three-and-a-half-hour show in Rotterdam Ahoy. This was followed by his 6th sold-out Super Pop tour in 5 major cities across the Netherlands on April 13, 2017. During this tour Rebel won the brand new 3FM Award for Best Social; for the artist who has had the most impact with their social channels. Immediately after the tour Rebel announced that due to its success the Super Pop Tour would be in reprise in the autumn with 11 new clubshows. On April 22, 2017, Rebel was the Dutch ambassador of Record Store Day. On this day a 7" by Jett Rebel was released, a double A-side on pink vinyl with the singles "Better Off Together" and "Daydreamin'" from the album Super Pop. This single was available for free and exclusively to the first 5,000 visitors of Record Store Day, in almost 100 independent record stores in the Netherlands. On September 7 Rebel won the ELLE style award. After the reprise Super Pop tour, he left for a tour through Germany and Spain. On November 10, 2017, Rebel made the title song for the film Old Love by director Nicole van Kilsdonk. Especially for the film he made a remake of the song 'Send Me A Postcard', of which the original was written by Robbie van Leeuwen for the Dutch band Shocking Blue. With deep respect for the original, Jett Rebel has created a new version especially for the film. With countless twists in melody, harmony, rhythm and new parts, Jett Rebel delivers his own sound in a contemporary remake, making an important contribution at the end of Oude Liefde. It's certainly worthwhile after the last shot of the film to sit back in your cinema chair and listen to the result.

=== 2018 ===
In 2018, Paradiso celebrated its 50th anniversary; the kick-off of the party year took place on January 1, 2018, with a sold-out concert by Jett Rebel which lasted 4.5 hours. Rebel invited several guest artists during the concert. On January 13, 2018, Rebel was on the specially organized Murakami weekend on cruise ship SS Rotterdam. The weekend was entirely dedicated to the Japanese writer Haruki Murakami. It is the largest book presentation ever organized in the Netherlands for a foreign writer. Rebel himself, a big fan of Murakami's books, gave a solo performance behind the grand piano. Even before the album 7 was released, the singles Amy, Good Boy and Perfect Lady were released. For the 2nd time Rebel performed at the North Sea Jazz Festival in the Nile, on July 14, 2019. In the summer period he was booked at several german festivals. On September 19 Rebel attended the largest clubfestival in Germany, the Reeperbahn festival. On September 28, the 7th album 7 was released. On the album the LinnDrum (LM-2) played a prominent role and it was recorded on a Studer A80. On November 1, 2019, he gave a performance in the Posthoornkerk, this was exclusively organized by NPO 3FM. The Posthoornkerk in Amsterdam was transformed into a gigantic bedroom, where listeners could win special tickets. On November 17, 2018, Rebel announced a new tour at RTL Late Night; the Unconditional Love tour in 7 theatres. At the invitation of politician Frans Timmermans, Rebel was asked on December 8 to perform in Lisbon for the European socialists and social democrats, where Timmermans was appointed as Spitzenkandidat for the position of the President of the European Commission. Rebel played with a trio formation his track Stick Together from album 7, an appropriate message for the EU, the member states and the social democracy. Stick Together refers to Country Joe and the Fish, an American band that was mainly known for protest songs against the Vietnam War. Rebel often leaves a political mark in his music and tries to use his voice to get a positive message across. In his lyrics, there is a sharp distinction between the lighter lyrics and the heavier, poetic, narrative lyrics. In Blonde Like You from the album Don't Die On Me Now, he sings directly to Donald Trump in which he wraps up a serious matter in a light-hearted way; I wouldn't be with a blonde like you, I'd kick you out before you knew. The lyrics draw a parallel between romantic biases and Trump's desire to keep immigrants out of the US. Other examples can be found in lyrics such as Do You Feel Alright, a track from the Truck album. Rebel talks about anti-nationalism and weapon rights: we have known for years how to get past our fears, drop you guns. Everybody in control smash down the border patrol, come on in, everybody has a right to win, your skin doesn't make you sin, don't you know by now? Children are starting to see, people only wanna be free, don't you feel alright, racism starting to fall, we don't see a difference at all, don't you feel alright?

=== 2019 ===
On January 18, 2019, Rebel released his third EP Yeah Yeah Yeah No. The EP was played live and recorded in the Wisseloord Studios with bassist Xander Vrienten and drummer Willem van der Krabben. This is the second time Rebel has collaborated with other artists. On the same day, he played for the fifth time at Eurosonic Noorderslag in a three-man formation. He played his new EP and added two new unreleased tracks to his setlist: Lady On The Hill & Bleed Me An Ocean. In February, he performed his Unconditional Love theatre solo tour in a sold out Royal Theater Carré. In April, he was at Paaspop for the 5th time and was allowed to start the mainstage. He made a big impression with his performance, especially with his appearance in a velvet red dress. In mid-March it was announced, during the annual Pinkpop press presentation in Paradiso, that Jett Rebel was headliner at Pinkpop on June 10, 2019. Pinkpop celebrated its 50th anniversary. One day later, Rebel flew with his trio formation to the UK for a one-time performance, his first show in London in the Notting Hill Arts Club. One single of the EP was launched on June 7, 2019, Waiting for the Weekend. The show could be watched via a live stream and was received enthusiastically by english fans. Rebel returned to London on September 30, 2019, for a number of performances. In March/April he produced the album of Dutch singer Trijntje Oosterhuis: Dit is voor mij. This was the first time he took on a big production. On the record he played a lot of instruments himself. The album was released on July 7, 2019. Oosterhuis was very enthusiastic about the collaboration; "Jelte is curious, empathetic and authentic in his choices and he has left me in my dignity and challenged me to look at it sometimes differently than I would have done myself". On October 11 Rebel could be seen for the first time during a performance in the German television program Rockpalast. Jett Rebel announced on November 28 at Dutch television De Wereld Draait Door his new livealbum Live Forever The release was November 29, 2019.

=== 2020 ===
On July 9, 2019, it was announced that Rebel will start his third solo tour on March 23, 2020, in Royal Theater Carré. In March, the government announced worldwide that the COVID-19 pandemic had halted all events until further notice. On April 20, Daryl Hall announces to Ultimate Classic Rock that he is working with Jett Rebel on a new Hall & Oates album. On May 6, Rebel's management team confirmed that he will producing the new Hall & Oates album.

== Documentaries ==
In 2014, two documentaries about Jett Rebel were released. The first documentary was Ready For Takeoff, directed by Harm Rieske, who graduated from the Dutch Film Academy with this short film. Riekse and his fellow filmmakers followed Jett Rebel for a short period (September/October 2013). The 24-minute documentary follows the period just before Jett Rebel wins several major music awards and gets a drastically different life. Rieske explains how the documentary came about: "I thought it would be very cool to make a documentary about the sound of a guitar. I came into contact with luthier Sjak Zwier. Then I also heard about Jett Rebel. He hadn't released a record at the time I met him and was still relatively unknown. Because I wanted to have both Jett Rebel and Sjak Zwier in my documentary, it was exciting when the crew started filming them together for the first time; they didn't know what the click would be. Tuinstra visited Zwier for a guitar and fortunately the chemistry between the two eccentric figures was perfect". The premiere of the documentary was on July 1, 2014, in the Oude Luxor Theater. The documentary was made in collaboration with the AVROTROS and could later be seen on NPO Start or YouTube.

The documentary that followed Ready for Takeoff was Who The Fuck Is Jett Rebel? made by documentary filmmaker Linda Hakeboom. In Who The Fuck Is Jett Rebel?, Hakeboom shows how Tuinstra turned into Jett Rebel and what it does to someone to become famous in so quickly. The documentary premiered at the International Documentary Film Festival Amsterdam on November 23, 2014; "The viewer is not only an eyewitness to Rebel's growing success, but also sees how he struggles with his insecurity." The documentary raised many questions and received both positive and negative reactions. The record company and Rebel's own situation were critically examined. Rebel's reaction in that period: "I gave Linda all the freedom she needed. You then make yourself vulnerable. People then start to form an image. That doesn't always work out well. Some people think that I am a transvestite and that I am mainly concerned with lipstick and nail polish. Others find me arrogant. Yes, that image touches me. You know, I try to be myself. Sincerity above all else. When you get this over you... It is also a wise lesson. I'm not going to get excited about imaging anymore. Those things arise outside of me. I choose my own path, regardless of what others think of it."

== Baby Tiger Records ==
Mid-June 2015, Jett Rebel started his own record label Baby Tiger Records. The live album Tight Like A Baby Tiger (Live At The Paradiso) was the first album he releases on his own label, under division of JJ Music V.o.F. The first 7 albums were exclusively licensed to Sony Music Entertainment Netherlands.

Amber Gomaa was the first artist on the new label, and released her solo debut EP Sun Gazing. Gomaa wrote the music herself and with the help of Jett Rebel she produced her EP, which was released on August 28, 2015.

== Collaborations ==
Band members in years

- 2013 Joost van Dijck/ guitar, Rick van Wort/ drummer, Xander Vrienten/bassist.
- 2014 Lorijn von Piekartz/ guitar, Rick van Wort/ drummer, Xander Vrienten/ bassist, Jessica Manuputty/ backing vocals & keys, Amber Gomaa/ backing vocals & keys.
- 2015 Lorijn von Piekartz/ guitar, Rick van Wort/ drummer, Xander Vrienten/ bassist, Jessica Manuputty/ backing vocals & keys, Amber Gomaa/ backing vocals & keys, Marc Alberto/ Saxophone /.
- 2016 Lorijn von Piekartz/ guitar, Kees Schaper/ drummer, Xander Vrienten/ bassist, Jessica Manuputty/ backing vocals & keys, Amber Gomaa/ backing vocals & keys/, Marc Alberto/ Saxophone, Daniel van Loenen/ Trombone/ (last half-year).
- 2017 Nick Croes / guitar, Willem van der Krabben/ drummer, Xander Vrienten/ bassist, Jessica Manuputty/ backing vocals & keys, Marc Alberto/ Saxophone/ (1st half-year), Daniel van Loenen/ Trombone/ (1st half-year).
- 2018 Nick Croes/ guitar, Willem van der Krabben/ drummen, Xander Vrienten/ bassist, Jasper Slijderink/ keys.
- 2019 Willem van der Krabben/ drummer, Xander Vrienten/ bassist (stopped January 2019), Peter Peskens/ bassist.

Albums produced by Jett Rebel

- Amber Gomaa- Sun Gazing (EP) August 28, 2015. produced by Jett Rebel and Amber Gomaa.
- Jessica Manuputty – TOMA June 1, 2017, produced by Jett Rebel and Jessica Manuputty.
- Trijntje Oosterhuis – Dit Is Voor Mij June 7, 2019, Produced by Jett Rebel.

Contributed to albums

On November 4, 2016, DeWolff released a new single and music video for the song Outta Step & Ill at Ease. Jett Rebel plays the piano and provides the backing vocals.

== Recording ==
Rebel usually works alone. He writes, composes and produces his own music. Rebel records himself, plays all instruments and sings vocals himself. He attaches great importance to analogue equipment and the use of real instruments. He used studio equipment that was mainly used before 1977. Rebel is always writing new music and spends a lot of (free) time recording music. He claims to have written about 3000 songs and to have made between 20 and 25 albums. He has been writing more than there are albums. For each record there is an average of material for three albums, which Rebel has carefully kept since he was four years old. Rebel is productive and often composes very spontaneously. He does not have a sounding board. Rebel often only plays his music when it's really finished. "I get my feedback as soon as I play the ready-made piece. If someone says the first time they listen that they love it, it gives me the confidence to go through with it. I am always very doubtful. If someone would react with: this is the worst thing I have ever heard, I would find a way to understand that. I'm never firmly convinced that what I do is right, I only know I want it that way."

Rebel regularly speaks about the contemporary modern techniques used for recording music. "You can use modern recording techniques to make everything sound the way you want it to. You can digitally polish an impure singing voice, you can add a string orchestra. You name it. The digital revolution has ruined a lot. A lot is fake. I want to make a statement by going for real and pure. In my opinion, all the music that really matters was made before 1988. What comes next is an infusion of the basics. I have so much love for the craft of making music and see this craft slowly becoming extinct."

== Influences/ inspiration ==
=== Music ===
Rebel loves music and collects mp3s and vinyl. He mainly listens to 60/70/80s music, some that is only available on vinyl. His taste in music is wide-ranging. His father inspired him to love Led Zeppelin and Deep Purple, but also Donna Summer and Stevie Wonder. Rebel doesn't listen much to contemporary music or music that was produced after he was born.

His most important musical inspiration is probably Todd Rundgren. His personally recorded music and the style in which he writes and plays as well as the work he has done for many other artists made a profound impression.

Also Brian Wilson, known as founding member of The Beach Boys, has been a hero to him. "I think that as a fan we feel that we can relate to our idol. This is definitely the case for me with Brian. I feel like I know and understand him, and in some ways we are very similar people."

Other important artists who have inspired Rebel include Joni Mitchell, Elvis Presley, Fleetwood Mac and Steve Miller.

The first record he loved was Songs in the Key of Life; he was 3-4 years old when he learned songs by Wonder on piano by ear.

The documentary Classic Albums was study material for him. His favorite songs of all time were written by Joni Mitchell. "There is no-one like her. She has written songs and records that are a complete world on their own."

When he was a young child, he was obsessed with Elvis, his childhood idol between the ages of 5 and 11. Rebel considers him to be the biggest influence on his career. Because of Elvis, Rebel knew he wanted to become a musician. Rebel has had an Elvis-style quiff throughout his primary school years. A large portrait of Elvis is tattooed on Rebel's right arm, which stands for that little boy from the past who was always bullied because he stood for something and wanted to achieve something in his life.

Another early childhood love of Rebel was Steve Miller, one of his favorite singers. As a child he stole the album Fly Like An Eagle from his parents and played it a countless times. According to Rebel, "Miller's voice is amazing and underestimated."

The last name in the line is Fleetwood Mac. As a young boy, he was initially more attracted to the bluesy Fleetwood Mac. Peter Green's style and playing, inspired him in his own playing. Later came the Lindsey Buckingham and Stevie Nicks era, in which the record Rumours made a big impact.

There were other records that also made an impression, in particular those by Bob Welch. Because, according to Rebel, "they explain why and how a blues group can turn into one of the greatest pop groups this world has ever known".

Jett Rebel frequently honours his favourite artists during his live shows. Rebel has covered over 300 artists live since 2014.

On his right arm are tattoos of his musical heroes like Elvis Presley, Todd Rundgren, Brian Wilson, Stevie Wonder, Joni Mitchell, Steve Miller Band, Fleetwood Mac, Toto, The Beatles (white album), Sly & the Family Stone, Funkadelic, The Millennium and more will follow.

=== Art ===
As a young child, Rebel was often taken to museums by his parents. He knows a lot about visual art, especially painting. Rebel has a strong admiration for Picasso, the Cubism period appeals to him the most. The different stages that Picasso goes through fascinates him and what keeps Rebel innovating, Picasso inspires Rebel to be the type of artist he wants to be. He has a big love for Renaissance painters: Sandro Botticelli, Da Vinci, Michelangelo. Rebel repeatedly visited the Uffizi in Florence, his favourite museum. Rebel used The Birth of Venus by Botticelli as inspiration for his album cover Venus & Mars. The cover was painted by his father. The Annunciation of Da Vinci was printed life-size on canvas during the Truck tour in 2016 and used as the background for his concerts. In 2019, he used another painting as the background for his shows. The audience of Eurosonic Noorderslag was able to see the life-size canvas of the rococo painter François Boucher's Resting Girl during Rebel's performance.

For the exhibition Van Gogh & Japan, an introduction video was released on March 15, 2018, in which Rebel talked about his fascination with Japan and Robbert Dijkgraaf took the viewer to the run-up of the exhibition Van Gogh & Japan, which opened from March 23, 2018, to June 24, 2018, in the Van Gogh Museum. "Everything about the country interests me; the food, the literature. My music wants to go there, let's put it this way, I always have the hope that one day I will be able to make music there for the people. What fascinates me most about the painters I love is a kind of never stopping you from developing and never stopping learning."

== Personal life ==
In June 2016, Rebel stopped drinking alcohol and doing drugs. Rebel had been struggling with severe depression for years. Doctors told Rebel that the use of drugs would eventually obstruct his musical creativity and that if he continued to use drugs. Rebel has written a song about keeping hope on his album Super Pop: "Just in Case You're Ever Down Again".

== Touring ==
Netherlands

1. Tour 2014 "Venus & Mars"
2. Tour 2014 "Tour'd Amour"
3. Tour 2015 "A Evening with Jett Rebel (solo)"
4. Tour 2016 "Best Night Of Your Life Tour"
5. Tour 2016 "Jett Rebel 3: Live In Concert"
6. Tour 2017 "Super Pop"
7. Tour 2017 "Super Pop in Reprise"
8. Tour 2018 "7 Cities 7 Shows"
9. Tour 2019 "Unconditional Love"
10. Tour 2019 "Live Forever"
11. Tour 2020 "Face To Face "

Belgium Tour 2015

- February 11, Voorruit in Gent
- February 14, Muziekdrooom in Hasselt
- February 18, Trix in Antwerpen
- February 19, Het Depot in Leuven

Germany Tour 2017

- November 19, Musikbunker in Aken (Elbe)
- November 20, Luxor in Köln
- November 21, Gleiss 22 in Münster
- November 22, Badehaus in Berlin
- November 23, Cadillac in Oldenburg
- November 24, Piano in Dortmund

Spain Tour 2017

- December 12, Rocksound in Barcelona
- December 13, Urban Rock Concept in Vitorai-Gasteiz
- December 14, BNS in Santander
- December 15, Star Bar in Tarazona De La Mancha
- December 16, Rock Palace Madrid
- December 17, Salason Cangas Do Morraza

== Television/radio ==
Jett Rebel is a guest on Dutch television programs such as, De Wereld Draait Door, RTL Late Night, Talkshow Pauw, and several radio programs; NPO Radio 2, NPO 3FM, Radio Veronica.

Television programmes/concert registrations:

- Toppop3/ 2013
- De Wereld Draait Door/2014/ 2015/ 2016/ 2017/ 2018/ 2019
- 3FM Awards/ 2014/ 2015/ 2016/ 2017/ 2018
- Chantal blijft slapen/ 2015
- Pauw/ 2015/2019
- Helden van de Top 2000/ 2015
- Pauls Puber Kookshow/ 2016
- Van der Vorst ziet sterren/ 2016
- Top 2000 à Go-Go/ 2016
- Wie steelt mijn show? / 2017
- The Big Music Quiz/ 2017 (Rebel became the winner)
- RTL Late Night/2018

Special Radio/livestream broadcasts

- 3FM Serious Request/ 2013 / 2014 / 2015 (night guest) / 2016 / 2017
- Countdown Café Radio Veronica/ 2015 (live registratie optreden Vorstin)
- Muziekcafé/ 2016/ 2018
- Kunststof/ 2018
- Spijkers met koppen/ 2018
- Een goed gesprek met.....Jett Rebel!/ 2018

== Awards ==
2014:

- 3FM Serious Talent Award
- 3FM Best Newcomer
- Edison Award Best newcomer

2015:

- 3FM Best Live act
- Zilveren Notenkraker

2017:

- 3FM Best Social
- Elle Personal Style Award

== Discography ==
=== Albums ===
- Venus & Mars (2014)
- Hits for Kids (2014)
- Tight Like A Baby Tiger (Live at the Paradiso) (2015)
- Truck (2016)
- Don't Die On Me Now (2016)
- Super Pop (2017)
- 7 (2018)
- Live Forever (2019)
- Pre-Apocalypse Party Playlist (2021)

=== EPs ===
- Venus (2013)
- Mars (2014)
- Spotify Live Session (2014)
- Yeah Yeah Yeah No (2019)

=== Singles ===
- "Do You Love Me at All" (2013)
- "Louise" (2013)
- "Tonight" (2014)
- "Pineapple Morning" (2014)
- "It's Cruel" (2016)
- "Lucky Boy" (2016)
- "All the Way" (2016)
- "Amy" (2018)
- "Good boy" (2018)
- "Perfect Lady" (2018)
- "Waiting for the Weekend" (2019)
- "Love Right Now" (2021)
