= Don't Die On Me Now =

Studio album by Jett Rebel
- Released: August 26, 2016
- Recorded: 2016
- Studio: Gold Foil Studios
- Genre: Rock'n'Roll
- Length: 57
- Label: Baby Tiger Records/Sony Music Entertainment
- Producer: Jett Rebel

Jett Rebel chronology
Truck (2016)	Don't Die On Me Now (2016)	Super Pop (2017)

Don't Die On Me Now is the fifth studio album by Dutch singer and multi-instrumentalist Jett Rebel. It was specially released at the Lowlands festival on August 20, 2016. The album was played in full. Festival visitors could already buy a copy of the new album, which was not available anywhere else, not even on streaming services. The official release date was one week later, on August 26, 2016.

== Title ==
The title of the album stands for the real music. The main goal in life for Rebel is to develop himself as a person and as a musician. Ever since he was a child, he's been living with the feeling that real music is slowly dying. He grew up in the 90s, he felt:"I only survived because 9 was 6 to me. I have to stop caring so much maybe, and let people enjoy their plastic music, but i can't."I hope some DJs decide to sell their MP3 players and buy a guitar. I also hope that singers realize that autotune or melodyne really doesn't teach you how to sing better. I also hope that live bands will stop with their tapes that are playing during the show. I hope the kids of the future realize what happened to music in the last 30 years and eventually save the real music".

== Singles and music videos ==
The first and only single Lucky Boy was released on August 22, 2016. On August 18, Lucky Boy was proclaimed a new Megahit by Dutch radiostation NPO 3FM, which meant that the single appeared regularly on the radio for a week. The music video was released on August 26, 2016.

On October 21, 2016, two music videos, "Tracks Of Your Tears" and "Look At Me Now", were released unexpectedly.

The "Don't Die on Me Now"-tour was sold out in 24 hours.

== Recording ==
Don't Die On Me Now was recorded live in Rebel's new analogue studio: Gold Foil Studios, with mostly studio equipment before 1977. The album Don't Die On Me Now was the first album on which Rebel can be heard with a power trio named Jett Rebel 3, with bassist Xander Vrienten and drummer Kees Schaper. Besides the fact that this was the first time Rebel played with a three-man formation, this was also the first time he was assisted by other fellow musicians.

== Track listing ==
All songs were written by Jett Rebel, except number 13, which was written by MacGyver Archimedes Masseuskamp.

1. "Devious Child" – 7:21
2. "Lucky Boy" – 2:38
3. "See Through City – 0:24
4. "Tracks Of Your Tears" – 4:32
5. "It's Real" – 7:10
6. "Nothing Turns Me On Like A Rock 'n roll Song" – 3:16
7. "Blonde Like You" – 3:55
8. "Take It As A Present" – 4:53
9. "Look At Me Now" – 5:47
10. "Teenage Man" – 2:18
11. "You Can Get Your Rock And Roll On" – 4:38
12. "Green" – 8:41
13. "Baby Tiger" – 1:24

== Personnel ==
The album is written, composed, arranged and produced and mixed by Jett Rebel. Audio engineering by Marc Alberto and Jett Rebel, assisted by Sam Verbeek. Darcy Proper did the mastering in the Wisseloord Studios.

- Jett Rebel – vocals, guitar, piano, organs, drums, percussion xylophone, mandolin and remaining instruments.
- Xander Vrienten – bass guitar, except on (8,9 &13)
- Kees Schaper – drums, except on (8 &13) and background vocals
- Marc Alberto – baritone saxophone, alto saxophone and flute (2) baritone saxophone, bass saxophone (7) triangle (9)
- Daniel van Loenen – trombone(s) (2 & 9)
- Amber Gomaa – background vocals and piano (12)
- Jessica Manuputty – background vocals and piano (12)
- Macgyver- all instruments and vocals (13)

== Release ==
The album has been released on compact disc and LP. The vinyl was pressed by Music On Vinyl.

The artwork concept is by Jett Rebel. Artwork and design by Melvin Mackaaij. Photography by Latoya van der Meeren. Artwork assembling and collage by Jett Rebel, Johan Vosmeijer and Mandy Woelkens. Additional photography by Jett Rebel and Melvin Mackaaij.

Don't Die on Me Now was released by Baby Tiger Records, Rebel's own label, a division of JJ Music V.o.F. It was exclusively licensed to Sony Music Entertainment Nederland B.V.

== Reception ==
The album was well received by several critics. Erwin Zijleman, in a review for his blog De krenten uit de pop, felt "Bluesrock dominates on Don't Die On Me Now, but it's not a dime in dozen. The bluesy riffs and guitar solos are also effortlessly combined with beautiful choirs, psychedelic moments and many other excursions off the beaten track of the bluesy rock of yesteryear. Listening to Don't Die On Me Now feels like randomly pulling out of a well-stocked 70s record case'. Peter van Capelle in a review for Maxazine, felt the album offers more 'influences from the rich pop history. Like two other long album tracks: the beautiful seven-minute soul track 'It's Real' and the psychedelic 'Green'. In both tracks Jelte's guitar playing leaves a big mark. Then he does something with 'Blonde Like You' that is currently remarkably lacking among the current generation of pop artists: a protest song against Donald Trump".
