= Rich Man =

Rich Man may refer to:

- "Rich Man" (Ten Sharp song), 1992
- Rich Man (album), a 2016 album by Doyle Bramhall II
- Rich Man (TV series), a 2018 South Korean television series
- "Rich Man", a 2019 song by Vampire Weekend, from the album Father of the Bride
- Rich Man (EP), a 2025 EP by Aespa
  - "Rich Man" (Aespa song), 2025
- "Rich Man", a 2026 song by Meghan Trainor, from the album Toy with Me
- "Rich Man", a 2026 song by Brock Phillips
