= Japanese Lovesong =

- 7" single

Single by Ten Sharp
- A-side: "Japanese Lovesong"
- B-side: "Goin' On"
- Released: June 1985
- Recorded: Studio Spitsbergen, Zuidbroek, The Netherlands, April 1985
- Length: 4:42 (7"); 10:43 (12")
- Label: Epic
- Songwriter(s): Ten Sharp (Marcel Kapteijn and Niels Hermes)
- Producer(s): Michiel Hoogenboezem

Ten Sharp singles chronology
| "When the Snow Falls" (1985) | "Japanese Lovesong" (1985) | "Last Words" (1986) |

Music video
- "Japanese Lovesong" (Veronica Club Magazine) on YouTube

"Japanese Lovesong" is the second single from the Dutch group Ten Sharp, released in June 1985. The song was written by the band and produced by Michiel Hoogenboezem. The single made it into the Dutch Top 40, reaching number 30. The song combines a reggae-feel with Eastern vocal lines and synth-sounds. In the extended version of the song there is a long instrumental part with a heavy bass driven hook. Samples of the falsetto choir also appear.

The B-side "Goin' On" is a piano ballad with vocals and piano only.

== Track listings ==
7" single

1. "Japanese Lovesong" - 4:42
2. "Goin' On" - 3:40

12" maxi

1. "Japanese Lovesong" (Extended Dance-Mix) - 10:43
2. "Goin' On" - 3:40

== Credits ==
- Produced by Michiel Hoogenboezem
- Mixing engineer: Ronald Prent
- Design: MaCo Productions

== Musicians ==
- Vocals: Marcel Kapteijn
- Keyboards and Piano: Niels Hermes
- Guitars: Martin Boers
- Bass: Ton Groen
- Drums: Wil Bouwes
