= Truck (Jett Rebel album) =

Studio album by Jett Rebel
- Released: 22 January 2016
- Recorded: 2015
- Genre: Lo-fi
- Length: 58
- Label: Baby Tiger Records/Sony Music Entertainment
- Producer: Jett Rebel

Jett Rebel chronology
Tight Like A Baby Tiger (Live At The Paradiso) (2015)	Truck (2016)	Don't Die On Me Now (2016)

The double album Truck is the fourth album by the Dutch singer and multi-instrumentalist Jett Rebel. It was released on January 22, 2016 and is the first of three albums that Jett Rebel has released within the year. The second album: Don't Die On Me Now was specially released as a surprise act at Lowlands on August 20, 2016; the official release was on August 26. The third album: Super Pop at Eurosonic Noorderslag January 13, 2017. The three albums are separate, but are connected like a triptych, the Experimentalist, the Musician and the Composer.

The first and only single "It's Cruel" was released on January 15, 2016. The music video appeared on YouTube on January 25, 2016. On January 4, MTV Nederland announced the album as one of the 8 most popular upcoming albums of 2016.

== Studio recording ==
The album was recorded in 2015 in the old house of Jett Rebel in Soesterberg on a four-track Tascam Portastudio cassette recorder. This was the first time Rebel recorded an album with analog technology. In this period of recording, experimenting, and the pleasure he experienced, he decided never to record digitally again. The title of the album came about in New York. Rebel was in November 2015 for a ten-day tour in New York, during an annual Live in Your living Room festival. The album was initially to be called Trucker's Towel. But once they arrived in New York and with the obvious sources of inspiration and signals Rebel received, the decision was made to go for the title Truck.

== Track listing ==
All songs written and instruments played by Jett Rebel

1. "It's Cruel" - 2:37
2. "Now I Know" - 2:59
3. "Trucker's Towel" - 1:10
4. "Can't Start Crying Now" - 4:13
5. "Get Well Soon Allyson" - 1:58
6. "Got a Clarinet!" - 0:48
7. "Do You Feel Alright?" - 2:13
8. "How to Take Care of You" - 1:32
9. "Sundown" - 3:19
10. "Casio Interlude 2" - 1:20
11. "The Love You Give:" - 3:48
12. "It's Cruel Reprise" - 1:21
13. "Les is More" - 0:02
14. "Tape 1 Side B (Extracts)" - 0:50
15. "Dream Girl" - 3:30
16. "Nothing's Going to Change My Mind" -2: 13
17. "In My Mind" - 1:42
18. "This Song Is Not Suitable for Radio" - 2:33
19. "I Want to Be a Songwriter" - 0:48
20. "Automatic Orange Juice Machine" - 1:48
21. "Sometimes You Don't Feel Happy" - 2:47
22. "Do You Feel Alright ?, (Pt. II)" - 3:02
23. "Going On" - 2:43
24. "Around You" - 3:24
25. "I've Got a New Watch / Overture" - 1:23
26. "Feel Like I Can Take on the World Again" - 1:25
27. "You're Still You Aren't You?" - 2:00

== Personnel ==
The album was written, composed, arranged and produced by Jett Rebel. He mixed it in pop stage Gebouw-T in Bergen Op Zoom (Netherlands). The mastering was done by Darcy Proper, senior mastering engineer from Wisseloord Studios who did the mastering of most of Rebel's albums.

Instruments used by Jett Rebel: Piano, a small Casio keyboard, old premier drum kit, a small wind organ and Karen (Gibsson ES330). Many bass guitars, different kind of mandoline's, acoustic guitars and some other string instruments.

The artwork of "Truck" was created by Melvin Mackaaij. The pictures were taken by Rebel himself, with an analog self-timer camera. The album has been released on compact disc, music cassette and LP. The vinyl was pressed by Music On Vinyl.

Truck is released by Baby Tiger Records, his own record label, division of JJ Music V.o.F. It was exclusively licensed to Sony Music Entertainment Nederland B.V.
