= Hits for Kids =

Studio album by Jett Rebel
- Released: October 31, 2014
- Recorded: 2014
- Studio: AIR Studios (London, United Kingdom); Wisseloord Studios (Hilversum, Netherlands)
- Genre: Pop
- Length: 46:18
- Label: Vosmeijer Media / SME

Jett Rebel chronology
Venus & Mars (2014)	Hits for Kids (2014)	Tight Like A Baby Tiger (Live At The Paradiso) (2015)

Singles from Hits for Kids
- 1. "Pineapple Morning" Released: 30 October 2014

Hits for Kids is the official debut album by Dutch singer and multi-instrumentalist Jett Rebel and his second studio album. The album was scheduled for release on October 31, 2014, through Sony Music Entertainment, but Rebel decided to release it the day before on various streaming services, on October 30, 2014. Pineapple Morning was the first and only single released on October 30, 2014.

== Recording ==
Rebel got help from Tony Platt in making essential choices. The producer/mixer Tony Platt gave the necessary advice and did the mix in his Platinum Tones studio in London. Hits for Kids was recorded in Soesterberg in his former old house and home studio. Rebel played all the instruments himself. Hits for kids was the last record Rebel recorded digitally. In Wisseloordstudio's some parts have been replaced by Rebel in cooperation with Platt. Like for example the drums. Rebel wanted to record with two mics. Also the guitars of some of the songs have been re-recorded." There they have, for example, a '55 Les Paul Goldtop and those beautiful old Strats. I've done a few acoustics and sometimes you can hear that Goldtop. You really hear that, a guitar that sounds expensive and rich and beautiful, both clean and totally driven. And I also used some very nice bass guitars. Hammond organ, grand piano, and a few tracks re-sung by beautiful, old vintage mics."

The name of the album does not refer to it being songs for children to listen to, but rather as memorable catchy sounds with childlike impulsiveness, as he states. The cover of the album was designed by Soesja Leugs.

The songs Gwen and Goosebumps Galore were performed on September 8, 2017 by Jett Rebel together with the Dutch Noordpool Orkest (orchestra) at the Prinsengrachtconcert in Meppel.

== Videos ==
A music video for "Pineapple Morning", the first track on the album, was released one day prior to the release of the album, on October 30, 2014. On 31 October 2014, 14 lyric videos were released from the album.

In addition to the single Pineapple Morning, two official video clips have been released from the album, Baby on 28 November 2014 and Sunshine on 25 February 2015. Baby's video is from the documentary Who The Fuck Is Jett Rebel? by Linda Hakeboom.

== Promotion ==
One day prior to the release of the album, Rebel held a live performance on the Dutch talk show De Wereld Draait Door. He played the songs "Pineapple Morning" and "Baby".

A hand-signed version of the album was given when pre-ordering the album at Bol.com, an online retailer.

== Track listing ==
All tracks are written by Jett Rebel

Hits for Kids
No.	Title	Length
1.	"Pineapple Morning"	3:07
2.	"When She's Older"	3:19
3.	"Sunshine"	2:59
4.	"Dance Underneath The Sheets"	4:32
5.	"Sister"	2:37
6.	"Mary Anne"	2:43
7.	"Tyrannosaurus Rex"	2:42
8.	"Secret"	2:59
9.	"Goosebumps Galore"	2:11
10.	"Baby"	4:28
11.	"Feels Like Loving To Me"	3:05
12.	"Hold You"	4:24
13.	"Gwen"	5:33
14.	"Harmony"	1:39
Total length:		46:18

== Personnel ==
The album is written, composed, arranged, produced by Jett Rebel. All songs written and instruments played by Jett Rebel.

- Tony Platt – engineering, mixing
- Ray Staff – mastering

The album has been released on compact disc and LP. The vinyl was pressed by Music On Vinyl. The artwork is by Jett Rebel and Soesja Leugs. All video lyrics come from Niels Bourgonje, Olf de Bruin and Dorien Bolhuis. Hits For Kids has been released by Vosmeijer Media. It was exclusively licensed to Sony Music Entertainment Nederland B.V.

Credits for Venus & Mars adapted from album liner notes.

== Charts ==
Chart (2014)	Peak position
Belgian Albums (Ultratop Flanders)	181
Dutch Albums (Album Top 100)	3

== Release history ==
Region	Date	Format(s)	Label
The Netherlands	October 30, 2014	Digital download	SME
The Netherlands	October 31, 2014	CD; LP	SME
