= Under the Water-Line =

- US, UK and Scandinavian version

Studio album by Ten Sharp
- Released: 5 March 1991 (first version); 2 April 1991 (second version)
- Studio: Spitsbergen (Zuidbroek, The Netherlands); Wisseloord (Hilversum, The Netherlands)
- Genre: Pop; synth-pop
- Length: 44:56
- Label: Columbia
- Producer: Michiel Hoogenboezem and Niels Hermes

Ten Sharp chronology
Under the Water-Line (00000001)	The Fire Inside (1993)

Alternative covers
- First version (Netherlands)

Alternative cover
- Second version

Singles from Under the Water-Line
- 1. "You" Released: 4 March 1991; 2. "Ain't My Beating Heart" Released: June 1991; 3. "When the Spirit Slips Away" Released: September 1991; 4. "When the Snow Falls" Released: autumn 1991; 5. "Rich Man" Released: March 1992

Under the Water-Line is the debut album by Dutch band Ten Sharp released on April 2, 1991 and contains the hit singles "You", "Ain't My Beating Heart" and "Rich Man". The album was released in March 1991 with 7 tracks, but by the time "You" became a national hit the album was expanded in April of the same year with three new songs to make it a full 10-track album. The album entered the top ten in Norway, Sweden, Austria and Switzerland.

The LP version of the album contains an early version of "Rich Man". This version is half a minute longer.

The song "When the Snow Falls" was previously released as a single in January 1985. The version that appears on the album contains the single version combined with the atmospheric introduction of the extended version.

== Track listings ==
=== 1st version (March 1991) ===
All tracks written by Ton Groen and Niels Hermes, except where noted.

1. "You" – 4:34
2. "Ain't My Beating Heart" – 4:15
3. "When the Spirit Slips Away" – 4:45
4. "Ray" – 4:01
5. "When the Snow Falls" (Hermes, Marcel Kapteijn) – 5:15
6. "Who Needs Women" – 4:42
7. "Lonely Heart" (Groen, Hermes, Kapteijn) – 4:55

=== 2nd version (April 1991) ===
1. "You" – 4:34
2. "When the Spirit Slips Away" – 4:45
3. "Rich Man" – 4:14
4. "Ain't My Beating Heart" – 4:15
5. "Lonely Heart" (Groen, Hermes, Kapteijn) – 4:55
6. "Who Needs Women" – 4:42
7. "Some Sails" – 4:16
8. "Ray" – 4:01
9. "When the Snow Falls" (Hermes, Kapteijn) – 5:15
10. "Closing Hour" – 3:59

Japanese bonus track

11. "You" (acoustic) – 3:59
- The Japanese pressing uses the same artwork as the 1st version.

== Personnel ==
Musicians

- Marcel Kapteijn – vocals
- Niels Hermes – instruments
- Tom Barlage – saxophone
- Hugo de Bruin – guitar on "Rich Man"
- Rob Jansen – additional drums on "Rich Man" and "Closing Hour"
- Stylus Horns – horns on "Rich Man"
- Martin Boers – guitar on "When the Snow Falls"
- Ton Groen – bass on "When the Snow Falls"
- Wil Bouwes – drums on "When the Snow Falls"

Technical

- Niels Hermes – production, programming
- Michiel Hoogenboezem – production, engineering
- Recorded at Spitsbergen and Wisseloord Studios
- Mixed at Wisseloord Studios
- Photography: Roy Tee
- Artwork: Theo Stapel

== Charts ==
=== Weekly charts ===
Chart (1992)	Peak position
Austrian Albums (Ö3 Austria)	9
Dutch Albums (Album Top 100)	8
Finnish Albums (Suomen virallinen lista)	3
French Albums (SNEP)	9
German Albums (Offizielle Top 100)	7
Norwegian Albums (VG-lista)	4
Swedish Albums (Sverigetopplistan)	6
Swiss Albums (Schweizer Hitparade)	5
UK Albums (OCC)	46

=== Year-end charts ===
Chart (1992)	Position
Austrian Albums (Ö3 Austria)	37
Dutch Albums (Album Top 100)	87
German Albums (Offizielle Top 100)	41
Swiss Albums (Schweizer Hitparade)	16

== Certifications ==
Certifications for Under the Water-Line
Region	Certification	Certified units/sales
Finland (Musiikkituottajat)	Gold	32,902
France (SNEP)	Gold	100,000^{*}
Germany (BVMI)	Gold	250,000^{^}
Netherlands (NVPI)	Platinum	100,000^{^}
Sweden (GLF)	Gold	50,000^{^}
Switzerland (IFPI Switzerland)	Gold	25,000^{^}
^{*} Sales figures based on certification alone.^{^} Shipments figures based on certification alone.
