= Super Pop =

Studio album by Jett Rebel
- Released: 13 January 2017
- Recorded: 2016
- Studio: Gold Foil Studios
- Genre: Pop, avant garde
- Length: 44
- Label: Baby Tiger Records / Sony Music Entertainment
- Producer: Jett Rebel

Jett Rebel chronology
Don't Die On Me Now (2016)	Super Pop (2017)	7 (2018)

Super Pop is the sixth studio album by Dutch singer and multi-instrumentalist Jett Rebel and the final piece of the last triptych that Rebel released within 12 months. The launch of Super Pop was on January 13, 2017 during Eurosonic Noorderslag. Rebel gave a special midnight performance in the record store Plato of Groningen. Fans could buy the first Super Pop album in a limited edition of pink pressed vinyl.

The first and only single "All The Way", was released together with a lyric music video on December 2, 2016.

== Pop-up Museum ==
During Eurosonic Noorderslag a special pop-up museum was set up in the Der Aa-kerk in Groningen about Jett Rebel, this coincided with the release of Super Pop.

In the museum personal belongings, instruments, photos, clothing and the original TASCAM Portastudio cassette recorder that Jett Rebel used for the recording of Truck (album) could be seen. Also the original cover of the album Super Pop, as Jett Rebel had made it himself, could be admired. Especially for the opening there were statues of Jett Rebel for sale in all sizes, which were made with a 3D print. The official opening was January 12, 2016 and lasted until January 14, 2016.

At the launch of his album, Jett Rebel gave a solo performance in the Der Aa-kerk.

== Record Store Day ==
Jett Rebel was the Dutch ambassador of Record Store Day on 22 April 2017. A 7" by Jett Rebel was released on RSD, a double A-side on pink vinyl featuring the singles Better Off Together and Daydreamin' from the album Super Pop. This single was available for free and exclusively to the first 5,000 visitors of Record Store Day, in almost 100 independent record stores in the Netherlands. Rebel saw this title as a great honour: "Being asked to be an ambassador for Record Store Day is a huge honour. To be honest, I still can't believe it. I feel like I'm one of many, but of course I'm not. Vinyl has played an important role all my life".

Rebel gave a number of performances in various record stores that day, along with guitarist Nick Croes.

== Recording ==
Like the previous album, the album was recorded in Rebel's own analogue studio: Gold Foil Studio. Jett Rebel was again alone in the studio. He loves to do everything himself, to be the singer, the drummer, the guitarist, the organist, the bassist, the engineer, the producer etc.

== Track listing ==
All songs written by Jett Rebel

1. "Better Off Together" – 3:59
2. "Super Pop Tune" – 0:24
3. "High School Reunion' – 4:38
4. "All The Way" – 3:57
5. "Just In Case You're Ever Down Again" – 3:59
6. "Family Pictures" – 2:19
7. "Stop Playing With My Heart" – 4:38
8. "Sorry (Horses)" – 4:28
9. "There Has Been A Time" – 2:12
10. "Promises" – 3:47
11. "Daydreamin' " – 2:58
12. "Can't Live Without You" – 4:35
13. "Sissy Finally Moved To The City" – 6:09

== Personnel ==
The album is written, composed, arranged, produced, and engineering by Jett Rebel. All instruments and vocals by Jett Rebel. Recorded and mixed at Gold Fold Studios. Mastering by Darcy Proper in the Wisseloord Studios.

The album has been released on compact disc and LP. Before release, a limited edition was pressed in bright pink vinyl by Music On Vinyl.

The artwork concept and cover is by Jett Rebel, the cover is made by hand. Pictures are mainly taken by himself, some pictures taken by crew and band members. Photo trimming by Jett Rebel. Collage photography by Studio Leeman. Digital photo editing/ layout and typography by Melvin Mackaaij.

Super Pop is released by Baby Tiger Records, his own record label, a division of JJ Music V.o.F. It was exclusively licensed to Sony Music Entertainment Nederland B.V.

== Reception ==
Anna Kersten, in a review for Nieuweplaat, felt the album "was diverse, but it does form one whole. Rock, pop, jazz, blues, big band: everything alternates, without losing uniformity. Each song shows how musical Jett Rebel is'. Erwin Zijleman, in a review for his blog De krenten uit de pop: "the album sounds like the old records from the 70s Super Pop will be criticized by the serious music press, but it's really a record full of great moments. With a bit more focus, Jett Rebel makes a record that amazes the world someday, until then I'm very happy with Super Pop".
