= Pineapple Morning =

Single by Jett Rebel

Single by Jett Rebel

from the album Hits for Kids
- Released: October 30, 2014
- Genre: Pop
- Length: 3:07
- Label: SME
- Songwriter(s): Jett Rebel
- Producer(s): Jett Rebel

Jett Rebel singles chronology
"Louise" (2014)	"Pineapple Morning" (2014)

Music video
- "Pineapple Morning" on YouTube

"Pineapple Morning" is a song by Dutch singer-songwriter Jett Rebel. It is the first track and single for his second album, Hits for Kids. It was released on October 30, 2014.

== Charts ==
Chart (2014)	Peak position
Netherlands (Single Top 100)	77
