= When the Spirit Slips Away =

Single by Ten Sharp

from the album Under the Water-Line
- Released: September 1991
- Recorded: Studio Spitsbergen; Wisseloord Studios autumn-winter 1990
- Length: 4:14
- Label: Columbia
- Composer(s): Niels Hermes
- Lyricist(s): Ton Groen
- Producer(s): Michiel Hoogenboezem and Niels Hermes

Ten Sharp singles chronology
"Ain't My Beating Heart" (1991)	"When the Spirit Slips Away" (1991)	"When the Snow Falls" (1991)

"When the Spirit Slips Away" is the seventh single from the Dutch group Ten Sharp, released in September 1991. The music is composed by Niels Hermes and the lyrics are written by Ton Groen. There was no official video shot for this single.

The B-side "The "O" " is an instrumental piano piece, written by Niels Hermes. "He Played Real Good For Free" is a Joni Mitchell cover in the version of David Crosby, played by singer Marcel Kapteijn.

== Track listings ==
7" single

1. "When The Spirit Slips Away" - 4:14
2. "When The Spirit Slips Away" (Instrumental) - 4:13

CD-single

1. "When The Spirit Slips Away" - 4:14
2. "The "O" " - 3:18
3. "He Played Real Good For Free" - 4:02
4. "When The Spirit Slips Away" (Instrumental) - 4:13

== Credits ==
- Vocals: Marcel Kapteijn
- Instruments and programming: Niels Hermes
- Produced by Michiel Hoogenboezem and Niels Hermes
- Engineered by Michiel Hoogenboezem
- Saxophone: Tom Barlage
- Recorded and mixed at Spitsbergen Studios, Wisseloord Studios and Studio Zeezicht
- Photography: Roy Tee
