= When the Snow Falls =

1985 single by Ten Sharp

- 7" single

Single by Ten Sharp
- A-side: "When the Snow Falls"
- B-side: "Time and Time"
- Released: January 1985
- Recorded: Studio Spitsbergen, Zuidbroek, the Netherlands, November 1984
- Length: 4:20 (7"); 8:15 (12")
- Label: Epic
- Songwriters: Ten Sharp (Marcel Kapteijn and Niels Hermes)
- Producer: Michiel Hoogenboezem

Ten Sharp singles chronology
"When the Snow Falls" (1985)	"Japanese Lovesong" (1985)

Music video
- "When The Snow Falls" (NCRV Wissels) on YouTube

"When the Snow Falls" is the first single from the Dutch group Ten Sharp, released in January 1985. The song was written by the band and produced by Michiel Hoogenboezem. The single made it into the Vara's Verrukkelijke 15 charts and entered the Dutch Top 40 Tip-charts at the end of January 1985. The extended version of the song adds an atmospheric intro to the song. Halfway the song there are guitar solos and synth-arpeggios laid on the instrumental basic tracks. The intro is also featured on the version on the album Under the Water-Line.

The B-side "Time and Time" is a heavy dance-track. The song was actually recorded in a demo recording-session, but was remixed for the single.

== Track listings ==
7" single

1. "When the Snow Falls" - 4:20
2. "Time and Time" - 3:55

12" maxi

1. "When the Snow Falls" (Extended Version) - 8:15
2. "Time and Time" - 3:55

== Credits ==
- Produced by Michiel Hoogenboezem
- Engineered by Ronald Prent
- Artwork: Theo Stapel

== Musicians ==
- Vocals: Marcel Kapteijn
- Keyboards: Niels Hermes
- Guitars: Martin Boers
- Bass: Ton Groen
- Drums: Wil Bouwes

== 1991 version ==
"When the Snow Falls"
- 1991 version

Single by Ten Sharp

from the album Under the Water-Line
- A-side: "When the Snow Falls"
- B-side: "Some Sails" (7", CD-single); "All in Love Is Fair" (Stevie Wonder cover) (CD-single); "Closing Hour" (CD-single)
- Released: autumn 1991
- Recorded: Studio Spitsbergen, Zuidbroek, The Netherlands, November 1984
- Length: 4:05
- Label: Columbia
- Songwriters: Ten Sharp(Marcel Kapteijn and Niels Hermes)
- Producers: Michiel Hoogenboezem and Niels Hermes

Ten Sharp singles chronology
"When the Spirit Slips Away" (1991)	"When the Snow Falls" (1991)	"Rich Man" (1992)

"When the Snow Falls" was released again in late 1991. This version was slightly edited down from 4:20 to 4:05.

== Track listings ==
7" single

1. "When the Snow Falls" - 4:05
2. "Some Sails" - 4:15

CD-single maxi

1. "When the Snow Falls" - 4:05
2. "Some Sails" - 4:15
3. "All in Love Is Fair" (Stevie Wonder cover) - 3:57
4. "Closing Hour" - 3:58

== Credits ==
- Produced by Michiel Hoogenboezem and Niels Hermes
- Photography: Rob Verhorst
