= You (Ten Sharp song) =

1991 single by Ten Sharp

Single by Ten Sharp

from the album Under the Water-Line
- B-side: "When the Snow Falls"; "White Gold"
- Released: 4 March 1991
- Length: 4:35
- Label: Columbia
- Songwriters: Ton Groen; Niels Hermes
- Producers: Niels Hermes; Michiel Hoogenboezem

Ten Sharp singles chronology
"Way of the West" (1987)	"You" (1991)	"Ain't My Beating Heart" (1991)

Alternative cover
- UK version

Music video
- "You" on YouTube

"You" is a song by Dutch band Ten Sharp. It was released in March 1991 by Columbia Records as the lead single from their first album, Under the Water-Line (1991), and became a hit in many countries, including France, Norway, and Sweden, where it reached number one.

== Background and writing ==
"You" was the band's first single as a duo. The lyrics were written by Ton Groen, while the music was composed by Niels Hermes. French music author Elia Habib described the song as "the notes from the piano are sharply separated with a beautiful consistency and constitute the backdrop of a melody served by the power of Marcel Kapteijn's voice".

== Chart performances ==
"You" was a number-one hit in Norway, spending 16 weeks in the top ten. In Sweden, the single peaked at number one for two weeks. In France, "You" also peaked at number one for two weeks. "You" peaked at number four in Germany and remained on the chart for 43 weeks, and it reached the same position in Ireland. In Austria, the song reached number two, while in Switzerland, it spent 32 weeks in the top 40, peaking at number three. It was the group's only hit in the UK, peaking at number 10.

== Track listings ==
7-inch, mini-CD, and cassette single
No.	Title	Length
1.	"You"	4:35
2.	"You" (instrumental)	4:24

12-inch and CD single
No.	Title	Length
1.	"You"	4:35
2.	"When the Snow Falls"	5:13
3.	"White Gold"	3:30
4.	"You" (instrumental)	4:24

== Personnel ==
- Vocals: Marcel Kapteijn
- Instruments and programming: Niels Hermes
- Produced by Michiel Hoogenboezem & Niels Hermes
- Engineered by Michiel Hoogenboezem
- Guitar on "When The Snow Falls" & "White Gold": Martin Boers
- Bass on "When The Snow Falls" & "White Gold": Ton Groen
- Drums on "When The Snow Falls" & "White Gold": Wil Bouwes
- Recorded at Spitsbergen and Wisseloord Studios
- Mixed at Wisseloord Studios
- Artwork: Theo Stapel

== Charts ==
=== Weekly charts ===
Chart (1991–1992)	Peak position
Austria (Ö3 Austria Top 40)	2
Belgium (Ultratop 50 Flanders)	11
Denmark (IFPI)	2
Europe (Eurochart Hot 100)	2
Finland (Suomen virallinen lista)	4
France (SNEP)	1
Germany (GfK)	4
Greece (IFPI)	6
Ireland (IRMA)	4
Netherlands (Dutch Top 40)	3
Netherlands (Single Top 100)	3
Norway (VG-lista)	1
Sweden (Sverigetopplistan)	1
Switzerland (Schweizer Hitparade)	3
UK Singles (Official Charts)	10
UK Airplay (Music Week)	3
Uruguay (UPI)	8

=== Year-end charts ===
Chart (1991)	Position
Netherlands (Dutch Top 40)	22
Netherlands (Single Top 100)	35

Chart (1992)	Position
Austria (Ö3 Austria Top 40)	10
Belgium (Ultratop)	88
Europe (Eurochart Hot 100)	6
Europe (European Hit Radio)	29
Germany (Media Control)	16
Sweden (Topplistan)	5
Switzerland (Schweizer Hitparade)	4
UK Singles (OCC)	63
UK Airplay (Music Week)	15

=== Decade-end charts ===
Chart (1990–1999)	Rank
Austria (Ö3 Austria Top 40)	40

== Release history ==
Region	Date	Format(s)	Label(s)	Ref.
Netherlands	4 March 1991	—N/a	Columbia	
Australia	22 July 1991	CD; cassette	Columbia	
Australia	10 February 1992	CD; cassette (re-release)	Columbia	
United Kingdom	9 March 1992	7-inch vinyl; 12-inch vinyl; CD; cassette	Columbia	
Japan	21 September 1992	Mini-CD	Epic	
