= Venus & Mars (Jett Rebel album) =

Studio album by Jett Rebel
- Released: April 19, 2014
- Genre: Pop
- Length: 44:11
- Label: Vosmeijer Media / SME
- Producer: Jett Rebel

Jett Rebel chronology
Venus & Mars (2014)	Hits for Kids (2014)

Singles from Venus & Mars
- 1. "Do You Love Me at All" Released: 7 June 2013; 2. "Louise" Released: 6 September 2013; 3. "Tonight" Released: 17 January 2014

Venus & Mars is the first studio album by Dutch pop singer songwriter and multi-instrumentalist Jett Rebel, released by the record label Sony Music Entertainment on April 19, 2014 in the Netherlands. The album is composed of his first two EPs, Venus and Mars.Venus was released on May 26, 2013 and Mars on January 15, 2014. Two new songs have been added to the album, "#" and bonus track "On Top of the World", the bonus track for The Amazing Spider-Man 2. On April 19, 2014, these EPs were combined for one album. It is not considered to be his debut album. The album was produced by Rebel with help from Dutch producer JJJ Sielcken for the first seven tracks. Venus & Mars spawned the singles "Do You Love Me at All", "Louise" and Tonight".

== Singles ==
Several singles were taken from the album. EP Venus debut single Do You Love Me at All was the first single with which Jett Rebel showed something of himself, the release was on June 7, 2013. The music video was released on July 12, 2013. With the single Do You Love Me at All, Rebel was proclaimed in August 2013 and nominated by radio station NPO 3FM as 3FM Serious Talent. He won this 3FM serious talent award on April 8, 2014. "Louise" was the second single released with a music video on September 6, 2013. Rebel told NPO 3FM what Louise is about: "If I'm honest, it's about someone being in love with you, and you ending up with that person out of loneliness without actually sharing the feelings". On the release day of Louise, Jett Rebel was a guest for the first time on the popular television program De Wereld Draait Door to play his single live.

More than 4 months later the 3rd single and accompanying music video "Tonight" (EP Mars) was launched on January 17, 2014. Tonight was proclaimed as 3FM Megahit by the NPO 3FM one week earlier on January 10, 2014. Rebel was partly inspired for Tonight by the musical West Side Story. "Rebel wanted to create the same vibe as the big party night in this musical. The song should feel like a kind of announcement or opening of something". Initially, it was not intended that Tonight was chosen as the 3rd single. Gerard Ekdom (Radio DJ), NPO 3FM brought this idea to Rebel, because Ekdom thought this was a strong song and so it happened.

On April 11, 2014 the 4th and last single from the album Venus & Mars was released. The bonus track for The Amazing Spider-Man 2, "On Top of the World, was released with a music video on April 10, 2014. On Top Of The World appeared on the soundtrack of the film and could also be heard during the credits of the film. Rebel said: "I see similarities between Jelte Tuinstra and Peter Parker. He is also a maverick with an alter ego. I'm very proud of this collaboration, because in this way I can bring my music to the attention in a different way. Not via a single, EP or an album, but via a soundtrack, that's new to me."

== Track listing ==
All tracks are written by Jett Rebel.

Venus & Mars
No.	Title	Producer(s)	Length
1.	"Do You Love Me at All"	Jett Rebel; JJJ Sielcken	2:38
2.	"Louise"	Rebel; JJJ Sielcken	3:24
3.	"Should Have Told You"	Rebel; JJJ Sielcken	3:33
4.	"Private Beach Party"	Rebel; JJJ Sielcken	0:34
5.	"Romance"	Rebel; JJJ Sielcken	3:02
6.	"Darla My Darling"	Rebel; JJJ Sielcken	3:27
7.	"#"	Rebel; JJJ Sielcken	2:02
8.	"That Place"	Rebel	4:43
9.	"Neither of You"	Rebel	2:55
10.	"Hurts So Nice"	Rebel	3:29
11.	"Tonight"	Rebel	3:16
12.	"Sleep Overs"	Rebel	3:03
13.	"Sugar"	Rebel	4:44
14.	"On Top of the World"	Rebel	3:21
Total length:			44:11

== Personnel ==
Credits for Venus & Mars adapted from album liner notes.

Track 1 through 7

- Jett Rebel – instrumentation, vocals, lyrics, production
- JJJ Sielcken – production, engineering
- Hans Weekhout – mastering

Track 8 through 13

- Hetkantoor Muziekproducties – mixing
- Jett Rebel – instrumentation, vocals, lyrics, engineering, production
- JJJ Sielcken – mixing
- Hans Weekhout – mastering

"On Top of the World"

- Jett Rebel – instrumentation, vocals, lyrics, production
- Huub Reijnders – mixing
- Sony Music USA – mastering
- Wisseloord Studios – mixing
- Rick van Wort – drums

Artistic personnel

- Jurriaan Hoefsmit – photography
- Fanny Morriën – design
- Steven G. Tuinstra – original paintings

The two EPs are digitally recorded. Jett Rebel stopped recording his music digitally in 2015. He is an active supporter of analog recording. All instruments and vocals are played by Rebel himself.Except for the drums on On top of the World.

The album has been released on compact disc and LP. On April 19, 2014 at Record Store Day, a special limited edition of the two EP's was released on colored vinyl, Venus in psychedelic green and Mars in psychedelic red. Of these, 500 were pressed by Music On Vinyl. Venus & Mars is also published on black vinyl. Venus & Mars has been released by Vosmeijer Media. It was exclusively licensed to Sony Music Entertainment Nederland B.V.

== Charts ==
Chart (2014)	Peak position
Dutch Albums (Album Top 100)	20

== Release history ==
Region	Date	Format(s)	Label
The Netherlands	April 19, 2014	LP	SME
The Netherlands	May 9, 2014	Digital download; CD	SME
