= The Look of Love (Trijntje Oosterhuis album) =

The Look of Love: Burt Bacharach Songbook

Studio album by Trijntje Oosterhuis and Metropole Orchestra
- Released: 20 November 2006 (NL); 17 January 2007 (Japan)
- Studio: Polyhymnia Recording, MCO (Hilversum); The Village Recorder (Los Angeles)
- Genre: Pop, Jazz
- Length: 56:58
- Label: Blue Note
- Producer: Patrick Williams

Trijntje Oosterhuis chronology
See You As I Do (2005)	The Look of Love: Burt Bacharach Songbook (2006)	Who'll Speak for Love (2007)

Metropole Orchestra chronology
My Flame Burns Blue (2006)	The Look of Love (2006)	Sound Theories (2007)

Professional ratings
Review scores
Source	Rating
Spits.nl	Link (Dutch)
Vrouw.nl	Favorable ("Damn good") Link (Dutch)

The Look of Love: Burt Bacharach Songbook is an album by Trijntje Oosterhuis and Metropole Orchestra, released on 20 November 2006. This album is the fourth album for Trijntje Oosterhuis, and was released in Japan on 17 January 2007 under the artist name Traincha with a bonus song "Anyone Who Had a Heart (live)". The album consists of Burt Bacharach covers.

The Metropole Orchestra was conducted by Vince Mendoza, who gained notoriety for arranging the Grammy winning album Both Sides Now by Joni Mitchell. The album was mixed by Al Schmitt.

The album was certified Platinum on the day of release for having shipped more than 70,000 copies and debuted at No. 1 on the Dutch album chart for two weeks. Oosterhuis performed a Christmas tour with the Metropole Orchestra from 6 December 2006 onwards to promote the album.

== Track listing ==
#	Title	Original version for	Length	Note
1	"Do You Know the Way to San Jose"	Dionne Warwick in Valley of the Dolls by Dionne Warwick	3:13	
2	"The Look of Love"	Dusty Springfield	4:34	
3	"A House Is Not a Home"	Dionne Warwick	3:54	
4	"I Say a Little Prayer"	Dionne Warwick	2:50	
5	"Waiting for Charlie (To Come Home)"	Etta James	4:25	
6	"I'll Never Fall in Love Again"	musical Promises, Promises	3:07	
7	"Falling Out of Love"	Aretha Franklin	4:11	
8	"Walk on By"	Dionne Warwick	3:09	
9.	"Alfie"	Cilla Black	4:35	
10.	"Anyone Who Had a Heart"	Dionne Warwick	5:27	
11	"This House Is Empty Now"	Painted from Memory by Elvis Costello	5:13	
12	"(They Long to Be) Close to You"	The Carpenters	3:46	
13.	"The Windows of the World"	Dionne Warwick	4:44	
14.	"That's What Friends Are For"	film Night Shift by Rod Stewart	3:50	
15.	"Anyone Who Had a Heart" (live)	Dionne Warwick	6:02	Bonus track in Japan version of 2007

== Credits ==
- Trijntje Oosterhuis
- Metropole Orkest
- Burt Bacharach – piano
- Rob Shrock – piano
- Hans Vroomans – piano
- Peter Tiehuis – guitar, piano
- Martijn Vink – drums
- Caroline Dest – backing vocals
- Lodewijk VanGorp – backing vocals
- Patrick Williams – arranger, producer
- Fred Williams – producer
- Al Schmitt – engineer, mixing

== Charts ==
=== Weekly charts ===
Chart (2006–07)	Peak position
Belgian Albums (Ultratop Flanders)	27
Dutch Albums (Album Top 100)	1

=== Year-end charts ===
Chart (2006)	Position
Dutch Albums (Album Top 100)	8
Chart (2007)	Position
Dutch Albums (Album Top 100)	10
