= See You as I Do =

Studio album by Trijntje Oosterhuis
- Released: 9 October 2005
- Recorded: Studio Traincha (Amsterdam)
- Genre: Pop
- Length: 62:02
- Label: EMI
- Producer: James Hallawell, Trijntje Oosterhuis

Trijntje Oosterhuis chronology
Strange Fruit (2004)	See You as I Do (2005)	The Look of Love (2006)

See You as I Do is the third solo album by Trijntje Oosterhuis and was released on 9 October 2005. During Trijntje's pregnancy she decided not to tour and perform, but use the time at home in her own studio to record an album. The album peaked at #5 in the Dutch album chart and was certified Gold. Trijntje started her musical career singing for Candy Dulfer's third album Big Girl and on Trijntje's third album, Candy is featured playing the saxophone on three tracks.

This album has been released with the Copy Control protection system in some regions.

== Track listing ==
#	Title	Length
1.	"Everybody Needs Somebody"	5:16
2.	"See You as I Do"	5:58
3.	"To Forget You"	4:09
4	"Hurting Game"	4:17
5.	"On the 4th of July"	3:48
6.	"It Isn't Over"	4:27
7.	"How I Wish"	3:58
8.	"Friend of Mine"	4:10
9.	"Joy"	4:10
10.	"My Angel"	4:17
11.	"What More Can I Say"	5:08
12.	"Wild Horses"	6:30
13.	"Mother's Love"	5:45

== Charts ==
=== Weekly charts ===
Chart (2005)	Peak position
Dutch Albums (Album Top 100)	5

=== Year-end charts ===
Chart (2005)	Position
Dutch Albums (Album Top 100)	40
