= Ten Sharp =

Dutch pop band

- Origin: Amsterdam, Netherlands
- Genres: Synth-pop; pop rock; sophisti-pop
- Years active: 1982–1987, 1990-present
- Labels: Columbia, Epic
- Members: Marcel Kapteijn; Niels Hermes
- Past members: Martin Boers; Ton Groen; Wil Bouwes; Joop van de Berg
- Website: http://www.tensharp.com/

Ten Sharp is a Dutch band, sometimes labeled as a one-hit wonder group, because they are best known for their early 1990s hit song "You", a hit in 13 European countries in 1991 and 1992. The two band members are Marcel Kapteijn (vocals) and Niels Hermes (keyboards).

== History ==
=== Formation (1982) ===
Streets was a local band formed in the beginning 1982, when the two rival bands Prizoner and Pin-Up came together in the same room. Influenced by Thin Lizzy, they started writing symphonic rocksongs and played mainly in the city of Purmerend and the local area.

The first gig was at the Hutspop festival on 3 March 1982. The band at this stage was Marcel Kapteijn on vocals and guitar, Niels Hermes on keyboards, Martin Boers on leadguitar, Ton Groen on bass and Joop van de Berg played the drums. In the summer of 1982, Joop van de Berg was replaced by Wil Bouwes from Neon Graffiti. This would be the line-up until the break-up in 1987.

=== Streets (1982–1984) ===
In October 1982, the group was invited to record three songs at Vara's Popkrant, which resulted in national airplay. In April 1983, they played live at KRO Rocktempel which brought them to several record companies, but no one seemed to be interested. Around the summer of 1983, Niels Hermes' good old Fender Rhodes and ARP monophonic synthesizer were stolen. This resulted in buying the polyphonic Roland JX-3P and Yamaha DX7 synthesizers which caused a big change in sound.

Driven by this new impulse, they locked themselves in Fort Spijkerboor to write new songs to impress the record companies. When they got out in February 1984 with a brand-new demo, finally there was interest at CBS Records. In September 1984, they recorded three songs in Studio Spitsbergen with Michiel Hoogenboezem including a demo-version of "When the Snow Falls". The plans were there to release the first single, until the record company found out there was already another band in the US called Streets. The band had to change its name in October 1984. Ten Sharp was chosen because of the sound of the name.

=== First singles as Ten Sharp (1985–1987) ===
"When the Snow Falls" was the first single, released in January 1985. The song ended up in the Tip-parade and Vara's Verrukkelijke 15. It gave the band a lot of attention on radio and television. The second single "Japanese Lovesong" ended up in the charts (number 30) in July 1985, while having a busy schedule with live-performances through the club-circuit in the Netherlands. The next single "Last Words" failed to hit the charts and ended up in the Tip-parade in January 1986. The band shot their first video for the song.

After a year of recording demo's and touring through the Netherlands, they recorded their fourth single "Way Of The West" in February 1987, a guitar-heavy rocksong which failed immediately. CBS Records was not happy with the song and dropped the band. On 17 October 1987 they played their last show in Hazerswoude as a 5-piece band.

=== Career as songwriters (1987–1989) ===
Niels Hermes and Ton Groen did continue writing songs for other artists. In 1989, they contributed two songs for the National Songcontest, without success, and Niels played in the band of Conny Vandenbos.

After two years of songwriting, they asked Marcel Kapteijn to sing on the demos that already included "You" and "Ain't My Beating Heart". When Sony Music heard the demos they were very interested in the songs sung by Marcel, who was still fed up with the music business. Ten Sharp would be Marcel Kapteijn on vocals, Niels Hermes on keys and songwriting, and Ton Groen who provided the lyrics.

=== Under the Water-Line and commercial success from You (1991–1992) ===
It was the end of 1990, when they recorded 6 songs for Under the Water-Line at Studio Spitsbergen with producer Michiel Hoogenboezem. The name "Under the Water-Line" was chosen because of the way they liked to work: in the background.

The album was released on 13 April 1991, together with the single "You". The song became a national hit rapidly, and so did the album. By the time the single "Ain't My Beating Heart" was released, the 7-track album was expanded to a 10-track full album, for release in other countries. After the singles "When the Spirit Slips Away" and the re-release of "When the Snow Falls", they released the song "Rich Man" in March 1992, which resulted in their third hit from the album. At this time, "You" was just released across Europe, enjoying a lot of success. The band toured through Europe to promote the single on TV and radio stations. Because of the line-up, live performances were done only with piano and vocals, sometimes joined by Tom Barlage on saxophone. This continued until the fall of 1992.

=== The Fire Inside (1993–1994) ===
The second album was recorded in the fall of 1992, in the Wisseloord Studios, Hilversum with Michiel Hoogenboezem producing together with Niels Hermes. The record became more intense and intimate than its predecessor.

The album was released in May 1993, together with the single "Dreamhome (Dream On)" which entered the Dutch charts. The second single "Lines On Your Face" did not. In March 1994, "Rumours in the City" was released. The song was inspired by a promotional trip to Argentina in 1992. The video got support from Amnesty International with footage out of the archives of Amnesty. The single did enter the charts.

=== Shop of Memories and Roots Live (1995–1996) ===
In their third album, from February 1995, Ten Sharp returned as a full band, with the musicians Bennie Top (drums), Ton Groen (bass), Nick Bult (keyboard), Hubert Heeringa (saxophone, violin and horn) and Yelle Sieswerda (guitar). The album was followed by the Marlboro Flashback Tour in 1996, in which the band played songs from groups such as the Eagles, Steely Dan, Crowded House, Hall & Oates, E.L.O., Steve Miller, the Rolling Stones and the Beatles.

During that tour, the album Roots Live was recorded. This live cover album was released on 2 November 1996.

=== Everything and More - The Best Of (2000) ===
On 13 May 2000 the band released a compilation album with 5 new songs. The singles "Beautiful" and "Everything" were released for this album. The single "Beautiful" was number one on the Argentinean charts.

=== Stay (2003) ===
On 1 March 2003 the album Stay was released, with 12 new songs, in which Tom Bakker was responsible for a major part of the compositions. This time, the production was given to Peter van Asten. Guitarist Rob Winter, bassist Giovanni Caminita, drummer Ton Dijkman, and Tom Bakker itself formed the backbone of the album. They, in turn, were accompanied by a string orchestra, the hammond of Nico Brandsen, the percussion of Antoon Toolsma and the brass work of the Jay Horns.

=== You (2009) ===
In March 2009, a remake of hit single "You" was released.

=== Maybe (2016–2017) ===
On 9 November 2016, Ten Sharp met rapper Cho and Ali B in the Dutch TV show Ali B op volle toeren and they exchanged their musical approach to their hits: Cho and Ali B performed their version of Ten Sharp's "You" and Ten Sharp put Cho's "Misschien Wel Hè" in their own musical words. As a result of this exchange, Ten Sharp made a studio version of the song they performed called "Maybe", and this was released on iTunes, Spotify and YouTube on the same day as the encounter. On 9 January 2017 a music video for this single was released on YouTube.

=== Their Ultimate Collection (2022) ===
In November 2022, the compilation album Their Ultimate Collection was released on CD and vinyl, featuring "You", "Ain't My Beating Heart", "Rich Man", "Japanese Lovesong", "When the Snow Falls" and more. Alongside this release, all the band's albums were finally released on the digital streaming platforms including Spotify, Apple Music and Deezer. Marcel and Niels promoted the album with selected TV and radio performances.

=== Elke Dag / Every Day (2023) ===
In 2023, Niels wrote their (first) Dutch single "Elke Dag" (and the English version "Every Day"). It was released in November 2023 and supported by a music video.

== Discography ==
=== Studio albums ===
- Under the Water-Line (1991)
- The Fire Inside (1993)
- Shop of Memories (1995)
- Stay (2003)
- Something & More (2019)

=== Live albums ===
- Roots Live (1996)

=== Compilation albums ===
- Everything and More – The Best of Ten Sharp (2000)

=== Singles ===
Year	Single	Peak positions											Album
Year	Single	NED	BEL (FLA)	ITA	FRA	GER	AUT	SWI	SWE	NOR	IRE	UK	Album
1985	"When the Snow Falls"	50	—	—	—	—	—	—	—	—	—	—	singles only
1985	"Japanese Lovesong"	39	—	—	—	—	—	—	—	—	—	—	singles only
1986	"Last Words"	—	—	—	—	—	—	—	—	—	—	—	singles only
1987	"Way of the West"	—	—	—	—	—	—	—	—	—	—	—	singles only
1991	"You"	3	11	15	1	4	2	3	1	1	4	10	Under The Water-Line
1991	"Ain't My Beating Heart"	27	—	—	—	68	—	27	—	—	—	63	Under The Water-Line
1991	"When the Spirit Slips Away"	84	—	—	—	—	—	—	—	—	—	—	Under The Water-Line
1991	"When the Snow Falls"	—	—	—	—	—	—	—	—	—	—	—	Under The Water-Line
1992	"Rich Man"	19	44	—	—	—	—	—	—	—	—	—	Under The Water-Line
1993	"Dreamhome (Dream On)"	24	—	23	—	52	—	—	—	—	—	—	The Fire Inside
1993	"Lines on Your Face"	—	—	—	—	—	—	—	—	—	—	—	The Fire Inside
1994	"Rumours in the City"	33	—	—	—	—	—	—	—	—	—	—	The Fire Inside
1994	"After All the Love Has Gone"	—	—	—	—	62	—	—	—	—	—	—	Shop Of Memories
1995	"Feel My Love"	—	—	—	—	87	—	—	—	—	—	—	Shop Of Memories
1995	"Shop of Memories"	—	—	—	—	—	—	—	—	—	—	—	Shop Of Memories
1996	"Whenever I Fall"	—	—	—	—	—	—	—	—	—	—	—	Shop Of Memories
1996	"Old Town"	—	—	—	—	—	—	—	—	—	—	—	Roots Live
1996	"Howzat"	—	—	—	—	—	—	—	—	—	—	—	Roots Live
1997	"Harvest for the World"	—	—	—	—	—	—	—	—	—	—	—	Roots Live
2000	"Beautiful"	85	—	—	—	—	—	—	—	—	—	—	Everything and More
2000	"Everything"	—	—	—	—	—	—	—	—	—	—	—	Everything and More
2003	"One Love"	—	—	—	—	—	—	—	—	—	—	—	Stay
2016	"Maybe"	—	—	—	—	—	—	—	—	—	—	—	Singles only
2023	"Elke Dag / Every Day"	—	—	—	—	—	—	—	—	—	—	—	Singles only
"—" denotes releases that did not chart or were not released.

== See also ==
- List of Dutch people
