= Rich Man (Ten Sharp song) =

Single by Ten Sharp

from the album Under the Water-Line
- Released: March 1992
- Recorded: Studio Spitsbergen; Wisseloord Studios spring 1991
- Length: 4:19
- Label: Columbia
- Songwriter(s): Ten Sharp
- Producer(s): Michiel Hoogenboezem and Niels Hermes

Ten Sharp singles chronology
"When the Snow Falls" (1991)	"Rich Man" (1992)	"Dreamhome (Dream On)" (1993)

"Rich Man" is the ninth single from the Dutch group Ten Sharp, released in March 1992. The music is composed by Niels Hermes and the lyrics are written by Ton Groen. There was no official video shot for this single.

The B-side "You" (acoustic version) was recorded in the Bullet Sound Studios on February 4, 1992.

There are actually two versions of "Rich Man": The CD-version of Under the Water-Line plays the regular and best-known version, while the LP plays an early version. Notable on this version is the absence of Hugo de Bruin's guitar-part and another brass-arrangement. This version is half a minute longer.

== Track listings ==
7" single

1. "Rich Man" - 4:19
2. "Rich Man" (Instrumental version) - 4:03

CD-single

1. "Rich Man" - 4:19
2. "You" (Acoustic version) - 3:59
3. "All In Love Is Fair" - 3:57
4. "Rich Man" (Instrumental version) - 4:03

== Credits ==
- Vocals: Marcel Kapteijn
- Instruments and programming: Niels Hermes
- Additional drums on "Rich Man": Rob Jansen
- Horns on "Rich Man": Stylus Horns
- Photography by Roy Tee
- Produced by Michiel Hoogenboezem and Niels Hermes
- Recorded and mixed at Spitsbergen Studios and Wisseloord Studios
