= Strange Fruit (Trijntje Oosterhuis album) =

Live album by Trijntje Oosterhuis
- Released: 22 March 2004
- Recorded: Concertzaal (Tilburg); Stadsgehoorzaal (Leiden)
- Genre: Jazz
- Length: 74:01
- Label: Blue Note
- Producer: Dave Dexter

Trijntje Oosterhuis chronology
Trijntje Oosterhuis (2003)	Strange Fruit (2004)	See You As I Do (2005)

Strange Fruit is the second solo album by Trijntje Oosterhuis and was released on 22 March 2004 on Blue Note records. Trijntje's solo debut album was well received, and consisted mainly of pop ballads not reflective of her personal fondness for jazz.

During 2003 Trijntje made a tour with the Amsterdam Sinfonietta and the Houdini's playing covers of Billie Holiday and George Gershwin. Trijntje decided to record the 7 January 2003 concert in the Concertzaal in Tilburg and the 8 January 2003 concert in Stadsgehoorzaal in Leiden and release it as an album. The album was named after Billie Holiday's song "Strange Fruit."

Strange Fruit was very well received, received critical acclaim, with Trijntje gaining notoriety beyond The Netherlands. It was released outside the Netherlands under the artist name Traincha. The album has been certified two times Platinum and peaked at number 2 on the Dutch album charts.

== Track listing ==
#	Title	Length
1.	"Good Morning Heartache"	3:40
2.	"Am I Blue"	4:18
3.	"God Bless the Child"	6:28
4.	"All of Me"	4:44
5.	"Don't Explain"	4:35
6.	"Billie's Blues"	3:12
7.	"Strange Fruit"	3:54
8.	"What a Little Moonlight Can Do"	5:09
9.	"I Loves You Porgy"	6:33
10.	"They Can't Take That Away from Me"	4:49
11.	"The Man I Love"	5:42
12.	"Summertime"	6:29
13.	"I've Got Rhythm"	14:28

== Charts ==
=== Weekly charts ===
Chart (2004)	Peak position
Dutch Albums (Album Top 100)	2

=== Year-end charts ===
Chart (2004)	Position
Dutch Albums (Album Top 100)	24
