= Ronald Prent =

Dutch audio engineer

- Born: Ronald Prent
- Occupations: Mix engineer; recording engineer; record producer
- Known for: Working with: Rammstein; Simple Minds; Def Leppard; the Scorpions; Tina Turner; Mink DeVille; Freddie Mercury; Herbert Grönemeyer
- Spouse: Darcy Proper
- Musical career
- Genres: Hard rock; heavy metal; pop rock; punk rock

Ronald Prent is a Dutch mix engineer best known for pioneering in surround sound mixing and immersive audio. In 2019, Prent received a Grammy nomination in the category of “Best Immersive Audio Album” for the Engine-EarZ Experiment album Symbol. He has also worked with Rammstein, The Scorpions, Mink DeVille, Udo Lindenberg, Tina Turner, Def Leppard, Freddie Mercury, Queensryche, Celine Dion, Dire Straits, the Police, Thomas Anders and Herbert Grönemeyer.

== Career ==
Prent worked out of Galaxy Studios in Belgium, where he met mastering engineer Darcy Proper in 2005. Five years later, Prent and Proper moved to Holland where they rebuilt the Wisseloord Studios in the Netherlands.

In 2015, Prent formed Proper Prent Sound with his wife, mastering engineer Darcy Proper.

In 2019, Prent and Proper moved to U.S. and are based in Auburn, NY, where he continues to offer mixing and consultation services.

Ronald Prent has a particular passion for immersive audio and has made many presentations on the subject for professional sound panels including AES, Inside Blackbird Studio Mixing series, and many educational programs.

== Personal life ==
Prent is married to Darcy Proper.
