= Darcy Proper =

American mastering engineer

- Born: Upstate New York
- Education: NYU Bachelor of Music in Music Technology
- Occupation: Mastering Engineer
- Employer: Proper Prent Sound
- Spouse: Ronald Prent
- Awards: List of Grammy Award Nominations

Darcy Proper is an American mastering engineer based in Auburn, NY. In 2008, she became the first woman engineer to win a Grammy for the Best Surround Sound Album. To date, she has won four Grammy Awards and been nominated for eleven. She has mastered historical reissues for artists such as Johnny Cash, Billie Holiday, Louis Armstrong, and Frank Sinatra, and stereo releases for artists such as Steely Dan, The Eagles, Donald Fagen, and Porcupine Tree.

== Early life and education ==
Proper grew up in Upstate New York performing in choir, jazz ensemble, and school band. She was initially uncomfortable as a performer, preferring to listen to and analyze her parents' music collection. In addition to music, she excelled in math and science. These interests came to an intersection at age 14 when she attended a school event featuring student rock bands. She became interested in the mixing board used to run the sound system, introducing her to audio engineering.

At age seventeen, Proper attended New York University and was one of only three women in a class of 150 students admitted to NYU's Music Technology program. While studying in New York City, she had several internships and worked in a dance remix studio as an assistant studio technician. She graduated in 1990 with a Bachelor of Music in Music Technology.

== Career ==
After university, Proper first began working as an Assistant Studio Maintenance Technician for SoundWorks in Manhattan. In a few years, Proper took a job with Sony Classical Productions, Inc. as a Quality Control Engineer because of her ability to quickly learn the digital audio workstation Sonic Solutions. She eventually rose to a mastering position where she worked with clients on remastering historic pop standards and Broadway recordings. Seven years later, she became the Senior Mastering Engineer at Sony Music Studios and expanded her discography to include front-line releases and high-resolution surround sound mastering.

In 2005, Proper joined Galaxy Studios in Belgium as a Senior Mastering Engineer. There she met her future husband, Dutch recording and mixing engineer, Ronald Prent. Five years later, Proper and Prent moved to the Netherlands and worked to rebuild the renowned Wisseloord Studios, where Proper became Director of Mastering.

In 2015, Proper and Prent founded Proper Prent Sound, and Proper became Mastering Engineer of Darcy Proper Mastering. Her most recent projects involve mastering in immersive audio formats.

In 2019, she and Prent moved to the U.S. and are based in Auburn, NY.

== Grammy Awards ==
Proper has won four Grammy Awards from eleven nominations.

Year	Nominee/work	Award	Result
1999	Sony Music 100 Years: Soundtrack For A Century (Album)	Best Historical Album	Nominated
2001	Lady Day - The Complete Billie Holiday On Columbia 1933-1944	Best Historical Album	Won
2002	The Genius Of The Electric Guitar	Best Historical Album	Nominated
2005	You Ain't Talkin' To Me - Charlie Poole And The Roots Of Country Music	Best Historical Album	Nominated
2006	Morph The Cat	Best Surround Sound Album	Won
2007	Fear Of A Blank Planet	Best Surround Sound Album	Nominated
2010	The Incident	Best Surround Sound Album	Nominated
2012	Modern Cool	Best Surround Sound Album	Won
2013	Sixteen Sunsets	Best Surround Sound Album	Nominated
2017	Early Americans	Best Surround Sound Album	Won
2018	Symbol	Best Immersive Audio Album	Nominated
