= Trijntje Oosterhuis =

Dutch singer and songwriter (born 1973)

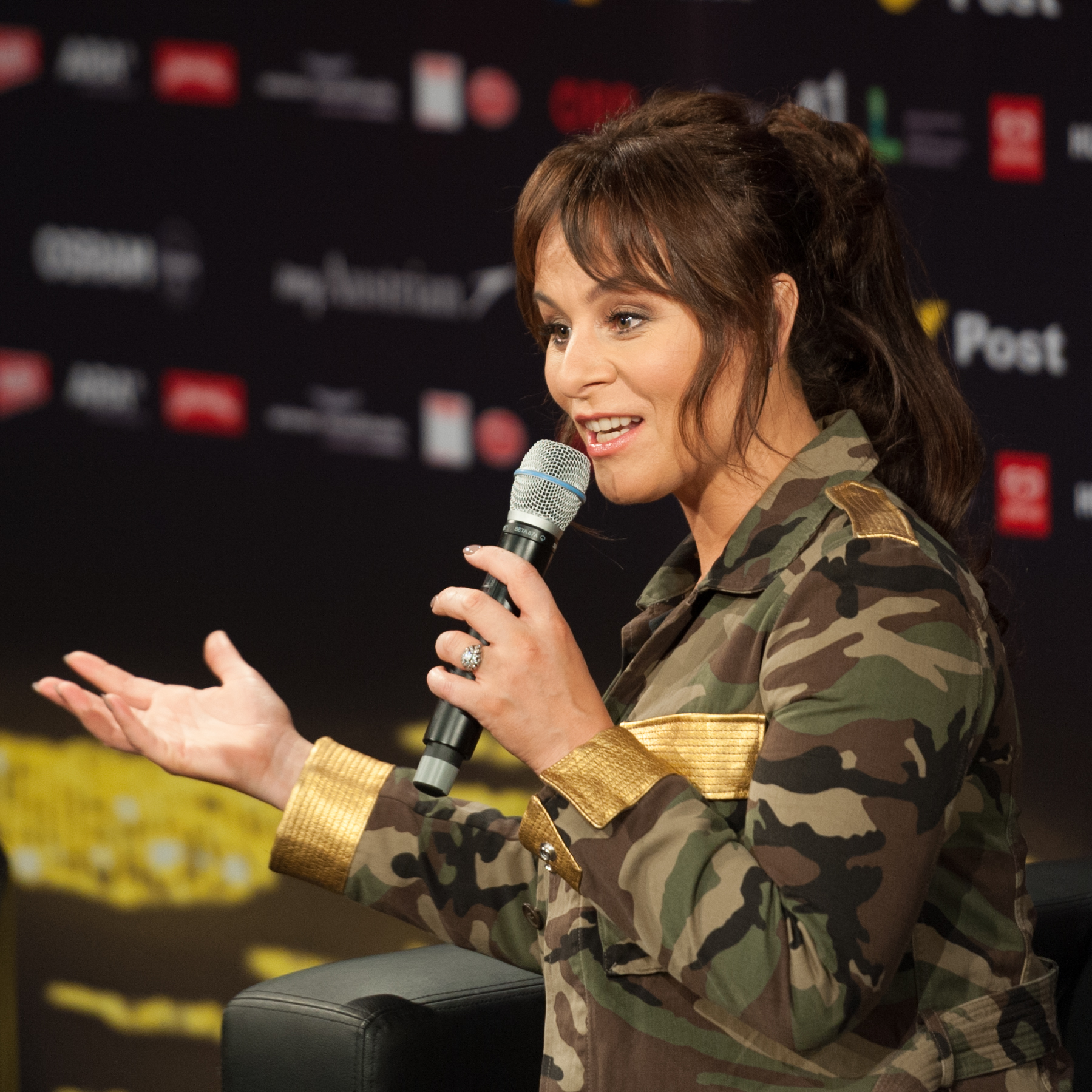
- Trijntje Oosterhuis in 2015

Background information
- Also known as: Trijntje
- Born: Judith Katrijntje Oosterhuis; 5 February 1973 (age 53); Amsterdam, Netherlands
- Genres: Pop; jazz
- Occupations: Singer; songwriter
- Instrument: Vocals
- Years active: 1990–present
- Labels: EMI; Blue Note
- Formerly of: Total Touch
- Website: trijntje.nl

Judith Katrijntje "Trijntje" Oosterhuis (Dutch pronunciation: [(ˈjydɪt kaː)ˈtrɛiɲtɕə ˈʔoːstərɦœys]; born 5 February 1973) is a Dutch singer and songwriter. She formed the band Total Touch in 1990 with her brother Tjeerd Oosterhuis before she started as a solo singer. She represented the Netherlands in the Eurovision Song Contest 2015 with the song "Walk Along", placing fourteen in the first semi-final with 33 points and winning the Barbara Dex Award of the year.

== Early life ==
Judith Katrijntje Oosterhuis was born on 5 February 1973 in Amsterdam, Netherlands. She is the daughter of theologian and former Catholic priest Huub Oosterhuis and violinist Jozefien Melief of the Amsterdam Promenade Orchestra. Her older brother is Tjeerd Oosterhuis (born 1971).

== Total Touch ==
In 1990, Oosterhuis formed the band Total Touch with her brother Tjeerd and, in 1991, they participated in the Grote Prijs van Nederland, the most important amateur musician contest in the Netherlands. Trijntje got the opportunity to tour with Candy Dulfer in 1994 after collaborating with her on the album Big Girl. Originally the tour was supposed to last six weeks; however, it became a two-year tour around the world.

Total Touch was offered a record deal in 1995 and their debut album Total Touch was released in 1997. The first single, "Touch Me There", became a summer hit and went Platinum, selling over 100,000 copies in its first month - despite only peaking the Dutch charts at number 14. The next album This Way became their first number-one album and was equally successful, although the album was not well known internationally. In 1999, they took a small break, and Trijntje Oosterhuis released a live album with covers of Stevie Wonder.

== Solo career ==
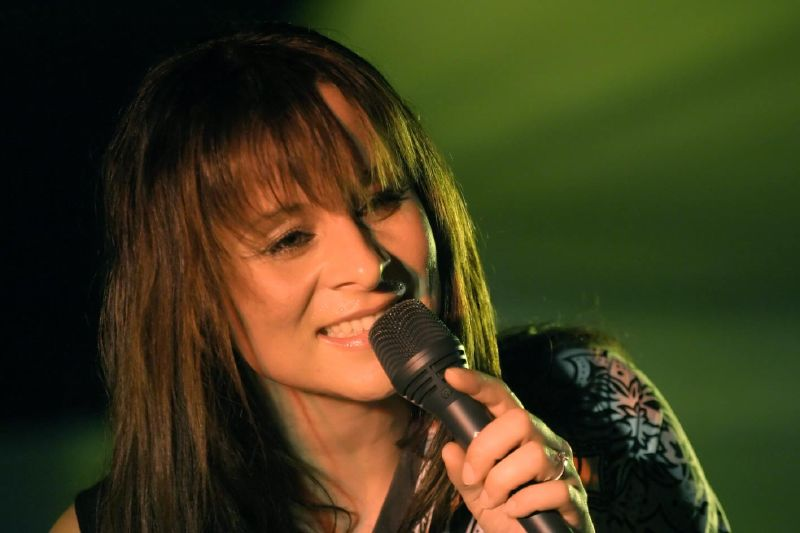
Oosterhuis performing in c. 2008

In 2001, Total Touch decided to go their separate ways, with Tjeerd wanting to focus on production and songwriting and Trijntje wanting to launch her solo career.

Oosterhuis's debut solo album, Trijntje Oosterhuis, consisted mainly of ballads and presented her as a diva. Trijntje personally has a fondness for jazz instead of pop ballads, and, in 2004, she therefore signed a record deal with Blue Note and released the live album Strange Fruit, consisting of Billie Holiday and George Gershwin covers. The album received critical acclaim, and Trijntje finally managed to achieve fame beyond her home country.

In 2004 Trijntje gave birth to a son. In 2006 she gave birth to a second son. Her second jazz album called The Look of Love (Burt Bacharach Songbook) was recorded with Burt Bacharach, who plays the piano on two tracks and was released on 20 November 2006. The new album was certified Platinum on the day of release, for having shipped more than 70,000 copies. In December 2006 Trijntje toured with the Metropole Orchestra performing covers of Burt Bacharach and Christmas songs.

In 2007, she released a second volume of her collaboration with Burt Bacharach entitled Who'll Speak for Love, with Bacharach again playing piano on three tracks. In 2008, she released a CD and DVD of an acoustic concert performance with guitarist Leonardo Amuedo, entitled Ken Je Mij (Do You Know Me).

In September 2008, she was one of the special guests at the Symphonica in Rosso concert in Arnhem, starring Lionel Richie. During this concert she sang the duet "Face in the Crowd" with Richie, which performance is included in Richie's album Just Go.

In 2009 and 2010, her song "What the World Needs Now" was the theme for Brazilian soap opera Viver a Vida made by Rede Globo.

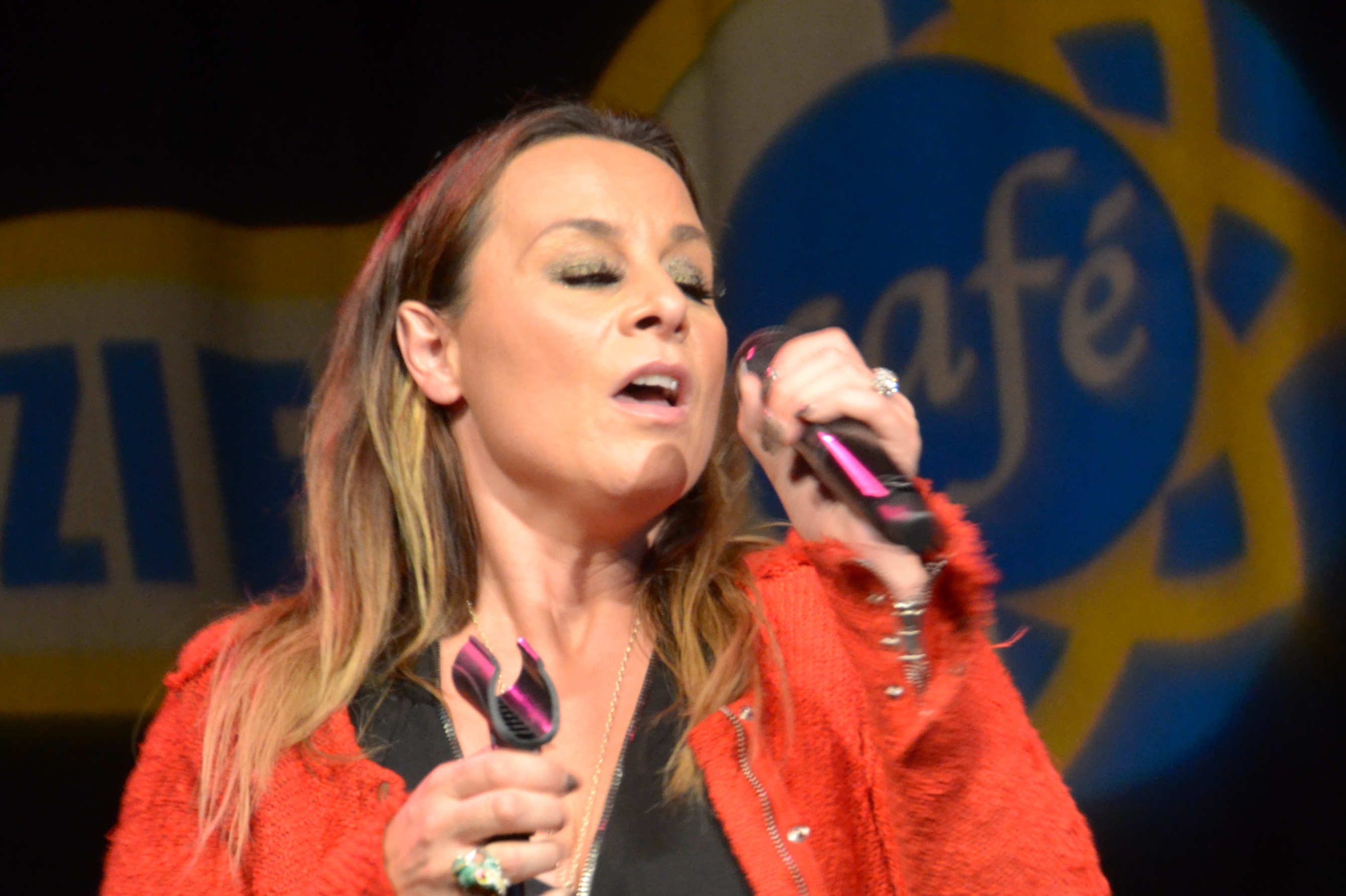
Oosterhuis performing in 2012

In early 2011, Oosterhuis released the album Sundays in New York. The CD was given away free to lucky readers of the Saturday 15 January 2011 edition of the Dutch newspaper AD.

A year later, in January 2012, Dutch singer Anouk made two videos of her and Trijntje working together in a studio, available through Twitter and Facebook. Initial assumptions were made that Anouk and Trijntje were recording a duet for Trijntje's next album. Soon after, it was announced that Anouk was writing songs for the album and producing it. The new album, named Wrecks We Adore, was officially released on 13 April 2012. In 2012, Oosterhuis replaced Angela Groothuizen as a coach on the third season of The Voice of Holland alongside Nick & Simon, Roel van Velzen and Marco Borsato. Her final contestant, Leona Philippo, reached the final and won. Oosterhuis remained on the show until the end of the fifth season in 2014.

Trijntje Oosterhuis represented the Netherlands at the Eurovision Song Contest 2015 with the song "Walk Along". However, Oosterhuis failed to qualify for the final.

In 2015 she gave birth to her third child, a daughter.

Between 2012 and 2017, Oosterhuis was a member of Ladies of Soul, a supergroup completed by Candy Dulfer, Glennis Grace and sisters-in-law Berget Lewis and Edsilia Rombley. They staged annual arena-shows since February 2014 performing collective and solo-tracks as well as cover-versions. In June 2017 Oosterhuis announced her departure from the Ladies of Soul to focus on her solo-career; she did return as a special guest during the 5th anniversary-shows on 23 and 24 March 2018.

In September 2017, Oosterhuis released the Dutch-language covers-album Leven van de liefde (Living off love).

In September 2018, Oosterhuis was part of the Dutch television programme "Beste Zangers".

In March 2019, Oosterhuis released the first single from her forthcoming album Dit is voor mij (This is for me); the same month she played a 25th anniversary-concert in a sold out Ziggo Dome. Amidst a summer-tour of festivals and special concerts, Oosterhuis appeared at North Sea Jazz Festival. These dates were followed by a club tour.

In 2020, Oosterhuis was to play the role of Mary in that year's edition of The Passion; it was cancelled due to the coronavirus. In the summer of 2020 she appeared as a panel-judge on the SBS6 talent-show We Want More; the selection-rounds were taped beforehand. Oosterhuis was a contestant in the 2022 season of the television show Het Perfecte Plaatje.

== Discography ==
- Strange Fruit (2004)
- See You as I Do (2005)
- The Look of Love (2006)

Achievements
Preceded by The Common Linnets with "Calm After the Storm"	Netherlands in the Eurovision Song Contest; 2015; With: "Walk Along"	Succeeded by Douwe Bob with "Slow Down"
