= Wisseloord Studios =

Recording studio in Hilversum, the Netherlands

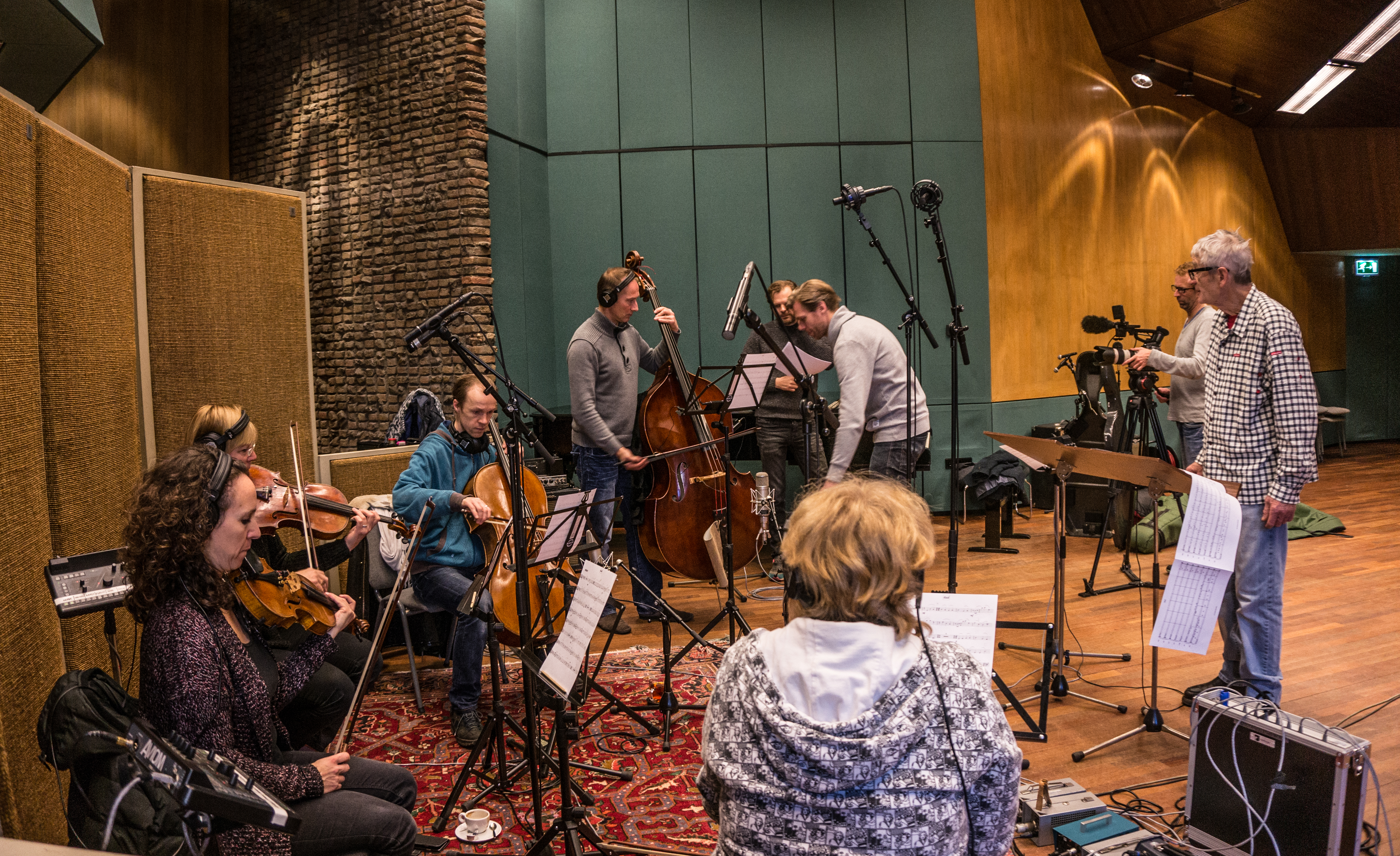
Recording session at Wisseloord Studios

The Wisseloord Studio is a recording studio in Hilversum, Netherlands. It was officially opened on 19 January 1978 by Prince Claus. The studios were founded by electronics company Philips, to enable their PolyGram artists to record in a professional environment. Initially, there were three studios, but this was expanded to five.

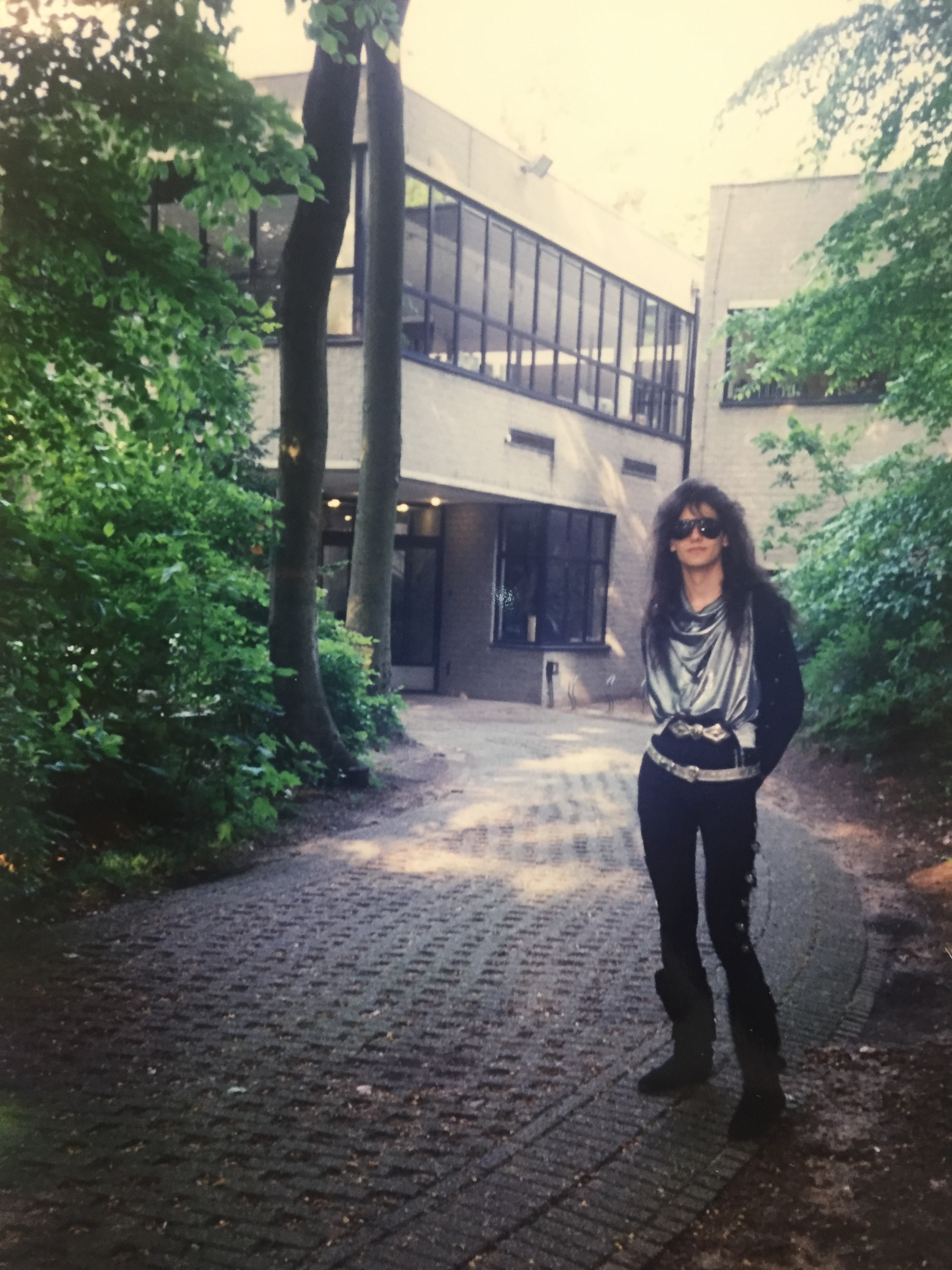
Dutch singer Valensia at Wisseloord Studios in 1992

In the early days, the studios were mainly used by Dutch artists. Very quickly, international musicians such as Elton John, Scorpions, Orchestral Manoeuvres in the Dark, Def Leppard, Iron Maiden, the Police, Tina Turner, Electric Light Orchestra, U2, Chris Brown and NAS have used the facilities.

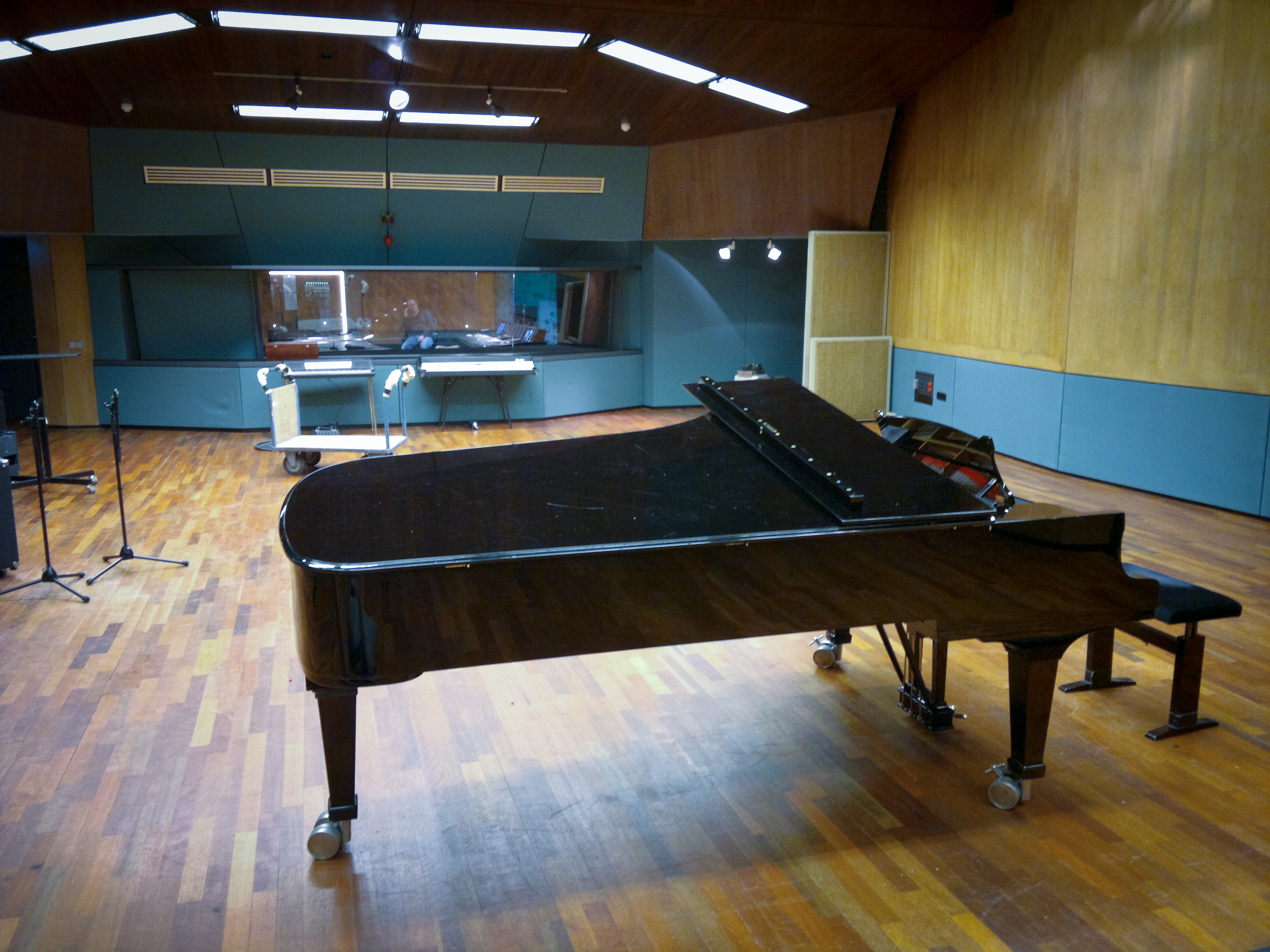
Studio interior

Beginning in 2010, a new management team worked with designer and acoustician Jochen Veith to begin a major refit of the studios. The new team, had been envisioning a new studio model with two identical control rooms, so it would be easier to move between them. As part of this, major components have been updated, including the integration of new mixing consoles from Automated Processes, Inc. (Vision) and Avid (Euphonix System5). The studios also include a PMC active monitoring system.

According to Andrew Davie of the band Bear's Den, "The main rooms at Wisseloord are these enormous, spaceship-style studios."

In 2017, the studios took a big turn in their history under the lead of French music producer and co-owner Malik Berrabah who managed to transform the facilities into one of the most important music hubs in Europe. Since then, artists from all around the world have travelled to the Netherlands for residency programs, writing camps, and sessions to collaborate with other international artists.

In 2020, the studio saw the launch of the Wisseloord Academy, an online and in-person series of music production courses. Courses vary from engineering, song writing, and creative development.

== Artists who recorded at Wisseloord ==
- 3 Doors Down
- 50 Cent
- Akon
- Alain Clark
- Ali Campbell
- Alceu Valença
- André Rieu
- André van Duin
- Andrea Bocelli
- Anouk
- Axxis
- BZN
- Barclay James Harvest
- Bastiaan Ragas
- The Beautiful South
- Benny Neyman
- Benny Sings
- BLØF
- Boudewijn de Groot
- Cactus World News
- Casiopea
- Channel Zero
- Cristina Deutekom
- Clark Datchler
- Clouseau
- Danger Danger
- Dave Edmunds
- David Knopfler
- David Lee Roth
- David Soul
- David Sylvian
- De Dijk
- Def Leppard
- Dieter Falk
- D-A-D
- Do
- Dr. Hook & The Medicine Show
- Duncan Laurence
- Edsilia Rombley
- Elton John
- Electric Eel Shock
- Electric Light Orchestra
- Elvis Costello and the Attractions
- Epica
- Erik Hulzebosch
- Falco
- Foo Fighters
- Francis Goya
- Frank Boeijen
- Frankie Goes To Hollywood
- Gerard Joling
- Gert Bettens
- Gheorghe Zamfir
- Glennis Grace
- Gloria Estefan
- Go West
- Gordon
- Gotthard
- Greyson Chance
- HammerFall
- Hartmann
- Harry Sacksioni
- Herman Brood
- Herman van Veen
- Hollywood Undead
- Imperiet
- Indochine
- Iron Maiden
- James Blunt
- Jan Smit
- Jeff Lynne
- Jessica Sanchez
- Jett Rebel
- Jo Lemaire
- Judas Priest
- Kane
- Kayak
- Killing Joke
- Kingdom Come
- Klaus Hoffmann
- Klaus Lage Band
- Krezip
- Laura Fygi
- Lee Towers
- Lionel Richie
- Loïs Lane
- Lucie Silvas
- Luv'
- Magnum
- Manowar
- Marque
- Metallica
- Michael Jackson
- Mick Jagger
- Mike Batt
- Miriam Makeba
- Misia
- Mister E
- Mister E & The Mysteries
- Noa
- The Nits
- Noordkaap
- Normaal
- Orchestral Manoeuvres in the Dark
- Opus
- Paco de Lucía
- Paul de Leeuw
- Paul McCartney
- Paul Young
- Peter Maffay
- Peter Sarstedt
- Phil Collins
- The Police
- Quadrophonia
- Queensrÿche
- Racoon
- Raehann Bryce-Davis
- Rammstein
- Raymond van het Groenewoud
- René Froger
- Robert Palmer
- Robin S.
- Rood Adeo
- Ruth Jacott
- Sade
- Salada de Frutas
- Sarah Bettens
- Saxon
- Scorpions
- Shirley Bassey
- Simple Minds
- Simply Red
- Sinéad O'Connor
- Sopa de Cabra
- Soulsister
- Spider Murphy Gang
- Status Quo
- Stereophonics
- Sting
- Technotronic
- Telly Savalas
- Ten Sharp
- The Gathering
- The Cranberries
- The Sisters of Mercy
- The Three Degrees
- The Stranglers
- The Undertones
- Thomas Anders
- Tina Turner
- Tony Carey
- Toots Thielemans
- T'Pau
- Treat
- Trijntje Oosterhuis
- U2
- UB40
- Valensia
- Van Dik Hout
- Victory
- Willy DeVille
- Within Temptation
- Chew Fu
- Youp van 't Hek
- Zucchero
- Zinatra
