= Miho Hazama =

Japanese jazz composer and arranger (1986-)

- Born: 1986 (age 39–40); Tokyo, Japan
- Genres: Jazz
- Occupations: Composer; arranger; conductor
- Years active: 2012–present
- Labels: Verve; Sunnyside
- Website: jamrice.co.jp/miho/index.html

Miho Hazama (挾間 美帆, Hazama Miho) is a Tokyo-born composer, conductor and jazz musician, based in New York City.

== Early life and career ==
Miho Hazama started to play electric keyboard at the age of three at Yamaha Music Foundation's School, and received attention when she proceeded to the final of Junior Electone Concours '96 at the age of ten.

Hazama attended and graduated the Kunitachi College of Music, where she studied classical composition from Masakazu Natsuda and Kazunori Maruyama. While in the college, she was active in composition and arrangement, and provided her works to Yōsuke Yamashita, Tokyo Philharmonic Orchestra, Hyogo Performing Arts Center Orchestra, Tokyo Kosei Wind Orchestra, Siena Wind Orchestra and Yamaha Symphonic Band.

In 2010, Hazama moved to New York City to study jazz composition in master's program of Manhattan School of Music (MSM). While attending, she studied under Jim McNeely, and received 2011 ASCAP Foundation Young Jazz Composer Awards. Hazama obtained her master's degree in May 2012 and recorded her first album Journey to Journey in July 2012. Yōsuke Yamashita produced her professional debut event in January 2013, held at Tokyo Opera City Tower.

In May 2017, Hazama became a composer in residence of the Siena Wind Orchestra. She was the 2018-2019 composer of the year for the Orchestra Ensemble Kanazawa.

In June 2019, Hazama was appointed as chief conductor of the Danish Radio Big Band. She is also the Associate Artistic Director of The New York Jazzharmonic, and in August 2020, she became a permanent guest conductor of The Metropole Orkest.

In August 2026, Hazama conducted the BBC Concert Orchestra and soloist Ambrose Akinmusire for the BBC Proms Miles Davis Centenary concert at the Royal Albert Hall.

== Awards and honors ==
- 2011: ASCAP Foundation Young Jazz Composer Awards
- 2013: Jazz Japan Award 2012: "Jazz Japan Album of the year / Rising star category" for Journey to Journey
- 2014: 24th (FY 2013) Idemitsu Music Award
- 2015: BMI 16th Annual Charlie Parker Jazz Composition Prize for “Somnambulant"
- 2016: DownBeat magazine: “25 for the Future”

== Discography ==
=== As band leader ===
- Journey to Journey with m_unit (Universal Music/Verve, 2012; Sunnyside, 2013)
- Time River with m_unit (Verve & Sunnyside, 2015)
- The Monk: Live at Bimhuis with Metropole Orkest Big Band (Verve & Sunnyside, 2018)
- Dancer in Nowhere with m_unit (Verve, 2018; Sunnyside, 2019)
- Marius Neset, Tributes with Danish Radio Big Band (ACT Music, 2020)
- Imaginary Visions featuring The Danish Radio Big Band (Edition, 2021)
- Beyond Orbits with m_unit (Edition, 2023)
- The Babylon Hotel with Danish Radio Big Band, Danish National Symphony Orchestra and Moka Efti Orchestra (EuroArts Music International, 2024)[CD, Blu-ray]
- Live Life This Day: Celebrating Thad Jones with Danish Radio Big Band and Danish National Symphony Orchestra (Edition, 2025)
- Frames with Danish Radio Big Band (Edition, 2026)

=== Selective compositions and arrangements ===
- Yōsuke Yamashita, Yutaka Sado "Yōsuke Yamashita: Piano Concerto No.3 EXPLORER" orchestration in Explorer×Sudden Fiction (Avex Classics, 2008) - with Tokyo Philharmonic Orchestra
- Shirō Sagisu, Soundtrack orchestration of Evangelion: 3.0 You Can (Not) Redo (Starchild, 2012)
- Ryuichi Sakamoto, "0322 C# Minor", "Trace", "After All" arrangements in Playing The Orchestra 2013, (commmons, 2013)
- Yōsuke Yamashita, Yutaka Sado and Siena Wind Orchestra, "Mr.O" composition, "Yōsuke Yamashita: Piano Concerto No.1 ENCOUNTER for Improviser, 4th movement" arrangement in Rhapsody in Blue (Avex Classics, 2014)
- Junko Onishi, "The Intersection" composition in Tea Times (Sony/Taboo, 2016)
- Junko Onishi, "Willow Song (from Otello)" arrangement in Very Special (Sony/Taboo, 2017)
- Raul Midón, "Everyone Deserves A Second Chance" arrangement in If You Really Want (Artistry Music, 2018)
- Miki Imai, "Shiawase-ni-naritai (幸せになりたい)" arrangement in Classic Ivory 35th Anniversary Orchestral Best (Universal Music Japan, 2020)
- Christian Sands, "Be Water II" arrangement in Be Water (Mack Avenue, 2020)
