= Malika Tirolien =

Guadeloupean-Canadian singer-songwriter (born 198)

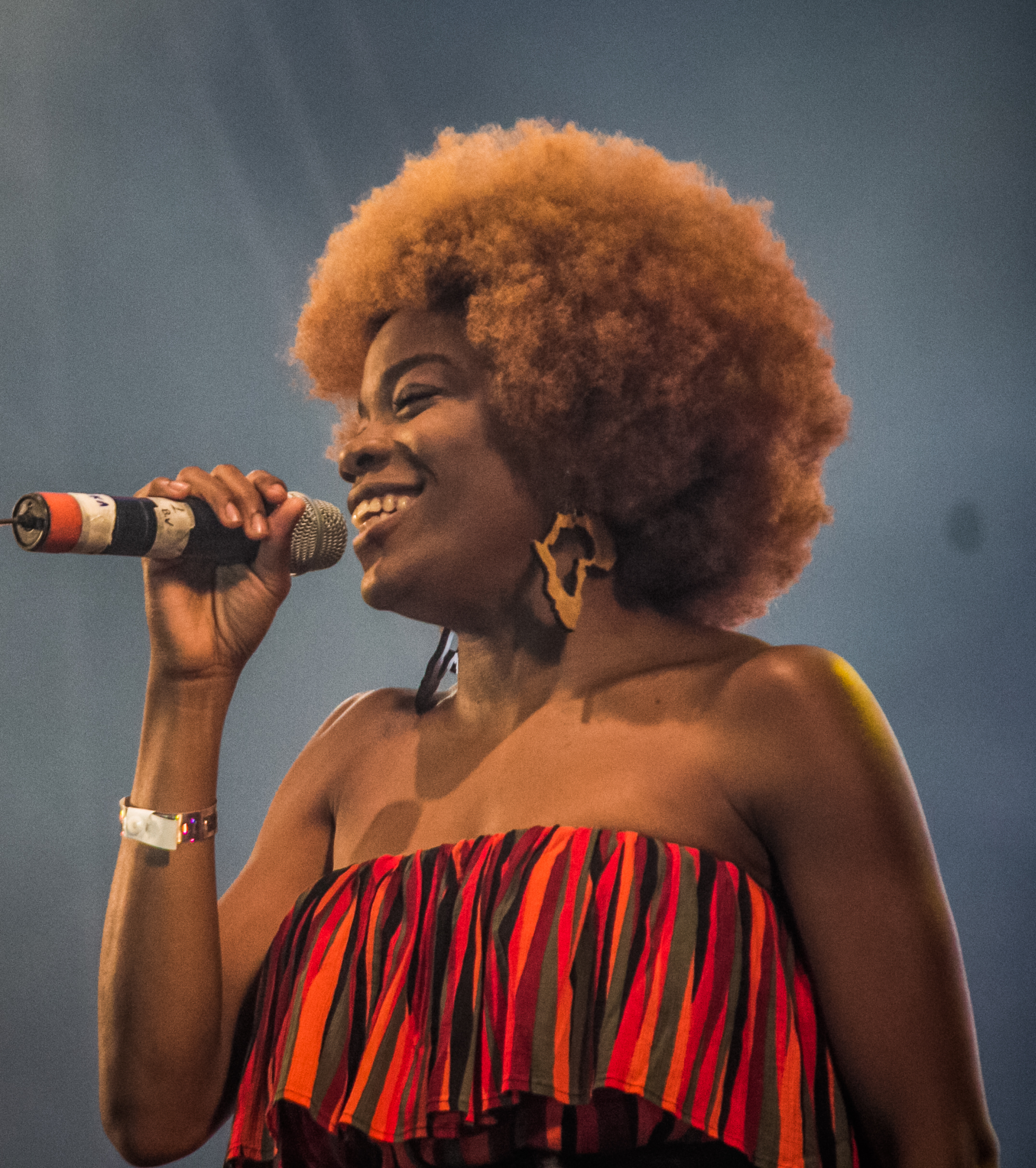
- Tirolien performing in Brasília, Brazil (2014)

Background information
- Born: Malika Jael Tirolien; 26 June 1983 (age 43); Marie-Galante, Guadeloupe
- Occupations: Singer, songwriter
- Years active: 2005–present
- Label: Ropeadope
- Website: malikatirolien.com

Malika Tirolien (born 26 June 1983) is a Guadeloupean-Canadian singer-songwriter and pianist. She sang on the Grammy Award winning album Family Dinner – Volume 1 by Snarky Puppy. She is based in Montreal.

== Biography ==
Malika Tirolien was born in Marie-Galante, Guadeloupe, and grew up in an artistic environment. Her grandmother played the piano, her grandfather was the poet Guy Tirolien and her father, a history teacher, was a self-taught multi-instrumentalist. Tirolien showed interest for music and singing at a very young age; noticing this, her parents signed her up for piano lessons. She recorded her first studio song when she was 8, accompanying her father's band. As a teenager she was already very involved with singing and cites Michael Jackson as one of her biggest influences at the time.

In 2001, aged 18, Tirolien moved to Canada to study music at the Université de Montréal. In 2005, after graduating with a B.A. in jazz interpretation, Tirolien spent a few months in France. On her return to Montreal, she watched a presentation of the Kalmunity Vibe Collective and decided to join them. With other members of the collective, Tirolien formed the band Groundfood.

Between 2012 and 2013, Tirolien sang the lead role in Cirque du Soleil's show La Nouba in Orlando, Florida. Her performance caught the attention of Michael League, group leader of the American band Snarky Puppy, and her band Groundfood was invited to open for Snarky Puppy in a presentation in New York. After that, she and League started a close collaboration. He invited her to participate in Snarky Puppy's album Family Dinner – Volume 1 with two songs, "Sew" and "I'm Not the One". The album was released in September 2013.

In June 2014, Tirolien launched her debut solo album, Sur La Voie Ensoleillée ("On the High/Sunny Road"), with guest participations of Erik Hove and Groundfood, among others. In July, she went on an international tour with Snarky Puppy. They participated in three major European festivals: the Nice Jazz Festival (France) on 9 July, the Lugano Jazz Festival (Switzerland) on 11 July, and the North Sea Jazz Festival of Rotterdam (Low Countries) on 12 July. She then headed to South America, where she performed in Festival Latinidades, in Brasília (Brazil) on 26 July. In September 2015, Tirolien returned to Brazil to perform at the Jazz Ahead festival in Rio de Janeiro.

In October 2016, Tirolien went on an Asian tour that included presentations in China (Beijing) and India (Delhi, Pune, Bangalore and Calcutta). The tour extended to the Americas (Canada, United States, French West Indies, and Brazil).

In 2015, Michael League invited Tirolien to become the lead singer of a new group, Bokanté ("Exchange", in Guadeloupean Creole). Their debut album Strange Circles was released in June 2017, and the band went on a European tour in the following month. They collaborated with the Metropole Orkest on their second album What Heat, which was released in September 2018 and was nominated for Best World Music Album in the 62nd Annual Grammy Awards.

== Discography ==
=== With Groundfood ===
- MixTape Volume 1 (October 2010)
- MixTape Volume 2 – Live at Nectar's (March 2013)
- Chew Before You Swallow (May 2014)

=== With Bokanté ===
- Jou Kè Ouvè (single, January 2017)
- Strange Circles (June 2017)
- What Heat (September 2018)

=== Solo albums ===
- Sur La Voie Ensoleillée (July 2014)
- Higher (February 2021)

=== As guest ===
- Jocelyn Ménard Jazz Group – Terre Mère (December 2012)
- Vox Sambou – Dyasporafriken (April 2013)
- Snarky Puppy – Family Dinner – Volume 1 (September 2013)
- Elephant Stone – The Three Poisons (October 2014)
- Kenyon – Le Choix Des Armes (November 2015)
- Elephant Stone – Ship of Fools (September 2016)
