= Alex Brown (musician) =

American pianist and composer (born 1987)

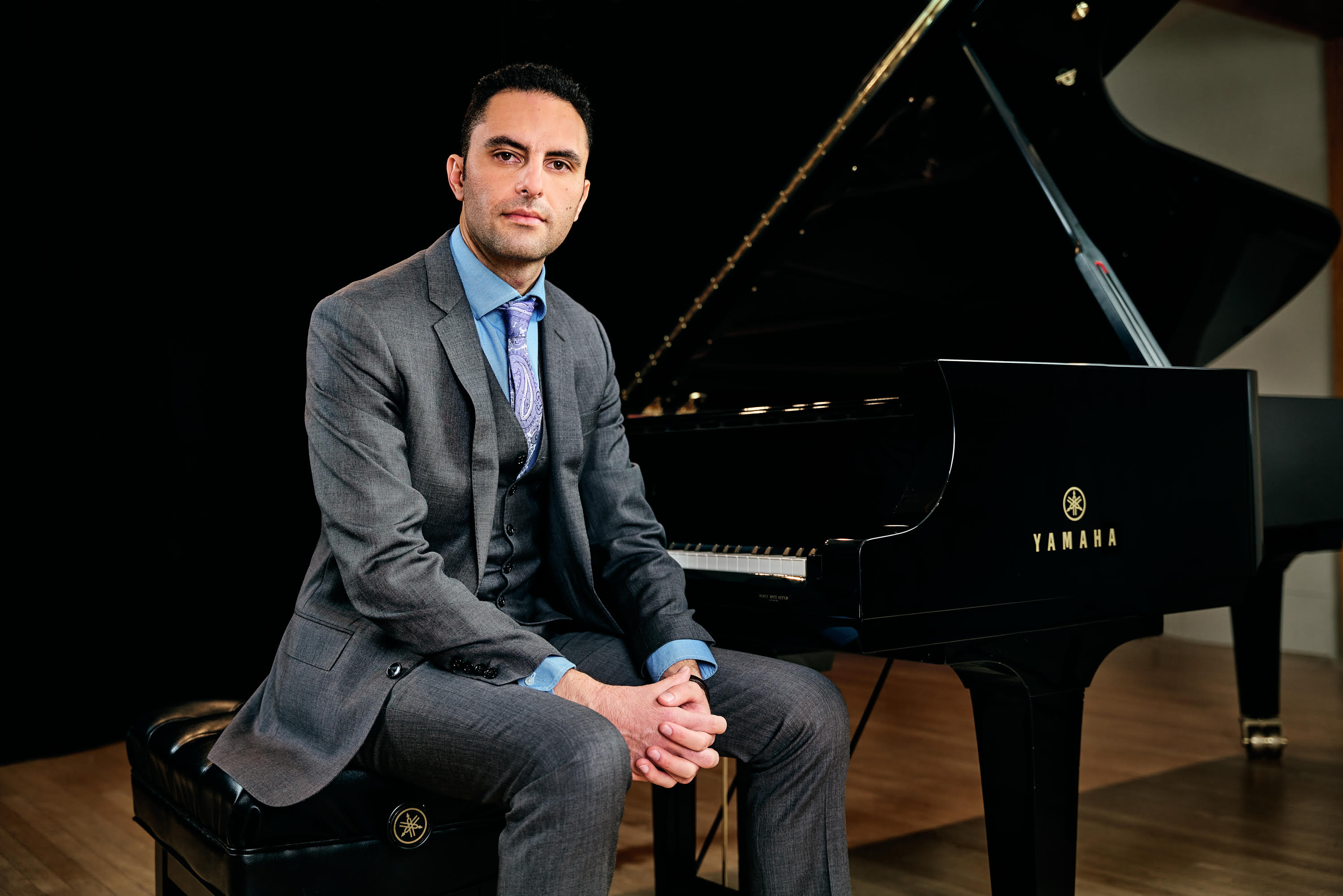
- Alex Brown by Rob Davidson at Yamaha Artist Services, NYC, 2021

Background information
- Born: 1987 (age 38–39); Columbia, Maryland, U.S.
- Genres: Jazz, Classical, Film music
- Occupation: Musician
- Instrument: Piano
- Website: www.alexbrownmusic.com

Alex Brown (born 1987) is an American pianist and composer known for weaving elements of classical, rhythm and blues, hip-hop, Afro-Caribbean music, and Brazilian jazz.

Brown has collaborated with artists that include Valerie Coleman, Sean Jones, Cho-Liang Lin, Yo-Yo Ma, Armando Manzanero, Christian McBride, the New York Voices, David Sanchez, David Shifrin, Chris Thile, Warren Wolf, and Miguel Zenón. He has been a member of Paquito D'Rivera's group since 2007. He has performed at venues including the Lincoln Center Rose Theater, The Blue Note, The Kennedy Center, and The Hollywood Bowl. He won a Grammy Award for Best Classical Compendium as part of his collaboration with composer Jeff Scott and Imani Winds for “Passion For Bach and Coltrane” in 2024.

He is on the faculty at Peabody Institute Conservatory of Music in Baltimore, Maryland.

== Early life and education ==
Brown was born in Columbia, Maryland. His brother Zach Brown, is a producer, audio engineer, and bassist.

He attended The New England Conservatory of Music, majoring in Jazz Studies and graduating in 2009. During that time, he studied with Danilo Pérez and Charlie Banacos. He obtained a masters in Studio/Jazz Composition at the University of Miami, Frost School of Music, where he studied with Gary Lindsay, Shelly Berg, and Carlos Rafael Rivera. In 2009, he moved to New York City.

== Discography ==
=== As lead artist ===
Title	Label	Release date	Personnel
Pianist	Sunnyside Records	2010	Paquito D’Rivera (saxophone and clarinet), Vivek Patel (flugelhorn), Warren Wolf (marimba), Ben Williams (bass), Eric Doob (drums), Pedrito Martinez (percussion)
The Dark Fire Sessions	Self-released	2021	Matthew Stevens (guitar), Zach Brown (acoustic and electric bass) Eric Doob, (drums), Paulo Stagnaro (percussion), Eric Kurimski (acoustic guitar), Lucas Apostoleris (steel guitar), Franco Pinna (bombo leguero), Sebastian Natal (candombe percussion), Sergio Martinez (cajon and flamenco percussion)
Island to Island (with Victor Provost)	Self-released	2025	Victor Provost (steel pan), Reuben Rogers (bass), Eric Doob (drums), Ludwig Afonso, (drums), Mark Walker (drums), Paulo Stagnaro (percussion), Jorge Glem (cuatro), Alexis Soto (maracas), Warren Wolf (marimba), Sean Jones (trumpet)

=== As contributor ===
- Paquito D’Rivera Quintet / Sabine Meyer, Jazz Clazz (2009), Timba Records, pianist – Grammy nominated
- Imani Winds, Terra Incognita (2010), E1 Entertainment, pianist
- Alondra de la Parra / Philharmonic Orchestra of the Americas, Mi Alma Mexicana / My Mexican Soul (2010), Sony Classical, pianist
- Omar Thomas Large Ensemble, I Am (2013), Sound Silence Records, pianist
- Paquito D’Rivera, Jazz Meets the Classics (2014), Sunnyside Records, pianist and composer – Latin GRAMMY award winner
- Omar Thomas Large Ensemble, We Will Know (2014), Sound Silence Records, pianist
- Jeff Scott, The Gift of Life-The Urban Classical Music Project, Vol 1. (2015), self-released, pianist
- Miho Hazama m_unit, Time River, Sunnyside Records (2015), pianist
- Paquito D’Rivera / Armando Manzanero, Paquito & Manzanero (2015), pianist and principal arranger
- Victor Provost, Bright Eyes (2017), Sunnyside Records, pianist
- Haerim Elizabeth Lee, My Time is Now (2019), Innova, pianist and arranger
- Brian Lynch Big Band, The Omni-American Book Club (2019), Hollistic MusicWorks, pianist – GRAMMY award winner
- Chad LB Virtual Big Band, Quarantine Standards (2020), Sound Frame, pianist
- Dafnis Prieto, Transparency (2020), Dafnison Music, pianist
- Chad Lefkowitz-Brown, Open World (2021), La Reserve Records, arranger
- Michael Torke, Psalms and Canticles (2021), self-released, pianist
- Brian Lynch, Songbook, Vol 2.: Dance the Way you Want To (2022), Hollistic MusicWorks, pianist
- Imani Winds / Harlem Quartet / A.B. Spellman / Alex Brown / Edward Perez / Neal Smith, Passion for Bach and Coltrane (2023), self-released, pianist – GRAMMY award winner
- Warren Wolf, History of the Vibraphone (2024), Cellar Live, pianist
- Andre Nickatina, Reimagined by Symphony (2024), I-Khan, pianist and arranger
- Omar Thomas Large Ensemble, Griot Songs (2025), self-released, pianist
- Chicago Jazz Orchestra, Bobby Broom - More Amor: A Tribute to Wes Montgomery (2025), arranger

== Awards and nominations ==
- Grammy Award for Best Classical Compendium, Passion For Bach and Coltrane, 2024, Jeff Scott with Imani Winds, A. B. Spellman, Harlem Quartet, Alex Brown, Edward Perez, and Neal Smith
- Nomination, Grammy Award for Best Latin Jazz Album, Transparency, 2022
- Nomination, Grammy Award for Best Classical Crossover Album, Jazz-Clazz, 2010
