= Family Dinner – Volume 1 =

Studio album by Snarky Puppy
- Released: 2013
- Recorded: March 8–9, 2013
- Studios: Shaftman Performance Hall, Roanoke, Virginia
- Genre: Jazz fusion
- Length: 45:04
- Label: Ropeadope

Snarky Puppy chronology
Amkeni (2013)	Family Dinner – Volume 1 (2013)	We Like It Here (2014)

Family Dinner – Volume 1 is an album by the American jazz fusion group Snarky Puppy that was released in 2013.

On January 26, 2014, Snarky Puppy and Lalah Hathaway won a Grammy Award in the Best R&B Performance category for their rendition of the Brenda Russell song "Something".

The album was recorded and filmed in the Shaftman Performance Hall at Jefferson Center in Roanoke, Virginia in March 2013. The intent was to draw attention to the Jefferson Center's non-profit arts organization. A portion of sales supports the Music Lab at Jefferson Center.

== Track listing ==
No.	Title	Writer(s)	Arranger(s)	Length
1.	"Free Your Dreams" (with Chantae Cann)	Cann	League	4:46
2.	"Gone Under" (with Shayna Steele)	Steele, David Cook	League	5:46
3.	"Deep" (with N'Dambi)	N'Dambi, Madukwu Chinwah	League, Maher	5:13
4.	"Amour T'es La" (with Magda Giannikou)	Giannikou	Giannikou, Snarky Puppy	4:22
5.	"Something" (with Lalah Hathaway)	David Foster, Brenda Russell	League, Searight, Henry, Laurance, Lettieri	7:35
6.	"Too Hot to Last" (with Lucy Woodward)	League, Woodward	League	4:44
7.	"Turned Away" (with Tony Scherr)	Tony Scherr	League, Scherr	7:22
8.	"I'm Not the One" (with Malika Tirolien)	Tirolien, Frederick Varre	League, Tirolien	5:16
Total length:				45:04

=== DVD bonus tracks ===
(On the DVD set, Track #8 on the LP is the first track on the second disc.)

No.	Title	Writer(s)	Arranger(s)	Length
9.	"Da Da N'Da" (with Chantae Cann)	Cann, Anthony Dixon	League, Cann	5:28
10.	"Ase Me Na Bo" (with Magda Giannikou)	Giannikou	League, Giannikou	4:47
11.	"Black Sheep" (with Tony Scherr)	Scherr	League, Scherr	8:10
12.	"He Got Away" (with Lucy Woodward)	Woodward	League, Woodward	5:20
13.	"Sew" (with Malika Tirolien)	Tirolien	League, Tirolien	4:48
14.	"Only Love" (with Judi Jackson)	Jackson	League	4:02
15.	"I'll Do Me" (with Jayna Brown)	Brown, League	League, Searight, Lettieri, Laurance	6:13
Total length:				38:48

== Personnel ==
Snarky Puppy

- Michael League – bass guitar, keyboard bass, acoustic guitar, baritone guitar
- Mike Maher – trumpet, flugelhorn
- Jay Jennings – trumpet, flugelhorn
- Chris Bullock – tenor saxophone, flute, bass clarinet
- Bob Lanzetti – electric, acoustic and baritone guitars
- Mark Lettieri – electric, acoustic and baritone guitars, bass guitar
- Cory Henry – piano, keyboards
- Bill Laurance – piano, keyboards
- Robert "Sput" Searight – drums
- Nate Werth – percussion
- Katya Diaz – backing vocals
- Rachella Searight – backing vocals
- Chelsea West – backing vocals

Additional personnel

- Jayna Brown – vocals on track 15
- Chantae Cann – vocals on tracks 1 & 9
- Magda Giannikou – vocals, accordion on tracks 4 & 19
- Lalah Hathaway – vocals on track 5
- Judi Jackson – vocals on track 14
- N'Dambi – vocals on track 3
- Tony Scherr – vocals, guitar on tracks 7 & 11
- Shayna Steele – vocals on track 2
- Malika Tirolien – vocals on tracks 8 & 13
- Lucy Woodward – vocals on tracks 6 & 12
