= HPAC =

HPAC may refer to:

- Hang Gliding and Paragliding Association of Canada
- Hyde Park Art Center, in Chicago
- Hyogo Performing Arts Center, in Japan
- Health Policy Advisory Committee, oversees Major League Baseball drug policy
- H/P/A/C, an abbreviation for Hacking/Phreaking/Anarchy/Cracking (or sometimes Carding)
- Heating, Piping, Air Conditioning, similar to HVAC
- HPAC Engineering, a mechanical systems engineering magazine
- Holy Pentecostal Assembly Churches
- High Performance Analytics and Computing, e.g. in the Human Brain Project.
