= Yutaka Sado =

Japanese conductor (born 1961)

Yutaka Sado (佐渡 裕, Sado Yutaka; born 13 May 1961 in Kyoto) is a Japanese conductor.

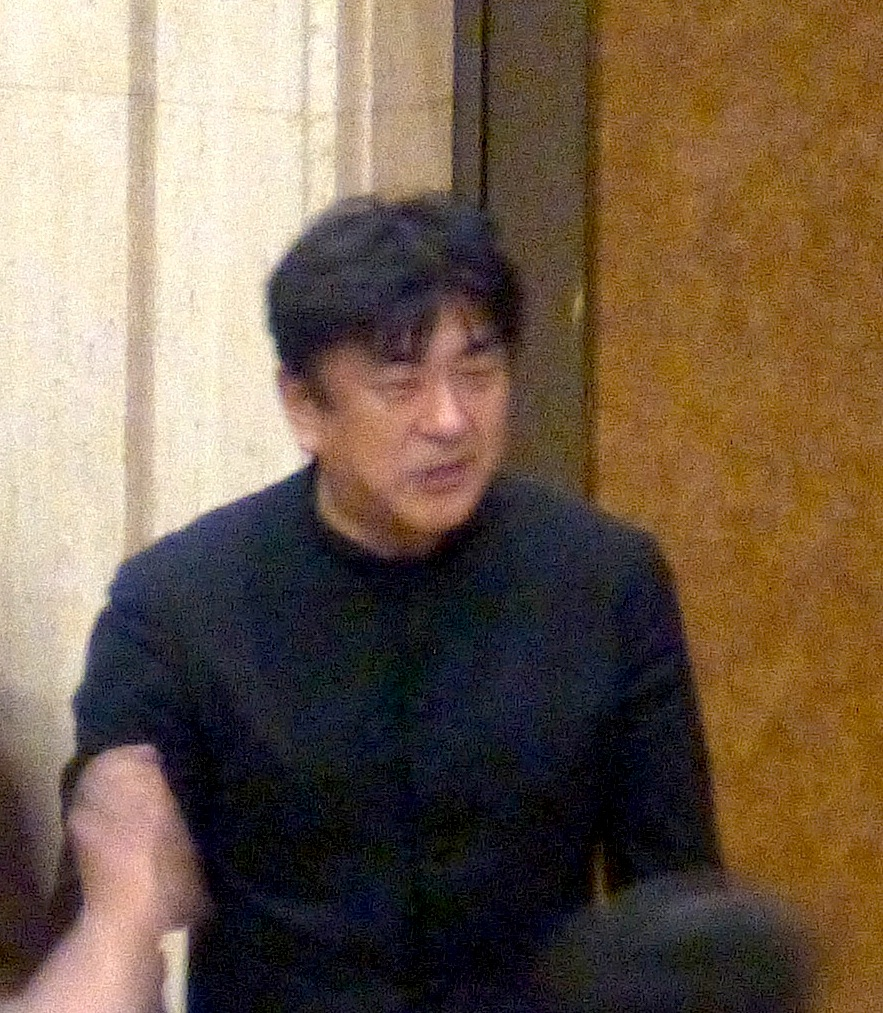
Yutaka Sado, 2016

== Biography ==
While still in school, Sado obtained a position in the Kansai Nikikai, a Japanese school of opera, where he had the opportunity to work with the New Japan Philharmonic and the Kyoto Symphony Orchestra, learning operatic repertoire. In 1987, he traveled to the United States to attend the Tanglewood Music Festival, where he studied with Seiji Ozawa. Later he won the Davidoff Special Prize for a competition in Schleswig-Holstein, Germany. He returned to Japan as an assistant to Ozawa and made his debut with the New Japan Philharmonic in Tokyo with a Haydn symphony series. He later studied with Charles Dutoit, Gennady Rozhdestvensky, and Leonard Bernstein, with whom he toured the Soviet Union and Germany.

Sado won first prize and became the third Japanese winner (after Seiji Ozawa in 1959 and Yoko Matsuo in 1982) at the 39th annual International Besançon Competition for Young Conductors in Besançon, France in 1989. In 1990, he became a regular participant in the Pacific Music Festival in Sapporo, Japan, along with Christoph Eschenbach and Michael Tilson Thomas. Sado also serves as artistic director and artistic advisor of the Hyogo Performing Arts Center and principal conductor of the Hyogo Performing Arts Center Orchestra which he helped establish in 2005. Sado also is chief conductor of the Siena Wind Orchestra in Japan.

Outside Japan, Sado was principal conductor of the Orchestre Lamoureux from 1993 to 2011. He recorded with the Orchestre Lamoureux for such labels as Erato. In October 1995, Sado was named the winner of the first Leonard Bernstein Jerusalem International Music Competition. In 2011, he conducted Beethoven's 9th symphony, with 10,000 Japanese people, for the victims of the 2011 Japanese earthquake. In November 2013, the Tonkünstler Orchestra announced the appointment of Sado as its next principal conductor, effective with the 2015–2016 season, with an initial contract of 3 years. Sado concluded his tenure with the Tonkünstler Orchestra at the close of the 2024–2025 season.

Cultural offices
Preceded by Valentin Kojin	Principal Conductor, Lamoureux Orchestra; 1993–2011	Succeeded by Fayçal Karoui
