= Time River =

Studio album by Miho Hazama m_unit
- Released: September 23, 2015
- Recorded: April 1–2, 2015
- Studio: Avatar (New York, New York)
- Genre: Jazz
- Label: Sunnyside; Verve

Miho Hazama chronology
| Journey to Journey (2012) | Time River (2015) | The Monk: Live at Bimhuis (2018) |

Professional ratings
Review scores
| Source | Rating |
|---|---|
| All About Jazz | 4.5/5 stars |

Time River is a studio album by Miho Hazama and her chamber orchestra m_unit, released in September 2015.

== Background ==
"Under the Same Moon" was originally composed when Miho Hazama was around twenty years old. When Miho was introduced from Gil Goldstein about his video of accordion quartet via email, she noticed and felt similarity. Then she decided to rearrange "Under the Same Moon" for Gil and m_unit, her bigband. Gil was invited as a guest player.

In the title track "Time River", another guest, Joshua Redman is playing.

At the end of this album, a track of American rock supergroup A Perfect Circle, "Magdalena" from Mer de Noms, 2000, is included. Miho Hazama had been playing tracks of A Perfect Circle in her cover band, when she was a senior high school student, and her favorite track was "The Hollow" on the album Mer de Noms. She decided to conclude Time River with the bright tone track "Magdalena" from Mer de Noms, after a series of narrative tracks.

== Track listing ==
All compositions by Miho Hazama except as indicated.

1. "The Urban Legend" – 7:59
2. "Cityscape" – 7:10
3. "Under the Same Moon" – 8:21
4. "Dizzy Dizzy Wildflower" – 8:46
5. "Alternate Universe, Was That Real?" – 3:14
6. "Introduction" – 2:59
7. "Fugue" – 6:00
8. "Time River" – 10:26
9. "Magdalena" (Billy Howerdel and Maynard James Keenan) – 6:38

== Personnel ==
- Miho Hazama – conductor, piano (tracks: 6, 7)
- Matthew Jodrell – trumpet, flugelhorn (tracks: 1 to 5, 8, 9)
- Joshua Redman – soprano saxophone, tenor saxophone [guest] (track: 8)
- Cam Collins – alto saxophone, clarinet (tracks: 1 to 5, 8, 9)
- Ryoji Ihara – tenor saxophone, soprano saxophone, flute (tracks: 1 to 5, 8, 9)
- Andrew Gutauskas – baritone saxophone, bass clarinet (tracks: 1 to 5, 8, 9)
- Adam Unsworth – French horn (tracks: 1 to 5, 8, 9)
- Alex Brown – piano (tracks: 1, 3, 4, 9)
- Sam Harris – piano (tracks: 2, 5, 8)
- Gil Goldstein – accordion [guest] (track: 3)
- James Shipp – vibraphone (tracks: 1 to 5, 8, 9)
- Sam Anning – bass (tracks: 1 to 5, 8, 9)
- Jake Goldbas – drums
- Sara Caswell – violin
- Joyce Hammann – violin
- Meaghan Burke – cello
- Lois Martin – viola
