= Vince Mendoza =

American composer, arranger & conductor (born 1961)

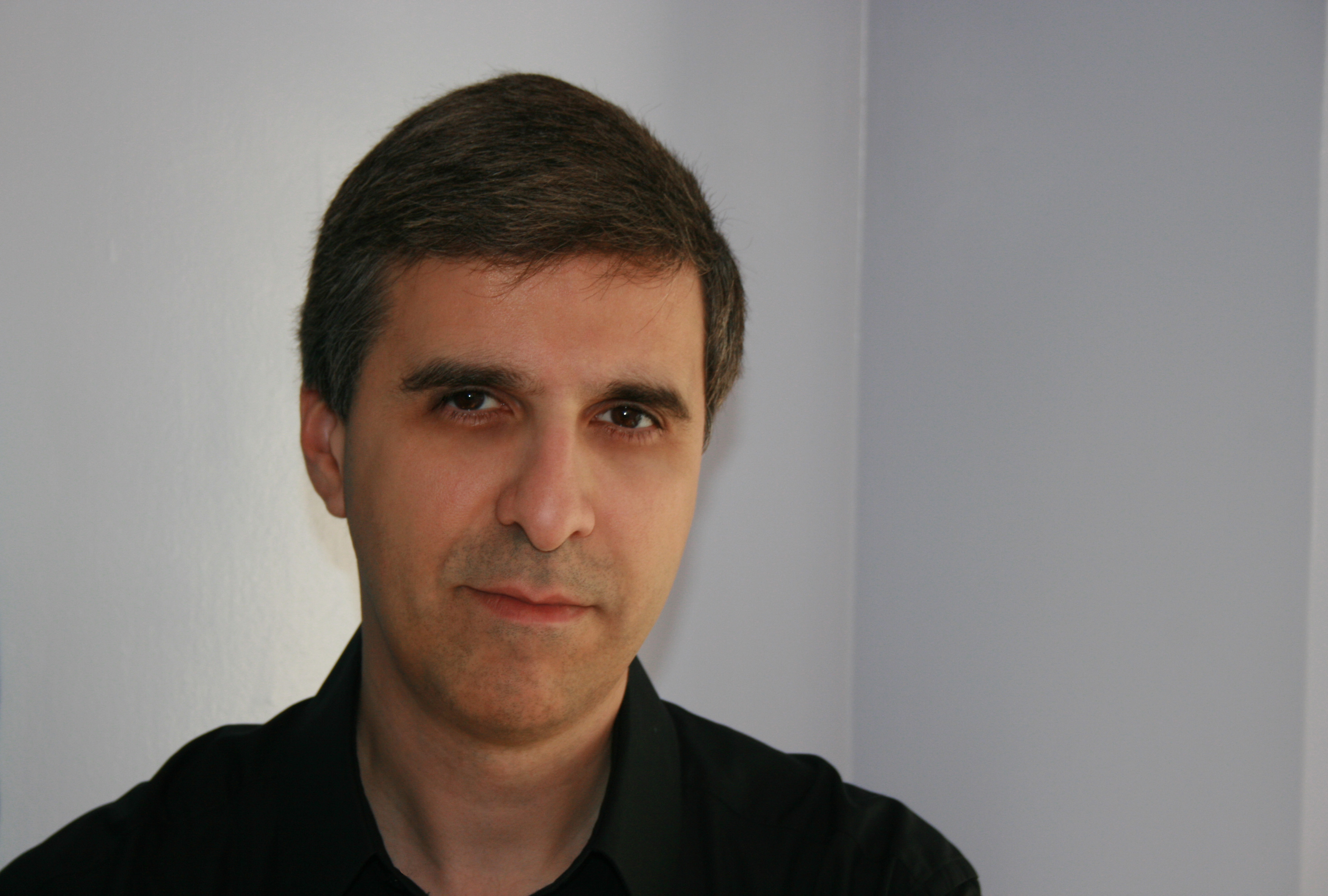

Background information
- Born: November 17, 1961 (age 64); Norwalk, Connecticut, U.S.
- Genres: Jazz, symphonic music, world music
- Occupations: Composer, arranger, conductor
- Years active: 1989–present
- Labels: Blue Note, ACT, Transparent, Geffen, BMG – Modern Recordings
- Website: www.vincemendoza.net

Vince Mendoza (born November 17, 1961) is an American composer, music arranger and conductor. He debuted as a solo artist in 1989, and is known for his work conducting the Metropole Orkest and WDR Big Band Köln, as well as arranging music for musicians such as John Scofield, Joni Mitchell, Michael Brecker and Björk. Over the course of his career, he has won seven Grammy Awards and one Latin Grammy Award and has been nominated for a total of 38 between the two awards.

== Early life ==
Mendoza was born in Norwalk, Connecticut in 1961, He began studying music on the piano and classical guitar at an early age, before changing his focus to playing the trumpet and composing in high school, due to his love of jazz and soul music. Mendoza wrote music for his high school jazz ensemble, later continuing studies in music composition at Ohio State University. Mendoza moved to Los Angeles in 1983, where he completed a master's degree in composition at USC Thornton School of Music.

== Career ==
In Los Angeles, Mendoza began to make connections in the music industry, arranging music for television and recordings, and for artists such as Peter Erskine, Charlie Haden and Rickie Lee Jones. He was signed to Blue Note Records, with whom he released Start Here (1990) and Instructions Inside (1991). In 1992 he released Jazzpaña with American producer Arif Mardin in 1991, garnering his first Grammy Nomination for the song "Buleria". In 1994, Mendoza released a big band album called Sketches, collaborating with the WDR Big Band. In 1995, Mendoza began his work with the Dutch Metropole Orkest and was appointed the principal guest conductor in 1998. In 1999, Mendoza composed the music and conducted the London Symphony Orchestra on his album Epiphany.

His compositions can be heard on recordings by Gary Burton, Pat Metheny, Sean Jones, Michael Brecker, John Abercrombie and Charlie Haden. Mendoza provided arrangements for Björk's Vespertine (2001) and for her score to Lars von Trier's Dancer in the Dark (2000). His arrangements are also heard on recordings by Gregory Porter, Chaka Khan, Elvis Costello, Robbie Williams, Robert Glasper, Bobby McFerrin, Sting, as well as Herbie Hancock and Al Jarreau. He has worked as an arranger, conductor, and/or producer on six Grammy Award-winning albums: Travelogue and Both Sides Now by Joni Mitchell; Some Skunk Funk by Randy Brecker and Michael Brecker; Brown Street by Joe Zawinul; 54 by the Metropole Orkest and John Scofield; and his own collaborative album with the Metropole Orkest, El Viento: The Garcia Lorca Project. From 2005 to 2013 he was chief conductor of the Dutch Metropole Orkest. He has also served as the guest conductor for the Los Angeles Philharmonic, the Hollywood Bowl Orchestra, and the New York Philharmonic, among others.

In 2021, Mendoza released an album entitled Freedom Over Everything in collaboration with the Czech National Symphony Orchestra. The album's title track featured guest vocals from Black Thought of The Roots. Another track from that album, "To The Edge of Longing", featured soprano Julia Bullock and garnered Mendoza the Grammy Award for Best Arrangement, Instrumental and Vocals. Mendoza works as an adjunct professor of jazz composition at USC Thornton School of Music. He is also the composer-in-residence with the WDR Big Band.

== Discography ==
=== As leader ===
Title	Details	Peak chart positions
Title	Details	US Jazz
Vince Mendoza	Released: 1989; Label: H.I.T. Avenue; Formats: CD	—
Start Here	Released: 1990; Label: World Pacific; Formats: CD, cassette	—
Instructions Inside	Released: 1991; Label: Blue Note, Manhattan; Formats: CD, cassette	—
Jazzpaña (as The Mendoza/Mardin Project)	Released: 1992; Label: ACT; Formats: CD	—
Sketches	Released: 1994; Label: ACT; Formats: CD	—
Caribbean Night (with WDR Big Band Köln)	Released: 1997; Label: BHM; Formats: CD	—
Epiphany (with the London Symphony Orchestra)	Released: 1999; Label: Zebra Acoustic; Formats: CD	—
Blauklang	Released: September 26, 2008; Label: ACT; Formats: CD, digital download	—
El Viento: The Garcia Lorca Project (with the Metropole Orkest)	Released: June 2009; Label: ACT; Formats: CD, digital download	—
Fast City: A Tribute to Joe Zawinul (with the Metropole Orkest)	Released: 2010; Label: BHM; Formats: CD, digital download	—
The Phoenix (with Danish Radio Big Band)	Released: 2010; Label: Red Dot; Formats: CD, digital download	—
Nights on Earth	Released: 2011; Label: Horizontal; Formats: CD, digital download	35
Homecoming (with WDR Big Band)	Released: 2017; Label: Sunnyside; Formats: CD, digital download	—
Freedom Over Everything (with the Czech National Symphony Orchestra)	Released: 2021; Label: BMG Modern Recordings; Formats: CD, digital download	—
Olympians (with the Metropole Orkest)	Release date: March 3, 2023; Label: BMG Modern Recordings; Formats: CD, digital download	—

=== Singles ===
Title	Year	Album
"Freedom Over Everything" (with Black Thought)	2021	Freedom Over Everything
"Esperanto" (with the Metropole Orkest, featuring Dianne Reeves)	2023	Olympians

=== As arranger and conductor ===
With the Metropole Orkest

- Bart van Lier – Twilight (Koch Jazz, 1998)
- Elvis Costello – Live with the Metropole Orkest – My Flame Burns Blue (DG, 2006)
- Trijntje Oosterhuis – The Look Of Love: Burt Bacharach Songbook (Blue Note, 2006)
- Trijntje Oosterhuis – Who'll Speak for Love: Burt Bacharach Songbook II (Blue Note, 2007)
- Jim Beard – Revolutions (Intuition, 2008)[SACD]
- Trijntje Oosterhuis – Best of Burt Bacharach Live (Blue Note/EMI, 2009) – compilation
- Ivan Lins – Regência: Vince Mendoza (Biscoito Fino, 2009)
- Metropole Orkest / John Scofield - 54 (EmArcy, 2010)
- Chris Minh Doky / Larry Goldings / Peter Erskine – Scenes from a Dream (Red Dot, 2010)
- Al Jarreau – Al Jarreau and the Metropole Orkest Live (Concord, 2012)
- Metropole Orkest - Perfect Vision: The Esquivel Sound (Basta, 2013)
- Raul Midón – If You Really Want (Artistry Music, 2018)
- Cory Wong – Live in Amsterdam (Cory Wong, 2020)

With WDR Big Band Cologne

- Randy Brecker w/Michael Brecker – Some Skunk Funk (Telarc, 2005)
- Joe Zawinul – Brown Street (WDR/Intuition, 2006)
- Chano Domínguez – Soleando (Jazzline, 2015)
- Antonio Sánchez - Channels of Energy (Camjazz, 2018)
- Fred Hersch - Begin Again (Palmetto, 2019)
- Luciana Souza - Storytellers (Sunnyside, 2020)

With Björk

- Selmasongs (One Little Indian, 2000)
- Vespertine (One Little Indian, 2001)

With Peter Erskine

- Transition (Passport Jazz, 1986/Denon, 1987)
- Motion Poet (Denon, 1988)

With Joni Mitchell

- Both Sides Now (Reprise, 2000)
- Travelogue (Nonesuch, 2002)

With others

- Michael Brecker – Don't Try This at Home (Impulse!, 1988)
- Al Di Meola – World Sinfonia (Tomato, 1991)
- Yellowjackets – Greenhouse (MCA, 1991)
- Jimmy Haslip – Arc (GRP, 1993)
- Kyle Eastwood – From Here to There (Columbia, 1998)
- Stefano di Battista – 'Round About Roma (Blue Note, 2002)
- Yuri Honing - Symphonic (Challenge, 2006)
- Melody Gardot – My One and Only Thrill (Verve, 2009)
- Mary Chapin Carpenter - Songs from the Movie (Zoë, 2014)
- Nils Landgren with Janis Siegel, Bochumer Symphoniker, Some Other Time: A Tribute to Leonard Bernstein (ACT, 2016)
- Lang Lang - New York Rhapsody (Sony Classical, 2016)
- Gregory Porter – Nat King Cole & Me (Blue Note, 2017)
- Temple University Studio Orchestra – Constant Renaissance (BCM+D Records, 2019)
- Melody Gardot - Sunset in the Blue (Decca, 2020)
- Elvis Costello and Burt Bacharach – The Songs of Bacharach and Costello (Universal, 2023)

=== As instrumentalist ===
- Rickie Lee Jones, Flying Cowboys (Geffen, 1989)
- John Abercrombie, Animato (ECM, 1990)
- Peter Erskine, Big Theatre (Ah Um, 1996)

== Awards ==
=== Grammy Awards ===
Year	Nominated work	Category	Result	Source
2001	"Both Sides, Now" (2000 re-recording) (Joni Mitchell)	Best Arrangement, Instrumental and Vocals	Won	
2004	"Woodstock" (Joni Mitchell)	Best Arrangement, Instrumental and Vocals	Won	
2007	Some Skunk Funk (Randy Brecker and Michael Brecker)	Best Large Jazz Ensemble Album	Won	
2008	"In a Silent Way" (Joe Zawinul)	Best Instrumental Arrangement	Won	
2011	"Carlos" (John Scofield and the Metropole Orkest)	Best Arrangement, Instrumental or A Cappella	Won	
2022	"To The Edge of Longing" (Edit Version) (Vince Mendoza with the Czech National Symphony Orchestra, featuring Julia Bullock)	Best Arrangement, Instruments and Vocals	Won	
2023	"Songbird" (Orchestral Version) (Christine McVie)	Best Arrangement, Instruments and Vocals	Won	

=== Latin Grammy Awards ===
Year	Nominated work	Category	Result
2009	Regência: Vince Mendoza (with Ivan Lins and the Metropole Orchestra)	Best MPB Album	Won
