= 54 (album) =

Studio album by Metropole Orkest featuring John Scofield
- Released: May 2010
- Recorded: 9–13 March 2009
- Studio: MCO Studio, Hilversum, Nederland
- Genre: jazz
- Label: Emarcy

Metropole Orkest chronology
Crush (2010)	54 (2010)	Moke + Metropole Orkest (2010)

John Scofield chronology
Piety Street (2009)	54 (2010)	A Moment's Peace (2011)

54 is an album of Metropole Orkest conducted by Vince Mendoza featuring jazz guitarist John Scofield, and was released in May 2010.

== Reception ==
Professional ratings
Review scores
Source	Rating
All About Jazz	4.5/5 stars
The Guardian	3/5 stars

At the 53rd Annual Grammy Awards, the album was nominated for Best Large Jazz Ensemble Album, and Best Instrumental Arrangement went to Vince Mendoza for arranging "Carlos", the opening track.

John Bungey of The Times wrote: "The Dutch Metropole Orchestra surround Scofield's bluesy riffs with strings and brass and some tracks will be too soft-edged for hardcore jazz types. But Scofield is at his best, fluent, creative and funky, and an epic version of his old tune 'Twang' is a knock-out."

The Guardian's John Fordham commented: "The arrangements could have reflected [Scofield's] bite and pungency a little more, but there's plenty of punch to this set."

In a review for All About Jazz, John Kelman remarked: "Combining Mendoza's stunning arrangements and some of Scofield's best playing in years, 54 is a milestone in both artists' discographies... both artists transcend individual skill to create an hour-long whole that truly exceeds the sum of its many compelling parts."

== Track listing ==
1. "Carlos" (John Scofield, arranged by Vince Mendoza) – 9:00
2. "Jung Parade" (Vince Mendoza) – 7:38
3. "Polo Towers" (John Scofield, arranged by Vince Mendoza) – 6:53
4. "Honest I Do" (John Scofield, arranged by Vince Mendoza) – 4:25
5. "Twang" (John Scofield, arranged by Vince Mendoza) – 9:24
6. "Imaginary Time" (John Scofield, arranged by Florian Ross) – 6:21
7. "Peculiar" (John Scofield, arranged by Vince Mendoza) – 7:40
8. "Say We Did" (Vince Mendoza) – 8:30
9. "Out of the City" (John Scofield, arranged by Jim McNeely) – 5:34

== Personnel ==
- John Scofield – guitar
- Metropole Orkest
  - Conductor – Vince Mendoza
  - Trumpet – Erik Veldkamp, Jan Hollander, Jelle Schouten, Ruud Breuls
  - Saxophone, Clarinet – Jos Beeren, Leo Janssen, Marc Scholten, Max Boeree, Paul van der Feen
  - Flute – Janine Abbas, Mariël van den Bos
  - Trombone – Bart van Lier, Jan Bastiani, Jan Oosting
  - French horn – Pieter Hunfeld
  - Bass trombone – Martin van den Berg
  - Oboe – Willem Luijt
  - Piano – Hans Vroomans
  - Guitar – Peter Tiehuis
  - Bass – Aram Kersbergen
  - Drums – Martijn Vink
  - Percussion – Eddy Koopman, Murk Jiskoot
  - Violin [1st Violin] – Alida Schat, Arlia de Ruiter, David Peijnenborgh, Denis Koenders, Erica Korthals Altes, Feyona van Iersel, Pauline Terlouw, Seija Teeuwen
  - Violin [2nd Violin] – Elizabeth Liefkes-Cats, Herman van Haaren, Lucja Domski, Marianne van den Heuvel, Merijn Rombout, Vera van der Bie, Wim Kok
  - Viola – Iris Schut, Isabella Petersen, Julia Jowett, Mieke Honingh, Norman Jansen
  - Cello – Annie Tangberg, Bastiaan van der Werf, Emile Visser, Jascha Albracht
  - Contrabass – Arend Liefkes, Erik Winkelmann, Tjerk de Vos
  - Harp – Joke Schonewille
