= If You Really Want =

Studio album by Raul Midón with The Metropole Orkest
- Released: September 14, 2018
- Studio: MCO Studio 3 and 5, Hilversum, Nederland
- Label: Artistry Music

Raul Midón chronology
Bad Ass and Blind (2017)	If You Really Want (2018)	The Mirror (2020)

Metropole Orkest chronology
Scripted Orkestra (2018)	If You Really Want (2018)	What Heat (2018)

Professional ratings
Review scores
Source	Rating
All About Jazz	4.5/5 stars

If You Really Want is an album by Raul Midón with The Metropole Orkest, released in September 14, 2018. This album was nominated for Best Jazz Vocal Album in the 61st Annual Grammy Awards.

== Track listing ==
All compositions by Raul Midón except as indicated.

1. "Ride on a Rainbow" – 4:12
2. "God's Dream" – 4:41
3. "If You Really Want" – 4:41
4. "All Love Is Blind" – 3:22
5. "Sunshine (I Can Fly)" (written by Albert Menendez, Luis Vega and Raul Midón) – 6:38
6. "Ocean Dreamer" – 3:30
7. "Pick Somebody Up" – 3:28
8. "Everyone Deserves a Second Chance" (arranged by Miho Hazama) – 5:05
9. "Sittin' in the Middle" – 5:34
10. "Suddenly" – 3:50

== Personnel ==
Musicians

- Raul Midón – Vocals, Guitar
- Metropole Orkest
  - Conductor – Vince Mendoza
  - Trumpet – Jan Wessels, Jelle Schouten, Peter van Soest, Ray Bruinsma
  - Saxophone, Clarinet – Leo Janssen, Marc Scholten, Max Boeree, Paul van der Feen, Werner Janssen
  - Trombone – Bart Van Lier, Jan Bastiani, Jan Oosting
  - Bass Trombone – Bart van Gorp
  - Flute – Janine Abbas, Nola Exel
  - Horn – Jasper de Waal, Pieter Hunfeld
  - Oboe – Willem Luijt
  - Piano, Keyboards – Hans Vroomans
  - Electric Guitar, Acoustic Guitar – Peter Tiehuis
  - Double Bass – Arend Liefkes, Erik Winkelmann, Walter van Egeraat
  - Electric Bass, Acoustic Bass – Aram Kersbergen
  - Drums – Martijn Vink
  - Percussion – Eddy Koopman, Murk Jiskoot
  - Violin [1st] – Alida Schat, Arlia De Ruiter, David Peijnenborgh, Denis Koenders, Ewa Zbyszynska, Jasper van Rosmalen, Pauline Terlouw, Ruben Margarita
  - Violin [2nd] – Federico Nathan, Herman Van Haaren, Merel Jonker, Merijn Rombout, Robert Baba, Seija Teeuwen, Wim Kok
  - Cello – Annie Tangberg*, Emile Visser, Jascha Albracht, Maarten Jansen
  - Viola – Isabella Petersen, Julia Jowett, Marit Ladage, Mieke Honingh, Norman Jansen
  - Harp – Joke Schonewille

Production

- Raul Midón – producer, A&R, engineer (recording, editing, overdubbing)
- Vince Mendoza – producer
- Gert-Jan Blom – artistic producer for Metropole Orkest
- Will Wakefield – A&R (senior director)
- Kathleen Midón – A&R
- Paul Dorin – assistant engineer (recording)
- Dirk Overeem – assistant engineer (recording)
- Darcy Proper – engineer (mastering)
- Tijmen Zinkhaan – engineer (mixing)
- Erik Van Der Horst – assistant engineer (mixing)
- Kathleen – management
- Zot Management – management
- Sharon Green – management (marketing director)
- Fiona Bloom – public relations
- The Bloom Effect – public relations
- Raj Naik – art direction, design
- Samuel Prather – photography
