= Some Skunk Funk =

Live album by Randy Brecker with Michael Brecker
- Released: November 2005
- Recorded: November 11, 2003
- Venue: Forum, Leverkusen, Germany
- Genre: Jazz, Big Band
- Length: 68:48
- Label: Telarc (USA only); BHM Productions
- Producer: Joachim Becker, Lucas Schmid

Randy Brecker chronology
Soul Bop Band Live (2004)	Some Skunk Funk (2005)	Transatlantic Connection (2006)

Michael Brecker chronology
Wide Angles (2003)	Some Skunk Funk (2005)	Pilgrimage (2007)

Professional ratings
Review scores
Source	Rating
The Penguin Guide to Jazz Recordings	3.5/4 stars

Some Skunk Funk is a live album by Randy Brecker with Michael Brecker. It was recorded on November 11, 2003, at the Forum in Leverkusen, Germany and was released in November 2005.

In 2006 it won Grammy Awards for Best Jazz Instrumental Solo (Michael Brecker) and Best Large Jazz Ensemble Album.

== Track listing ==
All tracks are written by Randy Brecker except where noted.

No.	Title	Length
1.	"Some Skunk Funk"	5.51
2.	"Sponge"	6.46
3.	"Shanghigh"	6.40
4.	"Wayne Out"	4:56
5.	"And Then She Wept"	6:07
6.	"Strap Hangin'" (Michael Brecker)	8:18
7.	"Let It Go"	8:02
8.	"Freefall"	6:17
9.	"Levitate"	4:58
10.	"Song for Barry" (Michael Brecker)	10:32

== Personnel ==
Musicians

- Randy Brecker – trumpet
- Michael Brecker – tenor saxophone
- Jim Beard – piano, synthesizer
- Koji Paul Shigihara – guitar
- Will Lee – bass guitar
- Peter Erskine – drums
- Marcio Doctor – percussion
- WDR Big Band
  - Vince Mendoza – conductor, arranger
  - Rob Bruynen – trumpet
  - Andy Haderer – trumpet
  - Rick Kiefer – trumpet
  - John Marshall – trumpet
  - Klaus Osterloh – trumpet
  - David Horler – trombone
  - Bernt Laukamp – trombone
  - Ludwig Nuss – trombone
  - Mattis Cederberg – bass trombone
  - Harold Rosenstein – alto saxophone
  - Heiner Wiberny – alto saxophone
  - Olivier Peters – tenor saxophone
  - Rolf Römer – tenor saxophone
  - Jens Neufang – baritone saxophone

Production

- Joachim Becker – producer
- Lucas Schmid – producer
- Peter Brandt – engineer
- Klaus Genuit – mixing
- Knut Schötteldreier – cover design
- Ines Kaiser – photography
