= Pilgrimage (Michael Brecker album) =

Studio album by Michael Brecker
- Released: May 22, 2007
- Recorded: August 2006
- Studio: Right Track, New York City
- Genre: Jazz
- Length: 77:46
- Label: Heads Up
- Producer: Michael Brecker, Gil Goldstein, Steve Rodby, Pat Metheny

Michael Brecker chronology
Some Skunk Funk (2005)	Pilgrimage (2007)

Pilgrimage is the final studio album by saxophonist Michael Brecker. It was recorded in 2006, released the following year, and won Grammys for Best Jazz Instrumental Album, Individual or Group and Best Jazz Instrumental Solo.

== Background ==
In 2005 Brecker announced that he would no longer perform in public as he had myelodysplastic syndrome, which led to leukemia. Despite this, he was able to make some guest appearances the following year, and planned the recording sessions that led to this album being made.

== Recording and music ==
The album was recorded in August 2006. The personnel consists of Brecker, guitarist Pat Metheny, pianists Herbie Hancock and Brad Mehldau, bassist John Patitucci, and drummer Jack DeJohnette.

All of the nine compositions were Brecker originals, written for this recording. The title of the ballad "When Can I Kiss You Again?" was from Brecker's son, who asked him that question while Brecker was in medical isolation.

== Release and reception ==
Professional ratings
Review scores
Source	Rating
AllMusic	4/5 stars
The Penguin Guide to Jazz	3.5/4 stars

Pilgrimage was released in 2007 by Heads Up. The AllMusic reviewer wrote: "This is a brilliant and inspiring album – and would be whether or not it had anything to do with the death of one of the great figures in American jazz."

The Penguin Guide to Jazz praised some of the compositions, concluded that, "as a memorial it's pretty good", but suggested that they were being generous because it was Brecker's final recording. In the later The Penguin Jazz Guide they reflected "This was somewhat of a misread. So impressive, so meticulously crafted were his solos, and so many of them in circulation, that it was easy to think there would be another one along any minute. Until 13 January 2007, that was the case. The ensuing silence has changed the value of what went before"

The album won Brecker two posthumous Grammy awards: for Best Jazz Instrumental Solo (for his solo on "Anagram") and Best Jazz Instrumental Album, Individual or Group.

== Track listing ==
All music is composed by Michael Brecker

No.	Title	Length
1.	"The Mean Time"	6:55
2.	"Five Months from Midnight"	7:40
3.	"Anagram"	10:09
4.	"Tumbleweed"	9:36
5.	"When Can I Kiss You Again?"	9:42
6.	"Cardinal Rule"	7:31
7.	"Half Moon Lane"	7:17
8.	"Loose Threads"	8:34
9.	"Pilgrimage"	10:02

== Personnel ==
=== Musicians ===
- Michael Brecker – tenor saxophone, EWI
- Pat Metheny – guitars, guitar synthesizer
- Herbie Hancock – piano, Fender Rhodes (tracks 1, 5, 8, 9)
- Brad Mehldau – piano (tracks 2, 3, 4, 6, 7)
- John Patitucci – double bass
- Jack DeJohnette – drums

=== Technical personnel ===
- Michael Brecker – producer
- Gil Goldstein – producer
- Steve Rodby – producer
- Pat Metheny – producer
- Joe Ferla – recording and mixing
- Mark Wilder – mastering at Battery Studios, New York City, USA

== Awards ==
2008 – 50th Annual GRAMMY Awards

Years	Winner	Title	Category
2008	Michael Brecker	"Anagram"	Grammy Award for Best Improvised Jazz Solo
2008	Michael Brecker	Pilgrimage	Grammy Award for Best Jazz Instrumental Album
