= My Flame Burns Blue =

Live album by Elvis Costello with the Metropole Orkest
- Released: 28 February 2006
- Recorded: July 2004
- Genre: Jazz
- Length: 70:03
- Label: Deutsche Grammophon
- Producer: Elvis Costello

Elvis Costello chronology
The Delivery Man (2004)	My Flame Burns Blue (2006)	The River in Reverse (2006)

Metropole Orkest chronology
MetroPaul (2004)	My Flame Burns Blue (2006)	The Look of Love (2006)

Professional ratings
Review scores
Source	Rating
AllMusic	4/5 stars
Rolling Stone	3.5/5 stars

My Flame Burns Blue is the twenty-second album by Elvis Costello, released on Deutsche Grammophon. It consists of recordings from the North Sea Jazz Festival in July 2004, made with Steve Nieve and The Metropole Orkest conducted by Vince Mendoza. It peaked at No. 2 on the Billboard Jazz albums chart and at No. 188 on the Billboard 200.

== Content ==
In addition to items from Costello's back catalogue, the album presents songs written for different projects for various kinds of ensembles. The Charles Mingus composition "Hora Decubitus" initially appeared on the album Mingus Mingus Mingus Mingus Mingus. "Upon A Veil of Midnight Blue" would be recorded by the posthumous Charles Mingus Orchestra, initially written for rhythm and blues singer Charles Brown. "Speak Darkly My Angel" was written for Anne Sofie von Otter and the Brodsky Quartet, while "Put Away Forbidden Playthings" was his contribution to a concert commemorating the death of Henry Purcell. A version of "Almost Ideal Eyes" with the Attractions had been an outtake for All This Useless Beauty.

With this album, Costello joined the ranks of songwriters adding lyrics to jazz instrumentals, a practice encompassing classic pop, jazz standards, and vocalese. In addition to the Mingus tune, he drafted words for "Blood Count" by Billy Strayhorn, appearing here as the title song "My Flame Burns Blue."

The initial release included a bonus disc of an abridged version of his 2004 ballet score recording Il Sogno, performed by the London Symphony Orchestra and conducted by Michael Tilson Thomas.

== Track listing ==
All tracks are written by Elvis Costello unless otherwise indicated.

No.	Title	Writer(s)	Length
1.	"Hora Decubitus"	Charles Mingus, Costello	5:46
2.	"Favourite Hour"		3:58
3.	"That's How You Got Killed Before"	Dave Bartholomew	4:14
4.	"Upon a Veil of Midnight Blue"		5:12
5.	"Clubland"		4:52
6.	"Almost Blue"		5:51
7.	"Speak Darkly, My Angel"		3:59
8.	"Almost Ideal Eyes"		4:16
9.	"Can You Be True?"		3:57
10.	"Put Away Forbidden Playthings"		4:22
11.	"Episode of Blonde"		6:09
12.	"My Flame Burns Blue (Blood Count)"	Billy Strayhorn, Costello	5:14
13.	"Watching the Detectives"		5:24
14.	"God Give Me Strength"	Burt Bacharach, Costello	6:56
Total length:			70:03

== Personnel ==
- Elvis Costello – vocals
- Steve Nieve – piano, melodica solo on "Almost Blue"
- Metropole Orkest
  - Vince Mendoza – conductor
  - Ruud Breuls – trumpet solo on "Hora Decubitus," "That's How You Got Killed Before," "Clubland," "Almost Blue," "Almost Ideal Eyes," "Episode of Blonde," "Watching the Detectives"
  - Bart van Lier – trombone solo on "Hora Decubitus," "That's How You Got Killed Before," "Watching the Detectives"
  - Leo Janssen – tenor saxophone solo on "Hora Decubitus"
  - Jos Beeren – tenor saxophone solo on "That's How You Got Killed Before"
  - Marc Scholten – alto saxophone solo on "My Flame Burns Blue" and "Watching the Detectives"
  - Paul van der Feen – soprano saxophone solo on "Clubland"
  - Peter Tiehuis – guitar solo on "Hora Decubitus" and "Episode of Blonde"
  - Olof Groesz – cello solo on "Almost Blue"

== Charts ==
Chart (2006)	Peak position
Australian Albums (ARIA)	166
US Billboard 200	188
US Top Jazz Albums (Billboard)	2
