= Journey to Journey =

Studio album by Miho Hazama m_unit
- Released: November 14, 2012
- Recorded: July 2–3, 2012
- Studio: Systems Two, Brooklyn, NYC
- Genre: Jazz
- Label: Sunnyside; Verve

Miho Hazama chronology
Journey to Journey (2012)	Time River (2015)

Journey to Journey is the debut album of Miho Hazama and her chamber orchestra m_unit, released in November 2012.

== Background ==
This debut album was recorded in July 2012 just after Miho Hazama had got master's degree from Manhattan School of Music (MSM), and was directed by Jim McNeely who had been her supervisor at MSM. As Miho could not find suitable players for string section except for cello, she consulted with Jim McNeely, and Jim introduced Mark Feldman. Then Mark called the other strings players. Sam Anning for bass and Meaghan Burke for cello were her classmates at MSM, and Jake Goldbas for drums was one year after them. Half of the band members are from MSM.

== Reception ==
Journey to Journey received "Jazz Japan Album of the year / Rising star category" in Jazz Japan Award 2012.

Also, this album was listed in "Best Albums of 2013 / New Albums" page in DownBeat magazine.

== Track listing ==
All compositions by Miho Hazama except as indicated.

1. "Mr O" – 7:51
2. "Tokyo Confidential" – 8:10
3. "Blue Forest" – 7:54
4. "Journey to Journey" – 8:08
5. "Paparazzi" (Stefani Germanotta) – 5:51
6. "Believing in Myself" – 6:41
7. "Ballad" – 1:41
8. "What Will You See When You Turn the Next Corner" – 9:36
9. "Hidamari" – 9:30

== Personnel ==
- Miho Hazama – conductor, piano (tracks: 4, 6)
- Chris Reza – conductor (track: 4)
- Philip Dizack – trumpet, flugelhorn (tracks: 1 to 5, 7 to 9)
- Ryoji Ihara – tenor saxophone, soprano saxophone, flute (tracks: 1 to 5, 7 to 9)
- Steve Wilson – alto saxophone [guest] (track: 4)
- Cam Collins – alto saxophone, clarinet (tracks: 1 to 5, 7 to 9)
- Andrew Gutauskas – baritone saxophone, bass clarinet (tracks: 1 to 5, 7 to 9)
- Bert Hill – French horn (tracks: 1 to 5, 7 to 9)
- Sam Harris (pianist) – piano (tracks: 1 to 3, 5, 7 to 9)
- Stefon Harris – vibraphone [guest] (track: 2)
- James Shipp – vibraphone (tracks: 1, 3 to 5, 7 to 9)
- Sam Anning – bass (tracks: 1 to 5, 7 to 9)
- Jake Goldbas – drums
- Mark Feldman – violin
- Joyce Hammann – violin
- Meaghan Burke – cello
- Lois Martin – viola
