= What Heat =

Studio album by Bokanté + Metropole Orkest
- Released: September 2018
- Recorded: January 6–8, 2018
- Studio: Muziekcentrum van de Omroep (MCO), Dreamland Recording Studios, Atlantic Sound Studios
- Label: Real World

Bokanté chronology
Strange Circles (2016)	What Heat (2018)

Metropole Orkest chronology
If You Really Want (2018)	What Heat (2018)	Djesse Vol. 1 (2018)

Professional ratings
Review scores
Source	Rating
The Guardian	3/5 stars

What Heat is an album by Bokanté plus Metropole Orkest, released in September 2018. This album was nominated for Best World Music Album in the 62nd Annual Grammy Awards.

== Track listing ==
All compositions by Malika Tirolien and Michael League except track 4, lyrics on folkloric rhythm.

1. "All The Way Home" – 5:17
2. "Fanm (The Woman)" – 7:14
3. "Lè An Gadé-w En Zyé (When I Look in Your Eyes)" – 5:43
4. "Réparasyons (Reparations)" – 5:33
5. "Bòd Lanmè Pa Lwen (The Beach Is Not Far)" – 6:03
6. "Don’t Do It" – 7:05
7. "Chambre à Échos (Echo Chamber)" – 7:51
8. "La Maison En Feu (House On Fire)" – 7:18

== Personnel ==
- Jules Buckley – Conductor

Bokanté

- Malika Tirolien – lead vocals
- Michael League : guitar, bass, percussion, vocals
- Chris McQueen – guitars, vocals
- Bob Lanzetti – guitars, vocals
- Roosevelt Collier – steel pedal guitar, vocals
- Weedie Braimah – djembe, vocals
- Jamey Haddad – percussion
- Keita Ogawa – percussion
- André Ferrari – percussion

Metropole Orkest

- Saxophone, clarinet – David Kweksilber, Leo Janssen, Marc Scholten, Max Boeree, Nils Van Haften, Paul van der Feen, Sjoerd Dijkhuizen
- Flute – Janine Abbas, Janneke Groesz, Mariël van den Bos
- Horn – Felix Peijnenborgh, Lies Molenaars, Pieter Hunfeld, René Pagen
- Trombone – Jan Bastiani, Jan Oosting, Martijn Sohier
- Bass Trombone – Martin van den Berg
- Double Bass – Arend Liefkes, Erik Winkelmann, Tjerk de Vos
- Percussion [Orchestral] – Eddy Koopman, Murk Jiskoot
- Cello – Annie Tångberg, Emile Visser, Jascha Albracht, Maarten Jansen
- Viola – Iris Schut, Isabella Petersen, Julia Jowett, Mieke Honingh, Norman Jansen, Wouter Huizinga
- Violin [1st] – Arlia De Ruiter, Casper Donker, Christina Knoll, David Peijnenborgh, Denis Koenders, Pauline Terlouw, Sarah Koch, Vera Laporeva
- Violin [2nd] – Ewa Zbyszynska, Herman Van Haaren, Jasper van Rosmalen, Merel Jonker, Robert Baba, Ruben Margarita, Wim Kok
