= The Monk: Live at Bimhuis =

Live album by Miho Hazama and Metropole Orkest
- Released: February 14, 2018
- Recorded: October 13, 2017
- Venue: Bimhuis, Amsterdam, Netherlands
- Genre: Jazz
- Label: Sunnyside; Verve

Miho Hazama chronology
Time River (2015)	The Monk: Live at Bimhuis (2018)	Dancer in Nowhere (2018)

Metropole Orkest chronology
MO x Caro Emerald By Grandmono (2017)	The Monk: Live at Bimhuis (2018)	Scripted Orkestra (2018)

Professional ratings
Review scores
Source	Rating
DownBeat	4/5 stars

The Monk: Live at Bimhuis is a live tribute album of Miho Hazama and Metropole Orkest Big Band playing Thelonious Monk which was released in February 2018.

== Background ==
2017 was the 100th anniversary year of Thelonious Monk's birth. Before the year, Miho hazama proposed to Metropole Orkest to hold concerts to play Thelonious Monk when she visited Metropole in September 2016, and recognized need for reasonable planning after the discussion with the producer. Under the condition of neither relationship with Monk's family nor involvement of American players, she proposed a tribute plan which includes orchestration of originally piano solo tracks and providing opportunity of make possible to compare among different arrangers, Bill Holman, Oliver Nelson and Miho. The plan was approved and concerts were held at four cities in Netherlands. Although arrangements by other arrangers were played at the concerts, they are not included in this album.

Regards to tribute jazz album, Metropole Orkest had experience of Better Get Hit In Your Soul: A Tribute To the Music of Charles Mingus which was recorded in 2009, and released in 2012.

== Track listing ==
All compositions by Thelonious Monk except as indicated. All arrangements by Miho Hazama.

1. "Thelonious" * – 6:42
2. "Ruby, My Dear" * – 8:36
3. "Friday the 13th" * – 6:58
4. "Hackensack" – 6:50
5. "'Round Midnight" (Bernie Hanighen, Cootie Williams and Thelonious Monk) – 7:53
6. "Epistrophy" * (Kenny Clarke and Thelonious Monk) – 7:52
7. "Crepuscule with Nellie" – 5:14

* Originally piano solo by Thelonious Monk.

== Personnel ==
- Miho Hazama – conductor
- Jan Bastiani, Jan Oosting, Louk Boudesteijn – trombone
- Martin van den Berg – bass Trombone
- Martijn de Laat, Nico Schepers, Ray Bruinsma – trumpet
- Rik Mol – trumpet, flugelhorn
- Leo Janssen, Marc Scholten, Max Boeree, Paul van der Feen, Sjoerd Dijkhuizen – saxophone, clarinet
- Hans Vroomans – piano
- Peter Tiehuis – guitar
- Aram Kersbergen – bass
- Marcel Serierse – drums

== See also ==
- Bill Holman, Brilliant Corners: The Music of Thelonious Monk (JVC, 1997)
- Thelonious Monk, Monk's Blues (Columbia, 1968) arranged by Oliver Nelson
