= State of Mind (Raul Midón album) =

Studio album by Raul Midón
- Released: June 7, 2005
- Genre: Soul, Flamenco, Latin
- Length: 49:50
- Label: Manhattan Records
- Producer: Arif Mardin, Joe Mardin

Professional ratings
Review scores
Source	Rating
Allmusic	3.5/5 stars

State of Mind is Raul Midón's second album, released June 7, 2005 through Manhattan Records. In the album, he occasionally uses his trademark vocal style, "instrumental voices", which are also performed by him during his live performances.

== Track listing ==
1. "State of Mind" (Midón) – 3:25
2. "If You're Gonna Leave" (Midón) – 3:51
3. "Keep on Hoping" (featuring Jason Mraz) (Midón, Jason Mraz) – 4:32
4. "Mystery Girl" (Midón) – 4:22
5. "Waited All My Life" (Midón) – 4:36
6. "Everybody" (Midón) – 4:01
7. "Expressions of Love" (featuring Stevie Wonder) (Midón) – 2:49
8. "Sittin' in the Middle" (Midón) – 3:32
9. "Suddenly" (Midón) – 3:32
10. "Never Get Enough" (Midón) – 3:45
11. "Sunshine (I Can Fly)" (Menedez, Midón, Vega) – 4:33
12. "I Would Do Anything" (Midón) – 3:34
13. "All in Your Mind" (Fournier, Midón) – 3:18
14. Where Is The Love (Duet Featuring Traincha) - 4:03 - bonus track

== Personnel ==
- Raul Midón – vocals, acoustic guitar
- Jason Mraz [guest] - vocals, acoustic guitar (track: 3)
- Traincha [guest] - vocals (track: 14)
- Stevie Wonder [guest] - harmonica (track: 7)
- Gregoire Maret - harmonica (track: 11)
- Dave Valentine - flute (track: 12)
- Joe Mardin - acoustic piano (track: 3)
- Shedrick Mitchell – Hammond organ (tracks: 1, 5, 6, 10)
- Ronald Kool - keyboards (track: 14)
- Stefon Harris - vibraphone (tracks: 7, 13)
- Jason Mraz - acoustic guitar (track: 3)
- Richard Hammond - acoustic bass (tracks: 4, 5, 9, 10)
- Eric Revis - acoustic bass (track: 11)
- Jonathan Maron - electric Bass (track: 2)
- Jerry Barnes - electric Bass (tracks: 6, 8, 14)
- Joe Mardin - drums (track: 9)
- Daniel Sadownick - percussion (tracks: 2, 4 to 6, 8 to 10)
- Cyro Baptista - percussion (track: 11)
- Sammy Figeroua- percussion (track: 12)
- Ralph MacDonald- percussion (track: 14)
- Joe Mardin - body percussion [Palms] (track: 10)
- Lisa Fisher - backing Vocals (tracks: 4, 7, 13)
