= Guy Tirolien =

Guadeloupean poet

- Born: February 13, 1917; Pointe-à-Pitre, Guadeloupe
- Died: March 8, 1988 (aged 71); Marie-Galante, Guadeloupe
- Occupations: Poet, colonial administrator, international civil servant
- Relatives: Malika Tirolien (granddaughter)
- Writing career
- Notable works: Prière d'un petit enfant nègre, Balles d'or, Feuilles vivantes au matin
- Literary movement: Négritude

Guy Tirolien (French pronunciation: [ɡi tiʁɔljɛ̃]; February 13, 1917 – March 8, 1988) was a Guadeloupean poet. He was born in Point-à-Pitre and died at the age of 71 in Marie-Galante.

== Biography ==
Guy Tirolien was born in Point-à-Pitre, Guadelope to Furcie Tirolen and Léontine Alméda Colonneau. He was admitted to the Lycée Louis-le-Grand in Paris, where he met Aimé Césaire, Léopold Sédar Senghor and Léon-Gontran Damas, with whom he took part in the creation of the Négritude ideological movement. He was also a colonial administrator in Cameroon and Mali, where he met several figures of the Harlem Renaissance. However, he was taken prisoner during World War II. Afterwards, he worked as an international civil servant, representing the UN, notably in Mali and Gabon. He is the grandfather of singer-songwriter Malika Tirolien.

== Work ==
Tirolien is known as the author of "Prière d'un petit enfant nègre" (1943), a poem included in his book "Balles d'or" published by Présence Africaine. The poem is about a black child who does not want to go to the white school. He also wrote "Feuilles vivantes au matin" under the same publisher.

== Selected works ==
- Balles d'or, published by Présence Africaine in 1961 and 1995
- Feuilles vivantes au matin, published by Présence Africaine in 1977
- De Marie-Galante à une poétique afro-antillaise, published by L'Harmattan, collected by Monde Caraïbe
- l'homme et l'œuvre, published by Présence Africaine in 1991
