= Cantando Histórias =

Studio album by Ivan Lins
- Released: 2004
- Genre: Musica Popular Brasileira
- Label: EMI
- Director: Andre Schultz
- Producer: Moogie Canazio

Ivan Lins chronology
I Love Mpb - Amor (2004)	Cantando Histórias (2004)	Acariocando (2006)

Cantando Histórias is a Latin Grammy winning album by Ivan Lins. It is the first and only Brazilian and Portuguese language album to win the Latin Grammy for Album of the Year to date.

== Track listing ==
1. Abre Alas
2. Guarde Nos Olhos
3. Dinorah, Dinorah
4. O Tempo Me Guardou Você
5. Desesperar, Jamais
6. Aos Nossos Filhos/Cartomante
7. Bilhete
8. Porta Entreaberta
9. Vitoriosa
10. Viesta/Iluminados
11. Ai, Ai, Ai, Ai, Ai
12. Começar de Novo
13. O Amor É O Meu País
14. Madalena

== Awards ==
=== Latin Grammy Awards ===
The album won the following awards at the 2005 Latin Grammy Awards:

- Album of the Year
- Best MPB (Musica Popular Brasileira) Album

== Certification ==
Region	Certification	Certified units/sales
Brazil (Pro-Música Brasil) for the DVD	Gold	25,000^{*}
^{*} Sales figures based on certification alone.
