= Possibilities =

Studio album by Herbie Hancock
- Released: August 30, 2005
- Recorded: 2005
- Studios: The Shed (New York City) (Note: Track 1); Stagg Street (Van Nuys, California); Fantasy (Berkeley, California) (Note: Track 2); Garage Sale (West Hollywood) (Note: Tracks 3 and 9); Record Plant (Hollywood) (Note: Track 3); Ocean Way (Hollywood); Henson (Hollywood) (Note: Tracks 3 and 8); Clinton (New York City) (Note: Track 4); Mayfair (London) (Note: Track 5); Phase One (Toronto) (Note: Track 6); The Village (Los Angeles) (Note: Track 7); Glenwood Place (Burbank, California); The Town House (London); Right Track (New York City) (Note: Track 9); Capitol (Hollywood); The Barn (Burlington, Vermont) (Note: Track 10); Numedia (New York City)
- Genre: Jazz
- Length: 58:31
- Labels: Hear Music; Vector
- Producers: Herbie Hancock; Alan Mintz; Greg Phillinganes

Herbie Hancock chronology
Directions in Music: Live at Massey Hall (2002)	Possibilities (2005)	River: The Joni Letters (2007)

Professional ratings
Review scores
Source	Rating
Tom Hull	C
The Penguin Guide to Jazz Recordings	2.5/4 stars

Possibilities is the thirty-ninth studio album by American jazz pianist Herbie Hancock, released on August 30, 2005, by Hear Music and Vector Recordings.

== Background ==
The album features a variety of guest musicians such as Trey Anastasio and John Mayer. It earned Hancock two nominations at the 2006 Grammy Awards: Best Pop Collaboration with Vocals for "A Song for You" (featuring Christina Aguilera) and Best Pop Instrumental Performance for "Gelo na Montanha" (featuring Anastasio). A motion picture entitled Herbie Hancock: Possibilities, released on DVD-Video on April 18, 2006, depicts the recording of this album in many different discussions and performances with the collaborating artists. The DVD-Video also includes a demo CD with four of the 10 songs on the album.

== Track listing ==
CD

No.	Title	Writer(s)	Producer(s)	Length
1.	"Stitched Up" (featuring John Mayer)	Mayer; Herbie Hancock	Hancock; Alan Mintz; Steve Jordan^{[a]}; "Bassy" Bob Brockmann^{[b]}; Yaron Fuchs^{[b]}	5:27
2.	"Safiatou" (featuring Santana and Angélique Kidjo)	Harold Alexander	Hancock; Mintz	5:25
3.	"A Song for You" (featuring Christina Aguilera)	Leon Russell	Hancock; Mintz; Brockmann^{[b]}	7:05
4.	"I Do It for Your Love" (featuring Paul Simon)	Paul Simon	Hancock; Mintz; John Alagía^{[a]}; Simon^{[a]}	5:58
5.	"Hush, Hush, Hush" (featuring Annie Lennox)	Paula Cole	Hancock; Mintz	4:46
6.	"Sister Moon" (featuring Sting)	Sting	Hancock; Mintz	6:54
7.	"When Love Comes to Town" (featuring Jonny Lang and Joss Stone)	Adam Clayton; David Evans; Paul David Hewson; Lawrence Mullen Jr.	Hancock; Mintz; Greg Phillinganes^{[a]}	8:41
8.	"Don't Explain" (featuring Damien Rice and Lisa Hannigan)	Arthur Herzog Jr.; Billie Holiday	Hancock; Mintz	4:53
9.	"I Just Called to Say I Love You" (featuring Raul Midón)	Stevie Wonder	Phillinganes; Hancock	5:27
10.	"Gelo na Montanha" (featuring Trey Anastasio)	Anastasio; Hancock; Cyro Baptista	Hancock; Mintz; Bryce Goggin^{[a]}; Brockmann^{[a]}; Fuchs^{[a]}	3:48

Notes:

- ^{^[a]} signifies a co-producer
- ^{^[b]} signifies an additional producer

DVD-Video (2006)

1. Introduction
2. Christina Aguilera "A Song for You"
3. Opening Credits/John Mayer "Stitched Up"
4. Raul Midón "I Just Called to Say I Love You"
5. Trey Anastasio "Gelo na Montanha (Ice On The Mountain)"
6. Damian Rice & Lisa Hannigan "Don't Explain"
7. Carlos Santana & Angélique Kidjo "Safiatou"
8. Wayne Shorter
9. Paul Simon "I Do It for Your Love"
10. Brian Eno
11. Annie Lennox "Hush, Hush, Hush"
12. Jonny Lang & Joss Stone "When Love Comes to Town"
13. Sting "Sister Moon"
14. Hiroshima, Japan
15. Nagasaki, Japan
16. End Credits

== Charts ==
=== Weekly charts ===
Weekly chart performance for Possibilities
Chart (2005)	Peak position
Australian Hitseekers Albums (ARIA)	17
Australian Jazz & Blues Albums (ARIA)	11
Belgian Albums (Ultratop Wallonia)	45
Dutch Albums (Album Top 100)	33
German Albums (Offizielle Top 100)	80
Italian Albums (FIMI)	74
Swiss Albums (Schweizer Hitparade)	95
UK Jazz & Blues Albums (Official Charts)	23
US Billboard 200	22
US Top Contemporary Jazz Albums (Billboard)	1

=== Year-end charts ===
2005 year-end chart performance for Possibilities
Chart (2005)	Position
US Top Contemporary Jazz Albums (Billboard)	2

2006 year-end chart performance for Possibilities
Chart (2006)	Position
US Top Contemporary Jazz Albums (Billboard)	2

== Certifications ==
Certifications for Possibilities
Region	Certification	Certified units/sales
United States (RIAA)	Gold	500,000^{^}
^{^} Shipments figures based on certification alone.
