= Ivan Lins =

Brazilian musician and songwriter

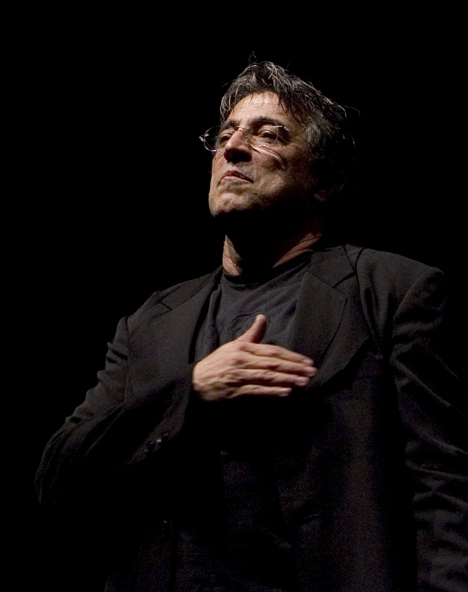
- Ivan Lins, November 2007

Background information
- Born: Ivan Guimarães Lins; 16 June 1945 (age 81); Rio de Janeiro, Brazil
- Genres: Jazz, Latin, Brazilian pop, samba, bossa nova
- Occupations: Singer, musician, songwriter
- Instruments: Vocals, Piano
- Years active: 1960s–present
- Labels: Philips, RCA Victor, EMI, Verve, Reprise, Som Livre, Sony

Ivan Guimarães Lins (born 16 June 1945) is a Latin Grammy-winning Brazilian musician. He has been an active performer and songwriter of Brazilian popular music (MPB) and jazz for over fifty years. His first hit, "Madalena", was recorded by Elis Regina in 1970. "Love Dance", a hit in 1989, is one of the most recorded songs in contemporary music .

His songs have been covered by Patti Austin, David Benoit, George Benson, Michael Bublé, Eliane Elias, Ella Fitzgerald, Dave Grusin, Shirley Horn, Quincy Jones, Steve Kuhn, the Manhattan Transfer, Sérgio Mendes, Jane Monheit, Mark Murphy, Carmen McRae, Joe Pass, Lee Ritenour, Sarah Vaughan, Diane Schuur, Sting, Barbra Streisand, Take 6, Toots Thielemans, Dan Costa (musician) and Nancy Wilson.

== Life ==
Ivan Lins spent several years in Boston, Massachusetts, while his father, a naval engineer, continued graduate studies at M.I.T. Lins studied at the Military College in Rio. He later received a degree in industrial chemical engineering from the Federal University of Rio de Janeiro. He considered a career in volleyball before discovering his considerable musical talent. Ivan Lins currently resides in Rio de Janeiro and Lisbon. He was married to Lucinha Lins, with whom they had two children, including Cláudio Lins.

== Work ==
Ivan Lins has released albums regularly and penned several standards, such as "Love Dance", "Começar de novo" (Starting Over) (the English lyric version is titled "The Island", with lyrics by Alan and Marilyn Bergman) and "Velas Içadas", which have made their way north into the American jazz lexicon. "You Moved Me to This", a duet with Brenda Russell from the same album as "Love Dance", saw modest success on American radio. He recorded in English for Reprise/Warner Bros. Records in the early 1990s.

In the mid-eighties, Lins recorded a jazz fusion album with Dave Grusin and Lee Ritenour titled Harlequin, which was a critical and commercial success. Lins also composed the soundtrack for the Brazilian film Dois Córregos.

Lins' longtime composing partner is Vítor Martins. Their songs typically feature lush harmony with a distinctive jazz sensibility. One signature voicing Lins often employs when performing his own compositions is the delayed addition of a ♯11 to a sus13 chord, or the delayed addition of a ♭9 to a sus13 chord.

Lins appeared as a guest performer on the albums Dois mundos (1998) and Recorded in Rio (2003) by the Dutch artist Josee Koning. He also appeared on the Michael Bublé album Call Me Irresponsible (2007) and with singer/songwriter Paula Cole on her 2007 CD Courage, singing a duet with her on the song "Hard to be Soft". Lins guested on American artist Jane Monheit's album Surrender (2007), which includes his composition "Rio de Maio".

Jazz reporter and music critic David Adler reported Lins's October 2000 Carnegie Hall concert performance and tribute to him. The event corresponded with the tribute album titled A Love Affair, released by Telarc Records. Headline performers from diverse genres participated in celebrating the man and his music on the recording and in the world-class performance hall, a noteworthy accomplishment in the history of any musician.

As of 2018, Lins maintained an intermittent North American tour schedule, including performances at Yoshi's that year (and a decade prior), and in New York City: a 2003 appearance at the Blue Note, and then in May 2008, with Rosa Passos, at Jazz at Lincoln Center.

Beyond performing Lins' compositions, Simone is a notable and respected interpreter of his work.

In 2023, Ivan Lins' Um novo tempo, released in 1980 as a song of resistance against the US-backed Brazilian military regime, was played at Beijing Tiananmen Square to welcome Brazilian President Lula for a state visit. The song was suggested by the Ministry of Foreign Affairs (Brazil). Ivan Lins later said on Twitter: "I'm so emotional! You can't imagine how much this means to me and Vitor [Martins],"

== Awards and honors ==
In 2005, he won two Latin Grammy Awards; Album of the Year and Best MPB (Música popular brasileira) Album for Cantando Histórias. As of 2025, he is the only Brazilian or Portuguese-language artist to win the Latin Grammy for Album of the Year.

In 2009, Lins' album Regência, recorded with the Metropole Orchestra under Vince Mendoza, was nominated for three Latin Grammy Awards. The album was also nominated for Record of the Year (Arlequim Desconhecido) and Album of the Year, and won the award for Best MPB (Música popular brasileira) Album.

In 2015, he was nominated for the 16th Latin Grammy Awards in the Best MPB Album category for his album América Brasil.

Year	Awards	Category	Recipient	Outcome	Ref.
2000	Latin Grammy Awards	Best Pop Instrumental Performance	"Dois córregos"	Nominated	
2002	Latin Grammy Awards	Album of the Year	"Jobiniando"	Nominated	
2005	Latin Grammy Awards	Album of the Year	"Cantando Histórias"	Won	
2005	Latin Grammy Awards	Best MPB Album	"Cantando Histórias"	Won	
2006	Latin Grammy Awards	Best Singer-Songwriter Album	"Acariocando"	Nominated	
2009	Latin Grammy Awards	Record of the Year	"Arlequim desconhecido"	Nominated	
2009	Latin Grammy Awards	Best MPB Album	"Regência: Vince Mendoza"	Won	
2014	Latin Grammy Awards	Best MPB Album	"InventaRio Encontra Ivan Lins"	Nominated	
2015	Latin Grammy Awards	Best MPB Album	"América, Brasil"	Won	

== Discography ==
- Agora (Forma, 1971)
- Deixa o trem seguir (Forma, 1971)
- Quem sou eu (Philips, 1972)
- Modo livre (RCA Victor, 1974)
- Chama acesa (RCA Victor, 1975)
- Somos todos iguais nesta noite (EMI, 1977)
- Nos dias de hoje (EMI, 1978)
- A noite (EMI, 1979)
- Novo tempo (EMI, 1980)
- Daquilo que eu sei (Philips, 1981)
- Depois dos temporais (Philips, 1983)
- Juntos (Philips, 1984)
- Ivan Lins (Som Livre, 1986)
- Mãos (Philips, 1987)
- Amar assim (Philips, 1988)
- Brazilian Knights and a Lady (Verve, 1988)
- Love Dance (Reprise, 1989)
- Awa yiô (Reprise, 1990)
- Anjo de mim (Velas, 1995)
- Ao vivo (Velas, 1996)
- Viva Noel: Tributo a Noel Rosa Vol. 1 (Velas, 1997)
- Viva Noel: Tributo a Noel Rosa Vol. 2 (Velas, 1997)
- Viva Noel: Tributo a Noel Rosa Vol. 3 (Velas, 1997)
- Live at MCG (Heads Up, 1999)
- Um novo tempo (Abril, 1999)
- A cor do pôr-do-sol (Abril, 2000)
- Jobiniando (Abril, 2001)
- Love Songs – A quem me faz feliz (Abril, 2002)
- Cantando Histórias (EMI, 2004)
- Acariocando (EMI, 2006)
- Saudades de casa (Warner, 2007)
- Regência: Vince Mendoza (2009)
- Íntimo (Som Livre, 2010)
- Amoragio (Som Livre, 2012)
- Cornucopia (Moosicus, 2013)
- America, Brazil (Sony, 2014)
- Muito bom tocar junto (Discobertas, 2016)
- Anos 70 (Discobertas, 2017)
- Cumpliciade (Fina Flor, 2017)
