= Dancer in Nowhere =

Studio album by Miho Hazama m_unit
- Released: November 2018
- Recorded: August 22–23, 2018
- Studio: Sound on Sound Studios, New Jersey
- Genre: Jazz
- Label: Verve; Sunnyside

Miho Hazama chronology
The Monk: Live at Bimhuis (2017)	Dancer in Nowhere (2018)	Imaginary Visions (2021)

Professional ratings
Review scores
Source	Rating
DownBeat	4/5 stars

Dancer in Nowhere is an album by Miho Hazama and her chamber orchestra m_unit, released in November 2018.

This album was nominated for Best Large Jazz Ensemble Album at the 62nd Annual Grammy Awards.

== Track listing ==
All compositions by Miho Hazama except as indicated

1. "Today, Not Today" – 8:03
2. "The Cyclic Number" – 8:02
3. "RUN" – 7:06
4. "Somnambulant" – 9:44
5. "Il Paradiso Del Blues" – 8:56
6. "Magyar Dance" – 8:06
7. "Olympic Fanfare and Theme" (John Williams) – 6:08
8. "Dancer in Nowhere" – 8:38

Track listing adapted from Apple Music

== Personnel ==
- Miho Hazama – conductor
- Jonathan Powell – trumpet, flugelhorn
- Adam Unsworth – French horn (track: 2)
- Jason Rigby – tenor saxophone, clarinet (tracks: 1 to 3, 5 to 7)
- Ryoji Ihara – tenor saxophone, clarinet, flute (tracks: 1 to 3, 5 to 7)
- Steve Wilson – alto saxophone, soprano saxophone, flute (track: 2)
- Andrew Gutauskas – baritone saxophone, bass clarinet
- Lionel Loueke – guitar [Guest] (track: 4)
- Billy Test – piano
- James Shipp – vibraphone, guiro, shekere
- Jake Goldbas – drums (tracks: 1 to 7)
- Nate Wood – drums [Guest] (track: 8)
- Sam Anning – bass
- Atsuki Yoshida – viola
- Sita Chay – violin
- Tomoko Akaboshi – violin
- Meaghan Burke – cello
- Kavita Shah – voice (tracks: 4, 6)
