= Regência: Vince Mendoza =

Studio album by Ivan Lins & The Metropole Orchestra
- Released: 2009
- Genre: Musica Popular Brasileira
- Label: Biscoito Fino
- Producers: Ivan Lins & Vince Mendoza

Ivan Lins chronology
Saudades de Casa (2007)	Regência: Vince Mendoza (2009)	Believe What I Say (2014)

Metropole Orchestra chronology
Black Symphony (2008)	Regência: Vince Mendoza (2009)	Crush (2010)

Regência: Vince Mendoza is an album by Ivan Lins and The Metropole Orchestra.

== Track listing ==
1. Daquilo que eu Sei
2. A Gente Merece ser Feliz
3. Formigueiro
4. Arlequim Desconhecido
5. Comecar De Novo
6. Let Us Be Always
7. E Ouro em Po
8. O Fado
9. Ai, Ai, Ai, Ai, Ai
10. Art of Survival
11. Lua Soberana

== Awards ==
=== Latin Grammy Awards ===
The album won the 2009 Latin Grammy for Best MPB (Musica Popular Brasileira) Album. (The title of the album at the awards ceremony was simply "Ivan Lins & The Metropole Orchestra"). The album was also nominated for the following awards:

- Record of the Year: "Arlequim Desconhecido"
- Album of the Year: Regência: Vince Mendoza
