= Raul Midón =

American singer-songwriter

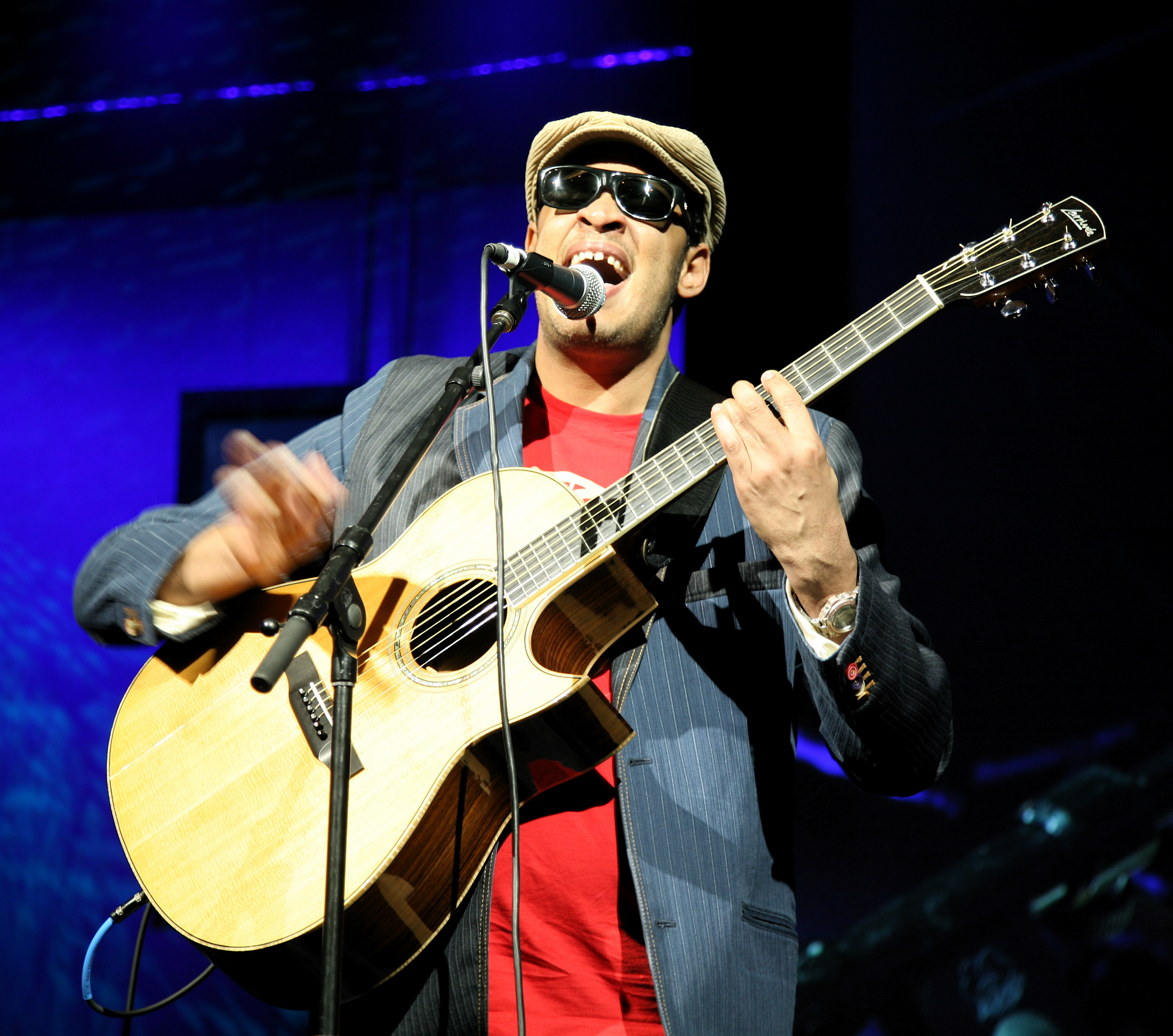
- Raul Midón at TED2007 in 2007

Background information
- Born: March 14, 1966 (age 60); Embudo, New Mexico, U.S.
- Genres: Pop jazz, Latin Jazz, Latin pop
- Occupations: Singer, musician
- Instruments: Guitar, vocals, mouth trumpet
- Years active: 1993–present
- Label: Artistry
- Website: www.raulmidon.com

Raul Midón (born March 14, 1966) is an American singer-songwriter and guitarist from New Mexico.

== Biography ==
=== Early life ===
Midón was born prematurely in a rural hospital in Embudo, New Mexico, to parents of Argentine and African-American descent. His father was a folkloric dancer from Argentina. Midón was raised Catholic.

Midon and his twin brother Marco were blinded as infants after spending time in an incubator without adequate eye protection. The sound of music became integral to Midon's life at age four when his father introduced him to the drum. Midon learned how to play guitar while performing in educational programs at a school for the blind, then at Santa Fe Preparatory School while completing his last two years of high school in 1984. Midon then attended the University of Miami, which he selected for its jazz curriculum. He graduated from the University of Miami in 1990.

=== Career ===
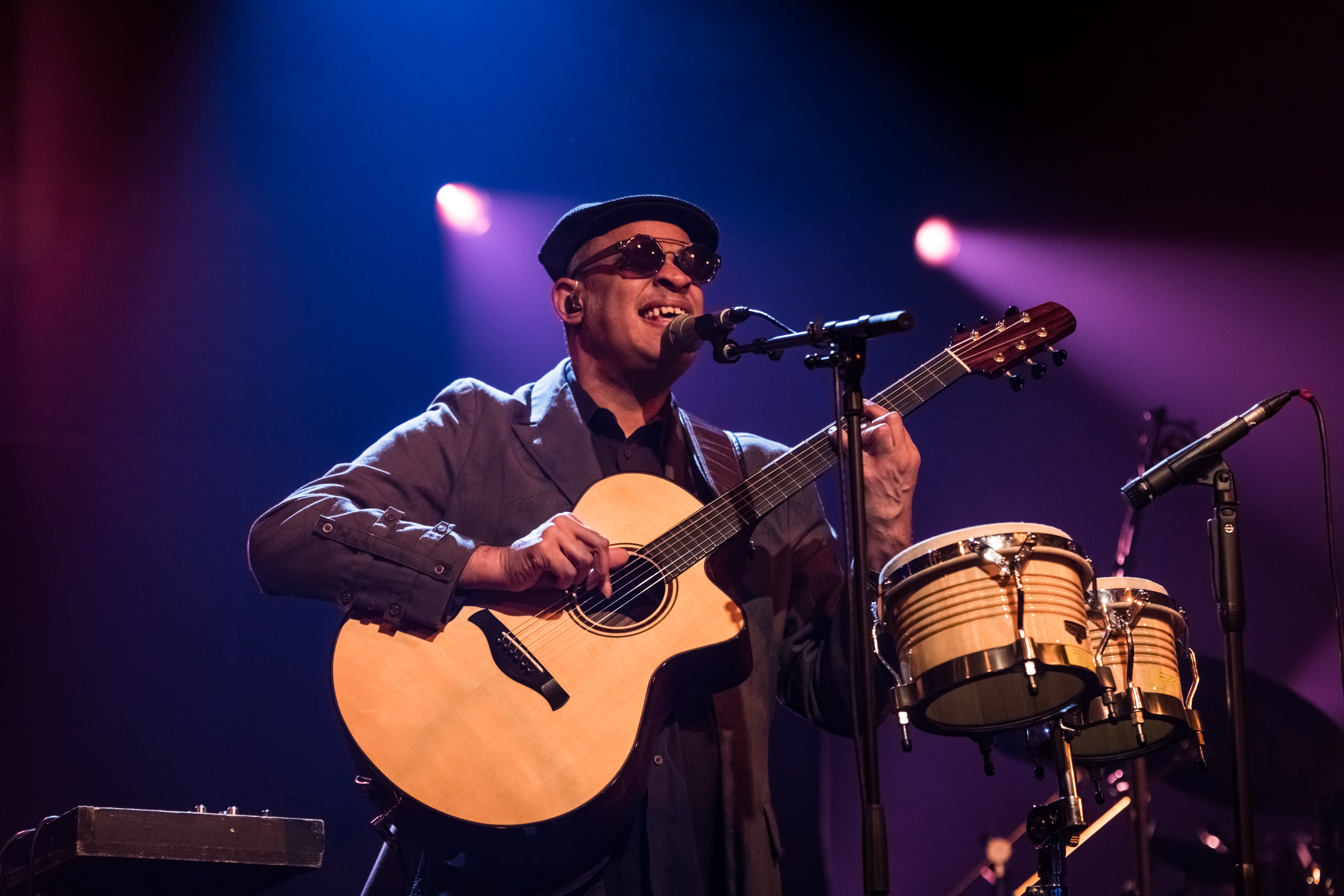
The Raul Midón Trio live @Leverkusener Jazztage 2017

Midon began his career as a session singer for Latin recording artists including Shakira, Alejandro Sanz, Julio Iglesias, and Jose Feliciano. After touring with Shakira, he moved to New York City to pursue a solo career. In New York City he worked with producer and DJ Little Louie Vega. He wrote and recorded several songs, including "Cerca De Mi" with Vega and his production team under the band name Elements of Life. The band was led by Vega and toured Europe, Japan, and Australia during 2003 and 2004.

Midón was signed by Arif Mardin to Manhattan Records. In Mardin's long career, Midon was his first signing of an artist. Mardin and his son Joe produced Midon's debut album, State of Mind (2005). The album featured a guest performance by Stevie Wonder, one of his idols, another one with Jason Mraz, and a song written in tribute to Donny Hathaway entitled "Sittin' in the Middle." Midon is an avid amateur radio enthusiast, who used his call sign (KB5ZOT) using Morse code. Midon released the album A World Within a World on September 25, 2007. Midon sang the song at the credits for Spike Lee's 2004 LGBT film, She Hate Me, titled "Adam n' Eve n' Eve". His song "Everybody" was featured in the soundtrack of the movie The Peaceful Warrior starring Nick Nolte. Midon's national television debut was on the Late Show with David Letterman on June 28, 2005. Herbie Hancock featured Midon on the album Possibilities (2006), performing Stevie Wonder's "I Just Called to Say I Love You".

In 2008 he built a home studio with the help of Cakewalk and the company Dancing Dots, which designs technology for the blind. The studio allowed him to produce music from home without the need of an engineer. Vocals and guitar for his song "Everyone Deserves a Second Chance", which appeared on Cuban pianist Roberto Fonseca's album Akokan, were recorded at his home. He recorded two songs for the Generosity Water project at his home studio, which he calls The Basement Studio.

In 2015, Midon joined the 14th annual Independent Music Awards judging panel. He was also a judge for the 12th and 13th Independent Music Awards. 2017 marked the release of Raul's album Bad Ass And Blind, which was nominated for a Best Jazz Vocal Album. In 2016 he toured the United States under the Monterey Jazz Festival moniker with Gerald Clayton, Nicholas Payton, Gregory Hutchinson, and Joe Sanders. Several of the tunes on this album feature these musicians as well as Lionel Cordew on drums and Richard Hammond on Bass.

2018 Mack Avenue records licensed and released If You Really Want, a recording Raul made with the Metropole Orkest with Vince Mendoza conducting. He received a second Grammy Nomination for this record in the Best Vocal Jazz Album category. Raul also appears as a guest singer on vibraphonist Joe Locke's 2018 release "Subtle Disguise" recording "Motherless Children" and "Who Killed Davey Moore?"

In 2019, Raul received the distinguished alumnus of the year award from the University of Miami. He was also asked to speak at his high school alma mater Santa Fe Prep.

In 2020, Raul released his album "The Mirror" on March 13. Having toured extensively in 2018, the pandemic sidelined him. He used this time to collaborate with various artists, recording and releasing "Hold Tight" by the Latin Broadway composer Jaime Lozano, Rise Up with German DJ and producer Henrik Schwarz, and participating in the re-worked "Along The Watchtower/Breathe" with vibraphonist Joe Locke in honor of the Black Lives Matter movement. As a solo artist he released the singles "Dancing Off The Edge", "Song For America", "Bottom Cycle Blues" and "¿Really Love?". A video was produced for "Dancing Off The Edge" by NadWorks, featuring fans from all over the world dancing to the piece. Raul also contributed to the NPR Tiny Desk Home Edition with a virtual performance recorded in his home studio.

In 2021, Raul's album The Mirror was nominated for a Libera Award/A2IM for best jazz album. He was featured guest on the Grammy winning album "Mendó" by Alex Cuba in the song Camino Y Vez.

During the pandemic Raul recorded his first instrumental album, Eclectic Adventurist, which features guitar duets with Mike Stern, Alex Cuba, Lionel Loueke, Lindsey Blair, Julia Bailen, Dean Parks, Stephane Wrembel, Romero Lubambo and Marvin Sewell. It was released 11/2022 on his own label ReKondite ReKords.

In 2022 Raul appeared at the Kennedy Center with the NSO, conducted by Vince Mendoza with Lalah Hathaway, Jimmie Herrod, Renee Fleming etc. The show was taped for PBS and later aired on the show Next At The Kennedy Center Season One, Episode 2.

In 2023 Raul recorded his 13th solo studio album, Lost & Found. The first single "Keep On Keeping On" was released on December 22, 2023.

== Discography ==
=== As leader ===
- Gracias a La Vida (RCA, 1999)
- Blind to Reality (self-released, 2001)
- Live Limited Edition (self-released, 2004)
- State of Mind (Manhattan, 2005)
- A World Within a World (Manhattan, 2007)
- Synthesis (Decca, 2009)
- Invisible Chains Live from NYC (self-released, 2012)
- Don't Hesitate (Artistry Music, 2014)
- Bad Ass and Blind (Artistry Music, 2017)
- If You Really Want (Artistry Music, 2018)
- The Mirror (Mack Avenue, 2020)
- Eclectic Adventurist (ReKondite Rekords, 2022)
- Lost & Found (ReKondite Rekords, 2024)

=== As sideman ===
- Queen Latifah, The Dana Owens Album (A&M, 2004)
- Herbie Hancock, Herbie Hancock: Possibilities (Hear Music, 2005)
- Snoop Dogg, Tha Blue Carpet Treatment (Geffen, 2006)
- Marcus Miller, A Night In Monte-Carlo (Dreyfus Jazz, 2010)

=== Soundtracks ===
- Terence Blanchard, She Hate Me: Music From The Motion Picture (Milan, 2004)
- Peaceful Warrior (Lakeshore, 2006)

=== Documentaries ===
- Herbie Hancock: Possibilities (DVD) (2006)
- Bill Withers Still Bill (2011)
- The Greatest Ears in Town: The Arif Mardin Story (2013)
- An Evening With Eric Holder (2017)
