= Magda Giannikou =

Greek composer, film scorer, singer, pianist, and accordionist (born 1981)

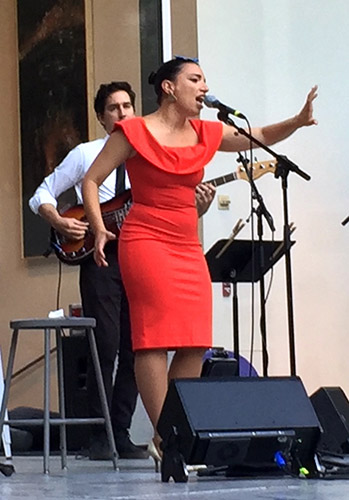
- Born: January 27, 1981 (age 45); Athens, Greece
- Occupations: Musician, composer
- Years active: 2003–present
- Known for: Musician

Magda Giannikou is a Greek composer, film scorer, singer, pianist, and accordionist.

== Early life and education ==
Giannikou was born on 27 January 1981, in Athens, Greece. She taught in Greek elementary schools and composed music for TV and theater productions in Athens. In Greece, she participated in over 50 children's productions and began her training in classical music and jazz. Giannikou graduated from the National Conservatory of Greece with a Certificate of Excellence. She also studied at the Philippos Nakas Conservatory in Athens.

Giannikou went on to study film scoring at Berklee College of Music in Boston, Massachusetts, USA, graduating in 2008. In 2009, Giannikou was selected to be a Fellow at the Sundance Institute Composers Lab.

== Career ==
In 2010, Giannikou formed Banda Magda, a New York-based band, with an international group of musicians, including some fellow Berklee alumni. Their multilingual music is influenced by Latin American styles (such as samba), French chansons and Greek folk music. Banda Magda has toured in 22 countries. Their 2013 album, Amour, t'es la?, reached #9 on Billboard's Top World Music Albums chart.

=== Filmography ===
Giannikou has composed music for several films and a TV show:

- 2014: Watchers of the Sky
- 2012: Louie
- 2011: Natural Selection
- 2010: La tropa de trapo en el país donde siempre brilla el sol

In 2016 Giannikou was the recording producer for the second season of Mobile Suit Gundam: Iron-Blooded Orphans.
