= Metropole Orkest =

Dutch jazz and pop orchestra

- Jazz orchestra
- Founded: 1945; 81 years ago
- Location: Hilversum, Netherlands
- Principal conductor: Jules Buckley
- Website: Official website

The Metropole Orkest (transl. Metropole Orchestra) is a jazz and pop orchestra based in the Netherlands, and is the largest full-time ensemble of its kind in the world. A hybrid orchestra, it combines jazz, big band and classical symphony orchestra styles. Comprising between 52 and 97 musicians, it is versatile across many musical forms, and is equipped with a "double rhythm section" – one for pop and rock, and one for jazz based music.

== History ==
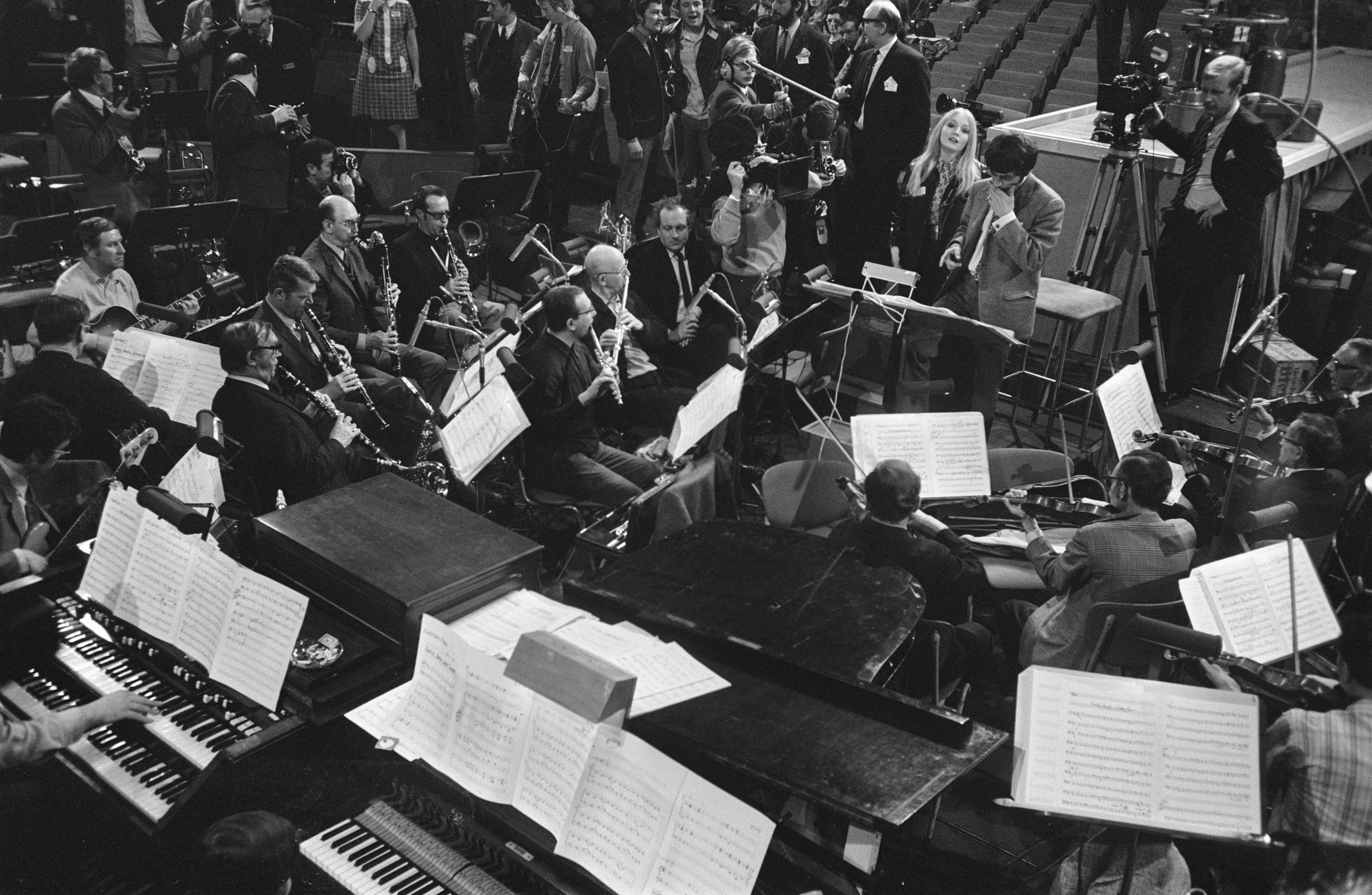
Eurovision Song Contest 1970 rehearsals

The Metropole Orkest was founded in 1945 by Dolf van der Linden at the urging of officials from Netherlands Public Broadcasting, which manages and subsidizes the orchestra. The name of the group was suggested by van der Linden, one of the musicians, who led the ensemble for 35 years until he stepped down in 1980. He was replaced by Rogier van Otterloo, who led the group until his sudden death in 1988. Dick Bakker then held the baton until 2005, when Vince Mendoza took over. He gave the orchestra a more international character. In August 2013, Jules Buckley took over the position of chief conductor from Mendoza.

The Metropole Orkest is a regular feature at the North Sea Jazz festival and the annual Holland Festival along with many TV and radio programs. The Dutch film and television industry relies heavily on the Metropole Orkest for its film scores. From 2005 to 2013 the Metropole was under the baton of four-time Grammy Award winner Vince Mendoza and performed frequently on the concert stage, at festivals and on recordings of both Dutch and international artists.

In European radio broadcasting, its closest counterparts are the BBC Concert Orchestra, and in particular the now defunct BBC Radio Orchestra which had similar instrumentation. The ensembles often performed with the same guest conductors and soloists, using the same bespoke arrangements.

The Metropole Orkest is known for its performances of world music and classic jazz works. It has worked with many prominent artists, including Ella Fitzgerald, Adrian Belew, Dizzy Gillespie, Al Jarreau, New York Voices, Tori Amos, Bono, Brian Eno, Hardwell, Elvis Costello, Within Temptation, Snarky Puppy, Marcus Miller, Todd Rundgren, Jacob Collier, Markus Stockhausen, Louis Cole, Triptykon, Cory Wong, Cory Henry, Basement Jaxx and Robbie Williams.

The Dutch government was considering withdrawing funding from the orchestra but, at the last minute, in December 2012, politicians secured funding for the orchestra until 2017.

Starting on 31 January 2017, an online survey was held to select a group for a joint project. Six months later, Epica was elected from 650 suggestions, winning the most of 60,000 votes. Without revealing the title of the existing Epica song that was to be recorded, a joint studio session was scheduled to take place in Hilversum on 13 December 2017.

In the build-up to a Dutch parliamentary debate on the culture budgets, scheduled for 30 May 2018, the Metropole Orkest announced that by 2018 the subsidy budget cuts in the preceding years had caused a 50% reduction in the amount of work the orchestra could offer its musicians. Many of its musicians were no longer able to make a living from just their work at the orchestra, and faced problems combining the irregular work hours as a musician with part-time jobs needed to supplement their income. The orchestra objected to the situation as described, responding that it feared that the orchestra would diminish in quality or ultimately be forced to shut down completely.

== Chief conductors ==
- Dolf van der Linden 1945–1980
- Rogier van Otterloo 1980–1988
- Dick Bakker 1991–2005
- Vince Mendoza 2005–2013
- Jules Buckley 2013–2020, 2023–present

== Honorary conductors ==
- Vince Mendoza 2013 – present
- Jules Buckley 2020 – 2023

== Permanent guest conductor ==
- Miho Hazama 2020 – present

== Selected discography ==
Year	Album	Peak positions								Certifications
Year	Album	AUT	BEL (Vl)	BEL (Wa)	FIN	FRA	GER	NED	SWI	Certifications
1998	The Latin Side: Credited to: Clare Fischer met het Metropole Orkest; Released: September 1998; Record label: Koch Jazz	—	—	—	—	—	—	—	—	
2001	Live Met Het Metropole Orkest: Credited to: Acda en De Munnik met het Metropole Orkest; Released: July 2001; Record label: Sony Music Local	—	—	—	—	—	—	14	—	
2004	MetroPaul: Live In Het Concertgebouw: Credited to: Paul de Leeuw and The Metropole Orkest; Released: May 1, 2004; Record label: Universal Music B.V.	—	—	—	—	—	—	35	—	
2006	My Flame Burns Blue: Credited to: Elvis Costello with The Metropole Orkest; Released: February 28, 2006; Record label: Deutsche Grammophon	—	—	—	—	—	—	68	—	
2006	The Look of Love: Burt Bacharach Songbook: Credited to: Trijntje Oosterhuis & Metropole Orchestra; Released: November 20, 2006; Record label: Blue Note, EMI	—	27	—	—	—	—	1	—	NVPI: 2× Platinum
2007	Sound Theories Vol. I & II: Credited to: Steve Vai with The Metropole Orkest; Released: June 26, 2007; Record label: Epic / Red Ink	—	—	—	—	—	—	—	—	
2007	Who'll Speak for Love: Burt Bacharach Songbook II: Credited to: Trijntje Oosterhuis & Metropole Orchestra; Released: December 8, 2007; Record label: EMI	—	—	—	—	—	—	2	—	NVPI: 2× Platinum
2008	The Big Band Theory: Credited to: Barry Hay Metropole Big Band; Released: September 8, 2008; Record label: Blue Note	—	—	—	—	—	—	2	—	
2008	Black Symphony: Credited to: Within Temptation & The Metropole Orkest; Recorded live on February 7, 2008; Released: September 22, 2008; Record label: Roadrunner, GUN Records	36	16	24	32	77	17	3	25	
2009	Ivan Lins & The Metropole Orchestra: Credited to: Ivan Lins with The Metropole Orkest; Released: August 2009; Record label: Discmedi	—	—	—	—	—	—	—	—	Won Best Brazilian Album at the 10th Annual Latin Grammy Awards.
2009	Tears Go By: Credited to: Anita Meyer with Metropole Orkest; Released: October 23, 2009; Record label: T2 Entertainment	—	—	—	—	—	—	54	—	
2009	In Een Ander Licht: Credited to: Stef Bos En Het Metropole Orkest O.L.V. Jules Buckley; Released: November 8, 2009; Record label: Niemandsland	—	—	—	—	—	—	24	—	
2010	Crush: Credited to: Ivan Paduart & The Metropole Orkest; Feat. Bob Malach (ten sax) & Fay Claassen (voc.); Recorded live in Brussels in 2008; Released: March 15, 2010; Record label: Mons Records MR 874495	—	—	—	—	—	—	—	—	
2010	54: Credited to: Metropole Orkest, conducted by Vince Mendoza featuring John Scofield; Released: May 10, 2010; Record label: Emarcy	—	—	—	—	—	—	—	—	A nomination for Best Large Jazz Ensemble Album and Best Instrumental Arrangement went to Vince Mendoza for arranging "Carlos", a track on this album, at the 53rd Annual Grammy Awards.
2010	Alive Till I'm Dead: Credited to: Professor Green; Orchestral arrangements by :Jules Buckley; performed by: Metropole Orkest; Released: June 25, 2010; Record label: Virgin Records	—	—	—	—	—	—	—	—	BPI: Gold
2010	Moke + Metropole Orkest: Credited to: Moke + Metropole Orkest conducted by Jules Buckley; Released: October 24, 2010; Record label: Pias Holland	—	—	—	—	—	—	11	—	
2010	A Tribute to Billie Holiday: Credited to: Ruth Jacott en het Metropole Orkest; Released: November 16, 2010; Record label: V&V Content	—	—	—	—	—	—	41	—	
2011	Basement Jaxx vs. Metropole Orkest: Credited to: Basement Jaxx & The Metropole Orkest; Released: July 11, 2011; Record label: Atlantic Jaxx Recordings Ltd.	—	—	—	—	—	—	—	—	
2011	Live with The Metropole Orchestra: Credited to: Alain Clark with The Metropole Orkest; Released: December 12, 2011; Record label: 8ball Music	—	—	—	—	—	—	39	—	
2012	The Wine of Silence: Credited to: Robert Fripp, Andrew Keeling and David Singleton, performed by The Metropole Orkest, conducted by Jan Stulen; Recorded: June 28, 2003; Released: April 30, 2012; Record label: Discipline Global Mobile	—	—	—	—	—	—	98	—	
2012	Better Get Hit in Your Soul: A Tribute to the Music of Charles Mingus: Credited to: Metropole Orkest, conducted by John Clayton, featuring Randy Brecker, Ronnie Cuber, and Conrad Herwig; Recorded: April 27, 2009; Released: July 10, 2012 (CD, DVD-Video); Record label: BHM Productions	—	—	—	—	—	—	—	—	
2012	Gold Dust: Credited to: Jonathan Jeremiah with The Metropole Orkest); Released: October 22, 2012; Record label: Island Records	—	49	—	—	42	84	12	45	
2013	Markus Stockhausen and The Metropole Orkest: Credited to: Markus Stockhausen and The Metropole Orkest; Recorded: June 25, 2011; Released: March 1, 2013; Record label: Intuition	—	—	—	—	—	—	—	—	
2013	Sweet Soul Music: Credited to: Edsilia Rombley with The Metropole Orkest; Released: April 12, 2013; Record label: D.E.M.P.	—	—	—	—	—	—	7	—	
2013	Lean on Me: Credited to: Sabrina Starke; Musicians: Vince Mendoza with The Metrople Orchestra; Released: May 2, 2013; Record label: 8ball Music	—	—	—	—	—	—	8	—	
2013	Perfect Vision – The Esquivel Sound: Credited to: The Metropole Orkest; Recorded: 2012; Released: June 10, 2013; Record label: Basta Audio-Visuals	—	—	—	—	—	—	—	—	Nominated for Edison Award for World Music
2013	Amsterdam Meets New Tango: Credited to: Pablo Ziegler and The Metropole Orkest; Recorded: April 18, 2009; Released: June 11, 2013; Record label: Zoho Music	—	—	—	—	—	—	—	—	
2014	Live in Holland: Credited to: Asha Bhosle and Metropole Orchestra; Recorded: May 9, 2013; Released: April 11, 2014; Record label: Amstel	—	—	—	—	—	—	—	—	
2014	At Abbey Road Studios: Credited to: Laura Mvula with Metropole Orkest; Released: June 2014 (digital download); Released: August 2014 (CD, vinyl); Record label: RCA	—	184	155	—	—	—	26	—	Nominated for BBC Sound of 2013. Also nominated for the Critics' Choice Award at the 2013 Brit Awards.
2015	Karmaflow: The Rock Opera Videogame – The Original Soundtrack: Credited to: The Metropole Orkest; Released: April 30, 2015 (CD, digital download); Record Label: BaseCamp Games	—	—	—	—	—	—	—	—	
2015	Sylva: Credited to: Snarky Puppy & The Metropole Orkest; Recorded: April 19–20, 2014; Released: May 26, 2015 (CD); Record Label: Impulse!	—	118	161	—	131	—	20	—	Won the Grammy Award for Best Contemporary Instrumental Album at the 58th Annual Grammy Awards (2016).
2015	Clear Day: Credited to: Emilie-Claire Barlow with The Metropole Orkest; Released: October 23, 2015 (CD); Record Label: Empress Music Group	—	—	—	—	—	—	—	—	Won the Juno Award for Vocal Jazz Album of the Year in 2016.
2016	Compleet, Volmaakt, Het Einde: Credited to: Gordon, The Metropole Orkest; Released: November 2016 (CD, digital download); Record Label: Berk Music	—	104	—	—	—	—	8	—	
2017	MO x Caro Emerald by Grandmono: Credited to: Metropole Orkest x Caro Emerald; Released: December 2017 (CD); Record Label: Grandmono							52		
2018	The Monk: Live at Bimhuis: Credited to Miho Hazama, The Metropole Orkest Big Band; Recorded live at Bimhuis, Amsterdam in October 2017; Released: February 14, 2018 (CD); Record Label: Universal Music/Verve, Sunnyside							—		
2018	Scripted Orkestra: Credited to: Henrik Schwarz & Metropole Orkest; Released: May 25, 2018 (CD, LP); Record Label: 7k!							—		Nominated for Best Classical Album at the 2019 A2IM Libera Awards.
2018	If You Really Want: Credited to: Raul Midón with The Metropole Orkest; Recorded: June 30 – July 4, 2014; Released: September 14, 2018 (CD); Record Label: Artistry Music							—		Nominated for Best Jazz Vocal Album at the 61st Annual Grammy Awards.
2018	What Heat: Credited to: Bokanté + The Metropole Orkest, conducted by Jules Buckley; Recorded :January 6–8, 2018; Released: September 28, 2018 (CD, digital download, LP); Record Label: Real World									Nominated for Best World Music Album at the 62nd Annual Grammy Awards.
2018	Djesse Vol. 1: Credited to: Jacob Collier with Metropole Orchestra; Released: December 7, 2018 (digital download, streaming); Record Label: Hajanga, Decca, Geffen									"All Night Long" won Best Arrangement, Instrumental and Vocals at the 62nd Annual Grammy Awards.
2019	Melkweg: Credited to: Jameszoo Quintet and Metropole Orchestra, conducted by Jules Buckley; Released: May 17, 2019 (digital download); Record Label: Brainfeeder									
2020	Brian Eno with Metropole Orkest: Credited to: Brian Eno with Metropole Orkest; Recorded: June 20, 1999; Released: December 4, 2020; Record label: Unicorn (unofficial release)	—	—	—	—	—	—	—	—	
2020	Live with the Metropole Orkest: Credited to: Sohn, Metropole Orkest; Released: June 5, 2020 (LP, digital download); Record Label: 4AD									
2021	Ledisi Sings Nina: Credited to: Ledisi; Released: July 23, 2021 (digital download, streaming, vinyl); Record Label: Listen Back Entertainment									
2022	XXV: Credited to: Robbie Williams; Released: September 9, 2022 (CD, cassette, digital download, streaming, vinyl); Record Label: Columbia									

== Awards ==
Year	Award	Production
2009	10th Annual Latin Grammy Awards	Best MPB Album: Ivan Lins & The Metropole Orchestra, with Ivan Lins
2016	58th Annual Grammy Awards	Best Contemporary Instrumental Album: Sylva with Snarky Puppy
2020	62nd Annual Grammy Awards	Best arrangement, instruments and vocals: "All night long" with Jacob Collier and Take 6

In the 53rd Annual Grammy Awards of 2011, Best Instrumental Arrangement went to Vince Mendoza for arranging Carlos, a track from the album 54 which the Metropole had recorded with John Scofield.

In 1996, the Metropole Orchestra performed the score of Antonia, a film which won the Oscar for Best Foreign Language Film. They all also featured in "All Night Long" by Jacob Collier which won an award for the "Best Arrangement, Instruments and Vocals" at the 62nd Annual Grammy Awards.
