= Hyogo Performing Arts Center Orchestra =

Hyogo Performing Arts Center Orchestra (HPACO)
- Orchestra
- Founded: 2005
- Location: Nishinomiya, Japan
- Principal conductor: Yutaka Sado
- Website: hpac-orc.jp

The Hyogo Performing Arts Center Orchestra (兵庫県立芸術文化センター管弦楽団, Hyōgo-kenritsu Geijutsu Bunka Sentā Kangengakudan) is a professional orchestra in the city of Nishinomiya, Hyōgo Prefecture, Japan. Founded concurrently with the Hyogo Performing Arts Center in 2005, the Hyogo Performing Arts Center Orchestra (HPAC Orchestra) is under the leadership of Yutaka Sado.

== History ==
In 2002, Sado Yutaka became the artistic director of Hyogo Performing Arts Center. He held auditions for over 900 in 13 worldwide locations after advertising for talent, under the age of 35 in Asia, the United States, and France. He ended up with 48 members with most of them Japanese and an average age of 27. They were assembled only 2 months before opening so in order to build cohesion, they stayed in the same apartment building (owned by the prefecture).

== Performances ==
The orchestra gives roughly 120 performances per season, many of which are at the Hyogo Performing Arts Center. These include the Subscription Series (three performances per week of one program), Masterworks Concerts (one performance per week), Children's and Family Concerts, Recital Series (featuring select members of the orchestra), School "Waku waku" concerts (performed with narrator, these concerts demonstrate each instrument individually and feature at least one large programmatic work) and Chamber Music.

In addition to this, the orchestra participates in an annual performance of Beethoven's Ninth Symphony featuring a 10,000 person choir (sponsored by Suntory and held at Osaka-jō Hall) and makes at least one annual appearance on TV Asahi's weekly television program "[Untitled Concert]" (Japanese: 題名のない音楽会).

== Members ==
The orchestra employees a fixed number of core members (selected through auditions held around the world) in addition to "associate" and "affiliate" members.

== Training element ==
Although it is first and foremost a professionally performing orchestra, the HPAC Orchestra was founded with the aim of having a training element as well. It is only similar to other training orchestras (such as the New World Symphony Orchestra) in that there is a limited contract length (three years) and age limit (35 at time of signing the contract).
