= Hyogo Performing Arts Center =

Performing arts center in Nishinomiya, Hyōgo Prefecture, Japan

Coordinates: 34.7436°N 135.356°E

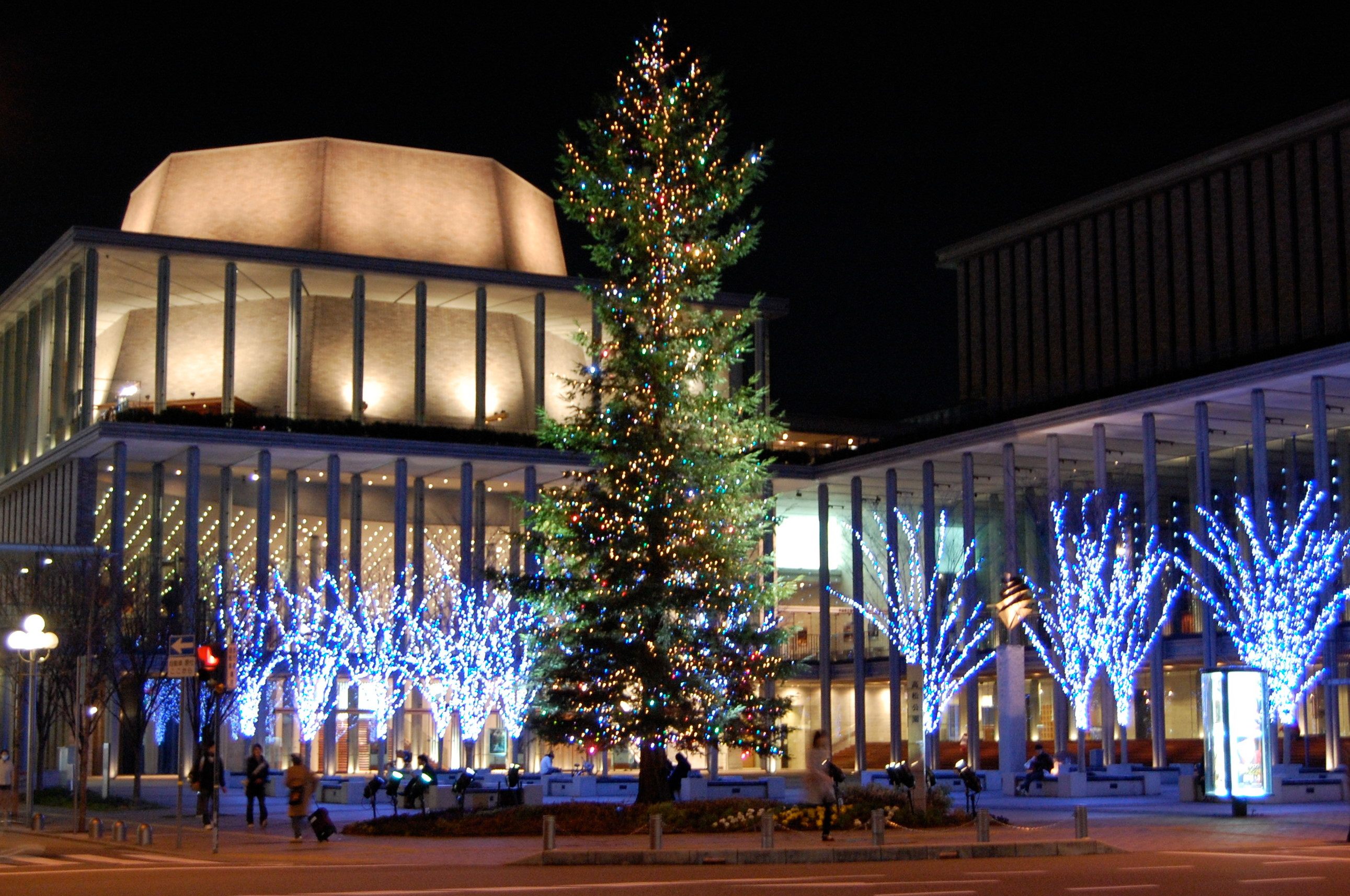
The Hyogo Performing Arts Center

The Hyogo Performing Arts Center (HPAC) (兵庫県立芸術文化センター, Hyōgo-kenritsu Geijutsu Bunka Sentā) is a performing arts center in the city of Nishinomiya, Hyōgo Prefecture, Japan, next to Nishinomiya-Kitaguchi Station operated by Hankyu Corporation. The Center was opened in 2005 to mark the ten-year anniversary of the Great Hanshin earthquake which largely devastated Nishinomiya and the surrounding cities.

The HPAC produces opera, ballet, theater, orchestral and chamber music performances, and is home to the Hyogo Performing Arts Center Orchestra.

Architectural design is by Nikken Sekkei with acoustical engineering by Nagata Acoustics. The architectural design received an Architectural Institute of Japan Architectural Design Commendation in 2007.

== Logo ==
HPAC's logo

Representing "Rebirth", "Liveliness" and "Creativity", the logo aims to embody the HPAC's goal to serve as a venue for interaction between the community and artists through cultural and artistic events. The logo is designed so it can be viewed from any orientation.

== Facilities ==
The Hyogo Performing Arts Center contains three performance venues, all of which are connected by the main public lobby, or piazza. The Center features two restaurants: Igrek Theatre, a French restaurant for patrons of the Center, and an artist cafe for employees and performers. In an effort to offset the Center's carbon footprint, the building's roof contains solar panels and a garden. Rainwater is recycled for use in watering the rooftop garden.

The HPAC features state of the art audio electronic systems produced by d&b audiotechnik and L'Acoustics.

All areas of the Hyogo Performing Arts Center are handicapped accessible.

=== Grand Hall ===
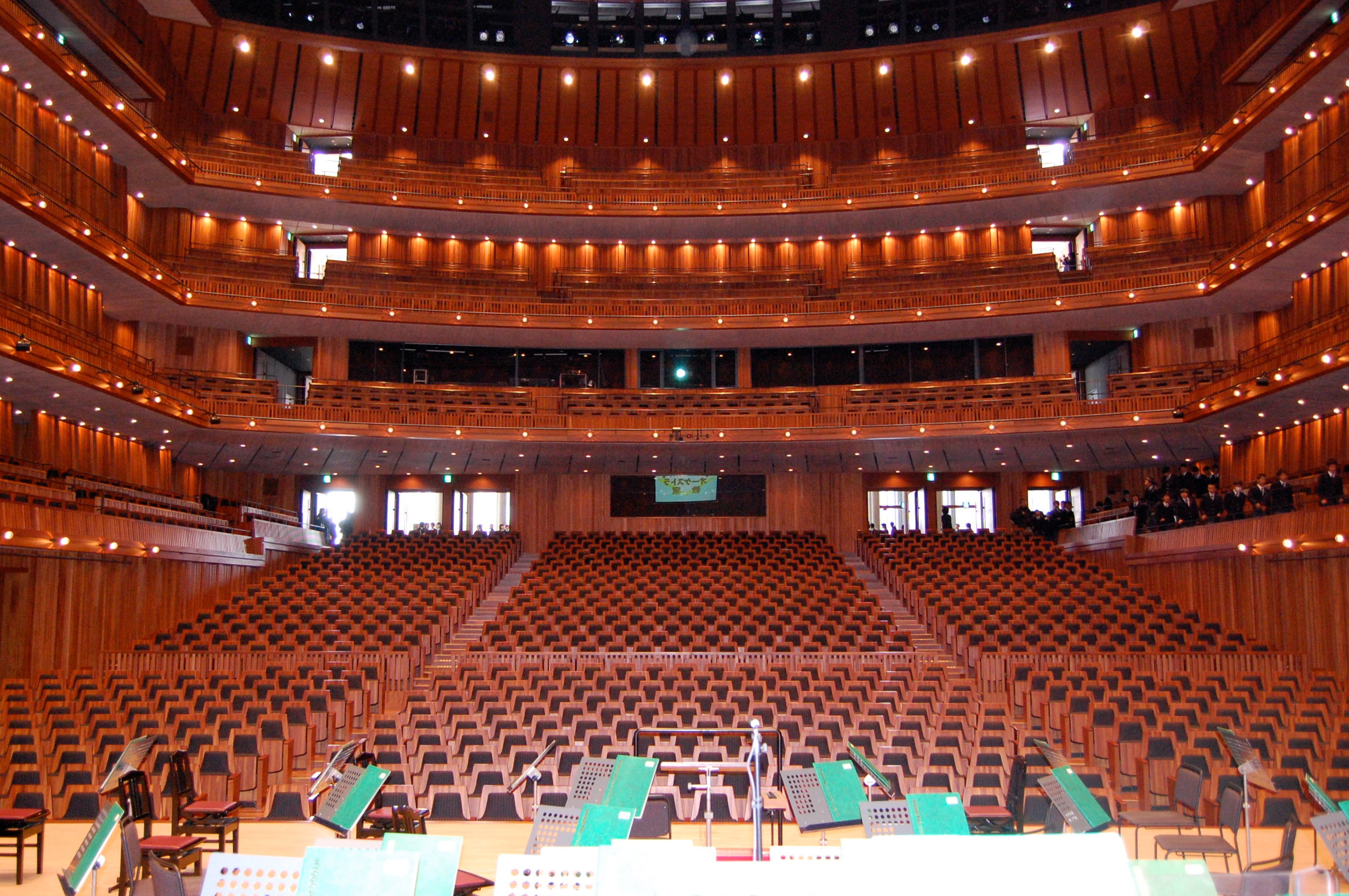
HPAC Grand Hall

Seating up to 2001 audience members, the Grand Hall (大ホール) is used for orchestral, ballet and opera performances. The interior is almost entirely wood, designed for optimal acoustics. Audience members can sit on the inclined floor seating area, or in one of the hall's four balconies.

For opera and ballet performances, the rear shell of the stage can be removed to access the halls abundant fly-space and wings. Several rows of audience seats can be removed to reveal a spacious, hydraulic-powered orchestra pit.

After the naming rights were purchased by Kobe Steel, Ltd. in October 2008, the Grand Hall officially became known as "KOBELCO Grand Hall (KOBELCO 大ホール)."

=== Recital Hall ===
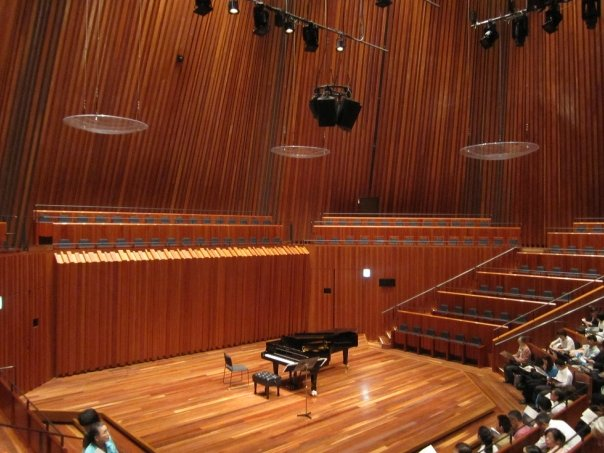
HPAC Recital Hall

Designed for intimate chamber music performances, recitals and jazz concerts, the Recital Hall (小ホール) seats 417 people in an arena-style setting. The flat, octagonal stage is the lowest area in the hall, with the seating rising stadium-style around it. Acoustic sound panels can be raised and lowered from the ceiling to control reverberation time.

After the naming rights were purchased by Kobe College in October 2008, the Recital Hall officially became known as "Kobe College Recital Hall (神戸女学院 小ホール)."

=== Theater ===
The theater (中ホール) can accommodate a variety of events, including plays, musicals, concerts of traditional music. The design of the audience seating allows for maximum numbers of spectators (800 seats) in a compact, intimate environment (the distance between the last row of audience members and the stage is a mere 20 meters.) The ceiling and walls are constructed from cedar wood.

After the naming rights were purchased by Hankyu Corporation in March 2009, the Theater officially became known as "Hankyu Theater (阪急 中ホール)."

=== Additional facilities ===
The HPAC also houses all of the offices required for running the Center and its events, as well as the offices of the HPAC Orchestra. Additionally, there is a large rehearsal room designed to replicate the acoustics of the Grand Hall, a small rehearsal room, and several practice rooms.
