= 62nd Annual Grammy Awards =

2020 US music awards ceremony

- Official poster
- Date: January 26, 2020; 5:00–8:40 p.m. PST
- Location: Staples Center; Los Angeles, California
- Hosted by: Alicia Keys

Highlights
- Most awards: Finneas (6)
- Most nominations: Lizzo (8)
- Website: 62nd Annual Grammy Awards

Television/radio coverage
- Network: CBS
- Viewership: 18.7 million

The 62nd Annual Grammy Awards ceremony was held on January 26, 2020, at the Staples Center in Los Angeles. It recognized the best recordings, compositions, and artists of the eligibility year, running from October 1, 2018, to August 31, 2019. Alicia Keys hosted the ceremony, having hosted the previous year's ceremony as well.

Lizzo received the most nominations of any artist with eight, followed by Billie Eilish and Lil Nas X with six each, with Eilish becoming the youngest person to be nominated in all the four major categories, at 17 years old. Finneas, Eilish's brother, received the most awards with six, followed by Eilish herself with five. Eilish became the second person (after Christopher Cross in 1981) and first female artist to win the four major categories of Record of the Year, Album of the Year, Song of the Year, and Best New Artist in the same year. She also became the youngest person to win Album of the Year, Record of the Year, and Best Pop Vocal Album, at 18 years old, as well as the first person born in the 21st century to win a Grammy award. Finneas became the youngest person to win Producer of the Year, at 22 years old.

Ten days prior to the ceremony, Recording Academy president Deborah Dugan was relieved of her duties as president and CEO and placed on administrative leave from the organization. She sparked controversy by claiming that the organization engaged in corruption and favoritism; Champagne Billecart-Salmon responded by pulling their ads from the broadcast, and Megyn Kelly, Gabrielle Union, and others tweeted their support of Dugan. The ceremony was held on the same day as the death of basketball player Kobe Bryant, to whose memory Keys and Boyz II Men dedicated their performance of "It's So Hard to Say Goodbye to Yesterday".

== Background and controversy ==
After many years of being traditionally held in February (except during the years of the Winter Olympics), the 62nd Grammy Awards ceremony was moved to the last Sunday in January, following the Academy Awards' decision to move their 2020 ceremony to the second Sunday in February. Nominations were announced in all 84 categories by Gayle King, Alicia Keys, and Bebe Rexha on the set of CBS This Morning on November 20, 2019.

This was set to be the first edition of the Grammy Awards that the new Recording Academy president Deborah Dugan would have presided over; however, she was relieved of her duties as president and CEO and placed on administrative leave from the organization ten days before the ceremony. The Academy launched an investigation into allegations that Dugan bullied an assistant. After her dismissal, Dugan sparked controversy by claiming that the Recording Academy engaged in favoritism and corruption during the Grammy nomination process. Taylor Swift reportedly cancelled a planned surprise performance of her song "The Man" at the ceremony in solidarity with Dugan, although both Swift and Grammys producer Ken Ehrlich denied this. Recording Academy chairman Harvey Mason Jr. took over as interim president and chief executive officer and presided over the ceremony instead of Dugan.

The ceremony was held at the Staples Center on the same day as the death of basketball player Kobe Bryant, who played for the Los Angeles Lakers—the arena is the team's home venue. Several tributes to Bryant were included in the ceremony, including a performance of "It's So Hard to Say Goodbye to Yesterday" by host Alicia Keys and Boyz II Men, while Lil Nas X, Lizzo and DJ Khaled all incorporated tributes to Bryant into their performances.

=== Category changes ===
For the 62nd Annual Grammy Awards, multiple categories were changed.

- As of the 62nd Grammy Awards, the Recording Academy would accept links to streaming services as opposed to physical copies as submissions. The Academy stated: "For most categories, we would prefer streaming distribution links for online entry submissions, though CD submissions remain optional". As justification for this development, the Academy highlighted the changing music industry and added that submitting links was more convenient and cost effective, especially for smaller and independent labels.
- Additionally, there were separate screening committees for Pop and Rock, whereas previously these categories were screened by a Core Committee. This leaves the Core Committee to focus on the more difficult decisions such as determining who is eligible for the Best New Artist category and trying to find the best home for borderline genre entries.
- The definition of the Grammy Award for Best Traditional Pop Vocal Album had been expanded to accept "contemporary pop songs performed in traditional pop style – the term "traditional" being a reference to the style of the composition, vocal styling and the instrumental arrangement without regard to the age of the material". The Academy stated that broadening the category was done in an attempt to allow it to "remain robust and inclusive" and enable it to be more competitive as, for example, Tony Bennett has won the award 13 times.
- Spoken word recordings targeted at children had been moved from the Best Children's Album category to the Best Spoken Word Album.
- As of the 62nd Grammy Awards, Spanish-language Latin Gospel and Christian music would be officially welcomed in the Best Gospel Album, Best Contemporary Christian Music Album, Best Roots Gospel Album, Best Gospel Performance/Song and Best Contemporary Christian Music Performance/Song categories.

== Performers ==
=== Premiere ceremony ===
Artist(s)	Song
Chick Corea and the Spanish Heart Band	House Band
I'm with Her	"Call My Name"
Angélique Kidjo	"Afirika"
Nicola Benedetti	Instrumental
Yola	"Faraway Look"

=== Main ceremony ===
Artist(s)	Song(s)
Lizzo	"Cuz I Love You" "Truth Hurts"
Alicia Keys; Boyz II Men	Tribute to Kobe Bryant "It's So Hard to Say Goodbye to Yesterday"
Blake Shelton; Gwen Stefani	"Nobody but You"
Alicia Keys	Tribute to nominated artists to the tune of "Someone You Loved" by Lewis Capaldi
Jonas Brothers	"Five More Minutes" "What a Man Gotta Do"
Tyler, the Creator; Boyz II Men; Charlie Wilson	"Earfquake" "New Magic Wand"
Usher; FKA Twigs; Sheila E.	Tribute to Prince "Little Red Corvette" "When Doves Cry" "Kiss"
Camila Cabello	"First Man"
Tanya Tucker; Brandi Carlile	"Bring My Flowers Now"
Ariana Grande	"Imagine" "My Favorite Things" "7 Rings" "Thank U, Next"
Billie Eilish; Finneas	"When the Party's Over"
Aerosmith; Run-DMC	"Livin' on the Edge" "Walk This Way"
Lil Nas X Billy Ray Cyrus; BTS; Diplo; Mason Ramsey; Nas	"Old Town Road" "Rodeo"
Demi Lovato	"Anyone"
DJ Khaled; Kirk Franklin; John Legend; Meek Mill; Roddy Ricch; YG	Tribute to Nipsey Hussle "Letter to Nipsey" "Higher"
Rosalía	"Juro Qué" "Malamente"
Alicia Keys; Brittany Howard	"Underdog"
H.E.R.	"Sometimes"
Bonnie Raitt	Tribute to John Prine "Angel from Montgomery"
Gary Clark Jr. The Roots	"This Land"
Trombone Shorty; Orleans Avenue; Preservation Hall Jazz Band	Tribute to Dr. John
Ben Platt; Cyndi Lauper; John Legend; Joshua David Bell; Debbie Allen; Misty Copeland; Camila Cabello; Gary Clark Jr. Lang Lang; The War and Treaty; Lee Curreri; Common	Tribute to music education and Kenneth Ehrlich "I Sing the Body Electric"

== Presenters ==
Premiere ceremony

- Imogen Heap – hosted the Grammy Premiere Ceremony, presented Visual Media, World Music, American Roots, Pop and Producer categories
- Kimie Miner – presented Packaging, Notes, Historical, Engineering, Remixer, Surround Sound and Music Video/Film categories
- Esperanza Spalding – presented New Age, American Roots, Reggae, Children's, Spoken Word, Dance and Contemporary Instrumental categories
- Luis Fonsi – presented Composing, Arranging, Jazz and Country categories
- PJ Morton – presented Gospel, Latin and Rap categories
- Natalia Joachim – presented Classical categories
- Jimmy Jam – presented Musical Theatre, Rock, Alternative and R&B categories

Main ceremony

- Billy Porter – introduced the Jonas Brothers
- Keith Urban & Cynthia Erivo – presented Best Pop Solo Performance
- Trevor Noah – introduced Tyler, the Creator
- Shania Twain & Bebe Rexha – presented Best Country Duo/Group Performance
- Jim Gaffigan – introduced Camila Cabello
- Brandi Carlile & Tanya Tucker – presented Best Comedy Album
- Ben Platt – introduced Ariana Grande
- Common – introduced Aerosmith & Run-DMC
- Issa Rae – presented Best Rap Album
- Ellen DeGeneres – introduced Lil Nas X
- Greta Gerwig – introduced Demi Lovato
- Ava DuVernay – introduced the Tribute to Nipsey Hussle
- Smokey Robinson & Little Big Town – presented Song of the Year
- Ozzy & Sharon Osbourne – presented Best Rap/Sung Performance & introduced H.E.R.
- Alicia Keys & Dua Lipa – presented Best New Artist
- John Legend – introduced the Tribute to Kenneth Ehrlich
- LL Cool J – presented Album of the Year
- Alicia Keys – presented Record of the Year

Notes

- Stevie Wonder was announced as a presenter, but did not appear at the ceremony.

== Winners and nominees ==
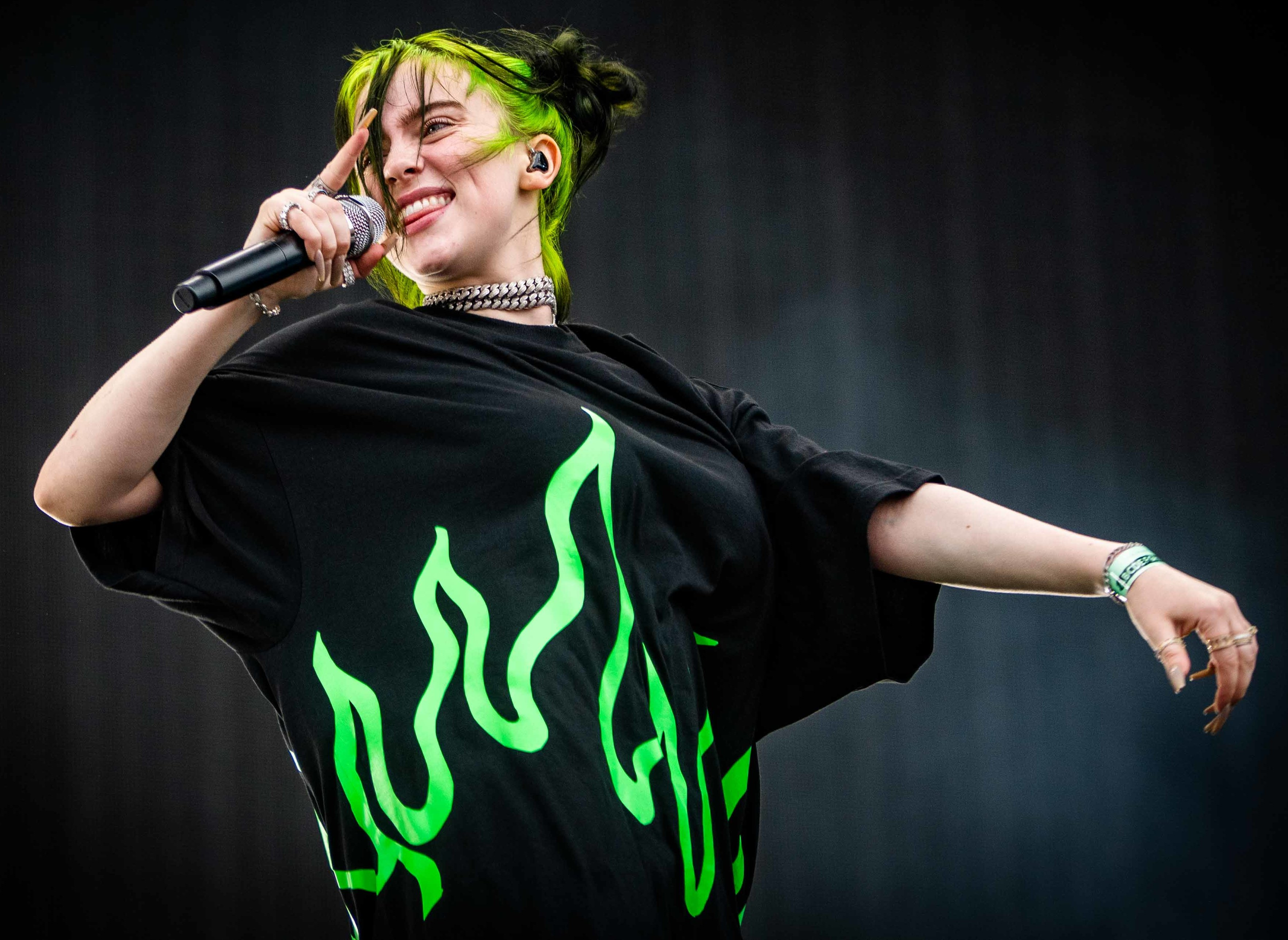
Billie Eilish won all four major general field awards in the same year, becoming the second artist to achieve the feat and the first since 1981.

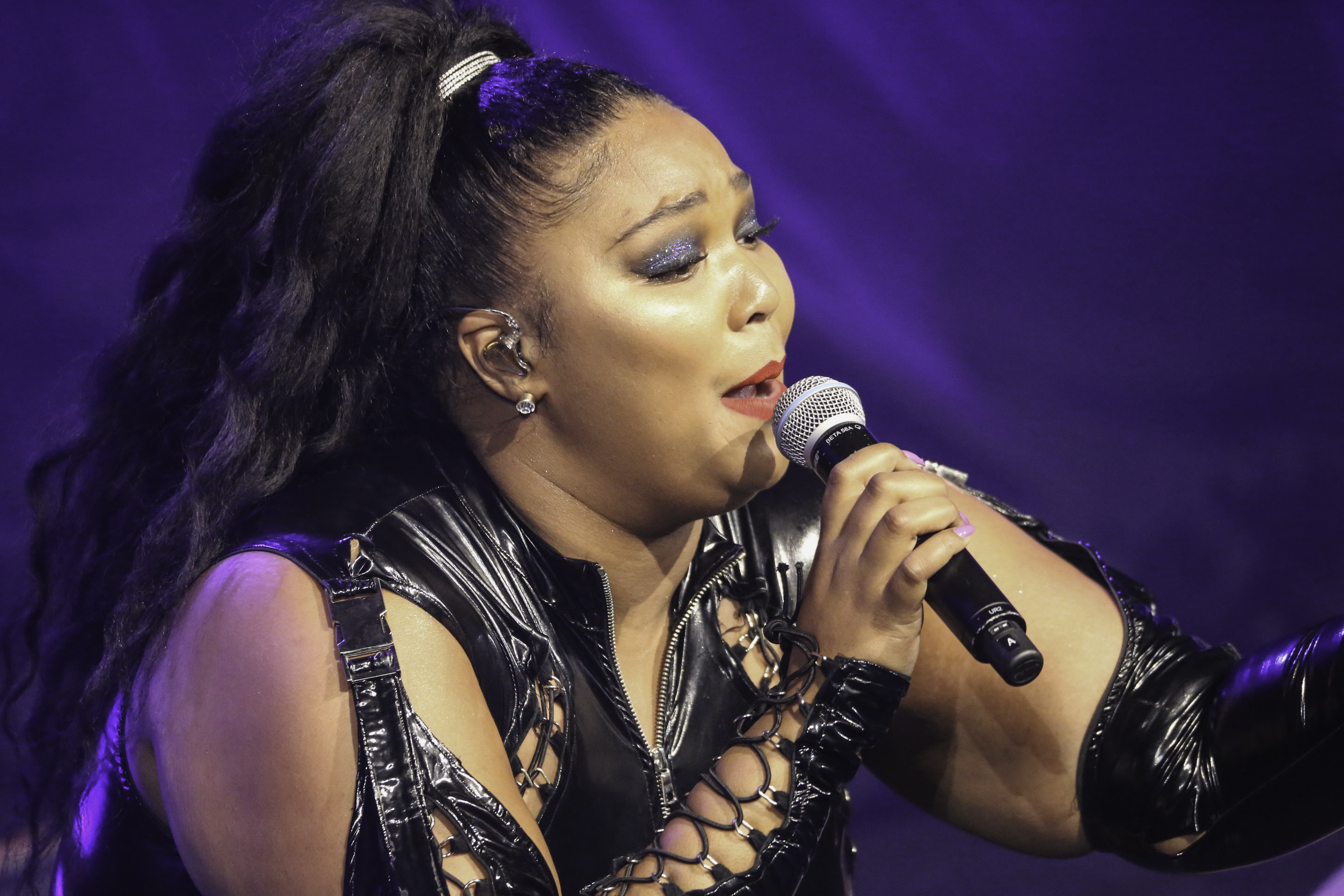
Lizzo received the most nominations, with eight in total. She was also nominated in all four major general field awards.

The nominees and winners (denoted in bold) for the 62nd annual Grammy Awards were as follows:

=== General field ===
Record of the Year

- **"Bad Guy" – Billie Eilish**
  - **Finneas O'Connell, producer; Rob Kinelski & Finneas O'Connell, engineers/mixers; John Greenham, mastering engineer**
- "Hey, Ma" – Bon Iver
  - Brad Cook, Chris Messina & Justin Vernon, producers; Zach Hansen & Chris Messina, engineers/mixers; Greg Calbi, mastering engineer
- "7 Rings" – Ariana Grande
  - Charles Anderson, Tommy Brown, Michael Foster & Victoria Monét, producers; Serban Ghenea, John Hanes, Billy Hickey & Brendan Morawski, engineers/mixers; Randy Merrill, mastering engineer
- "Hard Place" – H.E.R.
  - Rodney "Darkchild" Jerkins, producer; Joseph Hurtado, Jaycen Joshua, Derek Keota & Miki Tsutsumi, engineers/mixers; Colin Leonard, mastering engineer
- "Talk" – Khalid
  - Disclosure & Denis Kosiak, producers; Ingmar Carlson, Jon Castelli, Josh Deguzman, John Kercy, Denis Kosiak, Guy Lawrence & Michael Romero, engineers/mixers; Dale Becker, mastering engineer
- "Old Town Road" – Lil Nas X featuring Billy Ray Cyrus
  - Andrew "VoxGod" Bolooki, Jocelyn "Jozzy" Donald & YoungKio, producers; Andrew "VoxGod" Bolooki & Cinco, engineers/mixers; Eric Lagg, mastering engineer
- "Truth Hurts" – Lizzo
  - Ricky Reed & Tele, producers; Chris Galland, Manny Marroquin & Ethan Shumaker, engineers/mixers; Chris Gehringer, mastering engineer
- "Sunflower" – Post Malone & Swae Lee
  - Louis Bell & Carter Lang, producers; Louis Bell & Manny Marroquin, engineers/mixers; Mike Bozzi, mastering engineer

Album of the Year

- **When We All Fall Asleep, Where Do We Go? – Billie Eilish**
  - **Finneas O'Connell, producer; Rob Kinelski & Finneas O'Connell, engineers/mixers; Billie Eilish & Finneas O'Connell, songwriters; John Greenham, mastering engineer**
- I, I – Bon Iver
  - Brad Cook, Chris Messina & Justin Vernon, producers; Zach Hansen & Chris Messina, engineers/mixers; BJ Burton, Brad Cook & Justin Vernon, songwriters; Greg Calbi, mastering engineer
- Norman Fucking Rockwell! – Lana Del Rey
  - Jack Antonoff & Lana Del Rey, producers; Jack Antonoff & Laura Sisk, engineers/mixers; Jack Antonoff & Lana Del Rey, songwriters; Chris Gehringer, mastering engineer
- Thank U, Next – Ariana Grande
  - Tommy Brown, Ilya, Max Martin & Victoria Monét, producers; Serban Ghenea, Sam Holland & Brendan Morawski, engineers/mixers; Tommy Brown, Ariana Grande, Savan Kotecha, Max Martin, Victoria Monét, Tayla Parx & Ilya Salmanzadeh, songwriters; Randy Merrill, mastering engineer
- I Used to Know Her – H.E.R.
  - David "Swagg R'Celious" Harris, H.E.R., Walter Jones & Jeff Robinson, producers; Miki Tsutsumi, engineer/mixer; Sam Ashworth, Jeff "Gitty" Gitelman, David "Swagg R'Celious" Harris & H.E.R., songwriters; Dave Kutch, mastering engineer
- 7 – Lil Nas X
  - Montero Lamar Hill, songwriter; Eric Lagg, mastering engineer
- Cuz I Love You (Deluxe) – Lizzo
  - Ricky Reed, producer; Manny Marroquin & Ethan Shumaker, engineers/mixers; Eric Frederic & Melissa Jefferson, songwriters; Chris Gehringer, mastering engineer
- Father of the Bride – Vampire Weekend
  - Ezra Koenig & Ariel Rechtshaid, producers; John DeBold, Chris Kasych, Takemasa Kosaka, Ariel Rechtshaid & Hiroya Takayama, engineers/mixers; Ezra Koenig, songwriter; Emily Lazar, mastering engineer

Song of the Year

- **"Bad Guy"**
  - **Billie Eilish O'Connell & Finneas O'Connell, songwriters (Billie Eilish)**
- "Always Remember Us This Way"
  - Natalie Hemby, Lady Gaga, Hillary Lindsey & Lori McKenna, songwriters (Lady Gaga)
- "Bring My Flowers Now"
  - Brandi Carlile, Phil Hanseroth, Tim Hanseroth & Tanya Tucker, songwriters (Tanya Tucker)
- "Hard Place"
  - Ruby Amanfu, Sam Ashworth, D. Arcelious Harris, H.E.R. & Rodney Jerkins, songwriters (H.E.R.)
- "Lover"
  - Taylor Swift, songwriter (Taylor Swift)
- "Norman Fucking Rockwell"
  - Jack Antonoff & Lana Del Rey, songwriters (Lana Del Rey)
- "Someone You Loved"
  - Tom Barnes, Lewis Capaldi, Pete Kelleher, Benjamin Kohn & Sam Roman, songwriters (Lewis Capaldi)
- "Truth Hurts"
  - Steven Cheung, Eric Frederic, Melissa Jefferson & Jesse Saint John, songwriters (Lizzo)

Best New Artist

- **Billie Eilish**
- Black Pumas
- Lil Nas X
- Lizzo
- Maggie Rogers
- Rosalía
- Tank and the Bangas
- Yola

=== Pop ===
Best Pop Solo Performance

- **"Truth Hurts" – Lizzo**
- "Spirit" – Beyoncé
- "Bad Guy" – Billie Eilish
- "7 Rings" – Ariana Grande
- "You Need to Calm Down" – Taylor Swift

Best Pop Duo/Group Performance

- **"Old Town Road" – Lil Nas X featuring Billy Ray Cyrus**
- "Boyfriend" – Ariana Grande and Social House
- "Sucker" – Jonas Brothers
- "Sunflower" – Post Malone & Swae Lee
- "Señorita" – Shawn Mendes & Camila Cabello

Best Traditional Pop Vocal Album

- **Look Now – Elvis Costello & The Imposters**
- Sì – Andrea Bocelli
- Love (Deluxe Edition) – Michael Bublé
- A Legendary Christmas – John Legend
- Walls – Barbra Streisand

Best Pop Vocal Album

- **When We All Fall Asleep, Where Do We Go? – Billie Eilish**
- The Lion King: The Gift – Beyoncé
- Thank U, Next – Ariana Grande
- No.6 Collaborations Project – Ed Sheeran
- Lover – Taylor Swift

=== Dance/electronic music ===
Best Dance Recording

- **"Got to Keep On" – the Chemical Brothers**
  - **The Chemical Brothers, producers; Steve Dub Jones & Tom Rowlands, mixers**
- "Linked" – Bonobo
  - Simon Green, producer; Bonobo, mixer
- "Piece of Your Heart" – Meduza featuring Goodboys
  - Simone Giani, Luca De Gregorio & Mattia Vitale, producers; Simone Giani, Luca De Gregorio & Mattia Vitale, mixers
- "Underwater" – Rüfüs Du Sol
  - Jason Evigan & Rüfüs Du Sol, producers; Cassian Stewart-Kasimba, mixer
- "Midnight Hour" – Skrillex & Boys Noize featuring Ty Dolla $ign
  - Boys Noize & Skrillex, producers; Skrillex, mixer

Best Dance/Electronic Album

- **No Geography – The Chemical Brothers**
- LP5 – Apparat
- Hi This Is Flume (Mixtape) – Flume
- Solace – Rüfüs Du Sol
- Weather – Tycho

=== Contemporary instrumental music ===
Best Contemporary Instrumental Album

- **Mettavolution – Rodrigo y Gabriela**
- Ancestral Recall – Christian Scott aTunde Adjuah
- Star People Nation – Theo Croker
- Beat Music! Beat Music! Beat Music! – Mark Guiliana
- Elevate – Lettuce

=== Rock ===
Best Rock Performance

- **"This Land" – Gary Clark Jr.**
- "Pretty Waste" – Bones UK
- "History Repeats" – Brittany Howard
- "Woman" – Karen O & Danger Mouse
- "Too Bad" – Rival Sons

Best Metal Performance

- **"7empest" – Tool**
- "Astorolus – The Great Octopus" – Candlemass featuring Tony Iommi
- "Humanicide" – Death Angel
- "Bow Down" – I Prevail
- "Unleashed" – Killswitch Engage

Best Rock Song

- **"This Land"**
  - **Gary Clark Jr., songwriter (Gary Clark Jr.)**
- "Fear Inoculum"
  - Danny Carey, Justin Chancellor, Adam Jones & Maynard James Keenan, songwriters (Tool)
- "Give Yourself a Try"
  - George Daniel, Adam Hann, Matthew Healy & Ross MacDonald, songwriters (The 1975)
- "Harmony Hall"
  - Ezra Koenig, songwriter (Vampire Weekend)
- "History Repeats"
  - Brittany Howard, songwriter (Brittany Howard)

Best Rock Album

- **Social Cues – Cage the Elephant**
- Amo – Bring Me the Horizon
- In the End – The Cranberries
- Trauma – I Prevail
- Feral Roots – Rival Sons

=== Alternative ===
Best Alternative Music Album

- **Father of the Bride – Vampire Weekend**
- U.F.O.F. – Big Thief
- Assume Form – James Blake
- I, I – Bon Iver
- Anima – Thom Yorke

=== R&B ===
Best R&B Performance

- **"Come Home" – Anderson .Paak featuring André 3000**
- "Love Again" – Daniel Caesar & Brandy
- "Could've Been" – H.E.R. featuring Bryson Tiller
- "Exactly How I Feel" – Lizzo featuring Gucci Mane
- "Roll Some Mo" – Lucky Daye

Best Traditional R&B Performance

- **"Jerome" – Lizzo**
- "Time Today" – BJ the Chicago Kid
- "Steady Love" – India.Arie
- "Real Games" – Lucky Daye
- "Built for Love" – PJ Morton featuring Jazmine Sullivan

Best R&B Song

- **"Say So"**
  - **PJ Morton, songwriter (PJ Morton featuring JoJo)**
- "Could've Been"
  - Dernst Emile II, David "Swagg R’Celious" Harris, H.E.R. & Hue "Soundzfire" Strother, songwriters (H.E.R. featuring Bryson Tiller)
- "Look at Me Now"
  - Emily King & Jeremy Most, songwriters (Emily King)
- "No Guidance"
  - Chris Brown, Tyler James Bryant, Nija Charles, Aubrey Graham, Anderson Hernandez, Michee Patrick Lebrun, Joshua Lewis, Noah Shebib & Teddy Walton, songwriters (Chris Brown featuring Drake)
- "Roll Some Mo"
  - David Brown, Dernst Emile II & Peter Lee Johnson, songwriters (Lucky Daye)

Best Urban Contemporary Album

- **Cuz I Love You (Deluxe) – Lizzo**
- Apollo XXI – Steve Lacy
- Overload – Georgia Anne Muldrow
- Saturn – NAO
- Being Human in Public – Jessie Reyez

Best R&B Album

- **Ventura – Anderson .Paak**
- 1123 – BJ the Chicago Kid
- Painted – Lucky Daye
- Ella Mai – Ella Mai
- Paul – PJ Morton

=== Rap ===
Best Rap Performance

- **"Racks in the Middle" – Nipsey Hussle featuring Roddy Ricch & Hit-Boy**
- "Middle Child" – J. Cole
- "Suge" – DaBaby
- "Down Bad" – Dreamville featuring JID, Bas, J. Cole, EarthGang & Young Nudy
- "Clout" – Offset featuring Cardi B

Best Rap/Sung Performance

- **"Higher" – DJ Khaled featuring Nipsey Hussle & John Legend**
- "Drip Too Hard" – Lil Baby & Gunna
- "Panini" – Lil Nas X
- "Ballin" – Mustard featuring Roddy Ricch
- "The London" – Young Thug featuring J. Cole & Travis Scott

Best Rap Song

- **"A Lot"**
  - **Jermaine Cole, Dacoury Natche, 21 Savage & Anthony White, songwriters (21 Savage featuring J. Cole)**
- "Bad Idea"
  - Chancelor Bennett, Cordae Dunston, Uforo Ebong & Daniel Hackett, songwriters (YBN Cordae featuring Chance the Rapper)
- "Gold Roses"
  - Noel Cadastre, Aubrey Graham, Anderson Hernandez, Khristopher Riddick-Tynes, William Leonard Roberts II, Joshua Quinton Scruggs, Leon Thomas III & Ozan Yildirim, songwriters (Rick Ross featuring Drake)
- "Racks in the Middle"
  - Ermias Asghedom, Dustin James Corbett, Greg Allen Davis, Chauncey Hollis Jr. & Rodrick Moore, songwriters (Nipsey Hussle featuring Roddy Ricch & Hit-Boy)
- "Suge"
  - DaBaby, Jetsonmade & Pooh Beatz, songwriters (DaBaby)

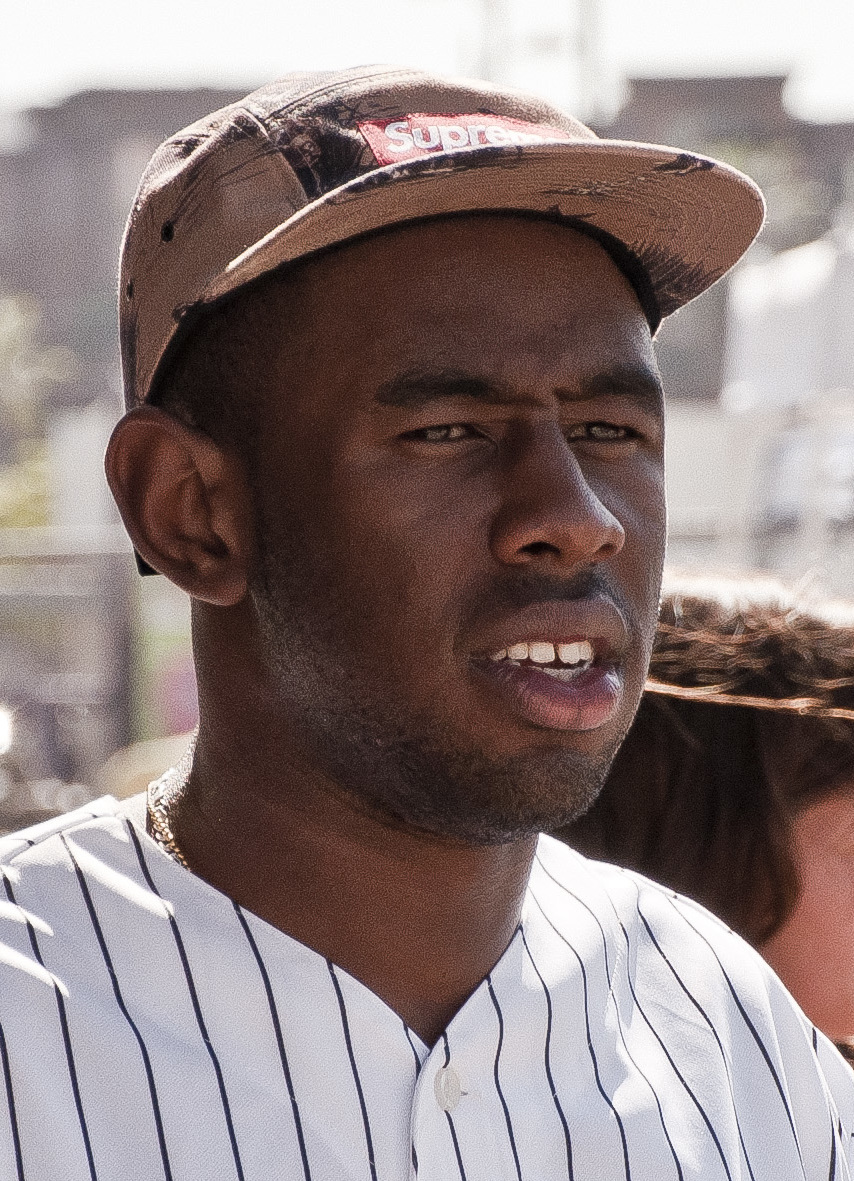
Tyler, the Creator expressed disappointment that his 2019 album Igor was categorized as rap instead of pop, describing the decision as "a backhanded compliment."

Best Rap Album

- **IGOR – Tyler, the Creator**
- Revenge of the Dreamers III – Dreamville
- Championships – Meek Mill
- I Am > I Was – 21 Savage
- The Lost Boy – YBN Cordae

=== Country ===
Best Country Solo Performance

- **"Ride Me Back Home" – Willie Nelson**
- "All Your'n" – Tyler Childers
- "Girl Goin' Nowhere" – Ashley McBryde
- "God's Country" – Blake Shelton
- "Bring My Flowers Now" – Tanya Tucker

Best Country Duo/Group Performance

- **"Speechless" – Dan + Shay**
- "Brand New Man" – Brooks & Dunn with Luke Combs
- "I Don't Remember Me (Before You)" – Brothers Osborne
- "The Daughters" – Little Big Town
- "Common" – Maren Morris featuring Brandi Carlile

Best Country Song

- **"Bring My Flowers Now"**
  - **Brandi Carlile, Phil Hanseroth, Tim Hanseroth & Tanya Tucker, songwriters (Tanya Tucker)**
- "Girl Goin' Nowhere"
  - Jeremy Bussey & Ashley McBryde, songwriters (Ashley McBryde)
- "It All Comes Out in the Wash"
  - Miranda Lambert, Hillary Lindsey, Lori McKenna & Liz Rose, songwriters (Miranda Lambert)
- "Some of It"
  - Eric Church, Clint Daniels, Jeff Hyde & Bobby Pinson, songwriters (Eric Church)
- "Speechless"
  - Shay Mooney, Jordan Reynolds, Dan Smyers & Laura Veltz, songwriters (Dan + Shay)

Best Country Album

- **While I'm Livin' – Tanya Tucker**
- Desperate Man – Eric Church
- Stronger Than the Truth – Reba McEntire
- Interstate Gospel – Pistol Annies
- Center Point Road – Thomas Rhett

=== New age ===
Best New Age Album

- **Wings – Peter Kater**
- Fairy Dreams – David Arkenstone
- Homage to Kindness – David Darling
- Verve – Sebastian Plano
- Deva – Deva Premal

=== Jazz ===
Best Improvised Jazz Solo

- **"Sozinho" – Randy Brecker, soloist**
- "Elsewhere" – Melissa Aldana, soloist
- "Tomorrow Is the Question" – Julian Lage, soloist
- "The Windup" – Branford Marsalis, soloist
- "Sightseeing" – Christian McBride, soloist

Best Jazz Vocal Album

- **12 Little Spells – Esperanza Spalding**
- Thirsty Ghost – Sara Gazarek
- Love & Liberation – Jazzmeia Horn
- Alone Together – Catherine Russell
- ScreenPlay – The Tierney Sutton Band

Best Jazz Instrumental Album

- **Finding Gabriel – Brad Mehldau**
- In the Key of the Universe – Joey DeFrancesco
- The Secret Between the Shadow and the Soul – Branford Marsalis Quartet
- Christian McBride's New Jawn – Christian McBride
- Come What May – Joshua Redman Quartet

Best Large Jazz Ensemble Album

- **The Omni-American Book Club – Brian Lynch Big Band**
- Triple Helix – Anat Cohen Tentet
- Dancer in Nowhere – Miho Hazama and m_unit
- Hiding Out – Mike Holober & The Gotham Jazz Orchestra
- One Day Wonder – Terraza Big Band

Best Latin Jazz Album

- **Antidote – Chick Corea & The Spanish Heart Band**
- Sorte!: Music By John Finbury – Thalma de Freitas with Vítor Gonçalves, John Patitucci, Chico Pinheiro, Rogerio Boccato & Duduka Da Fonseca
- Una Noche con Rubén Blades – Jazz at Lincoln Center Orchestra with Wynton Marsalis & Rubén Blades
- Carib – David Sánchez
- Sonero: The Music of Ismael Rivera – Miguel Zenón

=== Gospel/contemporary Christian music ===
Best Gospel Performance/Song

- **"Love Theory"**
  - **Kirk Franklin, songwriter (Kirk Franklin)**
- "Talkin' 'Bout Jesus"
  - Bryan Fowler, Gloria Gaynor & Chris Stevens, songwriters (Gloria Gaynor featuring Yolanda Adams)
- "See the Light"
  - Travis Greene & Jekalyn Carr, songwriters (Travis Greene featuring Jekalyn Carr)
- "Speak the Name"
  - Koryn Hawthorne & Natalie Grant, songwriters (Koryn Hawthorne featuring Natalie Grant)
- "This Is a Move (Live)"
  - Tony Brown, Brandon Lake, Tasha Cobbs Leonard & Nate Moore, songwriters (Tasha Cobbs Leonard)

Best Contemporary Christian Music Performance/Song

- **"God Only Knows"**
  - **Josh Kerr, Jordan Reynolds, Joel Smallbone, Luke Smallbone & Tedd Tjornhom, songwriters (for KING & COUNTRY & Dolly Parton)**
- "Only Jesus"
  - Mark Hall, Bernie Herms & Matthew West, songwriters (Casting Crowns)
- "Haven't Seen It Yet"
  - Danny Gokey, Ethan Hulse & Colby Wedgeworth, songwriters (Danny Gokey)
- "God's Not Done with You (Single Version)"
  - Tauren Wells, songwriter (Tauren Wells)
- "Rescue Story"
  - Ethan Hulse, Andrew Ripp, Jonathan Smith & Zach Williams, songwriters (Zach Williams)

Best Gospel Album

- **Long Live Love – Kirk Franklin**
- Goshen Donald Lawrence Presents the Tri – City Singers
- Tunnel Vision – Gene Moore
- Settle Here – William Murphy
- Something's Happening! A Christmas Album – CeCe Winans

Best Contemporary Christian Music Album

- **Burn the Ships – for KING & COUNTRY**
- I Know a Ghost – Crowder
- Haven't Seen It Yet – Danny Gokey
- The Elements – TobyMac
- Holy Roar – Chris Tomlin

Best Roots Gospel Album

- **Testimony – Gloria Gaynor**
- Deeper Roots: Where the Bluegrass Grows – Steven Curtis Chapman
- Deeper Oceans – Joseph Habedank
- His Name Is Jesus – Tim Menzies
- Gonna Sing, Gonna Shout – Various artists; Jerry Salley, producer

=== Latin ===
Best Latin Pop Album

- **El Disco – Alejandro Sanz**
- Vida – Luis Fonsi
- 11:11 – Maluma
- Montaner – Ricardo Montaner
- Fantasía – Sebastian Yatra

Best Latin Rock, Urban or Alternative Album

- **El Mal Querer – Rosalía**
- X 100pre – Bad Bunny
- Oasis – J Balvin & Bad Bunny
- Indestructible – Flor de Toloache
- Almadura – iLe

Best Regional Mexican Music Album (Including Tejano)

- **De Ayer Para siempre – Mariachi los Camperos**
- Caminado – Joss Favela
- Percepcion – Intocable
- Poco a Poco – La Energía Norteña
- 20 aniversario – Mariachi Divas de Cindy Shea

Best Tropical Latin Album

- **Opus – Marc Anthony (TIE)**
- **A Journey Through Cuban Music – Aymée Nuviola (TIE)**
- Tiempo al Tiempo – Luis Enrique + C4 Trio
- Candela – Vicente García
- Literal – Juan Luis Guerra 4.40

=== American roots ===
Best American Roots Performance

- **"Saint Honesty" – Sara Bareilles**
- "Father Mountain" – Calexico and Iron & Wine
- "I'm on My Way" – Rhiannon Giddens with Francesco Turrisi
- "Call My Name" – I'm with Her
- "Faraway Look" – Yola

Best American Roots Song

- **"Call My Name"**
  - **Sarah Jarosz, Aoife O'Donovan & Sara Watkins, songwriters (I'm with Her)**
- "Black Myself"
  - Amythyst Kiah, songwriter (Our Native Daughters)
- "Crossing to Jerusalem"
  - Rosanne Cash & John Leventhal, songwriters (Rosanne Cash)
- "Faraway Look"
  - Dan Auerbach, Yola Carter & Pat McLaughlin, songwriters (Yola)
- "I Don't Wanna Ride the Rails No More"
  - Vince Gill, songwriter (Vince Gill)

Best Americana Album

- **Oklahoma – Keb' Mo'**
- Years to Burn – Calexico and Iron & Wine
- Who Are You Now – Madison Cunningham
- Tales of America – J.S. Ondara
- Walk Through Fire – Yola

Best Bluegrass Album

- **Tall Fiddler – Michael Cleveland**
- Live in Prague, Czech Republic – Doyle Lawson & Quicksilver
- Toil, Tears & Trouble – The Po' Ramblin' Boys
- Royal Traveller – Missy Raines
- If You Can't Stand the Heat – Frank Solivan & Dirty Kitchen

Best Traditional Blues Album

- **Tall, Dark, and Handsome – Delbert McClinton & Self-Made Men + Dana**
- Kingfish – Christone "Kingfish" Ingram
- Sitting on Top of the Blues – Bobby Rush
- Baby, Please Come Home – Jimmie Vaughan
- Spectacular Class – Jontavious Willis

Best Contemporary Blues Album

- **This Land – Gary Clark Jr.**
- Venom & Faith – Larkin Poe
- Brighter Days – Robert Randolph and the Family Band
- Somebody Save Me – Sugaray Rayford
- Keep On – Southern Avenue

Best Folk Album

- **Patty Griffin – Patty Griffin**
- My Finest Work Yet – Andrew Bird
- Rearrange My Heart – Che Apalache
- Evening Machines – Gregory Alan Isakov
- Front Porch – Joy Williams

Best Regional Roots Music Album

- **Good Time – Ranky Tanky**
- Kalawai‘anui – Amy Hānaialiʻi
- When It's Cold – Cree Round Dance Songs – Northern Cree
- Recorded Live at the 2019 New Orleans Jazz & Heritage Festival – Rebirth Brass Band
- Hawaiian Lullaby – Various artists; Imua Garza & Kimié Miner, producers

=== Reggae ===
Best Reggae Album

- **Rapture – Koffee**
- As I Am – Julian Marley
- The Final Battle: Sly & Robbie vs. Roots Radics – Sly and Robbie & Roots Radics
- Mass Manipulation – Steel Pulse
- More Work to Be Done – Third World

=== World music ===
Best World Music Album

- **Celia – Angélique Kidjo**
- Gece – Altın Gün
- What Heat – Bokanté & Metropole Orkest conducted by Jules Buckley
- African Giant – Burna Boy
- Fanm d'Ayiti – Nathalie Joachim with Spektral Quartet

=== Children's ===
Best Children's Album

- **Ageless: Songs for the Child Archetype – Jon Samson**
- Flying High! – Caspar Babypants
- I Love Rainy Days – Daniel Tashian
- The Love – Alphabet Rockers
- Winterland – The Okee Dokee Brothers

=== Spoken word ===
Best Spoken Word Album (Includes Poetry, Audio Books & Storytelling)

- **Becoming – Michelle Obama**
- Beastie Boys Book – Various artists; Michael Diamond, Adam Horovitz, Scott Sherratt & Dan Zitt, producers
- I.V. Catatonia: 20 Years as a Two-Time Cancer Survivor – Eric Alexandrakis
- Mr. Know-It-All – John Waters
- Sekou Andrews & The String Theory – Sekou Andrews & The String Theory

=== Comedy ===
Best Comedy Album

- **Sticks & Stones – Dave Chappelle**
- Quality Time – Jim Gaffigan
- Relatable – Ellen DeGeneres
- Right Now – Aziz Ansari
- Son of Patricia – Trevor Noah

=== Musical theater ===
Best Musical Theater Album

- **Hadestown – Reeve Carney, André De Shields, Amber Gray, Eva Noblezada & Patrick Page, principal soloists; Mara Isaacs, David Lai, Anaïs Mitchell & Todd Sickafoose, producers (Anaïs Mitchell, composer & lyricist) (Original Broadway Cast)**
- Ain't Too Proud: The Life and Times of The Temptations – Saint Aubyn, Derrick Baskin, James Harkness, Jawan M. Jackson, Jeremy Pope & Ephraim Sykes, principal soloists; Scott M. Riesett, producer (Original Broadway Cast)
- Moulin Rouge! The Musical – Danny Burstein, Tam Mutu, Sahr Ngaujah, Karen Olivo & Aaron Tveit, principal soloists; Justin Levine, Baz Luhrmann, Matt Stine & Alex Timbers, producers (Original Broadway Cast)
- The Music of Harry Potter and the Cursed Child – In Four Contemporary Suites – Imogen Heap, producer; Imogen Heap, composer (Imogen Heap)
- Oklahoma! – Damon Daunno, Rebecca Naomi Jones, Ali Stroker, Mary Testa & Patrick Vaill, principal soloists; Daniel Kluger & Dean Sharenow, producers (Richard Rodgers, composer; Oscar Hammerstein II, lyricist) (2019 Broadway Cast)

=== Music for visual media ===
Best Compilation Soundtrack for Visual Media

- **A Star Is Born – Lady Gaga & Bradley Cooper**
  - **Paul "DJWS" Blair, Bradley Cooper, Lady Gaga, Nick Monson, Lukas Nelson, Mark Nilan Jr. & Benjamin Rice, compilation producers; Julianne Jordan & Julia Michels, music supervisors**
- The Lion King: The Songs – Various Artists
  - Jon Favreau & Hans Zimmer, compilation producers
- Quentin Tarantino's Once Upon a Time in Hollywood – Various Artists
  - Quentin Tarantino, compilation producer; Mary Ramos, music supervisor
- Rocketman – Taron Egerton
  - Giles Martin, compilation producer
- Spider-Man: Into the Spider-Verse – Various Artists
  - Spring Aspers & Dana Sano, compilation producers; Kier Lehman, music supervisor

Best Score Soundtrack for Visual Media

- **Chernobyl – Hildur Guðnadóttir, composer**
- Avengers: Endgame – Alan Silvestri, composer
- Game of Thrones: Season 8 – Ramin Djawadi, composer
- The Lion King – Hans Zimmer, composer
- Mary Poppins Returns – Marc Shaiman, composer

Best Song Written for Visual Media

- **"I'll Never Love Again (Film Version)" (from A Star Is Born)**
  - **Natalie Hemby, Lady Gaga, Hillary Lindsey & Aaron Raitiere, songwriters (Lady Gaga & Bradley Cooper)**
- "The Ballad of the Lonesome Cowboy" (from Toy Story 4)
  - Randy Newman, songwriter (Chris Stapleton)
- "Girl in the Movies" (from Dumplin')
  - Dolly Parton & Linda Perry, songwriters (Dolly Parton)
- "Spirit" (from The Lion King)
  - Beyoncé Knowles-Carter, Timothy McKenzie & Ilya Salmanzadeh, songwriter (Beyoncé)
- "Suspirium" (from Suspiria)
  - Thom Yorke, songwriter (Thom Yorke)

=== Composing ===
Best Instrumental Composition

- **Star Wars: "Galaxy's Edge (Symphonic Suite)"**
  - **John Williams, composer (John Williams)**
- "Begin Again"
  - Fred Hersch, composer (Fred Hersch & The WDR Big Band Conducted by Vince Mendoza)
- "Crucible for Crisis"
  - Brian Lynch, composer (Brian Lynch Big Band)
- "Love, a Beautiful Force"
  - Vince Mendoza, composer (Vince Mendoza, Terell Stafford, Dick Oatts & Temple University Studio Orchestra)
- "Walkin' Funny"
  - Christian McBride, composer (Christian McBride)

=== Arranging ===
Best Arrangement, Instrumental or A Cappella

- **"Moon River"**
  - **Jacob Collier, arranger (Jacob Collier)**
- "Blue Skies"
  - Kris Bowers, arranger (Kris Bowers)
- "Hedwig's Theme"
  - John Williams, arranger (Anne-Sophie Mutter & John Williams)
- "La Novena"
  - Emilio Solla, arranger (Emilio Solla Tango Jazz Orchestra)
- "Love, a Beautiful Force"
  - Vince Mendoza, arranger (Vince Mendoza, Terell Stafford, Dick Oatts & Temple University Studio Orchestra)

Best Arrangement, Instruments and Vocals

- **"All Night Long"**
  - **Jacob Collier, arranger (Jacob Collier featuring Jules Buckley, Take 6 & Metropole Orkest)**
- "Jolene"
  - Geoff Keezer, arranger (Sara Gazarek)
- "Marry Me a Little"
  - Cyrille Aimee & Diego Figueiredo, arrangers (Cyrille Aimée)
- "Over the Rainbow"
  - Vince Mendoza, arranger (Trisha Yearwood)
- "12 Little Spells (Thoracic Spine)"
  - Esperanza Spalding, arranger (Esperanza Spalding)

=== Package ===
Best Recording Package

- **Chris Cornell**
  - **Barry Ament, Jeff Ament, Jeff Fura & Joe Spix, art directors (Chris Cornell)**
- Anónimas & resilientes
  - Luisa María Arango, Carlos Dussan, Manuel García-Orozco & Juliana Jaramillo-Buenaventura, art directors (Voces del Bullerengue)
- Hold That Tiger
  - Andrew Wong & Fongming Yang, art directors (The Muddy Basin Ramblers)
- I, I
  - Aaron Anderson & Eric Timothy Carlson, art directors (Bon Iver)
- Intellexual
  - Irwan Awalludin, art director (Intellexual)

Best Boxed or Special Limited Edition Package

- **Woodstock – Back to the Garden: The Definitive 50th Anniversary Archive**
  - **Masaki Koike, art director (Various artists)**
- Anima
  - Stanley Donwood & Tchocky, art directors (Thom Yorke)
- Gold in Brass Age
  - Amanda Chiu, Mark Farrow & David Gray, art directors (David Gray)
- 1963: New Directions
  - Josh Cheuse, art director (John Coltrane)
- The Radio Recordings 1939–1945
  - Marek Polewski, art director (Wilhelm Furtwängler & Berliner Philharmoniker)

=== Notes ===
Best Album Notes

- **Stax '68: A Memphis Story**
  - **Steve Greenberg, album notes writer (Various artists)**
- The Complete Cuban Jam Sessions
  - Judy Cantor-Navas, album notes writer (Various artists)
- The Gospel According to Malaco
  - Robert Marovich, album notes writer (Various artists)
- Pedal Steel + Four Corners
  - Brendan Greaves, album notes writer (Terry Allen and the Panhandle Mystery Band)
- Pete Seeger: The Smithsonian Folkways Collection
  - Jeff Place, album notes writer (Pete Seeger)

=== Historical ===
Best Historical Album

- **Pete Seeger: The Smithsonian Folkways Collection**
  - **Jeff Place & Robert Santelli, compilation producers; Pete Reiniger, mastering engineer (Pete Seeger)**
- The Girl from Chickasaw County – The Complete Capitol Masters
  - Andrew Batt & Kris Maher, compilation producers; Simon Gibson, mastering engineer (Bobbie Gentry)
- The Great Comeback: Horowitz at Carnegie Hall
  - Robert Russ, compilation producer; Andreas K. Meyer & Jennifer Nulsen, mastering engineers (Vladimir Horowitz)
- Kankyō Ongaku: Japanese Ambient, Environmental & New Age Music 1980–1990
  - Spencer Doran, Yosuke Kitazawa, Douglas Mcgowan & Matt Sullivan, compilation producers; John Baldwin, mastering engineer (Various artists)
- Woodstock: Back to the Garden – The Definitive 50th Anniversary Archive
  - Brian Kehew, Steve Woolard & Andy Zax, compilation producers; Dave Schultz, mastering engineer (Various artists)

=== Production, non-classical ===
Best Engineered Album, Non-Classical

- **When We All Fall Asleep, Where Do We Go?**
  - **Rob Kinelski** **& Finneas O'Connell, engineers; John Greenham, mastering engineer (Billie Eilish)**
- All These Things
  - Tchad Blake, Adam Greenspan & Roderick Shearer, engineers; Bernie Grundman, mastering engineer (Thomas Dybdahl)
- Ella Mai
  - Chris "Shaggy" Ascher, Jaycen Joshua & David Pizzimenti, engineers; Chris Athens, mastering engineer (Ella Mai)
- Run Home Slow
  - Paul Butler & Sam Teskey, engineers; Joe Carra, mastering engineer (The Teskey Brothers)
- Scenery
  - Tom Elmhirst, Ben Kane & Jeremy Most, engineers; Bob Ludwig, mastering engineer (Emily King)

Producer of the Year, Non-Classical

- **Finneas**
  - When We All Fall Asleep, Where Do We Go? (Billie Eilish)
- Jack Antonoff
  - Arizona Baby (Kevin Abstract)
  - Lover (Taylor Swift)
  - Norman F***ing Rockwell! (Lana Del Rey)
  - Red Hearse (Red Hearse)
- Dan Auerbach
  - The Angels in Heaven Done Signed My Name (Leo Bud Welch)
  - "Let's Rock" (The Black Keys)
  - Mockingbird (The Gibson Brothers)
  - Myth of a Man (Night Beats)
  - Southern Gentleman (Dee White)
  - Walk Through Fire (Yola)
- John Hill
  - "Heat of the Summer" (Young The Giant)
  - "Hundred" (Khalid)
  - "No Drug like Me" (Carly Rae Jepsen)
  - "Outta My Head" (Khalid With John Mayer)
  - Social Cues (Cage The Elephant)
  - "Superposition" (Young The Giant)
  - "Too Much" (Carly Rae Jepsen)
  - "Vertigo" (Khalid)
  - "Zero" (from Ralph Breaks the Internet) (Imagine Dragons)
- Ricky Reed
  - Almost Free (Fidlar)
  - "Burning" (Maggie Rogers)
  - "Confidence" (X Ambassadors featuring K.Flay)
  - "Juice" (Lizzo)
  - "Kingdom of One" (Maren Morris)
  - "Power Is Power" (SZA, The Weeknd, & Travis Scott)
  - "Tempo" (Lizzo featuring Missy Elliott)
  - "Truth Hurts" (Lizzo)
  - The Wrong Man (Ross Golan)

Best Remixed Recording

- **"I Rise" (Tracy Young's Pride Intro Radio Remix)**
  - **Tracy Young, remixer (Madonna)**
- "Mother's Daughter" (Wuki Remix)
  - Wuki, remixer (Miley Cyrus)
- "The One" (High Contrast Remix)
  - Lincoln Barrett, remixer (Jorja Smith)
- "Swim" (Ford. Remix)
  - Luc Bradford, remixer (Mild Minds)
- "Work It" (Soulwax Remix)
  - David Gerard C Dewaele & Stephen Antoine C Dewaele, remixers (Marie Davidson)

=== Production, immersive audio ===
Best Immersive Audio Album

- **Lux**
  - **Morten Lindberg, immersive audio engineer; Morten Lindberg, immersive audio mastering engineer; Morten Lindberg, immersive audio producer (Anita Brevik, Trondheimsolistene & Nidarosdomens Jentekor)**
- Chain Tripping
  - Luke Argilla, immersive audio engineer; Jurgen Scharpf, immersive audio mastering engineer; Jona Bechtolt, Claire L. Evans & Rob Kieswetter, immersive audio producers (Yacht)
- Kverndokk: Symphonic Dances
  - Jim Anderson, immersive audio engineer; Robert C. Ludwig, immersive audio mastering engineer; Ulrike Schwarz, immersive audio producer (Ken-David Masur & Stavanger Symphony Orchestra)
- The Orchestral Organ
  - Keith O. Johnson, immersive audio engineer; Keith O. Johnson, immersive audio mastering engineer; Marina A. Ledin & Victor Ledin, immersive audio producers (Jan Kraybill)
- The Savior
  - Bob Clearmountain, immersive audio engineer; Bob Ludwig, immersive audio mastering engineer; Michael Marquart & Dave Way, immersive audio producers (A Bad Think)

=== Production, classical ===
Best Engineered Album, Classical

- **Riley: Sun Rings**
  - **Leslie Ann Jones, engineer; Robert C. Ludwig, mastering engineer (Kronos Quartet)**
- Aequa – Anna Thorvaldsdóttir
  - Daniel Shores, engineer; Daniel Shores, mastering engineer (International Contemporary Ensemble)
- Bruckner: Symphony No. 9
  - Mark Donahue, engineer; Mark Donahue, mastering engineer (Manfred Honeck & Pittsburgh Symphony Orchestra)
- Rachmaninoff – Hermitage Piano Trio
  - Keith O. Johnson & Sean Royce Martin, engineers; Keith O. Johnson, mastering engineer (Hermitage Piano Trio)
- Wolfe: Fire in My Mouth
  - Bob Hanlon & Lawrence Rock, engineers; Ian Good & Lawrence Rock, mastering engineers (Jaap Van Zweden, Francisco J. Núñez, Donald Nally, The Crossing, Young People's Chorus of NY City & New York Philharmonic)

Producer of the Year, Classical

- **Blanton Alspaugh**
  - Artifacts – The Music of Michael McGlynn (Charles Bruffy & Kansas City Chorale)
  - Berlioz: Symphonie fantastique; Fantaisie sur La Tempête de Shakespeare (Andrew Davis & Toronto Symphony Orchestra)
  - Copland: Billy the Kid; Grohg (Leonard Slatkin & Detroit Symphony Orchestra)
  - Duruflé: Complete Choral Works (Robert Simpson & Houston Chamber Choir)
  - Glass: Symphony No. 5 (Julian Wachner, The Choir Of Trinity Wall Street, Trinity Youth Chorus, Downtown Voices & Novus NY)
  - Sander: The Divine Liturgy of St. John Chrysostom (Peter Jermihov & PaTRAM Institute Singers)
  - Smith, K.: Canticle (Craig Hella Johnson & Cincinnati Vocal Arts Ensemble)
  - Visions Take Flight (Mei-Ann Chen & ROCO)
- James Ginsburg
  - Project W – Works by Diverse Women Composers (Mei-Ann Chen & Chicago Sinfonietta)
  - Silenced Voices (Black Oak Ensemble)
  - 20th Century Harpsichord Concertos (Jory Vinikour, Scott Speck & Chicago Philharmonic)
  - Twentieth Century Oboe Sonatas (Alex Klein & Phillip Bush)
  - Winged Creatures & Other Works for Flute, Clarinet, and Orchestra (Anthony McGill, Demarre McGill, Allen Tinkham & Chicago Youth Symphony Orchestra)
- Marina A. Ledin & Victor Ledin
  - Bates: Children of Adam; Vaughan Williams: Dona nobis pacem (Steven Smith, Erin R. Freeman, Richmond Symphony & Chorus)
  - The Orchestral Organ (Jan Kraybill)
  - The Poetry of Places (Nadia Shpachenko)
  - Rachmaninoff – Hermitage Piano Trio (Hermitage Piano Trio)
- Morten Lindberg
  - Himmelborgen (Elisabeth Holte, Kåre Nordstoga & Uranienborg Vokalensemble)
  - Kleiberg: Do You Believe in Heather? (Various artists)
  - Ljos (Fauna Vokalkvintett)
  - LUX (Anita Brevik, Trondheimsolistene & Nidarosdomens Jentekor)
  - Trachea (Tone Bianca Sparre Dahl & Schola Cantorum)
  - Veneliti (Håkon Daniel Nystedt & Oslo Kammerkor)
- Dirk Sobotka
  - Bruckner: Symphony No. 9 (Manfred Honeck & Pittsburgh Symphony Orchestra)

=== Classical ===
Best Orchestral Performance

- **Norman: Sustain**
  - **Gustavo Dudamel, conductor (Los Angeles Philharmonic)**
- Bruckner: Symphony No. 9
  - Manfred Honeck, conductor (Pittsburgh Symphony Orchestra)
- Copland: Billy the Kid; Grohg
  - Leonard Slatkin, conductor (Detroit Symphony Orchestra)
- Transatlantic
  - Louis Langrée, conductor (Cincinnati Symphony Orchestra)
- Weinberg: Symphonies Nos. 2 & 21
  - Mirga Gražinytė-Tyla, conductor (City of Birmingham Symphony Orchestra & Kremerata Baltica)

Best Opera Recording

- **Picker: Fantastic Mr. Fox**
  - **Gil Rose, conductor; John Brancy, Andrew Craig Brown, Gabriel Preisser, Krista River & Edwin Vega; Gil Rose, producer (Boston Modern Orchestra Project; Boston Children's Chorus)**
- Benjamin: Lessons in Love & Violence
  - George Benjamin, conductor; Stéphane Degout, Barbara Hannigan, Peter Hoare & Gyula Orendt; James Whitbourn, producer (Orchestra of the Royal Opera House)
- Berg: Wozzeck
  - Marc Albrecht, conductor; Christopher Maltman & Eva-Maria Westbroek; François Roussillon, producer (Netherlands Philharmonic Orchestra; Chorus of Dutch National Opera)
- Charpentier: Les Arts florissants; Les Plaisirs de Versailles
  - Paul O'Dette & Stephen Stubbs, conductors; Jesse Blumberg, Teresa Wakim & Virginia Warnken; Renate Wolter-Seevers, producer (Boston Early Music Festival Chamber Ensemble; Boston Early Music Festival Vocal Ensemble)
- Wagner: Lohengrin
  - Christian Thielemann, conductor; Piotr Beczała, Anja Harteros, Tomasz Konieczny, Waltraud Meier & Georg Zeppenfeld; Eckhard Glauche, producer (Festspielorchester Bayreuth; Festspielchor Bayreuth)

Best Choral Performance

- **Duruflé: Complete Choral Works**
  - **Robert Simpson, conductor (Ken Cowan; Houston Chamber Choir)**
- Boyle: Voyages
  - Donald Nally, conductor (The Crossing)
- The Hope of Loving
  - Craig Hella Johnson, conductor (Conspirare)
- Sander: The Divine Liturgy of St. John Chrysostom
  - Peter Jermihov, conductor (Evan Bravos, Vadim Gan, Kevin Keys, Glenn Miller & Daniel Shirley; PaTRAM Institute Singers)
- Smith, K.: The Arc in the Sky
  - Donald Nally, conductor (The Crossing)

Best Chamber Music/Small Ensemble Performance

- **Shaw: Orange – Attacca Quartet**
- Cerrone: The Pieces That Fall to Earth – Christopher Rountree & Wild Up
- Freedom & Faith – PUBLIQuartet
- Perpetulum – Third Coast Percussion
- Rachmaninoff – Hermitage Piano Trio – Hermitage Piano Trio

Best Classical Instrumental Solo

- **Marsalis: Violin Concerto; Fiddle Dance Suite**
  - **Nicola Benedetti; Cristian Măcelaru, conductor (Philadelphia Orchestra)**
- The Berlin Recital
  - Yuja Wang
- Higdon: Harp Concerto
  - Yolanda Kondonassis; Ward Stare, conductor (The Rochester Philharmonic Orchestra)
- The Orchestral Organ
  - Jan Kraybill
- Torke: Sky, Concerto for Violin
  - Tessa Lark; David Alan Miller, conductor (Albany Symphony)

Best Classical Solo Vocal Album

- **Songplay**
  - **Joyce DiDonato; Chuck Israels, Jimmy Madison, Charlie Porter & Craig Terry, accompanists (Steve Barnett & Lautaro Greco)**
- The Edge of Silence – Works for Voice by György Kurtág
  - Susan Narucki (Donald Berman, Curtis Macomber, Kathryn Schulmeister & Nicholas Tolle)
- Himmelsmusik
  - Philippe Jaroussky & Céline Scheen; Christina Pluhar, conductor; L'Arpeggiata, ensemble (Jesús Rodil & Dingle Yandell)
- Schumann: Liederkreis Op. 24, Kerner-Lieder Op. 35
  - Matthias Goerne; Leif Ove Andsnes, accompanist
- A te, o cara
  - Stephen Costello; Constantine Orbelian, conductor (Kaunas City Symphony Orchestra)

Best Classical Compendium

- **The Poetry of Places**
  - **Nadia Shpachenko; Marina A. Ledin & Victor Ledin, producers**
- American Originals 1918
  - John Morris Russell, conductor; Elaine Martone, producer
- Leshnoff: Symphony No. 4 "Heichalos"; Guitar Concerto; Starburst
  - Giancarlo Guerrero, conductor; Tim Handley, producer
- Meltzer: Songs and Structures
  - Paul Appleby & Natalia Katyukova; Silas Brown & Harold Meltzer, producers
- Saariaho: True Fire; Trans; Ciel d'hiver
  - Hannu Lintu, conductor; Laura Heikinheimo, producer

Best Contemporary Classical Composition

- **Higdon: Harp Concerto**
  - **Jennifer Higdon, composer (Yolanda Kondonassis, Ward Stare & The Rochester Philharmonic Orchestra)**
- Bermel: Migration Series for Jazz Ensemble & Orchestra
  - Derek Bermel, composer (Derek Bermel, Ted Nash, David Alan Miller, Juilliard Jazz Orchestra & Albany Symphony Orchestra)
- Marsalis: Violin Concerto in D Major
  - Wynton Marsalis, composer (Nicola Benedetti, Cristian Măcelaru & Philadelphia Orchestra)
- Norman: Sustain
  - Andrew Norman, composer (Gustavo Dudamel & Los Angeles Philharmonic)
- Shaw: Orange
  - Caroline Shaw, composer (Attacca Quartet)
- Wolfe: Fire in My Mouth
  - Julia Wolfe, composer (Jaap Van Zweden, Francisco J. Núñez, Donald Nally, The Crossing, Young People's Chorus of NY City & New York Philharmonic)

=== Music video/film ===
Best Music Video

- **"Old Town Road" (Official Movie) – Lil Nas X & Billy Ray Cyrus**
  - **Calmatic, video director; Candice Dragonas, Melissa Larsen & Saul Levitz, video producers**
- "We've Got to Try" – The Chemical Brothers
  - Ninian Doff, video director; Ellie Fry, video producer
- "This Land" – Gary Clark Jr.
  - Savanah Leaf, video director; Jason Cole, Danielle Hinde, Alicia Martinez & Devin Sarno, video producers, video producers
- "Cellophane" – FKA Twigs
  - Andrew Thomas Huang, video director; Alex Chamberlain, video producer
- "Glad He's Gone" – Tove Lo
  - Vania Heymann & Gal Muggia: video directors; Natan Schottenfels: video producer

Best Music Film

- **Homecoming – Beyoncé**
  - **Beyoncé Knowles-Carter & Ed Burke, video directors; Steve Pamon & Erinn Williams, video producers**
- David Crosby: Remember My Name – David Crosby
  - A.J. Eaton, video director; Cameron Crowe, Michele Farinola & Greg Mariotti, video producers
- Miles Davis: Birth of the Cool – Miles Davis
  - Stanley Nelson, video director; Nicole London, video producer
- Shangri-La – Various artists
  - Morgan Neville, video director; Emma Baiada, video producer
- Anima – Thom Yorke
  - Paul Thomas Anderson, video director; Paul Thomas Anderson, Erica Frauman & Sara Murphy, video producers

== Special Merit Awards ==
=== MusiCares Person of the Year ===
- Aerosmith

=== Lifetime Achievement Award ===
- Chicago
- Roberta Flack
- Isaac Hayes
- Iggy Pop
- John Prine
- Public Enemy
- Sister Rosetta Tharpe

=== Trustees Award ===
- Ken Ehrlich
- Philip Glass
- Frank Walker

=== Technical Grammy Award ===
- George Augspurger

=== Music Educator Award ===
- Mickey Smith Jr. (Maplewood Middle School in Sulphur, Louisiana)

== Multiple nominations and awards ==
American singer Lizzo received the most nominations, with a total of eight. She was followed by Billie Eilish and Lil Nas X, who both received six nominations each. The following received multiple nominations:

List of people receiving at least two nominations

Eight:

- Lizzo

Six:

- Billie Eilish
- Finneas
- Lil Nas X

Five:

- Ariana Grande
- H.E.R.

Four:

- Beyoncé
- Gary Clark Jr.
- J. Cole
- Lucky Daye
- Bob Ludwig
- Ricky Reed
- Tanya Tucker
- Yola
- Thom Yorke

Three:

- Jack Antonoff
- Brandi Carlile
- The Chemical Brothers
- Billy Ray Cyrus
- Lady Gaga
- Chris Gehringer
- John Greenham
- David "Swagg R'celious" Harris
- Nipsey Hussle
- Bon Iver
- Rob Kinelski
- Ezra Koenig
- Marina A. Ledin & Victor Ledin
- Hillary Lindsey
- Manny Marroquin
- Christian McBride
- Vince Mendoza
- PJ Morton
- Roddy Ricch
- Taylor Swift

Two:

- Sam Ashworth
- Dan Auerbach
- Bad Bunny
- BJ the Chicago Kid
- Tommy Brown
- BJ Burton
- Greg Calbi
- Calexico
- Eric Church
- Jacob Collier
- Brad Cook
- YBN Cordae
- DaBaby
- Dan + Shay
- Lana Del Rey
- D'Mile
- Drake
- Dreamville
- For King & Country
- Kirk Franklin
- Gloria Gaynor
- Serban Ghenea
- Danny Gokey
- Joe Grasso
- Phil Hanseroth
- Tim Hanseroth
- Zach Hansen
- Natalie Hemby
- Hit-Boy
- Brittany Howard
- Ethan Hulse
- I Prevail
- Ilya
- I'm With Her
- Iron & Wine
- Rodney Jerkins
- Keith O. Johnson
- Jaycen Joshua
- Eric Lagg
- Miranda Lambert
- Swae Lee
- John Legend
- Morten Lindberg
- Brian Lynch
- Post Malone
- Branford Marsalis
- Wynton Marsalis
- Ashley McBryde
- Lori McKenna
- Randy Merrill
- Chris Messina
- Victoria Monet
- Brendan Morawski
- Jeremy Most
- Donald Nally
- Anderson .Paak
- Dolly Parton
- Jordan Reynolds
- Rival Sons
- Rosalía
- Rüfüs Du Sol
- Ethan Shumaker
- Social House
- Esperanza Spalding
- Tool
- Miki Tsutsumi
- 21 Savage
- Vampire Weekend
- Vinylz
- John Williams
- Hans Zimmer

Billie Eilish and her brother Finneas received the most awards for their work on Eilish's debut album When We All Fall Asleep, Where Do We Go?, with five wins for Billie Eilish and six wins for Finneas. Upon this, Eilish became the first artist to win the major four categories of Record of the Year, Album of the Year, Song of the Year, and Best New Artist in the same year since Christopher Cross in 1981 as well as the youngest artist to do so at the age of 18. The following received multiple awards:

List of people receiving at least two awards

Six:

- Finneas

Five:

- Billie Eilish

Three:

- Gary Clark Jr.
- John Greenham
- Rob Kinelski
- Lizzo

Two:

- The Chemical Brothers
- Jacob Collier
- Billy Ray Cyrus
- For King & Country
- Kirk Franklin
- Lady Gaga
- Nipsey Hussle
- Lil Nas X
- Anderson .Paak
- Tanya Tucker

== In Memoriam ==
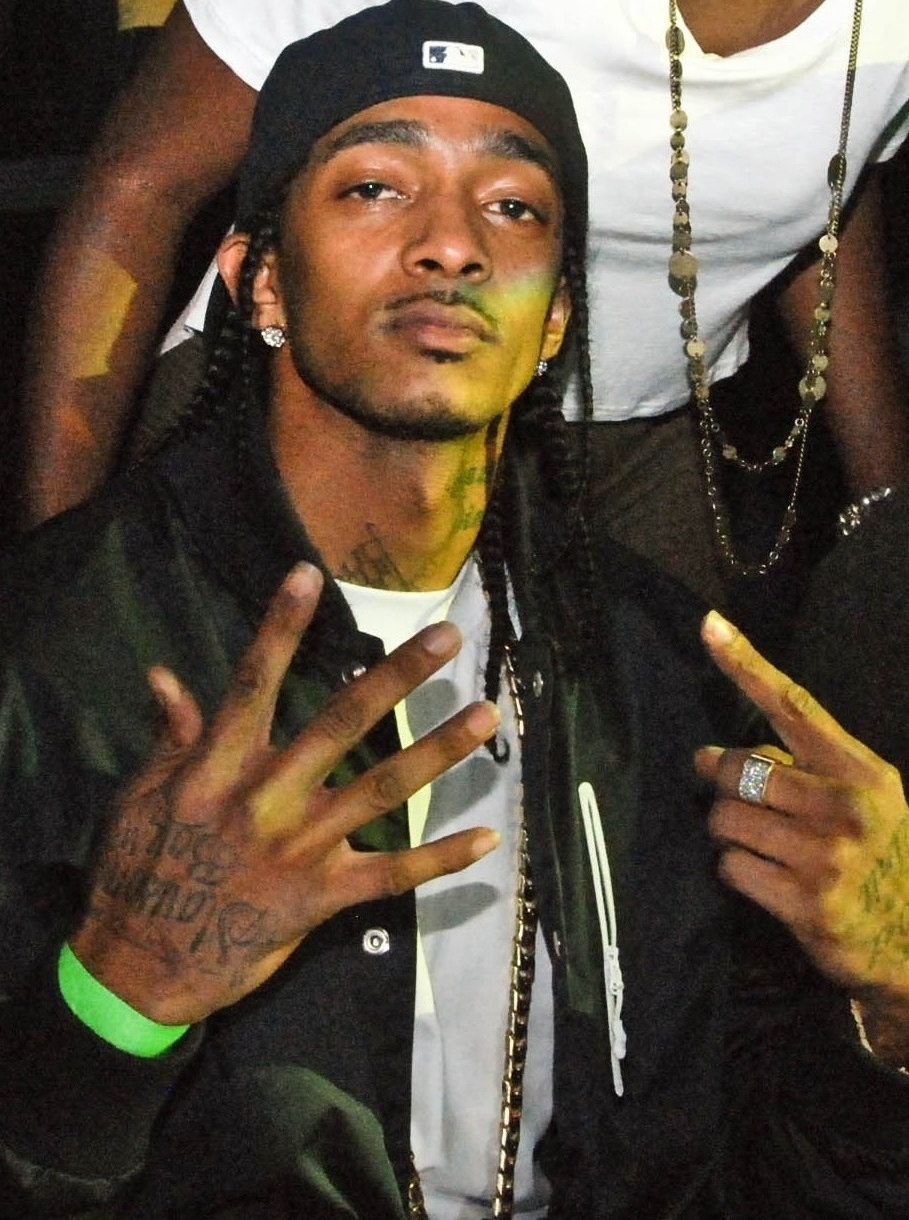
American rapper Nipsey Hussle received two awards posthumously.

A memorial reel featuring the names of musical artists and industry personnel who had died since the previous year's Grammy ceremony was shown during the telecast. The Recording Academy was criticized for omitting notable artists such as David Berman, Mark Hollis, Keith Flint, Bushwick Bill, Scott Walker, Ranking Roger and Robert Hunter during the telecast, but all were mentioned in a longer list of deceased artists on the Grammys website. Ric Ocasek and Camilo Sesto's names were also misspelled in the reel shown during the broadcast.

The individuals listed in the reel, in order of appearance, were:

- Nipsey Hussle
- Juice WRLD
- LaShawn Daniels
- Diahann Carroll
- Doris Day
- Neil Peart
- Ric Ocasek
- Eddie Money
- Ginger Baker
- Hal Blaine
- Emil Richards
- Marie Fredriksson
- Kim Shattuck
- Clydie King
- Katreese Barnes
- Leon Redbone
- Earl Thomas Conley
- Fred Foster
- David Olney
- Phran Galante
- Russell Smith
- Ralph Murphy
- Busbee
- João Gilberto
- José José
- Camilo Sesto
- Beth Carvalho
- Alberto Cortez
- Dan Warner
- Roky Erickson
- Daniel Johnston
- Dick Dale
- Donnie Fritts
- Ed Cherney
- Dave Velte
- Peter Tork
- Neil Innes
- Jimmy Heath
- Jimmy Johnson
- Jack Sheldon
- Jerry Herman
- Hal Prince
- Hugh Fordin
- Elliot Roberts
- Lauren Valencia
- Alex Berdoff
- Allee Willis
- Gary Lemel
- Jessye Norman
- Dominick Argento
- Jack Renner
- André Previn
- Joe Smith
- Jay Frank
- David Saltz
- Eddie Lambert
- Shelley Lazar
- Jim Swindel
- Gary Stewart
- Theresa Jenkins
- Dennis Farnon
- Dave Bartholomew
- Art Neville
- Dr. John
