= Everything (video game) =

2017 simulation video game

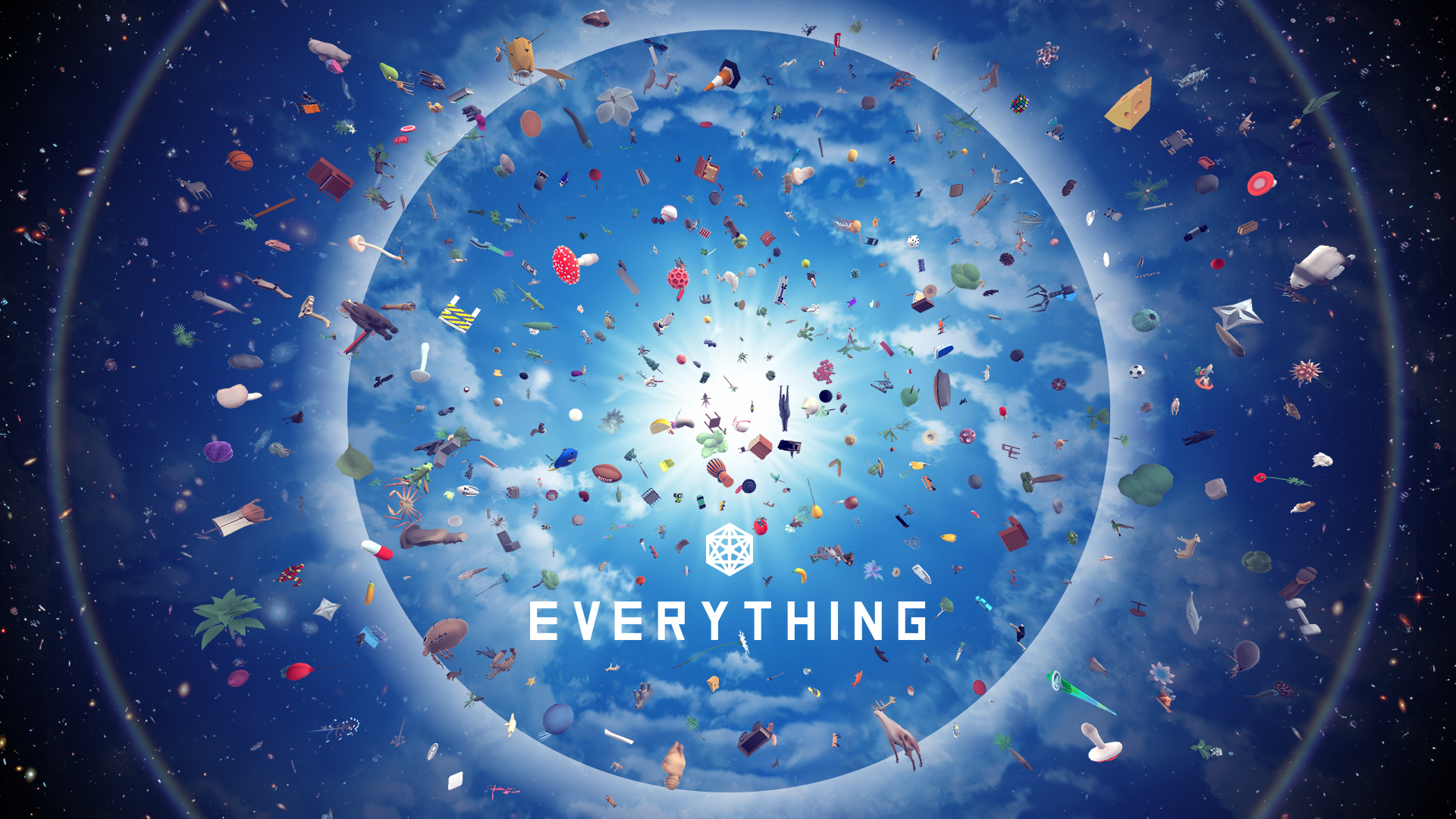
- Developer: David OReilly
- Publisher: Double Fine Productions
- Programmer: Damien Quartz
- Composers: Ben Lukas Boysen & Sebastian Plano
- Engine: Unity
- Platforms: Microsoft Windows, macOS, PlayStation 4, Linux, Nintendo Switch
- Release: PlayStation 4; March 21, 2017; Windows, macOS; April 21, 2017; Linux; April 28, 2017; Nintendo Switch; January 10, 2019
- Genres: Simulation, god game
- Mode: Single-player

Everything is a simulation game developed by artist David OReilly. It was released for the PlayStation 4 on March 21, 2017, for Microsoft Windows and macOS on April 21, 2017, and for Linux on April 28, 2017. A Nintendo Switch version of the game was released on January 10, 2019. It was released in Japan on February 13, 2020. The player takes control of various lifeforms and inanimate objects, exploring the manually generated world and finding new things to control. Everything features quotations from philosopher Alan Watts and has no clear goal aside from occupying more objects within the game.

The game was a primary influence for the climax of the 2022 comedy-drama film Everything Everywhere All at Once.

== Gameplay ==
The player takes the form of any object and can interact with other objects, creating unique behaviors.

Everything is a simulation game where the player can explore a generated universe and control various objects. The player starts as one of many moving creatures. Initially, the player can shift control to any creature or object smaller than the currently occupied one. The scale of gameplay expands or contracts accordingly. Eventually the player can only shift into smaller parts of matter, down to the sub-atomic level, after which the game then allows the player to shift to larger objects. From this point, the player can take forms that include landmasses, planets, and whole star systems. As the player moves and shifts forms, other creatures or objects speak. The game uses many levels of existence, representing different length scales, which the player can move between while shifting into different objects.

When a player bonds with a form for the first time, by moving or singing, that object is added to an in-game encyclopedia catalogued by type. At any time, the player can shift to any previously inhabited form, though this form will be scaled appropriately to the current scale the player is at. Taking the form of a planet in the middle of a street will produce a miniature-sized planet. A goal is to complete this encyclopedia and occupy all available objects. Throughout the game, quotes from philosopher Alan Watts are presented. Once the encyclopedia is complete, a New Game Plus-type mode is unlocked, but starting from any random object.

== Development ==
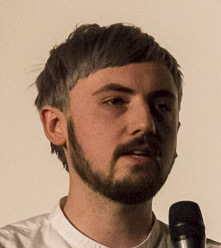
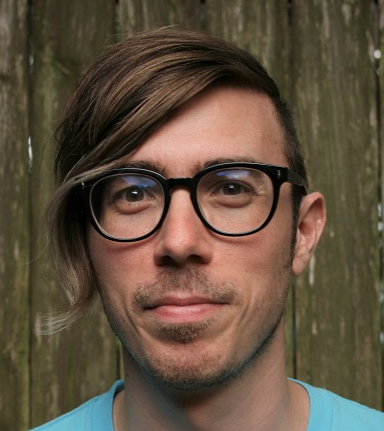
OReilly and Quartz

Everything uses very simple movement animations, such as having creatures roll instead of walk.

Everything was developed by Irish artist David OReilly. He previously had developed the game Mountain, in which players have limited interactions with a virtual mountain. Mountain had been developed using the Unity game engine, which OReilly had to learn. As he worked with it, he saw the potential about representing nature with real-time systems within Unity, forming part of the inspiration for Everything.

The game was published by Double Fine Productions, which had also published Mountain. In the initial announcement, OReilly described the game as "about the things we see, their relationships, and their points of view. In this context, things are how we separate reality so we can understand it and talk about it with each other". He also considered Everything to be a continuation of themes he had introduced in Mountain. Later, OReilly described his hope for players: "I want Everything to make people feel better about being alive. Not as an escape or distraction, or arbitrary frustration, but something you would leave and see the world in a new light." Beside the ideas of Watts, OReilly said that Everything's approach and narrative includes Eastern philosophy, continental philosophy, and stoicism.

The game was developed by a three-person team, including Damien Quartz, who had assisted OReilly in programming Mountain. With the small team on an experimental game, several simplifications were made. For example, creatures do not have walk cycles but instead simply roll to move. OReilly said such decisions, while breaking the reality of the game are "the most interesting solution to particular problems in order to create a totality" for the work. Additionally, OReilly considered how these animations were similar to the work done in early days of classical animation, where artists attempted to animate a wide range of objects. The game's idle auto-play mode captured OReilly's idea that nature occurs independently of any human intervention.

== Reception ==
Reception

Aggregate score
Aggregator	Score
Metacritic	PS4: 80/100; PC: 78/100; NS: 71/100

Review scores
Publication	Score
Computer Games Magazine	6.5/10
Destructoid	7/10
Electronic Gaming Monthly	3/5
Game Informer	8.5/10
GameSpot	6/10
Nintendo Life	7/10
Nintendo World Report	5.5/10
PlayStation Official Magazine – UK	9/10
PC Gamer (US)	80/100
Polygon	9/10
Push Square	8/10
The Guardian	5/5
VideoGamer.com	5/10

Polygon reviewed the game favorably, noting that it is a "magical playpen of being, rather than doing", while also pointing out its confusing, contradictory nature.

An 11-minute trailer, featuring a voice-over by British philosopher Alan Watts, won the Jury Prize at the 2017 Vienna Independent Shorts film festival in May 2017. Due to this, it was on the long list for consideration for the Academy Award for Best Animated Short Film at the 90th Academy Awards, making it the first video game trailer to qualify for the Oscars. Eurogamer ranked the game 37th of the "Top 50 Games of 2017", and Polygon ranked it ninth of the 50 best games of 2017.

The game won the award for "Most Innovative" at the Games for Change Awards, and was nominated for "Best Indie Game" at the Golden Joystick Awards, and for the Off-Broadway Award for Best Indie Game at the New York Game Awards 2018. It was nominated for the "Innovation Award" at the 18th Annual Game Developers Choice Awards, for the "D.I.C.E. Sprite Award" at the 21st Annual D.I.C.E. Awards, and for "Game, Special Class" at the 17th Annual National Academy of Video Game Trade Reviewers Awards. Polygon named the game among the decade's best.

=== In popular culture ===
The game was one of the primary influences for a climactic scene in the 2022 comedy-drama film Everything Everywhere All at Once, specifically the parallel universe in which the protagonist Evelyn Wang and her daughter Jobu Tupaki are rocks.
