= Sebastian Plano =

Argentine cellist, composer and producer

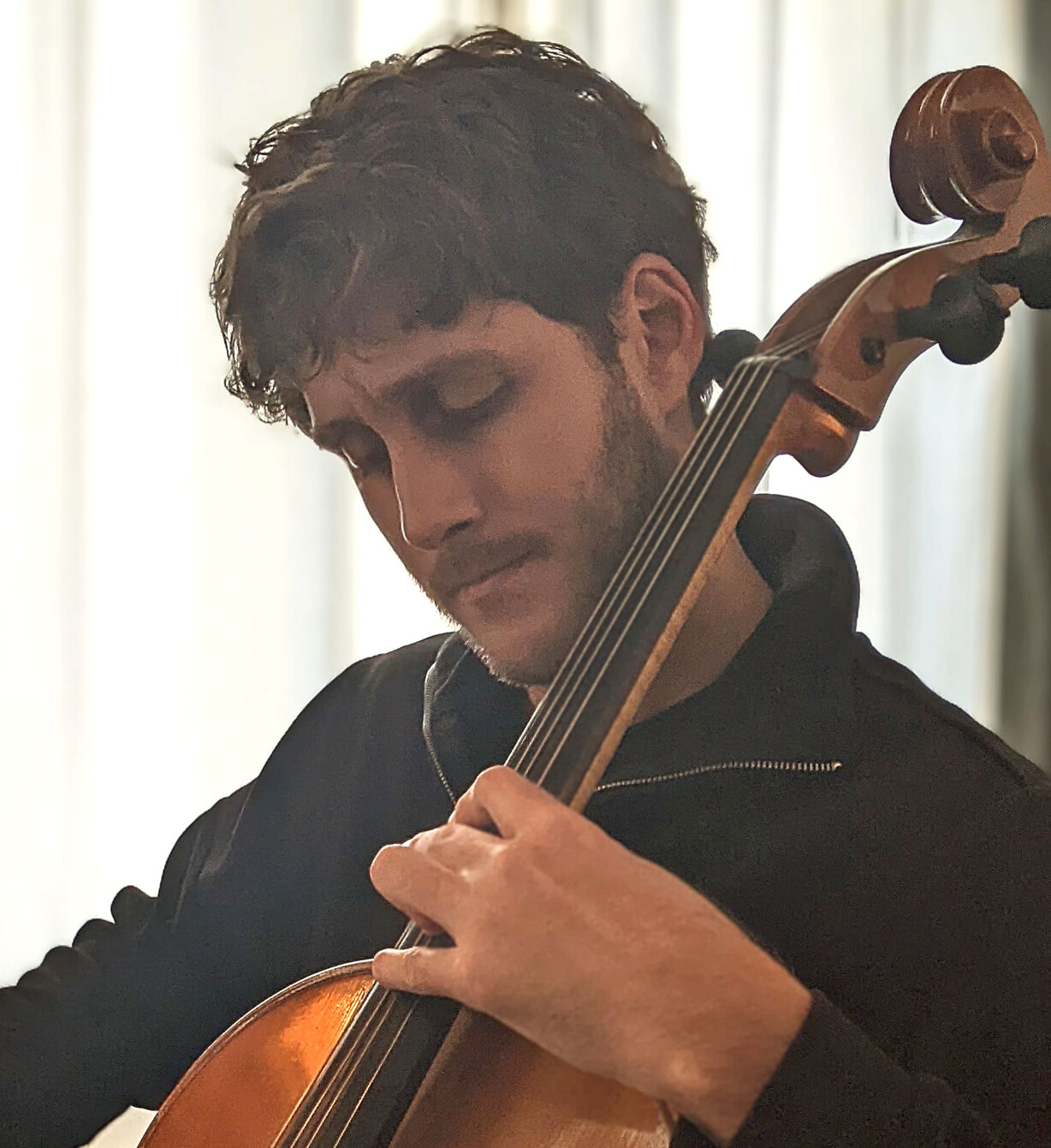
- Plano in 2022

Background information
- Born: Sebastian Plano; 1985 (age 40–41); Rosario, Santa Fe, Argentina
- Genres: Contemporary classical; modern classical
- Instruments: Cello; Piano; Bandoneon; Percussion
- Labels: Mercury KX; Erased Tapes; Denovali
- Website: sebastianplano.com

Sebastian Plano (born 1985) is an Argentinian cellist, composer and producer based in Berlin, Germany. His 2019 album Verve was nominated for Best New Age Album at the 62nd Annual Grammy Awards. He has composed the soundtrack for the video game Everything alongside Ben Lukas Boysen.

== Early life and career ==
Sebastian Plano was born into a musical family in Rosario, Argentina. With both his parents in the city's symphonic orchestra, he was influenced early on by classical music and also by tango through his grandfather, a locally renowned bandoneon player. Plano began playing the cello at age seven, and writing music when he was 12. Soon after his early composition - a four-movement orchestral piece - premiered at Rosario's Opera House in 2008, interest in his work started to show.

At the age of 17, he was among the 4 young musicians to be selected worldwide for a full scholarship at the United World College of the Adriatic, allowing him to study with the acclaimed Trio di Trieste and Cellist Enrico Bronzi. He continued his education in the United States, after having been awarded consecutively full scholarships at the Boston Conservatory and the San Francisco Conservatory. Alongside his classical upbringing, Plano's enthusiasm and exploration around electronic music - often naming Vangelis as a formative early influence - developed into a hobby.

Sebastian Plano started his career as a solo record producer in 2011 with the self-release of his debut album Arrhythmical Part of Hearts. As a medium to promote his music, Plano started busking in the San Francisco subway, selling his new record to the public. His second record Impetus, mastered by Nils Frahm in 2012, was released a year later on Denovali Records along with the re-release of Arrhythmical Part of Hearts.

On April 19 of 2013, Plano just finished recording both his third full-length album Verve and an EP with former Kronos Quartet cellist Jeffrey Zeigler, when a thief broke into Plano's car and stole his computer and two hard drives containing the completed recordings. Despite Plano's endeavours, his work was never recovered. In August of the same year he relocated to Berlin, where he began reconstructing the lost pieces leading to the release of his EP Novel in 2017 and later, Verve.

In 2017 he co-wrote with Ben Lukas Boysen the soundtrack for the game Everything by David OReilly. The soundtrack, released on Erased Tapes Records, was long-listed for the Academy Award for Best Animated Short Film at the 90th Academy Awards, making it the first video game trailer to qualify for the Oscars. That same year, Plano signed to Universal Music's Mercury KX label.

In 2018, Plano participated in the Keynvor Project against sewage pollution, for which he wrote a three-track EP incorporating sounds from the Atlantic Ocean. The EP, titled Preservation, was released by Mercury KX, shortly before the release of Verve in 2019 which received a nomination for Best New Age Album at the 62nd Annual Grammy Awards.

== Discography ==
=== Studio albums ===
- Arrhythmical Part of Hearts (2013)
- Impetus (2013)
- Verve (2019)
- Save Me Not (2021)

=== Singles and EPs ===
- Novel (2017)
- Preservation (with KEYNVOR; 2018)
- Verve Epilogue (2019)
- Fortanach (2022)

=== Collaborations ===
- Everything (with Ben Lukas Boysen; 2017)
- & (with Maarten Vos; 2020)

=== Soundtracks ===
- In too deep (Chris Overton; 2023)
- High Tide (Marco Calvani; 2024)

== Awards and nominations ==
Year	Organization	Award	Work	Result	Ref.
2019	Grammy Awards	Best New Age Album	Verve	Nominated	
