= Mercury KX =

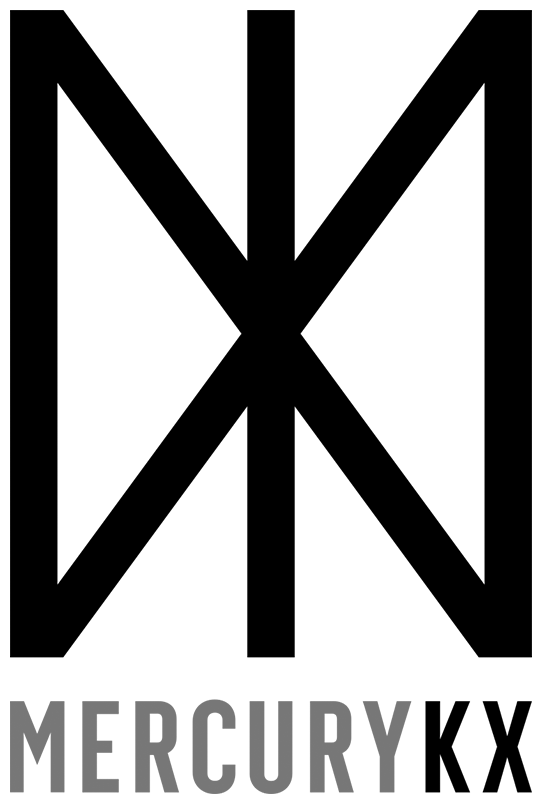
- Parent company: Universal Music Group
- Founded: 2016
- Distributor: Decca Classics
- Genre: Contemporary classical music, electronic, avant-garde music, ambient music
- Country of origin: England
- Location: London
- Official website: www.mercurykx.com

Mercury KX (MKX) is a British, London-based post-classical, electronic, and avant-garde music record label that was founded in 2016. Artists signed to the label have included Ólafur Arnalds, Anoushka Shankar, Guy Sigsworth, Jonny Greenwood, Keaton Henson, Luke Howard, Sebastian Plano, and Lambert.

== History ==
Founded in 2016 and affiliated with London-based Decca Records, it is part of Universal Music Group.

== Artists ==
- Anatole
- Anoushka Shankar
- Bat for Lashes
- Federico Albanese
- Floex
- Guy Sigsworth
- Isobel Waller-Bridge
- Jean-Michel Blais
- Jonny Greenwood
- Keaton Henson
- Lambert (pianist)
- Luke Howard (musician)
- LYR
- Ólafur Arnalds
- Raffertie
- Sebastian Plano
- Solomon Grey
- Sophie Hutchings
- Tom Hodge
- Wayne McGregor

== See also ==
- List of record labels
- Decca Studios, London, England
- Universal Music Group
