= Octocat =

Octocat may refer to:

- Octocat, the mascot of the source-code hosting service GitHub
- Octocat, part cat, part octopus character in Spliced (TV series)
- Octocat Adventure, a five-part animated video by David OReilly (artist)
