= Luke Howard (musician) =

- Origin: Melbourne, Victoria, Australia
- Occupations: Musician, composer
- Instrument: Piano
- Member of: Luke Howard Trio
- Website: lukehoward.com

Luke Howard is an Australian composer and pianist, who plays in the Luke Howard Trio. Three of his albums have been ARIA-nominated. He also works as a record producer.

== Early life and education ==
A piano student growing up in Melbourne, he was encouraged to develop his first improvisations by his piano teacher, Nehama Patkin. Later, he studied at the Victorian College of the Arts.

== Career ==
Howard composes music and plays the piano in the Luke Howard Trio with Jonathan Zion (bass) and Daniel Farrugia (drums).

His album The Sand That Ate the Sea saw him nominated for Best Original Soundtrack, Cast or Show Album at the ARIA Music Awards of 2019. It is the soundtrack of a film by Matthew Thorne that looks at the opal mining town Andamooka, South Australia.

Howard has collaborated with the Brazilian choreographer Juliano Nunes, composing scores for companies including American Ballet Theatre, Birmingham Royal Ballet, Atlanta Ballet, Philadelphia Ballet and The Royal Ballet. His score for Interlinked, a Nunes ballet originally commissioned as part of the Birmingham 2022 Festival, was performed by Birmingham Royal Ballet on the Pyramid Stage at the Glastonbury Festival on 30 June 2024, the company's first appearance at the festival. A recording of the score was released by Mercury KX in October 2024. A second Nunes collaboration, Have We Met?!, was given its world premiere by American Ballet Theatre at the David H. Koch Theater at Lincoln Center on 29 October 2025.

Howard has also worked as a record producer. He was involved in completing Lost at Sea (2023), the debut album by Rob Grant, the father of Lana Del Rey, who sings on two of its tracks; the album was edited and finished from Grant's piano improvisations by Howard and Jack Antonoff and released by Decca Records. In 2026 he co-produced, with François Tétaz, the covers EP Way of the World by the Australian singer Tina Arena, recorded in Melbourne.

== Awards and nominations ==
=== ARIA Awards ===
The ARIA Music Awards is an annual awards ceremony that recognises excellence, innovation, and achievement across all genres of Australian music.

Year	Nominee / work	Award	Result	Ref.
2019	The Sand That Ate the Sea	Best Original Soundtrack, Cast or Show Album	Nominated	
2020	All That Is Not Solid (Live at Tempo Rubato, Australia / 2020)	Best Jazz Album	Nominated	
2022	All Of Us	Best Classical Album	Nominated	

=== Music Victoria Awards ===
The Music Victoria Awards are an annual awards night celebrating Victorian music. They commenced in 2006.

Year	Nominee / work	Award	Result	Ref.
2016	The Electric Night Descends	Best Jazz Album	Nominated	

== Discography ==
=== Albums ===
List of albums with selected details
Title	Details
The Meadowlands (as Luke Howard Trio)	Released: November 2010; Label: Which Way Music (WWM007); Format: CD, digital download
Open Road (with Janos Bruneel)	Released: June 2011; Label: Which Way Music (WWM011); Format: CD, digital download
A Dove, A Lion, A Coast, A Pirate (as Luke Howard Trio)	Released: 2012; Label: Which Way Music (WWM018); Format: CD, digital download
Sun, Cloud	Released: May 2013; Label: Lukktone (LH001); Format: CD, LP, digital download
Two & One	Released: 2014; Label: Lukktone (LH003); Format: CD, LP, digital download
Ten Sails (with Nadje Noordhuis)	Released: March 2015; Label: Lukktone (LH004); Format: CD, LP, digital download
The Electric Night Descends (as Luke Howard Trio)	Released: 2015; Label: Lukktone (LH005); Format: CD, LP, digital download
Two Places	Released: 2016; Label: Lukktone (LH006); Format: 2xCD, LP, digital download
Open Heart Story	Released: May 2018; Label: Lukktone, Mercury KX (00602567041542); Format: CD, LP, digital download
The Sand That Ate the Sea	Released: August 2019; Label: Hobbledehoy (HOB056); Format: LP, digital download
All That is Not Solid (Live at Tempo Rubato, Australia / 2020)	Released: July 2020; Label: Luke Howard; Format: digital download
The Sanctuary (as Luke Howard Trio)	Released: September 2021; Label: Lukktone; Format: CD, LP, digital download
All of Us	Released: April 2022; Label: Mercury KX; Format: CD, digital download
Laulasmaa	Released: March 2023; Label: Mercury KX; Format: digital download
Interlinked	Released: November 2024; Label: Mercury KX; Format: LP, digital download
Galileo	Released: March 2026; Label: Mercury KX; Format: LP, digital download

=== Extended plays ===
List of EP with selected details
Title	Details
Night, Cloud	Released: April 2014; Label: Lukktone (LH002); Format: digital download; Note: Remix EP
Forgotten Postcards	Released: March 2016; Label: 1631 Recordings (MDC030); Format: CD, digital download
Eighty-Eight Days	Released: June 2016; Label: 1631 Recordings (4815524); Format: digital download
More Heart Stories	Released: December 2018; Label: Mercury KX (7720249); Format: digital download
Beating Heart Stories	Released: May 2019; Label: Mercury KX; Format: digital download, streaming; Note: Remix EP
The Shadow (as Luke Howard Trio)	Released: 20 April 2020; Label: Lukktone (LH007) / Hobbledehoy (HOB059); Format: CD, digital download
