= Hedi Schneider Is Stuck =

2015 German film directed by Sonja Heiss

- Directed by: Sonja Heiss
- Starring: Laura Tonke; Hans Löw
- Music by: Lambert
- Release dates: 8 February 2015 (BIFF); 7 May 2015 (Germany)
- Running time: 90 minutes
- Countries: Germany; Norway
- Language: German

Hedi Schneider Is Stuck (German: Hedi Schneider steckt fest) is a 2015 German comedy film directed by Sonja Heiss.

== Cast ==
- Laura Tonke - Hedi Schneider
- Hans Löw - Uli
- Leander Nitsche - Finn
- Melanie Straub - Viviane
- Simon Schwarz - Arne Lange
- Margarita Broich - Hedi's mother
- Matthias Bundschuh - Herr Schild
