= Ben Lukas Boysen =

German musician (born 1981)

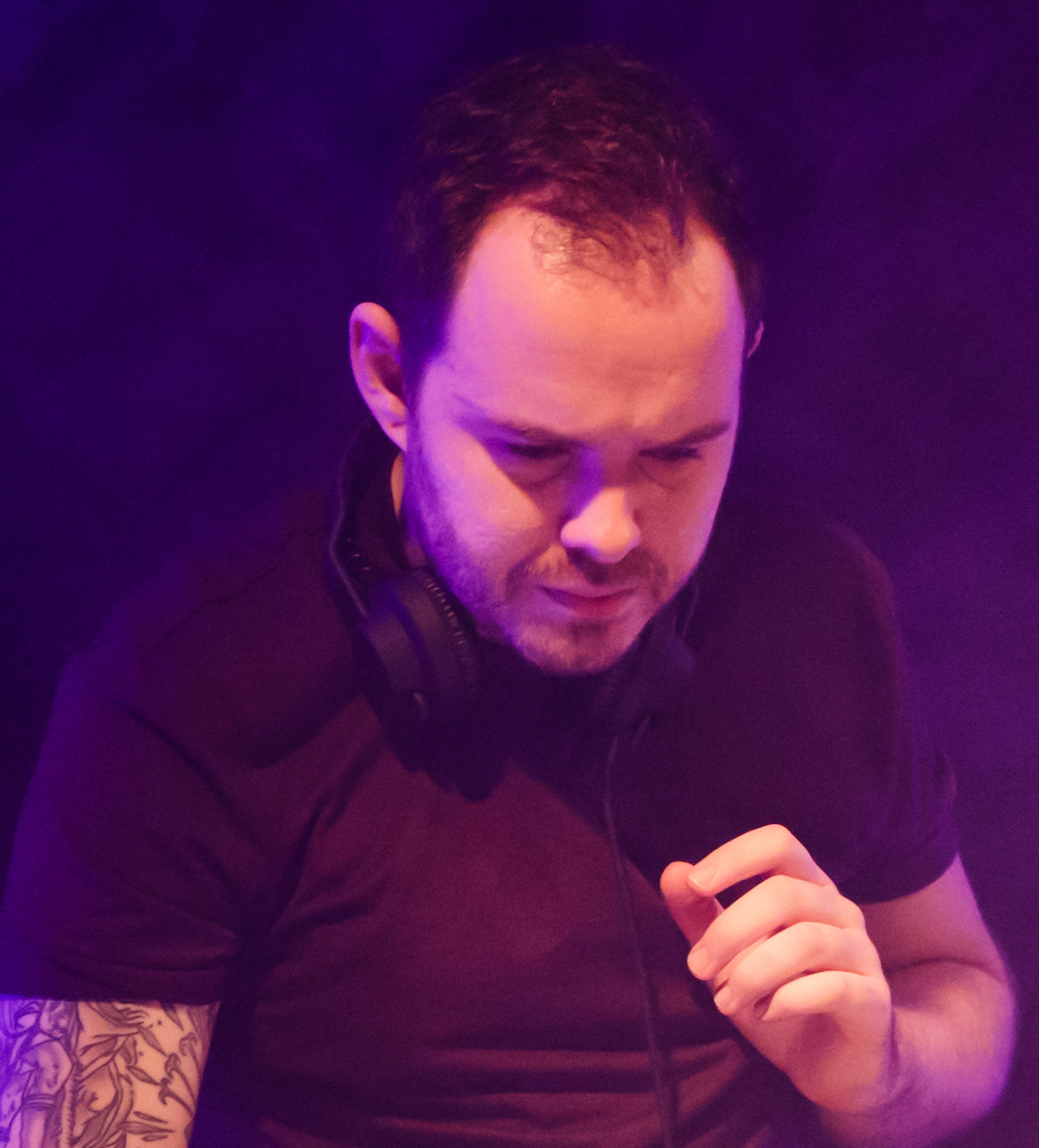
- Boysen in 2014

Background information
- Also known as: Hecq
- Born: 4 September 1981 (age 45); Oldenburg, West Germany
- Genres: Ambient; contemporary classical; electronic
- Years active: 2003–present
- Labels: Erased Tapes, Hymen Records
- Website: benlukasboysen.com

Ben Lukas Boysen (born 4 September 1981), also known by his stage name Hecq, is a German electronic music composer based in Berlin. Known for his emotive and genre-blending compositions, Boysen seamlessly integrates elements of ambient, contemporary classical, and electronic styles into his works.

== Early life ==
Boysen was born in 1981 in Oldenburg, West Germany, the third child of opera singer Deirdre Boysen (née Aselford; 1938–2014) and actor Claus Boysen (1938–2007). He grew up in a creative family; one of his older brothers, Oliver Boysen, pursued an acting career.

Boysen began formal music training at the age of seven, studying piano and classical guitar. Inspired by classical composers such as Anton Bruckner, Richard Wagner, and Johann Sebastian Bach, Boysen developed a strong foundation in traditional music, which later influenced his contemporary compositions.

== Career ==
Boysen moved to Berlin in the early 2000s, where he established Hecq Audio, a studio specialising in sound design and electronic composition. Adopting the alias Hecq, he began releasing music in 2003, exploring a wide range of electronic subgenres, including glitch, ambient, breakcore, IDM, and dubstep. Most of these releases were through the experimental label Hymen Records.

In 2014, Boysen's track "Sleepers Beat Theme" was prominently featured as the opening track of Jon Hopkins's LateNightTales compilation, bringing his music to a wider audience.

In 2016, Boysen signed with the renowned Erased Tapes label and released two solo albums: Gravity (a reissue of his 2013 album) and Spells. These works fused his electronic soundscapes with live instrumentation, such as strings and piano, earning him critical acclaim. His third album, Mirage, released in 2020, further solidified his reputation as a master of blending organic and electronic textures.

In 2024, Boysen released Alta Ripa, his fourth studio album on Erased Tapes. Named after the Roman name of his hometown Altrip, the album reflects on his youth and blends introspective melodies with experimental electronic textures. Boysen described it as "something the 15-year-old in me would have liked to hear but only the grown-up version of myself can write." Critics praised its emotional depth and innovative sound. AllMusic highlighted it as "a finely crafted effort that looks back to the formative era of experimental techno without being a nostalgia trip," while mxdwn noted its balance of "delicate introspection with moments of profound grandeur."

== Soundtracks ==
Boysen has composed music for various media projects, including films, commercials, and video games. In 2017, he collaborated with Sebastian Plano on the critically acclaimed score for the simulation game Everything, a philosophical exploration of interconnectedness. His work has also been featured in projects for prominent clients such as Marvel and Amnesty International.

== Discography ==
=== As Hecq ===
==== Albums ====
- A Dried Youth (Kaleidoskop, 2003)
- Scatterheart (Hymen Records, 2004)
- Bad Karma (Hymen Records, 2005)
- 0000 (Hymen Records, 2007)
- Night Falls (Hymen Records, 2008)
- Steeltongued (Hymen Records, 2009)
- Avenger (Hymen Records, 2011)
- Horror Vacui (Hymen Records, 2013)
- Conversions (Ad Noiseam, 2014)
- Mare Nostrum (Hymen Records, 2015)
- Chansons de Geste (Hymen Records, 2017)

==== Singles and EPs ====
- Zetha (onpa))))), 2007)
- Golden Pines (Binkcrsh, 2008)
- Sura (Ad Noiseam, 2010)
- Spheres of Fury (with Exillon, Contortion, 2011)
- Enceladus (Ad Noiseam, 2012)
- Pain Call (with Skyence, Edged Music, 2013)

=== As Ben Lukas Boysen ===
==== Albums ====
- Infinite Rounds (Grundruck, 2007)
- Gravity (Ad Noiseam, 2013)
- Spells (Erased Tapes Records, 2016)
- Everything (with Sebastian Plano, Erased Tapes Records, 2017)
- Mirage (Erased Tapes Records, 2020)
- Alta Ripa (Erased Tapes Records, 2024)

==== Singles and EPs ====
- Golden Times I (Erased Tapes Records, 2017)
- Grains and Motes (with Neil Cowley, 2019)
- Thesis 16 (with Martin Heyne, Thesis, 2020)
- Clarion (Erased Tapes Records, 2022)

==== Soundtracks ====
- Restive (2012)
- Mother Nature (2013)
- Sleeper's Beat (2014)
- Sundays (2015)
- Beat (with Paul Emmerich, 2018)
- The Collini Case (2019)
- Siren Songs (2021)
- The Lazarus Project (2022)
- Falling Into Place (with Jon Hopkins, 2024)
- Schumacher '94, Die Geburt einer Legende (2026)
