= Lambert (pianist) =

German pianist and composer

Paul Lambert
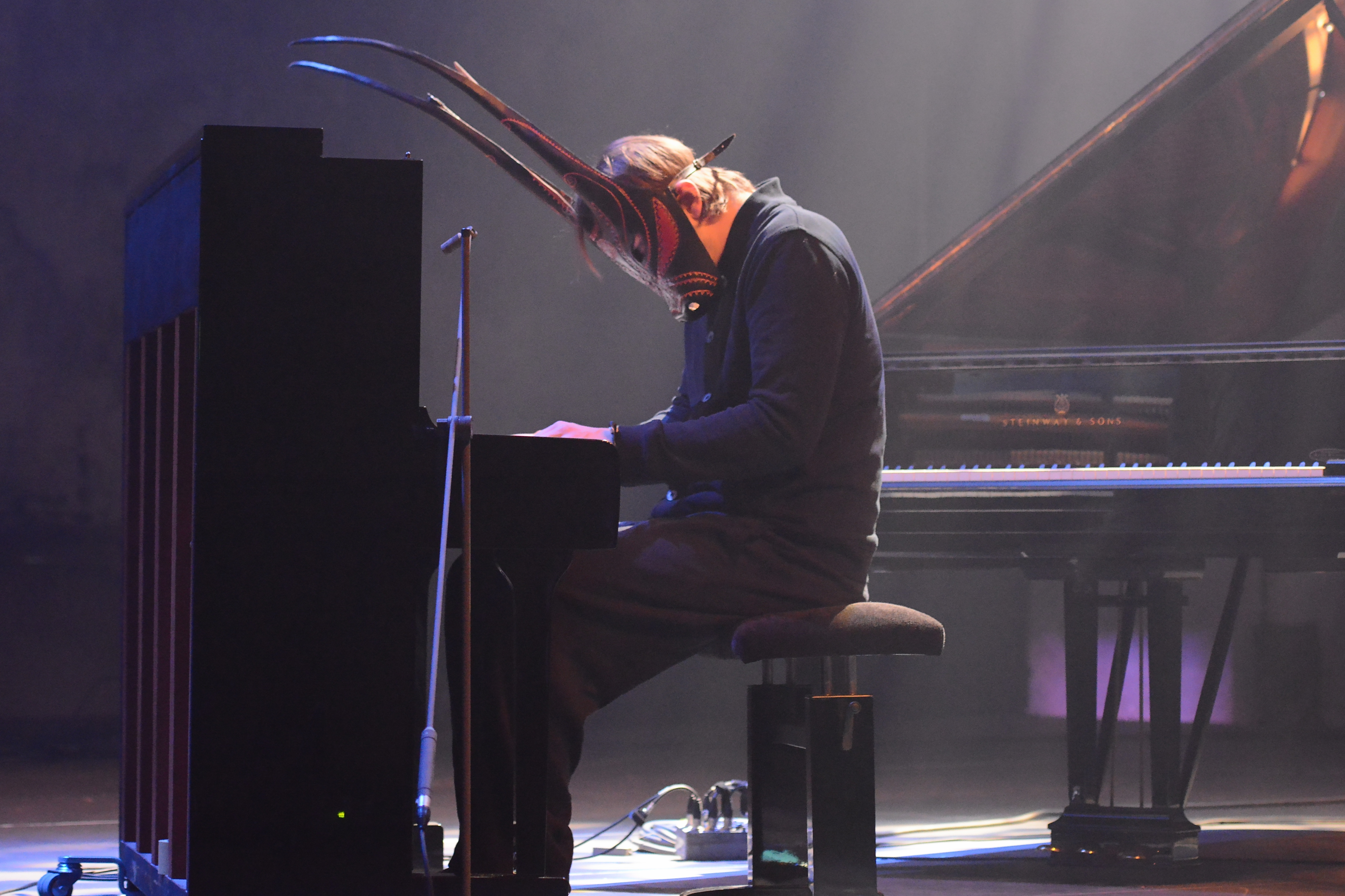

Background information
- Origin: Hamburg, Germany
- Genres: Contemporary classical
- Instrument: Piano
- Years active: 2014–present
- Labels: Mercury KX/Decca/Universal Classics, Staatsakt, Dauw
- Website: listentolambert.com

Lambert is a pianist and composer from Hamburg, Germany. He always performs wearing a Sardinian mask. He composed the music for the 2015 film Hedi Schneider Is Stuck.

== Discography ==
=== Albums ===
- 2014 – Lambert (Staatsakt)
- 2015 – Stay in the Dark (Staatsakt)
- 2016 – Excess / The Improv Tape (Dauw)
- 2017 – Sweet Apocalypse (Mercury KX/Decca/Universal Classics)
- 2018 - We Share Phenomena (collaboration with Brookln Dekker)
- 2019 - True (Mercury KX/Decca/Universal Classics)
- 2020 - False (Mercury KX/Decca/Universal Classics)
- 2022 - Open (Mercury KX/Decca/Universal Classics)
- 2024 — Actually Good (Mercury KX/Decca/Universal Classics)
- 2026 - I am not Lambert (Cloud Hill)

=== EPs ===
- 2016 – Lost Tapes (Staatsakt)
- 2018 – Exodus (collaboration with Stimming) (Kryptox)
- 2019 – Alone (Mercury KX/Decca/Universal Classics)

=== Soundtracks ===
- 2015 – Hedi Schneider is Stuck
- 2020 – Inez & Doug & Kira (Mercury KX/Decca/Universal Classics)
