= Mountain (video game) =

2014 video game

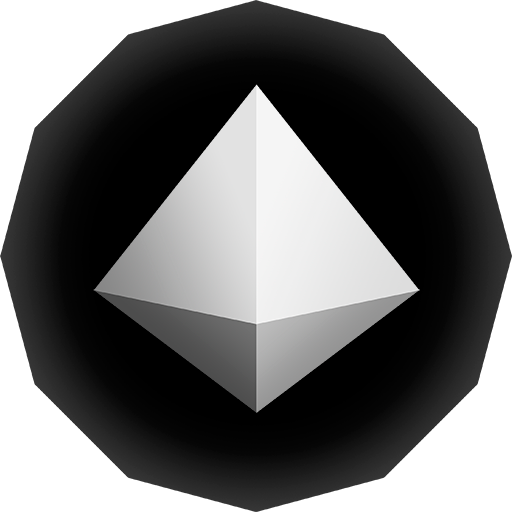
- Developer: David OReilly
- Publisher: Double Fine Productions
- Programmer: Damien Quartz
- Engine: Unity
- Platforms: Microsoft Windows, OS X, Linux, iOS
- Release: WW: July 1, 2014
- Genre: Simulation game
- Mode: Single-player

Mountain is a 2014 simulation video game developed by David OReilly and published by Double Fine Productions. It was released for Microsoft Windows, OS X, Linux, and iOS in July 2014. Mountain features minimal gameplay elements; the only influence the player can have on the game is at its start, where the player is tasked to draw certain objects. The game is designed to be played in the background while the player uses other applications.

== Gameplay ==
Mountain is described by its creator David OReilly as a "Mountain Simulator, Relax em’ up, Art Horror etc." game, featuring little interactivity from the player. Upon starting the game, the player is asked to draw responses to a series of questions, described by OReilly as "more psychologically invasive than anything Facebook wants to know about you". The game uses that input to generate a model of a mountain, floating in space, surrounded by a small sphere of atmosphere. At this point, the game lacks significant interactivity; while the player can rotate the view around the mountain and zoom in and out, they cannot affect the mountain in any way. The game is set to be run in the background as the player does other activities on their computer.

Over the course of the game, the mountain slowly rotates as accelerated time progresses through day and night cycles and through seasonal changes: the player will see snow form and melt on the mountain, plants and trees grow and wither out. Randomly, the mountain may be hit by everyday objects, termed "artefacts," which then become embedded in the mountain indefinitely. The mountain periodically offers its thoughts to the player as the game progresses. After around fifty hours while the game has been running, the mountain meets its fate when it crashes into a passing giant star, ending the game, at which point the player can start the game over with a new mountain. This can be avoided by repeatedly pressing buttons on one's keyboard which forms a shield around the mountain that protects it from getting destroyed.

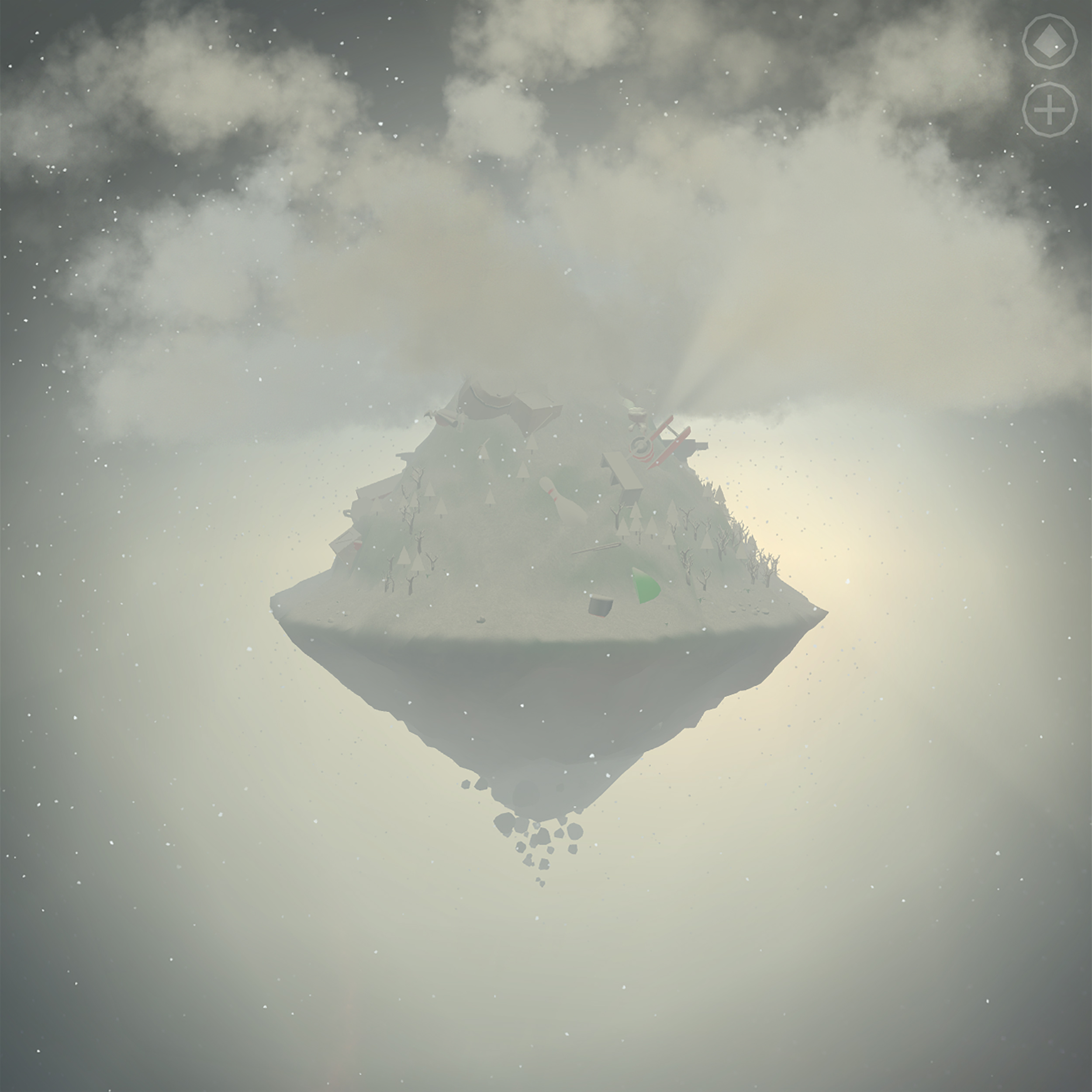
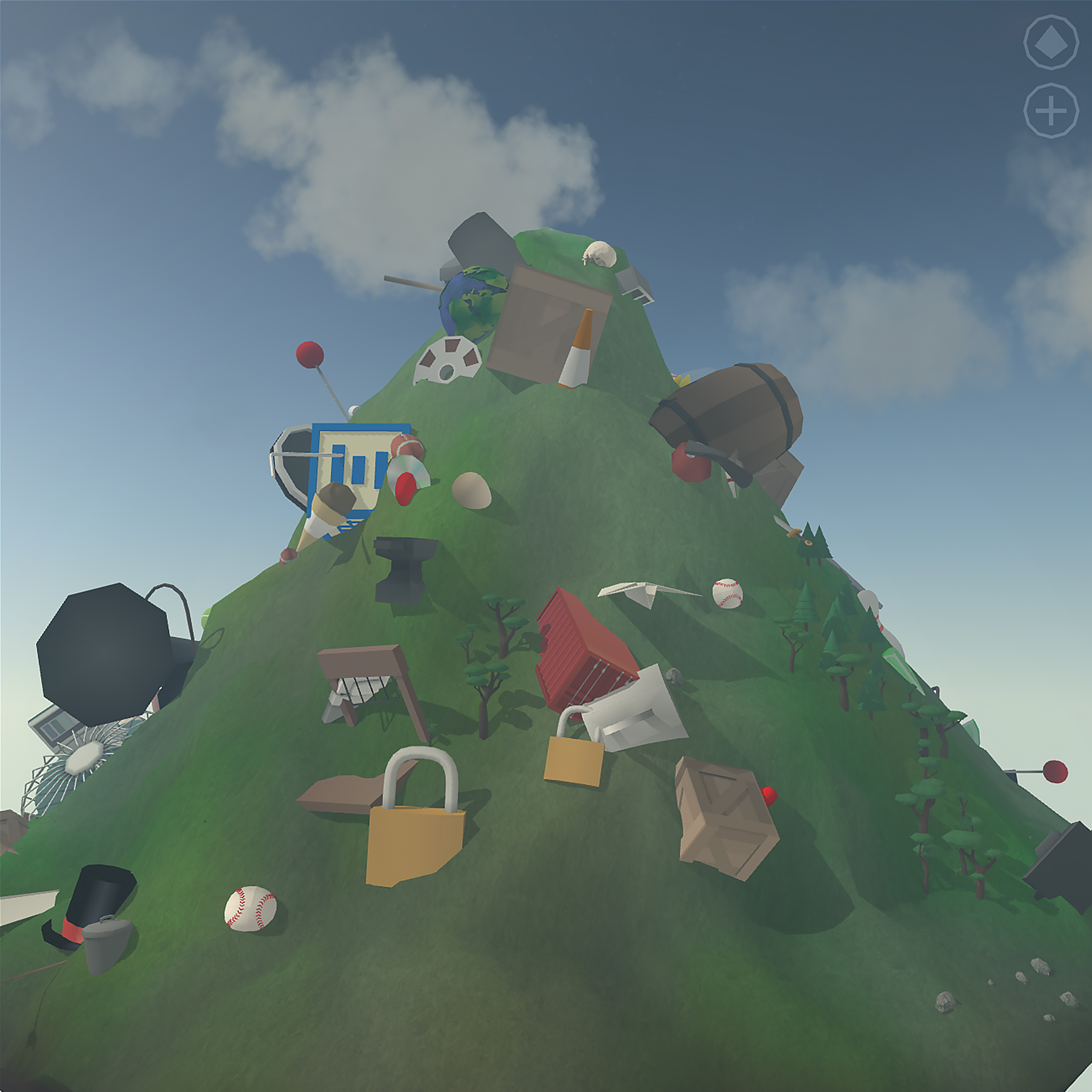
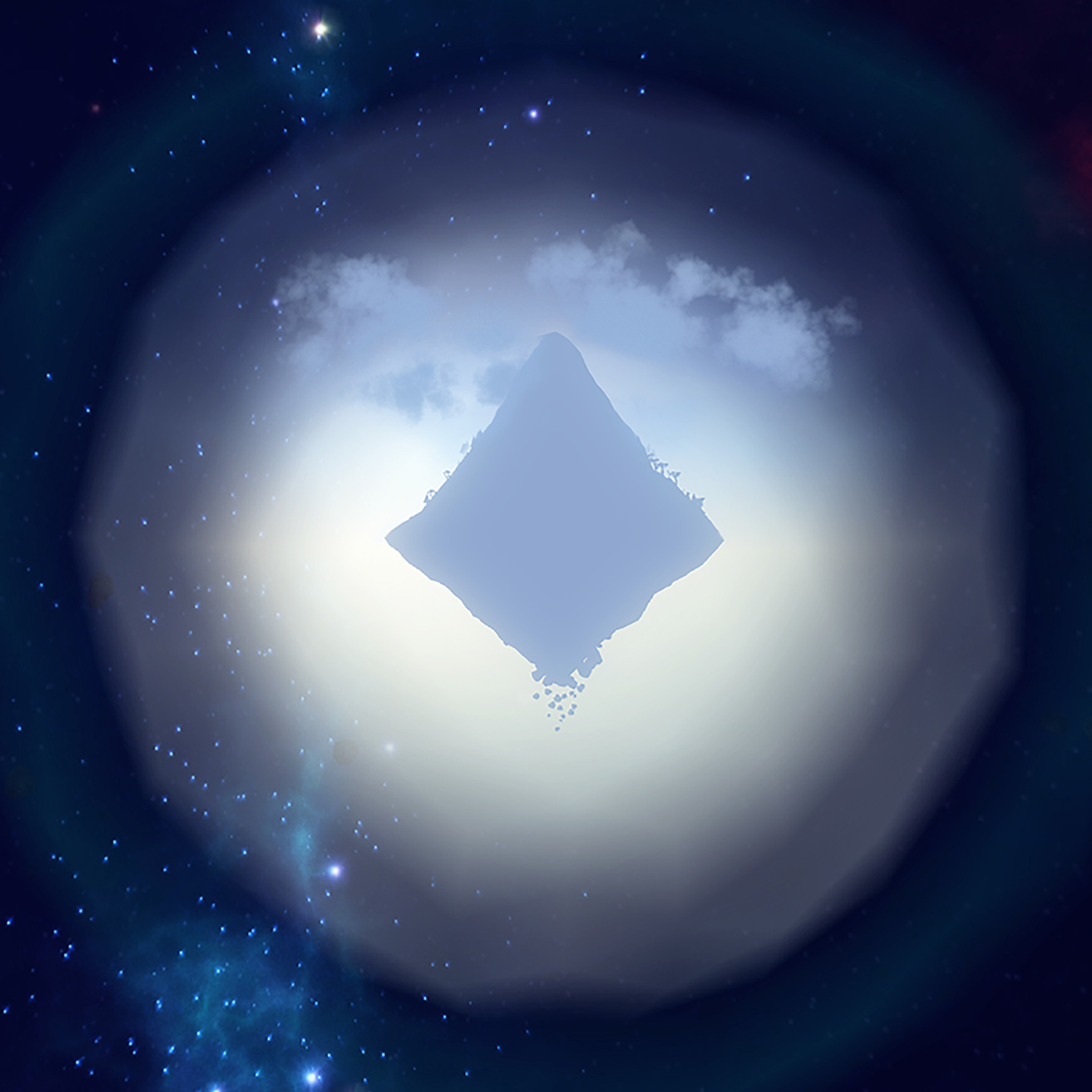
Screenshots and video of gameplay

== Development ==
David OReilly had developed a number of fictional video game sequences for the movie Her (2013). Following his involvement, OReilly had interest in creating a real video game, wanting "to explore in patterns and iterations of patterns". He considered the idea of simulating a mountain as "an iconic zen thing", and that the size of mountains dwarf that of the human experience; mountains further "defy objectification because they can't be owned or put in a museum". OReilly described Mountain as "visual silence", and that it is "about letting go of control" while one watches the simulation.

To develop the game, OReilly started learning the Unity engine himself. To complete Mountain, he gained assistance from Damien Quartz who did most of the game's coding.

OReilly had revealed the game during the Horizon video game showcase held at the Museum of Contemporary Art, Los Angeles during the same week in June as the Electronic Entertainment Expo 2014. The game was published by Double Fine Productions under their "Double Fine Presents" label aimed for small indie games.

The title was initially released on July 1, 2014, for Microsoft Windows, OS X, Linux, and iOS platforms; an Android version was delayed until August 19, 2014, due to the cost of getting the Unity plugin for the operating system. However, official Android support for the game is no longer available. OReilly had initially envisioned the game to run as a background application for personal computers, and thus had not spent a great deal of time optimizing the iOS version through the Unity engine. However, within a week of its release, Mountain was one of the top-selling titles on various app store charts, prompting OReilly to develop more optimization for the iOS and pending Android versions.

In December 2018, Mountain 2.0, a major update to the game, was released for free on its available platforms. Taking about a year to complete, the update was a greater endeavor than the game's first version. It contains numerous additions and improvements, including more artefacts, optimized shaders, and a Slow Motion mode. OReilly largely credits the update's conception to support for the game from its fan community.

In December 2020, OReilly announced that he would be selling the "MOUNTAIN TIME series", videos of the game available to purchase as Non-fungible tokens (NFTs). The announcement post has since been deleted.

== Reception ==
The game was generally praised by reviewers as a novel concept, though because of its limited interactivity, many players were discontent, comparing it merely to a screensaver. Zack Kotzer of Vice compared the game to the Tamagotchi toys, though lacking the constant attention to the toys' demands and instead letting the player decide when to check the mountain's progress. Others described it as a passive Katamari game, watching how the mountain accumulates stuff. Some reviewers found the game pretentious; Ben Kuchera of Polygon said it may have been a joke by OReilly, and that he did not feel the same sense of wonder that other journalists had found in the game.
