= One Day Wonder =

Studio album by Terraza Big Band
- Released: 2019
- Genre: Jazz

One Day Wonder is an album by the Terraza Big Band, a jazz ensemble led by saxophonist Michael Thomas and bassist Edward Perez. It received a Grammy Award nomination for Best Large Jazz Ensemble Album.
