= Triple Helix (album) =

Studio album by Anat Cohen Tentet
- Released: June 14, 2019
- Genre: Jazz

Triple Helix is a studio album by the Anat Cohen Tentet, released in 2019.

The album earned a Grammy Award nomination for Best Large Jazz Ensemble Album.
