= Sekou Andrews =

American spoken word poet, actor, and public speaker

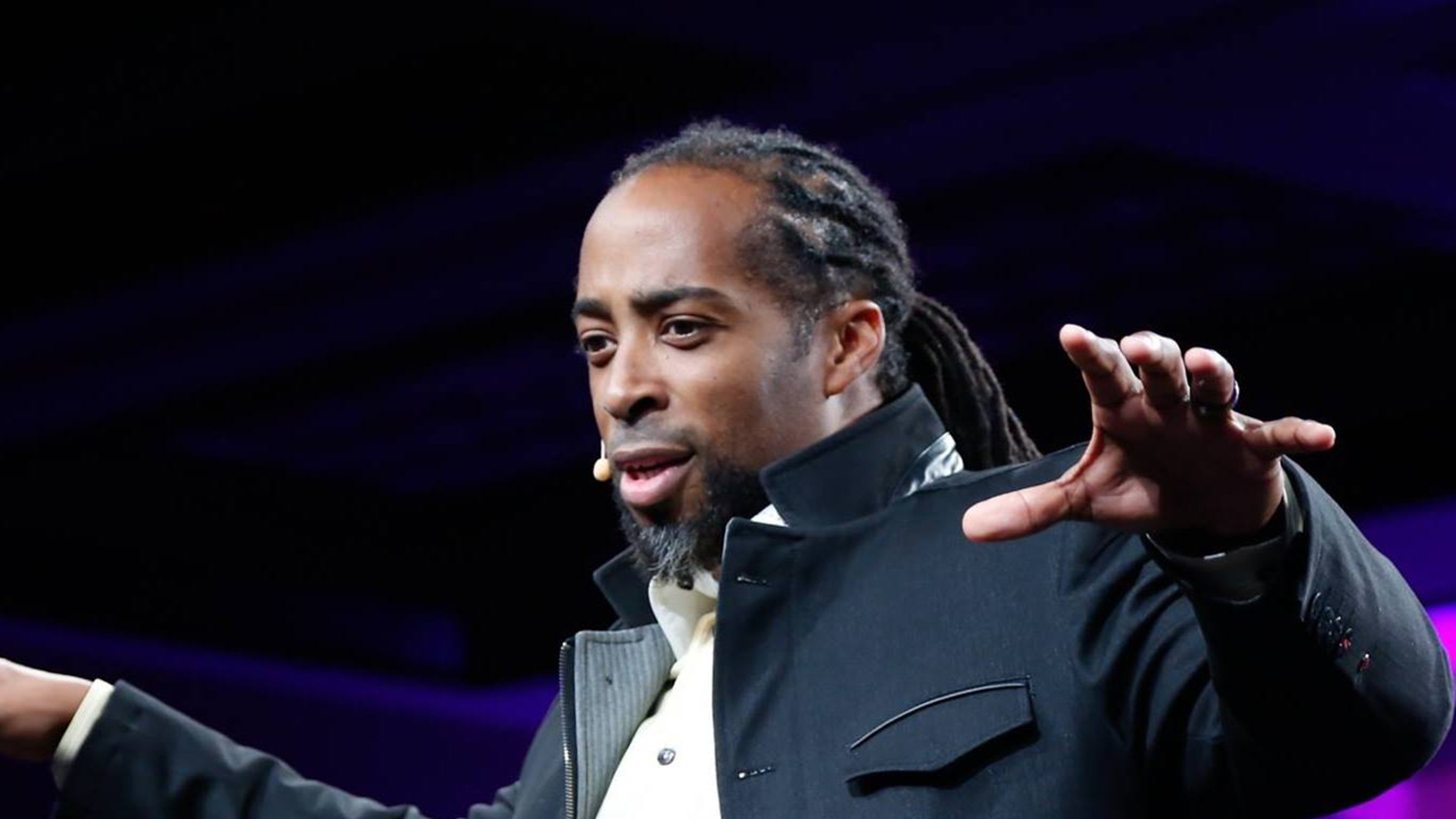
- Andrews performing in 2019
- Born: November 13, 1972 (age 53); Berkeley, California, U.S.
- Education: Pitzer College
- Occupations: Spoken word poet, actor, voice performer, public speaker
- Years active: 1990s–present
- Website: sekouandrews.com

Sekou Andrews (born November 13, 1972) is an American spoken word poet, actor, and public speaker. He is known for developing “poetic voice,” a blend of spoken word poetry and keynote-style presentation used in corporate, arts, and conference settings.

In 2019, Andrews released the album Sekou Andrews & The String Theory. It was nominated for the Grammy Award for Best Spoken Word Album at the 62nd Grammy Awards.

== Early life and education ==
Andrews was born in Berkeley, California. He attended Pitzer College in Claremont, California, where he studied sociology and graduated in 1994.

== Career ==
=== Spoken word poetry ===
Andrews began performing spoken word poetry in Los Angeles in the late 1990s and became active in regional slam competitions. He later earned national visibility through appearances on HBO’s Def Poetry and BET’s spoken word series Lyric Café.

=== Corporate and keynote speaking ===
Andrews expanded into corporate speaking in the 2000s, presenting spoken-word-based keynotes at conferences, leadership summits, and arts events. Forbes described his performance style as “a blend of artistry and practical inspiration.”

=== Collaboration with Steve Connell ===
Andrews partnered with poet and actor Steve Connell in the 2000s on theatrical spoken word productions. Their stage work included The Word Begins, which premiered in Washington, D.C., and earned multiple nominations at the Helen Hayes Awards.

=== Sekou Andrews & The String Theory ===
In 2019, Andrews collaborated with The String Theory, an international orchestral collective. The album combined orchestral music with spoken word poetry.

One track from the project, “Love Says,” received media coverage during the 2020 racial justice protests. ABC News highlighted the poem’s reflection on repeated instances of police brutality.

=== Acting and voice work ===
Andrews has appeared in independent films and documentaries and has provided narration and voice-over work. His screen credits include:

- Def Poetry (2002–2005)
- Lyric Café (2002–2003)
- The Sound of Us (2021)
- Rhymecology: Write Better Rhymes (2021)

== Discography ==
- Seven: A Kwanzaa Soundtrack (1999)
- Poetic License (2008)
- Sekou Andrews & The String Theory (2019)

== Awards and recognition ==
- Grammy nomination – Best Spoken Word Album (2020)
- Multiple Helen Hayes Award nominations for The Word Begins
