= Verve (Sebastian Plano album) =

Studio album by Sebastian Plano
- Released: 2019
- Genre: New Age

Verve is a studio album by Sebastian Plano. The album received a Grammy Award nomination for Best New Age Album.
