= David OReilly (artist) =

Irish filmmaker (born 1985)

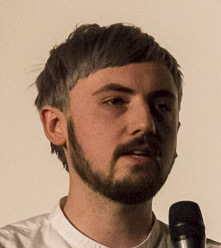
- OReilly in 2017
- Born: 21 June 1985 (age 41); Kilkenny, Ireland
- Website: davidoreilly.com

David OReilly (born 1985) is an Irish artist, film maker and game developer based in Los Angeles, California.

== Work ==
=== Animation ===
OReilly began his animation career at the age of 14, where he worked at Cartoon Saloon.

Aside from a 1-minute film entitled Ident, from which he draws his logo, the earliest work available on his website is WOFL2106. This short draws equally on original designs and popular internet memes to create a disturbing landscape of serenity juxtaposed with chaos. This film sets the tone for his entire œuvre, though the direct inclusion of outside memes disappears in his later work.

He created several animation sequences and props for the 2007 film Son of Rambow, as well as animation for the "guide" sequences in The Hitchhiker's Guide to the Galaxy, with Shynola.

He created the first video for Irish rock band U2's single "I'll Go Crazy If I Don't Go Crazy Tonight". The video was released on U2.com on 21 July 2009.

In 2007, he produced the surreal short film "RGB XYZ" which tells the story of a young man kicked out of his parents' house to work in the big city, while using low poly graphics, compression artefacts, text to speech voices, jarring colour palettes, and discordant tones.

His short film Please Say Something was awarded the Golden Bear at the 2009 Berlin International Film Festival, Best Narrative Short at the 2009 Ottawa International Animation Festival and several other awards.

His short film, The External World, premiered at the 67th Venice Film Festival and the 2011 Sundance Film Festival, and has since won over forty awards on its festival circuit including the IFTA for Best Animation.

He wrote, directed, produced and animated the Adventure Time episode "A Glitch Is a Glitch" for Cartoon Network, becoming the first guest director in the network's 20-year history.

In 2013 he worked on the Spike Jonze movie Her as animation director on the sequences where the characters are playing video games.

=== Octocat Adventure ===
On 13 March 2008, a YouTube user named RANDYPETERS1, supposedly a 9-year-old boy from Chicago, submitted a hand-drawn animated video about Octocat, a red cat head with eight long legs looking for his parents. The videos featured crude Microsoft Paint animation and a loud, high-pitched, childlike voice narrating. On 7 September, the fifth, final episode was released, but featured an unexpected twist – at about 25 seconds in, the crude sketchy animation switched to intricately crafted 3D with an orchestral soundtrack; the whole Octocat story (and as such, the Randy Peters persona) was revealed to be by David OReilly.

=== Video games ===
David announced his first game Mountain at MOCA Los Angeles in June 2014, and released it the following month in partnership with Double Fine Productions for personal computers and mobile devices. Mountain features little interactivity but allows the player to create and watch a solitary mountain floating in space as it offers its thoughts to the player, and as random objects collide and become embedded within it. It was generally praised by critics, noting it as a subversion of what one normally expects for a video game.

In 2016, OReilly announced a second game, Everything, a "simulator of everything", on which the player can play as anything, from bacteria to galaxies. Everything was released on 21 March 2017 on PlayStation 4, with Windows and Mac versions to follow on 21 April 2017. Everything became the first realtime project to qualify for an Academy Award.

== Style ==
OReilly's work is often characterised by the use of intentionally stripped down 3d graphics. He is known for popularising the use of low-poly 3d and the use of 3d software as a personal and artistic tool, as outlined in his 2009 essay "Basic Animation Aesthetics". He was an early adopter of glitch effects and uses elements of the software used inside his work. "[David] has been the man to lead animation through a conceptual blockage—3D animation was being dominated by commercial aesthetics....he deconstructed 3D to the point of absurdity." OReilly has cited Norman McLaren and Andrei Tarkovsky as influences on his work.

== Video games ==
- Everything (2017)
- Mountain (2014)

== Short films ==
- The External World (2010, 17 min)
- Please Say Something (2009, 10 min)
- Octocat Adventure (2008, 6 min)
- Serial Entoptics (2008, 10 min)
- RGB XYZ (2007, 12 min)
- Wofl2106 (2006, 4 min)
- ?????

== Music videos ==
- "Szamár Madár" (Venetian Snares, 2005, 4 min)
- "I'll Go Crazy If I Don't Go Crazy Tonight" (U2, 2009, 4 min)
