= Cory Wong discography =

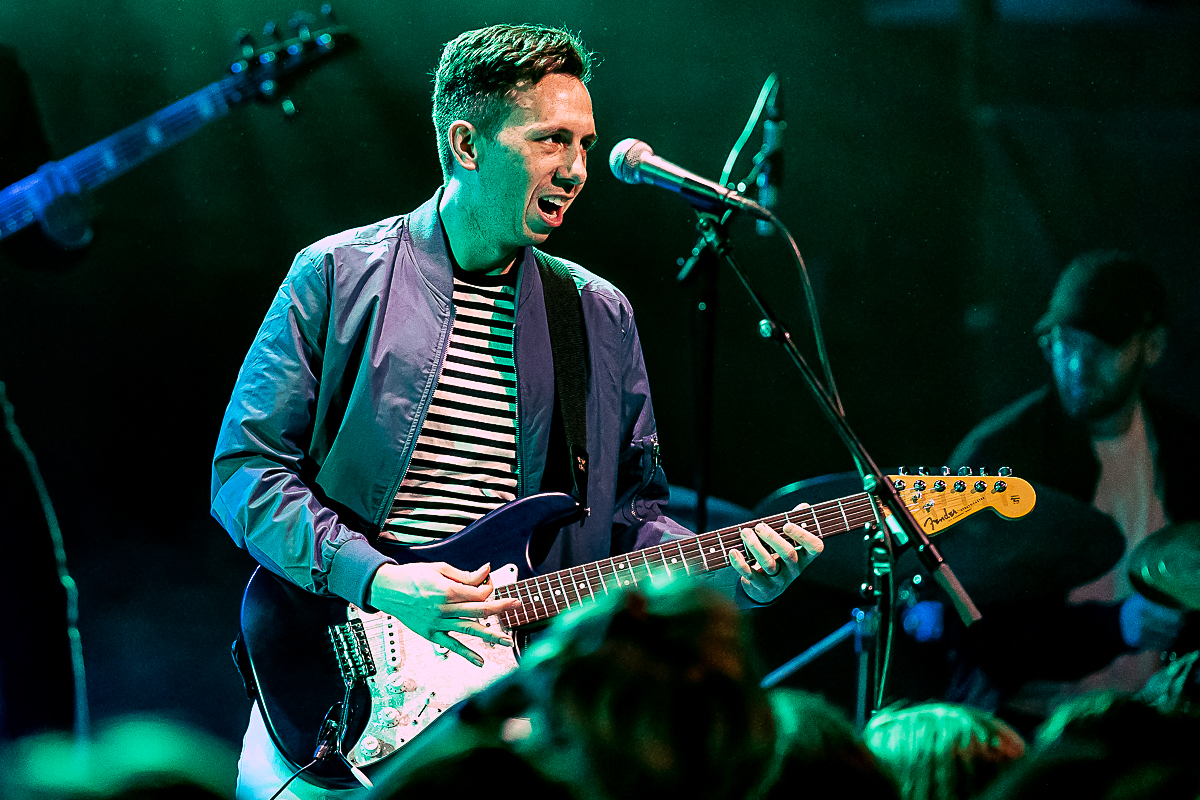
- Studio albums: 14
- EPs: 1
- Live albums: 15
- Singles: 40
- As featured artist: 16
- Collaboration albums: 5
- Other appearances: 65

The discography of American guitarist Cory Wong which consists of 19 studio albums (14 solo albums, three with The Fearless Flyers, and one with Cory Wong Quartet), four collaboration albums, ten live albums, one EP, 56 singles (40 as a lead artist and 16 as a featured artist), and over 60 other appearances.

== Albums ==
=== Studio albums ===
==== Solo albums ====
List of albums, with selected chart positions
Title	Album details	Peak chart position	
Title	Album details	US Jazz	US Contemp Jazz
Becoming	Released: 2010; Label: Self-released; Format: Digital download	—	—
Quartet/Quintet	Released: 2012; Label: Self-released; Format: CD, digital download	—	—
Cory Wong and The Green Screen Band	Released: September 22, 2017; Label: Self-released; Format: CD, digital download, streaming	—	13
The Optimist	Released: August 17, 2018; Label: Self-released; Format: Vinyl, digital download, streaming	19	14
Motivational Music for the Syncopated Soul	Released: August 2, 2019; Label: Self-released; Format: Vinyl, digital download, streaming	16	7
Elevator Music for an Elevated Mood	Released: January 10, 2020; Label: Self-released; Format: Vinyl, digital download, streaming	—	14
Trail Songs : Dusk	Released: July 12, 2020; Label: Roundwound; Format: Vinyl, digital download, streaming	—	—
Trail Songs (Dawn)	Released: August 7, 2020; Label: Roundwound; Format: Vinyl, digital download, streaming	—	—
The Striped Album	Released: October 23, 2020; Label: Roundwound; Format: Vinyl, digital download, streaming	—	—
Cory Wong & The Wongnotes	Released: February 5, 2021; Label: Roundwound; Format: Vinyl, digital download, streaming	—	—
Wong's Cafe	Released: January 7, 2022; Label: Vulf; Format: Vinyl, digital download, streaming	—	—
Power Station	Release: April 29, 2022; Label: Roundwound; Format: Vinyl, digital download, streaming	—	—
The Lucky One	Released: August 18, 2023; Label: Roundwound; Format: Vinyl, digital download, streaming	—	—
Starship Syncopation	Released: July 26, 2024; Label: Roundwound; Format: Vinyl, digital download, streaming	—	—
Lost in the Wonder	Released: February 3, 2026; Label: Roundwound; Format: Vinyl, digital download, streaming		
"—" denotes a recording that did not chart or was not released in that territory.

==== Cory Wong Quartet ====
Title	Album details
Even Uneven	Released: September 22, 2008; Label: Innovative Multimedia; Format: Digital download

==== The Fearless Flyers ====
Title	Album details
The Fearless Flyers	Released: May 23, 2018; Label: Vulf; Format: Vinyl, digital download, streaming
The Fearless Flyers II	Released: May 3, 2019; Label: Vulf; Format: Vinyl, digital download, streaming
Tailwinds	Released: July 24, 2020; Label: Vulf; Format: Vinyl, digital download, streaming
The Fearless Flyers III	Released: March 4, 2022; Label: Vulf; Format: Vinyl, digital download, streaming
The Fearless Flyers IV	Released: February 9, 2024; Label: Vulf; Format: Vinyl, digital download, streaming
The Fearless Flyers V	Released: May 16, 2025; Label: Vulf; Format: Vinyl, digital download, streaming
Live in Italy	Released: September 25, 2025; Label: Roundwound; Format: Vinyl, digital download, streaming

=== Collaborations ===
List of albums, with selected chart positions
Title	Album details	Peak chart position	
Title	Album details	US Jazz	US Contemp Jazz
Pena (Peña and Cory Wong)	Released: October 12, 2010; Label: Secret Stash; Format: CD	—	—
Meditations (Jon Batiste and Cory Wong)	Released: May 29, 2020; Label: Self-released; Format: Digital download, streaming	—	—
The Golden Hour (Dave Koz and Cory Wong)	Released: June 11, 2021; Label: Just Koz; Format: CD, digital download, streaming	16	5
Turbo (Cory Wong and Dirty Loops)	Released: September 3, 2021; Label: Roundwound; Format: Vinyl, digital download, streaming	16	3
Starship Syncopation (Cory Wong with Metropole Orkest and Jules Buckley)	Release: July 26, 2024; Label: Roundwound; Format: Vinyl, digital download, streaming	—	—
"—" denotes a recording that did not chart or was not released in that territory.

=== Live albums ===
Title	Album details	Ref.
Live in Minneapolis	Released: March 21, 2019; Label: Self-released; Format: Digital download, streaming, vinyl	
Live on the Lido Deck	Released: June 3, 2019; Label: Self-released; Format: Digital download, streaming	
Live in the U.K.	Released: June 14, 2019; Label: Self-released; Format: Digital download, streaming	
Live in Amsterdam (Cory Wong and Metropole Orkest)	Released: April 3, 2020; Label: Self-released; Format: Digital download, streaming, vinyl	(Note: Live in Amsterdam peaked at No. 10 on Billboard's Classical Crossover Albums.)
Live at First Avenue	Released: June 12, 2020; Label: Self-released; Format: Digital download, streaming	
The Syncopate & Motivate Tour (Set 1)	Released: September 15, 2020; Label: Roundwound; Format: Digital download, streaming	
The Syncopate & Motivate Tour (Set 2)	Released: September 15, 2020; Label: Roundwound; Format: Digital download, streaming	
The Paisley Park Session	Released: October 28, 2021; Label: Roundwound; Format: Digital download, streaming, vinyl	
Wong on Ice	Released: December 23, 2021; Label: Self-released; Format: Digital download, streaming	(Note: Wong on Ice is a Bandcamp exclusive that was recorded at the Minnesota Ice Arena.)
The Power Station Tour (West Coast)	Released: January 20, 2023; Label: Roundwound; Format: Digital download, streaming, vinyl	
The Power Station Tour (East Coast)	Released: May 5, 2023; Label: Roundwound; Format: Digital download, streaming, vinyl	
Cory Wong Live at Montreux Jazz Fest	Released: December 1, 2023; Label: Roundwound; Format: Digital download, streaming	
"Live in London"	Released: May 24, 2024; Label: Roundwound; Format: Digital download, streaming	
Wong Air (Live in America)	Released: January 24, 2025; Label: Roundwound; Format: Digital download, streaming	
On A Random Tuesday (Live At The Blue Note) featuring Joshua Redman	Released: July 28, 2026; Label: Roundwound; Format: Digital download, streaming	

== Extended plays ==
Title	Details
MSP, Pt. 1	Released: August 12, 2016; Label: Self-released; Format: Digital download, streaming

== Singles ==
=== As lead artist ===
Title	Year	Album	Ref.
"Jax"	2018	The Optimist	
"Light as Anything (featuring Robbie Wulfsohn)	2018	The Optimist	
"Friends at Sea" / "The Optimist" (with Dave Koz)	2018	The Koz Nod	(Note: Koz Nod is the name of a two-song single.)
"Want Me Back" / "Better" (with Cody Fry and Dynamo)	2019	08.26.18	(Note: 08.26.18 is the name of a two-song single.)
"Limited World" (featuring Caleb Hawley)	2019	Motivational Music for the Syncopated Soul	
"Home" (featuring Jon Batiste)	2019	Motivational Music for the Syncopated Soul	
"Home (Alternate Take)"	2019	Non-album single	
"Golden" (featuring Cody Fry)	2020	Elevated Music for an Elevated Mood	
"Meritage"	2020	Non-album single	
"Blackbird"	2020	Trail Songs : Dusk	
"Bluebird" (featuring Chris Thile)	2020	Trail Songs (Dawn)	
"Massive" (featuring Joe Satriani)	2020	The Striped Album	
"Design" (featuring Kimbra)	2020	The Striped Album	
"Smooth Move"	2020	The Striped Album	
"Coming Back Around" (featuring Cody Fry)	2021	Cory Wong & The Wongnotes	
"United" (featuring Antwaun Stanley)	2021	Cory Wong & The Wongnotes	
"Today" (with Dave Koz)	2021	The Golden Hour	
"Getaway Car" (with Dave Koz)	2021	The Golden Hour	
"Follow the Light" (with Dirty Loops)	2021	Turbo	
"Ring of Saturn" (with Dirty Loops)	2021	Turbo	
"Smokeshow"	2021	Wong's Cafe	
"Disco De Lune"	2021	Wong's Cafe	
"You Got to be You"	2021	Wong's Cafe	
"Power Station"	2022	Power Station	
"Crisis" (featuring Big Wild)	2022	Power Station	
"J.A.M. (Just a Minute)" (featuring Chromeo)	2022	Power Station	
"Look at Me" (featuring Allen Stone)	2023	The Lucky One	
"Ready" (featuring Ben Rector)	2023	The Lucky One	
"Hiding on the Moon" (featuring O.A.R.)	2023	The Lucky One	
"The Grid Generation" (featuring Louis Cole)	2023	The Lucky One	
"Call Me Wild" (featuring Dodie)	2023	The Lucky One	
"On My Mind" (Alexander 23 with Cory Wong)	2024	Non-album single	
"Burning" (with Metropole Orkest and Jules Buckley)	2024	Starship Syncopation	
"Quotidian Fields" (with Metropole Orkest and Jules Buckley)	2024	Starship Syncopation	
"Tongue Tied" (featuring Stephen Day)	2025	Lost in the Wonder	
"Lost in the Wonder" (featuring Benny Sings)	2025	Lost in the Wonder	
"Blame It on the Moon" (featuring Magic City Hippies)	2025	Lost in the Wonder	
"One Way Road" (featuring Yam Haus)	2026	Lost in the Wonder	
"Better Than This"	2026	Lost in the Wonder	
"Lisa Never Wanted to be Famous" (featuring Theo Katzman)	2026	Lost in the Wonder	

=== As featured artist ===
Title	Year	Album	Ref.
"Line by Line" (Prep featuring Cory Wong and Paul Jackson Jr.)	2018	Non-album single	
"Money" (Lexsoul Dancemachine featuring Cory Wong)	2020	Lexsplosion II	
"This Dream" (Marc Scabilia featuring Cory Wong)	2020	Seed of Joy	
"Adventure" (Alex Bone featuring Cory Wong)	2021	Falling on Infinity	
"Spare Tire" (Ariel Posen with Cory Wong)	2021	Non-album singles	
"Joyful Strut" (The Snowman Band featuring St. Paul Peterson, Kevin Gastonguay, and Cory Wong)	2022	Non-album singles	
"I'll Take That Dare" (KOATS featuring Cory Wong)	2022	Non-album singles	
"Jelly" (Brother Strut featuring Cory Wong)	2023	Non-album singles	
"Todome no Ichigeki" (Vaundy featuring Cory Wong)	2023	replica	
"Everything Smells Like Salmon" (Tom McGovern featuring Cory Wong)	2024	Non-album singles	
"The Power of Love" (Grace Kelly featuring Cory Wong)	2024	Non-album singles	
"Tunnel" (Huntertones featuring Cory Wong)	2024	Motionation	
"Hey Blue" (Rei featuring Cory Wong)	2024	Non-album singles	
"Targets" (Night Talks featuring Cory Wong)	2025	Non-album singles	
"Strangers" (Ripe featuring Cory Wong)	2025	Non-album singles	
"Sunset" (Tim Henson featuring Plini and Cory Wong)	2025	Non-album singles	(Note: "Sunset" was originally released in 2022 as a showcase of their individual Neural DSP Archetype plugins but released as a single on streaming services in 2025.)
"IRL" (Devon Gilfillian featuring Cory Wong)	2026	Non-album singles	(Note: "IRL" that does not feature Cory Wong is on Devon Gifillian's 2026 album "Time Will Tell." The three-song single also has the album version and the song "Hourglass.")

== Production and songwriting ==
These are writing and production credits for music outside of Wong's own solo work.

Title	Year	Artist	Album	Notes	Ref.
—N/a	2016	Vulfpeck	The Beautiful Game	Writer - Tracks 2, 3, 4, 6, 8, 9, 10	
"The Ace of Aces"	2018	The Fearless Flyers	The Fearless Flyers	Writer	
"Barbara"	2018	The Fearless Flyers	The Fearless Flyers	Writer	
"Bicentennial"	2018	The Fearless Flyers	The Fearless Flyers	Writer; Producer	
—N/a	2019	Phoebe Katis	Honesty	Producer	
—N/a	2019	The Fearless Flyers	The Fearless Flyers II	Writer; Producer	
—N/a	2020	Phoebe Katis	It's Ok to Cry	Producer	
"Money"	2020	Lexsoul Dancemachine	Lexplosion II	Co-writer	
"Nate Smith is the Ace of Aces"	2020	The Fearless Flyers	Tailwinds	Co-writer - Tracks 1, 2, 3, 4, 6, 8	
"Introducing the Delta Force"	2020	The Fearless Flyers	Tailwinds	Writer; Producer	
"Colonel Panic"	2020	The Fearless Flyers	Tailwinds	Co-writer; Producer	
"Ambush"	2020	The Fearless Flyers	Tailwinds	Writer	
Kauai	2020	The Fearless Flyers	Tailwinds	Writer	
—N/a	2021	Phoebe Katis	Sweet Reunion	Producer	
"On My Mind"	2024	Alexander 23 (featuring Cory Wong)	—N/a	Co-writer	
"—" denotes he didn't contribute to just one song, but multiple songs or an entire album.

== Other appearances ==
Title	Year	Credited artist(s)	Album	Ref.
"Animal Spirits"	2016	Vulfpeck	The Beautiful Game	
"Dean Town"	2016	Vulfpeck	The Beautiful Game	
"Conscious Club"	2016	Vulfpeck	The Beautiful Game	
"1 for 1, DiMaggio"	2016	Vulfpeck	The Beautiful Game	
"Margery, My First Car"	2016	Vulfpeck	The Beautiful Game	
"Aunt Leslie"	2016	Vulfpeck	The Beautiful Game	
"Cory Wong"	2016	Vulfpeck	The Beautiful Game	
"Mr. Finish Line"	2017	Vulfpeck (featuring Christine Hucal and Theo Katzman)	Mr Finish Line	
"Tee Time"	2017	Vulfpeck	Mr Finish Line	
"Hero Town"	2017	Vulfpeck (featuring Michael Bland)	Mr Finish Line	
"Half of the Way"	2018	Vulfpeck (featuring Theo Katzman)	Hill Climber	
"Darwin Derby"	2018	Vulfpeck	Hill Climber	
"Love is a Beautiful Thing"	2018	Vulfpeck (featuring Theo Katzman and Monica Martin)	Hill Climber	
"For Survival"	2018	Vulfpeck (featuring Mike Viola)	Hill Climber	
"Lost My Treble Long Ago"	2018	Vulfpeck	Hill Climber	
"Disco Ulysses (Instrumental)"	2018	Vulfpeck	Hill Climber	
"The Cup Stacker"	2018	Vulfpeck	Hill Climber	
"It Gets Funkier IV"	2018	Vulfpeck (featuring Louis Cole)	Hill Climber	
"20s"	2019	Phoebe Katis	Honesty	
"Touches"	2019	Phoebe Katis	Honesty	
"Make Believe"	2019	Phoebe Katis	Honesty	
"Anyway"	2019	Phoebe Katis	Honesty	
"All It Takes"	2019	Phoebe Katis	Honesty	
"Maybe"	2019	Phoebe Katis	Honesty	
"Honesty"	2019	Phoebe Katis	Honesty	
"Zurück Ins Studio"	2019	Marti Fischer	Album Eins	
"Promenade"	2019	Marti Fischer (featuring Davis Schulz)	Album Eins	
"Die Farbe Null"	2019	Marti Fischer	Album Eins	
"Der Gang"	2019	Marti Fischer (featuring Make a Move)	Album Eins	
"Cameron"	2019	Marti Fischer	Album Eins	
"Apfelschorle"	2019	Marti Fischer	Album Eins	
"Öde"	2019	Marti Fischer	Album Eins	
"Nicht Cool"	2019	Marti Fischer (featuring Davis Schulz)	Album Eins	
"Nebelmaschine"	2019	Marti Fischer	Album Eins	
"Muse"	2019	Marti Fischer (featuring Tommy Blackout and Miirtek)	Album Eins	
"Bernstein Gold"	2019	Marti Fischer	Album Eins	
—N/a	2019	Vulfpeck (Jack Stratton, Theo Katzman, Woody Goss, Joe Dart), Cory Wong, Michael Winograd, Joey Dosik, Richie Rodriguez, Melissa Gardiner, Nate Smith, Dave Koz, Chris Thile, Charles Jones, Ryan Lerman, Antwaun Stanley, Mark Dover, Chris Grymes	Live at Madison Square Garden	
"Wait for the Moment"	2019	Woody Goss Trio	A Very Vulfy Christmas	
"Hollywood Witches"	2020	Woody and Jeremy	Strange Satisfaction	
"Under the Sky So Blue"	2020	Evan Marien (EMAR)	EMAR Vol. 3 - Minus Bass	
"Welcome to Bacon Road"	2020	Evan Marien (EMAR)	EMAR Vol. 3 - Minus Bass	
—N/a	2020	Fearless Flyers	Tailwinds	
"It's Ok to Cry"	2020	Phoebe Katis	It's Ok to Cry	
"You Make Everything Better"	2020	Phoebe Katis	It's Ok to Cry	
"Placebo"	2020	Phoebe Katis	It's Ok to Cry	
"Better Than This"	2020	Phoebe Katis	It's Ok to Cry	
"Sometimes It's Meant to Hurt"	2020	Phoebe Katis	It's Ok to Cry	
"Let Me Lose You"	2020	Phoebe Katis	It's Ok to Cry	
"The Way We Feel"	2020	Phoebe Katis	It's Ok to Cry	
"3 on E"	2020	Vulfpeck	The Joy of Music, The Job of Real Estate	
"Test Drive (Instrumental)"	2020	Vulfpeck	The Joy of Music, The Job of Real Estate	
"Radio Shack"	2020	Vulfpeck	The Joy of Music, The Job of Real Estate	
"LAX"	2020	Vulfpeck (featuring Joey Dosik)	The Joy of Music, The Job of Real Estate	
"Something"	2020	Vulfpeck	The Joy of Music, The Job of Real Estate	
"Paris"	2021	Phoebe Katis	Sweet Reunion	
"Never Be a Cool Girl"	2021	Phoebe Katis	Sweet Reunion	
"It Takes Two"	2021	Phoebe Katis	Sweet Reunion	
"Hope We're Happier"	2021	Phoebe Katis	Sweet Reunion	
"How Far We Come"	2021	Phoebe Katis	Sweet Reunion	
"Crypto Cowboy"	2022	Potash Twins (featuring Cory Wong)	Hornography	
"Somebody to You"	2023	Cody Fry (featuring Vincen Garcia and Cory Wong)	The End	
"Old Skool Funk"	2025	Matt Johnson (featuring Triple H Horns, Jeff Lorber, and Cory Wong)	Warrior Princess	
"Skunk"	2026	Bump2Soul (featuring Cory Wong)	Bump2's	
"Spark It"	2026	Jack Gardiner (featuring Cory Wong)	Kintsugi	
"—" denotes he wasn't on one song, but an entire album.
