= Schvitz =

Studio album by Vulfpeck
- Released: 30 December 2022
- Genre: Funk; soul
- Length: 34:27
- Label: Vulf Records
- Producer: Jack Stratton

Vulfpeck chronology
The Joy of Music, the Job of Real Estate (2020)	Schvitz (2022)	Clarity of Cal (2025)

Singles from Schvitz
- 1. "Sauna" Released: 25 November 2022; 2. "Earworm" Released: 2 December 2022; 3. "New Guru" Released: 9 December 2022; 4. "All That's Left of Me is You" Released: 16 December 2022; 5. "Simple Step" Released: 23 December 2022; 6. "In Heaven" Released: 30 December 2022

Schvitz is the sixth studio album by the American funk band Vulfpeck, released on 30 December 2022 through their own label, Vulf Records. It is their first album to feature Cory Wong, Antwaun Stanley and Joey Dosik as prominent performers on all or most tracks. Announced in November 2022, the album was preceded by six singles.

== Background ==
In October 2020, the band issued their fifth studio album, The Joy of Music, the Job of Real Estate, containing five original tracks with the remainder consisting of previously released material. Vulfpeck also released four compilation albums under the Vulf Vault header from 2020 to 2022, with each one focusing on a different band member.

All band members contributed and performed on 2022 Cory Wong's album Wong's Cafe. In August, frontman Jack Stratton released the first studio album under his solo alias Vulfmon, Here We Go Jack, featuring contributions from David T. Walker, Monica Martin and Mike Viola.

On 8 July 2022, Vulfpeck performed at the Levitate Music & Arts Festival in Marshfield, Massachusetts. It was their first live appearance since their headlining Madison Square Garden concert in 2019.

== Release ==
The album's title, release date, track listing and artwork were announced on 25 November 2022, alongside the release of lead single "Sauna". Schvitz is a Yiddish word for a steambath, and the videos were recorded in a sauna with the band dressed in robes and hats. Graphic designer Pseudodudo handled the cover artwork. A new single was then released every week for the next six weeks, with "In Heaven" concluding the album's rollout on 30 December. The day after Schvitz was issued, the band livestreamed a telethon on YouTube.

== Reception ==
Professional ratings
Review scores
Source	Rating
Financial Times	3/5 stars

In a three-star review for the Financial Times, Ludovic Hunter-Tilney concluded the album's "good humour is irresistible", highlighting "Sauna" as a "breezy piece of pop-funk plotted and arranged with pinpoint attentiveness".

== Track listing ==
No.	Title	Writer(s)	Length
1.	"Sauna"	Woody Goss; Jack Stratton	3:15
2.	"Earworm"	Stratton	2:24
3.	"New Guru" (feat. Antwaun Stanley)	Stratton; Jacob Jeffries	3:24
4.	"All That's Left of Me is You" (feat. Theo Katzman)	Theo Katzman	2:52
5.	"Simple Step" (feat. Antwaun Stanley)	Antwaun Stanley; Stratton; Justin Douglas; Katzman; Joey Dosik	2:45
6.	"In Heaven" (feat. Antwaun Stanley)	Dosik	3:36
7.	"Serve Somebody" (feat. Antwaun Stanley)	Bob Dylan	4:22
8.	"Romanian Drinking Song"	Stratton	3:52
9.	"What Did You Mean by Love?" (feat. Antwaun Stanley)	Katzman	4:33
10.	"Miracle"	Stratton; Jeffries	3:24
Total length:			34:27

Notes

- "Simple Step" is a cover of funk band Groove Spoon's 2010 song of the same name, of which Stratton, Dart, and Stanley were members.
- "In Heaven" is a cover of Joey Dosik's 2018 song of the same name.
- "Serve Somebody" is a cover of Bob Dylan's 1979 song "Gotta Serve Somebody".
- "What Did You Mean By Love?" is a cover of Theo Katzman's 2019 song "What Did You Mean (When You Said Love)".

== Personnel ==
Vulfpeck

- Joe Dart – bass guitar (all tracks)
- Woody Goss – Wurlitzer (1–3, 5, 7–10), piano (4), guitar (6)
- Theo Katzman – vocals (1, 3–7, 10), guitar (2, 6, 9), drums (3, 5, 7–8), Wurlitzer (4), kazoo (8)
- Jack Stratton – drums (1, 4, 9–10), keyboard (3, 7), piano (5), percussion (6), Wurlitzer (8), vocals (2)

Other musicians

- Joey Dosik – piano (1, 7), saxophone (2–3, 5, 8), vocals (3–5, 7, 10), organ (4, 9), guitar (6)
- Jacob Jeffries – vocals (3, 10)
- Antwaun Stanley – vocals (1, 3–7, 9–10), drums (2)
- Cory Wong – guitar (all tracks)

Technical

- Jack Stratton – mixing (1–5, 7–10), overdubs (3)
- Nick Nagurka – engineer (all tracks)
