= Vulfpeck discography =

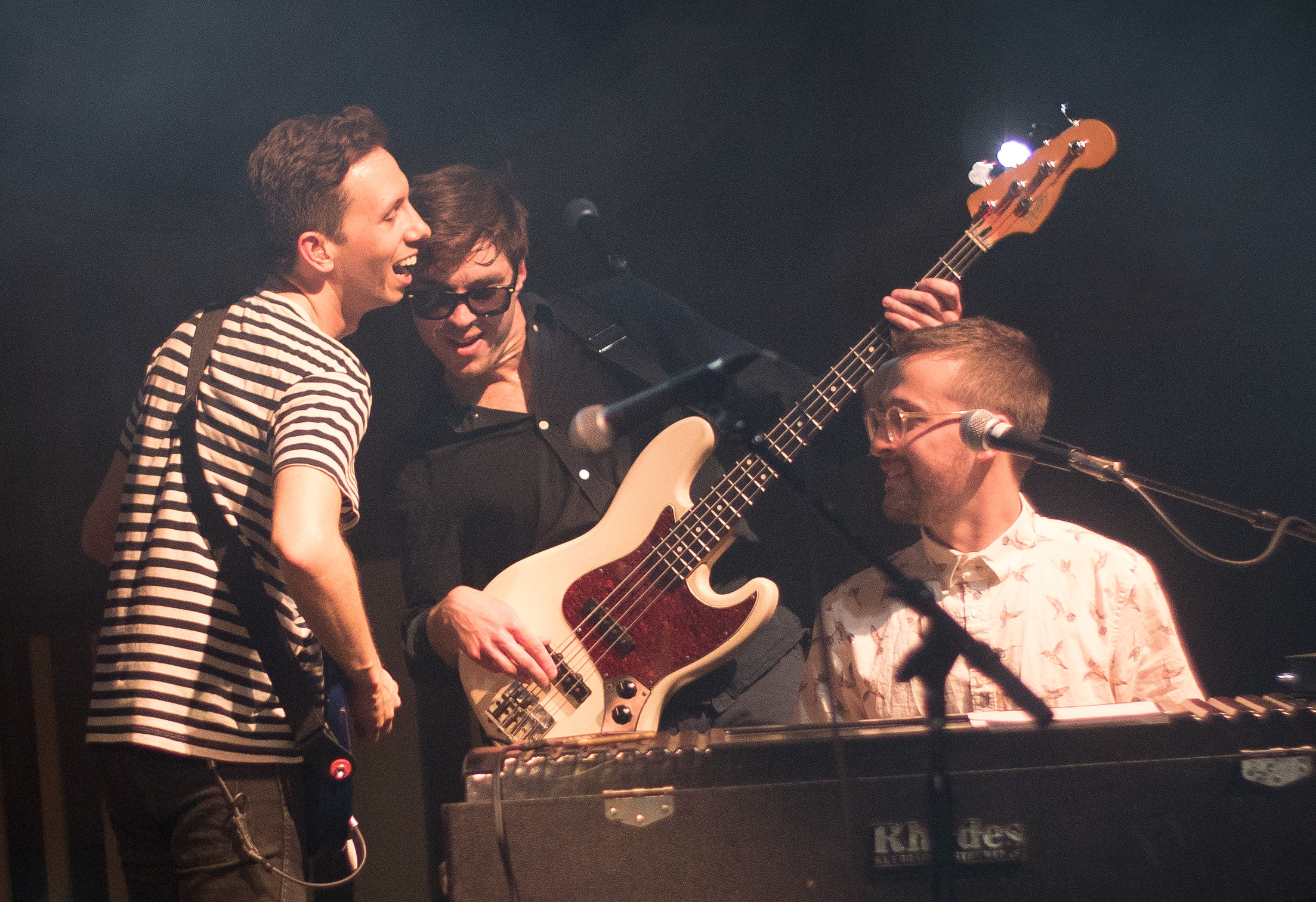
- Vulfpeck performing in Portland, Oregon, in 2017
- Studio albums: 6
- EPs: 4
- Live albums: 2
- Compilation albums: 6
- Video albums: 3
- Silent albums: 1

The discography of American funk group Vulfpeck currently consists of six studio albums, two live albums, four extended plays, six compilation albums, and one silent album. The band have released their music independently through their label Vulf Records since 2011.

From 2011 to 2014, the band released four extended plays consecutively and further released a Spotify-exclusive silent album titled Sleepify to exploit a loophole in the streaming services' distribution of royalties. Their debut studio album, Thrill of the Arts, was released in 2015 and debuted at number 16 on the Billboard R&B Albums chart. The Beautiful Game followed almost exactly a year later in 2016, and Mr Finish Line in 2017 – the latter notable for its prolific featured artist line-up. Following Hill Climber in 2018, the band headlined a sold-out concert at Madison Square Garden which was recorded and released as their first live album in December 2019. It was one of the first times that the venue had been sold out by an independent artist. The band's next album, The Joy of Music, the Job of Real Estate, was a compilation album consisting of four new and five previously released tracks (Note: Previously released tracks: "Bach Vision Test" (March 2020), "Poinciana" (first release 2015), "Eddie Buzzsaw" (2017), "Something" (2017), "Santa Baby" (2016)) as well as a track by the band Earthquake Lights, who won Vulfpeck's auction for the rights to track 10.

From 2020 to 2022, the band issued six albums under the Vulf Vault header with each album focusing on a different band member. The first four were vinyl-exclusive compilation albums. The latter two records uniquely contain all-new material and were not released under Vulfpeck, but rather under the respective band member's name. After a brief hiatus, the band released their fifth studio album, Schvitz, in 2022. The band's sixth album, Clarity of Cal, was recorded during live shows at the Palladium in Los Angeles and UC Theatre in Berkeley and released in 2025. The band's second live album, MSG II, was recorded in 2025 at Madison Square Garden.

The band has released three concert films in support of their albums: Vulfpeck Live at Madison Square Garden in 2019, Clarity of Cal (Live from the Palladium) and MSG II in 2025.

Vulfpeck founder Jack Stratton does most of the band's production work. Personnel credits (such as songwriting, session musicians, production and technical credits) of original songs are listed on official music video descriptions on Vulf Records YouTube channel.

Extended plays are listed first in order to maintain the chronological order.

== Extended plays ==
List of extended plays, with details
Title	Tracklist	Details
Mit Peck	No. / Title / Length; 1. / "Beastly" / 4:10; 2. / "It Gets Funkier" / 4:51; 3. / "Rango" / 4:29; 4. / "Cars Too" / 4:34; 5. / "Prom" / 4:00; 6. / "Tomboy" / 3:38	Released: December 21, 2011; Label: Vulf Records (VULF2011); Formats: Digital download, streaming, vinyl LP
Vollmilch	No. / Title / Length; 1. / "Outro" / 4:35; 2. / "A Walk to Remember" / 5:05; 3. / "Adrienne & Adrianne" / 3:46; 4. / "It Gets Funkier II" / 5:11; 5. / "Barbara" / 4:09; 6. / "Mean Girls" / 4:08	Released: December 20, 2012; Label: Vulf Records (VULF2012); Formats: Digital download, streaming, vinyl LP
My First Car	No. / Title / Length; 1. / "Wait for the Moment" (feat. Antwaun Stanley) / 3:50; 2. / "The Birdwatcher" / 2:35; 3. / "The Speedwalker" / 2:28; 4. / "My First Car" / 4:31; 5. / "Kuhmilch 74 BPM" / 2:11; 6. / "It Gets Funkier III" / 3:07	Released: December 6, 2013; Label: Vulf Records (VULF2013); Formats: Digital download, streaming, vinyl LP
Fugue State	No. / Title / Length; 1. / "Fugue State" / 2:41; 2. / "1612" (feat. Antwaun Stanley) / 3:19; 3. / "First Place" / 3:17; 4. / "Sky Mall" / 2:35; 5. / "Christmas in L.A. (Instrumental)" / 4:06; 6. / "Newsbeat" / 3:29	Released: August 26, 2014; Label: Vulf Records (VULF2014); Formats: Digital download, streaming, vinyl LP

== Albums ==
=== Studio albums ===
List of studio albums, with details
Title	Tracklist	Details
Thrill of the Arts	No. / Title / Length; 1. / "Welcome to Vulf Records" (feat. Joey Dosik) / 2:43; 2. / "Back Pocket" (feat. Theo Katzman, Christine Hucal, Mark Dover) / 3:01; 3. / "Funky Duck" (feat. Antwaun Stanley) / 2:10; 4. / "Rango II" (feat. Blake Mills) / 4:11; 5. / "Game Winner" (feat. Charles Jones and David T. Walker) / 3:32; 6. / "Walkies" / 1:03; 7. / "Christmas in L.A." (feat. Theo Katzman and David T. Walker) / 3:03; 8. / "Conscious Club (Instrumental)" / 3:03; 9. / "Smile Meditation" (feat. Tyler Duncan) / 4:29; 10. / "Guided Smile Meditation" / 5:09	Released: October 9, 2015; Label: Vulf Records (VULF2015); Formats: CD, digital download, streaming, vinyl LP
The Beautiful Game	No. / Title / Length; 1. / "The Sweet Science" (feat. Michael Winograd) / 1:55; 2. / "Animal Spirits" (feat. Theo Katzman and Christine Hucal) / 3:10; 3. / "Dean Town" / 3:33; 4. / "Conscious Club" (feat. Laura Mace) / 3:20; 5. / "El Chepe" (feat. Rich Hinman and Adam Levy) / 4:48; 6. / "1 for 1, DiMaggio" (feat. Antwaun Stanley) / 3:09; 7. / "Daddy, He Got a Tesla" (feat. Pegasus Warning, Joey Dosik, Jamire Williams) / 3:25; 8. / "Margery, My First Car" (feat. Christine Hucal) / 3:51; 9. / "Aunt Leslie" (feat. Antwaun Stanley, Bethanni Grecynski, Cory Wong) / 3:49; 10. / "Cory Wong" / 4:06	Released: October 17, 2016; Label: Vulf Records (VULF2016); Formats: CD, digital download, streaming, vinyl LP
Mr Finish Line	No. / Title / Length; 1. / "Birds of a Feather, We Rock Together" (feat. Antwaun Stanley) / 4:45; 2. / "Baby I Don't Know Oh Oh" (feat. Charles Jones) / 3:28; 3. / "Mr. Finish Line" (feat. Christine Hucal and Theo Katzman) / 3:13; 4. / "Tee Time" / 2:49; 5. / "Running Away" (feat. Joey Dosik, David T. Walker, James Gadson) / 4:32; 6. / "Hero Town" (feat. Michael Bland) / 3:35; 7. / "Business Casual" (feat. Coco O.) / 3:03; 8. / "Vulf Pack" / 2:37; 9. / "Grandma" (feat. Antwaun Stanley, David T. Walker, James Gadson) / 5:05; 10. / "Captain Hook" (feat. Bootsy Collins) / 2:40	Released: November 7, 2017; Label: Vulf Records (VULF2017); Formats: CD, digital download, streaming, vinyl LP
Hill Climber	No. / Title / Length; 1. / "Half of the Way" (feat. Theo Katzman) / 3:16; 2. / "Darwin Derby" (feat. Theo Katzman and Antwaun Stanley) / 3:15; 3. / "Lonely Town" (feat. Theo Katzman) / 2:54; 4. / "Love Is a Beautiful Thing" (feat. Theo Katzman and Monica Martin) / 3:53; 5. / "For Survival" (feat. Mike Viola) / 3:41; 6. / "Soft Parade" / 2:36; 7. / "Lost My Treble Long Ago" / 3:17; 8. / "Disco Ulysses (Instrumental)" / 3:51; 9. / "The Cup Stacker" / 3:41; 10. / "It Gets Funkier IV" (feat. Louis Cole) / 3:16	Released: December 7, 2018; Label: Vulf Records (VULF2018); Formats: CD, digital download, streaming, vinyl LP
Schvitz	No. / Title / Length; 1. / "Sauna" / 3:15; 2. / "Earworm" / 2:24; 3. / "New Guru" (feat. Antwaun Stanley) / 3:24; 4. / "All That's Left of Me Is You" (feat. Theo Katzman) / 2:52; 5. / "Simple Step" (feat. Antwaun Stanley) / 2:45; 6. / "In Heaven" (feat. Antwaun Stanley) / 3:36; 7. / "Serve Somebody" (feat. Antwaun Stanley) / 4:22; 8. / "Romanian Drinking Song" / 3:52; 9. / "What Did You Mean by Love?" (feat. Antwaun Stanley) / 4:33; 10. / "Miracle" / 3:24	Released: December 30, 2022; Label: Vulf Records (VULF2022); Formats: Digital download, streaming, vinyl LP
Clarity of Cal	No. / Title / Length; 1. / "Big Dipper" / 3:08; 2. / "Matter of Time" / 4:02; 3. / "Can You Tell" (feat. Joey Dosik) / 4:26; 4. / "In Real Life" / 2:57; 5. / "Tender Defender" (feat. Theo Katzman) / 4:23; 6. / "New Beastly" / 4:11; 7. / "La Gioconda" (feat. Antwaun Stanley and Jacob Jeffries) / 1:42; 8. / "The Heist" / 3:17; 9. / "Memories" / 4:35; 10. / "Aug 26" / 2:26; 11. / "This Is Not the Song I Wrote" (feat. Joey Dosik and Jacob Jeffries) / 3:22	Released: March 4, 2025; Label: Vulf Records (VULF2025); Formats: CD, digital download, streaming, vinyl LP

=== Live albums ===
List of live albums, with details
Title	Details	Peak chart positions
Title	Details	AUS
Live at Madison Square Garden	Released: December 9, 2019; Label: Vulf Records (VULF2019); Formats: Digital download, streaming, vinyl LP	—
MSG II	Released: December 12, 2025; Label: Vulf Records (VULF2025MSG); Formats: Digital download, streaming, vinyl LP	86

=== Compilation albums ===
List of compilation albums, with details
Title
Tracklist
Details
Vinyl Discography (2011–2014)
—
- Released: 2015
- Label: Vulf Records (VULF1201)
- Formats: CD, vinyl LP
The Joy of Music, the Job of Real Estate (Note: This album is categorized by the band as a compilation album. It consists of new as well as previously released songs.)

No.	Title	Artist	Length
1.	"Bach Vision Test"		2:29
2.	"3 on E" (feat. Antwaun Stanley)		2:57
3.	"Test Drive (Instrumental)"		2:57
4.	"Radio Shack"		3:16
5.	"LAX" (feat. Joey Dosik)		3:45
6.	"Poinciana"		2:23
7.	"Eddie Buzzsaw" (feat. Eddie Barbash)		2:25
8.	"Something" (feat. Bernard Purdie and Theo Katzman)		3:56
9.	"Santa Baby"		3:37
10.	"Off and Away"	Earthquake Lights	4:03

- Released: October 23, 2020
- Label: Vulf Records (VULF2020)
- Formats: Digital download, streaming, vinyl LP

=== Other releases ===
List of releases no longer in the Vulfpeck discography
Title	Details
Sleepify	Released: March 2014; Label: Vulf Records; Format: Streaming (Note: Also issued on 7-inch 45rpm vinyl in April 2017.)
Official Statement	Released: April 2014; Label: Vulf Records; Format: Streaming
Flow State (Note: Flow State was a three-track release on Spotify. Its title track "Flow State" was 31 seconds long and consisted of a low frequency inaudible tone (at the resonant frequency of planet Earth, around 8 Hertz). Part of the revenue generated from streaming the title track was to be distributed to audience members at a Vulfpeck show.)	Released: April 2016; Label: Vulf Records; Format: Streaming

== Vulf Vault side project ==
=== Vulf Vault compilation albums ===
List of compilation albums, with details
Title	Tracklist	Details
Vulf Vault 001: Antwaun Stanley	No. / Title / Length; 1. / "Wait For The Moment" / 3:50; 2. / "1612" / 3:19; 3. / "3 on E" / 2:57; 4. / "Birds Of A Feather, We Rock Together" / 4:45; 5. / "Funky Duck" / 2:10; 6. / "1 For 1, DiMaggio" / 3:09; 7. / "Grandma" / 5:05	Released: 2020; Label: Vulf Records (VV001); Format: Vinyl LP
Vulf Vault 002: Inside the Mind of Woody Goss	No. / Title / Length; 1. / "Dean Town" / 3:33; 2. / "Fugue State" / 2:41; 3. / "Radio Shack" / 3:16; 4. / "Smile Meditation" / 4:29; 5. / "Santa Baby" / 3:37; 6. / "Newsbeat" / 3:29; 7. / "Tee Time" / 2:49; 8. / "My First Car" / 4:31; 9. / "The Birdwatcher" / 2:35; 10. / "Mean Girls" / 4:08; 11. / "A Walk To Remember" / 5:05	Released: 2020; Label: Vulf Records (VV002); Format: Vinyl LP
Vulf Vault 003: Theo!	No. / Title / Length; 1. / "Back Pocket" / 3:01; 2. / "Animal Spirits" / 3:10; 3. / "Darwin Derby" / 3:15; 4. / "Love Is A Beautiful Thing" / 3:53; 5. / "Half Of The Way" / 3:16; 6. / "Lonely Town" / 2:54; 7. / "Christmas In L.A." / 3:03; 8. / "Mr. Finish Line" / 3:13; 9. / "Cars Too" / 4:34; 10. / "Captain Hook" / 2:40; 11. / "Hey Bobo" / 2:46	Released: 2021; Label: Vulf Records (VV003); Format: Vinyl LP
Vulf Vault 004: Dart	No. / Title / Length; 1. / "Beastly" / 4:10; 2. / "Dean Town" / 3:33; 3. / "Disco Ulysses" / 3:51; 4. / "Lost My Treble Long Ago" / 3:17; 5. / "IGF I" / 4:51; 6. / "My First Car" / 4:31; 7. / "Sky Mall" / 2:35; 8. / "Conscious Club (Instrumental)" / 3:03; 9. / "3 on E (Instrumental)" / 2:58; 10. / "Tesla (Red Rocks)" / 3:26	Released: 2021; Label: Vulf Records (VV004); Format: Vinyl LP

=== Vulf Vault original recordings ===
List of Vulf Vault original albums, with details
Title
Tracklist
Details
Vulf Vault 005: Wong's Cafe

No.	Title	Length
1.	"Smokeshow"	4:02
2.	"Disco de Lune"	4:05
3.	"You Got to Be You (Instrumental)"	3:47
4.	"Let's Go! (Instrumental)"	4:30
5.	"Memories"	1:15
6.	"Sweet Potato Pie"	2:59
7.	"Radio Shack (Wong's Cafe Version)"	3:15
8.	"Out in the Sun" (feat. Eddie Barbash)	2:58
9.	"Guitar Music"	1:11
10.	"Kitchen Etude"	0:51

- Released: January 7, 2022
- Primary artist: Cory Wong
- Label: Vulf Records (VV005)
- Formats: Digital download, streaming, vinyl LP
Vulf Vault 006: Here We Go Jack

No.	Title	Length
1.	"How Much Do You Love Me?" (feat. Jacob Jeffries)	3:44
2.	"Boogie Man (Note: Original by Jimmy Bryant and Speedy West circa 1975. (Source: For the Last Time at AllMusic))" (feat. Mason Stoops, Tyler Nuffer)	2:41
3.	"Alone Again, Naturally" (feat. Monica Martin)	3:31
4.	"Contrapunctus I" (feat. Michael Winograd)	3:17
5.	"Take Me to a Higher Place"	3:19
6.	"Never Can Say Goodbye" (feat. David T. Walker, Solomon Dorsey)	3:42
7.	"Let's Go! Let's Go!" (feat. Mike Viola)	4:42
8.	"Bach Pedal" (feat. Rich Hinman)	0:40
9.	"Here We Go Jack"	3:58
10.	"Rutgers"	2:19

- Released: August 5, 2022
- Primary artist: Vulfmon
- Label: Vulf Records (VV006)
- Formats: Digital download, streaming, vinyl LP

== Videography ==
=== Concert films ===
List of concert films published by Vulf Records
Title	Details	Location
Vulfpeck Live at Madison Square Garden	Released: December 9, 2019; Running time: 103 minutes; Format: Streaming	Madison Square Garden New York City
Clarity of Cal (Live from the Palladium)	Released: March 4, 2025; Running time: 45 minutes; Format: Streaming	Hollywood Palladium Los Angeles; UC Theatre Berkeley, California
MSG II	Released: December 11, 2025; Running time: 108 minutes; Format: Streaming	Madison Square Garden New York City

=== Concert videos ===
List of concert videos published by Vulf Records
Title	Details	Location
Vulfpeck Live at Bonnaroo	Released: June 27, 2023; Running time: 75 minutes; Format: Streaming	Bonnaroo Manchester, Tennessee
Vulfpeck Live in France	Released: August 5, 2024; Running time: 108 minutes; Format: Streaming	Jazz à Vienne Vienne, France
Vulfpeck Live at Red Rocks	Released: April 1, 2026; Running time: 98 minutes; Format: Streaming	Red Rocks Morrison, Colorado
Vulfpeck Live at The Greek	Released: November 13, 2026; Running time: 81 minutes; Format: Streaming	Greek Theatre, UC Berkeley, California; Greek Theatre, LA Los Angeles
