= Jeremy Kittel =

American musician (born 1984)

- Born: Jeremy David Kittel; April 26, 1984 (age 42)
- Origin: Michigan, United States
- Genres: acoustic, Classical, Celtic, bluegrass, folk, jazz
- Occupations: Composer, Arranger, Producer, Violinist, Fiddler, Violist, Multi-instrumentalist
- Instruments: Violin, viola, vocals, guitar, mandolin, piano
- Years active: 2000-present
- Website: JeremyKittel.com

Jeremy Kittel is an American musician and composer. His primary instruments are the violin / fiddle and viola and he has worked in a number of genres including Celtic, Jazz, Pop, Classical, Bluegrass, Folk music, and more.

He leads his namesake group, Kittel & Co. and has worked with many prominent artists, including Tally Hall, Sabrina Carpenter, Béla Fleck, Abigail Washburn, Zedd, Fleet Foxes, Edgar Meyer, Chris Thile, Shawn Mendes, My Morning Jacket, Yo-Yo Ma, the Silk Road Ensemble, Paquito D’Rivera, Mark O'Connor, Turtle Island Quartet, Jon Batiste, Aoife O'Donovan, Jars of Clay, and Darol Anger.

== Biography ==
Kittel grew up in Saline, Michigan. He attended the University of Michigan School of Music, Theatre & Dance for his undergraduate degree and earned his master's degree in jazz violin from the Manhattan School of Music in 2007.

Jeremy Kittel has performed as a soloist with many orchestras including the Detroit Symphony, Vancouver Symphony, Louisville Orchestra, Rochester Philharmonic and Orlando Philharmonic. He was a guest on A Prairie Home Companion twice and has played in the house band for Live From Here and Late Night with Stephen Colbert. He has also played the Kennedy Center, Bonnaroo, Telluride Bluegrass Festival, and Carnegie Hall.

'Chrysalis,' a track on his group's 2018 album Whorls, was nominated for a Grammy for Best Instrumental Composition; the other nominees were John Williams, Alan Silvestri, Terence Blanchard, and Alexandre Desplat. He has won other awards throughout his career, some of the more notable being the Daniel Pearl Memorial Violin; the Stanley Medal and Emerging Artist Award at the University of Michigan; the Detroit Music Award for Outstanding Folk Artist, Outstanding Jazz Recording and Outstanding Jazz composer; and the U.S. National Scottish Fiddle Championship.

In 2015, Kittel co-composed the symphonic work Bull Frogs Croon with Aoife O'Donovan and Teddy Abrams, and it was performed by him and O'Donovan as soloists. In 2016, the Konzerthaus Berlin commissioned him to compose a piece for the 100th birthday of Yehudi Menuhin. The work, "A Compass in the Tempest," was premiered with violinists Daniel Hope, Roby Lakatos, L. Subramaniam, Gilles Apap, Didier Lockwood and Mark O’Connor. In 2020, alongside the Orlando Philharmonic Orchestra and Eric Jacobsen he premiered a newly commissioned piece, Stones River, drawing upon early American music. And in 2022, he premiered In the Dream, for Symphonic Band and solo violin, commissioned by the University of Michigan, at Hill Auditorium in Ann Arbor, MI.

As an arranger, he has worked with Aoife O'Donovan, Zedd, Sara Watkins, Shawn Mendes, Abigail Washburn, Theo Katzman, Yo-Yo Ma, the Silk Road Ensemble, Renee Fleming, the Turtle Island Quartet, Laura Veirs, Chris Thile, My Morning Jacket, John Mayer, Jars of Clay, Camera Obscura, and more.

== Discography ==
=== Solo recordings ===
Year	Album
2018	Whorls [Kittel & Co.]
2010	Chasing Sparks
2005	Jazz Violin
2003	Roaming
2000	Celtic Fiddle

=== Other Recordings, etc. ===
Year	Title	Medium	Credit
2024	Shawn (Shawn Mendes)	Album	String Arranger, Violin, Viola
2024	Telos (Zedd)	Album	String & Orchestral Arranger, Violin, Viola
2023	The Way Things Used to Be (Zac Zinger)	Album	Featured soloist
2022	The Bridge (Jazz Mafia, Otis McDonald, Adam Theis)	Single	Violin solo [recorded in 2012]
2022	Infinite Space (SÍOMHA)	Album	Strings Arranger, Violin, Viola
2021	Ascension (Antwaun Stanley and Tyler Duncan)	Album	Violin, Viola
2021	Ultramodern (Ruen Brothers)	Album	Violin, Viola
2021	Pin-Up Daddy (Rett Madison)	Album	Violin, Viola
2020	Wendy (Film, Searchlight Pictures)	Film	Viola
2020	Bull Frogs Croon (and Other Songs) (Aoife O'Donovan)	Album	Producer, Arranger, Co-composer, Performer
2020	Modern Johnny Sings: Songs in the Age of Vibe (Theo Katzman)	Album	Strings Arranger, Violin, Viola
2020	Perfect Song (Sabrina Carpenter)	Single	Violin, Viola
2020	Joel Adams (Joel Adams)	Album	Violin, Viola
2019	WWE 2K20 (2K Games)	Video Game	Violin, Viola
2019	Noisy Feelings (Ryan Lerman)	Album	Violin, Viola
2019	Borderless Lullabies (Esperanza Spalding, Morley, others)	Album	Violin, Viola
2018	What They Had (Original Motion Picture Soundtrack)	Album	Violin, Viola, Improvisations
2017	Mother Lion (May Erlewine)	Album	Violin
2017	A Series of Unfortunate Events (The Ersatz Elevator: Part One)	TV	Violin
2017	Crack-Up (Fleet Foxes)	Album	Violin
2016	Sing Me Home (Yo-Yo Ma and The Silk Road Ensemble)	Album	Arranger, "Going Home" feat. Abigail Washburn
2016	The Raven's Rock (Cillian Vallely)	Album	Fiddle
2014	Notify (Padraig Rynne)	Album	Violin, Viola
2013	Mike Marshall and the Turtle Island Quartet (Turtle Island Quartet, Mike Marshall)	Album	Viola
2013	Dot the Dragon's Eyes (Hanneke Cassel)	Album	Fiddle, Viola
2013	Go Down Singing (single, Michelle Chamuel)	Album	Violin, Viola
2013	Desire Lines (Camera Obscura)	Album	Strings Arranger, Violin, Viola
2013	Fossils (Aoife O'Donovan)	Album	Strings Arranger, Violin, Viola
2013	Inland (Jars of Clay)	Album	Strings Arranger, Violin, Viola
2013	Warp and Weft (Laura Veirs)	Album	Strings Arranger, Violin, Viola
2013	Starcraft II: Heart of the Swarm	Video Game	Violin, Viola
2012	Half-Made Man (Ben Sollee)	Album	Violin, Viola, Fiddle
2012	Epic Mickey 2	Video Game	Violin, Viola
2011	Circuital (My Morning Jacket)	Album	Strings Arranger, Violin, Viola
2011	Send It Down (Kai Welch)	Album	Strings Arranger, Violin, Viola
2011	Kinect: Disneyland Adventures	Video Game	Violin, Viola
2011	Infamous 2	Video Game	Violin, Viola
2010	Have You Ever Been (Turtle Island Quartet)	Album	Viola, Arranger
2010	City of Refuge (Abigail Washburn)	Album	Strings Arranger, Violin, Viola
2010	Istiqbal Gathering (John Jorgensen and Orchestra Nashville)	Album	Viola (in Turtle Island Quartet)
2008	This Here (Seth Bernard)	Album	Violin, Fiddle
2007	No Regrets (John Nam)	Album	Violin
2006	Fiddle Camp (Mark O'Connor and Guests)	Album	Violin, Fiddle
2006	Gypsy Djazz (The Detroit Swingtet)	Album	Violin
2005	Cinnamon Matinee (Ben Cyllus)	Album	Violin
2006	Gypsy Djazz (The Detroit Swingtet)	Album	Violin
2005	Marvin's Marvelous Mechanical Museum (Tally Hall)	Album	Violin
2004	Songs of Innocence and Experience (William Bolcom)	Album	Violin
