= Romance Without Finance =

Studio album by Theo Katzman
- Released: November 15, 2011
- Recorded: 2010–2011
- Genre: Indie rock, folk rock
- Length: 37:50
- Label: Independent
- Producer: Theo Katzman, Devin Kerr

Theo Katzman chronology
| Solo Acoustic EP (2010) | Romance Without Finance (2011) | Heartbreak Hits (2017) |

Romance Without Finance is the first studio album by singer-songwriter Theo Katzman. It was released on November 15, 2011. The album's sound draws from Katzman's influences which include rock, soul, folk and pop. Katzman is the composer and performs on several instruments. Music videos of two tracks, "Hard For You" and "Brooklyn", were released in 2012. The name of the album is derived from an old jazz song by Tiny Grimes, the full phrase being "romance without finance is a nuisance". The album debuted at #5 on the iTunes Singer-Songwriter albums chart.

== Track listing ==
| No. | Title | Length |
|---|---|---|
| 1. | "Every Few Days" | 4:36 |
| 2. | "Called To Tell You" | 3:21 |
| 3. | "Hard For You" | 4:32 |
| 4. | "White Picket Castle" | 5:42 |
| 5. | "You Could Never Know" | 2:28 |
| 6. | "Growing, Growing, Gone" | 4:47 |
| 7. | "Brooklyn" | 2:51 |
| 8. | "Country Backroads" | 4:37 |
| 9. | "I Feel Love (All The Time)" | 4:56 |

== Personnel ==
Credits adapted from Bandcamp music store.

- Theo Katzman – writer, performer, engineer, producer, vocals
- Devin Kerr – engineer, mixing, mastering, producer, percussion, backing vocals (track 2), rhodes (track 4), piano (track 8)
- Lee Katzman – lyrics (track 6)
- Joe Dart – fender bass (tracks 2, 8, 9)
- Woody Goss – rhodes (tracks 4, 8)
- Joey Dosik – piano (tracks 4, 7), mellotron (track 9)
- The West Deuce Kitchen Choir – Tyler Duncan, Jae Gerhart, Mike Shea, Hannah Winkler, Julian Allen (tracks 7, 9)
- Good Hertz Studio – recording
- Tyler Duncan – additional mixing
- Annlie Huang – assistant engineer
- Ron Torella – piano technician
- Christine Hucal – photography
- Jack Stratton – graphic design
