= Vulfpeck =

American funk-soul band

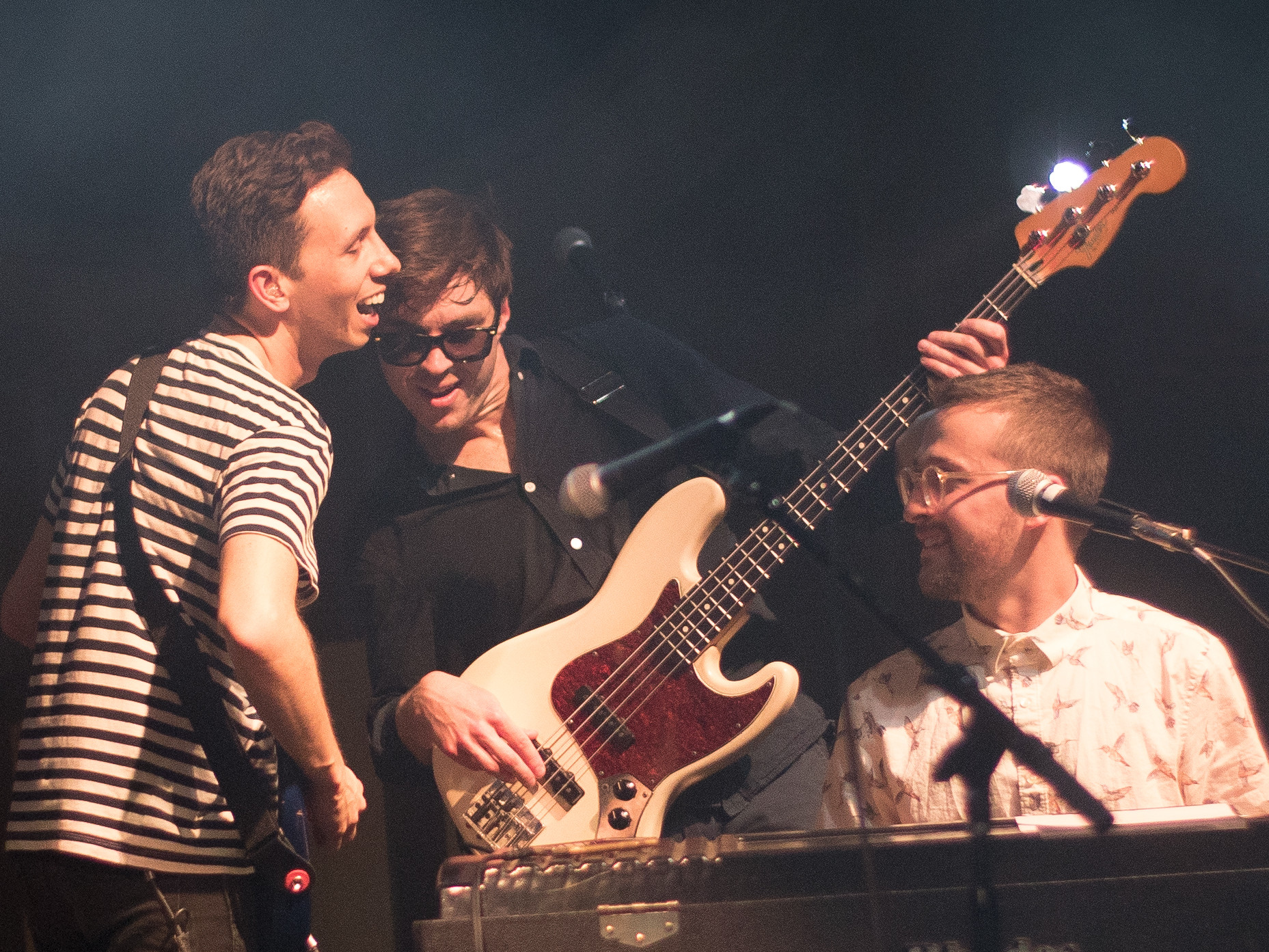
- Vulfpeck performing in Portland, Oregon with Cory Wong (left), 2017

Background information
- Origin: Ann Arbor, Michigan, U.S.
- Genres: Funk; soul; jazz pop
- Works: Discography
- Years active: 2011–present
- Label: Vulf Records
- Spinoffs: The Fearless Flyers
- Members: Jack Stratton; Theo Katzman; Woody Goss; Joe Dart; (see § Members for others)
- Website: vulfpeck.com

Vulfpeck is an American funk-soul band and musical collective formed in Ann Arbor, Michigan in 2011. The band has released six studio albums, four extended plays, and two live albums through their own record label. The band gained recognition in 2014 for releasing Sleepify, a silent album that exposed a loophole in Spotify's royalty distribution and funded an admission-free tour. The band was one of the first to sell out Madison Square Garden without a manager or backing label, and released the recorded performance as a live album in 2019. The band's most recent album, MSG II, was released in December 2025.

Founded by bandleader and multi-instrumentalist Jack Stratton, the band consists of core members Theo Katzman, Woody Goss, and Joe Dart, musical partners Cory Wong, Antwaun Stanley, Joey Dosik, Jacob Jeffries, Charles Jones, and Louis Cato, and a changing lineup of guest musicians.

== Background ==
The band members attended the University of Michigan School of Music. They first came together (Note: Antwaun Stanley, Joe Dart and Jack Stratton were previously part of a band called Groove Spoon.) for a recording session (Note: The session involved recording their original music on 2-inch tape as part of a friend's senior thesis project.) at the Duderstadt Center, a university facility that houses an arts library and other resources. After reading an interview with German producer Reinhold Mack, band founder Jack Stratton conceived of Vulfpeck as an imagined German version of the U.S. session musicians of the 1960s such as the Funk Brothers, the Wrecking Crew, and the Swampers. The idea was to channel the live rhythm sections of that era.

The band started recording in 2011 with Jack Stratton on drums and keyboards, Theo Katzman on guitar and drums, Woody Goss on keyboards, and Joe Dart on bass. Musical partners joined in later years starting in 2016. These include Antwaun Stanley, Joey Dosik, Cory Wong, Jacob Jeffries, Charles Jones, and Louis Cato. Guest musicians who have contributed to the band's studio albums and live performances include Christine Hucal, Richie Rodriguez, David T. Walker, Bernard Purdie, James Gadson, Blake Mills, and others.

== History ==
=== 2011–2014: EPs and Sleepify ===
The band's first release was titled "Beastly". It was released in April 2011 as a YouTube video. The track was noted by No Treble, an online magazine for bass players, for its bass performance. The band released its first EP, Mit Peck, in 2011 and a second EP, Vollmilch, in 2012. In 2013, three band members backed Darren Criss on his national tour, and Joe Dart was ranked as No Treble's 5th-favorite bassist. Vulfpeck's first live performance was at the Blind Pig in Ann Arbor, Michigan, followed by a performance in New York City at the Rockwood Music Hall in October 2013. The band released its third EP, My First Car, in August 2013. The EP features Antwaun Stanley on the band's first vocal track. A review of My First Car called it less energetic compared to the band's first two EPs but "still a fitting addition to a unique catalogue of music".

In March 2014, Vulfpeck released Sleepify, a ten-track silent album on Spotify, in order to raise funds for an admission-free tour. The album generated $20,000 in royalties over a two-month period. Subsequently, Spotify removed the album stating it violated their terms of content. The band's royalty generation scheme received international press coverage. In July the band received the royalties and soon after announced the Sleepify Tour.

In August 2014, the band released its fourth EP, Fugue State. The EP's second track "1612" is styled after Wardell Quezergue's works and features Antwaun Stanley on vocals. (Note: The song's title was inspired by the entrance code to an Airbnb Stratton was subletting.) The admission-free Sleepify Tour took place in September 2014. Tour locations included San Francisco, Los Angeles, Chicago, Ann Arbor and New York City. In 2015, Stratton proposed a more equitable model for Spotify payout distribution in which each artist's payout is based solely on that artist's listeners, rather than every listener using the service.

=== 2015–2019: Studio albums and Live at Madison Square Garden ===
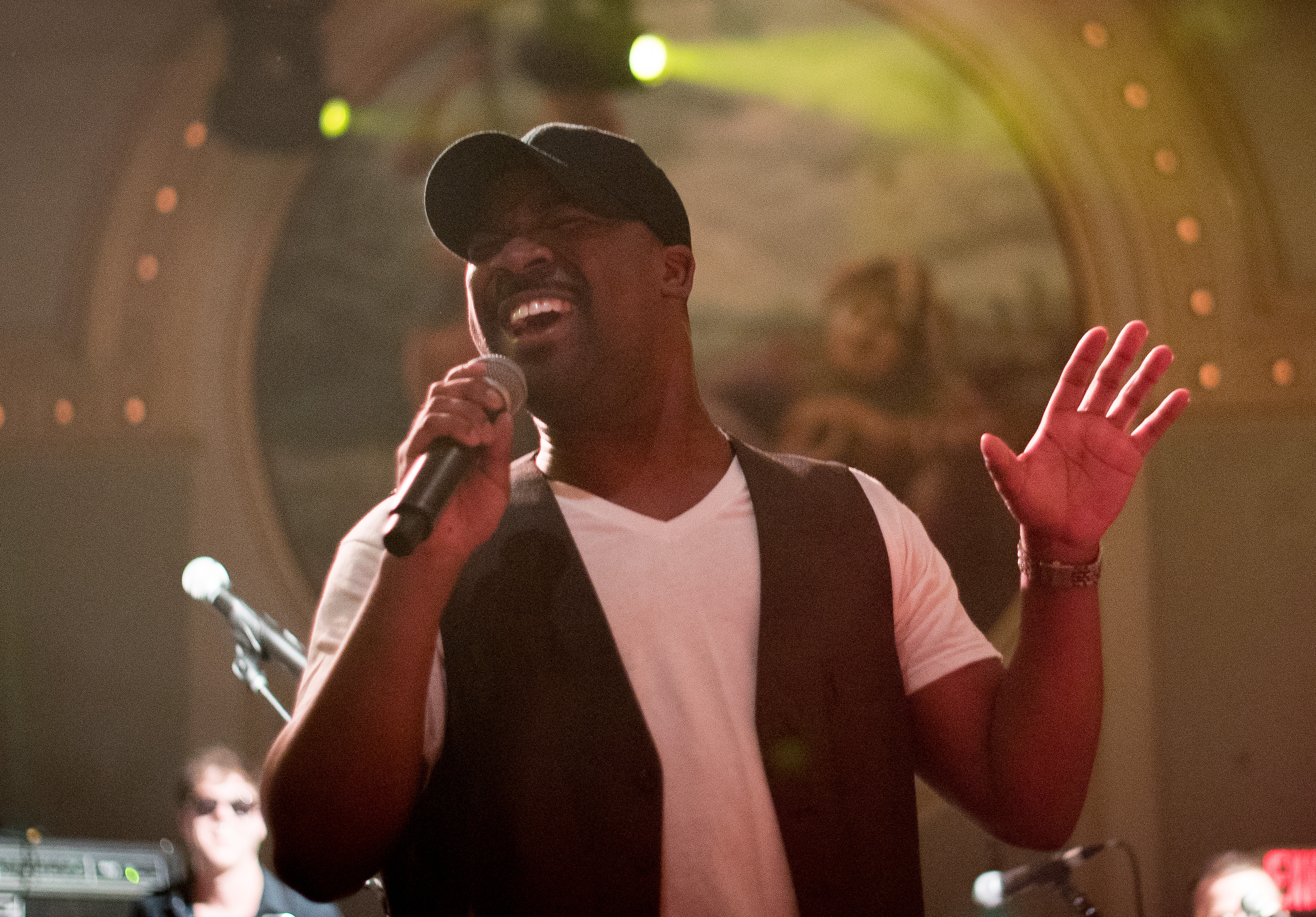
Antwaun Stanley performing with Vulfpeck, 2017

Vulfpeck released Thrill of the Arts in October 2015. The album featured contributions by several artists including David T. Walker, Charles Jones and Blake Mills. Jim Fusilli of The Wall Street Journal called the music "gritty, in-your-face, not-prettified funk played with fire" and a homage to old-school funk and soul. The album debuted at number 16 on the U.S. R&B Albums chart. The band and Goodhertz Inc. released a production plug-in called Vulf Compressor. The band performed on The Late Show with Stephen Colbert in November 2015.

Vulfpeck's second album The Beautiful Game was released in October 2016. It featured contributions by several artists including Cory Wong and Adam Levy. This album includes the song, "Dean Town", which is based on and inspired by Weather Report's 1977 song, "Teen Town", especially the electric bass guitar line by Jaco Pastorius as interpreted by Joe Dart. The album peaked at number 10 on the Top R&B/Hip-Hop Albums chart. The band's third album, Mr Finish Line, was released in November 2017. It featured veteran instrumentalists James Gadson, Bootsy Collins, Michael Bland, David T. Walker, and vocalists Coco O., Antwaun Stanley, Joey Dosik, Christine Hucal, and Charles Jones. In 2016 and 2017 the band performed regularly with Antwaun Stanley and guest artists including several shows with Bernard Purdie and Ziggy Modeliste. The band performed a cover of "Boogie On Reggae Woman" on SiriusXM radio.

Vulfpeck's fourth album, Hill Climber, was released in December 2018 and featured Cory Wong, Joey Dosik, Antwaun Stanley, Ryan Lerman, Larry Goldings, Mike Viola, Monica Martin, and Louis Cole. In 2019, the Music Man guitar company introduced the Joe Dart Bass signature guitar, and subsequently the Joe Dart Jr., Joe Dart II and Joe Dart III bass guitars. Dart was ranked first by Bass Guitar magazine as the coolest new bassist.

In September 2019, the band headlined a sold-out concert at Madison Square Garden, one of the first to do so without a manager or record label. Recording of the performance was released as a live album, titled Live at Madison Square Garden, along with a full concert film. The live performance featured touring partners Stanley, Wong, Dosik, and guest artists Charles Jones, Chris Thile, Dave Koz, Nate Smith, Mark Dover, Richie Rodriguez and others.

=== 2020–present: Schvitz, Clarity of Cal and MSG II ===
In October 2020, the band released a compilation album (Note: This album is categorized by the band as a compilation album. It consists of new as well as previously released songs.) of new as well as previously released songs titled The Joy of Music, the Job of Real Estate. The album's tenth track is a song by the New York-based band Earthquake Lights who won an auction to publish on the album.

In 2022, Vulfpeck announced their return to music (post coronavirus pandemic) by revealing their fifth album Schvitz, which was released in December 2022. In an album review, Hunter-Tilney of Financial Times called the music "retro-funk and soul" and wrote the band "aims to put a smile on the listener's face". The band resumed touring in 2023 with shows in the U.S. and Europe, including Bonnaroo in 2023 and Jazz à Vienne in 2024. In September 2024, Vulfpeck played six shows at the UC Theatre in Berkeley and two shows at the Palladium in Los Angeles. During these shows, the band recorded their sixth album titled Clarity of Cal. (Note: The album's name comes from the Jack Kerouac poem October in the Railroad Earth.) The performances included Charles Jones on keyboards and Jacob Jeffries on vocals and percussion. The album, along with its accompanying concert film, was released in March 2025.

In 2025, the band performed its first show in Japan at the Fuji Rock Festival. The band also headlined its second concert at the Madison Square Garden which featured guest performances by veteran drummer Bernard Purdie and singer-songwriter Evangeline. Recording of the performance was released as the band's second live album, titled MSG II, along with an accompanying concert film. In 2026, Louis Cato substituted for Theo Katzman who stepped away from touring with the band in order to focus on his solo music. Cato and Charles Jones accompanied the band on its European and U.S. tour in 2026 and recorded on the band's upcoming album Decay of the Aura.

== Style ==
"Beastly" (2011)
Noted for its bass solo, the song became an impetus for the band's subsequent recording career.

"1612" (2014)
Reminiscent of funk-pioneers The Meters, the song is styled after the works of arranger Wardell Quezergue.

"Running Away" (2017)
A soul ballad by Joey Dosik, the recording features veteran instrumentalists James Gadson and David T. Walker.

The band's production style is modeled after live TV performances of the past, such as The Midnight Special, The Old Grey Whistle Test, and Beat-Club. The band aims for a simple and minimal sound where each instrument contributes and does not dominate. Recordings are done live with real instruments, and seldom are different takes cut and mixed. Improvisation is a significant part of song development. The compositions emphasize groove over melody and are modeled after unconventional songs, such as "Ooh Child" with an A and B section where each section provides a lift, and "If You Want Me to Stay" with a repetitive eight bar progression.

== Side projects ==
=== The Fearless Flyers ===
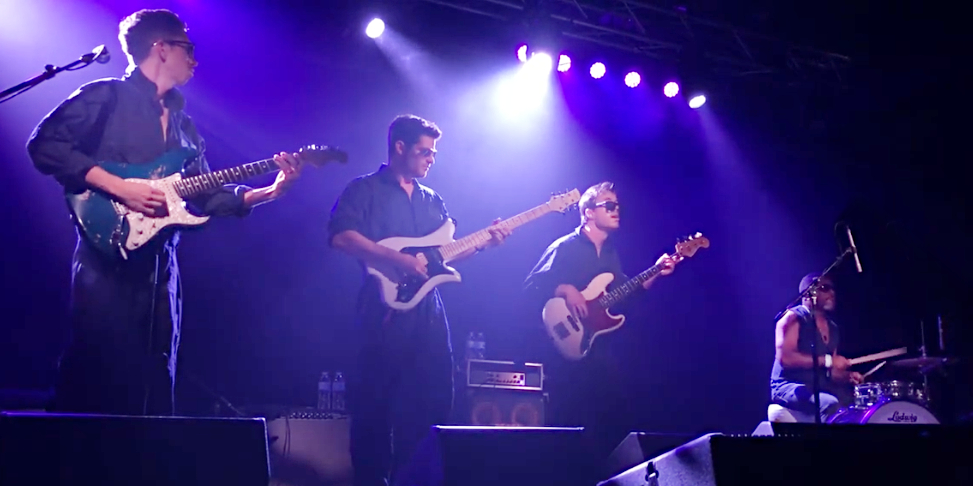
The Fearless Flyers, left to right: Wong, Lettieri, Dart, Smith

The Fearless Flyers are an instrumental quartet consisting of drummer Nate Smith, bassist Joe Dart, and guitarists Cory Wong and Mark Lettieri. The band was formed in 2018 by Vulfpeck founder Jack Stratton who produced the band's music through 2024. The band has released two studio albums, four extended plays, two live albums, and has toured in the United States and Europe. Collaborators who have recorded with the band include Sandra Crouch, Blake Mills, Elizabeth Lea, Chris Thile, Joey Dosik, Grace Kelly, Kenni Holmen and Alekos Syropoulos. The band's most recent album titled The Fearless Flyers V was released in 2025.

=== Christmas album ===
In 2019, band keyboardist Woody Goss released an album titled A Very Vulfy Christmas, a compilation of eight jazz-style rearrangements of Vulfpeck originals. The tracks feature drummer Dana Hall and bassists Matt Ulery and Joe Fee.

=== Vulf Vault ===
In 2020, Vulf Records started issuing vinyl-exclusive compilation albums under the Vulf Vault heading. The first was an album of eight songs featuring Antwaun Stanley followed by an album of eleven songs written by Woody Goss. Compilation albums highlighting the works of Katzman and Dart were issued in 2021. In 2022 Vulf Records released an album of original recordings titled Vulf Vault 005: Wong's Cafe. Highlighting the works of Cory Wong and produced by him, the album included contributions by Eddie Barbash. Later in 2022 the label released an album of new recordings by Vulfmon (Jack Stratton's solo alias) titled Vulf Vault 006: Here We Go Jack. The album included contributions by David T. Walker, Monica Martin, Mike Viola and others.

== Members ==
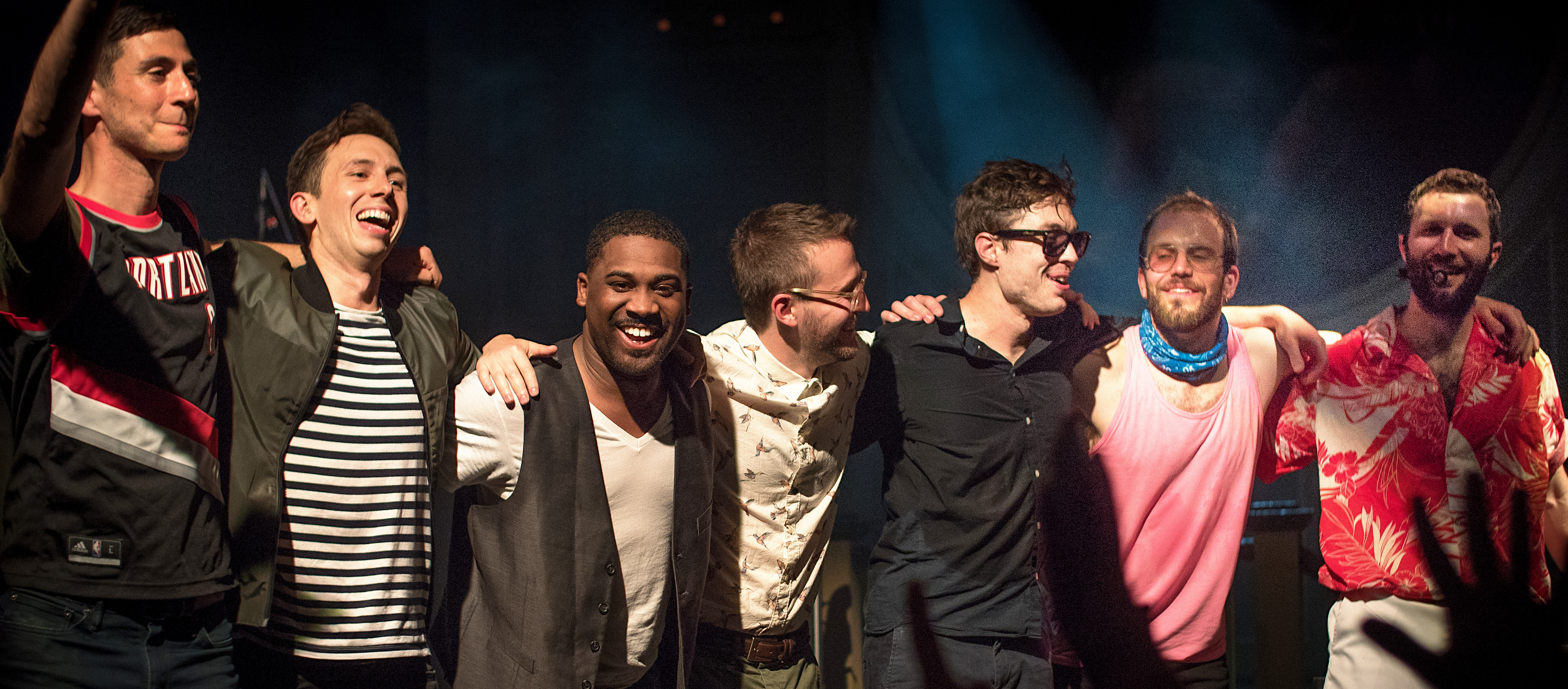
Left to right: Dosik, Wong, Stanley, Goss, Dart, Katzman, Stratton, in 2017

Founding members

- Joe Dart – bass (2011–present)
- Woody Goss – keyboards (2011–present)
- Theo Katzman – drums, guitar, percussion, keyboards, vocals (2011–present; hiatus 2026)
- Jack Stratton – drums, keyboards, guitar, percussion (2011–present)

Musical partners

- Joey Dosik – alto saxophone, keyboards, vocals (2016–present) (Note: Collaborator on select tracks prior to 2016)
- Antwaun Stanley – vocals (2016–present)
- Cory Wong – guitar (2016–present) (Note: Serves as the band's musical director from 2024 onwards)
- Jacob Jeffries – percussion, keyboards, vocals (2023–present)
- Charles Jones – keyboards, vocals (2024–present) (Note: Collaborator on select tracks prior to 2024)
- Louis Cato – drums, guitar, vocals (2026–present)

== Tours ==
- Sleepify Tour (2014)
- Spring Tour (2015)
- Wisdom of Crowds Tour (2017, 2018, 2019)
- Europe Summer Tour (2024, 2026)

== Discography ==
- Mit Peck (2011) (Note: Extended play)
- Vollmilch (2012)
- My First Car (2013)
- Fugue State (2014)
- Thrill of the Arts (2015)
- The Beautiful Game (2016)
- Mr Finish Line (2017)
- Hill Climber (2018)
- Schvitz (2022)
- Clarity of Cal (2025)

Live albums

- Live at Madison Square Garden (2019)
- MSG II (2025)

== Filmography ==
- Vulfpeck Live at Madison Square Garden (2019)
- Clarity of Cal (Live from the Palladium) (2025)
- MSG II (2025)
