= Theo Katzman =

American multi-instrumentalist (born 1986)

Background information
- Born: April 2, 1986 (age 40); New York City, U.S.
- Genres: Indie rock; folk rock; pop; soul; funk
- Occupations: Multi-instrumentalist; singer; songwriter; record producer
- Instruments: Vocals; guitar; drums; bass; piano; conga
- Years active: 2005–present
- Labels: Independent, Ten Good Songs
- Member of: Vulfpeck
- Formerly of: Ella Riot, Toolbox
- Website: theokatzman.com

Theodore Katzman (born April 2, 1986) is an American multi-instrumentalist, singer, songwriter, and record producer. He is best known as a founding member and multi-instrumentalist of the funk band Vulfpeck and for his work as a solo artist. His musical style is a fusion of pop, jazz, funk, and indie rock. He founded the independent record label Ten Good Songs. He has recorded with and contributed to the works of several artists including Michelle Chamuel, Tyler Duncan, May Erlewine, Teddy Geiger, Benjamin Jaffe, Jacob Jeffries, Rett Madison, and Antwaun Stanley. Katzman has released four studio albums, with his latest Be the Wheel released in March 2023.

== Early life and education ==
Katzman grew up in a musical family in Manhasset, New York. He attended Manhasset High School. His father, Lee Katzman, was a jazz trumpet player and would take him to rehearsals at an early age. When he was about twelve he started playing drums, guitar, and writing songs. In 2004, Katzman moved to Ann Arbor, Michigan and studied jazz at the University of Michigan.

== Career ==
In 2005, he joined the instrumental group Toolbox which evolved into the band Ella Riot. Katzman toured with the band from 2007 to 2010. During that time the band released an EP titled My Dear Disco and an album titled Dancethink.

In early 2010, Katzman pursued a solo career to focus on his singing and songwriting. He formed the trio Love Massive, who performed regularly and opened at the Ann Arbor Folk Festival in 2011. Katzman released an EP titled Solo Acoustic in 2010 and released his first studio album Romance Without Finance in 2011. In late 2011, he moved to Brooklyn and released music videos for two of his songs, "Hard For You" and "Brooklyn". In 2012, he opened for several artists including Vanessa Carlton, Matisyahu, and Vienna Teng. In 2013, he was the musical director and the opening act for Darren Criss on his national tour, Listen Up, and released a single titled "Pop Song".

Katzman has worked with several artists as a songwriter and producer. He co-wrote and produced Face the Fire, an album by Michelle Chamuel, and co-wrote several songs for an album by Criss. He performs with the Irish-fusion band The Olllam, funk band Vulfpeck, and as a solo act.

Katzman released a single titled "Hard Work" in October 2016. Katzman's second studio album Heartbreak Hits was released in January 2017. According to Katzman, the album's concept was about heartbreak and loss. A review by Lee Zimmerman noted the album's "upbeat" tone despite the underlying lyrical concept.

In October 2019, Katzman released a single titled "You Could Be President", a preview of his third studio album Modern Johnny Sings: Songs in the Age of Vibe. In December 2019, Katzman released two EPs of three songs each from the upcoming full-length album. These EPs were thematically organized, and were titled Modern Johnny Tackles the Issues and Modern Johnny Wallows in Introspection and Gently Goes Mad. The full album was released in January 2020 under the label Ten Good Songs.

Katzman released his fourth studio album, Be The Wheel, in March 2023. The album was recorded live to tape at Cinnamon Ranch, Katzman's studio in Michigan. Katzman released four songs, including the title track, as singles before the release of the full album. He also formally announced his record label, Ten Good Songs, for recordings and productions by Theo Katzman. In 2023, Ten Good Songs released both Be The Wheel and an album by May Erlewine titled The Real Thing. In 2025, Katzman released a single through Ten Good Songs titled Rome Wasn't Built in a Day

== Style ==
Katzman grew up listening to classic rock and soul music. His influences include soul, R&B, funk, rock and folk. As a songwriter, a primary focus for him is a song's lyrical theme. He writes parts for guitar, bass, drums, and keyboards. His favorite songwriters are those who "capture a moment in cultural time" such as Frank Ocean, Joni Mitchell and Paul Simon.

== Personal life ==
Katzman's father, Lee Katzman, was a jazz trumpet player with the big bands of the 50s and 60s (Stan Kenton Band, Benny Goodman, Buddy Rich, Gene Krupa) and the CBS and NBC orchestras. In the late 60s he was a member of Herb Albert's Baja Marimba Band. Katzman's maternal grandparents, Albert Tipton (flutist) and Mary Norris (pianist) were both classical musicians with the Detroit Symphony Orchestra, the St. Louis Symphony Orchestra, the Aspen Music Festival and the Philadelphia Orchestra.

== Vulfpeck ==
In addition to his solo work, Katzman is a member of the funk band Vulfpeck. The band was formed in 2011 as a four-piece instrumental group with Katzman on guitar, drums and vocals, Jack Stratton on keyboards, drums and guitar, Woody Goss on keyboards, and Joe Dart on bass. The band has released four EPs and six studio albums.

== Discography ==
=== Albums ===
==== Studio albums ====
===== Solo albums =====
Title	Album details
Romance Without Finance	Released: November 15, 2011; Label: Self-released; Format: CD, digital download
Heartbreak Hits	Released: January 6, 2017; Label: Self-released; Format: Digital download, streaming
Modern Johnny Sings: Songs in the Age of Vibe	Released: January 10, 2020; Label: Ten Good Songs; Format: Digital download, streaming
Be the Wheel	Released: March 10, 2023; Label: Ten Good Songs; Format: Digital download, streaming

===== with Ella Riot =====
Title	Album details
Dancethink	Released: October 11, 2009; Label: Self-released; Format: CD, digital download

===== with Vulfpeck =====
Title	Album details
Mit Peck (EP)	Released: December 20, 2011; Label: Vulf; Format: Vinyl, digital download
Vollmilch (EP)	Released: December 20, 2012; Label: Vulf; Format: Vinyl, digital download
My First Car (EP)	Released: December 6, 2013; Label: Vulf; Format: Vinyl, digital download
Fugue State (EP)	Released: August 26, 2014; Label: Vulf; Format: Vinyl, digital download
Thrill of the Arts	Released: October 9, 2015; Label: Vulf; Format: CD, LP, digital download
The Beautiful Game	Released: October 17, 2016; Label: Vulf; Format: LP, digital download
Mr. Finish Line	Released: November 7, 2017; Label: Vulf; Format: LP, digital download
Hill Climber	Released: December 7, 2018; Label: Vulf; Format: CD, vinyl, LP, digital download
Live at Madison Square Garden	Released: December 10, 2019; Label: Vulf; Format: Vinyl, LP, digital download, streaming
The Joy of Music, the Job of Real Estate	Released: October 23, 2020; Label: Vulf; Format: Vinyl, digital download, streaming
Schvitz	Released: December 30, 2022; Label: Vulf; Format: Vinyl, digital download, streaming
Clarity of Cal	Released: March 4, 2025; Label: Vulf; Format: Vinyl, digital download, streaming
MSG II (Live at Madison Square Garden)	Released: December 12, 2025; Label: Vulf; Format: Vinyl, digital download, streaming

Schvitz

==== Live albums ====
Title	Album details
Jam in the Van - Theo Katzman (Live Session, Azusa, CA, 2016)	Released: December 19, 2016; Label: Jam in the Van; Format: Digital download, streaming
Theo Katzman on Audiotree Live	Released: April 9, 2018; Label: Audiotree; Format: Digital download, streaming
My Heart Is Live in Berlin	Released: April 26, 2019; Label: Ten Good Songs; Format: Vinyl, digital download, streaming
Modern Johnny Sings: Songs in The Age of Live	Released: 2022; Label: Ten Good Songs; Format: Vinyl, digital download, streaming
Live From the Other Side	Released: September 13, 2024; Label: Ten Good Songs; Format: Vinyl, digital download, streaming

=== Extended plays ===
Title	Album details
Solo Acoustic	Released: 2010; Label: Self-released; Format: CD, digital download
Theo Katzman on Audiotree Live	Released: 2018; Label: Audiotree; Format: Digital download, streaming
Modern Johnny Tackles the Issues	Released: December 6, 2019; Label: Self-released; Format: Digital download, streaming
Modern Johnny Wallows in Introspection and Gently Goes Mad	Released: December 20, 2019; Label: Ten Good Songs; Format: Digital download, streaming
For Superman EP	Released: March 20, 2026; Label: Ten Good Songs; Format: Vinyl

=== As lead artist ===
Title	Year	Album
"Pop Song"	2013	Non-album single
"Hard Work"	2016	Non-album single
"My Heart Is Dead"	2016	Non-album single
"You Could Be President"	2019	Modern Johnny Sings: Songs in the Age of Vibe / Modern Johnny Tackles the Issues
"Rome Wasn't Built in a Day"	2025	Non-album single
"For Superman"	2026	Non-album single

==== As featured artist ====
Title	Year	Album
"Something Good" (Jacob Jeffries featuring Theo Katzman)	2018	Mother Land
"Highest Bidder" (Jacob Jeffries featuring Theo Katzman)	2018	Mother Land
"Easy" (May Erlewine featuring Theo Katzman)	2022	Tiny Beautiful Things
"Worlds Apart" (May Erlewine featuring Theo Katzman)	2022	Tiny Beautiful Things
"Sunday" (Nick Campbell Destroys featuring Theo Katzman)	2022	Art
"Leon Keys" (Lee Pardini featuring Theo Katzman and Joe Dart)	2022	Leon Keys (EP)
"One More Try" (Joey Dosik featuring Theo Katzman)	2023	The Nostalgiac
"Like a Movie" (Taylor Ashton featuring Theo Katzman)	2023	Stranger to the Feeling
"Lisa Never Wanted to Be Famous" (Cory Wong featuring Theo Katzman)	2026	Lost in the Wonder

=== Production and writing credits ===
Year	Artist	Album	Song	Notes
2012	Anna Ash	These Holy Days	"Heartbreak Season"	drums, bass, co-producer
2012	Anna Ash	These Holy Days	"Shoot Me With Your Best Shot"	drums, acoustic guitar, electric guitar, vocals, co-producer
2012	Anna Ash	These Holy Days	"These Holy Days"	drums, percussion, vocals, co-producer
2012	Hannah Winkler	—N/a	"Hide It Away"	co-producer, bass, guitar, snare drum
2013	Teddy Geiger	The Last Fears	"Ordinary Man"	drums, additional arranging
2013	Teddy Geiger	The Last Fears	"Home"	drums, co-writer
2013	Teddy Geiger	The Last Fears	"Figure It Out"	drums, guitar
2013	Teddy Geiger	The Last Fears	"Ordinary Man"	drums, guitar
2013	Teddy Geiger	The Last Fears	"Happier"	drums, bass
2013	Michelle Chamuel	—N/a	"Go Down Singing"	co-producer, bass, guitar, snare drum, writer
2013	Chrystian Rawk	—N/a	"Famous"	co-producer, drums, acoustic guitar, electric guitar
2014	Dylan Saunders	Confluence	—N/a	co-writer (tracks 1, 4, 6, 7, 8, 9, 11), backing vocals (tracks 1, 3)
2014	Jason French	—N/a	"You Just Want My Money"	co-writer, co-producer, backing vocals, bass, guitar, drums
2015	Michelle Chamuel	Face the Fire	—N/a	writer, performer, producer (all tracks)
2015	Vérité	—N/a	"Wasteland"	bass, guitar
2017	Kesha	Rainbow	"Rainbow"	percussion
2018	Mike Viola	The American Egypt	"Collins"	drums
2018	Woman Believer	Dunzo (EP)	—N/a	drums (tracks 1, 2, 3), bass (tracks 2, 3), guitar (track 3)
2019	May Erlewine	Second Sight	"That's My Home"	electric guitar
2019	Ryan Lerman	Noisy Feelings	"American Dream"	backing vocals
2019	Ryan Lerman	Noisy Feelings	"Hard To Break Up"	drums
2019	Ryan Lerman	Noisy Feelings	"Windy Day"	backing vocals
2019	Ryan Lerman	Noisy Feelings	"Mexico"	drums, percussion
2019	Allen Stone	Building Balance	"Miscommunicate"	co-writer
2019	Allen Stone	Building Balance	"Chippin' Away"	co-writer
2020	Woody and Jeremy	Strange Satisfaction	—N/a	drums (tracks 1 and 7), guitar (track 7), background vocals (tracks 3, 4, 7)
2020	Carly Rae Jepsen	Dedicated Side B	"Window"	bass, backing vocals, drums, guitar, co-writer, co-producer
2018	Woman Believer	The Hot Years	—N/a	percussion (track 7), guitar (track 14)
2021	Antwaun Stanley and Tyler Duncan	Ascension	—N/a	writer, drums, guitar, congas, percussion
2021	Rett Madison	Pin-Up Daddy	—N/a	producer (all tracks), drums (all tracks), percussion (tracks 1 and 7), guitar (tracks 1, 2, 3, 4, 7, 9), background vocals (track 1), Wurlitzer (track 2)
2021	Hobo Johnson	The Revenge of Hobo Johnson	"I Want You Back"	co-writer
2023	May Erlewine	The Real Thing	—N/a	producer, drums
2023	Taylor Ashton	Stranger to the Feeling	"Strong Hands"	background vocals
2023	Rett Madison	One For Jackie	"Lipstick"	drums, congas, additional percussion
2023	Rett Madison	One For Jackie	"Fortune Teller"	Wurlitzer, background vocals
2023	Rett Madison	One For Jackie	"One for Jackie, One for Crystal"	percussion, congas, bass drum
2023	Rett Madison	One For Jackie	"Mediums, Therapists, and Sheriffs"	drums
2024	Brittany Howard	Thelma the Unicorn Soundtrack	"Fire Inside"	co-writer, guitar
2025	May Erlewine	What It Takes	—N/a	producer, drums
2025	Benjamin Jaffe	Songs for Agreement	—N/a	producer, drums
2025	Jacob Jeffries	You Got the Right Idea	—N/a	producer, drums
