= Joe Dart =

American bassist (born 1991)

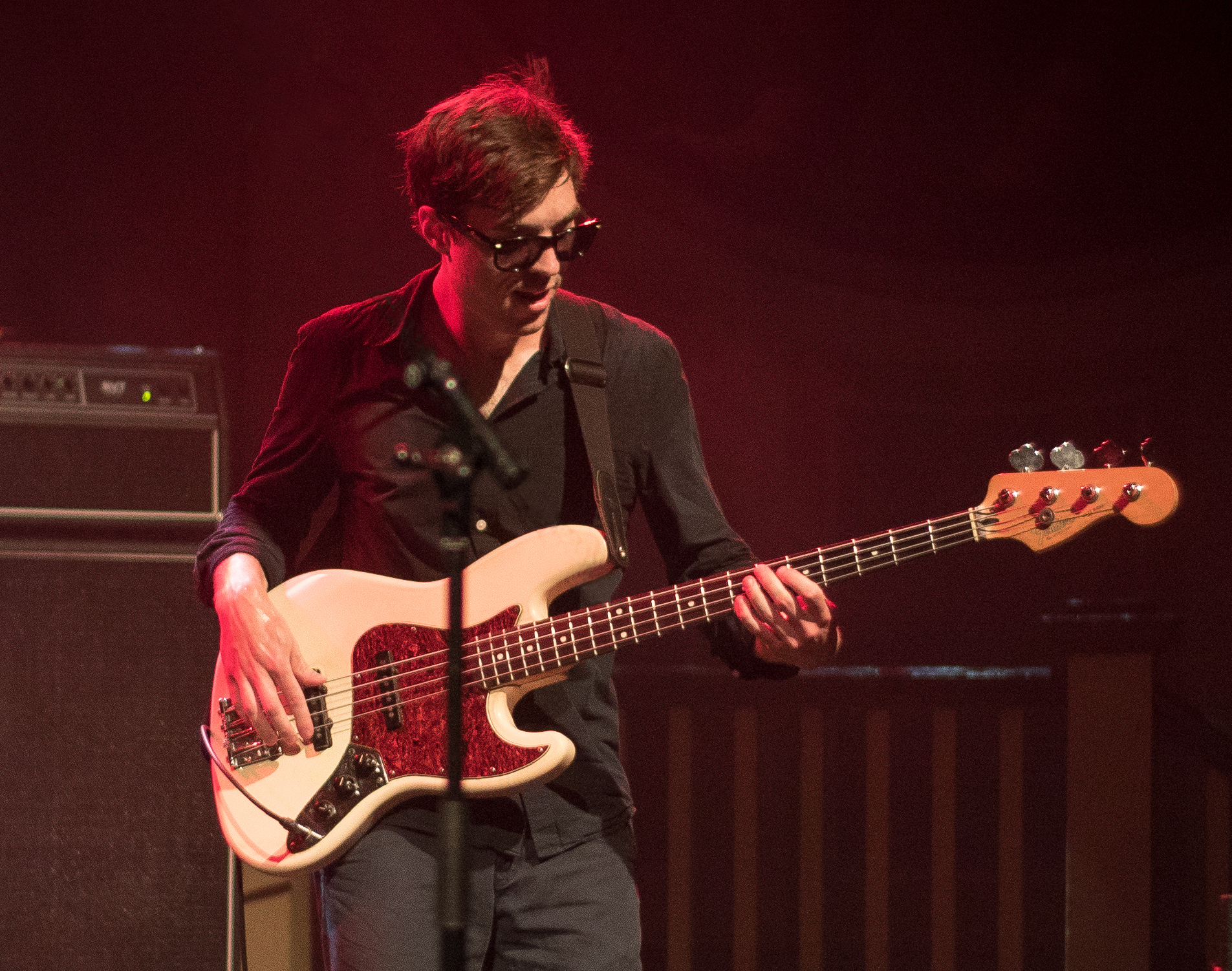
- Dart performing in 2017

Background information
- Born: April 18, 1991 (age 35)
- Origin: Harbor Springs, Michigan, U.S.
- Genres: Funk; jazz funk; rock; R&B; pop; Irish fusion
- Occupation: Musician
- Instrument: Bass guitar
- Years active: 2010–present
- Member of: Vulfpeck; The Fearless Flyers; The Olllam
- Formerly of: Ella Riot; Something Different in the Homemade Jam

Joe Dart (born April 18, 1991) is an American bassist. He is best known as a founding member of Vulfpeck and The Fearless Flyers. He also tours and records with Theo Katzman and the Irish-fusion band The Olllam. His background spans several genres including funk, rock, jazz and R&B. He was voted the coolest new bassist in Bass Guitar magazine's readers poll in 2019.

== Early life ==
Dart grew up in Harbor Springs, Michigan. He was raised in a musical family and had access to musical instruments in his childhood home. His maternal grandfather Israel Baker was a professional violinist, and his mother exposed him to a variety of live performances. He briefly played the trombone. At age eight he started to play bass guitar. His first instrument was a Samick bass, followed by a Fender Jazz Bass at age twelve. His early music teachers were semi-retired seasoned bassists and exposed him to their musical influences. He was fascinated by the instrument's melodic role and gravitated to funk. He names bassist Flea of the Red Hot Chili Peppers as his major early influence. At age fourteen he attended Flea's Silverlake Conservatory for a week. He played in school bands and in a Phish-inspired jam band called Something Different in the Homemade Jam.

== Career ==
In 2009, Dart attended the University of Michigan School of Music. He had a reputation as a bassist and he quickly fit into the university's music scene. In 2010, he toured with the electro-rock band My Dear Disco (aka Ella Riot) and recorded on the band's Love Child EP. He performed in the jazz-funk band Groove Spoon (the college band of Jack Stratton). The band released an EP titled Live From the Dude in 2010. There, he also met Theo Katzman and Woody Goss, and along with Stratton the quartet recorded several instrumental songs for a friend's thesis project. In 2011, one of the songs, titled "Beastly", was released on YouTube. The release was noted by No Treble, an online magazine for bass players, for its bass performance. The track's reception became an impetus for the group's subsequent recording career as Vulfpeck.

Dart has recorded six albums and four extended plays with Vulfpeck and has toured in the United States, Europe and Japan. He also performs and records with the Irish-fusion band The Olllam (Note: The Olllam was co-founded by Dart's My Dear Disco bandmate Tyler Duncan.) and singer-songwriters Theo Katzman and Joey Dosik. He is a member of the instrumental funk band The Fearless Flyers (founded in 2018) and has recorded two albums and four extended plays with the group. In 2023, Dart released a set of seven instructional videos on bass playing approach and technique.

== Influences ==
Dart names bassist Flea of the Red Hot Chili Peppers as his primary influence. He credits Flea for being musically present and visible as a bass player when Dart was growing up. Through influences present in Flea's work, Dart discovered other bassists who influenced him. Dart's influences include Rocco Prestia, Verdine White, Pino Palladino, Bernard Edwards, (Note: Dart: "My favorite bass tone is Bernard Edwards' on the Chic records (...) My favorite pure-tone player is Pino.") Stuart Zender, Bootsy Collins, Victor Wooten, John Entwistle, James Jamerson, Stevie Wonder. He was drawn to the late 1960s and early 1970s funk and disco, and the 1990s funk-disco revival. His favorite basslines appear in: Sly and the Family Stone's "If You Want Me to Stay", Tower of Power's "What Is Hip?", and Red Hot Chili Peppers' "If You Have to Ask".

== Equipment ==
Early on Dart played a Fender Jazz Bass with Seymour Duncan Antiquity II pickups and Rotosound Swing Bass 66 roundwound strings. In 2019, he switched to playing his signature bass, released by Music Man guitar company. As of 2026 five signature models have been released: the Ernie Ball Joe Dart Bass, the Joe Dart Jr., Joe Dart II, Joe Dart III, and the Sterling Joe Dart Vision. (Note: Sterling versions of the Joe Dart I, Joe Dart II, and Joe Dart III have also been issued.)

Other instruments that he has recorded with include:

- Carlo Robelli bass with Music Man pickups
- Fender Precision Junior bass
- Squier Classic Vibe Precision bass
- Music Man StingRay bass
- Music Man Sterling bass

His strings include: Rotosound Swing Bass 66 roundwounds, Thomastik-Infeld flatwounds, La Bella flatwounds. His rig includes: Markbass Little Mark Tube 800 amplifier, Markbass Standard 104HR speakers, Radial Engineering ProDI direct box.

== Recognition ==
In 2013 Dart was ranked No Treble magazine's 5th favorite bassist (an online magazine for bass players), and in 2017 he was ranked 1st. In 2019 he was voted the coolest new bassist in Bass Guitar magazine's readers poll. In 2021 he was voted number two on MusicRadar's readers poll of the greatest bassists of the 21st century.

== Discography ==
The Fearless Flyers

- The Fearless Flyers (2018)
- The Fearless Flyers II (2019)
- Tailwinds (2020)
- Flyers Live at Madison Square Garden (2021)
- The Fearless Flyers III (2022)
- The Fearless Flyers IV (2024)
- The Fearless Flyers V (2025)
- Live in Italy (2025)

The Olllam

- The Olllam (2012)
- Elllegy (2022)

With Theo Katzman

- Romance Without Finance (2011)
- Heartbreak Hits (2017)
- Modern Johnny Sings: Songs in the Age of Vibe (2020)
- Be the Wheel (2023)
