= May Erlewine =

American musician

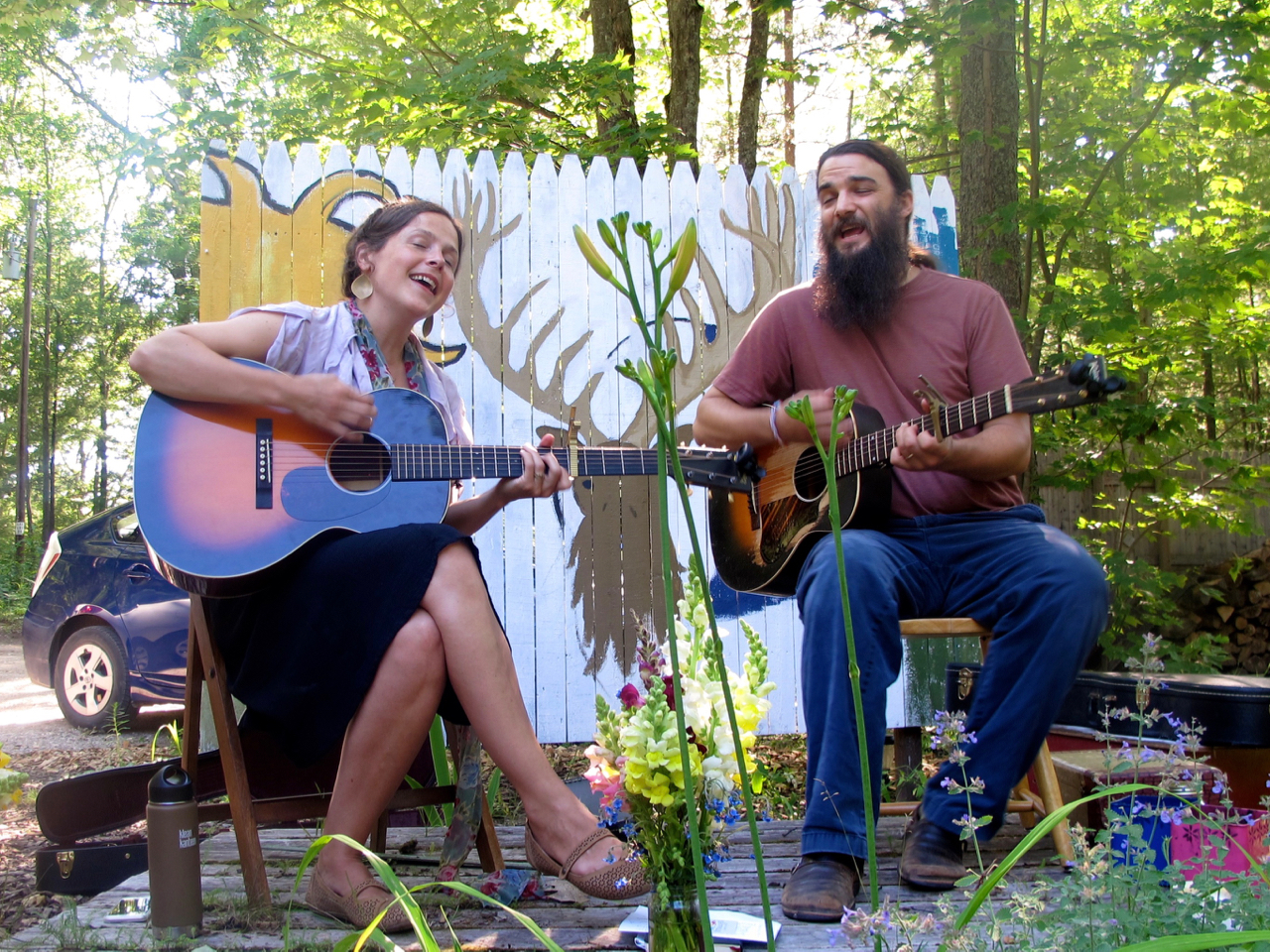
- May Erlewine and Samuel Seth Bernard

Background information
- Also known as: Daisy May; Daisy May Erlewine; May Erlewine Bernard
- Born: May Erlewine; May 13, 1982 (age 44)
- Origin: Big Rapids, Michigan, U.S.
- Genres: Folk music; blues
- Occupations: Musician; singer; songwriter
- Instruments: Vocals, guitar, piano, violin
- Labels: Earthwork Music Collective, Ten Good Songs
- Website: mayerlewine.com

May Belle Erlewine (born May 13, 1983) is an American singer-songwriter and musician from Big Rapids, Michigan. She plays the guitar, piano, and violin. She has released over 15 albums since the early 2000s.

Erlewine is part of the Earthwork Music collective, an independent label which promotes original music from regional artists founded by Erlewine's former husband, Samuel Seth Bernard. Erlewine has performed solo, as a duet with Max Lockwood, with the May Erlewine band, with May Erlewine and the Motivations, and with the Sweet Water Warblers.

== Biography ==
May Erlewine was born to a musical family; her father Michael Erlewine was a member of The Prime Movers, a Michigan blues band and he founded the online music guide AllMusic while her uncle is a luthier. According to Mark Deming, her work shows a variety of musical influences including folk, bluegrass, rock & roll, and blues. Her music is influenced from her experiences during childhood, being home-schooled and surrounded by music, and as a teenager, when she hitch-hiked across North America, riding freight trains and performing on the streets (busking).

In addition to her discography, Erlewine's music has appeared in other forms. The song, "Shine On" was covered by Rani Arbo and Daisy Mayhem on their 2007 album Big Old Life and by Sawyer Fredericks during the final round of The Voice in 2015. The soundtrack for the 2014 movie Old Fashioned, included her performance of "Joy", along with Ralston Bowles. Two of Erlewine and Samuel Seth Bernard's songs (Rise Up Singing, from the album Mother Moon, and Shine On, from the album Seth & May) appear in Rise Again. The song book, released in 2016, is a sequel to Rise Up Singing, a popular folk music fake book.

In late 2018, Erlewine played a series of collaborative shows with fellow singer-songwriters Sav Buist and Katie Larson (both from The Accidentals) and Beth Nielsen Chapman, a singer and songwriter. For much of each year, Erlewine writes songs and performs in Northern Michigan.

== Personal life ==
Erlewine's former husband is singer-songwriter Samuel Seth Bernard. Their daughter was born in January 2014.

== Discography ==
- Sleepless (May Erlewine, 2003)
- Heart Song (May Erlewine, 2004)
- Seth Bernard and Daisy May (Seth Bernard & May Erlewine, 2005)
- Mother Moon (May Erlewine, 2007)
- Snow Songs (May Erlewine, 2008)
- Welcome Back (Seth Bernard & May Erlewine, 2009)
- Love Labor (May Erlewine, 2009)
- Golden (May Erlewine, 2010)
- Wedding EP (Seth Bernard & May Erlewine, 2011)
- New Flower (Seth Bernard & May Erlewine, 2011)
- The Long Way Home (May Erlewine, 2012)
- We Can Change / Siren Song (Seth Bernard & May Erlewine, 2013)
- Where We Are (May Erlewine, 2014)
- Shine On (May Erlewine, 2015)
- New Flower, Volume 2 (Seth Bernard & May Erlewine, 2015)
- Lean Into the Wind (May Erlewine, 2016)
- The Little Things EP (May Erlewine, 2016)
- With You (The Sweet Water Warblers, 2017)
- Mother Lion (May Erlewine, 2017)
- In The Night (The Motivations, 2019)
- Second Sight (May Erlewine, 2019)
- Anyway (May Erlewine & Woody Goss, 2020)
- Tiny Beautiful Things (May Erlewine, 2022)
- The Real Thing (May Erlewine, 2023)
- What It Takes (May Erlewine, 2025)
