= Woody Goss =

American musician (born c. 1989)

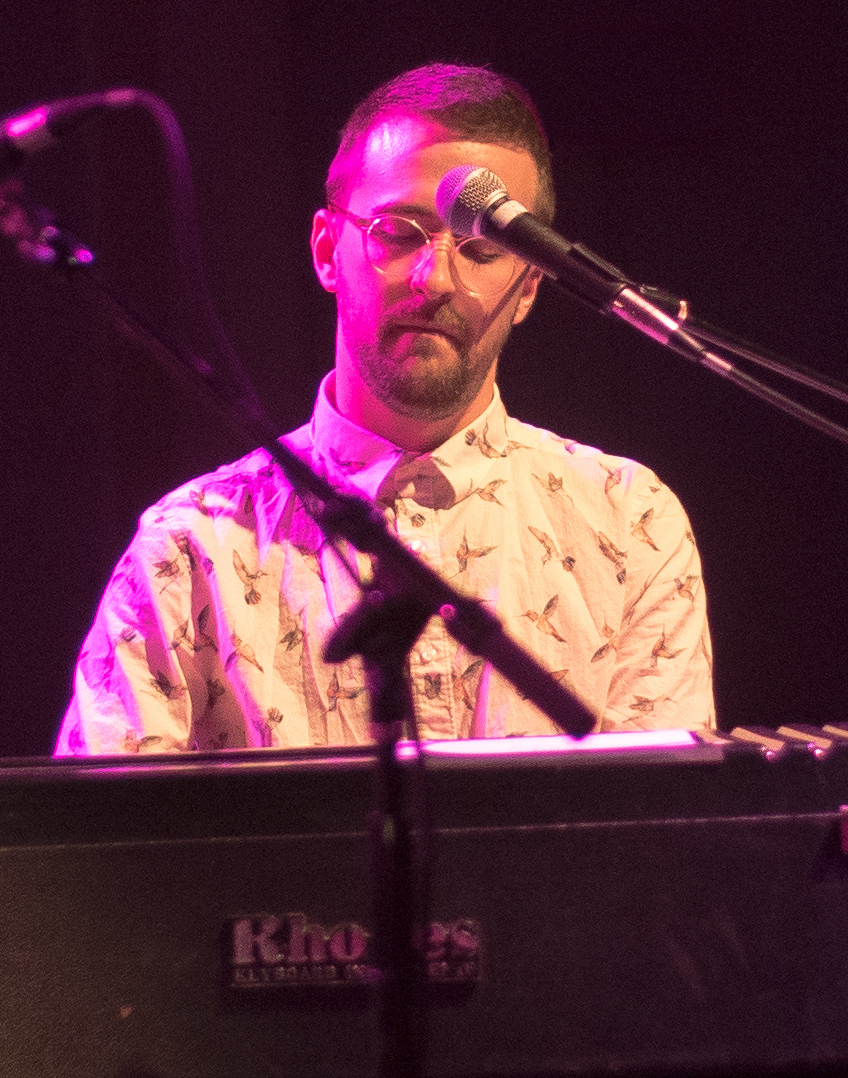
- Goss in 2017

Background information
- Born: c. 1989 (age 36–37); Skokie, Illinois, U.S.
- Genres: Jazz; funk; R&B; pop
- Occupations: Musician; songwriter; record producer
- Instruments: Piano; keyboards
- Years active: 2011–present
- Member of: Vulfpeck; Woody and Jeremy

Woody Goss (born c. 1989) is an American musician, keyboardist and songwriter. He is best known as a founding member of the funk band Vulfpeck. His background spans several genres including funk, jazz, R&B, and pop. He has released several solo albums, and albums in collaboration with Jeremy Daly and May Erlewine. His most recent album High Loon! was released in 2023.

== Life and career ==
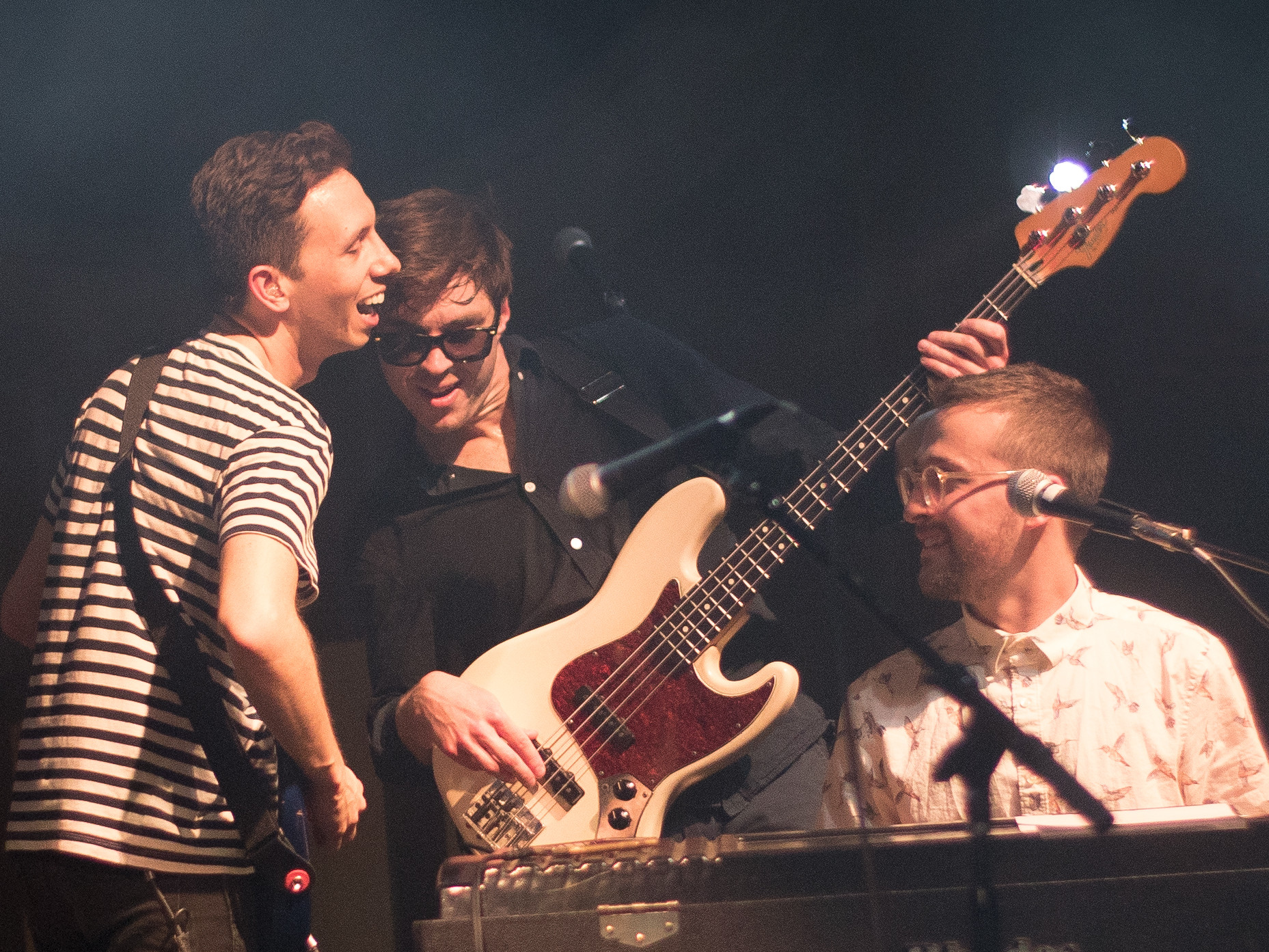
Goss (right) performing with Vulfpeck in 2017.

Goss grew up in Skokie, Illinois. His father had a passion for jazz music and played the piano. Goss started to play piano at age seven. In his early teens he was drawn to bebop jazz through the works of pianist Thelonious Monk. In high school he was drawn to funk music through the works of George Clinton, Sly and the Family Stone and James Brown. He played in the rhythm section of his high school band.

He studied jazz piano at the University of Michigan School of Music. In college he played psychedelic jazz in a band called Honey. He booked musical acts at the Canterbury House, a church and music venue associated with the university. The venue became a hub where Goss met like-minded musicians, including Jack Stratton and Theo Katzman, who along with Goss and bassist Joe Dart started recording as Vulfpeck in 2011.

Goss has recorded six albums and four extended plays with Vulfpeck. His songwriting credits with the band include "Tee Time", "Fugue State", "Dean Town", "My First Car", "A Walk to Remember" and others. In 2019, he released a Christmas album titled A Very Vulfy Christmas consisting of eight jazz-style rearrangements of Vulfpeck originals. The recordings feature drummer Dana Hall and bassists Matt Ulery and Joe Fee. The album was accompanied by a Peanuts-style cartoon of the same title, written by Goss and Sean Peecook, and featuring the members of Vulfpeck as cartoon characters.

Goss has released two jazz albums and one R&B album as a solo artist, titled Solo Rhodes (2016), Rainbow Beach (2021), and High Loon! (2023). (Note: Genres as categorized on the Apple Music streaming service) He has released three albums in collaboration with musician Jeremy Daly titled Strange Satisfaction (2020), Gravy in My Coffee (2021), and Hold Up, Look Back (2024). The albums are categorized on streaming services as pop, rock, and alternative. In 2020, Goss and singer-songwriter May Erlewine jointly produced and released an album titled Anyway.

== Influences ==
Goss started with classical piano lessons at an early age. His interest and musical influences evolved over time from oldies R&B-pop as a child, to bebop jazz via Thelonious Monk as a teenager, to funk and groove-based music via Parliament-Funkadelic and James Brown in high school, to experimental rock via Frank Zappa and Ween in college. His bandmates Stratton and Dart describe him as a natural improviser.

== Personal life ==
Goss is an avid birdwatcher and lives in the Chicago area. He has led workshops and master classes at the Music Department of Columbia College Chicago.

== Discography ==
Solo albums

- Solo Rhodes (2016)
- Rainbow Beach (2021)
- High Loon! (2023)

As Woody Goss Trio

- A Very Vulfy Christmas (2019)

As co-leader

- Strange Satisfaction (2020), as Woody and Jeremy
- Gravy in My Coffee (2021), as Woody and Jeremy
- Hold Up, Look Back (2024), as Woody and Jeremy
- Anyway (2020), with May Erlewine
