= Phox (band) =

American indie pop/alternative folk band

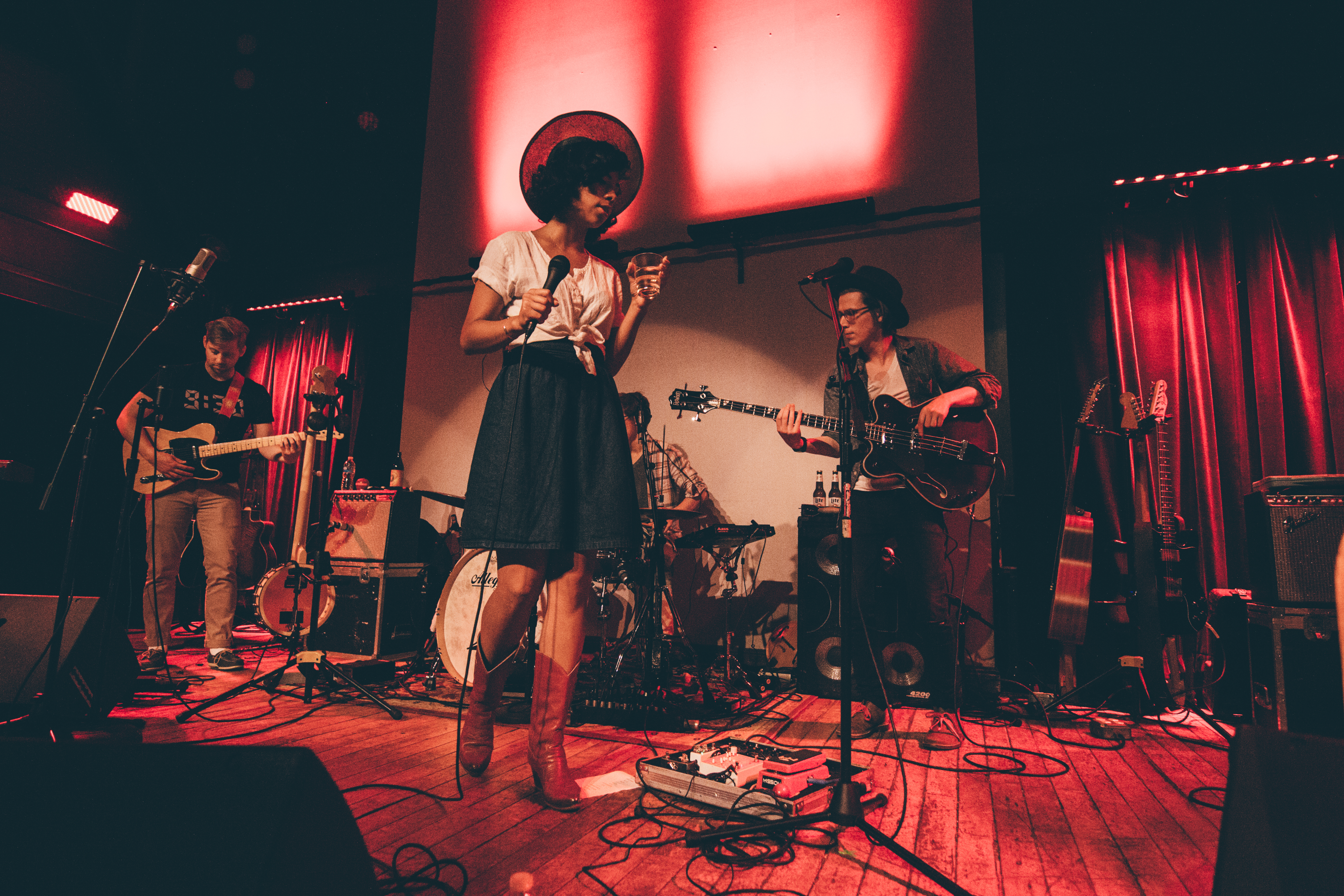
- Phox performing in June 2014

Background information
- Origin: Baraboo, Wisconsin, US
- Genres: Alternative folk; indie pop
- Years active: 2011–2017
- Labels: Partisan; Dine Alone (Canada)
- Past members: Jason Krunnfusz; Monica Martin; Matthew Holmen; Matteo Roberts; Davey Roberts; Zach Johnston; Cheston VanHuss

Phox was an American six-piece alternative folk / indie pop band from Baraboo, Wisconsin. Active from 2011 until 2017, they released their self-titled debut LP on June 24, 2014.

== History ==
Prior to the formation of Phox, many eventual members collaborated with Zach Johnston for his album Sonntag, which was written in San Francisco, but recorded in Wisconsin. Some time later while Matt Holmen was playing with Davey Roberts, Matt Roberts (keys), and Jason Krunnfusz (bass) in Baraboo. The group connected once again for what was originally thought to be a one-off show at the local event, Boo Bash on May 4, 2011.

The group still needed songs to play and someone to sing them. Monica Martin was asked if she'd sing some tracks from Sonntag and some cover songs at the event and she agreed. Moving forward, Monica wrote lyrics and melodies, and the group arranged the songs from their first two EP's and their self-titled first record release.

The band released their EP Confetti in early 2013, for which they created a video component for each track. 2013 also saw a Daytrotter session, positive press, a spot at South by Southwest and a national tour opening for Blitzen Trapper. The band played Lollapalooza as a last-minute addition in August 2013, drawing a large crowd despite their midday spot. In September 2013 Phox opened for The Lumineers at Apple's iTunes Festival in London.

Local Wisconsin publication Isthmus praised Phox as one of the year's greatest musical success stories. In 2015, Phox supported Paolo Nutini and The Head and the Heart, while also headlining around the US non-stop. In March 2015, they made their debut in New Zealand and Australia during March 2015.

They were featured on NPR Music's Tiny Desk Concert. Other notable festival stops included Coachella, Bonnaroo, Firefly, Summerfest, Sasquatch, and the inaugural Eaux Claires Music and Arts Festival where they also screened their latest mockumentary film titled, Amor Fati, directed by member Zach Johnston. The film was uploaded publicly to YouTube on December 24, 2015. The band signed to Partisan Records, and were managed by Foundations Artist Management. They recorded their first full-length, self-titled album at April Base – Justin Vernon's home studio in Eau Claire, Wisconsin.

Phox announced an indefinite hiatus on October 17, 2016, after which they decided to conclude their time as a band and played their farewell concert at the Al. Ringling Theatre in their hometown of Baraboo, Wisconsin, on February 4, 2017.

== Members ==
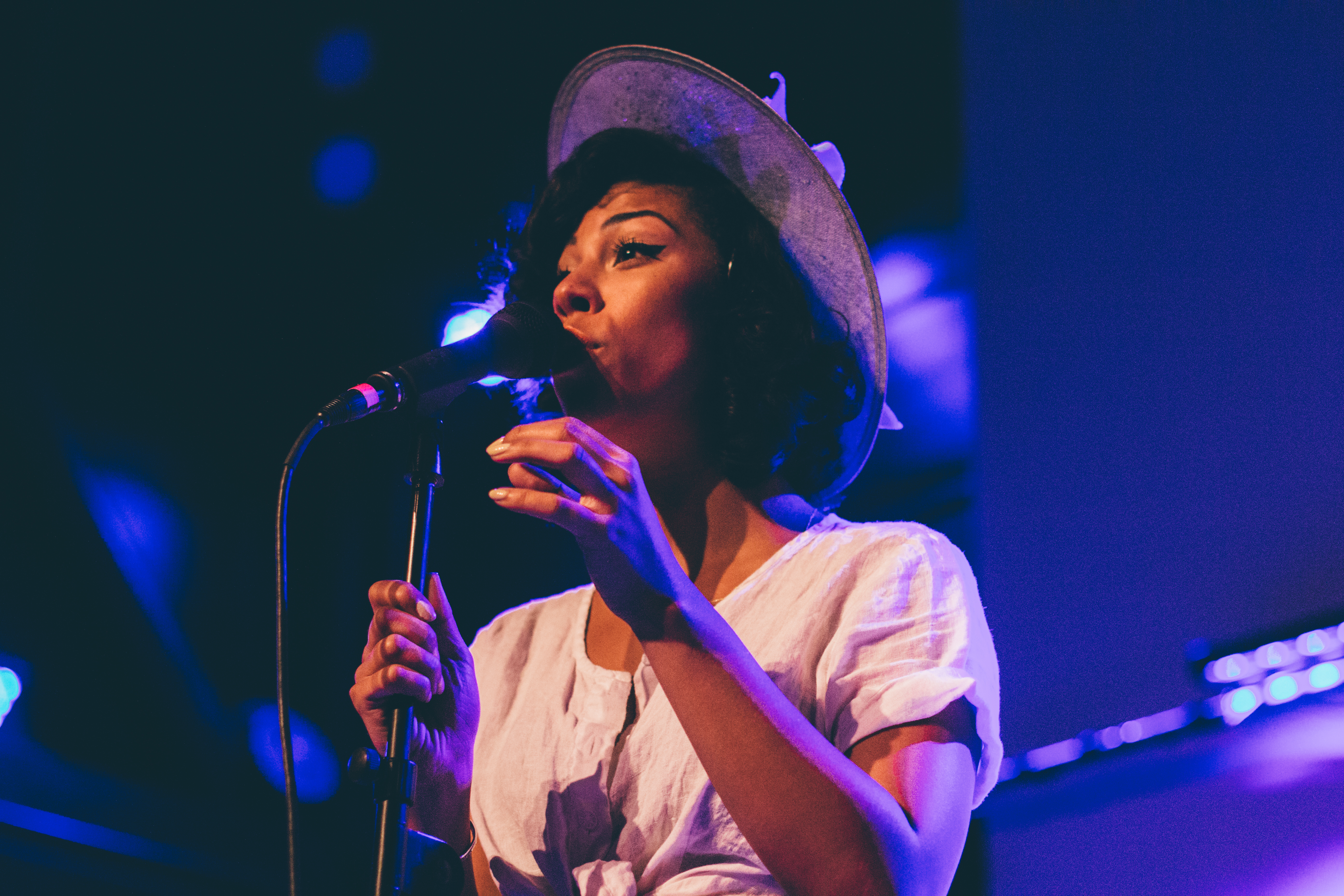
Monica Martin singing in 2014

- Monica Martin – lead vocals (2011–2017)
- Matthew Holmen – guitar, trumpet (2011–2017)
- Jason Krunnfusz – guitar, bass guitar (2011–2017)
- Davey Roberts – drums (2011–2017)
- Matteo Roberts – keyboards (2011–2017)
- Zach Johnston – banjo (2011–2015)
- Cheston VanHuss – bass guitar, clarinet, flute (2011–2013)

== Discography ==
=== Albums ===
- iTunes Festival: London 2013 (2013)
- Phox (2014)

=== Extended plays ===
- Unblushing (2012)
- Friendship (2012)
- Confetti (2013)
