= Jacob Jeffries Band =

American pop rock band

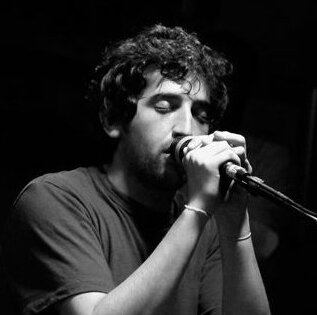
- Jeffries in 2012

Background information
- Origin: Ft. Lauderdale, FL, United States
- Genres: Alternative rock, pop rock
- Years active: 2006–present
- Label: Boom Boom 88 Music
- Website: jacobjeffriesband.com

Jacob Jeffries Band was an American pop rock band from Ft. Lauderdale, Florida. Formed in 2006, the band consisted of Jacob Jeffries (vocals, piano), Jimmy Powers V (electric guitar, backing vocals) and several alternating members.

Jacob Jeffries Band was named 2008's "Best Live Band & Best New Release' by the Broward-Palm Beach and Miami New Times, and were selected to perform in, and won the Florida Grammy Showcase.

== History ==
Singer and pianist Jacob Jeffries was born in Fort Lauderdale, Florida. He began playing the piano when he was 5 years old and writing original music at age 10. He wasn't planning on pursuing a music career under any other moniker other than his birth name (a different last name) but the death of his father Jeffrey fell just weeks before the first EP release (Life As An Extra). His stage surname, Jeffries, is a nod to his father. In 2006, Jeffries formed the Jacob Jeffries Band with friends Jimmy Powers on guitar, Brian Lang on bass and Josh "Papa Bear" Connolly on drums.

Between 2006 and 2012, Jeffries released two EP's, Life As An Extra and Wonderful, a live album, Waiting For The Piano Movers, and a full-length studio album, Tell Me Secrets, that he recorded with Grammy Award-winning producers Sebastian Krys and Dan Warner.

In 2018, Jeffries co-wrote the songs "Upbeat Inspirational Song About Life" and "My Superhero Movie" for the animated film Teen Titans Go! To the Movies; for the latter, he provided the singing voice of Robin.

== Discography ==
Jacob Jeffries Band released a series of albums engineered and produced by Sebastian Krys and Dan Warner and published by Warner/Chappell Music.

=== Life As an Extra (2008) ===
Life As an Extra, the first CD by Jacob Jeffries Band was released in the beginning of 2008.

=== Wonderful (2008) ===
Wonderful was Jacob Jeffries Band's second project released later in 2008.

=== Waiting for the Piano Movers (2009) ===
In September 2009, the Jacob Jeffries Band was invited to Full Sail University for an all-expense-paid recording of their first live CD, Waiting for the Piano Movers. This live album features 10 songs all recorded at the live performance. One of the band's producers, Sebastian Krys, is a Full Sail graduate and brought the band back to his college. One of the final tracks is a song written for Jeffries's father who suddenly died a year or so before the recorded concert. Although the band released this live album shortly after Wonderful, it features many songs never heard before on either previous EP.

=== Tell Me Secrets (2012) ===
The band's fourth full-length studio album was released in 2012 under Boom Boom 88 Music. The album features cameo session musician Matt Chamberlain on drums. Tell Me Secrets was released on the freshly established Boom Boom 88 Music label that Jeffries and his business partners created in the fall of 2011.
