= Antwaun Stanley =

American singer and songwriter

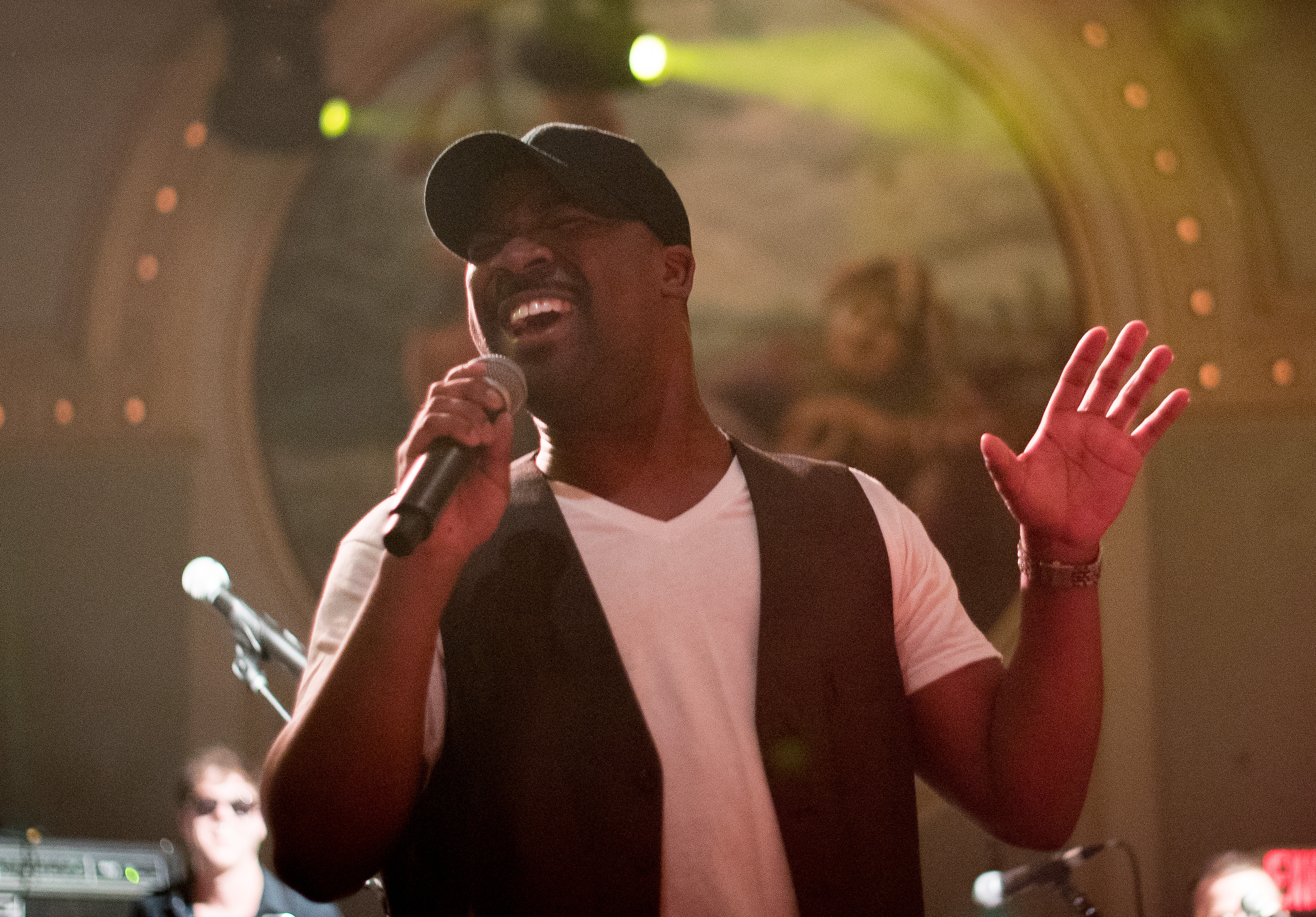
- Stanley in 2017

Background information
- Born: c. 1987 (age 38–39); Flint, Michigan, U.S.
- Genres: R&B; soul; gospel; funk
- Occupations: Singer; songwriter
- Instrument: Vocals
- Years active: 2006–present
- Labels: Independent, Bajada

Antwaun Stanley (born c. 1987) is an American singer and songwriter based in Ann Arbor, Michigan. He is the recurring vocalist of the funk band Vulfpeck. His solo album, titled I Can Do Anything, charted on the Billboard Gospel charts in 2006. His most recent extended play Ascension, with musician Tyler Duncan, was released in 2021.

== Career ==
Stanley grew up in Flint, Michigan. He began singing at age three and took part in talent competitions including The Queen Latifah Show and Showtime at the Apollo. He attended Flint Central High School and graduated in 2005. He signed with Bajada records, an independent record label, and studied at the University of Michigan. In college he released an album titled I Can Do Anything and took time off to pursue music. The album reached number 22 on the U.S. Gospel Albums chart. The album's third track, "Teach Me", reached number 29 on the U.S. Gospel Songs chart. In 2008 he was nominated for a Stellar Award in the category New Artist of the Year. In college he performed with the funk band Groove Spoon and with a cappella group Dicks and Janes.

Since graduating from college in 2011, Stanley has been a recurring member and vocalist of the funk band Vulfpeck, which is composed largely of University of Michigan alums. In the early 2010s, he performed and recorded with Ann Street Soul, and Video 7, a genre-free musical collective. In 2015 he opened for hip-hop artist Common.

In 2021, he released a collaborative EP, titled Ascension, with musician-producer Tyler Duncan. In 2024, Stanley and guitarist Cory Wong performed the song "Many Sounds, One Band" for the children's television series Yo Gabba GabbaLand!.

== Discography ==
Solo albums

- I Can Do Anything (2006)

With Tyler Duncan

- Ascension EP (2021)

With Ann Street Soul

- Ann Street Soul EP (2013)
- "Getaway" (2015)
- "Sunny" (2015)

With Vulfpeck

- "Wait for the Moment" (2013)
- "1612" (2014)
- "Funky Duck" (2015)
- The Beautiful Game (2016)
- Mr Finish Line (2017)
- "Darwin Derby" (2018)
- "3 on E" (2020)
- Schvitz (2022)
- Clarity of Cal (2025)

With Vulfmon

- "Lord Will Make a Way" (2023)
- "It Feels Good to Write a Song" (2024)

With Groove Spoon

- Live From the Dude (11.8.09) EP (2010)
- "You're Time" (2010)

With Cory Wong

- "Work It Out" (2017)
- "Pleasin'" (2017)
- "Jumbotron Hype Song" (2018)
- "United" (2021)

With Magic City Hippies

- "Little Bit of Love" (2025)
