= Joey Dosik =

American singer-songwriter

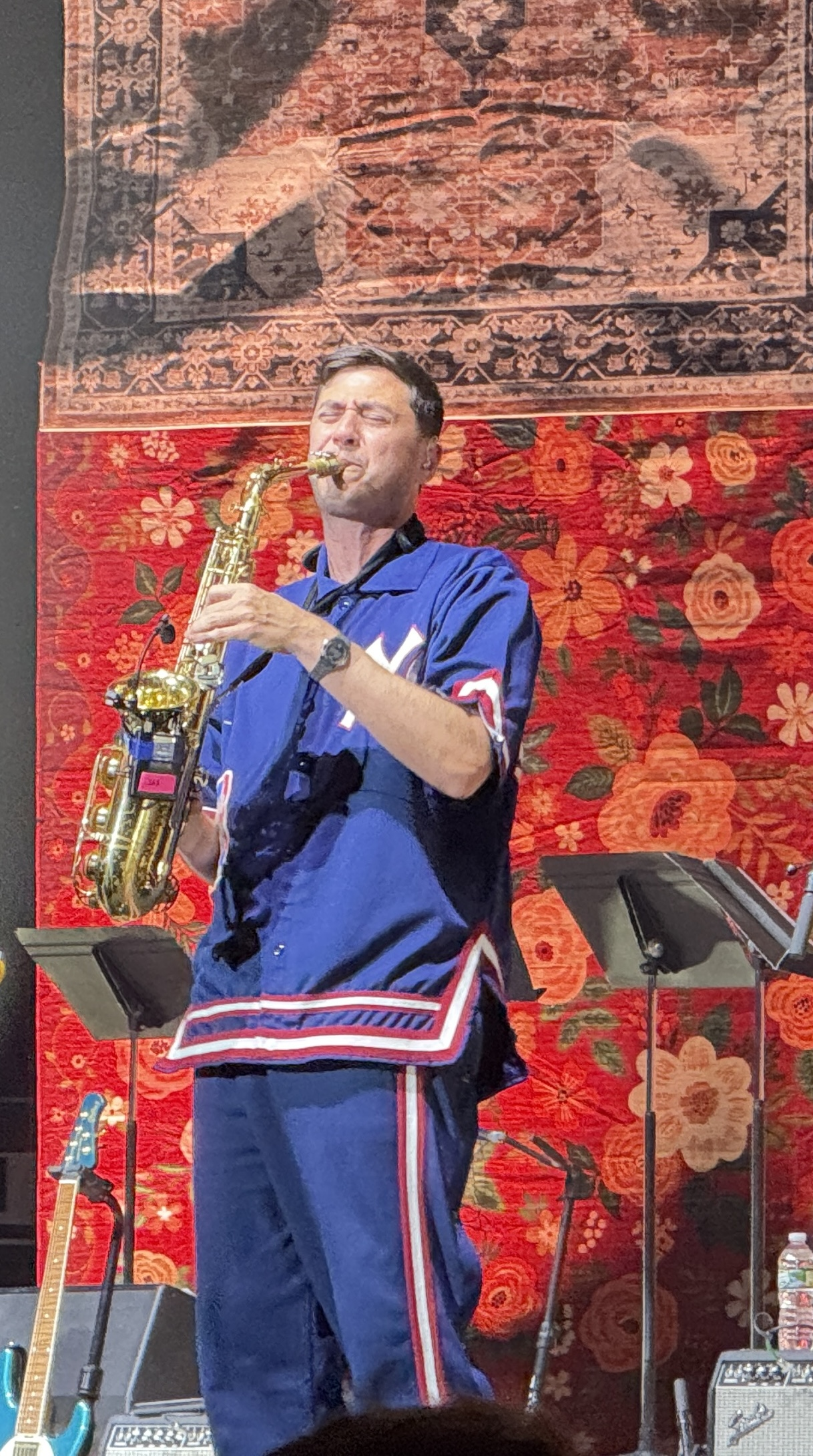
- Dosik performing with Vulfpeck in 2025

Background information
- Born: 1985 or 1986 (age 40–41); Los Angeles, California, U.S.
- Genres: Soul; R&B; pop; jazz; funk
- Occupations: Musician; singer; songwriter
- Instruments: Vocals; saxophone; keyboard; guitar
- Years active: 2007–present
- Label: Secretly Canadian
- Website: joeydosik.com

Joseph Dosik is an American musician, singer, and songwriter based in Los Angeles. He is known for being a recurring saxophonist, keyboardist, and vocalist of the funk band Vulfpeck. His most recent album, The Nostalgiac, was released in 2023.

== Career ==
Dosik grew up in Los Angeles, California. He started on piano at an early age. In his early teens he started on saxophone and was drawn to jazz and soul music. Influenced by alto saxophonist Arthur Blythe, he performed in the Los Angeles Leimert Park music scene which shaped his musical and cultural perspective on jazz. There he performed with veteran bassist Henry Grimes. He studied jazz and contemplative studies at the University of Michigan. In college he was a member of the Ann Arbor-based band Ella Riot.

In 2009 Dosik returned to Los Angeles and shifted his focus to singing and songwriting. He names Carole King, Sam Cooke and Marvin Gaye as musical influences. In 2012 he released his first solo EP titled Where Do They Come From?, and a second EP in 2016 titled Game Winner. He started performing as a solo artist and collaborating with the soul-funk band Vulfpeck. He performs with and has contributed to albums by Vulfpeck.

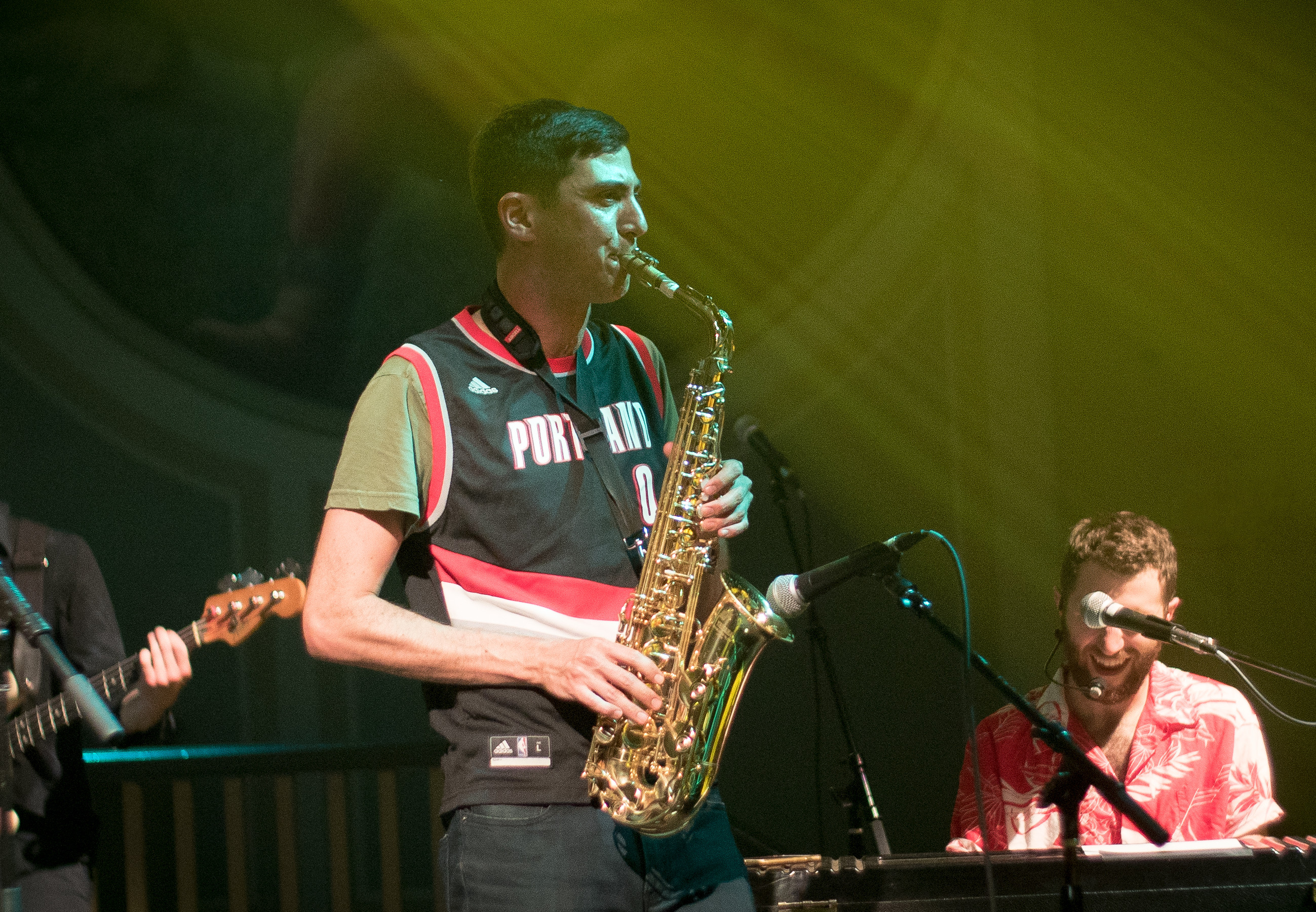
Dosik in 2017

In 2018, Dosik released his first full-length album Inside Voice and performed on the Jimmy Kimmel Show. An album review characterized the music as pop-soul. The album features contributions by Moses Sumney and Miguel Atwood-Ferguson. Dosik's work received recognition from Leon Bridges and Quincy Jones. He released the single "23 Teardrops" in 2020. His second full-length album The Nostalgiac was released in 2023.

== Personal life ==
Dosik is a Los Angeles Lakers fan and plays basketball. He wrote "Game Winner", the title track of his 2016 EP, while recovering from a basketball-related ACL injury. The EP's theme merges his love for music and basketball. He has performed the national anthem at several NBA games.

== Discography ==
Credits adapted from AllMusic and Bandcamp.

Studio albums

- Inside Voice (2018)
- The Nostalgiac (2023)

Extended plays

- Where Do They Come From? (2012)
- Game Winner (2016, reissue 2018)

Singles

- "Lakers Town (feat. Michael McBolton)" (2019)
- "23 Teardrops" (2020)
- "Emergency Landing (Live at United Recording)" (2020)
- "Do You Wanna Leave" (2026)

With Vulfpeck

- Vollmilch (2012)
- My First Car (2013)
- Thrill of the Arts (2015)
- The Beautiful Game (2016)
- Mr Finish Line (2017)
- Hill Climber (2018)
- Live at Madison Square Garden (2019)
- The Joy of Music, The Job of Real Estate (2020)
- Wong's Cafe (2022) with Cory Wong and Vulfpeck
- Schvitz (2022)
- Clarity of Cal (2025)
- MSG II (2025)

With others

- Dancethink (2009) with Ella Riot
- Off Center (2019) with Scary Pockets
- vol. 7 (2020) with stories
- vol. 9 (2020) with stories
- Hard Up (2021) with The Bamboos
