= Z (disambiguation) =

Z, or z, is the twenty-sixth and last letter of the English alphabet.

Z may also refer to:

== Film and television ==
- Z (1969 film), a 1969 Algerian-French thriller film based on the murder of a Greek politician
- Z (1999 film), a 1999 Indian mystery-thriller film (in Kannada language)
- Z (2019 film), a 2019 Canadian horror film
- Z movie, a description for low-budget films
- The Lost City of Z (film), 2017 biopic about explorer Percy Fawcett
- Project Z (film), Telugu language version of the science fiction thriller Maayavan
- Z-Cars, a British police procedural TV drama series
- Z-Gangsta (born 1958), later stage name for American actor and retired professional wrestler Tom Lister Jr.
- Z-Man, stage name for American professional wrestler Tom Zenk (1958–2017)
- Z: The Beginning of Everything, television series about the life of Zelda Fitzgerald
- Elizabeth "Z" Delgado, a Power Rangers: S.P.D. character
- Z, the production code for the 1966 Doctor Who serial The Gunfighters
- Z-4195, often called "Z", a worker ant, the protagonist of Antz
- Ultraman Z, a 2020 tokusatsu series
- World War Z (film), a 2013 zombie horror film
- Attack Force Z, a 1982 film

== Music ==
- Z (EP)
- Z (My Morning Jacket album)
- Z number, prefix for works of Henry Purcell in the Zimmerman catalog
- Project Z (band), band for which Jimmy Herring played
- WHTZ, or Z100, an iHeartRadio station in New York City
- "Z", a song by Gayle that was released in 2020
- "Z", a song by Zzbra from the album Zzbra: Original Motion Picture Soundtrack, 2012

== Literature ==
- "Z", a pseudonym of Ezra Pound
- Z: A Novel of Zelda Fitzgerald, by Therese Fowler
- Z, a novel by Vassilis Vassilikos
- Z, a play by Anne Szumigalski

== Mathematics ==
- Z-score, a concept in statistics
- zepto- (z), an SI prefix meaning 10^{−21}
- zetta- (Z), an SI prefix meaning 10^{21}
- $\mathbb{Z}$, the set of integer numbers
  - $\mathbb{Z}_n$ or $\mathbb{Z}/n\mathbb{Z}$, the set of all integers modulo n
  - $\mathbb{Z}_p$, the set of p-adic integers
- Z, symbol for plastic section modulus, a geometric property
- z-axis, part of the Cartesian coordinate system

== Computing ==
- .Z (disambiguation), a file extension
- Z (video game), a 1996 computer game
- Z notation, a specification language for computing systems
- z-buffering, the management of depth for 3-D graphics
- Z-machine, a virtual machine used by Infocom for text adventure games
- z/OS, a 64 bit operating system for mainframe computers
- Z or ZF or Z flag, designations for the zero flag register
- HP Z, a PC workstation brand of Hewlett Packard
- Z (high impedance), one of the states in three-state logic

== Natural sciences ==
- Z boson, an elementary particle
- Z, symbol for atomic number (the number of protons in an atom's nucleus)
- Z, symbol for compressibility factor (a thermodynamic property)
- Z, symbol for metallicity (the mass proportion of an astronomical object that is neither hydrogen nor helium)
- Partition function (statistical mechanics)
- Z, abbreviation for carboxybenzyl (an organic compound)
- $z$, the degree of redshift in astronomical spectroscopy
- (Z), a descriptor for stereoisomers with a double bond in chemical E–Z notation
- Z, the number of formula units per unit cell in a crystalline solid
- Z Pulsed Power Facility, an X-ray generator
- Z chromosome
- Haplogroup Z

== Transportation ==
- Z (New York City Subway service)
- Tokyo Metro Hanzōmon Line, a subway service operated by the Tokyo Metro, labeled
- , the official West Japan Railway Company service symbol for the Fukuen Line
- Honda Z, a kei car
- Honda Z series, a line of minibikes
- Nissan Z-car, a series of sports cars
- Kawasaki Z series, a series of motorcycles
- Lincoln Z, a mid-size luxury sedan
- HiPhi Z, an executive car
- BMW Z, a series of sports cars
- Garut, Tasikmalaya, Sumedang, Ciamis, Pangandaran and Banjar (vehicle registration prefix Z)

== Military ==
- Zulu, the military time zone code for UTC
- Z (military symbol), a symbol used by Russian military vehicles during the 2022 Russian invasion of Ukraine
- Operation Z, the Japanese code name for the 1941 attack on Pearl Harbor in its planning stages
- Operation Z (1944), the initial Japanese plan for the defense of the Marianas Islands in WWII
- Force Z, the British naval squadron sunk off Malaya in 1941
- Plan Z, a German naval construction program
- Class Z Reserve, contingent of the British Army
- Project Z (bomber project) of World War II Japan
- Z-4 Plan, a proposal to settle the Croatian War of Independence
- Hypothesis Z, a Romanian war plan for World War I

== Organisations ==
- Centre Party (Germany) (Zentrum), a political party in Germany
- Together (Serbia) (Zajedno), a political party in Serbia
- Z Energy, a New Zealand energy processing company
- Z Corporation, a computer printer company
- Z Communications, an activist media group, publishers of Z Magazine
- Z, a brand logo of Zed Books (a publishing company in London)
- Z, stock trading symbol for the Zillow Group

== People ==
- Zohran Mamdani (born 1991), American politician who was nicknamed "Z" as a child

== Other uses ==
- Z flag, one of the international maritime signal flags
- Z-plan castle, a form of castle design common in England and Scotland
- Z (cartoonist)
- Z (joke line), an American dial-a-joke service of the 1970s and 1980s
- Z scale, a 1:220 model railway scale
- z, the IPA symbol for a voiced alveolar sibilant sound
- Lost City of Z, a hypothetical ancient city in Brazil
- Z (underaged killer), placeholder designation of an unnamed 15-year-old minor who committed the 2001 murder of Annie Leong under the orders of her husband Anthony Ler in Singapore
- Suzanne "Z" Yang, American Girl character
- Z, the main antagonist of Xenoblade Chronicles 3
- Nikon Z-mount, an interchangeable lens mount developed by Nikon for its mirrorless digital cameras

== See also ==
- Wolfsangel, a Z-shaped symbol
- Ž, Ż, Ź, Ze (Cyrillic), Ezh and Ro (kana)
- Z with stroke, Ƶ character
- Big Z (disambiguation)
- Channel Z (disambiguation)
- Section Z, 1985 scrolling shooter video game
- Z Channel (disambiguation)
- Z Force (disambiguation)
- Z Plan (disambiguation)
- Zed (disambiguation)
- Zee (disambiguation)
- ZZ (disambiguation)
- Zzz (disambiguation)
- Zzzz (disambiguation)
