= ZZ =

ZZ or zz may refer to:

== Businesses and organisations ==
- Zhongzhi Capital or ZZ Capital, an asset management company
- Živi zid ("Human Shield"), a Croatian political party

== Games and sport ==
- ZZ Leiden, a Dutch basketball club
- ZZ method, in speedcubing
- ZZ scale, of model rail

== Music ==
- Z. Z. Hill (1935–1984), American blues singer
- ZZ Top, an American rock band
- ZZ Ward (born 1986), American blues rock singer
- "Zz", a silent track on the 2014 album Sleepify by Vulfpeck

== Science and mathematics ==
=== Astronomy ===
- ZZ Boötis, a star system in the constellation Boötes
- ZZ Ceti, a type of pulsating white dwarf star
- G 29-38 or ZZ Piscium, a variable white dwarf star

=== Molecular biology ===
- ZZ zinc finger, a type of protein domain
- ZZ, homogametic males under the ZW sex-determination system
- ZZ, homogametic males under the ZO sex-determination system

=== Other uses in science and mathematics ===
- Zamioculcas (or ZZ plant), a flowering plant genus
- ZZ diboson, in particle physics
- $\mathbb{Z}$, the Zahlen symbol for the set of integers

== Vehicles ==
- Isuzu Gemini ZZ/R, a subcompact car
- Tommykaira ZZ, a mid-engined sports car
- Toyota ZZ engine, a straight-4 piston engine series
- Kawasaki ZZ-R1200, a motorcycle

== Other uses ==
- Zz (digraph), in the Latin alphabet
- ZZ Packer (born 1973), American writer
- The War Games, a 1969 Doctor Who serial (production code: ZZ)

== See also ==
- Sleep (disambiguation)
- Z (disambiguation)
- Zzz (disambiguation)
- Zzzz (disambiguation)
- ZZR (disambiguation)
