= Operation Z =

Operation Z may refer to:

- Attack on Pearl Harbor, also known as Operation Z during its planning
- Operation Z (1944), a Japanese World War II plan for the defense of the Marianas Islands
- Russian invasion of Ukraine, also known as a "special military operation" using Z as a military symbol, and, thus, sometimes referred to as "Operation Z"

== See also ==
- Operation Zet
- Plan Z
- Project Z (disambiguation)
