= Zzz =

ZZZ, Zzz, zZz, or zzz most often refers to:

- zzz, a cross-linguistic onomatopoeia for snoring or sleeping
  - A series of Zs in a speech balloon, a comic book convention for snoring or sleeping

ZZZ, Zzz, zZz, or zzz may also refer to:

== Music ==
- zZz, a Dutch band from Amsterdam
- ZZZ, a 2018 album by Zion.T
- "ZZZ", a 2016 song by Empire of the Sun from the album Two Vines
- Zzz, a song produced by Kenichi Maeyamada performed by Sayaka Sasaki
- "Zzz", a silent track on the 2014 album Sleepify by Vulfpeck
- Zero Zero Zero, a 1998 compilation album by Sam Phillips

== Other uses ==
- Zenless Zone Zero (Chinese: 绝区零, romanized: Jué qū líng), 2024 video game developed by HoYoverse
- Union of Trade Unions (Związek Związków Zawodowych), a 1930s Polish trade union confederation
- Planet of the Spiders, a 1974 Doctor Who serial (production code ZZZ)
- Emoji U+1F634 😴 SLEEPING FACE
- Emoji U+1F4A4 💤 SLEEPING SYMBOL

== ZZZZ ==
- ZZZZ, the four-letter placeholder ICAO airport code
- Zzzz, the ISO 15924 code for uncoded script
- ZZZZ, a mid-2000s rock band including former members of the band Sweep the Leg Johnny
- "Zzzz", a silent track on the 2014 album Sleepify by Vulfpeck
- "ZzZz", a song on the 2019 studio album Reality in Black by Mamamoo
- "ZzZz", a song on the 2021 EP Hide & Seek by Purple Kiss

== Five or more Zs ==
- "ZZZZZ", a 1964 episode of The Outer Limits
- Zzzzzz (joke line), based in Los Angeles

== See also ==
- Z (disambiguation)
- ZZ (disambiguation)
