= Z machine =

Z machine may refer to:

- Z-machine, a text-based game interpreter
- Z Pulsed Power Facility, an x-ray generator at Sandia National Laboratories, informally known as the "Z machine"

== See also ==
- Z (disambiguation)
