= Silent album =

Silent album may refer to:

- Sleepify, a 2014 album by Vulfpeck
- Is This What We Want?, a 2025 album by 1,000+ various artists
