= ZZZ3 =

Protein found in humans

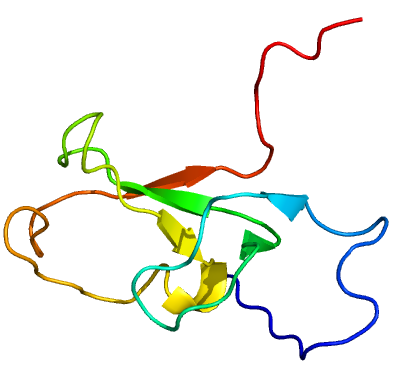

Identifiers
- Aliases: ZZZ3, ATAC1, zinc finger ZZ-type containing 3
- External IDs: MGI: 1920453; GeneCards: ZZZ3
Available structures
PDB	Ortholog search: PDBe RCSB
PDB	List of PDB id codes 2FC7, 2YUM

Gene location (Human)
Chr.	Chromosome 1 (human)
Band	1p31.1	Start	77,562,416 bp
Band	1p31.1	End	77,683,419 bp

Gene location (Mouse)
Chr.	Chromosome 3 (mouse)
Band	3|3 H3	Start	152,101,110 bp
Band	3|3 H3	End	152,168,463 bp
RNA expression pattern
Bgee	Human / Mouse (ortholog); Top expressed in: Achilles tendon; ventricular zone; germinal epithelium; epithelium of colon; tibia; amniotic fluid; islet of Langerhans; hair follicle; corpus callosum; parietal pleura / Top expressed in: genital tubercle; primitive streak; tail of embryo; Ileal epithelium; zygote; mandibular prominence; abdominal wall; sciatic nerve; maxillary prominence; epiblast; More reference expression data
BioGPS	n/a
Gene ontology
Molecular function	DNA binding; zinc ion binding; protein binding; metal ion binding; DNA-binding transcription factor activity, RNA polymerase II-specific
Cellular component	nucleolus; nucleus
Biological process	regulation of transcription, DNA-templated; transcription, DNA-templated; regulation of transcription by RNA polymerase II
Sources:Amigo / QuickGO
Orthologs
Databases	NCBI: entry; OMA: entry
Species	Human	Mouse
Entrez	26009	108946
Ensembl	ENSG00000036549	ENSMUSG00000039068
UniProt	Q8IYH5	Q6KAQ7
RefSeq (mRNA)	NM_001308237; NM_015534	NM_001080755; NM_001287139; NM_198416; NM_001346655; NM_001355673
RefSeq (protein)	NP_001295166; NP_056349; NP_001363075; NP_001363076; NP_001363077 NP_001363078; NP_001363080; NP_001363082; NP_001363083; NP_001363084; NP_001363085	NP_001074224; NP_001274068; NP_001333584; NP_001342602
Location (UCSC)	Chr 1: 77.56 – 77.68 Mb	Chr 3: 152.1 – 152.17 Mb
PubMed search
- Wikidata
View/Edit Human	View/Edit Mouse

ZZ-type zinc finger-containing protein 3 is a protein that in humans is encoded by the ZZZ3 gene. This protein is involved in histone binding and the regulation of cell division.

== See also ==
- ZZ zinc finger
