= HP ZBook =

Brand of mobile workstations

ZBook
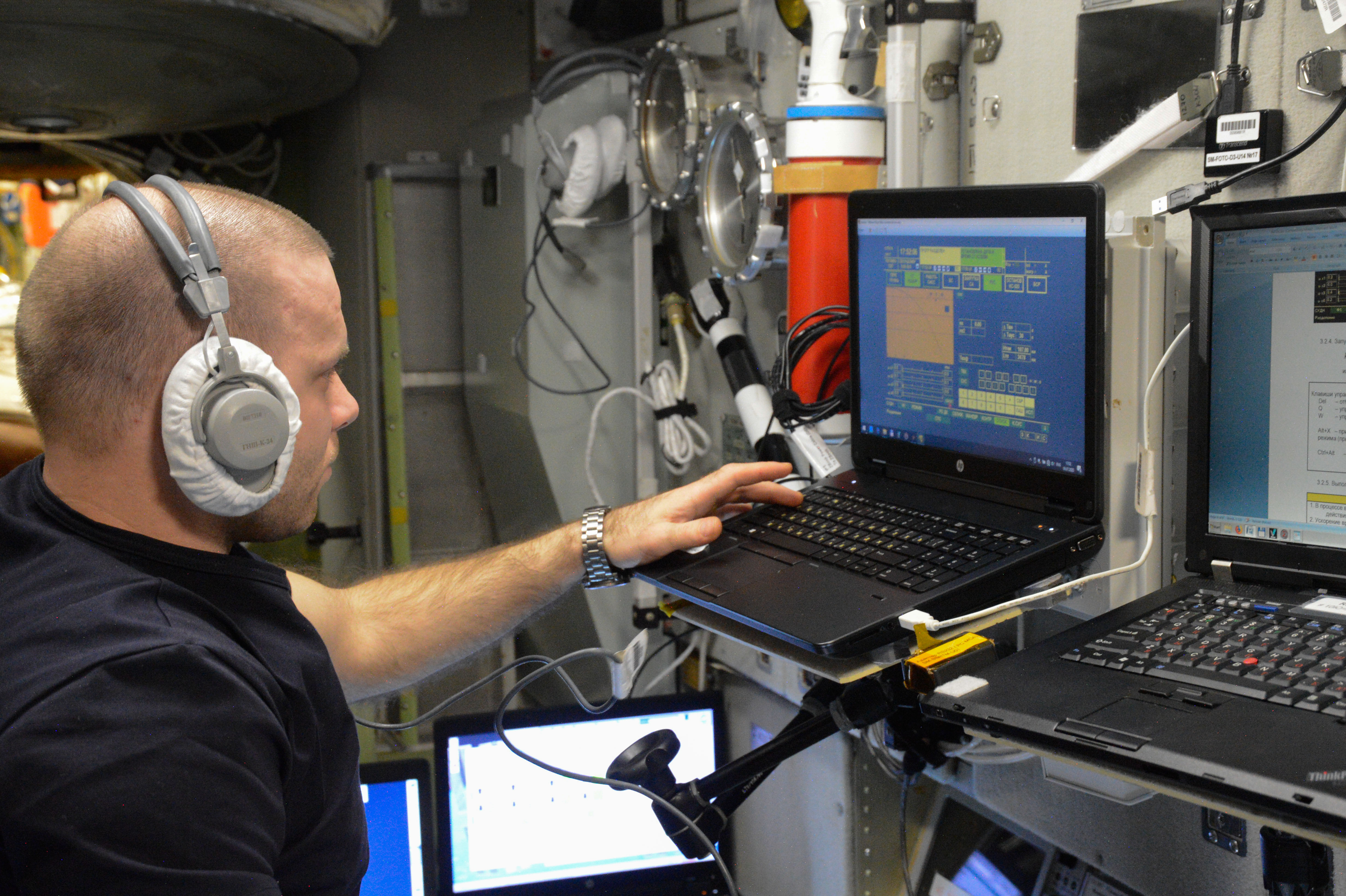
- The HP ZBook and the Lenovo ThinkPad on ISS (left and right)
- Developer: Hewlett-Packard (2013–2015); HP Inc. (2015–present)
- Type: Mobile workstation
- Released: September 10, 2013; 13 years ago
- CPU: AMD, Intel
- Display: Up to 17.3"
- Graphics: AMD, Nvidia, Intel
- Marketing target: Business
- Predecessor: EliteBook 8xxxw series
- Related: HP Z

HP ZBook is a lineup of mobile workstations designed, developed and marketed by HP Inc., and formerly by Hewlett-Packard from 2013 to 2015. Introduced in September 2013, as the portable variant of the HP Z workstations, it is a successor to HP's previous mobile workstations in the HP EliteBook series. The ZBook mainly competes against PCs such as ASUS' ProArt, Dell's Precision, and Lenovo's ThinkPad P series.

== Features ==
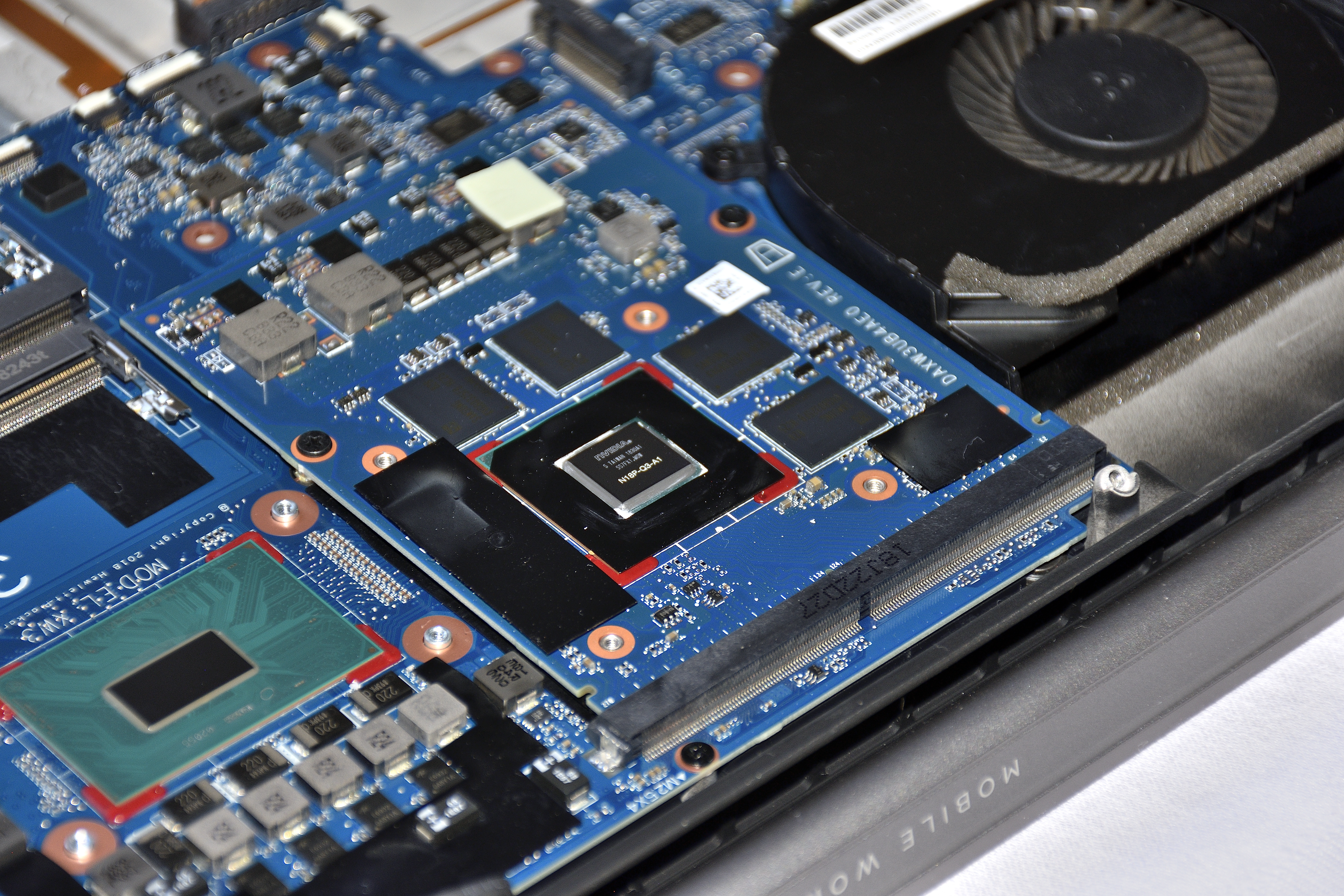
An Nvidia Quadro P2000 graphics board in the MXM configuration installed in an HP ZBook 17 G5.

The HP ZBook workstations feature Nvidia Quadro and AMD FirePro ISV-certified graphics cards and Thunderbolt connectivity. Display options include a touch-sensitive screen on the ZBook 14 and an HP DreamColor IPS panel on the ZBook 17. Additionally, a 3200×1800 resolution option has been announced for the ZBook 15.

== History ==
- 2013: September 10: ZBook 14, ZBook 15 and ZBook 17 announced.
- 2014: September 8: ZBook 15 G2 and ZBook 17 G2 announced.
- 2015: January 5: ZBook 14 G2 and ZBook 15u G2; November 11: ZBook 15u G3, ZBook Studio G3, ZBook 15 G3 and ZBook 17 G3 announced.
- 2017: April 21: ZBook 14u G4, ZBook 15u G4, ZBook Studio G4, ZBook 15 G4 and ZBook 17 G4; October 18: ZBook x2 G4 announced.
- 2018: February 7: ZBook 14u G5 and ZBook 15u G5; April 5: ZBook 15v G5, ZBook Studio G5, ZBook Studio x360 G5, ZBook 15 G5 and ZBook 17 G5 announced.
- 2019: April 16: ZBook 14u G6 and ZBook 15u G6; May 27: ZBook 15 G6 and ZBook 17 G6 announced.
- 2020: April 16: ZBook Create and ZBook Studio G7; May 26: ZBook Firefly 14 G7 and ZBook Firefly 15 G7 announced. September 1: ZBook Fury 15 G7, ZBook Fury 17 G7 and ZBook Power G7
- 2020 & 2021: December 7, 2020: ZBook Firefly 14 and 15 G8 launched. May 11, 2021: Announced ZBook Studio, Fury and Power G8.
- 2022: May 12: HP announced the G9 line-up including 4 members: Firefly, Studio, Power, and Fury.
- 2023: March 29: HP announced ZBook G10 laptops.
- 2024: March 27: HP announced ZBook G11 laptops.
- 2025: January 10: Announced ZBook Fury 18 G1i and ZBook Ultra 14 G1a. March 18: Announced ZBook 8 G1i/a and ZBook X G1i.

== Models ==
The last generations featured a more or less consistent naming scheme for different model categories. The "ZBook Firefly" line is the least powered category that is designed to be ultra-light and slim, powered by the Intel Core U or Intel Core P low-power CPUs and integrated graphics or entry-level dedicated graphics. The "ZBook Power" line is budget oriented with simple aesthetics and mid-level performance, featuring high-power Intel Core H CPUs and up to mid-range dedicated graphics. The "ZBook Studio" line is similarly performant to the latter due to its high-power Intel Core H CPUs but is more focussed on premium aesthetics and light and slim designs. More recently, they are even configurable with up to high-end dedicated graphics including non-workstation consumer-grade Nvidia GeForce GPUs (inherited from the previously existing "ZBook Create" line). The "ZBook Fury" line is the high-end brand for larger and highly upgradable mobile workstations with 4 memory slots and plentiful options for storage. Previously also featuring Intel Core H CPUs with up to high-end graphics, they now feature Intel Core HX CPUs since their release in 2022 offering desktop-level CPU performance.

Laptop color codes

Processor

Socketed desktop processor
Socketed mobile processor
Soldered high power processor
Soldered standard power processor
Soldered low power processor
Soldered ultra low power processor

Weight

0.9 kg (2.0 lb)	Up to 0.91 kg
1.0 kg (2.2 lb)	0.92–1.0 kg
1.1 kg (2.4 lb)	1.01–1.1 kg
1.2 kg (2.6 lb)	1.11–1.2 kg
1.3 kg (2.9 lb)	1.21–1.3 kg
1.4 kg (3.1 lb)	1.31–1.4 kg
1.5 kg (3.3 lb)	1.41–1.5 kg
1.6 kg (3.5 lb)	1.51–1.6 kg
1.7 kg (3.7 lb)	1.61–1.7 kg
1.8 kg (4.0 lb)	1.71–1.81 kg
1.9 kg (4.2 lb)	1.81–1.91 kg
2.0 kg (4.4 lb)	1.91–2.03 kg
2.1 kg (4.6 lb)	2.04–2.14 kg
2.3 kg (5.1 lb)	2.15–2.4 kg
2.5 kg (5.5 lb)	2.41–2.75 kg
2.8 kg (6.2 lb)	2.76–3.05 kg
3.1 kg (6.8 lb)	3.06–3.42 kg
3.5 kg (7.7 lb)	3.43–3.99 kg
4.0 kg (8.8 lb)	4.0–4.99 kg
5.5 kg (12 lb)	5.0–6.49 kg
7.2 kg (16 lb)	6.5–7.99 kg
9.1 kg (20 lb)	8.0–9.99 kg
10.7 kg (24 lb)	10–11.99 kg
12.7 kg (28 lb)	12–14.49 kg
14.5 kg (32 lb)	14.5–17.99 kg
18.1 kg (40 lb)	18–20.99 kg
21.7 kg (48 lb)	21–23.99 kg
24 kg (53 lb)	24–28.99 kg
29.5 kg (65 lb)	29 kg and above

Screen resolution

4K or higher
1440p+ (WQHD, QXGA)
1080p+ (Full HD, UXGA)
Better than 768p (SXGA,SXGA+)
600p+ (SVGA, HD, XGA, HD+)
Up to 600p (VGA)

Graphics

Dual standard socket graphics option
Dual proprietary socket graphics option
Standard socket graphics option
Proprietary socket graphics option
Soldered performance graphics option
Soldered midrange graphics option
Soldered mainstream graphics option
Soldered entry graphics option
Integrated entry graphics
Integrated basic graphics

Laptop storage combinations (excluding WWAN slot)

Level	PCIe 4.0 x4	PCIe 3.0 x4	PCIe 3.0 x2	M.2 SATA	mSATA	1.8" SATA	2.5" SATA	1.8" IDE	2.5" IDE
	2019; Not yet (laptops)	2013	2013	2013	2009	2003	2003	1991	1988
	3						2		
	4								
	3						1		
	2						2		
	3					2			
	3								
	2						1		
	4								
	3					1			
	2					2			
	2								
	1						1		
	3								
	2					1			
	1								
	2								
	1					1			
			2				1		
							4		
		1							
			1				1		
							3		
			1						
				1			1		
					1		1		
						1	1		
							2		
									3
						1			
							1		
									2
								1	
									1

Laptop memory

Amount	LPDDR5X	LPDDR5	DDR5	LPDDR4X	LPDDR4	DDR4	LPDDR3	DDR4	DDR3L		DDR3		DDR2		DDR	SDR	EDO	FPM
Amount						dual channel		< dual channel	dual channel	< dual channel	dual channel	< dual channel	dual channel	< dual channel				
Amount	2022 (laptops)	2019 (laptops)	2020	2017	2014	2014	2012	2014	2010		2007		2003		1998	1993	1993	1987
max memory = 512 GB	N/A	N/A	512 GB	N/A	N/A	N/A	N/A	N/A	N/A	N/A	N/A	N/A	N/A	N/A	N/A	N/A	N/A	N/A
max memory = 256 GB	N/A		256 GB (4 slots)	N/A	N/A	N/A	N/A	N/A	N/A	N/A	N/A	N/A	N/A	N/A	N/A	N/A	N/A	N/A
max memory = 128 GB	128 GB		128 GB	N/A	N/A	128 GB (4 slots)	N/A	N/A	N/A	N/A	N/A	N/A	N/A	N/A	N/A	N/A	N/A	N/A
64 GB ≤ max memory < 128 GB		64 GB		N/A	N/A	64 GB	N/A	64 GB (2 slots)	64 GB (4 slots)	N/A	N/A	N/A	N/A	N/A	N/A	N/A	N/A	N/A
32 GB ≤ max memory < 64 GB				32 GB	32 GB	32 GB	N/A		32 GB	32 GB (2 slots)	32 GB (4 slots)	N/A	N/A	N/A	N/A	N/A	N/A	N/A
16 GB ≤ max memory < 32 GB						16 GB	16 GB		16 GB		16 GB	16 GB (2 slots)	16 GB (4 slots)	N/A	N/A	N/A	N/A	N/A
8 GB ≤ max memory < 16 GB						8 GB			8 GB		8 GB		8 GB	8 GB (2 slots)	8 GB (4 slots)	N/A	N/A	N/A
4 GB ≤ max memory < 8 GB						4 GB			4 GB		4 GB		4 GB		4 GB	4 GB (4 slots)	4 GB (4 slots)	N/A
2 GB ≤ max memory < 4 GB						2 GB (8 chips)			2 GB		2 GB		2 GB			2 GB	2 GB	N/A
1 GB ≤ max memory < 2 GB			1 GB (1 chip)	dual channel min	dual channel min	N/A		single channel min	1 GB		1 GB		1 GB					1 GB (4 slots)
512 MB ≤ max memory < 1 GB	N/A	N/A	N/A	single channel min	single channel min	N/A	dual channel min	half channel min	512 MB (8 chips)		512 MB (8 chips)		512 MB					512 MB
256 MB ≤ max memory < 512 MB	N/A	N/A	N/A	256 MB (1 chip)	256 MB (1 chip)	N/A	single channel min	256 MB (1 chip)	N/A	single channel min	N/A	single channel min	256 MB					
128 MB ≤ max memory < 256 MB	N/A	N/A	N/A	N/A	N/A	N/A	128 MB (1 chip)	N/A	N/A	half channel min	N/A	half channel min						
64 MB ≤ max memory < 128 MB	N/A	N/A	N/A	N/A	N/A	N/A	N/A	N/A	N/A	64 MB (1 chip)	N/A	64 MB (1 chip)						
max memory < 64 MB	N/A	N/A	N/A	N/A	N/A	N/A	N/A	N/A	N/A	N/A	N/A	N/A						

=== First generation ===
The ZBook family originally comprised the following models:

- ZBook 14: 14.0" workstation Ultrabook
- ZBook 15: 15.6" workstation
- ZBook 17: 17.3" workstation

All models featured Intel Haswell dual- and quad-core processors, AMD or Nvidia professional graphics and up to 32 GB of RAM, except for the ZBook 14, which was limited to 16 GB of RAM.

The ZBook 15 and ZBook 17 use Intel Socket G3 except for the ZBook 14 which has the processor soldered-on.

==== Specifications ====
First generation (2013)
Model	Dimensions	Weight, min.	CPU	Chipset	Memory	Graphics	Storage	Networking	Audio	Screen	Webcam	Battery	Operating system
14	339 × 237 × 21 mm	1.59 kg (3.5 lb)	Intel Core Haswell i5-4200U (2C4T 1.6 GHz) or i5-4300U (vPro 2C4T 1.9 GHz) or i7-4500U (2C4T 1.8 GHz) or i7-4600U (vPro 2C4T 2.1 GHz)		up to 16 GB DDR3L-1600 (2 slots)	Intel HD 4400 optional AMD FirePro M4100 (1 GB GDDR5)	one M.2 2242 drive one 2.5" drive	Intel I218-LM Gigabit Ethernet; Intel Wireless-N 7260NB (802.11n) WLAN or Intel Wireless-N 7260AN (802.11n Bluetooth 4.0) WLAN or Intel Wireless-AC 7260 (802.11ac Bluetooth 4.0) WLAN optional HP hs3110 HSPA+ WWAN or HP lt4111 LTE/EV-DO/HSPA+ Gobi4G WWAN	DTS Studio Sound HD audio (Windows operating systems only) with integrated stereo speakers & microphone (dual-microphone array when equipped with optional webcam), button for volume mute, functions keys for volume up and down and combo microphonein/stereo headphone-out jack	14.0" WLED HD 300:1 200nits SVA or WLED HD+ 300:1 250nits SVA or WLED HD+ 300:1 250nits SVA touch or WLED FHD 600:1 300nits UWVA	optional 720p HD	24 Wh primary or 50 Wh; 60 Wh secondary	
15	381.5 × 257.0 × 30.5 mm	2.82 kg (6.2 lb)	Intel Core Haswell i5-4300M (2C4T 2.6 GHz vPro) or i5-4330M (2C4T 2.8 GHz vPro) or i7-4600M (2C4T 2.9 GHz vPro) or i7-4700MQ (4C8T 2.4 GHz) or i7-4800MQ (4C8T 2.7 GHz vPro) or i7-4900MQ (4C8T 2.8 GHz vPro)	Intel QM87	up to 32 GB DDR3L-1600 (4 slots)	Intel HD 4600; MXM slot, optional NVIDIA Quadro K610M (1 GB GDDR5) or Quadro K1100M (2 GB GDDR5) or Quadro K2100M (2 GB GDDR5)	one mSATA drive one 2.5" drive one optical drive	Intel I217-LM Gigabit Ethernet; Intel Centrino Advanced-N 6205 (802.11n) WLAN or Intel Centrino Advanced-N 6235 (802.11n Bluetooth 4.0) WLAN or Intel Wireless-N 7260AN (802.11n Bluetooth 4.0) WLAN or Intel Wireless-AC 7260 (802.11ac Bluetooth 4.0) WLAN optional HP hs3110 HSPA+ WWAN or HP lt4111 LTE/EV-DO/HSPA+ Gobi4G WWAN	15.6" WLED FHD 400:1 300nits SVA or WLED FHD 600:1 300nits UWVA or RGBLED FHD 800:1 210nits 10bits UWVA	83 Wh primary or 75 Wh Long Life; 73 Wh ST09 secondary or 100 Wh BB09	optional 720p HD		
17	416 mm × 272 mm × 34 mm	3.46 kg (7.6 lb)	All ZBook 15 options or i7-4930MX (4C8T 3.0 GHz vPro)	Intel QM87	up to 32 GB DDR3L-1600 (4 slots)	Intel HD 4600; MXM slot, optional NVIDIA Quadro K610M (1 GB GDDR5) or Quadro K3100M (4 GB GDDR5) or Quadro K4100M (4 GB GDDR5) or Quadro K5100M (8 GB GDDR5)	one mSATA drive two 2.5" drive one optical drive	Intel I217-LM Gigabit Ethernet; Intel Centrino Advanced-N 6205 (802.11n) WLAN or Intel Centrino Advanced-N 6235 (802.11n Bluetooth 4.0) WLAN or Intel Wireless-N 7260AN (802.11n Bluetooth 4.0) WLAN or Intel Wireless-AC 7260 (802.11ac Bluetooth 4.0) WLAN optional HP hs3110 HSPA+ WWAN or HP lt4111 LTE/EV-DO/HSPA+ Gobi4G WWAN	17.3" WLED HD+ 300:1 200nits SVA or WLED FHD 500:1 300nits WVA or RGBLED FHD 600:1 300nits 10bits UWVA	83 Wh primary or 75 Wh Long Life; 73 Wh ST09 secondary or 100 Wh BB09	optional 720p HD		

=== Second generation ===
The second generation comprised the following models:

- ZBook 14 G2: 14.0" workstation Ultrabook
- ZBook 15u G2: 15.6" workstation Ultrabook
- ZBook 15 G2: 15.6" workstation
- ZBook 17 G2: 17.3" workstation

The ZBook 15 G2 and ZBook 17 G2 models were announced in September 2014 and included new Intel processors, AMD and Nvidia graphics, and Thunderbolt 2 connectivity.

The ZBook 15 G2 and ZBook 17 G2 use Intel Socket G3 except for the ZBook 14 G2 and ZBook 15u G2 which have the processor soldered-on.

==== Specifications ====
Second generation (2014)
Model	Dimensions	Weight, min.	CPU	Chipset	Memory	Graphics	Storage	Networking	Audio	Screen	Webcam	Battery	Operating system
14 G2	339 × 237 × 21 mm (13.35 × 9.33 × 0.83 in)	1.71 kg (3.8 lb)	Intel Core Broadwell i5-5200U (2C4T 2.2 GHz) or i5-5300U (2C4T 2.3 GHz vPro) or i7-5500U (2C4T 2.4 GHz) or i7-5600U (2C4T 2.6 GHz vPro)		up to 32 GB DDR3L-1600 (2 slots)	Intel HD 5500 optional AMD FirePro M4150 FireGL (1 GB GDDR5)	one M.2 2242 drive one 2.5" drive	Intel I218-LM Gigabit Ethernet; Intel Wireless-AN 7265 (802.11n Bluetooth 4.0) WLAN or Intel Wireless-AC 3160 (802.11ac Bluetooth 4.0) WLAN or Intel Wireless-AC 7265 (802.11ac Bluetooth 4.0) WLAN optional HP hs3110 HSPA+ WWAN or HP lt4111 LTE/EV-DO/HSPA+ Gobi4G WWAN optional NXP NPC100 NFC	DTS Studio Sound (Windows operating systems only), integrated stereo speakers and integrated microphone (dual-microphone array when equipped with optional webcam), button for volume mute, functions keys for volume up and down and combo microphone-in/stereo headphone-out jack	14.0" WLED HD 300:1 200nits SVA or WLED HD+ 300:1 250nits SVA or WLED FHD 600:1 300nits UWVA or WLED FHD 600:1 300nits UWVA touch	optional 720p HD	50 Wh primary 60 Wh secondary	Windows 8.1 64; Windows 7 Professional 64 (available through downgrade rights from Windows 8.1 Pro); Windows 7 Professional 64; Ubuntu Linux; FreeDOS
15u G2	375.5 × 253.6 mm × 21.42 mm	1.91 kg (4.2 lb)	Intel Core Broadwell i5-5200U (2C4T 2.2 GHz) or i5-5300U (2C4T 2.3 GHz vPro) or i7-5500U (2C4T 2.4 GHz) or i7-5600U (2C4T 2.6 GHz vPro)		up to 32 GB DDR3L-1600 (2 slots)	Intel HD 5500 optional AMD FirePro M4170 FireGL (1 GB GDDR5)	one M.2 2242 drive one 2.5" drive	All ZBook 14 G2 options or Intel Wireless-NB 7265 (802.11n) WLAN		15.6" WLED FHD 400:1 300nits SVA or WLED FHD 600:1 300nits UWVA	optional 720p HD	50 Wh primary 60 Wh secondary	
15 G2	381.5 mm × 257.0 mm × 30.5 mm	2.78 kg (6.1 lb)	Intel Core Haswell i5-4210M (2C4T 2.6 GHz) or i5-4310M (2C4T 2.7 GHz vPro) or i5-4340M (2C4T 2.9 GHz vPro) or i7-4610M (2C4T 3.0 GHz vPro) or i7-4710MQ (4C8T 2.5 GHz) or i7-4810MQ (4C8T 2.8 GHz vPro) or i7-4910MQ (4C8T 2.9 GHz vPro)	Intel QM87	up to 32 GB DDR3L-1600 (4 slots)	Intel HD 4600; MXM slot, optional NVIDIA Quadro K610M (1 GB GDDR5) or Quadro K1100M (2 GB GDDR5) or Quadro K2100M (2 GB GDDR5) or AMD FirePro W5170M/W5100 (2 GB GDDR5)	one M.2 2260 drive one 2.5" drive one optical drive	Intel I217-LM Gigabit Ethernet; Intel Wireless-NB 7260 (802.11n) WLAN or Intel Wireless-AN 7260 (802.11n Bluetooth 4.0) WLAN or Intel Wireless-AC 7260 (802.11ac Bluetooth 4.0) WLAN optional HP hs3110 HSPA+ WWAN or HP lt4111 LTE/EV-DO/HSPA+ Gobi4G WWAN		15.6" WLED FHD 400:1 300nits SVA or WLED FHD 600:1 300nits UWVA or WLED QHD+ 600:1 300nits UWVA	optional 720p HD	83 Wh primary or 75 Wh Long Life; 73 Wh ST09 secondary or 100 Wh BB09	
17 G2	416 mm × 272 mm × 34 mm	3.36 kg (7.4 lb)	All ZBook 15 G2 options or i7-4940MX (4C8T 3.1 GHz vPro)	Intel QM87	up to 32 GB DDR3L-1600 (4 slots)	Intel HD 4600; MXM slot, optional AMD FirePro M6100 (2 GB GDDR5) or NVIDIA Quadro K1100M (2 GB GDDR5) or Quadro K2100M (2 GB GDDR5) or Quadro K3100M (4 GB GDDR5) or Quadro K4100M (4 GB GDDR5) or Quadro K5100M (8 GB GDDR5)	one M.2 2260 drive two 2.5" drive one optical drive	Intel I217-LM Gigabit Ethernet; Intel Wireless-NB 7260 (802.11n) WLAN or Intel Wireless-AN 7260 (802.11n Bluetooth 4.0) WLAN or Intel Wireless-AC 7260 (802.11ac Bluetooth 4.0) WLAN optional HP hs3110 HSPA+ WWAN or HP lt4111 LTE/EV-DO/HSPA+ Gobi4G WWAN		17.3" WLED HD+ 300:1 200nits SVA or WLED FHD 500:1 300nits WVA or RGBLED FHD 600:1 300nits 10bits UWVA	optional 720p HD	83 Wh primary or 75 Wh Long Life; 73 Wh ST09 secondary or 100 Wh BB09	

=== Third generation ===
The third generation comprised the following models:

- ZBook Studio G3: 15.6" workstation Ultrabook
- ZBook 15u G3: 15.6" workstation Ultrabook
- ZBook 15 G3: 15.6" workstation
- ZBook 17 G3: 17.3" workstation

All models were announced in November 2015. Features include Intel Skylake Core or Xeon E3-1500M v5 family processors, AMD FirePro and Nvidia Quadro graphics, and Thunderbolt 3. ZBook Studio G3 is the world's first quad core workstation Ultrabook. HP ZBook Dock with Thunderbolt 3 announced with those models can link up to 10 devices at once.

==== Specifications ====
Third generation (2015)
Model	Dimensions	Weight, min.	CPU	Chipset	Memory	Graphics	Storage	Networking	Audio	Screen	Webcam	Battery	Operating system
15u G3	383.3 × 257.7 mm × 19.9 mm	1.89 kg (4.2 lb)	Intel Core Skylake i5-6200U (2C4T 2.3 GHz) or i5-6300U (vPro 2C4T 2.4 GHz) or i7-6500U (2C4T 2.5 GHz) or i7-6600U (vPro 2C4T 2.6 GHz)		up to 64 GB DDR4-2133 (2 slots)	Intel HD 520 optional AMD Firepro W4190M (2 GB GDDR5)	one M.2 2280 drive one 2.5" drive	Intel I219-V Gigabit Ethernet or Intel I219-LM (vPro) Gigabit Ethernet; Intel Wireless-AC 3165 (802.11ac Bluetooth 4.0) WLAN or Intel Wireless-AC 8260 (802.11ac Bluetooth 4.2) WLAN optional HP hs3110 HSPA+ WWAN or HP lt4120 Qualcomm Snapdragon X5 LTE WWAN	Bang & Olufsen HD audio with integrated stereo speakers and microphone (dual-microphone array when equipped with optional webcam), button for volume mute, functions keys for volume up and down and combo microphone-in/stereo headphone-out jack	15.6" WLED FHD 400:1 300nits SVA or 15.6" WLED FHD 500:1 300nits SVA touch or 15.6" WLED FHD 600:1 300nits UWVA or 14.0" WLED UHD 400:1 270nits UWVA	optional 720p HD	46 Wh	
Studio G3	375 mm × 255 mm × 18 mm	2.00 kg (4.41 lb)	Intel Core Skylake i5-6300HQ (4C4T 2.3 GHz) or i5-6440HQ (vPro 4C4T 2.6 GHz) or i7-6700HQ (4C8T 2.6 GHz) or i7-6820HQ (vPro 4C8T 2.7 GHz) or Intel Xeon E3-1505M v5 (vPro ECC 4C8T 2.8 GHz) or Intel Xeon E3-1545M v5 (vPro ECC 4C8T 2.9 GHz)	Intel CM236	up to 64 GB DDR4-2133 non-ECC; 32 GB DDR4-2133 ECC (Xeon) (2 slots)	Intel HD 530 or Intel HD P530 (E3-1505M v5) or Intel Iris Pro P580 (E3-1545M v5) optional NVIDIA Quadro M1000M (4GB GDDR5)	two M.2 2280 drive	Intel I219-LM Gigabit Ethernet; Intel Wireless-AC 8260 (802.11ac Bluetooth 4.0) WLAN		15.6" WLED FHD 600:1 300nits UWVA or 15.6" WLED FHD 600:1 300nits UWVA touch or 15.6" WLED UHD 400:1 270nits UWVA or 15.6" WLED UHD 1000:1 270nits UWVA	optional 720p HD	64 Wh	
15 G3	386 mm × 264 mm × 26 mm	2.59 kg (5.7 lb)	Intel Core Skylake i5-6440HQ (vPro 4C4T 2.6 GHz) or i7-6700HQ (4C8T 2.6 GHz) or i7-6820HQ (vPro 4C8T 2.7 GHz) or Intel Xeon E3-1505M v5 (vPro ECC 4C8T 2.8 GHz) or Intel Xeon E3-1545M v5 (vPro ECC 4C8T 2.9 GHz)	Intel CM236	up to 64 GB DDR4-2133 non-ECC; 64 GB DDR4-2133 ECC (Xeon) (4 slots)	Intel HD 530 or Intel HD P530 (E3-1505M v5) or Intel Iris Pro P580 (E3-1545M v5); MXM slot, optional AMD FirePro W5170M (2 GB GDDR5) or NVIDIA Quadro M600M (2GB GDDR5) or Quadro M1000M (2GB GDDR5) or Quadro M2000M (4GB GDDR5)	two M.2 2280 drive one 2.5" drive	Intel Intel I219-LM Gigabit Ethernet; Intel Wireless-AC 8260 (802.11ac Bluetooth 4.2) WLAN optional HP hs3110 HSPA+ WWAN or HP lt4120 Qualcomm Snapdragon X5 LTE WWAN		15.6" WLED FHD 400:1 300nits SVA or 15.6" WLED FHD 600:1 300nits UWVA or 15.6" WLED FHD 600:1 300nits UWVA touch or 15.6" WLED UHD 1000:1 270nits UWVA	optional 720p HD	90 Wh	
17 G3	420 mm × 280 mm × 30 mm	3.00 kg (6.61 lb)	Intel Core Skylake i5-6300HQ (4C4T 2.3 GHz) or i5-6440HQ (vPro 4C4T 2.6 GHz) or i7-6700HQ (4C8T 2.6 GHz) or i7-6820HQ (vPro 4C8T 2.7 GHz) or Intel Xeon E3-1505M v5 (vPro ECC 4C8T 2.8 GHz) or Intel Xeon E3-1545M v5 (vPro ECC 4C8T 2.9 GHz)	Intel CM236	up to 64 GB DDR4-2133 non-ECC; 64 GB DDR4-2133 ECC (Xeon) (4 slots)	Intel HD 530 or Intel HD P530 (E3-1505M v5) or Intel Iris Pro P580 (E3-1545M v5); MXM slot, optional AMD FirePro W6150M (4 GB GDDR5) or NVIDIA Quadro M1000M (2GB GDDR5) or Quadro M2000M (4GB GDDR5) or Quadro M3000M (4GB GDDR5) or Quadro M4000M (4GB GDDR5) or Quadro M5000M (8GB GDDR5)	two M.2 2280 drive two 2.5" drive	Intel Intel I219-LM Gigabit Ethernet; Intel Wireless-AC 8260 (802.11ac Bluetooth 4.2) WLAN optional HP hs3110 HSPA+ WWAN or HP lt4120 Qualcomm Snapdragon X5 LTE WWAN		17.3" WLED HD+ 300:1 220nits SVA or 17.3" WLED FHD 600:1 300nits UWVA or 17.3" WLED FHD 600:1 300nits UWVA touch or 15.6" WLED UHD 1000:1 300nits UWVA	optional 720p HD	96 Wh	

=== Fourth generation ===
The following fourth-generation models are either discontinued or have been replaced by fifth-generation models:

- ZBook x2 G4: 14.0" workstation with detachable keyboard (2-in-1). Has similar performance specification to the 14u.
- ZBook 14u G4: 14.0" workstation Ultrabook
- ZBook Studio G4: 15.6" workstation Ultrabook
- ZBook 15u G4: 15.6" workstation Ultrabook
- ZBook 15 G4: 15.6" workstation
- ZBook 17 G4: 17.3" workstation

All models featured Intel Kaby Lake dual- and quad-core processors, AMD and Nvidia professional graphics, up to 64 GB of RAM, and Thunderbolt 3. The ZBook 14u and 15u feature a mixture of dual-core Kaby Lake and quad-core Intel eighth-generation Kaby Lake R processors.

==== Specifications ====
Fourth generation (2016/2017)
Model	Dimensions	Weight, min.	CPU	Chipset	Memory	Graphics	Storage	Networking	Audio	Screen	Webcam	Battery	Operating system
x2 G4	Laptop mode 364.5 × 227 × 20.3 mm (0.75 × 14.35 × 8.94 in); Tablet mode 364.5 × 227 × 14.6 mm (0.53 × 14.35 × 8.94 in)	2.17 kg (4.8 lb) (laptop mode) 1.65 kg (3.6 lb) (tablet mode)	Intel Core Kaby Lake i7-7500U (2C4T 2.7 GHz) or i7-7600U (vPro 2C4T 2.8 GHz)		up to 64 GB DDR4-2133 (2 slots)	Intel HD Graphics 620 with optional NVIDIA Quadro M620 (2 GB GDDR5)	one M.2 2280 drive	Intel Wireless-AC 8265 (802.11ac Bluetooth 4.2) WLAN optional NXP NPC100 NFC	Bang & Olufsen & HD audio with dual stereo speakers, dual array digital microphone, functions keys for volume up and down and combo microphone/headphone	14.0" WLED UHD 1000:1 300nits UWVA touch or WLED UHD 1000:1 300nits UWVA 10-bit (8+2 FRC) touch	720 HD with IR Front; 8 MP 1080P FHD Rear	70 Wh	
x2 G4	Laptop mode 364.5 × 227 × 20.3 mm (0.75 × 14.35 × 8.94 in); Tablet mode 364.5 × 227 × 14.6 mm (0.53 × 14.35 × 8.94 in)	2.17 kg (4.8 lb) (laptop mode) 1.65 kg (3.6 lb) (tablet mode)	Intel Core Kaby Lake R i5-8250U (4C8T 1.6 GHz) or i5-8550U (4C8T 1.8 GHz) or i7-8650U (vPro 4C8T 1.9 GHz)		up to 64 GB DDR4-2133 (2 slots)	Intel HD Graphics 620 with optional NVIDIA Quadro M620 (2 GB GDDR5)	one M.2 2280 drive	Intel Wireless-AC 8265 (802.11ac Bluetooth 4.2) WLAN optional NXP NPC100 NFC	Bang & Olufsen & HD audio with dual stereo speakers, dual array digital microphone, functions keys for volume up and down and combo microphone/headphone	14.0" WLED UHD 1000:1 300nits UWVA touch or WLED UHD 1000:1 300nits UWVA 10-bit (8+2 FRC) touch	720 HD with IR Front; 8 MP 1080P FHD Rear	70 Wh	
14u G4	337.8 mm × 236.2 mm × 22.1 mm	1.64 kg (3.6 lb)	Intel Core Kaby Lake i5-7200U (2C4T 2.5 GHz) or i5-7300U (vPro 2C4T 2.6 GHz) or i7-7500U (2C4T 2.7 GHz) or i7-7600U (vPro 2C4T 2.8 GHz)		up to 64 GB DDR4-2133 (2 slots)	Intel HD 620 optional AMD FirePro W4190M (2 GB GDDR5)	one M.2 2280 drive one 2.5" drive	Intel I219-V Gigabit Ethernet or Intel I219-LM (vPro) Gigabit Ethernet; Intel Wireless-AC 3168 (802.11ac Bluetooth 4.2) WLAN or Intel Wireless-AC 8265 (802.11ac Bluetooth 4.2) WLAN optional HP hs3210 HSPA+ WWAN or HP lt4120 Qualcomm Snapdragon X5 LTE WWAN or HP It4132 LTE/HSPA+ 4G WWAN optional NXP NPC100 NFC	14.0" WLED HD 300:1 220nits SVA or WLED FHD 300:1 300nits SVA or WLED FHD 300:1 300nits SVA touch or WLED FHD 600:1 3400nits UWVA	720p HD	51 Wh		
15u G4	383.3 mm × 257.7 mm × 19.9 mm	1.9 kg (4.2 lb)	Intel Core Kaby Lake i5-7200U (2C4T 2.5 GHz) or i5-7300U (vPro 2C4T 2.6 GHz) or i7-7500U (2C4T 2.7 GHz) or i7-7600U (vPro 2C4T 2.8 GHz)		up to 64 GB DDR4-2133 (2 slots)	Intel HD 620 optional AMD FirePro W4190M (2 GB GDDR5)	one M.2 2280 drive one 2.5" drive	Intel I219-V Gigabit Ethernet or Intel I219-LM (vPro) Gigabit Ethernet; Intel Wireless-AC 3168 (802.11ac Bluetooth 4.2) WLAN or Intel Wireless-AC 8265 (802.11ac Bluetooth 4.2) WLAN optional HP hs3210 HSPA+ WWAN or HP lt4120 Qualcomm Snapdragon X5 LTE WWAN or HP It4132 LTE/HSPA+ 4G WWAN optional NXP NPC100 NFC		720p HD	51 Wh	15.6" WLED FHD 400:1 300nits SVA or WLED FHD 500:1 300nits SVA touch or WLED FHD 600:1 300nits UWVA or WLED UHD 1000:1 3400nits UWVA	
Studio G4	375 mm × 255 mm × 18 mm	2.09 kg (4.6 lb)	Intel Core Kaby Lake i5-7300HQ (4C4T 2.5 GHz) or i5-7440HQ (vPro 4C4T 2.8 GHz) or i7-7700HQ (4C8T 2.8 GHz) or i7-7820HQ (vPro 4C8T 2.9 GHz) or Intel Xeon E3-1505M v6 (vPro ECC 4C8T 3.0 GHz) or Intel Xeon E3-1535M v6 (vPro ECC 4C8T 3.1 GHz)	Intel CM238	up to 64 GB DDR4-2133 non-ECC; 32 GB DDR4-2133 ECC (Xeon) (2 slots)	Intel HD 630 or Intel HD P630 (Xeon) optional NVIDIA Quadro M1200M (4 GB GDDR5)	two M.2 2280 drive or one M.2 with 92 Wh battery	Intel I219-LM Gigabit Ethernet; Intel Wireless-AC 8265 (802.11ac Bluetooth 4.2) WLAN		720p HD	15.6" WLED FHD 600:1 300nits UWVA or WLED FHD 600:1 300nits UWVA touch or WLED UHD 400:1 270nits UWVA or WLED UHD 1000:1 270nits UWVA	64 Wh or 92 Wh	
15 G4	386.1 mm × 264.2 mm × 25.4 mm	2.60 kg (5.7 lb)	Intel Core Kaby Lake i5-7300HQ (4C4T 2.5 GHz) or i5-7440HQ (vPro 4C4T 2.8 GHz) or i7-7700HQ (4C8T 2.8 GHz) or i7-7820HQ (vPro 4C8T 2.9 GHz) or Intel Xeon E3-1505M v6 (vPro ECC 4C8T 3.0 GHz) or Intel Xeon E3-1535M v6 (vPro ECC 4C8T 3.1 GHz)	Intel CM238	up to 64 GB DDR4-2400 non-ECC; 64 GB DDR4-2400 ECC (Xeon) (4 slots)	Intel HD 630 or Intel HD P630 (Xeon); MXM slot, optional AMD RadeonPro WX 4150 (4 GB GDDR5) or NVIDIA Quadro M620 (2GB GDDR5) or Quadro M1200 (4GB GDDR5) or Quadro M2200 (4GB GDDR5)	two M.2 2280 drive one 2.5" drive	Intel Intel I219-LM Gigabit Ethernet; Intel Wireless-AC 8265 (802.11ac Bluetooth 4.2) WLAN optional HP hs3210 HSPA+ WWAN or HP lt4120 Qualcomm Snapdragon X5 LTE WWAN or HP It4132 LTE/HSPA+ 4G WWAN		720p HD	15.6" WLED FHD 400:1 300nits SVA or WLED FHD 600:1 300nits UWVA or WLED FHD 600:1 300nits UWVA touch or WLED UHD 1000:1 270nits UWVA	90 Wh	
17 G4	419.1 mm × 279.4 mm × 33 mm	3.14 kg (6.9 lb)	Intel Core Kaby Lake i5-7300HQ (4C4T 2.5 GHz) or i5-7440HQ (vPro 4C4T 2.8 GHz) or i7-7700HQ (4C8T 2.8 GHz) or i7-7820HQ (vPro 4C8T 2.9 GHz) or Intel Xeon E3-1505M v6 (vPro ECC 4C8T 3.0 GHz) or Intel Xeon E3-1535M v6 (vPro ECC 4C8T 3.1 GHz)	Intel CM238	up to 64 GB DDR4-2400 non-ECC; 64 GB DDR4-2400 ECC (Xeon) (4 slots)	Intel HD 630 or Intel HD P630 (Xeon); MXM slot, optional AMD RadeonPro WX 4170 (4 GB GDDR5) or NVIDIA Quadro M1200 (4GB GDDR5) or Quadro M2200 (4GB GDDR5) or Quadro P3000 (6GB GDDR5) or Quadro P4000 (8GB GDDR5) or Quadro P5000 (16GB GDDR5)	two M.2 2280 drive two 2.5" drive	Intel Intel I219-LM Gigabit Ethernet; Intel Wireless-AC 8265 (802.11ac Bluetooth 4.2) WLAN optional HP hs3210 HSPA+ WWAN or HP lt4120 Qualcomm Snapdragon X5 LTE WWAN or HP It4132 LTE/HSPA+ 4G WWAN		720p HD	17.3" WLED HD+ 300:1 220nits SVA or WLED FHD 600:1 300nits UWVA or WLED FHD 600:1 300nits UWVA touch or WLED UHD 1000:1 300nits UWVA	96 Wh	

=== Fifth generation ===
The following fifth-generation models are either discontinued or have been replaced by sixth-generation models:

- ZBook 14u G5: 14.0" workstation Ultrabook
- ZBook 15u G5: 15.6" workstation Ultrabook
- ZBook Studio G5: 15.6" workstation targeted at creative industry. Prioritises higher display specifications (colour gamut, resolution etc.).
- ZBook Studio x360 G5: 15.6" convertible workstation. Similar to the Studio G5, but with a 360 degree hinge, and the option for a touchscreen.
- ZBook 15v G5: 15.6" workstation with a lower price point than the 15, but with similar features and performance to the 15.
- ZBook 15 G5: 15.6" workstation
- ZBook 17 G5: 17.3" workstation

==== Specifications ====
Fifth generation (2018)
Model	Dimensions	Weight, min.	CPU	Chipset	Memory	Graphics	Storage	Networking	Audio	Screen	Webcam	Battery	Operating system
14u G5	326.14 × 234.19 mm × 18.03 mm	1.48 kg (3.3 lb)	Intel Core Kaby Lake i5-7200U (2C4T 2.5 GHz) or i5-7300U (vPro 2C4T 2.6 GHz) or i7-7500U (2C4T 2.7 GHz) or i7-7600U (vPro 2C4T 2.8 GHz)		up to 64 GB DDR4-2400 (2 slots)	Intel HD 620 optional AMD Radeon Pro WX 3100 (2 GB GDDR5)	one M.2 2280 drive	Intel I219-V Gigabit Ethernet or Intel I219-LM (vPro) Gigabit Ethernet; Intel Wireless-AC 8265 (802.11ac Bluetooth 4.2) WLAN optional HP hs3210 HSPA+ WWAN or HP lt4120 Qualcomm Snapdragon X5 LTE WWAN or HP It4132 LTE/HSPA+ 4G WWAN optional NXP NPC100 NFC	HP tuned Bang & Olufsen with dual stereo speakers, HP world-facing microphone with dual array digital microphone, functions keys for volume up and down, combo microphone/headphone jack and HD audio	14.0" WLED HD 300:1 220nits SVA or 14.0" WLED FHD 300:1 300nits SVA or 14.0" WLED FHD 300:1 300nits SVA touch or 14.0" WLED FHD 600:1 340nits UWVA	optional 720P HD or 720P HD with IR	50Wh	Windows 10 Pro 64
14u G5	326.14 × 234.19 mm × 18.03 mm	1.48 kg (3.3 lb)	Intel Core Kaby Lake R i5-8250U (4C8T 1.6 GHz) or i5-8350U (vPro 4C8T 1.7 GHz) or i7-8550U (4C8T 1.8 GHz) or i7-8650U (vPro 4C8T 1.9 GHz)		up to 64 GB DDR4-2400 (2 slots)	Intel UHD 620 optional AMD Radeon Pro WX 3100 (2 GB GDDR5)	one M.2 2280 drive	Intel I219-V Gigabit Ethernet or Intel I219-LM (vPro) Gigabit Ethernet; Intel Wireless-AC 8265 (802.11ac Bluetooth 4.2) WLAN optional HP hs3210 HSPA+ WWAN or HP lt4120 Qualcomm Snapdragon X5 LTE WWAN or HP It4132 LTE/HSPA+ 4G WWAN optional NXP NPC100 NFC	HP tuned Bang & Olufsen with dual stereo speakers, HP world-facing microphone with dual array digital microphone, functions keys for volume up and down, combo microphone/headphone jack and HD audio	14.0" WLED HD 300:1 220nits SVA or 14.0" WLED FHD 300:1 300nits SVA or 14.0" WLED FHD 300:1 300nits SVA touch or 14.0" WLED FHD 600:1 340nits UWVA	optional 720P HD or 720P HD with IR	50Wh	
15u G5	370.8 mm × 251 mm × 18.25 mm	1.77 kg (3.9 lb)	All ZBook 14u G5 Kaby Lake options		up to 64 GB DDR4-2400 (2 slots)	All ZBook 14u G5 Kaby Lake options	one M.2 2280 drive	Intel I219-V Gigabit Ethernet or Intel I219-LM (vPro) Gigabit Ethernet; Intel Wireless-AC 8265 (802.11ac Bluetooth 4.2) WLAN optional HP hs3210 HSPA+ WWAN or HP lt4120 Qualcomm Snapdragon X5 LTE WWAN or HP It4132 LTE/HSPA+ 4G WWAN optional NXP NPC100 NFC		15.6" WLED FHD 600:1 220nits UWVA 67%sRGB or 15.6" WLED FHD 600:1 220nits UWVA 67%sRGB touch or 15.6" WLED FHD 600:1 400nits UWVA 100%sRGB or 15.6" WLED FHD 120 Hz 600:1 650nits SureView 100%sRGB or 15.6" WLED UHD 1200:1 400nits UWVA 100%sRGB		56Wh	
15u G5	370.8 mm × 251 mm × 18.25 mm	1.77 kg (3.9 lb)	All ZBook 14u G5 Kaby Lake R options		up to 64 GB DDR4-2400 (2 slots)	All ZBook 14u G5 Kaby Lake R options	one M.2 2280 drive	Intel I219-V Gigabit Ethernet or Intel I219-LM (vPro) Gigabit Ethernet; Intel Wireless-AC 8265 (802.11ac Bluetooth 4.2) WLAN optional HP hs3210 HSPA+ WWAN or HP lt4120 Qualcomm Snapdragon X5 LTE WWAN or HP It4132 LTE/HSPA+ 4G WWAN optional NXP NPC100 NFC		15.6" WLED FHD 600:1 220nits UWVA 67%sRGB or 15.6" WLED FHD 600:1 220nits UWVA 67%sRGB touch or 15.6" WLED FHD 600:1 400nits UWVA 100%sRGB or 15.6" WLED FHD 120 Hz 600:1 650nits SureView 100%sRGB or 15.6" WLED UHD 1200:1 400nits UWVA 100%sRGB		56Wh	
15v G5	256.5 mm × 365 mm × 25.4 mm	2.14 kg (4.7 lb)	Intel Core Coffee Lake i5-8300H (4C8T 2.3 GHz) or i5-8400H (vPro 4C8T 2.5 GHz) or i7-8750H (6C12T 2.2 GHz) or i7-8850H (vPro 6C12T 2.6 GHz) or Xeon E-2176M (vPro ECC 6C12T 2.7 GHz)	Intel CM246	up to 64 GB DDR4-2667 non-ECC or 32 GB DDR4-2667 ECC (Xeon) (2 slots)	Intel UHD 630 or Intel UHD P630 (Xeon) optional NVIDIA Quadro P600 (4 GB GDDR5)	one M.2 2280 drive one 2.5" drive	Intel I219-LM Gigabit Ethernet; Intel Wireless-AC 9560 (802.11ac Bluetooth 5.0) WLAN		15.6" WLED FHD 600:1 220nits UWVA 67%sRGB or 15.6" WLED FHD 600:1 220nits UWVA 67%sRGB touch or 15.6" WLED UHD 1000:1 340nits UWVA 100%sRGB	optional 720P HD or 1080P FHD with IR	52.5 Wh or 70 Wh	
15v G5	256.5 mm × 365 mm × 25.4 mm	2.14 kg (4.7 lb)	Intel Core Coffee Lake R i5-9300H (4C8T 2.4 GHz) or i7-9750H (6C12T 2.6 GHz) or i7-9850H (vPro 6C12T 2.6 GHz) or i9-9880H (vPro 8C16T 2.3 GHz)	Intel CM246	up to 64 GB DDR4-2667 non-ECC or 32 GB DDR4-2667 ECC (Xeon) (2 slots)	Intel UHD 630 or Intel UHD P630 (Xeon) optional NVIDIA Quadro P600 (4 GB GDDR5)	one M.2 2280 drive one 2.5" drive	Intel I219-LM Gigabit Ethernet; Intel Wireless-AC 9560 (802.11ac Bluetooth 5.0) WLAN		15.6" WLED FHD 600:1 220nits UWVA 67%sRGB or 15.6" WLED FHD 600:1 220nits UWVA 67%sRGB touch or 15.6" WLED UHD 1000:1 340nits UWVA 100%sRGB	optional 720P HD or 1080P FHD with IR	52.5 Wh or 70 Wh	
Studio G5	359.9 mm × 245.1 mm × 18.8 mm	1.99 kg (4.4 lb)	Intel Core Coffee Lake i5-8300H (4C8T 2.3 GHz) or i5-8400H (vPro 4C8T 2.5 GHz) or i7-8750H (6C12T 2.2 GHz) or i7-8850H (vPro 6C12T 2.6 GHz) or i7-8950HK (6C12T 2.9 GHz) or Xeon E-2176M (vPro ECC 6C12T 2.7 GHz) or Xeon E-2186M (vPro ECC 6C12T 2.9 GHz)	Intel CM246	up to 64 GB DDR4-2667 non-ECC or 32 GB DDR4-2667 ECC (Xeon) (2 slots)	Intel UHD 630 or Intel UHD P630 (Xeon) optional NVIDIA Quadro P1000 (4 GB GDDR5) or NVIDIA Quadro P2000 (4 GB GDDR5)	two M.2 2280 drive one 2.5" drive	Intel Wireless-AC 9560 (802.11ac Bluetooth 5.0) WLAN optional WNC XRAV-1 (NXP NPC300) NFC		15.6" WLED FHD 600:1 400nits UWVA 72%NTSC or 15.6" WLED FHD 600:1 650nits UWVA 72%NTSC 120 Hz SureView or 15.6" WLED UHD 1200:1 400nits UWVA 72%NTSC or 15.6" WLED UHD 1200:1 600nits UWVA 100%AdobeRGB 10(8+2)bit DreamColor	optional 720P HD or 720P HD with IR	64Wh or 96Wh	
Studio G5	359.9 mm × 245.1 mm × 18.8 mm	1.99 kg (4.4 lb)	Intel Core Coffee Lake R i7-9750H (6C12T 2.6 GHz) or i7-9850H (vPro 6C12T 2.6 GHz) or i9-9880H (vPro 8C16T 2.3 GHz) or i9-9980HK (8C16T 2.4 GHz)	Intel CM246	up to 64 GB DDR4-2667 non-ECC or 32 GB DDR4-2667 ECC (Xeon) (2 slots)	Intel UHD 630 or Intel UHD P630 (Xeon) optional NVIDIA Quadro P1000 (4 GB GDDR5) or NVIDIA Quadro P2000 (4 GB GDDR5)	two M.2 2280 drive one 2.5" drive	Intel Wireless-AC 9560 (802.11ac Bluetooth 5.0) WLAN optional WNC XRAV-1 (NXP NPC300) NFC		15.6" WLED FHD 600:1 400nits UWVA 72%NTSC or 15.6" WLED FHD 600:1 650nits UWVA 72%NTSC 120 Hz SureView or 15.6" WLED UHD 1200:1 400nits UWVA 72%NTSC or 15.6" WLED UHD 1200:1 600nits UWVA 100%AdobeRGB 10(8+2)bit DreamColor	optional 720P HD or 720P HD with IR	64Wh or 96Wh	
Studio x360 G5	360 mm × 245.1 mm × 20.3 mm	2.26 kg (5.0 lb)	All ZBook Studio G5 Coffee Lake options	Intel CM246	up to 64 GB DDR4-2667 non-ECC or 32 GB DDR4-2667 ECC (Xeon) (2 slots)	Intel UHD 630 or Intel UHD P630 (Xeon) optional NVIDIA Quadro P1000 (4 GB GDDR5) or NVIDIA Quadro P2000 (4 GB GDDR5)	two M.2 2280 drive one 2.5" drive	Intel Wireless-AC 9560 (802.11ac Bluetooth 5.0) WLAN optionalIntel XMM 7360 LTE-Advanced WWAN or HP lt4132 LTE/HSPA+ 4G WWAN optional WNC XRAV-1 (NXP NPC300) NFC		15.6" WLED FHD 600:1 400nits UWVA 72%NTSC touch or 15.6" WLED FHD 600:1 650nits UWVA 72%NTSC 120 Hz SureView touch or 15.6" WLED UHD 1200:1 400nits UWVA 72%NTSC touch or 15.6" WLED UHD 1200:1 600nits UWVA 100%AdobeRGB 10(8+2)bit DreamColor touch	optional 720P HD or 720P HD with IR	64Wh or 96Wh	
Studio x360 G5	360 mm × 245.1 mm × 20.3 mm	2.26 kg (5.0 lb)	All ZBook Studio G5 Coffee Lake R options	Intel CM246	up to 64 GB DDR4-2667 non-ECC or 32 GB DDR4-2667 ECC (Xeon) (2 slots)	Intel UHD 630 or Intel UHD P630 (Xeon) optional NVIDIA Quadro P1000 (4 GB GDDR5) or NVIDIA Quadro P2000 (4 GB GDDR5)	two M.2 2280 drive one 2.5" drive	Intel Wireless-AC 9560 (802.11ac Bluetooth 5.0) WLAN optionalIntel XMM 7360 LTE-Advanced WWAN or HP lt4132 LTE/HSPA+ 4G WWAN optional WNC XRAV-1 (NXP NPC300) NFC		15.6" WLED FHD 600:1 400nits UWVA 72%NTSC touch or 15.6" WLED FHD 600:1 650nits UWVA 72%NTSC 120 Hz SureView touch or 15.6" WLED UHD 1200:1 400nits UWVA 72%NTSC touch or 15.6" WLED UHD 1200:1 600nits UWVA 100%AdobeRGB 10(8+2)bit DreamColor touch	optional 720P HD or 720P HD with IR	64Wh or 96Wh	
15 G5	375.9 mm × 264.16 mm × 25.4 mm	2.6 kg (5.7 lb)	All ZBook Studio G5 Coffee Lake options	Intel CM246	up to 128 GB DDR4-2667 non-ECC or 64 GB DDR4-2667 ECC (Xeon) (4 slots)	Intel UHD 630 or Intel UHD P630 (Xeon) optional AMD RadeonPro WX 4150 (4 GB GDDR5) or NVIDIA Quadro P1000 (4 GB GDDR5) or Quadro P2000 (4 GB GDDR5)	two M.2 2280 drive one 2.5" drive	Intel Intel I219-LM Gigabit Ethernet; Intel Wireless-AC 9560 (802.11ac Bluetooth 5.0) WLAN optional Intel XMM 7360 LTE-Advanced WWAN or HP lt4132 LTE/HSPA+ 4G WWAN optional WNC XRAV-1 (NXP NPC300) NFC		15.6" WLED FHD 600:1 220nits UWVA 65%sRGB or 15.6" WLED FHD 600:1 400nits UWVA 100%sRGB or 15.6" WLED FHD 600:1 650nits UWVA 100%sRGB 120 Hz touch or 15.6" WLED UHD 1200:1 400nits UWVA or 15.6" WLED UHD 1200:1 400nits UWVA 100%sRGB touch or 15.6" WLED UHD 1200:1 600nits UWVA 100%AdobeRGB 10(8+2)bit DreamColor	optional 720P HD or 720P HD with IR	90 Wh	
17 G5	416 mm × 288 mm × 33.5 mm	3.2 kg (7.1 lb)	All ZBook Studio G5 Coffee Lake options	Intel CM246	up to 128 GB DDR4-2667 non-ECC or 64 GB DDR4-2667 ECC (Xeon) (4 slots)	Intel UHD 630 or Intel UHD P630 (Xeon); MXM slot, optional AMD RadeonPro WX 4170 (4 GB GDDR5) or NVIDIA Quadro P1000 (4 GB GDDR5) or Quadro P2000 (4 GB GDDR5) or Quadro P3200 (6 GB GDDR5) or Quadro P4200 (8 GB GDDR5) or Quadro P5200 (16 GB GDDR5)	three M.2 2280 drive one 2.5" drive one optical drive	Intel Intel I219-LM Gigabit Ethernet; Intel Wireless-AC 9560 (802.11ac Bluetooth 5.0) WLAN optional Intel XMM 7360 LTE-Advanced WWAN or HP lt4132 LTE/HSPA+ 4G WWAN optional WNC XRAV-1 (NXP NPC300) NFC		17.3" WLED HD+ 400:1 220nits SVA 85%sRGB or 17.3" WLED FHD 800:1 300nits UWVA 100%sRGB or 17.3" WLED UHD 1000:1 400nits UWVA 100%sRGB or 17.3" WLED UHD 1000:1 400nits UWVA 100%AdobeRGB 10(8+2)bit DreamColor	optional 720P HD or 720P HD with IR	96 Wh	

=== Sixth generation ===
This generation of ZBook workstations feature Intel Whiskey Lake quad-core CPU with integrated Intel Gen9 GPU and optional AMD Polaris 23 GPU for lightweight models, and Intel Coffee Lake R quad-core, hexa-core or octa-core CPU with integrated Intel Gen9 GPU and optional Nvidia Turing GPU for performance models. This generation also made Wi-Fi 6 available for ZBook products for the first time. All models continue to use the fifth-generation chassis design.

- ZBook 14u G6: 14.0" lightweight workstation
- ZBook 15u G6: 15.6" lightweight workstation
- ZBook 15 G6: 15.6" performance workstation
- ZBook 17 G6: 17.3" performance workstation

==== Specifications ====
Sixth generation (2019)
Model	Dimensions	Weight, min.	CPU	Chipset	Memory	Graphics	Storage	Networking	Audio	Screen	Webcam	Battery	Operating system
14u G6	326 × 234.3 × 17.9 mm	1.48 kg (3.3 lb)	Intel Core Whiskey Lake i5-8265U (4C8T 1.6 GHz) or i5-8365U (vPro 4C8T 1.6 GHz) or i7-8565U (4C8T 1.8 GHz) or i7-8665U (vPro 4C8T 1.9 GHz)		up to 64 GB DDR4-2400 non-ECC (2 slots)	Intel UHD 620 optional AMD Radeon Pro WX 3200 (4 GB GDDR5)	one M.2 2280 drive	Intel I219-V GbE or Intel I219-LM GbE (vPro); Intel Wireless-AC 9560 (802.11ac Bluetooth 5.0) WLAN or Intel Wi-Fi 6 AX200 (802.11ax Bluetooth 5.0) WLAN optional Intel XMM 7262 LTE-Advanced WWAN or Intel XMM 7360 LTE-Advanced WWAN or Intel XMM 7560 LTE-Advanced WWAN optional NXP NPC300 NFC	Audio by Bang & Olufsen & HD audio with dual stereo speakers, HP world-facing microphone with dual array digital microphone, functions keys for volume up and down and combo microphone/headphone	14.0" WLED, up to UHD (3840 × 2160) 14.0" WLED, up to FHD (1920 × 1080) touch	optional 720p HD or 720p HD with IR	50 Wh	
15u G6	370.8 × 251 × 18.6 mm	1.77 kg (3.9 lb)	Intel Core Whiskey Lake i5-8265U (4C8T 1.6 GHz) or i5-8365U (vPro 4C8T 1.6 GHz) or i7-8565U (4C8T 1.8 GHz) or i7-8665U (vPro 4C8T 1.9 GHz)		up to 64 GB DDR4-2400 non-ECC (2 slots)	Intel UHD 620 optional AMD Radeon Pro WX 3200 (4 GB GDDR5)	one M.2 2280 drive	Intel I219-V GbE or Intel I219-LM GbE (vPro); Intel Wireless-AC 9560 (802.11ac Bluetooth 5.0) WLAN or Intel Wi-Fi 6 AX200 (802.11ax Bluetooth 5.0) WLAN optional Intel XMM 7262 LTE-Advanced WWAN or Intel XMM 7360 LTE-Advanced WWAN or Intel XMM 7560 LTE-Advanced WWAN optional NXP NPC300 NFC		15.6" WLED, up to UHD (3840 × 2160) 15.6" WLED, up to FHD (1920 × 1080) touch	optional 720p HD or 720p HD with IR	56 Wh	
15 G6	375.9 mm × 264.16 mm × 25.4 mm	2.6 kg (5.7 lb)	Intel Core Coffee Lake R i5-9300H (4C8T 2.4 GHz) or i5-9400H (vPro 4C8T 2.5 GHz) or i7-9750H (6C12T 2.6 GHz) or i7-9850H (vPro 6C12T 2.6 GHz) or i9-9880H (vPro 8C16T 2.3 GHz) or Intel Xeon E-2286M (vPro ECC 8C16T 2.4 GHz)	Intel CM246	128 GB DDR4-2667 non-ECC; 64 GB DDR4-2667 ECC (Xeon) (4 slots)	Intel UHD 630 or Intel UHD P630 (Xeon) optional NVIDIA Quadro T1000 (4GB GDDR5) or Quadro T2000 (4GB GDDR5) or Quadro RTX3000 (6GB GDDR6)	two M.2 2280 drive one 2.5" drive	Intel I219-V GbE or Intel I219-LM GbE (vPro); Intel Wi-Fi 6 AX200 (802.11ax Bluetooth 5.0) WLAN optional Intel XMM 7360 LTE-Advanced WWAN optional WNC XRAV-1 NFC		15.6" WLED, up to UHD (3840 × 2160) 15.6" WLED, up to UHD (3840 × 2160) touch	optional 720p HD or 1080p FHD with IR	90 Wh	
17 G6	416 mm × 288.4 mm × 33.8 mm	3.2 kg (7.1 lb)	Intel Core Coffee Lake R i5-9300H (4C8T 2.4 GHz) or i5-9400H (vPro 4C8T 2.5 GHz) or i7-9750H (6C12T 2.6 GHz) or i7-9850H (vPro 6C12T 2.6 GHz) or i9-9880H (vPro 8C16T 2.3 GHz) or Intel Xeon E-2286M (vPro ECC 8C16T 2.4 GHz)	Intel CM246	128 GB DDR4-2667 non-ECC; 64 GB DDR4-2667 ECC (Xeon) (4 slots)	Intel UHD 630 or Intel UHD P630 (Xeon); MXM slot, optional NVIDIA Quadro T1000 (4 GB GDDR5) or Quadro RTX3000 (6GB GDDR6) or Quadro RTX4000 (8GB GDDR6) or Quadro RTX5000 (16GB GDDR6)	three M.2 2280 drive one 2.5" drive one optical drive	Intel I219-V GbE or Intel I219-LM GbE (vPro); Intel Wi-Fi 6 AX200 (802.11ax Bluetooth 5.0) WLAN optional Intel XMM 7360 LTE-Advanced WWAN optional WNC XRAV-1 NFC		17.3" WLED, up to UHD (3840 × 2160) 17.3" WLED, UHD (3840 × 2160) touch	optional 720p HD or 1080p FHD with IR	95.6 Wh	

=== Seventh generation ===
This generation of ZBook workstations feature Intel Comet Lake CPU with integrated Intel Gen9 GPU and optional Nvidia GPU.

- ZBook Firefly 14 G7: 14.0" lightweight workstation Ultrabook
- ZBook Firefly 15 G7: 15.6" lightweight workstation Ultrabook
- ZBook Power G7: 15.6" budget performance workstation
- ZBook Create G7: 15.6" slim performance (video editing, non-CAD) creator workstation
- ZBook Studio G7: 15.6" slim performance workstation
- ZBook Fury 15 G7: 15.6" high-end workstation
- ZBook Fury 17 G7: 17.3" high-end workstation

==== Specifications ====
Seventh generation (2020)
Model	Dimensions	Weight, min.	CPU	Chipset	Memory	Graphics	Storage	Networking	Audio	Screen	Webcam	Battery	Operating system
Firefly 14 G7	323 × 214.6 × 17.9 mm (12.73 × 8.45 × 0.71 in)	1.41 kg (3.1 lb)	Intel Core Comet Lake U i5-10210U (4C8T 1.6 GHz vPro) or i5-10310U (4C8T 1.7 GHz vPro) or i7-10510 (4C8T 1.8 GHz) or i7-10610U (4C8T 1.8 GHz vPro) or i7-10810U (6C12T 1.1 GHz vPro)		up to 64 GB DDR4-2667 non-ECC w/ Integrated Graphics (2 slots) up to 32 GB DDR4-2667 non-ECC SDRAM w/ Discrete Graphics (soldered)	Intel UHD 620 optional NVIDIA Quadro P520 (4 GB GDDR5)	up to one, 2 TB PCIe NVMe M.2 SSD or 256 GB Intel PCIe NVMe M.2 SSD w/ 16 GB Intel Optane up to 512 GB Intel PCIe NVMe M.2 SSD w/ 32 GB Intel Optane	Intel Wi-Fi 6 AX201 (2x2) and Bluetooth 5 combo optional WWAN Intel XMM 7560 LTE-Advanced Pro Cat 16 or Intel XMM 7360 LTE Advanced CAT 9 optional NXP NPC100 NFC	Audio by Bang & Olufsen & HD audio with dual stereo speakers, HP world-facing microphone dual array digital microphone, functions keys for volume up and down and combo microphone/headphone jack	14.0" IPS, FHD (1920 × 1080); IPS, FHD w/ integrated privacy screen (1920 × 1080); IPS touch, FHD (1920 × 1080); IPS, HDR-400, UHD (3840 × 2160)	720p HD or 720p HD with IR	56 Wh	
Firefly 15 G7	359.5 × 233.6 × 19.2 mm (14.15 × 9.19 × 0.76 in)	1.75 kg (3.9 lb)	Intel Core Comet Lake U i5-10210U (4C8T 1.6 GHz vPro) or i5-10310U (4C8T 1.7 GHz vPro) or i7-10510 (4C8T 1.8 GHz) or i7-10610U (4C8T 1.8 GHz vPro) or i7-10810U (6C12T 1.1 GHz vPro)		up to 64 GB DDR4-2667 non-ECC (2 slots)	Intel UHD 620 optional NVIDIA Quadro P520 (4 GB GDDR5)	up to one, 2 TB PCIe NVMe M.2 SSD or 256 GB Intel PCIe NVMe M.2 SSD w/ 16 GB Intel Optane up to 512 GB Intel PCIe NVMe M.2 SSD w/ 32 GB Intel Optane	Intel Wi-Fi 6 AX201 (2x2) and Bluetooth 5 combo optional WWAN Intel XMM 7560 LTE-Advanced Pro Cat 16 or Intel XMM 7360 LTE Advanced CAT 9 optional NXP NPC100 NFC		15.6" IPS, FHD (1920 × 1080); IPS touchscreen, FHD (1920 × 1080); IPS, UHD (3840 × 2160)	720p HD or 720p HD with IR	53 Wh	
Power G7	359.4 mm × 233.9 mm × 22.8 mm (14.15 in × 9.21 in × 0.90 in)	1.9 kg (4.2 lb)	Intel Core Comet Lake H i5-10300H (4C8T 2.5 GHz) or i5-10400H (4C8T 2.6 GHz vPro) or i7-10750H (6C12T 2.6 GHz) or i7-10850H (6C12T 2.7 GHz vPro) or i9-10885H (8C16T 2.4 GHz vPro) or Intel Xeon W-10855M (6C12T 2.8 GHz vPro)	Intel WM490	up to 64 GB DDR4-3200 non-ECC or 32 GB DDR4-2666 ECC (Xeon) (2 slots)	Intel UHD 630 or Intel UHD P630 (Xeon) optional NVIDIA Quadro P620 (4 GB GDDR5) or Quadro T1000 MaxQ (4 GB GDDR6) or Quadro T2000 Max-Q (4 GB GDDR6)	up to two, 2 TB PCIe NVMe M.2 SSD	Intel I219-V GbE or Intel I219-LM GbE (vPro); Intel Wi-Fi 6 AX201 (802.11ax Bluetooth 5.1) WLAN optional NXP NPC100 NFC		15.6" IPS, 250nits, FHD (1920 × 1080); IPS, 400nits, FHD (1920 × 1080); IPS, 400nits, UHD (3840 × 2160); IPS, 250nits, FHD (1920 × 1080) touch	720p HD or 720p HD with IR	83 Wh	
Create G7	13.93 in × 9.24 in × 0.70 in; 354 mm × 234.6 mm × 17.9 mm (touch: 0.4 mm thinner)	1.92 kg (4.2 lb)	Intel Core Comet Lake H i5-10400H (4C8T 2.5 GHz vPro) or i7-10750H (6C12T 2.6 GHz) or i7-10850H (6C12T 2.7 GHz vPro) or i9-10885H (8C16T 2.4 GHz vPro)	Intel WM490	up to 32 GB DDR4-2933 non-ECC SDRAM (soldered)	Intel UHD 630 optional NVIDIA GeForce RTX 2070 Max-Q (8 GB GDDR6) or GeForce RTX 2070 SUPER MaxQ (8 GB GDDR6) or GeForce RTX 2080 SUPER Max-Q (8 GB GDDR6)	up to one, 2 TB PCIe NVMe M.2 SSD	Intel Wi-Fi 6 AX201 (802.11ax Bluetooth 5.1) WLAN		15.6" IPS, 400nits, FHD (1920 × 1080); IPS, HP Sure View, 1000nits, FHD (1920 × 1080); IPS, HP Dreamcolor HDR400, 600nits, UHD (3840 × 2160); OLED, HDR500, 400nits, UHD (3840 × 2160)	720p HD or 720p HD with IR	83 Wh	
Studio G7	13.93 in × 9.24 in × 0.70 in; 354 mm × 234.6 mm × 17.9 mm (touch: 0.4 mm thinner)	1.74 kg (3.8 lb)	Intel Core Comet Lake H i5-10400H (4C8T 2.6 GHz vPro) or i7-10750H (6C12T 2.6 GHz) or i7-10850H (6C12T 2.7 GHz vPro) or i9-10885H (8C16T 2.4 GHz vPro) or Intel Xeon W-10885M (8C16T 2.4 GHz vPro)	Intel WM490	up to 32 GB DDR4-2933 non-ECC SDRAM (soldered)	Intel UHD 630 optional NVIDIA Quadro T1000 (4 GB GDDR5) or Quadro T2000 Max-Q (4 GB GDDR6) or Quadro RTX 3000 Max-Q (6GB GDDR6) or Quadro RTX 4000 Max-Q (8GB GDDR6) or Quadro RTX 5000 Max-Q (16GB GDDR6)	up to one, 2 TB PCIe NVMe M.2 SSD	Intel Wi-Fi 6 AX201 (802.11ax Bluetooth 5.1) WLAN		15.6" IPS, 400nits, FHD (1920 × 1080); IPS, HP Sure View, 1000nits, FHD (1920 × 1080); IPS, HP Dreamcolor HDR400, 600nits, UHD (3840 × 2160); OLED, HDR500, 400nits, UHD (3840 × 2160)	720p HD or 720p HD with IR	83 Wh	
Fury 15 G7	357 × 242.5 × 25.9 mm (14.06 × 9.55 × 1.02 in)	2.35 kg (5.2 lb)	Intel Core Comet Lake H i5-10300H (4C8T 2.5 GHz) or i5-10400H (4C8T 2.6 GHz vPro) or i7-10750H (6C12T 2.6 GHz) or i7-10850H (6C12T 2.7 GHz vPro) or i9-10885H (8C16T 2.4 GHz vPro) or Intel Xeon W-10885M (8C16T 2.4 GHz vPro)	Intel WM490	up to 128 GB DDR4-2666 non-ECC or 64 GB DDR4-2666 ECC (Xeon) (4 slots)	Intel UHD 630 optional NVIDIA Quadro T1000 (4 GB GDDR5) or Quadro T2000 Max-Q (4 GB GDDR6) or Quadro RTX 3000 (6GB GDDR6) or Quadro RTX 4000 Max-Q (8GB GDDR6) or Quadro RTX 5000 Max-Q (16GB GDDR6) or AMD Radeon RX 5500M (4GB GDDR6) or Radeon Pro W5500M (4GB GDDR6)	up to four, 2 TB PCIe NVMe M.2 SSD or up to two, 2 TB PCIe NVMe M.2 SSD and up to one, 2 TB 2.5" SATA HDD	Intel I219-V GbE or Intel I219-LM GbE (vPro); Intel Wi-Fi 6 AX201 (802.11ax Bluetooth 5.1) WLAN optional Intel XMM 7360 LTE-Advanced WWAN optional NXP NPC100 NFC		15.6" IPS, 250nits, FHD (1920 × 1080); IPS, 400nits, FHD (1920 × 1080); IPS, HP Sure View, 1000nits, FHD (1920 × 1080); IPS, HP Dreamcolor HDR400, 600nits, UHD (3840 × 2160); IPS, HRD400, 600nits, UHD (3840 × 2160 touch)	720p HD or 720p HD with IR	94 Wh	
Fury 17 G7	398.4 × 267.1 × 26.9 mm (15.69 × 10.52 × 1.06 in)	2.76 kg (6.1 lb)	Intel Core Comet Lake H i5-10300H (4C8T 2.5 GHz) or i5-10400H (4C8T 2.6 GHz vPro) or i7-10750H (6C12T 2.6 GHz) or i7-10850H (6C12T 2.7 GHz vPro) or i9-10885H (8C16T 2.4 GHz vPro) or Intel Xeon W-10885M (8C16T 2.4 GHz vPro)	Intel WM490	up to 128 GB DDR4-2666 non-ECC or 64 GB DDR4-2666 ECC (Xeon) (4 slots)	Intel UHD 630 optional NVIDIA Quadro T1000 (4 GB GDDR5) or Quadro T2000 Max-Q (4 GB GDDR6) or Quadro RTX 3000 (6GB GDDR6) or Quadro RTX 4000 Max-Q (8GB GDDR6) or Quadro RTX 5000 Max-Q (16GB GDDR6) or AMD Radeon RX 5500M (4GB GDDR6) or Radeon Pro W5500M (4GB GDDR6)	up to four, 2 TB PCIe NVMe M.2 SSD or up to two, 2 TB PCIe NVMe M.2 SSD and up to one, 2 TB 2.5" SATA HDD	Intel I219-V GbE or Intel I219-LM GbE (vPro); Intel Wi-Fi 6 AX201 (802.11ax Bluetooth 5.1) WLAN optional Intel XMM 7360 LTE-Advanced WWAN optional NXP NPC100 NFC		17.3" IPS, 300nits, FHD (1920 × 1080); IPS, 550nits, UHD (3840 × 2160); IPS, HP Dreamcolor HDR400, 550nits, UHD (3840 × 2160); IPS, HRD400, 550nits, UHD (3840 × 2160 touch)	720p HD or 720p HD with IR	94 Wh	

=== Eighth generation ===
This generation of ZBook Firefly workstations features Intel Tiger Lake CPU with Gen12 (Xe) Graphics, optional Nvidia T500 GPU and optional Qualcomm Snapdragon X55 5G WWAN.

- ZBook Firefly 14 G8: 14-inch lightweight workstation
- ZBook Firefly 15 G8: 15.6-inch lightweight workstation
- ZBook Power G8: 15.6-inch budget performance workstation
- ZBook Studio G8: 15.6-inch slim performance workstation
- ZBook Fury 15 G8: 15.6-inch high-end workstation
- ZBook Fury 17 G8: 17.3-inch high-end workstation

==== Specifications ====
Eighth generation (2020/2021)
Model	Dimensions	Weight, min.	CPU	Chipset	Memory	Graphics	Storage	Networking	Audio	Screen	Webcam	Battery	Operating system
Firefly 14 G8	323.0 × 214.6 × 17.9 mm (12.73 × 8.45 × 0.71 in)	1.35 kg (3.0 lb)	Intel Core Tiger Lake UP3 i5-1135G7 (4C8T 2.4 GHz) or i5-1145G7 (4C8T 2.6 GHz vPro) or i7-1165G7 (4C8T 2.8 GHz) or i7-1185G7 (4C8T 3.0 GHz vPro)		up to 64 GB DDR4-3200 non-ECC w/ Integrated Graphics (2 slots) up to 32 GB DDR4-3200 non-ECC SDRAM w/ Discrete Graphics (soldered)	Iris Xe Graphics G7 optional Nvidia Quadro T500 (4 GB GDDR6)	up to one, 2 TB PCIe 3.0 NVMe M.2 SSD or 512 GB Intel PCIe NVMe M.2 SSD w/ 32 GB Intel Optane	Intel Wi-Fi 6 AX201 (802.11ax Bluetooth 5.1) WLAN optional WWAN Intel XMM 7360 LTE Advanced CAT 9 or Qualcomm Snapdragon X55 5G optional NXP NPC100 NFC	Audio by Bang & Olufsen with dual stereo speakers, HP world-facing microphone with dual array digital microphone, functions keys for volume up and down and combo microphone/headphone jack, HD audio	14.0" IPS, 250nits, FHD (1920 × 1080); IPS, 400nits, FHD (1920 × 1080); IPS, HP Sure View, 1000nits, FHD (1920 × 1080); IPS, HP Dreamcolor, 500nits, FHD (1920 × 1080); IPS, 250nits, FHD (1920 × 1080) touch	720p HD or 720p HD with IR	53 Wh	
Firefly 15 G8	359.5 mm × 233.6 mm × 19.2 mm	1.7 kg (3.7 lb)	Intel Core Tiger Lake UP3 i5-1135G7 (4C8T 2.4 GHz) or i5-1145G7 (4C8T 2.6 GHz vPro) or i7-1165G7 (4C8T 2.8 GHz) or i7-1185G7 (4C8T 3.0 GHz vPro)		up to 64 GB DDR4-3200 non-ECC (2 slots)	Iris Xe Graphics G7 optional Nvidia Quadro T500 (4 GB GDDR6)	up to one, 2 TB PCIe 3.0 NVMe M.2 SSD or 512 GB Intel PCIe NVMe M.2 SSD w/ 32 GB Intel Optane	Intel Wi-Fi 6 AX201 (802.11ax Bluetooth 5.1) WLAN optional WWAN Intel XMM 7360 LTE Advanced CAT 9 or Qualcomm Snapdragon X55 5G optional NXP NPC100 NFC		15.6" IPS, 250nits, FHD (1920 × 1080); IPS, 400nits, FHD (1920 × 1080); IPS, HP Sure View, 1000nits, FHD (1920 × 1080); IPS, 400nits, UHD (3840 × 2160); IPS, 250nits, FHD (1920 × 1080) touch	720p HD or 720p HD with IR	56 Wh	
Power G8	359.4 mm × 233.9 mm × 22.8 mm	1.9 kg (4.2 lb)	Intel Core Tiger Lake H i5-11400H (6C12T 2.7 GHz) or i5-11500H (6C12T 2.9 GHz vPro) or i7-11800H (8C16T 2.3 GHz) or i7-11850H (8C16T 2.5 GHz vPro) or i9-11900H (8C16T 2.5 GHz) or i9-11950H (8C16T 2.6 GHz vPro)	Intel WM 590	up to 64 GB DDR4-3200 non-ECC (2 slots)	Intel UHD optional NVIDIA Quadro T600 (4 GB GDDR) or Quadro T1200 (4 GB GDDR6) or RTX A2000 (4 GB GDDR6)	up to two, 2 TB PCIe 4.0 + 3.0 NVMe M.2 SSD	Intel I219-V GbE or Intel I219-LM GbE (vPro); Intel Wi-Fi 6 AX201 (802.11ax Bluetooth 5.2) WLAN optional NXP NPC100 NFC		15.6" IPS, 250nits, FHD (1920 × 1080); IPS, 400nits, FHD (1920 × 1080); IPS, 400nits, UHD (3840 × 2160); IPS, 250nits, FHD (1920 × 1080) touch	720p HD or 720p HD with IR	83 Wh	
Studio G8	354 mm × 234.6 mm × 17.85 mm (touch: 0.35 mm thinner)	1.79 kg (3.9 lb)	Intel Core Tiger Lake H i7-11800H (8C16T 2.3 GHz) or i7-11850H (8C16T 2.5 GHz vPro) or i9-11900H (8C16T 2.5 GHz) or i9-11950H (8C16T 2.6 GHz vPro)	Intel WM 590	up to 32 GB DDR4-3200 non-ECC SDRAM (soldered)	Intel UHD optional NVIDIA Quadro T1200 (4 GB GDDR6) or RTX A2000 (4 GB GDDR6) or RTX A3000 (6 GB GDDR6) or RTX A4000 (8 GB GDDR6) or RTX A5000 (16 GB GDDR6) or GeForce RTX 3060 (6 GB GDDR6) or GeForce RTX 3070 (8 GB GDDR6) or GeForce RTX 3080 (16 GB GDDR6)	up to one, 2 TB PCIe 4.0 (@3.0) NVMe M.2 SSD	Intel Wi-Fi 6 AX201 (802.11ax Bluetooth 5.2) WLAN		15.6" IPS, 400nits, FHD (1920 × 1080); IPS, HP Dreamcolor 600nits, UHD (3840 × 2160); IPS, HP Sure View, 1000nits, FHD (1920 × 1080); OLED, 400nits, UHD (3840 × 2160) touch	720p HD or 720p HD with IR	83 Wh	
Fury 15 G8	361 × 242.5 × 25.95 mm (14.21 × 9.55 × 1.0222 in)	2.35 kg (5.2 lb)	Intel Core Tiger Lake H i5-11500H (6C12T 2.9 GHz vPro) or i7-11800H (8C16T 2.3 GHz) or i7-11850H (8C16T 2.5 GHz vPro) or i9-11900H (8C16T 2.5 GHz) or i9-11950H (8C16T 2.6 GHz vPro) or Xeon W-11955M (8C16T 2.6 GHz vPro)	Intel WM 590	up to 128 GB DDR4-3200 non-ECC or 128 GB DDR4-3200 ECC (4 slots)	Intel UHD optional NVIDIA Quadro T1200 (4 GB GDDR6) or RTX A2000 (4 GB GDDR6) or RTX A3000 (6 GB GDDR6) or RTX A4000 (8 GB GDDR6) or RTX A5000 (16 GB GDDR6) or AMD Radeon Pro W6600M (8 GB GDDR6)	up to four, 2 TB PCIe 4.0 (@3.0) NVMe M.2 SSD or up to two, 2 TB PCIe 4.0 (@3.0) NVMe M.2 SSD and up to one, 2 TB 2.5" SATA HDD	Intel I219-V GbE or Intel I219-LM GbE (vPro); Intel Wi-Fi 6 AX201 (802.11ax Bluetooth 5.2) WLAN optional Intel XMM 7360 LTE-Advanced WWAN optional NXP NPC100 NFC		15.6" IPS, 250nits, FHD (1920 × 1080); IPS, 400nits, FHD (1920 × 1080); IPS, HP Dreamcolor 600nits, UHD (3840 × 2160); IPS, HP Sure View, 1000nits, FHD (1920 × 1080); IPS, 600nits, UHD (3840 × 2160) touch	720p HD or 720p HD with IR	94 Wh	
Fury 17 G8	398.4 mm × 267.1 mm × 26.95 mm	2.76 kg (6.1 lb)	Intel Core Tiger Lake H i5-11500H (6C12T 2.9 GHz vPro) or i7-11800H (8C16T 2.3 GHz) or i7-11850H (8C16T 2.5 GHz vPro) or i9-11900H (8C16T 2.5 GHz) or i9-11950H (8C16T 2.6 GHz vPro) or Xeon W-11955M (8C16T 2.6 GHz vPro)	Intel WM 590	up to 128 GB DDR4-3200 non-ECC or 128 GB DDR4-3200 ECC (4 slots)	Intel UHD optional NVIDIA Quadro T1200 (4 GB GDDR6) or RTX A2000 (4 GB GDDR6) or RTX A3000 (6 GB GDDR6) or RTX A4000 (8 GB GDDR6) or RTX A5000 (16 GB GDDR6) or AMD Radeon Pro W6600M (8 GB GDDR6)	up to four, 2 TB PCIe 4.0 (@3.0) NVMe M.2 SSD or up to two, 2 TB PCIe 4.0 (@3.0) NVMe M.2 SSD and up to one, 2 TB 2.5" SATA HDD	Intel I219-V GbE or Intel I219-LM GbE (vPro); Intel Wi-Fi 6 AX201 (802.11ax Bluetooth 5.2) WLAN optional Intel XMM 7360 LTE-Advanced WWAN optional NXP NPC100 NFC		17.3" IPS, 300nits, FHD (1920 × 1080); IPS, HP Dreamcolor HDR400, 550nits, UHD (3840 × 2160); IPS, HDR400, 550nits, UHD (3840 × 2160) touch	720p HD or 720p HD with IR	94 Wh	

=== Ninth generation ===
This generation of ZBook workstations features Intel Alder Lake CPU with integrated Intel Xe GPU and optional Nvidia GPU

- ZBook Power 15 G9: 15.6" performance workstation
- ZBook Studio 16 G9: 16" performance workstation
- ZBook Fury 16 G9: 16" performance workstation
- ZBook Firefly 14 G9: 14" lightweight workstation
- ZBook Firefly 16 G9: 16" lightweight workstation

Ninth generation
Model	Dimensions	Weight, min.	CPU	Chipset	Memory	Graphics	Storage	Networking	Audio	Screen	Webcam	Battery	Operating system
Firefly 14 G9	31.56 x 22.405 x 1.92 cm (12.42 x 8.82 x 0.76 in)	1.439 kg	12th Gen Intel Core (Alder Lake)								5 MP		
Firefly 16 G9	35.86 x 25.09 x 1.93 cm (14.12 x 9.88 x 0.76 in)	1.94 kg (4.27 lb)	12th Gen Intel Core (Alder Lake)										
Power 15 G9	35.94 x 23.39 x 2.28 cm (14.15 x 9.21 x 0.9 in)	1.9 kg (4.16 lb)	12th Gen Intel Core (Alder Lake)										
Studio 16 G9	35.6 x 24.2 x 1.9 cm; 14.02 x 9.54 x 0.76 in (non-touch); 35.6 x 24.2 x 1.8 cm; 14.02 x 9.54 x 0.72 in (touch)		12th Gen Intel Core (Alder Lake)								720p HD IR camera & Super Resolution SW		
Fury 16 G9			12th Gen Intel Core (Alder Lake)										

=== Tenth generation ===
This generation of ZBook workstations features Intel Raptor Lake CPU with integrated Intel Iris Xe GPU or AMD Zen 4 CPU with integrated AMD Radeon GPU, as well as optional Nvidia GPU. This generation of ZBook Firefly and ZBook Power is the first in the ZBook line to provide AMD Ryzen processors options.

- ZBook Firefly G10 or ZBook Firefly G10 A: 14-inch or 16-inch lightweight workstation
- ZBook Power G10 or ZBook Power G10 A: 15.6-inch budget performance workstation
- ZBook Studio G10: 16-inch slim performance workstation
- ZBook Fury G10: 16-inch performance workstation

Tenth generation
Model	Dimensions	Weight, min.	CPU	Chipset	Memory	Graphics	Storage	Networking	Audio	Screen	Webcam	Battery	Operating system
Firefly G10	31.56 x 22.405 x 1.92 cm (12.42 x 8.82 x 0.76 in)	1.45 kg (3.2 lb)	13th Gen Intel Core (Raptor Lake)			Intel Iris Xe + Nvidia RTX A500					5 MP	HP Long Life 3-cell, 51 Wh polymer	
Power G10/Power G10 A													
Studio G10	35.6 x 24.2 x 1.9 cm (non-touch); 35.6 x 24.2 x 1.8 cm (touch); 552 x 69 x 345 mm (Package)	1.73 kg (3.81 lb)	13th Gen Intel Core (Raptor Lake) i9-13900H (14C, 20T vPro) i7-13800H (14C, 20T vPro) i7-13700H (14C, 20T) i5-13600H (12C, 16T vPro)		Maximum memory: 64 GB DDR5-4800 non-ECC SODIMM; 64 GB DDR5-5600 non-ECC SODIMM Memory slots: 2 SODIMM; supports dual channel	Integrated: Intel UHD Graphics Discrete: NVIDIA GeForce RTX 4080 (12 GB GDDR6X dedicated) NVIDIA GeForce RTX 4070 Laptop GPU (8 GB GDDR6 dedicated) NVIDIA RTX 4000 Ada Generation Laptop GPU (12 GB GDDR6 dedicated) NVIDIA RTX 3000 Ada Generation Laptop GPU (8 GB GDDR6 dedicated) NVIDIA RTX 2000 Ada Generation Laptop GPU (8 GB GDDR6 dedicated) NVIDIA RTX A1000 Laptop GPU (6 GB GDDR6 dedicated)	Maximum Storage: 4 TB PCIe Gen4x4 M.2 Storage Options: 4 TB PCIe Gen4x4 NVMe M.2 SSD TLC 2 TB PCIe Gen4x4 NVMe M.2 SSD TLC 1 TB PCIe Gen4x4 NVMe M.2 SSD TLC 512 GB PCIe Gen4x4 NVMe M.2 SSD TLC 1 TB PCIe Gen4x4 NVMe SED SSD 512 GB PCIe Gen4x4 NVMe SED SSD	Intel Wi-Fi CERTIFIED 6E AX211 (2x2) and Bluetooth 5.3 wireless card, vPro Intel Wi-Fi CERTIFIED 6E AX211 (2x2) and Bluetooth 5.3 wireless card, non-vPro	Audio by Bang & Olufsen, quad-speaker audio (2 tweeters & 2 quad woofers), 2 top-facing dual array digital microphones, combo microphone/headphone jack, HD audio with 200Hz bass roll off	Non-touch: 16.0" WQUXGA DreamColor (3840 x 2400) Anti-Glare UWVA LED DCI-P3 NB2Y 500 eDP1.4 w/o PSR 100 120Hz bent LCD panel, 16.0" WUXGA (1920 x 1200) anti-glare UWVA WLED+LBL sRGB NB2Y 400 eDP 1.4+PSR2 low-power 100 bent LCD panel, 16.0" WUXGA (1920 x 1200), IPS, anti-glare, 1000 nits, 72% NTSC, HP Sure View Reflect integrated privacy screen Touch: 16.0" WQUXGA (3840 x 2400) BrightView UWVA DCI-P3 NBZ2 400 eDP 1.4+PSR 100 bent OLED panel	720p HD IR camera	HP Long Life 6-cell, 86 Wh li-ion polymer	Windows 11 Pro Windows 11 Home Ubuntu 22.04 LTS FreeDOS 3.0
Fury G10	36.3 x 25 x 2.86 cm (14.29 x 9.86 x 1.12 in, WLAN); 36.3 x 25 x 2.77 cm (14.29 x 9.86 x 1.09 in, WWAN)	2.35 kg (5.173 lb)		Intel WM790								HP XL-Long Life 95 Wh polymer fast-charge 8 cell	

=== Eleventh generation ===
This generation of ZBook workstations features Intel Meteor Lake CPU (first to be branded as Core Ultra) with integrated Intel Iris or Arc graphics, or AMD Zen 4 2023 refresh CPU with integrated NPU & GPU, as well as optional Nvidia GPU. HP highlights the AI capabilities in this generation of ZBook.

- ZBook Firefly G11 or ZBook Firefly G11 A: 14-inch or 16-inch lightweight workstation
- ZBook Power G11 or ZBook Power G11 A: 16-inch budget performance workstation
- ZBook Studio G11: 16-inch slim performance workstation
- ZBook Fury G11: 16-inch performance workstation

Eleventh generation
Model	Dimensions	Weight, min.	CPU	Chipset	Memory	Graphics	Storage	Networking	Audio	Screen	Webcam	Battery	Operating system
Firefly G11/Firefly G11 A	31.56 x 22.435 x 1.92 cm (12.42 x 8.82 x 0.76 in)	1.418 kg (3.13 lb)	Intel Core Ultra 5/7						Audio tuning by Poly Studio		5 MP	HP Long Life 3-cell, 56 Whr polymer	Windows 11/FreeDOS 3.0
Power G11/Power G11 A	35.94 x 25.1 x 2.29 cm (14.15 x 9.88 x 0.9 in)												
Studio G11		1.73 kg (3.81 lb)	Intel Core Ultra 3/5/7 H Series with vPro Technology									HP Long Life 6-cell, 86 Wh li-ion polymer	
Fury G11		2.35 kg (5.17 lb)	13th/14th Gen Intel Core with vPro Technology	Intel WM790									

== See also ==
- HP EliteBook
- Dell Precision
- ThinkPad P series and W series
- List of Hewlett-Packard products
