= Project Zero (disambiguation) =

Project Zero is the name of a team of security analysts employed by Google to find zero-day exploits.

Project Zero may also refer to:

- Project Zero, A Maurer AG SkyLoop roller coaster located at Gumbuya World in Tynong, Victoria, Australia.
- AgustaWestland Project Zero, a VTOL technology demonstrator aircraft
- Project Zero, the software development community for WebSphere sMash.
- Project Zero, the European name for the Fatal Frame video games.
- Project Zero, a Harvard project to study and improve education, initiated 1967 by Nelson Goodman

== See also ==
- Project Z
- Vision Zero
