= Channel Z =

Channel Z may refer to:

== Radio stations ==
- Channel Z, in New Zealand, now known as Kiwi FM
- WGAC-FM (1992–1996), in Augusta, Georgia, former rock station WCHZ, Channel Z-95.1
- WREW (1998–2003), in Cincinnati, Ohio, Channel Z 97.3 FM
- WXZX (1997–2000), in Columbus, Ohio, Channel Z 98.9/105.7 FM

== Other uses ==
- "Channel Z" (song), a 1989 song by The B-52's
- Channel Z, the prototype Amiga 1200 computer by Commodore

== See also ==
- Z Channel (disambiguation)
- Z (disambiguation)
