= .Z =

.Z and .z are filename extensions and may refer to the output of:

- compress (software) (.Z)
- pack (software) (.z)

== See also ==
- Z (disambiguation)
