= Big Z =

Big Z may refer to:

== People ==
- Carlos Zambrano (born 1981), Venezuelan baseball pitcher in Major League Baseball
- Nikita Zadorov (born 1995), Russian ice hockey defenseman
- Zach Zenner (born 1991), former NFL running back, most known for his time with the Detroit Lions
- Zbigniew Brzezinski (1928–2017), Polish-American political scientist
- Zdeno Chára (born 1977), Slovak ice hockey player
- Zelmo Beaty (1939–2013), basketball player in the National Basketball Association and American Basketball Association
- Zvonimir Ivišić (born 2003), Bosnian-born Croatian basketball player
- Zydrunas Ilgauskas (born 1975), Lithuanian basketball player in the National Basketball Association
- Žydrūnas Savickas (born 1975), Lithuanian strongman

== Fictional characters ==
- Zangief, a character from the Street Fighter Series
- Zaphod Beeblebrox, fictional President of the Universe from the Hitchhiker's Guide
- Zapp Brannigan, fictional starship captain from Futurama
- Zeke "Big Z" Topanga, a fictional penguin from the 2007 film, Surf's Up
