= HP Z =

Series of workstation computer models

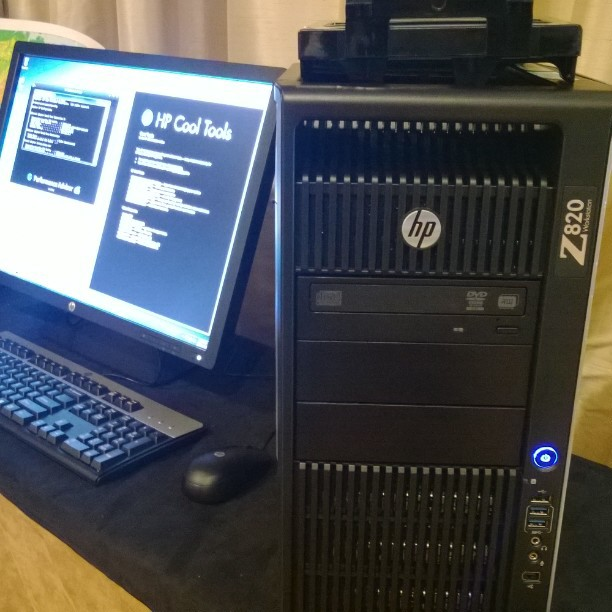
- HP Z820, the flagship model from 2012
- Developer: Hewlett-Packard (2009–2015); HP Inc. (2015–present)
- Manufacturer: Hewlett-Packard (2009–2015); HP Inc. (2015–present)
- Type: Workstation
- Released: March 2009; 17 years ago
- Operating system: Microsoft Windows, Linux
- CPU: Intel Core, Intel Xeon, AMD Ryzen, AMD Ryzen Threadripper PRO
- Graphics: Nvidia Quadro, Nvidia RTX AMD FirePro, AMD Radeon Pro
- Power: Up to 2 2.25 kW PSUs
- Marketing target: Professional purpose
- Predecessor: HP xw series
- Related: HP ZBook
- Website: www.hp.com/workstations/

HP Z is a series of upper workstation computers originally produced by Hewlett-Packard and later by its successor, HP Inc., marketed as a high-end line positioned above the EliteDesk series. The first-generation desktop products were announced in March 2009, replacing the HP xw series desktop workstations. The product line expanded to mobile with the announcement of ZBook in September 2013, replacing HP's EliteBook W-series mobile workstations. The Z workstations mainly compete against Dell's Precision workstations, Lenovo's ThinkStation and ThinkPad P series workstations, as well as Apple's Mac Pro and MacBook Pro.

== Desktop workstations ==
HP Z Workstation model list
Position	Form Factor	2009	2010	2011	2012	2013	2014	2015	2016	2017	2018	2019	2020	2021	2022	2023
Entry-level (Pentium Gold/Core i/Xeon 3000/E3/E/W-1000 series)	Tower											Z1 Entry Tower G5	Z1 Entry Tower G6	Z1 G8	Z1 G9	
Entry-level (Pentium Gold/Core i/Xeon 3000/E3/E/W-1000 series)	Convertible Minitower		Z200	Z210	Z220	Z230		Z240								
Entry-level (Pentium Gold/Core i/Xeon 3000/E3/E/W-1000 series)	Microtower/Tower					Z228		Z238			Z2 G4		Z2 G5	Z2 G8	Z2 G9	
Entry-level (Pentium Gold/Core i/Xeon 3000/E3/E/W-1000 series)	Small Form Factor		Z200	Z210	Z220	Z230		Z240			Z2 G4		Z2 G5	Z2 G8	Z2 G9	
Entry-level (Pentium Gold/Core i/Xeon 3000/E3/E/W-1000 series)	Mini								Z2 Mini G3		Z2 G4		Z2 G5		Z2 G9	
Entry-level (Pentium Gold/Core i/Xeon 3000/E3/E/W-1000 series)	All-in-one				Z1 G1		Z1 G2		Z1 G3							
Mid-range (Core i X-series/Xeon W3000/5000/E5/W_2000)	Tower	Z400			Z420		Z440			Z4 G4						Z4 G5
Mid-range (Core i X-series/Xeon W3000/5000/E5/W_2000)	Rackmount												ZCentral 4R			
High-end (x1 or x2 Xeon 5000/E5/Scalable/W-3000)	Tower	Z600			Z620		Z640			Z6 G4						Z6 G5
Top (x1 or x2 Xeon 5000/E5/Scalable/W-3000)	Tower	Z800			Z820		Z840			Z8 G4						Z8 G5; Z8 Fury G5

=== First generation ===
The HP Z800, HP Z600 and HP Z400 were announced in March 2009, offering Intel Nehalem-based Xeon processors and a new chassis design. An entry-level model, HP Z200, was announced in January 2010 at CES 2010. A small-form-factor version of the Z200, along with Intel Westmere Xeon processor refresh, were introduced to the lineup in March 2010. Z210, the successor of Z200, was announced in April 2011 with Intel Sandy Bridge Xeon E3 processors. An all-in-one workstation Z1 featuring Sandy Bridge E3 processors was introduced in February 2012. All models of the first generation came shipped with Windows Vista Professional, Windows Vista Enterprise, Windows 7 Professional or Windows Vista Enterprise. Windows Server 2008 and its minor update, Windows Server 2008 R2, were offered as an option for select models of the first-generation family.

=== Second generation ===
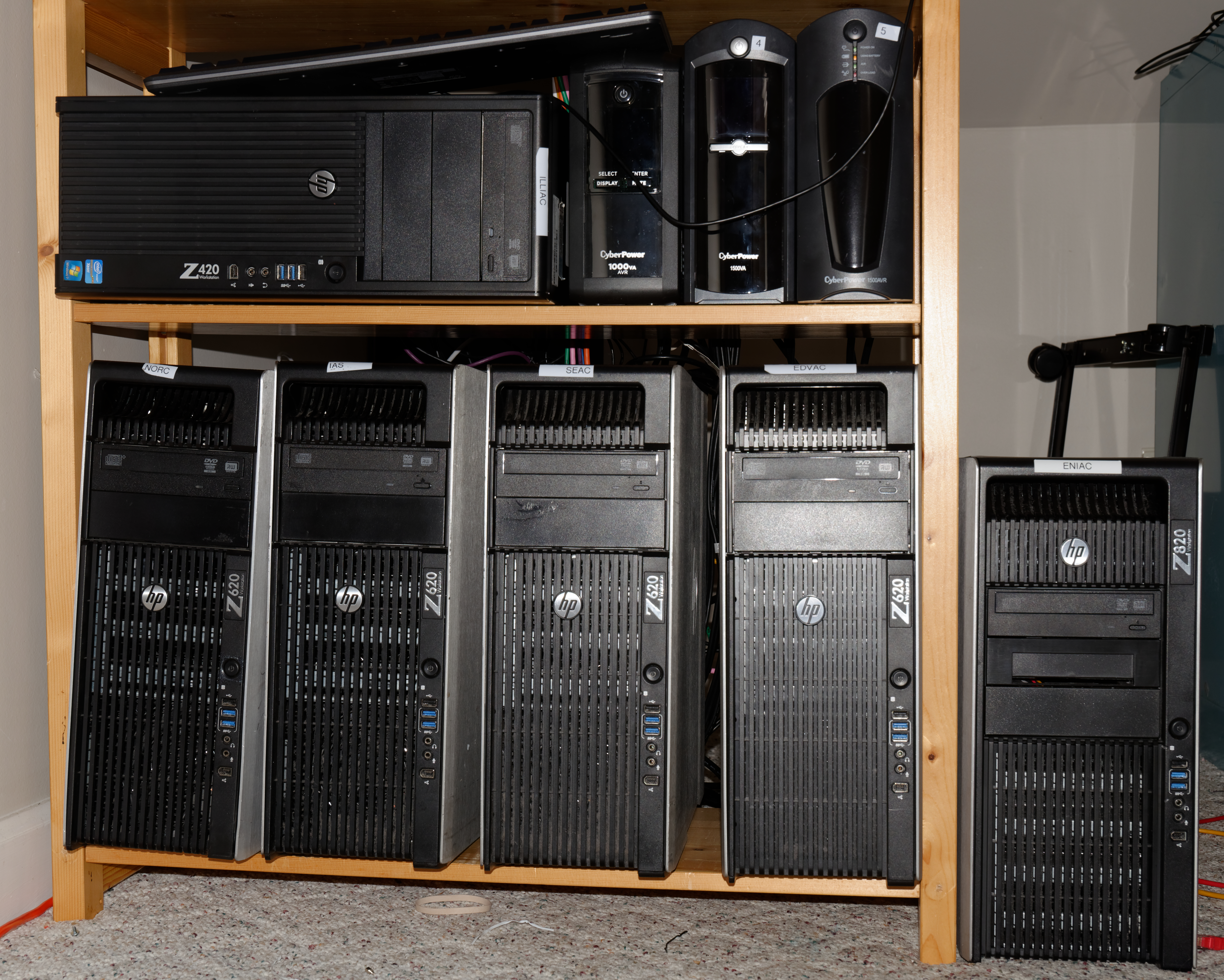
An HP Z420, four Z620s, and one Z820

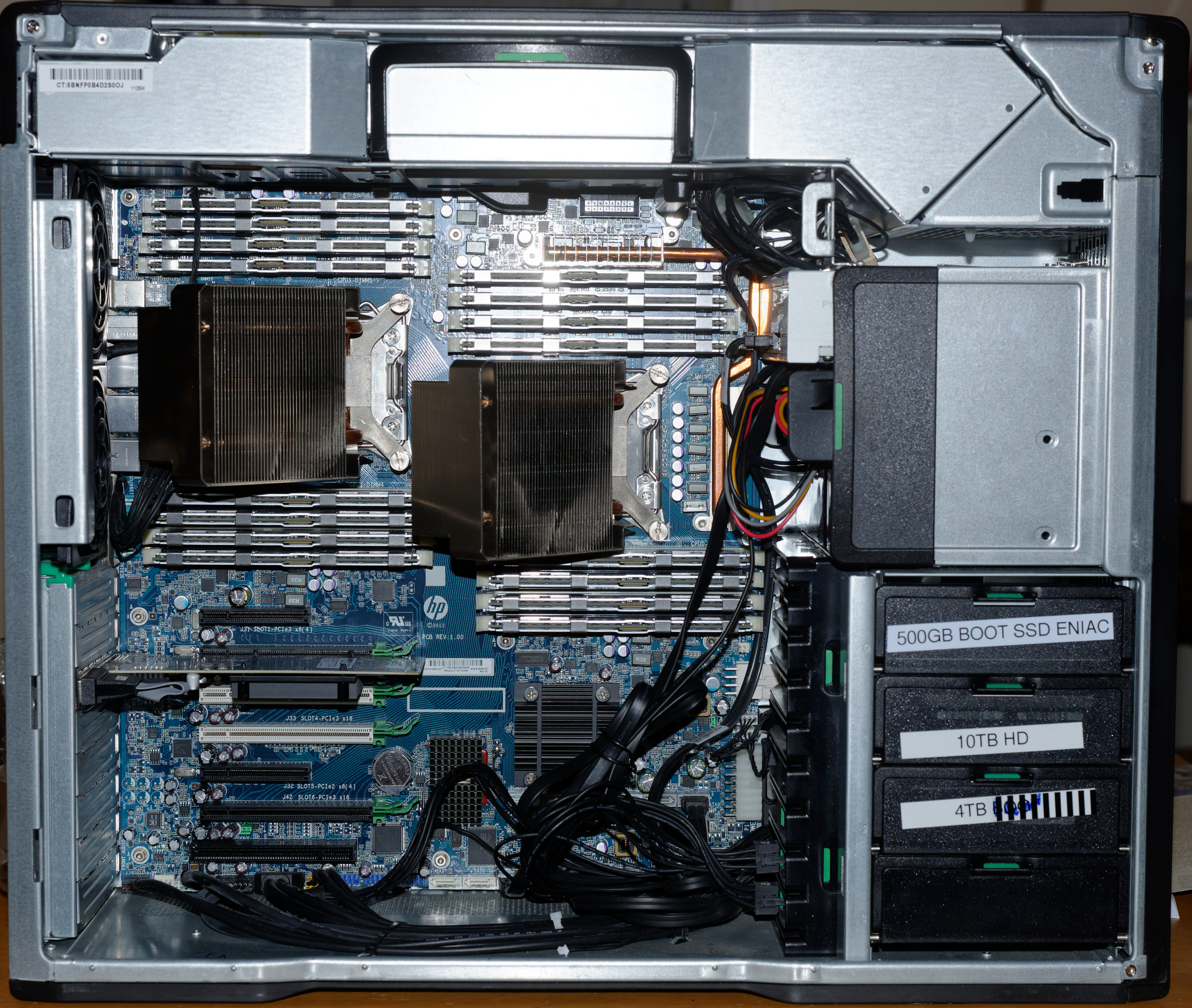
Inside a Z820

The second-generation workstations Z820, Z620 and Z420 were announced in March 2012, featuring Intel Sandy Bridge-EP Xeon E5 processors. The entry-level Z220 was refreshed with Intel Ivy Bridge Xeon E3 v2 processors in June 2012. Z230, successor to Z220, was introduced in July 2013 with Intel Haswell-WS Xeon E3 v3 processors. Z820, Z620 and Z420 were updated to Intel Ivy Bridge Xeon E5 v2 processors in September 2013. The second-generation Z1 G2 all-in-one was announced at CES 2014.

=== Third generation ===
The third-generation workstations Z840, Z640 and Z440 were announced in September 2014, featuring Intel Haswell Xeon E5 v3 processors. The processors were later updated to Broadwell in April 2016. The entry-level Z240 was announced in September 2015 with Intel Skylake E3-1200 v5 processors, and later updated to Kaby Lake Xeon E3-1200 v6 processors. The third-generation all-in-one Z1 G3 was announced in April 2016 with Intel Skylake processors. A mini workstation, Z2 Mini G3, was announced in November 2016.

=== Fourth generation ===
The fourth-generation workstations Z8 G4, Z6 G4 and Z4 G4 were announced in September 2017, shipping with Intel Skylake first-generation Xeon Scalable or W-series processors. Cascade Lake second-generation processors were made available in April 2019. Entry-level Z2 G4 and Z2 Mini G4 were announced in July 2018, featuring Intel Coffee Lake Xeon E-2100 processors.

=== Fifth generation ===
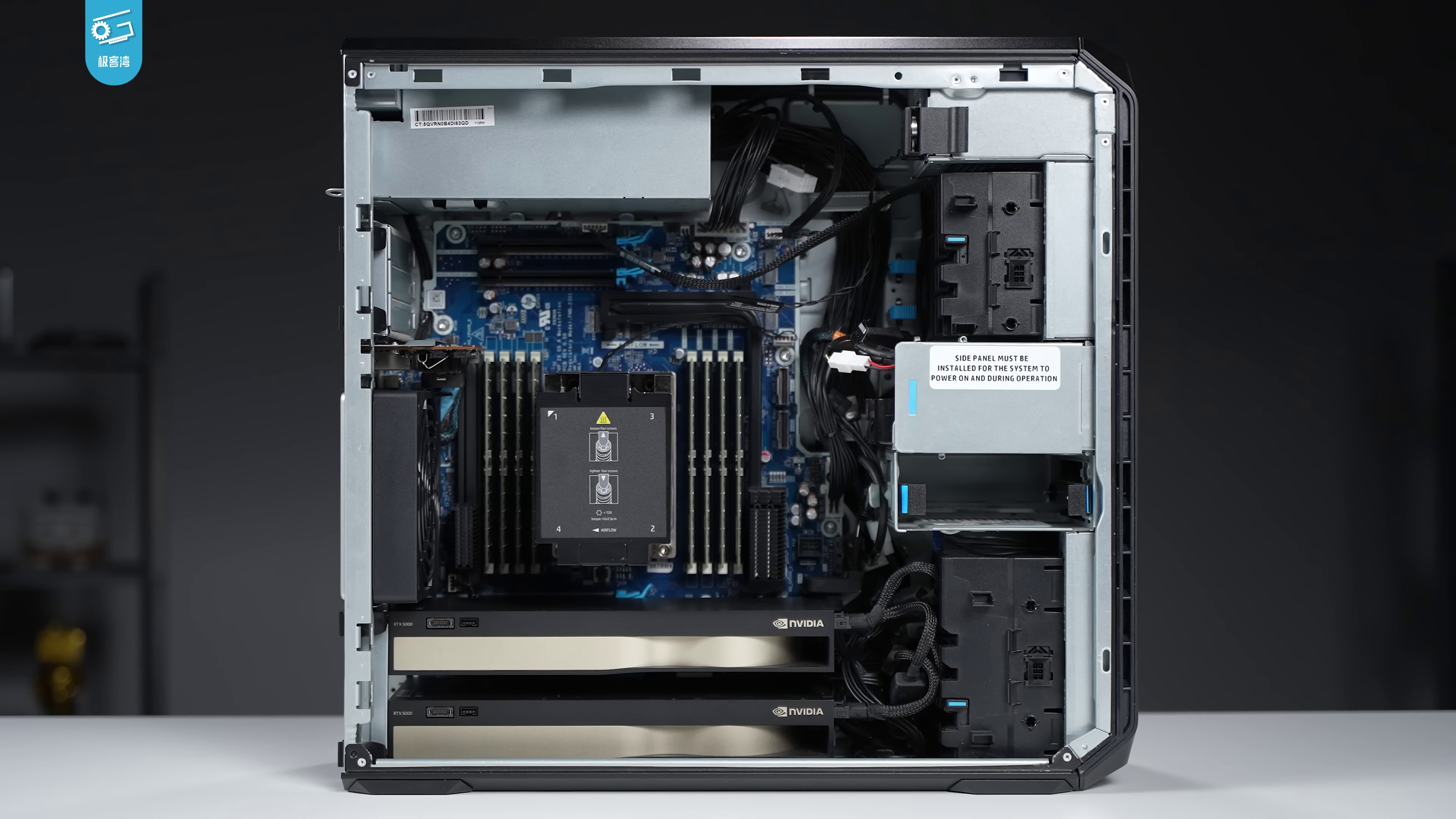
Computer hardware of the Z6 with two Nvidia RTX 5000 and an AMD Ryzen Threadripper PRO 7995WX

HP made a major update to its Z Workstation portfolio by launching G5 editions of its HP Z4, Z6, Z8, and Z8 Fury workstation in April 2023. The HP Z4 G5 edition features a new workstation-specific Sapphire Rapids CPU family, the single-socket Intel Xeon W-2400 Series, available with 6 to 24 cores. The machine supports up to 512 GB of DDR5 RAM and can host up to two dual-slot graphics cards, up to the Ada Lovelace-based Nvidia RTX 6000 (48 GB), which will benefit multi-GPU aware viz and rendering applications. The HP Z6 G5 supports the single-socket Intel Xeon W-3400 Series workstation CPU from 12 to 36 cores (not including the flagship 56-core Xeon w9-3495X). It offers double the memory of the HP Z4 G5 (up to 1 TB), more memory bandwidth, and up to three double-width GPUs. The HP Z8 G5 features Sapphire Rapids fourth-generation Xeon Scalable processors rather than the single-socket workstation-specific Xeons available in the other G5 machines. This gives it a dual CPU capability, although it only supports models up to 32 cores, meaning 64 cores (2 x 32) is the maximum configuration. The Dual CPU configuration means there is a limit of two double-width GPUs and 1 TB of memory. On top of the line, the HP Z8 Fury G5 is HP's top-end Sapphire Rapids workstation. It supports the whole range of Intel Xeon W-3400 series workstation CPUs, including the flagship 56-core Intel Xeon w9-3495X. It supports twice as much memory as the Z6 and Z8 and up to four double-width GPUs, which is of interest to those pushing the boundaries of GPU rendering, AI, or simulation, and has several server-grade features.

G5 High-end Workstations
Model	Year	Socket	CPU	Chipset	Memory (Max)	PCIe
Z4 G5	2023	FCLGA4677	Up to 26 cores Intel® Xeon® W7	Intel® W790	512 GB DDR5 ECC	Slot 1: PCIe 5 x16; Slot 2: PCIe 4 x4; Slot 3: PCIe 4 x4; Slot 4: PCIe 4 x16; Slot 5: PCIe 4 x16
Z6 G5	2023	FCLGA4677	Up to 36 cores, Intel® Xeon® W5/W7/W9	Intel® W790	1TB DDR5 ECC	Slot 1: PCIe 5 x16; Slot 2: PCIe 4 x4; Slot 3: PCIe 4 x4; Slot 4: PCIe 4 x16; Slot 5: PCIe 4 x16; Slot 6: PCIe 3 x16
Z6 G5A	2023	sTR5	1 AMD Ryzen™ Threadripper™ PRO 7000WX and 9000WX Series Processor	AMD PRO 695 Chipset	1TB DDR5 ECC	Slot 1: PCIe 5 x16; Slot 2: PCIe 5 x16; Slot 3: Mechanical; Slot 4: PCIe 5 x16; Slot 5: PCIe 5 x16; Slot 6: PCIe 4 x16; Slot 7: PCIe 4 x4
Z8 G5	2023	FCLGA4677	Up to 64 cores with 2x Intel® Xeon® Scalable	Intel® C741	1TB DDR5 ECC	Slot 1: PCIe 4 x16; Slot 2: PCIe 4 x16 - ONLY when 2nd processor is installed; Slot 3: PCIe 3 x4; Slot 4: PCIe 5 x16; Slot 5: PCIe 4 x8; Slot 6: PCIe 3 x16 - ONLY when 2nd processor is installed; Slot 7: PCIe 3 x4
Z8 Fury G5	2023	FCLGA4677	Up to 60 cores, Intel® Xeon® W9	Intel® W790	2TB DDR5 ECC	Slot 1: PCIe 5 x16; Slot 2: PCIe 5 x4; Slot 3: PCIe 5 x16; Slot 4: PCIe 4 x4; Slot 5: PCIe 4 x16; Slot 6: PCIe 3 x8; Slot 7: PCIe 4 x16; Slot 8: PCIe 4 x4

== Mobile workstations ==
The HP ZBook mobile workstation line, introduced in September 2013 as a successor to HP's EliteBook W-series, has evolved through multiple generations, each bringing advancements in performance, graphics, and portability. Below is a concise generation history based on available information, focusing on key models, release dates, and technological upgrades.

=== First generation (2013–2014) ===
Launch: September 10, 2013 Models: ZBook 14: World’s first workstation Ultrabook, with a 14" display and touch option. ZBook 15: 15.6" model with high-resolution display options, including 3200x1800. ZBook 17: 17.3" model with HP DreamColor IPS panel. Key Specs: CPUs: 4th Gen Intel Haswell dual- and quad-core processors. GPUs: NVIDIA Quadro and AMD FirePro ISV-certified graphics. Connectivity: Thunderbolt 1, USB 3.0. Features: Tool-free chassis for easy upgrades, MIL-STD 810G durability. Updates: September 8, 2014: ZBook 15 G2 and ZBook 17 G2 announced with refreshed Haswell CPUs and improved graphics.

=== Second generation (2015) ===
Launch: January 5, 2015 (ZBook 14 G2, 15u G2); November 11, 2015 (new models) Models: ZBook 14 G2: Updated Ultrabook workstation. ZBook 15u G2: Thin and light 15.6" model. ZBook 15u G3, ZBook 15 G3, ZBook 17 G3, ZBook Studio G3 (November 2015). Key Specs: CPUs: Intel Skylake Core or Xeon E3-1500M v5 processors. GPUs: AMD FirePro and NVIDIA Quadro graphics. Connectivity: Thunderbolt 3, supporting up to 10 devices via HP ZBook Dock. Features: ZBook Studio G3 was the world’s first quad-core workstation Ultrabook. Enhanced displays with DreamColor options.

=== Third generation (2017) ===
Launch: April 21, 2017 (main models); October 18, 2017 (ZBook x2 G4) Models: ZBook 14u G4, ZBook 15u G4: Lightweight models. ZBook Studio G4: Premium thin-and-light workstation. ZBook 15 G4, ZBook 17 G4: High-performance models. ZBook x2 G4: 14" 2-in-1 with detachable keyboard, similar to 14u specs. Key Specs: CPUs: Intel Kaby Lake dual- and quad-core processors; 14u/15u included 8th Gen Kaby Lake R options. GPUs: AMD Radeon Pro and NVIDIA Quadro graphics. Memory: Up to 64GB DDR4-2400 ECC/non-ECC RAM. Storage: Up to 4TB. Displays: Full HD, 4K UHD, and DreamColor options; 17" model supported 90FPS VR. Connectivity: Thunderbolt 3, USB-C, HDMI, Wi-Fi 5. Features: Enhanced security with HP Sure Start Gen3 BIOS, 14 MIL-STD 810G tests.

=== Fourth generation (2018–2019) ===
Launch: 2018 (specific dates vary by model). Models: ZBook Studio G5: 15.6" creative-focused workstation. ZBook Studio x360 G5: 15.6" convertible with 360° hinge and touchscreen option. ZBook 15v G5: Budget-friendly 15.6" model with similar performance to ZBook 15. ZBook 15 G5, ZBook 17 G5: High-end models. Key Specs: CPUs: Intel Whiskey Lake quad-core (light models) or Coffee Lake R quad/hexa/octa-core (performance models) with Intel Gen9 integrated GPUs. GPUs: Optional AMD Polaris 23 or NVIDIA Turing GPUs. Memory: Up to 64GB DDR4. Connectivity: Wi-Fi 6 introduced, Thunderbolt 3. Features: Improved color gamut displays, MIL-STD durability, and HP Wolf Security integration.

=== Fifth generation (2020–2022) ===
Launch: 2020–2021 (specific dates not fully documented). Models: ZBook Firefly G7/G8: 14" and 15.6" lightweight workstations. ZBook Power G7/G8: 15.6" budget performance model. ZBook Studio G7/G8: 15.6" slim high-performance model. ZBook Fury G7/G8: 15.6" and 17.3" desktop-class workstations. Key Specs: CPUs: Intel Comet Lake/Tiger Lake processors (10th/11th Gen). GPUs: NVIDIA Quadro T-series or RTX GPUs. Memory: Up to 64GB DDR4. Displays: 4K UHD, 120Hz options, touch on select models. Features: Enhanced thermals, longer battery life, and 5G SIM slot options on some models. Posts on X mention models like ZBook 14u G5 with 8th Gen Core i5 and SIM slot.

=== Sixth generation (2023) ===
Launch: 2023 (e.g., ZBook Power G10 announced August 2023). Models: ZBook Firefly G10/G10 A: 14" and 16" lightweight models. ZBook Power G10/G10 A: 15.6" budget performance. ZBook Studio G10: 16" slim performance. ZBook Fury G10: 16" and 17.3" high-end models. Key Specs: CPUs: Intel Raptor Lake (13th Gen) or AMD Zen 4 Ryzen PRO processors (first AMD options for Firefly/Power). GPUs: NVIDIA RTX Ada Generation GPUs (e.g., RTX 2000), AMD Radeon integrated graphics. Memory: Up to 64GB DDR5 SODIMM. Storage: Up to 4TB NVMe PCIe SSD. Features: NPUs for AI workloads, Wi-Fi 6E, and 5MP auto-framing cameras.

=== Seventh generation (2024–2025) ===
Launch: March 11, 2024 (G11 series); 2025 (ZBook Fury G1i, ZBook Ultra G1a) Models: ZBook Firefly G11/G11 A: 14" and 16" lightweight (1.4–1.76kg). ZBook Power G11/G11 A: 16" budget performance. ZBook Studio G11: 16" thin-and-light (1.73kg, 18.3mm). ZBook Fury G11/G1i: 16" and 18" (first 18" model with NVIDIA Blackwell RTX Pro 5000 GPUs). ZBook Ultra G1a: 14" AI-focused, thin workstation. Key Specs: CPUs: Intel Core Ultra 5/7/9 (Arrow Lake HX) or AMD Ryzen AI Max PRO (up to 16 cores). GPUs: NVIDIA RTX Ada (up to RTX 3000) or Blackwell RTX Pro 5000; AMD Radeon with AI accelerators. Memory: Up to 192GB unified memory (Ultra G1a) or 64GB DDR5. Storage: Up to 4TB PCIe SSD. Displays: Up to 4K WQUXGA, 120Hz, touch/stylus on select models (e.g., Studio x360). Features: AI enhancements with NPUs (up to 13 TOPS on Fury G1i) for generative AI and LLM workflows. HP Vaporforce cooling for high-end models. MIL-STD 810H, 120,000 hours of testing, EPEAT/ENERGY STAR certified. SIM slot on select models (model-dependent). Posts on X highlight models like ZBook 17 G6 (9th Gen Core i7, 64GB RAM, RTX 5000). Notes Naming Convention: "G" denotes generation (e.g., G10 is 6th Gen). "A" indicates AMD variants (e.g., Firefly G10 A). The Fury G1i’s “i” denotes Intel CPUs. Touchscreen/Stylus: Available on models like ZBook x2 G4, Studio x360 G5, and select G11 models; always check specs. SIM Slot: Present in some models (e.g., ZBook 14u G5), but not universal. Discontinued Models: Many older models (e.g., ZBook x2 G4, Studio G5) are no longer sold but may be available refurbished.

== See also ==
- Dell Precision
- Lenovo ThinkStation
- Fujitsu Celsius
- Mac Pro
- List of Hewlett-Packard products
