= Z Channel (disambiguation) =

Z Channel was one of the first pay cable stations in the United States.

Z Channel may also refer to:

- Z (TV channel), a French-language Canadian TV network sometimes called Z Channel (Fr. Canal Z)
- Z-channel (information theory), a communications channel used in coding theory and information theory
- Z Channel: A Magnificent Obsession, a 2004 documentary about the pay cable station

== See also ==
- Channel Z (disambiguation)
- Z Music Television
