= Z Plan =

Z Plan or Plan Z may refer to:

== Military and political plans ==
- Hypothesis Z, sometimes called Plan Z, the first Romanian plan for World War I
- Plan Z, a plan for re-equipment and expansion of the Nazi German Navy ordered by Adolf Hitler in 1939
- Operation Z, the Japanese code name for the 1941 Attack on Pearl Harbor in its planning stages
- Operation Z (1944), the initial Japanese plan for the defense of the Marianas Islands in WWII
- Z-4 Plan, a proposal to settle the Croatian War of Independence

== Other ==
- Plan Z (TV series), a 1990s Chilean TV series
- Plan Z, a major plot element in The SpongeBob SquarePants Movie
- Z-plan castle, a form of castle design common in England and Scotland

== See also ==
- Project Z (disambiguation)
