= Project Z =

Project Z may refer to:

- Project Z (bomber project), a Japanese project of World War II
- Project Z (band), a band for which Jimmy Herring played
- Project Z, a development of the original Nissan Z-car
- Project Z (film), a Telugu-language version of the film Maayavan

== See also ==
- Z Plan (disambiguation)
- Plan Z, the planned expansion of the German navy ordered by Adolf Hitler
- Project Zero (disambiguation)
