= ZZ zinc finger =

ZZ

Identifiers
- Symbol: ZZ
- Pfam: PF00569
- Pfam clan: CL0006
- InterPro: IPR000433
- CDD: cd02249
Available protein structures:
- PDB: IPR000433 PF00569 (ECOD; PDBsum)
- AlphaFold: IPR000433; PF00569

In molecular biology the ZZ-type zinc finger domain is a type of protein domain that was named because of its ability to bind two zinc ions. These domains contain 4-6 Cys residues that participate in zinc binding (plus additional Ser/His residues), including a Cys-X2-Cys motif found in other zinc finger domains. These zinc fingers are thought to be involved in protein-protein interactions. The structure of the ZZ domain shows that it belongs to the family of cross-brace zinc finger motifs that include the PHD, RING, and FYVE domains. ZZ-type zinc finger domains are found in:

- Transcription factors P300 and CBP.
- Plant proteins involved in light responses, such as Hrb1.
- E3 ubiquitin ligases MEX and MIB2 (EC).
- Dystrophin and its homologues

Single copies of the ZZ zinc finger occur in the transcriptional adaptor/coactivator proteins P300, in cAMP response element-binding protein (CREB)-binding protein (CBP) and ADA2. CBP provides several binding sites for transcriptional coactivators. The site of interaction with the tumour suppressor protein p53 and the oncoprotein E1A with CBP/P300 is a Cys-rich region that incorporates two zinc-binding motifs: ZZ-type and TAZ2-type. The ZZ-type zinc finger of CBP contains two twisted anti-parallel beta-sheets and a short alpha-helix, and binds two zinc ions. One zinc ion is coordinated by four cysteine residues via 2 Cys-X2-Cys motifs, and the third zinc ion via a third Cys-X-Cys motif and a His-X-His motif. The first zinc cluster is strictly conserved, whereas the second zinc cluster displays variability in the position of the two His residues.

In Arabidopsis thaliana (Mouse-ear cress), the hypersensitive to red and blue 1 (Hrb1) protein, which regulating both red and blue light responses, contains a ZZ-type zinc finger domain.

ZZ-type zinc finger domains have also been identified in the testis-specific E3 ubiquitin ligase MEX that promotes death receptor-induced apoptosis. MEX has four putative zinc finger domains: one ZZ-type, one SWIM-type and two RING-type. The region containing the ZZ-type and RING-type zinc fingers is required for interaction with UbcH5a and MEX self-association, whereas the SWIM domain was critical for MEX ubiquitination.

In addition, the Cys-rich domains of dystrophin, utrophin and an 87kDa post-synaptic protein contain a ZZ-type zinc finger with high sequence identity to P300/CBP ZZ-type zinc fingers. In dystrophin and utrophin, the ZZ-type zinc finger lies between a WW domain (flanked by and EF hand) and the C-terminal coiled-coil domain. Dystrophin is thought to act as a link between the actin cytoskeleton and the extracellular matrix, and perturbations of the dystrophin-associated complex, for example, between dystrophin and the transmembrane glycoprotein beta-dystroglycan, may lead to muscular dystrophy. Dystrophin and its autosomal homologue utrophin interact with beta-dystroglycan via their C-terminal regions, which are composed of a WW domain, an EF hand domain, and a ZZ-type zinc finger domain. The WW domain is the primary site of interaction between dystrophin or utrophin and dystroglycan, while the EF hand and ZZ-type zinc finger domains stabilise and strengthen this interaction.
