= Sleepify =

Studio album by Vulfpeck
- Released: March 2014
- Genre: Silence
- Length: 5:16
- Label: Vulf Records
- Producer: Jack Stratton

Vulfpeck chronology
My First Car (2013)	Sleepify (2014)	Fugue State (2014)

Sleepify is an album by the American funk band Vulfpeck, released March 2014. The release consists solely of ten roughly 30-second-long tracks of silence. The album was made available on the music streaming service Spotify, where the band encouraged consumers to play the album on a loop while they slept. In turn, royalties from the playing of each track on the "album" were to be used to crowdfund a free concert tour by the band.

The album was pulled by Spotify on April 26, 2014, citing violations of the service's content policies. It was estimated that the band would be able to collect at least US$20,000 in royalty payments from streams of Sleepify, although it was unclear if the band would receive the money. In July 2014, Billboard reported that the band received royalties totalling $19,655 plus an anticipated $1,100 forthcoming, and that the band was in the process of organizing a tour. In August, Vulfpeck announced the admission-free Sleepify Tour in the United States scheduled for September 2014.

The album exposed a loophole in Spotify's royalty calculation model. In March 2015, band founder Jack Stratton proposed a more equitable model for Spotify payout distribution in which each artist's payout is based solely on that artist's listeners, rather than every listener using the service.

== Background ==
Vulfpeck released Sleepify in March 2014 as a means to fund a concert tour of the same name; all of the shows were to be free of charge, but funded solely using royalty payments from the album on the music streaming service Spotify. The service calculates royalties based on how many times a track has been played, counting a single play as listening to the song for at least 30 seconds. As such, all of the tracks on Sleepify are just over thirty seconds in length, and consist solely of silence; a promotional video for the album jokingly labeled it as "the most silent album ever recorded". The band encouraged fans to stream the album on a loop overnight while they were sleeping (hence the name); with each stream costing US$0.007, The Guardian estimated that streaming the album for seven hours would accumulate $5.88 in royalty payments over 840 streams, and 100 people doing the same with one device each would accumulate $588 in payments.

The band's founder, Jack Stratton, explained that the stunt was influenced by an interview with Ron Fair he had heard on the Pensado's Place podcast, where Fair discussed how the cover of "Lady Marmalade" he produced for the film Moulin Rouge! was only available on the film's soundtrack album, meaning that consumers would have to pay for the entire album to get just the one song. Stratton went on to say that "with the technology available, that dictates the packaging of the music—whether it's a three-minute 7-inch or a 40-minute 12-inch or an eight-minute 12-inch single or a 70-minute CD. And now it's Spotify. This is just taking it to the max of short song length and extremely high volumes of play." In 2017, Vulfpeck released the album as a 7-inch single.

== Reception ==
Tim Jonze of The Guardian facetiously reviewed Sleepify, stating that the "opening track 'Z' certainly sets the tone, a subtle, intriguing work that teases the listener as to what may come next. It's followed by 'Zz' and 'Zzz' which continue along similar lyrical themes while staying true to Sleepify's overriding minimalist aesthetic. By the midpoint, you realise Vulfpeck are aiming to pull off the same trick as the Ramones: they may only have one song, but it's an effective one."

While a Spotify spokesperson had previously considered the stunt to be "clever" (joking that the album was "derivative of John Cage's work," a reference to the silent piece 4′33″), Sleepify was pulled from the service in late-April 2014, citing an unspecified violation of the service's content policies. It was estimated that Vulfpeck had accumulated enough streams to gain at least $20,000 in royalties from the "album", although it was unclear whether they would receive the money. Jack Stratton confirmed the removal with a spoken statement contained within the first track of another, three-song "album" named Official Statement, posted in place of Sleepify on Spotify.

The album's royalty-generating scheme received international press coverage, including Spiegel of Germany, Editora Abril of Brazil, The New Zealand Herald, El País of Spain, Komsomolskaya Pravda of Russia, and Time magazine of the U.S. Rolling Stone noted that Spotify still streams the Cage composition 4′33″, a performance art piece not focused on royalties generation, in which musicians refrain from playing their instruments.

A similar concept emerged in June 2015 via a website known as Eternify, by the band Ohm & Sport, which allowed users to play the first 30 seconds of any Spotify song on a loop, thus accumulating royalty payments for the artist.

== Royalties and Sleepify Tour ==
On July 22, 2014, Billboard reported that Vulfpeck received royalty payments totaling $19,655 with an additional $1,100 forthcoming. The payment calculation was based on a rate of $0.0030 to $0.0038 per play for short tracks and a total of about 5.5 million plays.

Although Spotify did allow the album to remain on its service for seven weeks and called it a "clever stunt", the service removed the album in late April without providing a specific reason for violation of its terms of service. Vulfpeck founder, Stratton, said he was surprised by the timing of the take down, given that the album could have been taken down much earlier.

In August 2014, Vulfpeck announced the admission-free Sleepify Tour scheduled for September 15 to 26, 2014. Tour locations included San Francisco, San Luis Obispo, Los Angeles, Chicago, Ann Arbor, and New York City.

== Stratton on Spotify ==
In a 2018 interview with CNBC, Stratton criticized Spotify's monthly subscription model, and claimed the model "looks more like radio than an on-demand model." However, he was supportive of streaming services for providing a platform for artist visibility.

== Track listing ==
Sleepify track listing
No.	Title	Length
1.	"Z"	0:31
2.	"Zz"	0:32
3.	"Zzz"	0:32
4.	"Zzzz"	0:32
5.	"Zzzzz"	0:31
6.	"Zzzzzz"	0:32
7.	"Zzzzzzz"	0:32
8.	"Zzzzzzzz"	0:32
9.	"Zzzzzzzzz"	0:31
10.	"Zzzzzzzzzz"	0:31
Total length:		5:16

== See also ==
- List of silent musical compositions
