= We Are (Jon Batiste album) =

Studio album by Jon Batiste
- Released: March 19, 2021
- Recorded: 2019–2020
- Genres: R&B; jazz; soul; pop; hip-hop
- Length: 38:01
- Label: Verve
- Producers: Jon Batiste; Kizzo; David Pimentel

Jon Batiste chronology
Meditations (2020)	We Are (2021)	World Music Radio (2023)

Singles from We Are
- 1. "We Are" Released: June 12, 2020; 2. "I Need You" Released: January 22, 2021; 3. "Cry" Released: February 12, 2021

We Are ratings
Review scores
Source	Rating
Albumism	4/5 stars
AllMusic	4.5/5 stars
Rolling Stone	3.5/5 stars
The Spill Magazine	4.5/5 stars

We Are (stylized in all caps) is the sixth studio album by Jon Batiste. It was released on Verve Records on March 19, 2021. In April 2022, We Are won Album of the Year at the 64th Annual Grammy Awards; it earned Batiste nine nominations in total, with five wins.

Following the 64th Annual Grammy Awards, We Are reached its peak at number 25 on the US Billboard 200 with 18,000 album equivalent units.

== Background ==
Batiste began working on the album in late 2019, making it in his dressing room over six days in September and finishing it by mid-2020. While largely written and recorded prior to the events of 2020, the album's lyrical and thematic content reflects such events as the onset of the COVID-19 pandemic and his involvement in Black Lives Matter protests in New York after the murder of George Floyd and killing of Breonna Taylor.

On June 12, 2020, he released the single "We Are", featuring the band from his New Orleans alma mater, the St. Augustine High School Marching 100.

As part of Record Store Day 2020, Batiste released a limited edition EP titled We Are: Roots & Traditions.

The album also features Mavis Staples, Zadie Smith, PJ Morton, and Trombone Shorty.

Speaking to Atwood Magazine, Batiste described We Are as "a representation of genreless music that's just about the story" and "a culmination of my life to this point".

Batiste released a deluxe edition of the album on October 15, 2021.

== Awards and nominations ==
Grammy Awards

Year	Category	Nominated work	Result	Ref.
2022	Album of the Year	We Are	Won	
2022	Best R&B Album	We Are	Nominated	
2022	Record of the Year	"Freedom"	Nominated	
2022	Best Music Video	"Freedom"	Won	
2022	Best Traditional R&B Performance	"I Need You"	Nominated	
2022	Best American Roots Performance	"Cry"	Won	
2022	Best American Roots Song	"Cry"	Won	
2022	Best Contemporary Classical Composition	Batiste: Movement 11'	Nominated	

== Track listing ==
All tracks are written by Jon Batiste, except where noted.

We Are track listing
No.	Title	Writer(s)	Length
1.	"We Are" (featuring St. Augustine High School Marching 100, David Gauthier, Gospel Soul Children, Craig Adams, Braedon Gautier, Brennan Gautier, Autumn Rowe)	Batiste; Autumn Rowe; Kizzo	4:24
2.	"Tell the Truth"		3:21
3.	"Cry"	Batiste; Steve McEwan	3:57
4.	"I Need You"	Batiste; Rowe	2:37
5.	"Whatchutalkinbout"		2:21
6.	"Boy Hood" (featuring PJ Morton, Trombone Shorty)	Troy Andrews; Batiste; Sunny Levine; PJ Morton; Jahaan Sweet	4:26
7.	"Movement 11'"		2:01
8.	"Adulthood" (featuring Hot 8 Brass Band)		3:41
9.	"Mavis"	Mavis Staples	0:20
10.	"Freedom"	Batiste; Rowe; Andrae Alexander	2:58
11.	"Show Me the Way" (featuring Zadie Smith)		3:40
12.	"Sing"	Batiste; Zach Cooper; Vic Dimotsis; Eric Frederic; Rowe	3:07
13.	"Until"		1:03
Total length:			37:56

All tracks are written by Jon Batiste, except where noted.

We Are (The Deluxe Edition) track listing
No.	Title	Writer(s)	Length
1.	"I Need You"	Batiste; Rowe	2:35
2.	"Freedom"	Batiste; Rowe; Alexander	2:57
3.	"Cry"	Batiste; McEwan	3:55
4.	"Boy Hood" (featuring PJ Morton, Trombone Shorty)	Andrews; Batiste; Levine; Morton; Sweet	4:25
5.	"Sing" (featuring Tori Kelly)	Batiste; Cooper; Dimotsis; Frederic; Rowe	3:11
6.	"We Are" (featuring St. Augustine High School Marching 100, David Gauthier, Gospel Soul Children, Craig Adams, Braedon Gautier, Brennan Gautier, Autumn Rowe)	Batiste; Rowe; Kizzo	4:24
7.	"Tell the Truth"		3:22
8.	"Adulthood" (featuring BJ the Chicago Kid)		3:43
9.	"Whatchutalkinbout"		2:19
10.	"Mavis"	Staples
11.	"Freedom" (Big Freedia Remix)	Batiste; Rowe; Alexander	2:52
12.	"Tell the Truth" (Uptown Remix - featuring Big Chief Romeo Bougere of the Mardi Gras Indian Show, Michael Batiste)		3:15
13.	"Movement 11'"		2:01
14.	"Work It Out"		3:04
15.	"Adulthood" (featuring Hot 8 Brass Band)		3:42
16.	"Show Me the Way" (featuring Zadie Smith)		3:40
17.	"Sing"	Batiste; Cooper; Dimotsis; Frederic; Rowe	3:09
18.	"We Are" (Montmartre Remix - featuring Abi Bernadoth)		3:19
19.	"Until"		1:04
Total length:			57:27

== Personnel ==
=== Musicians ===
- Jon Batiste – vocals, piano, upright piano, Fender Rhodes electric piano, Wurlitzer electric piano, keyboards, organ, barrel organ, clavinet, Mellotron, 8-bit sound, Kawai synthesizer, synth strings, guitar, alto saxophone, bass, Moog bass, synth bass, drums, drum machine, drum programming, cowbell, tambourine, bongos, theremin, production, arrangement
- Craig Adams – conductor, organ
- David Gauthier – vocals
- Braedon Gautier – vocals
- Brennan Gautier – vocals
- Gospel Soul Children – vocals
- Tori Kelly – vocals
- David Pimentel – drums, producer, recording
- Autumn Rowe – composer, vocals
- Nate Smith – drums
- St. Augustine High School Marching 100 – brass band
- Cory Wong – guitar
- Sam Yahel – organ
- Mavis Staples – spoken word
- Zadie Smith – vocals
- PJ Morton – vocals
- Trombone Shorty – trombone
- Robert Randolph – pedal steel guitar
- Steve Jordan – drums
- Steve McEwan – acoustic guitar, composer
- Endea Owens – double bass
- Jahaan Sweet – composer
- Michelle Ross – violinist
- Louis Cato – guitar
- Joe Saylor – tambourine
- Emily King – vocals
- Roberta Freeman – vocals
- Carol Hatchett – vocals
- Zach Cooper – composer
- Vic Dimotsis – composer
- Eric Frederic – composer
- Sunny Levine – composer
- Hot 8 Brass Band – brass band
- Nick Waterhouse - producer, guitar

=== Technical ===
- Russell Elevado – recording
- Misha Kachkachishvili – recording
- Kizzo – composer, producer, recording
- Emerson Mancini – mastering engineer
- Manny Marroquin – mixing
- Marc Whitmore – recording, mixing
- Alex Williams – recording
- Karla Cordova – album art
- Suleika Jaouad – photography
- Quincy Jones – liner notes
- Ricky Reed – mixing
- Ryan Lynn – co-executive producer
- Ken Oriole - recording
- John Muller – engineering
- Gavin Paddock - engineering, mix engineering
- David Andersen - second engineer

== Charts ==
=== Weekly charts ===
Weekly chart performance for We Are
Chart (2021–2022)	Peak position
Australian Jazz and Blues Albums (ARIA)	1
Australian Hitseekers Albums (ARIA)	5
Austrian Albums (Ö3 Austria)	35
Belgian Albums (Ultratop Flanders)	191
Belgian Albums (Ultratop Wallonia)	175
Canadian Albums (Billboard)	81
French Albums (SNEP)	61
German Albums (Offizielle Top 100)	66
Japanese Hot Albums (Billboard Japan)	92
Swiss Albums (Schweizer Hitparade)	39
UK Album Downloads (Official Charts)	25
US Billboard 200	25
US Top R&B/Hip-Hop Albums (Billboard)	14

Weekly chart performance for We Are: Roots & Traditions
Chart (2020)	Peak position
US Top Contemporary Jazz Albums (Billboard)	9

=== Year-end charts ===
Year-end chart performance for We Are
Chart (2021)	Position
Australian Jazz and Blues Albums (ARIA)	28
