= The Fearless Flyers =

American funk band

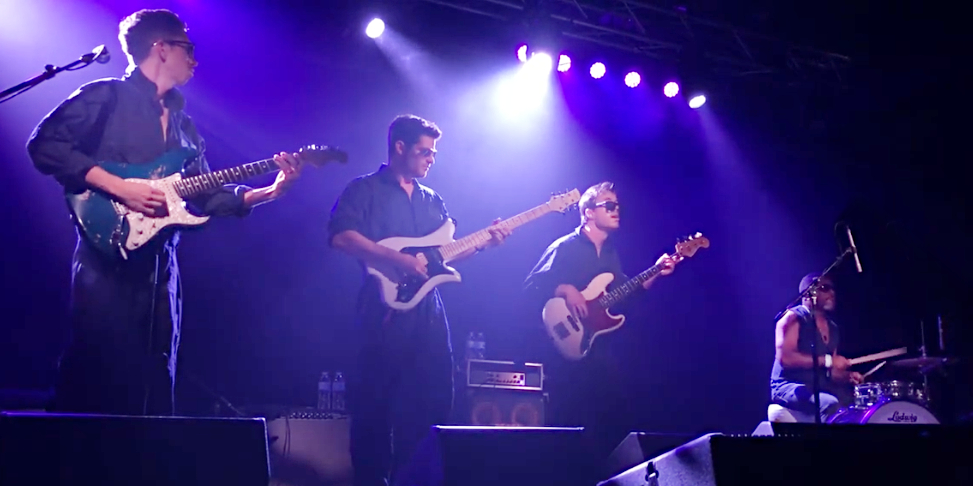
- The Fearless Flyers performing in 2018, from left to right: Cory Wong, Mark Lettieri, Joe Dart, Nate Smith

Background information
- Origin: Los Angeles, California, U.S.
- Genres: Funk
- Years active: 2018–present
- Labels: Roundwound Media; Vulf Records
- Members: Cory Wong; Mark Lettieri; Joe Dart; Nate Smith

The Fearless Flyers are an American funk supergroup formed in 2018 consisting of drummer Nate Smith, bassist Joe Dart and guitarists Cory Wong and Mark Lettieri. The band has released two studio albums, four extended plays, two live albums, and has toured in the United States and Europe.

== Background ==
The band was formed in 2018 based on an idea Jack Stratton (Vulfpeck's founder) had a few years earlier. The idea was of a rhythm-heavy four-piece band with three guitars covering three distinct sonic ranges (standard, baritone and bass) accompanied by a stripped-down drum kit (snare, kick and hi-hat), with jumpsuits and guitar stands added as a visual distinction. In 2017 Stratton approached bassist Joe Dart and guitarist Cory Wong with that idea. In turn Wong approached drummer Nate Smith and guitarist Mark Lettieri, who at the time was experimenting with baritone guitars as a funk instrument. The band came together in early 2018 with Stratton as a producer.

To capture the live energy of the band, songs are composed in close proximity to their final recording. Songwriting starts from snippets and demos that band members bring to studio. The compositions are developed and fleshed out by the group, and recordings follow shortly after. The recordings are also captured on video which are later released as music videos. According to band members, in this band "it's incumbent upon each of us to compose and step out." (Note: Quoted by bassist Joe Dart, this sentiment is echoed by the other band members.) Starting with the group's fourth EP in 2024, compositions are developed prior to recording sessions.

== History ==
The band released its first record, a six-track EP titled The Fearless Flyers, in March of 2018. The EP included contributions from Sandra Crouch on percussion, Blake Mills on guitar and Elizabeth Lea on trombone. The band's first live performance was in September 2018 at the Concord Music Hall in Chicago, during which singer-songwriter Jay Kay of Jamiroquai (who headlined the event) joined the band for an impromptu performance. In 2019, the band released its second EP titled The Fearless Flyers II. The EP included contributions from Chris Thile on miniature guitar and Joey Dosik on saxophone. In May of 2019 the band performed at Red Rocks Amphitheatre in Colorado, and in September the band opened for Vulfpeck at Madison Square Garden in New York City. The latter performance was recorded and released as a live album in 2021, titled Flyers Live at Madison Square Garden.

In 2020, the band released its first full-length album Tailwinds, which featured a horn section consisting of saxophonists Grace Kelly, Kenni Holmen and Alekos Syropoulos. In 2022, the band released its third EP The Fearless Flyers III and performed at the North Sea Jazz Festival in Rotterdam, Jazz a la Villette in Paris, and Paradiso in Amsterdam. The band's fourth EP The Fearless Flyers IV was recorded live over the course of several shows at the Blue Note Jazz Club in New York City. The EP was released in February 2024. The band's second full-length album titled The Fearless Flyers V was released in May 2025. The album was produced by Cory Wong and released under his label Roundwound Media.

== Discography ==
Studio albums

- Tailwinds (2020)
- The Fearless Flyers V (2025)

Extended plays

- The Fearless Flyers (2018)
- The Fearless Flyers II (2019)
- The Fearless Flyers III (2022)
- The Fearless Flyers IV (2024)

Live albums

- Flyers Live at Madison Square Garden (2021)
- Live in Italy (2025)
