= Chevy Chase Heights, Pennsylvania =

Unincorporated community in Pennsylvania, US

- Census-designated place
- Location within Pennsylvania Location within the United States
- Coordinates: 40°38′11″N 79°8′51″W
- Country: United States
- State: Pennsylvania
- County: Indiana
- Township: White

Area
  - Total: 1.27 sq mi (3.29 km^{2})
  - Land: 1.27 sq mi (3.29 km^{2})
  - Water: 0 sq mi (0.00 km^{2})
- Elevation: 1,440 ft (440 m)

Population (2020)
  - Total: 1,229
  - Density: 968.8/sq mi (374.04/km^{2})
- Time zone: UTC-5 (Eastern (EST))
  - Summer (DST): UTC-4 (EDT)
- ZIP code: 15701
- Area code: 724
- FIPS code: 42-13400
- GNIS feature ID: 1198273

Chevy Chase Heights is a census-designated place within White Township, Indiana County, Pennsylvania, United States. The population was 1,502 at the 2010 census.

== Geography ==
Chevy Chase Heights is located at 40°38′11″N 79°8′51″W (40.636325, -79.147385).

According to the United States Census Bureau, the area has a total area of 1.3 square miles (3.4 km^{2}), all land.

== Demographics ==
Historical population
Census	Pop.	Note	%±
2020	1,229		—
U.S. Decennial Census

The 2000 census reported 1,511 people and 418 families residing in the area. The racial makeup of the CDP was 88.75% White, 8.34% African American, and 2.91% other races or multiple races.

== Education ==
It is in the Indiana Area School District.
