= Ta Mara and the Seen =

American R&B group

- Origin: Minneapolis, Minnesota, U.S.
- Genres: Funk, funk rock, post-disco, R&B
- Years active: 1985–1989
- Label: A&M
- Past members: Ta Mara; Keith Woodson; Oliver Leiber; Gina Fellicetta; Jamie Chez

Ta Mara and the Seen was an American R&B group based in Minneapolis. They were signed by A&M Records to capitalize on the mid-1980s chart success of the "Minneapolis sound", which included acts such as Prince, Vanity 6, Sheila E., and the Time.

== Career ==
They achieved top 40 success with the single "Everybody Dance", which peaked at No. 24 on Billboard Hot 100 chart in early 1986. Other tracks from their self-titled debut album include the single "Affection", "Summertime Love", and a ballad titled "Long Cold Nights". The album was produced by former Time guitarist Jesse Johnson. The group was managed by Owen Husney. A 1988 follow-up album, Blueberry Gossip, failed to match their success as their previous album and "Everybody Dance", making it a one-hit wonder and the group disbanded in 1989. Their albums are no longer in print.

Lead singer Margaret Cox (a.k.a. Margie Cox), given the stage name Pegi Ta Mara by producer Johnson, was born in Kenitra, Morocco, and lived there until age seven, when she and her family moved to Minneapolis. Other members of the group included bassist Keith Woodson, guitarist Oliver Leiber (son of the songwriter Jerry Leiber), keyboardist Gina Fellicetta, and drummer Jamie Chez.

== Post career ==
After Ta Mara and the Seen, Cox became a pivotal figure in the Twin Cities' music community. Since 1987, she has been a central member of Dr. Mambo's Combo (now known as The Legendary Combo), performing weekly at Bunkers Music Bar & Grill in downtown Minneapolis. This residency is one of the longest-running weekly gigs in the United States and has made the band a local institution.

Prince called them his favorite Minneapolis band and would frequently sit in with them, along with artists such as John Mayer, Sheila E. and Bonnie Raitt. The band's lineup has featured a host of musicians, and Margaret Cox's vocals are a consistent highlight their performances.

== Discography ==
=== Albums ===
- Ta Mara & the Seen (1985), A&M
- Blueberry Gossip (1988), A&M

=== Singles ===
- "Everybody Dance" (1985) – U.S. No. 24, U.S. R&B No. 3, U.S. Dance No. 17
- "Affection" (1985) – U.S. R&B No. 19
- "Thinking About You" (1986) – U.S. R&B No. 85
- "Blueberry Gossip" (1988) – U.S. R&B No. 54
- "True Ecstasy" (1988)
- "Everyday People" (1988)

== See also ==
- Minneapolis sound
