= Margie Cox =

American singer (born 1962)

Margeret Cox
- Born: Margeret Cox; September 1, 1962 (age 63); Kenitra, Morocco
- Origin: Minneapolis, Minnesota, U.S.
- Genres: Pop; R&B; Minneapolis sound; funk; rock; new jack swing; funk rock; funk metal; new wave; dance; hard rock
- Occupations: Musician, songwriter
- Instrument: Vocals
- Years active: 1979–2025
- Labels: A&M Records; Warner Bros. Records; Paisley Park Records; Downtown Records
- Formerly of: Lipps, Inc; Ta Mara and the Seen; The New Power Generation; Dr. Mambo's Combo

Margie Cox (born September 1, 1962) is an American singer. She is best known as the lead singer of the Minneapolis sound band Ta Mara and the Seen, and for her work with Prince.

== Early life and career ==
Cox was born in Kenitra, Morocco, and moved to Minneapolis with her family when she was seven years old. She learned to play several instruments, including piano, guitar, and drums.

Cox attended Southeast Alternatives Free School, graduating from Marshall-University High School and sang in the nightclub Bootlegger Sam's in Dinkytown when she was in ninth grade. Influenced early on by R&B and rock icons of the era like Stevie Wonder, Chaka Khan, Aretha Franklin, and Led Zeppelin, she became known for her soulful, powerful vocals, and soon graduated to other bands, including Raggs in 1980, the Doug Maynard Band, the T.C. Jammers, the Peterson-Cox Band (with Patty Peterson), Rupert's Orchestra and, in 1987, Dr. Mambo's Combo (often referred to simply as "the Combo"). She has won numerous Minnesota Music Awards for her contributions to the Twin Cities music scene.

She also sang on a local Bar Wars compilation LP and on the final Lipps, Inc album, 1983's 4.

== Ta Mara and The Seen ==
In 1985 Cox formed a band called The Seen and was noticed by Jesse Johnson, guitarist with Minneapolis band The Time. Johnson renamed Cox "Ta Mara" and helped the band sign a deal with A&M. He also produced their first album, Ta Mara and the Seen, and co-wrote all of the songs. The band had one major hit with "Everybody Dance" but in 1989 they broke up after releasing their next album, Blueberry Gossip.

== Work with Prince ==
Cox worked with the artist Prince, but she was not a member of The New Power Generation. In the early 1990s, she recorded more than 25 songs with Prince for a band to be called M.C. Flash, although the album was never released. She also covered Prince's "Standing at the Altar" for his 1994 compilation album 1-800-NEW-FUNK, and the song was released as a single.

== Later work ==
Cox co-wrote "I Need You" with Johnson, which appeared on Paula Abdul's 1988 album Forever Your Girl.

In 2003 she released her first solo album Margie's Little Demo.

Cox performed with the band Dr. Mambo's Combo for 38 years before announcing her retirement in August 2025.

== See also ==
- Jesse Johnson
