= E-commerce =

Type of business industry usually conducted over the internet

E-commerce (electronic commerce) refers to commercial activities including the electronic buying or selling products and services which are conducted on online platforms or over the Internet. E-commerce draws on technologies such as mobile commerce, electronic funds transfer, supply chain management, Internet marketing, online transaction processing, electronic data interchange (EDI), inventory management systems, and automated data collection systems. It is the largest segment of the electronics industry and is in turn driven by the technological advances of the semiconductor industry.

== Defining e-commerce ==
The term was coined and first employed by Robert Jacobson, Principal Consultant to the California State Assembly's Utilities & Commerce Committee, in the title and text of California's Electronic Commerce Act, carried by the late Committee Chairwoman Gwen Moore (D-L.A.) and enacted in 1984.

E-commerce typically uses the web for at least a part of a transaction's life cycle although it may also use other technologies such as e-mail. Typical e-commerce transactions include the purchase of products (such as books from Amazon) or services (such as music downloads in the form of digital distribution such as the iTunes Store). There are three areas of e-commerce: online retailing, electronic markets, and online auctions. E-commerce is supported by electronic business. The existence value of e-commerce is to allow consumers to shop online and pay online through the Internet, saving the time and space of customers and enterprises, greatly improving transaction efficiency, especially for busy office workers, and also saving a lot of valuable time.

E-commerce businesses may also employ some or all of the following:

- Online shopping for retail sales direct to consumers via web sites and mobile apps, conversational commerce via live chat, chatbots, and voice assistants.
- Providing or participating in online marketplaces, which process third-party business-to-consumer (B2C) or consumer-to-consumer (C2C) sales. Drop shipping is commonplace in such operations.
- Business-to-business (B2B) buying and selling. B2B, or what is referred to as business-to-business is defined by the Cambridge dictionary as business arrangements or trade between different businesses, rather than between businesses and the general public.
- Direct-to-Consumer (D2C) sales, in which manufactures or brands sell directly to end customers without traditional retail intermediaries. This model has expanded rapidly with the growth of digital storefronts and social commerce platforms such as Shopify, TikTok Shop, and Instagram Checkout.
- Data-driven marketing, gathering demographic and behavioral data through web analytics and social media.
- B2B electronic data interchange.
- Marketing to prospective and established customers by e-mail or fax (for example, with newsletters).
- Engaging in pretail for launching new products and services.
- Online financial exchanges for currency exchanges or trading purposes.

There are five essential categories of e-commerce:

- Business-to-Business
- Business to Consumer Retail
- Business to Government
- Consumer-to-business
- Consumer to Consumer
- Direct-to-Consumer

== Forms ==
Contemporary electronic commerce can be classified into two categories. The first category is business based on types of goods sold (involves everything from ordering "digital" content for immediate online consumption, to ordering conventional goods and services, to "meta" services to facilitate other types of electronic commerce). The second category is based on the nature of the participant (B2B, B2C, C2B and C2C).

On the institutional level, big corporations and financial institutions use the internet to exchange financial data to facilitate domestic and international business. Data integrity and security are pressing issues for electronic commerce.

Aside from traditional e-commerce, the terms m-Commerce (mobile commerce) as well (around 2013) t-Commerce have also been used.

== Governmental regulation ==
In the United States, California's Electronic Commerce Act (1984), enacted by the Legislature, the more recent California Privacy Rights Act (2020), enacted through a popular election proposition and to control specifically how electronic commerce may be conducted in California. In the US in its entirety, electronic commerce activities are regulated more broadly by the Federal Trade Commission (FTC). These activities include the use of commercial e-mails, online advertising and consumer privacy. The CAN-SPAM Act of 2003 establishes national standards for direct marketing over e-mail. The Federal Trade Commission Act regulates all forms of advertising, including online advertising, and states that advertising must be truthful and non-deceptive. Using its authority under Section 5 of the FTC Act, which prohibits unfair or deceptive practices, the FTC has brought a number of cases to enforce the promises in corporate privacy statements, including promises about the security of consumers' personal information. As a result, any corporate privacy policy related to e-commerce activity may be subject to enforcement by the FTC.

The Ryan Haight Online Pharmacy Consumer Protection Act of 2008, which came into law in 2008, amends the Controlled Substances Act to address online pharmacies.

Conflict of laws in cyberspace is a major hurdle for harmonization of legal framework for e-commerce around the world. In order to give a uniformity to e-commerce law around the world, many countries adopted the UNCITRAL Model Law on Electronic Commerce (1996).

Internationally there is the International Consumer Protection and Enforcement Network (ICPEN), which was formed in 1991 from an informal network of government customer fair trade organisations. The purpose was stated as being to find ways of co-operating on tackling consumer problems connected with cross-border transactions in both goods and services, and to help ensure exchanges of information among the participants for mutual benefit and understanding. From this came Econsumer.gov, an ICPEN initiative since April 2001. It is a portal to report complaints about online and related transactions with foreign companies.

There is also Asia Pacific Economic Cooperation. APEC was established in 1989 with the vision of achieving stability, security and prosperity for the region through free and open trade and investment. APEC has an Electronic Commerce Steering Group as well as working on common privacy regulations throughout the APEC region.

In Australia, trade is covered under Australian Treasury Guidelines for electronic commerce and the Australian Competition & Consumer Commission regulates and offers advice on how to deal with businesses online, and offers specific advice on what happens if things go wrong.

The European Union undertook an extensive enquiry into e-commerce in 2015–16 which observed significant growth in the development of e-commerce, along with some developments which raised concerns, such as increased use of selective distribution systems, which allow manufacturers to control routes to market, and "increased use of contractual restrictions to better control product distribution". The European Commission felt that some emerging practices might be justified if they could improve the quality of product distribution, but "others may unduly prevent consumers from benefiting from greater product choice and lower prices in e-commerce and therefore warrant Commission action" in order to promote compliance with EU competition rules.

In the United Kingdom, the Financial Services Authority (FSA) was formerly the regulating authority for most aspects of the EU's Payment Services Directive (PSD), until its replacement in 2013 by the Prudential Regulation Authority and the Financial Conduct Authority. The UK implemented the PSD through the Payment Services Regulations 2009 (PSRs), which came into effect on 1 November 2009. The PSR affects firms providing payment services and their customers. These firms include banks, non-bank credit card issuers and non-bank merchant acquirers, e-money issuers, etc. The PSRs created a new class of regulated firms known as payment institutions (PIs), who are subject to prudential requirements. Article 87 of the PSD required the European Commission to report on the implementation and impact of the PSD by 1 November 2012.

In India, the Information Technology Act 2000 governs the basic applicability of e-commerce.

In China, the Telecommunications Regulations of the People's Republic of China (promulgated on 25 September 2000), stipulated the Ministry of Industry and Information Technology (MIIT) as the government department regulating all telecommunications related activities, including electronic commerce. On the same day, the Administrative Measures on Internet Information Services were released, the first administrative regulations to address profit-generating activities conducted through the Internet, and lay the foundation for future regulations governing e-commerce in China. On 28 August 2004, the eleventh session of the tenth NPC Standing Committee adopted an Electronic Signature Law, which regulates data message, electronic signature authentication and legal liability issues. It is considered the first law in China's e-commerce legislation. It was a milestone in the course of improving China's electronic commerce legislation, and also marks the entering of China's rapid development stage for electronic commerce legislation.

== Global trends ==
E-commerce has become an important tool for small and large businesses worldwide, not only to sell to customers, but also to engage them.

Cross-border e-Commerce is also an essential field for e-Commerce businesses. It has responded to the trend of globalization. It shows that numerous firms have opened up new businesses, expanded new markets, and overcome trade barriers; more and more enterprises have started exploring the cross-border cooperation field. In addition, compared with traditional cross-border trade, the information on cross-border e-commerce is more concealed. In the era of globalization, cross-border e-commerce for inter-firm companies means the activities, interactions, or social relations of two or more e-commerce enterprises. However, the success of cross-border e-commerce promotes the development of small and medium-sized firms, and it has finally become a new transaction mode. It has helped the companies solve financial problems and realize the reasonable allocation of resources field. SMEs (small and medium enterprises) can also precisely match the demand and supply in the market, having the industrial chain majorization and creating more revenues for companies.

In 2012, e-commerce sales topped $1 trillion for the first time in history.

Mobile devices are playing an increasing role in the mix of e-commerce, this is also commonly called mobile commerce, or m-commerce. In 2014, one estimate saw purchases made on mobile devices making up 25% of the market by 2017.

For traditional businesses, one research stated that information technology and cross-border e-commerce is a good opportunity for the rapid development and growth of enterprises. Many companies have invested an enormous volume of investment in mobile applications. The DeLone and McLean Model stated that three perspectives contribute to a successful e-business: information system quality, service quality and users' satisfaction. There is no limit of time and space, there are more opportunities to reach out to customers around the world, and to cut down unnecessary intermediate links, thereby reducing the cost price, and can benefit from one on one large customer data analysis, to achieve a high degree of personal customization strategic plan, in order to fully enhance the core competitiveness of the products in the company.

Modern 3D graphics technologies, such as Facebook 3D Posts, are considered by some social media marketers and advertisers as a preferable way to promote consumer goods than static photos, and some brands like Sony are already paving the way for augmented reality commerce. Wayfair now lets you inspect a 3D version of its furniture in a home setting before buying.

=== China ===
Among emerging economies, China's e-commerce presence continued to expand every year. With 668 million Internet users as of 2014, China's online shopping sales reached $253 billion in the first half of 2015, accounting for 10% of total Chinese consumer retail sales in that period. The Chinese retailers have been able to help consumers feel more comfortable shopping online. e-commerce transactions between China and other countries increased 32% to 2.3 trillion yuan ($375.8 billion) in 2012 and accounted for 9.6% of China's total international trade. In 2013, Alibaba had an e-commerce market share of 80% in China. In 2014, Alibaba still dominated the B2B marketplace in China with a market share of 44.82%, followed by several other companies including Made-in-China.com at 3.21%, and GlobalSources.com at 2.98%, with the total transaction value of China's B2B market exceeding 4.5 billion yuan. In 2012, Alibaba Group delisted Alibaba.com from the Hong Kong stock exchange after acquiring full control. In 2014, it was privately held again following a $2.5 billion buyback. The company's NYSE debut under the stock ticker BABA made headlines for being, at that time, the biggest IPO in U.S. history. Alibaba's International Digital Commerce Group (AIDC), which includes Alibaba.com's B2B operations, reported 22% year-over-year revenue growth in the quarter ending March 31, 2025 (Q4 FY2025).

China was also the largest e-commerce market in the world by value of sales, with an estimated US$899 billion in 2016. It accounted for 42.4% of worldwide retail e-commerce in that year, the most of any country. Research shows that Chinese consumer motivations are different enough from Western audiences to require unique e-commerce app designs instead of simply porting Western apps into the Chinese market.

The expansion of e-commerce in China has resulted in the development of Taobao villages, clusters of e-commerce businesses operating in rural areas. Because Taobao villages have increased the incomes or rural people and entrepreneurship in rural China, Taobao villages have become a component of rural revitalization strategies.

In 2015, the State Council promoted the Internet Plus initiative, a five-year plan to integrate traditional manufacturing and service industries with big data, cloud computing, and Internet of things technology. The State Council provided support for Internet Plus through policy support in area including cross-border e-commerce and rural e-commerce.

In 2019, the city of Hangzhou established a pilot program artificial intelligence-based Internet Court to adjudicate disputes related to e-commerce and internet-related intellectual property claims.

=== Europe ===
In 2010, the United Kingdom had the highest per capita e-commerce spending in the world. As of 2013, the Czech Republic was the European country where e-commerce delivers the biggest contribution to the enterprises' total revenue. Almost a quarter (24%) of the country's total turnover is generated via the online channel.

=== Arab states ===
The rate of growth of the number of internet users in the Arab countries has been rapid – 13.1% in 2015. A significant portion of the e-commerce market in the Middle East comprises people in the 30–34 year age group. Egypt has the largest number of internet users in the region, followed by Saudi Arabia and Morocco; these constitute 3/4th of the region's share. Yet, internet penetration is low: 35% in Egypt and 65% in Saudi Arabia.

The Gulf Cooperation Council countries have a rapidly growing market and are characterized by a population that becomes wealthier (Yuldashev). As such, retailers have launched Arabic-language websites as a means to target this population. Secondly, there are predictions of increased mobile purchases and an expanding internet audience (Yuldashev). The growth and development of the two aspects make the GCC countries become larger players in the electronic commerce market with time progress. Specifically, research shows that the e-commerce market was expected to grow to over $20 billion by 2020 among these GCC countries (Yuldashev). The e-commerce market has also gained much popularity among western countries, and in particular Europe and the U.S. These countries have been highly characterized by consumer-packaged goods (CPG) (Geisler, 34). However, trends show that there are future signs of a reverse. Similar to the GCC countries, there has been increased purchase of goods and services in online channels rather than offline channels. Activist investors are trying hard to consolidate and slash their overall cost and the governments in western countries continue to impose more regulation on CPG manufacturers (Geisler, 36). In these senses, CPG investors are being forced to adapt to e-commerce as it is effective as well as a means for them to thrive.

The future trends in the GCC countries will be similar to that of the western countries. Despite the forces that push business to adapt e-commerce as a means to sell goods and products, the manner in which customers make purchases is similar in countries from these two regions. For instance, there has been an increased usage of smartphones which comes in conjunction with an increase in the overall internet audience from the regions. Yuldashev writes that consumers are scaling up to more modern technology that allows for mobile marketing. However, the percentage of smartphone and internet users who make online purchases is expected to vary in the first few years. It will be independent on the willingness of the people to adopt this new trend (The Statistics Portal). For example, UAE has the greatest smartphone penetration of 73.8 per cent and has 91.9 per cent of its population has access to the internet. On the other hand, smartphone penetration in Europe has been reported to be at 64.7 per cent (The Statistics Portal). Regardless, the disparity in percentage between these regions is expected to level out in future because e-commerce technology is expected to grow to allow for more users.

The e-commerce business within these two regions will result in competition. Government bodies at the country level will enhance their measures and strategies to ensure sustainability and consumer protection (Krings, et al.). These increased measures will raise the environmental and social standards in the countries, factors that will determine the success of the e-commerce market in these countries. For example, an adoption of tough sanctions will make it difficult for companies to enter the e-commerce market while lenient sanctions will allow ease of companies. As such, the future trends between GCC countries and the Western countries will be independent of these sanctions (Krings, et al.). These countries need to make rational conclusions in coming up with effective sanctions.

=== India ===
India had an Internet user base of about 460 million as of December 2017. Despite being the third largest user base in the world, the penetration of the Internet is low compared to markets like the United States, United Kingdom or France but is growing at a much faster rate, adding around six million new entrants every month. In India, cash on delivery is the most preferred payment method, accumulating 75% of the e-retail activities. The India retail market was expected to rise from 2.5% in 2016 to 5% in 2020.

=== Brazil ===
In 2013, Brazil's e-commerce was growing quickly with retail e-commerce sales expected to grow at a double-digit pace through 2014. By 2016, eMarketer expected retail e-commerce sales in Brazil to reach $17.3 billion.

== Logistics ==
Logistics in e-commerce mainly concerns fulfillment. Online markets and retailers have to find the best possible way to fill orders and deliver products. Small companies usually control their own logistic operation because they do not have the ability to hire an outside company. Most large companies hire a fulfillment service that takes care of a company's logistic needs. The optimization of logistics processes that contains long-term investment in an efficient storage infrastructure system and adoption of inventory management strategies is crucial to prioritize customer satisfaction throughout the entire process, from order placement to final delivery.

== Impacts ==
=== Impact on markets and retailers ===
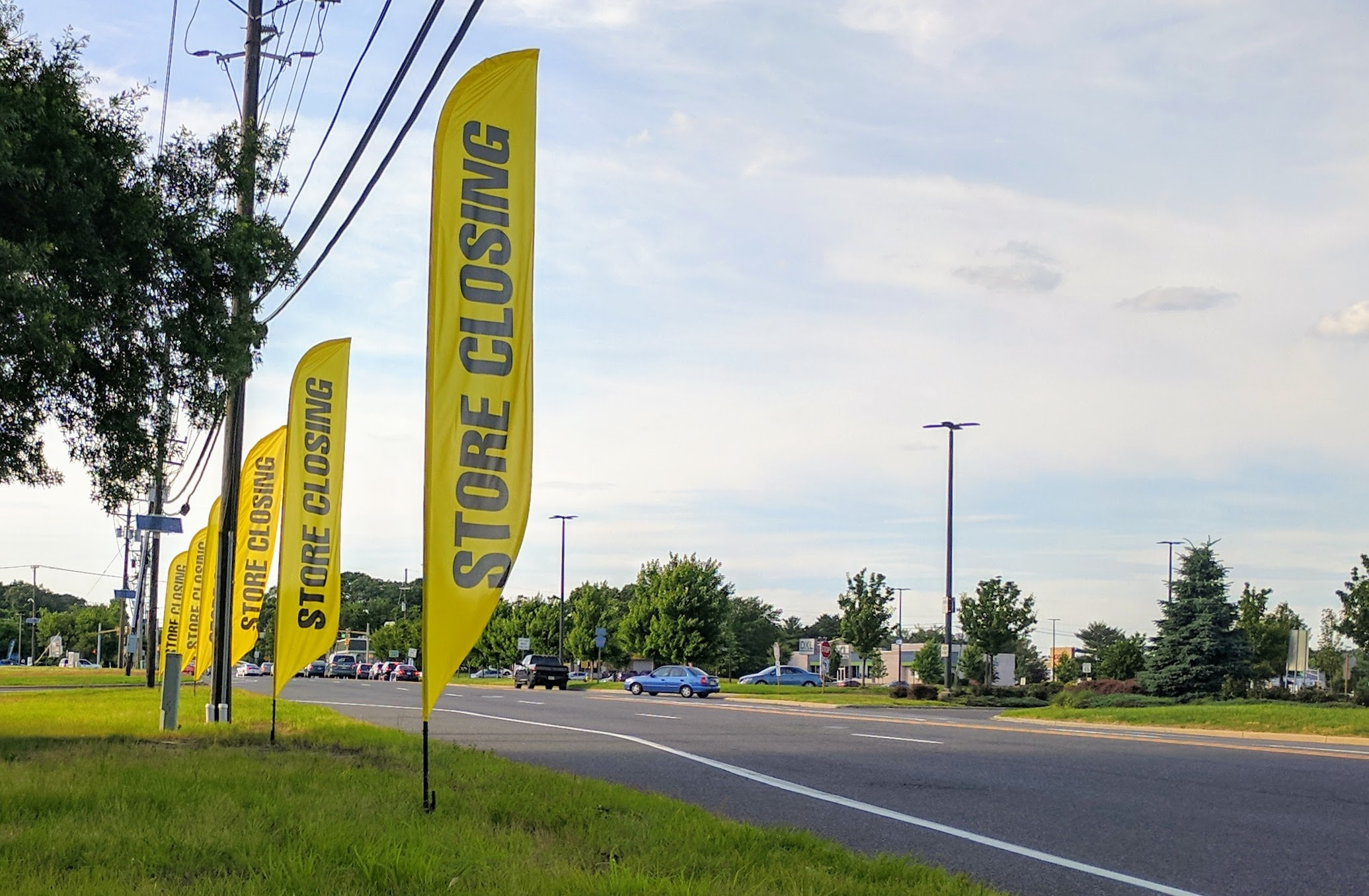
Store closing flags outside a Toys R Us in Deptford, New Jersey. Despite investments, the chain struggled to win market share in the age of digital commerce.

E-commerce markets grew at noticeable rates. The online market was expected to grow by 56% in 2015–2020. In 2017, retail e-commerce sales worldwide amounted to 2.3 trillion US dollars and e-retail revenues were projected to grow to 4.891 trillion US dollars in 2021. Traditional markets were only expected 2% growth during the same time. Brick and mortar retailers are struggling because of online retailer's ability to offer lower prices and higher efficiency. Many larger retailers are able to maintain a presence offline and online by linking physical and online offerings.

E-commerce allows customers to overcome geographical barriers and to purchase products anytime and from anywhere. Online and traditional markets have different strategies. Traditional retailers offer fewer assortment of products because of shelf space where. Online retailers often hold no inventory but send customer orders directly to the manufacturer. Dropshipping is a means of shipping goods from a manufacturer or wholesaler directly to a customer instead of to a retailer. This process results in the vendor not holding any stock but serving as an intermediary between the buyer and the third-party supplier. The dropshipping market is expected to reach $1.51 Tn by 2032, according to a Global Market Insights report, which studied the main dropshipping markets, including Alibaba.com, Chinabrands.com, Doba, Printful, Salehoo, Shopify, and Spocket. The pricing strategies are also different for traditional and online retailers. Traditional retailers base their prices on store traffic and the cost to keep inventory. Online retailers base prices on the speed of delivery.

E-commerce merchants may operate fully online, or online along with a brick and mortar store. Online marketers can offer lower prices, greater product selection, and high efficiency rates. Many customers prefer online markets if the products can be delivered quickly at relatively low price. However, online retailers cannot offer the physical experience that traditional retailers can. It can be difficult to judge the quality of a product without the physical experience, which may cause customers to experience product or seller uncertainty. Another issue regarding the online market is concerns about the security of online transactions. Many customers remain loyal to well-known retailers because of this issue.

Security is a primary problem for e-commerce in developed and developing countries. E-commerce security is protecting businesses' websites and customers from unauthorized access, use, alteration, or destruction. Threats include: malicious codes, unwanted programs (ad ware, spyware), phishing, hacking, and cyber vandalism. Tools to avert these threats include firewalls, encryption software, digital certificates, and passwords.

=== Impact on supply chain management ===
For a long time, companies had been troubled by the gap between the benefits which supply chain technology has and the solutions to deliver those benefits. However, the emergence of e-commerce has provided a more practical and effective way of delivering the benefits of the new supply chain technologies.

E-commerce has the capability to integrate all inter-company and intra-company functions, meaning that the three flows (physical flow, financial flow and information flow) of the supply chain could be also affected by e-commerce. The affections on physical flows improved the way of product and inventory movement level for companies. For the information flows, e-commerce optimized the capacity of information processing than companies used to have, and for the financial flows, e-commerce allows companies to have more efficient payment and settlement solutions.

In addition, e-commerce has a more sophisticated level of impact on supply chains: Firstly, the performance gap will be eliminated since companies can identify gaps between different levels of supply chains by electronic means of solutions; Secondly, as a result of e-commerce emergence, new capabilities such implementing ERP systems, like SAP ERP, Xero, or Megaventory, have helped companies to manage operations with customers and suppliers. Yet these new capabilities are still not fully exploited. Thirdly, technology companies would keep investing on new e-commerce software solutions as they are expecting investment return. Fourthly, e-commerce would help to solve many aspects of issues that companies may feel difficult to cope with, such as political barriers or cross-country changes. Finally, e-commerce provides companies a more efficient and effective way to collaborate with each other within the supply chain.

=== Impact on employment ===
E-commerce helps create new job opportunities due to information related services, software app and digital products. It also causes job losses. The areas with the greatest predicted job-loss are retail, postal, and travel agencies. The development of e-commerce will create jobs that require highly skilled workers to manage large amounts of information, customer demands, and production processes. In contrast, people with poor technical skills cannot enjoy the wages welfare. On the other hand, because e-commerce requires sufficient stocks that could be delivered to customers in time, the warehouse becomes an important element. Warehouse needs more staff to manage, supervise and organize, thus the condition of warehouse environment will be concerned by employees.

=== Impact on customers ===
E-commerce brings convenience for customers as they do not have to leave home and only need to browse websites online, especially for buying products which are not sold in nearby shops. It could help customers buy a wider range of products and save customers' time. Consumers also gain power through online shopping. They are able to research products and compare prices among retailers. Thanks to the practice of user-generated ratings and reviews from companies like Bazaarvoice, Trustpilot, and Yelp, customers can also see what other people think of a product, and decide before buying if they want to spend money on it. Also, online shopping often provides sales promotion or discounts code, thus it is more price effective for customers. Moreover, e-commerce provides products' detailed information; even the in-store staff cannot offer such detailed explanation. Customers can also review and track the order history online.

E-commerce technologies cut transaction costs by allowing both manufactures and consumers to skip through the intermediaries. This is achieved through by extending the search area best price deals and by group purchase. The success of e-commerce in urban and regional levels depend on how the local firms and consumers have adopted to e-commerce.

However, e-commerce lacks human interaction for customers, especially who prefer face-to-face connection. Customers are also concerned with the security of online transactions and tend to remain loyal to well-known retailers. In recent years, clothing retailers such as Tommy Hilfiger have started adding Virtual Fit platforms to their e-commerce sites to reduce the risk of customers buying the wrong sized clothes, although these vary greatly in their fit for purpose. When the customer regret the purchase of a product, it involves returning goods and refunding process. This process is inconvenient as customers need to pack and post the goods. If the products are expensive, large or fragile, it refers to safety issues.

=== Impact on the environment ===
In 2018, E-commerce generated 1.3 million short tons (1.2 megatonnes) of container cardboard in North America, an increase from 1.1 million (1.00)) in 2017. Only 35 percent of North American cardboard manufacturing capacity was from recycled content. The recycling rate in Europe was 80 percent and Asia was 93 percent. Amazon, the largest user of boxes, had a strategy to cut back on packing material and reduced packaging material used by 19 percent by weight since 2016. Amazon is requiring retailers to manufacture their product packaging in a way that does not require additional shipping packaging. Amazon also has an 85-person team researching ways to reduce and improve their packaging and shipping materials.

Accelerated movement of packages around the world includes accelerated movement of living things, such as invasive species. Weeds, pests, and diseases all sometimes travel in packages of seeds. Some of these packages are part of brushing manipulation of e-commerce reviews.

=== Impact on traditional retail ===
E-commerce has been cited as a major force for the failure of major U.S. retailers in a trend frequently referred to as a "retail apocalypse." The rise of e-commerce outlets like Amazon has made it harder for traditional retailers to attract customers to their stores and forced companies to change their sales strategies. Many companies have turned to sales promotions and increased digital efforts to lure shoppers while shutting down brick-and-mortar locations. The trend has forced some traditional retailers to shutter its brick and mortar operations.

== E-commerce during COVID-19 ==
In March 2020, global retail website traffic hit 14.3 billion visits signifying an unprecedented growth of e-commerce during the lockdown of 2020. Later studies show that online sales increased by 25% and online grocery shopping increased by over 100% during the crisis in the United States. Meanwhile, as many as 29% of surveyed shoppers state that they will never go back to shopping in person again; in the UK, 43% of consumers state that they expect to keep on shopping the same way even after the lockdown is over.

== Business application ==
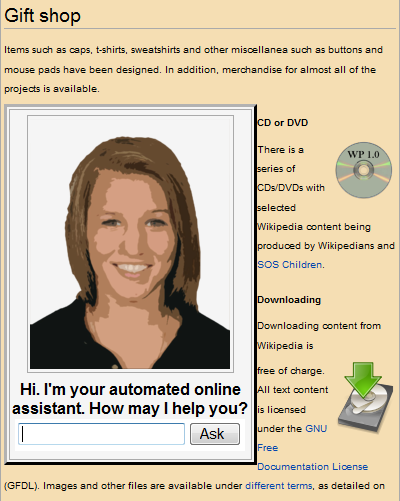
An example of an older generation of avatar-style automated online assistant on a merchandising website

Some common applications related to electronic commerce are:

- B2B e-commerce (business-to-business)
- B2C e-commerce (business-to-consumer)
- Conversational commerce: e-commerce via chat
- Digital Wallet
- Document automation in supply chain and logistics
- Electronic tickets
- Enterprise content management
- Group buying
- Instant messaging
- Internet security
- Online auction
- Online banking
- Online office suites
- Online shopping and order tracking
- Online transaction processing
- Pretail
- Print on demand
- Shopping cart software
- Social networking
- Teleconference
- Usenet newsgroup
- Virtual assistant
- Domestic and international payment systems

== Timeline ==
A timeline for the development of e-commerce:

- 1971 or 1972: The ARPANET is used to arrange a cannabis sale between students at the Stanford Artificial Intelligence Laboratory and the Massachusetts Institute of Technology, later described as "the seminal act of e-commerce" in John Markoff's book What the Dormouse Said.
- 1979: Michael Aldrich demonstrates the first online shopping system.
- 1981: Thomson Holidays UK is the first business-to-business (B2B) online shopping system to be installed.
- 1982: Minitel was introduced nationwide in France by France Télécom and used for online ordering.
- 1983: California State Assembly holds first hearing on "electronic commerce" in Volcano, California. Testifying are CPUC, MCI Mail, Prodigy, CompuServe, Volcano Telephone, and Pacific Telesis. (Not permitted to testify is Quantum Technology, later to become AOL.) California's Electronic Commerce Act was passed in 1984.
- 1983: Karen Earle Lile (AKA Karen Bean) and Kendall Ross Bean create e-commerce service in San Francisco Bay Area. Buyers and sellers of pianos connect through a database created by Piano Finders on a Kaypro personal computer. Pianos for sale are listed on a Bulletin board system. Buyers print list of pianos for sale by a dot matrix printer. Customer service happened through a Piano Advice Hotline listed in the San Francisco Chronicle classified ads and money transferred by a bank wire transfer when a sale was completed.
- 1984: Gateshead SIS/Tesco is first B2C online shopping system and Mrs Snowball, 72, is the first online home shopper
- 1984: In April 1984, CompuServe launches the Electronic Mall in the US and Canada. It is the first comprehensive electronic commerce service.
- 1989: In May 1989, Sequoia Data Corp. introduced Compumarket, the first internet based system for e-commerce. Sellers and buyers could post items for sale and buyers could search the database and make purchases with a credit card.
- 1990: Tim Berners-Lee writes the first web browser, WorldWideWeb, using a NeXT computer.
- 1991: J.H. Snider and Terra Ziporyn's Future Shop: How New Technologies Will Change The Way We Shop and What We Buy is published by St. Martin's Press.
- 1992: Book Stacks Unlimited in Cleveland opens a commercial sales website (www.books.com) selling books online with credit card processing.
- 1993: Paget Press releases edition No. 3 of the first app store, The Electronic AppWrapper
- 1994: Netscape releases the Navigator browser in October under the code name Mozilla. Netscape 1.0 is introduced in late 1994 with SSL encryption that made transactions secure.
- 1994: Ipswitch IMail Server becomes the first software available online for sale and immediate download via a partnership between Ipswitch, Inc. and OpenMarket.
- 1994: "Ten Summoner's Tales" by Sting becomes the first secure online purchase through NetMarket.
- 1995: The US National Science Foundation lifts its former strict prohibition of commercial enterprise on the Internet.
- 1995: Thursday 27 April 1995, the purchase of a book by Paul Stanfield, product manager for CompuServe UK, from W H Smith's shop within CompuServe's UK Shopping Centre is the UK's first national online shopping service secure transaction. The shopping service at launch featured W H Smith, Tesco, Virgin Megastores/Our Price, Great Universal Stores (GUS), Interflora, Dixons Retail, Past Times, PC World (retailer) and Innovations.
- 1995: Amazon is launched by Jeff Bezos.
- 1995: eBay is founded by computer programmer Pierre Omidyar as AuctionWeb. It is the first online auction site supporting person-to-person transactions.
- 1995: The first commercial-free 24-hour, internet-only radio stations, Radio HK and NetRadio start broadcasting.
- 1996: The use of Excalibur BBS with replicated "storefronts" was an early implementation of electronic commerce started by a group of SysOps in Australia and replicated to global partner sites.
- 1998: Electronic postal stamps can be purchased and downloaded for printing from the Web.
- 1999: Alibaba Group is established in China. Business.com sold for US$7.5 million to eCompanies, which was purchased in 1997 for US$149,000. The peer-to-peer filesharing software Napster launches. ATG Stores launches to sell decorative items for the home online.
- 1999: Global e-commerce reaches $150 billion
- 2000: The dot-com bust.
- 2001: eBay has the largest userbase of any e-commerce site.
- 2001: Alibaba.com achieved profitability in December 2001.
- 2002: eBay acquires PayPal for $1.5 billion. Niche retail companies Wayfair and NetShops are founded with the concept of selling products through several targeted domains, rather than a central portal.
- 2003: Amazon posts first yearly profit.
- 2004: DHgate.com, China's first online B2B transaction platform, is established, forcing other B2B sites to move away from the "yellow pages" model.
- 2007: Business.com acquired by R.H. Donnelley for $345 million.
- 2014: US e-commerce and online retail sales projected to reach $294 billion, an increase of 12 percent over 2013 and 9% of all retail sales. Alibaba Group has the largest Initial public offering ever, worth $25 billion.
- 2015: Amazon accounts for more than half of all e-commerce growth, selling almost 500 Million SKU's in the US.
- 2016: The Government of India launches the BHIM UPI digital payment interface. In the year 2020 it had 2 billion digital payment transactions.
- 2017: Retail e-commerce sales across the world reaches $2.304 trillion, which was a 24.8 percent increase than previous year.
- 2017: Global e-commerce transactions generate $29.267 trillion, including $25.516 trillion for business-to-business (B2B) transactions and $3.851 trillion for business-to-consumer (B2C) sales.

== See also ==
- Comparison of free software e-commerce web application frameworks
- Comparison of shopping cart software
- Customer intelligence
- Digital economy
- E-commerce credit card payment system
- Electronic bill payment
- Electronic money
- Non-store retailing
- Online shopping
- Payments as a service
- South Dakota v. Wayfair, Inc.
- Types of e-commerce
- Timeline of e-commerce
