= NetRadio =

NetRadio (Net.radio, NetRadio, NetRadio Network) was an Eden Prairie, Minnesota-based company founded by Scott Bourne and radio veteran Scot Combs in 1994. NetRadio helped pioneer online radio and was the world's first Internet-only radio network. NetRadio began using RealAudio 1.0 in November 1995 to stream their music. It started out with four formats and expanded to more than a dozen two years after. The radio network was included as a preset in RealAudio (aka RealMedia) 2.0 and later players. NetRadio was the first Internet radio network to receive an experimental license from ASCAP which later became a standard license for all online radio stations. At its height, NetRadio offered more than 125 online radio stations and attracted more than 50 million unique IP's per month. When Arbitron began rating Internet radio sites, NetRadio consistently held 8 of the top 10 ranks. In 1997, the Navarre Corporation completed the purchase of all outstanding shares of NetRadio and merged the company into one of its subsidiaries. In late 2001 it discontinued operations.

== World's First live Internet Concert Series ==
In July 1996, NetRadio accomplished another first by offering the first weekly live Internet-only concert series hosted by NetRadio Webmaster Nathan Wright. Some of the shows included:

- Dr. Mambos Combo 1/16/96 (first live concert via internet out of Minnesota?)
- Dr. Mambos Combo 5/18/96
- Tribe of Millions 5/18/96
- Tommy Babarella 5/18/96
- Innocent 5/18/96
- Paul Metsa 6/19/96
- 5 Guys Live 6//19/96
- Gutta Percha 6/12/96
- Michael Nelson 6/26/96
- Ride Ruby Ride 6/26/96
- Six Day Lane 7/3/96
- Sadie Foster 7/3/96
- Scott Laurent 7/10/96 (possibly The Billy's also?)
- Joint Chiefs at the Hangout (8 songs) 7/17/96
- Hindu Rodeo 7/24/96
- Stuart Davis 7/24/96
- GB Leighton 7/31/96
- Johnny Clueless 7/31/96
- Cartoon Water 8/7/96
- Mango Jam 8/7/96
- Trailer Trash 8/14/96 may be unlabeled.
- Honeydogs 8/14/96 may be unlabeled.
- Charlies Cafe 8/21/96
- Hillcats 8/21/96
- Punchdrunk 8/28/96
- Rank Strangers 8/28/96
- Wood circa 1996
- Medium
