= Emerson Mancini =

American mastering engineer

Emerson Mancini is an American mastering engineer based in Los Angeles. He (Note: Mancini uses the pronouns he/him and they/them. This article uses he/him for consistency.) has mastered songs and albums for numerous artists, including Jon Batiste, Camila Cabello, The Chainsmokers, Halsey, Kendrick Lamar, Lizzo, Migos, Paramore, Portugal. The Man, Charlie Puth, Bebe Rexha, and Ed Sheeran. For his engineering work, Mancini has been nominated for seven Grammy Awards, winning Record of the Year for Lizzo's "About Damn Time" and Album of the Year for Batiste's We Are. Additionally, he has worked on film and television soundtracks, including Top Gun: Maverick.

== Life and career ==
Mancini was raised in Long Island, New York, a first-generation American born to Argentine parents. He took an interest in music at an early age, learning piano, flute, and guitar throughout his childhood and schooling. Inspired to pursue music as a career in his teenage years after attending a songwriting workshop, he attended Berklee College of Music and graduated with a Bachelor of Music in 2008.

Shortly after graduation, Mancini was hired by fellow mastering engineer Dave Kutch as an assistant at the Mastering Palace in New York, where he worked for seven years. In 2015, he founded Demifugue Mastering, which operates out of Larrabee Sound Studios in North Hollywood, Los Angeles.

Since 2008, Mancini has worked on over 1,600 releases and 2,500 songs. As of October 2022, he does not utilize analog tools for mastering and works entirely in Magix's Sequoia digital audio workstation using audio plug-ins. At the 61st Annual Grammy Awards in 2019, he received his first nomination for Best Engineered Album, Non-Classical for Chromeo's album Head over Heels, At the 2022 ceremony, he received two nominations for his work on Jon Batiste's We Are: Record of the Year for "Freedom" and Album of the Year, winning for the latter. That year, he mastered the soundtrack for the 2022 film Top Gun: Maverick. In 2023, he received four nominations at the 65th Annual Grammy Awards for his work with Lizzo and Kendrick Lamar: two for Record of the Year (Lizzo's "About Damn Time" and Lamar's "The Heart Part 5") and two for Album of the Year (Lizzo's Special and Lamar's Mr. Morale & the Big Steppers), and won for "About Damn Time". Writing for Metro Weekly, journalist Hugh McIntyre said that Mancini was "likely the first openly trans person to snag either of the two most prestigious trophies [Record of the Year and Album of the Year] at the Grammys — let alone both of them."

In July 2025, Mancini was signed to the management division of Errant Records, a Canadian independent record label.

== Personal life ==
In a guest column for Billboard, Mancini came out as a trans man in October 2022, having struggled with his gender identity "decade after decade". He credited Kendrick Lamar's "Auntie Diaries", a song from Lamar's 2022 album Mr. Morale & the Big Steppers for which Mancini served as mastering engineer, for being "[a] rap song about trans acceptance" that made him feel hopeful about his identity. He had previously received top surgery sometime in 2021, which "gave [him] a lot of space and freedom to operate". Mancini came out to Lamar's team first before reaching out to other members of the music industry. In an interview with People, Mancini said that he had not changed his legal name and was unsure if he would.

== Awards and nominations ==
=== Grammy Awards ===
Grammy awards and nominations received by Emerson Mancini
Year	Category	Nominated work	Artist(s)	Result	Ref.
2019	Best Engineered Album, Non-Classical	Head over Heels	Chromeo	Nominated	
2022	Record of the Year	"Freedom"	Jon Batiste	Nominated	
2022	Album of the Year	We Are	Jon Batiste	Won	
2023	Record of the Year	"About Damn Time"	Lizzo	Won	
2023	Record of the Year	"The Heart Part 5"	Kendrick Lamar	Nominated	
2023	Album of the Year	Special	Lizzo	Nominated	
2023	Album of the Year	Mr. Morale & the Big Steppers	Kendrick Lamar	Nominated	

=== Latin Grammy Awards ===
Latin Grammy awards and nominations received by Emerson Mancini
Year	Category	Nominated work	Artist(s)	Result	Ref.
2021	Record of the Year	"Amén"	Ricardo Montaner, Mau y Ricky, Camilo, and Evaluna Montaner	Nominated	
