= Jack Stratton (musician) =

American multi-instrumentalist (born c. 1987)

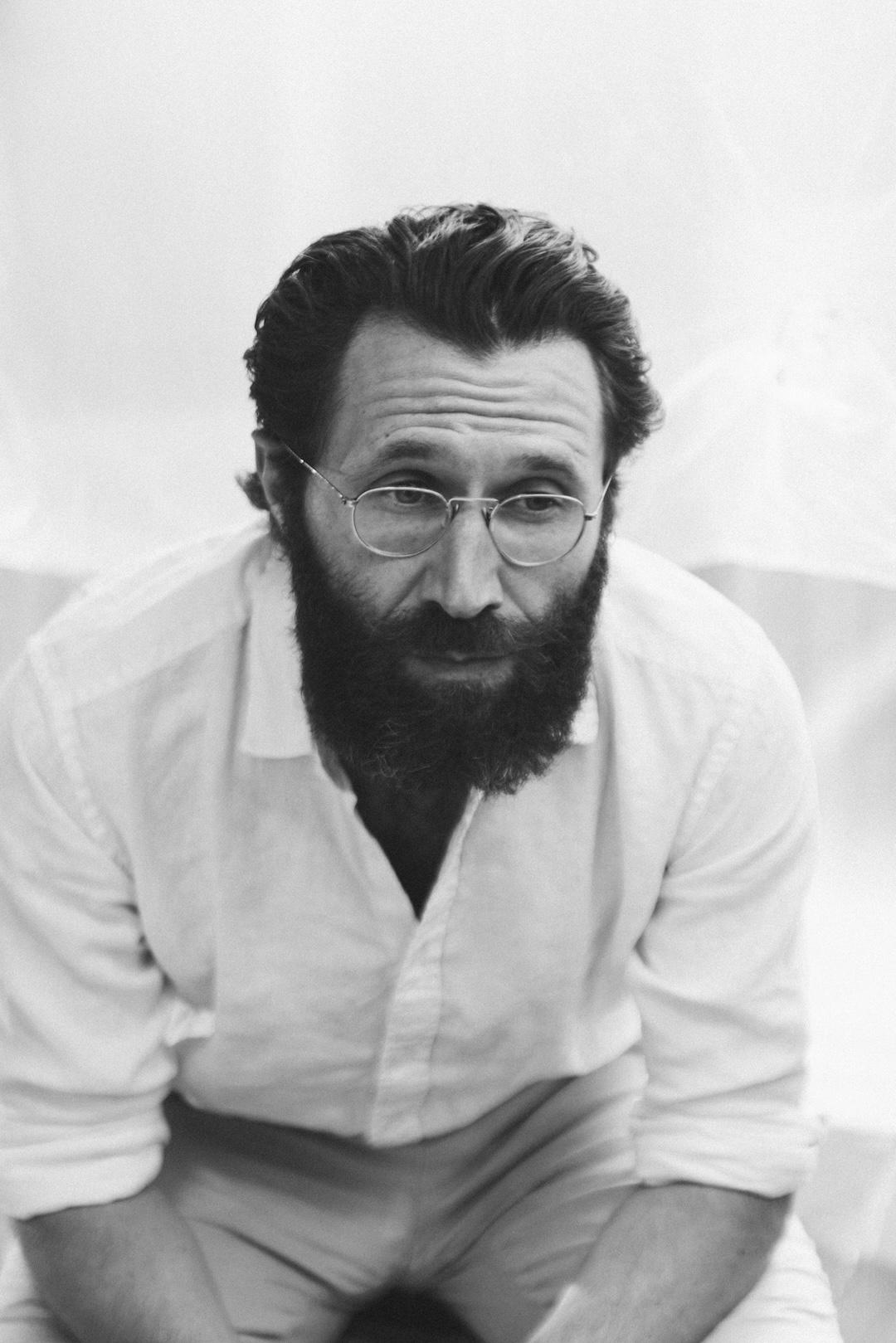
- Stratton in 2026

Background information
- Also known as: Vulfmon
- Born: c. 1987 (age 38–39); Cleveland Heights, Ohio, U.S.
- Genres: Funk; Nu-funk
- Occupations: Multi-instrumentalist; songwriter; record producer; video producer
- Instruments: Drums; percussion; piano; keyboard; guitar; bass; brass; vocals
- Years active: 2011–present
- Label: Vulf Records
- Member of: Vulfpeck; Yiddishe Pirat
- Formerly of: Groove Spoon

Jack Stratton (born c. 1987), also known by the mononym Vulfmon, is an American multi-instrumentalist, songwriter, record producer, and video producer based in Los Angeles. He is best known as the founder and bandleader of the funk band Vulfpeck. He released his first full-length album, Here We Go Jack, in 2022 and has since released three additional albums.

== Early life ==
Stratton grew up in Cleveland Heights, Ohio, and started on drums at an early age. Growing up, he played in his high school band and in his father's klezmer band. He studied performing arts technology at the University of Michigan. (Note: "All of us went to the University of Michigan in Ann Arbor. I studied recording engineering and drums.") While in college he formed a band called Groove Spoon. The band released an EP titled Live From the Dude in 2010. Early on, Stratton released several short comic-music skits. In these he performs as the fictional characters Mushy Krongold, Craigs Stewarts, and DJ Bean Ornish.

== Career ==
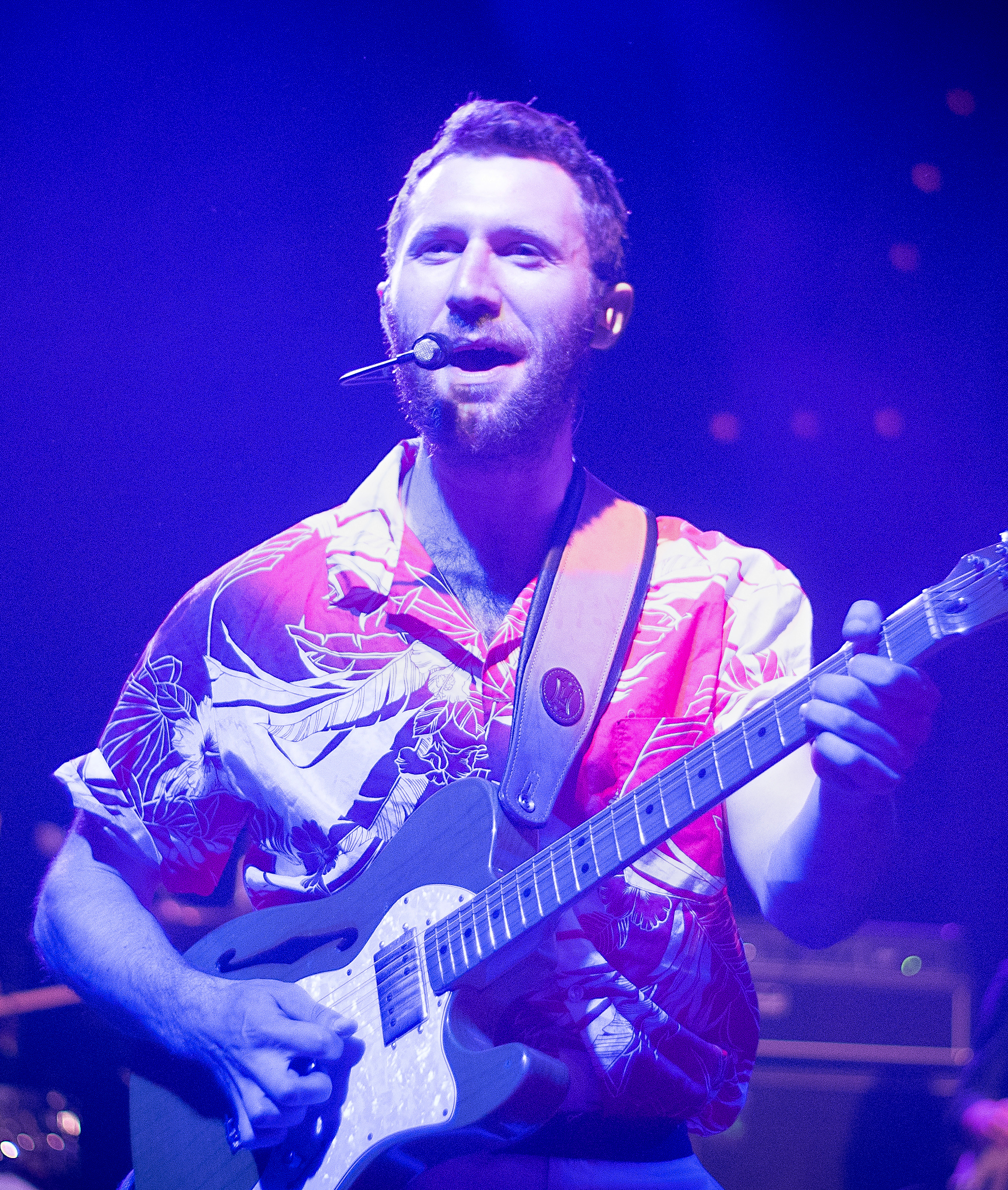
Stratton in 2017

In 2011, Stratton founded Vulfpeck. The band has released six studio albums and four extended plays. Stratton does most of the band's management and production. He first adopted the persona of Vulfmon, an old-school German record producer, to promote a Kickstarter project for the band's first vinyl record. As the band's producer, he experimented with audio compressors and helped develop the Vulf Compressor audio plug-in in collaboration with Goodhertz Inc.

In 2014, Vulfpeck released Sleepify, a silent album on Spotify. Royalties from the album (which had no audible sound) financed an admission-free tour and attracted international media coverage. In 2019, the band headlined a sold out concert at Madison Square Garden in New York City.

In 2020, Stratton performed a publicity stunt and fundraiser for Vulfpeck by auctioning the "real estate" of track 10 on Vulfpeck's album The Joy of Music, The Job of Real Estate. The rights to publish on track 10 were sold to the New York-based band Earthquake Lights. A portion of the proceeds were donated to public schools through the DonorsChoose organization.

Stratton conceived the instrumental band The Fearless Flyers, which was formed in 2018 with Stratton as producer. He produced the band's music through 2024. In 2023, he released a live album of klezmer music with the three-piece band Yiddishe Pirat consisting of Michael Winograd on clarinet, Josh Dolgin on piano, and Stratton on drums.

In 2022, Stratton released his first solo album, titled Here We Go Jack, under his mononym Vulfmon. He has since released three more albums, titled Vulfnik, Dot, and Deg. On streaming services, he categorizes his solo albums as pop and R&B/soul. (Note: Namely on the Apple Music streaming service) The albums feature contributions by Louis Cato, Jacob Jeffries, Evangeline, Harrison Whitford, Monica Martin, David T. Walker, Drew Taubenfeld, Mike Viola, Antwaun Stanley, Rich Hinman and others. (Note: Contributors as listed on official Vulfmon music video descriptions on Vulf Records YouTube channel) Stratton's music has been featured on Radio Milwaukee and on David Byrne Radio playlists.

== Influences ==
Stratton has named Bernard Purdie, The Meters, The Jackson 5, and Mickey Katz as musical influences, among others. Doug Lussenhop is an inspiration for Stratton's video editing, along with Mel Brooks and Woody Allen.

== Discography ==
=== Studio albums ===
List of studio albums, with selected details
Title	Album details
Here We Go Jack	Released: August 5, 2022; Label: Vulf Records; Formats: LP, Digital download
Vulfnik	Released: June 1, 2023; Label: Vulf Records; Formats: LP, Digital download
Dot	Released: July 23, 2024; Label: Vulf Records; Formats: LP, Digital download
Deg	Released: October 20, 2025; Label: Vulf Records; Formats: LP, Digital download

=== Extended plays ===
Title	EP details
Interstitials I	Released: June 16, 2014; Label: Vulf Records; Formats: Digital download

=== Singles ===
Year	Title	Album/EP
2022	"Tell Me in a Song" (with Jacob Jeffries)	Here We Go Jack
2022	"Boogie Man" (featuring Mason Stoops and Tyler Nuffer)	Here We Go Jack
2022	"Alone Again, Naturally" (featuring Monica Martin)	Here We Go Jack
2022	"Contrapunctus I" (featuring Michael Winograd)	Here We Go Jack
2022	"Take Me to a Higher Place"	Here We Go Jack
2022	"Never Can Say Goodbye" (featuring David T. Walker and Solomon Dorsey)	Here We Go Jack
2022	"Let's Go! Let's Go!" (featuring Mike Viola)	Here We Go Jack
2022	"Bach Pedal" (featuring Rich Hinman)	Here We Go Jack
2022	"Here We Go Jack"	Here We Go Jack
2022	"Rutgers"	Here We Go Jack
2023	"I Can't Party"	Vulfnik
2023	"Ucla" (with Louie Zong)	Vulfnik
2023	"Bonnie Wait"	Vulfnik
2023	"Harpejji I"	Vulfnik
2023	"James Jamerson Used One Finger"	Vulfnik
2023	"Lord Will Make a Way" (with Antwaun Stanley, written by Thomas Dorsey)	Vulfnik
2023	"Harry's Theme (Lite Pullman)" (with Harrison Whitford)	Vulfnik
2023	"Nice to You" (with Jacob Jeffries)	Vulfnik
2023	"Blue" (with Jacob Jeffries)	Vulfnik
2023	"How Much Do You Love Me" (with Jacob Jeffries, remix by Ellis)	Vulfnik
2023	"Too Hot in L.A." (with Woody Goss and Jeremy Daly)	Dot
2023	"Surfer Girl" (with Drew Taubenfeld)	Dot
2024	"Letting Things Go" (with Evangeline)	Dot
2024	"Little Thunder" (with Jacob Jeffries and Harrison Whitford)	Dot
2024	"Tokyo Night" (with Jacob Jeffries and Evangeline)	Dot
2024	"It Feels Good to Write a Song" (with Antwaun Stanley and Jacob Jeffries)	Dot
2024	"Got To Be Mine" (with Evangeline)	Dot
2024	"Disco Snails" (with Zachary Barker)	Dot
2024	"Hit the Target" (featuring Eddie Barbash)	Dot
2024	"It Might Have To Be You" (with Evangeline)	Deg
2024	"Gloves Off" (with Tyler Ballgame)	Deg
2025	"Dawn" (with Jacob Jeffries and Harrison Whitford)	Deg
2025	"Big Boy 4014" (with Harrison Whitford)	Deg
2025	"Valk"	Deg
2025	"Chicago Summer" (with Evangeline and Woody Goss)	Deg
2025	"Rutgers II" (with Louis Cato)	Deg
2025	"Merengue alla Turca (Mozart Rondo)" (with Andy Arthur Smith)	Deg
2025	"Banc de poissons" (with Jacob Jeffries)	Deg
2025	"I Finally Feel Funky (ポケトだけ)" (with glitter party)	Deg
2026	"The Sheriff" (with Devon Yesberger, Noé Socha, and Jordan Rose)	Dott
2026	"Sleep For Days" (with Jackie Evans)	Dott
2026	"The Mantra" (with Devon Yesberger, Noé Socha, and Jordan Rose)	Dott
2026	"Rocco Darto Cato" (with Louis Cato and Rocco DeLuca)	Dott
2026	"Rowin'" (with Tommy de Bourbon, Beatrix, and Ryan Lerman)	Dott
2026	"Second Avenue - Klez Hall" (with Michael Winograd and Josh Harmon)	Dott
2026	"Bye Bye Nashville" (with Jacob Jeffries)	Dott
2026	"Tight Five" (with P.T. Sargent)	Dott
2026	"As Long As I Still Get You" (with Evangeline)	Dott
2026	"Leave You" (with Jackie Evans)	Dott
2026	"Mellotron" (with Jacob Jeffries, Harrison Whitford, and Mike Viola)	Dott
2026	"92°" (with Tommy de Bourbon)	Dott
2026	"Mama Say"	Dott
2026	"Feels Like Forever" (with Evangeline)	Dott
