= Pretail =

Pretail (also referred to as pre-tail, pre-retail, pre-launch, or pre-commerce) is a sub-category of e-commerce and online retail for introducing new products, services, and brands to market by pre-launching online, from creating an interest waitlist of signups before launch to collecting reservations or pre-orders in limited quantity before release, realization, or commercial availability. Pretail allows new product ideas/prototypes to be mass produced only when they have reached an initial threshold of buy-in from investors/consumers. Pretail includes pre-sale commerce, pre-order retailers, pre-launch marketing services, incubation marketplaces, crowdfunding communities, and demand chain management systems.

Pretail results in marketing efficiency, margin efficiency (cutting down on the middlemen like physical retailers or distributors), and product efficiency (getting direct feedback from potential customers fosters innovation and eliminates guesswork).

Retailers today are increasingly pretailing to test, promote, and monetize consumer demand in the initial phase of the new commerce pipeline as first introduced in a 2012 Forbes article. Some examples are: Tesla’s model 3 pre-order or VR gaming headset Oculus Rift funded through Kickstarter. Consumers engaging in pretail are known as an early adopter, fan, backer, supporter, or presumer (pre-launch consumer).

== Growth ==
Pretail demand is growing in consumer retail: electronics, movies, music, video games, books, fashion, software apps, connected devices, cars, toys, cosmetics, art, events, etc. This trend is being driven by companies to enhance new product development, better organize product releases, lower market risk, and increase early fan adoption. Large companies such as Amazon and Apple are pre-tailing new products to measure demand, manage supply chain market dynamics, and monetize fandom anticipation.

Entrepreneurs and small companies are embracing crowdfunding platforms such as Kickstarter and Indiegogo before product realization to fund manufacturing, test product-market fit, test market demand, pricing and take pre-orders to build a demand and fandom community. Consumer involvement with products and services pre-launch is becoming mainstream according to industry experts on consumer behavior trends.

=== Differencies with other forms of commerce ===
Pretail is related to a wide variety of business areas: from product innovation (concept & ideation) and supply chain management to marketing and sales. The aim of pretail is to build customer awareness and get sufficient financing to start product development. Pretail is future-oriented and is usually implemented using crowdfunding platforms, controlled media channels, mass media, and social networks.

== Pretail as a competitive advantage ==
=== Evolution of consumer preferences ===
The tendency of consumers to increasingly value the experience associated with a process of purchasing gives rise to experiential buying - creating a memorable buying experience. Pretail provides a sense of belongingness that customers perceive as important. Crowdfunding platforms make consumers feel that they are part of a community that consists of people who are interested in the particular product or service. Consumers thus consider the product as "the first", "the newest", "the one that I helped launch". Pretail is gaining popularity as it satisfies the demand for novel products which are of high consumers` interest nowadays.

=== Market evaluation tool ===
Pretail allows innovators to test their product-market fit with a Minimum Viable Product (MVP) equivalent. Thanks to pretailing risks associated with launching a product - financing and manufacturing are thus reduced. In addition to this, more people can invest in the project or participate to the project as salesmen. By testing the demand for the project entrepreneurs can lower perceived and actual risks associated with launching a product and starting a company. By using pretail model companies can match supply and demand trends before they actually start producing a product. It is the framework that serves for connecting increasingly demanding consumers and entrepreneurs. However, using pretail model for launching does not guarantee success of the product or enterprise, not all pretailers become e-tailers. Some services and products never take off, while others receive strong indications of market demand, receive large volumes of pre-orders, and raise the capital needed for starting manufacturing. Those kinds of services or products are the ones that succeed to become e-tailers.

=== Supply chain and finance ===
Product development costs are pushed down, more and more people can start their own business, create goods, and provide services to broader audiences. By being able to measure demand before mass production is started allows companies to forecast financing needed and develop inventory policy more accurately.

== Successful examples ==
=== Opal Nugget Ice Maker ===
Opal Nugget Ice Maker is a specialized ice maker which collected more than $2.7 million on the Indiegogo.

This ice maker freezes water in a special way. Rather than freezing the water directly, the ice maker scrapes flakes away from the cylinder, and through that process creates a lot of chewable ice nuggets. This type of ice making is often used in upscale cocktail bars or fast-food chains. However, machines used there are usually big and expensive. That is the reason why this project collected such a substantial amount of money.

=== Oculus Virtual Reality Headset ===
Oculus Headset is a virtual reality set that was initially started by Palmer Luckey as a side project. In 2014 the company was acquired by Facebook for $2 billion. One of the reasons for this acquisition was the apparent public interest in this type of technology which was shown two years earlier when the campaign on Kickstarter managed to raise a total of $2.4 million when the project was still in the prototype stage.

=== Glowforge Laser Marker, Engraver and Cutter ===
Glowforge laser marker, engraver and laser cutter has a successful and unique pretail story. Unlike many other projects, it attracted a substantial amount of capital without big platforms such as Kickstarter or Indiegogo. With a team of only 14 people, the company went from an unknown startup to a popular enterprise that raised $28 million during its self-run campaign.

Glowforge has been awarded three Make Editor’s Choice Awards at the World Maker Faire event in New York.

== See also ==
- Ecommerce
- Retail
- Pre-order
