= Joe Saylor =

American drummer

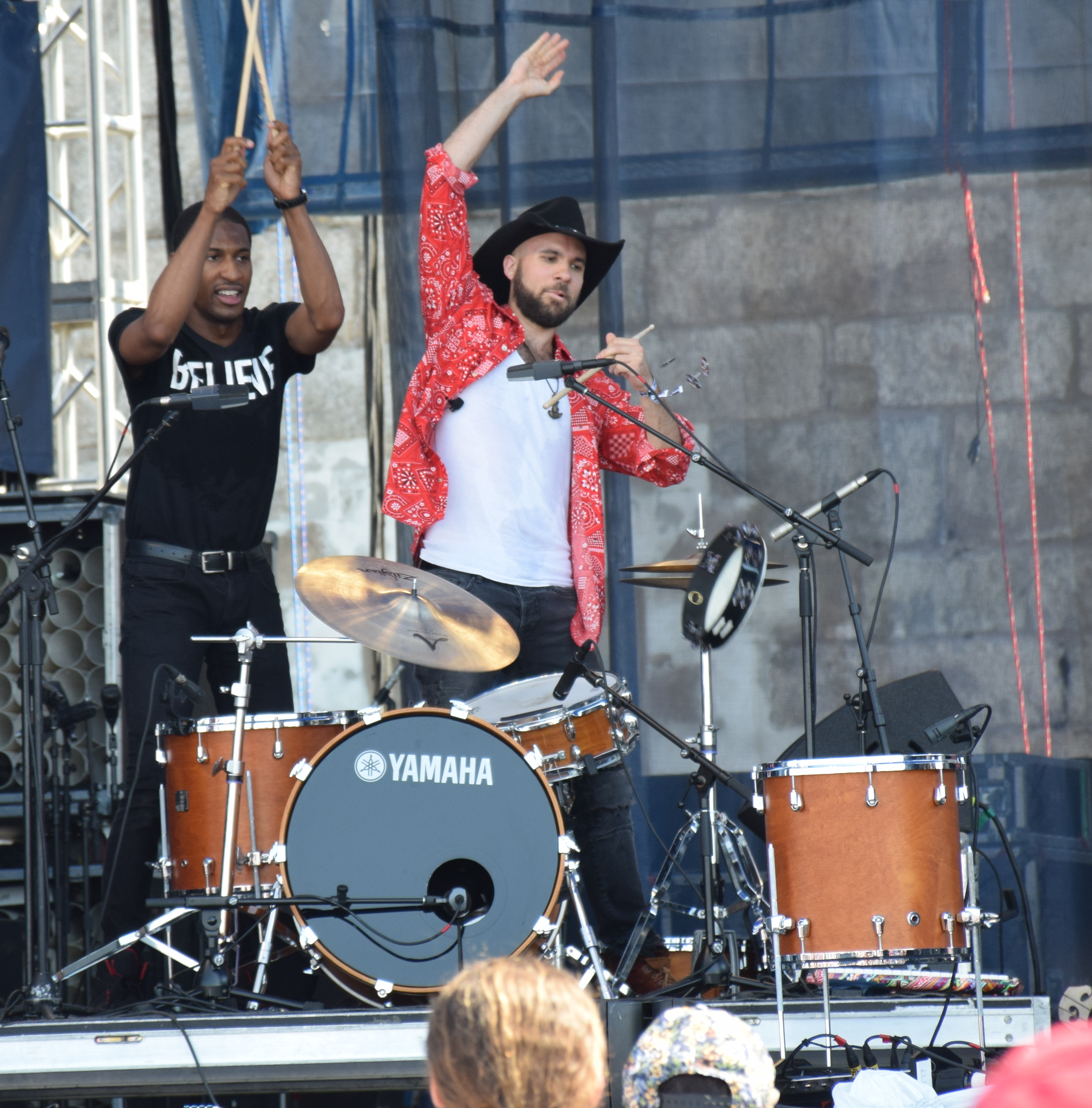
- Joe Saylor at the Newport Jazz Festival, 2015

Background information
- Born: Indiana, Pennsylvania
- Genres: Jazz; soul; R&B
- Occupation: Musician
- Instruments: Drums, percussion
- Member of: The Late Show Band
- Formerly of: Stay Human

Joe Saylor is a percussionist, educator, jazz musician and member of the house band for The Late Show with Stephen Colbert.

== Early life and education ==
Saylor was born in Indiana, Pennsylvania, to Paula and Nevin Saylor, who are music teachers in Pennsylvania public schools. His brother, Ben, teaches music at the Indiana Area School District's elementary schools.

Saylor graduated from Indiana Area Senior High School in 2004, and attended Indiana University of Pennsylvania, the Manhattan School of Music and the Juilliard School.

== Career ==
Saylor plays percussion in The Great Big Joy Machine, the former house band for The Late Show with Stephen Colbert. He also performs at various jazz clubs, festivals, and venues worldwide. He has conducted jazz workshops at various educational institutions, such as Stanford University. He has performed at venues including the Howard Theater, the White House, Lincoln Center, Rockwood Music Hall, Webster Hall, and the Great GoogaMooga.

He has performed or recorded with Jon Batiste, Roy Hargrove, Wynton Marsalis, Dwayne Dolphin, Steve Wilson, Joe Lovano, Jon Faddis, Slide Hampton, Ellis Marsalis, and Emmet Cohen on his "Live at Emmet's Place" series.

He appeared on the cover and feature article of the April 2016 issue of Modern Drummer, was featured in the March 2014 issue of Drum Magazine, and appeared on the HBO series Treme in 2010.

== Endorsements ==
Saylor endorses Tama Drums, Avedis Zildjian Company, Vic Firth, and Remo.

== Discography ==
=== With Jon Batiste ===
- Live In New York: At The Rubin Museum Of Art (self-released, 2006)
- Jazz is Now (Naht Jona, 2013) – drums, tambourine, group member
- Social Music (Razor & Tie, 2013) – drums, tambourine, associate producer, composer
- Christmas With Jon Batiste (self-released, 2016)
- Hollywood Africans (Verve, 2018)
- Anatomy of Angels: Live at the Village Vanguard (Verve, 2019) – drums
- Chronology of a Dream: Live at the Village Vanguard (Verve, 2019) – drums
- A Little Bit of Soul (Universal, 2020) – drums
- We Are: Roots & Traditions (Verve, 2020)
- Soul: Original Motion Picture Soundtrack (Walt Disney, 2020)
- Live at Electric Lady (Verve, 2021) – drums, tambourine
- We Are (Verve, 2021) – drums, tambourine
- We Are the Golden Ones (Universal, 2021) – drums
- The Summer Collection (Universal, 2022) – drums, tambourine
- The Evening Collection (Universal, 2022) – drums
- The Nominated Collection (Universal, 2022) – tambourine
- Saturday Night [Original Score] (Saturday Night/Sony Music, 2024) – drums
- The New Orleans Collection (Universal, 2025) – drums, tambourine

=== With others ===
- Craig Davis, Out of the Gate (Alanna, 2006) – main personnel, drums
- Matt Savage, Hot Ticket: Live In Boston (Savage, 2008)
- Kęstutis Vaiginis, Unexpected Choices (Semplice, 2008)
- Various artists, The Roads They've Taken (International Trumpet Guild, 2009)
- Various artists, Lithuanian Jazz Federation Presents: LT Jazz From Lithuania 2010 (NoBusiness/Lithuanian Jazz Federation, 2010)
- Cyrille Aimée, Live At Smalls (SmallsLIVE, 2011)
- Spike Wilner, La Tendresse (Posi-Tone, 2012) – drums
- Nick Vayenas, Some Other Time (Whirlwind, 2013)
- Various artists, Boardwalk Empire, Vol. 2 [Music from the Original HBO Series] (ABKCO/Universal, 2013) – drums
- Various artists, Boardwalk Empire, Vol. 3: Music from HBO Series [Original Soundtrack] (ABKCO, 2015) – percussion
- Lori Henriques, Legion of Peace: Songs Inspired by Laureates (Motéma Music, 2018) – drums, percussion
- Lauren Henderson, Alma Oscura (Brontosaurus, 2020)
- Remy Le Boeuf, Architecture of Storms (Soundspore, 2021) – tambourine
- Julius Rodriguez, Let Sound Tell All (Verve, 2022) – drums
- Jon Lampley, Night Service Live At LunAtico (self-released, 2024)
