= Indiana Area School District =

School district in Pennsylvania

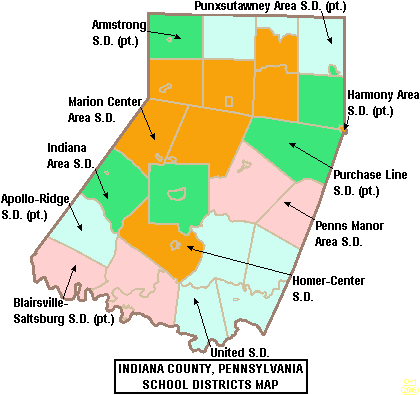

Address
- 501 East Pike Indiana, Indiana County, Pennsylvania, 15701; United States

District information
- Type: Public
- Grades: K-12
- Superintendent: Robert Heinrich

Students and staff
- Athletic conference: WPIAL
- Colors: Black and Red

Other information
- Website: www.iasd.cc

Indiana Area School District is a public school district in Indiana County, Pennsylvania. It is composed of White Township and Armstrong Township, along with Indiana and Shelocta boroughs.

== Elementary schools ==
The Indiana Area School District has three elementary schools. Two of these serve for grades K-3, and one serving for grades 4–5, and each serving a different part of the district. Ben Franklin Elementary School (K-3) serve Shelocta, Armstrong Township, west-central White Township, mostly the northwest corner of White Township, but also a small strip of western and southwestern White Township and the western third of Indiana Borough. East Pike Elementary School (K-3) serve the eastern third of White Township, the northeastern corner of Indiana Borough, southern Indiana Borough and south-central and most of southwestern White Township. While Dwight D. Eisenhower Elementary School (4-5) serves all of White Township, Indiana Borough, and Shelocta.

== Secondary schools ==
Indiana Area School District has two secondary schools. Indiana Area Junior High School (IJHS) contains grades 6-8, and Indiana Area Senior High School (IHS) contains grades 9-12.

== Extracurricular Programs ==
Both Indiana Area Junior High School and Indiana High School offer club programs for students. The high school's clubs include The Me To We Future Business Leaders of America, Relay For Life, and many theater clubs.

One Indiana High School alum earned 22 varsity letters in only 4 years of attending the Indiana Area Senior High School, participating in the sports golf, cross country, swimming, indoor track and field, tennis, and spring track and field.

== Notable alumni ==
- Authors Edward Abbey and Tawni O'Dell
- American Football League running back Jim Nance
- Joe Saylor, a professional jazz percussionist for the band Stay Human
- John Kopchick
- Christine Toretti United States Ambassador to Sweden
