= Eddie Barbash =

American saxophonist

- Born: West Islip, New York
- Genres: Jazz
- Occupation: Musician
- Instrument: saxophone
- Years active: 2008–present

Eddie Barbash is an American saxophonist known for his work as a core member of Jon Batiste and Stay Human, and was part of the house band for The Late Show with Stephen Colbert through 2016.

== Early life ==
Barbash was born in West Islip, New York, but spent his first years living in Oaxaca, Mexico. His family moved to Atlanta, Georgia when he was two years old. At eight years old he began playing saxophone in his elementary school band. Barbash studied at the University of North Carolina School of the Arts in high school. During college, he attended Juilliard and The New School. In 2008 he began playing with Chico Hamilton and Jon Batiste.

== Musical career ==
In 2009, he formed The Amigos, an Americana band based in New York City. He left The Amigos in 2013 to tour with Stay Human. He has performed with jazz greats Wynton Marsalis and Christian McBride, country stars Jim Lauderdale, Vince Gill and Ranger Doug, drummers Questlove and Chad Smith, composer David Amram, cabaret diva Nellie McKay, funk band Vulfpeck and many others. In 2015 Stay Human was announced as the house band for Late Show with Stephen Colbert.

== Discography ==
With Chico Hamilton

- Twelve Tones of Love (2009)

With The Amigos

- The Tres Amigos (2012)
- Diner In The Sky (2013)

With Jon Batiste

- In the Night (2008)
- MY NY (2011)
- Social Music (2013)
- The Late Show EP (2016)

With Sam Evian

- Premium (2016)

With Vulfpeck

- Eddie Buzzsaw (2017)
- Vulf Vault 005: Wong's Cafe (2022)

With Vulfmon

- "Hit The Target" (2024)

With Sam Reider

- Too Hot To Sleep (2018)

With Cory Wong

- Cory and the Wongnotes (2021)
- Wongs Cafe (2022)
- Power Station (2022)
