= White Township, Indiana County, Pennsylvania =

Township in Pennsylvania, US

White Township
- Township
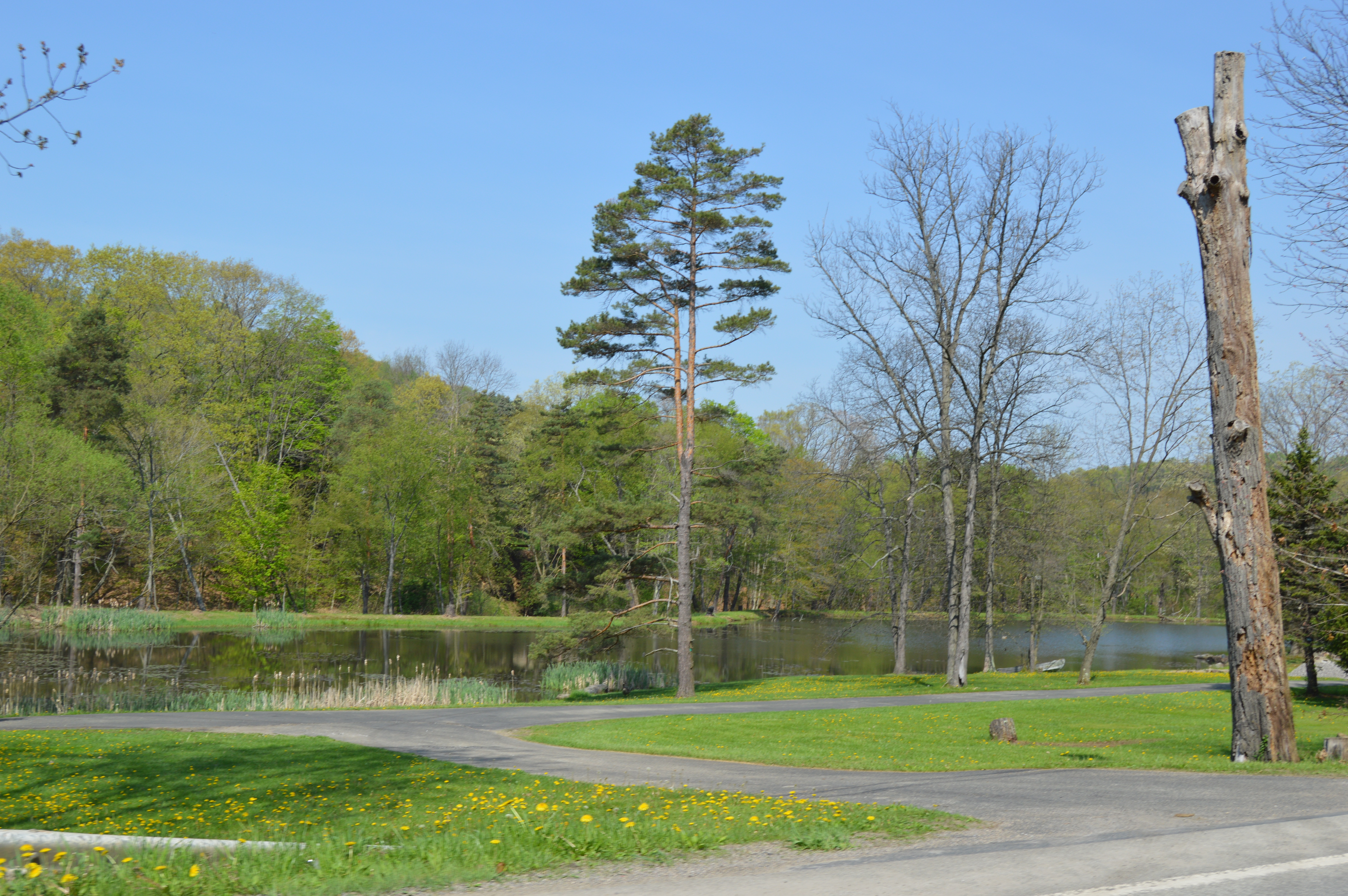
- Pond along Pennsylvania Route 110

- Flag Logo
- Etymology: Thomas White
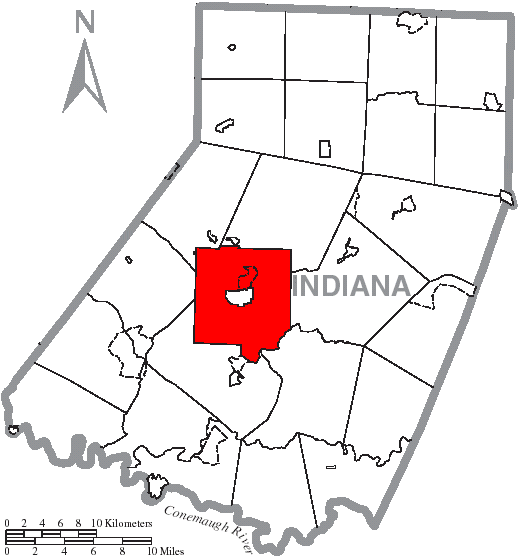
- Map of Indiana County, Pennsylvania highlighting White Township

- Pennsylvania
- Coordinates: 40°36′0″N 79°8′0″W
- Country: United States
- State: Pennsylvania
- County: Indiana
- Settled: 1772

Area
  - Total: 42.77 sq mi (110.78 km^{2})
  - Land: 42.35 sq mi (109.68 km^{2})
  - Water: 0.42 sq mi (1.09 km^{2})
- Elevation: 1,289 ft (393 m)

Population (2020)
  - Total: 15,242 ▼
  - Estimate (2021): 15,175
  - Density: 377.1/sq mi (145.58/km^{2})
- Time zone: UTC-5 (EST)
  - Summer (DST): UTC-4 (EDT)
- ZIP code: 15701
- Area code: 724
- FIPS code: 42-063-84472
- Website: https://www.whitetownship.org/

White Township is a township in Indiana County, Pennsylvania, United States. The population was 15,242 at the 2020 census.

== Geography ==
White Township entirely surrounds, but does not include, the Borough of Indiana. However, the township does include the community of Chevy Chase Heights, which is a census-designated place according to the US Census. The township also includes the communities of Ben Avon and Fulton Run.

According to the United States Census Bureau, the township has a total area of 42.9 square miles (111.0 km^{2}), of which 42.6 square miles (110.3 km^{2}) is land and 0.3 square miles (0.8 km^{2}) (0.70%) is water.

== History ==
The first non-Indian settlers within the current-day boundaries of the township were Fergus Moorhead and his family, who arrived in 1772 and built a grist mill in 1774. In 1781, Moorhead and family constructed a small fort where Philadelphia Street intersects Heritage Run Road today.

White Township, named for Judge Thomas White, was officially formed as a municipality in 1843, from portions of Center, Washington, Green, and Armstrong Townships. On March 15, 1844, the first White Township municipal election was held, in which James Hood and William Ewing were elected supervisors, in addition to other township offices.

== Demographics ==
Historical population
Census	Pop.	Note	%±
1850	1,288		—
1860	1,749		35.8%
1870	2,124		21.4%
1880	1,716		−19.2%
1890	1,635		−4.7%
1900	1,400		−14.4%
1910	1,985		41.8%
1920	2,328		17.3%
1930	2,948		26.6%
1940	4,387		48.8%
1950	5,340		21.7%
1960	6,884		28.9%
1970	8,769		27.4%
1980	13,177		50.3%
1990	13,788		4.6%
2000	14,034		1.8%
2010	15,821		12.7%
2020	15,242		−3.7%
2021 (est.)	15,175		−0.4%
U.S. Decennial Census

As of the census of 2000, there were 14,034 people, 6,025 households, and 3,741 families living in the township. The population density was 329.6 inhabitants per square mile (127.3/km^{2}). There were 6,553 housing units at an average density of 153.9 per square mile (59.4/km^{2}). The racial makeup of the township was 94.17% White, 2.48% African American, 0.11% Native American, 2.14% Asian, 0.25% from other races, and 0.84% from two or more races. Hispanic or Latino people of any race were 0.69% of the population.

There were 6,025 households, out of which 25.4% had children under the age of 18 living with them, 51.5% were married couples living together, 8.5% had a female householder with no husband present, and 37.9% were non-families. 32.6% of all households were made up of individuals, and 13.2% had someone living alone who was 65 years of age or older. The average household size was 2.23 and the average family size was 2.84.

The age distribution was 20.0% under the age of 18, 9.7% from 18 to 24, 24.1% from 25 to 44, 26.4% from 45 to 64, and 19.8% who were 65 years of age or older. The median age was 43 years. For every 100 females there were 88.4 males. For every 100 females age 18 and over, there were 83.9 males.

The median income for a household in the township was $34,469, and the median income for a family was $49,235. Males had a median income of $40,165 versus $22,143 for females. The per capita income for the township was $21,432. About 8.1% of families and 12.1% of the population were below the poverty line, including 13.0% of those under age 18 and 7.6% of those age 65 or over.

== Education ==
It is in the Indiana Area School District.

Parts of Indiana University of Pennsylvania are in the township.
