= Endea Owens =

American jazz musician

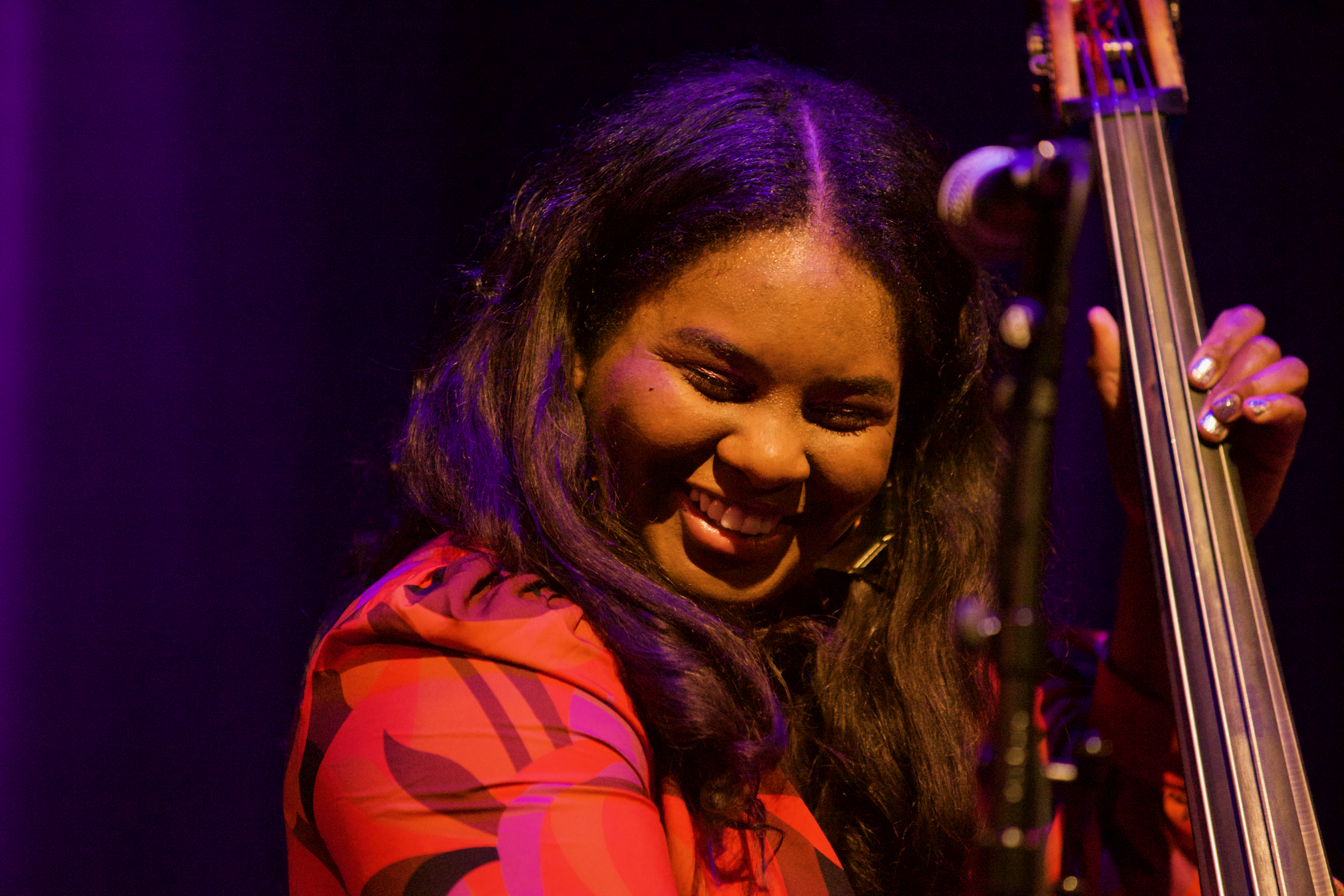
- Owens in 2023

Background information
- Born: 1988 or 1989 (age 37–38); Detroit, Michigan, U.S.
- Education: Michigan State University; Juilliard School
- Genre: Jazz
- Occupation: Musician
- Instrument: Double bass
- Member of: Endea Owens and The Cookout
- Formerly of: Stay Human
- Website: endeaowens.com

Endea Owens (born 1988 or 1989) is an American bassist and composer. She fronts the band Endea Owens and The Cookout, and was a member of Stay Human, the house band on The Late Show with Stephen Colbert.

== Early life and education ==
Owens was born and raised in Detroit, Michigan. Beginning at the age of eight, the first musical instrument she learned was the piano, followed by the violin. Owens was first exposed to jazz in the YouthVille Detroit music program, and learned the bass at the Detroit School of Arts. She was mentored by Marcus Belgrave.

Owens studied at Michigan State University and took bass lessons with Rodney Whitaker. In 2015, she graduated from the College of Music with a bachelor's degree in Jazz Studies.

Owens auditioned for the Juilliard School and the Manhattan School of Music, as she wanted to move to New York "to push myself harder and find my voice as an artist." She was accepted to and enrolled in the Manhattan School, but dropped out after three months as "it wasn't the right fit". She was encouraged by a professor at Juilliard to apply to that school again, did so, and was accepted. Owens graduated from Juilliard in 2018 with a master's degree in music.

== Career ==
Owens got her first gig at the age of 15. After graduating from Juilliard, she was selected by Wynton Marsalis as a Lincoln Center emerging artist.

In 2019, Owens met Jon Batiste. Later that year, she was hired as a substitute bassist for Batiste's band Stay Human, the house band on The Late Show with Stephen Colbert. She was asked to stay on, and remained with the band until the end of series, seven years later.

In 2020, Owens founded The Community Cookout, a nonprofit organization hosting a monthly series of free meals and concerts. Originally launched in Harlem, she has expanded the series worldwide.

Owens fronts the band Endea Owens and The Cookout, whose members are all Juilliard School alumni. In 2022, the band performed in a Tiny Desk Concert during a celebration of the 20th anniversary of Juilliard Jazz. Owens also performed in a Tiny Desk Concert with Jon Batiste in 2019.

In 2022, Owens composed "Ida's Crusade", a suite dedicated to the life of Ida B. Wells, for the Jazz at Lincoln Center Orchestra.

In 2023, Owens released her debut album, "Feel Good Music".

Recordings Owens has performed on include Jon Batiste's album We Are and the film Judas and the Black Messiah.

== Honors and recognition ==
Owens has received Emmy, Grammy, and Peabody Awards for her work.
