= Cory Wong =

American guitarist (born 1985)

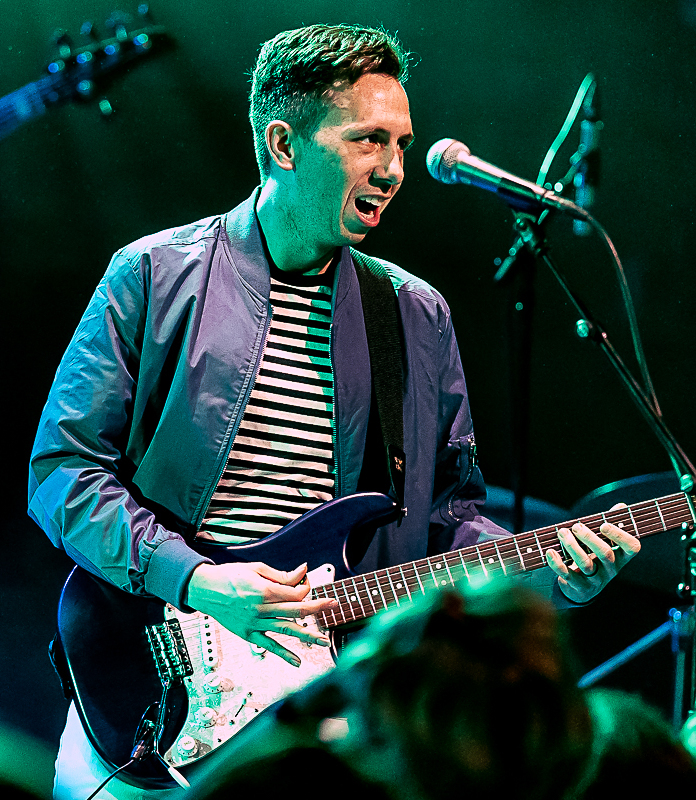
- Wong performing in 2022

Background information
- Born: c. 1985 (age 40–41); Poughkeepsie, New York, U.S.
- Origin: Minneapolis, Minnesota, U.S.
- Genres: Funk; R&B; pop; rock; jazz; soul; folk
- Occupations: Guitarist; composer; record producer; video producer
- Instruments: Guitar; bass guitar
- Works: Cory Wong discography
- Years active: 2008–present
- Labels: Vulf; Roundwound
- Member of: The Fearless Flyers
- Website: corywongmusic.com

Cory Wong (born c. 1985) (Note: Birth year per Star Tribune 2019) is an American guitarist, composer, record producer, and video producer based in Minneapolis. He has released many works as a solo artist and in partnership with others. His background spans several genres including jazz, rock, and funk. He is a recurring guitarist for the funk bands Vulfpeck and The Fearless Flyers, and has performed with Dave Koz, Stay Human, Ben Rector, Dr. Mambo's Combo, Chris Thile, Dave Matthews Band, and Dirty Loops. He released several albums in 2020, including Live in Amsterdam, a collaboration with the Metropole Orkest, and Meditations, a new-age album with Jon Batiste. His recent works include two albums released in conjunction with his variety show.

== Early life ==
Born in Poughkeepsie, New York, Wong was raised in Minneapolis, Minnesota, and is of mixed Chinese-American descent. Growing up, he was exposed to classic rock and jazz music by his father. He took piano lessons at age nine. He was fascinated by the Red Hot Chili Peppers and Primus and decided to play bass and start a band. He took guitar and bass lessons and started a punk rock band. His first instruments were a Fender Jazz Bass, a Gretsch guitar, and a Fender Stratocaster. He acquired a second Stratocaster during his senior year of high school, which remained his primary instrument until the release of his signature Fender Stratocaster in 2021.

== Career ==
Wong attended the University of Minnesota and the McNally Smith College of Music. At age 20 he decided to pursue music professionally. He credits his music school environment and his mentors for putting him on the right track. In particular he credits Peruvian guitarist Andrés Prado and Prince's drummer Michael Bland for showing him the nuances and cohesion of performing in an ensemble. He names guitarists Dave Williams and Paul Jackson Jr. as early influences.

In late 2000s and early 2010s, Wong focused on jazz music and performed in Minneapolis–Saint Paul jazz clubs. He released two records with jazz ensembles, Even Uneven in 2008 and Quartet/Quintet in 2012. He then performed in the Nashville music scene on a regular basis as a session musician and guitarist. He started touring with Ben Rector and worked with a variety of artists including Bryan White, Brandon Heath and Dave Barnes. In 2013, for a six-month period he performed in the Minneapolis-based band Dr. Mambo's Combo with several veterans of the city's R&B-pop-funk music scene including members of Prince's band: Michael Bland and bassist Sonny T. He calls this period his learning curve in performing "vibrant funk soul" music.

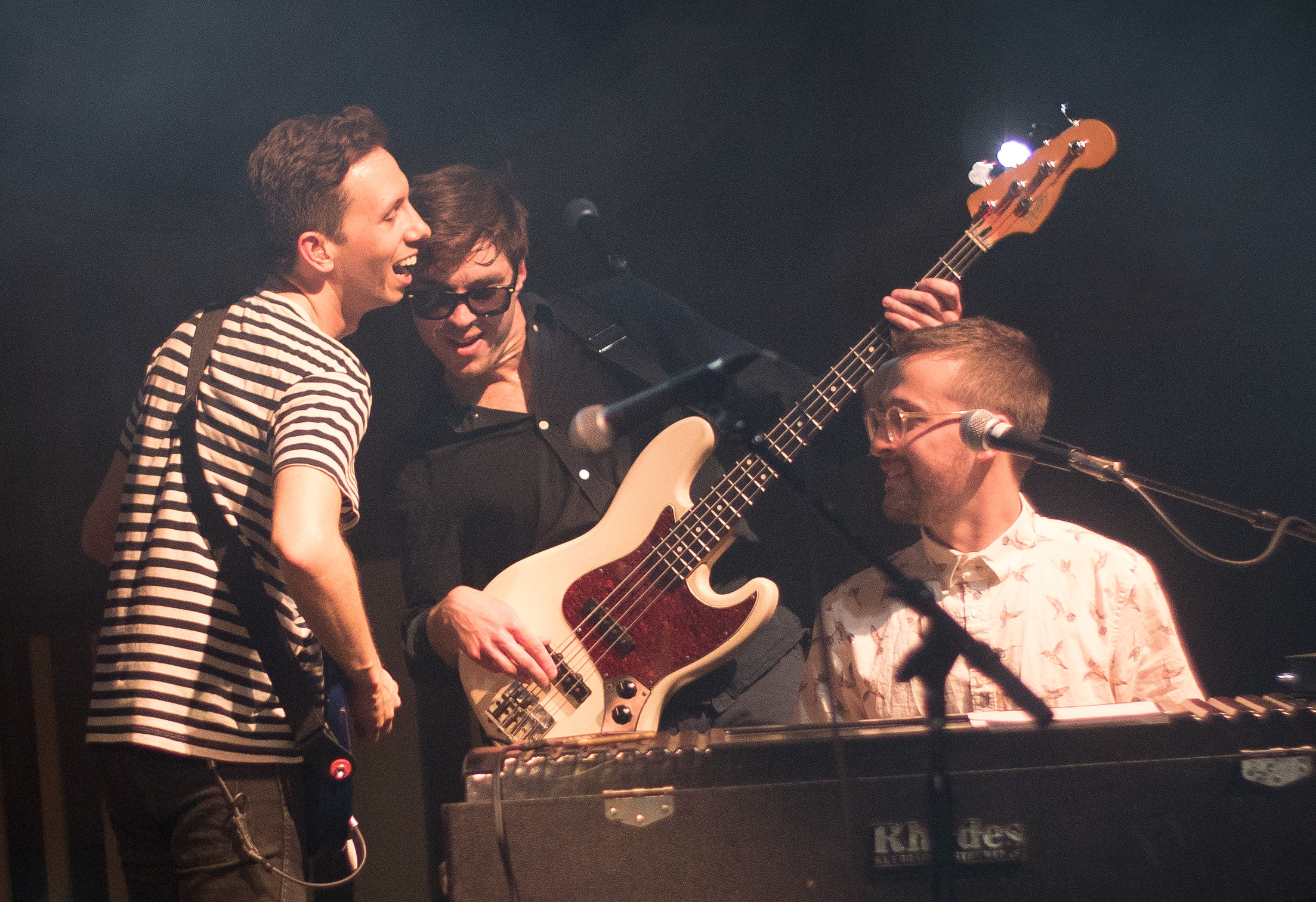
Cory Wong in 2017 with Vulfpeck

In 2013, Wong met members of the Ann Arbor-based band Vulfpeck. He performed a jam with the group which was later rerecorded and released as the track "Cory Wong" on The Beautiful Game album. In 2016, he started recording and touring with the band. He has recorded on every Vulfpeck album since then and toured with the band. He said of his guitar sound with Vulfpeck: "part of my sound is kind of bringing rhythm guitar to the front". He is also a member of The Fearless Flyers, an instrumental quartet (with Vulfpeck's bass player Joe Dart, Snarky Puppy's guitarist Mark Lettieri, and drummer Nate Smith) and has released four EPs and two albums with the group.

In 2016, Wong released a six-track EP as a lead artist. In 2017, he released his debut solo album, Cory Wong and The Green Screen Band. His second solo album The Optimist was released in 2018 and reached number 19 on the U.S. Jazz Albums chart. He released a third album Motivational Music for the Syncopated Soul in 2019. The albums feature contributions by Phoebe Katis, Antwaun Stanley, Michael Bland, Sonny T., Ben Rector, Jon Batiste, Louis Cato, Nate Smith and others. In 2020, Wong released his fourth solo album, Elevator Music for an Elevated Mood, which he called a continuation of his third album.

Wong has performed with Dave Koz, Metropole Orkest, Stay Human (the house band of The Late Show with Stephen Colbert), and with Chris Thile's band on the radio program Live from Here. He has toured in the United States and Europe in support of his solo albums, and with Vulfpeck. He released several albums in 2020, including a Grammy nominated new-age album titled Meditations with Jon Batiste.

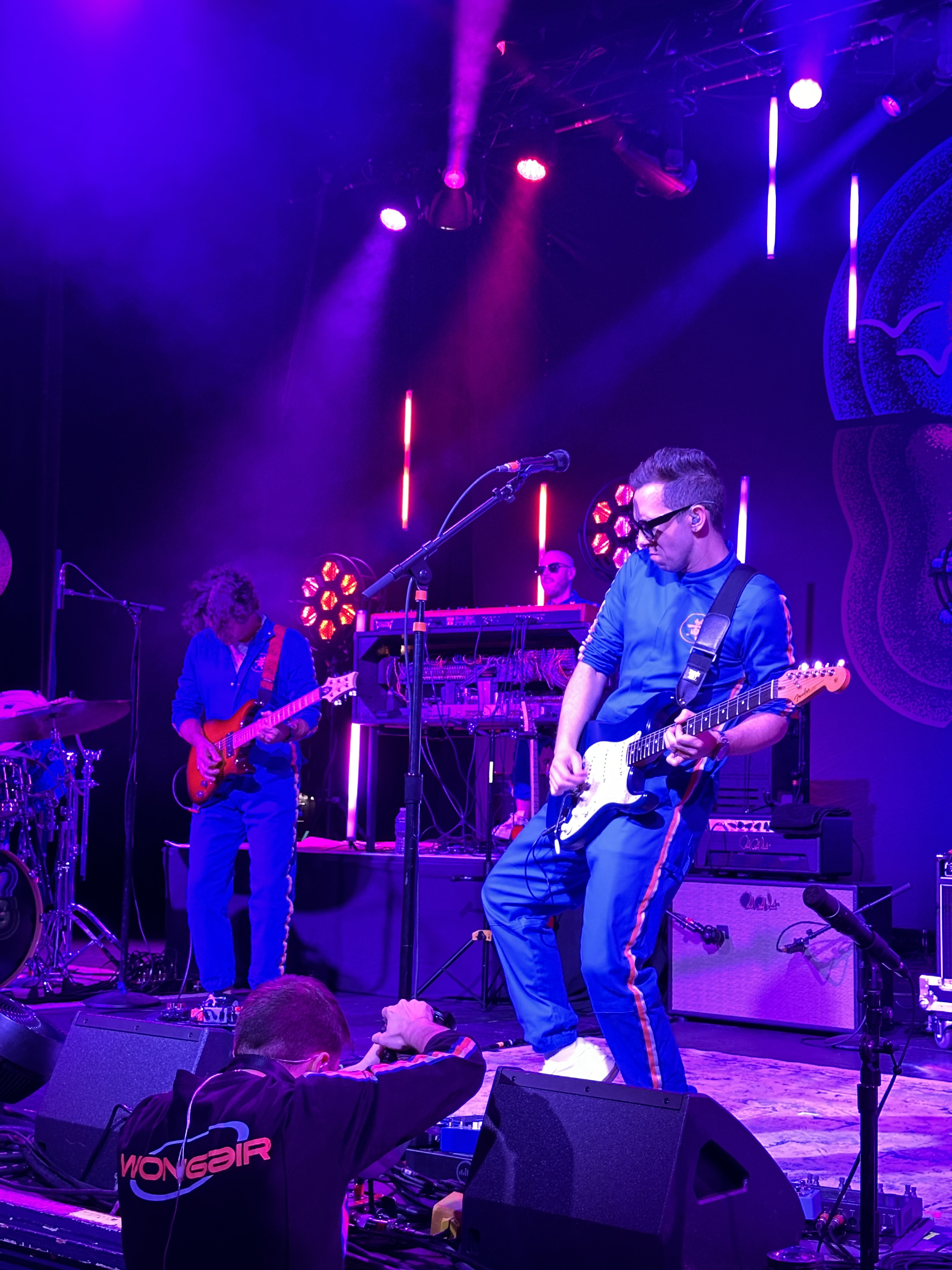
Cory Wong and Mark Lettieri at the Old National Centre in November 2024.

In 2020 to 2022, in the absence of touring over the course of coronavirus pandemic, Wong released multiple solo and collaborative albums including The Golden Hour with Dave Koz, Turbo with Dirty Loops, and Tailwinds with The Fearless Flyers. He started hosting (Note: Premiered in May 2020 and ongoing as of 2025) a music podcast for Premier Guitar magazine and he produced a YouTube music-comedy-variety show. His recent collaborations include recordings with Vaundy and Huntertones as featured artist.

=== Variety show ===
In 2021, Wong premiered a YouTube variety show titled "Cory and the Wongnotes". The show featured a full ensemble band, original music, short comedy skits, and interviews on subjects such as gear, genre and rhythm. The band consisted of Wong (guitar), Sonny T. (bass), Kevin Gastonguay (keys), Nêgah Santos (percussion), Petar Janjic (drums), Eddie Barbash (sax), Kenni Holmen (sax, flute), Sam Greenfield (sax, clarinet), Steve Strand (trumpet), (Note: Replaced with Jay Webb in season two) Jon Lampley (trumpet), Michael Nelson (trombone, horn arrangement). The show featured collaborators Cody Fry and Antwaun Stanley and culminated in the release of an 11-track album.

The second season of the show premiered in April 2022 and included performances and interviews with guests Larry Carlton, Mark Lettieri, Nate Smith, Victor Wooten, Sierra Hull, Béla Fleck, Chromeo, Big Wild, Billy Strings, Lindsay Ell and Joey Dosik. A 15-track album titled Power Station was released in conjunction with the show.

== Equipment ==
Wong's primary equipment includes the following:

Guitars

- Fender Highway One Stratocaster with Seymour Duncan Antiquity pickups
- Fender Cory Wong Signature Stratocaster with Signature Seymour Duncan Clean Machine pickups (Note: Fender signature model introduced in 2021)
- Ernie Ball Music Man Cory Wong Stingray II (Note: Music Man signature model introduced in 2025)

Amplifiers

- Fender '65 Super Reverb reissue
- Kemper Profiler
- Neural DSP Quad Cortex,

Strings

- D'Addario NYXL (.010–.046)

Effects

- Jackson Audio The Optimist Dual OD & EQ (Signature Pedal)
- Hotone Audio Wong Press (Signature Pedal)
- Wampler Ego Compressor
- Vertex Steel String Clean Drive
- Strymon Big Sky

He uses a variety of other instruments and accessories as well. He aims for a clean tone, and often records direct. In 2020, Wong collaborated with Neural DSP to create Archetype: Cory Wong, an audio plug-in with three amplifiers and several effects. In 2021, the Fender company released Wong's signature model Stratocaster guitar. He also developed two signature guitar pedals: The Optimist Dual Overdrive 6 EQ with Jackson Audio and the Wong Press Wah & Volume Pedal with Hotone Audio.

== Discography ==
Solo

- Becoming (2010)
- Quartet/Quintet (2012)
- Cory Wong and The Green Screen Band (2017)
- The Optimist (2018)
- Motivational Music for the Syncopated Soul (2019)
- Elevator Music for an Elevated Mood (2020)
- Trail Songs : Dusk (2020)
- Trail Songs (Dawn) (2020)
- The Striped Album (2020)
- Cory and The Wongnotes (2021)
- Wong's Cafe (2022)
- Power Station (2022)
- The Lucky One (2023)
- Starship Syncopation (2024)
- Lost in the Wonder (2026)

Cory Wong Quartet

- Even Uneven (2008)

The Fearless Flyers

- The Fearless Flyers (2018)
- The Fearless Flyers II (2019)
- Tailwinds (2020)
- Flyers Live at Madison Square Garden (2021)
- The Fearless Flyers III (2022)
- The Fearless Flyers IV (2024)
- The Fearless Flyers V (2025)
- Live in Italy (2025)

with Jon Batiste

- Meditations (2020)

with Dave Koz

- The Golden Hour (2021)

with Dirty Loops

- Turbo (2021)

== Awards and nominations ==
Cory Wong awards and nominations
Awards and nominations
Award	Wins	Nominations
Totals
Grammy Awards	0	1
Wins	0
Nominations	1

Year	Nominated work	Award	Category	Result
2021	Meditations with Jon Batiste	Grammy Award	Best New Age Album	Nominated
