= Louis Cato and the Great Big Joy Machine =

American jazz band

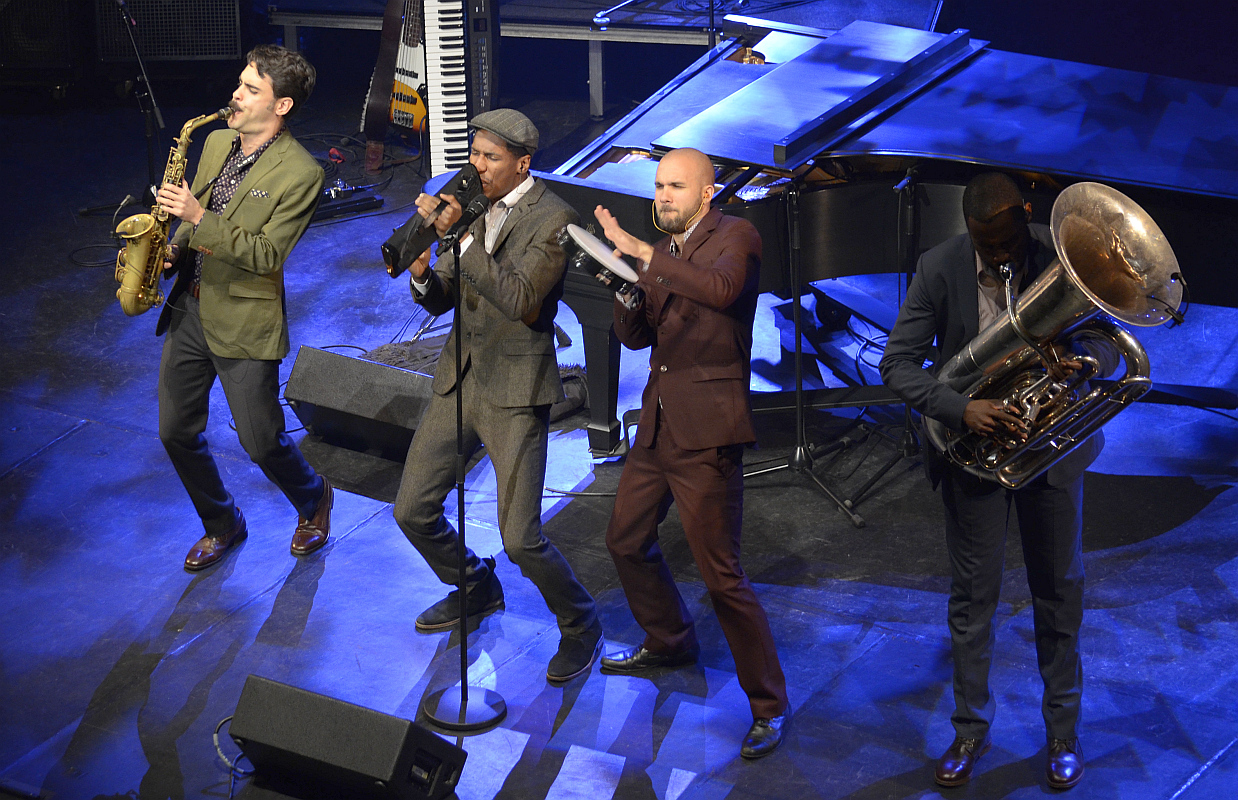
- The Great Big Joy Machine performing in 2014 as Stay Human

Background information
- Also known as: Stay Human (2004–2022); Louis Cato and the Late Show Band (2022–2026)
- Origin: New York City
- Genres: Jazz; soul; R&B
- Years active: 2004–present
- Members: Louis Cato; Joe Saylor; Nêgah Santos; Louis Fouché; Endea Owens; Jon Lampley; Corey Bernhard; Eli Janney
- Past members: Jon Batiste; Eddie Barbash; Grace Kelly; Phil Kuehn; Maddie Rice; Ibanda Ruhumbika

Louis Cato and the Great Big Joy Machine is a band originally founded and led by American musician Jon Batiste as Stay Human. They were the house band for Stephen Colbert's late-night talk show The Late Show with Stephen Colbert from September 8, 2015 until the series finale in May 21, 2026. When Batiste departed the show on August 12, 2022, Louis Cato became the new bandleader, and Stay Human was renamed Louis Cato and the Late Show Band, a change that took effect on September 6, 2022. In February 2026, the band adopted its current name.

== History ==
Former logo

From 1993 to 2015, the band formerly known as Paul Shaffer and the World's Most Dangerous Band served as the Late Show's house band under host David Letterman. During Letterman's tenure as host, the band used the name "CBS Orchestra".

Jon Batiste met fellow musicians Joe Saylor and Phil Kuehn in 2004 while attending The Juilliard School. Batiste began performing in New York City in 2005 with Saylor and Kuehn as a trio with Kuehn on bass and Saylor on drums. They were joined by two more musicians: Eddie Barbash on alto saxophone and Ibanda Ruhumbika on tuba. They then became known as Stay Human. In 2013, they released their first full-length album, Social Music, through Razor & Tie along with the single "Express Yourself," co-written and produced with Austin Bis.

On June 4, 2015, Stephen Colbert announced on his YouTube channel that Stay Human and its bandleader would be the house band for The Late Show with Stephen Colbert. Batiste and Stay Human's "stirring" 2014 performance of "Express Yourself" on Colbert's previous TV show, The Colbert Report, was the basis for Colbert's decision to name Batiste as bandleader on The Late Show. At this time Batiste also invited multi-instrumentalist Louis Cato to join the band.

In February 2016, the band released an album entitled The Late Show EP.

On April 22, 2017, Batiste and Stay Human played for the March for Science rally at the Washington Monument in Washington, D.C. In the mission statement for the March for Science it states, "The March for Science champions robustly funded and publicly communicated science as a pillar of human freedom and prosperity."

During the COVID-19 pandemic in 2020–2021, the band was introduced as "Jon Batiste and Stay Home-in", as they recorded their musical segments from home.

On August 12, 2022, Stephen Colbert announced that Jon Batiste was leaving The Late Show to focus on his solo career. The band was renamed Louis Cato and the Late Show Band, with Cato promoted to band leader.

On February 16, 2026, the band was renamed Louis Cato and the Great Big Joy Machine in preparation for the series finale and the release of a charity album.

== Current members ==
- Louis Cato (electric and acoustic guitar, banjo, bass, drums, percussion, trombone, tuba, vocals)
- Joe Saylor (drums, vocals)
- Nêgah Santos (percussion, vocals)
- Louis Fouché (saxophone, vocals)
- Endea Owens (bass, vocals)
- Jon Lampley (trumpet, tuba, vocals)
- Corey Bernhard (keyboards)
- Eli Janney (piano, keyboards)

=== Nêgah Santos ===
Nêgah Santos is a New York-based hand percussionist, songwriter, and Brazilian jazz musician.

Santos was born and raised in São Paulo, Brazil. Her early musical influences came from the popular music of Northeastern Brazil, with African rhythms and Portuguese melodies, maracatu, and forró. She attended Tom Jobim ULM in Itapecerica da Serra. After three years at Tom Jobim, Santos received a full scholarship at Berklee College of Music in Boston, where she graduated in 2015.

Santos was the first female percussionist for the Riverdance show, as part of the 21st anniversary Euro Tour in 2016. Beginning in December 2017, Santos played hand percussion, congas, surdo, repinique, tamborim, agogo bells, timbau, and various other percussion with the Late Show Band, the house band for The Late Show with Stephen Colbert. She has performed or recorded with Jon Batiste, Cory Wong, Esperanza Spalding, James Taylor, Bill Whelan, Terri Lyne Carrington, Dianne Reeves, Alejandro Sanz, Alcione, Joyce Moreno, and Marcos Valle. In 2023, Santos released a forró album, produced by Louis Cato. Santos is a two-time Emmy-winner, and a Peabody-awarded percussionist, as part of the Late Show Band.

Santos endorses and is endorsed by the cymbal company, Paiste.

Her discography includes:

- Zamb'Up – Zamb'Up (2017)
- Clemens Grassmann – Labyrinths & Tales (2017)
- Jaron Lamar Davis – My Views Through the Lens of Music (2018)
- Jon Batiste – Chronology of a Dream (2019)
- Terri Lyne Carrington & Social Science – Waiting Game (2019)
- Nêgah Santos – O Pandeiro (2021)
- Nêgah Santos – Forró Da Nêgah (2022)
- Terri Lyne Carrington – New Standards Vol 1 (2022)

== Former members ==
- Jon Batiste (piano, melodica, vocals) 2015–2022
- Eddie Barbash (alto saxophone) 2015–2016
- Grace Kelly (saxophonist) 2015–2016
- Phil Kuehn (bass) guest
- Maddie Rice (electric and acoustic guitar), 2015–2020, now with the Saturday Night Live Band.
- Ibanda Ruhumbika (tuba, trombone)
- Michael Thurber (bass) 2015—2016
