= The Hornheads =

American brass and woodwind collective

- Origin: Minneapolis-Saint Paul, Minnesota, United States
- Genres: Funk, Jazz, Rock, Pop
- Years active: 1991–present
- Members: Michael B. Nelson, Steve Strand, Dave Jensen, Kathy Jensen, Kenni Holmen
- Past members: Brian Gallagher (1991–1996)

The Hornheads are a collective of brass and woodwind session musicians based in Minneapolis–Saint Paul. They have played on albums and tours for a wide variety of musical artists, most notably Prince, who originally hired the musicians and led to the group's founding.

== History ==
=== Founding and touring band for Prince, 1991–1994 ===
The group was founded without a name in 1991 when Prince wanted a horn section to accompany the New Power Generation on his next album. Trombonist and arranger Michael B. Nelson was brought in as the band leader, along with Dave Jensen (trumpet/flugelhorn), Kathy Jensen (saxophone), Steve Strand (trumpet/flugelhorn), and Brian Gallagher (saxophone). During these early years, the group sometimes went as "The NPG Horns," but were ultimately credited as "The Hornheadz" on Prince's albums. From 1991 to 1994 the band, in addition to being the studio horn section, went on the road with Prince and appeared in most of his live shows.

=== Solo breakout and expanded studio work, 1994–1999 ===
The group's first solo album, Hornheads, was released in 1994. This was also when they officially codified their band name as "The Hornheads," dropping the "z" at the end that Prince had used on his albums. In accomplishing this goal, the band took a step back from touring and developed a reputation as a top-tier studio band, appearing on recordings for other Minneapolis-Saint Paul and Prince-adjacent artists, including Chaka Khan, Carmen Electra, The New Power Generation, Mavis Staples, Tevin Campbell, Mayte Garcia, Rosie Gaines, and Graham Central Station. In 1996, original saxophonist Brian Gallagher left the band and was replaced by Kenni Holmen. In 1997 they completed their second solo album, titled 5 Heads are Better Than 1. In 1999, a trio consisting of Nelson and the Jensens (Dave and Kathy) went on tour again with Prince for his Rave Un2 the Joy Fantastic album.

=== Branching out, 2000–2019 ===
Following the 1999–2000 season, The Hornheads officially retired as Prince's touring band. They continued to record with him in the studio for another year however, and ultimately appeared on almost all of his albums between 1994 and 2001. In 2004 the band completed their third solo album, Fat Lip. As they moved forward from their primary work with Prince, the band found plenty of work with other major recording artists, including albums by Michael Jackson, Stevie Wonder, Judith Hill, Andy Allo, Phil Upchurch, Jimmy Jam, Mandy Moore, The Jonas Brothers, Babyface, and many others. The Hornheads returned to the studio with Prince in 2011, and would again record with him and appear on his albums until his death in 2016. During this time period they also began to associate and record with the funk band Vulfpeck, including appearances by Kenni Holmen on their side project "The Fearless Flyers."

=== Cory and the Wongnotes, 2020–present ===
In 2020 the Hornheads were hired to fill out the horn section of funk guitarist Cory Wong's new project "Cory and the Wongnotes," joining members of The Late Show with Stephen Colbert's house band. Despite the COVID-19 pandemic, they recorded several episodes of an online variety show as well as a video of them performing a medley of songs by Stevie Wonder (arranged by Michael B. Nelson). In 2021 it was announced that they would be joining the Wongnotes on a North American tour, their first since they last toured with Prince in 1999. Additionally, social media posts from the band members and the posting of a casting call have confirmed that a second season of the Cory and the Wongnotes variety show is being produced during the summer of 2021 prior to the start of the band's tour.

== Style ==
As a solo act, The Hornheads are an a Capella horn section, meaning they perform without a piano or rhythm section accompaniment. They have primarily worked in the funk and jazz idioms, performing both original music and covering tunes by jazz masters such as Duke Ellington, Miles Davis, and Thelonious Monk. As session musicians, the Hornheads cover a wide variety of musical styles based on the artist they have been hired to record with. Many of their primary collaborative recording projects, such as those with Prince, NPG, and Cory Wong, have been heavily focused on the funk style.

== Members ==
The Hornheads have performed and toured either as a full band or as a trio consisting of different combinations of these members over the years:

- Michael B. Nelson, trombonist and arranger (1991–present)
- Steve Strand, lead trumpet and flugelhorn (1991–present)
- Dave Jensen, trumpet and flugelhorn (1991–present)
- Kathy Jensen, alto and baritone saxophone (1991–present)
- Brian Gallagher, tenor saxophone (1991–1996)
- Kenni Holmen, tenor saxophone (1996–present)

== Tours ==
- Various tours as the house band for Prince, 1991–1994
- Second tour with Prince, 1999–2000
- Cory and the Wongnotes North American Tour, 2021
