= Ta Mara & the Seen (album) =

Ta Mara and the Seen

Studio album by Ta Mara and the Seen
- Released: September 25, 1985
- Recorded: 1985; Jungle Love Studios; Minneapolis, Minnesota
- Genre: R&B; funk; Minneapolis sound
- Length: 42:29
- Label: A&M
- Producer: Jesse Johnson

Ta Mara and the Seen chronology
Ta Mara and the Seen (1985)	Blueberry Gossip (1988)

Professional ratings
Review scores
Source	Rating
AllMusic	4/5 stars

Ta Mara and the Seen is the 1985 debut album by Minneapolis, Minnesota group Ta Mara and the Seen, produced by the Time's guitarist Jesse Johnson. The album peaked at number 20 on the US R&B albums chart, while its lead single, "Everybody Dance", reached number three on the R&B singles chart.

== Track listing ==
1. "Everybody Dance" - 5:41 (Jesse Johnson, Ta Mara)
2. "Affection" - 4:29 (Johnson, Jerry Hubbard Jr.)
3. "Summertime Love" - 4:58 (Johnson, Ta Mara)
4. "Lonely Heart" - 3:20 (Johnson, Tim Bradley)
5. "Thinking About You" - 5:22 (Johnson, Ta Mara)
6. "Got to Have You" - 6:09 (Johnson, Ta Mara)
7. "Long Cold Nights" - 5:09 (Jamie Chez, Mark Cardenas, Michael Baker, Rocky Harris)
8. "Lonely Heart (Reprise)" - 1:00 (Johnson, Bradley)

== Charts ==
Chart (1985)	Peak position
US Billboard Pop Albums	54
US Billboard Top R&B Albums	20

=== Singles ===
Year	Single	Chart positions	
Year	Single	US Pop	US R&B
1985	"Everybody Dance"	24	3
