= Louis Cato =

American musician and bandleader (born 1985)

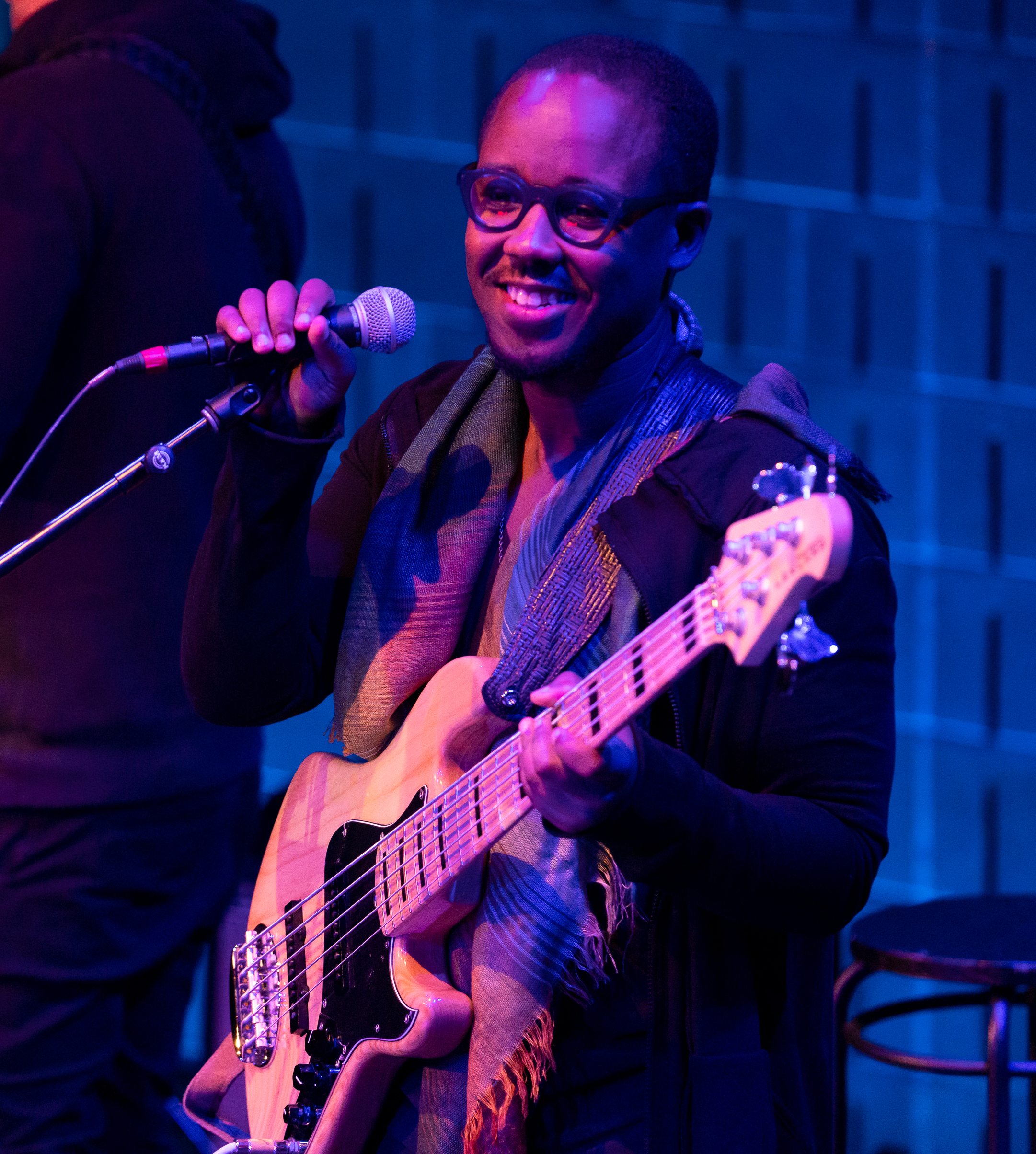
- Cato in 2021

Background information
- Born: May 3, 1985 (age 41); Lisbon, Portugal
- Genres: Jazz; R&B
- Occupations: Musician; songwriter; record producer
- Instruments: Vocals; guitar; bass; drums; percussion; brass
- Member of: Louis Cato and the Great Big Joy Machine
- Formerly of: Stay Human
- Website: louiscato.com

Louis Cato (born May 3, 1985) is an American multi-instrumentalist, singer, songwriter, record producer, and the bandleader of Louis Cato and the Great Big Joy Machine, which was the house band for The Late Show with Stephen Colbert. He is also a solo recording artist with three albums to his credit.

== Early life ==
Cato was born on May 3, 1985, in Lisbon, Portugal, to African American parents. At the time, his father was stationed in Portugal by the US military, but the family left the country a few months after Cato's birth, and he grew up in Albemarle, North Carolina. His mother was a church organist, and Cato began playing drums at age two. He attended Berklee College of Music in Boston, Massachusetts, for two semesters, before leaving in 2004.

== Career ==
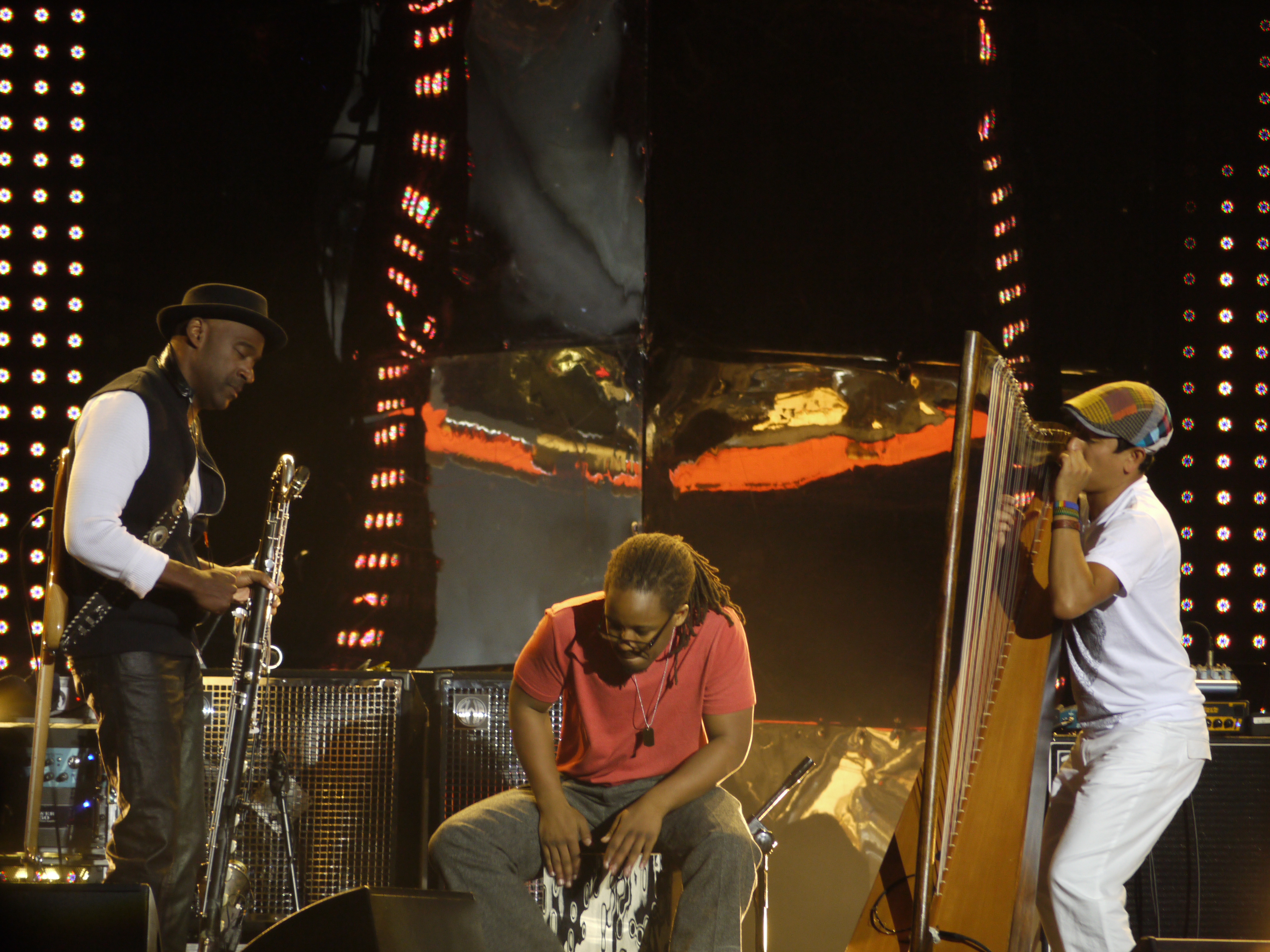
Cato playing the cajón with Marcus Miller and Edmar Castaneda in 2011

Cato met Marcus Miller at a jam session at the North Sea Jazz Festival. They subsequently toured together for several years.

Cato joined the band Stay Human at the inception of Stephen Colbert's Late Show in 2015 and served as interim bandleader whenever the original leader, Jon Batiste, was unavailable. Batiste took a break from the Colbert show in the summer of 2022 and announced on August 12 that he would not be returning. Cato was appointed the new leader of the house band, renamed the Late Show Band, and formally took over on September 6. Colbert has described Cato as a musical genius, saying, "He can play basically every instrument over there. Give him an afternoon, he'll learn how to play Mozart on a shoehorn."

Cato released his first solo record, titled Starting Now, in 2016, through RSVP Records. He wrote all the songs in collaboration with his writing partner Adam Tressler.

In 2019, he toured Ireland as a drummer with Paul Brady.

Cato lived and worked with Michael League and Justin Stanton of Snarky Puppy, Gisela João, and Becca Stevens, while working on the album Mirrors, in 2020. The record shares the name with the jazz supergroup the musicians formed.

In August 2022, Cato announced he was in post-production on his new album, Reflections. It was released on August 11, 2023.

In 2026, Cato accompanied the funk band Vulfpeck on their European and U.S. tour and performed on their upcoming album, Decay of the Aura.

== Personal life ==
Cato was involved in a tour bus crash while in Switzerland with Marcus Miller in November 2012. He stated he broke his back in two places and sprained his neck.

Cato has two children.

== Discography ==
Solo

- Starting Now (2016)
- Reflections (2023)
- Cato Covers, Vol.1 (2024)

with Vulfmon

- "Rutgers II" (2025)
- "Rocco Darto Cato" (2026)
