= Dr. Mambo's Combo =

American musical group

Dr. Mambo's Combo has been performing weekly at Bunkers Music Bar & Grill in Minneapolis, Minnesota, since 1987 — one of the longest running weekly residencies anywhere in America. Original members include Tim Emerson (Dr. Mambo), Margaret Cox, Billy Franze, Bruce Jackson, Michael Bland, Doug Nelson, Stevie Cherewan, Mark Licktieg, and several others.

The current lineup includes Julius Collins and Monique Blakey on vocals, Sonny Thompson on bass, Brian Ziemniak on keys, Pete Suttman on drums and Geoff LeCrone on guitar. Numerous celebrities and big names in the local music scene have sat in with the band, including:

- Prince
- Andre Cymone
- John Mayer
- Sheila E
- Bonnie Raitt
- Jellybean Johnson
- Fred Steele
- Slash
- Jonny Lang
- Dez Dickerson
- Eric Gales
- Larry Graham
- Joey DeFrancesco
- Donny Osmond
- Roy Hargrove
- Michael Bolton
- Cory Wong
- Questlove
- Taj Mahal
- Cory Henry
- Justin Tyson
- Robert Searight
- Gregg Bissonette
- Gene Lake
