= Music of Dance Dance Revolution X =

The music of Dance Dance Revolution X is a collection of tracks that are playable on Dance Dance Revolution X, a music video game first released in Japan by Konami on December 24, 2008, then later in Europe on June 3, 2009 and North America on June 9, 2009. The soundtracks for the different releases are primarily dance, hip hop, and synthpop based with additional tracks covering multiple other genres.

This mix features the return of several licensed songs from the Dancemania music compilation series, re-edited into new song cuts dubbed "2008 X-edits". It also marks the first arcade DDR appearance of synthpop licenses from A Different Drum Records, which originally made their debut on Dance Dance Revolution Ultramix 2 on Xbox.

== Lists of songs ==
These are the lists of songs across the different releases of Dance Dance Revolution X. They are in release order, then sorted as the songs are organized and displayed in game (otherwise grouped by category and alphabetized). The songs with a padlock are not available in-game until certain conditions are met. A clapperboard indicates that the song has its original, or a custom-made music video that can be seen during play.

=== Arcade ===
This is the soundtrack of the arcade release of Dance Dance Revolution X. There are a total of 391 songs (387 in the North American and European releases), 88 for this version.

| Song | Artist | Note |
Licensed songs (25 total)
| "30 Lives (Up-Up-Down-Dance Mix)" | The Motion Sick | from the album The truth will catch you, just wait... |
| "Always On My Mind" | Pet Shop Boys | from the album Introspective |
| "Big Girls Don't Cry" | Purefocus | cover of Fergie |
| "Boys (2008 X-edit)" | SMiLE.dk | from Dancemania X1 original cut from Dance Dance Revolution 2ndMix |
| "Butterfly (2008 X-edit)" | SMiLE.dk | from Dancemania 10 original cut from Dance Dance Revolution |
| "DUB-I-DUB (2008 X-edit)" | ME & MY | from Dancemania EXTRA original cut from Dance Dance Revolution 2ndMix |
| "Feel" | Neuropa | A Different Drum license from the album The Blitz |
| "GET UP'N MOVE (2008 X-edit)" | S&K | from Dancemania BASS#2 original cut from Dance Dance Revolution 2ndMix |
| "Ghetto Blasta Deluxe" | Audio Magnetics | |
| "Happy" | Fischerspooner | from the album Odyssey |
| "Here It Goes Again" | OK Go | from the album Oh No |
| "Koko Soko" | SMiLE.dk | from the album Party Around the World |
| "Make Me Cry" | Junk Circuit | A Different Drum license from the album Chasm [Extended Mixes] |
| "ポリリズム" (Polyrhythm) | Pink Lemonade | cover of Perfume |
| "Put 'Em Up" | Edun | |
| "Reach Up" | Alien Six | A Different Drum license |
| "世界は踊る" (Sekai wa Odoru) | BREAKERZ | |
| "スキ☆メロ" (Suki☆Melo) | 小倉優子 | |
| "Swingin'" | Bill Hamel & Naughty G. | cover of Blu Cantrell |
| "旅人" (Tabibito) | 高杉さと美 | |
| "Till the lonely's gone" | Z-licious | |
| "Trickster" | 水樹奈々 | from the album Ultimate Diamond |
| "U Can't Touch This" | MC Hammer | from the album Please Hammer, Don't Hurt 'Em |
| "We Come Alive" | Alien Six | A Different Drum license |
| "We've Got To Make It Tonight" | Babamars | from the album Surprising Twists |
New Konami Originals (20 total)
| "A Geisha's Dream" | NAOKI feat. SMiLE.dk | New Konami Original |
| "Dance Celebration" | Bill Hamel feat. kevens | New Konami Original |
| "Dance Celebration (System7 Remix)" | Bill Hamel feat. kevens | New Konami Original |
| "Dance Floor" | neuras feat. Yurai | New Konami Original |
| "Dream Machine" | Darwin | New Konami Original |
| "Flight of the Phoenix" | Jena Rose | New Konami Original |
| "Flourish" | sonic-coll. feat. frances maya | New Konami Original |
| "HOW TO PLAY" | MC X | New Konami Original; STARTER MODE only |
| "Inspiration" | DKC Crew | New Konami Original |
| "Lift You Up" | wolli | New Konami Original |
| "Party Lights" | Tommie Sunshine | New Konami Original |
| "Playa (Original Mix)" | Hamel and St.Croix feat. Jules Mari | New Konami Original |
| "Slip Out" | Harmony machine | New Konami Original |
| "Slip Out (bounce in beat mix)" | Harmony machine | New Konami Original |
| "Taj He Spitz" | DKC Crew | New Konami Original |
| "Taj He Spitz (Tommie Sunshine's Brooklyn Fire Re-Touch)" | DKC Crew | New Konami Original |
| "Take A Chance" | neuras feat. GATZ | New Konami Original |
| "Ticket To Bombay" | Jena Rose | New Konami Original |
| "Tracers (4Beat Remix)" | Ruffage & Size | New Konami Original |
| "Waiting 4 u" | DDT | New Konami Original |
From Console Version (11 total)
| "Beautiful Inside (Cube::Hard Mix)" | NM feat. Alison Wade | from Dance Dance Revolution Hottest Party |
| "dazzle" | kobo feat. kr:agué | from Dance Dance Revolution SuperNova 2 (NA PS2) |
| "INTO YOUR HEART (Ruffage remix)" | NAOKI feat. YASMINE | from Dance Dance Revolution Hottest Party 2 |
| "LOVING YOU (Epidemik remix)" | TONI LEO | from Dance Dance Revolution Hottest Party 2 |
| "Malacca" | nc ft. NRG factory | from Dance Dance Revolution SuperNova 2 (NA PS2) |
| "puzzle" | 日本少年 | from Dance Dance Revolution SuperNova 2 (JP PS2) |
| "S・A・G・A" | Veeton | from Dance Dance Revolution SuperNova 2 (JP PS2) |
| "SUPER SAMURAI" | jun | from Dance Dance Revolution Hottest Party |
| "The flower in your smile" | TACOS NAOMI feat. 小久保裕之 | from Dance Dance Revolution SuperNova 2 (JP PS2) |
| "TimeHollow" | Masanori Akita | from Dance Dance Revolution SuperNova 2 (JP PS2); Theme song of Time Hollow |
| "will" | NAOKI | from Dance Dance Revolution Hottest Party |
New BEMANI Crossovers (5 total)
| "Blue Rain" | dj TAKA VS Ryu☆ | from beatmania IIDX 15 DJ TROOPERS |
| "Chance and Dice" | 日本少年 | from jubeat |
| "凛として咲く花の如く" (Rin to Shite Saku Hana no Gotoku) | 紅色リトマス | from pop'n music 15 ADVENTURE |
| "Übertreffen" | TAKA respect for J.S.B. | from pop'n music 14 FEVER! |
| "零 -ZERO-" (ZERO) | TËЯRA | from beatmania IIDX 14 GOLD |
Xmixes (5 total)
| "Xmix1 (Midnight Dawn)" | dj jiggens | Xmix |
| "Xmix2 (Beats 'n Bangs)" | DJ Inhabit | Xmix |
| "Xmix3 (Stomp Dem Groove)" | dj nagi | Xmix |
| "Xmix4 (Linear Momentum)" | dj jiggens | Xmix |
| "Xmix5 (Overcrush)" | DJ Inhabit | Xmix |
Boss songs (6 total)
| "On The Break" | Darwin | New Konami Original; Accessible as FINAL STAGE |
| "SABER WING" | TAG | New Konami Original; Accessible as EXTRA STAGE#1 |
| "SABER WING (AKIRA ISHIHARA Headshot mix)" | TAG | New Konami Original; Accessible as EXTRA STAGE#2 |
| "Horatio" | OR-IF-IS | New Konami Original; Accessible as ENCORE EXTRA STAGE#1 |
| "on the bounce" | neuras | New Konami Original; Accessible as ENCORE EXTRA STAGE#2 |
| "Trigger" | sonic-coll. | New Konami Original; Accessible as ENCORE EXTRA STAGE#3 |
X-Specials (16 total)
| "PARANOiA(X-Special)" | 180 | Dance Dance Revolution X-Special; Accessible as EXTRA STAGE |
| "TRIP MACHINE(X-Special)" | DE-SIRE | Dance Dance Revolution X-Special; Accessible as ENCORE EXTRA STAGE |
| "SP-TRIP MACHINE ~JUNGLE MIX~(X-Special)" | DE-SIRE | Dance Dance Revolution 2ndMix X-Special; Accessible as EXTRA STAGE |
| "PARANOiA MAX ~DIRTY MIX~(X-Special)" | 190 | Dance Dance Revolution 2ndMix X-Special; Accessible as ENCORE EXTRA STAGE |
| "PARANOiA Rebirth(X-Special)" | 190' | Dance Dance Revolution 3rdMix X-Special; Accessible as EXTRA STAGE |
| "AFRONOVA(X-Special)" | RE-VENGE | Dance Dance Revolution 3rdMix X-Special; Accessible as ENCORE EXTRA STAGE |
| "TRIP MACHINE CLIMAX(X-Special)" | DE-SIRE | Dance Dance Revolution 4thMix X-Special; Accessible as EXTRA STAGE |
| "PARANOIA EVOLUTION(X-Special)" | 200 | Dance Dance Revolution 4thMix X-Special; Accessible as ENCORE EXTRA STAGE |
| "PARANOiA ETERNAL(X-Special)" | STM 200 | Dance Dance Revolution 5thMix X-Special; Accessible as EXTRA STAGE |
| "Healing Vision(X-Special)" | DE-SIRE | Dance Dance Revolution 5thMix X-Special; Accessible as ENCORE EXTRA STAGE |
| "MAX 300(X-Special)" | Ω | DDRMAX Dance Dance Revolution 6thMix X-Special; Accessible as EXTRA STAGE |
| "CANDY☆(X-Special)" | Luv UNLIMITED | DDRMAX Dance Dance Revolution 6thMix X-Special; Accessible as ENCORE EXTRA STAGE |
| "MAXX UNLIMITED(X-Special)" | Z | DDRMAX2 Dance Dance Revolution 7thMix X-Special; Accessible as EXTRA STAGE |
| "革命(X-Special)" (Kakumei(X-Special)) | dj TAKA with NAOKI | DDRMAX2 Dance Dance Revolution 7thMix X-Special; Accessible as ENCORE EXTRA STAGE |
| "The Legend of MAX(X-Special)" | ZZ | Dance Dance Revolution Extreme X-Special; Accessible as EXTRA STAGE |
| "Dance Dance Revolution(X-Special)" | DDR ALL STARS | Dance Dance Revolution Extreme X-Special; Accessible as ENCORE EXTRA STAGE |
Removed songs (45 total)
| "Baby's Tears (スカイガールズ・オープニングテーマ)" (Baby's Tears (SKY GIRLS opening theme)) | 小坂りゆ | from Dance Dance Revolution SuperNova 2 |
| "Baby's Tears" | MIKI ROBERTS | from Dance Dance Revolution SuperNova |
| "BAILA! BAILA!" | DANDY MINEIRO | from Dance Dance Revolution SuperNova |
| "BALALAIKA, CARRIED WITH THE WIND" | Julie ann Frost | from Dance Dance Revolution SuperNova |
| "Brilliant R-E-D" | NAOKI feat. Tahirih Walker | from Dance Dance Revolution SuperNova |
| "Drivin'" | NAOKI feat. Paula Terry | from Dance Dance Revolution SuperNova |
| "HONEY♂PUNCH" | 小坂りゆ | from Dance Dance Revolution SuperNova |
| "Hunting for you" | Togo Project feat. Megu & Scotty D. | from Dance Dance Revolution SuperNova |
| "I'M FOR REAL" | SLAKE feat. JP Miles | from Dance Dance Revolution SuperNova |
| "INSERTiON (Machine Gun Kelly Mix)" | Thuggie D. | from Dance Dance Revolution SuperNova |
| "Keep On Liftin'" | dj nagureo | from Dance Dance Revolution SuperNova |
| "KI SE KI (DDR edit)" | BeForU | from Dance Dance Revolution SuperNova |
| "Knock Out Regrets" | MAKI@TOGO . BAND | from Dance Dance Revolution SuperNova |
| "祭 (J-SUMMER MIX)" (Matsuri (J-SUMMER MIX)) | RE-VENGE | from Dance Dance Revolution SuperNova |
| "MONDO STREET" | Orange Lounge | from Dance Dance Revolution SuperNova |
| "Morning Glory" | BeForU | from Dance Dance Revolution SuperNova |
| "PEACE (^^)v" | BeForU | from Dance Dance Revolution SuperNova |
| "peace-out" | dj nagureo | from Dance Dance Revolution SuperNova |
| "You're Not Here" | Heather | from Dance Dance Revolution SuperNova |
| "Your Rain (RAGE MIX)" | Akira Yamaoka feat. Mary Elizabeth McGlynn | from Dance Dance Revolution SuperNova |
| "CRASH!" | mr.BRIAN & THE FINAL BAND | from Dance Dance Revolution Extreme |
| "Do It Right (Harmonized 2Step Mix)" | SOTA feat. Ebony Fay | from Dance Dance Revolution Extreme |
| "feeling of love" | youhei shimizu | from Dance Dance Revolution Extreme |
| "HOLD ON ME" | tiger YAMATO | from Dance Dance Revolution Extreme |
| "Look To The Sky (True Color Mix)" | SySF. feat. ANNA | from Dance Dance Revolution Extreme |
| "魔法の扉 (スペース☆マコのテーマ)" (Mahōu no Tobira (SPACE@MACO no Theme)) | a.s.a. | from Dance Dance Revolution Extreme |
| "MEMORIES" | NAOKI feat. PAULA TERRY | from Dance Dance Revolution Extreme |
| "MOBO☆MOGA" | Orange Lounge | from Dance Dance Revolution Extreme |
| "ever snow" | YOMA KOMATSU | from DDRMAX2 Dance Dance Revolution 7thMix |
| "祭 JAPAN (FROM NONSTOP MEGAMIX)" (Matsuri JAPAN (FROM NONSTOP MEGAMIX)) | RE-VENGE | from DDRMAX2 Dance Dance Revolution 7thMix |
| "DIVE (more deep & deeper style)" | BeForU | from DDRMAX Dance Dance Revolution 6thMix |
| "Do It Right" | SOTA feat. Ebony Fay | from DDRMAX Dance Dance Revolution 6thMix |
| "Firefly" | BeForU | from DDRMAX Dance Dance Revolution 6thMix |
| "Groove" | Sho-T feat. Brenda | from DDRMAX Dance Dance Revolution 6thMix |
| "Groove 2001" | Sho-T feat. Brenda | from DDRMAX Dance Dance Revolution 6thMix |
| "Look To The Sky" | SySF. feat. ANNA | from DDRMAX Dance Dance Revolution 6thMix |
| "Midnite Blaze" | U1 Jewel Style | from DDRMAX Dance Dance Revolution 6thMix |
| "ON THE JAZZ" | Jonny Dynamite! | from DDRMAX Dance Dance Revolution 6thMix |
| "Share My Love" | Julie Frost | from DDRMAX Dance Dance Revolution 6thMix |
| "祭 JAPAN" (Matsuri JAPAN) | RE-VENGE | from Dance Dance Revolution 5thMix |
| "Remember You" | NM feat. Julie | from Dance Dance Revolution 5thMix |
| "LUV TO ME (AMD MIX)" | DJ KAZU feat. tiger YAMATO | from Dance Dance Revolution 3rdMix |
| "5.1.1." | dj nagureo | from Dance Dance Revolution 2ndMix Club Version |
| "LUV TO ME (disco mix)" | tiger YAMATO | from Dance Dance Revolution 2ndMix Club Version |
| "R3" | tiger YAMATO | from Dance Dance Revolution 2ndMix Club Version |
Absent songs (9 total)
| "Freedom" | BeForU | from Dance Dance Revolution SuperNova |
| "ヒマワリ" (Himawari) | RIYU from BeForU | from Dance Dance Revolution SuperNova |
| "Under The Sky" | 南さやか (BeForU) with platoniX | from Dance Dance Revolution SuperNova |
| "GRADUATION ~それぞれの明日~" (GRADUATION ~Sorezore no Ashita~) | BeForU | from Dance Dance Revolution Extreme |
| "LOVE♥SHINE" | 小坂りゆ | from Dance Dance Revolution Extreme |
| "♥Love²シュガ→♥" (♥Love²Sugar→♥) | dj TAKA feat. のりあ | from Dance Dance Revolution Extreme |
| "TEARS" | NAOKI underground feat. EK | from Dance Dance Revolution Extreme |
| "BRE∀K DOWN!" | BeForU | from DDRMAX2 Dance Dance Revolution 7thMix |
| "CANDY♥" | 小坂りゆ | from DDRMAX2 Dance Dance Revolution 7thMix |
Absent outside of Asia (4 total)
| "DYNAMITE RAVE -super euro version-" | NAOKI with Y&Co. | from Dance Dance Revolution SuperNova |
| "DYNAMITE RAVE (Down Bird SOTA Mix)" | NAOKI | from Dance Dance Revolution Extreme |
| "DYNAMITE RAVE (B4 ZA BEAT MIX)" | NAOKI | from DDRMAX2 Dance Dance Revolution 7thMix |
| "END OF THE CENTURY" | NO.9 | from Dance Dance Revolution 3rdMix |

=== Course ===
This is the list of courses on the arcade version. There are 3 types of courses, CONCEPT COURSE, DRILL COURSE, and RANKING COURSE. The color indicates the difficulty played. The number next to the song refers to the song difficulties. Yellow represents Basic. Fuchsia represents Difficult. Green represents Expert. Purple represents Challenge.

==== Concept Course ====
The Concept Course is the usually-themed course from previous games. This is considered as a replacement to both Nonstop and Challenge modes.

| Name | Normal (Single/Double) | Difficult (Single/Double) |
|---|---|---|
BIG STAGE
| BIG STAGE | 1. "Always on My Mind" (4/3) | 1. "Always on My Mind" (5/5) |
| BIG STAGE | 2. "旅人" (3/4) | 2. "旅人" (6/6) |
| BIG STAGE | 3. "U Can't Touch This" (3/3) | 3. "U Can't Touch This" (6/6) |
| BIG STAGE | 4. "Trickster" (5/5) | 4. "Trickster" (7/7) |
SWEET PARTY
| SWEET PARTY | 1. "Big Girls Don't Cry" (4/4) | 1. "Big Girls Don't Cry" (7/7) |
| SWEET PARTY | 2. "スキ☆メロ" (6/5) | 2. "スキ☆メロ" (8/8) |
| SWEET PARTY | 3. "Slip Out" (3/5) | 3. "Slip Out" (7/6) |
| SWEET PARTY | 4. "ポリリズム" (8/9) | 4. "ポリリズム" (10/10) |
The Return of the Dance King
| The Return of the Dance King | 1. "Boys (2008 X-edit)" (5/5) | 1. "Boys (2008 X-edit)" (8/7) |
| The Return of the Dance King | 2. "GET UP'N MOVE (2008 X-edit)" (6/6) | 2. "GET UP'N MOVE (2008 X-edit)" (7/7) |
| The Return of the Dance King | 3. "DUB-I-DUB (2008 X-edit)" (7/7) | 3. "DUB-I-DUB (2008 X-edit)" (9/9) |
| The Return of the Dance King | 4. "Butterfly (2008 X-edit)" (8/7) | 4. "Butterfly (2008 X-edit)" (11/11) |
Special For Special
| Special For Special | 1. "世界は踊る" (3/2) | 1. "世界は踊る" (7/6) |
| Special For Special | 2. "Ghetto Blasta Deluxe" (5/5) | 2. "Ghetto Blasta Deluxe" (7/8) |
| Special For Special | 3. "We've Got To Make It Tonight" (8/7) | 3. "We've Got To Make It Tonight" (9/9) |
| Special For Special | 4. "Koko Soko" (7/8) | 4. "Koko Soko" (9/10) |
Dance Dream
| Dance Dream | 1. "Dance Celebration" (5/6) | 1. "Dance Celebration" (8/7) |
| Dance Dream | 2. "Dance Floor" (5/5) | 2. "Dance Floor" (6/7) |
| Dance Dream | 3. "Dance Celebration (System 7 Remix)" (9/8) | 3. "Dance Celebration (System 7 Remix)" (13/13) |
| Dance Dream | 4. "Dance Dance Revolution" (8/8) | 4. "Dance Dance Revolution" (12/12) |
Unrestrained Timing
| Unrestrained Timing | 1. "un deux trois" (4/4) | 1. "un deux trois" (8/6) |
| Unrestrained Timing | 2. "S・A・G・A" (7/6) | 2. "S・A・G・A" (10/10) |
| Unrestrained Timing | 3. "Poseidon" (9/9) | 3. "Poseidon" (11/11) |
| Unrestrained Timing | 4. "桜" (11/11) | 4. "桜" (13/13) |
BASE CAMP
| BASE CAMP | 1. "Slip Out" (3/5) | 1. "Slip Out" (7/6) |
| BASE CAMP | 2. "Taj He Spitz" (4/5) | 2. "Taj He Spitz" (7/7) |
| BASE CAMP | 3. "Dance Celebration" (8/7) | 3. "Dance Celebration" (11/10) |
| BASE CAMP | 4. "SABER WING" (10/10) | 4. "SABER WING" (13/13) |
EXPEDITION
| EXPEDITION | 1. "Slip Out (bounce in beat mix)" (4/6) | 1. "Slip Out (bounce in beat mix)" (6/7) |
| EXPEDITION | 2. "Taj He Spitz (Tommie Sunshine's Brooklyn Fire Re-Touch)" (5/6) | 2. "Taj He Spitz (Tommie Sunshine's Brooklyn Fire Re-Touch)" (8/7) |
| EXPEDITION | 3. "Dance Celebration (System 7 Remix)" (9/8) | 3. "Dance Celebration (System 7 Remix)" (13/13) |
| EXPEDITION | 4. "SABER WING (Akira Ishihara Headshot mix)" (11/11) | 4. "SABER WING (Akira Ishihara Headshot mix)" (15/15) |
MOVIE X
| MOVIE X | 1. "旅人" (3/4) | 1. "旅人" (6/6) |
| MOVIE X | 2. "凛として咲く花の如く" (6/5) | 2. "凛として咲く花の如く" (8/7) |
| MOVIE X | 3. "30 Lives (Up-Up-Down-Dance Mix)" (4/3) | 3. "30 Lives (Up-Up-Down-Dance Mix)" (6/6) |
| MOVIE X | 4. "零 -ZERO-" (8/8) | 4. "零 -ZERO-" (11/11) |
| MOVIE X | 5. "Here It Goes Again" (8/7) | 5. "Here It Goes Again" (10/10) |
Boss Rush X
| Boss Rush X | 1. "On The Break" (10/9) | 1. "On The Break" (13/13) |
| Boss Rush X | 2. "SABER WING" (10/10) | 2. "SABER WING" (13/13) |
| Boss Rush X | 3 "Horatio" (15/14) | 3. "Horatio" (15/14) |
| Boss Rush X | 4. "SABER WING (Akira Ishihara Headshot mix)" (15/15) | 4. "SABER WING (Akira Ishihara Headshot mix)" (17/17) |
| Boss Rush X | 5. "on the bounce" (14/14) | 5. "on the bounce" (16/15) |
| Boss Rush X | 6. "Trigger" (16/16) | 6. "Trigger" (18/18) |

==== Drill Course ====
The Drill Course is used to measure the dance level of players, with each song grows harder as they level up (similar to Danintei Mode from Beatmania IIDX). The courses are also different in Single and Double Play. There is only one difficulty per course.

| Name | Difficulty |
|---|---|
Lv. 1 (Single)
| Lv. 1 (Single) | 1. "MAXIMIZER" (6) |
| Lv. 1 (Single) | 2. "Quickening" (6) |
| Lv. 1 (Single) | 3. "BRILLIANT 2U" (6) |
| Lv. 1 (Single) | 4 "My Only Shining Star" (7) |
Lv. 1 (Double)
| Lv. 1 (Double) | 1. "JANEJANA" (6) |
| Lv. 1 (Double) | 2. "Poseidon" (6) |
| Lv. 1 (Double) | 3. "Why not" (6) |
| Lv. 1 (Double) | 4. "SUNKiSS♥DROP" (7) |
Lv. 2 (Single)
| Lv. 2 (Single) | 1. "CURUS" (7) |
| Lv. 2 (Single) | 2. "LEADING CYBER" (8) |
| Lv. 2 (Single) | 3. "AFRONOVA" (9) |
| Lv. 2 (Single) | 4. "TRIP MACHINE" (9) |
Lv. 2 (Double)
| Lv. 2 (Double) | 1. "MAKE IT BETTER" (7) |
| Lv. 2 (Double) | 2. "V (for EXTREME)" (7) |
| Lv. 2 (Double) | 3. "stealth" (8) |
| Lv. 2 (Double) | 4. "TRIP MACHINE PhoeniX" (8) |
Lv. 3 (Single)
| Lv. 3 (Single) | 1. "Dance Dance Revolution" (8) |
| Lv. 3 (Single) | 2. "DoLL" (8) |
| Lv. 3 (Single) | 3. "xenon" (10) |
| Lv. 3 (Single) | 4. "PARANOiA" (11) |
Lv. 3 (Double)
| Lv. 3 (Double) | 1. "Unreal" (8) |
| Lv. 3 (Double) | 2. "321STARS" (8) |
| Lv. 3 (Double) | 3. "BRILLIANT 2U" (9) |
| Lv. 3 (Double) | 4. "GENOM SCREAMS" (9) |
Lv. 4 (Single)
| Lv. 4 (Single) | 1. "DROP OUT" (10) |
| Lv. 4 (Single) | 2. "ABSOLUTE" (11) |
| Lv. 4 (Single) | 3. "Unreal" (12) |
| Lv. 4 (Single) | 4. "The Least 100sec" (12) |
Lv. 4 (Double)
| Lv. 4 (Double) | 1. "TRIP MACHINE ~luv MIX~" (10) |
| Lv. 4 (Double) | 2. "華爛漫 -Flowers-" (11) |
| Lv. 4 (Double) | 3. "Electrified" (11) |
| Lv. 4 (Double) | 4. "CANDY☆" (11) |
Lv. 5 (Single)
| Lv. 5 (Single) | 1. "Polovtsian Dances And Chorus" (11) |
| Lv. 5 (Single) | 2. "TRIP MACHINE PhoeniX" (11) |
| Lv. 5 (Single) | 3. "VANITY ANGEL" (12) |
| Lv. 5 (Single) | 4. "V (for EXTREME)" (13) |
Lv. 5 (Double)
| Lv. 5 (Double) | 1. "革命" (11) |
| Lv. 5 (Double) | 2. "TSUGARU" (12) |
| Lv. 5 (Double) | 3. "La Señorita" (13) |
| Lv. 5 (Double) | 4. "exotic ethnic" (13) |
Lv. 6 (Single)
| Lv. 6 (Single) | 1. "SUNKiSS♥DROP" (12) |
| Lv. 6 (Single) | 2. "CAN'T STOP FALLIN' IN LOVE (SPEED MIX)" (12) |
| Lv. 6 (Single) | 3. "Across the nightmare" (13) |
| Lv. 6 (Single) | 4. "Pluto" (14) |
Lv. 6 (Double)
| Lv. 6 (Double) | 1. "CAN'T STOP FALLIN' IN LOVE (SPEED MIX)" (12) |
| Lv. 6 (Double) | 2. "iFUTURELIST (DDR VERSION)" (13) |
| Lv. 6 (Double) | 3. "AA" (13) |
| Lv. 6 (Double) | 4. "Pluto" (14) |
Lv. 7 (Single)
| Lv. 7 (Single) | 1. "bag" (14) |
| Lv. 7 (Single) | 2. "Xepher" (15) |
| Lv. 7 (Single) | 3. "Arrabbiata" (15) |
| Lv. 7 (Single) | 4. "MAX 300" (15) |
Lv. 7 (Double)
| Lv. 7 (Double) | 1. "Fly away -mix del matador-" (13) |
| Lv. 7 (Double) | 2. "bag" (14) |
| Lv. 7 (Double) | 3. "DoLL" (14) |
| Lv. 7 (Double) | 4. "MAX 300" (15) |
Lv. 8 (Single)
| Lv. 8 (Single) | 1. "この子の七つのお祝いに" (14) |
| Lv. 8 (Single) | 2. "PARANOIA survivor MAX" (15) |
| Lv. 8 (Single) | 3. "MAXX UNLIMITED" (15) |
| Lv. 8 (Single) | 4. "MAX 300 (Super-Max-Me Mix)" (16) |
Lv. 8 (Double)
| Lv. 8 (Double) | 1. "Healing Vision (Angelic mix)" (14) |
| Lv. 8 (Double) | 2. "Xepher" (15) |
| Lv. 8 (Double) | 3. "PARANOiA -Respect-" (15) |
| Lv. 8 (Double) | 4. "Arrabbiata" (16) |
Lv. 9 (Single)
| Lv. 9 (Single) | 1. "NGO" (15) |
| Lv. 9 (Single) | 2. "CHAOS" (16) |
| Lv. 9 (Single) | 3. "Trim" (16) |
| Lv. 9 (Single) | 4. "Pluto Relinquish" (17) |
Lv. 9 (Double)
| Lv. 9 (Double) | 1. "CHAOS" (16) |
| Lv. 9 (Double) | 2. "PARANOIA survivor MAX" (16) |
| Lv. 9 (Double) | 3. "MAX 300 (Super-Max-Me Mix)" (17) |
| Lv. 9 (Double) | 4. "Fascination ~eternal love mix~" (17) |
Lv. 10 (Single)
| Lv. 10 (Single) | 1. "Fascination MAXX" (17) |
| Lv. 10 (Single) | 2. "PARANOiA ~HADES~" (18) |
| Lv. 10 (Single) | 3. "Healing-D-Vision" (18) |
| Lv. 10 (Single) | 4. "Trigger" (18) |
Lv. 10 (Double)
| Lv. 10 (Double) | 1. "PARANOiA ~HADES~" (17) |
| Lv. 10 (Double) | 2. "Pluto Relinquish" (18) |
| Lv. 10 (Double) | 3. "Healing-D-Vision" (18) |
| Lv. 10 (Double) | 4. "Trigger" (18) |

==== Ranking Course ====
As the name implies, this course is used specifically for Internet Ranking.

| Name | Normal (Single/Double) | Difficult (Single/Double) |
|---|---|---|
RANKING COURSE 1
| RANKING COURSE 1 | 1. "1998" (4/5) | 1. "1998" (9/9) |
| RANKING COURSE 1 | 2. "Dance Dance Revolution" (6/6) | 2. "Dance Dance Revolution" (12/12) |
| RANKING COURSE 1 | 3. "will" (7/7) | 3. "will" (11/10) |
| RANKING COURSE 1 | 4. "Flourish" (8/8) | 4. "Flourish" (10/10) |
RANKING COURSE 2
| RANKING COURSE 2 | 1. "Koko Soko" (5/6) | 1. "Koko Soko" (7/8) |
| RANKING COURSE 2 | 2. "Boys (2008 X-edit)" (5/5) | 2. "Boys (2008 X-edit)" (6/7) |
| RANKING COURSE 2 | 3. "GOLDEN SKY" (6/5) | 3. "GOLDEN SKY" (8/9) |
| RANKING COURSE 2 | 4. "Butterfly (2008 X-edit)" (8/7) | 4. "Butterfly (2008 X-edit)" (11/11) |
| RANKING COURSE 2 | 5. "A Geisha's Dream" (9/8) | 5. "A Geisha's Dream" (11/12) |
RANKING COURSE 3
| RANKING COURSE 3 | 1. "U Can't Touch This" (3/3) | 1. "U Can't Touch This" (10/10) |
| RANKING COURSE 3 | 2. "Put 'Em Up" (4/3) | 2. "Put 'Em Up" (9/10) |
| RANKING COURSE 3 | 3. "Always on My Mind" (5/5) | 3. "Always on My Mind" (8/9) |
| RANKING COURSE 3 | 4. "Here It Goes Again" (8/7) | 4. "Here It Goes Again" (10/10) |
RANKING COURSE 4
| RANKING COURSE 4 | 1. "ポリリズム" (4/4) | 1. "ポリリズム" (8/9) |
| RANKING COURSE 4 | 2. "スキ☆メロ" (6/5) | 2. "スキ☆メロ" (8/8) |
| RANKING COURSE 4 | 3. "旅人" (6/6) | 3. "旅人" (8/8) |
| RANKING COURSE 4 | 4. "世界は踊る" (7/6) | 4. "世界は踊る" (10/9) |
| RANKING COURSE 4 | 5. "Trickster" (7/7) | 5. "Trickster" (9/9) |
RANKING COURSE 5
| RANKING COURSE 5 | 1. "PARANOiA" (8/8) | 1. "PARANOiA" (11/11) |
| RANKING COURSE 5 | 2. "Butterfly (2008 X-edit)" (5/5) | 2. "Butterfly (2008 X-edit)" (11/11) |
| RANKING COURSE 5 | 3. "DUB-I-DUB (2008 X-edit)" (9/9) | 3. "DUB-I-DUB (2008 X-edit)" (11/13) |
| RANKING COURSE 5 | 4. "Boys (2008 X-edit)" (6/7) | 4. "Boys (2008 X-edit)" (10/8) |
RANKING COURSE 6
| RANKING COURSE 6 | 1. "華爛漫 -Flowers-" (5/4) | 1. "華爛漫 -Flowers-" (11/11) |
| RANKING COURSE 6 | 2. "STARS☆☆☆ (Re-tuned by HΛL) -DDR EDITION-" (5/6) | 2. "STARS☆☆☆ (Re-tuned by HΛL) -DDR EDITION-" (9/10) |
| RANKING COURSE 6 | 3. "夢幻ノ光" (8/8) | 3. "夢幻ノ光" (11/11) |
| RANKING COURSE 6 | 4. "DoLL" (8/8) | 4. "DoLL" (13/14) |
| RANKING COURSE 6 | 5. "零 -ZERO-" (8/8) | 5. "零 -ZERO-" (11/11) |
RANKING COURSE 7
| RANKING COURSE 7 | 1. "革命" (5/4) | 1. "革命" (12/11) |
| RANKING COURSE 7 | 2. "V (for EXTREME)" (5/5) | 2. "V (for EXTREME)" (12/11) |
| RANKING COURSE 7 | 3. "No. 13" (9/9) | 3. "No. 13" (13/12) |
| RANKING COURSE 7 | 4. "Übertreffen" (8/8) | 4. "Übertreffen" (13/12) |
RANKING COURSE 8
| RANKING COURSE 8 | 1. "BURNIN' THE FLOOR" (5/5) | 1. "BURNIN' THE FLOOR" (8/7) |
| RANKING COURSE 8 | 2. "D2R" (4/4) | 2. "D2R" (11/11) |
| RANKING COURSE 8 | 3. "STILL IN MY HEART" (6/6) | 3. "STILL IN MY HEART" (10/9) |
| RANKING COURSE 8 | 4. "BRILLIANT 2U" (6/7) | 4. "BRILLIANT 2U" (10/9) |
| RANKING COURSE 8 | 5. "B4U" (7/8) | 5. "B4U" (10/10) |

=== PlayStation 2 ===
==== North American Version ====
This is the soundtrack for the North American PlayStation 2 release of Dance Dance Revolution X. The game was released September 16, 2008.

| Song | Artist | Note |
Licensed songs (26 total)
| "30 Lives (Up-Up-Down-Dance Mix)" | The Motion Sick | from the album The truth will catch you, just wait... |
| "Always On My Mind" | Pet Shop Boys | from the album Introspective |
| "Big Girls Don't Cry" | Purefocus | cover of Fergie |
| "BOY (DJ Irene Rockstar Mix)" | Book of Love | from the album Future Retro |
| "Boys (2008 X-edit)" | SMiLE.dk | from Dancemania X1 original cut from Dance Dance Revolution 2ndMix |
| "Butterfly (2008 X-edit)" | SMiLE.dk | from Dancemania 10 original cut from Dance Dance Revolution |
| "DUB-I-DUB (2008 X-edit)" | ME & MY | from Dancemania EXTRA original cut from Dance Dance Revolution 2ndMix |
| "Feel" | Neuropa | A Different Drum license from the album The Blitz |
| "GET UP'N MOVE (2008 X-edit)" | S&K | from Dancemania BASS#2 original cut from Dance Dance Revolution 2ndMix |
| "Ghetto Blasta Deluxe" | Audio Magnetics | |
| "Happy" | Fischerspooner | from the album Odyssey |
| "Here It Goes Again" | OK Go | from the album Oh No |
| "Here We Go" | Ozomatli | from the album Don't Mess with the Dragon |
| "HERO (2008 X-edit)" | PAPAYA | from Dancemania EXTRA original cut from Dance Dance Revolution 2ndMix |
| "Make Me Cry" | Junk Circuit | A Different Drum license from the album Chasm [Extended Mixes] |
| "Open" | Dub Pistols | from the album Speakers and Tweeters |
| "Put 'Em Up" | Edun | |
| "Reach Up" | Alien Six | A Different Drum license |
| "Sound Of Freedom" | Bob Sinclar | from the album Soundz of Freedom |
| "Swingin'" | Bill Hamel & Naughty G. | cover of Blu Cantrell |
| "Synthesized" | The Epoxies | from the album Stop the Future |
| "Till the lonely's gone" | Z-licious | |
| "U Can't Touch This" | MC Hammer | from the album Please Hammer, Don't Hurt 'Em |
| "We Come Alive" | Alien Six | A Different Drum license |
| "We've Got To Make It Tonight" | Babamars | from the album Surprising Twists |
| "Wine Red (Tommie Sunshine's Brooklyn Fire Retouch)" | The Hush Sound | from the album Ultra.Rock Remixed |
Konami Original songs (37 total)
| "Blind Justice ~Torn souls, Hurt Faiths~" | Zektbach | from beatmania IIDX 14 GOLD |
| "Bloody Tears (IIDX EDITION)" | DJ YOSHITAKA | from beatmania IIDX 13 DistorteD |
| "Dance Celebration" | Bill Hamel feat. kevens | from Dance Dance Revolution X |
| "Dance Celebration (System7 Remix)" | Bill Hamel feat. kevens | from Dance Dance Revolution X |
| "Dance Floor" | neuras feat. Yurai | from Dance Dance Revolution X |
| "Dream Machine" | Darwin | from Dance Dance Revolution X |
| "Flight of the Phoenix" | Jena Rose | from Dance Dance Revolution X |
| "Flourish" | sonic-coll. feat. frances maya | from Dance Dance Revolution X |
| "GIRIGILI Burning 24H!" | Cheki-ROWS | from Dance Dance Revolution SuperNova 2 |
| "Inspiration" | DKC Crew | from Dance Dance Revolution X |
| "Lift You Up" | wolli | from Dance Dance Revolution X |
| "Party Lights" | Tommie Sunshine | from Dance Dance Revolution X |
| "Playa (Original Mix)" | Hamel and St.Croix feat. Jules Mari | from Dance Dance Revolution X |
| "Poseidon" | NAOKI underground | from Dance Dance Revolution SuperNova 2 |
| "puzzle" | Nippon Shonen | from Dance Dance Revolution SuperNova 2 (JP PS2) |
| "SABER WING" | TAG | from Dance Dance Revolution X |
| "S・A・G・A" | Veeton | from Dance Dance Revolution SuperNova 2 (JP PS2) |
| "Saturn" | Mr. Saturn | from Dance Dance Revolution SuperNova 2 |
| "Shades of Grey" | Fracus | from Dance Dance Revolution SuperNova 2 |
| "Slip Out" | Harmony machine | from Dance Dance Revolution X |
| "Slip Out (bounce in beat mix)" | Harmony machine | from Dance Dance Revolution X |
| "SOUL CRASH" | nc ft. HARDCORE NATION | from Dance Dance Revolution SuperNova (JP PS2) |
| "stealth" | DAISUKE ASAKURA | from Dance Dance Revolution SuperNova 2 |
| "SUNKiSS♥DROP" | jun with Alison | from Dance Dance Revolution SuperNova 2 |
| "switch" | DAISUKE ASAKURA ex. TЁЯRA | from Dance Dance Revolution SuperNova 2 |
| "Taj He Spitz" | DKC Crew | from Dance Dance Revolution X |
| "Taj He Spitz (Tommie Sunshine's Brooklyn Fire Re-Touch)" | DKC Crew | from Dance Dance Revolution X |
| "Take A Chance" | neuras feat. GATZ | from Dance Dance Revolution X |
| "Ticket To Bombay" | Jena Rose | from Dance Dance Revolution X |
| "TimeHollow" | Masanori Akita | from Dance Dance Revolution SuperNova 2 (JP PS2); Theme song of Time Hollow |
| "Tracers (4Beat Remix)" | Ruffage & Size | from Dance Dance Revolution X |
| "Trust -Dance Dance Revolution mix-" | Tatsh feat. Yoko | from Dance Dance Revolution SuperNova 2 from 天元突破グレンラガン |
| "Uranus" | Tatsh SN2 Style | from Dance Dance Revolution SuperNova 2 |
| "Venus" | Tatsh+RayZY | from GuitarFreaks V3 & DrumMania V3 |
| "Votum stellarum ~forest #25 DDR RMX~" | iconoclasm | from pop'n music 15 ADVENTURE |
| "Waiting 4 u" | DDT | from Dance Dance Revolution X |
| "Why not" | Darwin | from Dance Dance Revolution SuperNova 2 |
Xmixes (5 total)
| "Xmix1 (Midnight Dawn)" | dj jiggens | Xmix |
| "Xmix2 (Beats 'n' Bangs)" | DJ Inhabit | Xmix |
| "Xmix3 (Stomp Dem Groove)" | dj nagi | Xmix |
| "Xmix4 (Linear Momentum)" | dj jiggens | Xmix |
| "Xmix5 (Overcrush)" | DJ Inhabit | Xmix |
Boss songs (7 total)
| "On The Break" | Darwin | from Dance Dance Revolution X Accessible as FINAL STAGE#1 |
| "Horatio" | OR-IF-IS | from Dance Dance Revolution X Accessible as EXTRA STAGE#1; Accessible as FINAL STAGE#2 |
| "Trigger" | sonic-coll. | from Dance Dance Revolution X Accessible as ENCORE EXTRA STAGE#1; Accessible as EXTRA STAGE#2; Accessible as FINAL STAGE#3 |
| "on the bounce" | neuras | from Dance Dance Revolution X Accessible as ENCORE EXTRA STAGE#2; Accessible as EXTRA STAGE#3; Accessible as FINAL STAGE#4 |
| "Pluto" | Black∞Hole | from Dance Dance Revolution SuperNova 2 Accessible as ENCORE EXTRA STAGE#3; Accessible as EXTRA STAGE#4; Accessible as FINAL STAGE#5 |
| "SABER WING (AKIRA ISHIHARA Headshot mix)" | TAG | from Dance Dance Revolution X Accessible as ENCORE EXTRA STAGE#4; Accessible as EXTRA STAGE#5 |
| "Pluto Relinquish" | 2MB | from Dance Dance Revolution SuperNova 2 Accessible as ENCORE EXTRA STAGE#5 |

==== Japanese Version ====
This is the soundtrack for the Japanese PlayStation 2 release of Dance Dance Revolution X. The game was released January 29, 2009.

| Song | Artist | Note |
Licensed songs (27 total)
| "30 Lives (Up-Up-Down-Dance Mix)" | The Motion Sick | from the album The truth will catch you, just wait... |
| "Always On My Mind" | Pet Shop Boys | from the album Introspective |
| "Big Girls Don't Cry" | Purefocus | cover of Fergie |
| "BOY (DJ Irene Rockstar Mix)" | Book of Love | from the album Future Retro |
| "Boys (2008 X-edit)" | SMiLE.dk | from Dancemania X1 original cut from Dance Dance Revolution 2ndMix |
| "Butterfly (2008 X-edit)" | SMiLE.dk | from Dancemania 10 original cut from Dance Dance Revolution |
| "DUB-I-DUB (2008 X-edit)" | ME & MY | from Dancemania EXTRA original cut from Dance Dance Revolution 2ndMix |
| "Feel" | Neuropa | A Different Drum license from the album The Blitz |
| "GET UP'N MOVE (2008 X-edit)" | S&K | from Dancemania BASS#2 original cut from Dance Dance Revolution 2ndMix |
| "Ghetto Blasta Deluxe" | Audio Magnetics | |
| "Happy" | Fischerspooner | from the album Odyssey |
| "Here It Goes Again" | OK Go | from the album Oh No |
| "Koko Soko" | SMiLE.dk | from the album Party Around the World |
| "Make Me Cry" | Junk Circuit | A Different Drum license from the album Chasm [Extended Mixes] |
| "ポリリズム" (Polyrhythm) | Pink Lemonade | cover of Perfume |
| "Reach Up" | Alien Six | A Different Drum license |
| "世界は踊る" (Sekai wa Odoru) | BREAKERZ | |
| "スキ☆メロ" (Suki☆Melo) | 小倉優子 | |
| "Swingin'" | Bill Hamel & Naughty G. | cover of Blu Cantrell |
| "Synthesized" | The Epoxies | from the album Stop the Future |
| "旅人" (Tabibito) | 高杉さと美 | |
| "Till the lonely's gone" | Z-licious | |
| "Trickster" | 水樹奈々 | from the album Ultimate Diamond |
| "U Can't Touch This" | MC Hammer | from the album Please Hammer, Don't Hurt 'Em |
| "We Come Alive" | Alien Six | A Different Drum license |
| "We've Got To Make It Tonight" | Babamars | from the album Surprising Twists |
| "Wine Red (Tommie Sunshine's Brooklyn Fire Retouch)" | The Hush Sound | from the album Ultra.Rock Remixed |
New Konami Original and BEMANI crossover songs (27 total)
| "A Geisha's Dream" | NAOKI feat. SMiLE.dk | from Dance Dance Revolution X |
| "Blue Rain" | dj TAKA VS Ryu☆ | from beatmania IIDX 15 DJ TROOPERS |
| "Chance and Dice" | 日本少年 | from jubeat |
| "Dance Celebration" | Bill Hamel feat. kevens | from Dance Dance Revolution X |
| "Dance Celebration (System7 Remix)" | Bill Hamel feat. kevens | from Dance Dance Revolution X |
| "Dance Floor" | neuras feat. Yurai | from Dance Dance Revolution X |
| "Dream Machine" | Darwin | from Dance Dance Revolution X |
| "Flight of the Phoenix" | Jena Rose | from Dance Dance Revolution X |
| "Flourish" | sonic-coll. feat. frances maya | from Dance Dance Revolution X |
| "in love wit you" | Kotaro feat. Aya | New Konami Original |
| "Inspiration" | DKC Crew | from Dance Dance Revolution X |
| "Lift You Up" | wolli | from Dance Dance Revolution X |
| "Party Lights" | Tommie Sunshine | from Dance Dance Revolution X |
| "Playa (Original Mix)" | Hamel and St.Croix feat. Jules Mari | from Dance Dance Revolution X |
| "real-high-SPEED" | Makoto feat. SK | New Konami Original |
| "凛として咲く花の如く" (Rin to Shite Saku Hana no Gotoku) | 紅色リトマス | from pop'n music 15 ADVENTURE |
| "SABER WING" | TAG | from Dance Dance Revolution X |
| "Slip Out" | Harmony machine | from Dance Dance Revolution X |
| "Slip Out (bounce in beat mix)" | Harmony machine | from Dance Dance Revolution X |
| "Taj He Spitz" | DKC Crew | from Dance Dance Revolution X |
| "Taj He Spitz (Tommie Sunshine's Brooklyn Fire Re-Touch)" | DKC Crew | from Dance Dance Revolution X |
| "Take A Chance" | neuras feat. GATZ | from Dance Dance Revolution X |
| "Ticket To Bombay" | Jena Rose | from Dance Dance Revolution X |
| "Tracers (4Beat Remix)" | Ruffage & Size | from Dance Dance Revolution X |
| "Übertreffen" | TAKA respect for J.S.B. | from pop'n music 14 FEVER! |
| "Waiting 4 u" | DDT | from Dance Dance Revolution X |
| "零 -ZERO-" (ZERO) | TЁЯRA | from beatmania IIDX 14 GOLD |
Returning Konami Originals (17 total)
| "AFRONOVA PRIMEVAL" | 8 bit | from Dance Maniax |
| "Healing Vision ~Angelic mix~" | 2MB | from Dance Dance Revolution 5thMix (PS) |
| "La Señorita Virtual" | 2MB | from Dance Dance Revolution 3rdMix (PS) |
| "LOVE THIS FEELIN'" | CHANG MA | from Dance Dance Revolution 2ndReMix (PS) |
| "MAXIMIZER" | CLI-MAX S. | from Dance Dance Revolution Extreme (NA PS2) |
| "ORION.78 ~civilization mix~" | 2MB | from Dance Dance Revolution 4thMix (PS) |
| "PARANOiA KCET ~clean mix~" | 2MB | from Dance Dance Revolution (PS) |
| "PARANOiA MAX ~DIRTY MIX~" | 190 | from Dance Dance Revolution 2ndMix |
| "PARANOiA MAX ~DIRTY MIX~ (SMM Special)" | 190 | SMM Special |
| "PARANOiA Survivor" | 270 | from Dance Dance Revolution Extreme |
| "PARANOiA Survivor MAX" | 290 | from Dance Dance Revolution Extreme |
| "PARANOiA -Respect-" | .3k | from Dance Dance Revolution Party Collection |
| "SEXY PLANET" | Crystal Aliens | from Dancing Stage featuring True Kiss Destination |
| "SP-TRIP MACHINE ~JUNGLE MIX~" | DE-SIRE | from Dance Dance Revolution 2ndMix |
| "SP-TRIP MACHINE ~JUNGLE MIX~ (SMM Special)" | DE-SIRE | SMM Special |
| "TRIP MACHINE Survivor" | DE-SIRE | from Dance Dance Revolution Extreme |
| "TRIP MACHINE ~luv mix~" | 2MB | from Dance Dance Revolution 2ndReMix (PS) |
Xmixes (5 total)
| "Xmix1 (Midnight Dawn)" | dj jiggens | Xmix |
| "Xmix2 (Beats 'n' Bangs)" | DJ Inhabit | Xmix |
| "Xmix3 (Stomp Dem Groove)" | dj nagi | Xmix |
| "Xmix4 (Linear Momentum)" | dj jiggens | Xmix |
| "Xmix5 (Overcrush)" | DJ Inhabit | Xmix |
Boss songs (5 total)
| "On The Break" | Darwin | from Dance Dance Revolution X Accessible as FINAL STAGE#1 |
| "Horatio" | OR-IF-IS | from Dance Dance Revolution X Accessible as EXTRA STAGE#1; Accessible as FINAL STAGE#2 |
| "Trigger" | sonic-coll. | from Dance Dance Revolution X Accessible as ENCORE EXTRA STAGE#1; Accessible as EXTRA STAGE#2; Accessible as FINAL STAGE#3 |
| "on the bounce" | neuras | from Dance Dance Revolution X Accessible as ENCORE EXTRA STAGE#2; Accessible as EXTRA STAGE#3 |
| "SABER WING (AKIRA ISHIHARA Headshot mix)" | TAG | from Dance Dance Revolution X Accessible as ENCORE EXTRA STAGE#3 |

=== Differences ===
Due to licensing issues on certain music, in the North American and European arcades, DYNAMITE RAVE has been rerecorded and contains new lyrics and vocals. The original and all remixes of DYNAMITE RAVE as well as END OF THE CENTURY have been removed for the same reason in the North American and European arcade releases Dance Dance Revolution X, although the original version and "AIR" Special's charts were kept for the new version.

== Music ==
New music from the North American PlayStation 2 version of Dance Dance Revolution X:

"30 Lives (Up-Up-Down-Dance Mix)"
"Always on My Mind"
"Big Girls Don't Cry"
"Boy (DJ Irene Rockstar Mix)"
"Boys (2008 X-Edit)"
"Butterfly (2008 X-Edit)"
"Dance Celebration"
"Dance Celebration (System 7 Remix)"
"Dance Floor"
"Dream Machine"
"Dub-I-Dub (2008 X-Edit)"
"Feel"
"Flight of the Phoenix"
"Get Up'N Move (2008 X-edit)"
"Ghetto Blasta Deluxe"
"Happy"
"Here It Goes Again"
"Here We Go"
"Hero (2008 X-edit)"
"Horatio"
"Inspiration"
"Lift You Up"
"Make Me Cry"
"On the Break"
"On the Bounce"
"Open"
"Party Lights"
"Playa (Original Mix)"
"Put 'Em Up"
"Reach Up"
"Saber Wing"
"Saber Wing (Akira Ishihara Headshot Mix)"
"Slip Out"
"Slip Out (Bounce in Beat Mix)"
"Sound of Freedom"
"Swingin"
"Synthesized"
"Taj He Spitz"
"Taj He Spitz (Tommie Sunshine's Brooklyn Fire Re-Touch)"
"Take a Chance"
"Ticket to Bombay"
"Till The Lonely's Gone"
"Tracers (4Beat Remix)"
"Trigger"
"U Can't Touch This"
"Waiting 4 U"
"We Come Alive"
"We've Got To Make It Tonight"
"Wine Red (Tommie Sunshine's Brooklyn Fire Retouch)"
"Xmix1 (Midnight Dawn)"
"Xmix2 (Beats 'n Bangs)"
"Xmix3 (Stomp Dem Groove)"
"Xmix4 (Linear Momentum)"
"Xmix5 (Overcrush)"

== Soundtrack ==
The original soundtrack for Dance Dance Revolution X was released in Japan on January 29, 2009, coinciding with the release of the PlayStation 2 version of X. The soundtrack consists of 3 CDs, which feature the songs from the game, songs from the Wii release Full Full Party (the Japanese version of Hottest Party 2) and a nonstop megamix disc. Pre-orders of the PlayStation 2 version of X will come with the album.

=== Downloads ===
Dance Celebration, Flourish, Party Lights, and Flight of the Phoenix became available to purchase on Konami's mobile music download service on December 23, 2008.
