= All I Want (The Reverb Junkie album) =

Studio album by The Reverb Junkie
- Released: September 10, 2013
- Recorded: 2012–2013
- Genre: Electronic pop, electronica
- Length: 35:51
- Label: Independent
- Producer: The Reverb Junkie

The Reverb Junkie chronology
EP 1 (2012)	All I Want (2013)	EP 2 (2014)

"More Than Enough"

All I Want is the first solo studio album by The Reverb Junkie – producer moniker for musician Michelle Chamuel. The album was self-produced and released on September 10, 2013. The album debuted at number 6 on the U.S. Dance/Electronic Albums chart. A music video of the album's title track "All I Want" was released following the album's release. An album review called the music progressive.

== Composition ==
Chamuel called the album her "solo electronic project" and said it is quite different from anything she had done before. In describing the compositions, she wrote:

For this album, I wrote and recorded full songs, then went back and selected my favorite parts – significant words/notes/syllables/etc – and left only those parts. I got to use my voice as an instrument and play with the different sounds it can make. I wrote melodies on bass, piano, strings, synthesizer, guitar, organ, and glockenspiel. I acted like my own choir. I programmed drums [...] I kept writing and re-arranging, adding and taking away, until it sounded just how I wanted it to.

The original uncut demo of three of the songs were released as tracks 12 through 14. The male vocals are Chamuel's voice processed electronically. In an interview following the album's release, Chamuel said her studio work as The Reverb Junkie focuses on creative sound works, and it is not necessarily performative on stage. She compared the creative process to painting and sculpting with sound, where melodies are shaped as new layers are added. Regarding the album's name, she said it reflects "what I've wanted to make for a long time".

== Track listing ==
No.	Title	Length
1.	"All I Want"	2:23
2.	"Everything"	2:54
3.	"Hangin On"	2:48
4.	"Selfish"	3:22
5.	"Eyoh"	2:14
6.	"Worth"	3:04
7.	"More Than Enough"	2:53
8.	"Bit By Bit"	2:15
9.	"Tear Down Walls"	2:25
10.	"Want Me Now"	3:32
11.	"XWarmm" (bonus track)	2:28
12.	"Hangin On" (uncut studio demo)	1:44
13.	"Selfish" (uncut studio demo)	2:21
14.	"Eyoh" (uncut studio demo)	1:28

== Personnel ==
Credits adapted from Bandcamp music store.

- The Reverb Junkie – composer, arranger, performer, engineer, producer, artwork
- Tyler Duncan – stem mixing, mastering

== Charts ==
Chart (2013)	Peak position
US Heatseekers Albums (Billboard)	15
US Dance/Electronic Albums (Billboard)	6
