= Go Down Singing =

Single by Michelle Chamuel
- Released: November 19, 2013
- Recorded: 2013
- Genre: Pop
- Length: 3:48 (original), 4:05 (acoustic)
- Label: Thick Glasses Music
- Songwriters: Theo Katzman, Tyler Duncan, Michelle Chamuel
- Producers: Theo Katzman, Tyler Duncan

Michelle Chamuel singles chronology
"U and I" (2012)	"Go Down Singing" (2013)	"Made For Me" (2014)

Audio sample
- file; help

"Go Down Singing" is a single released by Michelle Chamuel in November 2013, followed by an acoustic version in December 2013. She has released several singles as The Reverb Junkie, and "Go Down Singing" is the first solo release under her own name. According to Chamuel, the song is about the potential in each person to shine. It was co-written and produced by musicians Theo Katzman and Tyler Duncan.

== Background ==
The song and lyrics were originally written by Katzman and Duncan, and the song was more about bullying. Although Chamuel had not experienced bullying, she used the song for motivation in the spring of 2013 during The Voice competitions, in order to face the pressure and find her voice. Later she rewrote the bridge and connected the song more to her experience. After the song's release, she continued collaborating with Katzman and Duncan on her next album Face the Fire.

== Reception ==
A review called the lyrics relatable and inspirational toward living one's dream in the face of criticism. Another review said the song is an anthem that will inspire many. The song reached number 12 on the iTunes Pop chart, and resultantly debuted at number 27 on the Billboard Pop Digital Songs chart. It has peaked at number 75 on the Hot Canadian Digital Songs component of the Canadian Hot 100.

== Live performances ==
On December 10, 2013, Chamuel performed the song on season 5 of The Voice, and on December 30, she performed the song on NBC's The Today Show.

== Personnel ==
Credits adapted from Bandcamp music store.

- Michelle Chamuel – writer, performer, vocals
- Theo Katzman – writer, producer, performer
- Tyler Duncan – writer, producer, performer
- Jeremy Kittel – performer on strings
- Devin Kerr – mastering

== Charts ==
Chart (2013)	Peak position
Hot Canadian Digital Songs (Billboard)	75
US Pop Digital Songs (Billboard)	27
