= Dancethink =

Studio album by My Dear Disco / Ella Riot
- Released: October 11, 2008
- Recorded: 2008
- Genre: Synth-pop, funk, rock, techno
- Length: 48:46
- Label: Independent
- Producer: My Dear Disco / Ella Riot

My Dear Disco / Ella Riot chronology
My Dear Disco EP (2007)	Dancethink (2009)	Over the Noise EP (2010)

Dancethink is the debut studio album by the Ann Arbor, Michigan-based band Ella Riot, formerly My Dear Disco.

== Background ==
The band was active from 2007 to 2011 and released two definitive works, Dancethink LP and Love Child EP. The band released two other EPs, My Dear Disco and Over the Noise, whose tracks were re-recorded and released in final form on Dancethink and Love Child – with the exception of one track titled "Over the Noise". The band also produced remix music and released a collection titled The Remixes EP.

== Style ==
Ella Riot specialized in writing and performing live dance music. The band referred to its musical style as "DanceThink Music", dance music written to stand on its own merit and to be enjoyed apart from dance. Their music combines elements from several genres including rock, jazz, electronic, pop, soul and punk. An album review characterized the music as a fusion of trance and rock music.

== Track listing ==
No.	Title	Length
1.	"White Lies"	7:26
2.	"For Your Love"	5:27
3.	"My Dear Disco"	4:53
4.	"All I Do"	5:25
5.	"Amsterdam"	4:27
6.	"The Way"	6:01
7.	"Madame Eon - Part One"	5:26
8.	"Madame Eon - Part Two"	3:18
9.	"M.Y.F. (Move Your Feet)"	6:23

== Personnel ==
Credits adapted from Bandcamp music store.

- My Dear Disco – writer, performer, producer
- Mark Saunders (Beat360 Studio) – co-producer
- "All I Do" – writer Stevie Wonder
