= Bill Hamel =

- Birth name: William Thomas Hamel
- Born: January 17, 1973
- Origin: Orlando, Florida, U.S.
- Died: June 29, 2018 (aged 45); Cocoa Beach, Florida, U.S.
- Occupations: Record producer; DJ; remixer

Bill Hamel (January 17, 1973 – June 29, 2018) was an American record producer and remixer from Orlando, Florida. He was a founding member of American trance group Fatum, and was a two-time Grammy Award nominee.

Bill Hamel was born on January 17, 1973, and died on June 29, 2018. He was 45 years old.

== Remix discography ==
- Carmen Electra – "I Like It Loud"
- Seal – "The Best of Me" on Warner Brothers
- Seal – "The Weight of My Mistakes" on Warner Brothers
- Kimberly Cole – "Smack You" on Crystal Ship
- Jason Derulo – "In My Head" on Warner Brothers
- Tegan & Sara – "Aligator" on Reprise Records
- Erika Jayne – "Pretty Mess" on E1 Music
- Jes – "Lovesong" on Blackhole Recordings
- Michael Bublé – "You Got What It Takes" on Reprise Records
- Zoot Woman – "Live in My Head"
- Seth Vogt – "Cellophane" on M-Toxin Records
- Jason Derulo – "Whatcha Say" on Warner Brothers
- U2 – "Magnificent" on Island
- Enrique Iglesias feat Kelis – "Not in Love" on Interscope
- Seal – "Amazing" on Warner Brothers
- Paramore – "Misery Business" on Atlantic
- Tegan & Sarah – "Back in Your Head" on Reprise
- Mocean Worker – "Shake Your Boogie"
- Jessie Malay – "Booty Bangs" on Warner Brothers
- Nelly Furtado – "Do It" on Interscope
- Marilyn Manson – "Heart Shaped Glasses" Interscope
- Mandy Moore – "Extraordinary" Interscope
- Ne-Yo – "All Because of You" on DefJam
- Gwen Stefani & Pharrell – "Wind It Up" on Interscope Records
- Alseep – "I Lost You" on Norway
- Carina Round – "Come to You" on Interscope
- Rihanna – "Unfaithful" on DefJam
- Korn – "Coming Undone" on Interscope
- Mobile – "Montreal Calling" on Interscope
- Madonna – "Hung Up" on Maverick
- Britney Spears – "Touch of My Hand" on Jive
- Britney Spears – "Piece of Me" on Jive (unreleased)
- Depeche Mode – "John the Revelator" on Mute
- Rene Asmez – "Fragile" on Little Mountain Recordings
- Alphaville – "Forever Young" on Warner Brothers
- Fluke – "Nobody" on Sunkissed
- New Order – "Guilt Is a Useless Emotion" on Warner Brothers
- New Order – "Krafty" on Warner Brothers
- Tonepusher's "Daydreamer" on FADE
- Andy Ling – "Fixation" (Hamel vs. Evolution Remix)
- Depeche Mode – "Enjoy the Silence" on Mute (unreleased)
- Esthero – "O.G. Bitch" on Warner Brothers
- Blue Haze – "Into Nothing" on Saw
- Brandy feat. Kanye West – "Talk About Our Love" on Atlantic
- Paul Oakenfold – "Hold Your Hand" on Maverick
- Toyshop – "Million Miles" on Sunkissed
- Holly Palmer – "Just So You Know" on Warner Brothers
- Seal – "Get It Together" on Warner Brothers (Grammy nomination for best remix)
- BT & JC Chasez – "Force of Gravity" on Nettwerk
- Brother Brown "Under The Water" on Yoshi Toshi
- Prince "When Doves Cry" white
- Justin Timberlake – "Cry Me a River" on JIVE Records (featured on Paul Oakenfold's Great Wall CD)
- Lamb – "Gabriel" on Mercury Records
- Lamb – "Gorecki" on Mercury Records
- Jan Johnson "Superstar" on Perfecto (feat on Paul Oakenfold's Ibiza CD)
- Delerium – "Innocente" on Nettwerk
- Powerplant – "Angel" (Medway & Hamel Remix)
- Jayn Hanna – "Lost Without You" on Virgin
- Red Shift – "Motivation" on Warner's F-111
- Inertia – "Vellum" on Mute's Future Groove (featured on Dave Seaman's Global Underground-Cape Town CD)
- Mara – "One" on Choo Choo Records (featured on Nick Warren's Global Underground-Budapest CD)
- Evolution – "Phoenix" on Fluid Recordings (featured on Danny Tenaglia's Global Underground-London CD)
- Andy Ling – "Calling Angels" on Fluid Recordings
- Secret Life – "She Holds the Key" on DMC

== See also ==
- Grammy Award for Best Remixed Recording, Non-Classical
