= The Drift (EP) =

EP by Michelle Chamuel & Arjun Singh
- Released: January 7, 2014
- Recorded: 2013
- Genre: Electronic pop, pop
- Length: 22:26
- Label: Independent
- Producer: Arjun Singh, Michelle Chamuel

Michelle Chamuel & Arjun Singh chronology
"Not Now" single release (2013)	The Drift (2014)	Face the Fire (2015)

The Drift is a collaborative EP by producer-composer Arjun Singh and musician Michelle Chamuel. Released in January 2014, the EP is a collection of six original songs and was in the works for about a year. The fifth track "Drift" features vocals by hip hop artist Isaac Castor in a duet with Chamuel. The second track "Not Now" had been released as a single in November 2013. The EP peaked at number 2 on the iTunes Electronic albums chart in 2014.

== Track listing ==
No.	Title	Length
1.	"Floating"	3:49
2.	"Not Now"	3:16
3.	"In My Head"	4:01
4.	"Too Fast"	3:46
5.	"Drift" (feat. Isaac Castor)	4:14
6.	"Avalanche"	3:20

== Personnel ==
Partially adapted from Michigan Radio.

- Michelle Chamuel – composer, performer, producer, vocals
- Arjun Singh – composer, performer, producer
- Isaac Castor – vocals (track 5)
- Chris Dupont – guitar (track 5)
- Nick Nagurka – mixing, editing
- Tyler Duncan – mixing, editing
- Brian Cabanatuan – mixing
- Chris Gehringer – mastering
