= KiloWatts (musician) =

Jamie Watts
- Born: James Charles Watts; January 24, 1980 (age 46)
- Genres: Art pop, electro-acoustic, downtempo, psybient, psydub
- Occupations: Producer, composer, musician
- Years active: 2002–present
- Labels: Thoughtless Music, Native State Records, KiloWatts Music, Mothership
- Member of: Voodeux, Invisible Allies, Skeetaz, KiloWatts & Vanek, Super Galactic Expansive
- Website: kilowattsmusic.com

James Charles Watts (born January 24, 1980), also known by the moniker KiloWatts, is an American electronic musician. He has toured across Australia, Canada, Europe, and the United States since 2002. His 2007 release Ground State was said to lead the devoted listener to a state of total hypnosis by Side-Line Magazine. In 2006, Igloo Magazine called his album Routes "a lifetime of travel compressed into an hour of aural head-tripping." His project with Tanner Ross, entitled Voodeux, was reviewed by XLR8R Magazine and could only be described as "...if maverick producers Ricardo Villalobos and Bruno Pronsato plundered Lustmord's harddrive full of tar-black ambience..." His collaboration with Bluetech, called Invisible Allies, was included in Headphone Commute's Best Of 2010 collection.

== Discography ==
=== KiloWatts ===
- 2002 – Perfected Everything (DayLite Records)
- 2003 – EP Phone Home (DayLite Records)
- 2005 – Pasta EP (Kahvi Collective)
- 2005 – Problem/Solving (Artificial Music Machine)
- 2005 – Problems/Solved (Artificial Music Machine)
- 2006 – Routes (Artificial Music Machine)
- 2007 – Ground State (Native State Records)
- 2007 – Quickfire (KiloWatts Music)
- 2007 – Teknopera (KiloWatts Music)
- 2007 – Uprouted (KiloWatts Music)
- 2008 – Exit The Laugh (Harmonious Discord)
- 2008 – Snakewinds (Thoughtless Music)
- 2008 – Luna Rd (Harmonious Discord)
- 2009 – Love on Saturn (Thoughtless Music)
- 2009 – Six Silicates (KiloWatts Music)
- 2009 – Undercurrent (Somnia)
- 2010 – Nocturnal Sunrise (Harmonious Discord)
- 2010 – Timekeeper (Thoughtless Music)
- 2010 – The Right Words (KiloWatts Music)
- 2012 – Acceptitude (KiloWatts Music)
- 2014 – Seven Succulents (KiloWatts Music)
- 2019 - Sympathetic Vibrations (KiloWatts Music)
- 2020 - Eight Experiments (KiloWatts Music)

=== Rena Jones & KiloWatts ===
- 2021 - Force Multiplier (Cartesian Binary Recordings)
- 2024 - Caesura (Cartesian Binary Recordings)

=== Invisible Allies ===
Invisible Allies is KiloWatts and Bluetech.

- 2010 – Hyperdimensional Animals (Native State Records)
- 2014 – Conversations With Bees (Aleph Zero Records)

=== KiloWatts and Vanek ===
KiloWatts & Vanek is James Watts and Peter Van Ewijk. Together they have released albums on Diffusion Records, founded by Andrew Sega, and German-based industrial label Dependent Records.

- 2004 – RawQ (Diffusion Records)
- 2009 – Sinnerstate (Motor Music)
- 2009 – Focus & Flow (Dependent Records)
- 2022 - Perennials (End Of Time Records)

=== Voodeux ===
Voodeux is KiloWatts and Tanner Ross, who have released on Dirtybird Records and Mothership, founded by Claude VonStroke.

- 2007 – The Curse (Mothership)
- 2009 – Bones (Mothership)
- 2009 – Just A Spoonful (Mothership)
- 2009 – The Paranormal (Mothership)

=== Skeetaz ===
Skeetaz is a collaboration between KiloWatts and Bil Bless.

- 2007 – Ma Skeeta Bytes Vol. 1 (Proboscis)
- 2007 – Skeetaz EP (Addictech Records)
- 2008 – Off (Proboscis)

=== Super Galactic Expansive ===
Super Galactic Expansive is a collaboration between KiloWatts and Amagine. They have released two albums on Sound Tribe Sector 9's label, 1320 Records.

- 2010 – Supersensible Science (1320 Records)
- 2012 – Constants + Variables (1320 Records)
- 2022 - Satellites
