= All the Pretty People =

EP by Christopher Norman & The Reverb Junkie
- Released: August 28, 2012
- Recorded: 2012
- Genre: Electronic pop, pop
- Length: 17:39
- Label: Independent
- Producer: Christopher Norman, The Reverb Junkie

Christopher Norman & The Reverb Junkie chronology
All the Pretty People (2012)	All the Pretty Remixes; EP (2013)

All the Pretty People is the first collaborative EP release by the duo Christopher Norman and The Reverb Junkie (Michelle Chamuel). It was released in August 2012. In March 2013, the duo released a five track remix compilation of the EP titled All the Pretty Remixes – each track produced by a different artist.

== Track listing ==
No.	Title	Length
1.	"You Don't Know"	3:48
2.	"Keep Pace"	3:26
3.	"Is She Gonna"	3:18
4.	"You Don't Know" (Alin Dimitriu Remix)	3:28
5.	"You Don't Know" (Clean Radio Edit)	3:09

All the Pretty Remixes EP (2013)
No.	Title	Length
1.	"Is She Gonna (Chip Charlie Remix)"	6:16
2.	"You Don't Know (Patrik Björkman Remix)"	8:46
3.	"Keep Pace (Rasmus Remix)"	7:41
4.	"Is She Gonna (Champagne Remix)"	4:56
5.	"You Don't Know (Dublin Aunts Remix)"	5:59

== Personnel ==
Credits adapted from Bandcamp music store.

- The Reverb Junkie (Michelle Chamuel) – writer, performer, producer, vocals (tracks 1, 3–5)
- Christopher Norman – writer, performer, producer, mixing, mastering, vocals (track 2)
- Casey Clark – backup vocals (tracks 1, 5)
- Ilya Goldberg – violin (track 3)
- Rena Jones – viola/cello (track 3)
- Alin Dimitriu – remix, additional production (track 4)
- Brian Son – artwork
