= Michelle Chamuel =

American singer, songwriter and music producer

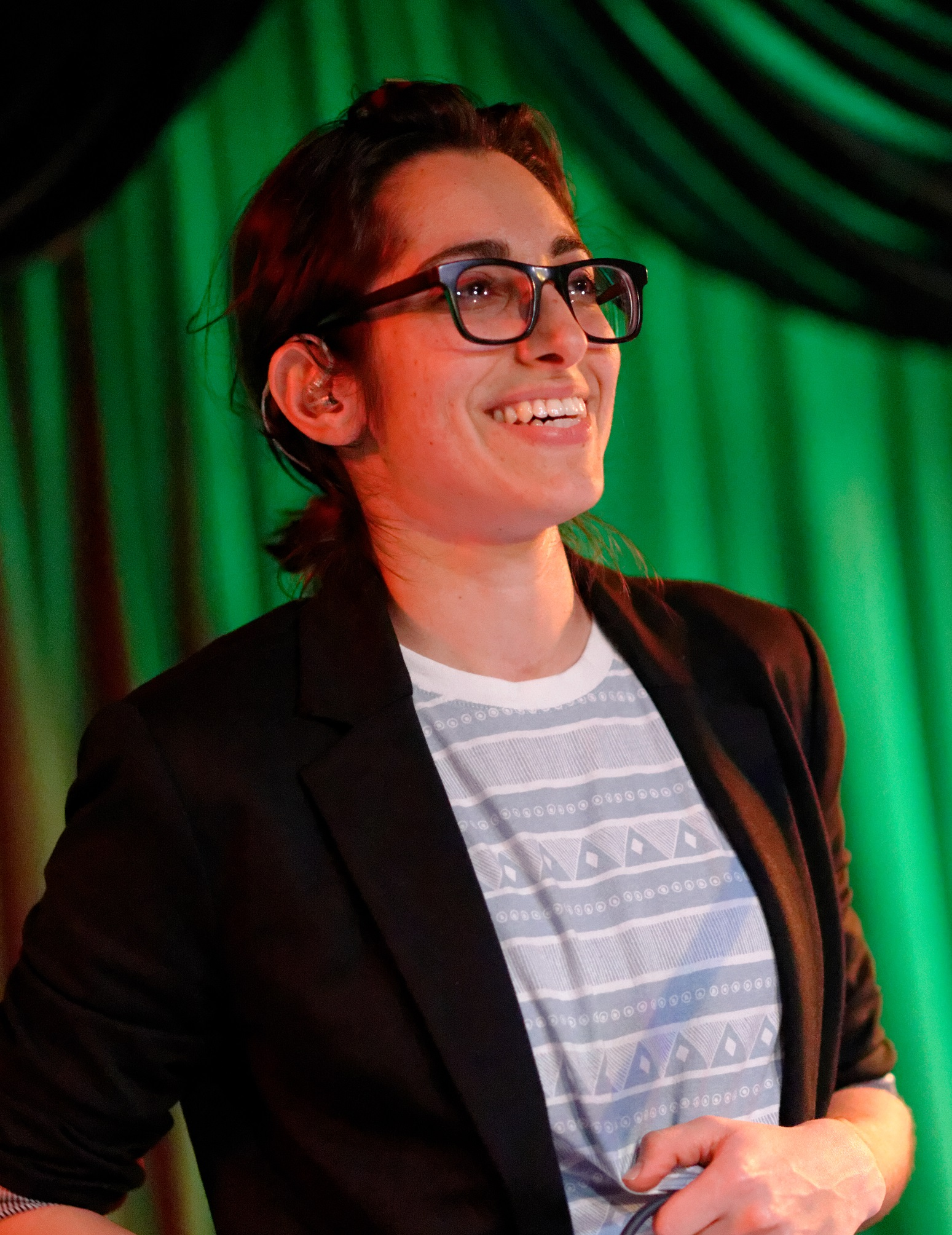
- Chamuel in 2014

Background information
- Born: c. 1986 (age 39–40); Wellesley, Massachusetts, U.S.
- Genres: Pop, electronic, acoustic, ambient, film score
- Occupations: Music producer, songwriter, vocalist
- Instruments: Vocals, piano, keyboards, synthesizer, guitar, violin
- Years active: 2007–present
- Label: Independent
- Website: michellechamuel.com

Michelle Chamuel (born c. 1986) (Note: Birth year per Smolski 2013.) is an American music producer, songwriter and vocalist. She has released several works as a solo artist and in partnership with others. Her works span various styles including pop, electronic, acoustic and ambient. Influenced by Imogen Heap and Max Martin, she is also known by her producer moniker The Reverb Junkie. Her recent works include music production for the film Glitter & Doom.

== Early life ==
Chamuel was born in Wellesley, Massachusetts. Her father was an acoustical engineer and played the violin. She began to play piano and violin at an early age and was fascinated by pop music. In seventh grade she started to sequence music on a synthesizer, sing and compose. She graduated from Wellesley High School and studied performing arts technology at the University of Michigan.

== Career ==
=== Ella Riot and early works ===
In 2007 Chamuel joined the Ann Arbor, Michigan-based band My Dear Disco, later named Ella Riot, as lead vocalist. (Note: The band names were tributes to Matthew Dear and Ella Fitzgerald.) The band toured across the United States and released the studio album Dancethink (2008) and the EP Love Child (2011). The band went into hiatus in October 2011. In 2010 Chamuel spoke about being lesbian and named Elton John and Ani DiFranco as artists she looked up to.

After Ella Riot, Chamuel released the eponymous album s/he (2011) with former bandmate Tyler Duncan, an EP titled All the Pretty People (2012) and an EP titled EP 1 (2012) with other artists. She released remix music with original lyrics. She names Max Martin and Imogen Heap as major influences. She was influenced by the vocal styles of Heap and Ella Fitzgerald and said they "opened me up to the idea that one could sing melodies like an instrument."

In 2013 she took part in season four of The Voice USA. In the blind audition she sang Katy Perry's "I Kissed a Girl" and chose Usher as her coach. Her rendition of Pink's "Just Give Me a Reason" received recognition on Pink's official website. Her rendition of Taylor Swift's "I Knew You Were Trouble" received approval from Swift and charted on the Billboard Hot 100. Over the course of ten episodes, she advanced to the finals and finished in second place.

=== Solo albums and later works ===
Chamuel released her first solo album All I Want in 2013 as The Reverb Junkie. She said her work as The Reverb Junkie centers on creative electronic music, whereas the work released under her own name has a performative and pop focus. The album reached number 6 on the U.S. Dance/Electronic Albums chart. She released a single titled "Go Down Singing" and spoke at a TEDx gathering about the connection of music to one's sense of home. In 2014 she released an EP titled The Drift with Arjun Singh and an EP titled EP 2 with David Gonzalez. In late 2014 she headlined a seventeen city U.S. tour.

In 2015 she released an album titled Face the Fire. Eric Danton of The Wall Street Journal called the album a collection of buoyant pop songs with tightly constructed hooks. The album reached number 21 on the U.S. Independent Albums chart. In late 2015 she released an EP as The Reverb Junkie titled I Am, and she co-wrote and produced "Hang Out with You", a song by singer-songwriter Mary Lambert.

In 2016 she released an EP titled Feel It and spoke about her focus on various aspects of music production. In 2017 she released an album of acoustic songs titled Insights & Turnpikes. She released two instrumental works as The Reverb Junkie including an ambient album titled The Last Person Awake. In 2020 she released a studio album titled Couldn't Stay. She produced the film score of Glitter & Doom, a 2023 musical based on the songs of Indigo Girls.

== Discography ==
Studio albums

- s/he (2011) (Note: Released as s/he)
- All I Want (2013) (Note: Released as The Reverb Junkie)
- Face the Fire (2015) (Note: Released as Michelle Chamuel)
- Insights & Turnpikes (2017)
- Couldn't Stay (2020)

Extended plays

- All the Pretty People (2012)
- EP 1 (2012)
- The Drift (2014)
- EP 2 (2014)
- I Am (2015)
- Feel It (2016)
- CUFTS (2025)

Instrumental works

- Music for: Summer Chores (Vol 1) (2017)
- The Last Person Awake (Music for: Vol 2) (2020)

Singles

- "My Dear Disco" (2006)
- "U and I" (2012)
- "Go Down Singing" (2013)
- "A Colorful Christmastime" (2020)
- "I Wish We Were Kids" (2024)
- "Lights On" (2025)
- "Wild" (2025)
- "Black Black Hoodie" (2025)
- "Knotted" (2025)

== Films ==
Year	Title	Notes	Ref.
2013	Getting Go, the Go Doc Project	Movie, soundtrack	
2019	1500 Miles	Documentary, original music	
2023	Glitter & Doom	Movie, music producer	
