= S/he (album) =

s/he

Studio album by s/he
- Released: September 13, 2011
- Recorded: 2011
- Genre: Electronic pop, electronic rock
- Length: 44:25
- Label: Independent
- Producer: Michelle Chamuel, Tyler Duncan

S/he chronology
| s/he (2011) | "U and I" single release (2012) |

"The One To Glow"

s/he is an album by the musical duo s/he, released in September 2011. The duo consists of Michelle Chamuel and Tyler Duncan, former members of the Ann Arbor, Michigan-based band Ella Riot. The album was released shortly after the band's hiatus announcement. The album credits contributions by all then-current band members and as such is the last collaborative venture of the group. An album review categorized the music as electronic-pop/rock, differentiated it from traditional synthpop, and complimented the vocal performance and incorporation of guitars and drums.

== Track listing ==
| No. | Title | Length |
|---|---|---|
| 1. | "The One To Glow" | 4:24 |
| 2. | "Here With You" | 3:54 |
| 3. | "In The Dark" | 5:29 |
| 4. | "Mr Hyde" | 4:32 |
| 5. | "Love War" | 3:27 |
| 6. | "Good To Get Away" | 3:52 |
| 7. | "Together We're Alone" | 4:29 |
| 8. | "Let Her Go" | 3:59 |
| 9. | "World Divided" | 5:22 |
| 10. | "Until Then" | 4:57 |

== Personnel ==
Credits adapted from Bandcamp music store.

- Michelle Chamuel – writer, performer, producer, recording, mixing, design, vocals
- Tyler Duncan – writer, performer, producer, recording, mixing, design
- Robert Lester – electric guitar, synthesizer
- Mike Shea – drums, percussion, glockenspiel
- Matt Henninger – bass, trumpet
- Devin Kerr – drums recording, additional mixing, mastering
- Jon Morgan – photography
- "World Divided" – written and produced by Chamuel, Duncan and Lester, programming by Lester
