= Rena Jones =

American musician, producer and audio engineer

- Also known as: Jena Rose
- Born: 1977 (age 48–49); United States
- Genres: Electro-acoustic, downtempo, ambient
- Instruments: Cello, violin, viola, keyboards, synthesizer, modular synthesizer, drum machine, bass, clarinet, French horn, drums, vocals.
- Years active: 2002–present
- Labels: Cartesian Binary, LOCI Records, Schematic, Twisted, Aleph Zero, Liquid Sound Design, Iboga, Disco Gecko, Ultimae, 1320 Records, Native State.
- Website: renamusic.com

Rena Jones (born 1977) is an American musician, producer, composer, cellist, audio engineer, technologist, and sound designer from Portland, Oregon. She composes and produces electro-acoustic, downtempo, and ambient music with an emphasis on live string instruments. She has released seven solo albums and collaborated on over 100 albums. Her latest solo album titled Love Letters was released in December 2025 and her latest collaborative album Caesura was released in October 2024.

== Life and career ==
Jones grew up in Texas and started on classical violin in second grade. She showed interest in writing music and, as a teenager, pursued electronic music. She said the freedom and flexibility that electronic music offered was very appealing to her. From 2000 to 2002, she studied sound engineering at Ex'pression College for Digital Arts in Emeryville, California. She then worked as an audio engineer and a musician in the San Francisco area. At Digidesign she worked on the development of the Pro Tools audio software. In 2006 she moved to Portland, Oregon.

Jones plays the cello, violin, keyboards, and programs the synthesizer and drums. Her musical style is based on the incorporation and "manipulation of string sounds from real acoustic violins and cellos along with purely electronic beats." She has released seven solo albums. Each album has a concept: Transmigration is about reincarnation, Driftwood is about the cycle of life, Indra's Web is about the interconnectedness of reality, and Echoes is about duality, drawing inspiration from Rumi's poetry, and her most recent album Love Letters, shares her personal journey processing a late stage ADHD diagnosis.

Along with running her own record labels Cartesian Binary Recordings and Pok Pok Records, Jones has composed for film and video games such as Dance Dance Revolution under the name Jena Rose. She was part of the Dance Dance Revolution ULTRAMIX 4 alongside artists Juno Reactor, Prodigy and others. Best known for her unique ambient-electronic music, Rena has released original compositions on groundbreaking labels such as LOCI Records, Disco Geko, Iboga, Spun Records, Aleph Zero, 1320 Records, Addictech, Ultimae, and Schematic Records, while also running her label Cartesian Binary Recordings. Jones has performed at several electronic music festivals around the world including Shambhala, Burning Man, The Secret Garden Festival, and the Glade.

Three of Jones's albums, Driftwood, Indra's Web, and Allegories were listed among Echoes radio's top 25 albums of the year in 2006 and 2009, and 2021 respectively. Her album, Echoes, features performances by musicians located remotely in London, Los Angeles and Portland, including Sophie Barker, Earl Harvin, Ilya Goldberg, Matt Robertson, Laura Scarborough and Joshua Penman. The album was listed among the top 25 albums of the month by Echoes radio in May and June 2013.

== Select Discography ==
=== Solo works ===
Year	Album
2004	Breaking the Divide
2005	Transmigration
2006	Driftwood
2009	Indra's Web
2013	Echoes
2021	Allegories

=== Collaborations ===
Year	Album	Artists
2021	Xylem	Emancipator, Rena Jones & Flowerpulse
2021	Force Multiplier	Rena Jones & KiloWatts
2024	Caesura	Rena Jones & KiloWatts

=== Compilations ===
Year	Song	Album	Artist
2005	Autumn (as Rena)	Left Coast Liquid Vol. 1	Various artists
2006	Aurora Borealis	Beneath the Surface	Various artists
2007	Driftwood	The Echoes Living Room Concerts Volume 13	Various artists
2007	Autumn Suggestion	Temple of Science	Various artists
2007	Blueshift	Floating Point 4	Dovla (2)
2007	A Curious Unraveling	Midnight Soul Dive	Various artists
2009	Photosynthesis (Nalepa Remix)	Imaginary Friends	Various artists
2010	A Thousand Times Over	Document	Various artists
2011	Ymadyn (as Rena)	Cloud 11	Various artists

=== Guest appearances ===
Year	Contribution	Song	Album	Artist
2005	Cello	Better Day	Artifact	STS9
2005	Cello	A Garland of Stars	Sines and Singularities	Bluetech
2007	Cello, violin	Straight Heat	Certified Air Raid Material	edIT
2010	Producer, mixing, cello, backup vocals	—N/a	On the Horizon	Lynx
2010	Mixing	Rising Tide (Ft. Lynx)	Blind Threshold	Beats Antique
2012	Cello, viola	Is She Gonna	All the Pretty People	Christopher Norman & The Reverb Junkie
2012	Cello, violin, bass, arrangement	Mesmer	Mercury Retrograde	Roel Funcken
2013	Cello	Galapagos	Dusk Till Dawn	Emancipator
2013	Cello	Light Up Your Lantern, and Liberte	Light Up Your Lantern	Lynx
