= Ella Riot =

American band

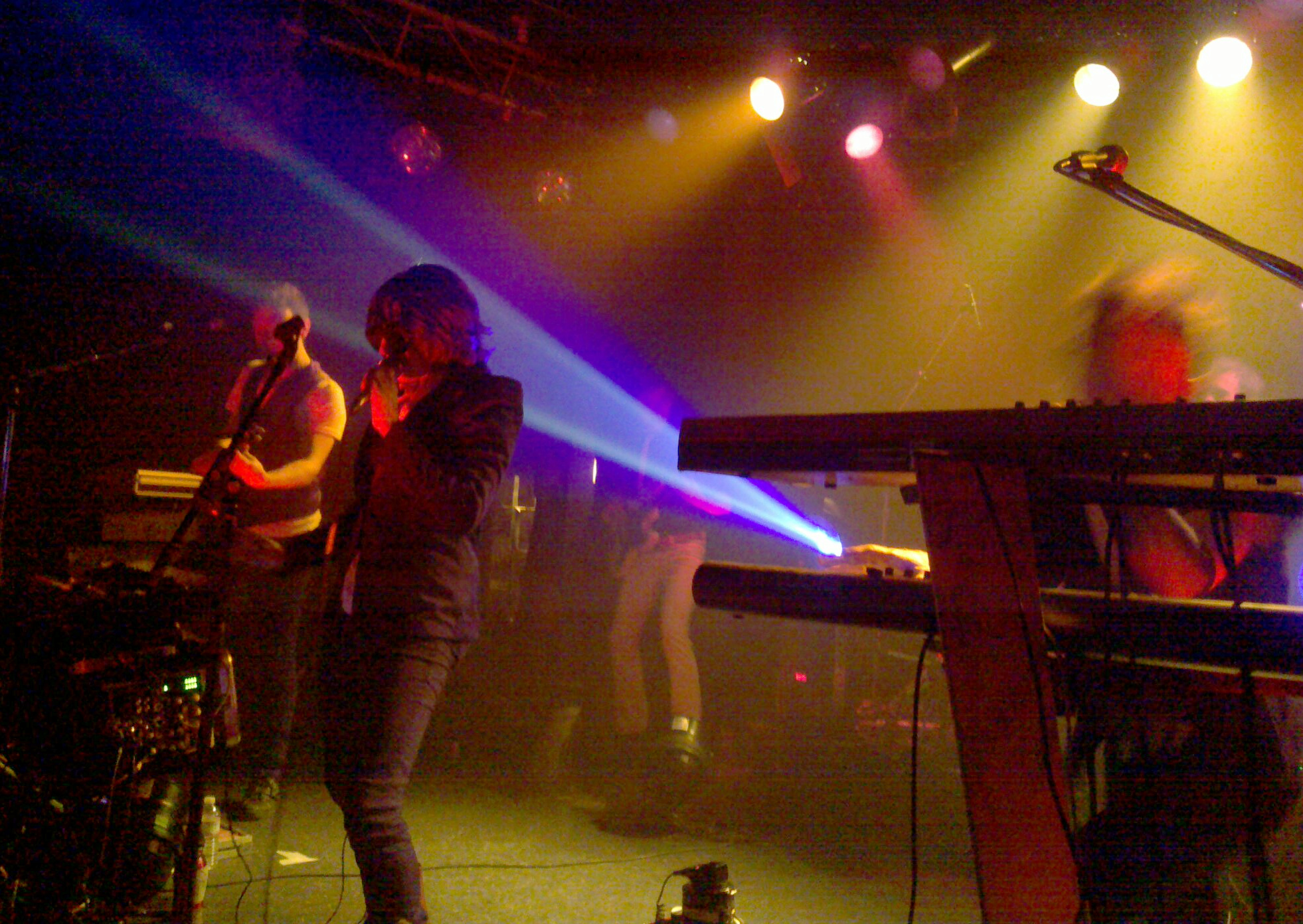
- My Dear Disco in 2010

Background information
- Origin: Michigan, United States
- Genres: Electropop, funk, rock, techno
- Years active: 2007–2011
- Past members: Tyler Duncan (founder); Michelle Chamuel (vocals); Aaron Gold (percussion); Theo Katzman (guitar); Christian Carpenter (bass); Robert Lester / Robert Lux (guitar); Joey Dosik (keyboards); Mike Shea (percussion); Joe Dart (bass); Matt Henninger (bass)

Ella Riot was a musical group based in Ann Arbor, Michigan. Founded in 2007 by Tyler Duncan as My Dear Disco, the name change came in March 2011.

The band first released the eponymous EP My Dear Disco in 2007, releasing its first album Dancethink LP in January 2009. The album fused electro-pop, funk, rock, and techno into a distinctive sound the band members have dubbed "DanceThink". The band toured extensively, released two more EPs in 2010 and their last EP Love Child in March 2011, before going into an indefinite hiatus in October 2011.

== History ==
Ella Riot, originally called My Dear Disco, evolved from founding member Duncan's 2005 instrumental endeavor, Toolbox. Duncan who played bagpipe, with percussionist Aaron Gold, guitarist Theo Katzman, and bassist Christian Carpenter, all undergraduate students at the University of Michigan - Ann Arbor, developed experimental tracks using Irish bagpipe as the lead instrument and a laptop to mix bass music and techno drum beats. Later guitarist Robert Lester and keyboardist Joey Dosik joined the group. Michelle Chamuel, a classmate of Duncan, recorded a track titled "My Dear Disco" with Lester independent of the Toolbox project. Later she worked with the band on a track titled "White Lies". The band was impressed with her vocals and asked her to join. My Dear Disco, named after musician Matthew Dear, was officially founded with her inclusion in 2007.

Duncan switched from bagpipe to synthesizer, but occasionally played bagpipe during live performances. The band members area of study at the University of Michigan included classical drum, jazz, and performing arts technology. They graduated in 2008. Around this time, the lineup changed with Mike Shea replacing Gold on drums.

Named one of the most promising college bands in the nation by the New American Music Union, the band was invited to perform at the 2008 A.E. Music Festival hosted by Anthony Kiedis. In the summer of 2008, the band performed at BlissFest, Hoxeyville, Dunegrass, Feel Good Festival, and Jazz Aspen Snowmass.

The band's debut album, Dancethink LP, was co-produced by Mark Saunders. It was released in January 2009. An album review characterized the music as having diverse influences and called it "a trance album with a rock and roll spine". The newly released techno-pop tracks earned the band a spot on the rosters of 2009 Wakarusa Festival, 10,000 Lakes Festival and South by Southwest, where they performed alongside Dave Matthews, Wilco, Widespread Panic and others. In October 2009 the band appeared on Fox 5 television show Fearless Music. The band was named BMI's Pick of the Month artist in November 2009. In 2009 the band performed over 150 shows.

Amsterdam
Sample from the 2009 Dancethink LP

Just One Way
Sample from the 2011 Love Child EP

In September 2009 Dosik left the group and relocated to California. Soon after guitarist Katzman and then in September 2010 bassist Carpenter left to pursue solo careers. Joe Dart filled in for Carpenter. Dart played bass on the 2011 Love Child EP. After Dart's departure from the group, in 2011 Matt Henninger became the next bass player. Katzman's departure in early 2010 marked the group's change from a seven-piece to a five-piece band.

The band's remix of Kanye West's "Love Lockdown" earned high praise from Arjanwrites music blog, citing the use of live instruments as a reason. The band's remix of Todd Edwards' "I Might Be" was made for and released on a Scion A/V remix collection. The two tracks were later released on the 2010 The Remixes EP. As of July 2010 the band had performed over 250 shows in a two-year period. In August 2010 the band performed at Lollapalooza music festival. In December 2010, the band completed work on their second studio release Love Child EP. It was engineered by Oliver Strauss and recorded at Mission Sound studio in New York.

In March 2011, My Dear Disco changed its name to Ella Riot, citing legal concerns and the old name's implied genre. The new name was in part a tribute to Ella Fitzgerald. In Greek, "Ella" means bright light or torch, and "Ella Riot" was a reference to the goals and image of the band. Shortly after the name change, Love Child EP was released in March 2011. Being a studio recording and final release, it was the band's second definitive work. An album review characterized the music as pop influenced by funk, techno and house, and called the approach "hardly doctrinaire". The band released a music video of the EP's fourth track "It Could Be".

In September 2011, the band announced the decision to go into an indefinite hiatus, citing the need to develop other aspects of their lives. Soon after, Duncan and Chamuel as a duo released an album titled s/he. The album credits contributions by all then-current band members. As of 2013 eight band members had continued to make music as independent artists – Duncan, Lester, Chamuel, Katzman, Dosik, Dart, Carpenter and Gold.

== Style ==
The band was influenced by Daft Punk, Justice, Brazilian Girls, and early Michael Jackson. Their music "combines elements from rock, dance, electronic, soul, punk, pop, and jazz music to engage the body and the mind". Although made for dance and live performance, the band's objective was to make music that could stand and be enjoyed on its own merit. According to an AllMusic album review, "This is fine, well-crafted music from a group with a mind of its own". According to band guitarist Lester, "It's about writing music that's as satisfying for your body as it is for your mind".

The band dubbed its musical style "DanceThink Music". In 2008 engineer Mark Saunders, who had produced Grammy-nominated albums with Shiny Toy Guns and The Cure, co-produced the band's debut album titled Dancethink in the Beat360 Studios in New York City.

== In visual media ==
In November 2009, the song "My Dear Disco" was used in a promotional commercial for Season 1 Episode 9 of Melrose Place. In 2009 the song "White Lies" was used in Season 1 Episode 11 of the online television series Little White Lie. Chamuel performed the vocals on the series' theme song "Caught In the Lie". In 2010 the song "My Dear Disco" was used in Season 1 Episode 7 of the television series Fly Girls and the song "M.Y.F. (Move Your Feet)" was used in Episode 8. In 2011 the two songs "My Dear Disco" and "Madame Eon - Part One" were used in the independent film Mooz-lum. In 2011 the song "White Lies" was used in Season 1 Episode 5 of the television series The Lying Game.

== Band as business ==
Upon their formation in 2007, band members saw themselves as a business entity, a business to support them financially. In an October 2011 interview, band founder Duncan expressed pride in the fact that they "created a business and a band where [they] were able to tour from Alaska to Texas to Cozumel to Maine," and that they ran the business themselves.

== Michelle Chamuel ==
Michelle Chamuel (born 1986), the vocalist and former member of the band took part in the fourth season of the reality television singing competition The Voice, broadcast on NBC. She was part of "Team Usher" and finished in second place. She is also known by her producer moniker "The Reverb Junkie".

== Discography ==
Studio albums

- Dancethink (2009) (as My Dear Disco)

Extended plays

- My Dear Disco (2007) (as My Dear Disco)
- Over the Noise (2010) (as My Dear Disco)
- The Remixes (2010) (as My Dear Disco)
- Love Child (2011) (as Ella Riot)

Remixes

- "Black Eyed Peas - I Gotta Feeling (Ella Riot Remix)" (2011)
