= EP 2 (Odd Year and the Reverb Junkie EP) =

EP by Odd Year & The Reverb Junkie
- Released: April 15, 2014
- Recorded: 2014
- Genre: Electronic pop, pop
- Length: 14:32
- Label: Independent
- Producer: Odd Year, The Reverb Junkie

Odd Year & The Reverb Junkie chronology
EP 1 (2012)	EP 2 (2014)	I Am (2015)

EP 2 Odd Year & The Reverb Junkie is the second collaborative project by musical duo Odd Year (David Gonzalez) and The Reverb Junkie (Michelle Chamuel). The EP was released on April 15, 2014, under the two artists' producer monikers. The fourth track "Might Not Happen" was previously released as a single on January 23, 2012.

== Track listing ==
No.	Title	Length
1.	"On The Radio"	2:40
2.	"2020"	4:39
3.	"Need To Know"	3:32
4.	"Might Not Happen"	3:41

== Personnel ==
Credits adapted from Bandcamp music store.

- The Reverb Junkie (Michelle Chamuel) – production, lyrics, vocals
- Odd Year (David Gonzalez) – production, mixing
- Devin Kerr – mastering
- Ena Bacanovic (Ruby Soho) – album art
