= Alice Edun =

Nigerian-Russian singer

- Born: Saint Petersburg, Russian SFSR, Soviet Union
- Genres: Dance; gospel
- Occupation: Singer
- Years active: 1998–present
- Labels: Off-Limits; Robbins Entertainment

Alice Edun, known professionally as Edun, is a Nigerian-Russian singer of dance and gospel music. She lives in Milan, Italy, and is signed to the Eurodance label Off-Limits and to Robbins Entertainment in the US.

== Background ==
Edun was born in Saint Petersburg to a Nigerian father and Russian mother. She studied in Nigeria and graduated from high school in 1993. Edun sang from a young age in African gospel choirs. When she moved to Italy, she sang gospel from 1998 onwards and took part in the Milan Gospel Festival in 2003. Meanwhile, she was also experimenting with R&B, soul, funk and jazz styles and performed regularly inside and outside Italy.

In 2004, Edun was chosen by the Grammy Award–winning DJ and producer Benny Benassi to perform as a vocalists for his "Benny Wants You" appeal program.

In 2005, Edun made her recording debut as featured vocalist on the track "Who's Knockin?" by the duo FB (Ferry Corsten and Benny Benassi), released by Dance Therapy, Holland. That same year, she also made her solo debut with "Put 'Em Up", a track written by Sannie Carlson and produced by Igor Farvetto. "Put 'Em Up" became a sleeper Dance anthem globally two years later, especially in the United States, and as her biggest breakthrough hit, it peaked at No. 2 on the Billboard Hot Dance Airplay chart (25 August 2007 issue). "Put 'Em Up" is a featured song in Dance Dance Revolution X, a game popular in arcades and on the PlayStation 2.

In August 2010, Edun released a follow-up titled "My Love Is Here For You". According to her, "It's a dance-pop love song, the kind that relates to everyone who is in love with someone but the other is afraid to love you back." The single was released globally through iTunes. Edun also collaborated with new producers and songwriters. She recorded and released "Survive" with Oscar Salguero via Blanco y Negro Music in Spain and Andorfine Records in Germany. Edun also recently completed new songs with the Swiss songwriter Stephen Leuenberger.
