= EP 1 (Odd Year and the Reverb Junkie EP) =

EP by Odd Year & The Reverb Junkie
- Released: September 18, 2012
- Recorded: 2012
- Genre: Electronic pop, pop
- Length: 18:28
- Label: Independent
- Producer: Odd Year, The Reverb Junkie

Odd Year & The Reverb Junkie chronology
"Might Not Happen" single release (2012)	EP 1 (2012)	EP 2 (2014)

EP 1 Odd Year & The Reverb Junkie is the first collaborative EP release by the duo Odd Year (David Gonzalez) and The Reverb Junkie (Michelle Chamuel). It was released in September 2012. The duo had previously released a single titled "Might Not Happen" in January 2012.

== Track listing ==
No.	Title	Length
1.	"Don't Say It Didn't Hurt"	4:11
2.	"Can't Make You Want Me"	3:40
3.	"It's Just the Way I Feel"	3:22
4.	"Part of You"	3:51
5.	"After Me"	3:24

== Personnel ==
Credits adapted from Bandcamp music store.

- The Reverb Junkie (Michelle Chamuel) – writer, performer, producer, vocals
- Odd Year (David Gonzalez) – writer, performer, producer, mixing
- Robert Lux (Robert Lester) – mastering
- Ena Bacanovic (Ruby Soho) – album art

== Remixes ==
- Don't Say It Didn't Hurt (Odd Year & The Reverb Junkie Club Mix)
