= Andy Ling =

British trance artist and remixer

Andy Ling is a British trance artist and remixer. He became popular due to his "Fixation" single. This reached No. 55 in the UK Singles Chart in 2000, and was released on the Hooj Choons label.

== Discography ==
=== Singles ===
- 1996 "Calling Angels"
- 1998 "Anuna"
- 1999 "Fixation"
- 2001 "Futura"
