= The Remixes (My Dear Disco EP) =

EP by My Dear Disco / Ella Riot
- Released: June 10, 2010
- Recorded: 2009–2010
- Genre: Electro-pop, techno, house
- Length: 26:02
- Label: Independent
- Producer: My Dear Disco / Ella Riot

My Dear Disco / Ella Riot chronology
Over the Noise; EP (2010)	The Remixes (2010)	Love Child; EP (2011)

The Remixes is an EP by the band Ella Riot, formerly My Dear Disco. The band was active from 2007 to 2011. Though a live performing band, electronic music production was part of their forte since their inception. The band did most of their own production work, recording and mixing, and two of its members had studied electronic music in college. The Remixes EP is a collection of their remix work from 2009–2010. The first track was made for a Scion A/V remix collection of Todd Edwards' "I Might Be". The second track was highly praised for its use of live instruments by Arjanwrites music blog.

== Track listing ==
No.	Title	Length
1.	"Todd Edwards - I Might Be (My Dear Disco Remix)"	4:51
2.	"Kanye West - Love Lockdown (My Dear Disco Remix)"	3:38
3.	"Franz Ferdinand - Ulysses (My Dear Disco Remix)"	3:52
4.	"Hearts of Palm UK - Portugal (My Dear Disco Remix)"	5:21
5.	"Boy Crisis - Dressed to Digress (My Dear Disco Remix)"	3:23
6.	"That1Guy - Mustaches (My Dear Disco Remix)"	4:57

== Personnel ==
Credits adapted from Bandcamp music store.

- My Dear Disco – producer, performer on live instruments
