= Love Child (Ella Riot EP) =

EP by Ella Riot
- Released: March 29, 2011
- Recorded: 2010–2011
- Genre: Electro-pop, funk, rock, techno
- Length: 21:04
- Label: Independent
- Producer: Ella Riot

Ella Riot chronology
| The Remixes; EP (2010) | Love Child (2011) |

Professional ratings
Review scores
| Source | Rating |
|---|---|
| AllMusic | 3.5/5 stars |

Love Child is the second studio release by Ann Arbor, Michigan-based band Ella Riot, formerly My Dear Disco. Being a studio recording and final release, Love Child is the band's second definitive work. It was engineered and recorded at Mission Sound studio. The band released a music video of the album's fourth track "It Could Be". The song's theme is "liberation" and according to band founder Tyler Duncan the video's concept is: "an unlikely person having the ideal response to our music." An album review by Mark Deming of AllMusic characterized the music as pop, influenced by funk, techno and house, and called the band's approach original. The last track "Clubbin" has bagpipes as the lead instrument, with Deming calling the fusion of bagpipes and guitars "a welcome bit of inspired lunacy".

== Track listing ==
| No. | Title | Length |
|---|---|---|
| 1. | "Just One Way" | 4:12 |
| 2. | "Karma" | 4:26 |
| 3. | "Replaceable" | 3:42 |
| 4. | "It Could Be" | 4:00 |
| 5. | "Clubbin" | 4:44 |

== Personnel ==
Credits adapted from Bandcamp music store.

- Ella Riot – writing, production
- Michelle Chamuel – lead vocals
- Tyler Duncan – synthesizer, uilleann pipes, vocals, mixing
- Robert Lester – guitar
- Mike Shea – drums
- Joe Dart – bass
- Oliver Strauss (Mission Sound) – recording, assistant production
- Devin Kerr (Good Hertz) – final mixing, assistant production
- Joe LaPorta (The Lodge) – mastering
- Jon Morgan – photography
- Andrew Le – design
