= Face the Fire =

Studio album by Michelle Chamuel
- Released: February 10, 2015
- Recorded: 2014
- Genre: Pop
- Length: 36:09
- Label: The End, Marquis(Canada)
- Producer: Michelle Chamuel, Tyler Duncan, Theo Katzman

Michelle Chamuel chronology
The Drift EP (2014)	Face the Fire (2015)	Feel It EP (2016)

Singles from Face the Fire
- 1. "Face the Fire" Released: October 7, 2014; 2. "Lottery" Released: December 1, 2014; 3. "Golden" Released: January 9, 2015

Face the Fire is the debut studio album by singer-songwriter Michelle Chamuel. The album was released on February 10, 2015. All songs were written and produced by Chamuel and collaborators Tyler Duncan and Theo Katzman. This was Chamuel's first pop album following her performances on The Voice. The songs are based on the two themes of "universal love" and "authenticity". The album debuted at number 21 on the U.S. Independent Albums chart.

== Background ==
Chamuel said as a teenager she was obsessed with Max Martin's pop hits on Top 40 radio, and in this album she wanted to produce fun, honest, well-crafted pop music. In February 2014 she got together with former bandmates Duncan and Katzman, and over a three weeks period they wrote the songs from musical nuggets they each had written in advance. The songs were then recorded, mixed and produced by the three artists along with engineer Devin Kerr, with Chamuel as the executive and vocal producer. The album's fourth track "Made for Me" was originally written for Valentine's Day 2014. The song was later revised and reproduced for the album.

Chamuel said "facing the fire" is a metaphor for doing what you believe in, having the strength to be yourself, and facing the challenges and rewards that come with it. She said the metaphor also applies to her role in the production of this album as she took full responsibility for its production and sound.

== Singles ==
The album's first single and title track, "Face the Fire", was released on October 7, 2014. The song is about the consuming desire to accomplish, one that can be either destructive or a positive guide. The album's second single, "Lottery", premiered on Billboard on December 1, 2014. The song is about taking a chance on love knowing the uncertainty involved. "Golden", the album's third track premiered on Chamuel's official YouTube channel on January 9, 2015. In an interview with She Magazine, Chamuel singled out "Golden" as the song that she always wanted to write.

== Release and promotion ==
The album was released through Brooklyn-based The End Records. Chamuel showcased the album's music during her Turn It Up tour in late 2014. The seventeen city U.S. tour included Seattle, Los Angeles, Houston, Atlanta and Washington, D.C. In interviews leading to the album's release Chamuel described her songwriting process, as well as her learning process on The Voice. She said the show taught her to remove the barriers between her as a performer and the audience and acknowledged Usher's contribution in making her see the entirety of a performance. She called the pop focus in this album a continuation of that. She said her goal is to make music "that people can resonate with" and "feel at home", and in an interview with Michigan Radio she added she wants the listener "to process their own stories through the lyrics." On March 4, 2015, Chamuel performed "Face the Fire" on CTV's Canada AM morning show. On March 17, she performed "Golden" on VH1's Big Morning Buzz Live show.

== Reception ==
Professional ratings
Review scores
Source	Rating
AllMusic	3.5/5 stars

David Jeffries of AllMusic had a positive view. He noted the music has "a pop edge that's post-mashup, post-Internet, and maybe even post-genre" and called the album "a thoughtful gift" for Chamuel's Voice fans, and added her producer persona remains tamed in the background. Jeffries called the singing "powerful" and the songwriting "sincere". In an article for Digital Trends, Mike Mettler characterized the music as a "fusing [of] dancestyle pop with elements of rock, jazz, electronic, soul, and punk." He noted a melodic house influence in "Weight of the World" and a reggae influence in "Money". In describing the musical style, New University's Sana Aljilani wrote the album "draws inspiration from music [of] the late 1990s and early 2000s, yet Chamuel manages to put a modern twist on the album."

== Track listing ==
No.	Title	Length
1.	"Face the Fire"	3:17
2.	"The Fall"	3:36
3.	"Golden"	3:38
4.	"Made for Me"	3:41
5.	"Lottery"	3:38
6.	"Weight of the World"	3:54
7.	"Rock It"	3:06
8.	"Wake Up"	4:22
9.	"Money"	3:17
10.	"Give You"	3:40

== Personnel ==
Credits adapted from AllMusic and Bandcamp.

- Michelle Chamuel – primary artist, composer, producer, engineer, executive producer, vocals, background vocals, vocal producer, additional keyboards/programming, design
- Tyler Duncan – composer, producer, head engineer, sound design, keyboards, programming, background vocals/guitar/percussion, mixing
- Theo Katzman – composer, producer, engineer, drums, guitar, bass, percussion, background vocals
- Devin Kerr – mastering, mixing
- Andrew C. Taylor – photography
- Robert Lux – graphic design
- Tom Stoepker – additional composition (track 9)
- Tomek Miernowski – additional composition (track 9)
- Background vocals – Mike Shea, Julian Allen, Joe Dart, Jack Stratton, Woody Goss

== Charts ==
Chart (2015)	Peak position
US Independent Albums (Billboard)	21

== Release history ==
Country	Date	Label	Format	Ref.
United States	February 10, 2015	The End Records	Vinyl; CD; download	
Canada	February 10, 2015	The End Records	Vinyl; CD; download	
United Kingdom	February 10, 2015	The End Records	Vinyl; CD; download	
Germany	February 10, 2015	The End Records	Vinyl; CD; download	
Worldwide	February 10, 2015	The End Records	Digital download	
