= Somni (album) =

Live album by Snarky Puppy
- Released: November 21, 2025
- Venues: Utrecht, The Netherlands
- Studio: Kabul à GoGo
- Genres: jazz fusion; orchestral jazz
- Length: 1:11:30
- Label: GroundUP Records

Somni is the 15th full-length studio album of American jazz fusion group Snarky Puppy, released on November 21, 2025, by GroundUP Records. The album was performed and recorded live in front of a studio audience in Utrecht, The Netherlands, across six sessions from January 17 to 19, 2025. The album marks the second time the band collaborated with Dutch jazz-pop orchestra Metropole Orkest under the direction of conductor Jules Buckley, following their first collaboration in 2015 with the creation of Sylva. The primary driving compositional force behind the album was the concept of dreams, specifically their multifaceted and mysterious nature. The title, "Somni," translates to "sleep" or "dream" in Catalan.

Michael League, the group's leader and bassist, spent a month fully isolated within the Japanese countryside (Oita and Hida-Takayama) purely dedicating the time to composing. His goal with writing was to explore the many diverse aspects within dreams, including their "confusion, fear, and strangeness."

== Music ==
Each of the album's eight songs embody different depictions and aspects of dreams, traversing through phases of sleep, shifting identities, the loose logical progression of dreams, and the emotional afterimage felt after waking from a particularly vivid dream.

=== Waves Upon Waves ===
The track's swelling, cascading, and repeating melodies, in addition to evoking a certain dreamlike quality, as noted by League, never surrenders to neither full wakefulness nor sleep, existing somewhere in between the two. In addition to the term "waves" being used to describe the consistent building and receding "waves" of sound, it may also refer to brainwaves at different stages of sleep.

Soloists (in order of appearance):

- Bob Reynolds — tenor saxophone
- Jay Jennings — flugelhorn
- Chris Bullock — flute
- Mike "Maz" Maher — flugelhorn
- Zach Brock — violin

=== As You Are But Not As You Were ===
"As You Are But Not As You Were" explores the concept of recognizing a familiar figure within a dream while their likeness gradually shifts into being almost completely unrecognizable. League describes the changes in shape to the central musical phrase (played first by the marimbas) as "knowing that a person in your dream is your mother, but their face looks like Bill Clinton or something."

Soloists (in order of appearance):

- Justin Stanton — Rhodes MK8
- Robinson Khoury — trombone
- Mike "Maz" Maher — flugelhorn

=== Chimera ===
"Chimera" represents a subconscious left unattended and unguided. League explains that the song exists "in between a nightmare and a dream where you observe yourself doing things you're too shy or reserved to do in real life." The piece immediately reflects this uneasiness with an opening of smeary, blaring brass, heavily contrasting the openings of the previous tracks.

Further, the term "chimera," which classically refers to a monstrous quadruped with parts of various animals (like the head of a lion and the tail of a serpent), while extending to the song's brooding and unstable sound, most prominently describes the final segment, in which the instrumentalists are split into four groups, each playing in different key signatures and tempos simultaneously, creating a cacophony of intertwining melodies. League says this four-part split was the "hardest thing we did on the whole record."

Soloists (in order of appearance):

- Bob Lanzetti — electric guitar
- Bobby Sparks II — clavinet

=== Between Worlds ===
Described by League as a "lullaby," the piece depicts the transition from wakefulness into sleep, or a "transition from the world that we all know... into this kind of other world." The song begins and mostly operates in a 3/4 time signature, then shifts to 5/4 during the chorus, giving it a sort of rhythmic unevenness intended to express the imbalance between two contrasting states of consciousness.

Soloist:

- Bob Reynolds — soprano saxophone

=== Recurrent ===
The concept for "Recurrent" mostly stems from a fever dream League had as a young child. He distinctly remembers running through a vast field as massive metal gears stampeded directly behind him, with the dream ending moments before he was crushed. The track is defined by a repeating rhythmic figure, alluding to League's experience with the dream: "There would be a moment where I would feel like everything was cool... and then they [the gears] would appear again."

The title also suggests a reference to the phenomenon of recurring dreams which, in addition to often revolving around some sort of chase or pursuit, are defined by their repetition, which is mirrored in the song.

Soloists (in order of appearance):

- Bill Laurance — piano
- Jay Jennings — flugelhorn
- Bob Reynolds — tenor saxophone
- Larnell Lewis — drumset
- Nikki Glaspie — drumset
- Jason "JT" Thomas — drumset
- Jamison Ross — drumset

=== Drift ===
A noticeably slower and deliberate track compared to the others, "Drift" describes the period of total sleep immersion, or deep sleep. League explains the feeling as "really being carried off into this other bizarre world."

Soloist:

- Bobby Sparks II — Hammond B3 organ

=== Only Here and Nowhere Else ===
"Only Here and Nowhere Else" seeks to evoke the feeling of disorientation immediately after waking from a dream, particularly one with such great vividity that it's perceived as real, albeit temporarily. The title is a descriptor of the dream state as a whole: a reality that only exists in one place. League comments, "it took about 10 seconds of being conscious to recognize that my real reality is different than the last eight hours."

Soloist:

- Mark Lettieri — electric guitar

=== It Stays With You ===
The final track of the album captures the lingering emotional impact following a dream. In this case, "it" refers to both the dream itself and whatever new thoughts, beliefs, or impressions were influenced or spurred by the dream. League describes this feeling: "Sometimes the dream that I have -- by mid-afternoon, it's still kind of on me in a certain way."

Soloists (in order of appearance):

- Chris Bullock — tenor saxophone
- Chris McQueen — electric guitar

== Track listing ==
Adapted from Snarky Puppy's official Somni webpage.

"Somni" track listing
No.	Title	Writer(s)	Arranger	Length
1.	"Waves Upon Waves"	Michael League	Jules Buckley; Michael League; Jochen Neuffer	7:39
2.	"As You Are But Not As You Were"	League	Buckley; League	10:08
3.	"Chimera"	League	Buckley; Sam Gale; League	8:14
4.	"Between Worlds"	League	Buckley; League; Neuffer	8:08
5.	"Recurrent"	League	Buckley; League; Neuffer	13:52
6.	"Drift"	League	Buckley; Gale; League	5:53
7.	"Only Here and Nowhere Else"	League	Buckley; League	6:44
8.	"It Stays WIth You"	League	Buckley; League	10:52
Total length:				1:11:30

== Personnel ==
Adapted from descriptions of the official GroundUP YouTube videos of the album's live performance. Numbers in parentheses () denote an instrument only being used for the specific track.

Snarky Puppy

- Michael League — electric bass, Minimoog, sazbüş (4)
- Bill Laurance — piano, Mellotron, Wurlitzer, synthesizers
- Bobby Sparks II — Hammond B3 organ, clavinet, Minimoog Model D
- Justin Stanton — Rhodes MK8, Minimoog Model D, piano, synthesizers, trumpet
- Bob Lanzetti — electric guitar
- Chris McQueen — electric guitar
- Mark Lettieri — electric guitar
- Jamison Ross — drumset, vocals (1)
- Jason "JT" Thomas — drumset, vocals (1)
- Larnell Lewis — drumset, vocals (1)
- Nikki Glaspie — drumset, vocals (1)
- Keita Ogawa — percussion
- Marcelo Woloski — percussion
- Nate Werth — percussion
- Mason Davis — percussion, marimbas, krakeb
- Zach Brock — violin
- Jay Jennings — flugelhorn, trumpet, keyboard (2)
- Mike "Maz" Maher — flugelhorn, trumpet
- Bob Reynolds — tenor saxophone, soprano saxophone (4)
- Chris Bullock — tenor saxophone, flute

Metropole Orkest

- Raquel Marin Garcés, Sarah Koh, Vera Laporeva, Linda Lukas, Gideon Nelissen, Annerieke Nentjes, David Peijnenborgh, Jasper van Rosmalen, Pauline Terlouw — 1st violin
- Róbert Bába, Valentine Blangé, Michelle Brunt, Merel Jonker, Maartje Kraan, Ruben Margarita, Herman van Haaren, Ewa Zbyszynska — 2nd violin
- María Ángeles Chaparro Fuentes, Norman Jansen, Julia Jowett, Rani Kumar, Isabella Petersen, Iris Schut — viola
- Jascha Albracht, Joel Siepmann, Annie Tångberg, Emile Visser — cello
- Benjamin de Boer, Dobril Popdimitrov, Erik Winkelmann — contrabass
- Janine Abbas, Maria Cristina González Perez, Mariël van den Bos — flute
- Maxime Le Minter, Marc Scholten — english horn, oboe
- Paul van der Feen — 1st alto saxophone, clarinet
- Leo Janssen — 2nd alto saxophone, clarinet
- Sjoerd Dijkhuizen — 1st tenor saxophone, clarinet
- David Kweksilber — 2nd tenor saxophone, bass clarinet
- Hugo Freitas, Pieter Hungeld, Elisabeth Otra Sangenaro — baritone saxophone, bass clarinet, contrabass clarinet, horn
- Ray Bruinsma, Nico Schepers, Koen Smits — trumpet
- Jan Bastiani, Peter Delannoye, Robinson Khoury — trombone
- Martin van den Berg — bass trombone
- Ries Schellekens — tuba
- Murk Jisoot, Frank Wardenier — percussion
- Sanne Bakker — harp

Additional technical personnel

- Nic Hard — chief recording engineer, audio engineer, mixer
- Ryan Haft, Michael Harrison, Dirk Overeem — audio engineer
- Ananya Sharma — recording & mixing assistant
- Dave McNair — audio masterer
