= Empire Central =

Studio album by Snarky Puppy
- Released: September 30, 2022
- Recorded: March 3–10, 2022
- Studio: Deep Ellum Art Company (Dallas, Texas)
- Length: 94:28
- Label: GroundUP

Snarky Puppy chronology
Live at GroundUP Music Festival (2022)	Empire Central (2022)

Singles from Empire Central
- 1. "Trinity" Released: June 10, 2022; 2. "Bet" Released: July 29, 2022; 3. "Belmont" Released: September 9, 2022

Empire Central is the fifteenth album and seventh live album by American band Snarky Puppy. Released on September 30, 2022, on GroundUP Music, it won Best Contemporary Instrumental Album at the 65th Grammy Awards.

== Background and recording ==
Empire Central was recorded live in front of a studio audience over the course of eight days at Deep Ellum Art Company, a converted venue space in Dallas, Texas. The album is an homage to Dallas's rich history of black music. Despite Snarky Puppy originating at University of North Texas in Denton, 30 miles away from Dallas, bandleader Michael League cited Dallas's gospel and R&B scene as what solidified the band's distinct sound. League named Dallas-based musicians Erykah Badu, RC Williams, Roy Hargrove (who partially inspired the track name "Cliroy"), Kirk Franklin, and Jason Moran as influences for the album.

Tracks on the album that allude to Dallas and Texas include "RL's", referring to South Dallas nightclub R.L.'s Blues Palace #2, "Mean Green", named after the North Texas mascot, "Belmont", named for the street in Dallas where League lived, "Fuel City", named for a Texas gas station chain, and "Trinity", named for Texas's Trinity River.

The album features the last recorded performance of funk keyboardist Bernard Wright, who died in a car accident less than two months after the recording sessions. Appearing on the track "Take It!", Wright was described by League as Snarky Puppy's musical "godfather", having mentored many of the band's members and joining the band himself from 2007 to 2010.

Empire Central also marks Snarky Puppy's last album with keyboardist Shaun Martin before his death in August 2024.

Before the album's release in 2022, Snarky Puppy previewed several tracks while on tour with Steely Dan. League credits Steely Dan as one of Snarky Puppy's largest influences, describing touring with them as "a dream".

== Composition ==
Empire Central draws influence from a variety of genres, including jazz, funk, blues, R&B, gospel, and hard rock. Contrary to the band's previous albums, on which League provided most of the writing, Empire Central features original compositions by 12 different band members.

== Critical reception ==
Professional ratings
Aggregate scores
Source	Rating
Metacritic	75/100
Review scores
Source	Rating
AllMusic	4.5/5 stars
Jazzwise	4/5 stars
PopMatters	6/10
The Telegraph	4/5 stars
Uncut	7/10

Empire Central was met with largely positive reviews. At Metacritic, the album received an aggregate score of 75 based on 6 reviews, indicating "generally favorable reviews".

AllMusic's Matt Collar called Empire Central "one of Snarky Puppy's most enjoyable and accessible albums to date," writing that it showcases "the group's longstanding knack for crafting groove-based instrumental tracks rife with hooky melodies, sophisticated arrangements, and exploratory improvisations." He assigned the album an AllMusic Album Pick. In a positive review for Jazzwise, reviewer Hugh Morris called the album "a funkier, heavier, and noticeably slower-paced collection," and "a welcome return of the atmospheric, half-live recording so perfectly pitched on We Like It Here and the Family Dinner volumes". Tina Edwards of The Telegraph praised the album's diverse global influences and old-fashioned sensibilities, calling it "as unclassifiable as it is virtuosic", while also noting it "feels like a collection of singles rather than a chronological record." In a mixed review for JazzTimes, writer Morgan Enos called the music of Empire Central "rock-solid", while at the same time lacking "a certain je ne sais quoi" compared to Snarky Puppy's other albums.

== Track listing ==
Writer credits adapted from Glide Magazine and GroundUP Music.

No.	Title	Writer(s)	Length
1.	"Keep It On Your Mind"	Michael League	5:30
2.	"East Bay"	Chris Bullock	5:11
3.	"Bet"	League	5:33
4.	"Cliroy"	Jay Jennings	4:45
5.	"Take It!" (feat. Bernard Wright)	Bobby Sparks	6:39
6.	"Portal"	Marcelo Woloski	5:12
7.	"Broken Arrow"	Justin Stanton	7:19
8.	"RL's"	League	9:22
9.	"Mean Green"	Nate Werth	4:54
10.	"Fuel City"	Bill Laurance	4:52
11.	"Free Fall"	Stanton	3:50
12.	"Belmont"	League	6:29
13.	"Pineapple"	Mike Maher, League	4:56
14.	"Honiara"	Zach Brock, League, Maher	6:50
15.	"Coney Bear"	Bob Lanzetti	5:16
16.	"Trinity"	Mark Lettieri	7:54
Total length:			94:28

== Personnel ==
Adapted from Snarky Puppy on YouTube.

- Michael League – electric bass (2 – 10, 12 – 16), Minimoog Model D bass (1, 11)
- Bob Lanzetti – electric guitar
- Mark Lettieri – electric guitar, baritone guitar (1)
- Chris McQueen – electric guitar
- Justin Stanton – Wurlitzer/Prophet 10/Minimoog Model D (1, 2, 4, 8 – 10, 12, 14 – 16), trumpet (1, 4, 7, 8, 16), Fender Rhodes Mark 8 (3, 11, 13), Yamaha CP70 (5, 6, 11, 13)
- Bobby Sparks – Hammond B3 organ, ARP String Ensemble, Minimoog Model D, Hohner D6 Clavinet (all tracks)
- Shaun Martin – talkbox, vocoder, Moog Little Phatty, Korg Kronos, Mellotron (2 – 5, 7, 9 – 16), Fender Rhodes Mark 8 (1, 6), Hammond B3 organ (8)
- Bill Laurance – Fender Rhodes Mark 8/Yamaha CP70/Minimoog Model D (2 – 5, 7 – 10, 12, 14 – 16), Mellotron (6), Prophet 10 (11), Hohner D6 Clavinet (1, 13), Expressive Osmose (15)
- Bernard Wright – Wurlitzer/Prophet 10/Minimoog Model D (6)
- Zach Brock – violin
- Mike "Maz" Maher – trumpet, flugelhorn
- Jay Jennings – trumpet, flugelhorn
- Chris Bullock – tenor saxophone, bass clarinet (4, 10, 16), flute, piccolo (3), soprano saxophone (6)
- Bob Reynolds – tenor saxophone, soprano saxophone
- Nate Werth – percussion
- Keita Ogawa – percussion
- Marcelo Woloski – percussion
- Jason "JT" Thomas – drum set
- Larnell Lewis – drum set, finger cymbals (4)
- Jamison Ross – drum set
