= Robert Searight =

American musician

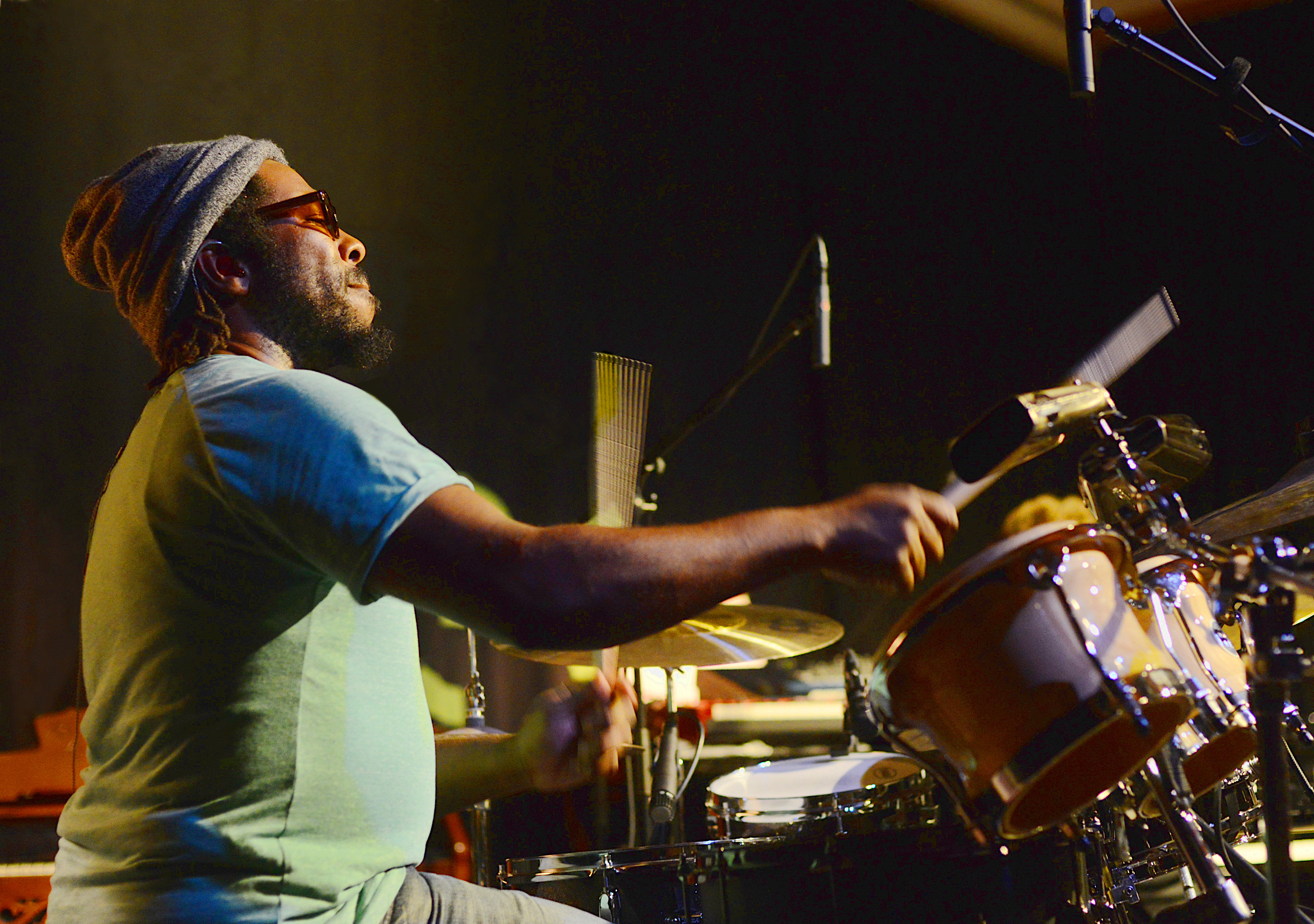
- Searight in 2015

Background information
- Also known as: Robert Searight II
- Born: March 18, 1975 (age 51); Dallas, Texas, United States
- Origin: Dallas
- Genres: Jazz; fusion; R&B; gospel; funk; rock; pop
- Occupations: Musician; composer; producer
- Instruments: Drums, piano, keyboards
- Years active: c. 1996–present
- Label: Independent
- Member of: Snarky Puppy; Ghost-Note
- Formerly of: Toto

Robert "Sput" Searight (born March 18, 1975) is an American drummer, composer and producer best known for his work with jazz fusion band Snarky Puppy and as co-founder of the percussion-based band Ghost-Note. His background spans several genres including jazz, funk, hip-hop and gospel. He has toured and recorded with a variety of artists including Kirk Franklin, Snoop Dogg, Justin Timberlake, Erykah Badu and Toto. He has received a Grammy Award for his production work on the album God's Property.

== Life and career ==
Searight was born and raised in Dallas, Texas. He grew up in a musical family with a variety of instruments in his childhood home. His mother, Linda Searight, was an operatic singer and music teacher. He received his first drum kit at the age of five and started playing drums. He grew up listening to gospel music exclusively, but that changed at age eight with access to a diverse library of vinyl albums. He started taking music lessons in junior high school and, later, attended Booker T. Washington High School for the Performing Arts, where he played piano and received his first exposure to improvisation in the arts. He names gospel drummer Joel Smith as his biggest early influence.

In 1992, while in high school, Searight and his mother Linda founded the gospel choir God's Property. He studied jazz-piano and drums in junior college and then attended University of North Texas and majored in percussion. Soon after, in 1997, God's Property and Kirk Franklin collaborated to produce the eponymous album God's Property, for which Searight won a Grammy award in the category Best Gospel Choir or Chorus Album. He started touring extensively in support of the album and settled in Los Angeles. There, he worked as a drummer and producer with a variety of artists, including Snoop Dogg, Justin Timberlake, Kendrick Lamar and Timbaland.

In mid-2000s Searight moved back to Dallas and performed in the Dallas R&B-gospel music scene, working with Erykah Badu, Tamela Mann, The Clark Sisters and others. In weekly jam sessions he met members of the jazz fusion band Snarky Puppy, at the time a Dallas-based band. Around 2006, he joined Snarky Puppy, first as a keyboardist and then as a drummer. He has received three Grammys with the ensemble. (Note: Searight is credited for Grammy Awards for the song "Something" and albums Sylva and Culcha Vulcha.) In 2014, Searight and Snarky Puppy percussionist Nate Werth founded Ghost-Note, a percussion-based funk-hip hop-jazz band. He has released three albums with Ghost-Note, Fortified in 2015, Swagism in 2018, and Mustard n' Onions in 2024. From 2020 to 2023, he joined Toto as the band's drummer and toured with the band.

== Discography ==
God's Property

- God's Property from Kirk Franklin's Nu Nation (1997)

Ghost-Note

- Fortified (2015)
- Swagism (2018)
- Mustard n' Onions (2024)

With Snarky Puppy

- Bring Us the Bright (2008)
- Tell Your Friends (2010)
- GroundUP (2012)
- Family Dinner – Volume 1 (2013)
- Sylva with Metropole Orkest (2015)
- Family Dinner – Volume 2 (2016)
- Culcha Vulcha (2016)

With Toto

- With a Little Help from My Friends (2021)

With others

- Live in Concert (2001) with Kim Burrell
- Dorinda Clark Cole (2002) with Dorinda Clark-Cole
- Out the Box (2004) with Tonéx
- Live from Forest Hills (2026) with Jon Bellion

Session and production credits selected works

| Artist | Album |
|---|---|
| Kirk Franklin | The Flight of My Life (2007); Hello Fear (2011); Losing My Religion (2015) |
| Kendrick Lamar | To Pimp a Butterfly (2015) |
| Shaun Martin | 7 Summers (2015); Focus (2018) |
| Bill Laurance | Aftersun (2016) |
| Terrace Martin | Velvet Portraits (2016); Drones (2021) |
| Kamasi Washington | Heaven & Earth (2018) |
| Myron Butler & Levi | Set Me Free (2005); Stronger (2007); Revealed (2010) |
| Tamela Mann | Gotta Keep Movin (2005); The Live Experience (2007); The Master Plan (2009); Best Days (2012) |
| Marvin Sapp | You Shall Live (2015); Close (2017) |
| Ted Winn | Stand in Awe (2017) |
