= Zach Brock =

American jazz violinist and composer (b. 1974)

- Born: August 2, 1974 (age 52); Lexington, Kentucky, U.S.
- Genres: Jazz, Fusion, Jazz-Rock, Americana, Classical
- Occupations: Musician, composer, arranger, teacher
- Instruments: Violin, 5-String Violin, Fadolin
- Labels: Secret Fort, Criss Cross, Ropeadope, GroundUp, Dot Time, Minsi Ridge, Universal
- Website: zachbrock.com

Zach Brock (born August 2, 1974, in Lexington) is an American jazz violinist and composer. He has been a member of Snarky Puppy since 2007 and has worked with Stanley Clarke, Phil Markowitz, and Dave Liebman, as well as leading his own groups.

== Early life ==
Brock was born and raised in Lexington, Kentucky. His parents, Dan and Jenny Brock, were active in the local music scene and met as members of the Lexington Singers. His education began early with Montessori School, and he started learning violin through the Suzuki method. He graduated from Bryan Station High School in 1992 before attending Northwestern University’s Bienen School of Music where he majored in Violin Performance as pupil of Dr. Myron Kartman. At Northwestern he met Erin Harper who later became his wife and the mother of their twin daughters.

As stated in the title of one of his albums, Brock's musical career, "Almost Never Was." During his sophomore year at Northwestern, while bicycling through a busy intersection, he was struck by a hit-and-run driver. Bystanders rushed to prevent him being hit again, since he was unable to stand or walk. He suffered compound-complex fractures of the femur, fibula, and tibia of his left leg, with the patella shattered into eight pieces. More than three years of surgeries and rehabilitation from the accident set back his formal studies. However, while Northwestern did not then offer a course of study for jazz violin, Brock was allowed to audit jazz classes while completing his degree. Despite the delay, he graduated in 1999.

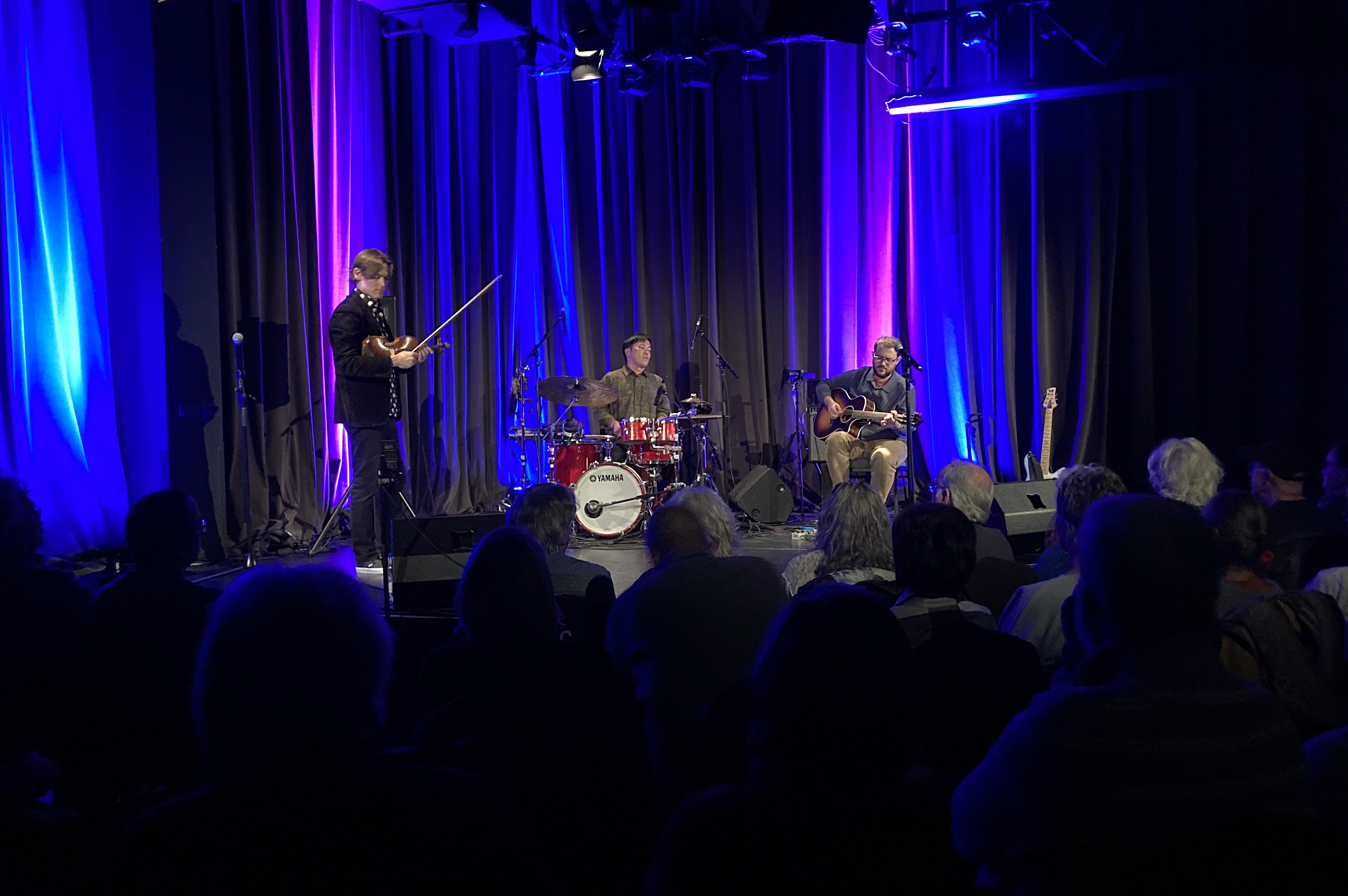
Zach Brock (left) with his trio “Brock – Lanzetti – Ogawa” performing live on November 7, 2025, at the Palais Montcalm concert hall in Quebec City, Canada: Zach Brock (4- and 6-string violin), Keita Ogawa (drums and percussion), Bob Lanzetti (acoustic and electric guitar).

== Career ==
Brock began performing professionally and recording while still a student at Northwestern, His first recordings were with the band Spazztet which also featured guitarist Aaron Weistrop. The band's first album Beautiful Impatience was later reissued under Spazztet and Weistrop's name and their second album Silent Films was released as Spazztet. For several years after the turn of the century, Brock led and recorded with his quartet, Zach Brock and the Coffee Achievers, releasing three albums between 2003 and 2007.

Around 2008 Brock became a member of two different bands with which he continues to be associated. He has recorded with Matt Ulery's Loom based in Chicago on seven albums. He was on three albums with Snarky Puppy, then working in and from Dallas and on the verge of international stardom. He departed Snarky Puppy in 2011 for other projects, including touring with Stanley Clarke, but he returned to the band in 2016 and continues to be one of now Brooklyn-based band's most frequent performers, including on two of the band's Grammy Award winning albums.

In addition to his other activities, Brock was a Boyer Artist-in-Residence at Temple University in Philadelphia and remains as an adjunct faculty member at The New School in New York City. Additionally, in early 2026, Brock joined the Oberlin Conservatory faculty as an Associate Professor of Multi-Genre Performance and Improvisation, while also making the world premiere of his orchestral suite "What Remains" with the Lexington Chamber Orchestra, venue in the Centenary Church on May 9, 2026.

== Awards and honours ==
- 2002 Betty Carter Jazz Ahead Participant
- 2005 Dave Douglas Jazz Workshop in Performance Participant, Carnegie Hall
- 2013 Rising Star Violinist by DownBeat Magazine
- 2016 Grammy Award with Snarky Puppy, Culcha Vulcha, Best Contemporary Instrumental Album
- 2021 Grammy Award with Snarky Puppy, Live at the Royal Albert Hall, Best Contemporary Instrumental Album
- 2022 Nominated “Best Contemporary Instrumental Album” Grammy Awards for Dirty Mindz
- 2023 Grammy Award with Snarky Puppy, Empire Central, Best Contemporary Instrumental Album

== Discography ==
=== As leader ===
- Silent Films (Secret Fort, 2000)
- Zach Brock and the Coffee Achievers (Secret Fort, 2003)
- Chemistry (Secret Fort, 2005)
- Live at the Jazz Factory (Secret Fort, 2007)
- The Magic Number (Secret Fort, 2010)
- Almost Never Was (Criss Cross, 2012)
- Purple Sounds (Criss Cross, 2014)
- Serendipity (Criss Cross, 2015)
- Light Shines Through (Secret Fort, 2021)
- Polyphony (Secret Fort, 2021)
- Dirty Mindz (GroundUP, 2022)

==== With Trio "Brock – Lanzetti – Ogawa" ====
- Album - Drawing Songs (GroundUp Music, released November 10, 2023)
- Singles - Drawing Song (2023) and Moro Morocco (2023)

With Snarky Puppy

- Bring Us the Bright (Sitmom, 2008)
- Tell Your Friends (Ropeadope, 2010)
- GroundUP (Ropeadope/GroundUP, 2012)
- Culcha Vulcha (GroundUP, 2016)
- Immigrance (GroundUP, 2019)
- Live at the Royal Albert Hall'(GroundUP, 2020)
- Empire Central (GroundUP, 2022)
- Somni (with Metropole Orkest) (GroundUP, 2025)

With Eric Doney

- As If By Magic (Minsi Ridge, 2013)

With Phil Markowitz

- Perpetuity (Dot Time, 2014)

With Triptych (Zach Brock, Matt Ulery, Jon Dietemyer)

- Wonderment (Woolgathering, 2019)

With Matt Ulery

- Music Box Ballerina (Woolgathering, 2008)
- By A Little Light (Greenleaf, 2012)
- In The Ivory (Greenleaf, 2014)
- Themes & Scenes (Woolgathering, 2009)
- Festival (Woolgathering, 2016)
- Delicate Charms (Woolgathering, 2019)
- Become Giant (Woolgathering, 2022)

=== As sideman ===
- Grazyna Auguscik, Live Sounds Live (GMA, 2007)
- Buck 65, Secret House Against the World (WEA, 2005)
- Wycliffe Gordon, The Intimate Ellington (Criss Cross, 2013)
- Glenn Kaiser, Throw Down Your Crowns (Grrr, 1997)
- Mahavishnu Project, Return to the Emerald Beyond (Cuneiform, 2007)
- Phil Markowitz, Perpetuity (Dot Time, 2014)
- Angus & Julia Stone, A Book Like This (Capitol, 2007)
- Frank Vignola, Melody Magic (Azica, 2013)
- Bill Laurance, Flint (GroundUP, 2014)
- Premik Russell Tubbs & Margee Minier-Tubbs, 'Oneness-World' (Margetoile Records, 2025)
- Premik Russell Tubbs & Margee Minier-Tubbs, In The Stillness Of The Stars (Margetoile Records, 2026)
