= GroundUP =

GroundUp may refer to the following:

- Ground Up, an Australian comedy television series
- GroundUp (news agency), a South African non-profit online news outlet
- GroundUP (album), by American jazz band Snarky Puppy
- GroundUPmusic, a label started by Snarky Puppy
