= Culcha Vulcha =

Studio album by Snarky Puppy
- Released: April 29, 2016
- Studios: Sonic Ranch, Atlantic Sound
- Genre: Jazz fusion
- Length: 65:43
- Label: GroundUP
- Producers: Michael League, Snarky Puppy

Snarky Puppy chronology
| Family Dinner – Volume 2 (2016) | Culcha Vulcha (2016) | Immigrance (2019) |

Culcha Vulcha is an album by American jazz fusion group Snarky Puppy that was released on April 29, 2016. The album includes performances by a number of musicians associated with the band and called "the Fam". The band's first studio album in eight years since Bring Us the Bright, it was recorded at the Sonic Ranch in Tornillo, Texas near El Paso and Atlantic Sound Studios in Brooklyn, New York, by Nic Hard.

== Reception ==
Culcha Vulcha received moderate praise upon release, with NPR extolling the "core sonic idea [of Culcha Vulcha], it's an intricate melody over a multifaceted groove...It gathers ideas openly and avidly from all over the world". John Fordham of The Guardian remarked that "Jazzers might still balk at the high-concept planning, but it's remarkable how much polish has been applied without cramping the band's irrepressible creative energy."

Culcha Vulcha also received the Grammy Award for Best Contemporary Instrumental Album in 2016. In a release on social media, the band offered thanks, saying, "It's the first time that we've been awarded a Grammy for an album that represents who we are (99 percent) of the time—just us, without special guests, playing our own music."

== Track listing ==
Source+

| No. | Title | Length |
|---|---|---|
| 1. | "Tarova" (Michael League) | 3:40 |
| 2. | "Semente" (Michael League) | 7:12 |
| 3. | "Gemini" (Justin Stanton) | 5:16 |
| 4. | "Grown Folks" (Michael League) | 7:58 |
| 5. | "Beep Box" (Chris Bullock) | 4:02 |
| 6. | "GØ" (Michael League) | 8:54 |
| 7. | "The Simple Life" (Bob Lanzetti) | 4:02 |
| 8. | "Palermo" (Marcelo Woloski) | 6:38 |
| 9. | "Big Ugly" (Michael League) | 9:10 |
| 10. | "Jefe" (Mark Lettieri, bonus) | 8:51 |

== Personnel ==
Source+

- Michael League – electric bass guitar, Moog Sub Phatty, nylon-string guitar, Mellotron, acoustic bass, Moog bass, piccolo bass, ukulele bass, baritone guitar, handclaps
- Bob Lanzetti – electric & acoustic guitars
- Mark Lettieri – electric & acoustic guitars, baritone guitar, Hammertone guitar
- Chris McQueen – electric & acoustic guitars
- Zach Brock – violin
- Cory Henry – clavinet, organ, Mellotron, Omni, Moog, piano
- Bill Laurance – Fender Rhodes, piano, Synthex, Moog bass, clavinet
- Shaun Martin – vocoder & talkbox
- Bobby Sparks – clavinet, Minimoog, Moog bass
- Justin Stanton – piano, Fender Rhodes, Omni, Prophet 6, Moog, Synthex. Arp Axxe
- Jay Jennings – trumpet, flugelhorn
- Mike 'Maz' Maher – trumpet, flugelhorn, vocals
- Chris Bullock – tenor saxophone, bass clarinet, flute, alto flute, keyboards
- Bob Reynolds – tenor saxophone
- Larnell Lewis – drum set
- Robert "Sput" Searight – drum set
- Jason 'J.T.' Thomas – drum set
- Keita Ogawa – percussion: timbal, repenque, kanjira, caixa, congas, talking drum, kalimbas, handclaps
- Nate Werth – percussion: trap set, floor tom, cowbells, chimes, caixa, tambourine, congas, shaker, angklung, handclaps
- Marcelo Woloski – percussion: djembe, shakers, surdo, triangle, caixa, angklung, tang-tang, reco-cowbell, daf, bombo legüero, donkey jaw, kalimba, effects, handclaps

== Charts ==
| Chart (2016) | Peak position |
|---|---|
| Belgian Albums (Ultratop Flanders) | 184 |
| Dutch Albums (Album Top 100) | 69 |
| French Albums (SNEP) | 173 |
| US Billboard 200 | 159 |
