= Shaun Martin =

American composer and musician (1978–2024)

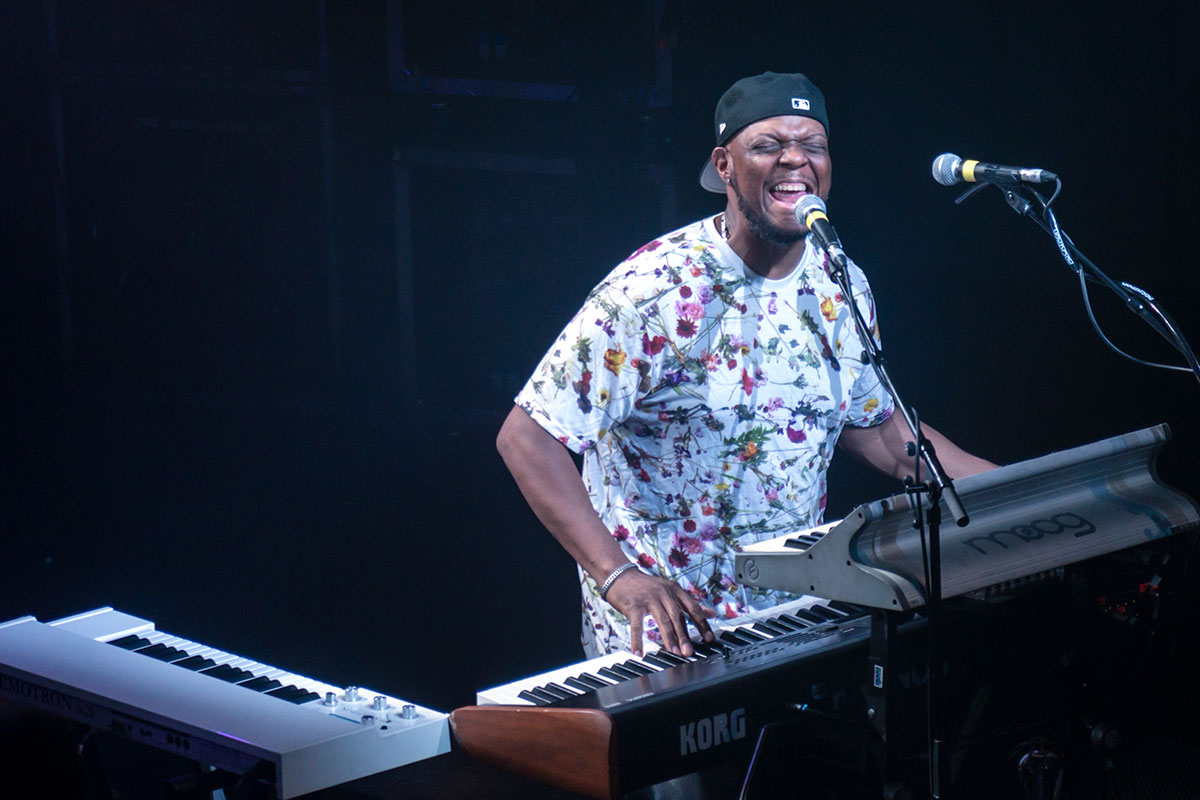
- Martin in 2022

Background information
- Born: August 23, 1978; Dallas, Texas, U.S.
- Died: August 3, 2024 (aged 45)
- Genres: Jazz; jazz fusion; gospel; R&B
- Occupations: Musician, composer, arranger, producer
- Instruments: Piano, Minimoog, clavinet, keyboards, drums
- Labels: Ropeadope, GroundUp
- Formerly of: Snarky Puppy

Harold LaShaun 'Shaun' Martin (August 23, 1978 – August 3, 2024) was an American composer, arranger, record producer, and multi-instrumental musician. Martin was a member of the jazz fusion band Snarky Puppy, as well as music director for Gospel music star Kirk Franklin, and former Minister of Music at Dallas’ Friendship-West Baptist Church. Martin was awarded four Grammys for his work with Franklin and three as a member of Snarky Puppy.

== Biography ==
Shaun Martin was born in Dallas, Texas, on August 23, 1978. His mother started him on piano lessons when he was only four years old, learning classical music and jazz. Through his church, he also learned gospel music. He attended Dallas' Booker T. Washington High School for the Performing and Visual Arts before attending Weatherford College and the University of North Texas. Martin began working with Gospel choir director Kirk Franklin while still in high school. He earned a Bachelor of Applied Arts and Sciences degree from North Texas. While still a student at North Texas, he was involved in the production and recording of Erykah Badu's hit album Mama's Gun.

Martin suffered a stroke in April 2023. He died on August 3, 2024, twenty days shy of his 46th birthday.

== Awards and recognition ==
- 2007 Grammy Award for Best Contemporary R&B Gospel Album as producer on the Kirk Franklin album Hero
- 2009 Grammy Award for Best Contemporary R&B Gospel Album as producer on the Kirk Franklin album The Fight of My Life
- 2012 Grammy Award for Best Gospel Album as producer on the Kirk Franklin album Hello Fear
- 2016 Grammy Award for Best Contemporary Instrumental Album as a member of Snarky Puppy on its album Culcha Vulcha
- 2019 Grammy Award for Best Gospel Album as producer on the Kirk Franklin album Long, Live, Love
- 2021 Grammy Award for Best Contemporary Instrumental Album as a member of Snarky Puppy on its album Live at the Royal Albert Hall
- 2023 Grammy Award for Best Contemporary Instrumental Album as a member of Snarky Puppy on its album Empire Central

== Discography ==
- 7 Summers (Ropeadope, 2015)
- Focus (Ropeadope, 2018)
- Three-O (Ropeadope, 2020)

with Kim Burrell

- Kim Burrell Live in Concert (2004)

with Kirk Franklin

- God's Property (B-Rite Music, 1997)
- The Rebirth of Kirk Franklin (GospoCentric, 2002)
- Hero (Verity, 2005)
- Songs for the Storm, Vol. 1 (GospoCentric, 2006)
- The Fight of My Life (GospoCentric, 2007)
- Hello Fear (GospoCentric, 2011)
- The Essential Kirk Franklin (GospoCentric, 2012)
- Losing My Religion (Fo Yo Soul / RCA, 2015)
- Long, Live, Love (Fo Yo Soul / RCA, 2019)

with Snarky Puppy

- Tell Your Friends (Ropeadope, 2010)
- groundUP (GroundUP, 2012)
- We Like It Here (Ropeadope, 2014)
- Culcha Vulcha (GroundUP, 2016)
- Immigrance (GroundUP, 2019)
- Live at the Royal Albert Hall (GroundUP, 2020)
- Empire Central (GroundUP, 2022)

with Spike Lee & Terence Blanchard

- Get on the Bus Original soundtrack (Interscope Records, 1996)

with Mark Anthony White

- Sacrifice of Praise (J'Maw Music, 1998)

with Erykah Badu

- Mama's Gun (Motown, 2000)

with Guru

- Guru's Jazzmatazz, Vol. 3: Streetsoull (Virgin, 2000)
- The Best of Guru's Jazzmatazz (Virgin, 2008)

with N'Dambi

- Tunin' Up & Cosignin (Cheeky I, 2001)

with Donnie McClurkin

- Again (Verity, 2003)

with Quamon Fowler

- The Vision (Core Instrumental Music, 2005)

with Myron Butler & Levi (composer only)

- Set Me Free (EMI, 2005)
- Stronger (EMI, 2007)
- Double Take/Myron Butler (EMI, 2007)

with Fred Hammond

- Free to Worship (Verity, 2006)
- I Will Trust (RCA Inspiration, 2014)

with Doc Powell

- Doc Powell (Telarc, Heads Up, 2006)

with Tamela Mann

- The Live Experience (Tillymann, 2007)
- The Master Plan (Tillymann, 2009)
- Best Days (Tillymann, 2012)
- One Way (Tillymann, 2016)

with Kristen Mari

- N My Shoes (Ultrax, 2007)

with Dwayne Kerr

- Higher Calling (Dmanns, 2007)

with Anthony Evans

- The Bridge (EMI, 2008)

with Crystal Aikin

- Crystal Aikin (Verity, 2009)

with Various Artists (as Producer)

- The Very Best of Praise & Worship (Verity, 2008)
- Gotta Have Gospel! Ultimate Choirs (GospoCentric / Integrity Music / Verity, 2010)
- Wow Gospel 2012 (Verity, 2012)
- Wow Gospel 2013 (RCA / Verity, 2013)
- Wow Gospel 2014 (RCA / RCA Inspiration, 2014)
- Wow: Gospel 2015: The Year's 30 Top Gospel Artists And Songs (RCA / RCA Inspiration, 2015)

with The Colourphonics

- The Colourphonics (ProgRock Records, 2010)

with T. D. Jakes

- Sacred Love Songs, Vol. 2 (Dexterity Sounds, 2011)

with Amber Bullock

- So in Love (Music World Gospel, 2012)

with James Fortune / James Fortune & FIYA

- Identity (EOne, 2012)
- Dear Future Me (EOne, 2017)
- Dream Again (EOne, 2019)

with Tasha Page-Lockhart

- Here Right Now (Fo Yo Soul / RCA, 2014)

with The Walls Group

- Fast Forward (Fo Yo Soul / RCA, 2014)

with Björk (as tour manager)

- Biophilia Live (One Little Indian, 2014)

with Geoffrey Golden

- Kingdom...Live! (Fo Yo Soul / RCA, 2015)

with Mark Lettieri

- Spark and Echo (Ropeadope, 2016)

with Maz (Mike Maher)

- Idealist (GroundUP, 2016)

with David Crosby

- Sky Trails (BMG, 2017)

with Ledisi

- Let Love Rule (Verve, 2017)

with Larnell Lewis

- In the Moment (Larnell Lewis, 2018)

with Jonathan Scales Fourchestra

- Pillar (Ropeadope, 2018)

with Brian Courtney Wilson

- A Great Work (Motown, 2018)

with Kurt Carr

- Bless Somebody Else (RCA, 2019)
