= Live at the Royal Albert Hall (Snarky Puppy album) =

Live album by Snarky Puppy
- Released: March 6, 2020
- Recorded: November 14, 2019
- Genres: Jazz fusion; funk
- Length: 99:15
- Label: GroundUPmusic
- Producers: Michael League; Snarky Puppy

Snarky Puppy chronology
| Immigrance (2019) | Live at the Royal Albert Hall (2020) | Live at GroundUP Music Festival (2022) |

Live at the Royal Albert Hall is the fourteenth album by the American jazz fusion band Snarky Puppy and the group's first live, in-concert album for general release. (Several previous Snarky Puppy albums had been recorded with an audience present, but those were done with a small audience seated around a studio-like setting.) It was recorded on November 14, 2019, and released on March 6, 2020. The album was released in sets of 2 CDs, 3 LPs, or 2 CDs and 3 LPs. The release won a Grammy Award for the Best Contemporary Instrumental Album at the 63rd Annual Grammy Awards.

== Track listing ==
Disc one
| No. | Title | Length |
|---|---|---|
| 1. | "Even Us" (Michael League) | 8:12 |
| 2. | "Intelligent Design" (Michael League) | 9:17 |
| 3. | "While We're Young" (Mike 'Maz' Maher) | 7:33 |
| 4. | "Alma" (Michael League) | 8:36 |
| 5. | "Bad Kids to the Back" (Justin Stanton) | 8:22 |
| 6. | "Bigly Strictness" (Michael League) | 8:22 |

Disc two
| No. | Title | Length |
|---|---|---|
| 1. | "Tarova" (Michael League) | 6:15 |
| 2. | "Xavi" (Michael League) | 9:32 |
| 3. | "Chonks" (Michael League) | 9:14 |
| 4. | "Sleeper" (Mike 'Maz' Maher) | 11:45 |
| 5. | "Shofukan" (Michael League) | 12:07 |

== Personnel ==
From Live at the Royal Albert Hall liner notes:

- Mark Lettieri – guitar
- Zach Brock – violin
- Bobby Sparks – keyboards
- Bill Laurance – keyboards
- Shaun Martin – keyboards
- Justin Stanton – keyboards, trumpet
- Mike "Maz" Maher – trumpet, flugelhorn
- Chris Bullock – tenor saxophone, flute, alto flute
- Bob Reynolds – tenor saxophone
- Jason "JT" Thomas – drums
- Keita Ogawa – percussion
- Marcelo Woloski – percussion
- Mason Davis – krakebs on "Xavi"
- Michael League – bass guitar, Moog bass, and krakebs
