= Mark Lettieri =

American musician (born c. 1984)

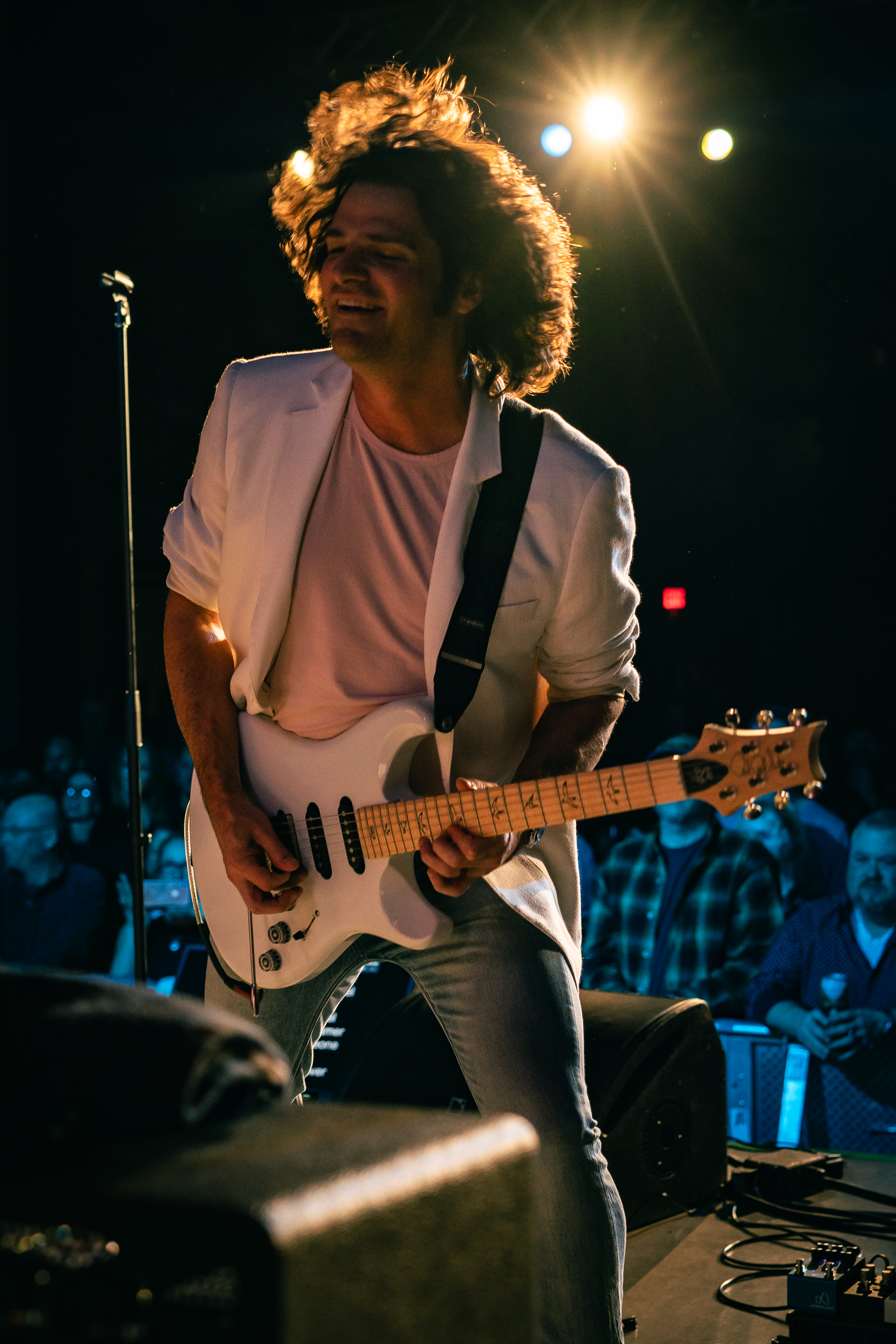

Background information
- Born: c. 1984 (age 41–42); San Francisco Bay Area, California, U.S.
- Origin: Menlo Park, California, U.S.
- Genres: Jazz; jazz fusion; R&B; gospel; funk; rock; pop
- Occupations: Musician; composer; producer
- Instruments: Guitar, Baritone guitar, Bass
- Years active: c. 2007–present
- Labels: GroundUP; Independent
- Member of: Snarky Puppy; The Fearless Flyers
- Website: marklettieri.com

Mark Lettieri (born c. 1984) is an American guitarist, composer and producer. He is a member of the jazz fusion band Snarky Puppy, funk band The Fearless Flyers, and also performs with his quartet, the Mark Lettieri Group. His background spans several genres including jazz, rock and funk. He has released several solo albums. His 2021 album Deep: The Baritone Sessions Vol. 2 was nominated for a Grammy Award for Best Contemporary Instrumental Album.

== Life and career ==
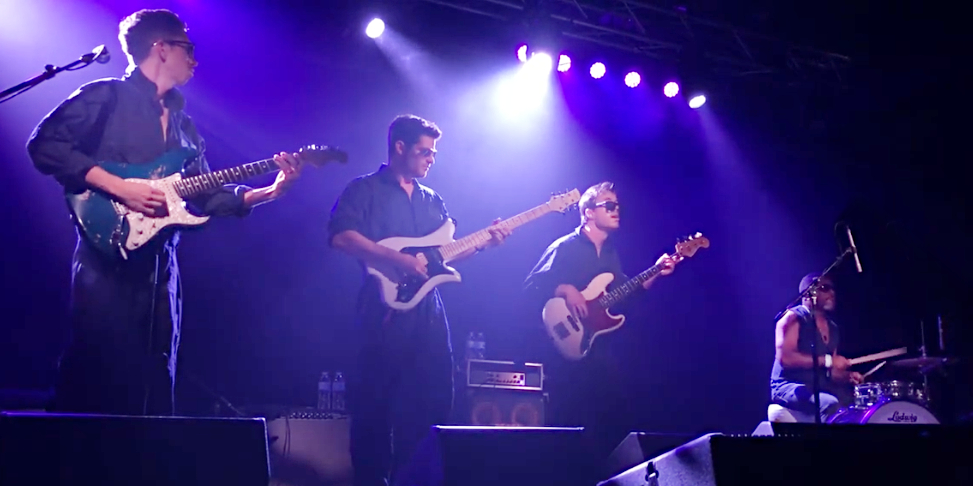
Lettieri (second from left) with The Fearless Flyers

Lettieri was born and raised in the San Francisco Bay Area. At age 12 he began playing guitar. He names Jimi Hendrix and Joe Satriani as early influences for expanding his interest in the instrument. Along with guitar lessons (including jazz guitar), he learned by playing along with recorded music and emulating guitar parts, and playing gigs in various bands. He studied marketing at Texas Christian University in Fort Worth, Texas, and after graduating decided to pursue music professionally. He performed in the Dallas-Fort Worth music scene in clubs, recording sessions, backing bands, and in a variety of genres including R&B, gospel, Christian, country, blues, rock and funk. In regard to starting out as a musician, he said he needed to be versatile and be able to perform in any role and style.

In 2008 he started performing and recording with the jazz fusion band Snarky Puppy, at the time a Dallas-based band whose members along with Lettieri shared the common influence of the Dallas R&B music scene. He is a member of the ensemble and has received five Grammys with the band. (Note: The song "Something" and albums Sylva, Culcha Vulcha, Live at the Royal Albert Hall, Empire Central won Grammy Awards.) He is a founding member of The Fearless Flyers, an instrumental quartet consisting of guitarist Cory Wong, bassist Joe Dart and drummer Nate Smith. Since 2018 the quartet has released four EPs, two studio albums and a live album. He performs and tours with his quartet, the Mark Lettieri Group, consisting of bassist Wes Stephenson, keyboardist Daniel Porter, and drummer Jason "JT" Thomas. He has performed as a session and touring musician with Erykah Badu, David Crosby, Kirk Franklin, Ledisi, Dave Chappelle and others.

In 2011 Lettieri started releasing his solo works. He has released several solo albums, three of which have charted on the Billboard Jazz Albums Chart. (Note: Albums Spark and Echo, Deep: The Baritone Sessions, Things of That Nature charted at #11, 21, 12 respectively.) Lettieri describes his style as textural and groove-based performance, with serving the song being first priority. His 2021 album Deep: The Baritone Sessions Vol. 2 was nominated for a Grammy award in the category Best Contemporary Instrumental Album.

In 2021, the PRS Guitars company introduced Lettieri's signature guitar, named Fiore, which incorporates his design preferences. Also in 2021 Lettieri and Apple Inc. created a package of guitar loops for digital audio workstations.

== Equipment ==
Lettieri's primary instruments include his signature PRS Fiore, (Note: Lettieri's signature PRS Fiore was introduced in 2021.) a Fender/Grosh hybrid Stratocaster, a Grosh NOS Retro, a PRS McCarty 594 and a Bacci Leonardo baritone guitar. His primary amplifiers are the Supro Statesman and Kemper Profiler. He uses J. Rockett, MXR, Jackson Audio, and TC Electronic pedals and Dunlop nickel-wound strings. He also uses a variety of other instruments and accessories as needed.

== Personal life ==
Lettieri lives in Fort Worth, Texas. He is married and has a daughter. In college he competed in track and field.

== Discography ==
Studio albums

- Knows (2011)
- Futurefun (2013)
- Spark and Echo (2016)
- Things of That Nature (2019)
- Deep: The Baritone Sessions, Vol. 2 (2021)
- Can I Tell You Something? (2024)

Extended plays

- Deep: The Baritone Sessions (2019)
- Fly Through It (2022)

Live albums

- Out by Midnight: Live at the Iridium (2023)

with The Fearless Flyers

- The Fearless Flyers (2018)
- The Fearless Flyers II (2019)
- Tailwinds (2020)
- Flyers Live at Madison Square Garden (2021)
- The Fearless Flyers III (2022)
- The Fearless Flyers IV (2024)
- The Fearless Flyers V (2025)
- Live In Italy (2025)

with Snarky Puppy

- Bring Us the Bright (2008)
- Tell Your Friends (2010)
- GroundUP (2012)
- Family Dinner – Volume 1 (2013)
- We Like It Here (2014)
- Sylva with Metropole Orkest (2015)
- Family Dinner – Volume 2 (2016)
- Culcha Vulcha (2016)
- Immigrance (2019)
- Live at the Royal Albert Hall (2020)
- Empire Central (2022)
- Somni with Metropole Orkest (2025)

Session discography selected works

Artist	Album
David Crosby	Sky Trails (2017)
Kirk Franklin	Losing My Religion (2015); Long Live Love (2019)
Ledisi	Let Love Rule (2017)
Anthony Evans	Real Life/Real Worship (2014)
Ghost-Note	Swagism (2018)
Larnell Lewis	In the Moment (2018)
Tasha Page-Lockhart	Here Right Now (2014); The Beautiful Project (2017)
Fred Hammond	God, Love & Romance (2012); I Will Trust (2014)
Tamela Mann	The Master Plan (2009); Best Days (2012); One Way (2016)
Shaun Martin	7 Summers (2015)
Tori Kelly	Hiding Place (2018)
The Walls Group	Fast Forward (2014)
Lecrae	Anomaly (2014)
Sungazer	Against the Fall of Night (2024)
