= Losing My Religion (album) =

Studio album by Kirk Franklin
- Released: November 13, 2015
- Genres: Christian R&B, urban contemporary gospel, R&B
- Length: 1:00:54
- Labels: RCA Inspiration, RCA, Fo Yo Soul
- Producers: Franklin; Shaun Martin; Max Stark (co); Ronald Hill (co)

Kirk Franklin chronology
| Hello Fear (2011) | Losing My Religion (2015) | Long Live Love (2019) |

Losing My Religion is the eleventh studio album from Kirk Franklin. The record was released the album on November 13, 2015, after the established Verity Gospel Music Group and Jive partnership was replaced with the consolidation of RCA Records and Verity in late 2011, which led to both a partnership with RCA and the RCA Inspiration in 2013. The record won the Grammy Award for Best Gospel Album in 2017.

== Critical reception ==
Professional ratings
Review scores
| Source | Rating |
|---|---|
| AllMusic | 4/5 stars |
| CCM Magazine | 4/5 stars |
| The Christian Beat | 4/5 stars |
| Cross Rhythms | 10/10 squares |
| New Release Today | 5/5 stars |

Signaling in a ten out of ten review from Cross Rhythms, Tony Cummings called the album "a great comeback". Matt Conner, indicating in a four star review by CCM Magazine, stated "Losing My Religion is every bit the spirited, charismatic and powerful album you’d expect (and hope for) from the seven-time GRAMMY winner." Awarding the album five stars at New Release Today, Dwayne Lacy stated, "This is vintage Kirk!" Thom Jurek of AllMusic gave the album four out of five stars, praising the album for its message and concept saying "It's a rhyming, socio-political-spiritual manifesto, an admonition to evangelists that religion masks God's love and mercy; it's a barrier rather than a bridge."

== Commercial performance ==
The album debuted at number 10 on the Billboard 200 with first-week sales of 35,000 copies.

== Track listing ==
All music is composed by Kirk Franklin except where noted.

| No. | Title | Writer(s) | Length |
|---|---|---|---|
| 1. | "Losing My Religion" | | 3:21 |
| 2. | "Miracles" | | 5:53 |
| 3. | "123 Victory" | Kirk Franklin and Lawrence Parker | 3:57 |
| 4. | "Road Trip" | | 4:00 |
| 5. | "Pray for Me" | | 4:45 |
| 6. | "Wanna Be Happy?" (contains portion of "Tired of Being Alone" by Al Green) | Kirk Franklin and Al Green | 4:25 |
| 7. | "It's Time" (featuring Tasha Page-Lockhart and Zacardi Cortez) | | 4:03 |
| 8. | "True Story" | | 4:20 |
| 9. | "Over" | | 4:16 |
| 10. | "When" (featuring Kim Burrell and Lalah Hathaway) | | 5:17 |
| 11. | "My World Needs You" (featuring Sarah Reeves, Tasha Cobbs and Tamela Mann) | | 7:16 |
| 12. | "Intercession" | | 5:06 |
| 13. | "No Sleep Tonight" | | 4:15 |
| Total length: | | | 60:54 |

== Personnel ==
=== Vocalists ===
- Faith Anderson
- Melodie Davis
- Chelsea West
- Michael Bethany
- Amber Bullock
- Caltomeesh "Candy" West
- Crystal Aikin
- Myron Butler
- Niya Cotton
- Anthony Evans
- Nathan Myers
- Shawlesa Amos
- Darian Yancey
- Joy Hill
- James Henderson
- Dalon Collins
- Deonis Cook
- Maurice Brown
- Adrian Oneal
- Patron Thomas
- Shaun Martin
- Deon Yancey
- Darius Dixon
- Elgin Johnson
- Sydnii Raymore
- Teaira Dunn
- Emoni Wilkins
- John Montes

=== Instrumentalists ===
- Kirk Franklin – piano, keyboards
- Shaun Martin – keyboards, piano
- Keith Taylor – bass
- Robert Searight – drums
- Braylon Lacy – bass, upright bass
- Mark Lettieri – lead guitar
- Kermit Wells – Hammond B-3
- Max Stark – programming
- Philip Lassiter – trumpet, flugelhorn
- Tyler Summers – tenor and baritone saxophone
- Roy Agee – trombone and bass trombone

== Charts ==
=== Weekly charts ===
| Chart (2015–2016) | Peak position |
|---|---|
| South Korean International Albums (Gaon) | 27 |
| UK Christian & Gospel Albums (OCC) | 2 |
| UK R&B Albums (Official Charts) | 24 |
| US Billboard 200 | 10 |
| US Top Gospel Albums (Billboard) | 1 |
| US Top R&B/Hip-Hop Albums (Billboard) | 3 |

=== Year-end charts ===
| Chart (2016) | Position |
|---|---|
| US Top Gospel Albums (Billboard) | 1 |
| US Top R&B/Hip-Hop Albums (Billboard) | 17 |

=== Decade-end charts ===
| Chart (2010–2021) | Peak position |
|---|---|
| US Top Gospel Albums (Billboard) | 7 |
