= Hello Fear =

Studio album by Kirk Franklin
- Released: March 22, 2011
- Recorded: 2010
- Genre: Urban contemporary gospel
- Length: 77:49
- Label: Verity/Jive/Fo Yo Soul
- Producer: Franklin; Harris; Lewis; Tackett

Kirk Franklin chronology
The Fight of My Life (2007)	Hello Fear (2011)	Losing My Religion (2015)

Singles from Hello Fear
- 1. "I Smile" Released: February 15, 2011; 2. "A God Like You" Released: 2011; 3. "Before I Die" Released: 2011

Professional ratings
Review scores
Source	Rating
AllMusic	3.5/5 stars

Hello Fear is the tenth studio album by Kirk Franklin. The record was also on the newly established Verity Gospel Music Group and Jive partnership, after Jive had replaced Zomba. The first single "I Smile" reached number 85 on the Billboard Hot 100, making it his first single in six years to appear on that chart; last single to do so was "Looking for You" in 2005 which reached number 61. The album debuted at number five on the Billboard 200 with 87,000 copies sold in the first week, becoming his first album in nine years to debut in the top ten; last album being The Rebirth of Kirk Franklin in 2002 which debuted at number four. The album has sold over 401,000 copies, ranking as the 64th highest selling album in the US in 2011. On February 12, 2012, the album was certified Gold by the RIAA. In 2012, the album won Grammy Award for Best Gospel Album. As of August 2015, the album has sold 572,000 copies in the US.

== Track listing ==
Written, arranged, and produced by Kirk, except where noted. Co-produced by Shaun Martin.

No.	Title	Writer(s)	Producer(s)	Length
1.	"Hello Fear"			5:34
2.	"The Story of Fear"			1:10
3.	"Before I Die"			4:24
4.	"I Am"			5:36
5.	"But the Blood"		Martin; Bobby Sparks (co); Franklin	4:06
6.	"Everyone Hurts"			6:33
7.	"I Smile"	Franklin; Fred Tackett; Jimmy Jam & Terry Lewis		5:08
8.	"Give Me" (featuring Mali Music)		Franklin; Sparks; Martin	6:29
9.	"Never Alone (Interlude)"			1:05
10.	"The Altar" (featuring Marvin Sapp & Beverly Crawford)		Franklin; Sparks; Martin	6:59
11.	"Something About the Name Jesus Pt. 2" (featuring Rance Allen, Marvin Winans, John P. Kee & Isaac Carree)			5:37
12.	"Today"			5:31
13.	"The Moment #1"		Franklin; Sparks; Martin	6:12
14.	"The Moment #2"		Franklin; Sparks; Martin	7:07
15.	"A God Like You"	Franklin; William Jeffrey	Franklin; Sparks; Martin	6:18
Total length:				77:49

== Personnel ==
=== Main vocalists/ensemble ===
- Nikki Ross, 1st Soprano
- Anaysha Figueroa, 2nd Soprano
- Cheryl Fortune, 1st Alto
- Charmaine Swimpson, 2nd Alto
- Eric Moore, 1st Tenor
- Isaac Carree, 2nd Tenor

=== Additional vocalists ===
- Candy West (soprano)
- Faith Anderson (soprano)
- Peaches West (alto)
- Debette Draper (alto)
- Michael Bethany (tenor)
- Deonis Cook (tenor)
- Myron Butler (tenor)

=== Musicians ===
- Kirk Franklin - Keyboards
- Shaun Martin - Keyboards, Programming
- Bobby Sparks - Hammond B-3, Programming
- Terry Baker - Drums, Percussion
- Todd Parsnow - Lead Guitar
- Keith Taylor - Bass Guitar
- Ernest "Ernie G" Green - DJ
- Darius Fentress - Percussion
- Matt Butler - Cello
- Robert "Sput" Searight - Snare
- Doc Powell - Lead Guitar
- Nat Powers - Drums, Programming, Keys
- Philip Lassiter - Trumpet, Flugelhorn
- Jeff Coffin - Baritone Saxophone, Flute Trio
- Nick Marchione - Lead Trumpet
- Doug DeHays - Baritone Saxophone
- Brian Clancey - Flute
- Teddy Riley - Vocoder, Voice-Box

=== Engineering ===
- Rob Chiarelli: Mix Engineer

== Charts ==
=== Weekly charts ===
Chart (2011)	Peak position
UK Christian & Gospel Albums (OCC)	20
US Billboard 200	5
US Top Gospel Albums (Billboard)	1
US Top R&B/Hip-Hop Albums (Billboard)	3

=== Year-end charts ===
Chart (2011)	Position
US Billboard 200	70
US Top Gospel Albums (Billboard)	1
US Top R&B/Hip-Hop Albums (Billboard)	16
Chart (2012)	Position
US Top Gospel Albums (Billboard)	11
US Top R&B/Hip-Hop Albums (Billboard)	59
Chart (2025)	Position
US Top Gospel Albums (Billboard)	13

=== Decade-end charts ===
Chart (2010s)	Peak position
US Top Gospel Albums (Billboard)	9

== Certifications ==
Region	Certification	Certified units/sales
United States (RIAA)	Gold	500,000^{^}
^{^} Shipments figures based on certification alone.
