= Bob Reynolds (saxophonist) =

American musician (born 1977)

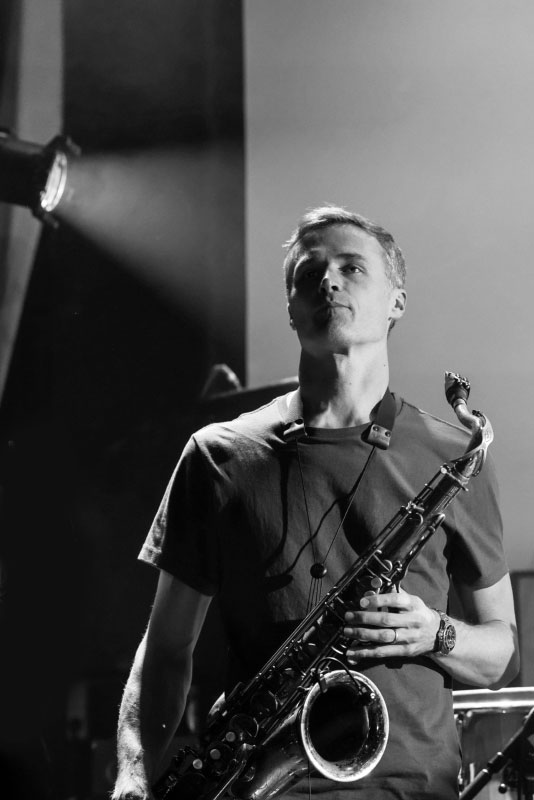
- Reynolds in Aarhus (Denmark 2019); Photo Hreinn Gudlaugsson

Background information
- Born: September 29, 1977 (age 48); Morristown, New Jersey
- Genres: Jazz
- Occupation: Musician
- Instruments: Tenor saxophone, soprano saxophone,
- Website: bobreynoldsmusic.com

Bob Reynolds is an American jazz tenor saxophonist. A solo recording artist since 2000, he has been a member of the genre-bending instrumental group Snarky Puppy since 2014, winning Grammy Awards with the band for the albums Culcha Vulcha Live at the Royal Albert Hall, and Empire Central.

== Biography ==
Born in Morristown, New Jersey, his family moved to Jacksonville, Florida. He started playing saxophone at age 13 and attended high school at Douglas Anderson School of the Arts with a well-known jazz band. After graduating, he attended Berklee College of Music where he studied with George Garzone and Hal Crook. He has played with John Mayer's band for five years, and has also worked with Brian Blade, Aaron Goldberg, Gregory Hutchinson, The 1975, and Tom Harrell.

His 2006 album Can't Wait for Perfect was voted Best Debut in the Village Voice jazz poll. Reynolds received a Grammy Award with Snarky Puppy in 2017, four ASCAP Young Jazz Composer awards, and Berklee's Billboard Magazine Endowed Scholarship.

== Discography ==
=== As leader ===
- Live at the Jazz Corner (BRM, 2003)
- Can't Wait for Perfect (Fresh Sound, 2005)
- Live in New York (BRM, 2010)
- A Live Life (BRM, 2011)
- Somewhere In Between (BRM, 2013)
- Déjà Vu (BRM, 2015)
- Guitar Band (BRM, 2017)
- Hindsight (BRM, 2017)
- Quartet (BRM, 2018)
- A Message for Mobley (BRM, 2019)
- Runway (BRM, 2020)
- Boston 2000 (BRM, 2022)

=== As sideman ===
With Snarky Puppy

- We Like It Here (Ropeadope, 2014)
- Culcha Vulcha (GroundUP, 2016)
- Immigrance (GroundUP, 2019)
- Live at the Royal Albert Hall, (GroundUP, 2020)
- Empire Central (GroundUP, 2022)
- Somni, with Metropole Orkest (GroundUP, 2025)

With others

- Janek Gwizdala, The Space In Between (Gwizmon, 2010)
- John Mayer, Where the Light Is (Columbia, 2008)
- John Mayer, Battle Studies (BMG, 2009)
- Ninja Sex Party, "Smooth Talkin'"
- Jonah Smith, Industry Rule (BGR, 2001)
- Jonah Smith, Beneath the Underdog (BGR, 2003)
- Anthony Wilson, Frogtown (Goat Hill, 2016)
- The 1975, "Notes on a Conditional Form" (Dirty Hit, 2020)
- 2017 Cosmopolitain, Kamil Rustam

== Awards and honors ==
- 4x ASCAP Young Jazz Composer Awards
- Berklee's Billboard Magazine Endowed Scholarship
- 2016: Member of Snarky Puppy on Culcha Vulcha, Grammy Award for Best Contemporary Instrumental Album
- 2021: Member of Snarky Puppy on Live at the Royal Albert Hall,, Grammy Award for Best Contemporary Instrumental Album.
- 2023: Member of Snarky Puppy on Empire Central, Grammy Award for Best Contemporary Instrumental Album.
