= Nikki Glaspie =

Nikki Glaspie playing with Soulive in 2010

Nikki Glaspie (born December 25, 1983) is an American drummer and vocalist. Born in Fredericksburg, Virginia to a family of ministers, she started playing the drums for her church worship band. After graduating Southeast Raleigh High in Raleigh, North Carolina, she attended the Berklee College of Music until 2005. While attending college in Boston, she often anchored jazz and funk jams at Wally's Cafe.

After college, she toured and recorded a live album with Martin Luther McCoy. Afterward, she auditioned and was selected to join Suga Mama, the backing band for Beyoncé. She plays on several singles from the 4 album, including "1+1" and "Love On Top". She remained with the group until 2010, departing after the I Am... Tour to pursue her interest in funk music.

At the request of Ivan Neville, she joined Dumpstaphunk, a funk band based in New Orleans. She performed with the band from 2011 to 2014, recording the studio album Dirty Word with them, before leaving to focus on her own musical goals.

Glaspie is the bandleader of Nth Power, a jam band formed with guitarist Nick Cassarino, keyboardist Nigel Hall, and bassist Nate Edgar. The band name was derived from their shared first initial. They released their debut album, Abundance, in 2015. In addition to her work with Nth Power, she also is part of Punkadelick, a trio featuring vibraphonist Mike Dillon and keyboardist Brian Haas.

In 2025 and 2026, Glaspie recorded with the jazz collective Snarky Puppy on the album Somni and with singer Allison Russell on In the Hour of Chaos. She also auditioned for the band Primus but was ultimately passed over in favor of John Hoffman.

Glaspie identifies as queer.

== Discography ==
=== With Allison Russell ===
- In the Hour of Chaos (2026)

=== With Beyoncé ===
- I Am... Yours: An Intimate Performance at Wynn Las Vegas (2009)
- 4 (2011)

=== With Dumpstaphunk ===
- Dirty Word (2013)

=== With Nth Power ===
- Abundance (2015)
- Live To Be Free (2017)
- Reverence (2021)
- Never Alone (2026)

=== With Snarky Puppy ===
- Somni (2025)
