= Family Dinner =

Family Dinner may refer to:

- Family Dinner – Volume 1, 2013 album by American jazz fusion group Snarky Puppy
- Family Dinner – Volume 2, 2016 album by Snarky Puppy
- Family Dinner, a 2021 television show hosted by Andrew Zimmern
