= The Only Constant =

Studio album by Snarky Puppy
- Released: March 6, 2006
- Recorded: 2006
- Genre: Jazz
- Length: 44:06
- Label: Sitmom

Snarky Puppy chronology
The Only Constant (2006)	The World Is Getting Smaller (2007)

The Only Constant is the first studio album by American jazz fusion group Snarky Puppy that was released in 2006.

== Track listing ==
All tracks are written by Michael League.

No.	Title	Length
1.	"Open Forum"	10:34
2.	"Hot and Bothered"	8:36
3.	"Precipice"	8:45
4.	"Revisited"	7:51
5.	"Oblongata"	8:20

== Personnel ==
- Michael League – bass guitar, double bass
- Jay Jennings – trumpet, flugelhorn
- Sara Jacovino – trombone
- Brian Donohoe – soprano saxophone, alto saxophone
- Clay Pritchard – tenor saxophone
- Bob Lanzetti – electric guitar
- Chris McQueen – electric guitar, acoustic guitar
- Bill Laurance – piano, electric piano
- Ross Pederson – drums
- Nate Werth – percussion
