= Amkeni =

Studio album by Bukuru Celestin and Snarky Puppy
- Released: 2013
- Recorded: February 2013
- Studio: The Music Lab at Jefferson Center in Roanoke, Virginia
- Genre: Jazz fusion, World music
- Length: 33:11
- Label: Ropeadope
- Producer: Michael League

Bukuru Celestin and Snarky Puppy chronology
groundUP (2012)	Amkeni (2013)	Family Dinner – Volume 1 (2013)

Amkeni is an album by Burundian singer-songwriter Bukuru Celestin and the jazz fusion group Snarky Puppy that was released in 2013. It is the first of two cooperative albums by Snarky Puppy and other performers that were recorded at the Jefferson Center in Roanoke, Virginia in 2013, with the second being Family Dinner – Volume 1.

== Track listing ==
All song lyrics by Bukuru Celestin and all arrangements by Michael League; all music composed as noted.

No.	Title	Length
1.	"Ndagukunda" (Bukuru Celestin)	5:14
2.	"Shima" (Michael League)	4:08
3.	"Nyabugingo" (Bukuru Celestin & Michael League)	5:02
4.	"Amkeni" (Michael League & Bukuru Celestin)	7:56
5.	"Ntumbero" (Michael League & Bukuru Celestin)	4:16
6.	"Muzogezahe" (Michael League & Bukuru Celestin)	6:35

== Personnel ==
- Bukuru Celestin, vocals
- Ephrazie Niyonzima, vocals
- Elvanie Niyibigira, vocals
- Furaha Ndayishimiyi, vocals
- Roanoke International Choir, backing vocals on tracks 3, 4, 5

Snarky Puppy:

- Michael League – electric guitar, baritone guitar, 6 & 12 string acoustic guitars, electric bass guitar, Moog bass & keyboards
- Bob Lanzetti – electric guitar
- Cory Henry – Hammond B3 organ & Fender Rhodes
- Mike Maher – trumpet & flugelhorn
- Chris Bullock – tenor saxophone, flute & clarinet
- Nate Werth – percussion
- Jason "JT" Thomas – drums
- Bill Laurance – piano on track 6
