= The World Is Getting Smaller =

The World is Getting Smaller

Studio album by Snarky Puppy
- Released: 2007
- Recorded: January 19, 2007
- Genre: Jazz fusion
- Length: 59:29
- Label: Ropeadope

Snarky Puppy chronology
The Only Constant (2006)	The World is Getting Smaller (2007)	Bring Us the Bright (2008)

The World is Getting Smaller is an album by American jazz fusion group Snarky Puppy that was released in 2007.

== Track listing ==
All songs composed and arranged by Michael League, except Thorn/Briar (Brian Donohoe) and Fair Play (Chris McQueen)

No.	Title	Length
1.	"Native Sons"	8:54
2.	"Intelligent Design"	8:26
3.	"Alma"	8:16
4.	"Thorn"	5:35
5.	"The World is Getting Smaller"	5:55
6.	"Briar"	8:20
7.	"Phoebus"	6:47
8.	"Fair Play"	7:16

== Personnel ==
- Michael League – bass guitar
- Jay Jennings – trumpet, flugelhorn
- Sara Jacovino – trombone
- Brian Donohoe – soprano & alto saxophones, clarinet
- Clay Pritchard – tenor saxophone, bass clarinet
- Kait Dunton – synthesizer
- Bob Lanzetti – electric guitar (Tracks 1–7)
- Chris McQueen – electric guitar (All tracks)
- José Aponte – drums (Tracks 3 & 5), percussion (Tracks 3 & 8)
- Rob Avsharian – drums (Tracks 1,2,6 & 7)
- Steve Pruitt – drums (All tracks)
- Nate Werth – percussion
- Juan Alamo – percussion (Track 8)
