= Sylva (album) =

Live album by Snarky Puppy and Metropole Orkest
- Released: May 26, 2015
- Recorded: April 19–20, 2014
- Venues: Energiehuis, Dordrecht, Netherlands
- Genre: Jazz fusion
- Length: 54:29
- Label: Impulse!

Snarky Puppy chronology
We Like It Here (2014)	Sylva (2015)	Family Dinner – Volume 2 (2016)

Metropole Orkest chronology
Karmaflow (2015)	Sylva (2015)	Clear Day (2015)

Professional ratings
Review scores
Source	Rating
The Guardian	4/5 stars

Sylva is an album by American jazz fusion group Snarky Puppy that was released on May 26, 2015. It marked the first official collaboration between the band and the Metropole Orkest from the Netherlands, with the second collaboration culminating in another album, Somni, which released on November 21, 2025. Sylva won the Grammy Award for Best Contemporary Instrumental Album at the 58th Annual Grammy Awards. Like many of the group's previous albums, Sylva was recorded in front of a live studio audience for four performances over two nights.

The album later received a remix and remaster, spearheaded by the group's current chief recording engineer and audio mixer Nic Hard, which released on November 8, 2024.

== Music ==
According to Michael League, the group's leader and bassist, each song on the album is about a different forest. The governing concept of the music was to "capture the many sides and personalities" of forests. League describes them as "a place that is at once innocent, frightening, awe-inspiring, impenetrable, fragile, stoic, telling, a shelter, a labyrinth, a temple, a tomb, a sanctuary, a parliament, a prison. The forest."

=== Sintra ===
"Sintra" depicts the forested mountains of Sintra, Portugal.

=== Flight ===
Rather than describing one distinct landscape or setting, "Flight" describes the journey of physically traveling through a forest's canopy (or between forests). It also refers to a literal flight from Portugal to the United States.

Soloists (in order of appearance):

- Chris Bullock — tenor saxophone
- Justin Stanton — Fender Rhodes
- Cory Henry — Hammond B3 organ

=== Atchafalaya ===
"Atchafalaya" takes its name from the wooded swamps of the Atchafalaya Basin in southern Louisiana.

Soloists (in order of appearance):

- Vincent Veneman — trombone
- Chris McQueen — electric guitar

=== The Curtain ===
"The Curtain" depicts the redwood forests of Northern California.

Soloists (in order of appearance):

- Jay Jennings — flugelhorn
- Michael League — bass guitar
- Cory Henry — Moog
- Bill Laurance — piano

=== Gretel ===
Similar to "Flight" in that the track does not attach itself to a specific real-world forest, "Gretel" instead aims to depict a conceptual, dark, looming wood, most likely paying some form of homage to the Brothers Grimm story Hansel and Gretel. League describes it as "the dark wood that lived in all of our heads as children, the one that we dreamt of being lost in, consumed by, and then woke up sweating, running to our parents room for reassurance."

=== The Clearing ===
League attributes the setting of "The Clearing" to "the land behind my neighbor's house in Virginia."

Soloists (in order of appearance):

- Mark Lettieri — electric guitar
- Mike "Maz" Maher — trumpet

== Track listing ==
All tracks are written by Michael League.

No.	Title	Arranger(s)	Length
1.	"Sintra"	League, Jules Buckley	3:32
2.	"Flight"	League, Buckley	6:03
3.	"Atchafalaya"	League, Buckley	6:04
4.	"The Curtain"	League, Buckley	15:09
5.	"Gretel"	League, Buckley, Chris McQueen, Ben Cottrell	4:21
6.	"The Clearing"	League, Buckley	19:23
Total length:			54:32

== Personnel ==
Adapted directly from the album's liner notes.

=== Snarky Puppy ===
- Michael League – bass guitar, Moog bass
- Mike "Maz" Maher – trumpet, flugelhorn
- Jay Jennings – trumpet, flugelhorn
- Chris Bullock – tenor saxophone, bass clarinet, clarinet
- Cory Henry – Hammond B3 organ, Moog, clavinet
- Bill Laurance – piano, Wurlitzer, Moog
- Justin Stanton – Fender Rhodes, Moog, clavinet, piano, trumpet
- Bob Lanzetti – electric guitar
- Mark Lettieri – electric guitar
- Chris McQueen – electric guitar
- Robert "Sput" Searight – drums
- Nate Werth – percussion

=== Metropole Orkest ===
- Conductor – Jules Buckley
- 1st Violin – Arlia de Ruiter (concertmaster), Vera Laporeva, Denis Koenders, David Peijnenborgh, Pauline Terlouw, Casper Donker, Ruben Margarita, Tinka Regter, Seijia Teeuwen, Ewa Zbyszynska
- 2nd Violin – Merijn Rombout, Herman van Haaren, Wim Kok, Feyona van Iersel, Pauline Koning, Polina Cekov, Merel Jonker, Christina Knoll
- Viola – Mieke Honingh, Norman Jansen, Julia Jowett, Isabella Petersen, Iris Schut, Lex Luijnenburg
- Cello – Maarten Jansen, Emile Visser, Jascha Albracht, Annie Tangberg, Charles Watt
- Double Bass – Erik Winkelmann, Arend Liefkes, Tjerk de Vos
- Flute – Janine Abbas, Mariël van den Bos, Nola Exel
- Clarinet, Bass Clarinet, Contrabass Clarinet, and Saxophone – Paul van der Feen, Leo van Oostrom, Leo Janssen, Werner Janssen, Max Boeree
- Horn – Pieter Hunfeld, Rob van de Laar, Fons Verspaandonk, Elizabeth Hunfeld
- Trombone – Jan Oosting, Vincent Veneman, Jan Bastiani
- Bass Trombone – Martin van den Berg
- Tuba – Ries Schellekens
- Percussion – Murk Jiskoot, Frank Warndenier

=== Technical staff ===
- Eric Hartman – chief recording engineer
- Dirk Overeem – recording engineer
- Michael Harrison – monitor engineer
