= Long, Live, Love =

Long Live Love

Studio album by Kirk Franklin
- Released: May 31, 2019
- Genre: Gospel
- Length: 49:35
- Label: RCA Inspiration; Fo Yo Soul

Kirk Franklin chronology
Losing My Religion (2015)	Long Live Love (2019)	Kingdom Book One (2022)

Long Live Love is the twelfth studio album by American musician Kirk Franklin. RCA Inspiration, a division of RCA Records, alongside Fo Yo Soul Recordings released the album on May 31, 2019. It debuted at number-one on the US Top Gospel Albums chart, becoming his 13th release to top the chart, with 20,000 equivalent album units earned in its first week. With this, Franklin became the first artist to simultaneously top all five Billboard gospel charts: Top Gospel Albums, Hot Gospel Songs, Gospel Airplay, Gospel Streaming Songs and Gospel Digital Song Sales.

The album won two Grammys at the 62nd Annual Grammy Awards: Best Gospel Album while the single "Love Theory" won Best Gospel Song.

== Background ==
Following the release of the first single, "Love Theory", the title of the album was announced in March 2019 along with its release date and an upcoming tour in support of the album.

== Critical reception ==
Professional ratings
Review scores
Source	Rating
Hallels	4/5 stars

Timothy Yap of Hallels.com gave the album a positive review, rating the album 4 stars out of 5. In his review he said "It canvasses a plethora of topics from social hatred to idolatry to the Cross. It exposes us to all sub-genres of Gospel music from old school choir to soul-massaging ballads. In short, this album contains everything we love about Franklin."

== Track listing ==
No.	Title	Length
1.	"F.A.V.O.R"	4:31
2.	"Love Theory"	4:11
3.	"Idols"	3:26
4.	"Just for Me"	4:35
5.	"Father Knows Best"	6:31
6.	"OK"	3:56
7.	"Strong God"	4:05
8.	"Forever/Beautiful Grace"	7:10
9.	"Spiritual"	5:24
10.	"Wynter's Promise"	5:46

*All songs written by Kirk Franklin*

== Personnel ==
=== Musicians ===
- Kirk Franklin: Keyboards
- Shaun Martin: Keyboards, Programming, Additional Keyboards
- Mark Lettieri: Guitar
- Kermit Wells: Hammond B-3
- Matthew Ramsey: Bass
- Caziah Franklin: Drums
- Maxwell Stark: Programming
- Johnnie Murray: Guitar
- Mike Bereal: Hammond B-3
- Keith Taylor: Bass
- Terry Baker: Drums
- Philip Lassiter: Trumpet
- Doug DeHays: Saxophone
- Erik Hughes: Trombone

=== Vocalists ===
- Anaysha Figueroa
- Charmaine Broome
- Melodie Rose
- Amber Bullock
- Darian Yancey
- Minon Sarten
- Emerald Boyd
- Sharon Willingham
- Deon Yancey
- Eric Dawkins
- Isaac Carree
- Michael Bethany

== Charts ==
Chart (2019)	Peak position
UK Christian & Gospel Albums (OCC)	3
US Billboard 200	20
US Top Gospel Albums (Billboard)	1
US Top R&B/Hip-Hop Albums (Billboard)	12
