= Immigrance =

Studio album by Snarky Puppy
- Released: March 15, 2019
- Genres: Jazz fusion; funk
- Label: GroundUP
- Producers: Michael League; Snarky Puppy

Snarky Puppy chronology
Culcha Vulcha (2016)	Immigrance (2019)	Live at the Royal Albert Hall (2020)

Professional ratings
Review scores
Source	Rating
AllMusic	4/5 stars
Atwood Magazine	8.5/10 stars
DownBeat	1.5/5 stars

Immigrance is the thirteenth album by American jazz fusion group Snarky Puppy. It was released on March 15, 2019, and debuted at #2 on the Billboard Jazz Albums chart in the United States.

== Track listing ==
No.	Title	Length
1.	"Chonks" (Michael League)	8:32
2.	"Bigly Strictness" (Michael League)	7:37
3.	"Coven" (Chris McQueen)	6:38
4.	"Bling Bling" (Chris Bullock)	5:55
5.	"Xavi" (Michael League)	9:31
6.	"While We're Young" (Mike 'Maz' Maher)	2:42
7.	"Bad Kids to the Back" (Justin Stanton)	5:46
8.	"Even Us" (Michael League)	7:44

== Personnel ==
Adapted from liner notes.

- Michael League – bass guitar, oud
- Jay Jennings – trumpet, flugelhorn
- Mike Maher – trumpet, flugelhorn
- Chris Bullock – tenor and soprano saxophones, bass clarinet, flute, alto flute, bansuri, metal pife
- Bob Reynolds – tenor saxophone
- Zach Brock – violin
- Bill Laurance – piano, Fender Rhodes, keyboards, synthesizers
- Shaun Martin – Minimoog, clavinet, keyboards
- Bobby Sparks – Hammond B3 organ, clavinet, Minimoog, keyboards
- Justin Stanton – Fender Rhodes, Prophet 6, keyboards, trumpet
- Bob Lanzetti – guitars
- Mark Lettieri – guitars
- Chris McQueen – guitars
- Larnell Lewis – drums
- Keita Ogawa – drums, percussion
- Jamison Ross – drums
- Jason Thomas – drums
- Marcelo Woloski – drums, percussion
- Nate Werth – percussion
