= Larnell Lewis =

Canadian musician (born 1984)

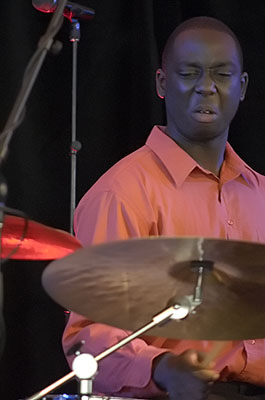
- Lewis at Port Hope Jazz Festival, 2008

Background information
- Born: March 22, 1984 (age 42); Toronto, Ontario, Canada
- Genres: Jazz; jazz fusion; R&B
- Occupations: Musician, drummer, session musician and educator
- Instrument: Drums
- Website: www.larnelllewismusic.com

Larnell Lewis (born March 22, 1984) is a Canadian drummer, composer, producer, and educator. He is best known for playing drums with the Denton, TX-based jazz fusion band Snarky Puppy.

== Biography ==
Born in Toronto, Ontario, Lewis started playing drums at age 2 and was first introduced to drums in church. This is where he began to learn to play a variety of styles including gospel music, soca, calypso, reggae, zouk and funk. He also studied electric bass and piano to further his knowledge of the melodic and harmonic aspects of music making. Lewis’ parents were originally from St. Kitts and Nevis in the Caribbean. His younger brother, Ricky is the touring drummer for The Weeknd.

Lewis attended Humber College, where he was the 2004 recipient of the Oscar Peterson Award for Outstanding Achievement in Music, the highest award given by the institution. Lewis was featured on the cover of the September 2016 issue of Modern Drummer magazine, alongside fellow Snarky Puppy drummers Robert “Sput” Searight and Jason “JT” Thomas. In 2017 Lewis was named one of the Top 35 artists under 35 by CBC Music, and also received the award for Emerging Jazz Artist from the Ontario Arts Foundation. Lewis served as musical director for a performance during the Toronto International Film Festival's premiere of the critically acclaimed documentary Quincy, about famed producer Quincy Jones, where he led performances from the likes of Yebba Smith, Mark Ronson, and Chaka Khan.

In 2018 Lewis released his first solo album, In The Moment, on which he played bass, drums, guitar, keyboards, melodica, percussion, piano, synthesizer and vocals, in addition to writing and producing.

In February 2021 Lewis recorded a video for the YouTube channel Drumeo in which he listened to the Metallica song "Enter Sandman" for the first time, then played the drum part of the entire song after having heard it one time. The video went viral, with over 19 million views as of February 2025.

== Session work ==
As of September 2022, Lewis is an active member of the jazz fusion band Snarky Puppy. He has also played with Laila Biali, Fred Hammond, Michael Brecker, Matt Dusk, Robi Botos, Molly Johnson, Elizabeth Shepherd, Emilie-Claire Barlow, Barbra Lica, and Tia Brazda.

Lewis's performance on Snarky Puppy's 2014 album We Like It Here was notable because he learned most of the songs on the airplane flight to the Netherlands, having only played two of them before the recording date. He also played on the group's 2016 albums Culcha Vulcha, which won the Grammy Award for Best Contemporary Instrumental Album, and Family Dinner – Volume 2.

Lewis has also played on the JUNO Award-winning albums Clear Day by jazz singer Emilie-Claire Barlow, and Root Structure by jazz bassist Mike Downes.

== Equipment ==
Lewis is endorsed by Yamaha Drums, Zildjian, Promark, Evans, D’Addario, and Latin Percussion.

== Discography ==
=== Solo ===
- In the Moment (2018)
- Relive the Moment (2020)
- Slice of Life (2024)

=== With Snarky Puppy ===
- We Like It Here (GroundUP, 2014)
- Family Dinner – Volume 2 (GroundUP, Universal Music Classics, 2016)
- Culcha Vulcha (GroundUP, 2016)
- Immigrance (GroundUP, 2019)
- Empire Central (GroundUP, 2022)
- Somni (GroundUP, 2025)

=== Other artists ===
- Laila Biali (2018), Tracing Light (2010), From Sea to Sky (2007)
- Robi Botos – Old Soul (2018)
- Tia Brazda – Daydream (2018)
- Rich Brown – Abeng (2016)
- Barbra Lica – I'm Still Learning (2016)
- David Clayton-Thomas – Canadian (2016)
- Emilie-Claire Barlow – Clear Day (2015)
- Elizabeth Shepherd – The Signal (2014)
- Colleen Allen – Flashlight (2013)
- Richard Underhill – Free Spirit (2011)
- Anjulie – Anjulie (2009)
- Mike Janzen Trio – Mombâcho (2008)
- Toronto Mass Choir – Going Home (2007)
- Rhema Worship & Praise – The Experience (2006)
- Jeremy Ledbetter Trio – Got a Light? (2018), Gravity (2024)

== Awards and recognition ==
- 2004 recipient of the Oscar Peterson Award for Outstanding Achievement in Music.
- 2016 Grammy Award, Snarky Puppy, Culcha Vulcha, Best Contemporary Instrumental Album
- 2017 Emerging Jazz Artist Award, Toronto Arts Foundation
- 2019 JUNO Award (Nominated), In the Moment, Jazz Album of the Year: Solo
