= Snarky Puppy =

American jazz ensemble

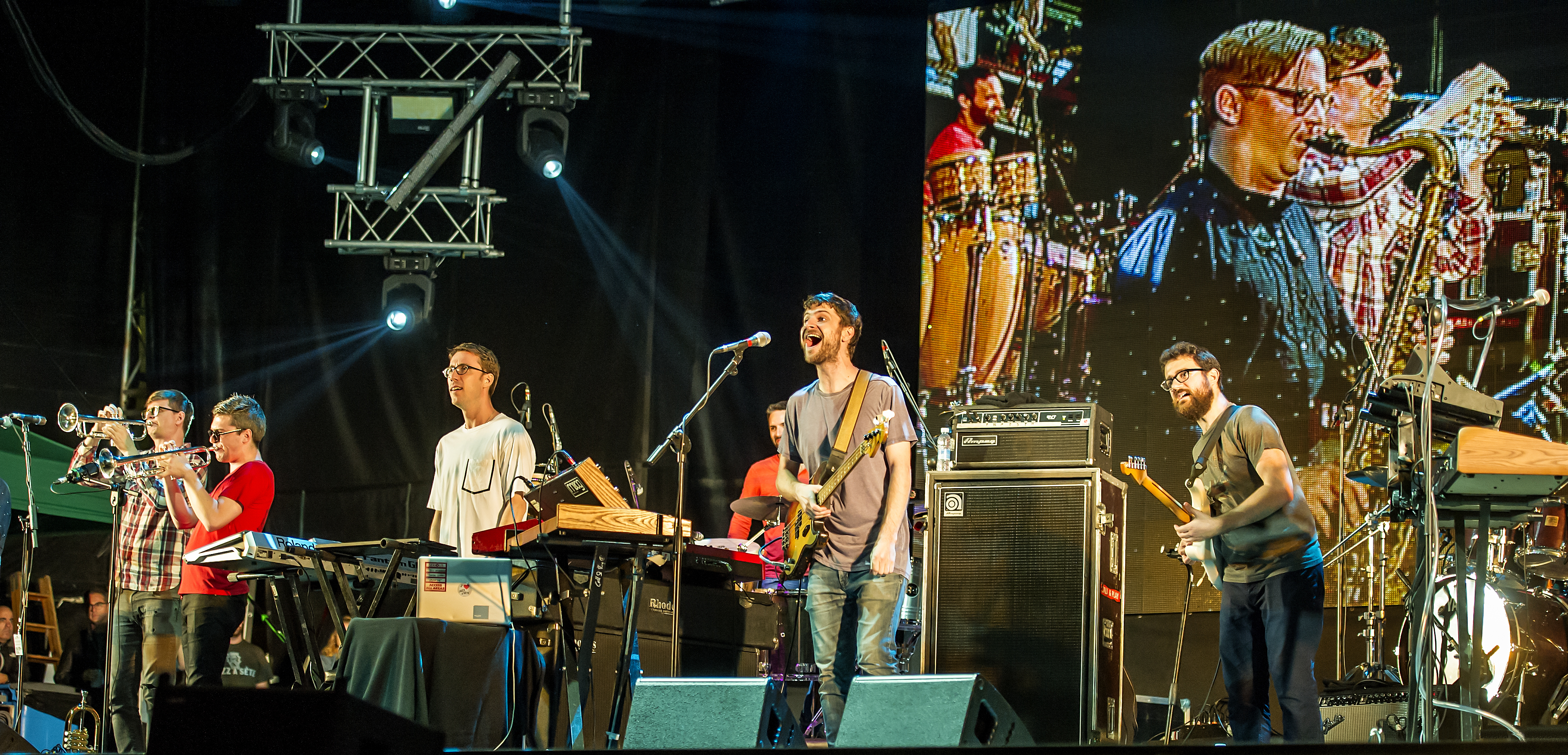
- Snarky Puppy performing at Heineken Jazzaldia in a 2016 concert

Background information
- Origin: Denton, Texas, United States
- Genres: Jazz, funk, fusion, pop, rock, world
- Years active: 2004–present
- Labels: Sitmom; Ropeadope; groundUPmusic; Universal Music Classics; Impulse!
- Spinoffs: Forq; Ghost-Note; Bokanté
- Website: snarkypuppy.com

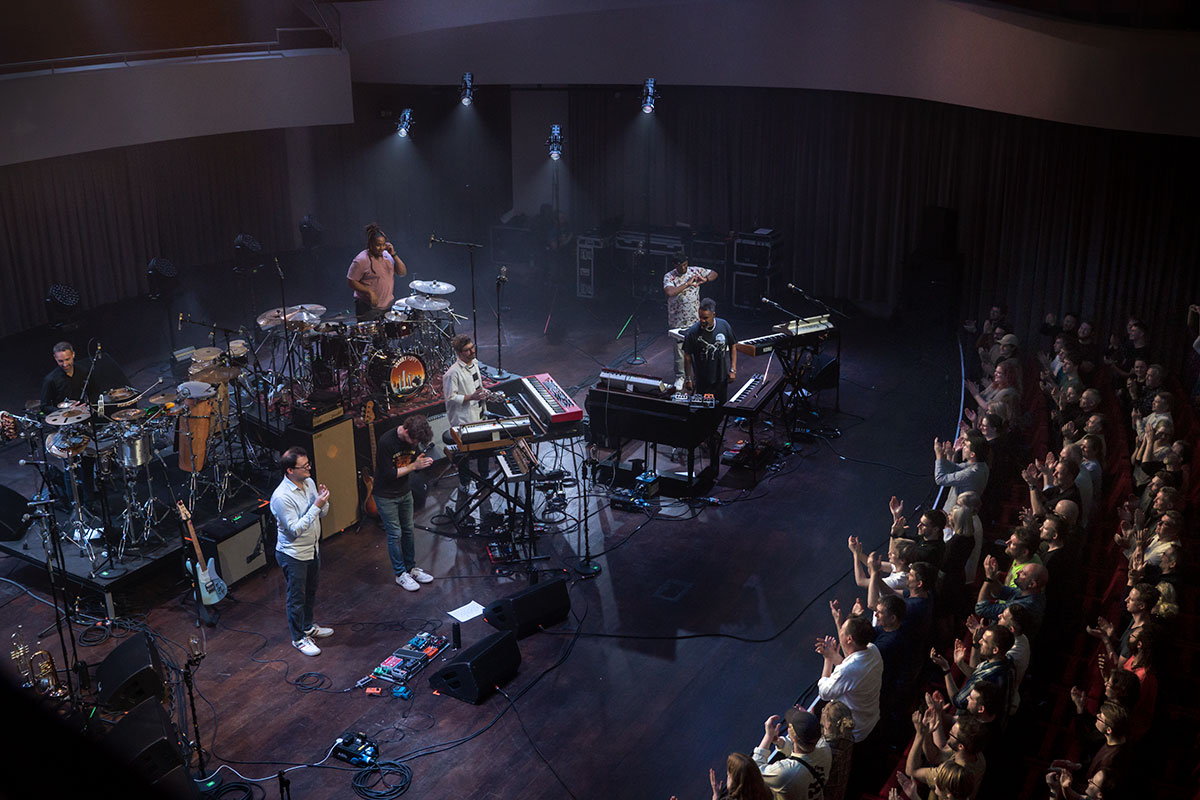
In Aalborg, Denmark (2022)

Snarky Puppy is an American jazz fusion band led by bassist Michael League. Founded in 2004, Snarky Puppy combines a variety of jazz idioms, rock, world music, and funk and has won five Grammy Awards. Although the band has worked with vocalists, League described Snarky Puppy as "a pop band that improvises a lot, without vocals".

== History ==
The band was formed as a 10-piece group by Michael League in Denton, Texas, after his second year at the University of North Texas, in 2004. "Because I was so bad," he claimed, "I didn't place into any of the school ensembles. So Snarky Puppy was my way of getting to play." The group has grown into an international superband comprising "...a wide-ranging assemblage of musicians known affectionately as 'The Fam'." In the more than twenty years since its founding, approximately 40 players have performed in "The Fam" on guitar, bass, keyboards, woodwinds, brass, strings, drums, and percussion, but six of the 10 members on the first studio album, The Only Constant, remain on the regular roster. Many past and present band members were students at the University of North Texas.

Members have performed with Erykah Badu, Marcus Miller, Justin Timberlake, Stanley Clarke, Kirk Franklin, Ari Hoenig, Roy Hargrove, David Crosby, Michael McDonald, Snoop Dogg, The 1975 and many other artists. While touring, the band has given clinics, workshops, and master classes in North America, South America, Europe, Asia, and Australia. Most members either lead or are primary players in other working recording bands.

In 2005, League self-released the band's unofficial first album, Live at Uncommon Ground. Snarky Puppy's next three albums were released independently, after which Tell Your Friends, groundUP, Family Dinner – Volume 1, and We Like It Here were released on the band's GroundUP imprint on Ropeadope.

The album We Like It Here was performed and recorded live in October 2013 at the artistic compound Kytopia in Utrecht, Netherlands.

On January 26, 2014, Snarky Puppy and vocalist Lalah Hathaway won a Grammy Award in the Best R&B Performance category for their rendition of the Brenda Russell song "Something" from Family Dinner – Volume 1. Sylva debuted at number one on the Billboard magazine Heatseekers Chart, the Jazz Album chart, and the Contemporary Jazz Album chart. The album won the 2016 Grammy Award for Best Contemporary Instrumental Album. The album Culcha Vulcha (2016) won the 2017 Grammy Award for Best Contemporary Instrumental Album. Friday 26 April 2019, the band released the first bonus track from Immigrance. Immigrance is the latest evolution of the band as League noted to David Browne in Rolling Stone: "We’re more into setting up nice grooves that we like and sitting with things a bit longer."

Although the band had recorded several albums with a small audience of friends, family, and guests in the studio with them, its first true "live, in-concert" album was Live at the Royal Albert Hall, recorded before a sold-out crowd at the historic London venue. The album won the 2021 Grammy Award for Best Contemporary Instrumental Album.

A second "live, in-concert" album, Live at GroundUP Music Festival, was released in the spring of 2022, consisting of a single performance from each of the GroundUP Music Festival's first four iterations.

In March 2022, the band recorded their album Empire Central at the Deep Ellum Art Company in Dallas, Texas. The album won the 2023 Grammy Award for Best Contemporary Instrumental Album.

== Label ==
With the release of the album GroundUP in 2012, Snarky Puppy started its own imprint, GroundUP Music, on Ropeadope Records. It was inspired by the idea of helping lesser-known artists capitalize on Snarky Puppy's growing fanbase. In 2016, GroundUP Music left Ropeadope and partnered with Universal Music for three years of releases and is now a fully independent label. It has released albums by David Crosby, Snarky Puppy, Becca Stevens, Bokanté, Banda Magda, Alina Engibaryan, Charlie Hunter, Breastfist, Sirintip, Mark Lettieri, House of Waters, PRD Mais, Roosevelt Collier, Forq, Lucy Woodward, The Funky Knuckles, Michelle Willis, Cory Henry, Justin Stanton, Bill Laurance, and Maz.

== GroundUP Music Festival ==
In 2017, the GroundUP Music Festival, also known as GUMFest, debuted within the grounds of the North Beach Band Shell in North Beach, Miami. The first GroundUP Music Festival was initiated by Andy Hurwitz, directed by Paul Lehr, and artistically directed by Michael League. The festival features performances by Snarky Puppy all three nights, with a line-up curated by League that has featured Michael McDonald, Cecile McLorin Salvant, David Crosby, Béla Fleck and the Flecktones, The Wood Brothers, Robert Glasper, Knower, Concha Buika, C4 Trio, Pedrito Martinez, Jojo Mayer + Nerve, Mark Guiliana's Beat Music, John Medeski's Mad Skillet, Charlie Hunter Trio, Laura Mvula, Eliades Ochoa, Esperanza Spalding, Lionel Loueke, Joshua Redman, Terence Blanchard, Christian Scott aTunde Adjuah, Maro, and Brian Blade and the Fellowship Band as well as the full GroundUP Music roster, among others. Through February 2020 (and prior to the effects of the COVID-19 pandemic), GroundUP Music Festival, Miami, had become an annual event.

In 2025, the GroundUP Music Festival was held in Alberobello, Italy for the first time, featuring performances by Italian musicians alongside Snarky Puppy and several other American artists. It was held there in 2026 and will return to the same venue in 2027.

== Band members ==
Snarky Puppy is sometimes referred to as a "collective". The band's current roster boasts about 20 members, and well over 40 musicians have performed with the group over the years and through the group's 14 albums. Michael League explains that, in the early days of the original 10-piece band, if someone got an opportunity to earn more money than for the band's gig, "...we'd get a substitute and if the substitute played well, then it felt like, 'Well, they learned the music and played great, what a waste for them to learn all that for one gig...' so we would kind of just keep them in the Rolodex, so to speak, and rotate them in and out. Then it became a thing where we started touring so much that guys couldn't do all the dates, or didn't want to, or whatever." When people came in, the differences in their playing would influence all those on the date. "That would change the way that they played the music. And then even when that new person left, that memory of that new relationship with the music would remain. So really we just kept building on the personalities of the new people that would come in, brick by brick. ...in general, the guys understand what the band is – a rotating cast... But I don't really think of Snarky Puppy as a collective. It's just a large band and sometimes people aren't there. It doesn't feel like a revolving door, it doesn't feel anonymous at all. The guys who have played gigs with us the least have still played several hundred gigs. That's more than most people play with their own bands. So it's very much a tight, familial unit. Everyone feels very, very close and very essential, also."

Members listed on the liner notes of the album Somni (2025):

- Bob Lanzetti – electric guitar
- Mark Lettieri – electric guitar, baritone guitar
- Chris McQueen – electric guitar
- Michael League – electric bass, Minimoog Model D bass
- Zach Brock – violin
- Chris Bullock – tenor saxophone, soprano saxophone, bass clarinet, flute, piccolo
- Bob Reynolds – tenor saxophone, soprano saxophone
- Jay Jennings – trumpet, flugelhorn
- Mike "Maz" Maher – trumpet, flugelhorn
- Justin Stanton – trumpet, Wurlitzer, Prophet 10, Minimoog Model D
- Bill Laurance – Fender Rhodes Mark 8, Yamaha CP70, Minimoog Model D
- Bobby Sparks II – Hammond B3 organ, ARP String Ensemble, Minimoog Model D, Hohner D6 Clavinet
- Nikki Glaspie – drum set, wordless vocals
- Larnell Lewis – drum set, wordless vocals
- Jamison Ross – drum set, wordless vocals
- Jason "JT" Thomas – drum set
- Mason Davis – percussion
- Keita Ogawa – percussion
- Nate Werth – percussion
- Marcelo Woloski – percussion

Keyboardist Shaun Martin died on August 3, 2024, from complications following a stroke.

== Awards and honors ==
- 2013 Grammy Award for Best R&B Performance, "Something"
- 2013 Best Electric/Jazz-Rock/Contemporary Group/Artist, JazzTimes Readers' Poll
- 2013 Best New Artist, JazzTimes Readers' Poll
- 2015 Best Electric/Jazz-Rock/Contemporary Group/Artist, JazzTimes Critic' Poll
- 2015 Grammy Award for Best Contemporary Instrumental Album, Sylva
- 2015 Jazz Group of the Year, DownBeat Readers' Poll
- 2016 Jazz Group of the Year, DownBeat Readers' Poll
- 2016 Best Electric/Jazz-Rock/Contemporary Group/Artist, JazzTimes Readers' Poll
- 2016 Grammy Award for Best Contemporary Instrumental Album, Culcha Vulcha
- 2017 Best Electric/Jazz-Rock/Contemporary Group/Artist, JazzTimes Readers' Poll
- 2017 Jazz Group of the Year, DownBeat Readers' Poll
- 2018 Best Electric/Jazz-Rock/Contemporary Group/Artist, JazzTimes Readers' Poll
- 2019 Jazz Group of the Year, DownBeat Readers' Poll
- 2021 Grammy Award for Best Contemporary Instrumental Album, Live At The Royal Albert Hall
- 2023 Grammy Award for Best Contemporary Instrumental Album, Empire Central

== Discography ==
Studio albums († = with audience in the studio)

- The Only Constant (Sitmom, 2006)
- The World Is Getting Smaller (Sitmom, 2007)
- Bring Us the Bright (Sitmom, 2008)
- Tell Your Friends (Ropeadope, 2010) †
- groundUP (GroundUP, 2012) †
- We Like It Here (Ropeadope, 2014) †
- Sylva with Metropole Orkest (Impulse!, 2015) †
- Culcha Vulcha (GroundUP, 2016)
- Immigrance (GroundUP, 2019)
- Empire Central (GroundUP, 2022) †
- Somni with Metropole Orkest (GroundUP, 2025) †

Live recordings

- Live at Uncommon Ground (self-release, 2005)
- Live at the Royal Albert Hall (GroundUP, 2020)
- Live at GroundUP Music Festival (GroundUP/Spotify, 2022)
- Live at Band on the Wall (GroundUpMusic / Band on the Wall, RSD 2024)

Albums with guest artists

- Family Dinner – Volume 1 (Ropeadope, 2013)
- Family Dinner – Volume 2 (GroundUP, Universal Music Classics, 2016)

Backing band

- Amkeni with Bukuru Celestin (Ropeadope, 2013)
