= Jamison Ross =

American jazz drummer and vocalist (born 1987)

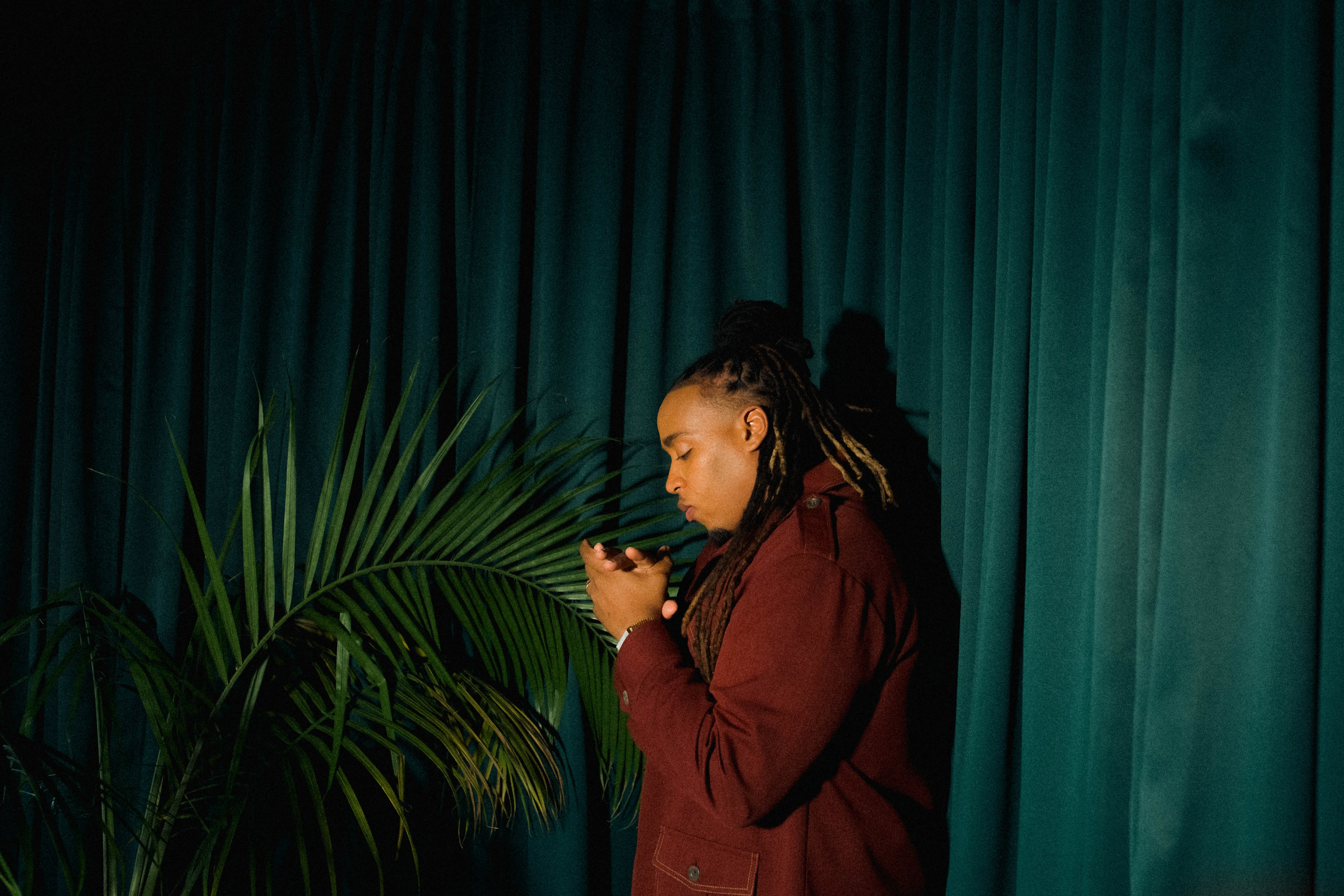
- Ross in 2022

Background information
- Born: November 12, 1987 (age 38); Jacksonville, Florida, U.S.
- Genres: Jazz
- Occupations: Singer, songwriter, drummer, composer, producer
- Years active: 2007–present
- Label: Concord Jazz
- Website: jamisonrossmusic.com

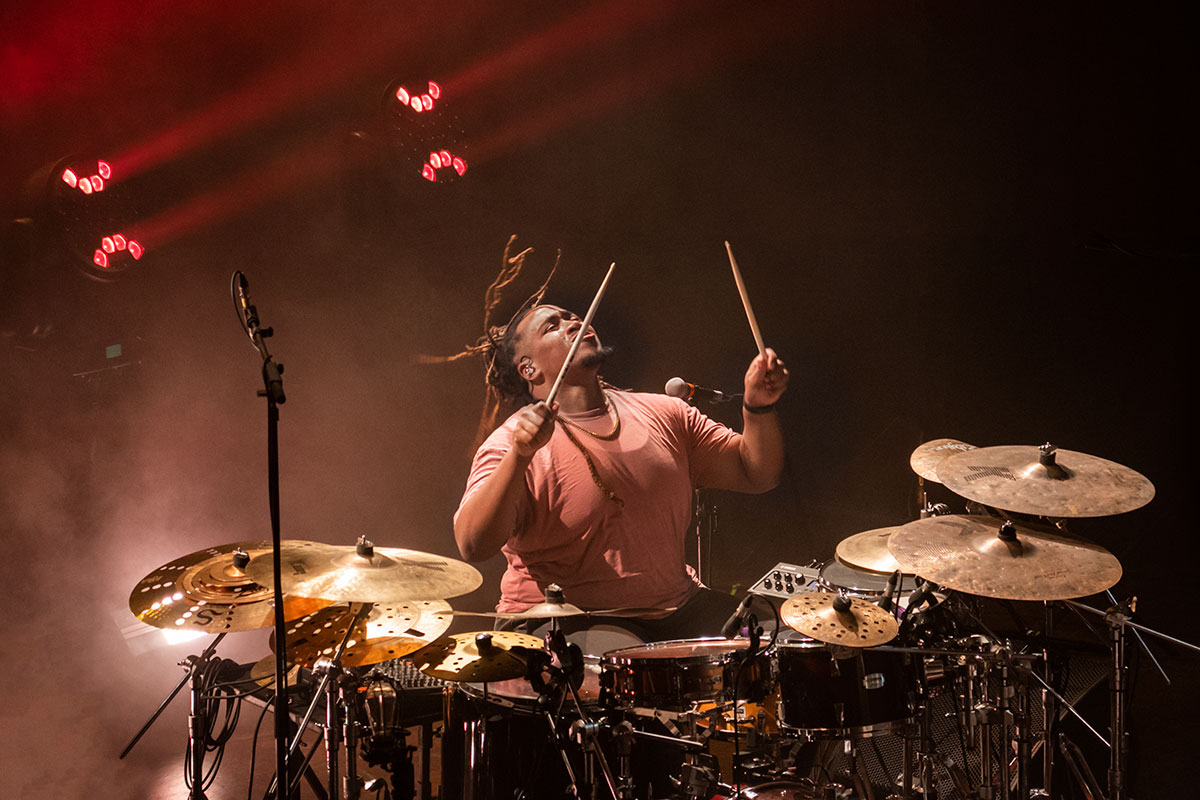
Ross performing with Snarky Puppy in Aalborg, Denmark (2022)

Jamison Ross (born November 12, 1987) is an American jazz drummer and vocalist, singer, songwriter, and producer. He was the winner of the 2012 Thelonious Monk Institute of Jazz International Competition for drums.

== Career ==
A native of Jacksonville, Florida, Jamison sang and played drums at his grandfather's church. He studied music at Douglas Anderson High School and at Florida State University where he earned a Bachelor of Arts in Jazz Studies. He attended the University of New Orleans where he earned a Master of Music.

His career began during high school after appearing in the 2007 documentary Chops. In 2009, he was invited to the Betty Carter Jazz Ahead Residency at the Kennedy Center in Washington, D.C. During this program, he met singer Carmen Lundy, who invited him to join her band. He recorded with Lundy on her albums Changes and Soul to Soul.

On June 23, 2015, Concord Jazz released Ross's debut album, which was recorded at Esplanade Studios in New Orleans. The album includes a guest appearance by Jon Batiste, former bandleader for the Late Show with Stephen Colbert. The album received a nomination for Best Jazz Vocal Album at the 58th Grammy Awards.

On June 23, 2015, Ross released his debut album, Jamison, on Concord Jazz. His sophomore album, All For One, was released on January 26, 2018.

== Awards and honors ==
- Won the Thelonious Monk Institute of Jazz International Competition for drums, 2012
- Mentioned by Vanity Fair magazine
- Produced the GRAMMY-nominated song "Let Me Go" by Mykal Kilgore

== Discography ==
=== As leader ===
- Jamison (Concord Jazz, 2015)
- All for One (Concord Jazz, 2018)

=== As sideman ===
| Release year | Artist | Album | Label |
|---|---|---|---|
| 2012 | Darius Paulk | Lyrics & Melodies | Darius Paulk |
| 2012 | Carmen Lundy | Changes | Afrasia |
| 2013 | Rex Gregory | Rocket Summer | Rex Gregory |
| 2013 | Bill Peterson | Ruby Diamond | Summit |
| 2013 | Clarence Johnson | Watch Him Work | Like Father Like Son |
| 2014 | Meachum L. Clarke & True Purpose | Greater | True Purpose |
| 2014 | Cindy Scott | Historia | Catahoula |
| 2014 | Carmen Lundy | Soul to Soul | Afrasia |
| 2014 | Dr. John | Ske-Dat-De-Dat: The Spirit of Satch | Proper/Concord |
| 2014 | Glen David Andrews | Redemption | Louisiana Red Hot |
| 2015 | Barry Stephenson | Basic Truths | Independent |
| 2015 | Irvin Mayfield | New Orleans Jazz Playhouse | Basin Street |
| 2016 | NOLA w/Snarky Puppy | Family Dinner – Volume 2 | Ropeadope |
| 2019 | Snarky Puppy | Immigrance | GroundUp |
| 2022 | Snarky Puppy | Live at GroundUP Music Festival | GroundUp |
| 2022 | Snarky Puppy | Empire Central | GroundUp |

== Filmography ==
| Year | Title | Role | Production company |
|---|---|---|---|
| 2007 | CHOPS | Featured performer | Virgil Films & Entertainment |
| 2014 | Wynton Marsalis: A YoungArts Master Class | Featured performer | HBO |
| 2016 | Snarky Puppy: Family Dinner Vol. 2 | Featured performer | |
