= We Like It Here =

Studio album by Snarky Puppy
- Released: February 25, 2014
- Recorded: October 2013
- Studios: Kytopia Studios, Utrecht, Netherlands
- Genre: Jazz fusion
- Length: 54:38
- Label: Ropeadope

Snarky Puppy chronology
Family Dinner – Volume 1 (2013)	We Like It Here (2014)	Sylva (2015)

We Like It Here is an album by American jazz fusion group Snarky Puppy that was released on February 25, 2014.

== Description ==
Recorded and filmed live with a studio audience over four nights in the Netherlands, We Like It Here captures the band at its most explorative point in its career, in both composition and improvisation. The film created alongside the album (included in the CD/DVD combo, and on Snarky Puppy's YouTube page) also contains over an hour of interviews, behind the scenes tour footage in Europe, and alternate solo takes from the recording sessions. The track "Lingus" includes a well-regarded solo on the synthesizer by Cory Henry.

== Track listing ==
All tracks are written by Michael League except where noted.

No.	Title	Length
1.	"Shofukan"	6:33
2.	"What About Me?"	6:42
3.	"Sleeper" (Mike Maher)	6:51
4.	"Jambone" (League, Bob Lanzetti)	5:07
5.	"Kite"	6:12
6.	"Outlier" (Justin Stanton)	6:45
7.	"Tio Macaco"	5:43
8.	"Lingus"	10:45
Total length:		54:38

== Personnel ==
- Michael League – bass guitar, Moog bass
- Mike Maher – trumpet, flugelhorn
- Jay Jennings – trumpet, flugelhorn
- Chris Bullock – tenor saxophone, bass clarinet, flute
- Bob Reynolds – tenor saxophone
- Yannick Hiwat – violin
- Tessel Hersbach – violin
- Mara Tieles – viola
- Susanne Rosmolen – cello
- Bill Laurance – piano, keyboards
- Justin Stanton – keyboards, trumpet
- Cory Henry – keyboards
- Shaun Martin – Moog talkbox, keyboards
- Bob Lanzetti – electric guitar
- Mark Lettieri – electric guitar
- Chris McQueen – electric guitar, baritone guitar
- Larnell Lewis – drums
- Julio Pimental – percussion (tracks 4 and 7)
- Steven Brezet – percussion (tracks 4 and 7)
- Nate Werth – percussion
