= Bring Us the Bright =

Studio album by Snarky Puppy
- Released: 2008
- Recorded: April 2008
- Genres: Jazz, pop, rock
- Length: 49:04
- Label: Ropeadope

Snarky Puppy chronology
The World Is Getting Smaller (2007)	Bring Us the Bright (2008)	Tell Your Friends (2010)

Bring Us the Bright is an album by American jazz fusion group Snarky Puppy that was released in 2008.

== Track listing ==
All tracks are written by Michael League except where noted.

No.	Title	Writer(s)	Length
1.	"Bring Us the Bright"		6:36
2.	"Loose Screws"	Robert Searight	4:20
3.	"Strawman"		8:27
4.	"34 Klezma"	Bill Laurance	6:14
5.	"Strange Dream"	Brian Donohoe	5:21
6.	"Celebrity"		6:28
7.	"Making the Circle"	Brian Donohoe	6:47
8.	"And Soon We'll Be One"		4:51
Total length:			49:04

== Personnel ==
- Michael League – bass guitar, double bass, vocals
- Mike Maher – trumpet, vocals
- Sara Jacovino – trombone, vocals (Tracks 1,2,3,6 & 7)
- Clay Pritchard – tenor saxophone (Track 6)
- Chris Bullock – tenor saxophone (Tracks 1,2,3,4,6 & 7)
- Brian Donohoe – tenor saxophone, alto saxophone, vocals (Tracks 1,2,3,6 & 7)
- Mark Lettieri – electric guitar (Track 3)
- Chris McQueen – electric guitar, acoustic guitar, vocals
- Bob Lanzetti – electric guitar, vocals
- William Barnes – pedal steel guitar, dobro (Track 1)
- "Leftthand" Kevin Williams – bass (Track 2)
- Bernard Wright– keyboards (Tracks 3,5,6 & 7)
- Bobby Sparks – keyboards (Tracks 2,3,5,6 & 7)
- Bill Laurance – keyboards, piano, vocals
- Justin Stanton – keyboards (tracks 1,5 & 6), trumpet (Tracks 1,2,3,5,6,7 & 8)
- Zach Brock – violin (Tracks 1,4 & 8)
- Veronika Vassileva – viola (Tracks 1,4 & 8)
- Michelle Cho – cello (Tracks 1,4 & 8)
- Robert Searight – drums, keyboards (Tracks 1,2,3,5 & 7)
- Steve Pruitt – drums, vocals (Tracks 1,2,4,5,7 & 8)
- Nate Werth – percussion
- Jorge Ginorio – percussion (Track 2)
- José Aponte – percussion, vocals (Track 2)
- Mikal Evans – vocals (Track 1)
- Michelle Aponte – vocals (Track 2)
- Jomar Ginorio – "kid noises" (Track 2)
