= Tell Your Friends (Snarky Puppy album) =

Studio album by Snarky Puppy
- Released: 2010
- Recorded: November 21, 2009
- Studios: Dockside Studio, Maurice, Louisiana
- Genre: Jazz fusion
- Length: 49:02
- Label: Ropeadope

Snarky Puppy chronology
Bring Us the Bright (2008)	Tell Your Friends (2010)	groundUP (2012)

Tell Your Friends is an album by American jazz fusion group Snarky Puppy that was released in 2010.

== Track listing ==
No.	Title	Length
1.	"Whitecap" (League)	8:28
2.	"Flood" (League)	9:10
3.	"The Good Man Deliver and the Best Is Blessed" (Laurance)	7:20
4.	"Skate U" (Maher)	6:54
5.	"Slow Demon" (League)	8:06
6.	"Ready Wednesday" (Laurance)	9:04

The album was scheduled to be released on vinyl in 2020. It was discovered that the original mix was absent from the hard drive where it was supposed to be stored. Thus, the entire album was remixed and remastered, with two additional tracks included.

No.	Title	Length
7.	"Anomynous" (Lanzetti)	6:27
8.	"The Little People" (Searight)	5:00

== Personnel ==
- Michael League – bass guitar, keybass
- Jay Jennings – trumpet, flugelhorn
- Mike Maher – trumpet
- Chris Bullock – tenor saxophone
- Ian Rapien – tenor saxophone
- Zach Brock – violin
- Eylem Basildi – violin
- Roni Gan – violin (Track 5)
- Shawna Hamilton – cello
- Bill Laurance – piano, keyboards
- Shaun Martin – keyboards
- Justin Stanton – keyboards
- Bob Lanzetti – electric guitar
- Mark Lettieri – electric guitar
- Chris McQueen – electric & acoustic guitars
- Robert "Sput" Searight – drums
- Nate Werth – percussion
- Taron Lockett – drums (Tracks 1 & 3)
