= GroundUP (album) =

groundUP

Live album by Snarky Puppy
- Released: 27 March 2012
- Recorded: December 14 – 16, 2011
- Studios: Shapeshifter Lab, Brooklyn, New York
- Genre: Jazz fusion
- Length: 54:58
- Label: Ropeadope

Snarky Puppy chronology
Tell Your Friends (2010)	groundUP (2012)	Amkeni (2013)

GroundUP (stylised groundUP) is an album by American jazz fusion group Snarky Puppy that was released in 2012. The album was recorded live at Shapeshifter Lab in Brooklyn, New York, in front of a studio audience.

== Track listing ==
All tracks are written by Michael League except where noted.

No.	Title	Length
1.	"Thing of Gold"	6:25
2.	"Bent Nails" (Robert Searight)	5:03
3.	"Minjor"	5:24
4.	"Binky"	9:38
5.	"Mr. Montauk" (Justin Stanton)	5:53
6.	"Like a Light"	4:48
7.	"Young Stuff"	9:02
8.	"Quarter Master"	8:45
Total length:		54:58

== Personnel ==
- Michael League – bass guitar, keybass
- Andy Hunter – trombone
- Jay Jennings – trumpet, flugelhorn
- Mike Maher – trumpet, flugelhorn
- Chris Bullock – tenor saxophone
- Bill Laurance – keyboards
- Cory Henry – keyboards
- Shaun Martin – keyboards
- Justin Stanton – keyboards, trumpet
- Mark Lettieri – electric guitar
- Bob Lanzetti – electric guitar, baritone guitar
- Chris McQueen – electric guitar, baritone guitar
- Nate Werth – percussion
- Keita Ogawa – percussion
- Marcelo Woloski – percussion
- Robert "Sput" Searight – drums
- Zach Brock – violin
- Eylem Bisaldi – violin
- Maria Im – violin
- Roni Gan – viola
- Jody Redhage – cello
