= Family Dinner – Volume 2 =

Studio album by Snarky Puppy
- Released: February 12, 2016
- Recorded: 2015
- Studio: Esplanade Studios, New Orleans, Louisiana
- Genre: Jazz fusion
- Length: 56:54 (CD); 87:16 (digital)
- Label: groundUP

Snarky Puppy chronology
Sylva (2015)	Family Dinner – Volume 2 (2016)	Culcha Vulcha (2016)

Professional ratings
Review scores
Source	Rating
The Irish Times	4/5 stars
The Guardian	4/5 stars

Family Dinner – Volume 2 is an album by American jazz fusion group Snarky Puppy that was released on February 12, 2016.

== Track listing ==
All songs arranged by Michael League.

No.	Title	Length
1.	"I Asked" (featuring Becca Stevens & Väsen)	6:54
2.	"Molino Molero" (featuring Susana Baca & Charlie Hunter)	5:30
3.	"Liquid Love" (featuring Chris Turner)	6:36
4.	"Soro (Afriki)" (featuring Salif Keita, Carlos Malta & Bernardo Aguiar)	8:17
5.	"Sing to the Moon" (featuring Laura Mvula & Michelle Willis)	5:51
6.	"Don't You Know" (featuring Jacob Collier & Big Ed Lee)	10:44
7.	"I Remember" (featuring Knower & Jeff Coffin)	6:34
8.	"Somebody Home" (featuring David Crosby)	6:30

=== Bonus DVD and digital download tracks ===
No.	Title	Length
1.	"Be Still" (featuring Becca Stevens & Väsen)	4:33
2.	"Fuego y Agua" (featuring Susana Baca)	5:36
3.	"Shapons Vindaloo" (featuring Väsen)	8:04
4.	"One Hope" (featuring Knower)	3:31
5.	"Brother, I'm Hungry" (featuring Nigel Hall & NOLA International)	8:36

== Personnel ==
- Michael League – bass guitar, ukulele bass, Moog bass, & vocals
- Jay Jennings – trumpet, flugelhorn, vocals
- Mike Maher – trumpet, flugelhorn, vocals
- Chris Bullock – tenor saxophone, flute, alto flute, vocals
- Cory Henry – keyboards, vocals
- Bill Laurance – keyboards, vocals
- Shaun Martin – keyboards, vocals
- Justin Stanton – keyboards, trumpet, vocals
- Bob Lanzetti – guitars, vocals
- Mark Lettieri – guitars, vocals
- Chris McQueen – guitars, vocals
- Robert Searight – drums, vocals
- Larnell Lewis – drums, percussion, vocals
- Nate Werth – percussion, vocals
- Marcelo Woloski – percussion, vocals
- Rachella Searight – vocals
- Candy West – vocals
- Peaches West – vocals

Guests

- Ed Lee – sousaphone
- Carlos Malta – pife, bass flute, alto flute, flute, & soprano sax
- Jeff Coffin – tenor sax, alto flute
- Jacob Collier – vocals, piano, harmonizer
- Michelle Willis – pump organ & vocals
- Charlie Hunter – guitar
- David Crosby – vocals, acoustic guitar
- Roger Tallroth (Väsen) – parlor guitar, 12-string acoustic guitar
- Louis Cole (Knower) – drums
- Olov Johansson (Väsen) – nyckelharpa
- Bernardo Aguiar – pandeiro, percussion
- André Ferrari (Väsen) – percussion
- Carolina Araoz – vocals
- Genevieve Artadi (Knower) – vocals
- Susana Baca – vocals
- Amos Gohi Baraon – vocals
- Aminata Dante – vocals
- Salif Keita – vocals
- Bah Kouyate-Kone – vocals
- Laura Mvula – vocals
- Becca Stevens – vocals, acoustic guitar, charango
- Chris Turner – vocals

Nola International

- Sam Williams – trombone
- Terence Blanchard – trumpet
- Khris Royal – alto saxophone
- John Gros – organ
- Brian Coogan – piano, vocals
- Ivan Neville – clavinet, vocals
- Big D Perkins – electric guitar
- Donald Ramsey – bass guitar
- Jamison Ross – drums
- Terence Higgins – drums
- Mike Dillon – percussion
- Jason Marsalis – percussion
- Nigel Hall – vocals

== Charts ==
Chart (2016)	Peak position
Dutch Albums (Album Top 100)	58
French Albums (SNEP)	149
