= Bill Laurance =

English musician (born 1981)

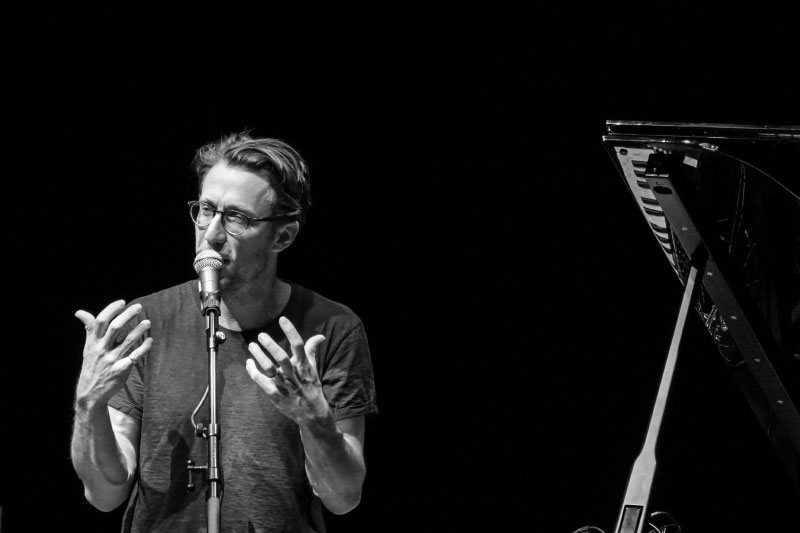
- Laurance in Denmark in 2020

Background information
- Born: 2 April 1981 (age 45); London, England, UK
- Genres: Jazz, classical, electronic, fusion
- Occupations: Musician, composer, arranger, producer
- Instruments: Piano, keyboard
- Years active: 1995–present
- Labels: GroundUP Music, Flint Music, ACT Music
- Member of: Snarky Puppy
- Website: billlaurance.com

Bill Laurance (born 2 April 1981) is an English composer, producer, and multi-instrumental musician. Laurance is a member of jazz fusion and funk band Snarky Puppy, as well as founder and CEO of London-based record label Flint Music.

== Biography ==
Bill Laurance was born on 2 April 1981 and raised in North London, England. As a child he attended William Tyndale primary school, during which he began learning piano and playing with his school band. At age 9 Laurance performed on organ during a school trip to London's renowned live-music venue Union Chapel, a locale he would later again perform at as an adult during the recording of his fourth studio album Live at Union Chapel. Having been trained on ragtime and swing, Laurance first began playing jazz at the age of 14 when he became the resident performer for a small restaurant in the Soho district on the West End of London. As an adult Laurance attended and graduated from the University of Leeds, studying classical music, composition, and performance.

During his tenure at Leeds, Laurance met traveling University of North Texas jazz student Michael League, the two going on to perform a number of shows together in the UK. It was here that League and Laurance became close friends. League subsequently invited Laurance to join jazz ensemble Snarky Puppy before the recording of the group's first studio album. With Snarky Puppy's first album The Only Constant releasing in 2006, it wasn't until 2014 when Laurance would go on to release his first solo album Flint.

Laurance is also an artist in residency at Morley College and has taught master classes as a visiting lecturer with The Institute of Contemporary Music Performance.

== Film composition ==
Laurance was a 2018 participant of the Sundance Institute Film Music and Sound Design Lab, taking place at Skywalker Sound in California. His debut feature film score was for Un Traductor (2018), an independent drama by directing brothers Sebastián and Rodrigo Barriuso which was named as Cuba's official entry for the 92nd Academy Awards. Laurance also wrote several themes for Initials S.G. (2019), a film for which co-director and writer Rania Attieh won the 2019 Nora Ephron award at the 2019 Tribeca Film Festival. Laurance has also worked alongside Marcus Eaton as composer for the 2019 documentary David Crosby: Remember My Name.

== Collaborations ==
Laurance frequently collaborated with the guitarist, singer, and songwriter David Crosby. He co-wrote and featured on piano in Crosby's track Your Own Ride, lifted from the 2018 album, Here If You Listen. Laurance is also featured on two tracks from Crosby's 2016 studio album, Lighthouse. Additionally, Laurance provided piano on the recording Somebody Home, dual featured on both Crosby's 2017 album Sky Trails, and Snarky Puppy's 2016 album Family Dinner – Volume 2. In a 2018 interview, Crosby described Laurance as "one of the best piano players I've ever met in my life."

In November 2018, Laurance collaborated with the WDR Big Band of Cologne, performing concerts at Kölner Philharmonie and Southbank's Queen Elizabeth Hall in London. The concert in Cologne was recorded and resulted in a live album consisting of nine Laurance compositions, arranged by bandleader Bob Mintzer.

As a member of Snarky Puppy, Laurance has collaborated with a number of artists and groups, including the Metropole Orkest, with whom the band won a GRAMMY award for the 2016 album, Sylva. As part of their Family Dinner Vol.1 and Family Dinner Vol. 2 albums, Laurance collaborated with artists including Lalah Hathaway (whom he also accompanied at the GroundUP Music Festival in 2019), Salif Keita, Susana Baca, Laura Mvula and Jacob Collier.

== Awards and honors ==
- 2014 - British newspaper The Guardian published an article praising studio album Flint, titling Laurance a "jazz maestro".
- 2014 - Grammy Award for Best R&B Performance as a member of Snarky Puppy for title Something, featuring Lalah Hathaway, from the Snarky Puppy album Family Dinner Volume I
- 2015 - UK digital radio station Jazz FM awarded Laurance as 'Breakthrough Act of the Year'.
- 2016 - Grammy Award for Best Contemporary Instrumental Album as a member of Snarky Puppy for the album Sylva by Snarky Puppy and Metropole Orkest.
- 2017 - Grammy Award for Best Contemporary Instrumental Album as a member of Snarky Puppy for the album Culcha Vulcha by Snarky Puppy.
- 2017 - Online magazine UDiscoverMusic named Laurance's first live album Live at Union Chapel to their 2017 list of 'The 50 Greatest Live Jazz Albums', as well as Snarky Puppy's Sylva with Metropole Orkest.
- 2021 - Grammy Award for Best Contemporary Instrumental Album as a member of Snarky Puppy for the album Live At The Royal Albert Hall by Snarky Puppy.

== Personal views ==
=== Brexit ===
In 2019, while touring in Berlin, Germany, to promote his studio album Cables, Laurance played a completely improvisational piano piece channeling the emotions elicited by the UK electorate's decision to officially withdraw from the European Union (EU), commonly referred to as Brexit. Laurance described the decision to leave the EU and the ensuing political events as "total madness and chaos", stating "It's devastating, the prospect, that [he] as a British person wouldn't be part of Europe." In a related interview with Sam Howson of UK film group Mascot Video, Laurance stated "Everything is about to become more segregated and divided. I believe now, more than ever, we need to celebrate what we have in common over what we don't."

In a 2019 interview with Band on the Wall, Laurance shared "I think now more than ever that it's important to be active about this stuff. There are things I've shied away from in the past, but now I feel like it's part of the responsibility of a musician to raise these things and be more active. It's passivity that has led us to Brexit, Trump... so we have to be more engaged".

=== Technology and science ===
In 2019, Laurance released his fifth solo record Cables which was influenced heavily by technology, science fiction, and science fact. In an interview with David Vincent of BrumNotes magazine, Laurance stated, "I'm fascinated by technology and the speed at which it's growing and I think that it has to be harnessed in some way. If you're dealing in any creative world I think technology, and using technology, is an important part, and has to be an important part, of what we do." Examples of Laurance's passion for science and technology can be found throughout Cables, as many of the songs are inspired, named after, and composed in honour of these subjects.

Track two of Cables, entitled HAL, is named after the fictional artificially intelligent (AI) computer HAL 9000, a character in Stanley Kubrick's 2001: A Space Odyssey. Track four of Cables, entitled Ebb Tide, was inspired by climate change and the fragility of the Earth's now rising sea level. While performing Ebb Tide at Kölner Philharmonie in Cologne, Germany, Laurance stated "Climate change is real." The final and eighth track of Cables, entitled Cassini, is named after the Cassini-Huygens spacecraft, whose mission was to study Saturn. The cadence of the song follows the spacecraft's final mission, commonly referred to as the "Grand Finale", in which the satellite was deliberately sacrificed in order to maximum scientific output while also preventing biological contamination of Saturn's local moons.

=== Climate change ===
Laurance has been vocal about his acceptance of the scientific consensus on anthropogenic climate change. Laurance is amongst the musicians and music organisations who have signed the Music Declares Emergency declaration, which calls for 'an immediate governmental response to protect all life on Earth.' During a 2019 concert at La Petite Halle, Paris, Laurance stated "Climate change is real [...] we have to be more active about it."

== Discography ==
Year	Album details	Peak chart positions		
Year	Album details	US		
Year	Album details	Contemporary Jazz	Jazz	New Age
2014	Flint: Released: 16 May 2014; Label: GroundUP; Formats: CD, digital download	16	33	—
2015	Swift: Released: 27 April 2015; Label: GroundUP; Formats: CD, digital download	10	—	—
2016	Aftersun: Released: 4 March 2016; Label: Universal Classics, GroundUP; Formats: CD, digital download	7	19	—
2016	Live at Union Chapel: Released: 11 November 2016; Label: Universal Classics, GroundUP; Formats: CD, digital download	15	—	—
2019	Cables: Released: 8 March 2019; Label: Flint Music; Formats: CD, digital download	—	—	6
2019	Live at the Philharmonie, Cologne: Released: 8 November 2019; Label: Jazzline; Formats: CD, digital download	—	—	—
2020	Live at Ronnie Scott's: Released: 14 February 2020; Label: Flint Music; Formats: CD, digital download	—	—	—
2020	David Crosby: Remember My Name (Original Score): Released: 21 February 2020; Label: BMG; Formats: Digital download	—	—	—
2021	Cables Rewired: Released: 14 May 2021; Label: Flint Music; Formats: Digital download	—	—	—
2021	Zeal EP: Released: 19 November 2021; Label: Flint Music; Formats: Digital download	—	—	—
2022	Bill Laurance & The Untold Orchestra Live at EFG London Jazz Festival 2021: Released: 3 June 2022; Label: Flint Music; Formats: Digital download	—	—	—
2022	Affinity: Released: 28 October 2022; Label: Flint Music; Formats: Record, digital download	—	—	—
"—" denotes a recording that did not chart or was not released in that territory.

As group member or sideman:

with Eddie Roberts

- Roughneck (Live In Paris) (One Note Records, 2006)
- The Eddie Roberts Quintet Trenta (One Note Records, 2007)
- Eddie Roberts & Freckles Move (One Note Records, 2010)

with Snarky Puppy

- The Only Constant (Sitmom, 2006)
- Bring Us the Bright (Sitmom, 2008)
- Tell Your Friends (Ropeadope, 2010)
- groundUP (GroundUP, 2012)
- Amkeni with Bukuru Celestin (Ropeadope, 2013)
- Family Dinner – Volume 1 (Ropeadope, 2013)
- We Like It Here (Ropeadope, 2014)
- Sylva with Metropole Orkest (Impulse!, 2015)
- Family Dinner – Volume 2 (GroundUP, Universal Music Classics, 2016)
- Culcha Vulcha (GroundUP, 2016)
- Immigrance (GroundUP, 2019)
- Live at the Royal Albert Hall (GroundUP, 2020)

with Gabby Young & Other Animals

- One Foot in Front of the Other (Fontana North/Musebox. 2014)

with David Crosby

- Lighthouse (Decca / GroundUP Music, 2016)
- Sky Trails (BMG, 2017)
- Here If You Listen (BMG, 2018)

with Ana Silvera

- Oracles (Gearbox Records, 2016)

with The Sachal Ensemble

- Song of Lahore (Universal, 2016)

with Michael League

- Where You Wish You Were (ACT Music, 2023)
- Keeping Company (ACT Music. 2023)

with The Untold Orchestra

- Bloom (ACT Music, 2024)

featured on:

- Mad Mats: Digging Beyond the Crates (BBE, 2017)
- Modern Jazz Dance Classics, Vol. 1 (Staubgold, 2019)
