= GroundUPmusic =

GroundUP Music
- Founded: 2012
- Founder: Michael League
- Genre: Jazz, World, Folk, Rock, Gospel
- Country of origin: U.S.
- Location: Brooklyn, NY
- Official website: groundupmusic.net

GroundUP Music is an American record label known for recordings in a variety of genres including jazz, world music, folk, rock, and gospel. The label was founded in 2012 by Michael League as a home for his band Snarky Puppy. The roster of acts on the label has since expanded, with several artists and bands being tied to Snarky Puppy and/or members of that band.

The label also coordinates and sponsors the annual GroundUP Music Festival in Miami Beach, Florida. The February event largely features artists recording with GroundUP Music and acts otherwise associated with GroundUP Music artists.

== Roster of artists ==
Source=

- Snarky Puppy
- Alina Engibaryan
- Becca Stevens
- Bill Laurance
- Bokanté
- Breastfist
- Charlie Hunter
- Cory Henry
- David Crosby
- House of Waters
- FORQ
- Justin Stanton
- Lee Pardini
- Lucy Woodward
- Magda Giannikou & Banda Magda
- Malika Tirolien
- Mark Lettieri
- Michael League
- Michelle Willis
- Mike "Maz" Maher
- Mirrors
- PRD Mais
- Read/McQueen
- Roosevelt Collier
- Sirintip
- The Funky Knuckles
