= Suzie Collier =

British musician

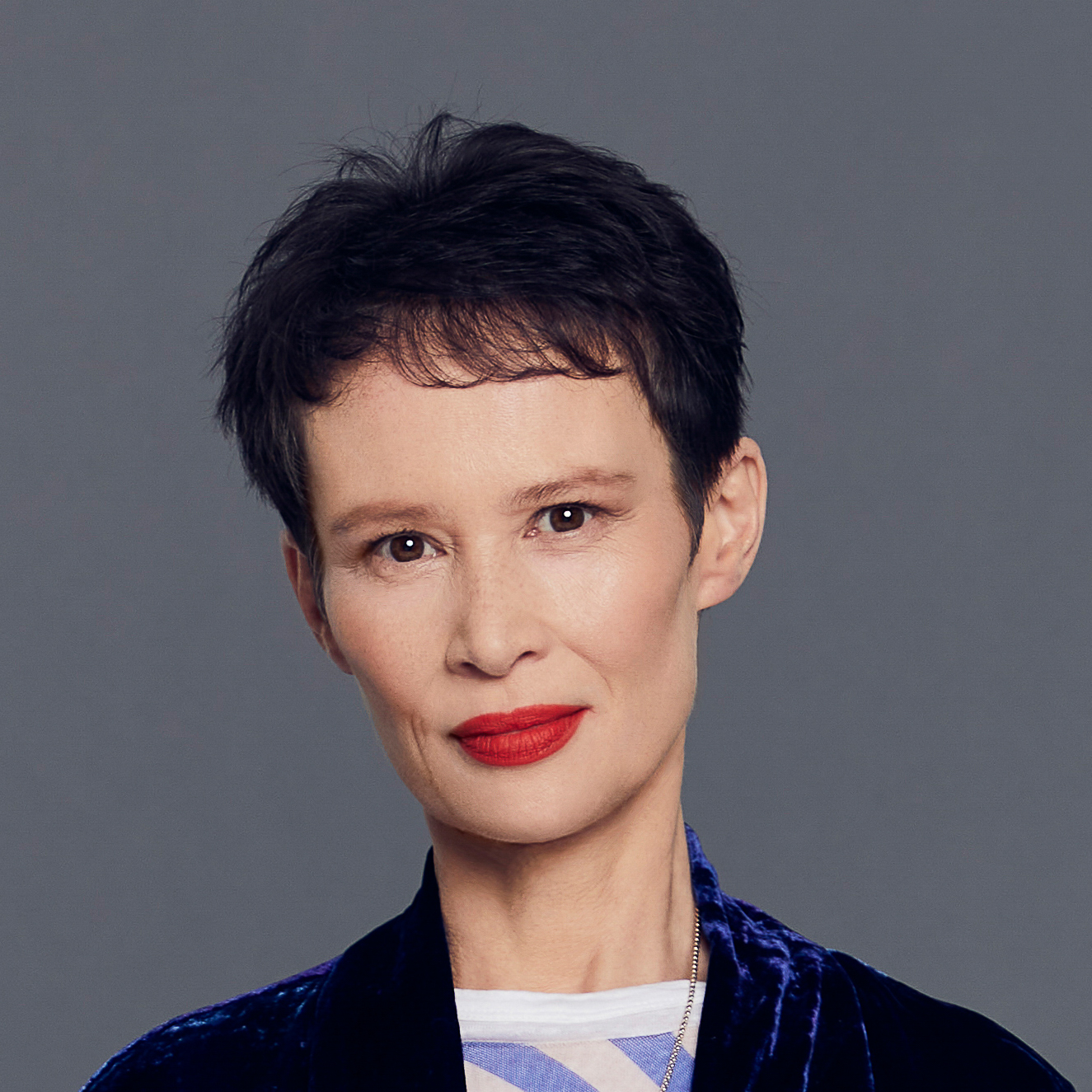

Background information
- Born: 15 June 1964 (age 62)
- Instruments: violin, conducting, teaching
- Years active: 1967-present
- Website: https://www.suziecollier.com/

Susan Collier is a British conductor, violinist, and music educator. She is known for her work with orchestras and musicians worldwide and for collaborating with her son, Jacob Collier. Collier was appointed a Fellow of the Royal Academy of Music in 2021.

== Early life and education ==
Collier was born in London to professional violinists Derek Collier and Lila Wong. She gave her first public performance as a violinist at the age of three. At 18, she received the Sisselle Wray scholarship to study at the Royal Academy of Music, where she was awarded an Associate of the Royal College of Music (ARCM) Violin Performers' Diploma, a Licentiate of the Royal Academy of Music (LRAM) Violin Teachers' Diploma, and a Graduate of the Royal Schools of Music (GRSM) degree, all with Honours.

== Career ==
=== Teaching and mentorship ===
Collier began her teaching career in 1986 as a violin professor at the Junior Department of the Royal Academy of Music. Many of her students have since pursued professional careers in music including Thomas Gould, Mayah Kadish and Francesca Barritt. In recognition of her contribution to the music profession, she was appointed a Fellow of the Royal Academy of Music (FRAM) in 2021.

Additionally, she has given various masterclasses at institutions including the Royal Academy of Music, Guildhall School of Music and Drama, the University of Cambridge, the Massachusetts Institute of Technology in Boston (MIT), Grace Farms, University of Michigan and others.

=== Conductor ===
Collier started conducting in 1987 at The Latymer School in London. From 1988 to 2024, she conducted the Senior Strings Chamber Orchestra at the Royal Academy of Music Junior Department.

She has collaborated with various ensembles and artists, including conducting the recording sessions for Jacob Collier's Djesse Vol. 4 with the Metropole Orkest in Amsterdam and the orchestral version of Stormzy's Firebabe at Abbey Road Studios. In 2023, she was a guest conductor of the Hollywood Bowl Orchestra for Quincy Jones' 90th Birthday Celebration at the Hollywood Bowl.

In January 2025, she conducted the Britten Sinfonia at the Bristol Beacon and the London Barbican. The programme featured soloists Jacob Collier, Chris Thile and Thomas Gould, as well as orchestral works including Anna Meredith’s Nautilus, Danzon no.2 by Arturo Marquez and the premiere of Jacob Collier's first piece for orchestra - Hush Scuffle. More performances followed in 2025 with the Philly Pops, the Nashville Symphony, the Orquesta Filamónia de Gran Canaria and the Ann Arbor Symphony Orchestra featuring Take 6, Chris Thile and Jacob Collier. Collier also conducted the first ever Jacob Collier Audience Orchestra at Davies Symphony Hall in San Francisco, in a concert featuring Jacob Collier and Bobby McFerrin.

=== Violinist ===
Collier has performed internationally as a violinist, collaborating with Jacob Collier at venues including the Hollywood Bowl, the Royal Albert Hall, the Sydney Opera House and the O2 in London. She was a feature soloist in Cecilia McDowall's The Girl from Aleppo at the Barbican Centre, and the concertmaster accompanying the Jason Max Ferdinand Singers' performance at the 2023 American Choral Directors Association (ACDA) National Conference. Collier was a surprise guest on the Jools Holland tour at the Royal Albert Hall, and also on Lawrence's set at Ravinia Festival in 2023, where she featured on their song The Weather.

She is a frequent guest at her son's select concerts, performing duets with him such as Where Is Love? in Toronto in 2022, Isn't She Lovely in Highland Park, Illinois in 2023 or God Only Knows in New York in 2024 among others. Suzie also featured in Jacob's concert at London's O2 Arena in December 2024, playing What A Wonderful World with him.

As a recording artist, she appears as a soloist on Once You from Djesse Vol. 1 and on Gareth Malone’s Notes for Our World (2022).

=== Podcast and digital masterclass ===
During the COVID-19 pandemic, Collier launched Suzie Explores, a digital and in-person initiative focused on creativity and musical exploration. The project includes in-person retreats, a digital masterclass series on Patreon, and her podcast, which has featured guests such as the late Quincy Jones, Yo-Yo Ma, Nicola Benedetti, Chris Thile, TwoSet Violin and Steve Vai.
