= Djesse Vol. 4 =

2024 studio album by Jacob Collier

Studio album by Jacob Collier
- Released: 29 February 2024
- Length: 69:17
- Label: Hajanga
- Producer: Jacob Collier

Jacob Collier chronology
Djesse Vol. 3 (2020)	Djesse Vol. 4 (2024)	The Light for Days (2025)

Singles from Djesse Vol. 4
- 1. "Never Gonna Be Alone" Released: 10 June 2022; 2. "Wellll" Released: 14 July 2023; 3. "Little Blue" Released: 21 September 2023; 4. "Wherever I Go" Released: 27 October 2023; 5. "Witness Me" Released: 21 November 2023; 6. "Mi Corazón" Released: 19 January 2024; 7. "Bridge over Troubled Water" Released: 22 February 2024

Djesse Vol. 4 is the fifth studio album by English musician Jacob Collier, released on 29 February 2024. The album is the fourth and final instalment in the Djesse series, which began in 2018 with Djesse Vol. 1. The album received mixed reviews, with some praising its musical proficiency and others claiming that the project was excessive and overwhelming. At the 67th Annual Grammy Awards, the album received a nomination for Album of the Year. Two of the tracks were also recognized: "Bridge over Troubled Water" won for Best Arrangement, Instrumental or A Cappella, and "A Rock Somewhere" was nominated for Best Global Music Performance.

== Background ==
Jacob Collier first became known for publishing arrangements of popular songs on YouTube in which he performed multiple instruments and layered vocal harmonies. American record producer Quincy Jones contacted Collier after the release of his cover of Stevie Wonder's "Don't You Worry 'bout a Thing" (1974) in 2013, eventually assuming management of his career. Collier recorded and produced his debut album, In My Room (2016), independently. The album was met with a positive reception, including two Grammy Awards. NPR's Ari Shapiro describes Djesse Vol. 4 as the "culmination" of the four-album series starting with Djesse Vol. 1 (2018).

== Promotion and singles ==
"Never Gonna Be Alone", featuring Lizzy McAlpine and John Mayer, was released on 10 June 2022; it was nominated for the Grammy Award for Best Arrangement, Instrumental and Vocals. The song was later revealed to be the first single off Collier's upcoming project Djesse Vol. 4.

"Wellll", the second single, was released on 14 July 2023, alongside a music video featuring Collier on a custom five-string electric guitar. "Little Blue", featuring Brandi Carlile, the third single, was released on 21 September 2023, with its music video. The fourth single, "Wherever I Go", features Lawrence and Michael McDonald and was released on 27 October 2023. The fifth single, "Witness Me", was released on 21 November 2023 and features Shawn Mendes, Stormzy, and Kirk Franklin.

Two new singles were released in early 2024. The sixth single, "Mi Corazón", featuring Camilo, was released on 19 January 2024. The final single, "Bridge over Troubled Water", a cover of a song originally written by Paul Simon for his duo Simon & Garfunkel, featuring vocals by John Legend and Tori Kelly, was released on 22 February. and features uncredited vocals from Yebba.

=== Tour ===
Collier has announced a North American tour to promote the album, which played from April to June 2024.

== Reception ==
Sputnikmusic reported that Djesse Vol. 4 had received unusually divided reactions from audiences; while some listeners applauded the musical proficiency displayed on the work, others shared feelings of "visceral disgust". A Times reviewer commented on the talent Collier shows by combining several genres on the record, but felt that it "begins to feel like showing off" and loses its "charm" through excess. The Observer's Ammar Kalia also noted the wide range of genres represented on the album. Though he felt the dense production could overwhelm many listeners, Kalia found the record "invigorating and irrepressible". The album received a nomination for Album of the Year at the 67th Annual Grammy Awards. Two tracks received nominations as well: "A Rock Somewhere" for Best Global Music Performance and "Bridge over Troubled Water" for Best Arrangement, Instrumental or A Cappella, with the latter winning the award.

== Track listing ==
All tracks are written by Jacob Collier, except where noted. All tracks are produced by Jacob Collier, except "Wherever I Go" (produced by Collier and The Diner).

Djesse Vol. 4 track listing
No.	Title	Writer(s)	Length
1.	"100,000 Voices"	Collier; Arch Echo; Willow Smith	4:44
2.	"She Put Sunshine"		3:30
3.	"Little Blue" (featuring Brandi Carlile)		4:25
4.	"Wellll"	Collier; Remi Wolf	2:38
5.	"Cinnamon Crush" (featuring Lindsey Lomis)	Collier; Lomis	3:47
6.	"Wherever I Go" (featuring Lawrence and Michael McDonald)	Collier; Clyde Lawrence; Gracie Lawrence; Jordan Cohen	2:46
7.	"Summer Rain" (featuring Madison Cunningham and Chris Thile)		4:51
8.	"A Rock Somewhere" (featuring Anoushka Shankar and Varijashree Venugopal)	Collier; Shankar	5:09
9.	"Mi Corazón" (featuring Camilo)	Collier; Camilo Echeverry	3:06
10.	"Witness Me" (featuring Shawn Mendes, Stormzy and Kirk Franklin)	Collier; Mendes; Michael Ebenezer Kwadjo Omari Owuo Jr.; Scott Harris; Franklin	3:45
11.	"Never Gonna Be Alone" (featuring Lizzy McAlpine and John Mayer)	Collier; McAlpine; Mayer	4:09
12.	"Bridge over Troubled Water" (featuring John Legend and Tori Kelly)	Paul Simon	5:52
13.	"Over You" (featuring Aespa and Chris Martin)	Collier; Cho Yoon-kyung; Francesca Haincourt	2:53
14.	"Box of Stars Pt. 1" (featuring Kirk Franklin, Chika, D Smoke, Sho Madjozi, Yelle and Kanyi Mavi)	Collier; Jane Chika Oranika; Daniel Anthony Farris; Madjozi; Mavi; Julie Budet; Jean-François Perrier	5:16
15.	"Box of Stars Pt. 2" (featuring Metropole Orkest, Suzie Collier, Steve Vai and Voces8)		6:12
16.	"World O World"		6:14
Total length:			69:17

Djesse Vol. 4 – Japanese edition (bonus track)
No.	Title	Length
17.	"Little Blue" (Mahogany Session)	7:33
Total length:		76:50

Djesse Vol. 4 deluxe edition bonus tracks
No.	Title	Writer(s)	Length
17.	"Wild Wild Sea (Original "100,000" Voices)"		4:17
18.	"Magic" (featuring Emily King)		3:59
19.	"All Around You" (featuring The Mystery of the Bulgarian Voices)	Collier; Georgi Andreev	4:43
20.	"Bridge Over Troubled Water (Live at the Greek Theater)" (featuring John Legend and Tori Kelly)	Simon	10:29
21.	"Stars (Voice Memo)"		3:19
Total length:			96:04

=== Notes ===
- "100,000 Voices" and "Box of Stars Pt. 1" contains a sample of "Ovdoviala Lissitchkata" by Bulgarian State Television Female Vocal Choir.
- "Wellll" is stylized in all caps.
- "Never Gonna Be Alone" contains a sample of "In Too Deep (Acoustic Version)" by Jacob Collier.
- "Bridge over Troubled Water" is a cover of the Simon & Garfunkel song of the same name.

== Personnel ==
Adapted from the album's liner notes and TIDAL.

- Jacob Collier – vocals, instruments, arrangements, engineering, production, and mixing

=== Additional musicians ===
- Moulay Abdekrim Alaalaoui – background vocals and krakebs (track 15)
- Lydia Acquah – handclaps (track 14), gang vocals (track 15)
- The Aeolians of Oakwood University 2018 – choir (tracks 3, 15, 16)
  - Alaysia Bookal, Aleigha Durand, Allayna O'Quinn, Andre Smith, Asriel Davis, Asya Bookal, Briana Marshall, Carl Reed, Celine Sylvester, Chad Lupoe, Charles Wallington, Chesroleeysia Bobb, Cleavon Davis, Cole Henry, Dominique DeAbreu, Haley Flemons, Hector Jordan, Holland Sampson, JoPaul Scavella, Jonathan Mills, Jourdan Bardo, Kashea Whyte, Keviez Wilson, Kobe Brown, Kristin Hall, Leonard Brown, Lincoln Liburd, Louis Cleare, Maia Foster, Malia Ewen, Malik George, Malik Mchayle, Marc Simons, Marissa Wright, Matthew Cordner, Mykel Robinson-Collins, Naomi Parchment, Natrickie Louissant, Patricia Williams, Roddley Point Du Jour, Samara Bowden, Samella Carryl, Terell Francis-Clarke, Zarren Bennett
- Maia Agnes – Filipino/Tagalog spoken word (track 15)
- Arch Echo – guitar, keyboards, bass, and drums (track 1)
  - Adam Bentley, Adam Rafowitz, Joe Calderone, Joey Izzo, Richie Martinez
- Aespa (Winter, Karina, Giselle, and Ning Ning) – vocals (track 13)
- Audience Choirs from The Djesse World Tour 2022 – choir (tracks 1–3, 7, 8, 10, 13–15)
  - Sydney, Paris, Vienna, Cologne, Amsterdam, Munich, Utrecht, Auckland, Santiago de Compostela, Barcelona, Madrid, Stockholm, Bristol, Berlin, Oslo, Luxembourg
- Regina Averion – gang vocals (tracks 13, 14)
- Awich – spoken word (track 1)
- Prerana Balcham – Tamil spoken word (track 15)
- Felipe Baldauf – handclaps (track 14), gang vocals (track 15)
- Erin Bentlage – gang vocals (tracks 13, 14)
- Charlotte Blaudeck – German spoken word (track 15)
- Ben Bloomberg – handclaps (track 5), gang vocals (tracks 13, 14)
- Wahid Boudjeltia – background vocals and krakebs (track 15)
- Abdelhak Bounhar – background vocals and krakebs (track 15)
- Camilo – lead and background vocals, frog guiro, mouth harp, tiple, and whistling (track 9)
- Brandi Carlile – vocals (track 3)
- Stian Carstensen – pedal steel (track 3)
- Tereza Catarov – handclaps (track 14), gang vocals (track 15)
- Li-Chin Chang (張立勤) – Traditional Chinese spoken word (track 15)
- Tom Chichester-Clark – handclaps (track 14), gang vocals (track 15)
- Jordan Cohen – tenor saxophone (tracks 6, 15), background vocals (track 13)
- Sophie Collier – background vocals (track 2)
- Suzie Collier – orchestra conductor (tracks 1, 5, 7, 14, 15)
- Madison Cunningham – lead vocals (track 7)
- Mario Daisson – handclaps (track 14), gang vocals (track 15)
- Dapul – Filipino/Tagalog spoken word (track 15)
- Pat Davey – handclaps (track 14), gang vocals (track 15)
- Dhol Academy – Dhol drumming ensemble (tracks 1, 8, 14, 15)
  - Harjodh Singh Assi, Jasdeep Singh Bamrah, Taran Singh Bedi
- The Diner – additional horn arrangements (track 6)
- Shay Dyer-Harris – handclaps (track 14), gang vocals (track 15)
- Emily Elbert – gang vocals (tracks 13, 14)
- Adam Fell – gang vocals (tracks 13, 14)
- Jason Max Ferdinand – choir conductor and piano (tracks 3, 15, 16)
- Kirk Franklin – choir direction and additional vocal arrangements (track 10)
- Kirk Franklin Singers – background vocals (tracks 1, 10, 13, 14)
  - Ariel Campbell, Billy Mitchell, Carla Williams, Connie Johnson, Demarcus Williams, Drea Randle, Eboni Ellerson-Williams, Emerald Campbell, Ja'Quoi Griffin, Josiah Martin, Minon Bolton, Rachel Clifton, Sanesia Tillman, Stephanie Archer, Trent Shelby, Zebulon Ellis
- Sara Gazarek – gang vocals (tracks 13, 14)
- Nathan Greer – Turkish spoken word (track 15)
- Alex Guitierrez – gang vocals (tracks 13, 14)
- Francesca Haincourt – background vocals and gang vocals (tracks 13, 14)
- Ondrej Hanák – Czech spoken word (track 15)
- Neda Imamverdi – Farsi spoken word (track 15)
- Ben Jones – electric guitar (track 2)
- Juliette Jouan – French spoken word (track 15)
- JNY – spoken word (track 1)
- Hamid El Kasri – guembri (track 15)
- Katrin – spoken word (track 1)
- Jay Kavanagh – Spanish spoken word (track 15)
- Tori Kelly – lead vocals (track 12)
- Jonny Koh – guitar (track 6)
- Kont – spoken word (track 1)
- Kpoobari Saana Kpoobari-Ereba – Gokana spoken word (track 15)
- John Lampley – trumpet (tracks 6, 15)
- Clyde Lawrence – lead vocals (track 6), background vocals (tracks 6, 13)
- Gracie Lawrence – lead and background vocals (track 6)
- Jim Le Mesurier – percussion (tracks 1, 15)
- Yuri Lee – Korean spoken word (track 15)
- John Legend – lead vocals (track 12)
- Ryan Lerman – gang vocals (tracks 13, 14)
- Jang Li (站起來) – Taiwanese spoken word (track 15)
- Lindsey Lomis – lead and background vocals (track 5)
- David Longstreth – gang vocals (tracks 13, 14)
- Stevie Mackey – gang vocals (tracks 13, 14)
- Francesco Marcheselli – Italian spoken word (track 15)
- Feu Marinho – handclaps (track 14), gang vocals (track 15)
- Chris Martin – lead and background vocals (track 13)
- Kanyi Mavi – spoken word (track 1)
- John Mayer – electric guitar solo (track 11)
- Lizzy McAlpine – lead and background vocals (track 11)
- Michael McDonald – lead and background vocals (track 6)
- Magnus Mehta – percussion (tracks 1, 15)
- Shawn Mendes – lead and background vocals (track 10)
- Metropole Orkest – orchestra (tracks 1, 5, 7, 14, 15)
  - David Peijnenborgh, Denis Koenders, Ewa Zbyszynska, Jasper van Rosmalen, Kilian van Rooij, Leonid Nikishin, Merel Jonker, Pauline Terlouw, Ruben Margarita, Sarah Koch, Thomas Gould, Vera Laporeva, Willem Kok, Xaquín Carro Cribeiro – violin
  - Alex Welch, Isabella Petersen, Julia Jowett, Mieke Honingh, Wouter Huizinga – viola
  - Annie Tangberg, Geneviève Verhage, Jascha Albracht, Joel Siepmann, Susanne Rosmolen – cello
  - Arend Liefkes, Erik Winkelmann – double bass
  - Janine Abbas, Mariël van den Bos – flute, piccolo
  - Maxime le Minter – oboe
  - David Kweksilber – clarinet
  - Leo Janssen, Marc Scholten, Paul van der Feen, Sjoerd Dijkhuizen – saxophone
  - Diechje Minne, Pieter Hunfeld – French horn
  - Nico Schepers, Ray Bruinsma, Rik Mol – trumpet
  - Jan Bastiani, Maarten Combrink, Marc Godfroid – trombone
  - David Kutz, Ries Schellekens – tuba
  - Joke Schonewille – harp
- Martina Mihulkova – handclaps (track 14), gang vocals (track 15)
- Mopiano – spoken word (track 1)
- Abderrazak Moustaqim – background vocals and krakebs (track 15)
- Robin Mullarkey – electric bass (track 1)
- Naezy – spoken word (track 1)
- Barbara Obremska – Polish spoken word (track 15)
- Adam Osmianski – handclaps (track 14), gang vocals (track 15)
- Ivan Ormond – percussion (tracks 1, 15)
- Chris Ott – trombone (tracks 6, 15)
- David Pattman – percussion (tracks 1, 15)
- Akrivi Pavlidou – Greek spoken word (track 15)
- Robin Pecknold – gang vocals (tracks 13, 14)
- Michael Peha – gang vocals (tracks 13, 14)
- DáSa Pokorny – Slovak spoken word (track 15)
- Na La Takadia Praminta Putri – Indonesian spoken word (track 15)
- Emma Quaedvlieg – Serbian spoken word (track 15)
- Jessie Reyez – spoken word (track 1), Spanish spoken word (track 15)
- Jakub Rokosz – handclaps (track 14), gang vocals (track 15)
- Jordan Rose – drums (track 3)
- Daniel Rotem – gang vocals (tracks 13, 14)
- John Ryan – drums (track 6)
- Patricia S-Thomas – Swahili spoken word (track 15)
- Oumou Sangaré – background vocals (track 15)
- Barak Schmool – percussion (tracks 1, 15), handclaps (track 14), gang vocals (track 15)
- Konstantin Selyansky – Russian spoken word (track 15)
- Seema Seraj – gang vocals (tracks 13, 14)
- Anoushka Shankar – sitar (track 8)
- Noah Simon – gang vocals (tracks 13, 14)
- Willow Smith – scream vocals (track 1)
- Lennon Stella – background vocals (track 3)
- Stormzy – lead vocals and spoken word (track 10)
- Chris Thile – mandolin (track 7)
- Utako Toyama – Japanese spoken word (track 15)
- Steve Vai – electric guitar (tracks 1, 2, 15)
- Valas – spoken word (track 1)
- Sus Vasquez – electric guitar (track 1)
- Varijashree Venugopal – featured vocals (track 8), background vocals (track 14)
- Voces8 – choir (track 15)
- Noah Wang – Mandarin spoken word (track 15)
- Sam Wilkes – gang vocals (tracks 13, 14)
- Remi Wolf – background vocals (track 4)
- Yebba – vocals (track 12)
- Zakwe – spoken word (track 1)
- Kasia Zielinska – handclaps (track 14), gang vocals (track 15)

=== Technical ===
- Ben Bloomberg – additional mixing
- Emily Lazar – mastering

== Charts ==
Chart performance for Djesse Vol. 4
Chart (2024)	Peak position
Belgian Albums (Ultratop Flanders)	149
Scottish Albums (Official Charts)	22
UK Albums (Official Charts)	26
