= Hamid El Kasri =

Moroccan singer

Maâlem Hamid El Kasri
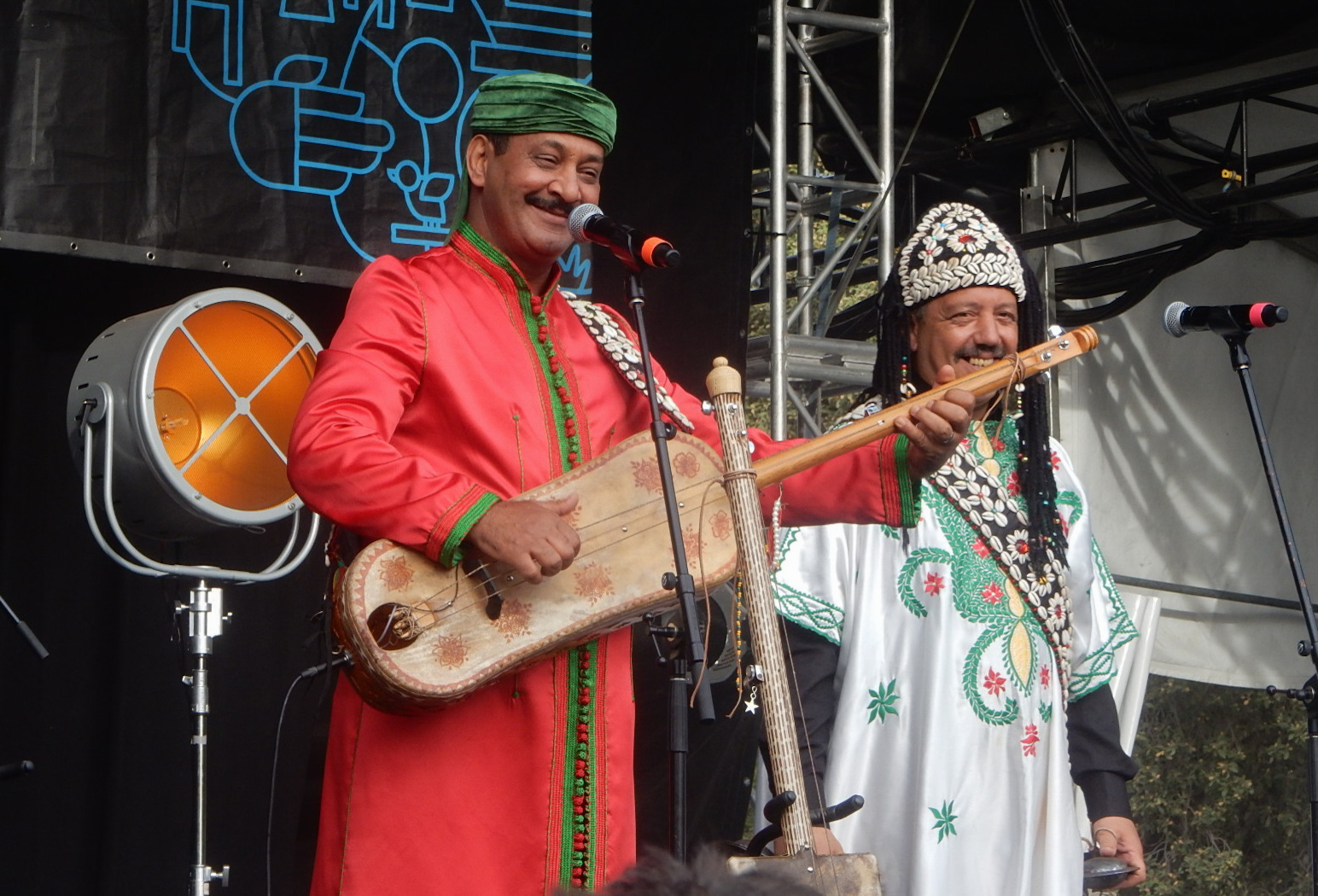
- Hamid El Kasri (left) performing in Australia

Background information
- Born: Hamid El Kasri; 1961 (age 64–65); Ksar El Kebir, Morocco
- Genre: Gnawa music
- Instruments: vocals; guembri

Hamid (Faraji)El Kasri (Arabic: حميد القصري; born 1961) is a Moroccan Gnawa musician traditionally considered a maâlem (Arabic: مُعَلِّم), or "master musician". Born in Ksar El Kebir, Morocco, he now lives in Rabat. His last name is an artist name simply meaning "from Ksar El Kebir". He began training at age seven, taught by the Tangier Maâlem Abdelouahed Stitou and Maâlem Alouane initially in the special Chemeli or Northern style of Gnawa music, which is distinctly different from the usual styles of Marrakesh. El Kasri is famed for his deep, intense voice, which has made him one of the most sought-after maâlems, both in Morocco and abroad. In addition to singing, he performs on the guembri (الكمبري), a three-stringed bass instrument. He is noted for having blended the Gnawa rhythms of the north and south of the Morocco.

== Performances and Collaborations ==
Having made a name for himself outside Morocco, El Kasri performs regularly with foreign musicians. Several of these occasions have been at the Gnaoua World Music Festival. In 2004, he played at the festival with Joe Zawinul, later performing there with Karim Ziad in 2010, and Hamayun Kahn and Shahin Shahida in 2011. In 2018, El Kasri opened the Gnaoua World Music Festival with Snarky Puppy, a Brooklyn-based jazz jam band.

In 2018, El Kasri performed with Jacob Collier at the BBC Proms, as a part of Prom 7. Later that year, he was featured on Collier's album Djesse Vol. 1, appearing on the song "Everlasting Motion".
