= Djesse Vol. 2 =

Studio album by Jacob Collier
- Released: 19 July 2019
- Genres: Jazz fusion; R&B; folk; rock; pop; classical
- Length: 70:42
- Labels: Hajanga; Decca / Geffen
- Producer: Jacob Collier

Jacob Collier chronology
Djesse Vol. 1 (2018)	Djesse Vol. 2 (2019)	Djesse Vol. 3 (2020)

Singles from Djesse Vol. 2
- 1. "Make Me Cry" Released: 12 April 2019; 2. "Here Comes the Sun" Released: 26 April 2019; 3. "Moon River" Released: 13 June 2019; 4. "It Don't Matter" Released: 5 July 2019

Djesse Vol. 2 (/ˈdʒɛsi/ JESS-ee) is the third studio album by Jacob Collier and the second album in the Djesse series, released on 19 July 2019. Djesse is a collection of four volumes which was announced 29 October 2018, each describing a different part of the day. It has been suggested that the title Djesse is a reference to Collier's own initials.

The first single from Djesse Vol. 2, "Make Me Cry", was released on 12 April 2019. A 360° music video was released for the single on 16 April 2019. On 26 April 2019, the second single from the volume was released, a cover of the Beatles' "Here Comes the Sun", and was produced in collaboration with Dodie Clark. Collier and Clark directed and also recorded the music video themselves.

The cover of "Moon River" opens with a 144-part choir featuring the voices of famous musicians (including Herbie Hancock, Quincy Jones, Tori Kelly, Chris Martin, Charlie Puth, and Hans Zimmer); Collier's collaborators from Djesse Vol. 1 and Vol. 2; students and professors from Oakwood University and MIT (including the MIT Festival Jazz Ensemble); Collier's own immediate family; Collier's studio & live sound engineering and management teams; and June Lee, a YouTuber known for his transcriptions of Collier's work. It also includes roughly 5000 different vocal recordings of Collier, making use of just intonation and of Collier's distinctive microtonal tunings. The track "Moon River" on the album won the Grammy Award for Best Arrangement, Instrumental or A Cappella in the 62nd Annual Grammy Awards.

The volume features collaborations with Sam Amidon, Dodie Clark, Lianne La Havas, JoJo, MARO, Oumou Sangaré, Becca Stevens, Chris Thile, Kathryn Tickell, and Steve Vai. Collier has been on the Djesse world tour since the release of the first volume.

== Track listing ==
Djesse Vol. 2 track listing
No.	Title	Writer(s)	Length
1.	"Intro" (with Kathryn Tickell)	Jacob Collier; Kathryn Tickell	1:27
2.	"Sky Above"	Collier; Tickell; Becca Stevens; MARO	4:11
3.	"Bakumbe" (featuring Sam Amidon)	Collier	4:09
4.	"Make Me Cry"	Collier	3:52
5.	"Moon River"	Henry Mancini; Johnny Mercer	8:17
6.	"Feel" (featuring Lianne La Havas)	Collier; Lianne La Havas	6:30
7.	"À Noite" (interlude)	Collier	2:24
8.	"Lua" (featuring MARO)	Collier; Maro	7:02
9.	"I Heard You Singing" (featuring Becca Stevens and Chris Thile)	Collier; Stevens	4:51
10.	"It Don't Matter" (featuring JoJo)	Collier	4:21
11.	"Here Comes the Sun" (featuring Dodie)	George Harrison	3:58
12.	"Dun Dun Ba Ba" (interlude)	Collier	1:55
13.	"Nebaluyo" (featuring Oumou Sangaré)	Collier; Oumou Sangaré	5:17
14.	"Do You Feel Love" (featuring Steve Vai)	Collier	3:33
15.	"Outro"	Collier	2:46
16.	"Time to Rest Your Weary Head"	Collier	6:09
Total length:			70:42

== Personnel ==
Adapted from album's liner notes and Tidal.

- Jacob Collier – vocals, instruments, arrangements, engineering, producer, and mixing

Additional musicians

- Sam Amidon – vocals, banjo, and fiddle (track 3)
- Josh Arcoleo – tenor saxophone (track 13)
- Max Baillie – viola (tracks 7, 8)
- Bill Bland – percussion and additional vocals (track 12)
- David Cohen – cello (tracks 7, 8)
- Sophie Collier – additional vocals (tracks 1–3)
- Suzie Collier – additional vocals (tracks 1–3)
- Fabio De Oliveira – percussion and additional vocals (track 12)
- Caroline Dearnley – cello (tracks 7, 8)
- dodie – featured vocals, clarinet, and clapping (track 11)
- Ruth Gibson – viola (tracks 7, 8)
- Thomas Gould – violin (tracks 7, 8)
- Magnus Johnston – violin (tracks 7, 8)
- JoJo – featured vocals (track 10)
- Giumba Kouyaté – additional acoustic guitar (track 13)
- Lianne La Havas – featured vocals (track 6)
- James Maddren – additional drums (tracks 2, 8, 9, 13)
- MARO – featured vocals (track 8), additional vocals (track 2)
- Robin Mullarkey – additional bass (tracks 2, 8, 9, 13–15)
- Jose Ortega – spoken word (track 12)
- Pino Palladino – electric bass (track 6)
- David Pattman – background vocals and percussion (track 12)
- Hammadi Rencurrell – percussion and additional vocals (track 12)
- Oumou Sangaré – featured vocals and clapping (track 13)
- Barak Schmool – percussion and additional vocals (track 12)
- Becca Stevens – featured vocals (track 9), additional vocals (track 2)
- Kathryn Tickell – Northumbrian pipes (tracks 1, 2, 14)
- Chris Thile – mandolin (track 9)
- Steve Vai – electric guitar (tracks 14, 15)

Additional technical personnel

- Chris Allgood – mastering
- Ben Bloomberg – mix engineer (tracks 4, 5)
- Tom Chichester-Clark – percussion recording engineer (track 12)
- Aviv Cohen – percussion recording engineer (track 12)
- Fiona Cruickshank – string sextet recording engineer (tracks 7, 8)
- Ryan Gladieux – vocal engineer (track 10)
- Emily Lazar – mastering
- Ed McEntee – recording engineer (track 2)
- Ross Newbauer – assistant mixer (track 11)
- Kerry Pompeo – assistant recording engineer (track 9)
- James Yost – mandolin recording engineer (track 9)
- Joe Zook – mixing engineer (track 11)
