= Djesse Vol. 3 =

Studio album by Jacob Collier
- Released: 14 August 2020
- Genres: R&B; EDM; funk; pop; neo soul
- Length: 41:05
- Label: Hajanga
- Producer: Jacob Collier

Jacob Collier chronology
Djesse Vol. 2 (2019)	Djesse Vol. 3 (2020)	Djesse Vol. 4 (2024)

Singles from Djesse Vol. 3
- 1. "Time Alone with You" Released: 29 November 2019; 2. "In My Bones" Released: 25 March 2020; 3. "All I Need" Released: 14 May 2020; 4. "He Won't Hold You" Released: 10 July 2020; 5. "Running Outta Love" Released: 31 July 2020

Djesse Vol. 3 (/ˈdʒɛsi/ JESS-ee) is the fourth studio album by English musician Jacob Collier and the third album in the Djesse series, released on 14 August 2020. Djesse is a collection of four volumes that was announced 29 October 2018. The title Djesse is a reference to Collier's own initials. Each of the albums in the series has been described by NPR as representing different parts of the day, the third being described as night. The concurrent Djesse World Tour 2022 has been ongoing since beginning in North America in March, landing in the UK and Europe in June, and heading towards Asia and Australia for the latter part of the year. The tour is scheduled to play in 91 locations worldwide.

At the 2021 Grammy Awards, the album was nominated for the Album of the Year; the track "All I Need" was nominated for the Best R&B Performance; and the track "He Won't Hold You" won the Best Arrangement, Instrumental and Vocals.

== Background ==
The quadruple-album project Djesse was announced during a YouTube livestream on 29 October 2018. The first two volumes of the project, Djesse Vol. 1 and Djesse Vol. 2, were released in December 2018 and July 2019 respectively. Describing Djesse, Collier has said: "What I was determined to do about two and a half years ago when I set out on this voyage was to, in some way, describe all of the music that I had been listening to for my whole life... The way in which I conceived of the whole thing was not particularly based on genre, but based on space."

Collier has described Djesse Vol. 3 as always having been "... the [volume] I was most excited about because it enabled me the space to explore a lot of the negative space type sounds, sounds made in the digital sphere, electronic stuff, which I suppose lends itself to hip-hop and R&B, and you've got soul music in there, and you've got funky music in there. And pop as well."

On 17 March 2020, due to the COVID-19 pandemic, Collier postponed the 2020 leg of his Djesse World Tour. In the same statement, he said that he was working to finish Djesse Vol. 3. The album was released just under 5 months later, on 14 August 2020.

== Singles and music videos ==
Collier released five singles and six music videos for Djesse Vol. 3.

The first single, "Time Alone with You" featuring Daniel Caesar, was released 29 November 2019. The music video for "Time Alone With You", released 5 December 2019, was directed and edited by Collier himself.

The second single, "In My Bones", featuring Kimbra and Tarriona "Tank" Ball, was released 25 March 2020. The music video for "In My Bones" was also released on 25 March 2020. Kimbra and Tarriona "Tank" Ball both appear in the video.

The third single, "All I Need", featuring Ty Dolla Sign and Mahalia, was released 14 May 2020. The music video for "All I Need", was released on 17 June 2020. Tee Ken Ng directed and animated the video, which is presented as a series of circular papers that, when spun on a record player, appear to create a moving picture, similar to a zoetrope.

The fourth single, "He Won't Hold You", featuring Rapsody, was released 10 July 2020. The music video for "He Won't Hold You" was released 16 July 2020. Daniel Bruson animated and edited the video to have a hand-drawn aesthetic, hand-painting over 1200 images.

The fifth single, "Running Outta Love", featuring Tori Kelly, was released 31 July 2020.

The fifth music video, for "Sleeping On My Dreams", was released 17 August 2020, three days after the album's release. It was filmed in a single day in January 2020, and features Collier dancing with a group of nine professional dancers.

The sixth music video, a lyric video for "Count the People", directed by BASA and Collier, was released 26 August 2020.

== Television and other appearances ==
On 26 May 2020, Collier appeared on Jimmy Kimmel Live!, releasing an at home version of "All I Need" in which he played traditional instruments and sang, as well as using noises from household items, all from inside his bathroom. Mahalia and Ty Dolla Sign made appearances as well. Collier made another video of himself performing the song from home (again featuring Mahalia) for the BBC's show Later... with Jools Holland. A version of "Running Outta Love" was shown on The Late Show with Stephen Colbert with Collier and Tori Kelly performing.

On 9 July 2020, a Tiny Desk At Home Concert by Collier was released on NPR. In the 16-minute set, Collier performs "All I Need", "Time Alone With You", and "He Won't Hold You". To make the video, he filmed himself performing the set four times (once on bass, once on drums, once on keyboard, and once on melodica and percussion, with all four singing); the four videos were then edited together by Collier, stitched into one continuous shot.

On 13 January 2021, Collier and Mahalia performed "All I Need" on The Tonight Show Starring Jimmy Fallon. On 26 January, Collier performed "Sleeping On My Dreams" on The Late Late Show with James Corden.

== Track listing ==
All tracks are written by Jacob Collier, except where noted. All tracks are produced by Jacob Collier, except "Count The People" (produced by Collier and Ben Bloomberg^{[a]}).

Djesse Vol. 3 track listing
No.	Title	Writer(s)	Length
1.	"Clarity"		0:51
2.	"Count the People" (featuring Jessie Reyez and T-Pain)	Collier; Jessie Reyez	2:47
3.	"In My Bones" (featuring Kimbra and Tank and the Bangas)	Collier; Kimbra Johnson; Tarriona Ball	4:09
4.	"Time Alone with You" (featuring Daniel Caesar)	Collier; Daniel Caesar	4:16
5.	"All I Need" (featuring Mahalia and Ty Dolla Sign)	Collier; Michael Peha; Tyrone William Griffin, Jr.	4:05
6.	"In Too Deep" (featuring Kiana Ledé)		3:52
7.	"Butterflies"		2:02
8.	"Sleeping on My Dreams"		4:16
9.	"Running Outta Love" (featuring Tori Kelly)	Collier; Tori Kelly	4:25
10.	"Light It Up on Me"		2:05
11.	"He Won't Hold You" (featuring Rapsody)	Collier; Marlanna Evans	5:00
12.	"To Sleep"		3:12
Total length:			41:05

Djesse Vol. 3 – Japanese edition (bonus track)
No.	Title	Length
13.	"In Too Deep" (acoustic version; featuring Kiana Ledé)	3:25
Total length:		44:31

=== Notes ===
- "Clarity" is stylized in all caps
- ^{^[a]} signifies a co-producer

== Personnel ==
- Jacob Collier – vocals, instruments, arrangements, engineering, producer, and mixing

Additional musicians

- Tarriona "Tank" Ball – featured vocals (track 3)
- Erin Bentlage – vocals (track 7)
- Ben Bloomberg – background vocals (track 8)
- Daniel Caesar – featured vocals (track 4)
- Ella Collier – background vocals (track 10)
- Sophie Collier – background vocals (track 10)
- Suzie Collier – background vocals (track 10)
- James Copus – flugelhorn (tracks 4, 11), trumpet (track 4)
- Julia Easterlin – background vocals (tracks 10, 11)
- JoJo – additional vocals (track 4)
- Tori Kelly – featured vocals (track 9)
- Kimbra – featured vocals (track 3)
- Kiana Ledé – featured vocals (track 6)
- Mahalia – featured vocals (track 5)
- Michael Mayo – background vocals (tracks 10, 11)
- MonoNeon – electric bass (track 3)
- Michael Peha – background vocals (track 8)
- Rapsody – featured vocals (track 11)
- Jessie Reyez – featured vocals (track 2)
- Nathan Schram – background vocals (tracks 10, 11)
- Kristen Sing – spoken word (track 10)
- Becca Stevens – background vocals (tracks 8, 10, 11)
- Chelsea Stevens – background vocals (track 8)
- T-Pain – featured vocals (track 2)
- Malika Tirolien – background vocals (tracks 10, 11)
- Ty Dolla $ign – featured vocals (track 5)

Additional technical personnel

- Chris Allgood – mastering
- Ben Bloomberg – mix engineer (tracks 2–11), co-producer (track 2), programming (track 6), synthesizer programming (track 8)
- Marlanna Evans – vocal engineer for Rapsody (track 11)
- DJ Fai – vocal recording engineer for Ty Dolla $ign (track 5)
- Wissam Ghorayeb – vocal recording engineer for JoJo (track 4)
- Emily Lazar – mastering (tracks 1–5, 7–12)
- Matthew Maroulakos – assistant recording engineer (track 11)
- Kerry Pompeo – assistant recording engineer (track 3)
