= Arch Echo =

American progressive metal band

- Origin: Nashville, Tennessee, US
- Genres: Progressive metal, jazz fusion, instrumental rock, djent
- Years active: 2016–present
- Members: Joey Izzo; Adam Rafowitz; Adam Bentley; Joe Calderone; Richie Martinez
- Website: www.archecho.com

Arch Echo is an American instrumental progressive metal band from Nashville, Tennessee. Formed in 2016, it consists of keyboardist Joey Izzo, guitarists Adam Rafowitz and Adam Bentley, bassist Joe Calderone, and drummer Richie Martinez. They have released three studio albums: Arch Echo (2017), You Won’t Believe What Happens Next! (2019), and Final Pitch (2023).

== Biography ==
Arch Echo formed in 2016 while its members attended the Berklee College of Music. They have released three studio albums: Arch Echo (2017), You Won’t Believe What Happens Next! (2019), and Final Pitch (2023), which featured guest appearances from Jordan Rudess, Anthony Vincent, and Adrián Terrazas-González. They have toured with Dream Theater, Periphery, Plini, VOLA and Jacky Vincent. The band contributed to Jacob Collier's song "100,000 Voices", from the album Djesse Vol. 4.

== Style and influences ==
New Noise Magazine described Arch Echo's style as "instrumental prog metal that recalls the classics (Steve Vai, Dream Theater) in sheer speed and general wankery (in a good way), mixed in with riff-based djent (Animals as Leaders, Periphery), along with the more hip-shaking, jazzy style that’s been popular of late (Polyphia, Plini)." Other influences include Rush, Allan Holdsworth, Cynic, and Meshuggah.

== Band members ==
- Joey Izzo - keyboards (2016–present)
- Adam Rafowitz - guitar (2016–present)
- Adam Bentley - guitar (2016–present)
- Joe Calderone - bass (2016–present)
- Richie Martinez - drums (2016–present)

== Discography ==
=== Studio albums ===
- Arch Echo (2017)
- You Won’t Believe What Happens Next! (2019)
- Final Pitch (2023)

=== EPs ===
- Story I (2020)
- 3X3: Catalyst (2025)
