= You and I (We Can Conquer the World) =

Song by Stevie Wonder

from the album Talking Book
- Released: October 27, 1972
- Recorded: Summer 1972
- Genre: Soul
- Length: 4:38
- Label: Tamla
- Songwriter: Stevie Wonder
- Producers: Stevie Wonder; Robert Margouleff; Malcolm Cecil

"You and I (We Can Conquer the World)" is a song written and sung by Stevie Wonder from his 1972 album Talking Book. Wonder is also credited for playing piano and T.O.N.T.O. synthesizer on the song.

== Personnel ==
Credits adapted from the Talking Book liner notes.

- Stevie Wonder – lead vocal, piano, T.O.N.T.O. synthesizer, Moog bass
- Malcolm Cecil – Moog synthesizer programming
- Robert Margouleff – Moog synthesizer programming

== Cover versions ==
- Barbra Streisand included a rendition of the song in her 1975 album Lazy Afternoon. This is the first time the song is listed and released as "You and I".
- In a sixth-season episode of the CBS sitcom Good Times, Michael Evans (Ralph Carter) performs the song at the wedding of his sister Thelma (Bern Nadette Stanis) to Keith Anderson (Ben Powers).
- Santita Jackson performed the song at the 1992 wedding of Barack and Michelle Obama
- O'Bryan recorded the song as the title cut from his 1983 album of the same name.
- Joe Cocker recorded a cover for his 1996 album Organic.
- Vesta Williams included a cover in her 1998 album Relationships.
- Mariah Carey sang the song on BET's Walk of Fame honoring Stevie Wonder on October 29, 2002.
- Michael Bublé recorded a version for his 2005 album It's Time.
- Trijntje Oosterhuis recorded a cover for her 2011 album Sundays in New York.
- Macy Gray included the song on her 2012 Stevie Wonder tribute album Talking Book. It is listed as "You and I (We Can Conquer the World)".
- Jacob Collier covered the tune on his 2016 debut album In My Room. This cover won him the 2017 Grammy Award for Best Arrangement, Instrumental or A Cappella.

== George Michael version ==
In April 2011, George Michael released a version of the song titled just "You and I" solely on MP3 as a gift to Prince William and Catherine Middleton on the occasion of their wedding on April 29, 2011. Although the MP3 was downloadable for free, Michael asked that downloaders make a contribution to the "Prince William & Miss Catherine Middleton Charitable Gift Fund".

The song had its world premiere on April 15, 2011, on CNN's Piers Morgan Tonight. The show repeated on Saturday, April 16.
