= The Light for Days =

Studio album by Jacob Collier
- Released: 10 October 2025
- Recorded: 2025
- Studio: home studio, London
- Genre: Folk
- Length: 36:24
- Label: Hajanga
- Producer: Jacob Collier

Jacob Collier chronology
Djesse Vol. 4 (2024)	The Light for Days (2025)

Singles from The Light for Days
- 1. "I Know (A Little)" Released: 11 September 2025; 2. "Heaven (Butterflies)" Released: 8 October 2025

The Light for Days is the sixth studio album by English musician Jacob Collier, released on 10 October 2025. The album contains a combination of original compositions and covers, including a cover of the Staves' "Icarus," from whose lyrics the album takes its title.

== Background ==
In contrast to the highly collaborative and maximalist approach of the Djesse album series, The Light for Days features a minimalist and acoustic sound centred around his 5-string guitar using the alternative tuning DAEAD. The Light for Days was recorded in four days in the music room of Collier's family home in London.

== Track listing ==
All tracks are written by Jacob Collier, except where noted.

No.	Title	Writer(s)	Length
1.	"You Can Close Your Eyes"	James Taylor	3:57
2.	"Heaven (Butterflies)"	Collier, The Days on Earth	4:57
3.	"Thom Thumb"		1:44
4.	"Fairytale Lullaby"	John Martyn	3:08
5.	"Norwegian Wood"	Lennon–McCartney	2:35
6.	"Keep an Eye on Summer"	Brian Wilson, Bob Norberg, Mike Love	2:46
7.	"I Know (A Little)"		3:40
8.	"Where Did My Apple Fall?"		2:33
9.	"Sweet Melody"		1:34
10.	"Icarus"	The Staves	3:46
11.	"Something Heavy"		5:44
Total length:			36:24

== Personnel ==
Credits adapted from Tidal.

=== Musicians ===
- Jacob Collier – vocals; acoustic 5-string, 10-string and bass guitars; mandolin on "You Can Close Your Eyes"; synth bass on "Heaven," "I Know" and "Something Heavy"; double bass on "Heaven"; toy piano on "Keep an Eye on Summer" and "Something Heavy"; flute and clarinet on "Keep an Eye on Summer"; dulcitone and music box on "Where Did My Apple Fall?"; kick drum on "Icarus"; upright and electric pianos, synthesizer, harp and bells on "Something Heavy"; arrangements
- audience choirs of Glasgow and Lisbon, 2022 – choir on "Something Heavy"

=== Production ===
- Jacob Collier – producer, engineer, mixing engineer
- Ben Bloomberg – mixing engineer
- Emily Lazar – mastering engineer
- Bob DeMaa – second mastering engineer

== Charts ==
The Light for Days charted on the UK Official Album Downloads Chart for two weeks, peaking at number 50.

Chart performance for The Light for Days
Chart (2025)	Peak position
Scottish Albums (OCC)	21
UK Album Downloads (OCC)	50
