= Tank and the Bangas =

American musical group

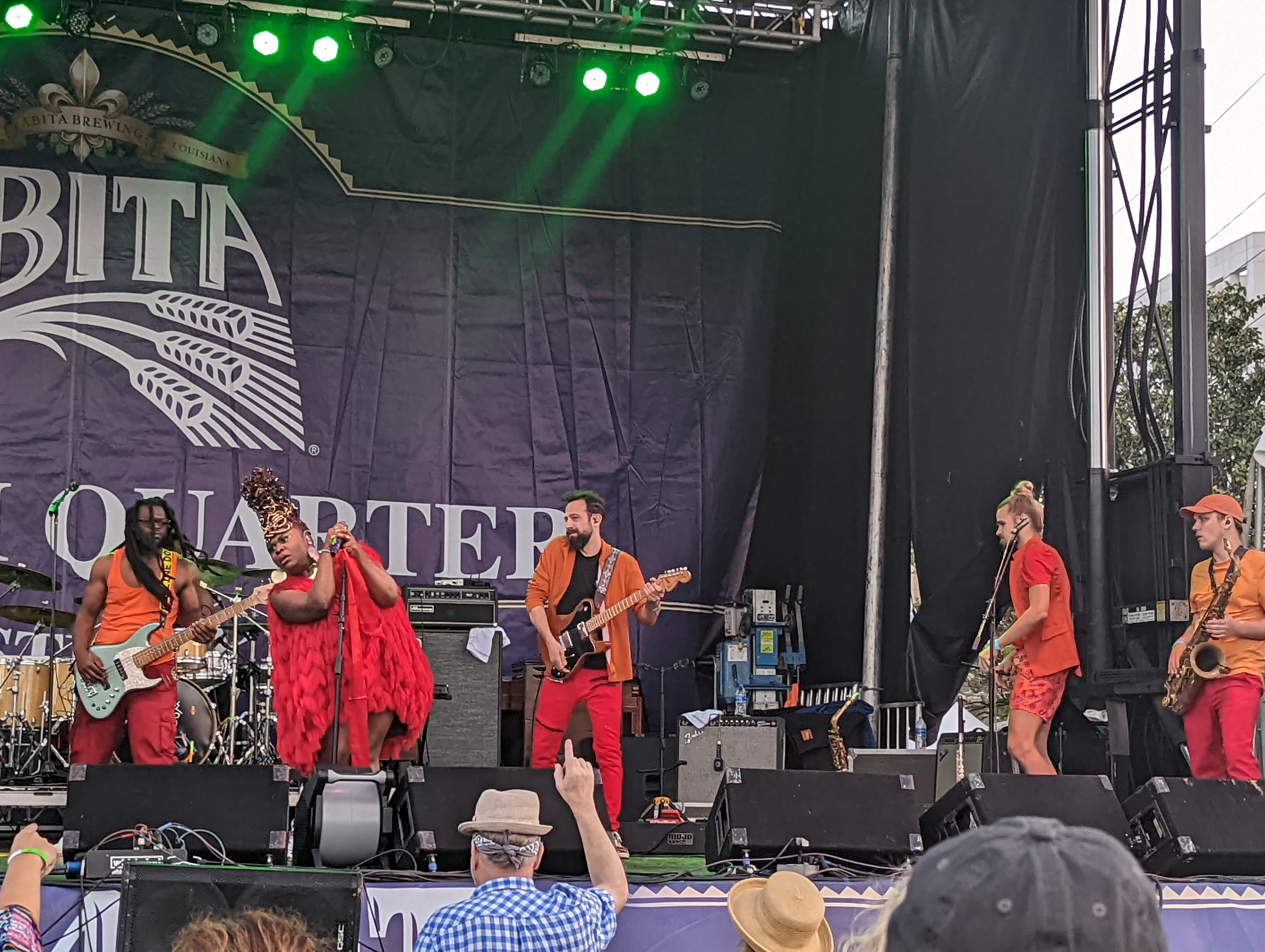
- Tank and The Bangas performing at French Quarter Fest, New Orleans in 2022

Background information
- Origin: New Orleans, Louisiana, U.S.
- Genres: Funk; soul; hip hop; rock; spoken word
- Years active: 2011–present
- Labels: Verve Forecast; Verve; UMG
- Members: Tarriona "Tank" Ball; Norman Spence
- Past members: Joe Johnson; Danny Abel; Anjelika "Jelly" Joseph; Tia Henderson; Jonathan Johnson; Albert Allenback; Keenan McRae; Nita Bailey; Christopher Menge; Nicole Spence
- Website: www.tankandthebangas.com

Tank and the Bangas is an American musical group based in New Orleans, Louisiana. The band won the 2017 NPR Tiny Desk Contest and in November 2019, they were nominated in the Best New Artist category for the 2020 Grammy Awards. They have released three studio albums, Thinktank (2013), Green Balloon (2019), and Red Balloon (2022). In 2025, they won their first Grammy for the 2024 album, The Heart, The Mind, The Soul for Best Spoken Word Poetry Album.

== History ==
Members of Tank and the Bangas met at a New Orleans open mic show called Liberation Lounge at now-closed Blackstar Cafe and Books in the Algiers section of New Orleans and formed the group in 2011.

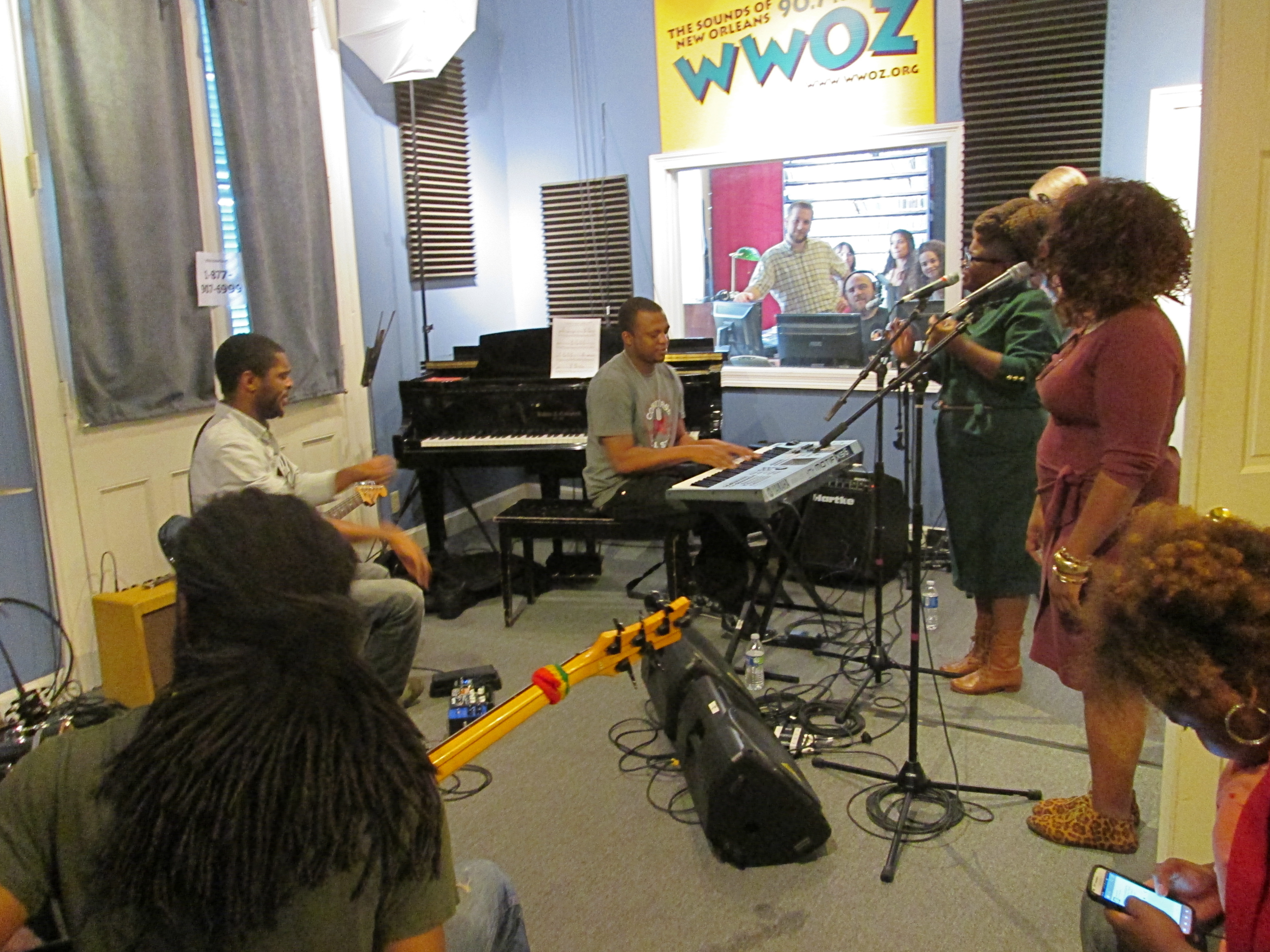
Tank and the Bangas live performance at New Orleans radio station WWOZ in 2013

== Style ==
Writing in The Washingtonian, Heather Rudow described the group's work as "lively fusion of funk, soul, hip hop, rock, and spoken word." Speaking to the Times-Picayune, the musicians in the group mentioned a variety of genres they identify with, including rock, folk, gospel and Anjelika "Jelly" Joseph's invention "Soulful Disney". In addition to Disney, the group has also mentioned anime as influence on the group's "childlike" and "magical" sensibility, in Ball's words. In the Financial Times, Joshua David Stein said, "Tank and the Bangas don’t conform to the jazz stereotypes trotted out in the lobbies of convention hotels or milked on Frenchman Street. It’s New Orleans but it’s New Orleans now."

== Reception ==
In The Village Voice, Rajul Punjabi described the group's debut album ThinkTank as "sincere and eclectic. Ball’s vocals are strong and versatile—evidence of her childhood in church—and she coasts through sweet melodies and wide-ranging vocal undulations reminiscent of Nicki Minaj’s character voices. She throws gentle shade when reminded of this — 'I’ve been doing that before she came out,' she says."

Their song, Oh Heart, was featured in the BoJack Horseman season 4 episode Ruthie.

=== NPR ===
Naming Tank and the Bangas the 2017 winner of NPR's Tiny Desk Contest for their song "Quick", NPR co-host of All Songs Considered Bob Boilen said, "What won me over about the band's performance of 'Quick' were the interactions among lead singer Tarriona 'Tank' Ball and her bandmates, and the way they seemed to surprise one another. It all felt so organic and on-the-spot." Juror Trey Anastasio of Phish said, "I immediately loved this...Tank is a force of nature, just full of joy—and her band is killing in the background." The story of the evolution of Tank's voice was covered in an episode of NPR's World Cafe show for essential and emerging artists.

== Members ==
=== Current members ===
- Tarriona "Tank" Ball – lead vocals (2011–present)
- Joshua Johnson – drums, musical director (2011–2024)
- Norman Spence II – keyboards, guitar (2011–present)
- Albert Allenback – alto saxophone, flute (2014–2023)

=== Touring members ===
Performers that while not core members of the band, play with the band at live performances and on some album tracks.

- Anjelika "Jelly" Joseph – background vocals (2013–2022)
- Tia Henderson- Background Vocals(2019-2022)
- Danny Abel – guitar (2018-2022)
- Jonathan Johnson – bass (2017–present)
- Etienne Stoufflet – tenor saxophone (2013–present)
- Kayla Jasmine – vocals (2016–2019)

=== Past members ===
- Merell Burkett, Jr. – keyboard (2013–2020)
- Joe Johnson – keyboard (2013–2016)
- Keenan McRae – guitar (2013)
- Nita Bailey – percussion (2013)
- Christopher Menge – guitar (2013)
- Nicole Spence – background vocals (2013)

== Discography ==
Tank and the Bangas discography
- Studio albums: 4
- EPs: 6
- Live albums: 1
- Singles: 24
- Music videos: 24

=== Studio albums ===
Title	Details	Peak chart positions	
Title	Details	US Sales	US Heat
Think Tank	Released: December 19, 2013; Label: Self-released; Formats: CD, LP, digital download, streaming	–	–
Green Balloon	Released: May 3, 2019; Label: Verve Forecast Records, UMG; Formats: CD, LP, digital download, streaming	73	3
Red Balloon	Released: May 13, 2022; Label: Verve Forecast, UMG; Formats: CD, LP, digital download, streaming	74	21
The Heart, the Mind, the Soul	Released: August 30, 2024; Label: Verve Forecast, UMG; Formats: CD, LP, digital download, streaming	?	?

=== Live albums ===
Title	Details
The Big Bang Theory: Live at Gasa Gasa	Released: December 5, 2014; Label: Self-released; Format: CD, digital download, streaming

=== Extended plays ===
Title	Details	Peak chart positions
Title	Details	US Heat
Live Vibes	Released: April 21, 2016; Label: Verve Label Group, UMG; Format: LP, digital download, streaming	21
Jam in the Van - Tank and the Bangas	Released: August 1, 2017; Label: Jam in the Van; Format: Digital download, streaming	–
Live Vibes 2	Released: February 15, 2019; Label: Verve Forecast, UMG; Format: LP, digital download, streaming	–
Friend Goals	Released: November 20, 2020; Label: Verve Forecast, UMG; Format: Vinyl, digital download, streaming	–
Tank and the Bangas (Live)	Released: September 9, 2022; Label: Verve Forecast, UMG; Format: streaming	–
Pretty Poems	Released: March 10, 2023; Label: UMG; Format: Digital download, streaming	–
Floating	Released: November 24, 2023; Label: Verve Forecast, UMG; Format: Vinyl	–

=== Singles ===
==== As lead artist ====
Title	Year	Album
"Rhythm of Life"	2013	Think Tank
"Drummers"	2015	Non-album single
"Quick" (Note: A live version of "Quick" was included on the Live Vibes EP)	2017	Non-album single
"Smoke.Netflix.Chill"	2018	Green Balloon
"Spaceships"	2018	Green Balloon
"I'll Be Seeing You"	2018	Can You Ever Forgive Me? (Original Motion Picture Soundtrack)
"Ants"	2019	Green Balloon
"Nice Things"	2019	Green Balloon
"For André"	2020	Non-album single
"What the World Needs Now" (featuring David Shaw, PJ Morton, Alexis Marceaux, Maggie Koerner, Sasha Masakowski, Berkley the Artist, Rahim Glaspy & Tracci Lee)	2020	Non-album single
"Self Care" (featuring Jaime Woods and Orleans Big)	2020	Friend Goals
"To Be Real" (featuring Hasizzle, Keedy Black, and Big Choo)	2020	Friend Goals
"Big" (with Big Freedia)	2021	Red Balloon
"Back in a Minute"	2021	Madden NFL 22
"No ID"	2022	Red Balloon
"Black Folk" (featuring Alex Isley and Masego or remix featuring Alex Isley, Masego, Rhapsody, Kota the Friend, Orleans Big, Dee-1)	2022	Pretty Poems and Floating
"Stolen Fruit"	2022	Red Balloon
"Why Try"	2022	Red Balloon
"Oak Tree"	2022	Red Balloon
"There Goes the Neighborhood"	2022	Pretty Poems and Floating
"Outside"	2022	Floating
"She's a Rainbow" (from Ghostwriter)	2022	Non-album single
"Communion in my Cup" (featuring Earthgang and The Ton3s)	2022	Red Balloon and Floating
"DM Pretty" (Live OffBeat Session)	2023	Pretty Poems and Floating

==== As featured artist ====
Title	Year	Album
"In My Bones" (Jacob Collier featuring Kimbra and Tank and the Bangas)	2020	Djesse Vol. 3
"Let My People Go" (Donald Lawrence and the Tri-City Singers featuring Tank and the Bangas)	2021	Goshen
"Betty Bussit" (Big Freedia featuring Soaky Siren and Tank and the Bangas)	2021	Big Diva Energy

=== Music videos ===
Title	Year	Director
"Boxes" (ReLoaded)	2013	RandoMe
"Drummers"	2015	RawKus TV
"Quick"	2017	FosterBear Films
"Spaceships"	2018	Nick Spanos
"Spaceships" (Live Performance)	2018	Kyle Goldberg
"Ants"	2019	Jean Baptist's-Ramondi
"Nice Things" (Live Performance)	2019	Kyle Goldberg
"Nice Things"	2019	Danny Williams
"Hot Air Balloons" (featuring Alex Isley)	2019	TATB and Tavia Osbey
"Forgetfulness"	2019	Alina Kulieva
"I'll Be Seeing You"	2019	Unknown
"Dope Girl Magic"	2020	Jake Wilson
"Lazy Daze" (featuring Robert Glasper)	2020	David Bates Jr. and Tavia Osbey
"What the World Needs Now" (with various artists)	2020	Unknown
"Self-Care" (featuring Jaime Woods, Orleans Big, and Anjelika "Jelly" Joseph)	2020	Unknown
"To Be Real" (featuring Hasizzle, Keedy Black, and Big Choo)	2020	Tarriona Ball
"Fluff" (lyric video) (featuring DUCKWRTH, Christian Scott, aTune Adjuah)	2020	Baptiste Leroux
"Big" (featuring Big Freedia)	2021	Marion Hill
"No ID"	2022	Phillip Youmans
"Black Folk" (lyric video) (featuring Alex Isley and Masego)	2022	Michelle Renslo
"Stolen Fruit"	2022	Unknown
"Black Folk" (featuring Alex Isley and Masego)	2022	Unknown
"Why Try"	2022	Unknown
"Communion in My Cup" (featuring The Ton3s)	2022	Unknown

== Honors ==
- 2014 RAWards Best New Orleans Artist of the Year
- 2014 Offbeat Magazine Emerging Artist Award
- 2016 Afropunk Festival contest winners
- 2017 NPR Tiny Desk Contest winner
- 2020 Grammy Award for Best New Artist (nomination)
- 2023 Grammy Award for Best Progressive R&B Album (nomination for Red Balloon)
- 2024 Grammy Award for Best Global Music Performance (nomination for "Todo Colores" with Ibrahim Maalouf and Cimafunk)
- 2025 Grammy Award for Best Spoken Word Poetry Album (win for The Heart, The Mind, The Soul)
