= Derek Collier =

English violinist (1927–2008)

- Born: 1927
- Died: 24 June 2008 (aged 80–81)
- Occupation: Violinist

Derek Collier (1927 – 24 June 2008) was an English violinist and leader of the Bournemouth Symphony Orchestra. Collier studied at the Royal Academy of Music in London and also with Alfredo Campoli. He performed as a soloist with many of the leading British and North American orchestras and gave the first performances in Britain of violin concertos by Dag Wirén, Joaquín Rodrigo and Boris Blacher.

Collier used a violin made by Pietro Guarneri and he made a number of commercial recordings for EMI and Decca with pianists including Ernest Lush and Daphne Ibbott.

Collier is the father of violinist Suzie Collier and grandfather of Grammy Award-winning multi-instrumentalist Jacob Collier.
