= This Is What I Mean =

Studio album by Stormzy
- Released: 25 November 2022
- Genre: British hip-hop; contemporary R&B; soul
- Length: 51:20
- Label: 1. Merky; 0207 Def Jam
- Producer: Prgrshn; Daniel Buhlebuyeza Miles; Dion Wardle; George Moore; Grades; Joel Peters; Jojo Mukeza; Juls; Knox Brown; KZ; Owen Cutts; P2J; Scribz Riley; Tempoe; Tendai

Stormzy chronology
Heavy Is the Head (2019)	This Is What I Mean (2022)

Singles from This Is What I Mean
- 1. "Hide & Seek" Released: 14 October 2022; 2. "Firebabe" Released: 10 November 2022

This Is What I Mean is the third studio album by British rapper Stormzy, released on 25 November 2022, by #Merky and 0207 Def Jam. The album serves as Stormzy's first release under 0207 Def Jam. It features guest appearances from Amaarae, Ayra Starr, Black Sherif, Debbie, India Arie, Jacob Collier, Ms Banks, Nao, Sampha, and Tendai, alongside production from Grades, Juls, P2J, Scribz Riley, and several other producers. The album serves as a follow-up to Stormzy's second album, Heavy Is the Head (2019).

Upon release, This Is What I Mean was met with widespread critical acclaim, with music critics praising Stormzy's "hard-hitting lyricism". The album debuted atop the UK Albums Chart, moving 27,800 album-equivalent units in its first week, marking the rapper's third consecutive chart-topping album, and was nominated for Album of the Year at the 2023 Brit Awards. The album was supported by two singles: "Hide & Seek" and "Firebabe", both of which peaked in the top ten of the UK Singles Chart.

== Background and recording ==
Following the album's announcement, through a press release, Stormzy revealed that the album was recorded on Osea Island in England during a series of music camps with a team of "world-class musicians and the best producers, writers and artists in the world" in a "free atmosphere", where Stormzy "prayed every morning" during its creation.

When you hear about music camps, they always sound intense and somber. People saying, “We need to make an album.” “We need to make some hit records.” But this felt beautifully free. We’re all musicians, but we weren’t always doing music. Some days we played football or walked around taking pictures. And the byproduct to that was very beautiful music. Because when you marry that ethos with world-class musicians and the best producers, writers, and artists in the world, and we’re in one space, that’s a recipe for something that no one can really imagine. You can’t even calculate what that’s going to come up with. And it came up with a big chunk of this album.

== Release and promotion ==
On 23 September 2022, Stormzy released the non-album single "Mel Made Me Do It" which many assumed would mirror the sound of the album. Following an almost three-year hiatus from social media, Stormzy announced the album on his social media on 12 October 2022, sharing the cover art and tracklist. Just two days later, Stormzy released the album's lead single, "Hide & Seek" on 14 October 2022, and was preceded by clips of Stormzy recording the song. On 10 November 2022, Stormzy released the album's second single, "Firebabe".

== Critical reception ==
Professional ratings
Aggregate scores
Source	Rating
Metacritic	79/100
Review scores
Source	Rating
Clash	8/10
Evening Standard	4/5 stars
Financial Times	4/5 stars
The Guardian	4/5 stars
The Independent	5/5 stars
NME	4/5 stars
Pitchfork	7.7/10
Rolling Stone UK	4/5 stars
The Telegraph	4/5 stars
The Times	4/5 stars

This Is What I Mean was met with "generally favorable" reviews from critics. At Metacritic, which assigns a weighted average rating out of 100 to reviews from mainstream publications, this release received an average score of 79, based on 14 reviews.

Writing for Clash, James Mellen wrote that the record "is a low-key affair, downbeat and introspective" while the album's tracks are "intimate in theme as well as production", describing the album as "Stormzy’s cohesive and coherent project to date". The Guardian's Alexis Petridis wrote that "This Is What I Mean sticks to subtlety and nuance" and that "it’s a mood that fits perfectly, even if it isn’t what people might be expecting". Helen Brown for The Independent compared Stormzy to Donny Hathaway, stating that he "has a voice that can reach through the darkness and steady your heart". Brown wrote that the record "reflects all that in the way it puts Stormzy’s English vernacular afloat on a wider stage" while she praised the album's production. Sam Moore for NME wrote that the album has a "largely mellow and mature tone", however, "there is a small sense of disappointment that we don’t get to hear Stormzy let loose on the mic more often". Moore concluded that "the hard-hitting lyricism is still present" and that "Stormzy continues to lead the way" in the UK rap scene. Pitchfork's Will Pritchard wrote that on the record, "Stormzy is performing for an audience of one: God". He concluded that "Stormzy is able to open his lungs, not just to scream and shout, but to breathe, and sing" and that with This Is What I Mean, Stormzy is "at the height of his powers, both creative and otherwise".

Rolling Stone UK's Emmanuel Onapa wrote that "This Is What I Mean marks a significant departure from his sound" and that throughout the record, Stormzy "provides a deeply personal and powerful reflection of the tranquillity, joy and blissfulness" which stems from his "Christian faith and as a black man navigating Britain". Onapa described the album as a "huge step forward" for the rapper while stating that it's a contender for album of the year. The Telegraph's Neil McCormick wrote that the album "is a moody, introspective, emotional third album of love, loss and philosophical reconciliation". McCormick continued that the album is "melancholic yet hopeful, ruminatively apologetic, intensely intimate and sensitive to the point of fragility" and that the album "sacrifices the innate swagger of rap to expose" Stormzy's vulnerability.

Will Hodgkinson of The Times described the album as a "major achievement" with atypical guest stars from "contemporary Afrobeat, soul and R&B", while David Smyth of the Evening Standard called it Stormzy's "most downbeat, intimate collection" that "very much sounds like a team effort[, t]hough the feel is insular and understated". Smyth summarised the two main themes on the album as being Stormzy "hurting from a break-up" and "the need for the advancement of black culture as a whole".

=== Year-end lists ===
Select year-end rankings of This Is What I Mean
Publication	List	Rank	Ref.
Clash	Clash Albums of the Year 2022	20	
Complex UK	Complex UK's Best Albums of 2022	10	
Dazed	The 20 best albums of 2022	20	
Gigwise	Gigwise's 51 Best Albums of 2022	47	
The Independent	The best albums of 2022	11	

== Commercial performance ==
This Is What I Mean debuted at number one on the UK Albums Chart, moving 27,800 album-equivalent units in its first week, becoming Stormzy's third consecutive number-one album. The 27,800 units consisted of 13,977 CDs, 3,316 vinyl albums, 1,139 cassettes, 1,488 digital downloads and 7,954 sales-equivalent streams.

The singles "Hide & Seek" and "Firebabe", along with another album track, charted on the UK Singles Chart: "Hide & Seek" (7), "Firebabe" (5), and "This Is What I Mean" (32). UK chart rules prevent artists from having more than three songs in the top 40 at once; Stormzy's album would have generated further entries in the countdown without these rules.

== Track listing ==
This Is What I Mean track listing
No.	Title	Writer(s)	Producer(s)	Length
1.	"Fire + Water"	Michael Omari; Ras Kassa Alexander	PRGRSHN; Kz	8:17
2.	"This Is What I Mean" (featuring Amaarae, Black Sherif, Ms Banks and Storry)	Omari; Jacob Collier; Richard Isong	P2J; Knox Brown^{[a]}; Joel Peters^{[a]}; PRGRSHN^{[a]}	5:24
3.	"Firebabe" (featuring Debbie)	Omari; Debbie Ehirim; George Moore; Collier; Alexander; Simon Tendai Senyange	Moore; Daniel Buhlebuyeza Miles^{[a]}; Peters^{[a]}; Jojo Mukeza^{[a]}; PRGRSHN^{[a]}; Tendai^{[a]}	3:40
4.	"Please"	Omari; Owen Cutts; Reuben James	Cutts	2:53
5.	"Need You" (featuring Tendai and Ayra Starr)	Omari; Alexander; Isong; Senyange	P2J; Tendai; Juls^{[a]}; Tempoe^{[a]}; PRGRSHN^{[a]}	3:16
6.	"Hide & Seek"	Omari; Andrew Jason Brown; Ayanna Christie Brown; Cutts; Alexander; Isong; Temilade Openiyi	P2J; PRGRSHN; Cutts^{[c]}; Calum Landau^{[v]}	3:28
7.	"My Presidents Are Black"	Omari; Alexander; Daniela Rathana	PRGRSHN; Peters^{[a]}	4:22
8.	"Sampha's Plea" (featuring Sampha)	Omari; Cutts; James; Sampha Sisay	Cutts	2:45
9.	"Holy Spirit"	Omari; Dion Wardle; Alexander	PRGRSHN; Wardle	4:42
10.	"Bad Blood" (featuring Nao)	Omari; Daniel Traynor; Isong; Michael Orabiyi	GRADES; Scribz Riley; P2J^{[a]}; PRGRSHN^{[a]}	4:03
11.	"I Got My Smile Back" (featuring India.Arie)	Omari; Ehirim; Collier; Isong	P2J; Peters^{[a]}; PRGRSHN^{[a]}	4:11
12.	"Give It to the Water" (featuring Debbie & Jacob Collier)	Omari; Ehirim; Wardle; Collier	Wardle	4:12
Total length:				51:13

== Personnel ==
Musicians

- Stormzy – vocals
- Jack Shepherd – acoustic guitar (tracks 1, 6, 9), electric guitar (1, 3, 6, 7)
- Marco Bernardis – alto saxophone (1), flute (1), tenor saxophone (7)
- Debbie Ehirim – background vocals (1, 3), vocals (3, 12)
- Jacob Collier – background vocals (1–4, 11), piano (4, 8), vocals (12)
- Kz – background vocals, programming (1)
- Sampha – background vocals (1, 3), vocals (8)
- Tendai – background vocals (1), programming (1, 3), bass guitar (2), piano (3), vocals (5); additional vocals, keyboards (10)
- Prgrshn – programming (1, 5, 7), bass guitar (1, 5), piano (1, 2), percussion (1), keyboards (5–7, 9, 10, 11)
- Aaron Blake – piano (1)
- Joel Peters – programming (1, 3–7, 10), piano (1, 3), bass guitar (3, 12), keyboards (7, 12)
- Calum Landau – programming (1, 3, 5–7, 10), bass guitar (3, 10, 11)
- Gabriele Pribetti – saxophone (1)
- Knox Brown – background vocals (2)
- Storry – background vocals (2)
- P2J – programming (2, 5, 6, 10, 11), bass guitar (2, 5, 10), drums (2)
- Dave Daniels – cello (2)
- Llinos Richards – cello (2)
- Magda Pietraszewska – cello (2)
- Victoria Harrild – cello (2)
- Laurence Ungless – double bass (2)
- Steve Williams – double bass (2)
- Julian Hinton – strings (2, 3, 11); orchestra contractor, orchestra leader (2); programming (11)
- Laurie Anderson – viola (2)
- Lydia Lowndes-Northcott – viola (2)
- Nick Barr – viola (2)
- Paul Livingston – viola (2)
- Anna Croad – violin (2)
- Cathy Thompson – violin (2)
- Emma Fry – violin (2)
- Henry Salmon – violin (2)
- Jackie Roche – violin (2)
- Jamie Hutchinson – violin (2)
- Janice Graham – violin (2)
- Jo Archard – violin (2)
- Kirsty Mangan – violin (2)
- Martin Lissola – violin (2)
- Natalia Bonner – violin (2)
- Stephanie Benedetti – violin (2)
- Steve Morris – violin (2)
- Tom Kemp – violin (2)
- Amaarae – vocals (2)
- Black Sherif – vocals (2)
- Ms Banks – vocals (2)
- Jojo Mukeza – electric guitar, programming (3)
- George Moore – piano (3, 11), programming (3)
- Ras Kassa Alexander – piano (3)
- Stephanie Hatchman – background vocals (4)
- Linden Jay – bass guitar (4, 8)
- Dion Wardle – keyboards (4, 8), piano (5, 8, 9, 12)
- Owen Cutts – keyboards (4, 8), background vocals (6)
- Godwin Sonzi – guitar (5)
- Juls – programming (5)
- Sheila Maurice-Grey – trumpet (5)
- Ayra Starr – vocals (5)
- Oxlade – background vocals (6)
- Teni – background vocals (6)
- Äyanna – background vocals (6, 7)
- Abdala Elamin – background vocals (7)
- Maleik Loveridge – choir (7), background vocals (9)
- Naomi Parchment – choir (7), background vocals (9)
- Olivia Williams – choir (7), background vocals (9)
- Serena Prince – choir (7), background vocals (9)
- Akin Amusan – choir (7)
- Cherice Voncelle – choir (7)
- Daniel Arieleno – choir (7)
- James Thompson – choir (7)
- Kieran Briscoe – choir (7)
- Nathaniel Warner – choir (7)
- Nicholas Brown – choir (7)
- Patrick Linton – choir (7)
- Paul Lee – choir (7)
- Renee Fuller – choir (7)
- Taneka Duggan – choir (7)
- India Arie – vocals (11)

Technical

- Dale Becker – mastering
- Naweed – mastering, CD Album / Singles
- Leandro "Dro" Higaldo – mixing (1, 2, 5–7, 10, 11)
- Alex Ghenea – mixing (3, 9)
- Mark "Spike" Stent – mixing (4, 8, 12)
- Joel Peters – engineering
- Calum Landau – engineering (3, 6, 12), engineering assistance (1, 2, 4, 5, 7–11)
- Mat Bartram – engineering (3)

== Charts ==
Chart performance for This Is What I Mean
Chart (2022)	Peak position
Australian Albums (ARIA)	72
Belgian Albums (Ultratop Flanders)	58
Danish Albums (Hitlisten)	25
Dutch Albums (Album Top 100)	48
German Albums (Offizielle Top 100)	96
Irish Albums (OCC)	10
New Zealand Albums (RMNZ)	40
Scottish Albums (OCC)	5
Swedish Albums (Sverigetopplistan)	40
Swiss Albums (Schweizer Hitparade)	35
UK Albums (OCC)	1
UK Album Downloads (OCC)	1
UK R&B Albums (OCC)	1

== Certifications ==
Certifications for This Is What I Mean
Region	Certification	Certified units/sales
United Kingdom (BPI)	Silver	60,000^{‡}
^{‡} Sales+streaming figures based on certification alone.
