= Jacob Collier =

English musician (born 1994)

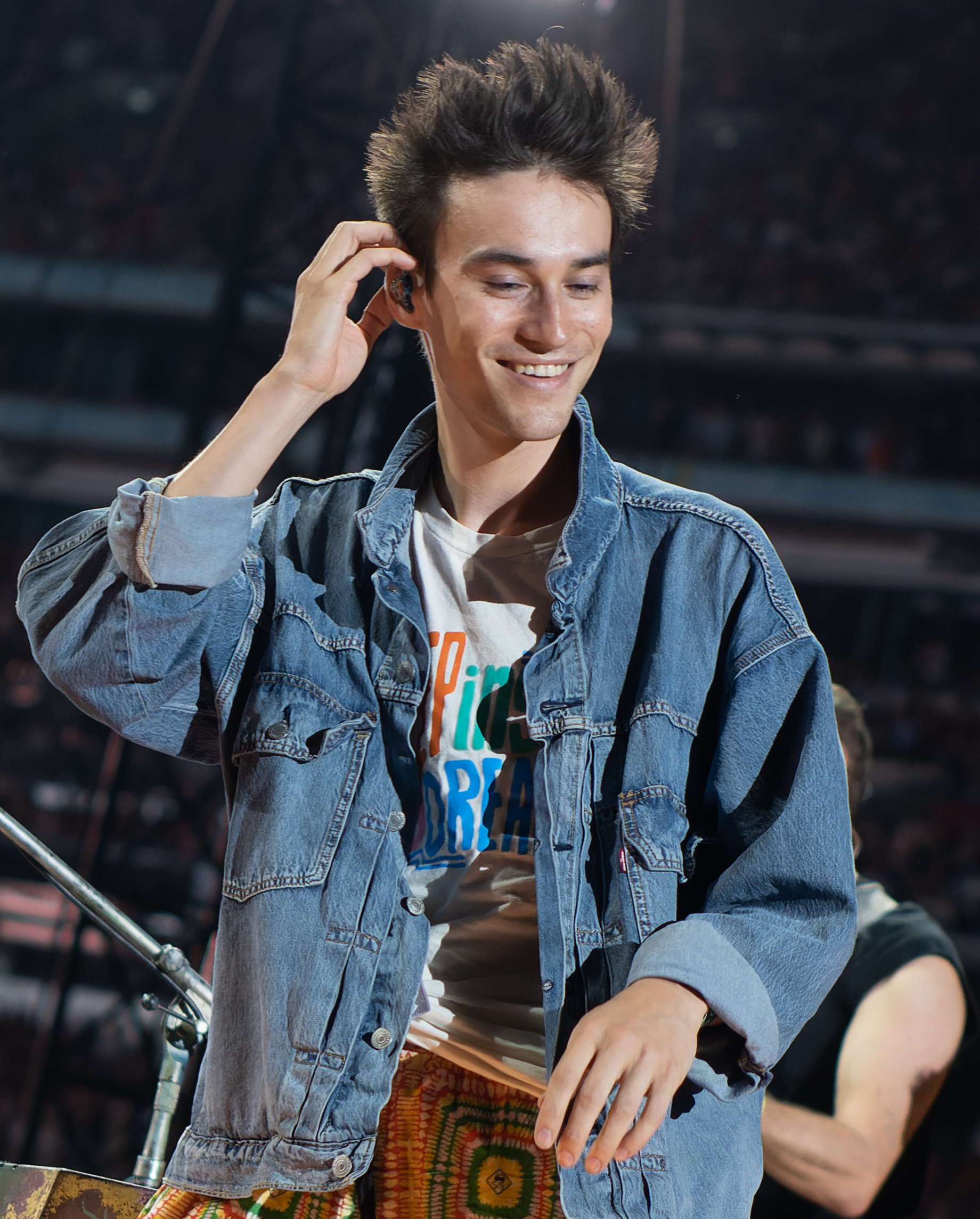
- Collier in 2022

Background information
- Born: Jacob Moriarty; 2 August 1994 (age 32); London, England
- Genres: Jazz; rhythm and blues; folk; avant-garde; jazz fusion; experimental pop
- Occupations: Singer; songwriter; multi-instrumentalist; record producer
- Instruments: Vocals; keyboards; guitar; double bass; bass guitar; drums; percussion; ukulele; harpejji; melodica
- Years active: 2002–present
- Labels: Interscope; Hajanga
- Website: jacobcollier.com

Jacob Collier (né Moriarty; born 2 August 1994) is an English singer, songwriter, multi-instrumentalist, producer and educator. His music incorporates a combination of jazz and elements from other musical genres, and often features extensive use of reharmonisations and close harmony. He is known for his energetic live performances, in which he often conducts the audience to sing harmony or play percussion parts.

In 2013, his split screen video covers of popular songs, such as Stevie Wonder's "Don't You Worry 'bout a Thing", began to go viral on YouTube. In 2014, Collier became friends with Herbie Hancock and Quincy Jones after they heard and saw his video cover of Stevie Wonder's song. Collier decided to stay independent and produce his first album. He originally sang all the harmony and played all the instruments on his songs. In 2016, Collier released his debut album, In My Room, which he recorded, arranged, performed and produced himself in the back room of his family home in Finchley, North London.

In 2018, Collier began working on Djesse, a four-volume, 50-song album featuring more than two dozen artists and ensembles. The first volume, which featured the Metropole Orkest, Djesse Vol. 1, was released in December 2018. The second, Djesse Vol. 2, used more acoustic instrumentation and was released in July 2019. The third volume, Djesse Vol. 3, was released in 2020. The fourth and final volume for the album, Djesse Vol. 4, was released in March 2024.

In 2017, Collier was awarded Grammy Awards for his arrangements of the "Flintstones" theme and Stevie Wonder's "You and I" on his first album. In 2020, Collier won Grammy Awards for his arrangements of "All Night Long (All Night)" from Djesse Vol. 1 and "Moon River" from Djesse Vol. 2. In 2021, he won a Grammy Award for "He Won't Hold You" from Djesse Vol. 3., making him the first British artist to receive a Grammy Award for each of his first four albums. In 2025, he won his seventh Grammy for "Bridge Over Troubled Water" from Djesse Vol. 4 in the Best Arrangement, Instrumental, or A Cappella category, extending his record to five consecutive albums with at least one Grammy win.

== Background ==
=== Early years and education ===
Jacob Moriarty was born on 2 August 1994. He grew up in North London with two younger sisters. His mother, Suzie Collier, is a violinist, conductor, and professor at the Royal Academy of Music's Junior Academy. His maternal grandfather, Derek Collier, was a violinist who taught at the Royal Academy and performed with orchestras around the world.

Collier has said: "We sing Bach chorales together as family—it's just so much fun." He is of Chinese descent through his maternal grandmother, Leila Wong. At 10, Collier portrayed Tiny Tim in the Arthur Allan Seidelman film A Christmas Carol (2004). At the same time he was performing as a treble singer in classical roles, like one of the three boys in Mozart's The Magic Flute and Miles in Benjamin Britten's The Turn of the Screw, which influenced his use and understanding of harmony. Of Britten's harmonic language, he said, "My mind was shattered outwards."

Collier attended Mill Hill County High School in north London, and the Purcell School for Young Musicians in Bushey, Hertfordshire. He briefly studied jazz piano at the Royal Academy.

=== 2011–2015: Early videos ===
Collier began uploading homemade, multi-instrumental content to YouTube in 2011 with a vocal arrangement of "Pure Imagination" from the 1971 film Willy Wonka and the Chocolate Factory, and in 2013 a multi-instrumental rendition of Stevie Wonder's "Don't You Worry 'bout a Thing". The videos presented split-screen multitrack recordings of Collier singing each part of the arrangements' harmonies. These videos gained attention with the "Don't You Worry 'bout a Thing" cover receiving millions of views. His musical activity caught the attention of Quincy Jones, who flew Collier to the Montreux Jazz Festival where he was introduced to Herbie Hancock.

In 2015, Collier launched a live show and toured Europe and the US. The performances featured a circle of musical instruments, with six simultaneous looping stations capable of simultaneous playback, backed by synced real-time 3D-captured video loops, projected onto a screen behind the instruments. Central to the show was a custom-built vocal "Harmonizer" instrument that enabled Collier to sing multi-voice harmonies in real-time. The show debuted at Ronnie Scott's Jazz Club in London, and Collier later opened for Herbie Hancock and Chick Corea at the 2015 Montreux Jazz Festival.

=== 2015–2018: In My Room, world tour, and #IHarmU ===
In July 2015, Beats by Dr. Dre asked Collier to provide music for "The Game Starts Here" England Rugby World Cup campaign commercial. Collier recorded an a cappella version of the hymn "Jerusalem" for the commercial, which was shown on national television before each England match.

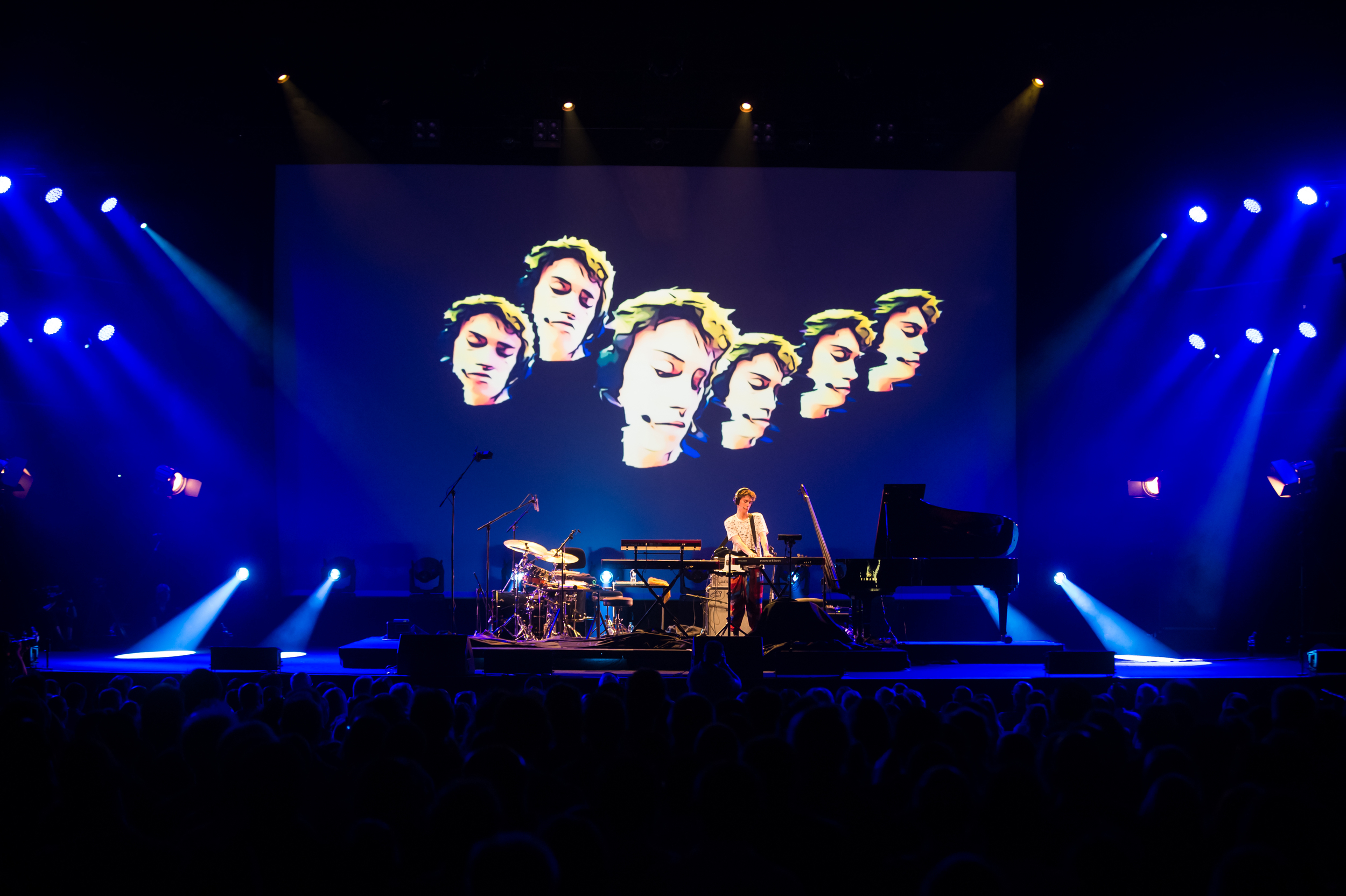
Jacob Collier's live solo show in Montreux, Switzerland, July 2015

In late 2015, Collier began preparing his debut album In My Room after performing with WDR Big Band in a concert in Cologne, Germany. He wrote eight of the eleven songs and arranged, recorded and produced the album in the music room of his family home, playing every instrument himself. He recorded and mixed the album over three months. The album was mastered by Bernie Grundman and released on 1 July 2016 through independent record label Membran Entertainment Group. Collier embarked on a one-man world tour which included the 2016 Montreux Jazz Festival.

In anticipation of the album's release, Collier launched the "#IHarmU" campaign through Patreon. 100 patrons sent him 15-second video clips of melodies, which he harmonised with vocal parts on his multi-screen layout and uploaded to social media. Collier received more than 130 melodies and donations, including from British jazz artist Jamie Cullum, Ben Folds, Herbie Hancock, and Kevin Olusola of the a cappella group Pentatonix. He arranged "White Christmas" for them; it appeared on A Pentatonix Christmas and won a Contemporary A Cappella Society award for Best Professional Arrangement by a Non-Scholastic Group. In February 2016, Collier was featured on Snarky Puppy's album Family Dinner – Volume 2, playing "Don't You Know." On 22 August, he took part in a Quincy Jones tribute concert at the BBC Proms in the Royal Albert Hall in London, in which he performed, among others, his orchestral arrangement of his original song "In The Real Early Morning" with the Metropole Orkest, conducted by Jules Buckley.

In December 2016, Collier collaborated with 150 students at MIT to produce a live concert in Kresge Auditorium, titled "Imagination Off the Charts", playing alongside orchestral arrangements of his repertoire. This residency was the subject of a documentary film, Imagination Off The Charts, which won a regional Emmy in June 2018. In February 2017, Collier won two Grammy Awards for Best Arrangement, Instrumental or A Cappella for the Stevie Wonder song "You and I", and Best Arrangement, Instrumental and Vocals for a cover of "Flintstones". In March he made his US television debut on The Tavis Smiley Show, performing "You and I" with jazz-gospel a cappella group Take 6. Collier re-composed Samsung's signature ringtone, "Over The Horizon", for the Samsung Galaxy S8/S8+, and was co-producer on two songs from Becca Stevens' album Regina. He helped to score the DreamWorks' film The Boss Baby with composer Hans Zimmer. He performed with Zimmer and Pharrell Williams at Coachella Valley Music and Arts Festival.

Collier toured internationally for two and a half years between 1 July 2015 and 18 December 2017, while hosting masterclasses and performances with orchestras and big bands around the world, including the Metropole Orkest. On 9 July, he and Cory Henry performed with the Metropole Orkest and Jules Buckley at the North Sea Jazz Festival. In July 2018, he was one of the guests at Quincy Jones' 85th birthday party celebrations at the Montreux Jazz Club. On 19 July, "Jacob Collier and Friends" performed as part of the BBC Proms at the Royal Albert Hall in London.

=== 2018–2024: Djesse series ===
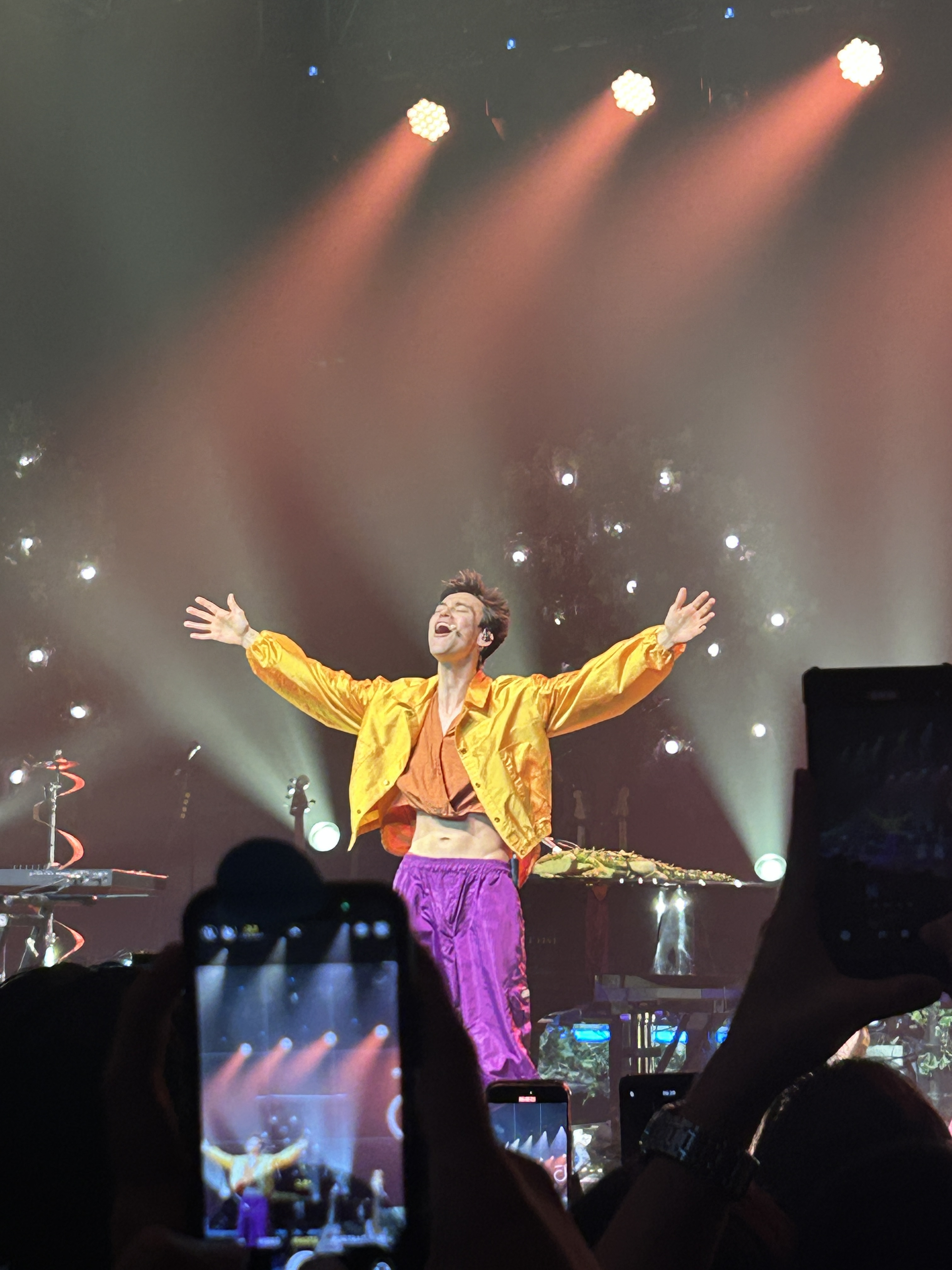
Collier performing at the New Frontier Theater in Manila, Philippines, June 2025

On 29 October 2018, Collier announced a new four-volume, 50-song musical project, titled Djesse. He titled it as such as a reference to his initials: JC (Djesse, with a silent "D", is pronounced like "JC"). Djesse Vol. 1 was released in full on 7 December, and featured the singles "With The Love in My Heart", "Ocean Wide, Canyon Deep" and "All Night Long". The volume features collaborations with various artists and includes The Metropole Orkest on every track. Collier produced, arranged, and orchestrated the music, in addition to singing and playing various instruments. In January 2019, Collier embarked on a world tour in support of the Djesse series.

Djesse Vol. 2 was released on 19 July 2019, featuring musical collaborations with various artists as well as an a cappella arrangement of "Moon River" with over a hundred vocal contributions from family members, mentors, friends, and other collaborators. At the 62nd Annual Grammy Awards, Djesse Vol. 1 and Vol. 2 each won a Grammy award for "All Night Long" and "Moon River", respectively. Also in 2019, Collier provided backing vocals for several tracks on Coldplay's eighth studio album, Everyday Life.

Djesse Vol. 3, released on 14 August 2020, features collaborations with various artists and received several Grammy nominations in 2021. It was nominated for the Album of the Year, and the single "All I Need" was nominated for Best R&B Performance. "He Won't Hold You" won Best Arrangement, Instrumental and Vocals, making Collier the first British artist to win a Grammy Award for each of his first four albums. In November 2020, Collier released the book Songs of Jacob Collier, featuring solo piano and vocal arrangements for 19 of his compositions. Collier co-wrote and provided background vocals for SZA's single "Good Days," released on 25 December 2020. He also contributed background vocals to Coldplay and BTS's "My Universe", which topped the Billboard Hot 100 in October 2021. This track is part of Coldplay's ninth album Music of the Spheres, which also features Collier on the track "Human Heart." In 2022, he collaborated with British rapper Stormzy on the album This Is What I Mean. Collier received two nominations at the 65th Grammy Awards: Best Arrangement, Instruments And Vocals for his single "Never Gonna Be Alone" and Album Of The Year for his contributions to Music of The Spheres. Additionally, he appeared in Olivia Rodrigo's documentary film Olivia Rodrigo: Driving Home 2 U as one of the special guests.

On 2 May 2022, Collier was the subject of Alan Yentob's BBC One television documentary series Imagine..., in the episode Jacob Collier: In the Room Where It Happens. On 29 September 2022, Collier released his first live album, Piano Ballads (Live From The Djesse World Tour 2022), which includes 11 covers largely improvised by Collier on stage, many of which involve a spontaneous audience choir. On 8 December 2023, Collier performed "Last Christmas" at the Royal Christmas Concert at Westminster Abbey. At the 2024 Grammy Awards, Collier won the Best Arrangement, Instrumental and Vocals award for "In the Wee Small Hours of the Morning". He also performed at the Grammy Awards ceremony, playing "Both Sides Now" with Joni Mitchell, Brandi Carlile, Allison Russell, SistaStrings, Blake Mills, and Lucius.

Djesse Vol. 4 was released on 29 February 2024. The singles include "Little Blue", featuring Brandi Carlile; "Wherever I Go", "Witness Me", "Mi Corazón", and a cover of Simon & Garfunkel's "Bridge Over Troubled Water". That same year, he collaborated with Aurora on a mashup of his song "A Rock Somewhere" and her "The Seed", performed in the Arctic to raise awareness for ocean and climate protection. On 9 October 2024, Collier released Djesse Vol. 4 (Deluxe), which contains all tracks from the original release along with four additional tracks "to conclude the journey of Djesse".

=== 2025: The Light For Days ===
Jacob Collier released a new album The Light for Days on 10 October 2025. Collier stated that "since completing the Djesse album series, one of the things I've most wanted to focus on, and explore deeply, is the limitation of a single instrument." To that end, The Light for Days is the result of a self-imposed challenge to write a full-length album in just four days, using only his voice and his unique 5-string guitar, an instrument that he conceptualized and helped to create. Because of the extremely short timeline, Collier mentioned, "I had to work so fast that I couldn't second-guess anything – I just had to roll with and trust the process."

In May 2026, Berklee College and New York University awarded him an honorary degree.

== Musical style and influences ==
Collier comes from a family of musicians and was introduced to music at an early age. With the support of his mother, he learned to play various instruments and became acquainted with musical concepts. His recording career began in the family home, in a room filled with instruments where his mother used to teach violin lessons. He recorded himself singing and playing instruments, mostly covers of jazz standards or pop songs, using a split screen recording technique to display his vocals, and uploaded the recordings to YouTube. The videos featured use of reharmonisation, close harmony, dissonance, microtonality, and polyrhythms.

His more recent releases, which were also uploaded to streaming services, featured unconventional musical elements such as microtonality and complex chords and progressions, as well as sudden key and time signature changes. His style blended classical music with modern jazz, pop and R&B, experimental music, and synthwave.

== Discography ==
=== Studio albums ===
List of studio albums, with selected details and chart positions
Title	Album details	Peak chart positions						
Title	Album details	US Heat.	US Indie	US Cont. Jazz	US Jazz	US Classical	US Classical Cross.	US Folk Sales
In My Room	Released: 1 July 2016; Label: Membran; Formats: CD, LP, digital download, streaming	10	50	1	3	—	—	—
Djesse Vol. 1 (with the Metropole Orkest conducted by Jules Buckley)	Released: 7 December 2018; Label: Hajanga Records, Geffen Records, Decca Records; Formats: CD, LP, digital download, streaming	14	—	1	6	6	6	—
Djesse Vol. 2	Released: 19 July 2019; Label: Hajanga, Geffen, Decca; Formats: CD, LP, digital download, streaming	—	—	—	—	—	—	18
Djesse Vol. 3	Released: 14 August 2020; Label: Hajanga; Formats: CD, LP, digital download, streaming	—	—	—	—	—	—	—
Djesse Vol. 4	Released: 29 February 2024; Label: Hajanga; Formats: CD, LP, digital download, streaming	—	—	—	—	—	—	—
The Light for Days	Released: 10 October 2025; Label: Hajanga; Formats: CD, LP, digital download, streaming	—	—	—	—	—	—	—
"—" denotes items which were not released in that country or failed to chart.

=== Live albums ===
List of live albums, with selected details
Title	Details
Piano Ballads (Live from the Djesse World Tour 2022)	Released: 29 September 2022; Label: Decca; Format: Digital download, streaming

=== Extended plays ===
List of extended plays, with selected details
Title	Details
Pure Imagination -the hit covers collection-	Released: 20 September 2017 (in Japan only); Label: P-VINE Records; Format: CD, Digital download, streaming
Jacobean Essentials	Released: 18 December 2020; Label: Hajanga; Format: Digital download, streaming
Jacobean Chill	Released: 25 December 2020; Label: Hajanga; Formats: Digital download, streaming
Three Christmas Songs - An Abbey Road Live To Vinyl Cut	Released: 22 November 2024; Label: Hajanga; Formats: Vinyl, Digital download, streaming

=== Non-album singles ===
Title	Year	Writer(s)	Ref.
"Don't You Worry 'bout a Thing"	2013	Stevie Wonder	
"Fascinating Rhythm"	2014	George Gershwin, Ira Gershwin (lyrics)	
"Close to You"	2014	Burt Bacharach, Hal David	
"One Day" (performed with Nikki Yanofsky)	2015	Jacob Collier, Nikki Yanofsky	
"Jerusalem"	2015	Hubert Parry, William Blake (poem)	
"In the Bleak Midwinter"	2016	Harold Darke, Christina Rossetti (poem)	
"Bathtub" (featuring Becca Stevens)	2017	Jacob Collier, Becca Stevens	
"I Love Being Here With You" (Soundtrack for the All-New Electric Fiat 500 campaign)	2020	Bill Schluger, Peggy Lee	
"The Christmas Song (Chestnuts Roasting On An Open Fire)"	2020	Mel Tormé, Robert Wells	
"The Sun Is In Your Eyes"	2021	Jacob Collier	
"Flow Freely" (From the Film "Reflection: A Walk with Water") (with Justin Kauflin)	2021	Jacob Collier, Justin Kauflin	
"Fix You" (Live for There With Care)	2021	Chris Martin, Guy Berryman, Jonathan Buckland, Will Champion	

=== Guest appearances ===
Title	Year	Other artist(s)	Album	Ref.	Notes
"In The Thick Of It"	2013	Jason Rebello	Anything But Look		
"Circle Song"	2015	Misha Mullov-Abbado	New Ansonia		
"Lock, Stock & Shuffle"	2015	Misha Mullov-Abbado	New Ansonia		
"Real Eyes Realise Real Lies"	2015	Misha Mullov-Abbado	New Ansonia		
"New Ansonia"	2015	Misha Mullov-Abbado	New Ansonia		
"Satan, Oscillate My Metallic Sonatas"	2015	Misha Mullov-Abbado	New Ansonia		
"Ode To King Michael"	2015	Misha Mullov-Abbado	New Ansonia		
"Heal Me On This Cloudy Day"	2015	Misha Mullov-Abbado	New Ansonia		
"September"	2015	Misha Mullov-Abbado	New Ansonia		
"Just Another Love Song"	2015	Misha Mullov-Abbado	New Ansonia		
"For the Longest Time"	2015	Natalie Williams	Kaleidoscope		
"Don't You Know"	2016	Snarky Puppy, Big Ed Lee	Family Dinner – Volume 2		
"Señor Blues"	2016	Dominick Farinacci	Short Stories		
"Somebody That I Used to Know"	2016	Dominick Farinacci	Short Stories		
"Tomorrow (A Better You, a Better Me)"	2016	John Aram, Rootwords, The Children of the International School of Geneva	—N/a		
"White Christmas" (Arrangement)	2016	Pentatonix, The Manhattan Transfer	A Pentatonix Christmas		
"Both Still Here"	2017	Becca Stevens	Regina		
"As"	2017	Becca Stevens	Regina		
"Drive (live)"	2017		Open Road (Amazon Original )		
"She's Gotta Be Somewhere" (Backing vocals)	2017	David Crosby	Sky Trails		
"Under the Sea"	2017		Jazz Loves Disney 2 - A kind Of Magic		
"Silent Night"	2017	Justin Kauflin	Silent Night		
"Restore the Feeling"	2019	Daniel Caesar, Sean Leon	Case Study 01		
"Church" (Backing vocals)	2019	Coldplay	Everyday Life		Also co-writer
"Cry Cry Cry" (Backing vocals)	2019	Coldplay	Everyday Life		Also co-writer
"Everyday Life" (Backing vocals)	2019	Coldplay	Everyday Life		
"Slow Burn"	2020	Becca Stevens	Wonderbloom		
"Noelle"	2020	JoJo	December Baby		
"Good Days" (Backing vocals)	2020	SZA	SOS		Also co-writer
"Higher Power (acoustic version)" (Piano)	2021	Coldplay	—N/a		
"Blue Straggler" (Backing vocals)	2021	Mark Lettieri, Travis Toy	Deep:The Baritone Sessions Vol.2		
"If You Want to Sing Out, Sing Out"	2021	James Marsden, Ariana Greenblatt	The Boss Baby: Family Business (Original Motion Picture Soundtrack)		
"Independent Girl"	2021	Jonah Nilsson	Now Or Never		
"Altar" (Backing vocals)	2021	Kehlani	Blue Water Road		Also co-writer
"My Universe" (Backing vocals)	2021	Coldplay, BTS	Music of the Spheres		
"Human Heart"	2021	Coldplay, We Are King	Music of the Spheres		
"Reflection" (Backing vocals)	2021	Terrace Martin, James Fauntleroy	DRONES		
"erase me"	2021	Lizzy McAlpine	Five Seconds Flat		
"roses in the rain (lullaby)" (Backing vocals)	2021	Christina Perri	songs for rosie		
"Old Memories (Unlocked)" (Backing vocals and piano)	2021	Alicia Keys	Keys		Also co-writer
"Thalamus Canticum"	2021	Stian Carstensen	Musical Sanatorium		
"Champions" (Backing vocals)	2022	Ty Dolla $ign, Wiz Khalifa	—N/a		Also co-writer, co-composer
"Motion"	2022	Gabriel Grossi, Seamus Blake	Plural		Also co-writer, co-composer
"Where Do We All Go" (Backing vocals)	2022	Tank and the Bangas	Red Balloon		Also co-writer, co-composer
"Fire + Water" (Backing vocals)	2022	Stormzy	This Is What I Mean		
"This Is What I Mean" (Backing vocals)	2022	Stormzy, Black Sherif, Amaarae, Ms Banks, Storry	This Is What I Mean		Also co-writer, co-composer
"Firebabe" (Backing vocals)	2022	Stormzy, Debbie	This Is What I Mean		Also co-writer, co-composer
"Please" (Backing vocals and keyboard)	2022	Stormzy	This Is What I Mean		
"Sampha's Plea" (Keyboard)	2022	Stormzy, Sampha	This Is What I Mean		
"I Got My Smile Back" (Backing vocals)	2022	Stormzy, India Arie	This Is What I Mean		Also co-writer, co-composer
"Give It To The Water" (Backing vocals)	2022	Stormzy, Debbie	This Is What I Mean		Also co-writer, co-composer
"If a tree falls in love with a river"	2023	Lau Noah	A Dos		
"Always"	2023	Victor Franco	Self Portrait		
"Yes Man" (Backing vocals and villiette guitars)	2023	Victoria Canal, S. Carey	WELL WELL		
"In the Wee Small Hours of the Morning"	2023	säje	säje		
"Hello You" (Backing vocals)	2024	Mr Cutts	Postcards		Also co-writer, co-composer
"I'm So Happy" (Backing vocals)	2024	Mr Cutts	Postcards		Also co-writer, co-composer
"Found You First" (Backing vocals and keyboard)	2024	Alec Benjamin	—N/a		
"Tangerine Rays" (Backing vocals)	2024	ZEDD, Ellise, Bea Miller	Telos		
"JUPiTER" (Backing vocals)	2024	Coldplay	Moon Music		Also co-composer
"AETERNA" (Backing vocals)	2024	Coldplay	Moon Music		
"A Wave" (Backing vocals)	2024	Coldplay, Jon Hopkins	Moon Music (Full Moon Edition)		
"Better Man" (Backing vocals, guitar, harp, piano)	2025	Robbie Williams	Better Man (Original Motion Picture Soundtrack)		
"From" (Backing vocals)	2025	Bon Iver	Sable, Fable		

== Acting and opera credits ==
=== Film ===
As Jacob Moriarty
Year	Title	Role	Notes
2004	A Christmas Carol	Tiny Tim	
2005	The Best Man	Olly Aged 10	

=== Television ===
As Jacob Moriarty
Year	Title	Role	Notes
2006	The Virgin Queen	Little Boy	Episode 1

=== Opera ===
As Jacob Moriarty
Year	Production	Role	Theatre	Ref(s)
2002	Wozzeck	Child	Royal Opera House	
2007	The Magic Flute	First Boy	London Coliseum	
2007	The Turn of the Screw	Miles	London Coliseum	

== Awards and nominations ==
=== Grammy Awards ===
Year	Category	Work	Result	Ref
2017	Best Arrangement, Instruments and Vocals	"Flintstones"	Won	
2017	Best Arrangement, Instrumental or A Cappella	"You and I"	Won	
2020	Best Arrangement, Instrumental or A Cappella	"Moon River"	Won	
2020	Best Arrangement, Instruments and Vocals	"All Night Long"	Won	
2021	Best Arrangement, Instruments and Vocals	"He Won't Hold You"	Won	
2021	Album of the Year	Djesse Vol. 3	Nominated	
2021	Best R&B Performance	"All I Need" (featuring Ty Dolla Sign & Mahalia)	Nominated	
2022	Best R&B Song	"Good Days" (with Solána Rowe, Carlos Núñez Muñoz, Carter Lang, and Christopher Ruelas)	Nominated	
2022	Best Arrangement, Instruments and Vocals	"The Christmas Song (Chestnuts Roasting On An Open Fire)"	Nominated	
2023	Album of the Year (Note: as featured artist)	Music of the Spheres (by Coldplay)	Nominated	
2023	Best Arrangement, Instruments and Vocals	"Never Gonna Be Alone"	Nominated	
2024	Best Arrangement, Instruments and Vocals	"In the Wee Small Hours of the Morning" (with Erin Bentlage, Sara Gazarek, Johnaye Kendrick & Amanda Taylor)	Won	
2025	Album of the Year	Djesse Vol. 4	Nominated	
2025	Best Global Music Performance	"A Rock Somewhere" (featuring Anoushka Shankar & Varijashree Venugopal)	Nominated	
2025	Best Arrangement, Instrumental or A Cappella	"Bridge over Troubled Water" (with John Legend and Tori Kelly)	Won	
2026	Best Arrangement, Instruments and Vocals	"Keep An Eye On Summer"	Nominated	

=== Jazz FM Awards ===
Year	Category	Result	Ref
2016	Breakout Artist of the Year	Nominated	
2016	Digital Initiative of the Year (Sponsored by 7digital)	Won	
2019	PRS For Music Gold Award	Won	
2020	The Digital Award	Nominated	

=== MOBO Awards ===
Year	Category	Result	Ref
2016	Best JAZZ Act	Nominated	

=== UK Music Video Awards ===
Year	Category	Work	Result	Ref
2025	Best Live Video	"A Rock Somewhere" x "The Seed" (for Greenpeace) (with Aurora)	Nominated	

== See also ==
- List of British Grammy winners and nominees
