= Britten Sinfonia =

Chamber orchestra

- Chamber orchestra
- Founded: 1992; 33 years ago
- Location: Cambridge, England, United Kingdom
- Website: www.brittensinfonia.com

Britten Sinfonia is a chamber orchestra ensemble based in Cambridge, UK. It was created in 1992, following an initiative from Eastern Arts and a number of key figures including Nicholas Cleobury, who recognised the need for an orchestra in the East of England. It is a flexible ensemble composed of chamber musicians in Europe. The players are freelance musicians who are employed on a project-by-project basis and the ensemble performs around 70 concerts per year and works with hundreds of people in the communities where the orchestra is resident.

The orchestra is named after the composer Benjamin Britten, who lived in the East of England. It is a registered charity.

== Background ==
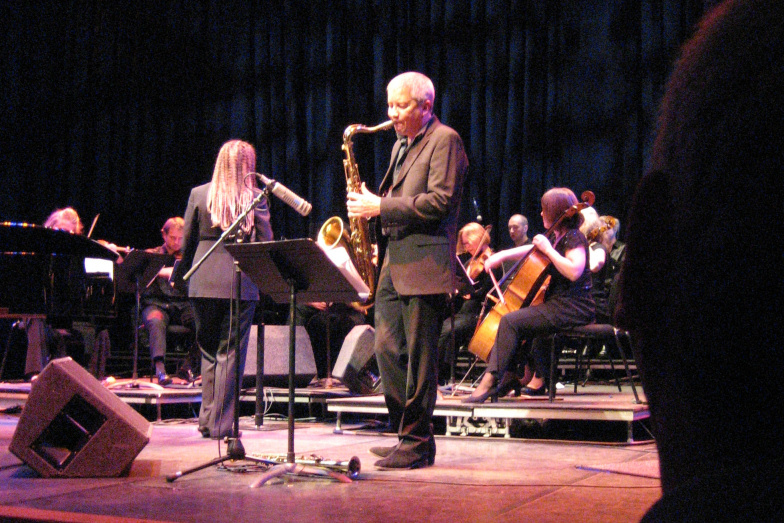
Britten Sinfonia and guests perform at the London Jazz Festival.

The orchestra does not have a principal conductor but works with a range of international guest artists from across the musical spectrum as suited to each project.

Recent seasons have included projects with Brad Mehldau, Thomas Adès, Pierre-Laurent Aimard, James MacMillan, Ian Bostridge, Joanna MacGregor, Mahan Esfahani, Masaaki Suzuki, Polyphony, director Katie Mitchell, Imogen Cooper, Dhafer Youssef, These New Puritans, Jaga Jazzist and Rufus Wainwright. In 2013–14 Britten Sinfonia collaborated with artists including Paul Lewis, Ian Bostridge, Netia Jones, Mark Padmore, Pekka Kuusisto, Iestyn Davies, Patricia Kopatchinskaja and the Richard Alston Dance Company with premières from composers including Sally Beamish, Roderick Williams, Mark Simpson, Brett Dean and Philip Cashian.

Britten Sinfonia performs in concert halls around Europe and festivals and is a regular at the BBC Proms and has residencies in Cambridge, Norwich, and Brighton with a concert series at London's Barbican Centre and Wigmore Hall. The ensemble has an international profile, a highlight being a tour of South America, and is frequently heard on disc, BBC Radio 3 and commercial radio. The orchestra has received awards including a Gramophone Award and in 2007 won the Royal Philharmonic Society Ensemble Award in recognition of its work.

In August 2020, Meurig Bowen took up the post of chief executive and artistic director. Bowen was previously head of Artistic Planning at the BBC National Orchestra and Chorus of Wales, and director of Cheltenham Music Festival.

== Creative learning ==
The Creative Learning department of the Sinfonia provides educational support to the mainstream concert season. These activities involve:

- Pre-concert talks
- The SinfoniaCast, a podcast featuring interviews with guest artists and composers
- Projects specifically for young people and schools
- Family Music Days, and
- Music-based training for businesses and corporations.

All of these activities are led by Britten Sinfonia's musicians and associated composers and workshop leaders. For audiences of all ages and levels of experience, the Creative Learning programme offers opportunities to meet, talk to and work with performers and composers; discover more about the ensemble's wide-ranging repertoire; and develop new musical knowledge and skills.

== Reviews and quotes ==
"... infused with irresistible energy ... cogent and compelling" – The Times

"Britten Sinfonia has quietly established itself as one of the countries most flexible chamber orchestras" – Evening Standard

== See also ==
- Thomas Gould (violinist)
