= Justin Kauflin =

American songwriter

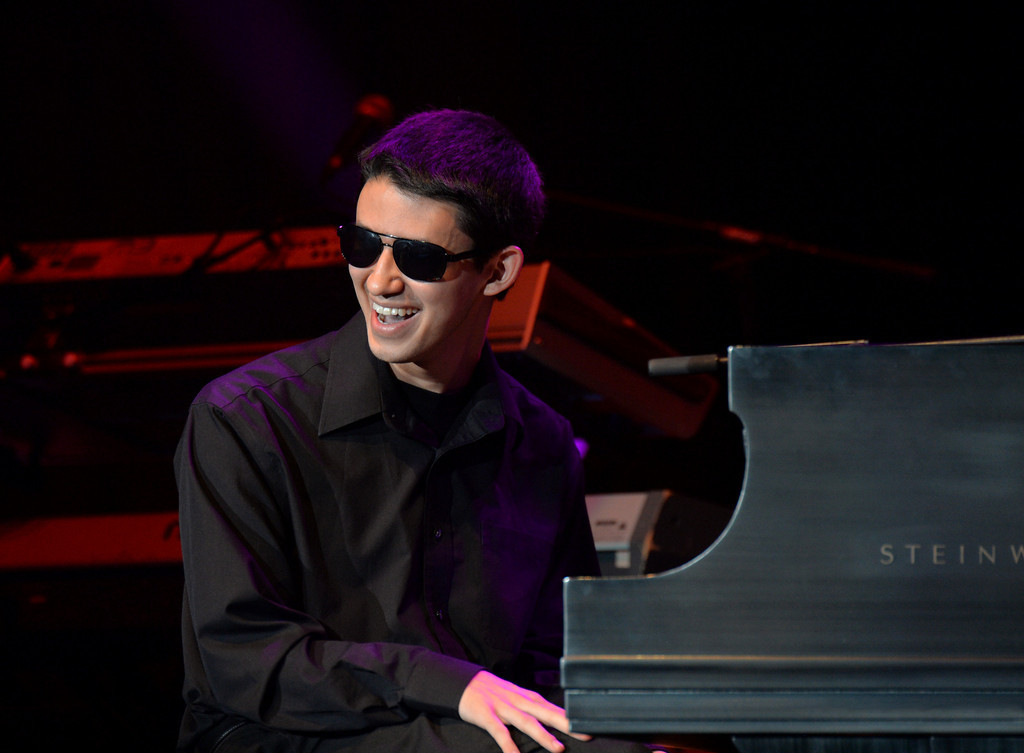
- Justin Kauflin on Quincy Jones' 2013 World Tour

Background information
- Born: March 10, 1986 (age 40); Silver Spring, Maryland, U.S.
- Genre: Jazz
- Occupation: Musician
- Instrument: Piano
- Years active: 2001–present
- Labels: Qwest, Harmonia Mundi/Jazz Village, Justin Kauflin Music
- Website: www.justinkauflin.com

Justin Kauflin (born March 10, 1986) is an American jazz pianist, composer, educator and record producer.

== Career ==
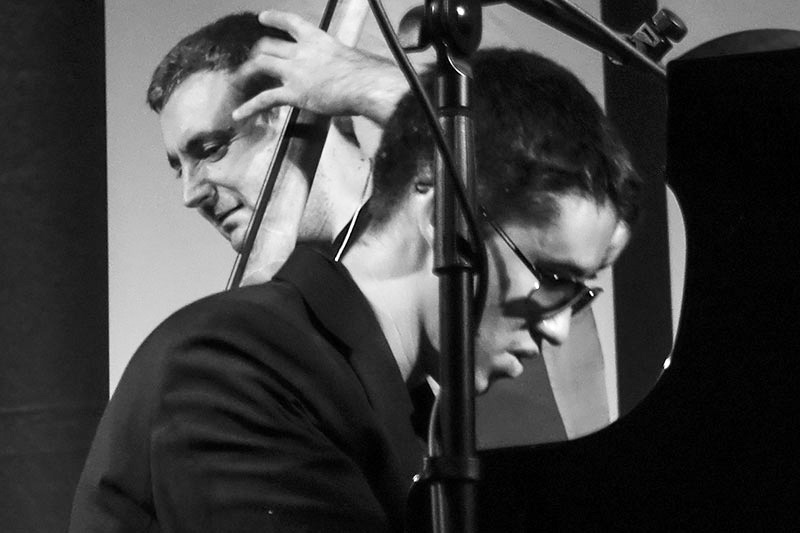
Justin Kauflin and Thomas Fonnesbæk in Denmark in 2016

Justin Kauflin was born in Silver Spring, Maryland before moving to Virginia Beach, Virginia with his family. As a child he learned classical music on violin and piano. Starting at the age of six, he was performing in concerts, nursing homes, and weddings, eventually becoming concertmaster for several orchestras.

When Kauflin was eleven, he lost his eyesight due to proliferative exudative retinopathy. He adjusted by learning Braille and cane mobility, and switching to jazz piano at the Governor's School for Performing Arts. He studied with Liz Barnes and John Toomey, a professor of jazz at Old Dominion University. In jazz festivals throughout the U.S. he received top honors and began performing professionally at the age of fifteen with the Jae Sinnett Trio.

In 2004 Kauflin graduated in the top 1% at Salem High School with an Advanced Academic diploma and Valedictorian at the Governor's School for the Arts, receiving a Presidential scholarship to attend William Paterson University. in New Jersey. At the university, his mentor was Clark Terry, and he played in the Clark Terry Ensemble. He was also influenced by Harold Mabern and Mulgrew Miller.

In 2008 he moved to New York City and at age 23 produced, led, composed, and performed on his first album, Introducing Justin Kauflin.

Kauflin's relationship with Clark Terry was depicted in the documentary Keep On Keepin' On, which made its world premiere at the Tribeca Film Festival April 2014 and won both Heineken Audience and Best New Documentary Director Awards. Kauflin is credited for the film score with Dave Grusin. Keep On Keepin' On won the Tribeca Film Festival Audience Award.

Beginning in 2011, Kauflin performed with his own trio, as well as the Jae Sinnett Trio, in clubs in Virginia and across the country. He won the VSA International Young Soloist Award, was selected as semifinalist in the Thelonious Monk Competition in 2011, voted as "Jazz Artist of the Year" in VEER magazine, and was hired by Quincy Jones. From 2013 to 2014 he was part of Jones's world tour in Switzerland, France, Korea, and Japan. He worked with Jones on the album Dedication (2015). Following the release, his trio performed in festivals, concerts, and clubs in Europe and America (2015-2019).

Since the release of Keep On Keepin' On Justin has gone on to record on 13 more albums, six of those as leader or co-leader - Silent Night, Coming Home, Synesthesia, Standards, and his first live recording Justin Kauflin Trio Live at Sam First and the single, Flow Freely.

In 2015, Kauflin participated in the commemorative album Oscar, With Love, a collection of previously unrecorded songs written by jazz pianist Oscar Peterson.

After completing an extensive CD release world tour for Coming Home (Jan-Feb 2019), he recorded music for separate projects that have been put on hold. In 2021, Justin collaborated with Jacob Collier on the documentary Reflection - A Walk with Water as well as the theme song, Flow Freely. He also completed original film score for My Sister Liv, produced by Al Hicks and Paula DuPre Pesman.

== Discography ==
=== As leader ===
- Introducing Justin Kauflin (Justin Kauflin Music, 2010)
- Justin Kauflin Live at The Edye Broad Stage EP (Qwest, 2014)
- Dedication (Qwest/Harmonia Mundi, 2015)
- Synesthesia (Thomas Fonnesbaek & Justin Kauflin - Storyville, 2017)
- Silent Night (Justin Kauflin Music, 2017)
- Coming Home (Justin Kauflin Music/Qwest, 2018)
- Christmas Candy EP (Justin Kauflin Music, 2019)
- Flow Freely Jacob Collier/Justin Kauflin (Single, 2021)
- Justin Kauflin Trio Live at Sam First (Sam First Records 2023)
- Danish Rain (Storyville 2023)

=== As sideman ===
- Frank Hauch (Frank Hauch, 2004)
- Sinnett Hearings (JNett, 2005)
- Equilibrium (Etan Haziza, 2007)
- An Evening with the Jae Sinnett Trio DVD (JNett, 2009)
- Roxy Coss (Roxy Coss, 2010)
- Theatre (Jae Sinnett, 2010)
- Old School Loyalty (House and Sinnett, 2011)
- Still Standing (Jae Sinnett, 2012)
- This Just In (Brian McCarthy, 2014)
- See Dream Blues (Rob DuGuay, 2014)
- CT and WP: A Perfect Match (Clark Terry, 2014)
- When Trees Speak (Jimmy Masters, 2014)
- Subject to Change (JNett, 2014)
- Keep On Keepin' On Soundtrack (Varèse Sarabande, 2015)
- Safe in Sound (Rob Duguay, 2016)
- Oscar, with Love (Kelly Peterson, 2016)
- The Better Angels of Our Nature (Brian McCarthy, 2017)
- Offbeat (Katie Thiroux, 2017)
- Codex (Brian McCarthy, 2017)
- Americana Groove Project (Jae Sinnett, 2018)
- Sharing (Thomas Fonnesbaek, 2018)
- Crossing the Water (Christopher Brydge, 2020)
- Sun Song (Christopher Brydge, 2022)
- Acceptance (Eddie Williams, 2023)
- After | Life (Brian McCarthy, 2023)
- BeeDubyah (Billy Williams, 2023)

== Original film scores ==
- Keep On Keepin' On (Radius, 2015)
- Meet Kandice (There with Care Promo, 2016)
- Meaningful Connections (There with Care Promo, 2017)
- Caring for Families (There with Care Promo, 2018)
- Community of Care (There with Care Promo, 2019)
- Continuing the Care (There with Care Promo, 2020)
- Delivering Care During Covid (There with Care Promo, 2020)
- Care Makes a Difference (There with Care Promo, 2021)
- Continuing the Care (There with Care Promo, 2021)
- Meet Antonio and His Mom (There with Care Promo, 2022)
- Reflection - A Walk with Water (Documentary 2021)
- My Sister Liv (Al Hicks & Paula DePre Pesman - Documentary, 2022)
- 12 Notes on Life and Creativity (Quincy Jones - trailer 2022)
- Nespresso Unforgettable Taste (Nestle commercial, 2023)

== Film music contributions ==
- Blue's Big City Adventure (Nickelodeon, 2023)
- Full Circle (2023)
- 12 Notes on Life and Creativity (Quincy Jones - audiobook 2022)
