= In My Room (album) =

Studio album by Jacob Collier
- Released: 1 July 2016
- Studio: Jacob Collier's home studio in London
- Genre: Jazz
- Length: 58:52
- Label: Membran International; Must Have Jazz.; Qwest
- Producer: Jacob Collier

Jacob Collier chronology
In My Room (2016)	Djesse Vol. 1 (2018)

Professional ratings
Review scores
Source	Rating
AllMusic	3/5 stars
The Guardian	4/5 stars
The Irish Times	4/5 stars
The Times	3/5 stars

In My Room is the debut album by Jacob Collier, released on 1 July 2016. The album is a collection of original pieces and covers, including a cover of "In My Room", a song by the Beach Boys. In February 2017, two of the songs on this album won Grammy Awards: Best Arrangement, Instrumental or A Cappella for the Stevie Wonder song "You and I" and Best Arrangement, Instrumental and Vocals for a cover of "Flintstones", the theme song from the 1960s television series The Flintstones. For this album, Collier won the 2016 Jazz FM "Digital Initiative of the Year". It also was number one on the Billboard Contemporary Jazz Charts.

He began working on the album in late 2015, after performing with the WDR Big Band in a concert in Cologne, Germany. He arranged, recorded and produced the album entirely on his own, playing every instrument heard in the album. As part of the creation of the album, he created a new instrument called the "Harmoniser", a synthesiser which samples the voice of an artist in real time, so that the artist can sing harmonies live. Out of the eleven songs on the album, he wrote eight. The album was recorded and mixed in a three-month period in the music room of his family home in London, England, hence the title. The album cover is an image of the family music room, with several of the instruments used in the album. It was mastered by Bernie Grundman. Following the release, Collier embarked on a world tour with his one-man show, which included playing at the 2016 Montreux Jazz Festival.

== Track listing ==
All tracks are written by Jacob Collier, except where noted.

In My Room track listing
No.	Title	Writer(s)	Length
1.	"Woke Up Today"		4:40
2.	"In My Room"	Brian Wilson; Gary Usher	4:49
3.	"Hideaway"		6:52
4.	"You and I"	Stevie Wonder	4:20
5.	"Down the Line"		6:39
6.	"Now and Then I Think About You"		0:53
7.	"Saviour"		6:08
8.	"Hajanga"		6:03
9.	"Flintstones"	Hoyt Curtin; Joseph Barbera; William Hanna	3:10
10.	"In the Real Early Morning"		6:09
11.	"Don't You Know"		9:09
Total length:			58:52

== Personnel ==
Adapted from album's liner notes.

- Jacob Collier – vocals, instruments, arrangements, engineering, and producing
- Ben Bloomberg – balance engineer
- Alfredo Pasquel – assistant engineer
- Bernie Grundman – mastering engineer

== Charts ==
Chart performance for In My Room
Chart (2016)	Peak position
US Heatseekers Albums (Billboard)	10
US Independent Albums (Billboard)	50
US Top Jazz Albums (Billboard)	3
US Top Contemporary Jazz Albums (Billboard)	1
