= Thomas Gould (violinist) =

- Born: 1983 (age 41–42); London, England
- Instrument: Violin
- Website: http://www.thomasgould.com/

Thomas Gould (born 1983) is a British violinist and the leader of Britten Sinfonia, as well as former leader of Aurora Orchestra. Gould is best known for his playing of the classical music repertoire although he also plays a six-string electric violin and has performed jazz at Ronnie Scott's. He has performed at the Royal Albert Hall, Barbican Centre and Royal Festival Hall in London, as well as Bridgewater Hall, Manchester Arena, Symphony Hall, Birmingham and National Indoor Arena.

== Early life and education ==
Gould was born in London in 1983. He lives in Camden, London and is the younger brother, by fifteen years, of Clio Gould, lead violinist with the Royal Philharmonic Orchestra. He studied with György Pauk at the Royal Academy of Music from the age of 16. He credits his sister with his choice of career, telling The Daily Telegraph in April 2011 "[…] it was inspirational, but more in a social than a musical way. Clio was always bringing these really lively, interesting people home to rehearse. It seemed an exciting life she was leading, and I wanted to do something similar."

== Career ==
Gould takes an eclectic approach to music, with Fiona Maddocks describing him in UK Sunday newspaper The Observer as, "[…] a top soloist, happy to tackle old or new in concert hall or tramshed with symphony orchestra or accordion".

In 2009, aged 25, he was elected Associate of the Royal Academy of Music.

In 2011, Gould toured with the Australian Chamber Orchestra as both soloist and guest director. In June of the same year, Decca Classics released the Aurora Orchestra's recording of Nico Muhly's Seeing is Believing on which Gould played a six-string electric violin made by John Jordan; the recording was voted the iTunes Contemporary Classical Album of the Year. He premiered Harrison Birtwistle's Oboe Quartet the same month.

His début with the Los Angeles Philharmonic, in 2012, was conducted by John Adams.

In February 2013, Gould busked at Westminster Underground Station in an attempt by the London Evening Standard to recreate The Washington Post's Joshua Bell experiment of 2007.

In May 2013, Gould discussed his musical approach with Christopher Morely of the Birmingham Post, saying, "It was much later that I began to apply this knowledge to the violin, having always – wrongly – thought that the violin wasn’t a jazz instrument. Now I'm in the luxurious position of being able to get up and jam at Ronnie Scott's Jazz Club having just played a recital at Wigmore Hall. But I'm definitely a classical violinist first and foremost. I think my classical playing has benefited massively from working with musicians outside classical music. If I wrote a list of great musicians I've been lucky enough to work with the list would include Brad Mehldau and Radiohead as well as more expected names like Sir Mark Elder and Sir Colin Davis. I think as long as I continue to be inspired by other genres then I will continue to be a genre-crossing violinist."

Writing in UK daily newspaper The Guardian in November 2014, Gould said,

My own career is a fairly equal division between solo work and orchestral leading (with Aurora and Britten Sinfonia), with as much jazz and chamber music as time allows. I love the balance. I get to play pretty much the entire repertoire for the instrument, from Beethoven trios to Mahler symphonies to recording with Radiohead. I’m constantly playing new repertoire and working with new colleagues. That's an enormous privilege. It might mean feeling stressed at times for having multiple projects on the go simultaneously, but it means you never get that stagnant feeling of giving the umpteenth performance of the same concerto in a season. It makes it much easier to play in a way that's fresh, spontaneous and alive. If, as a performer, you enjoy what you are doing, then your audience will too.

Gould has performed as soloist and director with Sinfonietta Riga, with whom he recorded Beethoven's Violin Concerto and Ralph Vaughan Williams' The Lark Ascending. In addition to his classical performances, he was a member of the Man Overboard swing quintet until February 2016 (he retired saying that he is too busy with classical music, and was replaced by Fiona Monbet) and has worked with Radiohead, Rufus Wainwright and Sigur Rós.

== Selected discography ==
- Seeing is Believing by Nico Muhly (with Aurora Orchestra and Nicholas Collon). Decca Classics, June 2011, ASIN: B004P1YX3U
- Bach to Parker. Champs Hill, July 2014, ASIN: B00LFX1J56
- Triplicity (with Jim Rattigan and Liam Noble). Pavillon Records, October 2014, ASIN: B00NBFARIG
- Goldberg Variations (BWV 988) by J.S. Bach arr Dmitry Sitkovetsky (with Britten Sinfonia). Harmonia Mundi, March 2015, ASIN: B00R8BLKSA
- Live in Riga (with Sinfonietta Riga). Edition Classics, 2015, ASIN: B00VEFZ4YM
