= Djesse Vol. 1 =

Studio album by Jacob Collier with Metropole Orkest
- Released: 7 December 2018
- Genre: Jazz fusion; R&B; classical; Gnawa
- Length: 53:16
- Label: Hajanga; Decca; Geffen
- Producer: Jacob Collier

Jacob Collier chronology
In My Room (2016)	Djesse Vol. 1 (2018)	Djesse Vol. 2 (2019)

Singles from Djesse Vol. 1
- 1. "With the Love in My Heart" Released: 2 November 2018; 2. "Ocean Wide, Canyon Deep" Released: 29 November 2018; 3. "All Night Long" Released: 29 November 2018

Metropole Orkest chronology
What Heat (2018)	Djesse Vol. 1 (2018)	Melkweg (2019)

Professional ratings
Review scores
Source	Rating
The AU Review	4.5/5 stars
DownBeat	3.5/5 stars
The Guardian	3/5 stars
Sungenre	4.5/5 stars
The Times	3/5 stars

Djesse Vol. 1 (/ˈdʒɛsi/ JESS-ee) is the second studio album by Jacob Collier and the first album in the Djesse series, released on 7 December 2018. The album features the Metropole Orkest. Djesse is a collection of four volumes which was announced 29 October 2018. Each record represents a different part of the day, with the first record describing daybreak. The title Djesse is a reference to Collier's own initials. Djesse with a silent D sounds like JC.

The songs in this volume feature numerous styles, and reviewers have drawn parallels to such composers and musicians as Stravinsky and J Dilla. The third track, "With the Love in My Heart", was released 2 November 2018 as a single, in anticipation of the album's release. Two further singles, "Ocean Wide, Canyon Deep" and "All Night Long", were released on 29 November. The volume features collaborations with Voces8, Laura Mvula, Hamid El Kasri, Take 6, and Collier's mother, Suzie Collier. The Metropole Orkest is featured heavily throughout the record, appearing on every track other than "Home Is". Collier produced, arranged and orchestrated the music himself.

The album was number one on the Billboard Contemporary Jazz chart. The track "All Night Long" won the award for Best Arrangement, Instrumental and Vocals at the 62nd Annual Grammy Awards.

Prior to the album's release, Collier had performed all the songs except for the first three tracks live at his BBC Proms concert in July 2018. On the day after the release of the album, before starting on his Djesse world tour, he performed the volume with musicians from both Berklee College of Music and MIT.

== Track listing ==
All tracks are written by Jacob Collier, except where noted.

Djesse Vol. 1 track listing
No.	Title	Writer(s)	Length
1.	"Home Is"		5:45
2.	"Overture"		2:54
3.	"With the Love in My Heart"		6:48
4.	"Ocean Wide, Canyon Deep" (featuring Laura Mvula)		5:19
5.	"Djesse"		4:36
6.	"Everlasting Motion" (featuring Hamid El Kasri)	Collier; Hamid El Kasri	6:33
7.	"Every Little Thing She Does Is Magic"	Gordon Matthew Thomas Sumner	4:38
8.	"Once You" (featuring Suzie Collier)		9:24
9.	"All Night Long" (featuring Take 6)	Lionel Richie	7:19
Total length:			53:16

== Personnel ==
Adapted from the album's liner notes and TIDAL.

- Jacob Collier – vocals, instruments, engineering, producing, arrangements, orchestrations, mixing

Additional musicians

- The Aeolians of Oakwood University – additional vocals (9)
  - Alaysia Bookal, Aleigha Durand, Allayna O'Quinn, Andre Smith, Asriel Davis, Asya Bookal, Briana Marshall, Carl Reed, Celine Sylvester, Chad Lupoe, Charles Wallington, Chesroleeysia Bobb, Cleavon Davis, Cole Henry, Dominique DeAbreu, Haley Flemons, Hector Jordan, Holland Sampson, Jason Max Ferdinand, JoPaul Scavella, Jonathan Mills, Jourdan Bardo, Kashea Whyte, Keviez Wilson, Kobe Brown, Kristin Hall, Leonard Brown, Lincoln Liburd, Maia Foster, Malia Ewen, Malik George, Malik Mchayle, Marc Simons, Marissa Wright, Matthew Cordner, Mykel Robinson-Collins, Naomi Parchment, Natrickie Louissant, Patricia Williams, Roddley Point Du Jour, Samara Bowden, Samella Carryl, Terell Francis-Clarke, Zarren Bennett
- Stefan Behrisch – orchestrations
- Ella Collier – additional vocals (3, 4)
- Sophie Collier – additional vocals (3, 4)
- Suzie Collier – additional vocals (3, 4), featured violin (8)
- Metropole Orkest – orchestra (2-9)
  - Jules Buckley – conductor, orchestrations
  - Arlia de Ruiter, Casper Donker, Christina Knoll, David Peijnenborgh, Denis Koenders, Ewa Zbyszynska, Francoise van Varsseveld, Giles Francis, Henriette Luytjes, Herman van Haaren, Jasper van Rosmalen, Merel Jonker, Pauline Terlouw, Robert Baba, Ruben Margarita, Sarah Koch, Suzie Collier, Vera Laporeva, Wim Kok, Yannick Hiwat – violin
  - Alex Welch, Iris Schut, Isabella Petersen, Julia Jowett, Mieke Honingh, Norman Jansen, Wouter Huizinga – viola
  - Annie Tangberg, Emile Visser, Jascha Albracht, Maarten Jansen, Sebastian de Rode – cello
  - Arend Liefkes, Boris Oostendorp, Erik Winkelmann – double bass
  - Janine Abbas, Liset Pennings, Mariël van den Bos – flute
  - Willem Luijt – oboe
  - David Kweksilber, Leo Janssen, Marc Scholten, Max Boeree, Paul van der Feen, Sjoerd Dijkhuizen – clarinet, saxophone
  - Fons Verspaandonk, Lies Molenaar, Petra Botma, Pieter Hunfeld, Sander van Dijk, Wendy Leliveld – horn
  - Angelo Verploegen, Jo Hermans, Martijn de Laat, Nico Schepers, Ray Bruinsma, Rik Mol, Ruud Breuls – trumpet
  - Frederik Heirman, Jan Bastiani, Jan Oosting, Martijn Sohier – trombone
  - Bart van Gorp, Martin van den Berg – bass trombone
  - Ries Schellekens – tuba
  - Eddy Koopman, Frank Wardenier, Murk Jiskoot – percussion
  - Joke Schonewille – harp
  - Hans Vroomans – piano
- Robin Mullarkey – additional bass (4, 7, 9)
- Vladimir Nikolov – orchestrations
- Damiano Pascarelli – orchestrations
- Take 6 – vocals (9)
  - Claude V. McKnight III, Mark Kibble, David Thomas, Joey Kibble, Khristian Dentley, Alvin Chea
- VOCES8 – vocals (1)
  - Andrea Haines, Eleonore Cockerham, Chris Wardle, Katie Jeffries-Harris, Barnaby Smith, Blake Morgan, Sam Dressel, Rob Clark, Christopher Moore, Jonathan Pacey

Additional technical personnel

- Ben Bloomberg – recording engineer (1), orchestra recording engineer (2-9), mix engineer
- Jim Clements – vocal producer (1)
- Bernie Grundman – mastering engineer
- Jack Mills – assistant recording engineer (1)
- George Oulton – Pro Tools operator (1)
- Dirk Overeem – orchestra assistant recording engineer (2-9)
- Paul Pouwer – orchestra recording engineer (2-9)
- Barnaby Smith – vocal producer (1)

== Charts ==
Chart performance for Djesse Vol. 1
Chart (2018)	Peak position
US Heatseekers Albums (Billboard)	14
US Top Classical Albums (Billboard)	6
US Top Classical Crossover Albums (Billboard)	6
US Top Jazz Albums (Billboard)	6
US Top Contemporary Jazz Albums (Billboard)	1
