= Fab Dupont =

French record producer

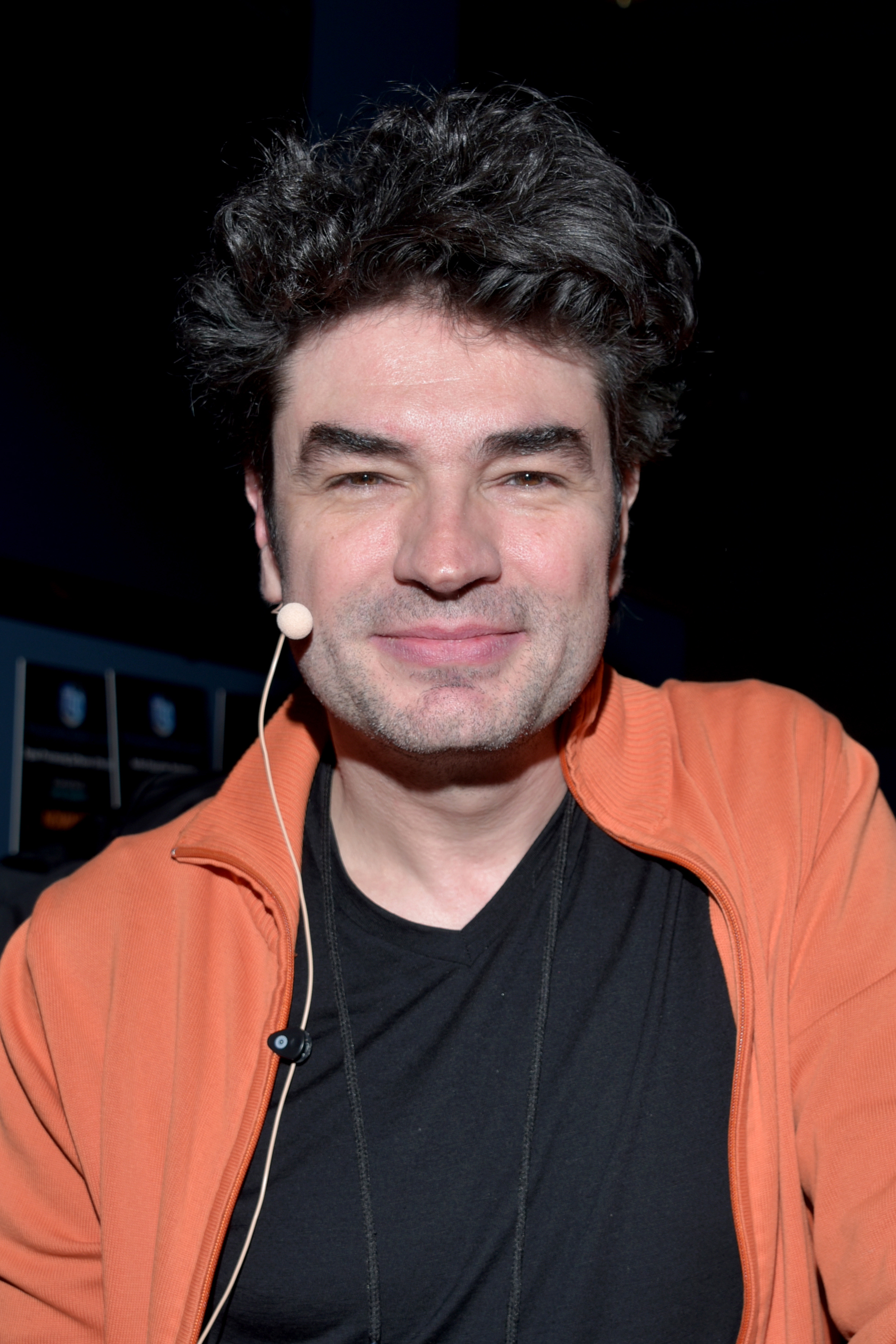
- Fab Dupont at the NAMM Show January 2020

Background information
- Born: Fabrice Dupont; Canada
- Genres: Pop, dance, electronic, rock, jazz, folk
- Occupations: Mixing engineer, record producer, educator, musician
- Instruments: Saxophone, piano, bass, vocals
- Years active: 2001–present
- Website: fabulousfab.com

Fabrice Dupont, known as Fab Dupont, is a French mixing engineer, record producer, and educator. Born in Canada and raised in Paris, he later moved to Boston to study songwriting at Berklee College of Music before settling in New York City.

Dupont has written, recorded, produced, and mixed for artists including Bad Bunny, Shakira, Raew Alejandro, Jennifer Lopez, Juan Luis Guerra, Em Beihold, Nat King Cole, adore, Asking Alexandria, Monsieur Periné, Vicente Garcia, Julien Doré, André 3000, Lolo Zouaï, Bebel Gilberto, Blu DeTiger and David Crosby.

== Other projects ==
Dupont worked with Lauten Audio founder Brian Loudenslager in the development of the Lauten Atlantis microphone and the Lauten Eden microphone in order to create a design that would be versatile enough to handle the rigors of the modern DAW-based recording environment.

== Production credits ==
Selected production credits:

| Artist | Record | Year | Producer | Mixing | Recording | Mastering | Awards | Other |
|---|---|---|---|---|---|---|---|---|
| Toots and the Maytals | True Love | 2004 | No | No | Yes | No | Won Best Reggae Album at the 2004 Grammys | |
| Third World Love (Avishai Cohen, Omer Avital, Yonathan Avishai, Daniel Freedman) | Avanim | 2004 | No | Yes | No | No | | |
| Kirk Whalum | Kirk Whalum Performs the Babyface Songbook | 2005 | No | Yes | Yes | No | | |
| Philip Swanson | Lengthening Shadows | 2008 | No | No | Yes | No | | |
| Nat King Cole | Re:Generations | 2009 | No | Yes | No | No | | |
| Santigold | Santigold | 2008 | No | Yes | No | No | | |
| Jennifer Lopez | Brave | 2008 | No | Yes | No | No | | |
| Dede | Secrets | 2010 | No | Yes | No | No | | |
| Shakira featuring Freshlyground | "Waka Waka (This Time for Africa)" | 2010 | Add'l | Yes | No | No | Won NRJ Music Award for International Song of the Year, Billboard Music Award for Top Latin Song | |
| Freshlyground | Radio Africa | 2010 | Yes | Yes | No | No | Won South African Music Awards Best Engineer, Best Adult Contemporary Album, Nominated for Record of The Year and Best Video. | |
| Kirk Whalum | Everything Is Everything: The Music of Donny Hathaway | 2010 | No | No | No | No | Nominated for Best Pop Instrumental Album at the 2010 Grammys Nominated for Best R&B Vocal Performance at the 2010 Grammys | |
| The Knocks | Magic | 2011 | Vocal | No | No | No | | |
| The Dø | Both Ways Open Jaws | 2011 | No | No | No | Yes | | |
| Les Nubians | Nu Revolution | 2011 | Yes | Yes | No | No | | |
| Sarah Elizabeth Foster | Take Me for a Ride | 2011 | No | Yes | No | Yes | | |
| Sara Leib | Secret Love | 2012 | No | Yes | No | No | | |
| Grégoire Maret | Grégoire Maret | 2012 | No | Yes | No | No | | |
| Sofia Rei | De Tierra y Oro | 2012 | Co. | Yes | No | No | Won Best World Beat Album at the 2012 Independent Music Awards Won Best World Beat Song at the 2012 Independent Music Awards | |
| Tiny Hearts | Stay | 2013 | No | No | No | Yes | | |
| Bob Reynolds | Somewhere in Between | 2013 | No | Yes | No | No | | |
| Banda Magda | Amour, t'es là? | 2013 | No | Yes | No | No | | |
| Wakey Wakey | Salvation | 2014 | Yes | Yes | Yes | No | | Executive producer, synthesizer |
| Jay Stolar | More Than We Think | 2014 | Add'l | Yes | Yes | No | | |
| Cyrille Aimée | It's a Good Day | 2014 | Yes | Yes | Yes | No | | |
| The Dø | Shake Shook Shaken | 2014 | No | Yes | No | Yes | Won Best Rock album at the 2015 Victoires de la Musique | Additional keyboards (track 6) |
| Banda Magda | Yerakina | 2014 | Yes | Yes | No | No | | |
| The Arrows | Disaster Queen | 2014 | Yes | Yes | No | No | | |
| Clément Jacques | Indien | 2014 | No | Yes | No | No | | |
| Monsieur Periné | Caja de Música | 2015 | No | Yes | No | No | Nominated for Album of the Year at the 2015 Latin Grammys Nominated for Best Latin Alternative Album at the 2015 Grammys | |
| Colt Silvers | Swords | 2015 | Co. | Yes | No | No | | |
| David Crosby | Lighthouse | 2016 | Yes | Yes | Yes | No | | |
| Cyrille Aimée | Let's Get Lost | 2016 | Yes | Yes | Yes | No | | |
| Jeremie Kisling | Malhabiles | 2016 | Yes | Yes | No | No | | |
| Chambao | Nuevo Ciclo | 2016 | No | Yes | No | No | | |
| Jeanne Added | Be Sensational | 2016 | No | No | No | Yes | Prix de l'Artiste et l'Album Rock de l’année – catégorie Indé et le prix de la Révélation française | |
| Thomas Azier | Rouge | 2017 | Add'l | Yes | No | Yes | | |
| Samo and Alejandra Guzmán | "Te Juro" | 2017 | Yes | Yes | Yes | No | | Composer |
| Banda Magda | Tigre | 2017 | Co. | Yes | No | No | | |
| The Dø | Live at l'Olympia, Paris | 2017 | No | No | No | Yes | | |
| Silvina Moreno | Sofá | 2017 | No | Yes | No | No | | |
| Tim Dup | Mélancolie Heureuse | 2017 | Add'l | Yes | No | No | | |
| Diana Fuentes | La Gravedad | 2018 | No | Yes | No | No | | |
| Wynton Marsalis | United We Swing | 2018 | No | No | No | No | | Alto saxophone |
| Susana Baca | Susana Baca | 2018 | Co. | Yes | Yes | No | | |
| Doc Gynéco | 1.000% | 2018 | Co. | Yes | No | No | | |
| David Crosby, Michael League, Becca Stevens, and Michelle Willis | Here If You Listen | 2018 | Yes | Yes | Yes | No | | |
| Monsieur Periné | Encanto Tropical | 2018 | No | Yes | No | No | Nominated for Album of the Year at the 2018 Latin Grammys Nominated for Record of the Year at the 2018 Latin Grammys Nominated for Best Latin Alternative Album at the 2018 Grammys | |
| Trending Tropics | Trending Tropics | 2018 | Co. | Yes | Yes | No | | Tenor saxophone (track 13) |
| Ulrich Foreman | Chapter III / A Perfect Storm | 2018 | Yes | Yes | No | No | | |
| Vicente García and Juan Luis Guerra | Loma de Cayenas | 2018 | No | Yes | No | No | | |
| Tmboy | Steam | 2019 | No | Yes | No | No | | |
| Lolo Zouaï | High Highs to Low Lows | 2019 | No | Yes | No | No | | Arranger |
| Vicente García | Candela | 2019 | No | Yes | No | No | Nominated for Best Contemporary Tropical / Fusion Album at the 2019 Latin Grammys Nominated for Record of the Year at the 2019 Latin Grammys Nominated for Best Tropical Latin Album at the 2019 Grammys | Composer (track 12) |
| Terrenoire | Les Forces Contraires | 2020 | No | Yes | No | No | Won Best New Artist at the 2022 Victoires de la Musique | |
| Prudence | Be Water | 2020 | Yes | Yes | No | No | | Composer, Clapping, keyboards |
| Clément Jacques | Chromatique | 2020 | No | Yes | No | No | | |
| Nesrine | Nesrine | 2020 | No | Yes | No | Yes | | |
| Cabra | Cabra | 2021 | No | Yes | No | No | Nominated for Best Alternative album at the 2019 Latin Grammys | |
| Susana Baca | Palabras Urgentes | 2021 | Co. | Yes | No | No | Nominated for Best Folk Album at the 2022 Latin Grammys | |
| Snarky Puppy | Empire Central | 2022 | No | Immersive | No | No | Won for best Jazz Instrumental album at the 2023 Grammys | |
| Em Beihold | Egg in the Backseat | 2022 | No | Immersive | No | No | | |
| The Hu | Rumble of Thunder | 2022 | No | Immersive | No | No | | |
| Lolo Zouaï | Playgirl | 2022 | No | Yes | No | No | | |
| Danna Paola, Felukah, and Tamtam | "A Kind of Magic" | 2022 | No | Yes | No | Yes | | |
| Tim Dup | Les Immortelles | 2023 | No | Yes | No | No | | |
| Slogan | "Pizza Manzana" | 2023 | No | Yes | No | Yes | | |
| Cabra | Martínez | 2023 | No | Yes | No | No | Nominated for best Alternative album at the 2023 Latin Grammys Nominated for best Latin Alternative album at the 2023 Grammys | |
| Adore | "Dancing While the World Burns" | 2023 | No | Yes | No | No | | |
| Ingrid Carranza | "Dopamina" | 2023 | No | Yes | No | No | | |
| Adore | "Halo" | 2023 | No | Yes | No | Yes | | |
| Adore | "Falling Back to Earth" | 2023 | No | Yes | No | Yes | | |
| St. Pedro | "Romance" | 2023 | No | Yes | No | No | | |
| Rodrigo Cuevas | Manual de Romería | 2023 | No | Yes | No | No | | |
| Slogan | "Déjà Vieux" | 2023 | No | Yes | No | Yes | | |
| André 3000 | New Blue Sun | 2023 | Add'l | Immersive | No | No | Nominated for best album at the 2025 Grammys Nominated for best Alternative Jazz album at the 2025 Grammys | |
| Laura Cahen | De l'Autre Côté | 2024 | No | Yes | No | No | | |
| Adore | Did I tell U that I miss you | 2024 | No | Yes | No | Yes | | |
| Parlour Magic | Saturn Return | 2024 | Yes | Yes | Yes | No | | |
| Residente | La Letras Ya No Importan | 2024 | No | Yes | No | No | Nominated for Album Of The Year at the 2024 Latin Grammys Won best Musica Urbana album at the 2025 Grammys | |
| Bad Bunny | WellTita | 2025 | No | Yes | No | No | Won Album of the Year at the 2025 Latin Grammys Won Best Urban Music Album at the 2025 Latin Won Album of the Year at the 2026 US Grammys Won Best Urban Music Album at the 2026 US Grammys | |
| Rauw Alejandro | Carita Linda | 2025 | No | Yes | No | No | | |
| Bad Bunny | Alambre Pùa | 2025 | No | Yes | No | No | | |
| ADORE & Bludetiger | High Like Heaven | 2025 | No | Yes | No | Yes | | |
| Parlour Magic | The Embassy | 2026 | Yes | Yes | No | No | | |
| Rauw Alejandro | Dando Vueltas | 2026 | No | Yes | No | No | | |
| Bad Bunny | Spotify Billions Live Album | 2026 | No | Yes | No | Yes | | |
| Sammy Rae And The Friends | Get With My Friend | 2026 | Yes | Yes | Yes | No | | |
