= Kissling =

Kissling is a German language surname. it may refer to:

- Frances Kissling (born 1943), American religious leader
- George Kissling (1805–1865), New Zealand religious leader
- Grace E. Kissling, American biostatistician
- Herbert Kissling (1868–1929), New Zealand cricketer and insurance executive
- Jorge Kissling (1940–1968), Argentine motorcycle racer
- Margaret Kissling (1808–1891), New Zealand educator
- Richard Kissling (1848–1919), Swiss sculptor
- Walter Kissling (1931–2002), Costa Rican businessman
- Werner Kissling (1895–1988), German ethnologist

== Other uses ==
- 4409 Kissling, an asteroid
- Kissling Farm, Pennsylvania

== See also ==
- Kisling
