= Kiesling =

Kiesling is a surname, and may refer to:

- John Brady Kiesling (born 1957), American diplomat
- Lydia Kiesling, American author and literary critic
- Michael Kiesling (born 1957), German board game designer
- Scott Kiesling (born 1967), American linguist
- Walt Kiesling (1903–1962), American football player and coach

== See also ==
- Kießling
