= Mai Leisz =

Estonian bass player and composer (born 1988)

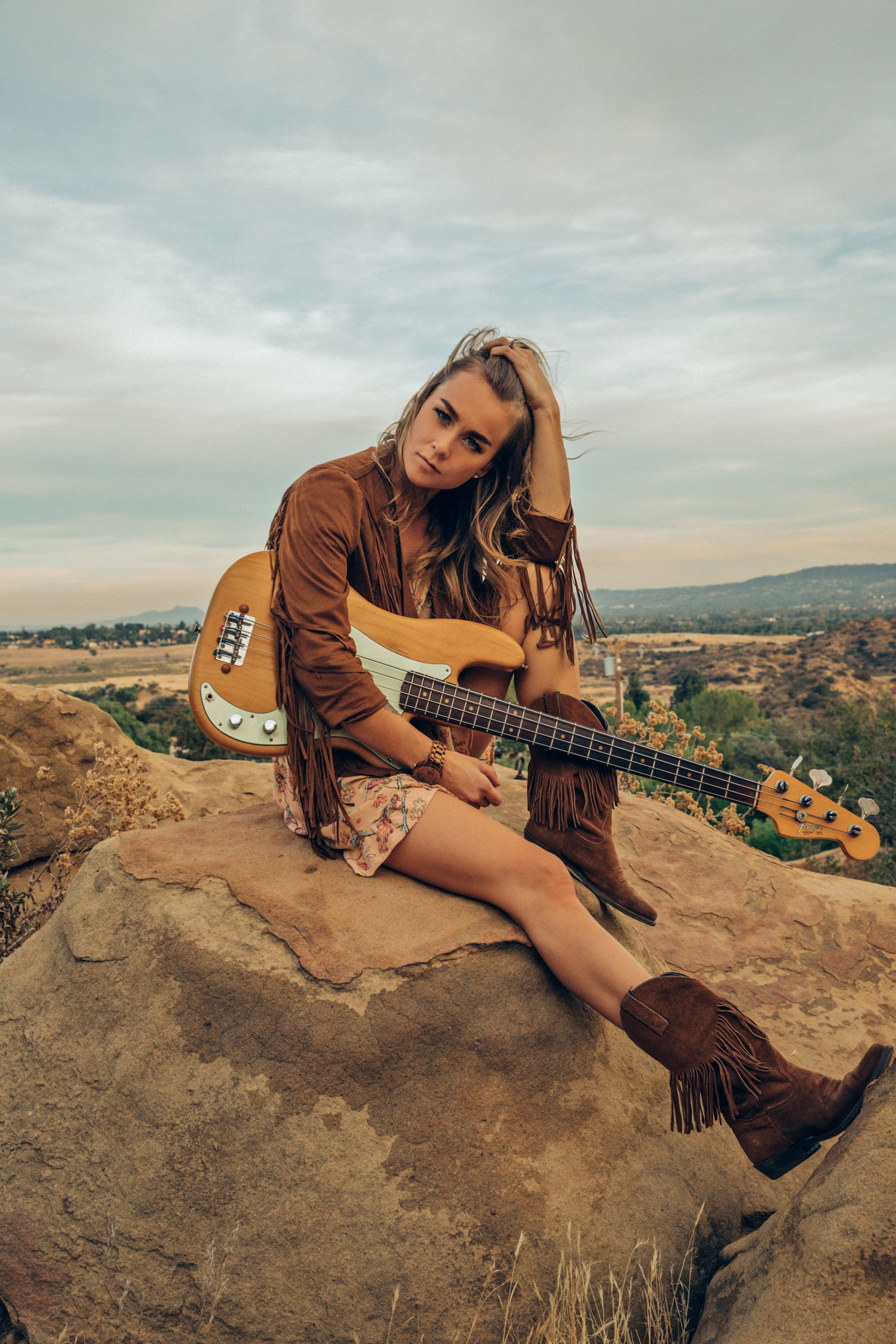

Background information
- Also known as: Mai Agan
- Born: Mai Jõgi; May 5, 1988 (age 38); Kuressaare, then part of Estonian SSR, Soviet Union
- Origin: as Mai Agan
- Genres: jazz, jazz-fusion, pop, rock, folk-rock
- Instruments: electric bass, fretless bass
- Years active: 2004–present
- Website: maileisz.com

Mai Leisz (née Mai Jõgi; born 5 May 1988 in Kuressaare) is an Estonian bass player and composer.

== Biography ==
Leisz started playing classical violin at a local children's music school when she was 6 years old and piano when she was 8. She graduated 7 years later and switched to electric bass at the age of 16. After graduating high school she moved to Tallinn in 2007. She was honored with the best instrumentalist prize at Uno Naissoo Compositions Contest in 2010.

She has graduated from Georg Ots Tallinn Music school (2010), and Skurups Folkhögskola in Sweden (2011). She received her bachelor's degree (2014) and master's degree in Performance - Jazz at the Royal College of Music, Stockholm (2017).

During her years in Sweden, she was touring Scandinavia with different jazz, pop and rock artists including Linnea Henriksson, Carola Häggkvist, Anders Widmark, Norrbotten Big Band, New Places Orchestra and Ebbot Lundberg. In June 2015 she played at Stockholm Waterfront with Jackson Browne after his band members Greg Leisz and Bob Glaub discovered her busking on the streets of Stockholm with American singer-songwriter Doug Seegers. In 2016 she was honored with the Alice Babs Jazz Award and in 2017 she was nominated for the Jazz Cat Newcomer Award by Swedish radio.

== MaiGroup ==
During her first year studying at Skurups Folkhögskola, she gathered together a jazz-fusion band to play her own music. MaiGroup has released three albums: "Luv" (2013), "You" (2015) and "Metamorphosis" (2019). MaiGroup's latest album features guest artists David Crosby, Greg Leisz, Bill Frisell and Charles Lloyd. First single and fourth track on the album, "Here It's Almost Sunset" feat. David Crosby is a song co-written by Mai Leisz and David Crosby.

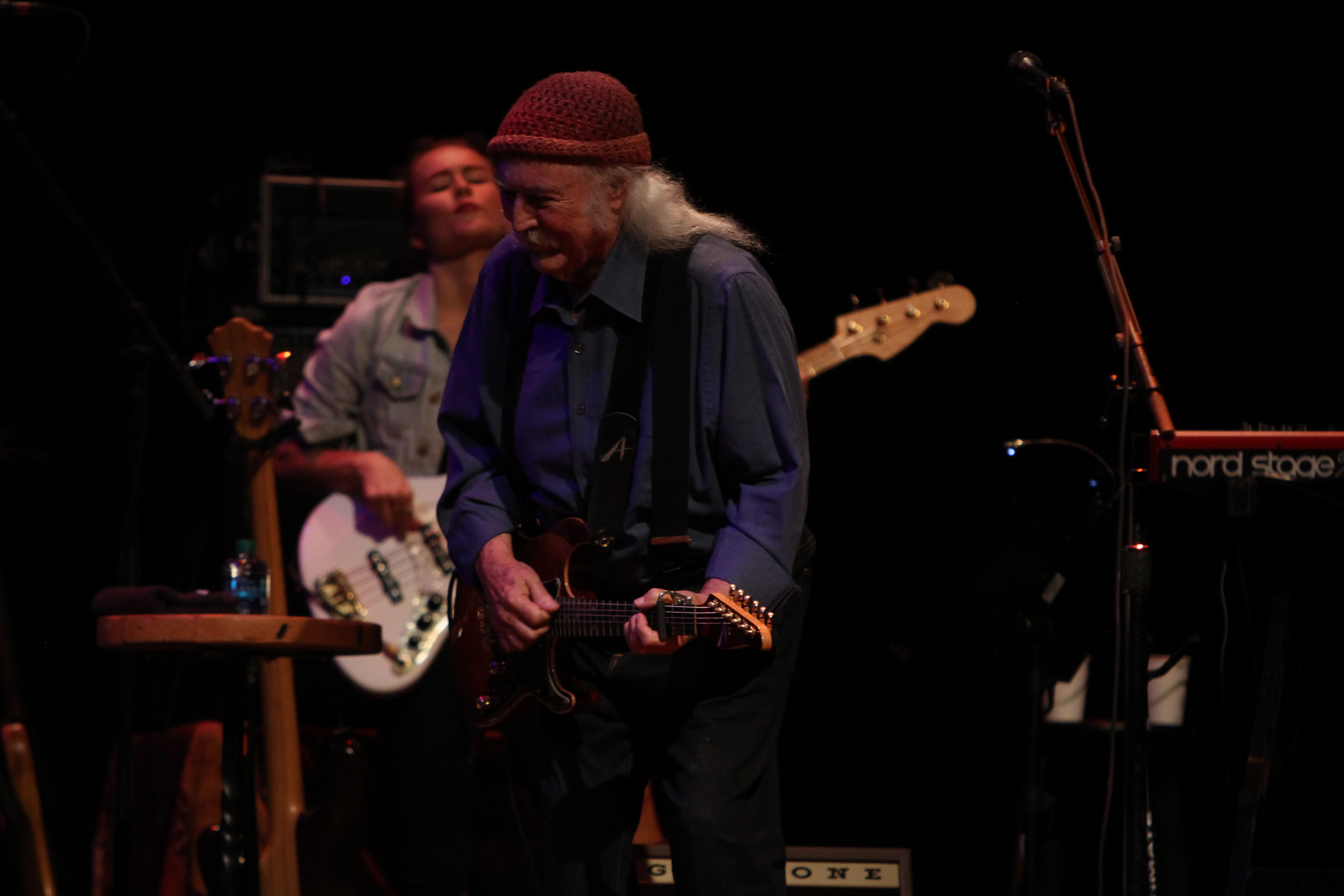
Mai Leisz playing with David Crosby, 2017

== Work with David Crosby ==
After American singer-songwriter and guitarist, two-time member of the Rock and Roll Hall of Fame - David Crosby, of The Byrds and Crosby, Stills, Nash & Young, heard MaiGroup's album "You", Mai was asked to play on Crosby's record "Sky Trails". She recorded fretless bass for the song "Before Tomorrow Falls on Love", written by Crosby and Michael McDonald (musician). In 2016 Mai relocated to Los Angeles and did more recording for Crosby and they also started writing music together. Their song "Here It's Almost Sunset" was released on the Sky Trails album in September 2017.

In January 2017, Crosby announced Leisz to be part of the David Crosby & Friends tour in spring 2017. In August 2017 Crosby announced a fall tour in support of the "Sky Trails" album, featuring James Raymond on keys, Leisz on bass, Steve DiStanislao on drums, Jeff Pevar on guitar and Michelle Willis on keys and vocals. In 2018 Leisz toured Europe as a member of Crosby's backing band, "Sky Trails" band.

In 2019 they toured in the US, and finished the tour performing a song with Jason Isbell & The 400 Unit at Red Rocks Amphitheatre near Morrison, CO. In February 2020, Crosby announced a tour with the "Sky Trails" band, including dates with Jason Isbell & The 400 Unit. The tour was cancelled due to COVID-19 pandemic.

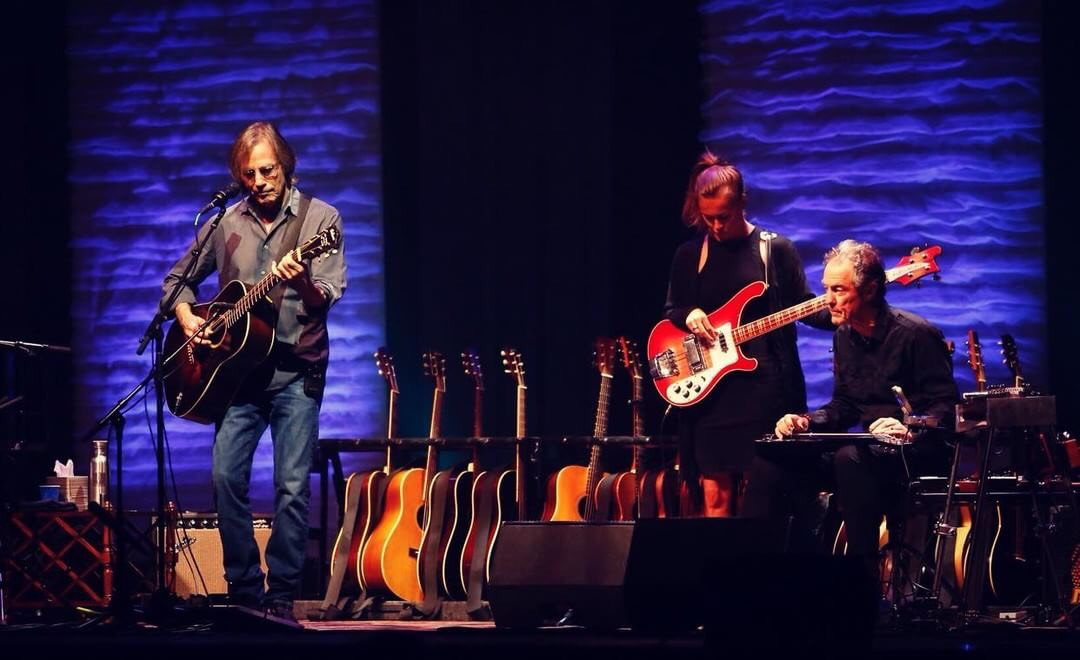
Playing with Jackson Browne and Greg Leisz in 2018

== Other collaborations ==
In 2023, Leisz toured with Jackson Browne as a member of his backing band.

She has also worked with Michael McDonald (musician), Glen Phillips, Bill Frisell, Gary Novak, Michael Landau, Bill Frisell, and performed with Jeff Bridges, Kenny Loggins, David Foster, Shawn Colvin, Jim Keltner, Joan Baez, Rick Allen, Ebbot Lundberg, Brady Blade, Seal, Tõnis Mägi, Riho Sibul, and others.

== Awards ==
She has won grand prix at Alo Mattiisen Music Days (2004), Surpriser award at Tartu Jazz (2007), Best instrumentalist prize at Uno Naissoo Compositions Contest (2010) and Alice Babs Jazz Award (2016), nomination for Jazz Cat Newcomer Award by Swedish Radio 2016. In 2024 she was nominated for a Grammy in the Best Engineered Album, Non-Classical category for Deeper Well by Kacey Musgraves.

== Personal life ==
In April 2018, Mai married American multi-instrumentalist Greg Leisz and took his name in her personal and professional life.
