= Kießling =

Kießling (German pronunciation: [ˈkiːslɪŋ]) is a German topographic surname, which originally meant a resident of an area of gravelly land, from the Middle High German kiselinc ("gravel"). An alternative meaning is as a locational surname for a person from one of the places called Kießling in Germany. Spelling variants include Kiessling and Kiesling. The name may refer to:

- Adolf Kiessling (1837–1893), German classical philologist
- Ann Kiessling (born 1942), American reproductive biologist
- Ellen Kiessling (born 1968), German athlete
- Fabian Kiessling (born 1972), German radiologist and academic
- Georg Kießling (1903–1964), German footballer
- Günter Kießling (1925–2009), German general
- Heinz Kiessling (1926–2003), German musician
- Karl Johann Kiessling (1839–1905), German physicist, mathematician and botanist
- Laura L. Kiessling (born 1960), American chemist
- Michael Kießling (born 1973), German politician
- Olaf Kießling (born 1967), German politician
- Rebecca Kiessling (born 1969), American attorney and activist
- Roland Kiessling (born 1962), German linguist
- Stefan Kießling (born 1984), German footballer
- Udo Kiessling (born 1955), German ice hockey player

== See also ==
- Kiesling
- Kisling
- Kissling
