= Albert Kostin =

American painter

Albert Kostin (1892–1984) was an American painter, born in Odessa (then the Russian Empire, now Ukraine). He started his career around 1912 in Paris, where he specialized in cubism. Later, in the US, he became a respected member of the New York School of abstract-expressionism. Albert Kostin was directly influenced by Pablo Picasso and worked with Jackson Pollock.

== Early life ==
Albert Kostin was born in 1892 in Odessa (the Russian Empire) where he attended the School of Arts. When he was in his twenties, he did what so many other young Russian artists had done before him: move to Paris, the city where modern art was exploding.

== Paris ==
In Paris, Kostin settled near art-centre La Ruche and came into contact with the artistic circle of Montparnasse. This group of artists focussed on modern art movements such as luminism, expressionism, fauvism, futurism and -especially- cubism. It is said he worked in Paris in the studio of Georges Braque and was directly influenced by Pablo Picasso. He worked in the centre of the School of Paris for about six years and made a series of cubistic compositions. In 1918, shortly after World War I ended, Kostin emigrated to the USA.

== United States ==
In the United States, he worked as an independent artist. He married Pauline (1896-?) and became the father of two sons: Abraham (1921-?) and Jesse (1925–2008). Gradually his fame as an artist grew, as he participated in international group expositions with Friez, Kisling, Derain, Jacobi, Picasso, Braque, De Vlaminck, Utrillo and Dufy. His art developed to a new form of abstraction, noted and appreciated both by art critics as well as galleries. At the end of the 1940s, he was offered several solo-exhibitions. In the second half of the 20th century, although he was still active as a painter, he was no longer interested in exhibiting his paintings. He gave away most of his work. He moved to Los Angeles, where he died in 1984.

== Work ==
During his stay in Paris between 1912 and 1918, Kostin made a series of table-compositions, influenced by Pablo Picasso, George Braque and the group of Montparnasse painters (Le Fauconnier, Leger and Metzinger). These table compositions are characterized by a new geometry, vivid and transparent colors and spatial effects. In the 1930s, he worked in the US with Georgia O'Keeffe, Milton Avery and Stuart Davis, painting a series of luminist landscapes. In the 1940s, when his paintings were shown in major New York Galleries, his work developed to abstract color compositions (“More or less influenced by Graham Vivian Sutherland” The New Yorker, May 1949) and later to a subtile form of action-painting. By then, he was influenced by and worked with Jackson Pollock.

== Exhibitions and collections ==
From 1940 to 1941, his paintings were shown in New York in The Gallery of Modern Art and the Contemporary Arts Gallery

In 1949, Kostin had solo exhibitions in both the J.B. Neuman Gallery and the Contemporary Arts Gallery. Reviews were published in the New York Times, Art Digest and Art News (Roy Miller: “Albert Kostin makes a substantial contribution to the abstract-expressionism of the New York School...”

Later, at the end of the century, his paintings were presented in solo exhibitions in Amsterdam (Netherlands, 1995) and Marbella (Spain, 2004)

Most of the paintings of Albert Kostin are part of private collections in Europe and the USA

=== Public collections ===
- New York – Metropolitan Museum of Art
