= Here If You Listen =

Studio album by David Crosby, Michael League, Becca Stevens, and Michelle Willis
- Released: October 26, 2018
- Recorded: March–July 2018
- Studios: Atlantic Sound Studios (Brooklyn, New York); Flux Studios (New York City)
- Genres: Pop rock; folk; jazz
- Length: 45:08
- Label: BMG Music
- Producers: Michael League; David Crosby; Becca Stevens; Michelle Willis; Fab Dupont

David Crosby chronology
Sky Trails (2017)	Here If You Listen (2018)	For Free (2021)

Professional ratings
Aggregate scores
Source	Rating
Metacritic	83/100
Review scores
Source	Rating
AllMusic	4/5 stars
The Arts Desk	4/5 stars
Classic Rock	3.5/5 stars
God Is in the TV	8/10
The Guardian	4/5 stars
Mojo	4/5 stars
Q	4/5 stars
Uncut	8/10

Here If You Listen is an album by David Crosby and his collaborators Michael League, Becca Stevens, and Michelle Willis, who performed on tour together backing Crosby as The Lighthouse Band, and was released on October 26, 2018, by BMG Music.

== Content ==
The Lighthouse Band originated on Crosby's Lighthouse album. Producer Michael League along with Becca Stevens and Michelle Willis provided backing vocals on the Crosby-Stevens song "By the Light of Common Day". On this album, the band is very different. AllMusic reviewer Stephen Thomas Erlewine wrote, "Chalk that up to the Lighthouse Band interacting like a band here, collaborating on the writing and trading off lead vocals as they glide into lush, shimmering harmonies." Seven of the eleven tracks were written by all four members, with another penned by the quartet plus Snarky Puppy keyboard player Bill Laurance. One tune is by Stevens and Jane Tyson Clement, and another is by Willis. Only Joni Mitchell's "Woodstock" is not a Lighthouse Band composition.

== Track listing ==
No.	Title	Lyrics	Music	Length
1.	"Glory"	Willis, Crosby, Stevens, League	David Crosby, Michelle Willis, Becca Stevens, Michael League	5:20
2.	"Vagrants of Venice"	Stevens, Crosby, League, Willis	Stevens	4:06
3.	"1974"	Stevens, Crosby, Willis, League	Crosby, Stevens	3:00
4.	"Your Own Ride"	Crosby, League	Bill Laurance, League, Willis, Stevens	3:34
5.	"Buddha on a Hill"	League, Crosby, Stevens, Willis	Crosby, League, Stevens, Willis	4:07
6.	"I Am No Artist"	Jane Tyson Clement	Stevens	4:37
7.	"1967"	Willis, League, Stevens	Crosby, Willis, League, Stevens	3:19
8.	"Balanced on a Pin"	Crosby	Crosby, Stevens, Willis, League	4:30
9.	"Other Half Rule"	League, Stevens, Willis, Crosby	League, Stevens, Willis	4:34
10.	"Janet"	Willis	Willis	3:27
11.	"Woodstock"	Mitchell	Joni Mitchell	4:34

== Personnel ==
- David Crosby – vocals, acoustic guitar (1, 3, 5, 7, 8, 11)
- Michael League – vocals, acoustic guitar (1, 3–5, 9), Minimoog bass (1, 2, 5, 9), electric bass (1–3, 5, 7, 8, 10, 11), 12-string acoustic guitar (3, 7), ARP Omni (4, 6), electric guitar (5), fretless baritone electric guitar (5), baritone acoustic guitar (11)
- Becca Stevens – vocals, Hammertone electric guitar (1, 5, 8, 9), 7-string electric guitar (2), ukulele (4), acoustic guitar (6, 9, 11), electric guitar (6), charango (10)
- Michelle Willis – vocals, Fender Rhodes (1–3, 5, 6, 8, 9), ARP Omni (2, 6), pump organ (2, 4, 9), organ (5, 10), Rhodes bass (5, 9), Wurlitzer electric piano (10), acoustic piano (11)
- Bill Laurance – acoustic piano (4)

=== Production ===
- Michael League – producer
- David Crosby – co-producer, liner notes
- Becca Stevens – co-producer
- Michelle Willis – co-producer
- Fab Dupont – co-producer, engineer, mixing
- Josh Welshman – additional engineer
- Tom Beuchel – assistant engineer
- John Muller – assistant engineer
- Joey Wunsch – assistant engineer
- Greg Calbi – mastering
- Emilia Canas Mendes – artwork
- Gili Dailes – photography
- Stella K. – photography
- Jeffrey Parrish – photography
- Mike Chadwick – management
- Mastered at Sterling Sound (New York, NY).
