= House of Waters =

American international fusion band

- Origin: Brooklyn, New York City, New York, U.S.
- Genres: International; fusion; progressive rock; jazz; Afrobeat; pan-Asian; psychedelic
- Years active: c. 2008–present
- Label: GroundUP Music
- Members: Max ZT; Moto Fukushima; Franco Pinna; Juan Chiavassa; Richie Barshay
- Past members: Luke Notary; Ignacio Rivas Bixio
- Website: houseofwaters.com

House of Waters is an American international fusion band. Created c. 2008, it is composed of hammered dulcimer player Max ZT, six-stringed bassist Moto Fukushima, and have worked with a variety of different drummers and percussionists over the years.

Its style draws from its members' musical backgrounds, incorporating elements of world music, jazz, progressive rock, classical, Senegalese music, and South American music. It has received critical praise for its unique instrumentation, melodic chemistry, and relaxed and fluid sound.

== History ==
House of Waters was created c. 2008 as a five-piece band, which sometime after reduced to a trio. Its name evokes a sense of fluidity, described by Paste as "the stability and consistency of a well-built home with the clarity and fluidity of water."

The band released its first album in 2009. It joined the label GroundUP Music, begun by Michael League of Snarky Puppy, in 2016. It began touring internationally in 2017. For their 2023 release - On Becoming - the band was nominated for Best Contemporary Instrumental Album at the 66th annual Grammy Awards. The album features Antonio Sanchez (drums), Mike Stern (guitar), and Priya Darshini (vocals).

== Musical style ==
The band's style incorporates elements of world music, jazz, progressive rock, classical, Senegalese music, and South American music.

It incorporates elements from its members' backgrounds. Zbiral-Teller has a background in traditional Irish music, and was trained under Sankoum, Fode, and Boubacar Cissoko in Senegal, and under Shivkumar Sharma in India. Fukushima was trained in jazz, classical, and South American music.

Music critics have noted the band's unique instrumentation, repurposing the hammered dulcimer, traditionally known as an Appalachian folk music instrument. They have also noted the band's genre fusion, melodic cooperation and chemistry, and relaxed, fluid style. "There is an open air to the sound design that flirts with embellishments that are vibrantly full of life. It feels beautifully unobtrusive without being rendered disengaging," wrote Tyler Caldas in a review for Everything Is Noise. Dan Scheiman of OnStage Reviews noted that "the real plunge into the rock, dance, and metal genres happens when they let loose live". The New York Music Daily wrote that "there is no other group in the world who sound remotely like them;" Mike Collins in Jazzwise called that description "rather over-heated" while still praising the group.

== Band members ==
- Max Zbiral-Teller – hammered dulcimer
- Moto Fukushima – six-stringed bassist
- Franco Pinna - drums (2024-present)
- Juan Chiavassa - drums (2021–present)
- Richie Barshay - drums (2021–present)
- Ignacio Rivas Bixio – percussion (2016–2021)
- Luke Notary – percussion (founding–2016)

== Discography ==
- Elsewhere (2009)
- Peace the Coats (2009)
- Revolution (2016)
- House of Waters (2016)
- Rising (2019)
- Le Voyage Dans La Lune (2022)
- Ménilmontant (2022)
- Ballet Mécanique (2022)
- Where I Wander (2022)
- On Becoming (2023)
- On Becoming: The Improv Sessions (2024)

The band composed the score for the ESPN program E:60.
