= Ernesto Cruz =

Nicaraguan banker, lawyer, and academic

- Born: Ernesto Cruz; August 3, 1931 (age 94); León, Nicaragua
- Education: JD and PhD
- Alma mater: Harvard University; University of Miami School of Law
- Occupations: Educator and banker
- Known for: Founding Rector of INCAE

Ernesto Cruz (born August 3, 1931) is a Nicaraguan banker, lawyer, and academic. Cruz was the founding Rector of INCAE, a position he held until 1980.

== Early life and education ==
Ernesto Cruz was born in León, Nicaragua, in 1931. After spending his youth in Managua, Cruz moved to Silver Spring, Maryland, USA, for boarding school. In 1956 Cruz earned his law degree from the National University of Nicaragua. After practicing law for several years, he went to Harvard University, where he earned a PhD in Political Economy and Government in 1968. After moving back to Nicaragua, he returned to the US in 1980, moving to Miami where he would eventually earn a JD from the University of Miami School of Law. He then worked in the banking industry for companies including BAC Financial Network.

== INCAE ==
Cruz became the founding Rector of INCAE in 1968, and remained in that position until 1980. During his time at the head of the institution, he worked with Harvard and other US schools to provide advanced degrees in business management and executive education programs to Central and South Americans. He also created scholarship on subjects such as the proper role of government. An official portrait of him was unveiled at the university in 2013.

== Writing ==
In 2017 Cruz published a history on INCAE’s inception and early years entitled INCAE, Los Años Formativos. In 2018 Cruz released his first literary book Cuentos Verídicos, which contains twenty-four stories from his career. For each he has taken literary liberties and changed the names of those involved.
