= Sky Trails =

Studio album by David Crosby
- Released: September 29, 2017
- Recorded: February–June 2017
- Studios: The Bamboom Room (Altadena, CA); Groove Masters (Santa Monica, CA); Rumor Mill Recording (Santa Ynez, CA); Sunset Sound (Hollywood, CA); Esplenade Studios (New Orleans, LA); Amaja Studio and Tuhalaane Studio (Estonia)
- Genre: Jazz rock
- Length: 50:29
- Label: BMG
- Producer: James Raymond

David Crosby chronology
Lighthouse (2016)	Sky Trails (2017)	Here If You Listen (2018)

Professional ratings
Aggregate scores
Source	Rating
Metacritic	76/100
Review scores
Source	Rating
AllMusic	4/5 stars
American Songwriter	3.5/5 stars
The Arts Desk	4/5 stars
Classic Rock	4/5 stars
Mojo	4/5 stars
PopMatters	7/10
Q	4/5 stars
Record Collector	4/5 stars
Rolling Stone	3/5 stars
Uncut	7/10

Sky Trails is David Crosby's sixth solo album, released on September 29, 2017, by BMG Music. It is Crosby's third album in less than four years, whereas his first three solo albums appeared over a span of 22 years. Musicians on the album derive in part from Crosby's various 21st Century collaborations. Producer James Raymond and Jeff Pevar were Crosby's bandmates in CPR; Andrew Ford and Steve DiStanislao were respectively that band's touring bassist and drummer. Michael League of Snarky Puppy and Becca Stevens had appeared on Crosby's previous album, and Dean Parks had played on the 2004 album Crosby did with long-time partner Graham Nash.

== Track listing ==
No.	Title	Writer(s)	Length
1.	"She's Got to Be Somewhere"	James Raymond	4:47
2.	"Sky Trails"	David Crosby, Becca Stevens	4:51
3.	"Sell Me a Diamond"	David Crosby, James Raymond	5:29
4.	"Before Tomorrow Falls on Love"	David Crosby, Michael McDonald	3:52
5.	"Here It's Almost Sunset"	David Crosby, Mai Agan	3:54
6.	"Capitol"	David Crosby, James Raymond	6:58
7.	"Amelia"	Joni Mitchell	5:39
8.	"Somebody Home"	David Crosby	4:39
9.	"Curved Air"	David Crosby, James Raymond	4:45
10.	"Home Free"	David Crosby, James Raymond	5:41
Total length:			50:29

== Personnel ==
- David Crosby — vocals, acoustic guitar (10)
- James Raymond – acoustic piano (1, 3, 4, 6, 7, 10), electric piano (1, 3, 5, 6), synthesizers (1–5, 7, 10), synth bass (1, 3, 7), horn arrangements (1), drum programming (3, 6), vocoder (5, 9), all other instruments (9), backing vocals (9), acoustic guitar (10), percussion (10)
- Dean Parks – electric guitar (1, 6)
- Becca Stevens – acoustic guitars (2), vocals (2)
- Jeff Pevar – electric guitar (3)
- Greg Leisz – pedal steel guitar (3, 6, 7)
- Steve Postell – acoustic guitar (6)
- Mai Agan – bass guitar (2, 4, 5, 10), backing vocals (5)
- Andrew Ford – bass guitar (6)
- Steve DiStanislao – drums (1, 3, 5, 6)
- Gary Novak – drums (9)
- Steve Tavaglione – tenor saxophone (1), soprano saxophone (2, 5, 6), EWI (5, 6), alto flute (9)
- Walt Fowler – flugelhorn (1)
- Jacob Collier – backing vocals (1)

Instruments on "Somebody Home"

- Snarky Puppy:
- Bill Laurance – acoustic piano
- Justin Stanton – electric piano
- Shaun Martin – synthesizers
- Cory Henry – organ
- Bob Lanzetti – guitar
- Mark Lettieri – guitar
- Chris McQueen – guitar
- Michael League – bass
- Robert "Sput" Searight – drums
- Nate Werth – percussion
- Jeff Coffin – alto saxophone, flute
- Chris Bullock – tenor saxophone
- Jay Jennings – flugelhorn
- Mike "Maz" Maher – flugelhorn

== Production ==
- James Raymond – producer, recording (1–7, 9, 10)
- Dan Garcia – recording (1–7, 9, 10), mixing
- Andre Maaker – bass recording (4)
- Eric Hartman – recording (8)
- Meelis Tinno – bass recording (10)
- Joel Jacks – assistant engineer
- Bill Lang – assistant engineer
- Rich Tosi – assistant engineer
- Ed Wong – assistant engineer
- Nate Haze – mix assistant
- Bernie Grundman – mastering
- Emilia Canas Mendes – artwork
- Jeffrey Parrish – photography
- Bamboo Studios – photography
- Mike Chadwick – management

Studios

- Recorded at The Bamboom Room (Altadena, CA); Groove Masters (Santa Monica, CA); Rumor Mill Recording (Santa Ynez, CA); Sunset Sound (Hollywood, CA); Esplenade Studios (New Orleans, LA); Amaja Studio and Tuhalaane Studio (Estonia).
- Mixed at Sunset Sound
- Mastered at Bernie Grundman Mastering (Hollywood, CA).
