= For Free (disambiguation) =

"For Free" is a song by DJ Khaled featuring Drake

For Free may also refer to:

- "For Free? (Interlude)", a song by Kendrick Lamar
- For Free (album), by David Crosby
- "For Free", a song from Ladies of the Canyon (album) by Joni Mitchell
- Free of charge
