= For Free (album) =

Studio album by David Crosby
- Released: July 23, 2021
- Recorded: August–December 2020
- Studios: The Bamboom Room (Altadena, California); Hz Werks (Van Nuys, California); Joel Jacks' Studio (Santa Ynez, California); Groove Masters (Santa Monica, California); Stubbs Recording (Spring Hill, Tennessee); Tomorrow's Sound Today (Memphis, Tennessee)
- Genre: Rock
- Length: 37:29
- Labels: Three Blind Mice; BMG
- Producer: James Raymond

David Crosby chronology
Here If You Listen (2018)	For Free (2021)	Live at the Capitol Theater (2022)

For Free is the eighth and final studio album by American singer-songwriter David Crosby, released on July 23, 2021, by Three Blind Mice and BMG, a month prior to his 80th birthday. It marks his final studio recording released during his lifetime before his death in January 2023.

== Background ==
For Free represents the culmination of Crosby's late-career creative revival that began in the mid-2010s. The album was produced by keyboardist James Raymond, Crosby's son, who served as his key musical collaborator since the late 1990s in the group CPR. The recording took place between August and December 2020 across multiple studios, adapting to remote production constraints during the COVID-19 pandemic.

The title track is a cover of a 1970 song written by Crosby's long-time friend Joni Mitchell for her album Ladies of the Canyon, recorded as a duet with Grammy Award-winning singer-songwriter Sarah Jarosz.

The album incorporates notable guest appearances. The opening track "River Rise" features guest vocals by Michael McDonald. "Rodriguez for a Night" features lyrics written specifically for Crosby by Steely Dan's Donald Fagen. The album cover art features a portrait painting of Crosby created by fellow folk singer and friend Joan Baez.

== Critical reception ==
Professional ratings
Aggregate scores
Source	Rating
Metacritic	84/100
Review scores
Source	Rating
AllMusic	4/5 stars
American Songwriter	4/5 stars
The Arts Desk	4/5 stars
Classic Rock	4/5 stars
Mojo	4/5 stars
NME	5/5 stars
PopMatters	8/10
Record Collector	4/5 stars
Rolling Stone	3.5/5 stars
Uncut	4/5 stars

For Free received universal acclaim from music critics. At Metacritic, which assigns a normalized rating out of 100 to reviews from mainstream publications, the album received an average score of 84 based on six reviews. Reviewers praised Crosby's vocal strength, contemplative lyrics dealing with aging and mortality, and the album's sophisticated West Coast rock and jazz-influenced production.

== Track listing ==
For Free track listing
No.	Title	Writer(s)	Length
1.	"River Rise" (featuring Michael McDonald)	David Crosby, James Raymond, Michael McDonald	3:33
2.	"I Think I"	Crosby, Raymond, Steve Postell	4:52
3.	"The Other Side of Midnight"	Raymond	3:14
4.	"Rodriguez for a Night"	Crosby, Donald Fagen, Raymond	3:17
5.	"Secret Dancer"	Crosby, Raymond	3:14
6.	"Ships in the Night"	Crosby	3:25
7.	"For Free" (featuring Sarah Jarosz)	Joni Mitchell	3:43
8.	"Boxes"	Raymond	4:14
9.	"Shot at Me"	Crosby, Dean Parks	3:13
10.	"I Won't Stay for Long"	Raymond	4:29
Total length:			37:29

== Personnel ==
- David Crosby – vocals
- James Raymond – acoustic piano (1–5, 7, 8, 10), synthesizers (1–6, 8–10), synth guitar solo (1, 4), synth bass (1–3, 6, 9, 10), synth acoustic guitar (3, 8), drum programming (3), Fender Rhodes (4, 9), percussion (4), horn arrangements (4), Wurlitzer electric piano (6), backing vocals (8)
- Shawn Tubbs – guitars (1), acoustic guitar (6, 8), electric guitar (6, 8)
- Steve Postell – acoustic guitar (2), backing vocals (2), guitars (5)
- Greg Leisz – pedal steel guitar (2)
- Dean Parks – guitars (4), acoustic guitar (9), electric guitar (9)
- Andrew Ford – bass guitar (4)
- Elijah Thomson – bass guitar (8)
- Gary Novak – drums (1, 4–6, 9)
- Steve DiStanislao – drums (2, 10)
- Abe Laboriel Jr. – drums (8)
- Steve Tavaglione – tenor saxophone (4), EWI (10)
- Walt Fowler – trumpet (4), flugelhorn (4)
- Michael McDonald – backing vocals (1)
- Gracie Raymond – backing vocals (3)
- Becca Stevens – backing vocals (3)
- Michelle Willis – backing vocals (3, 6, 8)
- Sarah Jarosz – vocals (7)
- Brian Wilson – count-in vocal (10)

== Production ==
- James Raymond – producer, arrangements, recording, mixing
- Dan Garcia – recording, mixing
- David Crosby – mixing
- Nate Hassely – assistant engineer
- Joel Jacks – assistant engineer
- Jason Mariani – assistant engineer
- Kaushlesh "Garry" Purohit – assistant engineer
- Shawn Tubbs – guitar recording (1, 6, 8)
- Dean Parks – guitar recording (4, 9)
- Bernie Grundman – mastering
- Louise Hendy – artwork design
- Joan Baez – sleeve artwork, original painting
- Mike Chadwick – management

Studios

- Recorded at The Bamboom Room (Altadena, California); Hz Werks (Van Nuys, California); Joel Jacks' Studio (Santa Ynez, California); Groove Masters (Santa Monica, California); Stubbs Recording (Spring Hill, Tennessee); Tomorrow's Sound Today (Memphis, Tennessee).
- Mixed at The Bamboom Room; Sunset Sound (Hollywood, California); Carbonite Sound (Ojai, California).
- Mastered at Bernie Grundman Mastering (Hollywood, California).

== Charts ==
Chart performance for For Free
Chart (2021)	Peak position
Austrian Albums (Ö3 Austria)	73
Belgian Albums (Ultratop Flanders)	35
Belgian Albums (Ultratop Wallonia)	67
Dutch Albums (Album Top 100)	48
German Albums (Offizielle Top 100)	23
Italian Albums (FIMI)	84
Scottish Albums (Official Charts)	10
Swiss Albums (Schweizer Hitparade)	14
UK Albums (Official Charts)	53
UK Independent Albums (Official Charts)	2
