= Becca Stevens =

American jazz, pop, and folk singer

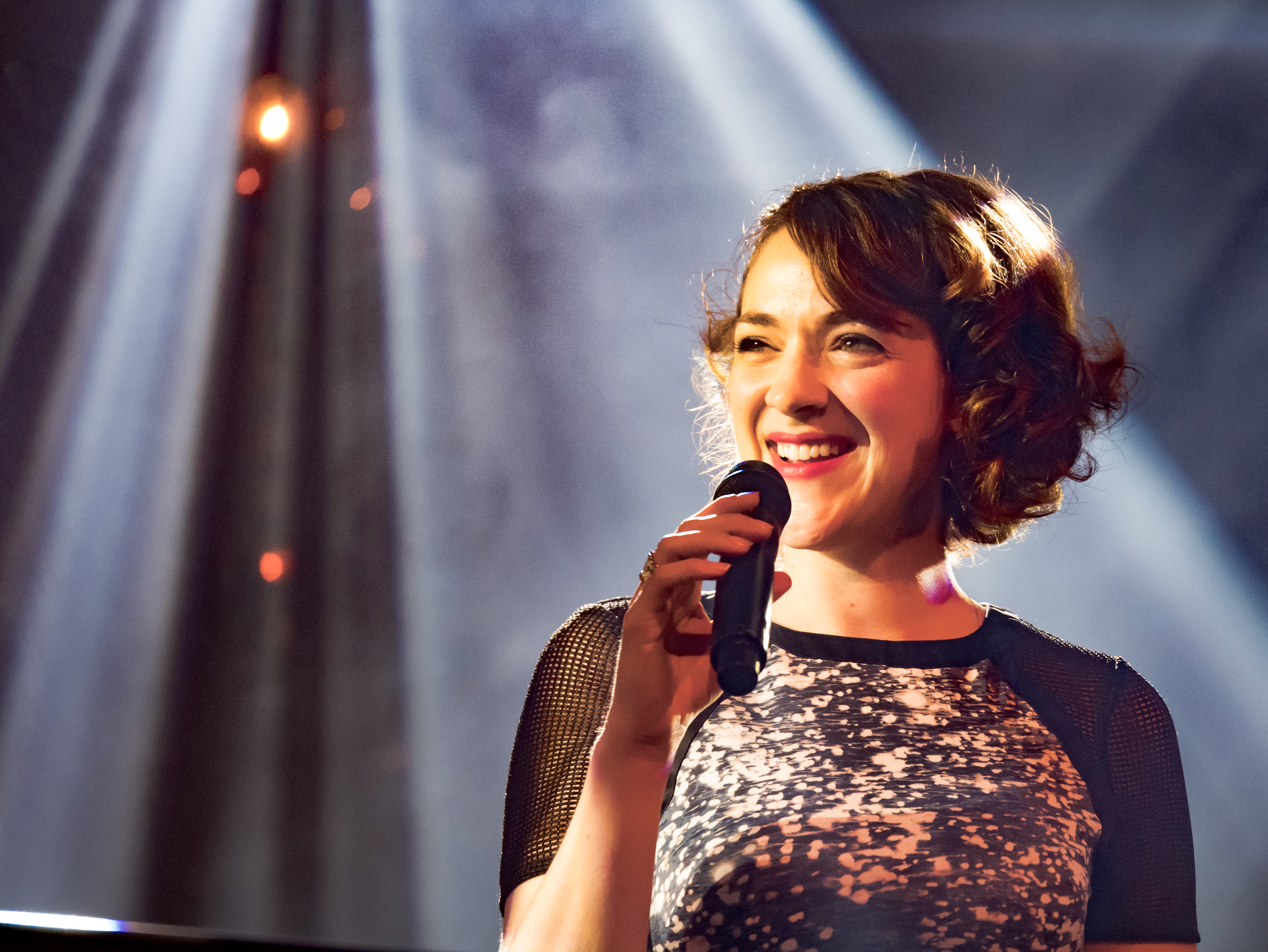
- Moers Festival, 2016

Background information
- Born: June 14, 1984 (age 42); Winston-Salem, North Carolina, U.S.
- Genres: Jazz; folk; chamber pop; indie rock
- Occupations: Musician; composer; singer-songwriter
- Instruments: Vocals; guitar; ukulele; charango
- Labels: Sunnyside; GroundUp; Universal
- Website: beccastevens.com

Becca Stevens (born June 14, 1984) is an American singer, songwriter, and guitarist who draws upon elements of jazz, chamber pop, indie rock, and folk.

== Early life and education ==
Stevens was born in Winston-Salem, North Carolina, the youngest of three children of William Stevens, a composer of religious choral music, and Carolyn Dorff, a singer. As a child Stevens performed and toured in her family's children's music group, the Tune Mammals. When she was ten years old she and her mother starred in a year-long national tour of the musical The Secret Garden. After her parents' separation she attended the Peddie School in New Jersey for 9th and 10th grades. She finished high school at the North Carolina School of the Arts, where she studied classical guitar; at this time she also sang in her brother's jazz rock band, Gomachi. After high school she spent a year with Gomachi before attending college at The New School for Jazz and Contemporary Music in New York City, where she received a degree in vocal jazz and composition.

== Career ==
Stevens has released five albums as a leader: Tea Bye Sea (2008), Weightless (2011), Perfect Animal (2015), Regina (2017), and Wonderbloom (2020). She has worked with Jacob Collier, Laura Mvula, Billy Childs, David Crosby, Taylor Eigsti, Timo Andres, Brad Mehldau, Travis Sullivan's Bjorkestra, Michael McDonald, and Snarky Puppy. She was a member of the band Tillery with Gretchen Parlato and Rebecca Martin.

One track on David Crosby's Michael League-produced Lighthouse album featured Crosby, League, Stevens, and Michelle Willis (with Bill Laurance on piano) performing "By the Light of Common Day", a song written by Stevens and Crosby. The quartet became The Lighthouse Band that performed on Crosby's album Here If You Listen.

Jazz vocalist Kurt Elling listed her as one of his five favorite jazz vocalists and music critic Ted Gioia listed her albums Weightless (2011) and Perfect Animal (2015) among the one hundred best albums of the corresponding years.

Stevens's album Regina (2017) was produced by Michael League and Troy Miller and received a five-star review from Down Beat magazine, which called it "the most spectacular of albums", while BBC Radio 2 praised the album saying, "Lyrically, the album is astounding".

She has twice been nominated for the Grammy Award for Best Arrangement, Instrumental and Vocals, in 2021 for "Slow Burn" on Wonderbloom and in 2022 for "2 + 2 = 5" on Becca Stevens | Attacca Quartet with her co-arranger and husband, the violist Nathan Schram.

== Personal life ==
Stevens married Nathan Schram, the violist of the Attacca Quartet, in 2017. Stevens and Schram live in Brooklyn, New York City. They have two daughters.

== Discography ==
=== As leader/co-leader ===
- Tea Bye Sea (self-released, 2008) – remastered version (Core Port, 2015)
- Weightless (Sunnyside, 2011)
- Perfect Animal (Core Port/Universal, 2014)
- Regina (GroundUP, 2017)
- Pallet on Your Floor with Elan Mehler (Newvelle, 2020) – rec. 2019
- Wonderbloom (GroundUP, 2020)
- Becca Stevens & the Secret Trio (GroundUP, 2021)
- Becca Stevens | Attacca Quartet (GroundUP, 2022)
- Maple to Paper (GroundUP, 2024)

=== Collaborations ===
A benefit for "Arts For Life"
With Stevens family and their musical friends in New York and North Carolina

- V.A., My Life Is Bold (Sunnyside, 2012) – compilation

The Jazz Gallery and Habitat for Humanity

- V.A., Home: Gift of Music - Japan Earthquake / Tsunami Relief (Sunnyside, 2012) – compilation, 2 tracks.

Tillery
With Gretchen Parlato and Rebecca Martin

- Tillery (Core Port, 2016)

Mirrors
With Gisela João, Justin Stanton, Louis Cato and Michael League

- Mirrors (GroundUP, 2021)

=== As guest ===
With Jacob Collier

- Djesse Vol. 2 (Hajanga, 2019)
- Djesse Vol. 3 (Hajanga, 2020)

With David Crosby

- Lighthouse (Groove Masters, 2016)
- Sky Trails (BMG, 2017)
- Here If You Listen (BMG, 2018)
- For Free (BMG, 2021) – 1 track

With Taylor Eigsti

- Daylight at Midnight (Concord Jazz, 2010)
- Tree Falls (GSI, 2021)
- Plot Armor (GroundUP, 2024)

With Brad Mehldau

- 2017–18: Finding Gabriel (Nonesuch, 2019)
- 2020–21: Jacob's Ladder (Nonesuch, 2022)

With others

- Ambrose Akinmusire, The Imagined Savior Is Far Easier to Paint (Blue Note, 2014) – recorded in 2013
- Susana Baca, Palabras Urgentes (Real World, 2021)
- Steve Bailey, Carolina (Treehouse, 2020)
- Billy Childs, Map to the Treasure: Reimagining Laura Nyro (Sony Masterworks, 2014)
- Peter Eldridge, Disappearing Day (Sunnyside, 2016)
- Guilhem Flouzat, Portraits (Sunnyside, 2015) – recorded in 2014
- Steve Haines and The Third Floor Orchestra, Steve Haines And The Third Floor Orchestra (Justin Time, 2019) – recorded in 2018
- José James, While You Were Sleeping (Blue Note, 2014)
- Antonio Lizana, Una Realidad Diferente (Warner Music Spain, 2020)
- Kate McGarry + Keith Ganz Ensemble, What To Wear In The Dark (Resilience Music Alliance, 2021)
- New West Guitar Group, Send One Your Love (Summit, 2015)
- Aya Nishina, Flora (Tzadik, 2013)
- Jeremy Pelt, Shock Value: Live at Smoke (Maxjazz, 2007) – live
- Laura Perrudin, Perspectives & Avatars (Volatine, 2021)
- The Sachal Ensemble, Song of Lahore (Universal Classics, 2016) – companion album to the film Song of Lahore (2015)
- Sam Sadigursky, Words Project II (New Amsterdam, 2008)
- Sirintip, Tribus (GroundUP Music, 2018)
- Snarky Puppy, Family Dinner – Volume 2 (GroundUP, 2016) – recorded in 2015
- Esperanza Spalding, Radio Music Society (Heads Up, 2012)
- Dayna Stephens, I'll Take My Chances (Criss Cross, 2013)
- Travis Sullivan's Bjorkestra, Enjoy! (Koch, 2008)
- Chris Tordini, Midnight Sun (Newvelle, 2017) – recorded in 2016
