= Nathan Schram =

American composer and violist

- Born: U.S.
- Genres: Classical music
- Occupations: violist, Composer
- Instrument: Viola

Nathan Schram is an American violist and composer. He has won two Grammy Awards out of 3 nominations. He is a member of the Attacca Quartet.

== Life and career ==
Schram studied viola at the Indiana University Jacobs School of Music and at the Reina Sofía School of Music. As of March 2023, he was a PhD student in Music Composition at Princeton University. He was awarded the Robertson Prize at the Primrose International Viola Competition. He is the founder and artistic director of Musicambia, which develops music education programs in prisons throughout the United States.

Nathan has collaborated with artists such as Björk, Sting, James Blake, Joshua Bell, David Crosby, and others. He is also a violist in the Affiliate Ensemble of Carnegie Hall and a core member of Decoda. His debut solo album Oak & the Ghost was released in 2019 on New Amsterdam Records. In 2020, he was appointed as the Honorary Ambassador to the City of Chuncheon, South Korea.

== Personal life ==
Schram married Becca Stevens, a singer and guitarist, on September 2, 2017. The couple live in Brooklyn, New York City. Together, they have two daughters (born 2022 and 2024).

== Selected discography ==
- Nearsided (2022)
- Tree Falls (2021)
- Mirrors (2021)
- Do You Ever (2020)
- Wonderbloom (2020)
- Secret Place (2019)
- Oak & the Ghost (2019)

== Awards and nominations ==
Year	Result	Award	Category	Work	Ref.
2023	Nominated	Grammy Awards	Best Arrangement, Instrumental and Vocals	"2 + 2 = 5 (Arr. Nathan Schram)"	
2023	Won	Grammy Awards	Best Chamber Music/Small Ensemble Performance	Shaw: Evergreen	
2020	Won	Grammy Awards	Best Chamber Music/Small Ensemble Performance	Shaw: Orange	
