= Travis Sullivan's Björkestra =

US musical group

- Origin: New York City
- Genres: Jazz, experimental, pop
- Years active: 2004–present
- Label: Koch
- Members: Travis Sullivan; Becca Stevens; Sean Nowell; Steve Welsh; Lauren Sevian; Kevin Bryan; Ravi Best; Eli Asher; Brian Pareschi; Alan Ferber; Ryan Keberle; James Hirschfeld; Kevin L. Schmidt; David Cook; Art Hirahara; Yoshi Waki; Ian Cook; Joe Abbatantuono
- Website: www.bjorkestra.com

Travis Sullivan's Björkestra is an 18-piece, genre-bending jazz orchestra from New York City. The band is led by alto saxophonist Travis Sullivan with arrangements by Sullivan, Kevin Schmidt, and Kelly Pratt. The Björkestra performs the music of eclectic musician Björk.

== History ==
Since its debut in September 2004 at the Knitting Factory in New York City, Travis Sullivan's Björkestra has performed around the country. They have been mentioned in The Wall Street Journal, Relix Magazine, and Jazz Times. In 2007 Sullivan conducted his arrangements with the Sicilian Jazz Orchestra to a sold-out crowd at Teatro Golden in Palermo, Sicily.

Members of Travis Sullivan's Björkestra—often referred to as The Björkestra—have performed with Arcade Fire, Dr. Dre, Charlie Hunter, The Spam All Stars, Maria Schneider, and the Saturday Night Live Band. Guests have included saxophonist Donny McCaslin and guitarists Kurt Rosenwinkel and Ben Monder. The ensemble includes vocalist Becca Stevens.

== Members ==
- Travis Sullivan – alto saxophone
- Eli Asher – trumpet
- Ravi Best – trumpet
- Kevin Bryan – trumpet
- Brian Pareschi – trumpet
- Alan Ferber – trombone
- James Hirschfeld – trombone
- Ryan Keberle – trombone
- Kevin L. Schmidt – bass trombone
- Sean Nowell – tenor saxophone
- Steve Welsh – tenor saxophone
- Lauren Sevian – baritone saxophone
- David Cook – piano, keyboard
- Art Hirahara – piano keyboard
- Yoshi Waki – double bass, bass guitar
- Joe Abbatantuono – drums
- Ian Cook – electronic percussion
- Becca Stevens – vocals

== Discography ==
- Enjoy! (Koch, 2008)
- I Go Humble (Zoho, 2013)
