= Lighthouse (David Crosby album) =

Studio album by David Crosby
- Released: October 21, 2016
- Recorded: February 2016
- Studio: Groove Masters (Santa Monica); Harmony (Wolcatt); Flux (New York City)
- Genre: Folk
- Length: 40:30
- Label: GroundUP
- Producer: Michael League; Fab Dupont

David Crosby chronology
Croz (2014)	Lighthouse (2016)	Sky Trails (2017)

Professional ratings
Aggregate scores
Source	Rating
Metacritic	77/100
Review scores
Source	Rating
AllMusic	3.5/5 stars
American Songwriter	3.5/5 stars
The Arts Desk	3/5 stars
Financial Times	3/5 stars
Mojo	4/5 stars
Pitchfork	6.5/10
Q	4/5 stars
Record Collector	4/5 stars
Rolling Stone	3.5/5 stars
Uncut	8/10

Lighthouse is the fifth studio album by American musician David Crosby, released on October 21, 2016, by GroundUP Music. The cover was photographed at Felgueiras Lighthouse, Oporto, Portugal.

== Accolades ==
Publication	Accolade	Year	Rank
Mojo	The 50 Best Albums of 2016	2016	34

== Track listing ==
All tracks are written by David Crosby, with additional contributors noted.

No.	Title	Writer(s)	Length
1.	"Things We Do for Love"	Michael League	4:15
2.	"The Us Below"	League, Marcus Eaton	3:41
3.	"Drive Out to the Desert"		4:13
4.	"Look in Their Eyes"	League	4:37
5.	"Somebody Other Than You"	League	4:23
6.	"The City"	League	4:45
7.	"Paint You a Picture"	Marc Cohn	4:23
8.	"What Makes It So"		4:00
9.	"By the Light of Common Day"	Becca Stevens	6:14

== Personnel ==
- David Crosby – vocals, acoustic guitar (1–5, 7, 8), guitar percussion (6), 12-string electric guitar (7)
- Michael League – vocals (1–6, 8, 9), acoustic guitar (1–6, 8, 9), 12-string acoustic guitar (1, 5), electric guitar (1, 2, 4–6, 9), acoustic bass (1, 2, 5, 7, 9), hammertone guitar (2, 9), electric bass (4, 6), guitar percussion (4), baritone guitar (6, 8), 12-string electric guitar (6), double bass (8)
- Cory Henry – organ (6, 8)
- Bill Laurance – acoustic piano (7, 9)
- Becca Stevens – vocals (9)
- Michelle Willis – vocals (9)

== Production ==
- Michael League – producer
- Fabrice Dupont – co-producer, recording, mixing
- Patrick MacDougall – vocal recording (2, 6)
- Bill Lane – assistant engineer
- Rich Tosi – assistant engineer
- Ed Wong – assistant engineer
- Greg Calbi – mastering at Sterling Sound (New York City, New York)
- David Crosby – art direction
- Jan Dee – art direction
- Emilia Canas Mendes – artwork
- Eduardo Texeria de Souza and Bamboo Studios – photography

== Charts ==
Chart (2016)	Peak position
Belgian Albums (Ultratop Flanders)	151
Belgian Albums (Ultratop Wallonia)	121
Dutch Albums (Album Top 100)	91
French Albums (SNEP)	135
Italian Albums (FIMI)	56
Scottish Albums (OCC)	67
US Billboard 200	117
