= Forq =

American jazz fusion band

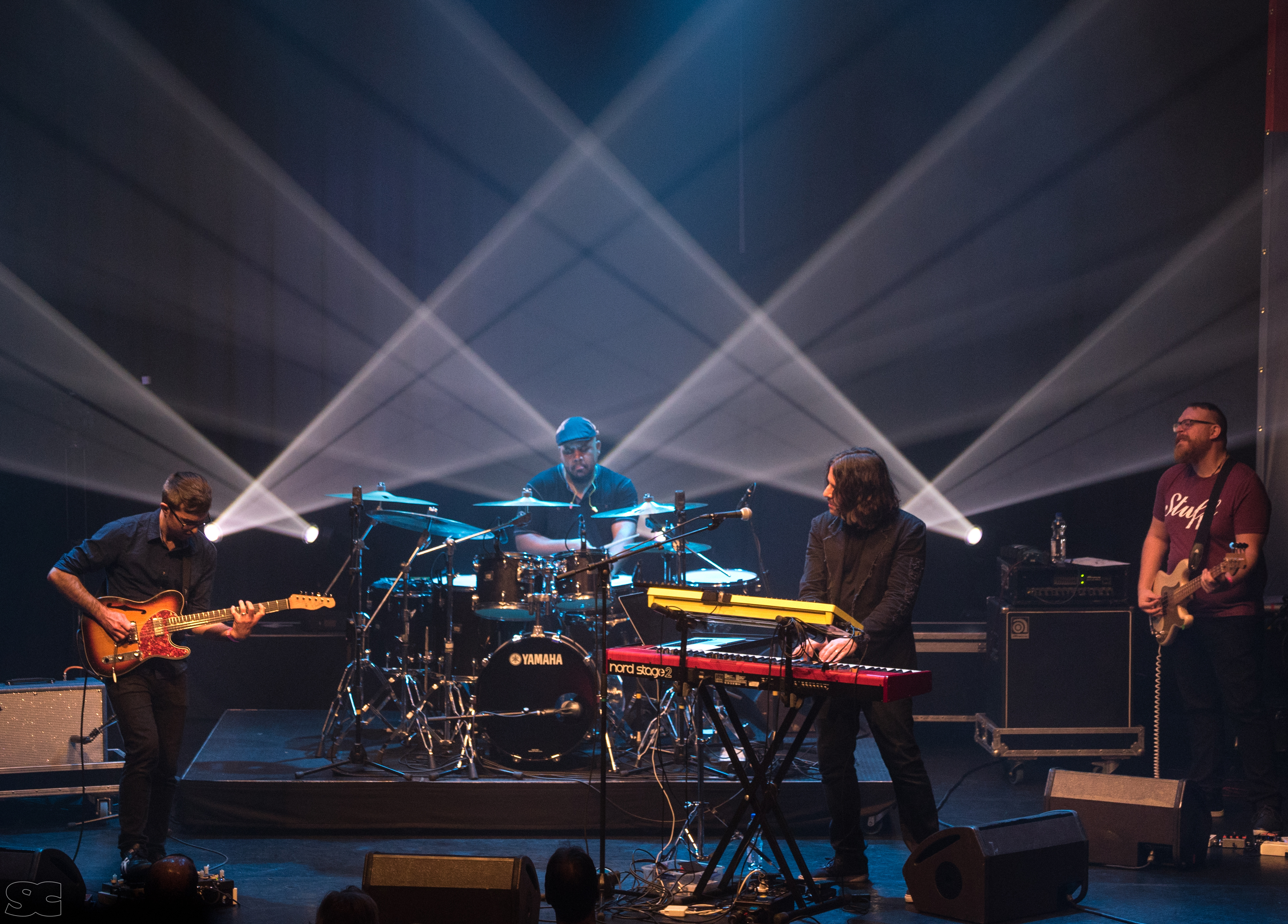
- Forq live in concert in The Hague, Netherlands

Background information
- Genres: Jazz fusion
- Years active: 2012–present
- Label: GroundUPmusic
- Spinoff of: Snarky Puppy
- Members: Henry Hey; Jason 'JT' Thomas; Chris McQueen; Kevin Scott
- Past members: Michael League; Adam Rogers
- Website: forqmusic.com

Forq (pronounced "fork") is an American jazz fusion band from New York and Texas.

== History ==
Forq was co-founded by keyboardist Henry Hey and Snarky Puppy member, bassist Michael League. The original formation of the band included guitarist Adam Rogers, and drummer Jason "JT" Thomas. Hey, a founding member of the band Rudder, had played a few Rudder shows, sharing the bill with Snarky Puppy before suggesting a collaboration with League, starting with a few live shows in New York City. The group's debut self-titled album was released on Snarky Puppy's label, GroundUP Music, in 2014.

Rogers left the group and was replaced by Snarky Puppy guitarist Chris McQueen early in 2015 prior to a tour of Europe. The group's sophomore album, Batch, was issued in June 2015. The group played at Snarky Puppy's GroundUp Festival in February 2017 and released a third album, Threq, in mid-2017. Since the release of Threq, bassist Michael League has been replaced by bassist Kevin Scott.

== Discography ==
- Forq (GroundUP Music, 2014)
- Batch (GroundUP Music, 2015)
- Threq (GroundUP Music, 2017)
- Four (Forq, 2019)
- Aargau (Newvelle, 2019)
- Four (Remixt) (GroundUp, 2021)
- Big Party (GroundUp, 2024)
