= Walter Kissling =

Costa Rican businessman (1931–2002)

- Walter, in his office during a newspaper interview.
- Born: April 25, 1931; Limón, Costa Rica
- Died: January 28, 2002 (aged 70); San José, Costa Rica
- Occupation: Former CEO of H.B. Fuller

Melvin Walter Kissling Gam (April 25, 1931 – January 28, 2002) was a Costa Rican businessman who became one of the first Central Americans to lead a Fortune 500 company. He is also known for having played an important role in the founding of the INCAE Business School campus in Costa Rica, as well as founding the Costa Rican non-profit organization Asociación de Empresarios para el Desarrollo.

== Early life ==
Walter Kissling was born to Walter Kissling Rickli and Adela Gam Secen in Limón, Costa Rica on April 25, 1931. His father was of Swiss descent, and his mother came from Vienna, Austria. In a newspaper interview in 1998 he mentioned his mother as a driving force in his life. “She was a fighting woman. She descended from wealthy family from Vienna, who had lost it all in the First World War. During all of my infancy, one of very limited means, it was through my mother’s efforts that I was able to study and get ahead.”

Kissling graduated from Colegio Seminario in San José in 1948. After graduation he worked selling cheese and as a receptionist in the Hotel Europa in downtown San José. During his work at the hotel, he met a North American businessman who gave him 2 pamphlets and told him that if he learned them by heart he would hire him as a pharmaceutical sales representative. This is how he started working at Wyeth International, where he worked for 7 years.

Kissling never graduated from college.

== Work in Kativo and H.B. Fuller ==
Seeking to advance his career, Kissling joined Kativo Chemical in 1953. At that time the company was a small business that fabricated the Protecto brand of paints in a workshop in Sabana Sur, San José. He worked there for 10 years and was tasked with leading the expansion of the company to the Central American markets.

With the acquisition of Kativo Chemical by H.B. Fuller in 1967, Kissling was appointed as vicepresident for Latin America, all the while maintaining his role as general manager at Kativo Chemical. He then led the opening of several H.B Fuller manufacturing plants throughout Latin America.

He went on to serve the company in significant leadership positions, including senior vice president of international operations, and executive vice president and chief operating officer. In 1995 he was named chief executive officer of H.B. Fuller, serving in this capacity until his retirement in 1998. He also was a 34-year member of Fuller's board of directors.

Upon his retirement, then-H.B. Fuller chairman and CEO Al Stroucken said Kissling "positioned H.B. Fuller for the 21st century," crediting him with leading the company's international expansion and development of an advanced information-technology system.

== Other activities ==
Kissling had an active role in the founding of the Costa Rican Campus (now named after him) of the INCAE Business School in 1984, after the situation of the INCAE campus in Nicaragua became unstable due to the Nicaraguan Revolution. He was also president and a 16-year member of the board of directors of INCAE.

He was president of La Camara de Industrias de Costa Rica and served on the boards of several companies including: La Nación, Atlas Eléctrica, Banco Banex, and Pentair Inc.

== Personal life ==
Kissling was married to Cecilia Kissling; the couple had five children and nine grandchildren.

== Later life ==
Kissling spent most of his later life promoting Corporate Social Responsibility in Costa Rica. In 1997 he founded Asociación Empresarial para el Desarrollo a non profit organization that promotes Corporate Social Responsibility in Costa Rica.

He died on January 28, 2002, following a battle with cancer. He was 70.

== Legacy ==
The INCAE Business School named its Campus in Costa Rica in his honor. Many Costa Rican business leaders consider Walter Kissling as the Franklin Chang-Diaz (notable Costa Rican - American astronaut) of Costa Rican business because of his achievements.
