= Attacca Quartet =

American string quartet

- Origin: New York, New York, United States
- Instrument: String quartet
- Years active: 2003–present
- Members: Amy Schroeder; Andrew Yee; Nathan Schram; Domenic Salerni
- Past members: So Jin Kim; Gillian Gallagher; Keiko Tokunaga; Luke Fleming
- Website: http://attaccaquartet.com

The Attacca Quartet is an American string quartet. It was established in 2003 by Amy Schroeder, first violin, and Andrew Yee, cello, while both were students at the Juilliard School. Since 2020 the other members have been Domenic Salerni, second violin, and Nathan Schram, viola. Its repertoire ranges from Classical to contemporary.

In 2020, the quartet won a Grammy Award for Best Chamber Music/Small Ensemble Performance for its collaboration with Caroline Shaw on the album Orange. Three years later it won the same award for recording another Shaw work, Evergreen.
