= Margaret Kissling =

English missionary (1808–1891)

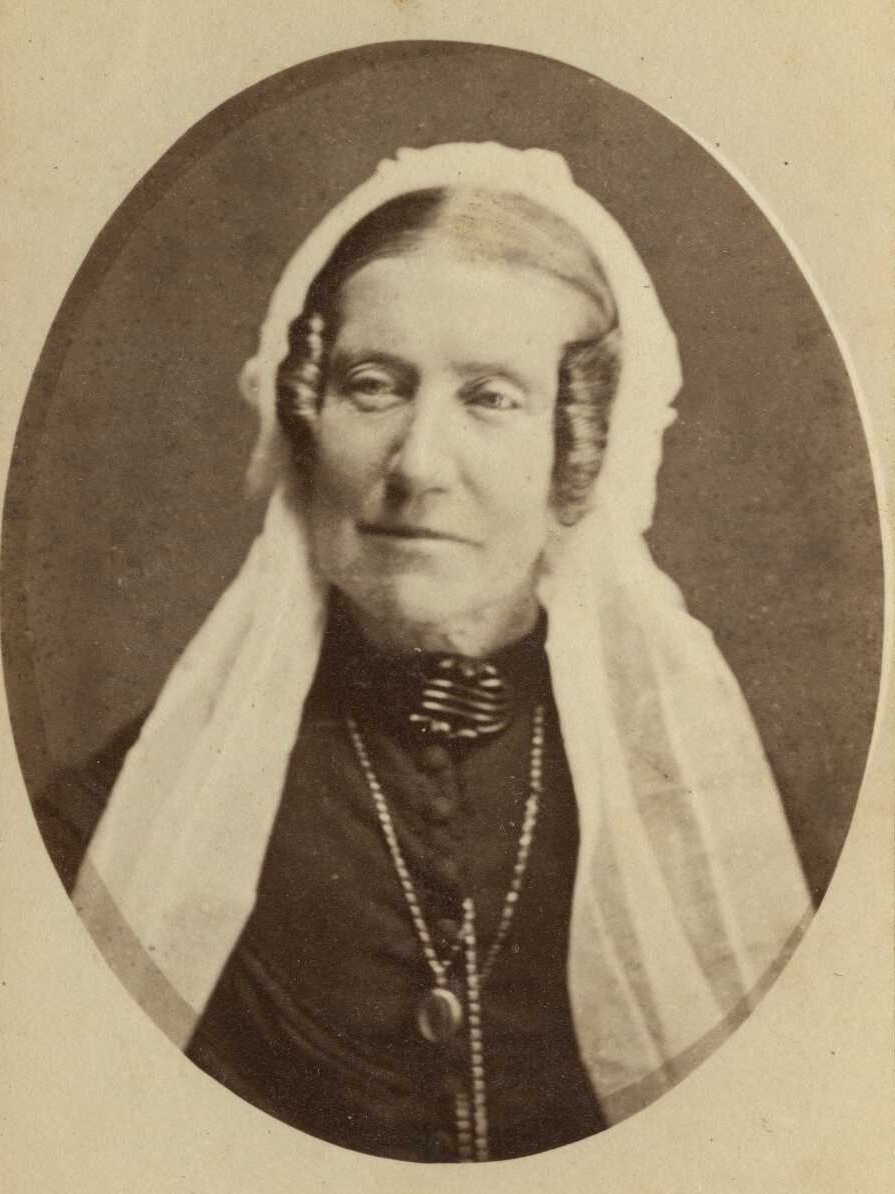
- Born: 18 August 1808; Kingston upon Hull, Yorkshire, England
- Died: 20 September 1891 (aged 83); Parnell, New Zealand
- Other name: Margaret Moxon
- Occupation: Missionary
- Spouse: George Adam Kissling (married 1837)

Margaret Kissling (18 August 1808–20 September 1891) was an English Anglican missionary in New Zealand. In New Zealand, she was also a homemaker and teacher.

== Biography ==
She was born in Kingston upon Hull, Yorkshire, England on 18 August 1808, the daughter of Margaret Heaton and John Moxon, a businessman and banker.

She married George Adam Kissling on 3 July 1837 at Islington. They were sent to New Zealand by the Church Missionary Society and worked at the Kawakawa (Hicks Bay) Mission from 1843 to 1846.

The ill health of her husband resulted in a move to Auckland. George and Margaret Kissling opened a Māori girls boarding school in Kohimarama. George Kissling died 9 November 1865.

Margaret Kissling died on 20 September 1891.

A commemorative plaque was unveiled in November 2015 in her hometown of Kingston upon Hull.
