= Metzinger =

Metzinger (German for "pedigree" or "person") is a surname. Notable people with the surname include:

- Ann Metzinger (1931–2022), American nutritionist
- Jean Metzinger (1883–1956), French painter
- Kraig Metzinger (born 1963), US actor
- Thomas Metzinger (born 1958), German philosopher
