= George Kissling =

George Adam Kissling
- Born: 3 July 1805; Murr, Baden-Württemberg, Germany
- Died: 9 November 1865 (aged 60); Parnell, Auckland, New Zealand
- Occupation: Missionary
- Spouse: Margaret Moxon (married 1837)
- Relatives: Herbert Kissling (grandson)

George Adam Kissling (3 July 1805 – 9 November 1865) was the second Archdeacon of Waitemata.

== Life and career ==
Kissling was born in Murr, Baden-Württemberg, in Germany. A Lutheran missionary who studied at the University of Basel, Kissling served with the German Mission Society in Liberia and Sierra Leone before ill-health led him to go to England. He married Margaret Moxon on 3 July 1837 at Islington, London. He was ordained an Anglican priest in 1841 and the following year emigrated to New Zealand.

The Kisslings were sent by the Church Missionary Society to work at the Kawakawa (Hicks Bay) Mission from 1843 to 1846. George Kissling's ill health resulted in a move to Auckland.

George and Margaret Kissling opened a Māori girls boarding school in the Auckland suburb of Kohimarama. He taught students of theology at St John's College, including Riwai Te Ahu. In 1859 he was appointed Archdeacon of Waitemata.

After some years of illness, Kissling died on 9 November 1865, aged 60.
