= Scott Kiesling =

Scott Fabius Kiesling is a professor in the Department of Linguistics at the University of Pittsburgh. With the completion of his dissertation, Language, Gender, and Power in Fraternity of Young Men's Discourse, Kiesling received a PhD in linguistics in 1996 from Georgetown University, where he previously completed an M.S. in linguistics. He also received a B.A. in linguistics from the University of Pennsylvania in 1989. Kiesling has held previous academic positions at the University of Sydney and The Ohio State University.

Scott Kiesling is best known for his studies of language and identity, particularly the construction of masculinity and gender. His work treats dominant social categories such as masculinity, heterosexuality and whiteness as social constructions achieved via discourse and language behavior, among other social behaviors. In his work with American fraternity members, Kiesling suggests that men are expected to demonstrate both solidarity, a condition of closeness with other men, and heterosexuality, which precludes intimacy with other men. He suggests that one way to show these complicated relationships is through the use of "cool" language elements such as the word dude or sundry non-standard language variants.

Kiesling is also known for work in sociolinguistics and language variation in both American English and Australian English. For example, in a 1996 paper, Kiesling suggests that some American men use alveolar -ING tokens (e.g. walkin' rather than walking) to index power roles associated with working-class men, and indirectly with the values of hard work and physical strength. Similarly, a 2005 paper finds that Greek and Lebanese speakers in Australia pronounce word-final -ER (as in brother) further back in vocal space and longer than Anglo speakers do. For some speakers this backed variant is indexical of Greek identity, but in general "creates a stance of authoritative connection, a linguistic resource which is also potentially available to Anglo-Australians."

Kiesling is the author of a textbook on sociolinguistic variation entitled Language Variation and Change.

Kiesling is also co-editor, with Christina Bratt Paulston, of Intercultural Discourse and Communication: The Essential Readings, a book of readings on intercultural discourse for students in sociolinguistics, anthropology, communication or other related fields.
