= Grace E. Kissling =

American biostatistician

Grace Elizabeth Kissling is an American biostatistician who works at the National Institute of Environmental Health Sciences as chief statistician for the National Toxicology Program.

Kissling graduated from Georgia Institute of Technology in 1977 with a bachelor's degree in applied mathematics. She completed her Ph.D. in biostatistics in 1981 at the University of North Carolina at Chapel Hill. Her dissertation, supervised by Lawrence L. Kupper, was A Generalized Model for Analysis of Nonindependent Observations.

After completing her doctorate, she joined the faculty of the Louisiana State University Medical Center as an assistant professor, and then in 1986 moved to the Department of Mathematical Sciences at the University of North Carolina at Greensboro. She became a full professor there in 1999, served as acting head of the department from 2000 to 2001, and added an adjunct affiliation in the Department of Public Health Education at Greensboro in 2001. She was also an adjunct faculty member at the University of New Mexico from 1996 to 2002. She moved from Greensboro to the National Toxicology Program in 2003.

In 2011, Kissling was elected as a Fellow of the American Statistical Association.
