= Lydia Kiesling =

American author and literary critic

Lydia Kiesling is an American author and literary critic. Her debut novel, The Golden State, was published in September 2018 by MCD Books, a division of Farrar, Straus, and Giroux. From 2016 to 2019 she was the editor of the San Francisco-based literary magazine The Millions.

== The Golden State ==
The Golden State follows a new mother, Daphne, whose Turkish husband, ensnarled in visa complications, is unable to return to the US; overwhelmed by the demands of parenthood, Daphne takes leave from a bureaucratic office job at a large university to go on a road trip to rural Northern California with her daughter. Literary critics have described the book as a subversion of traditional American road trip tropes in literary narrative, as well as a "journey in the visceral and material realities of motherhood" (Sarah Blackwood, The New Yorker). The book was long-listed for the 2018 Center for Fiction First Novel Prize. It also earned Kiesling acclaim from the National Book Foundation, which named her one of their "5 Under 35," a recognition for debut writers.

== Mobility ==
Mobility follows Elizabeth "Bunny" Glenn from her time as an American teenager living in Azerbaijan with her foreign service family during the collapse of the Soviet Union into the new millennium as she comes of age and develops a career in the oil industry in Texas. The novel addresses themes of "climate change, capitalism and personal accountability.

Keisling has stated that Oil! by Upton Sinclair was an influence for her novel.

== Education, prior work, and personal life ==
Kiesling received an undergraduate degree in Comparative Literature from Hamilton College in Clinton, New York. She taught English in Istanbul, Turkey soon after graduating. She has studied Turkic languages and is an alumna of the Critical Language Scholarship Program.

Prior to writing The Golden State, Kiesling directed outreach at UC Berkeley's Center for Middle Eastern Studies for 3 years, leaving in May 2016.

Kiesling's father is the former U.S. diplomat John Brady Kiesling.

Kiesling worked as the campaign manager for Portland City Council member Tiffany Koyama Lane during the 2024 Portland City Council election, successfully getting her elected in District 3.
