= John Brady Kiesling =

American author and diplomat (born 1957)

- Born: 1957 (age 68–69); Houston, Texas
- Education: University of California, Berkeley; Swarthmore College
- Occupations: Diplomat; Author; Lecturer
- Notable work: Diplomacy Lessons: Realism for an Unloved Superpower; ToposText; Greek Urban Warriors: Resistance and Terrorism 1967-2014

John Brady Kiesling is a former U.S. diplomat and the author of Diplomacy Lessons: Realism for an Unloved Superpower (Potomac Books, 2006) and the ToposText classics/archaeology mobile application.

== Diplomat ==
An archaeologist/ancient historian by training, Kiesling entered the foreign service in 1983. He supported the multilateralist foreign policy of former president George H. W. Bush and the limited purposes of the 1991 Gulf War.

He served in Israel, Morocco, Greece, Washington, and Armenia, returning to Athens as chief of the political section of the U.S. Embassy in 2000.

He was the first of three U.S. foreign service officers to resign, on February 25, 2003, to protest against the 2003 invasion of Iraq. His letter of resignation to Secretary of State Colin Powell was posted by The New York Times and circulated widely.

Mr. Kiesling's personal crisis began in October, at a diplomatic party in Athens. He ran into an old friend and source from a stint in Athens 15 years earlier, a Communist who had spent years in Greek prisons. The pair had always sparred politically, but a warm friendship endured. He holed up and read, but the cloud of despair wouldn't lift. Finally, in late February, when Mr. Bush made clear he wouldn't be defied, even by the U.N. Security Council, Mr. Kiesling drafted his resignation letter and quit. Suddenly, he felt "a certain lucidity, a strong, liberating feeling," he says.

== Writing ==
After his resignation, he spent a year as a visiting fellow/lecturer at Princeton University, and then returned to Athens. Until May 2009, he wrote a monthly column called "Diplomat in the Ruins" in the Athens News in Greece.

Kiesling wrote Rediscovering Armenia (2003), an open-access guide to Armenia; Diplomacy Lessons: Realism for an Unloved Superpower (Potomac Books, 2006); and Greek Urban Warriors: Resistance and Terrorism 1967-2014 (Lycabettus Press 2014). The latter is a "meticulous" history of Revolutionary Organization 17 November, the Greek terrorist group active from 1975 until 2002. He and the Plaka neighborhood of Athens are described in pages 38–46 of Eric Weiner's The Geography of Genius.

== Personal life ==
Kiesling lives in Athens, Greece, and "his happiest moments…are spent tramping over remote, thorn-covered hillsides or as an archaeological volunteer (Ancient Corinth 1980, Ancient Nemea 1981, Vorotan Armenia 2007, Aphrodisias 1982, Zagora 2014, Methone 2015). His current interests include ancient Greek religion and Greek topography."

Kiesling is the father of the novelist and critic Lydia Kiesling.

== Publications ==
- Rediscovering Armenia: An Archaeological/Touristic Gazetteer and Map Set for the Historical Monuments of Armenia. Yerevan: Tigran Mets, 2001. ISBN 99930-52-28-0. (Kiesling, John Brady (January 2001). "PDF version". Yerevan: Tigran Mets Pub.) 2nd ed. Matit, 2005. ISBN 99941-0-121-8.
- Diplomacy Lessons: Realism for an Unloved Superpower. Washington, DC: Potomac, 2006. ISBN 1-59797-017-4.
- Greek Urban Warriors: Resistance and Terrorism 1967–2014. Athens: Lycabettus, 2014. ISBN 9789607269553.
