= Kisling =

Kisling is a German language surname. It may refer to:

- Jérémie Kisling (born 1976), Swiss singer-songwriter
- Moïse Kisling (1891–1953), Polish painter
- Richard D. Kisling (1923–1985), American aviator

== Other uses ==
- Gutten Kisling, fictional character in the game Okage: Shadow King

== See also ==
- Kissling
