= INCAE Business School =

Private graduate business school in Costa Rica

Coordinates: 10.0028°N 84.2769°W

- Instituto Centroamericano de Administración de Empresas
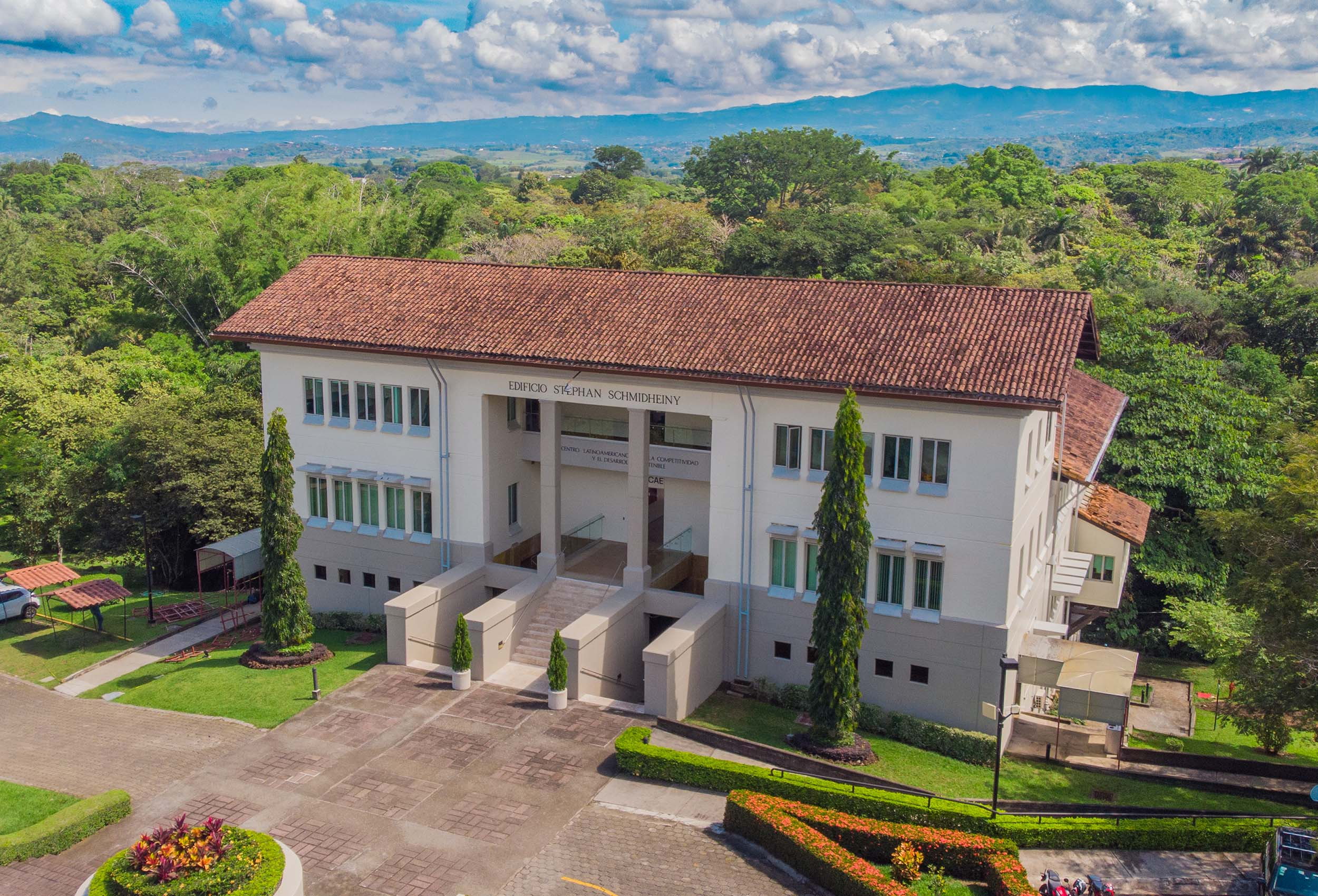
- Walter Kissling Gam Campus in Alajuela, Costa Rica
- Type: Private business school
- Established: 1964
- Rector: Camelia Ilie Cardoza
- Location: Alajuela, Costa Rica
- Campus: Walter Kissling Gam Campus
- Website: incae.edu

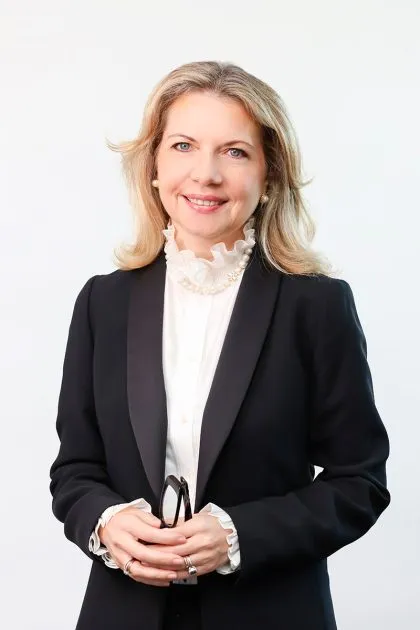
Camelia Ilie Cardoza, Rector of INCAE Business School

INCAE Business School (Spanish: Instituto Centroamericano de Administración de Empresas; English: Central American Institute of Business Administration) is a private graduate business school established in 1964. The institution originated through an initiative involving Central American governments and representatives of the region's business sector, with academic assistance from Harvard Business School. Its principal academic location is the Walter Kissling Gam Campus in La Garita, Alajuela, Costa Rica, and it operates an Executive Center in Panama City. Its activities include master's degree programmes, executive education, online education, programmes for organisations and applied research related to management and the economic and social development of Latin America.

== History ==
=== Foundation and early years ===
The origins of INCAE date to March 1963, when United States president John F. Kennedy met in Costa Rica with the presidents of the Central American countries. The meeting included discussions on economic development, regional integration and the need to strengthen management education for the public and private sectors. Kennedy subsequently asked George P. Baker, then dean of Harvard Business School, to examine the possibility of establishing a management programme in Central America.

The project was developed with the participation of government and business representatives from the region. Harvard Business School assisted with the academic design and delivery of INCAE's early programmes. The institution later operated independently from Harvard while continuing to use the case method as one component of its teaching model.

The first Advanced Management Programme, known by its Spanish abbreviation PAG, was held in Antigua Guatemala between July and August 1964. The act establishing the institution was signed at the conclusion of the programme. On 24 October 1964, INCAE was officially established with its headquarters in Managua, Nicaragua.

Clark Wilson became INCAE's first rector on 1 January 1967. In January 1968, the first cohort of the Master in Business Administration programme, then known by the Spanish abbreviation MAE, began with 42 participants from six countries. Ernesto Cruz became the second rector in July of that year. The Managua campus was inaugurated on 20 June 1969, and the first graduating class, comprising 29 participants, completed the programme the following day.

From its early years, INCAE incorporated the case method into its teaching. The method involves the analysis and discussion of situations faced by businesses, public institutions and other organisations. Although its introduction was connected with the early involvement of Harvard Business School, INCAE's faculty subsequently developed cases and teaching materials based on Latin American companies, governments and institutions.

During the 1970s, the institution added programmes in areas including public management, banking, planning, agribusiness and resource administration. Following the December 1972 Managua earthquake, INCAE researchers participated in the preparation of a preliminary assessment of the damage caused by the disaster.

=== Establishment in Costa Rica ===
INCAE's establishment in Costa Rica was formalised through an agreement with the Costa Rican government in May 1979. Construction of a permanent location began during the early 1980s. The Alajuela campus was inaugurated on 1 April 1984 and was later named the Walter Kissling Gam Campus.

Following the opening of the Costa Rica campus, the master's programme was offered primarily in Alajuela. The MAE programme temporarily ceased operating in Nicaragua and returned to the Francisco de Sola Campus in 1996, when it began to be offered in parallel with the programme in Costa Rica. An executive format was added in Nicaragua in 2000.

During the 1990s and 2000s, INCAE expanded its research and executive education activities. In 1996, it established the Latin American Center for Competitiveness and Sustainable Development, known as CLACDS, to conduct work related to competitiveness, public policy and sustainable development. Other academic centres, chairs and programmes were developed in fields including entrepreneurship, natural resources, leadership, business economics, technology, health and social responsibility.

During the first decades of the 21st century, the school also expanded its academic formats through face-to-face, hybrid and online programmes.

=== Closure of the Nicaragua campus and opening in Panama ===
In September 2023, the Government of Nicaragua cancelled INCAE's legal status. As a result, the Francisco de Sola Campus ceased operations, and the institution stated that it would continue its activities from its campus in Costa Rica.

That year, INCAE announced the establishment of an Executive Center in Panama. The center began its activities in April 2024 and was created to host executive programmes, academic meetings and projects involving companies and other organisations. Its facilities are located in Costa del Este, Panama City.

The Panama facility operates as an executive center rather than as a residential academic campus equivalent to the one in Costa Rica. Following the closure of the Francisco de Sola Campus, the Walter Kissling Gam Campus remained INCAE's principal academic and residential location.

On 15 January 2025, Camelia Ilie Cardoza became INCAE's tenth rector, succeeding Enrique Bolaños Abaunza. She was the first woman to hold the rectorship since the institution was founded.

== Academic activity ==
INCAE's initial academic activities were centred on the Advanced Management Programme and the Master in Business Administration. Its postgraduate and executive education offerings were expanded during subsequent decades.

As of 2026, its full-time master's degrees comprised the Master of Business Administration, the Master in Management, Innovation & Technology and the Master in Management, Sustainability and AI.

Its executive programmes included the MBA Online, the Executive MBA, the Executive Master in Business Analytics and AI, the Executive Master in Finance, the Executive Master in Marketing and Sales and the Executive Master in Operations and Supply Chain.

The institution also provides open-enrolment executive education programmes, online education and programmes designed for companies, public institutions and other organisations. The composition of the portfolio changes as programmes are created, updated or replaced.

The case method continues to be used alongside applied projects, simulations, research and assignments involving organisations. Faculty profiles published by the institution list professors with doctoral education from universities in different countries and academic interests related to strategy, economics, finance, marketing, operations, technology, sustainability, leadership and public policy.

== Locations and alumni community ==
The Walter Kissling Gam Campus is located in La Garita, Alajuela. It is a residential campus containing classrooms, a library, study areas, executive education facilities, residences and natural areas. It was the second campus established by INCAE and, after the closure of the Francisco de Sola Campus, became its only location with the characteristics of an academic and residential campus.

In 2025, INCAE reported that the greenhouse-gas emissions and removals inventory for its 2024 educational and operational activities at the Walter Kissling Gam Campus had received carbon-neutral verification from the Institute of Technical Standards of Costa Rica, INTECO. The verification was carried out under the criteria of Costa Rica's Country Programme for Carbon Neutrality 2.0.

According to figures published by INCAE, its alumni community comprises more than 22,000 graduates and includes members of more than 16 nationalities. These figures are based on the institution's alumni records and may change as new classes graduate.

== Accreditations and rankings ==
INCAE is accredited by the Association to Advance Collegiate Schools of Business (AACSB), the Association of MBAs (AMBA) and the EFMD Quality Improvement System (EQUIS). The simultaneous holding of these three accreditations is commonly known in business education as triple accreditation or the “Triple Crown”.

The institution received AACSB accreditation in 1999, EQUIS accreditation in 2004 and AMBA accreditation in 2018. The current directories of the three organisations list INCAE among their accredited business schools.

AACSB's institutional profile also lists INCAE as accredited by the Southern Association of Colleges and Schools Commission on Colleges.

INCAE programmes have appeared in regional and international business-school rankings. The results cover different programmes, delivery formats and years and therefore do not constitute a single overall ranking of the institution.

The Financial Times institutional profile for INCAE lists four programmes that have appeared in its rankings.

In the 2026 Financial Times executive education rankings, INCAE's open-enrolment programmes were placed 33rd among 90 institutions, while its customised corporate programmes were placed 71st among 100 institutions.

INCAE's Executive MBA was placed 60th in the Financial Times international Executive MBA ranking published in 2025.

In the QS Global MBA Rankings 2026: Latin America, INCAE's full-time MBA was placed second in the region.

In the QS Executive MBA Rankings 2026, INCAE's Executive MBA was placed third in Latin America.

QS's 2026 institutional profile also listed INCAE's Executive MBA in 96th place globally and placed the institution 98th in its business and management subject classification.

In the 2026 rankings published by CEO Magazine, INCAE's MBA was included in the publication's Global MBA “Tier One” group. Its Executive MBA was tied for seventh place in the Global EMBA ranking, while its Online MBA was placed fourth in the international online MBA table.

== Rectors ==
INCAE's institutional chronology identifies ten rectors since the establishment of the school. The periods below are based on the dates of succession recorded in the chronology.

| No. | Rector | Period |
|---|---|---|
| 1 | Clark Wilson | 1 January 1967 – 1 July 1968 |
| 2 | Ernesto Cruz | 1 July 1968 – January 1981 |
| 3 | Harry Strachan | January 1981 – January 1982 |
| 4 | Marc Lindenberg | January 1982 – 12 September 1987 |
| 5 | Melvyn Copen | 12 September 1987 – September 1991 |
| 6 | Brizio Biondi-Morra | September 1991 – April 1999 |
| 7 | Roberto Artavia Loría | April 1999 – 1 June 2007 |
| 8 | Arturo Condo | 1 June 2007 – 21 May 2015 |
| 9 | Enrique Bolaños Abaunza | 21 May 2015 – 15 January 2025 |
| 10 | Camelia Ilie Cardoza | 15 January 2025 – present |
