= Jérémie Kisling =

- Born: Jérémie Tschanz; 27 February 1976 (age 50)
- Origin: Lausanne, Vaud, Switzerland
- Occupation: Singer-songwriter
- Website: http://www.myspace.com/therealjeremiekisling

Jérémie Kisling (born Jérémie Tschanz) is a singer songwriter born on 27 February 1976 in Lausanne, Switzerland. He explored several ways of expression until he decided to start singing. His songs describe a melancholic, fragile and impishly humorous universe. His deliberately old fashioned arrangements of vintage synths (Moog, Korg, Wurlitzer), insisting trumpets and light guitar tunes create genuinely enchanting harmonies.

His second album, 'Le Ours' peaked at 59 on the Swiss charts. His third album, 'Antimatière', debuted at 39 on the Swiss charts.

== Discography ==
- Monsieur Obsolète, 2003
- Le Ours, 2005
- Antimatière, 2009
- Tout m'échappe, 2013
- Malhabiles, 2016
