= Gary Novak =

American drummer

Gary Novak (born in 1969) is an American session drummer who has collaborated with numerous artists as varied as George Benson, Maynard Ferguson, Chick Corea Elektric Band, Brandon Fields, Lee Ritenour, Michael McDonald, Natalie Cole, David Sanborn, Anita Baker, Andrew WK, Bob Berg, Allan Holdsworth, Robben Ford, Michael Landau, Eros Ramazzotti, Tiziano Ferro, Cesare Cremonini, Jimmy Haslip, Alanis Morissette, David Crosby, Larry Carlton and Travis Carlton. He is the son of jazz pianist Larry Novak.

== Collaborations ==
- Supposed Former Infatuation Junkie - Alanis Morissette (1998)
- The Sixteen Men of Tain - Allan Holdsworth (2000)
- Under Rug Swept - Alanis Morissette (2002)
- To Whom It May Concern - Lisa Marie Presley (2003)
- Take All My Loves: 9 Shakespeare Sonnets - Rufus Wainwright (2016)
- The Heart Speaks in Whispers - Corinne Bailey Rae (2016)
- Sky Trails - David Crosby (2017)
