= Michael League =

American musician (born 1984)

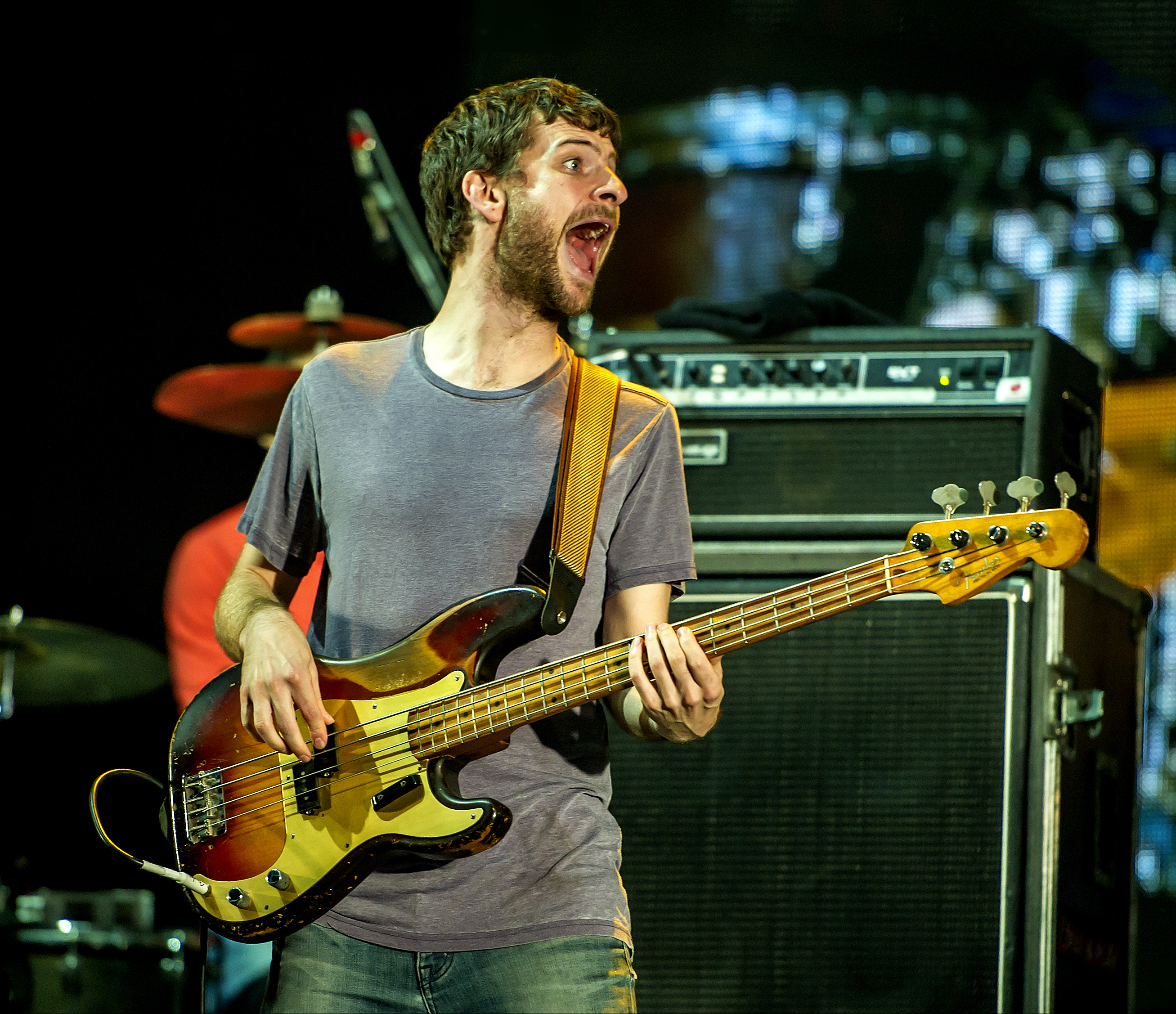
- League at the Heineken Jazzaldia

Background information
- Born: Michael Kellyrea League; April 24, 1984 (age 42); Long Beach, California, US
- Genres: Jazz; fusion; world music
- Instruments: Bass; guitar; keyboards
- Years active: 2004–present
- Member of: Snarky Puppy
- Formerly of: Forq

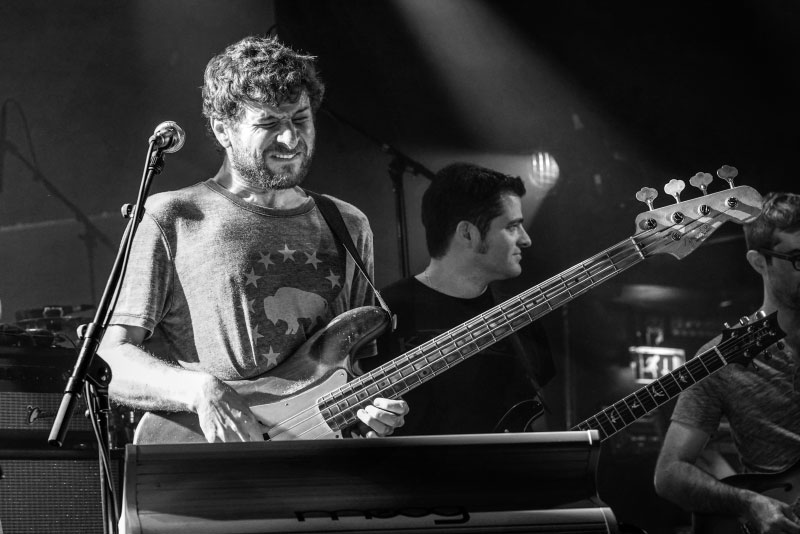
Michael League (2019) in Aarhus, Denmark

Michael League (born April 24, 1984) is an American composer, producer, and multi-instrumentalist. He is the bandleader of instrumental band Snarky Puppy and the international music ensemble Bokanté. He also founded the band Forq with keyboardist Henry Hey, and is also an owner and founder of the record label GroundUP Music. League has won five Grammy Awards.

== Early life ==
League was born in California on April 24, 1984. He was raised Catholic. He had an attraction to music from an early age and began playing guitar at 13 years old. He started playing bass at age 17, when he was requested to do so in his senior high school jazz band.

League went on to study jazz at the University of North Texas, then spent three years playing in Dallas's Gospel and R&B scene under the unofficial mentorship of keyboardist Bernard Wright. There he performed with gospel artists like Walter Hawkins, Kirk Franklin, Marvin Sapp, Myron Butler & Levi, and Israel Houghton, and frequently performed at the Potter's House. He was also a regular member of Erykah Badu's backing band, the Gritz. League moved to Brooklyn, New York, in 2009.

== Career ==
League formed Snarky Puppy in his freshman year of college at the University of North Texas, originally consisting of him and nine of his peers. He composed most of their original music, as well as produced all albums released by the band.

He has performed or recorded with artists from a variety of genres including Laura Mvula, Lalah Hathaway, Joe Walsh, Chris Thile, Michael McDonald, Terence Blanchard, Esperanza Spalding, Joshua Redman, Wayne Krantz, Chris Potter, Salif Keita, Eliades Ochoa, Fatoumata Diawara, Bassekou Kouyate, Susana Baca, and Kardeş Türküler. He served as musical director for David Crosby in his Lighthouse touring band, alongside Becca Stevens and Michelle Willis.

In 2014, League won his first Grammy Award for Best R&B Performance with Snarky Puppy and Lalah Hathaway for a live performance of the Brenda Russell and David Foster song "Something" on the Family Dinner – Volume 1 album. In 2016, Sylva, the collaborative album between Snarky Puppy and the Metropole Orkest and conducted by Jules Buckley, won a Grammy Award for Best Contemporary Instrumental Album, as did the band's follow-up album, Culcha Vulcha in 2017.; Snarky Puppy's 2020 album Live at the Royal Albert Hall, recorded before a sold-out crowd at the historic London venue, won the 2021 Grammy Award for Best Contemporary Instrumental Album.

League formed the world/blues ensemble Bokanté in 2016, and has produced two albums for the band: Strange Circles, and What Heat. Strange Circles was released on GroundUP Music and What Heat, also a collaboration with Jules Buckley and the Metropole Orkest, was released on September 28, 2018, on Real World Records. In 2019, What Heat was nominated in the Grammy Award for Best World Music Album category.

One number on David Crosby's League-produced Lighthouse album featured Crosby, League, Becca Stevens, and Michelle Willis (with Bill Laurence on piano). The quartet became the Lighthouse Band on Crosby's 2018 Here If You Listen album. The band then toured for six weeks in November and December 2018.

League relocated to Catalonia, Spain in 2020.

In 2021, League released his debut solo album So Many Me on GroundUP Music. League himself performed every instrument on the album, including vocals, synthesizer, and various Turkish, Moroccan, and Kurdish percussion instruments. The album received critical acclaim.

== Discography ==
=== Studio albums ===
Title	Year	Label
So Many Me	2021	GroundUP Music

=== Collaborative albums ===
Title	Year	Collaborator(s)	Label
Where You Wish You Were	2022	Bill Laurance	ACT Music
Keeping Company	2024	Bill Laurance	ACT Music

=== Singles ===
Title	Year	Label	Collaborator(s)
"Right Where I Fall"	2021	GroundUP Music	—
"In Your Mouth"	2021	GroundUP Music	—
"Botija de mi país"	2024	Portal Sessions	Ruben Rada, Julieta Rada, Bill Laurance
"MAGIC DANCE"	2025	naive / Waterbaby Music Inc	Nate Smith, Lionel Loueke

=== With Snarky Puppy ===
Title	Year	Label
Live at Uncommon Ground	2005	Ropeadope
The Only Constant	2006	Ropeadope
The World Is Getting Smaller	2007	Ropeadope
Bring Us the Bright	2008	Ropeadope
Tell Your Friends	2010	Ropeadope
groundUP	2012	GroundUP Music
Family Dinner – Volume 1	2013	GroundUP Music
Amkeni	2013	Ropeadope
We Like It Here	2014	GroundUP Music
Family Dinner – Volume 2	2016	GroundUP Music
Sylva	2015	GroundUP Music
Culcha Vulcha	2016	GroundUP Music
Immigrance	2019	GroundUP Music
Empire Central	2022	GroundUP Music
Live at the Royal Albert Hall	2020	GroundUP Music
Live at GroundUP Music Festival	2022	GroundUP Music

== Selected production work ==
Michael League has worked as producer or co-producer on 42 albums for artists including:

- David Crosby
- David Crosby, Michelle Willis, Becca Stevens, and Michael League
- Snarky Puppy (all thirteen albums)
- Bokanté + Metropole Orkest (conducted by Jules Buckley)
- Susana Baca
- Becca Stevens
- Bill Laurance
- Forq
- Lucy Woodward
- Alison Wedding
- Malika Tirolien
- Gisela João

== GroundUP Music Festival ==
In 2017, the GroundUP Music Festival, also known as GUMFest, debuted within the grounds of the North Beach Band Shell in North Beach, Miami. The first GroundUP Music Festival was initiated by Andy Hurwitz, directed by Paul Lehr, and artistically directed by Michael League. The festival features performances by Snarky Puppy all three nights, with a line-up curated by League that has featured David Crosby, Béla Fleck and the Flecktones, The Wood Brothers, Robert Glasper, Knower, Concha Buika, C4 Trio, Pedrito Martinez, Jojo Mayer + Nerve, Mark Guiliana's Beat Music, John Medeski's Mad Skillet, Charlie Hunter Trio, Laura Mvula, Eliades Ochoa, Esperanza Spalding, Lionel Loueke, Joshua Redman and Terence Blanchard, as well as the full GroundUP Music roster, among others. GroundUP Music Festival, Miami, is now planned as an annual event.
