= Michelle Willis =

Canadian composer and keyboarder

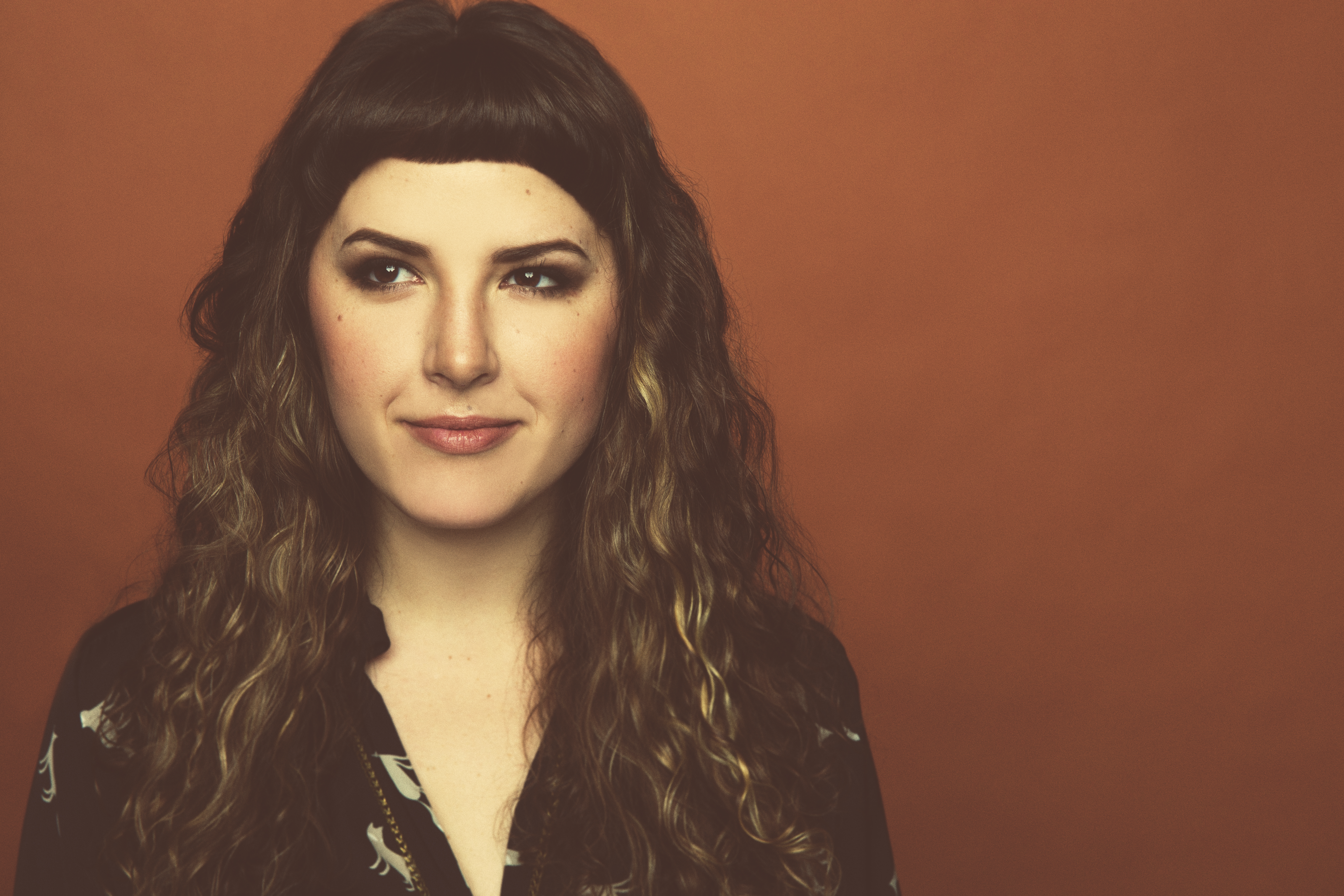
Michelle Willis in 2016

Michelle Willis (born November 6, 1986) is a British-born, Canadian-raised singer/songwriter and keyboard player. She performs regularly as a solo artist and as a side musician with David Crosby and Becca Stevens. She has also worked with Iggy & The Stooges, Laura Mvula, Snarky Puppy, The Parachute Club, and the Zac Brown Band.

== Career ==
After graduating from Humber College's Jazz program, Willis became a regular performer in Toronto's piano bars. In 2009, Three Metre Day, a modern roots band was formed with Willis on pump organ and vocals, Hugh Marsh on violin, and Don Rooke on slide guitar. In 2012, the band recorded the album Coasting Notes and wrote the score for the film Still Mine for which Willis, Rooke, and Marsh were nominated for a Canadian Screen Award. Marsh and Willis also recorded on Iggy & The Stooges final album, 2013's Ready to Die.

After building her résumé through a variety of collaborations and work as a session keyboardist and background singer, Willis signed a recording contract with groundUPmusic. Her debut solo album, See Us Through was released in Spring 2016. In a very positive review of the album, Cashbox Magazine Canada's Lee Fraser commented, "The fact that it’s her debut is pretty surprising, given the fact that Michelle has toured Europe, Canada and the US, and that every show she plays in her hometown of Toronto is filled to capacity with her adoring fans."

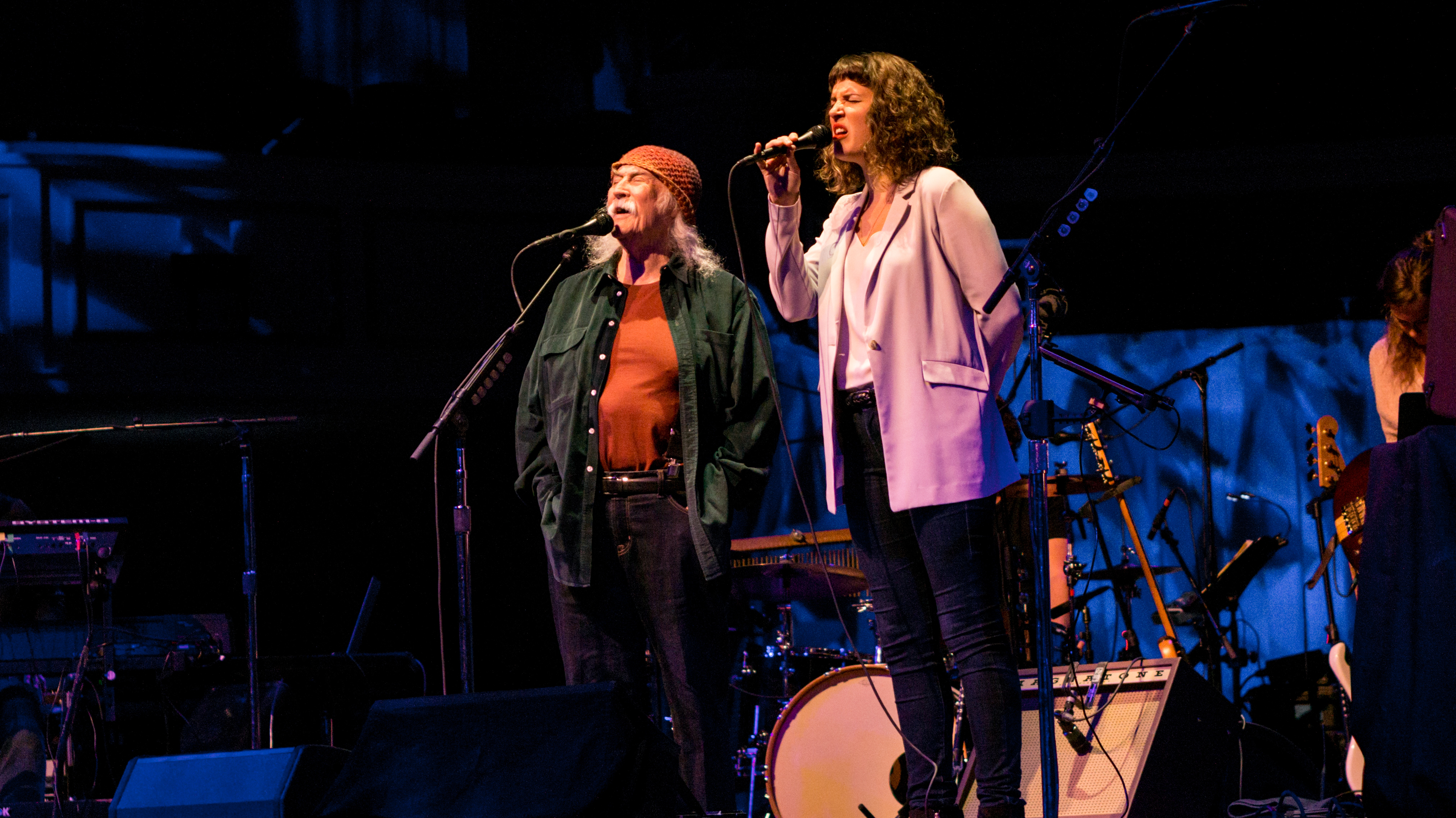
David Crosby and Michelle Willis at the Carmel Palladium Indianapolis in 2017

Willis was featured along with Laura Mvula on Snarky Puppy's Family Dinner – Volume 2. Among others also featured on that album were David Crosby and Becca Stevens. Producer Michael League then used himself, Willis, and Stevens to back Crosby on the Crosby-Stevens song "By the Light of Common Day" on Crosby's 2016 album Lighthouse. The quartet reunited as a real performing band on Crosby's 2018 Here If You Listen album, then toured for six weeks in late 2018. When speaking about "Janet", a song Willis wrote for that album, Crosby praised her as a singer:

Michelle Willis is... so startlingly talented, I don't even know where to start. She's probably one of the best singers I've ever heard in my life. Of all. Ever. Anybody. One of the very best, one of the top handful. I'm talking about, I live in the same world with Joni and Aretha, Bonnie, women who could sing. She's in that league. She's that good. She's an unbelievably talented singer.

== Discography ==
Rich is the Wanderer

- Released: 2025
- Format: Streaming

Just One Voice

- Released: 2022
- Format: CD, LP, Streaming
- Label: Ground Up Music
- Producer: Fab Dupont

See Us Through

- Released: 2016
- Format: Streaming

Shining Bits & Pieces

- Released: 2010
- Format: Streaming
