= Philippe Bas (actor) =

French actor (born 1973)

- Born: 31 October 1973 (age 52); Paris, France
- Occupation: Actor
- Years active: 1995–present

Philippe Bas (born 31 October 1973) is a French actor with credits in television, film, and on stage.

== Biography ==
Philippe Bas was born on 31 October 1973 in Paris. His formal training toward his career was from 1993 to 1996 at Cours Florent, a private drama school in Paris, established in 1967 by French theatre actor François Florent, and the alma mater to a wide array of other screen actors, including Isabelle Adjani, Gad Elmaleh, Diane Kruger, Guillaume Canet, and Audrey Tautou.

The 2023 release of Gilles Legardinier's Mr. Blake at Your Service! saw Bas starring alongside Fanny Ardent, who played the mistress of a manor in northern France that John Malkovich's widower character joins as house butler, alongside Bas and other eccentric household staff. As of August 2024, the film had grossed over US$2 million from releases in Europe, Australia, and New Zealand.

Bas was in a relationship with the French singer Lorie from 2010 to 2012.

== Credits ==
=== Theater ===
Year	Title	Author	Notes
1997	'Tis Pity She's a Whore	John Ford	
2000	The Trojan War Will Not Take Place	Jean Giraudoux	

=== Television and film ===
Year	Title	Role	Director	Notes
1995	Mémoires d'un jeune con	Un prisonnier	Patrick Aurignac	Feature film
1995	Julie Lescaut	Yann Prieur	Élisabeth Rappeneau	TV series (1 episode)
1995	Les années lycée	Grégoire	Manuel Poirier	TV series (1 episode)
1996	Navarro	Sylvain Garcia	Patrick Jamain	TV series (season 8, ep. 2)
1996	Elvis Aziz	Unknown	Frédéric Compain	TV movie
1996	Indaba	David	Marc Allavene d'Erlon & Jean-Louis Daniel	TV series (1 episode)
1997	Maigret	Louis	Pierre Joassin	TV series (season 7, ep. 1)
1997	Les Cordier, juge et flic	Marco	Gilles Béhat	TV series (season 5, ep. 6)
1997	Inspecteur Moretti	Dan	Gilles Béhat	TV series (1 episode)
1998	Un père en plus	Grégoire	Didier Albert	TV movie
1998	Madame le proviseur	Baptiste	Philippe Triboit	TV series (2 episodes)
1999	Farewell, Home Sweet Home	Moto driver	Otar Iosseliani	
1999	Les coquelicots sont revenus	Jean-François	Richard Bohringer	TV movie
1999	Julie Lescaut	Romain	Gilles Béhat	TV series (1 episode)
2000	Épouse-moi	Marceau	Harriet Marin	
2001	Te quiero	Jean	Manuel Poirier	
2001	Cavalcade	Pierre Gaillard	Daniel Janneau	TV movie
2001	Vent de poussières	Julien Chastelou	Renaud Bertrand	TV movie
2001	Les semailles et les moissons	Boris	Christian François	TV mini-series
2002	Les petites couleurs	Lucien	Patricia Plattner	
2002	Boulevard du Palais	Bertrand	Renaud Bertrand	TV series (1 episode)
2003	Michel Vaillant	Jean-Pierre Vaillant	Louis-Pascal Couvelaire	
2003	Betrayer	The manager	Julien D'Astier	Short
2003	Fruits mûrs	Patrick	Luc Béraud	TV movie
2003	L'île maudite	Bruno	Rémy Burkel	TV movie
2004	Mon fils cet inconnu	Arnaud	Caroline Huppert	TV movie
2004	La fonte des neiges	Marc	Laurent Jaoui	TV movie
2004	La nourrice	Father Morvan	Renaud Bertrand	TV movie
2004	Josephine, Guardian Angel	Denis	Henri Helman	TV series (1 episode)
2004	Sauveur Giordano	Brehal	Pierre Joassin	TV series (1 episode)
2005	Empire of the Wolves	Laurent	Chris Nahon	
2005	L'anniversaire	Jean-Louis	Diane Kurys	
2005	Nuit noire, 17 octobre 1961	Delmas	Alain Tasma	TV movie
2005	S.O.S. 18	Sylvain	Dominique Baron	TV series (1 episode)
2006	Les irréductibles	The banker	Renaud Bertrand	
2006	Passés troubles	Antoine	Serge Meynard	TV movie
2007	Have Mercy on Us All	Maurel	Régis Wargnier	
2007	Scorpion	Patrick	Julien Seri	
2007	Fallen Fighter	Frank	Sophie Ann Rooney	Short
2007	Mort prématurée	Bruno Richet	José Pinheiro	TV movie
2007	Où es-tu ?	Philippe	Miguel Courtois	TV mini-series
2007	Élodie Bradford	Damien Moreno	Olivier Guignard	TV series (1 episode)
2007	Rose et Val	Ferrier	Youri Fisherman	TV series (1 episode)
2007	Alice et Charlie	Weber	Julien Seri	TV series (1 episode)
2007	Greco	Matthias Grecowski	Philippe Setbon	TV series (6 episodes)
2008	Skate or Die	Lucas	Miguel Courtois	
2009	Facteur chance	Rodolphe	Julien Seri	TV movie
2009	Au siècle de Maupassant	Jean Colombel	Gérard Jourd'hui	TV series (1 episode)
2010	Un mari de trop	Alex	Louis Choquette	TV movie
2010	Sable noir	Alex	Julien Seri	TV series (1 episode)
2010–2014	La loi selon Bartoli	François Cappa	François Velle, Charlotte Brändström, ...	TV series (3 episodes)
2011	The Assault	Didier	Julien Leclercq	
2011	La moustache de Charles Bronson	Mehdi	Patrick Fabre	Short
2011	Tout le monde descend	The unemployed	Renaud Bertrand	TV movie
2011	Le vernis craque	Georges	Daniel Janneau	TV series (2 episodes)
2011	Les invincibles	Charles	Pierric Gantelmi d'Ille	TV series (5 episodes)
2012	Les mouvements du bassin	Man in the shower	Hervé Pierre-Gustave	
2012	Rue des roses	Mehdi	Patrick Fabre	Short
2012–2020	Profilage	Thomas Rocher	Alexandre Laurent, Vincent Jamain, ...	TV series (76 episodes)
2013–2014	Nos chers voisins	Arnaud Béranger	Emmanuel Rigaut	TV series (3 episodes)
2014	Piège blanc	Marc Prieur	Abel Ferry	TV movie
2015	J'ai épousé un inconnu	David	Serge Meynard	TV movie
2016	Murders at La Ciotat	Batti Vergniot	Dominique Ladoge	TV movie
2018	Coup de Foudre à Bora-Bora	Marc	David Morlet	TV movie
2022	L'Oubliée d'Amboise	Alban Dutertre	Sylvie Ayme	TV movie
2023	Mr. Blake at Your Service!	Philippe Magnier	Gilles Legardinier	Feature film
2024	Kali	Richard	Julien Seri	Feature film
