= I Origins (soundtrack) =

Soundtrack album by Will Bates and Phil Mossman
- Released: July 15, 2014
- Recorded: 2013–2014
- Genre: Film score
- Length: 53:38
- Label: Milan Records
- Producer: Lucy Alper

Will Bates chronology
The Notorious Mr. Bout (2014)	I Origins (2014)	Mission Blue (2014)

Phil Mossman chronology
The Notorious Mr. Bout (2014)	I Origins (2014)	X/Y (2014)

I Origins (Original Motion Picture Soundtrack) is the soundtrack to the 2014 film I Origins directed by Mike Cahill. The film's musical score is composed by Will Bates and Phil Mossman and produced by Lucy Alper. The soundtrack was released by Milan Records on July 15, 2014.

== Background ==
Bates and Mossman previously worked with Cahill on Another Earth (2011). The score consisted mostly of mid-tempo classical and electronic compositions. The duo experimented on various instruments for the score, as Cahill gave the creative freedom to produce imaginative sounds. He added that the duo had put their immense thought into specific characters and gave separate themes for them.

The album also featured "Dust It Off" by The Dø, "Motion Picture Soundtrack" by Radiohead and "Waltz in G Minor" by pianist Phaedeon Papadopulus. Milan Records released the film's soundtrack on July 15, 2014.

== Reception ==
Todd McCarthy of The Hollywood Reporter described the score as "mood-strengthening". Peter Debruge of Variety also opined it to be moody and over-designed. Chris Bumbray of JoBlo.com wrote "The music by Will Bates is also striking, and it can't be denied that as far as its technical merits go, Cahill never hits a wrong note." Rob Hunter of Film School Rejects attributed the film's score to be one of the core moments amidst the performances and direction. Brandon Ambrosino of Vox felt that "the soundtrack strikes a delicate balance between mellow and driven"; regarding the musical piece "Turning Over Rocks", he said "there's a nice musical shift that very gradually sneaks up on you around 1:40, before it settles in and takes the sound quality in an unexpected but welcome direction."

It has been one of the 114 original scores being shortlisted in contention for the Best Original Score category at the 87th Academy Awards.

== Track listing ==
I Origins (Original Motion Picture Soundtrack) track listing
No.	Title	Artist(s)	Length
1.	"Message to My Future Self"		3:35
2.	"Dust It Off"	The Dø	3:42
3.	"Lucky Elevens"		2:27
4.	"Turning Over Rocks"		3:41
5.	"Driverless Car"		3:55
6.	"Invisible Door"		2:39
7.	"The Test"		3:36
8.	"Karen & Ian"		2:00
9.	"India"		2:11
10.	"Closure"		2:39
11.	"Boise"		3:09
12.	"Discoveries"		4:43
13.	"Salomina"		3:21
14.	"Motion Picture Soundtrack"	Radiohead	3:20
15.	"White Peacock"		3:34
16.	"No Time Like the Present"		2:42
17.	"Waltz in G Minor"	Phaedeon Papadopoulus	2:24
Total length:			53:38
