= Shake Shook Shaken =

Studio album by The Dø
- Released: 29 September 2014
- Recorded: 2013–2014
- Studio: Watchtower (France)
- Genres: Pop; synth-pop; electropop
- Length: 43:11
- Labels: Get Down!; Cinq7; Wagram; Siamese Squids
- Producer: Dan Levy

The Dø chronology
Both Ways Open Jaws (2011)	Shake Shook Shaken (2014)	Spotify Sessions (2015)

Singles from Shake Shook Shaken
- 1. "Keep Your Lips Sealed" Released: 8 October 2014; 2. "Despair, Hangover & Ecstasy" Released: 22 October 2014; 3. "Lick My Wounds" Released: 11 November 2014; 4. "Sparks" Released: 10 December 2014

Shake Shook Shaken is the third studio album by the French-Finnish musical duo the Dø, consisting of vocalist Olivia Merilahti and multi-instrumentalist Dan Levy. Produced by Levy, it was released in France on 29 September 2014 by Get Down!, distributed and licensed by Cinq7 and Wagram Music, and published by the duo's Siamese Squids label.

Merilahti began writing and recording demos in Pro Tools while the group was on tour for their previous album, Both Ways Open Jaws (2011). The album marks a significant change in sound for the duo, largely eschewing acoustic instrumentation in favour of electronics, synthesizers, and audio plug-ins. They purchased a property in Normandy with a water tower and converted it into a recording studio. Once production was complete, they travelled to New York where Levy worked with Fab Dupont to mix the album.

Shake Shook Shaken received generally positive reviews from music critics and won the 2015 Victoires de la Musique Award for Best Rock Album. It peaked at number 7 on SNEP Top Albums and remained on the chart for 50 consecutive weeks, selling 40,000 copies in France by June 2015.

== Background ==
The writing process for the album began while the Dø was touring for their previous album, Both Ways Open Jaws (2011). While Olivia Merilahti regularly wrote lyrics while on the road, she was frustrated by the inability to work on musical compositions. As a result, she began recording demos in the digital audio workstation Pro Tools using a MIDI keyboard. She and Dan Levy also began experimenting with drum machines as they did not have a live drummer for an upcoming tour in the United States.

After finishing the tour in August 2012, the duo began looking for a house in rural Normandy to convert into a recording studio for their third album. They purchased a property from one of their friends that included a brick water tower constructed in the 18th century, then spent five months building a studio in the tower. Construction was completed by early 2013; in the album's liner notes, the recording location is referred to as Watchtower Studio in "Madville, France".

The title Shake Shook Shaken refers to the "little earthquakes" the duo had in their lives in the three years preceding the album's release. Prior to its conception, Merilahti and Levy ended their romantic relationship and Levy experienced a death in the family, both in the same year. Merilahti credited music as "the only branch that [she and Levy] could hold onto" to help them through that year. She took inspiration from the Finnish concept of sisu, which she defined as "the courage to keep going and never to feel sorry for yourself".

== Recording ==
Levy, frustrated with living in Paris and seeking to avoid distractions, moved to Normandy and lived in the water tower for the duration of the recording process. Merilahti continued to reside about two hours away in Paris and record demos in her home studio. Throughout the album's production, she periodically travelled to Normandy, worked with Levy at the studio for several days, then returned to Paris. Though the frequent commuting was "a bit schizophrenic" for Merilahti, she listened to their recently recorded demos while driving and contrasted how the music felt in both rural and urban environments.

"Keep Your Lips Sealed" was one of the earliest songs recorded, which informed the duo's decision to place it at the beginning of the album to establish its tone and sound. The song "Miracles (Back in Time)" was nearly abandoned after working on several iterations that left them dissatisfied. The pair eventually spent "one whole night to solve it" and completed the track.

Shake Shook Shaken was produced and recorded by Levy with assistance from Warren Dongué, a student audio engineer. Recording took roughly one year, after which Merilahti and Levy travelled to New York to work with mixer and engineer Fab Dupont. Levy and Dupont mixed the album at Flux Studio assisted by Mike Latona and Alban Ancel-Pirouelle, with Dupont also mastering the final recordings and providing additional keyboards on "Going Through Walls". The duo credited Dupont for "polishing and providing this clarity that [they] aimed for" with his contributions. Bastien Burger, a frequent touring member for the group, played electric bass on "Anita No!".

== Composition ==
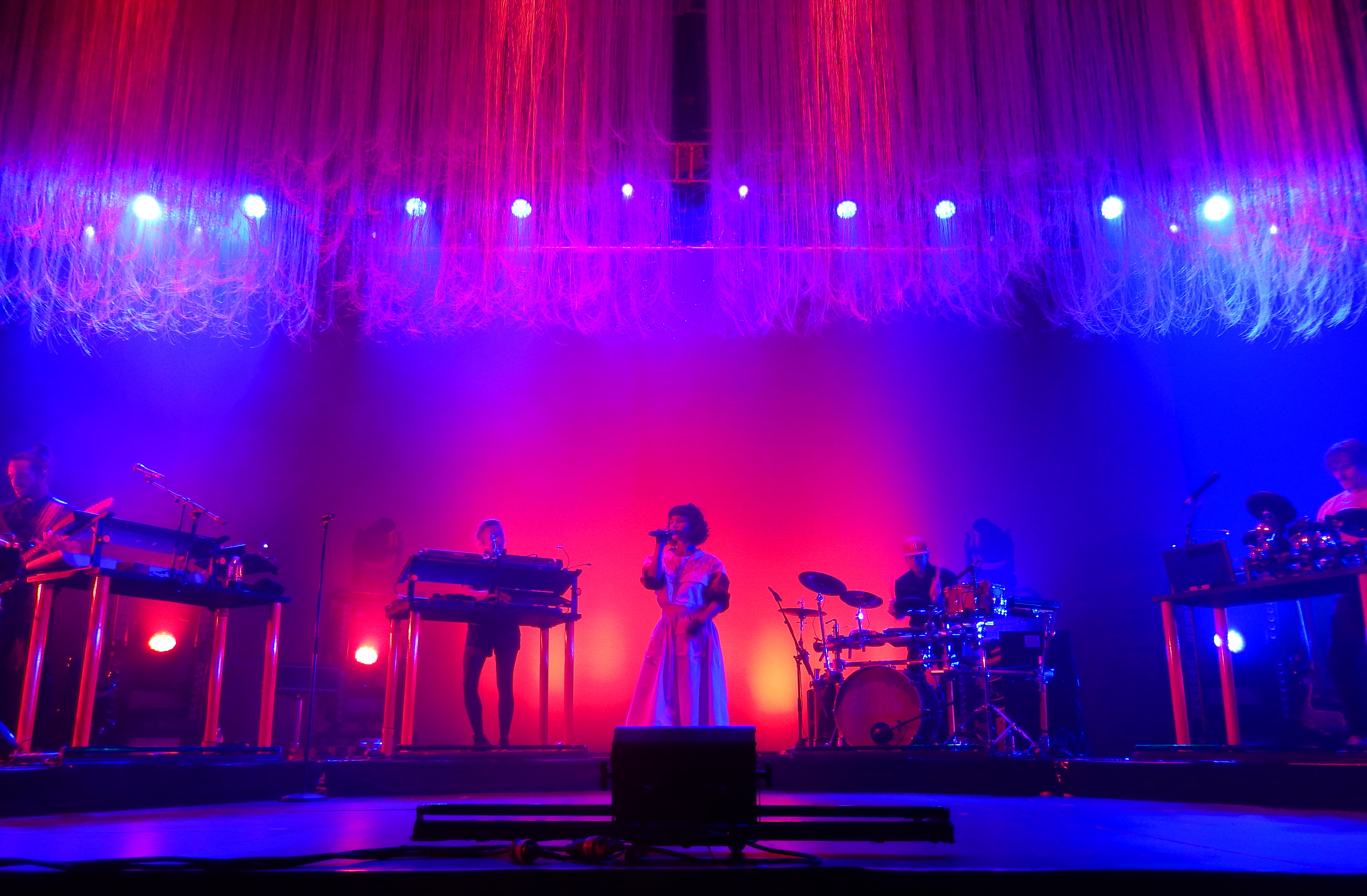
The Dø performing in 2015.

A departure from the "folksy indie-pop" of the Dø's previous albums, Shake Shook Shaken was recorded almost exclusively using electronic instrumentation, with a heavier emphasis on pop music aesthetics and minimalist compositions. Merilahti called this stylistic change "a natural progression", citing the tracks "Dust It Off" and "Slippery Slope" from Both Ways Open Jaws as "direct arrows that point to Shake, Shook, Shaken". At the beginning of recording, the studio only included a MIDI keyboard and a laptop, though they eventually added drum machines and analog synthesizers—such as the Roland Juno-60—to their setup. Much of the music was produced using factory sounds and free audio plug-ins, with Levy estimating that 80% of the album consisted of default sounds available in Pro Tools. Plug-ins from the French software company UVI were also used for instrumentation. Live drums, bass, and guitars are still featured on some tracks, with Vice's Kim Taylor Bennett referring to "Trustful Hands" as "the only song on [the album] with a guitar riff".

Levy did not rely on previous musical trends or nostalgia while developing the album's sound, with the group instead taking inspiration from contemporary musical acts such as Die Antwoord, Kanye West (specifically his album Yeezus), Fuck Buttons, Beyoncé, Death Grips, and Diplo. Merilahti also cited the 1988 anime film Akira as a personal inspiration, along with other anime, manga, and films of the late 1980s.

Merilahti described her lyrics as "more or less surreal poems ...about finding oneself in chaos and knowing how to live with it." She explores themes of the impact of a relationship ending, loss, conflict, redemption, guilt, heroism, and self-censorship. Biblical imagery is also evoked throughout the record, despite neither member of the duo considering themselves religious. To depict the "harmony and unity" between herself and Levy, Merilahti avoided writing from a first person perspective in favour of using the word "we".

The album's genre has been described as pop, synth-pop, and electropop, Various tracks on Shake Shook Shaken have been compared to the works of Broadcast, the Knife, La Roux, Lykke Li, Phoenix, and St. Vincent.

== Release and promotion ==
Shake Shook Shaken was released in France on 29 September 2014 by Get Down!, distributed and licensed by Cinq7 and Wagram Music, and published by the duo's Siamese Squids label. "Keep Your Lips Sealed", the first single from the album, was released in October 2014. Later that month, the group released a music video for the second single, "Despair, Hangover & Ecstasy", alongside an announcement that Shake Shook Shaken would be released in the United States on 26 January 2015. The third single, "Lick My Wounds", was released in November 2014, followed by the fourth and final single "Sparks" in December 2014. On 6 February 2015, Entertainment Weekly published a "full album stream" for U.S. listeners. The album was officially released in the U.S. on 10 February by Six Degrees Records and Siamese Squids.

In July 2014, the Dø posted a teaser trailer for an accompanying short film titled Miracles, which was then set to be released in early September 2014 ahead of the album. The full 12-minute short film, a collaboration with director Reynald Gresset and production company Iconoclast, was eventually published by Pitchfork in October 2015. The film's story, written by Gresset, follows the relationship of two children over several years and features seven songs from the album.

On 20 December 2017, the duo released Live at l'Olympia, Paris, a live album recorded at their 2017 performance at L'Olympia. The album includes all but two tracks from Shake Shook Shaken, along with "Aha" and "The Bridge is Broken" from their 2008 album A Mouthful and a cover of Cole Porter's "I Love Paris" featuring Jeanne Added.

== Critical reception ==
Professional ratings
Aggregate scores
Source	Rating
AnyDecentMusic?	6.7/10
Metacritic	71/100
Review scores
Source	Rating
The 405	7.5/10
AllMusic	4/5 stars
Consequence of Sound	C+
The Irish Times	3/5 stars
The Line of Best Fit	7/10
MusicOMH	3.5/5 stars
The Observer	4/5 stars
Uncut	8/10
Under the Radar	5/10 stars

Shake Shook Shaken received generally positive reviews from music critics. At Metacritic, which assigns a normalised rating out of 100 to reviews from mainstream critics, the album received an average score of 71, based on 11 reviews.

AllMusic's Heather Phares called the album "the Dø's finest work yet", commending its "addictively weird and catchy" sound and Merilahti's lyricism. Reviewing the album for Uncut, Fiona Sturges called Shake Shook Shaken "a pop record at heart", citing its melodies, Merilahti's vocals, and the "intriguing change in sound" as strengths. Andrew Darley of The 405 complimented the "infectious confidence" and praised the duo for balancing the thematic focus on conflict without "consuming or weigh[ing] down the music". He singled out "Sparks" as "[a] pinnacle of the album".

The Observer's Michael Cragg praised the "refinement of their sound" and the improved choruses compared to the duo's previous work. He also dubbed "Sparks" a "glorious" track and "Trustful Hands" a "highlight". Laurence Day of The Line of Best Fit admired the duo's change in sound and their "colossal bravery in cannonballing directly into an area they're unfamiliar with". While he found the album to be "a tad haphazard", Day praised the project overall for its "calculated pandemonium"and expressed excitement for future releases. John Murphy of MusicOMH echoed Cragg, complimenting several tracks for their choruses and instrumentals and calling it "[the Dø's] strongest album to date".

Janine Schaults of Consequence of Sound had mixed feelings about the implementation of electronics. Schaults enjoyed the "tech-friendly approach" used on "Despair, Hangover & Ecstasy" and "Sparks", but criticized Levy's production on "Opposite Ways" for tonally conflicting with Merilahti's vocals and lyrics. She highlighted "Trustful Hands" for "melding the duo's earthy past with its streamlined present", ultimately concluding that the album was inconsistent. In The Irish Times, Jim Carroll wrote that the Dø's shift to electronic instrumentation "removed some of the warmth" present in their prior releases, though he also praised "Trustful Hands" and Merilahti's vocals. Under the Radar's Scott Dransfield was more critical, calling it "too one-note and even grating at times". While he complimented Merilahti's "powerful and beguiling" vocals and enjoyed some tracks, Dransfield found the bulk of the album to have a "bland, overdone sound".

At the 2015 Victoires de la Musique, Shake Shook Shaken won Rock Album of the Year.

== Commercial performance ==
Shake Shook Shaken debuted at number 7 on the SNEP Top Albums chart for the week ending 11 October 2014. It remained in the top 40 for two additional weeks, followed by a period of fluctuating increases and decreases in its placement. The album had sold 16,000 copies in France by December 2014.

After 28 weeks on the SNEP Top Albums chart, Shake Shook Shaken reached its fifth-highest position at number 54 in April 2015. Shake Shook Shaken remained on the Top Albums chart for a total of 50 consecutive weeks, making its final appearance at number 178 the week ending 19 September 2015. By June 2015, 40,000 copies had been sold in France.

== Track listing ==
All lyrics are written by Olivia Merilahti; all music is composed and arranged by The Dø (Olivia Merilahti and Dan Levy).

Shake Shook Shaken track listing
No.	Title	Length
1.	"Keep Your Lips Sealed"	3:24
2.	"Trustful Hands"	4:07
3.	"Miracles (Back in Time)"	4:30
4.	"Sparks"	3:47
5.	"Going Through Walls"	2:52
6.	"Despair, Hangover & Ecstasy"	2:53
7.	"Anita No!"	3:02
8.	"A Mess Like This"	4:23
9.	"Lick My Wounds"	3:19
10.	"Opposite Ways"	4:12
11.	"Nature Will Remain"	3:39
12.	"Omen"	2:55
Total length:		43:11

Deluxe Edition B-Sides
No.	Title	Length
13.	"Poppies"	3:33
14.	"The Watchtower"	3:18
15.	"Only Takes a Night"	2:49
Total length:		52:30

=== Notes ===
- "Poppies", "The Watchtower", and "Only Takes a Night" are subtitled "(Unreleased B-side)".
- On vinyl releases, "Despair, Hangover & Ecstasy" is the third track on the album. The rest of the track listing is otherwise unaltered.

== Personnel ==
Credits are adapted from the album's liner notes.

=== The Dø ===
- Olivia Merilahti – vocals
- Dan Levy – production, recording, mixing

=== Additional contributors ===
- Warren Dongué – production assistance, recording assistance
- Fab Dupont – mixing, mastering, additional keyboards on "Going Through Walls"
- Mike Latona – mixing assistance
- Alban Ancel-Pioruelle – mixing assistance
- Vincent Chevalot – audio consultation
- Bastien Burger – additional electric bass on "Anita No!"
- Alice Moitié – band photos
- Clarice Plastein – sky photos
- Philippe Lebruman – artwork

== Charts ==
=== Weekly charts ===
Chart (2014–2015)	Peak position
Belgian Albums (Ultratop Flanders)	169
Belgian Albums (Ultratop Wallonia)	24
French Albums (SNEP)	7
Swiss Albums (Schweizer Hitparade)	29

=== Year-end charts ===
Chart (2015)	Position
French Albums (SNEP)	38

== Release history ==
Release dates and formats for Shake Shook Shaken
Region	Date	Format(s)	Label	Ref.
France	29 September 2014	CD, digital download, LP, streaming	Get Down!, Cinq7, Wagram, Siamese Squids	
Australia	10 October 2014	CD, digital download, streaming	Cartell	
United Kingdom	9 February 2015	CD, digital download, streaming	Wagram	
United States	10 February 2015 (Note: While the album was not officially released in the U.S. until 10 February 2015, Entertainment Weekly published a "full album stream" on 6 February.)	CD, digital download, streaming	Six Degrees, Siamese Squids	
