= Mr. Blake at Your Service! =

2023 film by Gilles Legardinier

- Theatrical release poster
- French: Complètement cramé !
- Directed by: Gilles Legardinier
- Written by: Christel Henon; Gilles Legardinier
- Based on: Complètement cramé! by Gilles Legardinier
- Produced by: Christel Henon; Lilian Eche
- Starring: Fanny Ardant; John Malkovich; Émilie Dequenne; Philippe Bas; Eugénie Anselin; Al Ginter; Anne Brionne; Christel Henon
- Cinematography: Stéphane Le Parc
- Edited by: Yves Deschamps
- Music by: Erwann Chandon
- Production companies: Bidibul Productions; Superprod Drama; France TV Distribution; Film Fund Luxembourg; CNC Films
- Distributed by: Universal Pictures International France
- Release dates: 17 October 2023 (Newport Beach); 1 November 2023 (France)
- Running time: 110 minutes
- Countries: France; Luxembourg
- Languages: English; French
- Box office: $2.8 million

Mr. Blake at Your Service! (French: Complètement cramé !, lit. 'Completely Burnt Out!'), also titled Well Done! and At Your Service, Madam, is a 2023 comedy-drama film directed by Gilles Legardinier and starring Fanny Ardant, John Malkovich, Émilie Dequenne, Philippe Bas, Eugénie Anselin, Al Ginter, Anne Brionne and Christel Henon. It is based on Legardinier's 2012 novel Complètement cramé !. It is also Legardinier's feature directorial debut.

== Premise ==
Mr. Andrew Blake, a recently widowed British businessman, takes a job as a butler in a manor house in northern France, in a bid to get closer to the memory of his late French wife. His life takes an unexpected turn as he navigates the eccentric behaviour of Nathalie and the other household staff.

== Cast ==
- Fanny Ardant as Nathalie
- John Malkovich as Mr. Andrew Blake
- Émilie Dequenne as Odile
- Philippe Bas as Philippe Magnier
- Eugénie Anselin as Manon
- Al Ginter as Richard Ward
- Anne Brionne as Melissa Ward
- Christel Henon as Mme Berliner

== Production ==
Production was scheduled to begin in February 2022.

Filming occurred in Brittany, Château du Bois-Cornillé, Vitré, Ille-et-Vilaine and London. As of May 2022, the film was in post-production.

== Release ==
Mr. Blake at Your Service! had its US premiere at the Newport Beach Film Festival on 17 October 2023. The film was released theatrically in France on 1 November 2023. It also screened at the 15th French Film Festival in Poland on 7 June 2024, under the title At Your Service, Madam.

=== Box office ===
Mr. Blake at Your Service! grossed $2.8 million in France, Spain, Hungary, Czech Republic, Slovakia, Bulgaria, Lithuania, Poland, Portugal, Australia and New Zealand.

=== Reception ===
The film has a 80% rating on Rotten Tomatoes based on six reviews.
