= Kiss of the Dragon =

2001 action thriller film by Chris Nahon

- American theatrical release poster
- Directed by: Chris Nahon
- Screenplay by: Luc Besson; Robert Mark Kamen
- Story by: Jet Li
- Produced by: Luc Besson; Jet Li; Steve Chasman; Happy Walters
- Starring: Jet Li; Bridget Fonda; Tchéky Karyo
- Cinematography: Thierry Arbogast
- Edited by: Marco Cave
- Music by: Craig Armstrong
- Production companies: StudioCanal; EuropaCorp
- Distributed by: EuropaCorp Distribution
- Release dates: 6 July 2001 (United States); 1 August 2001 (France)
- Running time: 98 minutes
- Country: France
- Languages: English; French; Mandarin
- Budget: $25 million
- Box office: $64.4 million

Kiss of the Dragon (French: Le Baiser mortel du dragon) is a 2001 English-language French action film directed by Chris Nahon, written and produced by French filmmaker Luc Besson and starring an international cast led by Jet Li, Bridget Fonda, and Tchéky Karyo. It follows a Chinese police officer who is sent to Paris to assist in the arrest of a Chinese mob boss. Framed for murder and hard pressed to prove his innocence, he teams up with a woman who has been forced into prostitution.

Li wanted to take a realistic approach to the fight scenes and forgo the CGI and wire work that had been popularized by films such as Charlie's Angels and The Matrix. Consequently, most of the action sequences did not use CGI or wire work; only two scenes required CGI enhancement, and only one scene involved wire work.

== Plot ==
Liu Jian, a Chinese police officer, is sent to Paris to help the French authorities apprehend Chinese mob boss Mr. Big, who is involved in heroin smuggling. He meets Inspector Jean-Pierre Richard, a corrupt and violent police detective, at a hotel. Richard tricks Liu into believing he is simply providing reconnaissance of a meet involving Mr. Big. During the operation, Mr. Big is introduced to two female prostitutes, one being Jessica Kamen, an American woman, both of whom he takes up to his room for sex. While the French investigators and Liu are watching through multiple surveillance cameras, Mr. Big kicks everyone out except for the two women. As her colleague starts to pleasure Mr Big, Jessica nervously retires to the bathroom where she vomits in the toilet. The other prostitute then goes on to stab Mr. Big repeatedly. Liu rushes from the makeshift surveillance room to the scene, subdues the prostitute, and uses an acupuncture needle to put Mr Big in a coma. As he attempts to phone for an ambulance, Richard enters and shoots Mr. Big and the woman with Liu's police-issued handgun, framing Liu for both murders. Jessica has remained in the bathroom during the entire incident.

Realizing he has been set up, Liu manages to escape from the hotel with a surveillance tape showing Richard shooting Mr. Big. In the aftermath of the failed operation, a high-level Chinese delegation arrives in Paris to liaise with their ministerial counterparts. Richard presents evidence making Liu the primary suspect, but the Chinese officials secretly distrust him. Liu meets with one of them on a crowded sightseeing boat and passes him the tape, revealing the truth. However, Richard's men spot them, and the liaison is assassinated. Liu is then forced to flee from a horde of cops and GIGN commandos. After Liu escapes, he is forced to maintain a low profile.

While his situation worsens, he meets Jessica, whose daughter was kidnapped by Richard to force her into prostitution. Liu discovers that Jessica was the second prostitute at the hotel during the night of Mr. Big's murder. He realizes she can prove his innocence, but she refuses to go along without retrieving her daughter, Isabel. Liu decides the tape would provide the best evidence and sends Jessica to Richard's office to steal the tape. Jessica manages to get the tape, then Liu and Jessica head to an orphanage where Isabel is kept. However, Richard anticipates this move and has the duo ambushed by his thugs at the orphanage. During their escape, Jessica is shot in the chest. Liu manages to get her to the hospital in time and leaves for the police station, fiercely determined to retrieve her daughter.

Liu storms into the police station where Richard is holding Isabel hostage on one of the upper floors. He has to fight his way through several groups of policemen, including more than twenty officers attending a martial arts class. As a contingent of baton-wielding riot police pour into the ground floor, Liu sabotages the controls of a steel fire door to block access to the upper floor. Having defeated Richard's personal henchmen, Liu enters his office and finds him holding Isabel at gunpoint. Even though Liu is unarmed, he tells Richard that if he kills Isabel, then he will have all the time he needs to kill him. Richard tries to kill Liu, but he only manages to shoot him in the shoulder. However, the bullet injury fails to prevent Liu from disarming Richard while sticking an acupuncture needle into the back of his neck, in a forbidden location known as the "kiss of the dragon," which stimulates all the body's blood to travel to the brain to cause a painful death by brain aneurysm. Richard suffers and dies from the "kiss of the dragon" just as Liu departs with Isabel. Returning to Jessica's hospital bedside, Liu removes an acupuncture needle from Jessica's neck, promptly waking her. Upon waking up, she happily finds Isabel peacefully sleeping by her side.

== Cast ==
- Jet Li as Inspector "Johnny" Liu Jian
- Bridget Fonda as Jessica Kamen
- Tchéky Karyo as Inspector Jean-Pierre Richard
- Ric Young as "Mr. Big" Sung
- Burt Kwouk as Uncle Tai
- Max Ryan as Lupo
- Kentaro as Chen
- Laurence Ashley as Aja
- Cyril Raffaelli as Twin
- Didier Azoulay as Twin
- John Forgeham as Inspector Max
- Paul Barrett as Pilot
- Colin Prince as Lupo's Assistant
- Vincent Glo as "Pluto"
- Vincent Wong as Minister Tang
- Isabelle Duhauvelle as Isabel Kamen
- Affif Ben Badra as Lupo's Henchman (uncredited)

== Production ==
In June 2000, it was reported that Luc Besson would write, produce and finance a film for star Jet Li described as a mixture of Léon: The Professional and Fist of Legend. Corey Yuen was announced to serve as action director. The film came about from a meeting held between Besson and Li, wherein Li pitched the story which lead to Besson developing a script. Besson provided the entirety of the film's budget himself with the intention of selling off international distribution rights to foreign territories. In September of that year, it was announced Bridget Fonda and Tchéky Karyo had signed on to star in the film. 20th Century Fox was announced to be in negotiations for the North American distribution rights. Besson hired Chris Nahon to direct the film in his feature debut after previously working in French TV commercials and music videos.

The director filmed most of the action sequences without CGI or wire work; only two scenes required CGI enhancement and only one scene involved wire work. Wire work was added to one of the last fight sequences between Li and Cyril Raffaelli, in order to add clarity to Raffaelli's kicks, as he was moving too fast for the camera. Nahon had to slow down this fight scene, as both Li and Raffaelli were moving too quickly to be captured clearly at normal recording speed.

When Tcheky Karyo's character shoots one of his henchmen, a fountain of blood is shown erupting from the back of the man's head in the French version of the film. This blood eruption was cropped from most international versions of the movie.

== Reception ==
The film received mixed reviews from critics, who thought violence overwhelmed it at the expense of the story and even a true portrayal of martial arts. On Rotten Tomatoes the film has an approval rating of 53% based on reviews from 108 critics. The site's consensus states "A formulaic actioner that's sure to please action fans. Those looking for plot, believability, or character development will have difficulty finding them." On Metacritic it has a score of 58 out of 100, based on 26 critic reviews, indicating "mixed or average" reviews. Audiences surveyed by CinemaScore gave the film a grade B+ on scale of A to F.

Writing in the Asian Journal of Communication in 2013, academic Zheng Zhu listed the film alongside Dragon: The Bruce Lee Story (1993) and The Tuxedo (2002) as films that broke from the Western tradition of portraying Asian men as asexual, stating that while they are often featured as heroes in martial arts films, they are rarely portrayed as romantic or loving. Noting the films each show an Asian martial artist with a white female partner, Zhu states they reverse the conventional portrayal of a "dominant white knight and a submissive Oriental lady". However, he makes critiques of the portrayal of these relationships. For example, each film shows "white women play[ing] the most important role" in helping Chinese men accomplish success. Asian men, Zhu argues, are portrayed as incapable of achieving success in Western society unless they are supported by white femininity.

Roger Ebert of the Chicago Sun-Times gave the film 3 out of 4 stars, and wrote: "I like the movie on a simple physical level. There is no deeper meaning and no higher skill involved; just professional action, well-staged and filmed with a certain stylistic elegance." The film is based on a story by Li, and is one of Fonda's final on-screen appearances before her retirement from acting.

Due to its violence, Kiss of the Dragon was banned in China. Li spoke out about this censorship.

== Box office ==
Kiss of the Dragon opened at 2,025 North American theaters on July 6, 2001, to an opening weekend gross of $13,304,027 ($6,569 per screen). It went on to a total North American gross of $36,845,124, making the film to be very profitable for 20th Century Fox (which only paid slightly more than $12.5 million to acquire the distribution rights in North America and some other foreign territories).

Its total worldwide box office gross is $64,437,847.

The film was set to be the first film in the United States to receive an R-rating to be available on Disney+ on April 29, 2022, but eventually the decision was dropped, and the film will instead be streaming in Canada only.

== Soundtrack ==
Kiss of the Dragon

Soundtrack album by Various artists
- Released: July 3, 2001
- Recorded: 2000–2001
- Genre: Hip hop, electronic
- Label: Virgin
- Producer: Bink, The Neptunes, Daft Punk, Slum Village, DJ Clue, DJ Ev, Nick Wiz, Larry "Rock" Campbell

Singles from Kiss of the Dragon
- 1. "Lapdance" Released: May 21, 2001; 2. "Ghir Dini" Released: 2001; 3. "F**k That" Released: 2001; 4. "Adore You" Released: 2001; 5. "What You Got?" Released: 2001

Professional ratings
Review scores
Source	Rating
Allmusic	1.5/5 stars

The soundtrack was released on July 3, 2001, through Virgin Records, and consisted mainly of a blend of hip hop and electronic music.

1. "Mystikal Fever" – 3:49 (Mystikal)
2. "Lapdance" – 3:33 (N.E.R.D)
3. "Aerodynamic" – 3:35 (Daft Punk and Slum Village)
4. "Fuck That" – 3:17 (Bathgate)
5. "What You Got?" – 4:19 (Chino XL)
6. "Sing" – 4:41 (Mouse)
7. "Cheatin'" – 3:46 (Liberty City)
8. "Don't Blame It on I" – 4:05 (The Congos)
9. "Ghir Dini" – 3:59 (Assia)
10. "As If You Said Nothing" – 4:38 (Craig Armstrong)
11. "Adore You" – 4:21 (Lisa Barbuscia)
