= A Mouthful =

Studio album by The Dø
- Released: 14 January 2008
- Recorded: 2007
- Genres: Indie rock, folk rock
- Length: 42:34
- Labels: Cinq7; Wagram; Get Døwn!
- Producer: The Dø

The Dø chronology
A Mouthful (2008)	Both Ways Open Jaws (2011)

A Mouthful is the debut album by French/Finnish indie rock band The Dø, released on 14 January 2008. It spawned two singles: "On My Shoulders" (2007) and "At Last!" (2008). The album was given a US release in April 2010, featuring additional versions of three of the album's songs as bonus tracks.

== Track listing ==
All songs written by Olivia Bouyssou Merilahti and Dan Levy.

1. "Playground Hustle" – 2:55
2. "At Last!" – 4:09
3. "On My Shoulders" – 5:21
4. "Song for Lovers" – 2:24
5. "The Bridge Is Broken" – 4:42
6. "Stay (Just a Little Bit More)" – 3:06
7. "Unissasi laulelet" – 2:19
8. "Tammie" – 3:15
9. "Queen Dot Kong" – 3:14
10. "Coda" – 1:57
11. "Searching Gold" – 5:10
12. "When Was I Last Home?" – 3:34
13. "Travel Light" – 4:02
14. "Aha" – 4:19
15. "In My Box" – 1:48

=== Bonus tracks on the US release ===
16. "On My Shoulders" (chamber version) – 5:35
17. "Unissasi laulelet" (chamber version) – 3:55
18. "Playground Hustle'N'Bustle" – 11:19

== Critical reception ==
Professional ratings
Review scores
Source	Rating
AllMusic	3.5/5 stars
Drowned in Sound	(9/10)
Les Inrockuptibles	(Favorable)
Pitchfork Media	(7.5/10)

Pitchfork Media gave the album a rating of 7.5 out of 10, noting "[A Mouthful] tries to balance the mature and the immature" and that "[Olivia B. Merilahti and Dan Levy] aren't shy about toying with musical categories (...) which compensates for the less-than-advisable inclusions, and the record is as ambitious and fun as any coming-out party in recent memory", but criticizing the lack of a better quality control.

Drowned in Sound gave it a rating of 9 out of 10, saying the band is like "a female Eminem backed with a brass band" or "PJ Harvey on the Moon".

French magazine Les Inrockuptibles gave a positive review, calling them a "cool and promising band".

The album was nominated for the Prix Constantin in 2008 but did not win.

== Charts ==
A Mouthful topped the French charts in its first week. It is the first English-sung pop French record to top the albums chart in France.

Chart (2008)	Peak position
Belgian Albums (Ultratop Wallonia)	49
Finnish Albums (Suomen virallinen lista)	39
French Albums (SNEP)	1
Swiss Albums (Schweizer Hitparade)	52

=== Sales ===
Region	Certification	Certified units/sales
France	—	150,000

It was awarded a gold certification from the Independent Music Companies Association which indicated sales of at least 100,000 copies throughout Europe.
