= The Dø =

Finnish-French indie pop band

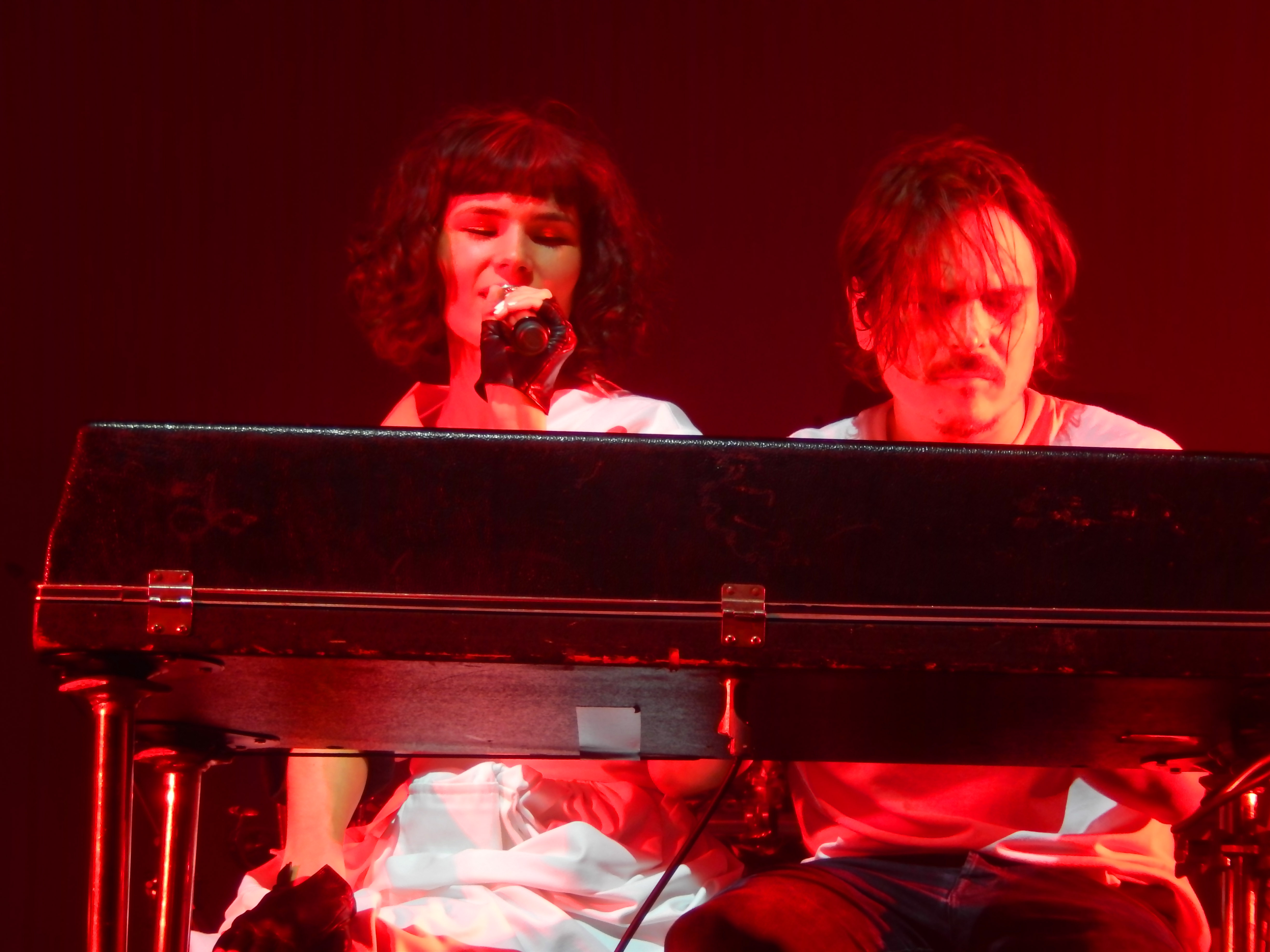
- Olivia Merilahti (left) and Dan Levy (right) in 2015

Background information
- Origin: Paris, France
- Genres: Folk rock, indie rock
- Years active: 2005–2020
- Labels: Siamese Squids; Get Down!; Cinq7; Six Degrees; Ministry of Sound; Rockhopper; Border; Shock; Bang
- Members: Dan Levy; Olivia Merilahti
- Website: thedomusic.com

The Dø (/ðə doʊ/) was a Finnish-French indie pop band founded in Paris in 2005. The band is composed of Olivia Merilahti (singer and musician) and Dan Levy (multi-instrumentalist). The duo has been backed on stage by three different drummers: Jérémie Pontier (2007–2008), José Joyette (2008–2009), and Pierre Belleville (since 2009). Their first studio album A Mouthful topped the French charts in 2008, making them the first French act singing in English to reach that position.

== Biography ==
=== Formation and early career (2005–2007) ===
Olivia Merilahti and Dan Levy met in 2005 while recording the music for the French film Empire of the Wolves directed by Chris Nahon and produced by Gaumont.

They released their first piece under the name "The Dø" a few months later in the form of a three-track EP. The band's name is derived from the first note of the solfège scale, and is pronounced as the English word "dough", with a long "o" sound. It is written with the letter Ø (slashed o), and the "D" often in lower-case to resemble a half note. The EP included the track "The Bridge Is Broken", composed for a contemporary dance ballet titled Scène d'amour by Finnish choreographer Juha-Pekka Marsalo. They continued their work on films, including The Passenger (awarded at the Festival d'Angers and the Festival d'Aubagne), Wild Camp and Darling. They scored the dance works Prologue, Perle and Cinderella by Juha-Pekka Marsalo, as well as poetry lectures by Carolyn Carlson) and the stage play Laure by Colette Peignot.

In their free time, they wrote the songs which would feature on their first album, A Mouthful. The band's Myspace page was opened in 2007. The first four songs ("The Bridge is Broken", "At Last", "On My Shoulders" and "Playground Hustle") were released online. These quickly created a buzz that brought them to play a series of sold-out concerts in Paris. In December 2007, they opened the festival Les Transmusicales de Rennes.

Meanwhile, they signed on the indie label Cinq/7, and the song "On My Shoulders" was their first single, also used in an Oxford-notepads commercial.

=== A Mouthful (2008–2010) ===
A Mouthful was released in France in January 2008. It was released in the rest of Europe and Australia later that year. It was very well received by critics and the public, ranking No. 1 on the French albums chart in the first week. It was acclaimed as an eclectic record, drawing inspiration from various genres as pop, folk, rock and hip hop, while maintaining integrity and an original approach.

The first single from the album was "On My Shoulders", followed by "At Last" and "Stay (Just a Little Bit More)". The music video for "At Last" was directed by Belgian choreographer Wim Vandekeybus.

The band went on tour in Europe and Australia for over 200 shows. They spent the summer of 2008 playing at most of the biggest festivals in Europe (Eurockéennes de Belfort, Paleo, Provinssirock, Vieilles Charrues, Roskilde, Main Square Festival, Pukkelpop...), flew to Australia for the V Festival in the spring of 2009, and spent two weeks in America, playing from Mexico to Canada, New York City to Los Angeles, in September 2009.

In 2009, the Dø won an EBBA Award. Every year the European Border Breakers Awards (EBBA) recognize the success of ten emerging artists or groups who reached audiences outside their own countries with their first internationally released album in the past year.

A Mouthful was officially released in the US in April 2010 on Six Degrees Records, including three bonus tracks.

=== Both Ways Open Jaws (2011) ===
In December 2010, the band released a video for the first promotional single "Dust It Off". Their second album entitled Both Ways Open Jaws was released in some parts of Europe on Monday, 7 March 2011, and in France on Wednesday, 9 March 2011. Beginning late October and ending in mid-November, the album was released worldwide.

=== Shake Shook Shaken (2014–2015) ===
On 14 May the band shared the track "Keep Your Lips Sealed". This was followed up in July with the announcement of the band's third album Shake Shook Shaken, released on 29 September in France, Benelux, Switzerland and Andorra. A few days after this announcement the duo also shared a second track from the album, "Miracles (Back in Time)". 18 August saw the release of the third single from the album "Despair, Hangover & Ecstasy", which was followed up with a music video on 21 October premiered online by The Fader. The album was then made available in the rest of the world in late 2014/early 2015.

Shake Shook Shaken went to No. 7 on the overall French chart in its week of release, charting at No. 1 in the digital chart. It also received a nomination for IMPALA's European Independent Album of the Year Award.

The album was awarded Rock Album of the Year at the Victoires de la Musique in February 2015.

=== Solo projects ===
On 9 March, 2020, the duo announced through the Dø's social media that they both have been working on personal projects. Olivia was releasing new material due on 28 May 2021 with her solo project "Prudence" and Dan was working with the band S+C+A+R+R.

On September 29, 2024, Olivia posted the following message on Prudence's Facebook page, announcing the band's official breakup:

'Shake Shook Shaken', third and final album by The Dø, is turning 10 today. Unfortunately, the differences within the group make it impossible to celebrate this anniversary in style. The collaboration between Dan Levy and myself is officially over, it has been the case for years now, but has never been made public before. I wanted to clarify this matter so as not to disappoint anyone who are expecting something new from the band. The music of The Dø lives on thanks to you, with you, and I'm deeply grateful about that.

— Olivia Meriahti

== Discography ==
=== Albums ===
==== Studio albums ====
Year	Album	Peak chart positions					Sales
Year	Album	FRA	BEL (Fl)	BEL (Wa)	FIN	SWI	Sales
2008	A Mouthful	1	—	49	39	52	FRA: 150,000
2011	Both Ways Open Jaws	14	—	55	—	34	FRA: 45,000
2014	Shake Shook Shaken	7	169	24	—	29	FRA: 40,000

==== Live albums ====
Year	Album
2012	Both Ways Open Jaws Extended
2017	Live at l'Olympia, Paris

==== Soundtracks ====
- 2005: Empire of the Wolves soundtrack

=== EPs ===
- 2010: Dust It Off

=== Singles ===
Year	Single	Peak chart positions	Album
Year	Single	FRA	Album
2007	"On My Shoulders"	—	A Mouthful
2008	"At Last!"	—	A Mouthful
2011	"Too Insistent"	83	Both Ways Open Jaws
2011	"Dust It Off"	—	Both Ways Open Jaws
2014	"Keep Your Lips Sealed"	66	Shake Shook Shaken
2014	"Despair, Hangover & Ecstasy"	58	Shake Shook Shaken
2014	"Trustful Hands"	88	Shake Shook Shaken
2014	"Anita No!"	70	Shake Shook Shaken
2014	"Miracles (Back in Time)"	176	Shake Shook Shaken
2014	"On My Shoulders" (re-release)	160	A Mouthful
2015	"Sparks"	120	Shake Shook Shaken

== Awards and nominations ==
Year	Award	Result
2009	EBBA Awards	Won
2015	Rock Album of the Year at the Victoires de la Musique	Won
