= Skate or Die (film) =

- Directed by: Miguel Courtois
- Written by: Chris Nahon; Clelhio Favretto
- Produced by: Sebastien Fechner; Nicolas Vannier
- Starring: Mickey Mahut; Idriss Diop; Elsa Pataky; Rachida Brakni; Philippe Bas; Passi
- Distributed by: Pathé
- Release date: 11 June 2008
- Running time: 92 minutes
- Country: France
- Language: French
- Budget: $6.8 million
- Box office: $1.9 million

Skate or Die is a French action film directed by Miguel Courtois released in 2008.

== Plot summary ==
Mickey and Idriss are two skaters who witness, and film on their cell phone, the killing of three people in a parking lot. Unfortunately for them, the killers notice them and pursue them through the streets of Paris. By taking refuge in a police station, the two young men understand that their pursuers are actually corrupt inspectors.

== Cast ==
- Mickey Mahut - Mickey
- Idriss Diop - Idriss
- Elsa Pataky - Dany
- Philippe Bas - Lucas
- Passi - Sylla
- Rachida Brakni - Sylvie
- Bernard Le Coq - Carpentier
- Vincent Desagnat - Police officer
