= Profilage =

- Genre: Police procedural Psychological Thriller; Drama
- Created by: Fanny Robert
- Starring: Juliette Roudet (seasons 4, 5, 6 [recurring] seasons 7-9 [main]); Philippe Bas (actor) (seasons 3-10); Raphaël Ferret; Sophie de Fürst (seasons 6-8 [main] season 9 [guest]); Jean-Michel Martial; Odile Vuillemin (seasons 1-6 [main] season 7 [guest]); Diane Dassigny (seasons 7-10); Vanessa Valence (seasons 1-5); Valérie Dashwood (seasons 3-10); Guillaume Cramoisan (seasons 1-2)
- Music by: Alexandre Fortuit
- Country of origin: France
- No. of seasons: 10
- No. of episodes: 102 (list of episodes)

Production
- Producer: Stéphane Marsil
- Running time: about 50-55 minutes (about 1 hour)

Original release
- Release: April 23, 2009 – August 27, 2020

Profilage is a French television series created by Fanny Robert and Sophie Lebarbier and broadcast since April 23, 2009, on TF1 in France. In Belgium, the series has been broadcast on RTBF since May 25, 2013. In the United States, the series is broadcast on PBS, where the name of the series (in English, "Profiling") is renamed "The Paris Murders", and "Profilage" Season 4 is designated as "The Paris Murders" Season 1.

== Background ==
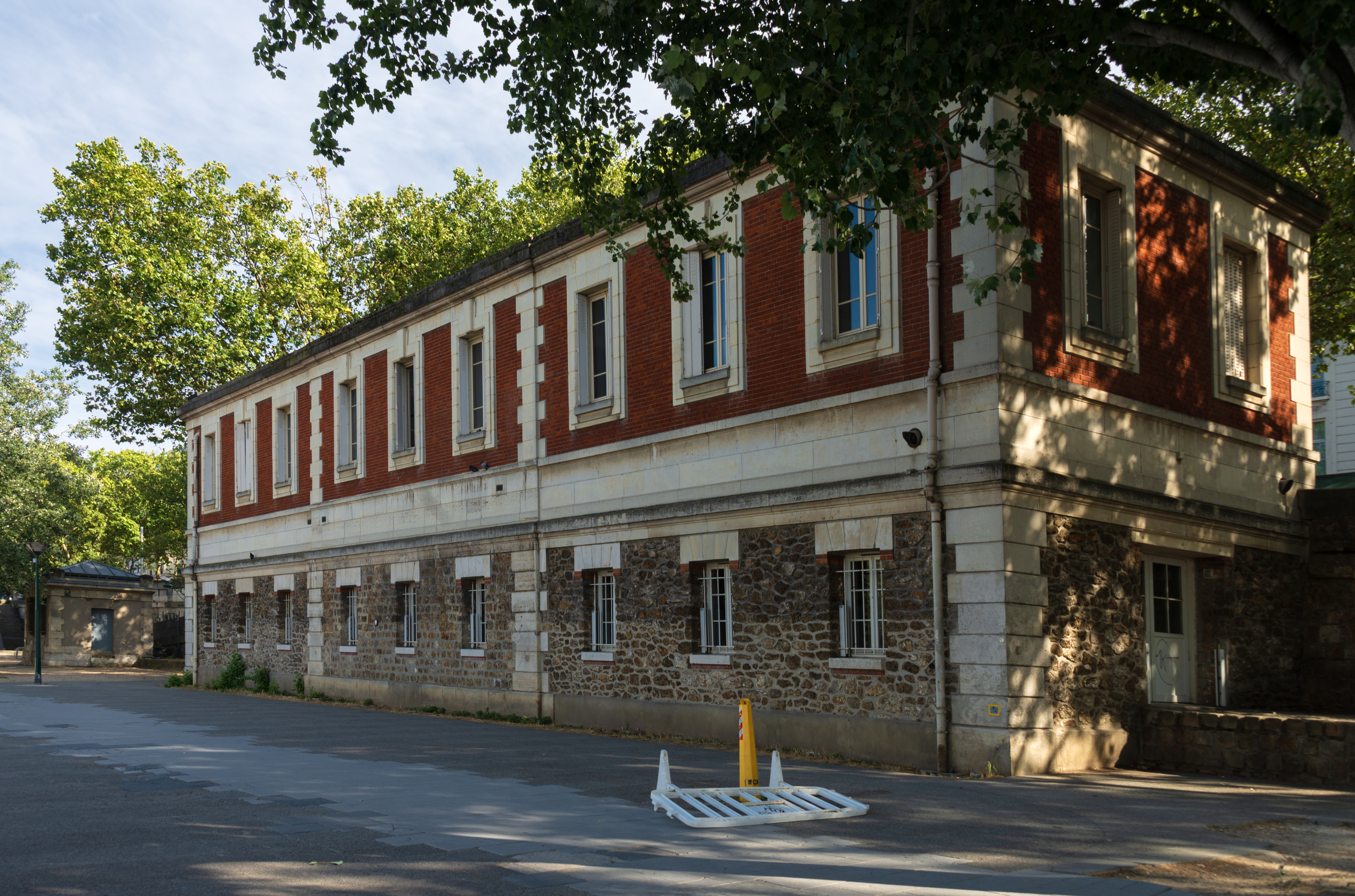
Former Inspection générale de la navigation building on Seine in Paris, used as Police Station No. 3 in the series

The series relates the investigations of Chloé Saint-Laurent then Adèle Delettre, two psychologists specialized in criminology. Their exceptional experience and sensitivity allow them to decipher the state of mind of murderers as victims, thus enabling investigators from the 3rd Division of the Judicial Police (DPJ) in Paris to solve the most disturbing cases.

== Cast ==
Main cast
Actor/actress	Character	Seasons								
Actor/actress	Character	1	2	3	4	5	6	7	8	9
Odile Vuillemin	Chloé Saint-Laurent	Main						Guest		
Guillaume Cramoisan	Matthieu Pérac	Main		Flashback		Flashback		Guest		
Vanessa Valence	Fred Kancel	Main					Guest	Flashback		
Raphaël Ferret	Hyppolite de Courtène	Main								
Jean-Michel Martial	Grégoire Lamarck	Main								
Didier Ferrari	Le doc	Main								
Guillaume de Tonquédec	Le doc		Main							
Laurence Cormerais	Delphine Pérac	Recurring	Main							
Marie Kremer	Louise Drancourt		Main	Mentioned		Guest				
Philippe Bas	Thomas Rocher	Main								
Valérie Dashwood	Bérénice			Main						
Laurent Hennequin	Alexandre Hoffman			Main	Guest					
Benjamin Baroche	Antoine Garrel			Recurring	Main	Recurring	Mentioned			
Éric Berger	Tobias Roze					Main	Mentioned			
Sophie de Fürst	Emma Tomasi						Main			Guest
Juliette Roudet	Adèle Delettre				Guest	Recurring		Main		
Julia Piaton Diane Dassigny	Jessica Kancel				Guest	Recurring	Guest	Main		
