= Chris Nahon =

French film director

- Born: 5 December 1968 (age 57); Soisy-sous-Montmorency, France
- Occupations: actor, director, screenwriter
- Years active: 2001–present

Chris Nahon is a French film director best known for directing the films Kiss of the Dragon (2001), Empire of the Wolves (2005), and Blood: The Last Vampire (2008).

== Filmography ==
Film

Year	Title	Director	Writer	Notes	Ref.
2001	Kiss of the Dragon	Yes	No		
2005	Empire of the Wolves	Yes	Yes		
2008	Skate or Die	No	Yes		
2008	Blood: The Last Vampire	Yes	No	Also actor	
2016	Lady Bloodfight	Yes	No	Also editor and camera operator	

Short film

- Gri Gri (2008)

Television

Year	Title	Notes	Ref.
2011	Plus belle la vie	10 episodes	
2018-2019	Un si grand soleil	70 episodes	
