= Both Ways Open Jaws =

Studio album by The Dø
- Released: 9 March 2011
- Recorded: 2010
- Genres: Indie rock; folk rock; indie pop
- Length: 45:34
- Labels: Cinq7; Wagram; Naïve; Six Degrees; Cartel Music; Village Green
- Producer: The Dø

The Dø chronology
A Mouthful (2008)	Both Ways Open Jaws (2011)	Shake Shook Shaken (2014)

Both Ways Open Jaws is the second album by French-Finnish indie rock duo The Dø, released on 9 March 2011 in France and in late October 2011 and mid-November 2011 worldwide.

== Critical reception ==
Professional ratings
Aggregate scores
Source	Rating
Metacritic	75/100
Review scores
Source	Rating
Mezzic	(8.5/10)
One Thirty BPM	(93%, Recommended)
Pitchfork	(7.5/10)

Metacritic, a review-aggregating website, gives the album a combined rating of 75 out of 100 from 16 reviews, which is classified as a "generally favorable" reception. Only two of those were not in the "positive" range (70 or above), both judged at 40 ("mixed"). Mezzic gave the album 8.5 out of 10, saying "The follow-up to their debut A Mouthful has the band dive further into their freak-pop explorations, still striving to produce better music" and that "their sustainable collaboration has carried itself over to a promising sophomore album". BBC Music called the album "Truly impressive".

== Charts ==
Chart (2011)	Peak position
Belgian Albums (Ultratop Wallonia)	55
French Albums (SNEP)	14
Swiss Albums (Schweizer Hitparade)	34

== Track listing ==
All songs written by Olivia Bouyssou Merilahti and Dan Levy.

1. "Dust It Off" – 3:42
2. "Gonna Be Sick!" – 4:09
3. "The Wicked & the Blind" – 5:08
4. "Too Insistent" – 3:29
5. "Bohemian Dances" – 4:23
6. "Smash Them All (Night Visitors)" – 5:12
7. "Leo Leo" – 3:30
8. "B.W.O.J" – 1:43
9. "Slippery Slope" – 2:41
10. "The Calendar" – 4:03
11. "Was It a Dream?" – 3:05
12. "Quake, Mountain, Quake" – 2:10
13. "Moon Mermaids" – 3:02

=== Bonus tracks ===
14. "Open C" – 1:15
15. "No Clue" – 8:01
