= Olivia Merilahti =

Finnish-French singer (born 1982)

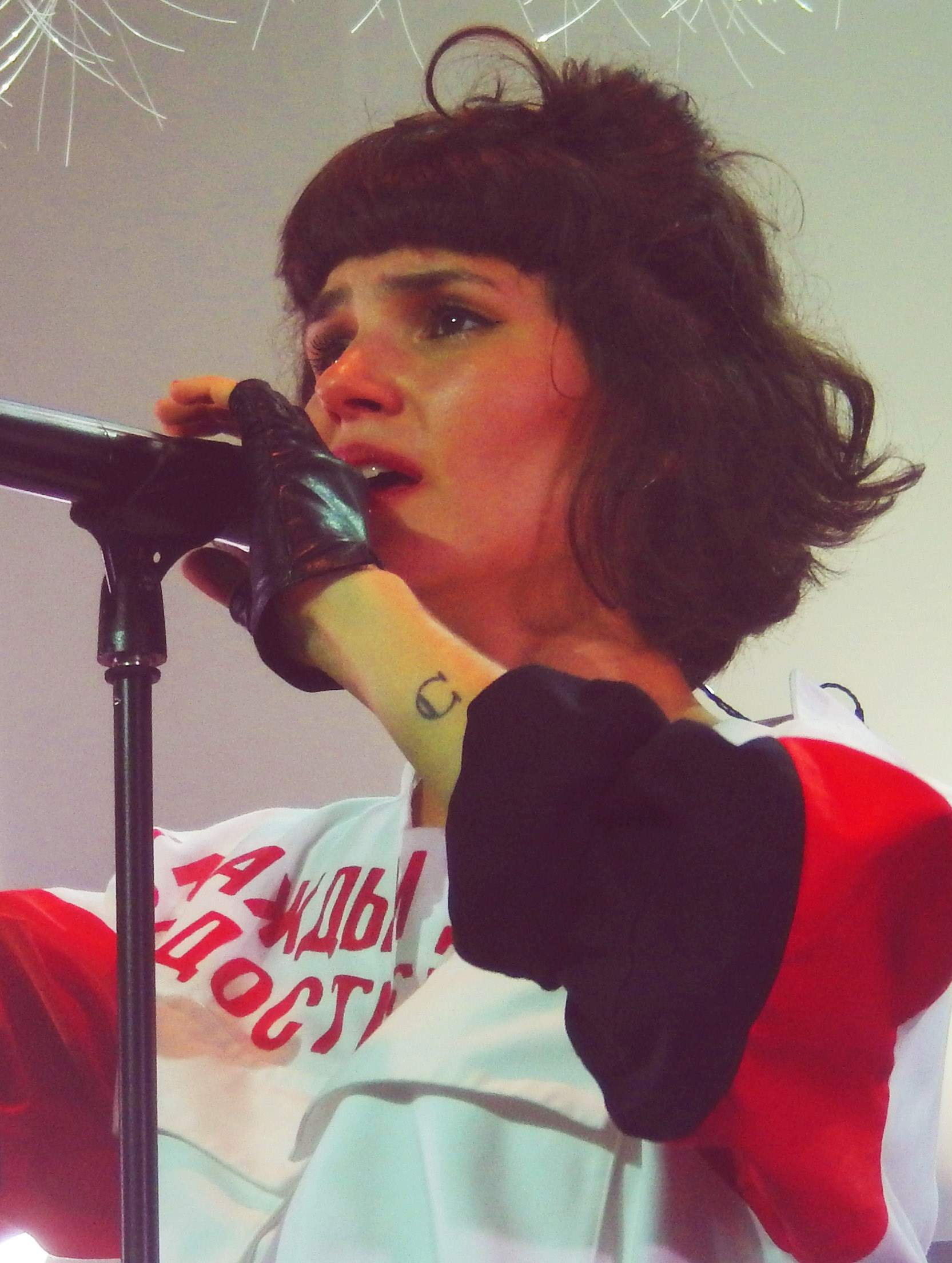
- Merilahti performing with The Dø in 2015

Background information
- Also known as: Prudence
- Born: Olivia Bouyssou; 25 February 1982 (age 44); Paris, France
- Genres: Indie rock, folk rock
- Occupations: Singer
- Instruments: Vocals, guitar, keyboards
- Years active: 2005–present
- Formerly of: The Dø (2005-2020)

Olivia Merilahti is a Finnish-French singer and composer, best known for being the frontwoman of the musical duo The Dø. Her work has been compared to that of Björk, whom she cites as a major influence. Merilahti was born to a French father and a Finnish mother. She primarily uses English in music, which she learned at an early age.

Finnish is my intimate language; I speak Finnish with my mum and I've been living in France for most of my life, so it's been my secret language. So these different languages play different roles in my life, and English has always been the musical one.

Having studied music in Paris and Helsinki, Merilahti gravitated to rock music, then jazz and electronic music. In 2004, during the writing of music from the movie Empire of the Wolves, she met Dan Levy, with whom she formed French indie rock band The Dø.

The duo released 3 albums between 2008 and 2014, toured the world and got awarded best rock album at Les Victoires de la Musique in 2015. They were several times quoted by Billie Eilish as her favourite band.

In 2018 Olivia got her first role in a movie alongside Mathieu Kassovitz, "Sparring" by Samuel Jouy. She composed the original score.

She released her first LP under the name Prudence, "Beginnings" in 2021, collaborating with various producers such as Xavier de Rosnay from Justice.

Between 2022 and 2025, Olivia collaborated with many artists such as Kavinsky, Etienne de Crecy or French 79. She also worked as a producer for many French acts such as Louane and Yoa.

Olivia is currently producing her solo album under her own name.

== Discography ==
=== Studio albums ===
Title	Details
Beginnings	Released: 28 May 2021; Label: RCA, Sony; Format: CD, digital download, LP, streaming

=== Extended plays ===
Title	Details
Be Water	Released: 4 November 2020; Label: Sony; Format: Digital download, streaming
The Submarine Files	Released: 12 November 2021; Label: RCA, Sony; Format: Digital download, streaming

=== Singles ===
==== As lead artist ====
Title	Year	Album
"Never With U"	2020	Be Water
"Passionfruit" (Drake cover)	2020	non-album single
"Offenses"	2020	Be Water
"Freed from Desire" (Gala cover)	2021	non-album single
"Good Friends"	2021	Beginnings
"Here & Now"	2021	Beginnings
"Your Power" (Billie Eilish cover)	2021	The Submarine Files
"La Nuit N'en Finit Plus" (Petula Clark cover)	2021	non-album single

==== As featured artist ====
Title	Year	Album
"The Thrill I Need" (Newem featuring Prudence)	2022	Moonpark
"Zenith" (Kavinsky featuring Prudence and Morgan Phalen)	2022	Reborn
"Feels Like Home" (Newem featuring Prudence)	2023	non-album single
"Memories" (Moodoïd (with Olivia Merilahti))	2023	PrimaDonna vol. 2
"You always say" (French 79 featuring Prudence)	2025	Teenagers

== Filmography ==
Year	Title	Notes
2005	Empire of the Wolves	Co-composed with Luca De' Medici, Grégory Fougères, Dan Levy, Pascal Morel, and Samuel Narboni
2005	The Passenger	Co-composed with Dan Levy
2005	Wild Camp	Co-composed with Dan Levy, Nicolas Baby, and Philippe Neil
2017	Sparring	Also portrays Marion Landry
2023	Aspergirl	10 episodes
