= Miguel Courtois =

French film director, film producer and screenwriter

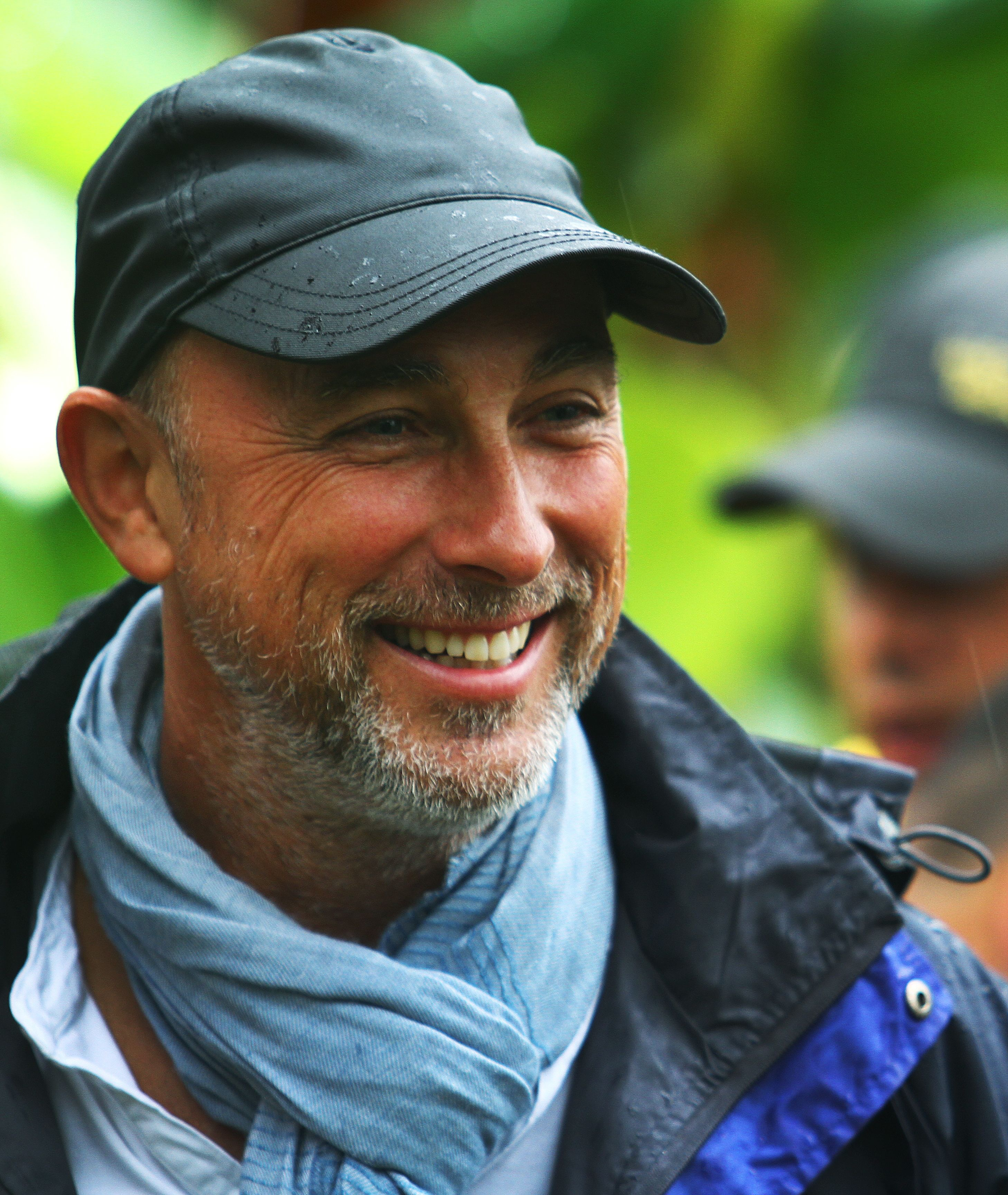
- Miguel Courtois
- Born: 1960 (age 65–66); Paris, France
- Occupation: Director
- Years active: 1988-present

Miguel Courtois (French pronunciation: [miɡɛl kuʁtwa]; born 1960) is a French/Spanish film director and producer. He is known for directing the 2004 biographical film, The Wolf.

== Filmography ==
| Year | Title | Role | Notes |
|---|---|---|---|
| 1988 | Preuve d'amour | Director & writer | |
| 1989 | Les jupons de la révolution | Director & writer | TV series (1 episode) |
| 1990 | The Hitchhiker | Director | TV series (1 episode) |
| 1992 | Une maman dans la ville | Director | TV movie |
| 1993 | Leïla née en France | Director & writer | TV movie |
| 1993 | Le sang des innocents | Director | TV movie |
| 1994 | Vengeances | Director | TV movie |
| 1994 | Le cri coupé | Director | TV movie |
| 1994 | Killer Kid | Writer & Associate Producer | |
| 1995 | Regards d'enfance | Director | TV series (1 episode) |
| 1996 | La femme rêvée | Director | TV movie |
| 1996 | Paroles d'enfant | Director | TV movie |
| 1996 | La vie avant tout | Director | TV movie |
| 1997 | Bouge ! | Producer | |
| 1997 | La bastide blanche | Director | TV mini-series |
| 1998 | Le chant de l'homme mort | Writer & producer | TV movie |
| 1998 | Vertiges | Director | TV series (1 episode) |
| 1999 | Une journée de merde ! | Director | |
| 1999 | Premières neiges | Producer | TV movie |
| 1999-2001 | La crim' | Director | TV series (8 episodes) |
| 2000-2001 | Le lycée | Director & producer | TV series (15 episodes) |
| 2001 | Un ange | Director | |
| 2002 | Féroce | Producer | |
| 2002 | Squash | Producer | Short; Nominated - Academy Award for Best Live Action Short Film; Nominated - César Award for Best Short Film |
| 2002 | Brigade des mineurs | Producer & director | TV series (3 episodes) |
| 2003 | Dissonances | Executive producer | |
| 2004 | The Wolf | Director | |
| 2004 | La citadelle Europe | Producer | Documentary |
| 2005 | 11 M historia de un atentado | Director | |
| 2005 | Seconde chance | Director | TV movie |
| 2006 | GAL | Director | |
| 2007 | Où es-tu ? | Director | TV mini-series |
| 2007 | The First Cry | Producer | Documentary; Nominated - César Award for Best Documentary Film |
| 2008 | Skate or Die | Director | |
| 2009 | Grands reporters | Producer | TV movie |
| 2011 | Le Piège Afghan | Director | TV movie |
| 2011 | Voir le pays du matin calme | Producer | TV movie |
| 2012 | Operation E | Director & writer | |
| 2014 | Resistance | Director | TV mini-series Nominated - Globe de Cristal Award for Best Television Film or Television Series |
| 2015 | Au revoir... et à bientôt ! | Director | TV movie |
| 2016 | Lundi en histoires | Director & writer | TV series (1 episode) |
| 2016-2017 | Une famille formidable | Director | TV series (8 episodes) |
