= Empire of the Wolves =

- Theatrical release poster
- Directed by: Chris Nahon
- Written by: Christian Clavier; Chris Nahon; Jean-Christophe Grangé; Franck Ollivier; Luc Bossi; Simon Michaël
- Produced by: Andrew Colton; Patrice Ledoux
- Starring: Jean Reno; Arly Jover; Jocelyn Quivrin
- Cinematography: Michel Abramowicz
- Edited by: Marco Cavé
- Music by: Olivia Bouyssou; Luca De' Medici; Grégory Fougères; Dan Levy; Pascal Morel; Samuel Narboni
- Production companies: Gaumont; TF1 Films Production
- Distributed by: Gaumont Columbia TriStar Films
- Release date: 20 April 2005
- Running time: 128 minutes
- Country: France
- Language: French
- Budget: €24.2 million; (US$27 million)
- Box office: $11.9 million

Empire of the Wolves (French: L'Empire des loups) is a 2005 French action drama film directed by Chris Nahon, written by Christian Clavier, Jean-Christophe Grangé, Chris Nahon and Franck Ollivier, and starring Jean Reno, Arly Jover, and Jocelyn Quivrin.

== Plot ==
Arly Jover plays Anna Heymes, a stylish 31-year-old Parisian housewife, who experiences nightmares and hallucinations related to a series of gruesome murders in the city. At the same time, a duo of policemen, the unorthodox Schiffer (Jean Reno) and the cautious officer Nerteaux (Jocelyn Quivrin), work to unravel the mystery surrounding the murders. The plot thickens when Anna discovers that she has been subjected to intensive reconstructive surgery, which concealed her Turkish heritage. A series of events escalates into a confrontation with the Turkish mafia and the death of Anna's would-be assassin.

== Cast ==
- Jean Reno as Jean-Louis Schiffer
- Arly Jover as Anna Heymes
- Jocelyn Quivrin as Paul Nerteaux
- Laura Morante as Mathilde Urano
- Étienne Chicot as Olivier Amien
- Philippe Bas as Laurent
- David Kammenos as Azer
- Didier Sauvegrain as Dr. Ackerman
- Patrick Floersheim as Charlier
- Albert Dray as the lieutenant
- Vernon Dobtcheff as Kudseyi
- Élodie Navarre as "fliquette"
- Philippe du Janerand as "légiste"
- Corentin Koskas as "l'interne"
- Jean-Pierre Martins as Professeur Ravi
- Jean-Marc Huber as Gurdilek
- Donatienne Dupont as Clothilde
- Jean-Michel Tinivelli as Caraccili
- Sandra Moreno as Marie-Sophie
- Laurence Gormezano as Chantal
- Vincent Grass as Marius
- Guillaume Lamant-Deboudt as Lacroux
- Emmanuelle Escourrou as Gozar
- Akim Colour as "l'ouvrier"
- Gérard Touratier as Gruss
- Aurélie Meriel as "la secrétaire"
- Emre Kinay as "le policier"
- Arnaud Duléry as "un flic médico-légal"
- Jacques Curry as Roman

== Release ==
The film premiered on 20 April 2005 in France and was on 30 July 2005 part of the Fantasy Film Fest in Munich.

== Soundtrack ==
No.	Title	Lyrics	Length
1.	"Kill Everything (Main Version)"	Skin	03:23
2.	"Passage Brady (Rap Version)" (Featuring – Demon One, Rim'K)	Intouchable	03:49
3.	"Passage Brady (Movie Version)"	Gregory Fougères and Olivia Bouyssou	01:05
4.	"Bloody Entertainer"	Dan Levy and Olivia Bouyssou	03:07
5.	"Anna Takes Revenge"	Dan Levy	01:28
6.	"Wolves"	Dan Levy and Olivia Bouyssou	04:34
7.	"Hollow Of Your Shoulder"	Gregory Fougères and Olivia Bouyssou	03:54
8.	"Black Dove"	Gregory Fougères, Olivia Bouyssou and Luca De Medici	03:33
9.	"Austerman Fight"	Samuel Narboni	02:01
10.	"Java"	Gregory Fougères and Olivia Bouyssou	02:45
11.	"Woolen Silence"	Dan Levy and Olivia Bouyssou	04:43
12.	"Columbarium"	Dan Levy	04:29
13.	"The Sewers"	Pascal Morel	02:20
14.	"Ackermann Flight"	Dan Levy	00:49
15.	"Anna's Shower Theme"	Pascal Morel	02:53
16.	"Mist On The Seine"	Luca De Medici	01:51
17.	"Requiem"	Dan Levy	03:15
18.	"Kill Everything (Movie Version)"	Skin	01:39
19.	"Metro Chase"	Gregory Fougères and Olivia Bouyssou	01:27
20.	"Cemetery"	Luca De Medici	02:29
21.	"Arrival In Turkey"	Dan Levy	03:33
22.	"Azer's Hill"	Dan Levy	02:03
23.	"China Doll (Remix)"	Dan Levy and Olivia Bouyssou	03:38
24.	"Anna Laurent Theme"	Samuel Narboni	03:09
25.	"Police Station"	Luca De Medici	03:51
26.	"China Doll"	Dan Levy and Olivia Bouyssou	02:25
