= Gilles Legardinier =

French novelist (born 1965)

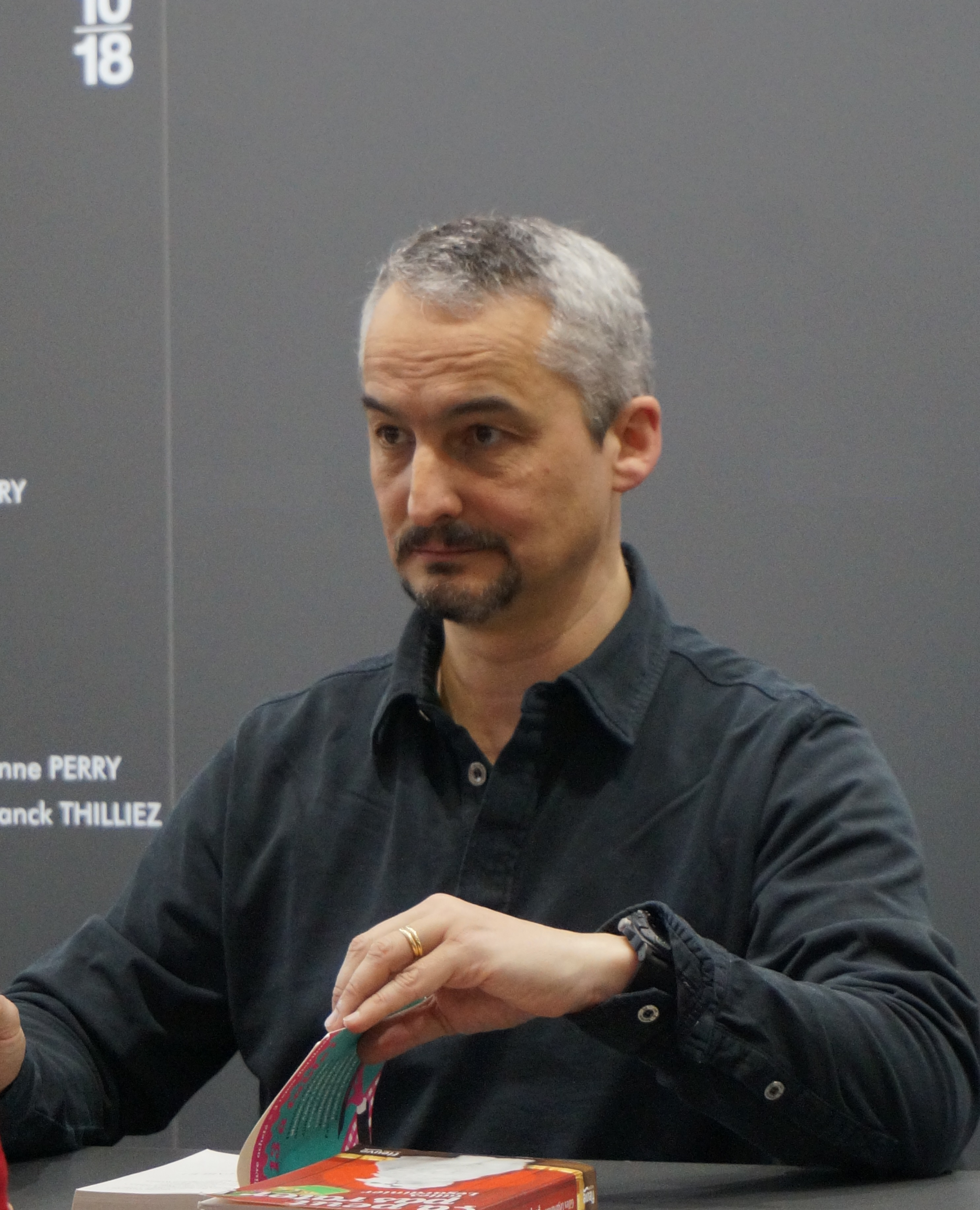
- Gilles Legardinier in 2015
- Born: 1965 (age 60–61)
- Occupation: Novelist

Gilles Legardinier (born 1965) is a French novelist. He was the recipient of the 2010 Prix SNCF du polar. He was the third best-selling author in France in 2014.

== Early life ==
Gilles Legardinier was born in 1965. He was abandoned as an infant in front of a chapel in the 6th arrondissement of Paris. He did not pass his Baccalaureate.

== Career ==
Legardinier started his career in the film industry.

Legardinier is the author of several best-selling novels. His 2009 novel, L'exil des anges, received the 2010 Prix SNCF du polar. His 2011 novel, Demain j'arrête !, was a best-seller. By 2014, he was the third best-selling author in France after Guillaume Musso and Marc Levy, having sold 1.9 million books. His work has been translated into 20 languages.

== Works ==
- Legardinier, Gilles (1996). Le Secret de la cité sans soleil. Paris: Éditions J'ai lu. ISBN 9782290043141. OCLC 463950537.
- Legardinier, Gilles; Legardinier, Pascale (2001). Comme une ombre. Paris: Éditions J'ai lu. ISBN 9782290312384. OCLC 468608327.
- Legardinier, Gilles (2002). Le sceau des maîtres. Paris: Editions J'ai lu. ISBN 9782290316429. OCLC 469429330.
- Legardinier, Gilles (2002). Le dernier géant. Paris: Editions J'ai lu. ISBN 9782290321409. OCLC 401685129.
- Legardinier, Gilles (2009). L'exil des anges. Paris: Pocket. ISBN 9782266196338.
- Legardinier, Gilles (2011). Nous étions les hommes. Paris: Pocket. ISBN 9782266220354. OCLC 893769591.
- Legardinier, Gilles (2011). Demain j'arrête !. Paris: Fleuve noir. ISBN 9782265094307. OCLC 780325271.
- Legardinier, Gilles (2012). Complètement cramé !. Paris: Fleuve noir. ISBN 9782265097025. OCLC 820663316.
- Legardinier, Gilles (2013). Et soudain tout change. Paris: Fleuve noir. ISBN 9782265097506. OCLC 863154539.
- Legardinier, Gilles (2014). Ça peut pas rater !. Paris: Fleuve éditions. ISBN 9782265098367. OCLC 893976202.
- Legardinier, Gilles (2015). Quelqu'un pour qui trembler. Paris: Fleuve éditions. ISBN 9782265099272. OCLC 925665891.
- Legardinier, Gilles (2016). Le premier miracle. Paris: Flammarion. ISBN 9782081383784. OCLC 961012356.
- Legardinier, Gilles (2017). Une fois dans ma vie. Paris: Flammarion. ISBN 9782081416925. OCLC 1005737861.
- Legardinier, Gilles (2019). Pour un instant d'éternité. Paris: Flammarion. ISBN 9782081420274. OCLC 1127391598.
