= The Biggest Tour I Have Done So Far Tour =

2016 concert tour by Ben Rector

- Tour by Ben Rector
- Location: United States
- Start date: August 24, 2016
- End date: October 23, 2016
- No. of shows: 20

Ben Rector concert chronology
- The Brand New Tour; The Biggest Tour I Have Done So Far Tour; Magic: The Tour

The Biggest Tour I Have Done So Far Tour is a 2016 concert tour from American singer-songwriter Ben Rector. Aptly named, it was his largest tour at the time.

== Background ==
In 2015 Ben Rector released the album Brand New. The album, especially the single of the same name, was a commercial success and brought Rector to more mainstream attention; the album peaked at 9th on Billboard 200, and the song "Brand New" had 41 million streams on Spotify by 2019 and saw over 40 television and movie placements. His headlining tour, The Brand New Tour spanning two legs, was equally successful; the first leg having 15 sold-out shows and selling over 41,000 tickets.

In support of the touring success he followed up The Brand New Tour with The Biggest Tour I Have Done So Far Tour, the second headlining tour for Brand New spanning an additional 20 shows. The tour featured opening acts from Jacob Whitesides and Colony House. Bandmates that performed alongside Rector included Cody Fry and Cory Wong. Crew for the tour included tour manager Jordan Powell, production manager Jake Hartfield, and lighting director Daniel Rehbein. It was Rector's largest-scale tour at the time. Having found that with prior tours were "out of control" despite his efforts, he felt more relaxed and willing with The Biggest Tour I Have Done So Far Tour. Touring for Brand New spanned 73 dates, and due to the additional touring efforts for The Biggest Tour I Have Done So Far Tour, his following album Magic was postponed until 2018. It was the longest release gap between two of Rector's albums.

== Setlist ==
The following setlist was obtained from the concert held on October 23, 2016, at the State Theatre in Minneapolis, Minnesota. It does not represent all concerts for the duration of the tour.

1. "Fear"
2. "Let the Good Times Roll"
3. "Loving You is Easy" / "ABC"
  (Jackson 5 cover)
4. "When a Heart Breaks"
5. "Crazy"
6. "30,000 Feet"
7. "Sailboat"
8. "I Like You"
9. "When I'm With You"
10. "Forever Like That"
11. "I Wanna Dance With Somebody"
  (Whitney Houston cover)
12. "The Beat"
13. "Cha Cha Slide"
  (DJ Casper cover)
14. "White Dress"

Encore

1. "Brand New"
2. "The Men That Drive Me Places"

== Tour dates ==
Date	City	Venue
North America
August 24, 2016	Columbus, Ohio	Newport Music Hall
August 25, 2016	Louisville, Kentucky	Palace Theatre
August 26, 2016	Tuscaloosa, Alabama	Tuscaloosa Amphitheater
August 27, 2016	Nashville, Tennessee	Ascend Amphitheater
September 3, 2016	Freeport, Maine	L.L. Bean Discovery Park
September 22, 2016	Charlottesville, Virginia	Jefferson Theater
September 23, 2016	Charlotte, North Carolina	Charlotte Metro Credit Union Amphitheatre
September 24, 2016	Raleigh, North Carolina	Red Hat Amphitheater
September 29, 2016	Norfolk, Virginia	The NorVa
September 30, 2016	Atlanta, Georgia	Chastain Park Amphitheatre
October 6, 2016	Tulsa, Oklahoma	Tulsa Theater
October 7, 2016	Edmond, Oklahoma	Oklahoma Christian University
October 9, 2016	College Station, Texas	Rudder Auditorium
October 10, 2016	Dallas, Texas	State Fair of Texas
October 14, 2016	New Orleans, Louisiana	House of Blues
October 15, 2016	Memphis, Tennessee	Minglewood Hall
October 16, 2016	Knoxville, Tennessee	Tennessee Theatre
October 21, 2016	Chicago, Illinois	Chicago Theatre
October 22, 2016	Indianapolis, Indiana	Old National Centre
October 23, 2016	Minneapolis, Minnesota	State Theater

== See also ==
- The Old Friends Acoustic Tour
