= The Walking in Between =

Studio album by Ben Rector
- Released: August 20, 2013
- Genre: Rock, pop
- Label: Aptly Named
- Producer: Jamie Kenney, Charlie Peacock

Ben Rector chronology
Something Like This (2011)	The Walking in Between (2013)	Brand New (2015)

The Walking in Between is the fifth studio album released by American singer-songwriter Ben Rector, released in 2013. It was partly produced by Jamie Kenney and Charlie Peacock, and partially self-produced. It is the first release by Rector on his self-founded label, Aptly Named Recordings. In recent years, Rector found his high levels of success to be overwhelming. He expected the success to satisfying, though found it instead in "walking in between" moments of daily life. This would inspire the direction of The Walking in Between. The album was built around accessibility and honesty in Rector's feelings.

"Beautiful" released ahead as a single, and the album released on August 20, 2013. Following the release was "The Walking In Between Tour" featuring Tyrone Wells, spanning 32 cities. The album was positively received by critics, and appeared on several Billboard charts, including No. 16 on Billboard 200.

== Background and composition ==
"Every song, TV show, movie is always crazier than anyone's life I know. I don't know everybody, but I do know people who have normal jobs and normal lifestyles, and nobody really lives like that all the time. So it's weird that everything that is entertainment in our culture acts like that is what it's like all the time. I was just like, 'Wow, nobody is really looking at real life and thinking, 'Hey this is worth celebrating too.'' So, that was my feeling behind that stuff."

— Ben Rector, 2014 interview

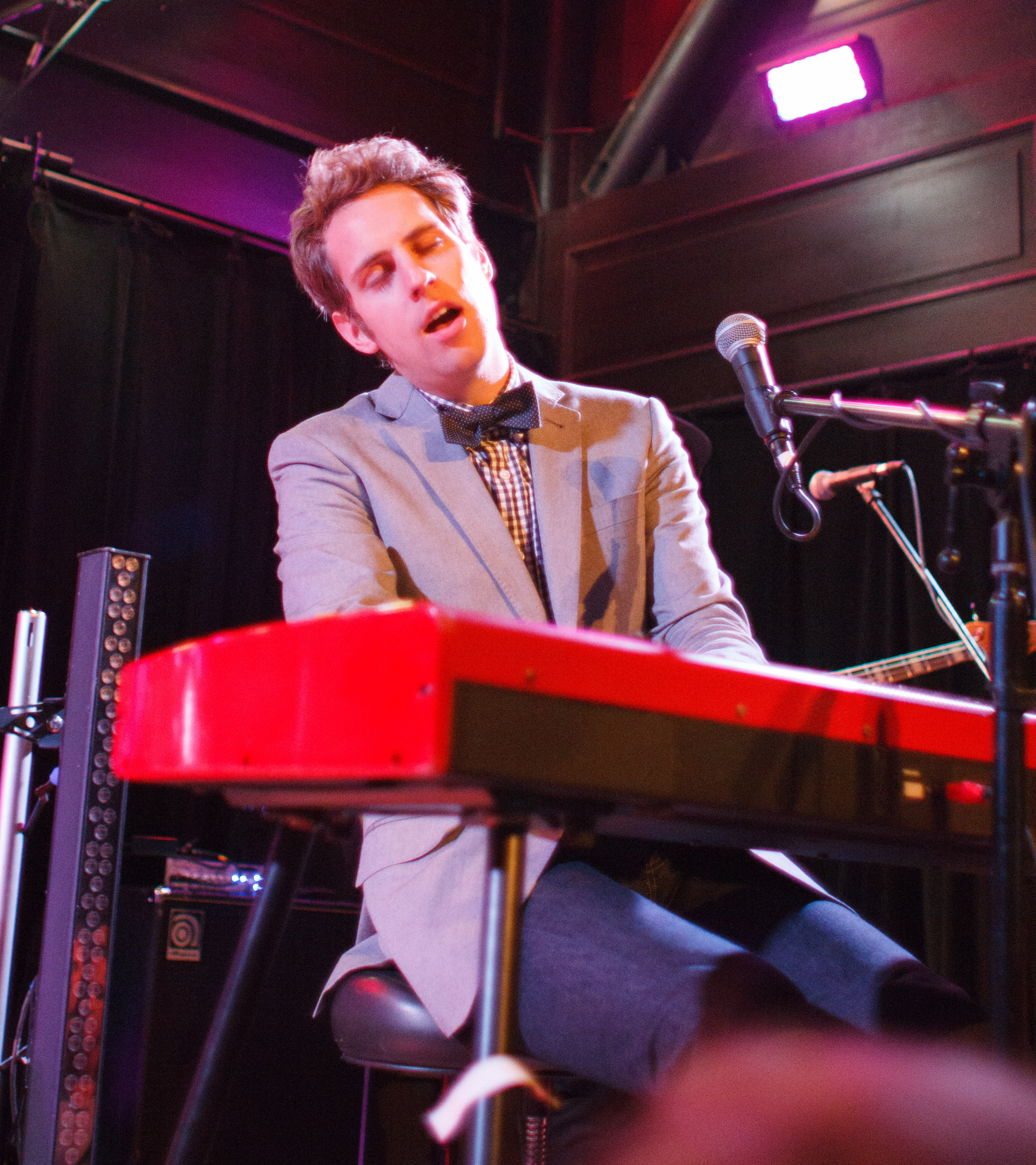
Rector in 2012

The Walking in Between is the first album release under Ben Rector's own label, Aptly Named Recordings, in association with the brand-management company ROAR. Rector founded the label for utility reasons; he needed an entity to release music under. Staff that worked alongside Rector for the album included co-founder of ROAR Bernie Cahill, booking agent Jeff Krones from the Creative Artists Agency, and Jim Merlis of Big Hassle for publicity. The album was produced by Jamie Kenney and Charlie Peacock, with additional work from Rector. Finding it difficult to write while touring, the album was while he was not doing so.

Having formed his own record label and finding an increasing level of success, particularly in his recent years of touring, he found the experience overwhelming. It was a field he did not believe he fit in well with, and a pessimist by nature, he also did not expect to be in that position. Although he originally expected to find true satisfaction with himself in success, he instead found it in the "ordinary", such as spending time with his friends or his wife Hillary. The themes of the album was shaped around the title, derived from the song "I Like You": "Life is not the mountaintops, it’s the walking in between." The album discusses finding joy in the in-between moments of life, outside of "mountain top" moments of success.

Acknowledging that he wasn't the only one making pop music, Rector wanted to emphasize what makes his music unique, which is a level of accessibility with narrative depth when explored. He described it as a "marriage of accessibility and craft, a record that’s pleasant to listen to and can be enjoyed at face value, but that also has depth and solid foundation if you dig any deeper musically or lyrically." Rector found the best way to create a song that listeners could relate to was by being honest in his work. He details his personality and his experiences in songs such as "Ordinary Love" and "Thank God For the Summertime", songs which explore simple joys in life. Rector is particularly partial to "Making Money", a song that was performed unedited in one take. He was inspired to write the song by a comedic Twitter account that requested to buy the album with a non-monetary payment, such as high-fives, and Rector replied yes "as long as he can pay his mortgage" with them. Compared to his previous album, Something Like This, he felt The Walking in Between was more focused on a unified theme.

== Promotion and release ==
There was little press advertisement done for The Walking in Between as Rector expected the press to not know who he was. He toured in the summer of 2013 with "The Rectour", where some songs from the album were played prior to its release. "Beautiful" released ahead of the album as a single, and The Walking in Between released August 20, 2013. In September 2013 Rector performed an acoustic cover of "I Like You" via the LR Boggs YouTube channel, an acoustic guitar accessory company. Rector toured for the album following the release in the fall with "The Walking In Between Tour" featuring Tyrone Wells, beginning on September 18 in Seattle, Washington and spanning 32 cities, concluding on November 9. One of the locations on the tour included Cain's Ballroom in Tulsa, Oklahoma. This would be his second time performing there, the first in 2005 as his first live performance. A live album recording of his performance in Denver, Colorado, Live in Denver, released on September 16, 2014. A orchestra rendition of "Sailboat" by Cody Fry was featured on his 2021 album Symphony Sessions, featuring Rector.

== Critical reception ==
Rector's voice was lauded, and considered to be "crystalline quality" by Atlanta Music Guide's Rosie Judd. Mark Jenkins of The Washington Post and Matt Collar of AllMusic praised the album's themes, and Jenkins noted that most of the songs could be "wedding standards". Collar enjoyed the album for Rector's interpretation of everyday life. Judd praised "Sailboat" for its escapism and Chelsea Gammon of The MBU Timeline appreciated it for its honesty. Judd also lauded Rector's songwriting ability in the songs "Making Money" and "I Like You". HuffPost's John Chattman declared the album a "smash". Critics appreciated the album's compelling simplicity; Judd referred to the album as a "Sunday afternoon record", Gammon called the album "passionately calm and vividly expressive", and Jenkins particularly appreciated the anthem-like "When I'm With You" and "Ordinary Love".

== Commercial performance ==
The Walking in Between appeared on several Billboard charts. It debuted at 16 on the Billboard 200, appearing on the chart for two weeks. It also debuted at 16 on the Top Album Sales chart and remained for two weeks. It reached number 2 on Billboard's Folk Albums chart and number 5 on Top Rock Albums. It also debuted and peaked at number 5 on Top Rock & Alternative Albums. It spent two weeks on the Top Current Album Sales and Independent Albums charts, debuting and peaking at number 16 and number 2 respectively. "Ordinary Love" peaked at 37 on the Hot Rock & Alternative Songs chart, 27 on Rock Digital Song Sales, and 37 on Hot Rock Songs in August 2013. Recognizing that he had yet to see any spikes in his career via charting or usage of his music in pop culture, he attributed the success of the album and his career to word of mouth communication from fans.

The associated live album, Live in Denver, also charted. It appeared at number 40 on the Top Rock Albums, number 3 on the Americana/Folk Albums chart, and 40 on Top Rock & Alternative Albums. All the proceeds from The Walking in Between were donated to build a well in Zambia via World Vision International.

"Beautiful" was highlighted by iTunes via their Single of the Week promotion in July 2013, and Live Nation Entertainment selected Rector for their "One's to Watch" program, two achievements that further advanced Rector's career. It sparked international attention, and Cahill was receiving interest from large record companies, although Cahill commented that "It would take a pretty remarkable label deal to get him to blink."

== Track listing ==
The Walking in Between track listing
No.	Title	Length
1.	"Ordinary Love"	3:40
2.	"When I'm With You"	3:46
3.	"Beautiful"	3:59
4.	"Making Money"	3:20
5.	"I Like You"	2:18
6.	"Sailboat"	3:58
7.	"Follow You"	3:39
8.	"If You Can Hear Me"	3:31
9.	"Wildfire"	2:57
10.	"Forever Like That"	4:14
11.	"Life Keeps Moving On"	3:16
12.	"Thank God For the Summertime"	3:22
13.	"Forever Like That (Acoustic)"	4:19
Total length:		46:23

== Charts ==
Chart (2013)	Peak position
US Billboard 200	16
US Digital Albums (Billboard)	6
US Independent Albums (Billboard)	4
US Folk Albums (Billboard)	2
US Top Rock Albums (Billboard)	5
