= Something Like This =

Studio album by Ben Rector
- Released: September 13, 2011
- Length: 38:16
- Label: Good Time
- Producer: Ben Rector and Chad Copelin

Ben Rector chronology
Into the Morning (2010)	Something Like This (2011)	The Walking in Between (2013)

Something Like This is the fourth studio album released by American singer-songwriter Ben Rector. It was his first album after graduating from the University of Arkansas and relocating from Tulsa, Oklahoma to Nashville, Tennessee. It peaked at No. 11 on the Billboard Top Independent Albums charts and No. 41 on the Billboard 200, and charted 1st on the Singer-Songwriter chart on iTunes and 4th overall.

The album had minor advertising, mainly covers and a street interview for his YouTube channel. The songs "Let the Good Times Roll" and "She Is" released ahead of the album as singles, following the full independent release on September 13, 2011. Rector had a promotional live tour for the album, The Good Time Tour, spanning 5 weeks and over 25 cities. Lady Antebellum would also cover "She Is" in 2014 for their album 747.

== Background and production ==
"When I started out, I had my hands on everything, and now I can't really do that anymore just because there are too many moving parts. I had a really strong hand in the production of those records, and that's a great part of my creativity. But I realized that you don't get any bonus points for writing all the parts or playing all the instruments."

— Ben Rector, 2013 Charleston City Paper interview

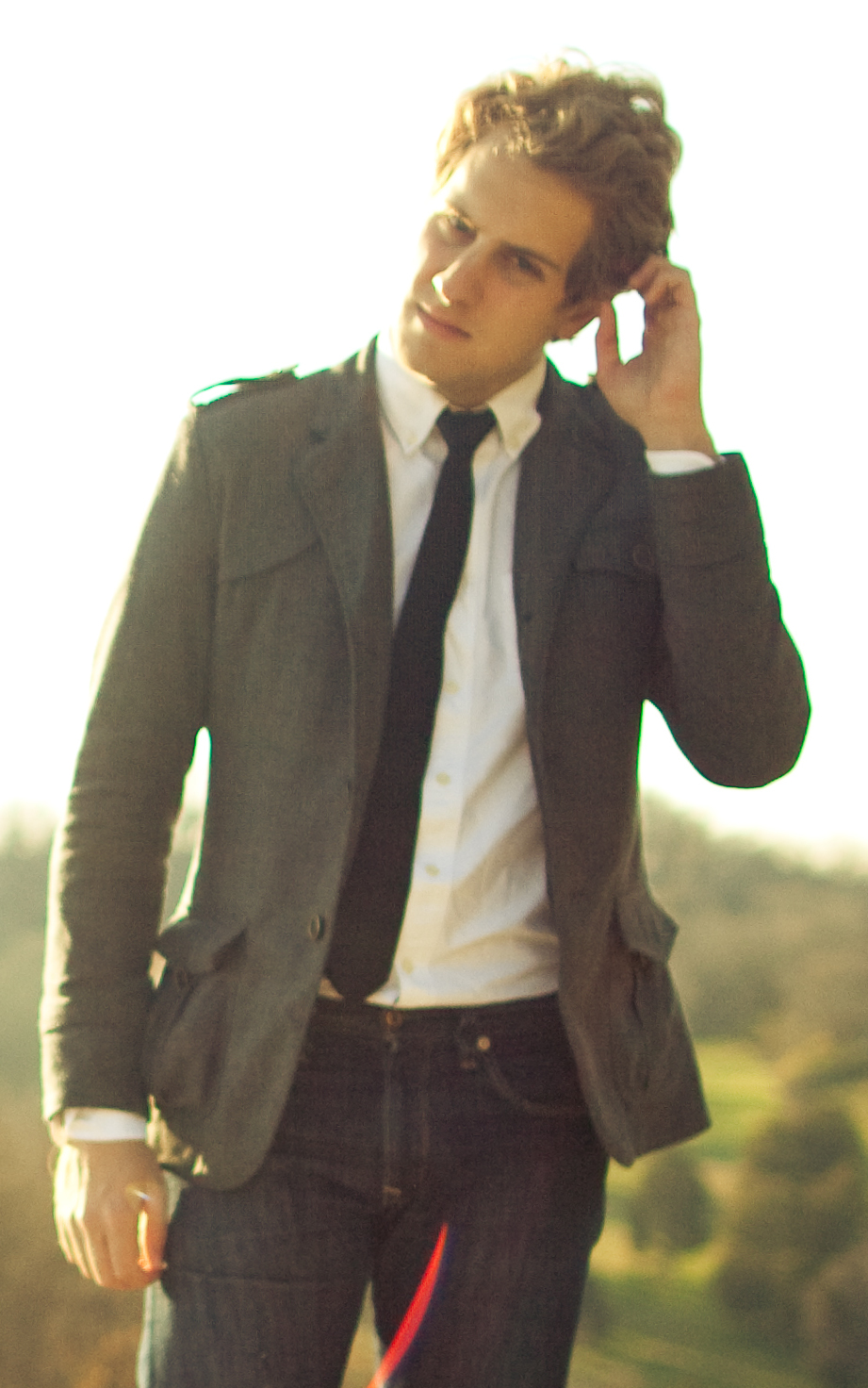
Rector in 2010

Something Like This began production shortly after both Rector's graduation from the University of Arkansas and his relocation from Tulsa, Oklahoma to Nashville, Tennessee. This was the first album were Rector received a large portion of help from others relating to performing instruments, producing music, and booking concerts; it had come to the point where the task had become too difficult for him to do on his own. Half of the album was recorded in Dallas, Texas.

== Promotion and release ==
Promotion for Something Like This, according to Rector's manager Paul Steele, was purposefully kept minimal. Steele wanted to focus marketing efforts on people who were already familiar with both him and his music, including those who have seen him live or follow him on social media. "A couple hundred dollars" was spent on a Facebook ad, and other advertising efforts included two placements on iTunes and four YouTube videos. One YouTube video included a cover of "I Wanna Dance With Somebody" by Whitney Houston, recorded at Blackwatch Studios. Although it was suggested by a friend as a joke, Rector selected the song because of its simplicity and popularity. Houston died shortly after its completion, and Rector feared people would see the cover as him taking advantage of the opportunity. He also covered "Something in the Way" by James Taylor in the same session. Although he had a lot of content on his channel it was generally low quality, and he wanted something professional on his account in case people looked him up when he was touring. Another YouTube video saw Rector stopping people in the streets and asking them if they are excited for the release of Ben Rector's Something Like This; everyone responded by telling him they don't know who Ben Rector is. The promotional efforts saw his Facebook account increase from 5,800 followers to 26,200, and his Twitter account from 2,500 to 13,900 in the span of one year. Rector attributed the increasing success, which had been a steady increase without spikes, to word-of-mouth communication from his fans.

Something Like This released on September 13, 2011, with "Let the Good Times Roll" and "She Is" releasing prior as singles. The gap between the album and the album prior was only one year, which Rector found "ridiculous" in retrospect, although he simply wanted to get more music out because he was excited to write more. Following the release was a supporting headlining tour, "The Good Time Tour", starting on September 25, 2011 and spanning five weeks and over 25 cities. Over half of the shows sold out in advance. Shortly afterward he opened for Needtobreathe during The Reckoning Tour in 2012. "She Is", the seventh song on the album, would be covered by Lady Antebellum on their 2014 album 747.

== Commercial performance ==
Something Like This debuted at 41 on both the Billboard 200 and Top Album Sales chart. It also debuted at 15 on the Top Rock Albums and Top Rock & Alternative Albums charts, 39 on Top Current Album Sales, 11 on both the Independent Albums and Digital Albums charts. It charted at 1st on the Singer/Songwriter album chart on iTunes, 5 minutes after its release. It peaked 4th on iTunes overall, behind Lady Antebellum, Coldplay, and Adele and surpassing Tha Carter IV by Lil Wayne. Rector was spotlighted by Amazon via their "Artist On The Rise" program throughout October and November in 2011. The success of the release and Rector's increasing fame helped see his staff grow, and Steele began looking for supporting partnerships. According to Steele, "We've proven he can sell records; last week is a good testament to that."

== Track listing ==
Something Like This track listing
No.	Title	Length
1.	"Let the Good Times Roll"	3:08
2.	"Song for the Suburbs"	3:40
3.	"Never Gonna Let you Go"	3:15
4.	"Without You"	3:40
5.	"Hide Away"	3:20
6.	"You and Me"	3:57
7.	"She Is"	3:24
8.	"Wanna be Loved"	3:27
9.	"Way I Am"	4:08
10.	"Falling in Love"	2:44
11.	"Home"	3:36
Total length:		38:35

== Charts ==
Chart (2011)	Peak position
US Billboard 200	41
US Digital Albums (Billboard)	11
US Independent Albums (Billboard)	11
US Top Rock Albums (Billboard)	15
