= Ben Rector =

American singer-songwriter (born 1986)

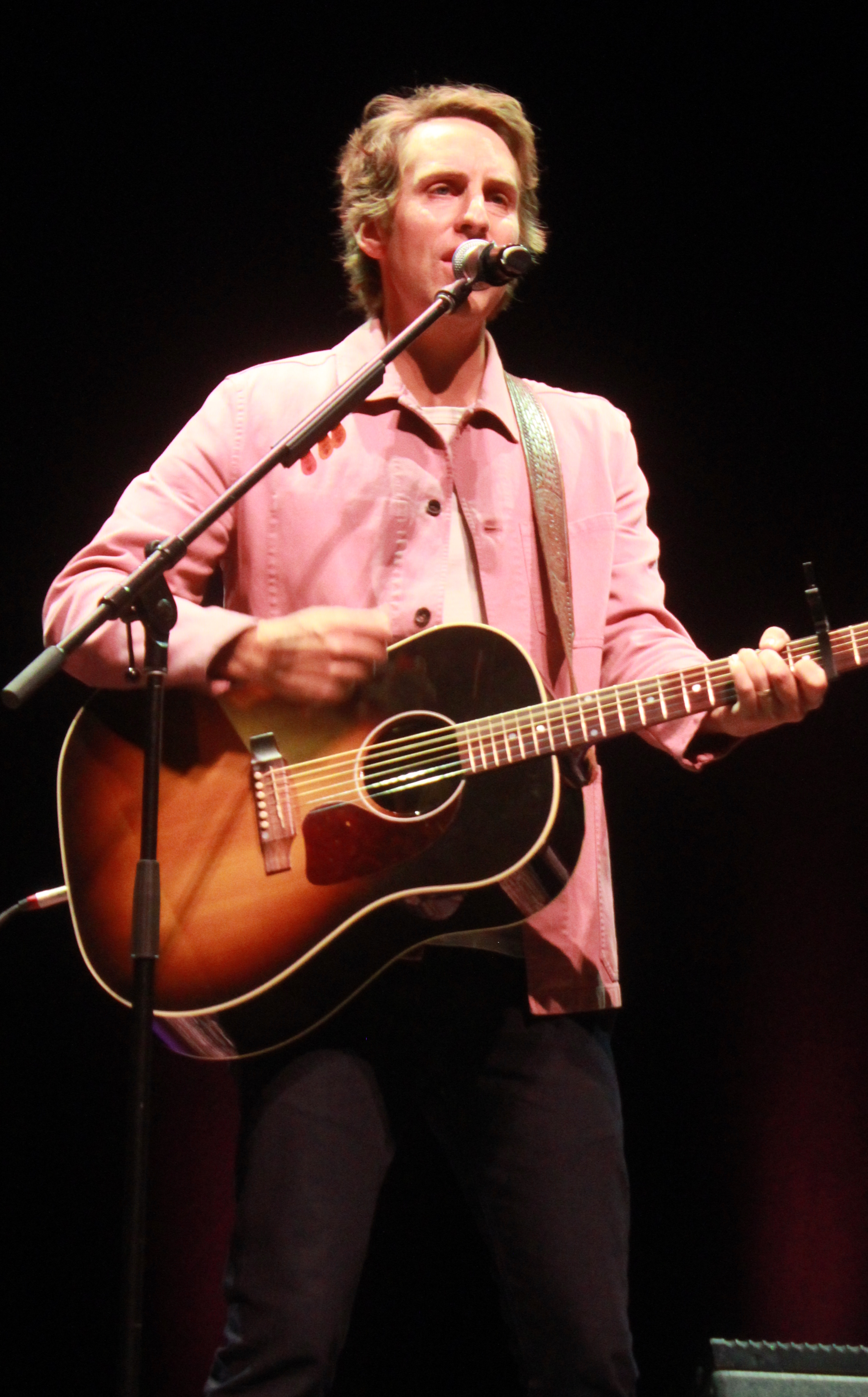
- Rector performing in 2024

Background information
- Born: Benjamin Evans Rector; November 6, 1986 (age 39); Tulsa, Oklahoma, U.S.
- Genres: Americana; pop; pop rock
- Occupations: Singer; songwriter; musician
- Instruments: Piano; guitar; vocals
- Works: Ben Rector discography
- Years active: 2006–present
- Labels: Aptly Named/Roar; OK Kid
- Website: benrectormusic.com
- Ben Rector's voice Rector answering the question "What is your go-to Chick-fil-A order?" at The Old Friends Acoustic Tour during a Q&A session Recorded October 12, 2024

Benjamin Evans Rector (born November 6, 1986) is an American singer, songwriter, and record producer based in Nashville, Tennessee. He is an independent artist, and releases music under his own label OK Kid Recordings. Rector's career has with RIAA Gold and RIAA Platinum certifications, including his 2015 album Brand New and 2018's Magic which both peaked at No. 1 on Billboard US Folk and No. 2 on Billboard US Rock and US Indie charts. Since 2011's Something Like This, most albums debuted on the Billboard 200. His songs have received airplay on Hot AC, Top 40, Country, AAA, and Christian radio stations.

Rector has a dedicated fanbase, regularly performing sold-out shows at amphitheaters across the United States with each album release. In addition to album-backed tours he completed The Old Friends Acoustic Tour spanning 2020 to 2024, and a run of symphonic performances with Cody Fry in 2023 to 2024 that premiered with two sold out nights at the Kennedy Center. He recently headlined 26 live shows nationwide throughout 2025 in conjunction with his album The Richest Man in the World; his final show at the Delta Center was his largest ever.

Televised credits include appearances on Jimmy Kimmel Live!, Conan, The Today Show, Good Morning America, Live With Kelly and Ryan, the 2017 Stanley Cup Finals, the 2025 NBA playoff finals, The Kelly Clarkson Show, the AT&T Pebble Beach Pro-Am, season 19 of American Idol as a celebrity mentor, and the Macy's Thanksgiving Day Parade. His songs have appeared on more than 100 major television shows, ad campaigns, and movies. Rector's accolades include a GMA Dove Award for a choir production of his 2022 song "Joy" and a Daytime Emmy nomination for a performance of his 2018 song "Old Friends".

== Personal life ==
Rector was born in south Tulsa, Oklahoma. He is the son of Evans Rector, a banker, and Bette Rector, a psychologist. He has two sisters. He did not grow up in a musical household, although Evans was a fan of Steve Winwood and Rector became a fan of his work at a young age. He became interested in music in eighth grade, listening to the Star 103 radio station in Tulsa, which played music from the 1960s and 1970s; this is where he grew fond of pop music. The first song he learned on piano was the theme song of the animated television series Rugrats in the 1990s.

He took some piano lessons as a child, and after being inspired by camp counselors at a summer camp who played acoustic guitar, he began learning the instrument at 16, which later led him to begin songwriting at 16. His first song, titled "Tonight", was an acoustic guitar piece about kissing a girl. Rector attended high school at Tulsa's Metro Christian Academy. One class he took was dedicated to praise and worship music, which he credits as the beginning of his interest in music. Each week he was taught music technique, how to form a set, and how to perform in a band. He would practice these skills while playing music at his church.

Rector began learning how to sing after watching a performance by Ben Kilgore at his high school. He also formed a high school band, Euromart, for a Battle of the Bands competition hosted by newspaper Tulsa World. His first performance was at Cain's Ballroom. He would re-recruit Euromart to perform in the music video for his song "Old Friends" in 2018. Throughout high school he would perform locally. He graduated from Tulsa's Metro Christian Academy in 2005, and from the University of Arkansas in 2010 with a degree in business and marketing.

Rector met his wife Hillary at the University of Arkansas their freshman year. They married in 2009 and relocated to Nashville shortly afterward. They had one daughter in 2017, Jane, and twin sons in 2020, Roy and Robert "Bert". He is an avid golfer, playing at private clubs and notable golf courses while on the road, and has competed in the AT&T Pebble Beach Pro-Am. Rector is a Christian.

== Music career ==
=== 2006–2009: Early career ===
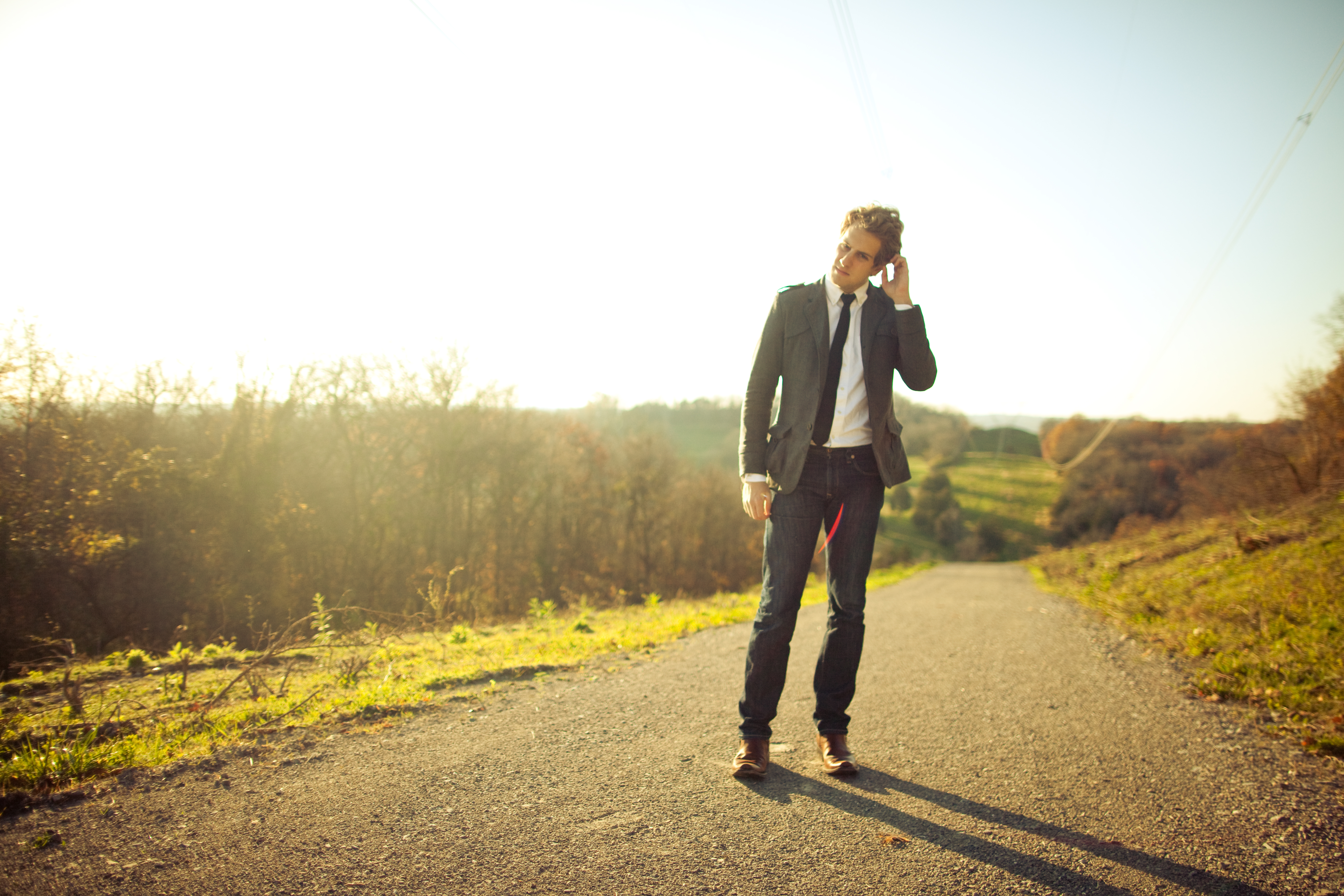
Rector posing for the album cover of Into the Morning in 2010

Rector started seriously writing songs in college and began looking at it as something that needed to be practiced. He released his first musical effort, a self-titled extended play (EP), in 2006. After hearing about the 2006 John Lennon Songwriting Contest he submitted a song from the EP, "Conversation"; Rector would win the grand prize in the Pop category, making him the youngest person to win the contest. His sophomore year he would attend classes in the weekdays and tour exclusively on the weekends, performing two to three shows a week. He would perform out of town, specifically anywhere within an 8-hour radius. Rector described his early impressions of the music industry as a "fish out of water"; he gained more confidence as he noticed that the people attending his performances were exclusively those he did not recognize, giving him hope that he could pursue a music career. A particular moment of clarity came when he performed at the Cambridge Room in Dallas, Texas to a sold-out crowd of 350 people, exclusively fans.

Rector released Twenty Tomorrow in 2007, his first full-length studio album. His second album, Songs That Duke Wrote, released in 2008. In April 2009, he was given the Northwest Arkansas Music Award (NAMA) for best male singer-songwriter.

=== 2010–2014: Into the Morning, Something Like This and The Walking in Between ===
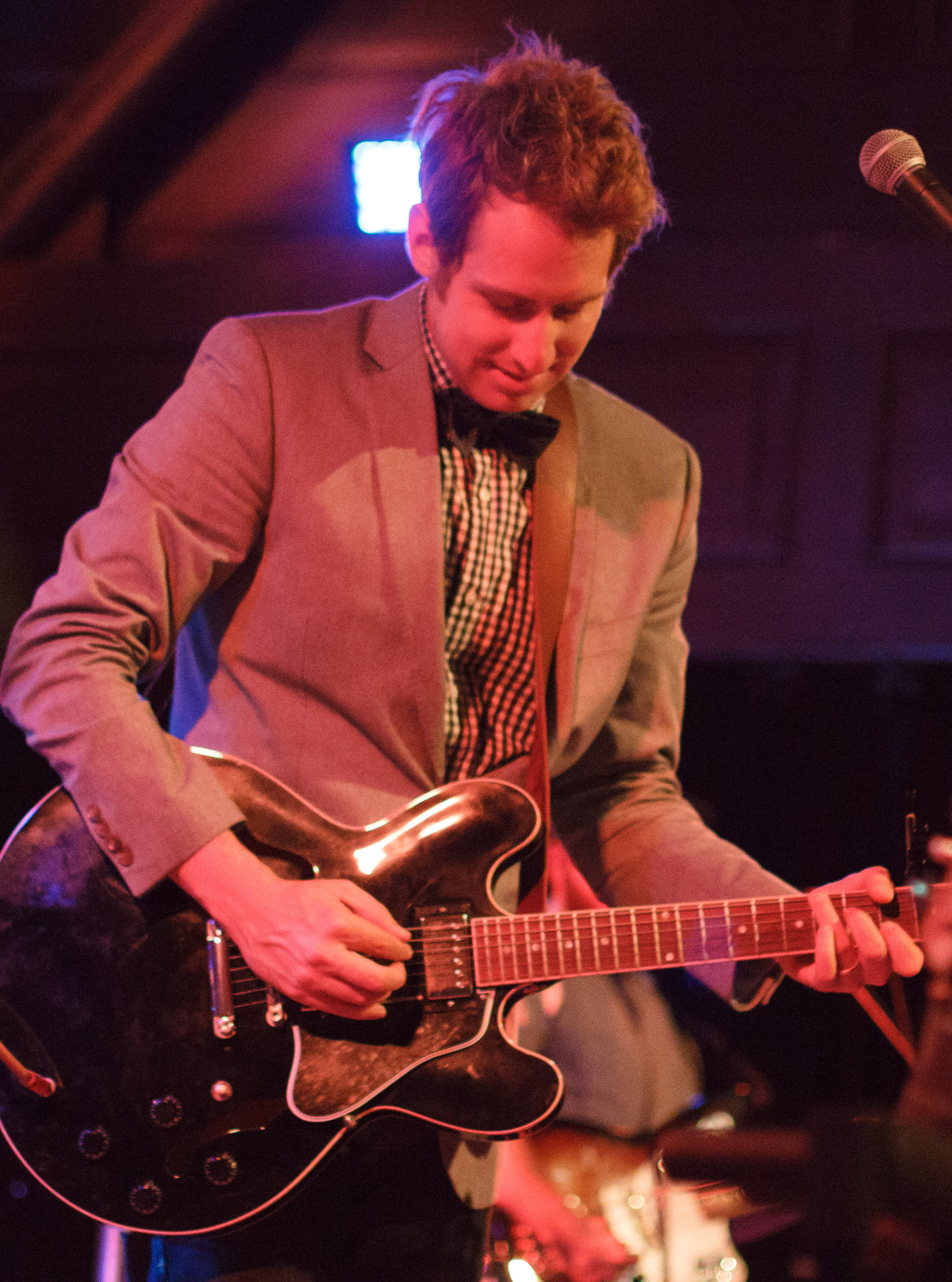
Rector performing in 2013

Rector's third studio album, Into the Morning, was released on February 16, 2010, and relocated to Nashville, Tennessee after his college graduation. Rector was particularly drawn to Nashville for its atmosphere and high level of music activity. Into the Morning was his first album to perform on the Billboard charts, peaking at No. 11 on the Top Heatseekers. Following the release, he co-headlined the Three Amigos Tour with Steve Moakler and Andrew Ripp. The rest of 2010 brought support slots with Dave Barnes and Five for Fighting, and The Beat Lives Forever co-headline tour with Drew Holcomb and the Neighbors. In early 2011, he performed on the VH1 Best Cruise Ever with artists including Train, The Script, Colbie Caillat, and Lifehouse.

Something Like This released just one year after Into the Morning, on September 13, 2011. It was his first album to appear on the Billboard 200. Throughout September 2011 Rector toured in association with Something Like This with The Good Time Tour, performing in over 25 cities. Rector was spotlighted by Amazon via their "Artist On The Rise" program throughout October and November in 2011. "She Is", the seventh song on the album, was covered by Lady Antebellum on their 2014 album 747.

Produced by Rector, Jamie Kenney and Charlie Peacock, 2013's The Walking in Between was the first release on Rector's own Aptly Named Recordings label, which released on August 20, 2013. He toured 32 cities for the album with The Walking in Between Tour throughout October 2013. "Beautiful" was highlighted by iTunes via their Single of the Week promotion in July 2013, and Live Nation Entertainment selected Rector for their "One's to Watch" program, two achievements that further advanced Rector's career. In 2014, Rector briefly took a break from songwriting to front the Huey Lewis and the News cover band Newy Lewis and the Hues, releasing a three-song EP on August 8, 2014, singing and recording all parts.

=== 2015–2017: Brand New ===
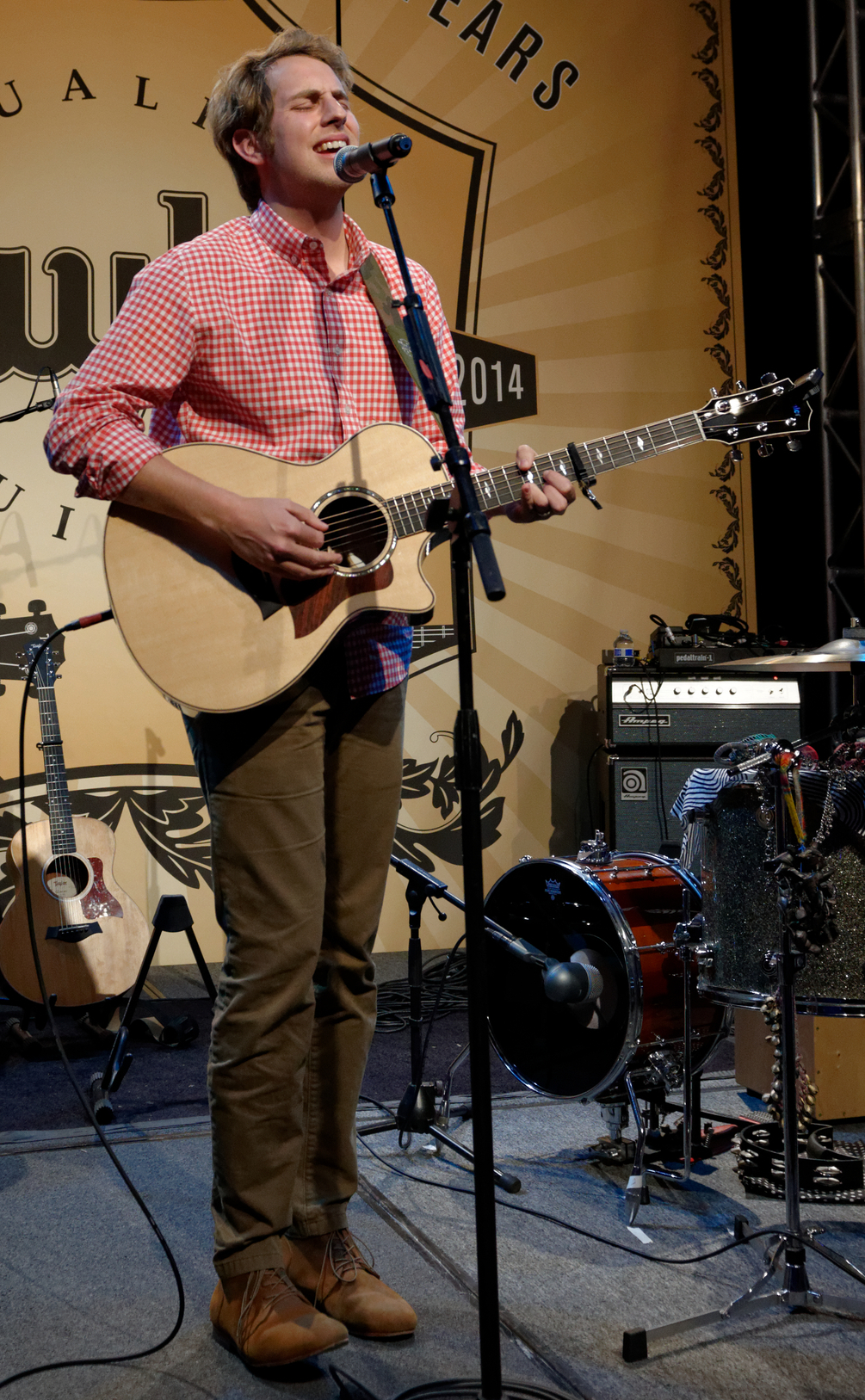
Rector performing in 2014

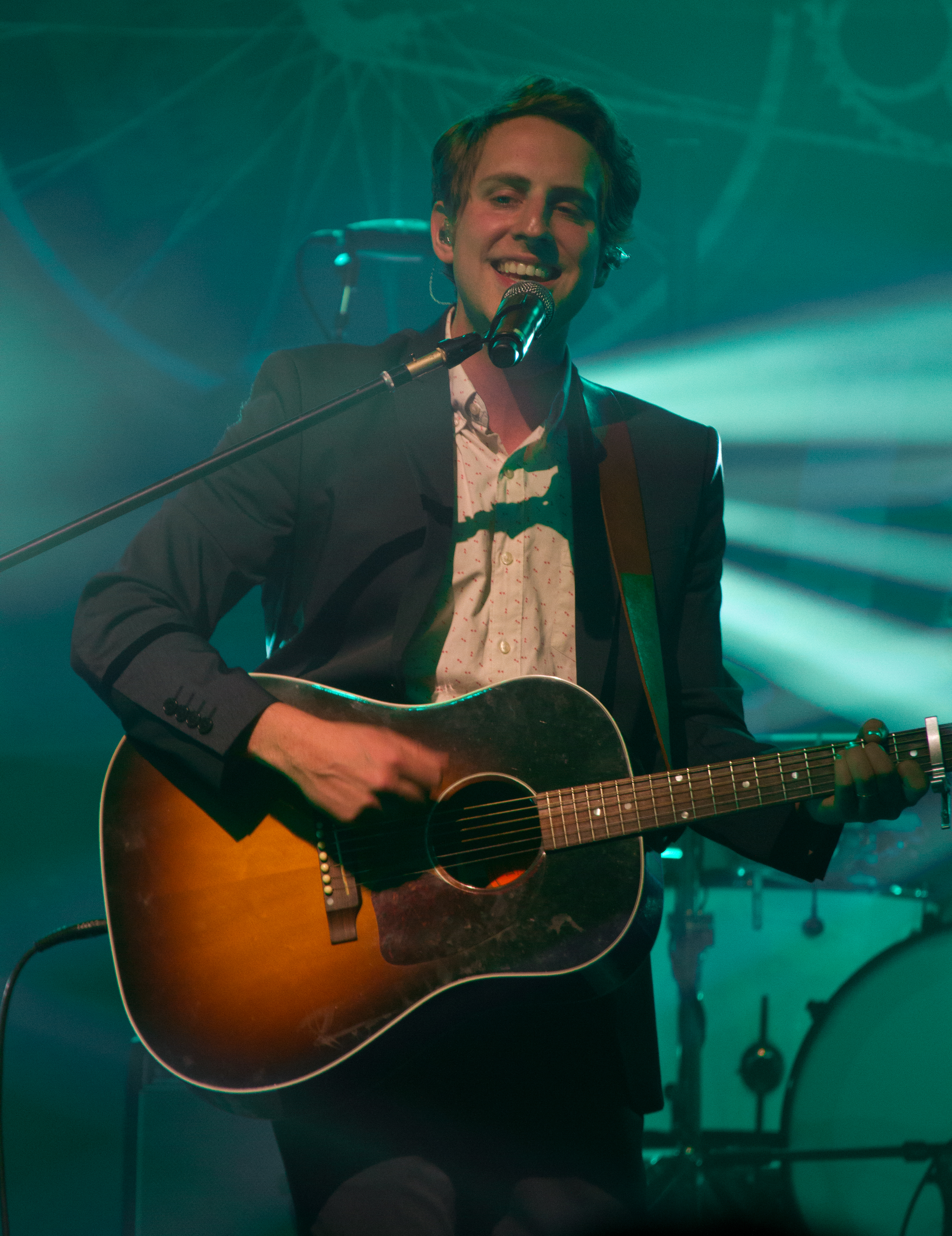
Rector performing in 2016

Rector toured with Needtobreathe, Drew Holcomb and the Neighbors, and Colony House for the first leg of the "Tour De Compadres" tour in early 2015.

Rector released his sixth studio album, Brand New, on August 28, 2015, via Aptly Named Recordings. Brand New was notably successful for Rector, becoming his first album to enter the top 10 on the Billboard 200, with its lead single "Brand New" peaking at No. 89 on the Hot 100. "Brand New" was RIAA-certified gold in 2020, and certified platinum in 2023. To support the commercial success he would spend two years touring for the album. The first tour, The Brand New Tour, spanned two legs from 2015 to 2016. It was commercially successful, having 15 sold-out shows in the first leg and selling over 41,000 tickets. He followed the tour with The Biggest Tour I Have Done So Far Tour, aptly named, which featured an additional 20 dates and spanned the rest of 2016. Touring for Brand New was 73 performances in total.

In January 2016, he was picked as Elvis Duran's Artist of the Month and was featured on NBC's Today show where he performed "Brand New", which initially received airplay on SiriusXM's The Pulse in September 2015. He co-headlined The Rock Boat in 2017, and supported Tim McGraw and Faith Hill on their 2017 Soul2Soul Tour.

=== 2018–2021: Magic and A Ben Rector Christmas ===
On June 22, 2018, Rector released his seventh studio album, Magic, his first with his founded label OK Kid Recordings. Rector toured for Magic with Magic: The Tour, a headlining tour spanning 28 dates, beginning on September 19, 2018, to November 17, 2018. A second leg was performed that continued into mid 2019. A live album, Magic: Live From the USA, was recorded during Magic: The Tour in various locations and was released on June 21, 2019. Also in 2019, Rector was nominated for a Daytime Emmy Award for Best Performance for his appearance on Pickler and Ben in 2018.

Rector announced The Old Friends Acoustic Tour featuring Cody Fry in late 2019. He began touring for the tour in February 2020; At the same time, the COVID-19 pandemic had become a national threat in the United States, and lockdowns had begun to take effect. He had flown to perform a show in Dallas, Texas, but was forced to return home. The first distributed project from this period was a single, "It Would Be You", written with John Fields and Jordy Searcy the day after returning home from the tour. In October 2020, Rector released an acoustic version of the song featuring Ingrid Michaelson. Throughout the pandemic, most of his next album would be rewritten from scratch.

In November 2020, Rector debuted “The Thanksgiving Song”, that celebrates the holiday Thanksgiving, alongside the release of his holiday album A Ben Rector Christmas, a collection covering six classic Christmas songs. The album was followed by an additional rendition of "Rudolph the Red-Nosed Reindeer" the next year. His next album was completed by December 2020, but he held off on releasing it until he could continue touring again. On May 21, 2021, he released the single "Range Rover", which features musician Steve Winwood playing the Hammond organ. Winwood is one of Rector’s musical heroes and was originally named in the song's lyrics before agreeing to take part in its composition as well.

=== 2022–2023: The Joy of Music ===
On March 11, 2022, Rector released his eighth studio album, The Joy of Music. The project features Snoop Dogg, Dave Koz, Kenny G, and Taylor Goldsmith and a short film created in conjunction with the record. In the film, Rector is led through seven songs from the album with associated cinematography by "Joy", a muppet monster created in collaboration with Jim Henson’s Creature Shop. Rector embarked on his headlining tour, The Joy of Music: Live Tour, in May 2022 with support from JP Saxe, Jake Scott, Jordy Searcy, and Stephen Day. A year later, on June 16, 2023, Ben released a 14-song live album ‘Live In Atlanta’ with songs heard and recorded on this tour.

Throughout 2023 and 2024, Rector resumed touring for The Old Friends Acoustic Tour, performing an additional 27 shows in 2023 and two more the following year. He continued his collaboration with Cody Fry, appearing with orchestras around the country including the National Symphony (conducted by Steven Reineke), the Nashville Symphony, the Pacific Symphony, the Dallas Symphony (conducted by Enrico Lopez-Yañez), the Minnesota Orchestra (conducted by Sarah Hicks), and the Cincinnati Pops, among others.

Since The Joy of Music Rector released several individual singles and collaborations. On August 5, 2022, Rector released "What Makes a Man", a single featuring Thomas Rhett, which discusses introspection relating to manliness and fatherhood. He performed the song as part of his Grand Ole Opry debut on August 9, 2022. In March 2023, he and country musician Terri Clark performed a duet for her song "Now That I Found You" for her album Take Two. On September 1, 2023, Rector collaborated with The Choir Room—a Nashville based choir collective—to release an alternate version of "Joy", which won a GMA Dove Award in July 2024.

=== 2024–present: The Richest Man in the World ===
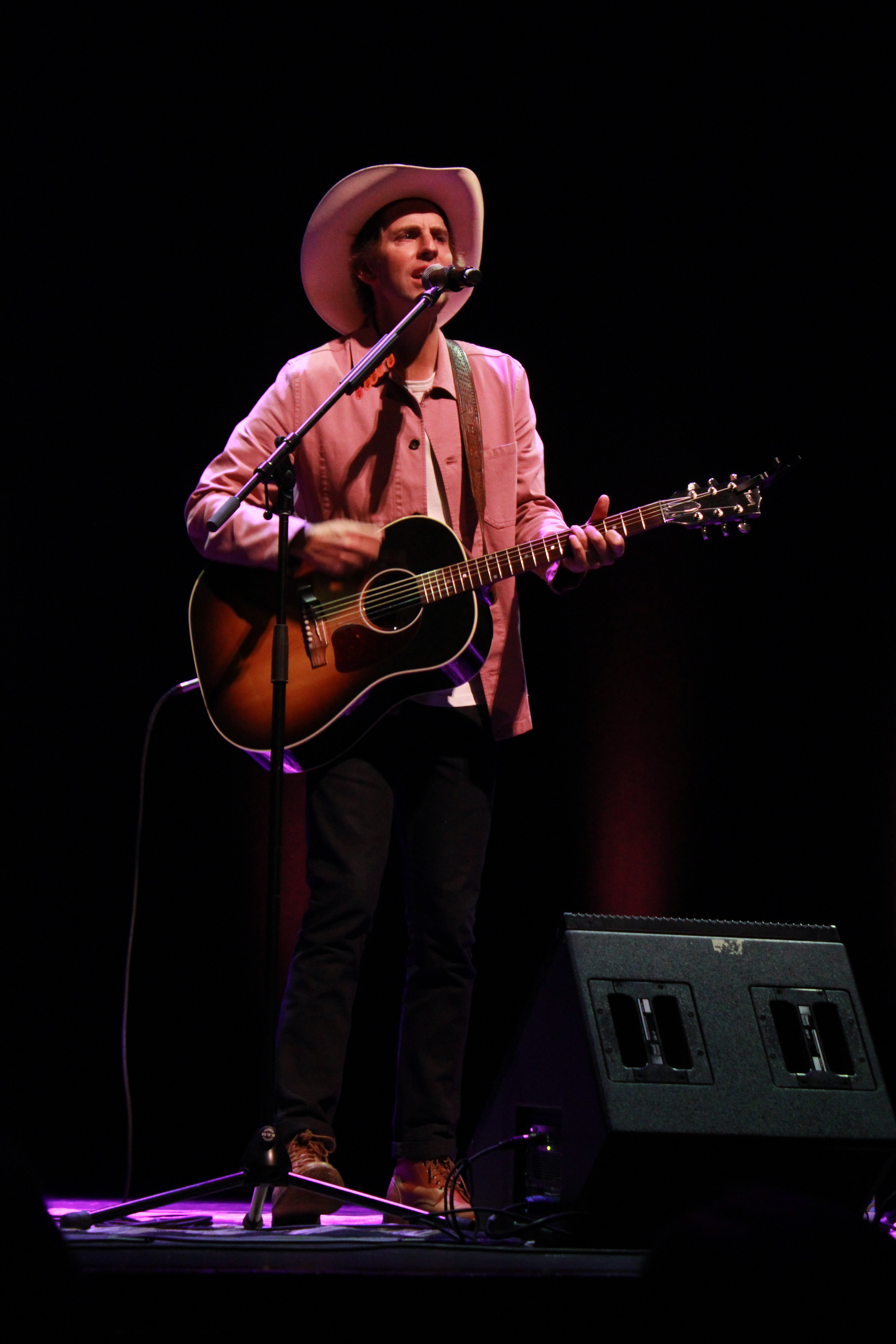
Rector performing in 2024

On February 2, 2024, Rector released a cover of "It's a Great Day to Be Alive" (originally by Darrell Scott and made famous by Travis Tritt), a song he played every show throughout the 2023 revival of The Old Friends Acoustic Tour. In March 2024 Rector released "Color Up My World" featuring country musician Hailey Whitters. Rector wrote the song knowing he and Whitters were scheduled to open for Dan + Shay in the spring of 2024 with their Heartbreak On the Map Tour, and the two would duet the song live throughout it; the song also received airplay on SiriusXM and The Bobby Bones Show. On July 12, 2024, Rector released ‘Wreck’, a contemplative song about the life-changing results and gratitude of having children.

Rector's latest album, The Richest Man in the World—dubbed by event officials as a "new era" in his music career—released on May 30, 2025. Three songs from the album were pre-released on November 15, 2024. An associated full band tour, The Richest Man in the World Tour, coincided with the album's release and spans 26 dates throughout 2025.

On September 19, 2025, Rector released the single “Not Afraid To Try”. On October 17, 2025, he released the single “This Town”. On December 5, as part of the release of the deluxe version of The Richest Man in the World, “Just Like That” was released.

== Artistry ==
=== Musical styles and themes ===
"Brand New"
A segment of Rector's song "Brand New", reflective of common themes among his music. A piano-driven pop song, it compares a true love to first-time feelings and carefree energy.

Rector's music is dominantly within the pop genre, typically blending additional themes of rock and folk music. Many of Rector's songs are piano-driven. Songs such as "Extraordinary Magic" and "Love Like This" are centered around the piano with orchestrated backing, while "Making Money" is exclusively raw piano. Various influences for his music style include but are not limited to James Taylor, Paul McCartney, Randy Newman, Huey Lewis and the News, and Steve Winwood.

Lyrics frequently discuss themes of love, faith, and personal assessment and growth. Songs about love describe those that are true and long-lasting; songs from The Walking in Between were described as "wedding standards" by The Washington Post. Most songs typically celebrate ordinary life over anything extraneous. "Crazy" from 2015's Brand New, for example, praises the "crazy normal" lifestyle of his ordinary life, such as spending a quiet night at home. These songs are usually influenced by his own marriage, and his children helped inspire songs discussing thoughts on fatherhood, as seen in "What Makes a Man". "Daughter" from The Joy of Music features an audible cameo from his then two-year old daughter, Jane.

Some songs are introspective, and reflect on past mindsets and personal assessment. "Peace" from Magic discusses finding peace through the life choices that have shaped him, rather than what's still yet to be achieved or never was. "The Men That Drive Me Places" reflects on how lucky he is to have found success in his career, but primarily focuses on glorifying the inspiring lives of individuals who have driven him to concerts. Other songs, such as "Sailboat", "30,000 Feet", and "Steady Love", contain general observations about self-worth and finding comfort in life.

=== Collaborations and contributors ===
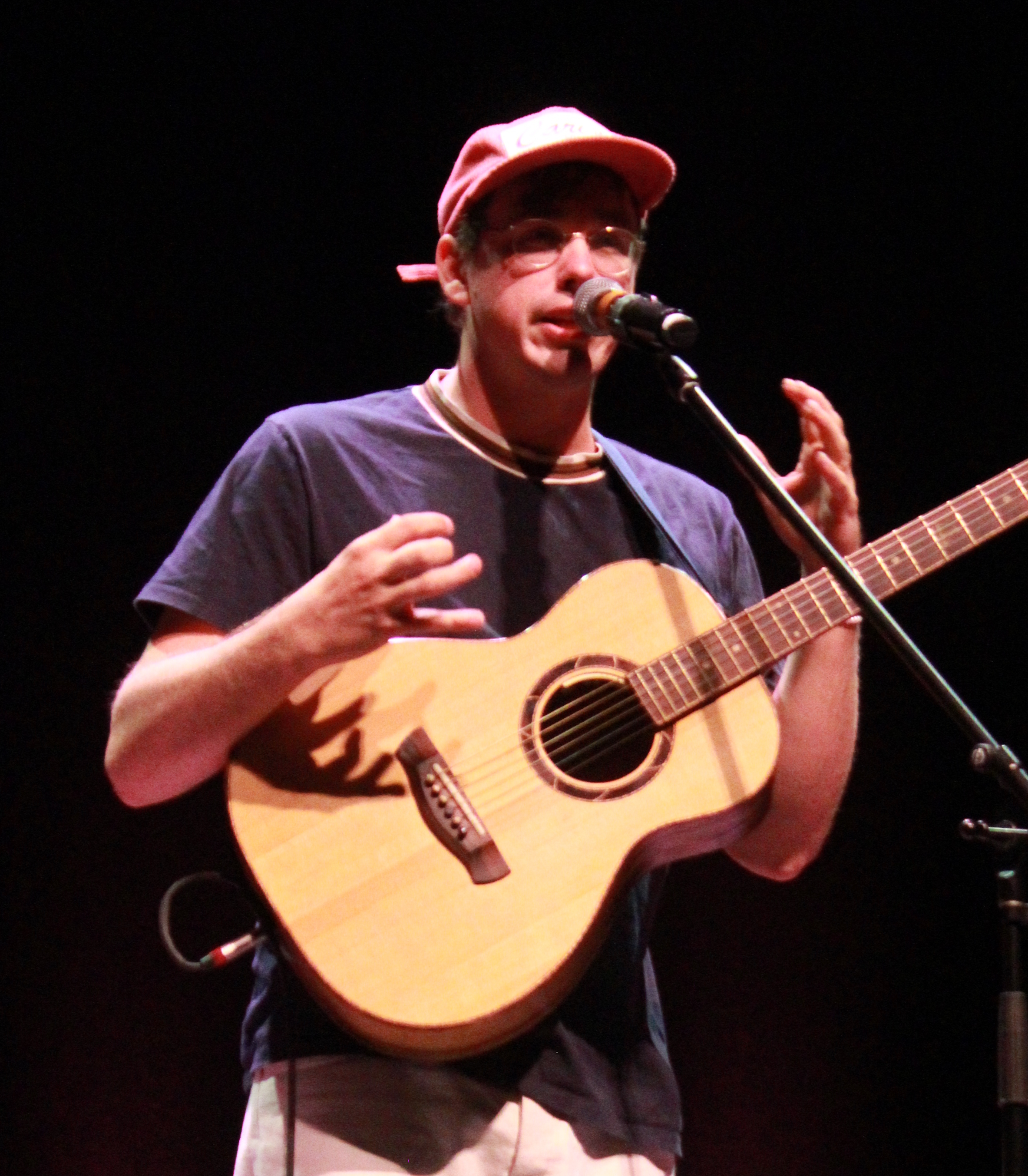
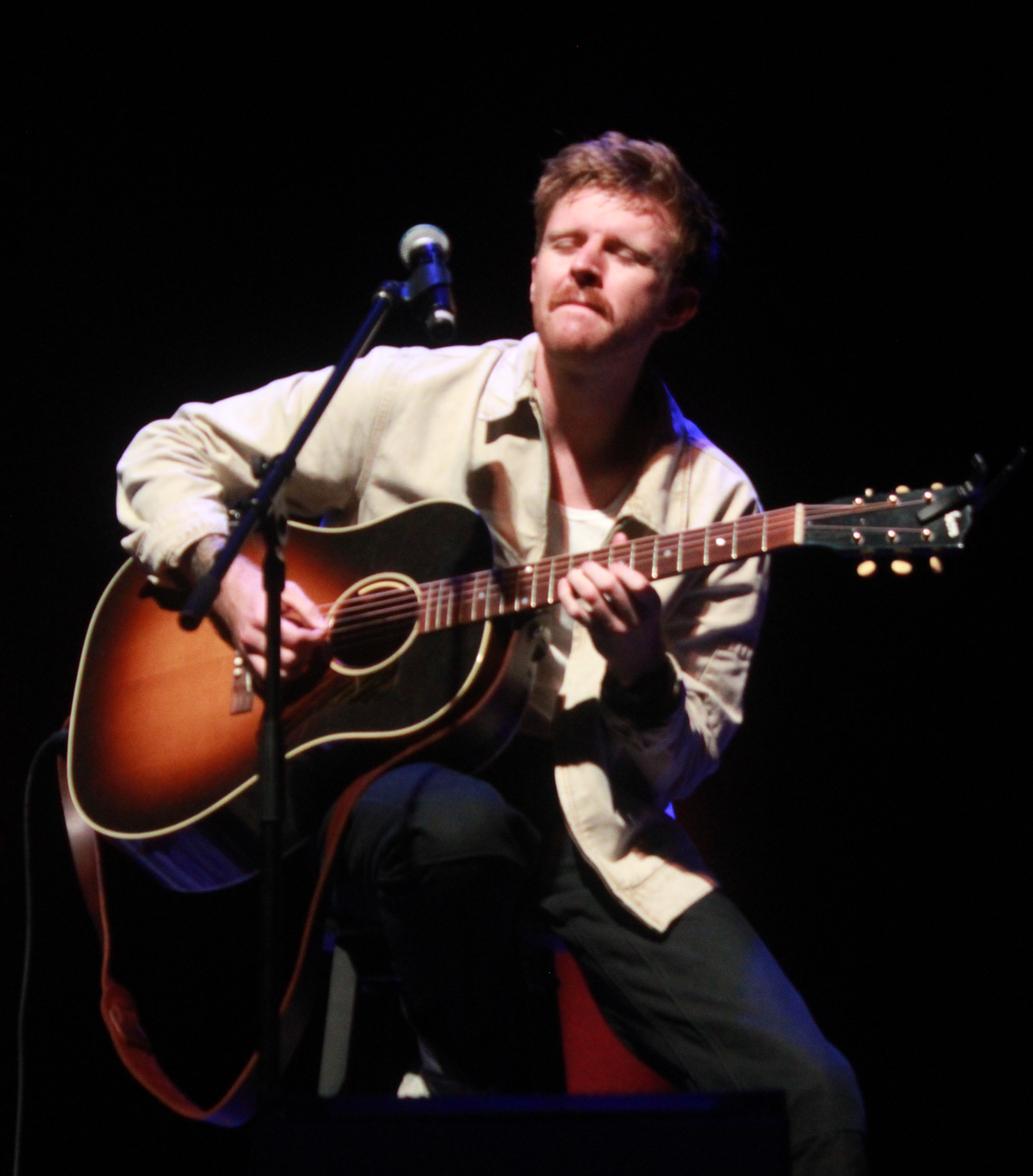
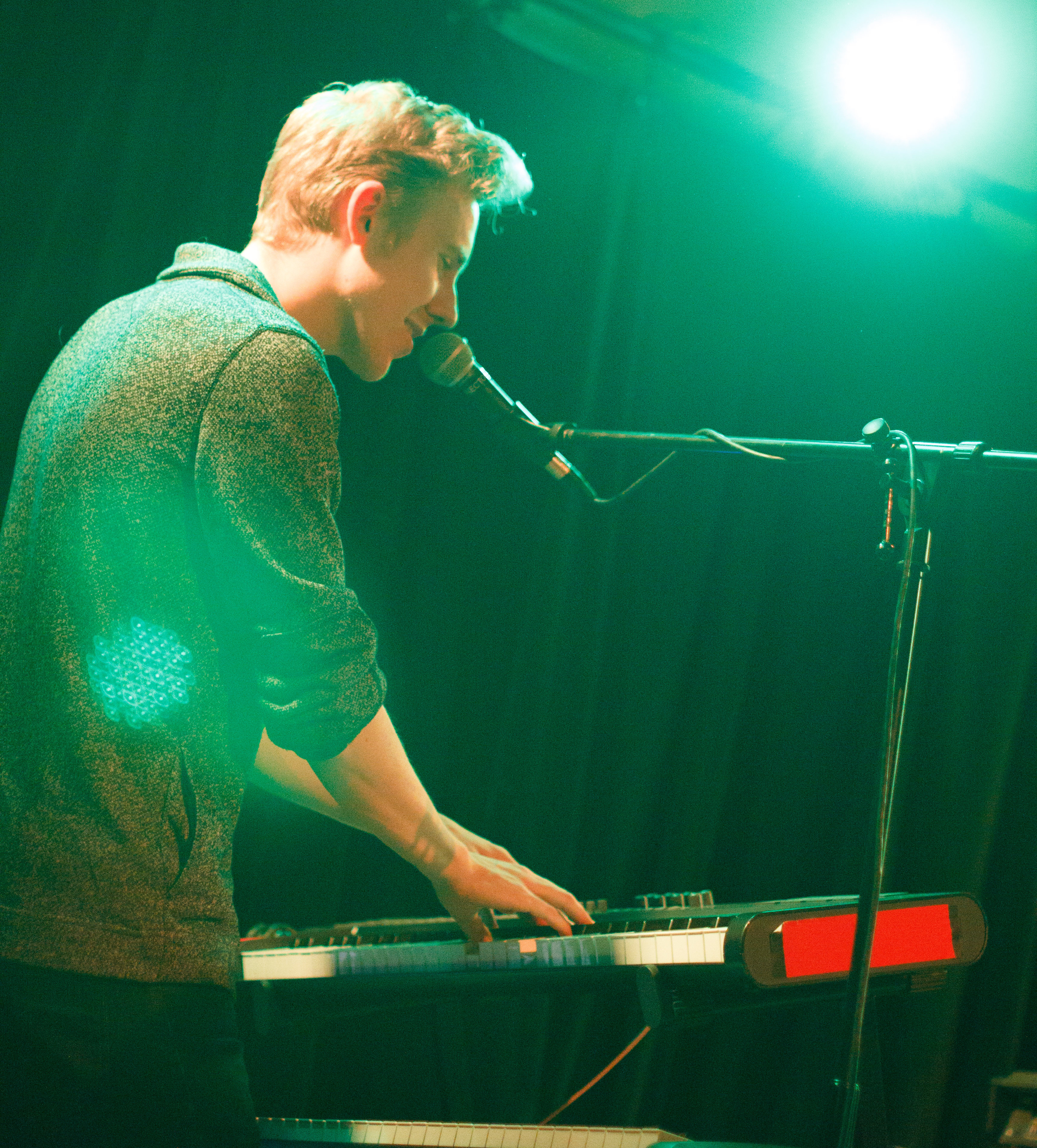
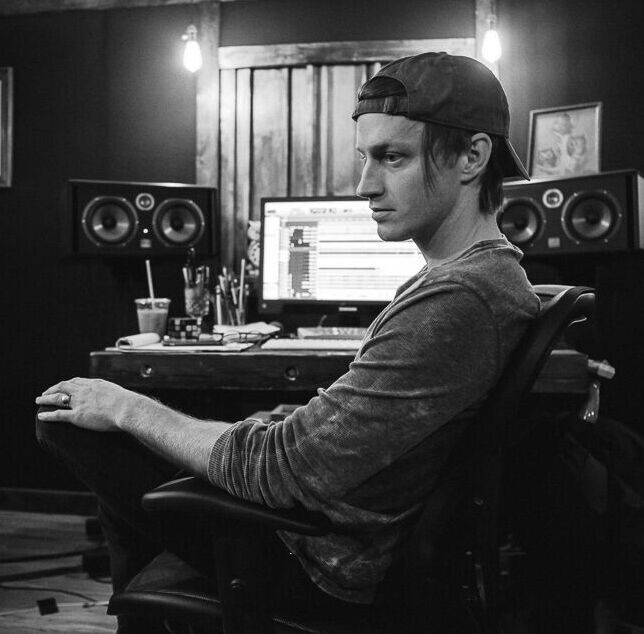
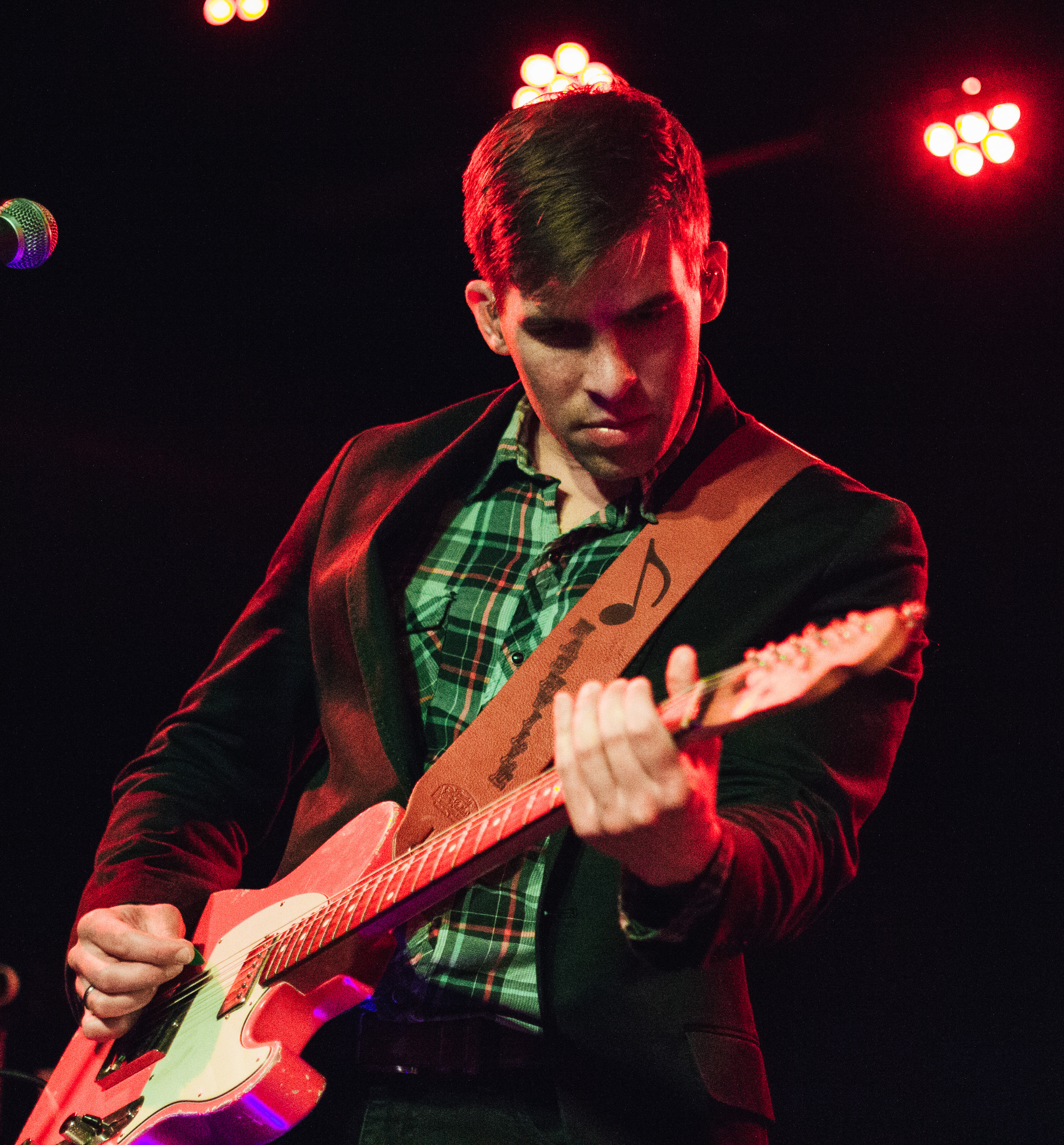
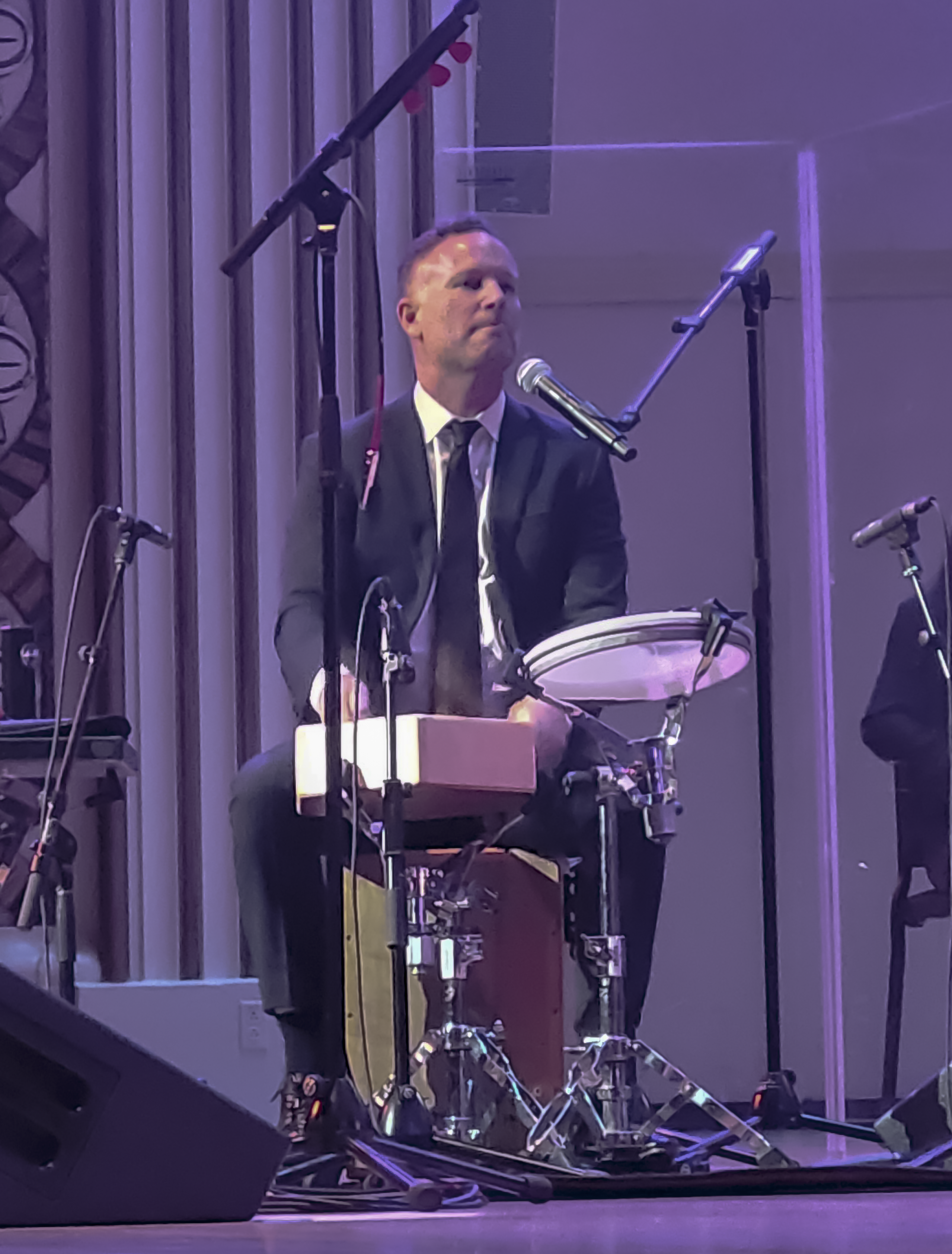
From left to right, top to bottom: Jordy Searcy, Austin Goodloe, Cody Fry, Chad Copelin, Nathan Dugger, and Jared Kneale are among the frequent collaborators to Rector's music.

Rector has released singles with featured artists including: "Color Up My World" with Hailey Whitters, "What Makes a Man" with Thomas Rhett, a stripped rendition of "It Would Be You" with Ingrid Michaelson, and Steve Winwood on hammond organ with "Range Rover". The Joy of Music features a more extensive lineup, including Snoop Dogg and Taylor Goldsmith of Dawes, and saxophone performances from Kenny G and Dave Koz. Rector has also been featured, and contributed to music, by Terri Clark, Christina Perri, Devin Dawson, and Cory Wong.

Rector does much production work, but works often in collaboration with producers such as John Fields and Chad Copelin. The Walking in Between featured Charlie Peacock, and Brand New included Ed Cash and David Hodges, among others. He has many recurring musicians to both his studio recordings and live performances, such as Cody Fry, Jordy Searcy, guitarists Austin Goodloe and Nathan Dugger of Drew Holcomb and the Neighbors, bassist Kevin Lee MacIntire, saxaphonist David Besonen, and drummers Steve Goold and Jared Kneale.

=== Television and sports credits ===
Rector made his television debut performing "Beautiful" on Jimmy Kimmel Live! on October 14, 2013. 2016 saw live performances on Conan, Live with Kelly and Ryan, and the Macy's Thanksgiving Day Parade on NBC. He has since also performed on Today, The Bobby Bones Show, Bachelor in Paradise, and Good Morning America. Rector's performance of "Old Friends" on Pickler & Ben in 2019 was nominated for a Daytime Emmy in the Outstanding Musical Performance in a Daytime Program category. In 2021, Rector was a mentor for two contestants on season 19 of American Idol, alongside Ryan Tedder, Jason Aldean, and Jimmie Allen. He performed duets of two of his songs live on the show: "Love Like This" with Graham DeFranco and "Brand New" with Wyatt Pike.

Rector's music has been licensed in over 100 major movie, television, and ad placements. His songs have appeared on television shows including America's Got Talent, American Idol, Ellen DeGeneres Show, World of Dance, Heartland, Hawaii Five-O, Pretty Little Liars, and Castle. "Brand New" saw 40 major movie and television placements by 2019, and was one of the most licensed songs for film and television from 2015 to 2020; it was featured in trailers for Edge of Seventeen, The Croods: A New Age, Moana, a Weight Watchers campaign starring Oprah Winfrey, and on ads for the Olympics and the Major League Baseball World Series. Other notable usage of his music in ad campaigns include the Celebrity Cruises line, and the Volvo EX90 line of vehicles by Volvo Cars. Another track, “Dream On", served as the soundtrack and sole audio for the 2022 advertisement of The University of Arkansas—Rector's alma mater.

Rector's history of performing at sporting events include the 2017 Stanley Cup Finals, the 2021 USSF World Cup Qualifying Match, and the national anthem at the 2025 Western NBA Conference finals. The United States Soccer Federation partnered with Rector to feature his unreleased song “New Day” as the soundtrack to promotional content for the qualification matches for the 2022 FIFA World Cup. ESPN used four iterations of songs from The Joy of Music, the most prominent of which was the use of "Sunday", as the soundtrack to Sunday Night Baseball; his song "Kids" was also used prominently in advertisements for the MLB Little League Classic. Rector has spent significant time playing in and performing at PGA golf tournaments across the continent. Rector played in a celebrity bracket at the 2022 AT&T Pebble Beach Pro-Am, and the 2023 Pro-Am the following year. He also played at the BMW Charity Pro-Am in 2024.

=== Touring and live performances ===
Ben Rector has been touring actively since college; as he became an established artist, each album release was backed with a tour across the United States, beginning with the Good Time Tour in 2012. Rector tours nationwide with a full band. Outside of album-associated tours include The Old Friends Acoustic Tour, a stripped performance of his works spanning 33 dates, and co-headlining symphonic shows with Cody Fry, which featured orchestra renditions of some of his songs. Three live-recorded albums have been released: Live in Denver in 2014, Magic: Live From the USA in 2019, and Live from Atlanta in 2023.

Rector frequently sells out amphitheaters while on tour, such as the Kennedy Center for Performing Arts, the Ascend Amphitheater, and three consecutive nights at the Ryman Auditorium. The touring effort following the success of Brand New spanned 73 dates total across two years, including two legs with The Brand New Tour and an additional 20 show extension with The Biggest Tour I Have Done So Far Tour.

Opening acts for his shows include Jacob Whitesides, Tyrone Wells, The Band Camino, Jordy Searcy, Stephen Day, and most recently The National Parks and Mat Kearney. Rector himself has performed as an opening act for Needtobreathe and Dan + Shay, and Tim McGraw and Faith Hill for Soul2Soul: The World Tour in 2017.

Headlining

- Good Time Tour (2012)
- The Ben Rectour (2013); 32 shows
- The Walking In Between Tour (2014); 32 shows
- The Brand New Tour (2015-2016); 53 shows
- The Biggest Tour I Have Done So Far Tour (2016); 20 shows
- Magic: The Tour (2018); 54 shows
- The Old Friends Acoustic Tour (2020, 2023, 2024); 33 shows
- The Joy of Music Tour (2022); 21 shows
- The Richest Man in the World Tour (2025); 26 shows
- Symphonies Across America; 12 shows

Co-headline

- The Beat Lives Forever Tour (With Drew Holcomb and the Neighbors, 2010)
- Ben Rector and Cody Fry With the Nashville Symphony Orchestra (Cody Fry and the Nashville Symphony Orchestra, 2023, 2024)

Opening act

- Tour De Compadres (With Needtobreathe, 2015)
- Soul2Soul: The World Tour (With Tim McGraw and Faith Hill, 2017)
- The Heartbreak on the Map Tour (With Dan + Shay, 2024)
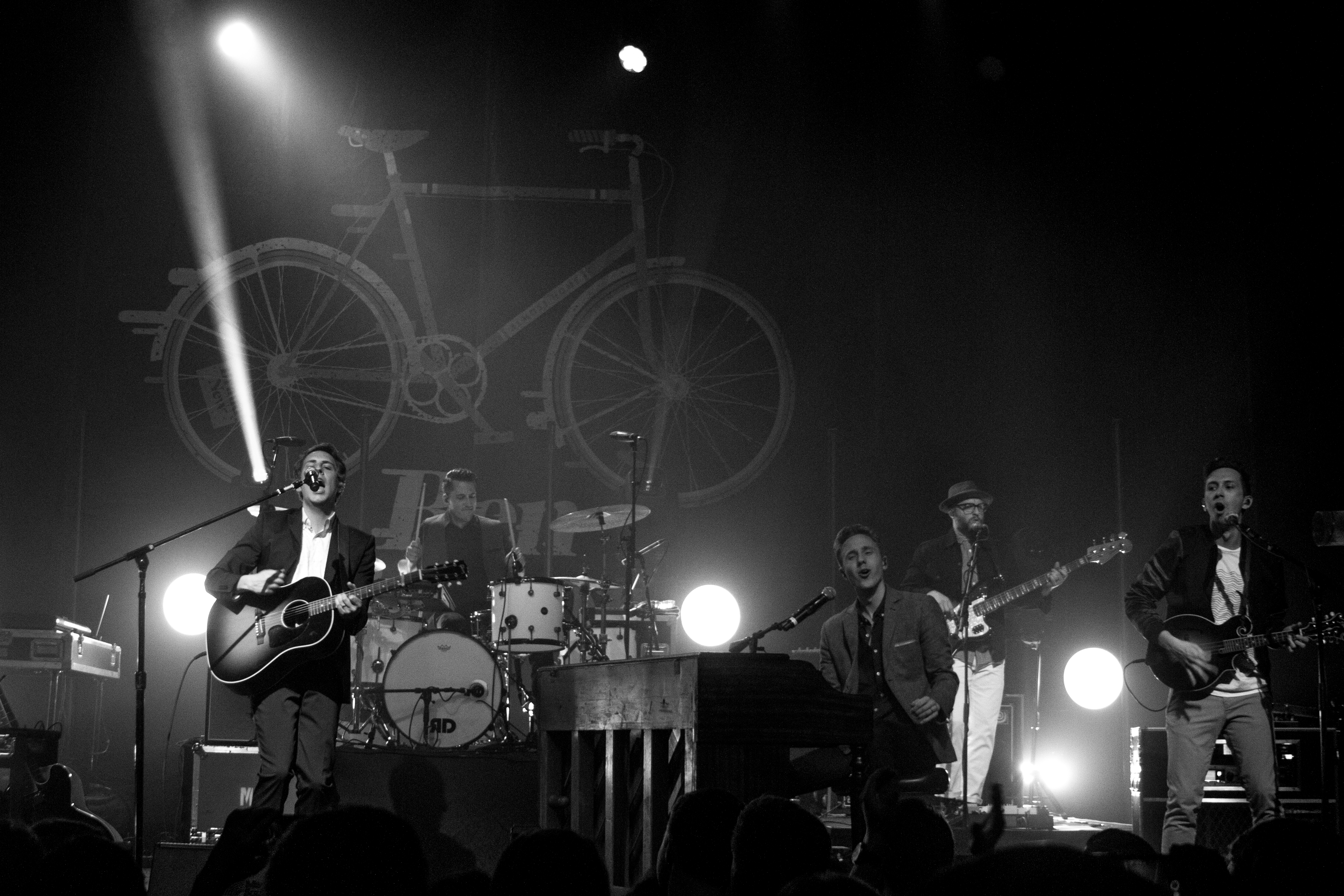
Rector (left) performing for The Brand New Tour, with Cody Fry (center) on piano and Cory Wong (right) on guitar

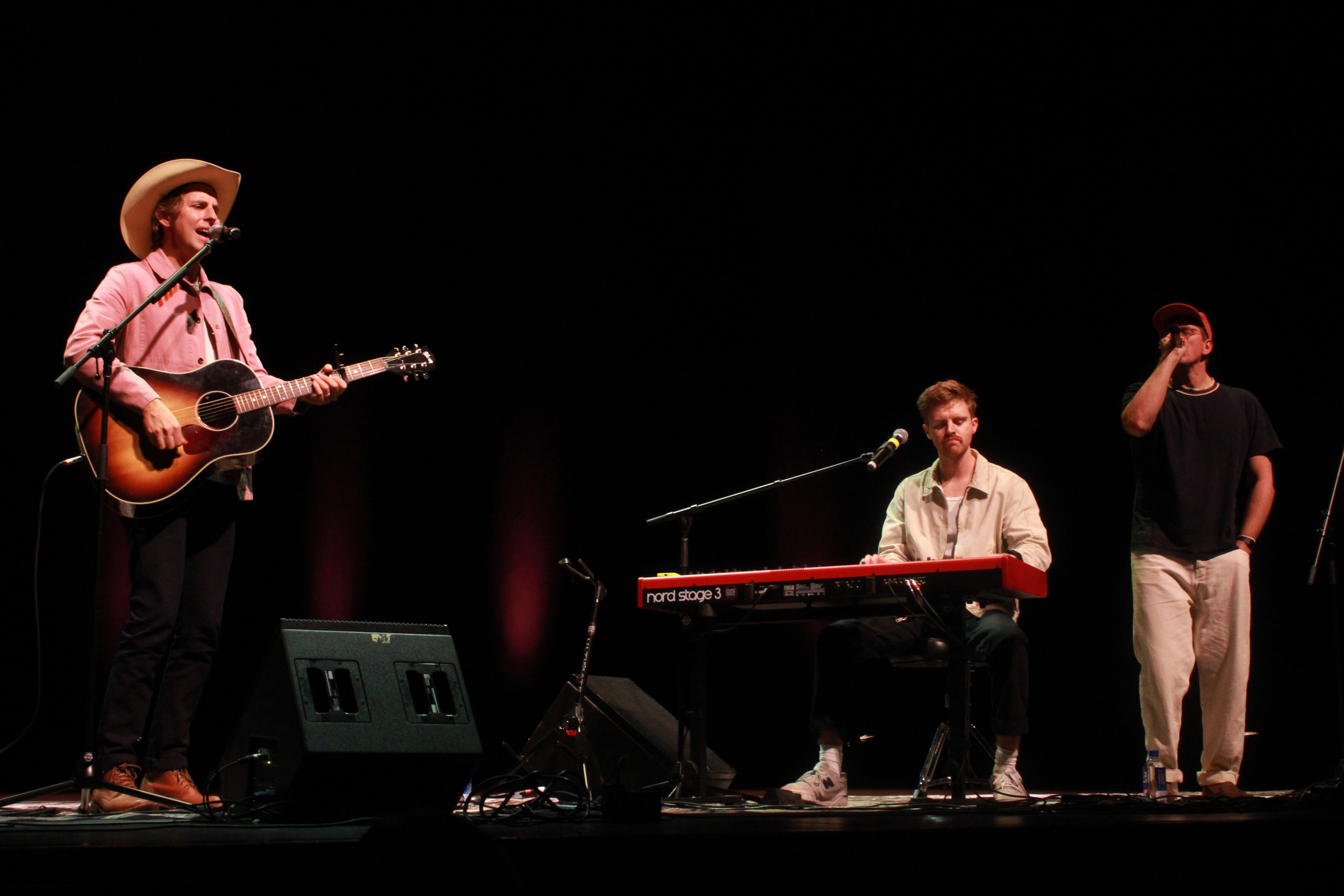
Rector (left) performing live for The Old Friends Acoustic Tour, with Austin Goodloe (center) and Jordy Searcy (right)

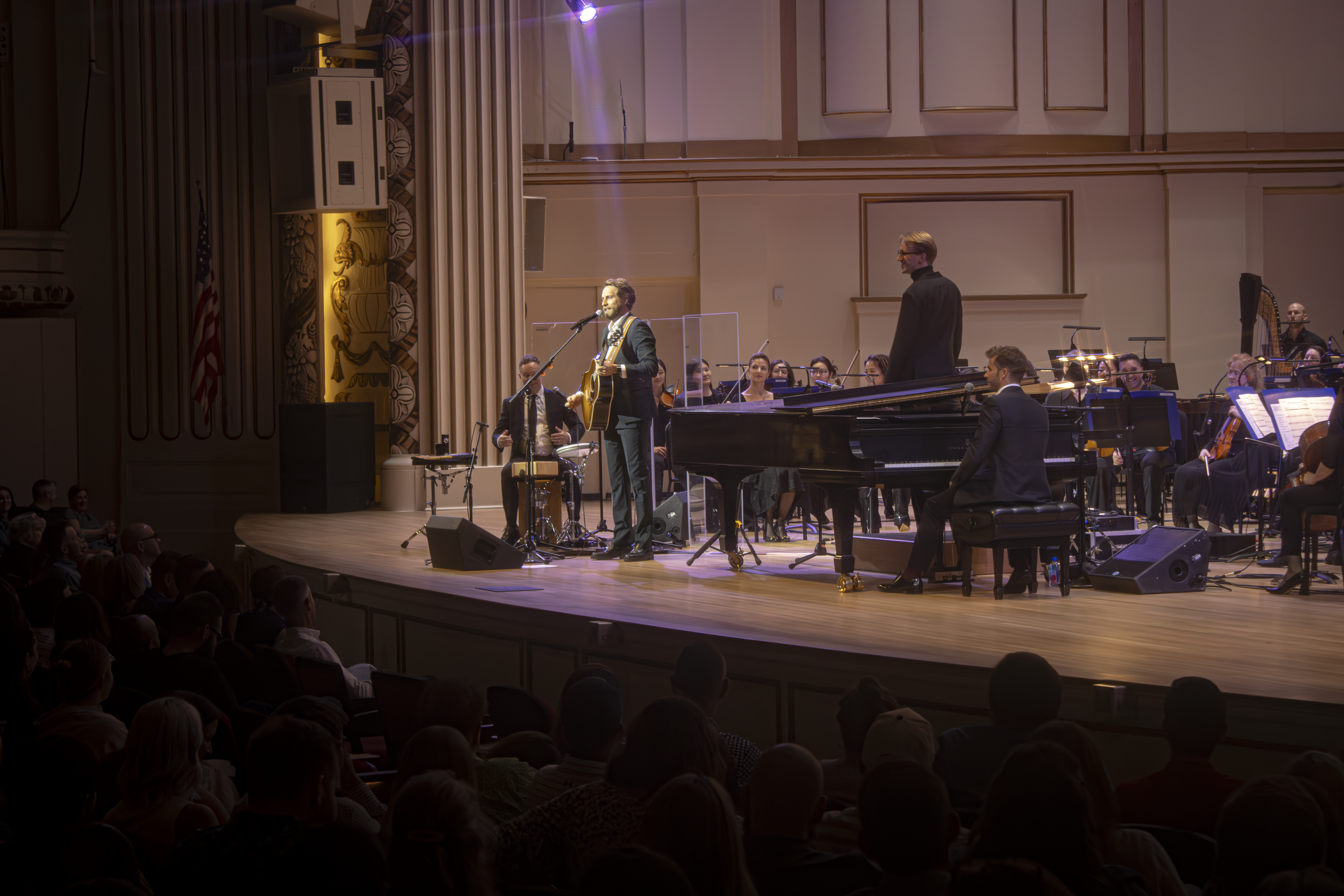
Rector performing live for the Symphonies Across America Tour, with Jon McLaughlin (seated at piano) and conductor Samuel Hollister (right)

== Discography ==
=== Studio albums ===
Studio album releases timeline Studio albums in bold
2006	Ben Rector
2007	**Twenty Tomorrow**
2008	**Songs That Duke Wrote**
2009	Jingles and Bells
2010	**Into the Morning**
2011	**Something Like This**
2012
2013	**The Walking in Between**
2014	Live in Denver, Newy Lewis and the Hues
2015	**Brand New**
2016
2017
2018	**Magic**
2019	Magic: Live in the USA
2020	**A Ben Rector Christmas**
2021
2022	**The Joy of Music**
2023	Live From Atlanta
2024
2025	**The Richest Man in the World**
2026	Live at The Delta Center

- **Twenty Tomorrow** (2007)
- **Songs That Duke Wrote** (2008)
- **Into the Morning** (2010):
  Into the Morning was Rector's first major release, peaking at No. 11 on the Billboard Top Heatseekers chart. The peaked also peaked at No. 5 on iTunes' pop chart and No. 10 on their album charts. Track 3, "When A Heart Breaks", was certified gold in 2019 by the RIAA.
- **Something Like This** (2011):
  Something Like This was Rector's first appearance on the Billboard 200. It debuted at No. 41 on both the Billboard 200 and Top Album Sales charts. It also debuted at No. 15 on the Top Rock Albums and Top Rock & Alternative Albums charts, No. 39 on Top Current Album Sales, and No. 11 on both the Independent Albums and Digital Albums charts. It charted at 1st on the Singer/Songwriter album chart on iTunes, 5 minutes after its release. It peaked 4th on iTunes overall.
- **The Walking in Between** (2013):
  The Walking in Between debuted at No. 16 on the Billboard 200, appearing on the chart for two weeks. It also debuted at No. 16 on the Top Album Sales chart, where it also remained for two weeks. It reached No. 2 on Billboard's Folk Albums chart and No. 5 on Top Rock Albums. It also debuted and peaked at No. 5 on Top Rock & Alternative Albums. It spent two weeks on the Top Current Album Sales and Independent Albums charts, debuting and peaking at No. 16 and No. 2 respectively. "Ordinary Love" peaked at No. 37 on the Hot Rock & Alternative Songs chart, No. 27 on Rock Digital Song Sales, and No. 37 on Hot Rock Songs in August 2013. The associated live album, Live in Denver, also charted. It appeared at No. 40 on the Top Rock Albums chart, No. 3 on the Americana/Folk Albums chart, and No. 40 on the Top Rock & Alternative Albums chart.
- **Brand New** (2015):
  Brand News is Rector's highest charting album to date. The album debuted No. 9 on the Billboard 200 chart, marking his first Top 10 album. It also debuted at No. 2 on the Billboard Top Current Rock Albums chart, No. 2 on the Billboard Album Core Genre Rock chart, No. 6 on the Billboard Album Sales chart, No. 3 on the Billboard Top Current Digital Album Sales chart, and No. 1 on the Billboard Top Folk Albums chart. "Brand New" was his first single to enter the Billboard Hot 100, peaking at No. 82. The song also reached No. 6 on the Billboard Adult Top 40, No. 7 on Hot Rock Songs, and No. 10 on the Adult Contemporary chart.
- **Magic** (2018):
  Magic debuted at No. 44 on Billboard 200, and No. 7 on both the Top Rock Albums and Top Rock & Alternative charts. It debuted and peaked at No. 10 on Top Album Sales and No. 7 on Top Current Album Sales. It debuted at No. 1 on Americana/Folk Albums, and No. 2 on Independent Albums, for 2 weeks each. "Drive" peaked on October 20, 2018 at No. 30 on Adult Pop Airplay, spending 11 consecutive weeks on the chart.
- **A Ben Rector Christmas** (2020)
- **The Joy of Music** (2022):
  The Joy of Music debuted at No. 189 on the Billboard 200 charts, and No. 17 in Top Album Sales in March 26, 2022. That same week, "Sunday" debuted at No. 41 on the Billboard Hot Christian Songs chart. "Thank You" debuted on the Billboard Christian Airplay chart on April 23, 2022, and remained on the chart for 19 weeks, peaking at No. 33 on May 28, 2022. The song also debuted on the Billboard Christian AC Airplay chart on June 4, 2022, remaining on the chart for 3 weeks and peaking at No. 27 on its debut week. As an independent artist, the album debuted at No. 30 on the Billboard Independent Albums chart. The vinyl version debuted at No. 21 on March 26, 2022.
- **The Richest Man in the World** (2025)

=== Live albums ===
- **Live in Denver** (2014)
- **Magic: Live from the USA** (2019)
- **Live from Atlanta** (2023)
- **Live at The Delta Center** (2026)

=== Extended plays ===
- **Ben Rector** (2006)
- **Jingles and Bells** (2009)
- **Newy Lewis and the Hues** (2014)

== Awards and nominations ==
Year	Award	Category	Result	Ref.
2009	Northwest Arkansas Music Award (NAMA)	Singer/songwriter Male	Won	
2019	Daytime Emmy Awards	Daytime Emmy Award for Outstanding Musical Performance in a Daytime Program – "Old Friends"	Nominated	
2024	GMA Dove Awards	Short Form Music Video of the Year (Performance) - "Joy (The Choir Room Version)"	Won	
