= Into the Morning =

Studio album by Ben Rector
- Released: February 16, 2010
- Length: 37:32
- Label: Aptly Named
- Producer: Chad Copelin

Ben Rector chronology
Songs That Duke Wrote (2008)	Into the Morning (2010)	Something Like This (2011)

Into the Morning is the third full-length studio album released by Ben Rector.

Into the Morning peaked at No. 11 on the Billboard Top Heatseekers chart.

== Background and release ==
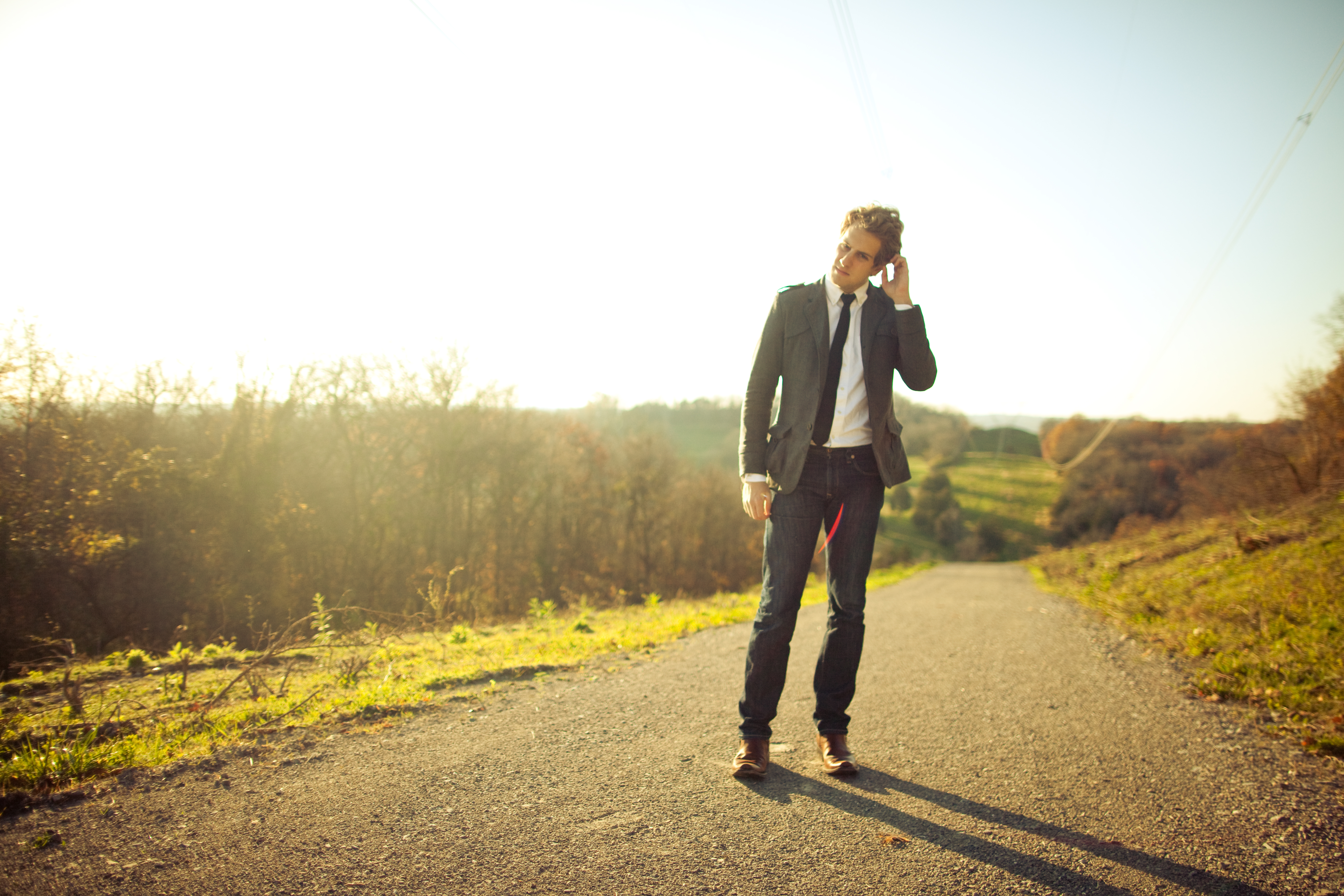
Ben Rector posing for the album artwork in 2010

Ben Rector considers Into the Morning to be his first "real" album, as he considers the two albums prior to be indirectly focused efforts while he was still in college. It was the first album where he began to "get in the groove as a songwriter", having focused his efforts more specifically toward the craft and writing music more frequently and with intention. The album was produced by Rector and Chad Copelin.

Into the Morning released on February 16, 2010. At the time he was a senior in college. It was made free via NoiseTrade. At a 2023 Q&A session during The Old Friends Acoustic Tour, Rector said Into the Morning was his favorite album to make when asked.

== Track listing ==
Into the Morning track listing
No.	Title	Length
1.	"The Beat"	3:37
2.	"Loving You is Easy"	3:09
3.	"When a Heart Breaks"	4:14
4.	"White Dress"	3:53
5.	"Out of My Head"	3:19
6.	"Autumn"	3:31
7.	"Moving Backwards"	3:10
8.	"When I Get There"	3:46
9.	"And Then You Love Someone"	3:52
10.	"Dance With Me Baby"	5:00
Total length:		37:51

== Commercial performance ==
Into the Morning was Rector's first major release, peaking at No. 11 on the Billboard Top Heatseekers chart. The album peaked at number 5 at iTunes' pop chart and number 10 on the iTunes album charts.

== Charts ==
Chart (2010)	Peak position
US Independent Albums (Billboard)	39
US Heatseekers Albums (Billboard)	11
