= Magic (Ben Rector album) =

Studio album by Ben Rector
- Released: June 22, 2018
- Genre: Pop rock
- Length: 44:39
- Label: OK Kid
- Producer: Ben Rector; Tony Hoffer; John Fields; Chad Copelin; Jeff Pardo; Konrad Snyder

Ben Rector chronology
Brand New (2015)	Magic (2018)	A Ben Rector Christmas (2020)

Magic is the seventh studio album by American singer-songwriter Ben Rector, released on June 22, 2018 through OK Kid Recordings. Rector co-produced the album alongside Tony Hoffer, John Fields, Chad Copelin, Jeff Pardo, and Konrad Snyder. It was the longest gap between one of Rector's releases due to the success of the previous album, Brand New. After completing tours for Brand New Rector found time to reminisce on the progress of his music career, being overwhelmed by feelings of nostalgia. Themes of nostalgia and reminiscing would, as a result, be the theme of Magic.

Influences on the album include memories of old friends and the birth of his first child Jane. Rector also collaborated on individual songs with David Hodges, Gabe Dixon, Steve Stevens, Dan Wilson, and Cody Fry. To promote the album he would release music videos for the songs "Drive" and "Old Friends", hold two live tours, Magic: The Tour and The Old Friends Acoustic Tour, and be the subject of the documentary Magic: The Tour by filmmaker Luke Menard. The album was a commercial success, peaking at #1 on the Billboard Americana/Folk Albums chart and #44 on the Billboard 200, among other Billboard charts.

== Background and production ==
Rector was too busy to focus his attention directly on his next album following Brand New in 2015; the album was amidst its circulation on radio, especially the single of the same name, reaching 41 million streams on Spotify, placing top 5 on the Hot AC radio chart and appearing in over 40 films and television shows. To support the album's success Rector was performing two separate headline tours. He began writing the new music after the tours, and recorded the album over a six month period. It was the longest distance between one of Rector's albums. Studio sessions included Blackwatch Studios in Norman, Oklahoma, Creation Audio-Studio B in Minneapolis, Minnesota, Columbia Studio B (the "Quonset hut studio") and SeeMore Sound in Nashville, Tennessee, and Sterloid Studio and The Hobby Shop in Los Angeles, California. The album was co-produced by Rector alongside John Fields and Tony Hoffer.

The album discusses themes of nostalgia and reminiscing on the past, and the "magic" in reflecting on memories. When planning his next album he was unsure what to write about and what themes it would cover. Having some breathing room in his schedule he found a moment to reflect on his life. He realized that he was in a "dead sprint since college"—he released three albums and one EP in his college years—and he was no longer in that phase of his life. Although he still considered himself young he found the feeling of nostalgia overwhelming, which inspired him to make it the theme of his album. The birth of his first child Jane would also influence the themes on the album.

"Extraordinary Magic" was derived from an original draft by Ben Shive, who sent him a version of the song and requested he sing it. Rector loved the song and included it on the album. The biggest change was switching the lyrics and title from "Ordinary Magic", a song about finding the beauty in the mundane, to "Extraordinary Magic", because he believed the song had the feel of an animated movie, similar to the works of Pixar. Rector credits "98 percent" of the work on the song to Shive.

"Old Friends" is a reflective piece recognizing childhood friends and citing personal memories. He was inspired to write "Old Friends" from a conversation with his mother about keeping in touch with friends from high school. Towards the end of the call she said, "You know what they say, you can’t make old friends", reminding him of many childhood memories and prompting him to write the song. The instrumentation of "I Will Always Be Yours" was derived from music by Huey Lewis and the News, which Rector is a fan of; it also included a guitar solo performed by guitarist Steve Stevens. He co-wrote "Duo" in Nashville, Tennessee with musicians David Hodges and Gabe Dixon. Close friends with the two, he recalled the song "just came out" over the course of an afternoon. "Sometimes" was co-written with musician, singer, songwriter, and visual artist Dan Wilson. Composer and producer Cody Fry would provide additional string orchestration.

== Promotion and release ==
"Music videos for me have always been not my favorite thing. They are super expensive, and it's very hard to do one, I think, that people really love and it actually adds something to the song and isn't just like you looking cool in the convertible like a cool guy. [...] So for this one, part of it was just like, 'Oh, I personally just want to get together with my old band and see them and be in Oklahoma.'"

— Ben Rector on the music video for "Old Friends", 2019 The Oklahoman interview

Rector released three tracks, "I Will Always Be Yours", "Old Friends", and "Drive", as singles ahead of the album on May 18. He released a music video for "Old Friends" on June 8, 2018, as well as a music video for "Drive". The music video depicts Rector performing the song with the members of his high school band Euromart, inside the garage of his childhood home in Tulsa, Oklahoma. The music video was Rector's favorite to film; although he doesn't enjoy making music videos, he did this simply out of personal interest to reunite with his old friends. The full album released June 22, 2018. The cover art depicts him floating in the air holding a Juno keyboard; this was difficult due to the keyboard's weight, and many photos were taken and unused since appeared close to the ground. A promotional live tour, Magic: The Tour, was held starting September 19, 2018, spanning 28 shows with opening performances by The Band Camino. The first performance was at the Orpheum Theatre in Memphis, Tennessee. Various venues sold out, especially at the Ryman Auditorium in Nashville, seeing Rector perform three back-to-back shows. In January 2019 he released "MPLS Magic (MPLS Version)", a three-single remake of three songs on the album with Minneapolis instrumentation. He would continue touring for the album from 2019 to 2020 with The Old Friends Acoustic Tour, but was cancelled due to enforced lockdowns amidst the COVID-19 pandemic.

Rector was the subject of the documentary Magic: The Tour by filmmaker Luke Menard, depicting what the tour was like for Rector. A fan of Rector's music and aspiring to make a documentary about a tour, he reached out to Rector via Twitter with a roughly 90 second demonstration video of what the cinematography would look like. The demonstration depicted Luke's brother Adam Menard as a stand-in for Rector, wearing a shirt that read "Fake Ben". It caught the attention of Rector, calling it "genuinely incredible" and that his "name is currently at the top of the list" if videography was necessary. About five months later Menard made another video demonstration in attempt to get his attention before his fall semester started; Rector agreed, resulting in Menard pulling out of his fall semester at Purdue University one day before it began. He would later film various aspects of the tour in the summer, including backstage preparation, downtime, and interviews with the band. The short film released May 13, 2019.

== Commercial performance ==
Magic appeared on many Billboard charts. The album debuted and peaked at 44 on Billboard 200, and 7 on both Top Rock Albums and Top Rock & Alternative. It debuted and peaked at 10 on Top Album Sales and 7 on Top Current Album Sales. It debuted at number 1 on Americana/Folk Albums, and number 2 on Independent Albums, for 2 weeks each. "Drive" peaked on October 20, 2018 at 30 on Adult Pop Airplay, spending 11 weeks straight on the chart.

== Track listing ==
Magic track listing
No.	Title	Writer(s)	Length
1.	"Extraordinary Magic"	Rector, Ben Shive	2:53
2.	"I Will Always Be Yours"	Rector, Jeff Pardo	3:46
3.	"Drive"	Rector, Pardo	3:17
4.	"Old Friends"		3:44
5.	"Duo"	Rector, David Hodges, Gabe Dixon	3:22
6.	"Kids"	Rector, Marc Scibilia	4:17
7.	"Green"	Rector, Joseph Patton, Josh Gabbard	3:43
8.	"Sometimes"	Rector, Dan Wilson	3:23
9.	"Wherever You Are"	Rector, Pardo	3:17
10.	"Over and Over"	Rector, Pardo	3:24
11.	"Boxes"		3:22
12.	"Peace"		2:36
13.	"Love Like This"	Rector, Pardo	3:35
Total length:			44:39

== Charts ==
Chart performance for Magic
Chart (2018)	Peak position
US Billboard 200	44
US Folk Albums (Billboard)	1
US Top Rock Albums (Billboard)	7
US Top Album Sales (Billboard)	10
US Top Current Album Sales (Billboard)	7
US Independent Albums (Billboard)	2
