= Old Friends (Ben Rector song) =

Single by Ben Rector

from the album Magic
- Released: May 18, 2018
- Genre: Pop rock
- Length: 3:44
- Label: OK Kid
- Songwriter(s): Ben Rector
- Producer(s): Ben Rector; Tony Hoffer; John Fields; Chad Copelin; Jeff Pardo; Konrad Snyder

Music video
- "Old Friends" on YouTube

"Old Friends" is a 2018 song by American singer-songwriter Ben Rector. It released as a single alongside "I Will Always Be Yours" on May 18, 2018, and is the fourth song on Rector's seventh studio album Magic, released on June 22, 2018 via OK Kid Recordings. The song is a reflective piece reminiscing on old friends and memories. His live performance of the song on Pickler and Ben was nominated for a Daytime Emmy.

Rector was one part of the band Euromart in high school, one of his earliest musical experiences; the band consisted of Rector, Chris Wylie, Blake Studdard, Matt Wantland, and Austin Helm. Much later, inspired by a discussion with his mother about keeping up with old friends from high school, he would write "Old Friends" while being "flooded" with old memories and feelings of nostalgia. The associated music video for the song saw Euromart reunited, performing the song in Rector's childhood home in Tulsa, Oklahoma, released on June 8, 2018. "Old Friends" would be performed live and included in live albums from touring for Magic and later The Joy of Music, and is the namesake of The Old Friends Acoustic Tour, where it was also performed.

== Background ==
=== Euromart ===
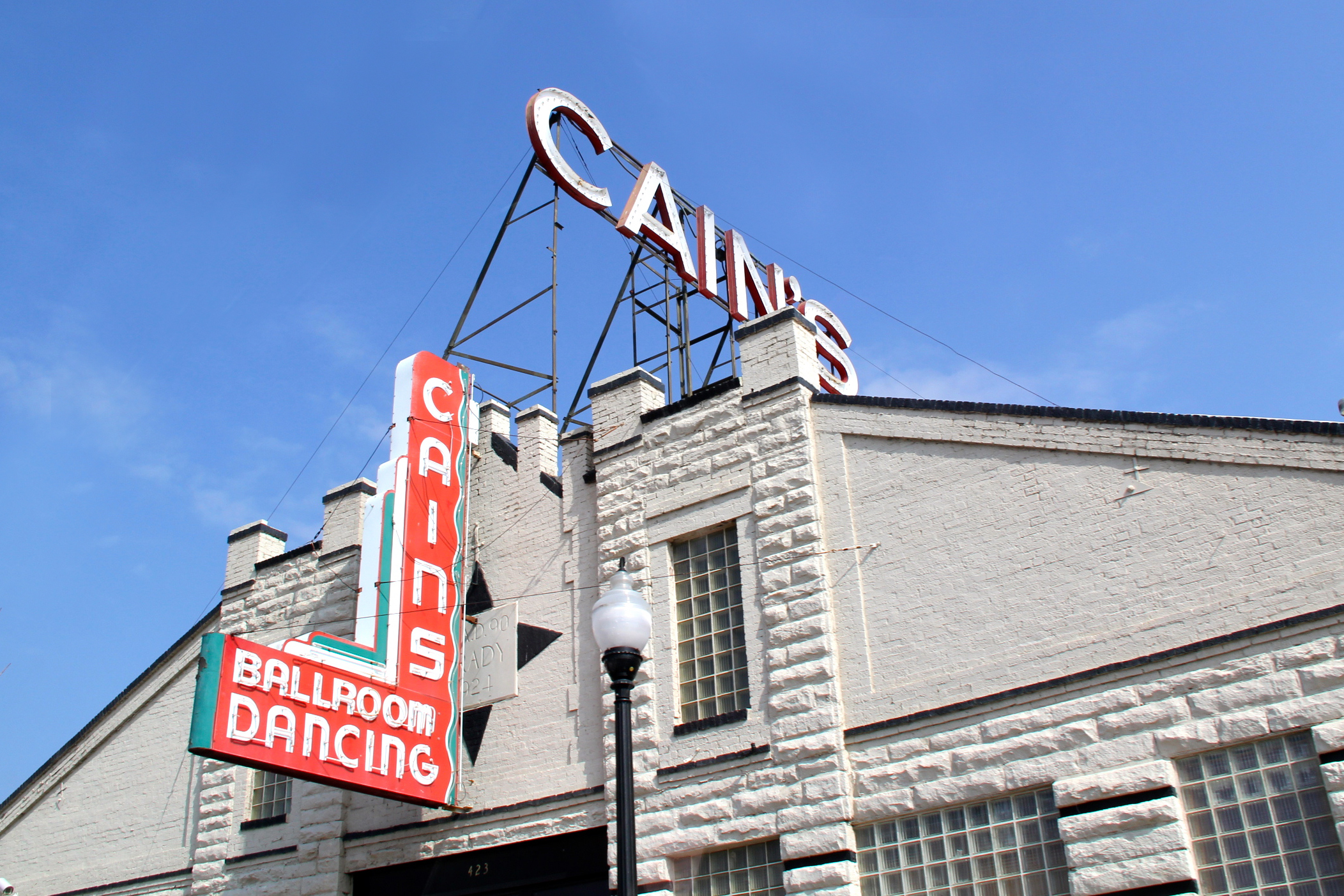
Cain's Ballroom

In high school, Ben Rector was a part of a four-piece band during his attendance at the Metro Christian Academy in Tulsa, Oklahoma, Rector's home town. The band, Euromart, (Note: Earliest mentions of the band refer to the name as Euro-Mart, although it's referred to as Euromart in retrospect.) consisted of Rector on guitar and vocals, drummer Chris Wylie, bassist Matt Wantland, and guitarist Austin Helm. Rector, Wylie, and Wantland were 18 and attended Metro Christian Academy; Helm was 17 and attended Union High School. All four were seniors. Although not present at their first performance at a Battle of the Bands concert, Blake Studdard was also a part of the band on piano. At the time Rector was also performing as a solo act. All four of the members had been playing their instruments for multiple years, and formed a band together to compete in a Battle of the Bands competition held by Tulsa World magazine. The unique opportunity was the incentive to participate. They had two practice sessions hosted in Wylie's game room where they recorded two songs: "Rome" and "Answers". During a lunch session they came across a store titled "Euro-Mart", a store that sold imported goods from Europe, and also where they "met a really nice Ukrainian guy with a beard, a leisure suit, everything" according to Wylie. They found the experience fascinating and decided to name the band after the store.

The Battle of the Bands was held on February 12, 2005 at Cain's Ballroom. 47 bands participated and Euromart was selected to be among the seven finalists to perform. Wantland, who was not at the lunch session where the name Euromart was coined, was unaware the band was his own when asked if it was. Tulsa World specified Euromart had "a strong fan presence" at the event and noted that "Rector even managed to mix things up by dropping the guitar and jumping on the piano, an obvious crowd pleaser." Euromart did not place; Xanadu, Three Godfathers, and Stoneface Norman were judged to be the top three, and Xanadu won both the grand prize and the People's Choice award. In retrospect Rector could recall specifics about Xanadu's performance and looks on it fondly.

The appearance at the event resulted in the band's recognition throughout the town, and they would record an extended play (EP) and continue to perform shows in Tulsa until the end of the school year. Following one more performance, the band separated when the members began attending college. Rector would continue writing music and performing during his attendance at the University of Arkansas.

=== Concept and composition ===
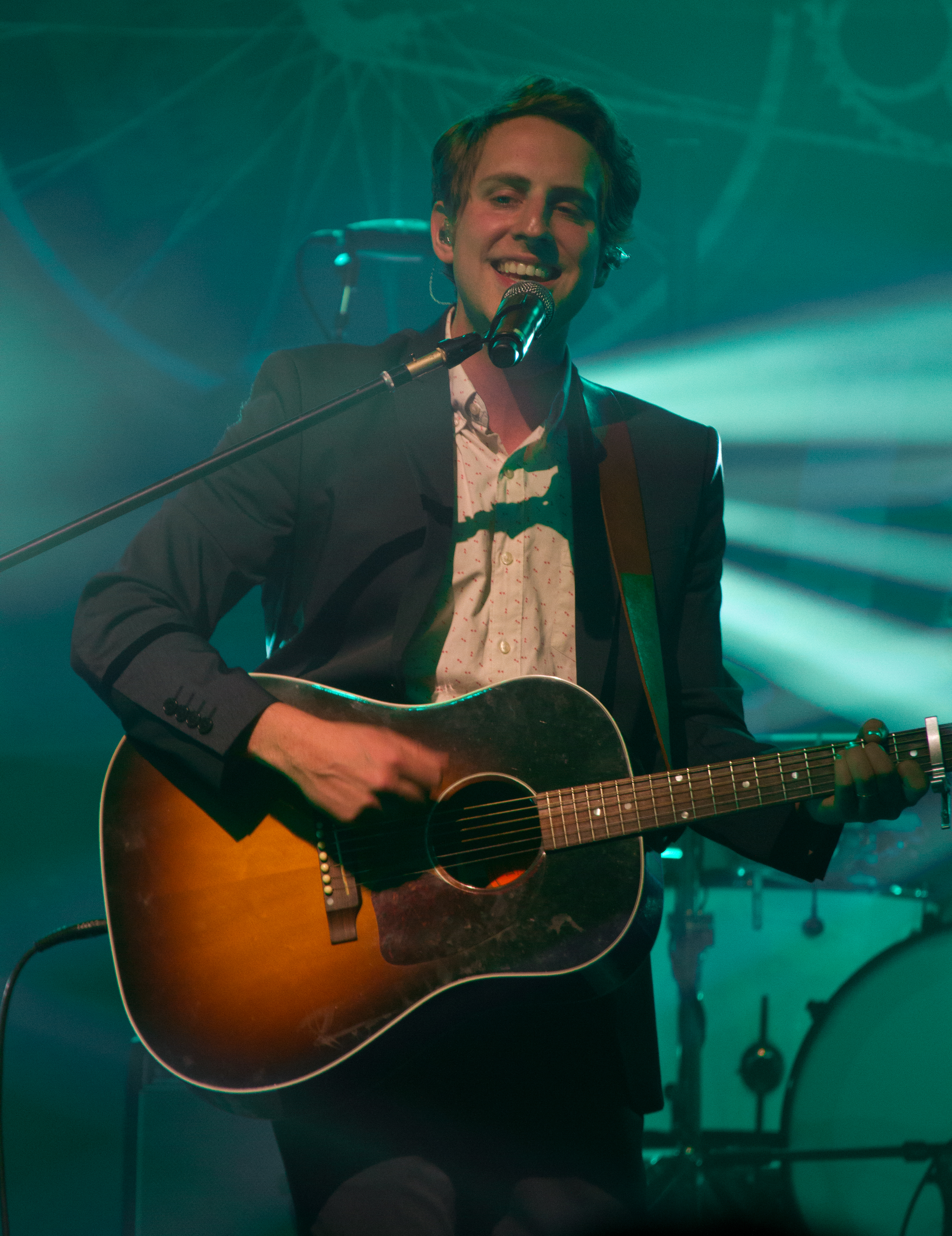
Ben Rector in 2016

Rector penned "Old Friends" after a conversation with his mother, Bette Rector. The conversation was about the importance of keeping up with one of Rector's best friends from high school, and his mother closed with saying "you know what they say, you can’t make old friends". It inspired Rector to immediately sit down and begin writing the song, and was "flooded" with feelings of nostalgia and recalled memories from growing up. He missed both the feeling of childhood naivety as and the childhood friends he grew up with, and got emotional writing the song. Although Rector noted that his feelings toward old friends might have been different had he not moved from Tulsa to Nashville, Tennessee, he explained that "it’s hard to replicate the relationships with people that have known you your whole life". It was a song he felt he could not write until recently, a point where he was truly an adult and reminiscing on the past.

"Old Friends" is in the key of A-flat major, and uses a syncopation method that is driven by a full-time pattern but invokes the feeling of a half-time rhythm. The lyrics of the song mention several memories of Rector with his childhood friends. For example, he mentions Wylie and Studdard, and noted memories of listening to Jimmy Eat World in Studdard's bench seat car. The album from which "Old Friends" appears, Magic, discusses themes of reminiscing and nostalgia, and Rector felt the song was a good introduction to the album. Rector hopes the song inspires people to call their old friends. The song is piano-driven.

== Release ==
In May 2018, Rector announced that his seventh studio album Magic would release on June 22. Ahead of the album Rector released two tracks, "I Will Always Be Yours" and "Old Friends", on May 18. "Old Friends" premiered via Billboard. Rector returned to Tulsa November 10, 2018, to perform a show at the Tulsa Theater, and felt pressure while performing because some people in the audience knew him personally from his past. He was excited to sing the song on tour. "Old Friends" was performed in his future touring efforts for Magic and The Joy of Music, and included on their respective live recording albums, Magic: Live from the USA and Live from Atlanta. Rector's acoustic tour, The Old Friends Acoustic Tour, is also named after the song; the song was performed at the tour as a mashup with "Forever Young" by Alphaville.

=== Music video ===
The band members of Euromart performing in the music video. From left to right: Matt Wantland, Blake Studdard, Chris Wylie, Austin Helm, and Ben Rector.

A music video for "Old Friends" released on June 8, 2018. The music video is one moving shot of Rector performing alongside the band members of Euromart, in the garage of his childhood home in Tulsa. His parents had moved out since then, and it was the first time Euromart performed together in 13 years. The recording was done in about 3 to 4 takes; one of the recordings was faulty because the spring on the camera stabilizer broke and the shot turned sideways. As the takes progressed, people in the neighborhood began to hear and notice the film crew and began gathering to spectate.

In the music video was additional details about Rector's childhood and friendships. Displayed on the screen is a first-name list of women Wylie once dated; Rector insisted the list be included in the video, and Wylie agreed, although he had second thoughts later. Other displayed text included a list of friends Rector has in the present day, followed by the same list asterisked of whether or not he's seen their parent's back porch. He discussed how to approach this list with his wife Hillary, and she compared inviting people to a birthday party, and he also made the list relatively small simply for the aesthetic. He originally had the list be three names long, but he felt people would misinterpret this as him only having three friends. The video closes with the text "now go call your old friends". Rector is typically not a fan of doing music videos; about the music video for "Old Friends", Rector said, "getting to film that with those guys in my parents’ house was the most fun I have ever had getting to make a video, and it was just so fun to see them again and kind of get to relive hanging out together and playing music together. That was just a joy. It was such a fun day."

== Awards and nominations ==
Year	Award	Category	Result	Ref.
2019	Daytime Emmy Awards	Daytime Emmy Award for Outstanding Musical Performance in a Daytime Program – "Old Friends"	Nominated	
