= Brand New (Ben Rector album) =

Studio album by Ben Rector
- Released: August 28, 2015
- Studio: Ed's (Franklin, Tennessee); The Smoakstack, St. Cecilia, Southern Ground Studios, Columbia Recording Studios and Fox Den Studios (Nashville, Tennessee)
- Genre: Pop
- Length: 43:15
- Label: Aptly Named
- Producer: Ben Rector; Ed Cash; Cason Cooley; Chad Copelin; David Hodges

Ben Rector chronology
The Walking in Between (2013)	Brand New (2015)	Magic (2018)

Singles from Brand New
- 1. "Brand New" Released: February 12, 2016

Brand New is the sixth studio album by Ben Rector. It was released on August 28, 2015. It is the second album he has released under his own record label, Aptly Named Recordings. The first single "Brand New" which was produced by Ed Cash & David Hodges, debuted at number 94 on the Billboard Hot 100 and then peaked at number 82.

== Background ==
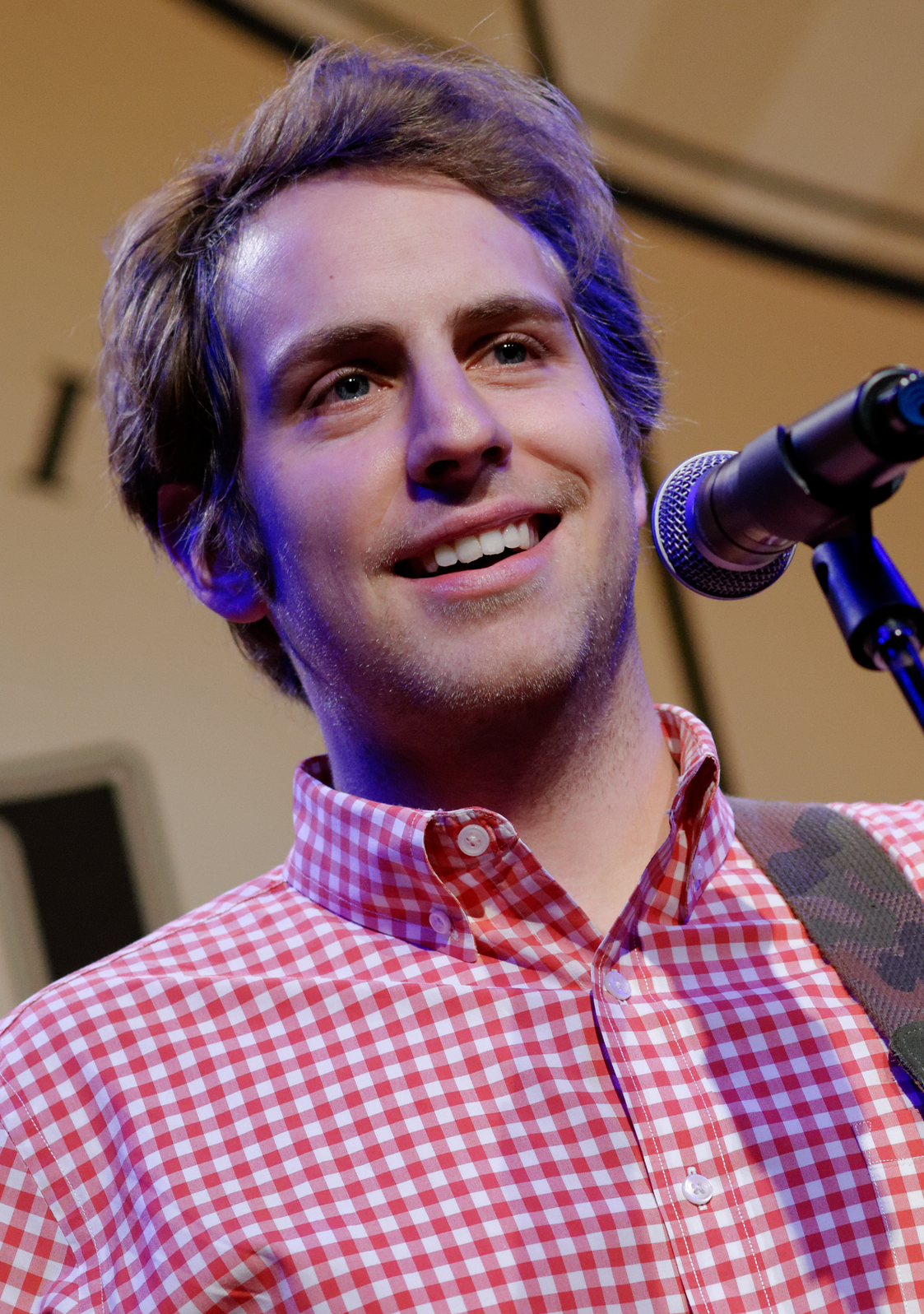
Rector in 2014

Having found a level of success in his music career, Rector described it as "a weird let-down". Throughout his college years he had been continuously pursuing music exclusively, and inspiration for songs was easy to come by since the experiences were all brand new to him. He wanted to return to feelings at the beginning of his career where he "just didn’t want to set a guitar down". Because of this, much of his efforts were focused directly on his next album, and stopped touring temporarily to do so. Rector made sure that every song on the album was a positive one, to reflect a similar feeling of naivety he felt when first making music. To do so, every song was "vibrant, life-giving, and just jumps out of the speakers".

== Production ==
=== Composition ===
Wanting to return to similar feelings of joy he found in music when he began his career, the album has an emphasis on music with high energy and passion. Knoxville News Sentinel described the composition of the songs as "an old fashioned adherence to short songs with strong hooks", reminiscent of music he listened to when he was young; the Star 103 radio station in Tulsa, Oklahoma that he grew up listening to frequently played music from the 1960s and 1970s. The majority of the album was recorded live in a studio to achieve a lively feel; according to Rector, "I didn't want to build something as much as I wanted to capture something". The album's single "Brand New" was written after the album had been written and recorded; he included it in the album since it felt to him like a "thesis statement" of the album's message.

=== Lyrics ===
"I think my heart in that song was that the more I talked to people like that I realized that for whatever reason I was dealt this hand for musical aptitude in a time when people think that's cool. I feel like what we celebrate is almost arbitrary, like celebrating people who are tall, and when I started talking to these drivers, I realized that they're brilliant. They are fascinating people, so hardworking with such little incentive and no one is cheering for them. And they should."

— Ben Rector on "The Men That Drive Me Places"

The songs discuss themes of the joys of youth, as well as introspective feelings from Rector, where he reflects on early stages of his career. Retrospective thoughts of his career, as well as feelings towards his wife Hillary of at the time seven years, would influence the lyrics of the songs.

"The Men That Drive Me Places" is a reflective piece that focuses attention on hard-working, average individuals who fulfill basic duties, specifically referencing two act drivers who had given a ride to Rector to venues. In the song he highlights these people and their personal lives, with a level of respect he is given as a musician. Both cab drivers mentioned, Howard and Danny, are real people, as well as the details about them mentioned in the song. Rector was inspired to write the song after his experience with Danny, who had driven him to a show in California, showing up "so professional and in such a good mood", 15 minutes early. The experience made him reflect on how lucky he was to find a lucrative career in music and to be celebrated for it.

== Promotion and release ==
=== Pre-release ===
Rector had the album distributed by a subsidiary of Capitol Records.

=== Post-release ===
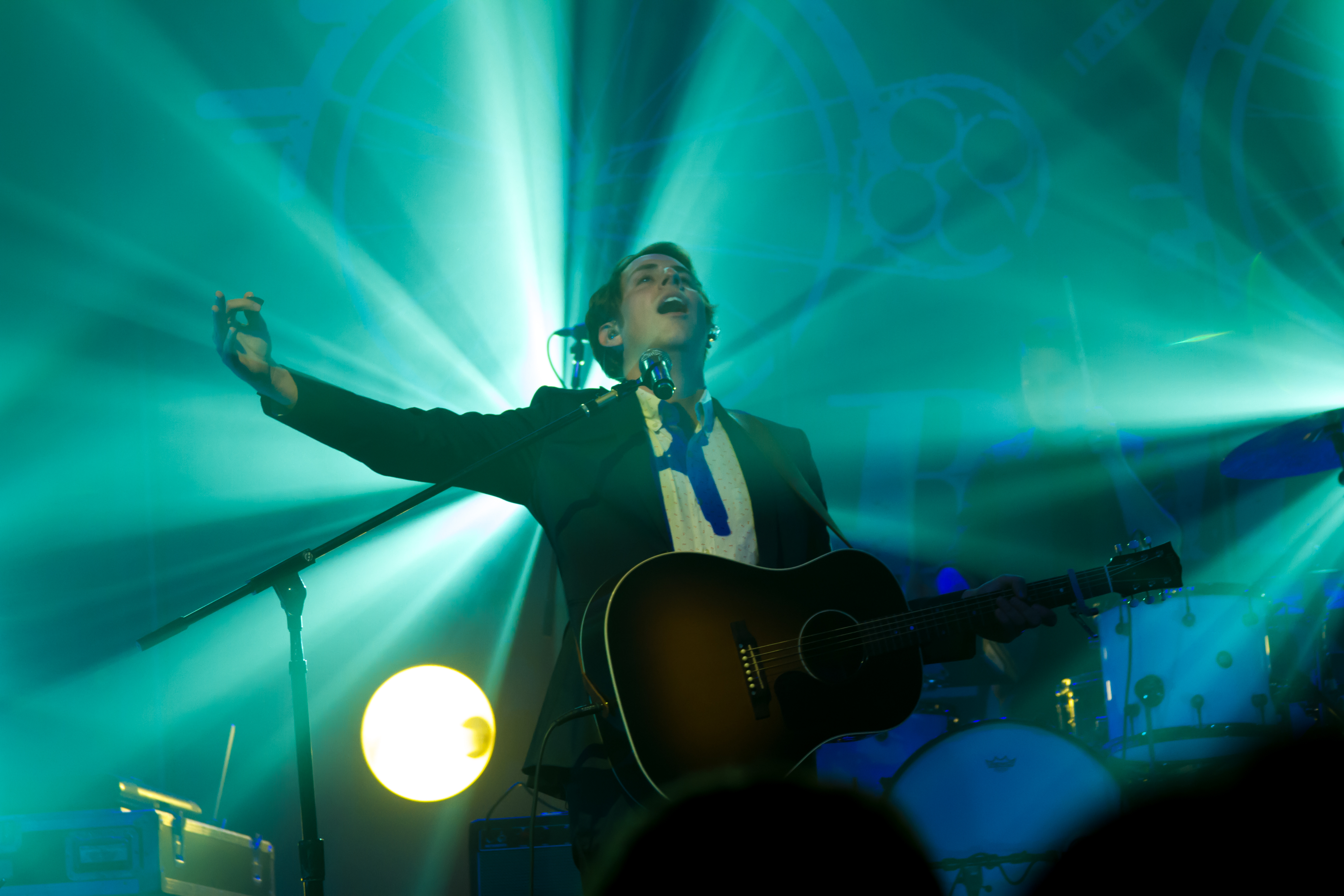
Rector performing live in 2016

Rector played "Brand New" on Today and at the 2016 Macy's Thanksgiving Day Parade. The latter performance saw a bump in the song's performance, rising on the Rock Digital Song Sales chart with 6,000 song downloads, an increase of 290 percent. "Brand New" would be used for the trailers of the 2016 coming-of-age comedy-drama film The Edge of Seventeen. In 2021 he performed "Brand New" with Utah singer Wyatt Pike during season 19 of American Idol. A fan of Rector, Pike opted out of performing his guitar so he could dance instead.

Reflecting on the success of the album, Rector found that he would usually "go back and forth" on being driven by both making good music and building a larger career. Following Brand New, he remarked that his increasing level of success and fame "...is never gonna make me happy...because there’s always gonna be someone else ahead of me." Despite this he stated that "I’m really happy where I’m at..." and credited his "pessimism" for keeping him grounded throughout his career.

== Track listing ==
All tracks are written by Ben Rector (except where noted).

No.	Title	Length
1.	"Make Something Beautiful"	1:33
2.	"Brand New" (Rector, David Hodges, Abe Stoklasa)	4:03
3.	"Paris"	3:07
4.	"Favorite Song" (Rector, Jess Cates)	3:40
5.	"The Men That Drive Me Places"	4:17
6.	"Fear"	3:26
7.	"Note to Self"	3:01
8.	"Like the World Is Going to End"	3:30
9.	"Crazy" (Rector, Matthew Thiessen, Emily Wright)	4:09
10.	"Almost Home"	4:27
11.	"30,000 Feet" (Rector, Jeff Pardo)	4:16
12.	"More Like Love"	3:46
Total length:		43:15

== Personnel ==
- Ben Rector – vocals, acoustic piano (1, 2, 4–6, 8–12), arrangements (1), backing vocals (2–4, 6, 8, 9), keyboards (2, 11), acoustic guitar (2, 3, 7, 10), mandolin (2, 6, 10), handclaps (2), classical guitar (3), electric guitar (4, 6, 10), organ (7), programming (11), banjo (11), bass (11)
- Jared Fox – computer programming (1)
- Ed Cash – programming (2, 8), electric guitar (2–5, 8), backing vocals (2), acoustic guitar (3), keyboards (8)
- David Hodges – programming (2), bass (2)
- Chad Copelin – organ (2), programming (4, 5), bass (4, 5)
- Ben Shive – keyboards (3, 8), programming (3, 8), organ (3), bass (8)
- Matt Stanfield – keyboards (6, 7, 10), acoustic piano (7), programming (10)
- Cason Cooley – keyboards (6, 9, 10), programming (9, 10)
- Jeremy Lutito – programming (6, 9), drums (9)
- Hank Bentley – electric guitar (3, 5, 8)
- Nathan Dugger – electric guitar (6), guitars (10)
- Matt Pierson – bass (3, 6–10)
- Marc Scibilia – bass (9)
- Aaron Sterling – drums (2, 4, 5), programming (2)
- Jacob Schrodt – drums (3, 8, 11)
- Will Sayles – drums (6, 7, 9, 10)
- Cody Fry – string arrangements and conductor (1, 12)
- Melodie Morris – cello (1, 12)
- Cara Fox – cello (3)
- Kevin Sweers – cello (12)
- Rose Rodgers – viola (12)
- Avery Bright – violin (1, 12)
- Zach Casebolt – violin (1)
- Michael O'Gieblyn – violin (1, 12)
- Kyle Pudenz – violin (1, 12)

=== Production ===
- Ben Rector – producer (1, 4, 5, 11, 12)
- Chad Copelin – producer (1, 4, 5, 11, 12), engineer (1, 2, 4, 5, 11, 12), mixing (1, 5, 12)
- Ed Cash – producer (2–6, 8), engineer (2–5, 8)
- David Hodges – producer (2), engineer (2)
- Cason Cooley – producer (6, 7, 9, 10), engineer (6, 9, 10)
- Jared Fox – engineer (1, 3, 5, 11)
- Mike Janas – engineer (1)
- Aaron Sterling – engineer (2)
- Sean Moffitt – mixing (2, 6, 8, 9)
- Warren David – mixing (2, 6, 8, 9)
- Aaron Chafin – mixing (3, 4, 10, 11)
- Shane D. Wilson – mixing (3, 4, 10, 11)
- Buckley Miller – tracking (6, 9, 10)
- Mark Bengston – engineer (7), mixing (7)
- Steve Vealey – engineer (7), mixing (7)
- Brandon Bell – engineer (12)
- Chris Taylor – engineer (12)
- Michael H. Brauer – mixing (7)
- Joe LaPorta – mastering at Sterling Sound (New York, NY)
- Lani Crump – production coordinator (3, 10, 11)
- Clark Brewer – photography
- Joe Dicus – design
- Lauren Ledbetter – design, layout

== Charts ==
Chart (2015)	Peak position
US Billboard 200	9
US Digital Albums (Billboard)	3
US Americana/Folk Albums (Billboard)	1
US Independent Albums (Billboard)	2
US Top Alternative Albums (Billboard)	3
US Top Rock Albums (Billboard)	2
