= Brand New (Ben Rector song) =

2016 single by Ben Rector

Single by Ben Rector

from the album Brand New
- Released: February 12, 2016
- Genre: Pop rock
- Length: 4:03
- Label: Aptly Named Recordings
- Songwriter(s): Ben Rector; David Hodges; Abe Stoklasa

Music video
- "Brand New" on YouTube

"Brand New" is a song by American singer Ben Rector on his sixth studio album of the same name. It became his first solo entry on Billboard Hot 100, peaking at number 82. The song was featured in the trailers for the 2016 movies The Edge of Seventeen and The Fundamentals of Caring. It was also in a TV spot for the Disney film Moana (2016) and the official trailer of The Croods: A New Age (2020).

== Music video ==
The music video was released on August 18, 2016, and was filmed at Six Flags Over Texas.

== Charts ==
=== Weekly charts ===
Chart (2016)	Peak position
US Billboard Hot 100	82
US Adult Contemporary (Billboard)	10
US Adult Pop Airplay (Billboard)	6
US Hot Rock & Alternative Songs (Billboard)	7
US Pop Airplay (Billboard)	27

=== Year-end charts ===
Chart (2016)	Position
US Adult Contemporary (Billboard)	21
US Adult Top 40 (Billboard)	19
US Hot Rock Songs (Billboard)	19

== Certifications ==
Region	Certification	Certified units/sales
United States (RIAA)	Platinum	1,000,000^{‡}
^{‡} Sales+streaming figures based on certification alone.
