= Stephen Sanchez discography =

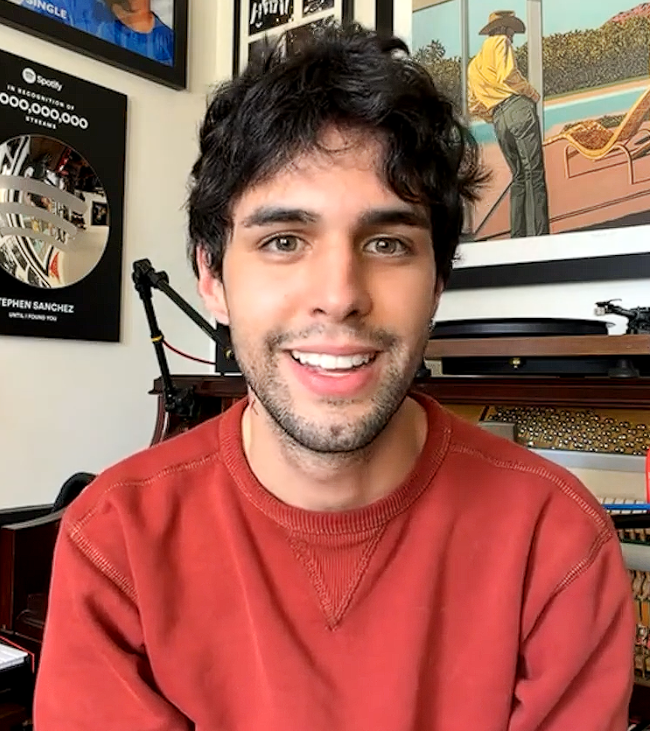
- Sanchez in May 2026.
- Studio albums: 2
- EPs: 2
- Singles: 9
- Promotional singles: 2
- Music videos: 7

The discography of American singer-songwriter Stephen Sanchez consists of two studio albums, three extended plays (EPs), nine singles, and two promotional singles. Sanchez began his music career on TikTok, when he shared a snippet of his original song "Lady by the Sea", which caught the attention of producer Jeremy Zucker, who helped produce the official version, released as his debut single in July 2020.

After signing with Republic Records, Sanchez released the single "Until I Found You" in September 2021, which is his highest-streamed song with over one billion plays on Spotify, and peaked at No. 23 on the Billboard Hot 100. Sanchez would further release two extended plays, before releasing his debut studio album Angel Face in September 2023, and a deluxe version in April 2024. Sanchez also sings the song "Baby Blue Bathing Suit", written for the Disney+ documentary The Beach Boys, released in 2024, and plays the role of Cal in the Warriors concept album by Lin-Manuel Miranda and Eisa Davis.

On November 14, 2025, Sanchez and his fiancée, Devi Tuil, known mononymously as Devi, released the extended-play Dress & Tie; their debut extended play as the duet Dress & Tie.

Sanchez released the single "Sweet Love" on January 9, 2026. His second album Love, Love, Love was released on May 8, 2026, following the release of the title track "Love, Love, Love", and the track "Chuck the Money".

== Studio albums ==
List of albums, with selected details
Title	Details	Peak chart positions				Certifications
Title	Details	US	AUS	NZ	UK	Certifications
Angel Face	Released: September 22, 2023; Label: Mercury, Republic; Format: Vinyl, CD, digital download	90	23	20	64	RIAA: Gold; RMNZ: Gold
Love, Love, Love	Released: May 8, 2026; Label: Mercury, Republic; Format: Vinyl, CD, digital download	—	—	—	—	

== Extended plays ==
List of EPs, with selected details
Title	EP details	Peak chart positions
Title	EP details	CAN
What Was, Not Now	Released: October 15, 2021; Label: Stephen Sanchez (self-released), Republic; Formats: Digital download, streaming	—
Easy on My Eyes	Released: August 21, 2022; Label: Republic; Formats: Digital download, streaming	92
Dress & Tie with Devi as Dress & Tie	Released: November 14, 2025; Label: Mercury; Formats: Digital download, streaming	—
"—" denotes a recording that did not chart.

== Singles ==
=== As lead artist ===
List of singles, with year released, selected chart positions, and album name shown
Title	Year	Peak chart positions										Certifications	Album
Title	Year	US	AUS	CAN	IDN Songs	MLY	NZ	PHL Songs	UK	VIE	WW	Certifications	Album
"Lady by the Sea"	2020	—	—	—	—	—	—	—	—	—	—		What Was, Not Now
"Kayla"	2021	—	—	—	—	—	—	—	—	—	—		What Was, Not Now
"Until I Found You" (solo or with Em Beihold)	2021	23	8	15	2	1	13	3	14	20	11	RIAA: 4× Platinum; ARIA: 7× Platinum; BPI: Platinum; MC: 5× Platinum; RMNZ: 4× Platinum; SNEP: Diamond	Easy on My Eyes and Angel Face
"Missing You" (featuring Ashe)	2022	—	—	—	—	—	—	—	—	—	—		Non-album single
"Evangeline"	2023	—	—	—	—	—	—	—	—	—	—		Angel Face
"Only Girl"	2023	—	—	—	—	—	—	—	—	—	—		Angel Face
"Be More"	2023	—	—	—	—	—	— (Note: "Be More" did not enter the NZ Top 40 Singles Chart, but peaked at number 34 on the NZ Hot Singles Chart.)	—	—	—	—		Angel Face
"High"	2023	—	—	83	—	—	— (Note: "High" did not enter the NZ Top 40 Singles Chart, but peaked at number 10 on the NZ Hot Singles Chart.)	—	—	—	—	RMNZ: Gold	Angel Face
"Baby Blue Bathing Suit"	2024	—	—	—	—	—	—	—	—	—	—		The Beach Boys (soundtrack)
"Silver Bells"	2024	— (Note: "Silver Bells" did not enter the Billboard Hot 100, but peaked at number seven on the Bubbling Under Hot 100 Singles chart.)	—	—	—	—	—	—	—	—	—		Non-album single
"Sweet Love"	2026	—	—	—	—	—	—	—	—	—	—		Love, Love, Love
"Love, Love, Love"	2026	—	—	—	—	—	—	—	—	—	—		Love, Love, Love
"Chuck the Money"	2026	—	—	—	—	—	—	—	—	—	—		Love, Love, Love
"—" denotes a recording that did not chart or was not released in that territory.

=== As featured artist ===
Title	Year	Album
"2000 Miles" (with Gatlin)	2022	Non-album single

== Other charted songs ==
Title	Year	Peak chart positions	Album
Title	Year	NZ Hot	Album
"The Other Side"	2024	26	Angel Face (Club Deluxe)
