= List of Billboard Adult Top 40 number-one songs of the 2020s =

The Billboard Adult Top 40 chart ranks the most popular songs on Adult Top 40 radio stations in the United States, based on airplay detections as measured by Luminate and published weekly by Billboard. These are the songs which reached number one on the Adult Top 40 chart during the 2020s.

== Chart history ==
†	Number-one Adult Top 40 song of the year

Issue date	Song	Artist(s)	Weeks at number one	Ref.
2020
December 7	"Memories"	Maroon 5	13	
March 7	"Circles"†	Post Malone	2	
March 21	"Memories"	Maroon 5	1	
March 28	"Circles"†	Post Malone	2	
April 11	"The Bones"	Maren Morris	1	
April 18	"Don't Start Now"	Dua Lipa	5	
May 23	"Blinding Lights"	The Weeknd	12	
August 15	"Before You Go"	Lewis Capaldi	1	
August 22	"Blinding Lights"	The Weeknd	6	
October 3	"Watermelon Sugar"	Harry Styles	1	
October 10	"Blinding Lights"	The Weeknd	2	
October 24	"I Hope"	Gabby Barrett featuring Charlie Puth	4	
November 21	"Savage Love (Laxed – Siren Beat)"	Jawsh 685 and Jason Derulo	3	
December 12	"Kings & Queens"	Ava Max	7	
2021
January 30	"Holy"	Justin Bieber featuring Chance the Rapper	2	
February 13	"Kings & Queens"	Ava Max	1	
February 20	"Mood"	24kGoldn featuring Iann Dior	1	
February 27	"Bang!"	AJR	1	
March 6	"Mood"	24kGoldn featuring Iann Dior	3	
March 27	"Drivers License"	Olivia Rodrigo	4	
April 24	"Willow"	Taylor Swift	3	
May 15	"Save Your Tears"	The Weeknd	5	
June 19	"Levitating"†	Dua Lipa featuring DaBaby	2	
July 3	"Beautiful Mistakes"	Maroon 5 featuring Megan Thee Stallion	1	
July 10	"Levitating"†	Dua Lipa featuring DaBaby	3	
July 31	"Without You"	The Kid Laroi	1	
August 7	"Levitating"†	Dua Lipa featuring DaBaby	2	
August 21	"Bad Habits"	Ed Sheeran	6	
October 2	"Good 4 U"	Olivia Rodrigo	1	
October 9	"Bad Habits"	Ed Sheeran	1	
October 16	"Stay" †	The Kid Laroi and Justin Bieber	6	
November 27	"Easy on Me"	Adele	10	
2022
February 5	"Shivers"	Ed Sheeran	2	
February 19	"Heat Waves"	Glass Animals	2	
March 5	"Cold Heart"	Elton John and Dua Lipa	1	
March 12	"Ghost"	Justin Bieber	2	
March 26	"ABCDEFU"	Gayle	4	
April 23	"Thats What I Want"	Lil Nas X	2	
May 7	"Enemy"	Imagine Dragons and JID	3	
May 28	"As It Was"	Harry Styles	8	
July 23	"About Damn Time"	Lizzo	2	
August 6	"Numb Little Bug"	Em Beihold	3	
August 27	"Sunroof"	Nicky Youre and Dazy	5	
October 1	"Late Night Talking"	Harry Styles	1	
October 8	"Sunroof"	Nicky Youre and Dazy	1	
October 15	"Unstoppable"	Sia	2	
October 29	"Sunroof"	Nicky Youre and Dazy	1	
November 5	"I Ain't Worried"	OneRepublic	2	
November 19	"Unstoppable"	Sia	1	
November 26	"Hold Me Closer"	Elton John and Britney Spears	1	
December 3	"Anti-Hero"	Taylor Swift	9	
2023
February 4	"I'm Good (Blue)"	David Guetta and Bebe Rexha	2	
February 18	"Unholy"	Sam Smith and Kim Petras	1	
February 25	"Made You Look"	Meghan Trainor	1	
March 4	"Flowers" †	Miley Cyrus	16	
June 24	"Eyes Closed"	Ed Sheeran	2	
July 8	"Flowers" †	Miley Cyrus	1	
July 15	"Calm Down"	Rema and Selena Gomez	2	
July 29	"Karma"	Taylor Swift	2	
August 12	"Fast Car"	Luke Combs	2	
August 26	"Cruel Summer"	Taylor Swift	3	
September 16	"Dance the Night"	Dua Lipa	2	
September 30	"Cruel Summer"	Taylor Swift	11	
December 16	"Used to Be Young"	Miley Cyrus	1	
December 23	"Cruel Summer"	Taylor Swift	9	
2024
February 24	"Greedy"	Tate McRae	1	
March 2	"What Was I Made For?"	Billie Eilish	2	
March 16	"Is It Over Now? (Taylor's Version)"	Taylor Swift	1	
March 23	"Lose Control" †	Teddy Swims	4	
April 20	"Beautiful Things"	Benson Boone	5	
May 25	"Stick Season"	Noah Kahan	1	
June 1	"Beautiful Things"	Benson Boone	3	
June 22	"Fortnight"	Taylor Swift featuring Post Malone	1	
June 29	"Too Sweet"	Hozier	6	
August 10	"I Had Some Help"	Post Malone featuring Morgan Wallen	1	
August 17	"Espresso"	Sabrina Carpenter	2	
August 31	"A Bar Song (Tipsy)"	Shaboozey	2	
September 14	"Too Sweet"	Hozier	6	
October 26	"Birds of a Feather"	Billie Eilish	6	
December 7	"Die with a Smile" †	Lady Gaga and Bruno Mars	1	
December 14	"Stargazing"	Myles Smith	12	
2025
March 8	"Die with a Smile" †	Lady Gaga and Bruno Mars	4	
April 5	"That's So True"	Gracie Abrams	1	
April 12	"Die with a Smile" †	Lady Gaga and Bruno Mars	4	
May 10	"Pink Pony Club"	Chappell Roan	2	
May 24	"Messy"	Lola Young	1	
May 31	"Die with a Smile" †	Lady Gaga and Bruno Mars	1	
June 7	"Ordinary"	Alex Warren	25	
November 29	"The Fate of Ophelia"	Taylor Swift	4	
December 27	"Ordinary"	Alex Warren	5	
2026
January 31	"Golden"	Huntrix	1	
February 7	"Man I Need"	Olivia Dean	3	
February 28	"Opalite"	Taylor Swift	3	
March 21	"I Just Might"	Bruno Mars	9	
May 23	"So Easy (To Fall in Love)"	Olivia Dean	9	
July 25	"Dracula"	Tame Impala and Jennie	4	
August 22	"I Knew It, I Knew You"	Taylor Swift	1	
August 29	"Dracula"	Tame Impala and Jennie	7	
October 17	"Hate That I Made You Love Me"	Ariana Grande	1	
October 24	"Dracula"	Tame Impala and Jennie	5	

== See also ==
- 2020s in music
- List of artists who reached number one on the U.S. Adult Top 40 chart
