= The Connie Co Show Tour =

2024 headlining concert tour by Stephen Sanchez

- Tour by Stephen Sanchez
- Promotional poster for tour
- Associated album: Angel Face (Club Deluxe)
- Start date: August 1, 2024
- End date: October 29, 2024
- No. of shows: 39
- Supporting acts: Ray Bull; The Brook & The Bluff; The Paper Kites

Stephen Sanchez concert chronology
- Live In Person Tour (2023-24); The Connie Co Show Tour (2024); Sing Love Again Tour (2026)

External images
- Photos: Stephen Sanchez lights up the Minnesota State Fair Grandstand – The Current

The Connie Co Show Tour was the third headlining concert tour by American singer-songwriter Stephen Sanchez, in support of the deluxe version of his debut studio album Angel Face (Club Deluxe). The tour began on August 1, 2024, in Columbus, Ohio, and concluded on October 29, 2024, in Orlando, Florida. Ray Bull, The Brook & The Bluff, and The Paper Kites were announced as opening acts for the tour.

== Background ==
Before embarking on this tour, Sanchez had just concluded a world tour across North America, Europe, and Australia, in support of his debut studio album, Angel Face. Following the release of its deluxe version, Angel Face (Club Deluxe), it was announced that Sanchez would be embarking on another headline tour across North America, with two shows in Japan. The tour was themed as a late-night talk show taking place in the 1960s, called The Connie Co Show, starring Connie Co, portrayed by Austin Cain, in which Sanchez and his fictional band, The Moon Crests, make their television debut.

== Setlist ==
This setlist is from the first show of the tour in Columbus, Ohio, on August 1, 2024. It is not indicative of the entire tour.

1. Evangeline
2. Only Girl
3. Emotional Vacation
4. Doesn't Do Me Any Good
5. I Need You Most Of All
6. Unchained Melody (cover)
7. Be More
8. Something About Her
9. No One Knows
10. Just Let Me Into Your Heart (Note: Live debut.) (Note: Unreleased.)
11. Put Your Head On My Shoulder (cover)
12. The Other Side
13. Oh, Pretty Woman (cover)
14. This Thing Called Love
15. The Pool
16. Howling At Wolves
17. High
18. Until I Found You
19. Shake

== Tour dates ==
All tour dates took place in the year 2024.

Date	City	Country	Venue	Opening act(s)
August 1	Columbus	United States	Ohio State Fair	Ray Bull
August 2	Toronto	Canada	Massey Hall	Ray Bull
August 4	Montreal	Canada	Osheaga Festival	—
August 7	Cleveland	United States	Jacobs Pavilion	Ray Bull
August 8	Detroit	United States	Masonic Temple	Ray Bull
August 9	Chautauqua	United States	Chautauqua Amphitheater	Ray Bull
August 11	Carnation	United States	Thing Festival	—
August 17	Tokyo	Japan	Summer Sonic Festival	—
August 18	Osaka	Japan	Summer Sonic Festival	—
August 27	Syracuse	United States	New York State Fair	—
August 31	Saint Paul	United States	Minnesota State Fair	Madi Diaz
September 2	Palmer	United States	Alaska State Fair	—
September 4	Vancouver	Canada	Doug Mitchell Thunderbird Sports Centre	The Brook & The Bluff
September 6	Portland	United States	Edgefield Concerts on The Lawn	The Brook & The Bluff
September 7	Wheatland	United States	Hard Rock Live Sacramento	The Brook & The Bluff
September 9	Reno	United States	Grand Sierra Resort Theatre	—
September 10	Las Vegas	United States	The Pearl Concert Theatre at Palms Casino Resort	The Brook & The Bluff
September 12	Highland	United States	Yaamava' Theater	—
September 13	Los Angeles	United States	YouTube Theater	The Brook & The Bluff
September 14	Santa Barbara	United States	Santa Barbara Bowl	The Brook & The Bluff
September 15	San Diego	United States	Cal Coast Credit Union Amphitheater	The Brook & The Bluff
September 17	Phoenix	United States	Arizona Financial Theatre	The Brook & The Bluff
September 19	Denver	United States	The Mission Ballroom	The Brook & The Bluff
September 21	Salt Lake City	United States	The Great Saltair	The Brook & The Bluff
September 24	Indianapolis	United States	Everwise Amphitheater at White River State Park	The Brook & The Bluff
September 25	Chicago	United States	The Salt Shed	The Brook & The Bluff
September 27	Kansas City	United States	The Midland Theatre	The Brook & The Bluff
September 29	Franklin	United States	Pilgrimage Music & Cultural Festival	—
October 13	Atlanta	United States	Coca-Cola Roxy	The Brook & The Bluff
October 15	Raleigh	United States	Red Hat Amphitheater	The Brook & The Bluff
October 17	Washington, D.C.	United States	The Anthem	The Brook & The Bluff
October 18	Uncasville	United States	Mohegan Sun Arena	The Brook & The Bluff
October 19	Philadelphia	United States	The Met	The Brook & The Bluff
October 22	Portland	United States	Merrill Auditorium	The Brook & The Bluff
October 23	Boston	United States	MGM Music Hall at Fenway	The Brook & The Bluff
October 25	Charlotte	United States	Skyla Credit Union Amphitheatre	The Brook & The Bluff
October 26	St. Augustine	United States	The St. Augustine Amphitheatre	The Brook & The Bluff
October 27	Hollywood	United States	Seminole Hard Rock Hotel & Casino	The Brook & The Bluff
October 29	Orlando	United States	Dr. Phillips Center	The Brook & The Bluff
