= Tors (band) =

English band

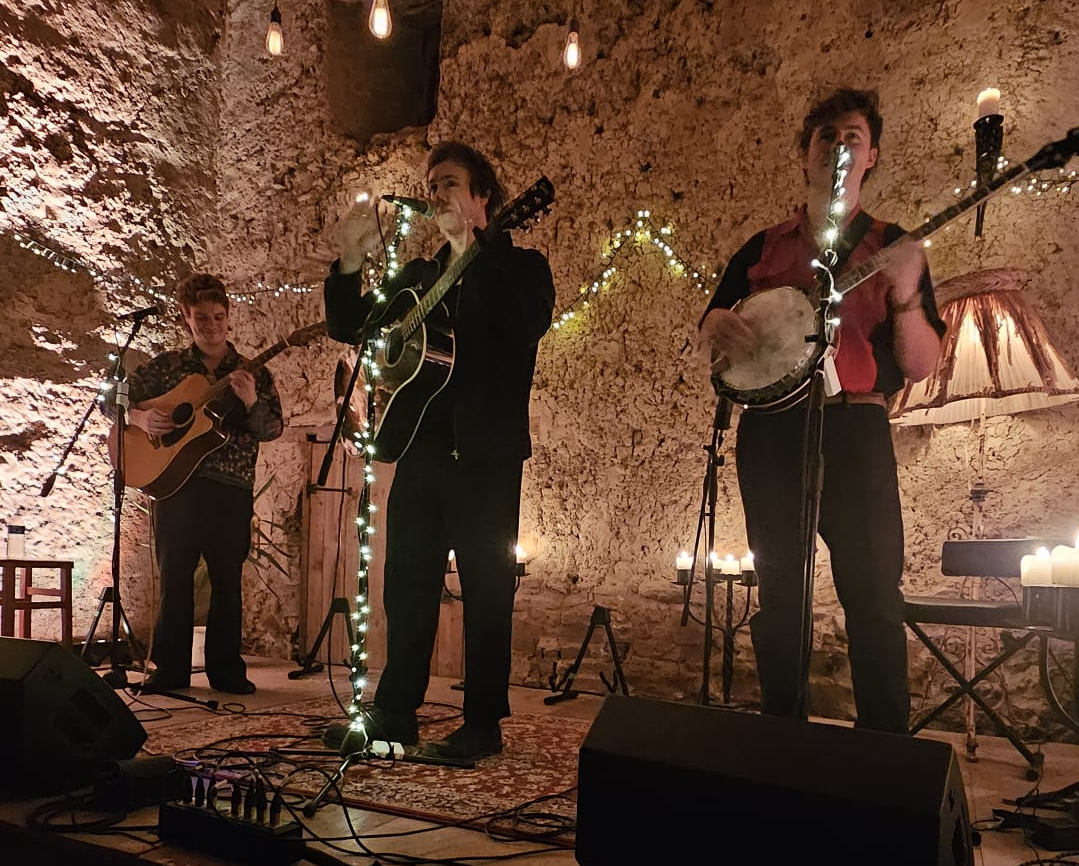
- Tors in 2023

Background information
- Origin: Exeter, Devon, United Kingdom
- Genres: folk; indie folk; indie pop
- Years active: 2016–present
- Label: Glassnote Records
- Members: Matt Weedon (lead vocals, guitar) Theo Weedon (guitar, backing vocals) Jack Bowden (drums, piano, banjo, backing vocals)
- Past members: Andy Humphries; Sam Pritchard
- Website: tors.band

TikTok information
- Page: thetorsband
- Followers: 500 thousand
- Last updated: September 29, 2025

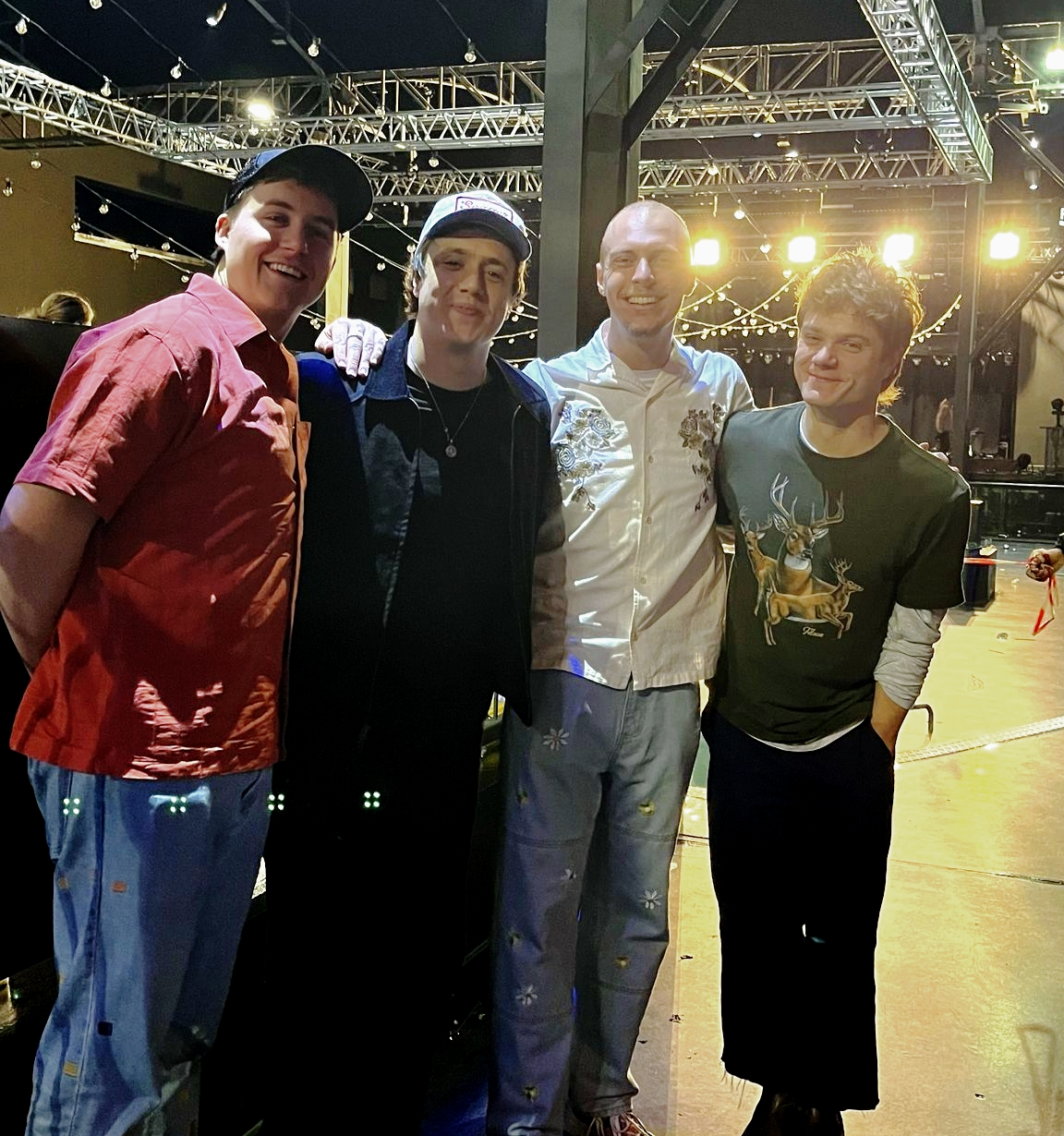
Tors in Milan, after supporting Myles Smith, March 2025

Tors are a three-piece indie folk band from Devon, United Kingdom, composed of brothers Matt and Theo Weedon, and Jack Bowden. They have released 4 EPs.

The band took their name from tors, a type of rock formation commonly found in Dartmoor National Park, after moving to Devon from Guildford.

== Career ==
The band was founded in 2016 in Guildford, Surrey by brothers Theo and Matt Weedon, grandsons of influential guitarist Bert Weedon, and Jack Bowden, a drummer whom the brothers recruited via an advert on Gumtree. Their father would play records of The Beatles, Nick Drake, 10cc, Simon & Garfunkel.

The band gained recognition after a song they wrote was featured in a advertising campaign by Jack Wills.

The band played The Great Escape Festival in 2018.

In July 2023, the band signed a recording contract with Glassnote Records.

In June 2023, their single "Amsterdam" became BBC Radio One Introducing Track of the Week.

The band played Glastonbury Festival 2024.

The band released the EP Never Give Up in 2025.

The band opened for Stephen Sanchez for the European/UK leg of his Sing Love Again Tour.

== Artistry and influences ==
The brothers focus on harmonies and cite The Eagles, Crosby, Stills & Nash, and the Everly Brothers as favorite band. They also cite Oasis, Doves, and B. B. King as influences.

== Tours ==
=== Headlining ===
- UK Tour (June 2023)
- UK & EU Tour (2024)
- UK & EU Tour (2025)

=== Opening act ===
- Sam Ryder (2023)
- James Blunt (2024)
- Myles Smith - We Were Never Strangers (March - April 2025)
- Arthur Hill (2026)
- Stephen Sanchez - Sing Love Again Tour (2026)

== Discography ==
=== Extended plays ===
Title	Details
Wilder Days	Released: 11 May 2018; Label: Lucky 7 Recordings; Formats: Digital download, streaming
Wilder Days (Acoustic)	Released: 13 July 2018; Label: Lucky 7 Recordings; Formats: Digital download, streaming
Anything Can Happen	Released: 20 January 2023; Label: This Fiction; Formats: CD, digital download, streaming
Anything Can Happen (Alt Versions)	Released: 8 March 2023; Label: This Fiction; Formats: Digital download, streaming
Miracle	Released: 26 April 2024; Label: Glassnote Records; Formats: Digital download, streaming
Never Give Up	Released: 28 February 2025; Label: Glassnote Records; Formats: CD, LP, Digital download, streaming

=== Singles ===
Title	Year	Album
"Hold Me"	2016	Non-album singles
"Now We Fall"	2017	Non-album singles
"Merry Go Round	2017	Non-album singles
"Seventeen"	2017	Non-album singles
"Wilder Days (Acoustic)"	2018	Non-album singles
"Don't Cry"	2018	Non-album singles
"Don't Cry (Acoustic)"	2019	Non-album singles
"Something I Said"	2019	Non-album singles
"Something I Said (Acoustic)"	2019	Non-album singles
"Empty Hands"	2019	Non-album singles
"Empty Hands (Acoustic)"	2019	Non-album singles
"The Way That It Goes"	2020	Non-album singles
"Look at Us"	2020	Non-album singles
"Broken Bones"	2020	Non-album singles
"Sorry"	2020	Non-album singles
"All My Friends"	2020	Non-album singles
"Love Me Back"	2020	Non-album singles
"Don't Be Afraid"	2020	Non-album singles
"Love You Again"	2020	Non-album singles
"How It Hurts"	2020	Non-album singles
"Garden On The Kitchen Floor"	2022	Non-album singles
"Lonely"	2022	Non-album singles
"I Don't Miss You (Except For When I Do)" (feat. Lily Williams)	2022	Non-album singles
"Amsterdam"	2023	Non-album singles
"Miracle"	2023	Non-album singles
"Miracle (Piano Version)"	2023	Non-album singles
"Tell You"	2023	Non-album singles
"Happy Enough"	2024	Non-album singles
"Happy Enough (Acoustic)"	2024	Non-album singles
"Only For You"	2024	Non-album singles
"Only For You (A Capella)"	2024	Non-album singles
"If It Takes All Night"	2024	Non-album singles
"Never Give Up"	2024	Non-album singles
"Never Give Up (Acoustic)"	2024	Non-album singles
"Dying Stars"	2024	Non-album singles
"Scared"	2025	Non-album singles
"I Don't Wanna Know"	2025	Non-album singles

=== As featured artist ===
Title	Year	Album
"Better With You" (Müne featuring Tors)	2020	Non-album single
