= Sing Love Again Tour =

2026 concert tour by Stephen Sanchez

- Tour by Stephen Sanchez
- Poster for European dates
- Associated album: Love, Love, Love
- Start date: April 25, 2026
- End date: May 11, 2026
- Legs: 2 (including 1 cancelled)
- No. of shows: 18 (including 7 cancelled)
- Supporting act: Tors

Stephen Sanchez concert chronology
- The Connie Co Show Tour (2024); Sing Love Again Tour (2026)

The Sing Love Again Tour was the fourth headline concert tour by American singer-songwriter Stephen Sanchez, in promotion of his second studio album Love, Love, Love. The tour's European leg began on April 25, 2026, in Paris at Salle Pleyel, with English band Tors as the openers. An Australian leg of the tour was announced to begin on July 11, 2026, in Christchurch, New Zealand, but was cancelled abruptly by Sanchez, who cited burnout and stress with the making of the album.

== Background ==
After releasing his single "Sweet Love" on January 9, 2026, Sanchez announced he would be embarking on a tour across the UK and Europe, consisting of 11 dates. English indie folk band Tors was announced as the opening act. Following the release of his next two singles, and the announcement of his second studio album Love, Love, Love, Sanchez announced an additional leg of the tour, running across Australia and New Zealand, consisting of seven dates.

During the first show in Paris, Sanchez's fiancée Devi Tuil appeared alongside him on stage, and the pair sang "Me Without You", the beginning track to their collaborative extended-play Dress & Tie, released as a duet of the same name.

== Cancellation ==
Sanchez abruptly cancelled the Australian leg of his tour without explanation. On June 15, 2026, he posted on his Instagram, confirming that the Australian leg of the tour, as well as an unannounced American leg of the tour would not be happening. He explained that the making of his latest studio album Love, Love, Love was plagued by stress, anxiety, and negative energy, stating that the experience was so bad that he "wanted to quit making music all together." He said that he embarked on the Europe and UK leg of the tour anyway, hoping it would change his outlook, but it did not. He apologized to the fans that sought to attend his shows, saying "you did nothing wrong, and I thank you for wanting me to be in your city. I am incredibly lucky to be doing this job as much as you've allowed me to."

Sanchez also stated that the current state of popular music was also a factor in his stress and burnout, citing "disgusting, heavily pornographic lyrics, nothing driving people to do anything, to see anything different in a way that helps others along." Additionally, he cited that he was fed up with the need to be a "music influencer," and the need to have a constant social media presence to maintain relevance. He closed out the statement by saying he would return when he created a space to "make the art that I want to make and promote it in a way that feels restful for me."

Australian tour promotion company Frontier Touring said in a statement that the decision to cancel the Australian leg of the tour "was made together with Stephen and with his team. Unfortunately, it was not the right time for him to be touring the market, but we look forward to his return to Australia and New Zealand in the future.” The tour's cancellation and Sanchez's subsequent statement received mixed reactions from fans.

== Tour dates ==
=== Leg 1 – Europe & UK ===
Date	City	Country	Venue
April 25	Paris	France	Salle Pleyel
April 26	Brussels	Belgium	La Madeleine
April 28	Amsterdam	The Netherlands	Melkweg
April 29	Utrecht	The Netherlands	TivoliVredenburg
May 1	Hamburg	Germany	Docks
May 2	Cologne	Germany	Carlswerk Victoria
May 5	Glasgow	United Kingdom	O2 Academy
May 6	Manchester	United Kingdom	Manchester Academy
May 8	Nottingham	United Kingdom	Rock City
May 9	Bristol	United Kingdom	Bristol Beacon
May 11	London	United Kingdom	Roundhouse

=== Leg 2 – Australia & New Zealand (Cancelled) ===
Date	City	Country	Venue
July 11	Christchurch	New Zealand	Christchurch Town Hall
July 12	Auckland	New Zealand	Auckland Town Hall
July 15	Brisbane	Australia	The Fortitude Music Hall
July 18	Sydney	Australia	Hordern Pavilion
July 21	Melbourne	Australia	Palais Theatre
July 25	Adelaide	Australia	Thebarton Theatre
July 28	Perth	Australia	ICF: Warehouse

External images
- Stephen Sanchez: Manchester Academy – Live Review – Louder Than War
