= Tales of a Failed Shapeshifter =

Studio album by Em Beihold
- Released: February 27, 2026
- Recorded: 2022–2025
- Genres: Indie pop; baroque pop; alternative pop
- Length: 29:02
- Label: Republic

Em Beihold chronology
Egg in the Backseat (2022)	Tales of a Failed Shapeshifter (2026)

Singles from Tales of a Failed Shapeshifter
- 1. "Brutus" Released: July 18, 2025; 2. "Hot Goblin" Released: September 5, 2025; 3. "Scared of the Dark" Released: October 24, 2025

Tales of a Failed Shapeshifter is the debut studio album by American singer-songwriter Em Beihold, which was released on February 27, 2026, via Republic Records. The singer, who rose to fame with her 2022 debut major-label single "Numb Little Bug", announced the album on January 7, 2026. The album was preceded by the singles "Brutus", "Hot Goblin" and "Scared of the Dark". The album peaked at number 69 on the UK Album Downloads Chart.

To promote the album, Beihold embarked on the Tales of a Failed Shapeshifter Tour. The first leg began on May 12, 2026 in London and concluded on June 15, 2026 in West Hollywood, California. The second leg is set to begin on October 31, 2026 in Mexico City, Mexico and conclude on November 19, 2026 in Los Angeles, California.

== Background ==
Regarding her album, Beihold said of her album that it's the "proudest I’ve ever been of anything I’ve made." She described her album as being about the "journey through depression, experiencing complete loss of self, and how I have come out on the other side to be the happiest and most me I have ever been. It’s fun and pop and silly, and I’m ready for 2025 to be done so I can finally share this new music with my fans!"

== Track listing ==
Adapted from Spotify.

No.	Title	Writer(s)	Length
1.	"Scared of the Dark"	Em Beihold; James Flannigan; Timmy Skelly; Henry Brill	2:57
2.	"Brutus"	Beihold; Flannigan	2:28
3.	"Unicorn"	Beihold; Jason Suwito; Nick Lopez	2:28
4.	"Van Gogh"	Beihold; Flannigan; Sarah Troy	2:25
5.	"Hot Goblin"	Beihold; Suwito; Lopez	2:38
6.	"Exorcism"	Beihold; Mags Duval; Dan Silberstein; Ryan Linvill	2:49
7.	"Lottery"	Beihold; Mike Wise; Maize Olinger	2:49
8.	"Soup!"	Beihold; CJ Baran; JT Foley	1:44
9.	"Shiny New Things"	Beihold; Jason Evigan; Lopez; Solly	2:13
10.	"Strong Medicine"	Beihold; Flannigan; Brill	3:09
11.	"Won't Let Go"	Beihold; Yoshi Flower; Will Van Zandt	3:17
Total length:			29:02

== Chart positions ==
Chart	Peak position
UK Album Downloads (OCC)	69
