= List of artists who reached number one on the Billboard Adult Top 40 =

This is a list of recording artists who have reached number one on Billboard magazine's Adult Top 40 chart.

- All acts are listed alphabetically.
- Solo artists are alphabetised by last name, Groups by group name excluding "A," "An" and "The.".
- Each act's total of number-one singles is shown after their name.
- Featured artists that have been given credit on the record are included

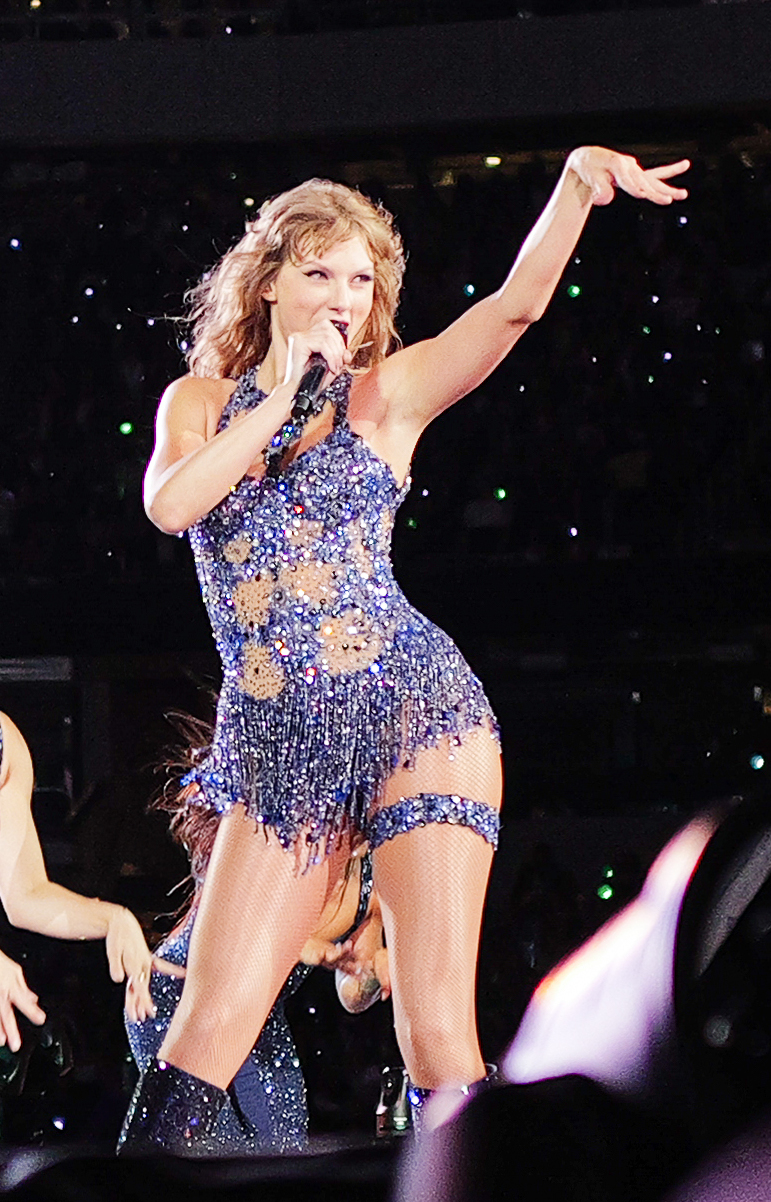
With a total of 16 songs, Taylor Swift holds the record for the most number-one songs.

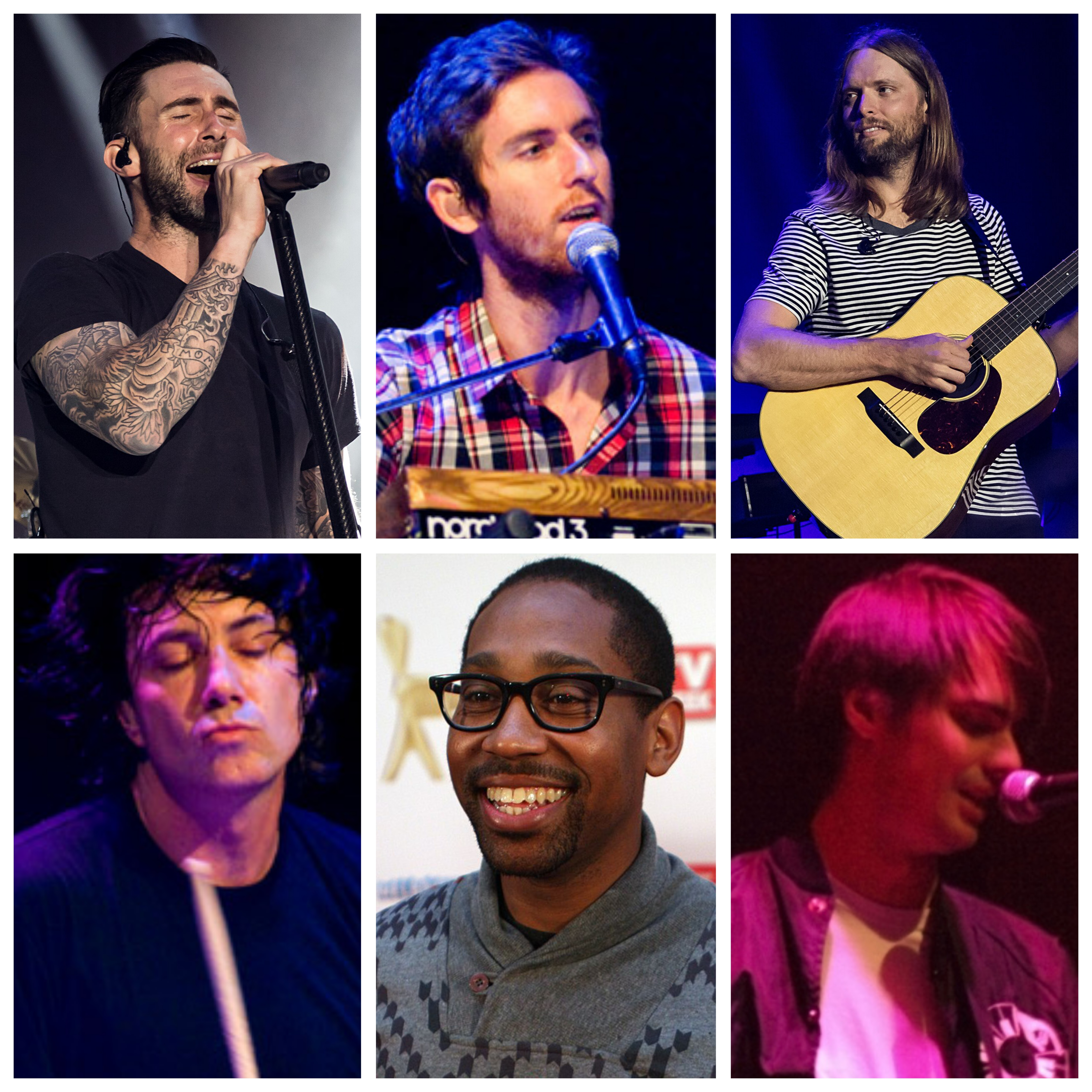
With a total of 15 songs, Maroon 5 holds the record for the most number-one songs by a band.

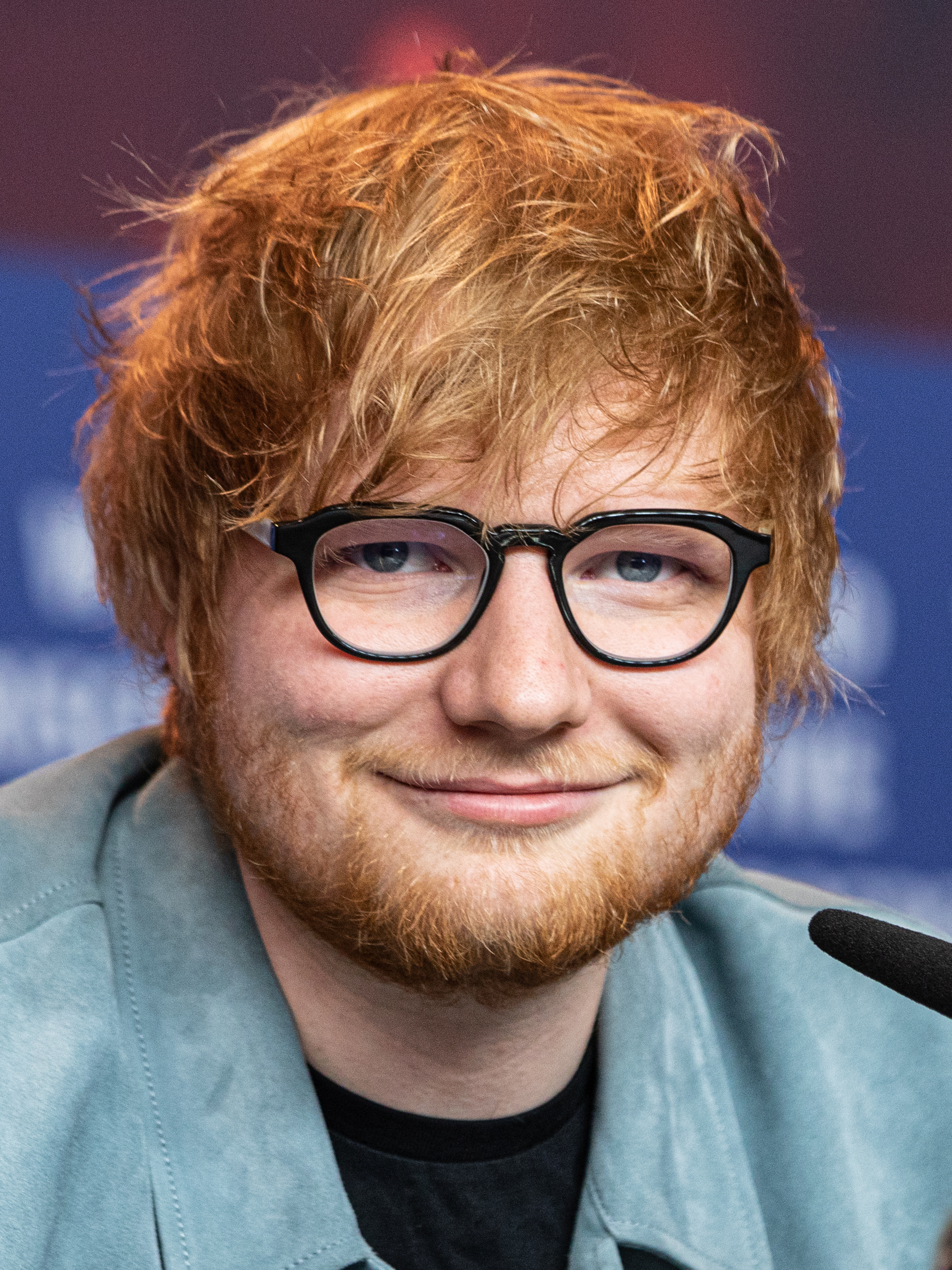
With a total of 8 songs, Ed Sheeran holds the record for the most number-one songs by a male solo artist.

== 0-9 ==
- 3 Doors Down (2)
- 5 Seconds of Summer(1)
- 24kGoldn (1)

== A ==
- Gracie Abrams (1)
- Adele (6)
- Christina Aguilera (2)
- AJR (1)
- The All-American Rejects (1)
- American Authors (1)
- James Arthur (1)
- Avicii (1)

== B ==
- Tal Bachman (1)
- Alex Band (2)
- Sara Bareilles (1)
- Gabby Barrett (1)
- Em Beihold (1)
- Justin Bieber (5)
- Benny Blanco (1)
- James Blunt (1)
- Benson Boone (1)
- Boyz II Men (1)
- Michelle Branch (1)

== C ==
- Alessia Cara (1)
- Camila Cabello (3)
- Cardi B (1)
- Colbie Caillat (1)
- The Calling (1)
- Lewis Capaldi (2)
- Mariah Carey (1)
- Sabrina Carpenter (1)
- Tracy Chapman (1)
- The Chainsmokers (2)
- Chance the Rapper (1)
- Chumbawamba (1)
- Eric Clapton (1)
- Kelly Clarkson (4)
- Coldplay (2)
- Paula Cole (1)
- Shawn Colvin (1)
- Luke Combs (1)
- Creed (1)
- Sheryl Crow (2)
- Miley Cyrus (2)

== D ==
- DaBaby (1)
- Daughtry (4)
- Olivia Dean (2)
- Gavin DeGraw (1)
- Dazy (1)
- Del Amitri (1)
- Jason Derulo (1)
- Dido (1)
- Celine Dion (1)
- Iann Dior (1)
- Diplo (1)
- DNCE (1)

== E ==
- Billie Eilish (2)
- Enya (1)
- Evanescence (1)

== F ==
- Fergie (1)
- Five for Fighting (1)
- Florida Georgia Line (1)
- The Fray (2)
- Fun (2)

== G ==
- Lady Gaga (1)
- Gayle (1)
- Glass Animals (1)
- Gnarls Barkley (1)
- Gnash (1)
- Selena Gomez (1)
- Goo Goo Dolls (3)
- Gotye (1)
- Grey (1)
- Ellie Goulding (3)
- Andy Grammer (1)
- Ariana Grande (1)
- A Great Big World (1)
- Green Day (2)
- David Guetta (1)

== H ==
- Halsey (3)
- Sophie B. Hawkins (1)
- Faith Hill (1)
- Hoobastank (1)
- Hootie & the Blowfish (1)
- Niall Horan (1)
- Hot Chelle Rae (1)
- Hozier (2)
- Huntrix (1)

== I ==
- Imagine Dragons (4)
- Natalie Imbruglia (1)

== J ==
- Jawsh 685 (1)
- Jennie (1)
- Jewel (2)
- JID (1)
- Elton John (2)
- Jonas Brothers (1)

== K ==
- Noah Kahan (1)
- Khalid (1)
- The Kid Laroi (2)
- Kimbra (1)
- Elle King (1)
- Kings of Leon (1)
- Chad Kroeger (1)

== L ==
- Lady Antebellum (1)
- Kendrick Lamar (1)
- Avril Lavigne (2)
- Swae Lee (1)
- John Legend (2)
- Dean Lewis (1)
- Donna Lewis (1)
- Leona Lewis (1)
- Lil Nas X (1)
- Lifehouse (2)
- Dua Lipa (3)
- Lizzo (1)
- Lukas Graham (1)
- Lorde (2)
- Lovelytheband (1)
- The Lumineers (1)

== M ==
- Magic! (1)
- Post Malone (3)
- Maroon 5 (15)
- Bruno Mars (5)
- Ricky Martin (1)
- Ava Max (1)
- Matchbox Twenty (4)
- John Mayer (1)
- Sarah McLachlan (1)
- Tate McRae (1)
- Megan Thee Stallion (1)
- Shawn Mendes (6)
- Janelle Monáe (1)
- Alanis Morissette (2)
- Maren Morris (1)
- Jason Mraz (1)
- Shawn Mullins (1)
- Mumford & Sons (1)

== N ==
- Neon Trees (1)
- Nickelback (5)
- Nico & Vinz (1)
- Normani (1)
- No Doubt (1)

== O ==
- One Direction (1)
- OneRepublic (4)
- Owl City (1)

== P ==
- Panic! at the Disco (1)
- Sean Paul (1)
- Paramore (1)
- Passenger (1)
- Katy Perry (8)
- Kim Petras (1)
- Phillip Phillips (1)
- Pink (10)
- Plain White T's (1)
- Rachel Platten (2)
- Portugal. The Man (1)
- Daniel Powter (1)
- Charlie Puth (3)

== R ==
- Rema (1)
- Bebe Rexha (2)
- Chappell Roan (1)
- Olivia Rodrigo (2)
- Mark Ronson (1)
- Nate Ruess (1)

== S ==
- MAX (1)
- Ed Sheeran (8)
- Santana (3)
- The Script (1)
- Seal (1)
- Shaboozey (1)
- Shinedown (1)
- Sia (2)
- Sister Hazel (1)
- Smash Mouth (2)
- Myles Smith (1)
- Sam Smith (3)
- Snow Patrol (1)
- Britney Spears (1)
- Harry Styles (3)
- Sugar Ray (1)
- Taylor Swift (16)
- Teddy Swims (1)

== T ==
- Tame Impala (1)
- Robin Thicke (1)
- Rob Thomas (4)
- T.I. (1)
- Timbaland (1)
- Justin Timberlake (3)
- Train (4)
- Meghan Trainor (2)
- KT Tunstall (1)
- Twenty One Pilots (1)

== U ==
- Uncle Kracker (1)

== V ==
- Vertical Horizon (1)

== W ==
- Walk the Moon (1)
- Morgan Wallen (1)
- The Wallflowers (1)
- Alex Warren (1)
- The Weeknd (2)
- Pharrell Williams (2)

== X ==
- X Ambassadors (1)

== Y ==
- Lola Young (1)
- Young Thug (1)
- Nicky Youre (1)

== Z ==
- Zedd (1)
