= Zahra Dowlatabadi =

Iranian filmmaker

- زهرا دولت آبادی
- Born: September 14, 1962 (age 64); Tehran, Iran
- Occupations: Filmmaker, Producer
- Children: Em Beihold

Zahra Dowlatabadi (born September 14, 1962) (Persian: زهرا دولت آبادی) is an Iranian-American filmmaker and film producer. She is the mother of American singer-songwriter Em Beihold.

== Biography ==
Zahra Dowlatabadi is an Iranian-American film and animation producer. She earned a master’s degree in film studies from the University of Southern California. In 2022, she served as line producer for Cartoon Saloon’s My Father’s Dragon for Netflix. Her other credits include The Jetsons: Robo-Wrestlemania and Scooby-Doo! Shaggy’s Showdown (2017), as well as producing seasons 2 and 3 of Brickleberry for Comedy Central. She served as showrunner on the 39th Annie Awards in 2012 for ASIFA-Hollywood.

Dowlatabadi wrote and directed the 2016 documentary short Parthian and was executive producer of the 2008 documentary Lady of Roses, featuring Homayoun Sanatizadeh's love letter to his wife, Shahindokht Sarlati, the founder of Zahra's Rosewater Company. Dowlatabadi is co-author, with Catherine Winder, of the book Producing Animation (2001; 2nd ed. 2011; 3rd ed. 2020).

She began her feature animation career at Warner Bros. Feature Animation on Quest for Camelot, later contributing to Space Jam and producing a UNICEF PSA on Children’s Rights. At Universal Cartoon Studios, she co-produced and produced sequels to The Land Before Time, winning an Annie Award in 1996.

Earlier in her career, she worked at Hanna-Barbera on Once Upon a Forest and at Tokyo Movie Shinsha on Bionic Six, Visionaries: Knights of the Magical Light, and Little Nemo: Adventures in Slumberland.
