= Love, Love, Love (Stephen Sanchez album) =

Studio album by Stephen Sanchez
- Released: May 8, 2026
- Length: 31:46
- Label: Mercury
- Producers: Oscar Görres; Mattman & Robin

Stephen Sanchez chronology
Dress & Tie (2025)	Love, Love, Love (2026)

Love, Love, Love is the second studio album by the American singer-songwriter Stephen Sanchez. Released on May 8, 2026 via Mercury Records, it follows three singles released by Sanchez; "Sweet Love", "Love, Love, Love", and "Chuck the Money". Sanchez was embarking on the Sing Love Again Tour in support of the album, but cancelled it before embarking on the Australian leg of the tour, citing stress, anxiety, and negative energy involved with the making of the album.

== Background ==
Sanchez released the single "Sweet Love" on January 9, 2026. "Sweet Love" was his first single released in over two years, following his rendition of the Christmas song "Silver Bells". Sanchez would go on to announce the title of his upcoming second studio album, Love, Love, Love, on March 4, and the title track "Love, Love, Love" was released on March 6. Another single from the album, "Chuck the Money" was released on April 17.

Sanchez has stated that the album was mean to divert from the '50s/'60s rock and fictional storyline that inspired his debut studio album Angel Face. He says the album was inspired by "the love I've been lucky enough to receive, the love I sometimes struggle to give to others, and my desire to see people come together", and that the album is "much more a reflection of my personal life now, almost like a coming of age in terms of love."

== Cancellation of tour ==
The album was promoted with the Sing Love Again Tour. Sanchez embarked on the first leg of the tour across Europe and the UK, and was announced to be embarking on an additional Australian leg of the tour, but cancelled it abruptly. In a statement on Instagram published on June 15, 2026, Sanchez stated that anxiety, stress, and negative energy involved with the making of the album "absolutely ruined this music" for him. He stated the negative experience had affected him so much that he "wanted to quit making music all together". He stated he embarked on the first dates of the tour to see if the experience would change his outlook on the music, but it did not. He also expressed grievances with the nature of modern music, citing "disgusting, heavily pornographic lyrics, nothing driving people to do anything, to see anything different in a way that helps others along". Additionally, he stated he was fed up with the need to have a constant presence on social media to maintain popularity. He closed out the statement by saying that he would return when he had created a space for him to "make the art that I want to make and promote it in a way that feels restful for me".

== Track listing ==
All titles are styled in all uppercase.

Love, Love, Love track listing
No.	Title	Writer(s)	Length
1.	"It Might Be Love"	Stephen Sanchez; Mattias Larsson; Robin Fredriksson	3:06
2.	"Sweet Love"	Sanchez; Oscar Görres	2:25
3.	"Love, Love, Love"	Sanchez; Görres; Rami Yacoub	4:02
4.	"Home to Mother" (with Stephen Day)	Sanchez; Stephen Day	3:16
5.	"Chuck the Money"	Sanchez; Görres; Yacoub	2:44
6.	"Already Got Me"	Sanchez; Görres	2:18
7.	"Ooo Baby (I Love You)"	Sanchez; Day; Fredriksson; Larsson	2:06
8.	"Dance Away the Music"	Sanchez; Day; Fredriksson; Larsson	2:12
9.	"Forgetting Your Kiss"	Sanchez; Görres; Yacoub	3:05
10.	"Don't Let Me Go"	Sanchez; Görres	2:48
11.	"You Are So Beautiful"	Sanchez	3:44
Total length:			31:46

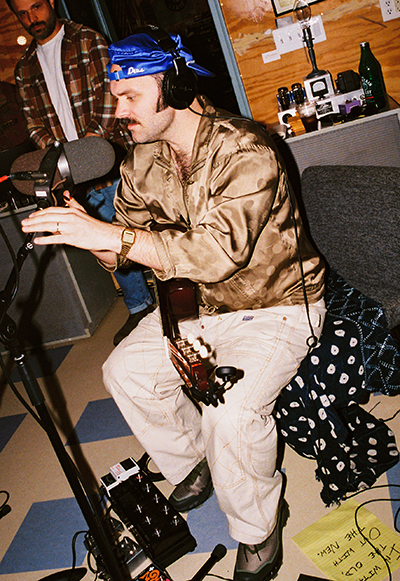
Singer-songwriter Stephen Day features on the track "Home to Mother".

== Personnel ==
Credits are adapted from Tidal.

- Stephen Sanchez – vocals, background vocals (all tracks); piano (tracks 1, 7, 11), guitar (5, 6, 9, 10)
- Oscar Görres – bass, drums, guitar, keyboards, programming, production, engineering (all tracks); piano (1–6, 8–10), percussion (2–5, 7, 9)
- Serban Ghenea – mixing
- Bryce Bordone – mixing
- Randy Merrill – mastering
- Mattman & Robin – production (1, 7, 8, 11); guitar (1, 7, 8), programming (1, 7, 11), background vocals (1, 8); vocal production, vocal engineering (4); keyboards, piano (8); drums, percussion (11)
- Günter Gorres – saxophone (2, 3), tenor saxophone (5)
- Jonne Bentlöv – trumpet (3, 5), flugelhorn (5)
- Davide Rossi – string arrangement, violin, viola, cello (3)
- Evan Cobb – baritone saxophone, tenor saxophone (4); saxophone (5)
- Vinnie Ciesielski – trumpet (4, 5), flugelhorn (4)
- Courtlan Clement – guitar (4, 5)
- Konrad Snyder – engineering (4, 5)
- Stephen Day – vocals (4)

== Charts ==
Chart performance for Love, Love, Love
Chart (2026)	Peak position
Belgian Albums (Ultratop Flanders)	102
Belgian Albums (Ultratop Wallonia)	166
French Physical Albums (SNEP)	101
Scottish Albums (Official Charts)	20
UK Albums Sales (OCC)	21
