= The Beach Boys (film) =

2024 American film by Frank Marshall

- Digital release poster
- Directed by: Frank Marshall; Thom Zimmy
- Written by: Mark Monroe
- Produced by: Frank Marshall; Irving Azoff; Nicholas Ferrall; Jeanne Elfant Festa; Aly Parker
- Starring: Mike Love; Brian Wilson; Carl Wilson; Dennis Wilson; David Marks; Al Jardine
- Cinematography: Ernesto Lomeli
- Edited by: Jake Hostetterr; Robert A. Martinez
- Music by: The Beach Boys; Mike McCready
- Production companies: Walt Disney Pictures; K/M Documentaries; White Horse Pictures; Diamond Docs
- Distributed by: Walt Disney Studios Motion Pictures
- Release dates: May 21, 2024 (Los Angeles); May 24, 2024 (Disney+)
- Running time: 113 minutes
- Country: United States
- Language: English

The Beach Boys is a 2024 American musical documentary film directed by Frank Marshall and Thom Zimmy focused on the American rock band the Beach Boys. Featuring interviews from band members Brian Wilson, Mike Love, Al Jardine, David Marks and Bruce Johnston, as well as archival footage of Carl Wilson and Dennis Wilson, the film examines the band's history beginning with their formation up until the mid-1970s. The film also features appearances from Janelle Monáe, Lindsey Buckingham, Ryan Tedder and Don Was.

The Beach Boys held its premiere in Los Angeles on May 21, 2024, and was released on May 24, 2024, as a Disney+ original film. It received mixed-to-positive reviews from critics, who considered the film to be friendly towards newcomers and nostalgic. However, it received criticism from fans of the band for ignoring the group's history after the early 1970s, and its coverage of their music was considered by some to be superficial.

== Synopsis ==
The film chronicles the band's rise from their modest family origins to becoming a revolutionary force in pop music. It begins by detailing the formation of the band with brothers Brian, Dennis, and Carl Wilson, their cousin Mike Love, and friend Al Jardine. The film explores the band's early days, creating a harmonious sound that became synonymous with the California dream.

As the narrative progresses, the documentary delves into the creative process behind their iconic album Pet Sounds, highlighting the influence of Brian Wilson's musical vision and the band's friendly competition with the Beatles, which spurred both groups to new heights of musical innovation, in addition to Capitol Records' hesitance to promote the album in North America. Brian attempts to follow up the album with Smile, but ends up shelving the project out of fear that nobody would understand it. The film reveals the existence of two distinct groups within the band: the recording group, led by Brian Wilson, who focused on songwriting and production, and the touring group, which performed live shows.

The documentary features interviews with surviving band members and other music industry figures, offering their subjective insights into the band's dynamics and the challenges they faced. It also touches upon the personal struggles of Brian Wilson, including his limited involvement in the band from the 1980s onward due to his conservatorship, and Dennis Wilson's connection to the Manson murders. After a string of critically acclaimed commercial duds such as Surf's Up and Holland, the compilation album Endless Summer reboots the band's image and renews their commercial success. The last thing brushed upon is the series of lawsuits between Love and Wilson that occurred in the 1990s, and the film ends on a reunion between the surviving band members.

=== Interviewees ===
- Mike Love
- Brian Wilson
- David Marks
- Al Jardine
- Josh Kun
- Don Was
- Ryan Tedder
- Marilyn Wilson-Rutherford
- Lindsey Buckingham
- Don Randi
- Janelle Monáe
- Bruce Johnston
- Blondie Chaplin

== Music ==
The Beach Boys: Music from the Documentary

Soundtrack album by The Beach Boys
- Released: May 24, 2024
- Genre: Pop rock
- Length: 97:13 (First edition); 47:53 (Second edition)
- Label: Capitol/UME
- Producers: The Beach Boys (original recordings); Daniel Nigro (Baby Blue Bathing Suit)

The Beach Boys chronology
Sail On Sailor – 1972 (2022)	The Beach Boys: Music from the Documentary (2024)	We Gotta Groove: The Brother Studio Years (2026)

Singles from The Beach Boys
- 1. "Baby Blue Bathing Suit" Released: May 16, 2024

The film's soundtrack was released digitally by Capitol/UME on May 24, 2024, the same day as the film. Alongside a collection of classic Beach Boys songs, the soundtrack also includes the original song "Baby Blue Bathing Suit" by American singer-songwriter Stephen Sanchez, which was released as a single on May 16, 2024. A reissue with a shortened track listing was released on Apple Music.

This was the last official Beach Boys release before Brian Wilson's death in June 2025.

Track listing (First release)
No.	Title	Writer(s)	Length
1.	"Don't Go Near the Water" (A Cappella)	Mike Love; Al Jardine	2:36
2.	"Fun, Fun, Fun" (Live / Remastered 2000)	Brian Wilson; Love	3:13
3.	"Their Hearts Were Full of Spring" (Demo / Mono / Remastered 2013)	Bobby Troup	2:37
4.	"Surfin'" (With Session Intro / Mono / Remastered 2013)	B. Wilson; Love	2:26
5.	"Surfin' Safari" (Original Long Version / Mono / Remastered 2013)	B. Wilson; Love	2:17
6.	"Surfin' U.S.A." (2021 Stereo Mix)	Chuck Berry; B. Wilson	2:27
7.	"Little Deuce Coupe"	B. Wilson; Roger Christian	1:40
8.	"Surfer Girl" (2021 Stereo Mix)	B. Wilson	2:28
9.	"In My Room" (2021 Stereo Mix)	B. Wilson; Gary Usher	2:17
10.	"Please Let Me Wonder" (2007 Stereo Mix / Remastered 2012)	B. Wilson; Love	2:48
11.	"Don't Worry Baby" (2021 Stereo Mix)	B. Wilson; Christian	2:51
12.	"Girl Don't Tell Me" (Remastered 2012)	B. Wilson	2:20
13.	"Do You Wanna Dance?" (2021 Stereo Mix)	Bobby Freeman	2:34
14.	"I Get Around" (2021 Stereo Mix)	B. Wilson; Love	2:13
15.	"Help Me, Rhonda" (2021 Stereo Mix)	B. Wilson; Love	2:48
16.	"California Girls" (Mono / Remastered 2001)	B. Wilson; Love	2:46
17.	"Wouldn't It Be Nice" (Remastered 2012)	B. Wilson; Tony Asher; Love	2:33
18.	"God Only Knows" (Remastered 1996)	B. Wilson; Asher	2:55
19.	"Good Vibrations" (2021 Stereo Mix)	B. Wilson; Love	3:43
20.	"You're Welcome" (2011 Smile Version)	B. Wilson	1:07
21.	"Vegatables" (Remastered 2012)	B. Wilson; Van Dyke Parks	2:10
22.	"I Can Hear Music"	Jeff Barry; Ellie Greenwich; Phil Spector	2:36
23.	"Forever"	Dennis Wilson; Gregg Jakobson	2:44
24.	"Long Promised Road"	Carl Wilson; Jack Rieley	3:32
25.	"Don't Go Near The Water" (Remastered 2009)	Love; Jardine	2:40
26.	"Here She Comes" (2022 Mix)	Ricky Fataar; Blondie Chaplin	5:10
27.	"Wild Honey" (Live at Carnegie Hall)	B. Wilson; Love	5:38
28.	"California Saga (Big Sur)" (Remastered 2009)	Love	2:56
29.	"Surfin' U.S.A." (Live)	Berry; B. Wilson	2:48
30.	"Don't Worry Baby" (Live)	B. Wilson; Christian	3:12
31.	"Good Vibrations" (Live)	B. Wilson; Love	4:48
32.	"A Day in the Life of a Tree" (Track & Backing Vocals))	B. Wilson; Rieley	2:56
33.	"Darlin'" (2021 Stereo Mix)	B. Wilson; Love	2:14
34.	"Baby Blue Bathing Suit" (Bonus Track)	Stephen Sanchez; Daniel Nigro; Amy Allen	3:15
Total length:			97:18

Track listing (Second release)

No.	Title	Writer(s)	Length
1.	"Surfin' Safari (Original Long Version / Mono / Remastered 2013)"	Brian Wilson, Mike Love	2:17
2.	"I Get Around (2021 Stereo Mix)"	B. Wilson, Roger Christian	2:13
3.	"Help Me, Rhonda (2021 Stereo Mix)"	B. Wilson, Love	2:48
4.	"Surfer Girl (2021 Stereo Mix)"	B. Wilson	2:28
5.	"Do You Wanna Dance? (2021 Stereo Mix)"	Bobby Freeman	2:34
6.	"Little Deuce Coupe"	B. Wilson, Christian	1:40
7.	"Surfin' U.S.A. (2021 Stereo Mix)"	Chuck Berry, B. Wilson	2:27
8.	"California Girls (Mono / Remastered 2001)"	B. Wilson, Love	2:46
9.	"Don't Worry Baby (2021 Stereo Mix)"	B. Wilson, Christian	2:51
10.	"In My Room (2021 Stereo Mix)"	B. Wilson, Gary Usher	2:17
11.	"Wouldn't It Be Nice (Remastered 2012)"	B. Wilson, Tony Asher, Love	2:33
12.	"God Only Knows (Remastered 1996)"	B. Wilson, Asher	2:55
13.	"Good Vibrations (2021 Stereo Mix)"	B. Wilson, Love	3:43
14.	"I Can Hear Music"	Jeff Barry, Ellie Greenwich, Phil Spector	2:36
15.	"Forever"	Dennis Wilson, Gregg Jakobson	2:44
16.	"Long Promised Road"	Carl Wilson, Jack Rieley	3:32
17.	"Darlin' (2021 Stereo Mix)"	B. Wilson, Love	2:14
18.	"Baby Blue Bathing Suit (Bonus Track)"	Stephen Sanchez, Daniel Nigro, Amy Allen	3:15
Total length:			47:53

Other songs featured in the film not included on the soundtrack album include the following:

- "Sloop John B"
- "Rag Mop" by the Ames Brothers
- "Let It Rock" by Chuck Berry
- "It's A Blue World" by the Four Freshmen
- "Long Tall Texan"
- "Be My Baby" by the Ronettes
- "Carl's Big Chance"
- "Warmth of the Sun"
- "Dance Dance Dance"
- "Baby, Please Don't Go" by Them
- "Dream Baby" by Glen Campbell
- "Salt Lake City"
- "Hang On to Your Ego"
- "I Just Wasn't Made for These Times"
- "I'm Waiting for the Day"
- "Surf's Up"
- "She Loves You" by the Beatles
- "I'm Looking Through You" by the Beatles
- "Kokomo"

|}

== Release ==
The film was released on May 24, 2024, on Disney+. Its streaming release was preceded by advance screenings in select IMAX theaters on May 21, 2024, featuring a Q&A with the filmmakers and special guests broadcast live from its premiere in Los Angeles. It is the first film to open with the "standard variant" of the 2022 Disney logo, introduced the year before for the studio's centennial anniversary.

=== Reception ===
On the review aggregator website Rotten Tomatoes, 89% of 54 critics' reviews are positive, with an average rating of 6.90/10. The critics' consensus reads that the film is "An overview of The Beach Boys' history that wraps all the essentials up in a warm blanket, The Beach Boys is a straightforward jam of greatest hits that congeals into a compelling harmony." Metacritic, which uses a weighted average, assigned the film a score of 63 out of 100, based on 11 critics, indicating "generally favorable" reviews.

One of the biggest criticisms the film faced was the omission of much of the band's history following the end of the 1970s. Brian Tallerico gave the film a two-star review on RogerEbert.com, calling the film superficial, fast, and difficult to determine who it is made for. He wrote, "The problem is that The Beach Boys too often seems content to tell the story of the band that its music has already told. A documentary should produce more than what would result from just listening to a band's collected discography." The film was also noted for not following the chronological order of the timeline of events. Writing for The New York Times, Nicolas Rapold spoke of the film's deviations from the timeline of when things really went down, saying that "the movie traces a fruitful competitive streak with the Beatles." He defended this, stating "Any deviations from the film's obligatory timeline tour are very welcome." Robert Lloyd of Los Angeles Times described the film's depiction of the band as "a swift, compact telling, with surprisingly little in the way of music and whole swaths of recording history skated over, additionally noting that "The film checks out early in their ongoing, competitive careers, before the Beach Boys became Mike Love's band and Brian a solo artist, and surprisingly omits their 50th-anniversary reunion tour and final studio album, [...] That's Why God Made the Radio.

In his review of the film for The Guardian, Alexis Petridis pointed out several missed key moments of the band's history in the film, such as Brian Wilson's relations with psychologist Eugene Landy, the many legal troubles the band got into in the 1990s, and Brian Wilson's solo career. Speaking on the omissions, he suggested that "The film would need to be twice as long to cover them, and the second half would feel more like a particularly lurid soap opera than a music documentary. But it seems more likely it's out of a desire to append a happy ending on to a story that doesn't really have one."

==== Band's response ====
Speaking for Variety, Mike Love praised the film for representing everyone, noting the film's depiction of Brian Wilson by stating that "for the end of the film, he was great. We sang together. We talked together. He was 100% present with the long-term memory and everything." In the same interview, Al Jardine compared the film's portrayal of the band's history to prior retellings, staying that "it's always a challenge because, first of all, there have been so many articles, books, movies, and I always try to find stuff that's never been seen before. But once I got to know everybody and say, "Have you got any home movies under (the bed)?" And sure enough, there'd be a shoebox with 8mm film, and that's how we got Dennis. Both Carl and Dennis's families were great in helping us represent their dad and their husband in the right way. So it was like a little treasure hunt where there's gold bullions every once in a while."

=== Accolades ===
At the 76th Primetime Creative Arts Emmy Awards, the film won the Outstanding Sound Mixing for a Nonfiction Program (Single or Multi-Camera).
