= Angel Face (album) =

Studio album by Stephen Sanchez
- Released: September 22, 2023
- Length: 39:04
- Label: Mercury; Republic
- Producer: Ian Fitchuk; Nick Lobel; Ben Schneider; Blake Slatkin; Konrad Snyder

Stephen Sanchez chronology
Easy on My Eyes (2022)	Angel Face (2023)	Dress & Tie (2025)

Singles from Angel Face
- 1. "Evangeline" Released: January 25, 2023; 2. "Only Girl" Released: April 28, 2023; 3. "Be More" Released: August 3, 2023

Alternative cover
- Deluxe version

Angel Face is the debut studio album by American singer-songwriter Stephen Sanchez, released on September 22, 2023, through Mercury and Republic Records. The album was preceded by three singles: "Evangeline", "Only Girl" and "Be More". The album also includes Sanchez's 2021 single, "Until I Found You". A deluxe version of the album was released on April 26, 2024, including five new songs.

== Background ==
Angel Face was produced by Konrad Snyder and Ian Fitchuk. The album follows a "loose concept" of a fictional version of Sanchez named "The Troubadour Sanchez" rising to fame in 1958 after performing his song "Until I Found You" before he falls in love with a woman named Evangeline, who is the girlfriend of a mob boss named Hunter, and is killed. The album was released on September 22, 2023, via Mercury and Republic Records.

Sanchez cites heavy influence from music from the 1950s and 1960s as inspiration for the album, as well as gospel music. He said of the album: "The songs fell out naturally. We started writing the record back in December, so we got to spend a lot of time with these songs, rip them apart, and put them back together again. But, I think the story came very quickly and naturally."

A deluxe version of the album titled Angel Face (Club Deluxe) was released on April 26, 2024, produced as well by Snyder and Fitchuk, and contains five new tracks. One of the new tracks, "Howling at Wolves", was inspired by Lord Huron, whose founder and lead vocalist, Ben Schneider, contributed to the production of the albums, as well as writing on various tracks. Sanchez said the bonus tracks were "lost in the ether and some of them were played during the tour without a release date in sight."

== Tour ==
Following the release of Angel Face, starting in October 2023, Sanchez went on the Live In Person tour performing the songs on the album. The tour was divided into three legs; North America, Europe, and Australia. Alongside performing songs from the album, Sanchez also performed covers of "Pretty Woman" by Roy Orbison, "Unchained Melody" by Alex North and Hy Zaret, "This Boy" by the Beatles and "Colors" by Black Pumas. The tour concluded in May 2024, following the release of Angel Face (Club Deluxe).

Then starting in August 2024, Sanchez went on The Connie Co Show Tour across North America, in which Sanchez and his band, the Moon Crests, are making their television debut on the fictional talk show The Connie Co Show. Sanchez performed the same songs as the previous tour, alongside new songs from the deluxe album, and a cover of "Put Your Head On My Shoulder" by Paul Anka, during which Sanchez would walk into the crowd. The Connie Co Show Tour concluded in October 2024.

== Critical reception ==
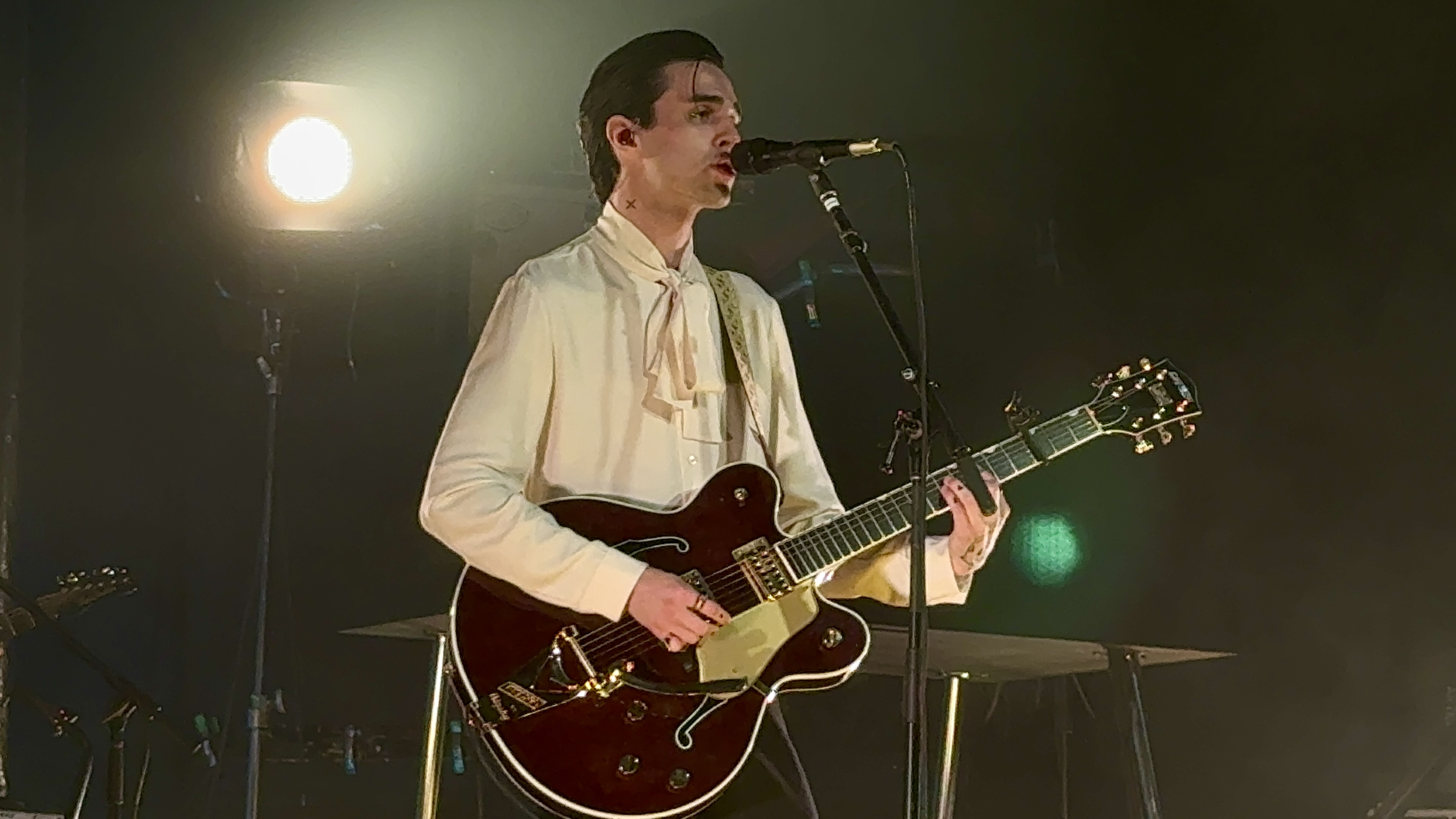
Sanchez performing at First Avenue in Minneapolis on Oct. 19, 2023.

Professional ratings
Aggregate scores
Source	Rating
Metacritic	66/100
Review scores
Source	Rating
DIY	3.5/5 stars
MusicOMH	3/5 stars
NME	3/5 stars
Sputnikmusic	2.5/5

Angel Face received a score of 66 out of 100 on review aggregator Metacritic based on six critics' reviews, indicating "generally favorable" reception. Erica Campbell of NME called the album "not only a testament to Sanchez's musicality now, but to the projected trail of success his talent will no doubt lead him on", writing that if "undeniable passion is Sanchez's medium of choice, Angel Face is his first great oeuvre".

John Murphy of MusicOMH wrote that "you'd swear you were listening to a vintage soul singer of the '50s – Sanchez's voice is absolutely stunning, and the 13 songs gathered on Angel Face are designed to show it off to its very best advantage", although "the problem with making a record that sounds like it belongs in the 1950s means that, all too often, it sounds a bit too much like pastiche". DIY's Bella Martin felt that Angel Face "fumbles as an introduction" although Sanchez's "voice is stunning, a far-reaching, emotive vibrato evoking Roy Orbison that keeps the often surface-level nature of his lyrics from reaching full saccharine".

A staff reviewer at Sputnikmusic wrote that the album "deserves some credit for possessing a small handful of excellent singles, but outside of those, this album falters almost uniformly", writing that they could "see what Stephen Sanchez was going for conceptually and aesthetically" but that "the additional eight songs add no value at best and more often than not kill whatever buzz that was generated" by the singles.

== Track listing ==
Angel Face track listing
No.	Title	Writer(s)	Length
1.	"Something About Her"	Stephen Sanchez; Ian Fitchuk	3:43
2.	"Evangeline"	Sanchez; Trent Dabbs; Nick Lobel; Bobby Russell	2:57
3.	"I Need You Most of All"	Sanchez; Fitchuk; Gabe Simon; Konrad Snyder	3:10
4.	"Only Girl"	Sanchez; Stephen Day; Fitchuk; Snyder	2:39
5.	"Be More"	Sanchez; Fitchuk; Snyder	3:51
6.	"Until I Found You"	Sanchez	2:57
7.	"Shake"	Sanchez; Day; Fitchuk; Snyder	1:54
8.	"High"	Sanchez; Anson Eggerss; Brooks Gengenbach; Jesse Houle; Watson Maack	2:41
9.	"Doesn't Do Me Any Good"	Sanchez; Fitchuk; Snyder; Daniel Tashian	3:52
10.	"No One Knows" (with Laufey)	Sanchez; Laufey; Ben Schneider	3:59
11.	"Caught in a Blue"	Sanchez; Fitchuk; Schneider; Snyder	2:59
12.	"Death of the Troubadour"	Sanchez; Fitchuk; Schneider; Snyder	1:55
13.	"Send My Heart with a Kiss"	Sanchez; Fitchuk	2:27
Total length:			39:04

Angel Face (Club Deluxe) bonus tracks
No.	Title	Writer(s)	Length
14.	"Howling at Wolves"	Sanchez	3:11
15.	"The Other Side"	Sanchez; John Ryan; Scott Harris	3:16
16.	"Emotional Vacation"	Sanchez; Fitchuk; Snyder	3:31
17.	"Fame or Fortune"	Sanchez	4:27
18.	"This Thing Called Love"	Sanchez; Fitchuk; Snyder	2:46
19.	"Until I Found You" (with Em Beihold)	Sanchez; Em Beihold	2:56
Total length:			59:21

Sample credits

- "Evangeline" contains a sample and interpolation of "Honey", by Bobby Goldsboro.

== Personnel ==
Musicians

- Stephen Sanchez – vocals (all tracks), background vocals (tracks 1, 3–5, 7–11), clapping (3), acoustic guitar (17)
- Ian Fitchuk – acoustic guitar (1, 11–13), piano (1, 3–7, 16, 18, 19), accordion (3), background vocals (3, 4, 9, 12, 13), bass guitar (3–9, 12–14, 16, 19), drums (3–9, 11, 12, 14–16, 19), electric guitar (3, 4, 6, 8, 9, 14–16), glockenspiel (3, 5, 12, 13), clapping (3), Mellotron (4, 12, 13), nylon-string guitar (12, 13), baritone guitar (12), organ (14, 15)
- Nick Lobel – acoustic guitar, bass guitar, drums, keyboards, programming (2)
- Aaron Gilbert Steele – drums (2)
- Konrad Snyder – background vocals (3–5, 9, 11), clapping (3)
- Gabe Simon – background vocals, clapping (3)
- Brooks Gengenbach – electric guitar (4, 8, 14, 15)
- Matt Combs – strings (5, 11)
- Stephen Day – background vocals (5)
- Georgia Brown – background vocals (6)
- Kyle Ryan – electric guitar (7)
- Jim Hoke – saxophone (7)
- Sarah Buxton – background vocals (8, 9, 16, 17)
- Anson Eggerss – organ (8)
- Daniel Tashian – background vocals, Mellotron, piano (9)
- Mark Barry – drums (10)
- Miguel Briseño – bass guitar (10)
- Brandon Walters – electric guitar (10)
- Tom Renaud – electric guitar (10)
- Laufey – vocals (10)
- Todd Lombardo – nylon-string guitar (11)
- John Ryan – bass guitar, drums, Wurlitzer electric piano (15)
- Josh Moore – keyboards (16)
- Jeremy Lister – background vocals (17)
- Kristen Rogers – background vocals (17)
- Em Beihold – vocals (19)

Technical

- Ian Fitchuk – production (1, 3–9, 11–19)
- Konrad Snyder – production (1, 3–9, 11–19), mixing (all tracks), engineering (1–9, 11–19)
- Blake Slatkin – production (1)
- Nick Lobel – production (2)
- Ben Schneider – production (10)
- John Ryan – production (15)
- Adam Grover – mastering (1, 3, 5–18)
- Greg Calbi – mastering (2, 4)
- Steve Fallone – mastering (2, 4)
- Nick Lobel – engineering (2)
- Mark Barry – engineering (10)

== Charts ==
Chart performance for Angel Face
Chart (2023)	Peak position
Australian Albums (ARIA)	23
Belgian Albums (Ultratop Flanders)	33
Belgian Albums (Ultratop Wallonia)	97
French Albums (SNEP)	178
New Zealand Albums (RMNZ)	20
Scottish Albums (Official Charts)	23
UK Albums (Official Charts)	64
US Billboard 200	90

== Certifications ==
Certifications for "Angel Face"
Region	Certification	Certified units/sales
New Zealand (RMNZ)	Gold	7,500^{‡}
United States (RIAA)	Gold	500,000^{‡}
^{‡} Sales+streaming figures based on certification alone.
