= Numb Little Bug =

Single by Em Beihold

from the EP Egg in the Backseat
- Released: January 28, 2022
- Recorded: 2021
- Genre: Pop
- Length: 2:49
- Label: Moon Projects; Republic
- Songwriters: Em Beihold; Nick Lopez; Dru DeCaro
- Producers: Falconry; Elijah Hill; Dallas Caton

Em Beihold singles chronology
"Groundhog Day" (2021)	"Numb Little Bug" (2022)	"Too Precious" (2022)

Music video
- "Numb Little Bug" on YouTube

"Numb Little Bug" is a song by American singer-songwriter Em Beihold, released as her major-label debut single on January 28, 2022, through Republic Records and Moon Projects, as the second single from her second EP, Egg in the Backseat. It was written by Beihold with Nick Lopez and Dru DeCaro, and produced by DeCaro, Elijah Hill and Dallas Caton. The song went viral on TikTok in early 2022, where it had been used in more than 60,000 videos by late February 2022.

== Background and release ==
Beihold wrote the song about being "numb" while taking antidepressants for anxiety, saying they "sucked the soul and energy" out of her. She shared a section of the song on TikTok in mid-2021, after which she signed with Moon Projects and released the song through Republic Records. A press release called the song a "pensive and powerful pop anthem" with "airy piano" and "bouncy verses".

== Music video ==
The song's animated lyric video was released alongside the song on January 28, 2022. The song's official music video was released on March 10, 2022.

== Charts ==
=== Weekly charts ===
Weekly chart performance for "Numb Little Bug"
Chart (2022–2023)	Peak position
Australia (ARIA)	31
Canada (Canadian Hot 100)	44
Global 200 (Billboard)	40
Ireland (IRMA)	35
Netherlands (Single Tip)	6
New Zealand (Recorded Music NZ)	31
Singapore (RIAS)	11
UK Singles (Official Charts)	25
US Billboard Hot 100	18
US Adult Contemporary (Billboard)	8
US Adult Pop Airplay (Billboard)	1
US Pop Airplay (Billboard)	6

=== Year-end charts ===
2022 year-end chart performance for "Numb Little Bug"
Chart (2022)	Position
Canada (Canadian Hot 100)	91
US Billboard Hot 100	32
US Adult Contemporary (Billboard)	17
US Adult Top 40 (Billboard)	8
US Mainstream Top 40 (Billboard)	21

2023 year-end chart performance for "Numb Little Bug"
Chart (2023)	Position
US Adult Contemporary (Billboard)	35

== Certifications ==
Certifications for "Numb Little Bug"
Region	Certification	Certified units/sales
Brazil (Pro-Música Brasil)	Gold	20,000^{‡}
Canada (Music Canada)	2× Platinum	160,000^{‡}
New Zealand (RMNZ)	Platinum	30,000^{‡}
United Kingdom (BPI)	Gold	400,000^{‡}
United States (RIAA)	Platinum	1,000,000^{‡}
^{‡} Sales+streaming figures based on certification alone.

== Release history ==
Region	Date	Format	Label	Ref.
United States	April 11, 2022	Hot adult contemporary radio	Republic	
