= Stephen Sanchez =

American singer-songwriter (born 2002)

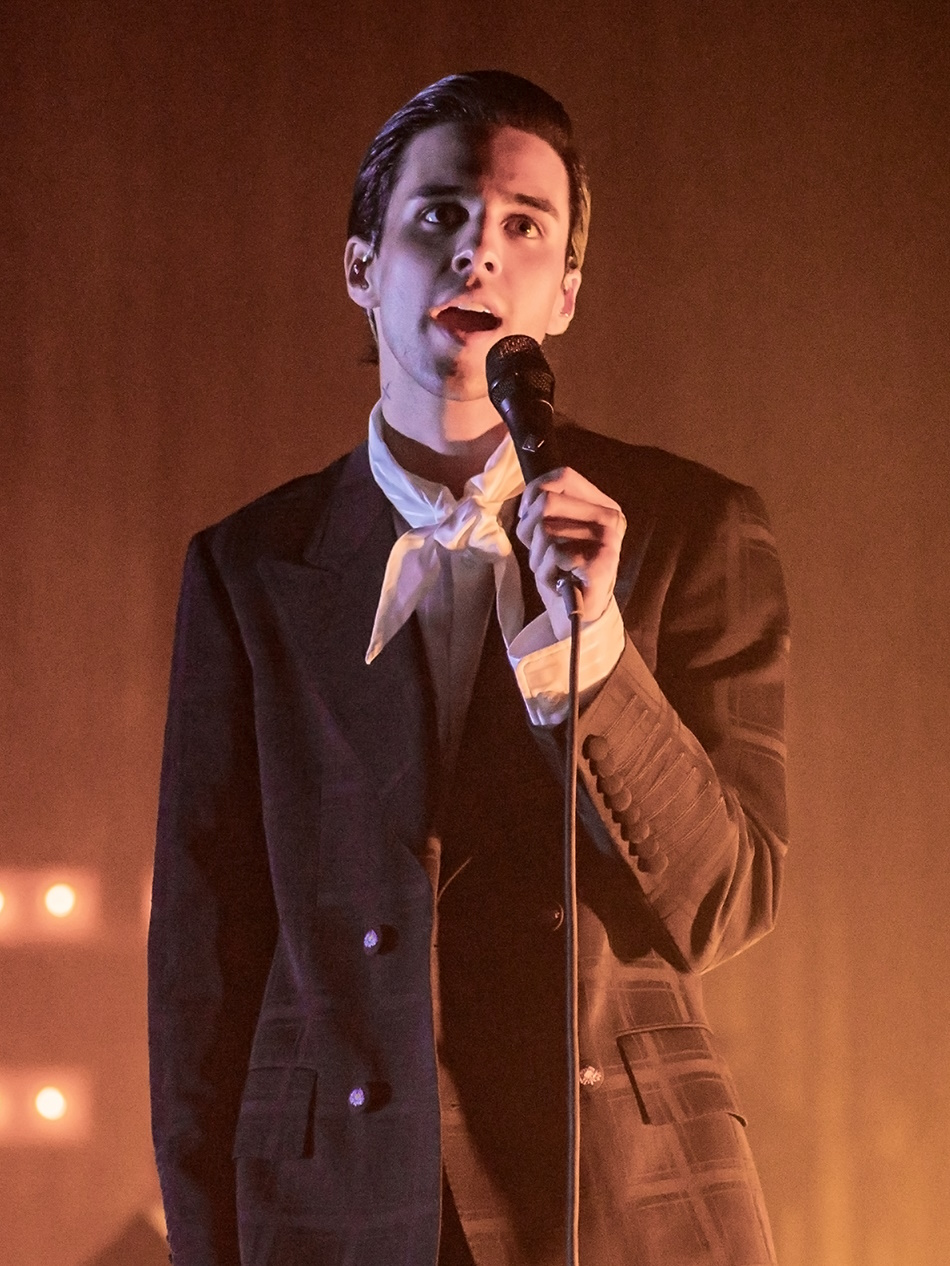
- Sanchez in 2023
- Born: Stephen Christopher Sanchez; November 3, 2002 (age 23); El Dorado Hills, California, U.S.
- Occupation: Singer-songwriter
- Years active: 2020–2026 (hiatus)
- Notable work: Discography
- Partner: Devi Tuil (engaged)
- Musical career
- Origin: Nashville, Tennessee
- Genres: Pop rock; folk-pop; brown-eyed soul; rockabilly; alternative rock
- Instruments: Vocals; guitar
- Labels: Republic; Mercury
- Website: stephensanchezofficial.com

Stephen Christopher Sanchez (born November 3, 2002) is an American singer-songwriter. Based in Nashville, Sanchez released his debut extended play What Was, Not Now in October 2021. On September 1, 2021, Sanchez released the single "Until I Found You", which peaked at No. 23 on the Billboard Hot 100, No. 8 on the Australian ARIA Chart and No. 14 on the UK Singles Chart. The song was nominated for Top Rock Song and Push Performance of the Year at the Billboard Music Awards and MTV Video Music Awards respectively, in 2023. He has also received nominations for New Artist of the Year at the iHeartRadio Music Awards and People's Choice Awards.

He has released two albums, Angel Face in September 2023, and Love, Love, Love, in May 2026. Sanchez announced a hiatus from music in June 2026 following the cancellation of his Sing Love Again Tour, citing creative burnout and disappointment with the current state of pop music.

== Early and personal life ==
Born in El Dorado Hills, California in the Sacramento metropolitan area, Sanchez's first job as a teenager was at a steakhouse in a local shopping center, and he graduated from Oak Ridge High School.

Sanchez met his fiancée Devi Tuil during one of his shows in France, and the two moved to East Nashville, where they currently reside. Sanchez proposed to Tuil on Christmas Eve 2025 at his grandparents' house.

== Career ==
In June 2020, Sanchez posted a cover of Cage the Elephant's "Cigarette Daydreams" on TikTok; he built an audience through a steady stream of content attracting over 122,000 followers on TikTok.

After he shared a snippet of "Lady by the Sea", singer-songwriter Jeremy Zucker offered to produce the official version, which was released in July 2020; as a result Sanchez signed a deal with Republic Records. He worked with producer Ian Fitchuk on his debut EP What Was, Not Now, released in October 2021.

On September 1, 2021, Sanchez released the single "Until I Found You", which peaked at No. 23 on the Billboard Hot 100, No. 8 on the Australian ARIA Chart and No. 14 on the UK Singles Chart.

On November 4, 2022, he released a single with Ashe, titled "Missing You".

On January 25, 2023, he released a single titled "Evangeline" which preceded his headline tour.

Sanchez appeared on The Tonight Show Starring Jimmy Fallon to promote the song and his headline tour. Sanchez performed his song "Evangeline" on the show. On April 28, 2023, Sanchez released his next single, titled "Only Girl".

On June 25, 2023, Sanchez appeared on stage with Elton John playing "Until I Found You" at Glastonbury 2023.

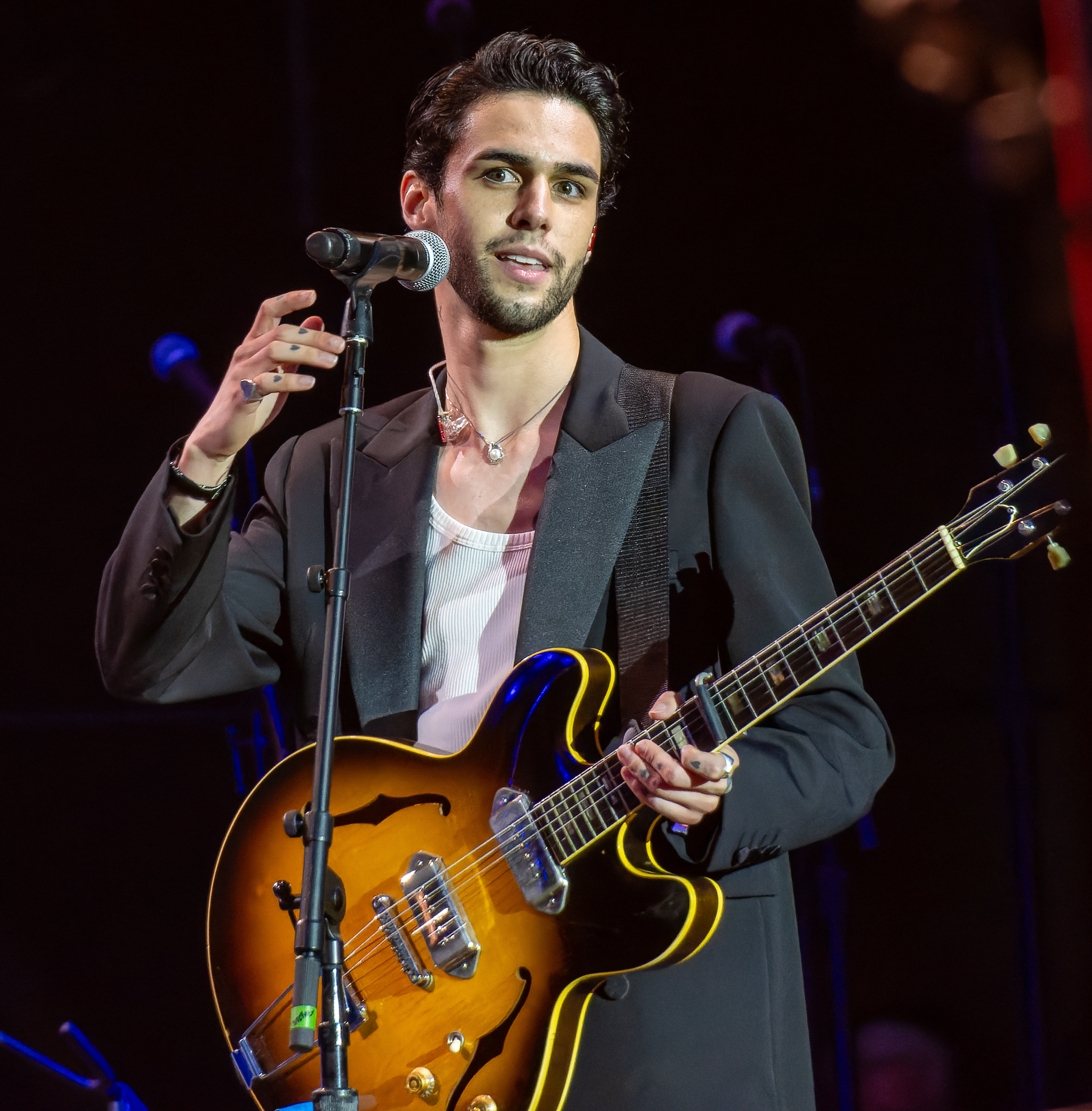
Sanchez at Glastonbury Festival 2023, performing ''Until I Found You" with Elton John.

Sanchez's debut album Angel Face was released on September 22, 2023. A deluxe version of the album, Angel Face (Club Deluxe) was announced to be released on April 26, 2024.

Sanchez sang "Baby Blue Bathing Suit" for the soundtrack of the Disney+ documentary The Beach Boys.

Sanchez is also featured on Lin-Manuel Miranda's 2024 The Warriors concept album, playing the part of Cal, a member of the Bizzies. He sings vocals in the songs "Cardigans", "We Got You" and "We Got You (Reprised)".

On November 14, 2025, Sanchez and his fiancée Devi Tuil, known mononymously as Devi, released the three-track extended play Dress & Tie, their debut extended play as the duo Dress & Tie.

On January 9, 2026, Sanchez released the single, "Sweet Love", which was accompanied by a music video. Following its release, Sanchez announced his headlining Sing Love Again Tour, which took place across Europe starting on April 25 in Paris. On March 4, 2026, Sanchez announced his second album, titled Love, Love, Love, on Instagram, which was released on May 8.

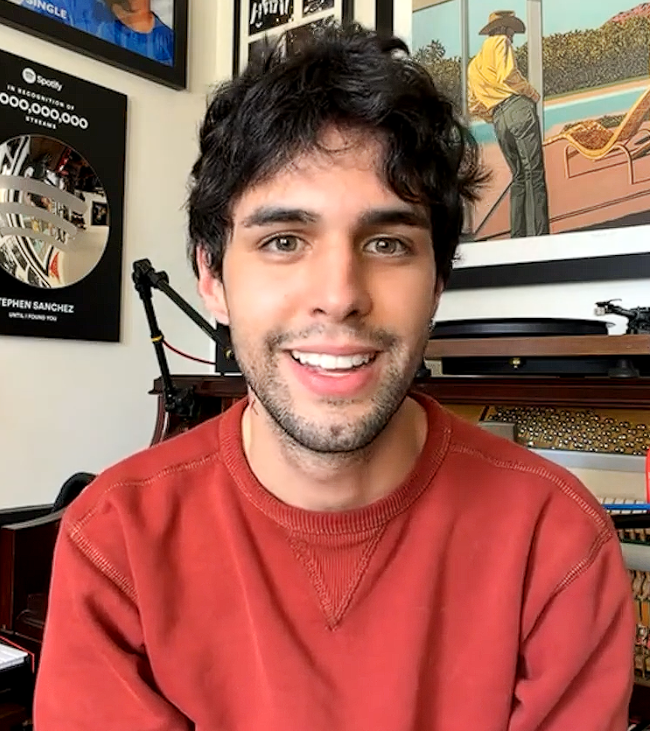
Sanchez in May 2026.

Sanchez made his debut at the Grand Ole Opry on April 11, 2026. He also performed at Capital's Summertime Ball 2026.

In June 2026, Sanchez abruptly cancelled his Sing Love Again Tour as he was due to embark on its Australian leg. In a statement posted to his Instagram page, he apologized for the cancellation and announced he would go on hiatus, stating that the negative experience he had creating his album "ruined this music" for him so much that he "wanted to quit making music all together." Sanchez then expressed his frustration with the popular music industry at large, saying some of the music he heard had "disgusting, heavily pornographic lyrics, nothing driving people to do anything", which left him feeling "depressed as an artist". He also cited the need to "be on social media everyday" to maintain popularity as a reason for his hiatus. Sanchez ended the statement by saying he would return once he created a space to "make the art that I want to make and promote it in a way that feels restful for me."

== Style ==
Sanchez's style on Angel Face is very reminiscent of music from the 1950s and 1960s, which is an era of music he has cited heavily influenced him from a young age. His song "Evangeline", released in 2023, contains a sample from Bobby Goldsboro's "Honey", released in 1968. His earlier EPs, What Was, Not Now and Easy On My Eyes, are more singer-songwriter, with a heavier emphasis on acoustic instruments than the 1950s/1960s rock of Angel Face.

Sanchez described wanting to depart from the '50s/'60s rock of Angel Face for his future work. His studio album Love, Love, Love has been described as "a technicolor pop record with a bright sound". Sanchez describes the album as a bigger reflection into his own life and stories than Angel Face.

== Discography ==
=== Studio albums ===
- Angel Face (2023)
- Love, Love, Love (2026)

== Awards and nominations ==
Awards	Year	Recipient(s) and nominee(s)	Category	Result	Ref.
Nickelodeon Kids' Choice Awards	2023	Sanchez	Favorite Social Music Star	Nominated	
MTV Video Music Awards	2023	"Until I Found You"	Push Performance of The Year	Nominated	
Billboard Music Awards	2023	Sanchez	Top Rock Artist	Nominated	
Billboard Music Awards	2023	"Until I Found You"	Top Rock Song	Nominated	
People's Choice Awards	2024	Sanchez	New Artist Of The Year	Nominated	
iHeartRadio Music Awards	2024	Sanchez	Best New Pop Artist	Nominated	

== Tours ==
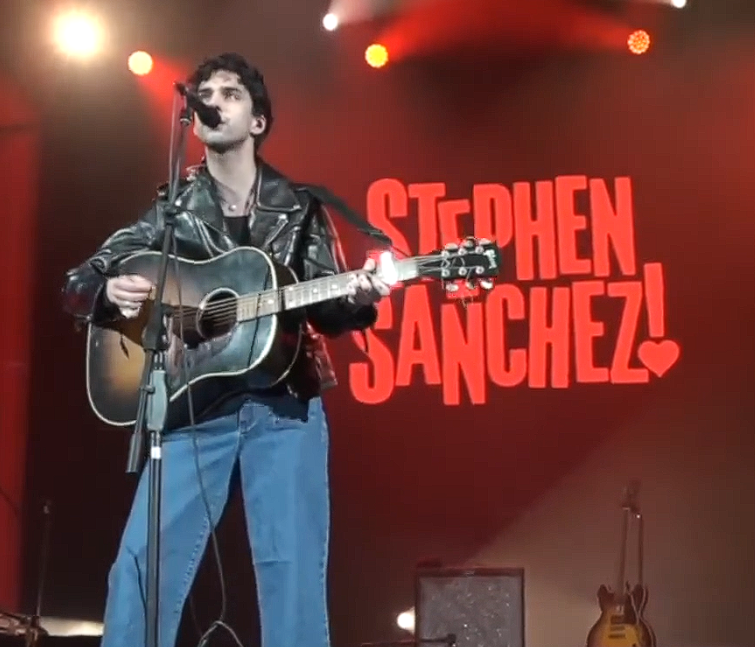
Sanchez performing at Java Jazz Festival in Jakarta, Indonesia, in 2023.

=== Headlining ===
- Stephen Sanchez and His Band Live! (2023)
- Live in Person (2023-24)
- The Connie Co Show Tour (2024)
- Sing Love Again Tour (2026)
