= Until I Found You =

2021 single by Stephen Sanchez

Single by Stephen Sanchez

from the EP Easy on My Eyes and the album Angel Face
- Released: September 1, 2021
- Genre: Pop-soul; doo-wop; blue-eyed soul
- Length: 2:57
- Label: Republic; Mercury
- Songwriter: Stephen Sanchez
- Producers: Ian Fitchuk; Konrad Snyder

Stephen Sanchez singles chronology
"Kayla" (2021)	"Until I Found You" (2021)	"2000 Miles" (2022)

Alternative cover
- Remix version featuring Em Beihold

Em Beihold singles chronology
"Too Precious" (2022)	"Until I Found You (remix)" (2022)	"Roller Coasters Make Me Sad" (2023)

Music video
- "Until I Found You" on YouTube

"Until I Found You" is the breakout single of American singer-songwriter Stephen Sanchez. It was released on September 1, 2021, as the lead single from Sanchez's second extended play Easy on My Eyes and debut album Angel Face. Written by Sanchez and produced by Ian Fitchuk and Konrad Snyder, the song, along with its remix version featuring American singer Em Beihold, has garnered over one billion streams on Spotify, and peaked at number 23 on the Billboard Hot 100, number 8 on the Australian ARIA chart and at number 14 on the UK Singles Chart.

== Background ==
Originally released on September 1, 2021, by Republic Records and Mercury Records, the song received viral support on TikTok. Sanchez explained that the address "Georgia" refers to his girlfriend at the time, with whom he was in a long-distance relationship. He explains that he felt so undeserving of her love that he "pushed her away". The pair ended up reconnecting, but Sanchez says the song was written during the period when he had "lost her". The chorus line "I would never fall in love again until I found her" according to Sanchez, was him acknowledging that he would likely never find anyone else like her, and that he didn't want to "try and conjure up something similar or try and find someone similar…because it just would never happen."

A piano version of the song was released on March 11, 2022. On April 22, 2022, a remix of the song was released along with fellow American singer-songwriter Em Beihold.

== Live performances ==
Sanchez performed the song on Late Night with Seth Meyers in May 2022, on The Late Show with Stephen Colbert in June 2022, and in February 2023 with Beihold on The Late Late Show with James Corden.

At Glastonbury 2023, during the Sunday headline slot, Sanchez performed the song with Elton John.

In February 2024, Sanchez performed the song on America's Got Talent: Fantasy League with America's Got Talent season 14 winner & Fantasy League member Kodi Lee.

== Composition ==
The track is composed in the key of B-flat major with a time signature of 12/8, and follows a tempo of 68 dotted crotchet beats (dotted quarter notes, 102 in normal quarter notes) per minute.

== Music video ==
Sanchez and Jeri Mae James singing with each other in the music video for "Until I Found You".

The music video was officially uploaded to Sanchez's YouTube channel on June 29, 2022. The synopsis of the music video sees Sanchez singing in a convertible car while a Marilyn Monroe-esque ingenue (Jeri Mae James) sits on the back of the car before switching scenes on a TV set.

== Use in other media ==
In 2023, the remix version of the song featuring Em Beihold was featured in two episodes of season 2 of the series Ginny & Georgia. It was also used in an episode of season 3 of series Superman & Lois. The song is used in the trailer for Nicola Peltz's 2024 film Lola.

On February 10, 2023, Korean-New Zealand singer Rosé from South Korean girl group Blackpink released a cover of the song in honor of her birthday. The cover peaked at number one on Billboard's Hot Trending Songs chart, and the original version concurrently rose 8% in U.S. streams during the same week.

The song will be featured in the third season of Percy Jackson and the Olympians as Percy and Annabeth share a slow dance.

== Charts ==
=== Weekly charts ===
2022–2024 Weekly chart performance for "Until I Found You"
Chart (2022–2024)	Peak position
Australia (ARIA)	8
Austria (Ö3 Austria Top 40)	33
Belgium (Ultratop 50 Flanders)	2
Belgium (Ultratop 50 Wallonia)	10
Canada (Canadian Hot 100)	15
Czech Republic Singles Digital (ČNS IFPI)	56
Denmark (Tracklisten)	35
Estonia Airplay (TopHit) Version with Em Beihold	82
France (SNEP)	111
Germany (GfK)	52
Global 200 (Billboard)	11
Hungary (Single Top 40)	25
India International (IMI)	1
Indonesia (Billboard)	2
Ireland (IRMA)	13
Lebanon (Lebanese Top 20) Version with Em Beihold	10
Lithuania (AGATA) Version with Em Beihold	27
Lithuania Airplay (TopHit) Version with Em Beihold	44
Luxembourg (Billboard)	22
Malaysia International (RIM)	1
MENA (IFPI)	17
Netherlands (Dutch Top 40)	16
Netherlands (Single Top 100)	14
New Zealand (Recorded Music NZ)	13
Norway (VG-lista)	13
Philippines (Billboard)	3
Poland (Polish Streaming Top 100)	78
Portugal (AFP)	14
Singapore (RIAS)	4
Slovakia Singles Digital (ČNS IFPI)	27
Sweden (Sverigetopplistan)	15
Switzerland (Schweizer Hitparade)	23
Turkey International Airplay (Radiomonitor Türkiye)	7
UK Singles (Official Charts)	14
US Billboard Hot 100	23
US Adult Contemporary (Billboard)	13
US Adult Pop Airplay (Billboard)	5
US Hot Rock & Alternative Songs (Billboard)	1
US Pop Airplay (Billboard)	10
Vietnam (Vietnam Hot 100)	11

2025 weekly chart performance for "Until I Found You"
Chart (2025)	Peak position
Israel International Airplay (Media Forest)	17

2026 weekly chart performance for "Until I Found You"
Chart (2026)	Peak position
Israel International Airplay (Media Forest)	20
Norway Airplay (IFPI Norge)	86

=== Monthly charts ===
Monthly chart performance for "Until I Found You"
Chart (2023)	Peak position
Czech Republic (Singles Digitál – Top 100)	61
Lithuania Airplay (TopHit)	61
Slovakia (Singles Digitál – Top 100)	50

=== Year-end charts ===
2022 year-end chart performance for "Until I Found You"
Chart (2022)	Position
Canada (Canadian Hot 100)	100
Global 200 (Billboard)	122
India International Singles (IMI)	11
Portugal (AFP)	104
US Hot Rock & Alternative Songs (Billboard)	14
Vietnam (Vietnam Hot 100)	51

2023 year-end chart performance for "Until I Found You"
Chart (2023)	Position
Australia (ARIA)	17
Belgium (Ultratop 50 Flanders)	18
Belgium (Ultratop 50 Wallonia)	30
Canada (Canadian Hot 100)	32
Global 200 (Billboard)	13
Global Singles (IFPI)	14
Lithuania Airplay (TopHit)	96
Netherlands (Dutch Top 40)	67
Netherlands (Single Top 100)	28
New Zealand (Recorded Music NZ)	26
Sweden (Sverigetopplistan)	69
Switzerland (Schweizer Hitparade)	85
UK Singles (OCC)	39
US Billboard Hot 100	50
US Adult Contemporary (Billboard)	30
US Adult Top 40 (Billboard)	24
US Hot Rock & Alternative Songs (Billboard)	4

2024 year-end chart performance for "Until I Found You"
Chart (2024)	Position
Global 200 (Billboard)	56
India International (IMI)	4

2025 year-end chart performance for "Until I Found You"
Chart (2025)	Position
Global 200 (Billboard)	145

== Certifications ==
Certifications for "Until I Found You"
Region	Certification	Certified units/sales
Australia (ARIA) Remix version	7× Platinum	490,000^{‡}
Brazil (Pro-Música Brasil)	3× Diamond	480,000^{‡}
Canada (Music Canada)	5× Platinum	400,000^{‡}
Denmark (IFPI Danmark)	Platinum	90,000^{‡}
France (SNEP)	Diamond	333,333^{‡}
Germany (BVMI)	Gold	300,000^{‡}
Italy (FIMI)	Platinum	100,000^{‡}
New Zealand (RMNZ)	4× Platinum	120,000^{‡}
Poland (ZPAV)	3× Platinum	150,000^{‡}
Portugal (AFP)	3× Platinum	30,000^{‡}
Spain (Promusicae)	Platinum	60,000^{‡}
Switzerland (IFPI Switzerland)	Platinum	20,000^{‡}
United Kingdom (BPI)	2× Platinum	1,200,000^{‡}
United States (RIAA)	4× Platinum	4,000,000^{‡}
^{‡} Sales+streaming figures based on certification alone.
