= Sweet Love (Stephen Sanchez song) =

Single by Stephen Sanchez

from the album Love, Love, Love
- B-side: "Love, Love, Love"
- Released: January 9, 2026
- Studio: House Mouse Studios, Stockholm, Sweden
- Length: 2:26
- Label: Mercury
- Songwriters: Stephen Sanchez; Oscar Görres

Stephen Sanchez singles chronology
"Silver Bells" (2024)	"Sweet Love" (2026)	"Love, Love, Love" (2026)

Music video
- "Sweet Love" on YouTube

Alternative cover
- 7" vinyl issue

"Sweet Love" (Note: Stylized in all caps.) is a song by American singer-songwriter Stephen Sanchez, released on January 9, 2026, through Mercury Records. The single was released as a part of Sanchez's second studio album Love, Love, Love. The single peaked at number 32 on the UK Physical Singles Chart, and has amassed over 5 million streams.

== Background ==
"Sweet Love" would be the first single Sanchez would release in over a year, following his rendition of the holiday song "Silver Bells" in 2024, and his first work since his collaborative extended-play Dress & Tie with his fiancée, French singer-songwriter Devi, as the duet Dress & Tie, released in 2025.

The song was written and composed by Sanchez and Swedish producer Oscar Görres, and recorded at House Mouse Studios in Stockholm, Sweden. The single was released on January 9, 2026, via Mercury Records.

Sanchez performed "Sweet Love" on Good Morning America's Oscars After Party broadcast on March 16, 2026.

== Music video ==
Sanchez and his grandparents in the music video for "Sweet Love".

An accompanying music video, directed by Jason Lester, was released on the same day the song released, featuring Sanchez' grandparents, whose northern California home the video was filmed in, and at which Sanchez proposed to his fiancée.

== Track listing ==
7" vinyl single

A. "Sweet Love" – 2:26
B. "Love, Love, Love" – 4:02

== Credits and personnel ==
Credits adapted from the album notes on the "Sweet Love" 7" vinyl, and Spotify.

- Stephen Sanchez – lead vocals, background vocals, songwriting
- Oscar Görres – production, recording, programming, drums, percussion, bass, guitars, keyboards, piano
- Günter Görres – saxophone
- Randy Merrill – mastering
- Serban Ghenea – mixing
- Bryce Bordone – mixing

== Chart performance ==
Chart (2026)	Peak position
UK Physical Singles (OCC)	35
