= Em Beihold =

American singer-songwriter (born 1999)

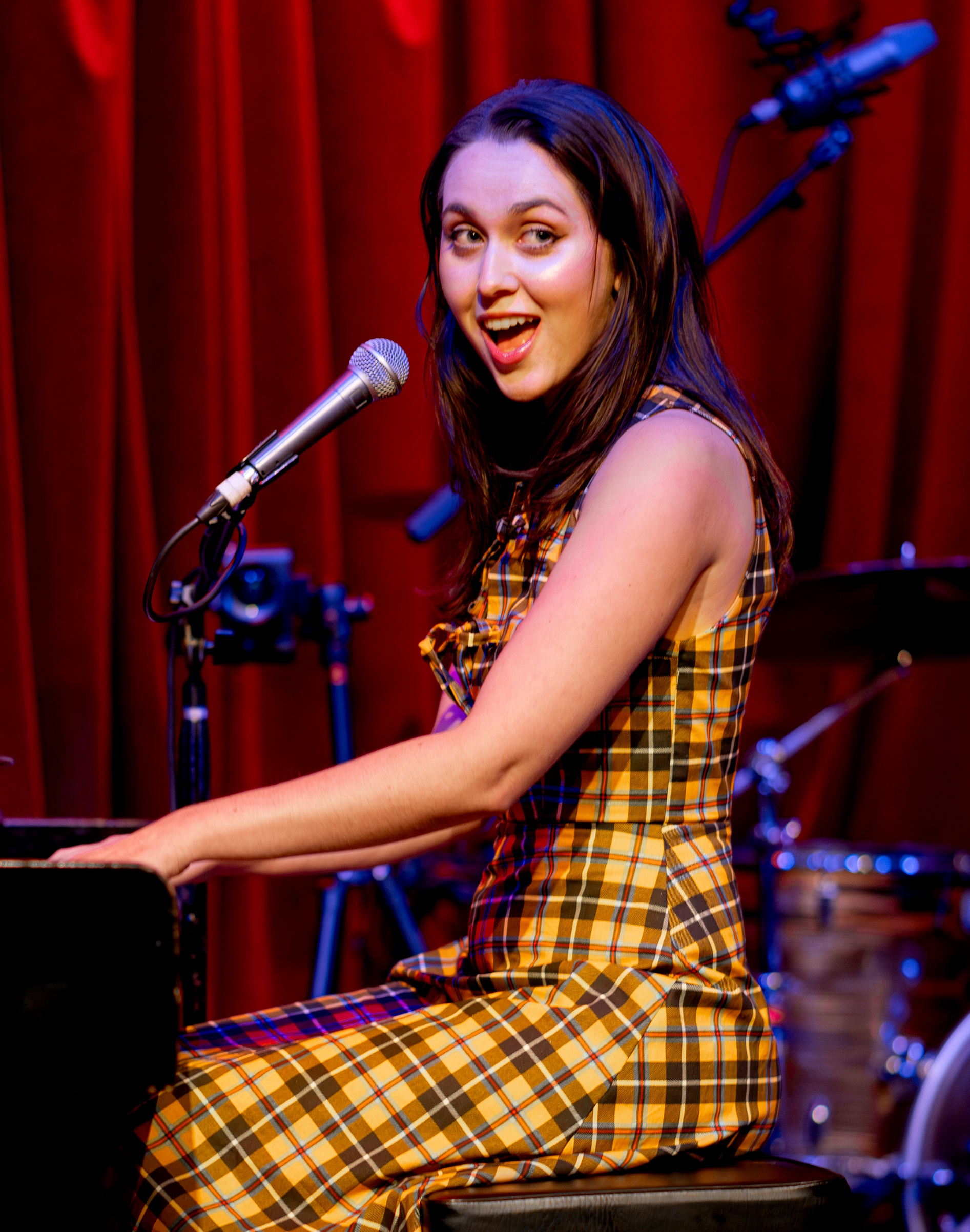
- Beihold in 2025

Background information
- Born: Emily Mahin Beihold; January 21, 1999 (age 27)
- Origin: Los Angeles, California, U.S.
- Genre: Pop
- Occupation: Singer-songwriter
- Instruments: Vocals; piano
- Years active: 2017–present
- Labels: Moon Projects; Republic
- Website: embeihold.com

Emily Mahin Beihold (/ˈbaɪhoʊld/; born January 21, 1999) is an American singer-songwriter. She released her debut EP Infrared in 2017. After signing to Republic Records in 2021, she released her major-label debut single "Numb Little Bug" in 2022, which brought her widespread recognition. The same year, she released her second EP, Egg in the Backseat. Her debut album, Tales of a Failed Shapeshifter, was released on February 27, 2026.

== Early life and education ==
Emily Mahin Beihold was born on January 21, 1999, and grew up in Los Angeles. Her mother, Zahra Dowlatabadi, immigrated from Iran to the United States during the Iranian Revolution in the late 70s. At the age of six, Beihold saw a piano in a shop window and begged her parents to let her learn the piano; she began writing songs when she was seven. Her first song was a patriotic song, "America Home".

In 2017, Beihold enrolled at the University of California, San Diego and competed in the NCAA Fencing Championships receiving NCAA All-American Honors in 2019.

== Career ==
=== 2017–2021: Infrared and early singles ===
Beihold self-released her debut EP, titled Infrared, on May 11, 2017. For the film I'm Not Here, director Michelle Schumacher invited Beihold to write a track for the film. She wrote the song, "Not Who We Were", which is included on the EP.

After the EP's release, she released a string of singles and gained attention on the social media platform TikTok for her song "City of Angels". On May 28, 2021, Beihold released her song "Groundhog Day", which also gained popularity via TikTok.

=== 2022–2024: Egg in the Backseat and stand-alone singles ===
After gaining attention on social media, she signed with Republic Records, with whom she released her major-label single, "Numb Little Bug" on January 28, 2022. It would serve as the lead single off of her upcoming second EP. The song peaked at #18 on the Billboard Hot 100 and has been certified platinum by the RIAA. On April 22, 2022, Stephen Sanchez released a remix of his lead single, "Until I Found You", featuring her. The song peaked at #23 on the Billboard Hot 100 and has been certified 4× Platinum by the RIAA. On May 20, 2022, she released the second single off the upcoming EP titled "Too Precious". On July 22, 2022, Egg in the Backseat, her second EP, was released. It explored themes of her mental health problems and her relationships. Five days later, she signed to Sony Music Publishing.

During this time, Beihold began touring by opening for AJR for their show in Cincinnati on May 17, 2022. She also opened for King Princess for her tour later that year. She performed before the Jonas Brothers during the AT&T Playoff Playlist Live! event in Los Angeles on January 7, 2023. Shortly after, she opened for Lewis Capaldi for his tour. That same year, she opened for Imagine Dragons for a show of their tour on July 15, 2023, as part of TC Summer Fest in Minneapolis. After her EP, she released three stand-alone singles: "Roller Coasters Make Me Sad" on February 24, 2023, "Pedestal" on October 12, 2023, and "Maybe Life Is Good" on February 9, 2024. Throughout February and March of that year, she embarked on the Maybe Life Is Good Tour, her first tour as a headlining act.

=== 2025–present: Tales of a Failed Shapeshifter ===
After taking a year off due to mental health issues, Beihold would begin showcasing material off of her upcoming debut studio album in early 2025. Part of this was done through a mini tour, the Super Small Semi-Secret Piano Tour, which ran in April of that year. A few months later, she began releasing singles over the course of several weeks, which would serve as the lead singles of the record. These included "Brutus" on July 18, 2025, "Hot Goblin" on September 5, 2025, and "Scared of the Dark" on October 24, 2025. Shortly into the new year, she announced the title of her album Tales of a Failed Shapeshifter, the tracklist and its release date of February 27, 2026. She embarked on the first leg of a headlining tour for the album throughout May and June. The second leg is set to begin at the end of October and last throughout the month of November.

== Musical influences ==
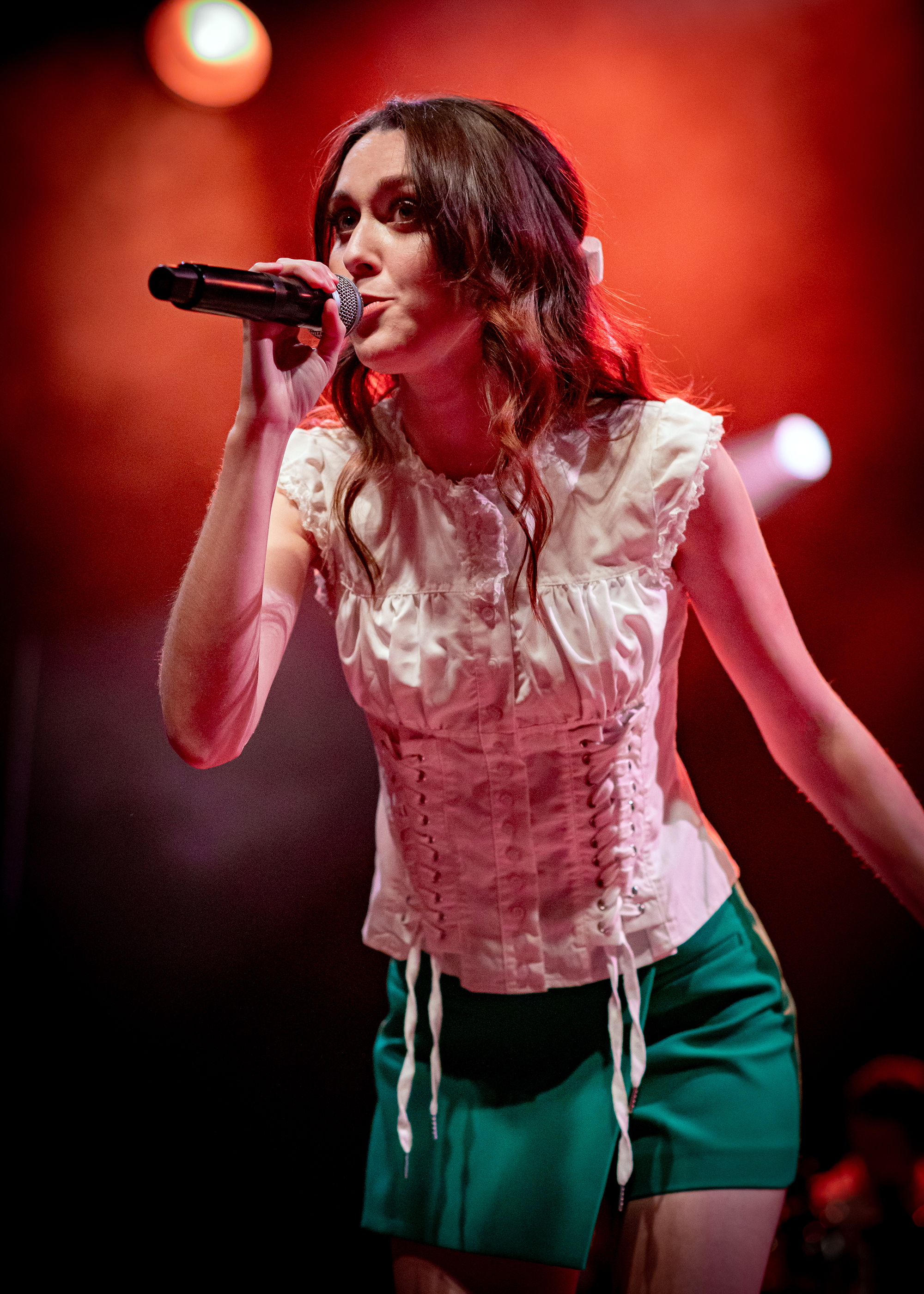
Beihold performing in 2024

Beihold grew up listening to Feist, Fiona Apple, Kate Nash, Sara Bareilles, and Lily Allen, and cites Queen and Regina Spektor as among her influences.

== Discography ==
=== Studio albums ===
List of studio albums, with selected details
Title	Album details
Tales of a Failed Shapeshifter	Released: February 27, 2026; Label: Republic; Formats: Digital download, streaming, LP

=== Extended plays ===
List of EPs, with selected details
Title	EP details
Infrared	Released: May 11, 2017; Label: Self-released; Formats: Digital download, streaming
Egg in the Backseat	Released: July 22, 2022; Label: Republic; Formats: Digital download, streaming, LP

=== Singles ===
List of singles, with year released, selected chart positions, and album name shown
Title	Year	Peak chart positions						Certifications	Album
Title	Year	US	AUS	CAN	NZ	UK	WW	Certifications	Album
"Infrared" (Neanderthal remix)	2018	—	—	—	—	—	—		Infrared
"Blink of an Eye"	2019	—	—	—	—	—	—		Non-album singles
"Forgive Yourself"	2020	—	—	—	—	—	—		Non-album singles
"City of Angels"	2020	—	—	—	—	—	—		Non-album singles
"Painful Truth"	2020	—	—	—	—	—	—		Non-album singles
"Drive by Lovers" (featuring Peachy King)	2021	—	—	—	—	—	—		Non-album singles
"Nobody Else"	2021	—	—	—	—	—	—		Non-album singles
"Groundhog Day"	2021	—	—	—	—	—	—		Non-album singles
"Numb Little Bug"	2022	18	31	44	31	25	40	RIAA: Platinum; BPI: Gold; MC: 2× Platinum; RMNZ: Platinum	Egg in the Backseat
"Too Precious"	2022	—	—	—	—	—	—		Egg in the Backseat
"Until I Found You" (with Stephen Sanchez)	2022	23	8	—	13	—	—	RIAA: 4× Platinum; ARIA: 7× Platinum; RMNZ: 2× Platinum	Non-album singles
"Roller Coasters Make Me Sad"	2023	—	—	—	—	—	—		Non-album singles
"Pedestal"	2023	—	—	—	—	—	—		Non-album singles
"Fantasy" (with Lauren Spencer Smith and Gayle)	2023	—	—	—	— (Note: "Fantasy" did not enter the NZ Top 40 Singles Chart, but peaked at number 12 on the NZ Hot Singles Chart.)	—	—		Mirror
"Phone" (with Meduza and Sam Tompkins)	2023	—	—	—	—	—	—		Non-album singles
"House on a Hill" (with Eric Nam)	2023	—	—	—	—	—	—		Non-album singles
"Maybe Life Is Good"	2024	—	—	—	—	—	—		Non-album singles
"The Bird Song" (featuring Noah Floersch)	2024	—	—	—	—	—	—		Non-album singles
"Brutus"	2025	—	—	—	—	—	—		Tales of a Failed Shapeshifter
"Hot Goblin"	2025	—	—	—	—	—	—		Tales of a Failed Shapeshifter
"Scared of the Dark"	2025	—	—	—	—	—	—		Tales of a Failed Shapeshifter
"—" denotes a single that did not chart or was not released in that territory.

== Tours ==
=== Headlining ===
- Maybe Life Is Good Tour (2024)
- Super Small Semi-Secret Piano Tour (2025)
- Tales of a Failed Shapeshifter Tour (2026)

=== Opening act ===
- AJR - OK Orchestra Tour (2022)
- King Princess - Hold on Baby Tour (2022)
- Jonas Brothers - AT&T Playoff Playlist Live! (2023)
- Lewis Capaldi - Broken by Desire to Be Heavenly Sent Tour (2023)
- Imagine Dragons - Mercury World Tour (2023)
