= Let It Go (Josh Nelson album) =

Studio album by Josh Nelson
- Released: September 25, 2007
- Genre: Jazz
- Length: 59:20
- Label: Native Language Music
- Producer: Josh Nelson, Erik Kertes

Josh Nelson chronology
| Anticipation (2004) | Let It Go (2007) | I Hear a Rhapsody (2009) |

Professional ratings
Review scores
| Source | Rating |
|---|---|
| Allmusic | 3.5/5 stars |

Let It Go is the third studio album by jazz pianist Josh Nelson. It was released by Native Language Music on September 25, 2007.

== Track listing ==
All music is composed by Josh Nelson, except noted.

| No. | Title | Length |
|---|---|---|
| 1. | "Loose End" | 5:34 |
| 2. | "Introspection on 401" | 7:03 |
| 3. | "Love Letters" (Edward Heyman, Victor Young) | 6:02 |
| 4. | "Leaving Here" | 5:40 |
| 5. | "Tears in the Morning" (Bruce Johnston) | 5:44 |
| 6. | "Abandon Post" (Eric Kertes) | 5:32 |
| 7. | "Colors" | 7:45 |
| 8. | "Julia" (Ben Wendel) | 4:38 |
| 9. | "Deep Breaths" | 4:04 |
| 10. | "Let It Go" | 7:18 |

== Personnel ==
- Josh Nelson - Acoustic Piano, Rhodes, Hammond C-3 organ, Glockenspiel
- Darek "Oles" Oleszkiewicz - Acoustic Bass
- Matt Wilson - Drums, Percussion
- Seamus Blake - Tenor Saxophone
- Sara Gazarek - Vocals (on track 4)
- Anthony Wilson - Guitars
- Supernova String Quintet - Strings (on tracks 4 & 7)
- Robert Anderson - Violin
- Reiko Nakano - Violin
- Miguel Atwood-Ferguson - Viola
- Jacob Szekely - Cello
