= Yours (Sara Gazarek album) =

Studio album by Sara Gazarek
- Released: August 23, 2005
- Genre: Jazz
- Length: 51:03
- Label: Native Language
- Producer: John Clayton, Jr.

Sara Gazarek chronology
Yours (2005)	Live at the Jazz Bakery (2006)

Professional ratings
Review scores
Source	Rating
Allmusic	3/5 stars

Yours is the studio album by jazz vocalist Sara Gazarek. Gazarek's debut album was released by Native Language Music on August 23, 2005. The album peaked at number 10 on Billboard Top Jazz Albums chart.

== Track listing ==
No.	Title	Writer(s)	Length
1.	"My Shining Hour"	Harold Arlen, Johnny Mercer	3:13
2.	"Yours"	Josh Nelson	4:03
3.	"Amazing"	Nelson	5:11
4.	"Ev'ry Time We Say Goodbye"	Cole Porter	3:41
5.	"Cheek to Cheek"	Irving Berlin	3:57
6.	"You Got By"	Sara Gazarek, Erik Kertes	4:26
7.	"Blackbird/Bye Bye Blackbird"	Lennon–McCartney/Mort Dixon, Ray Henderson	5:55
8.	"The Circle Game"	Joni Mitchell	5:07
9.	"All or Nothing at All"	Arthur Altman, Jack Lawrence	6:53
10.	"Too Young to Go Steady"	Harold Adamson, Jimmy McHugh	4:59
11.	"You Are My Sunshine"	Jimmie Davis, Charles Mitchell	3:35

== Personnel ==
- Sara Gazarek - Vocal
- Erik Kertes - Bass
- Josh Nelson - Piano
- Matt Slocum - Drums

== Charts ==
Album
Year	Chart	Position
2005	Top Jazz Albums	10
