= Return to You =

Studio album by Sara Gazarek
- Released: June 5, 2007
- Genre: Jazz
- Length: 52:38
- Label: Native Language
- Producer: John Clayton, Jr.

Sara Gazarek chronology
Live at the Jazz Bakery (2006)	Return to You (2007)	Blossom & Bee (2012)

Professional ratings
Review scores
Source	Rating
Allmusic	4/5 stars

Return to You is the second studio album by jazz singer Sara Gazarek. The album was released by Native Language Music on June 5, 2007. The album contains popular songs (Folk, Pop, Rock, Country), jazz tunes from 90's, and originals written by pianist Josh Nelson.

== Track listing ==
No.	Title	Writer(s)	Length
1.	"Let's Try This Again"	Josh Nelson, Sara Gazarek	3:42
2.	"Northern Lights"	Seamus Blake	4:16
3.	"Carey"	Joni Mitchell	4:53
4.	"Junk"	Paul McCartney	3:26
5.	"Just Let Be Me"	Nelson	3:54
6.	"Give Me Back That Old Familiar Feeling"	Bill C. Graham	4:31
7.	"And So It Goes"	Billy Joel	5:12
8.	"I've Got a Great Idea"	Harry Connick, Jr.	3:03
9.	"Dear Someone"	Gillian Welch, David Rawlings	3:29
10.	"Hallelujah"	Leonard Cohen	5:35
11.	"Makes Me Feel This Way"	Nelson	3:52
12.	"Without You"	Nelson	4:49
13.	"Original 4"	Ludvig Girdland	1:48

== Personnel ==
- Sara Gazarek - Vocal
- Josh Nelson - Piano, Hammond B-3, Glockenspiel
- Erik Kertes - Acoustic Bass, Guitar, Guitarlele
- Matt Slocum - Drums
- Seamus Blake - Tenor Saxophone, Guitar, Vocal (on track 2)
- Ambrose Akinmusire - Trumpet (on track 5)
- John Proulx - Vocal (on track 9)
- Supernova String Quintet - Strings (on tracks 4, 12, 13)
- Paul Cartwright - Violin
- Robert Anderson - Violin
- Miguel Atwood-Ferguson - Viola
- Jacob Szekely - Cello

== Charts ==
Chart (2007)	Peak position
US Top Jazz Albums	20
