= Blossom & Bee =

Studio album by Sara Gazarek
- Released: June 19, 2012
- Recorded: October 26–28, 2011
- Genre: Jazz
- Length: 55:48
- Label: Palmetto
- Producer: Larry Goldings

Sara Gazarek chronology
| Return to You (2007) | Blossom & Bee (2012) |

Blossom & Bee is a studio album by American jazz singer Sara Gazarek released on June 19, 2012, by Palmetto Records. All the tracks are cover versions except "Blossom & Bee", which Gazarek wrote with producer Larry Goldings and Bill DeMain, and "Fly Away Birdie" which she wrote with pianist Josh Nelson. Seven of the twelve songs on the album have been recorded by Blossom Dearie. The album debuted at No. 18 on the Billboard jazz album chart.

== Critical reception ==
Blossom & Bee received positive reviews. C. Michael Bailey from All About Jazz wrote "truly exceptional ... an inventive coupling of the old and new". Brent Black from CriticalJazz gave five stars, writing: "A flawless recording by all participants, and easily one of the most impressive releases of the year, across any genre. 5 huge stars!" Andrea Canter from Jazz Police praised the album "if Sara Gazarek's earlier recordings signaled the potential of a mighty talent, then her latest confirms her place at the top". Mark S. Tucker from FAME wrote "get in on the secret before it ignites a wave of astonished approval from all corners".

== Track listing ==
| No. | Title | Writer(s) | Length |
|---|---|---|---|
| 1. | "Ev'rything I've Got" | Richard Rodgers, Lorenz Hart | 3:26 |
| 2. | "Blossom & Bee" | Larry Goldings, Sara Gazarek, Bill DeMain | 3:36 |
| 3. | "Fly Away Birdie" | Gazarek, Josh Nelson | 4:31 |
| 4. | "The Luckiest" | Ben Folds | 4:19 |
| 5. | "Down with Love" | Harold Arlen, E. Y. "Yip" Harburg | 4:46 |
| 6. | "Lucky to Be Me" | Leonard Bernstein, Betty Comden, Adolph Green | 5:33 |
| 7. | "Tea for Two" | Vincent Youmans, Irving Caesar | 6:10 |
| 8. | "I'm Old Fashioned" | Jerome Kern, Johnny Mercer | 5:01 |
| 9. | "So This Is Love" | Mack David, Al Hoffman, Jerry Livingston | 4:14 |
| 10. | "The Lies of Handsome Men" | Francesca Blumenthal | 5:36 |
| 11. | "Some of These Days" | Shelton Brooks | 4:49 |
| 12. | "Unpack Your Adjectives" | George Newall | 3:46 |

== Personnel ==
- Sara Gazarek - vocals, glockenspiel
- Josh Nelson - piano, keyboards
- Larry Goldings - piano, melodica, organ
- John Pizzarelli - vocals, guitar
- Hamilton Price - bass
- Zach Harmon - drums

== Charts ==
| Chart (2012) | Peak position |
|---|---|
| Billboard Jazz Albums | 18 |
