= Tony Guerrero =

American musician and composer (born 1966)

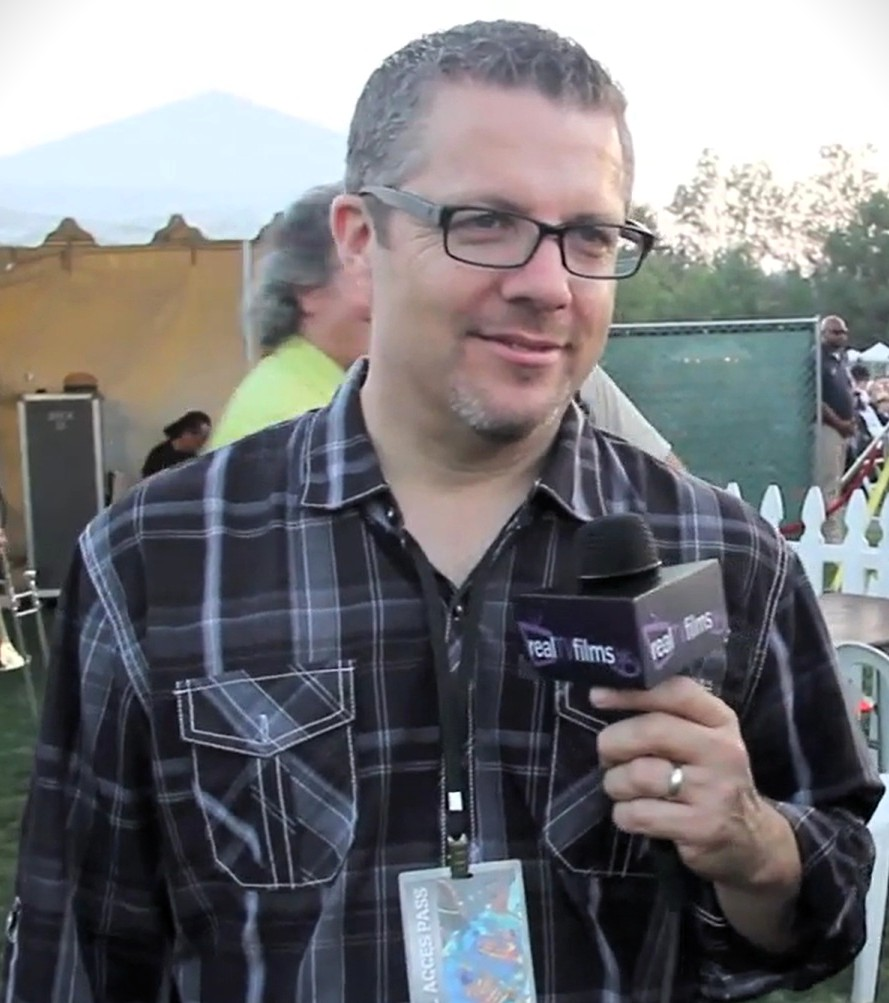
- Guerrero in 2014

Background information
- Born: September 20, 1966 (age 60); Newport Beach, CA, U.S.
- Genres: Jazz, contemporary worship
- Occupations: Musician, Producer, Composer
- Instruments: Trumpet, Piano
- Website: tonyguerrero.com

Tony Guerrero (born September 20, 1966) is an American musician, songwriter, and producer. His career as a jazz trumpeter has spanned nearly forty years beginning with the release of his first CD, Tiara, in 1988. To date, he has released nine solo albums (as well as duo and band releases), several of which have garnered him critical praise, Top 20 jazz radio play, and earned him a worldwide audience. His songs have been recorded by jazz artists around the world including contemporary artists Brian Bromberg and Greg Vail, and he has toured as a headliner and guest artist throughout the United States, Europe, Asia, South America, and the South Pacific. He has played on over 200 albums by other artists and recorded and/or performed with artists as diverse as Freddie Hubbard, Paul McCartney, Joe Sample, Jane Lynch, Tom Scott, Brian Wilson, Billy Idol, Dick Van Dyke, Slash, Phil Keaggy, David Pack, and numerous others. His work as a composer and producer has placed him in a wide variety of styles from jazz, rock, country, Christian, and musical theater.

== Career highlights ==
Guerrero's career began in 1984 shortly after graduating from Saddleback High School when he began working professionally in Orange County, California in jazz clubs and dinner theaters. By 1986 he had formed his band Vision with college friends and caught the eye of White Light Productions, a record label led by Lucille Hunt. After signing Guerrero to a record deal, Hunt left her job in computers to pursue music management full-time, eventually managing Brian Bromberg, Max Bennett, and Rahsaan Patterson.

Guerrero's first album, Tiara, was produced in a sixteen-track studio owned by John Friesen, drummer for the 1970s band Player. Guerrero had little experience in the studio at the time and producer Terry Whetton rarely showed up during the recording sessions. The musicians were a mixture of Guerrero's college-age friends and industry professionals, including Grant Geissman, Merry Clayton, and Max Bennett. Upon its release in 1988, Tiara ended up with a minor hit, "L.A.'d", that started receiving airplay on jazz radio stations around the country, most notably WNUA in Chicago, where the song would remain a staple for many years to come.

White Light Productions was dissolved as a record company. Hunt negotiated a record deal for Guerrero with Nova Records, at the time one of the country's most successful independent contemporary jazz labels. Different Places was released in 1989 and several songs ended up receiving substantial airplay around the country. The songs "Slam Shack", "Pancho", and "Mangione" helped drive the song into the Billboard Top 20 charts. Different Places featured musicians Brian Bromberg, Richard Smith, Norman Brown, Bill Cantos, Brandon Fields and many other contemporary jazz notables. The album also led to Guerrero's first national touring dates as a headliner, performing mostly in clubs and at the Milwaukee Summerfest. The album also featured the song "The Buckethead Shuffle" which was arranged in 1990 for big band and released by Hal Leonard Publications. It became one of their top-selling releases that year and has remained a staple in high school, college and even professional big bands around the world.

Another Day, Another Dream was released in 1991 and was a bigger hit on the radio, landing on several national radio charts. Another Day, Another Dream would lead to more national and international touring dates and established Guerrero as a recognized voice in the early smooth jazz market. The album featured guests artists such as Gerald Albright, Mike Garson, Rob Mullins and more, performing along with Guerrero's band. The cover song, "The Secret Garden", also gave Guerrero a presence on R&B radio playlists.

In 1991 and 1993, Guerrero was a featured headliner at the CanCun Jazz Festival, sharing the stage with legends such as Nancy Wilson, Joe Sample, Wynton Marsalis and more.

After signing to Fahrenheit Records for one album (1995's Now & Then which was a collection of new tracks and previous releases), Guerrero signed to NuGroove Records and released Mysterie in 1996, produced by keyboardist Rob Mullins. The songs "Mysterie" and "For Your Love" were both hits on jazz radio.

More albums would follow in the coming years: Apasionado (2008), a collection of original Latin/Brazilian-themed music featuring Grant Geissman, Bill Cantos, Brian Bromberg, and Eric Marienthal; Blue Room (2010) released on Charleston Square Records, which was Guerrero's first release featuring a more traditional, acoustic jazz setting. Blue Room spent nearly six months on the national jazz charts and received positive reviews.

Over the years, Guerrero has also recorded duo albums (with Bill Cantos and Frank Giebels) and band projects featuring his side groups, The Hi-Fi Quintet and West Coast Sound.

In 2018, Guerrero released a new album of Latin-inspired ballads entitled "Abrazo". The album features the flugelhorn as the primary instrument with Guerrero performing most of the other instruments.

In 2010, Guerrero was chosen to create the big band arrangements for two John Tesh albums (John Tesh Big Band & John Tesh Christmas Big Band). These albums were followed by national tours (for which Guerrero held the solo trumpet chair with a 12-piece big band) and a well-received PBS special.

In 2014, Guerrero hired as music director for Emmy Award-winning actress Jane Lynch's national cabaret tour, See Jane Sing. Guerrero's band, The Tony Guerrero Quintet, accompanied Lynch, actress Kate Flannery, and singer Tim Davis on tour dates around the country.

In 2016, Jane Lynch recorded and released a Christmas album called "A Swingin' Little Christmas" in 2016. The album was released on KitschTone Records, Lynch's own record label, which was co-founded by Guerrero. Guerrero produced and arranged the music, which included five of his original Christmas songs. Two of Guerrero's originals, "Winter's Never Cold (When You're Around)" and "A Swingin' Little Christmas Time", both big band songs, helped the album to reach No. 8 on the Billboard Adult Contemporary charts in 2016. In 2017, the album was the #5 Holiday album in the country, propelled largely by the title track.

Guerrero was featured on actor Dick Van Dyke's 2017 album playing trumpet and singing a duet with the actor on the song "Rocking Chair". Van Dyke also recorded a duet with Jane Lynch on Guerrero's original Christmas song, We're Going Caroling for KitschTone Records.

On November 29, 2017, Guerrero had three songs land on the non-holiday Billboard Adult Contemporary Top 25 charts. Jane Lynch's "A Swingin' Little Christmas Time" was at #18, Dick Van Dyke & Jane Lynch's "We're Going Caroling" was at #24 and Charles Billingsley's "Silver Bells", which Guerrero had arranged, was at #17. By the end of December, 2017, the song "A Swingin' Little Christmas" had become the #5 Christmas song in the country and charted at #10 on Billboard's Adult Contemporary Charts (non-holiday).

In 2017, Kitschtone also released "Underneath the Mistletoe", a Guerrero original featuring gospel artist, Crystal Lewis.

In 2017 Guerrero also performed with Chance the Rapper on the Grammy Awards television broadcast and recorded with Paul McCartney for his new album.

In 2022, Guerrero was featured in the single "Everybody Loves a Lover" by Arlene & The Vantastix. The song was released on Valentine's Day and also featured Arlene's real-life husband, Dick Van Dyke, whom Guerrero had previously worked with.

Also in 2017, Guerrero began working with former Christian artist, Crystal Lewis, producing and co-composing music for 2019's "Rhapsody", 2022's "Together We Can" (which featured popular artists like Tori Kelly & Ty Herndon), and 2024's "A Seasonal Thing", as well as several singles.

In 2021-22 Guerrero produced Arturo Sandoval's album "Rhythm & Soul". The album, which featured three of Guerrero's original compositions, was nominated for Best Latin Jazz Album in the 2023 Grammys.

2024 saw the release of "Duo Tones", an album of jazz duets featuring Guerrero and pianist, Jeremy Siskind on the MetaJAX record label.

Guerrero's work as musician and composer has been featured on numerous films and television shows, including Thelma & Louise, High School Musical 1 & 3, Today Show, Extra, Insider, The Jonas Bros, Keeping Up with the Kardashians, Toddlers & Tiaras, Flipping Out, and PBS specials with Jane Lynch and John Tesh.

== Other work ==
Guerrero was the founder and host of the KSBR Birthday Bash, one of Southern California's leading contemporary jazz festival events. Guerrero founded the event in 1988 and led it through its final show in 2017. Beginning in a small room at the former Dana Point Resort, this unique concert (the headlining artists come without their bands and play each other's music in an unrehearsed jam session format organized by Guerrero) grew to an audience of thousands and attracted contemporary jazz artists like Joe Sample, Larry Carlton, Tom Scott, Chris Botti, Patti Austin and many more over the years. The event was a fundraiser for KSBR 88.5fm, a listener-supported jazz station based out of Saddleback College in Mission Viejo, CA.

From 1999 through 2010 Guerrero served as the Director of Creative Arts and/or Music Director for Saddleback Church (Rick Warren, pastor) where he oversaw hundreds of musicians, singers and artists in everything from weekly services to concerts and productions. In 2005 Saddleback Church presented a large scale musical theater production of The Journey, a Christmas musical co-written by Guerrero. The Journey continues to be performed in churches and theaters around the world. 2007 saw a new original production titled "The Christmas Station". Several of Guerrero's original songs, most notably "(I Will Not Be) Shaken", "This Baby Boy" and "Thirst", are performed in churches around the world.

In 2015 a new arrangement of "This Baby Boy" was premiered at Carnegie Hall in New York City, and the Indianapolis Symphony included the song (along with his "A Swingin' Little Christmas Time") in their 2017 Yuletide program (with Sandi Patty singing).

In 2008, Gospel artist CeCe Winans recorded Guerrero's song "He Is Emmanuel".

From 2002-2008, Guerrero produced the popular yearly SongSeeker albums which introduced new songs from unknown writers to the church market at large.

Guerrero has spoken on various aspects of church music in conferences and at churches around the world. He was a founding planner of the Purpose Driven Worship Conferences and a frequent guest teacher at the National Worship Leader Conferences.

In 2008 Guerrero served as music director for the "Saddleback Civil Forum On the Presidency" with John McCain and Barack Obama.

As an author, Guerrero has written monthly articles for Worship Leader Magazine and "Best Life Magazines" and has published his own book entitled Attracting Quality Musicians. Guerrero has also had several of his original cartoons published in various music publications over the years.

In 2007, Guerrero founded and continues to serve as president of FACT Alliance, a charitable organization which seeks to provide aftercare for victims of Human Trafficking and Sex Slavery both in the United States and Internationally through their Let's Respond campaign.

As an educator, Guerrero currently teaches Music Production at Cal Baptist University in Riverside, CA. He previously taught worship music students at Hope University in Fullerton, CA. He is also the Worship Director at Coast Hills Church in Aliso Viejo, CA.

Guerrero maintains his personal recording studio, Third Bedroom Studios, in his home where much of his personal recording work is done. He also maintains a large collection of Louis Armstrong memorabilia at his home in Southern California which he shares his two children, Ella and Nico.

== Selected discography ==
=== As leader ===
- Tiara (White Light Productions, 1988)
- Different Places (Nova, 1989)
- Another Day, Another Dream (Nova, 1991)
- Now & Then (Fahrenheit, 1995)
- Mysterie (NuGroove, 1996)
- Ballads (Windsong, 2001)
- Christmas Songs (with Bill Cantos) (Terminally Hip Productions, 2002
- "If I Could Have It All" (single) (Native Language, 2003)
- The Hi–Fi Quintet (Swingfest, 2003)
- Apasionado (Native Language, 2008)
- This Is the Hi–Fi Quintet (Swingfest, 2008)
- The Journey (Original Cast Recording) (Shadow Works Productions, 2009
- Blue Room (Charleston Square, 2010)
- Reunion (with Frank Giebels) (Swingfest, 2012)
- The Thing Is (Swingfest, 2015)
- Tony Guerrero & West Coast Sound (Swingfest, 2016)
- Abrazo (Terminally Hip Music, 2018)

=== As sideman (selected discography) ===
- Jane Lynch, A Swingin' Little Christmas
- Dick Van Dyke, Step (Back) in Time
- Arturo Sandoval, Rhythm & Soul
- High School Musical
- High School Musical 3
- Brian Bromberg, Compared to That
- Brian Wilson, Sweet Insanity
- Paul McCartney, Egypt Station
- Toni Childs, House of Hope
- Dan Siegel, Inside Out
- John Tesh, Big Band Christmas
- John Tesh, Big Band
- Thelma & Louise, Original Motion Picture Soundtrack
