= Thirsty Ghost =

Studio album by Sara Gazarek
- Released: 2019
- Producer: Sara Gazarek

Thirsty Ghost is a studio album by Sara Gazarek.

The album earned a Grammy nomination for Best Jazz Vocal Album.

== Track listing ==
No.	Title	Writer(s)	Length
1.	"Lonely Hours"	Hy Glaser	5:57
2.	"Never Will I Marry"	Frank Loesser	3:47
3.	"I'm Not the Only One"	Sam Smith, James Napier	4:46
4.	"Easy Love"	Larry Goldings, Sara Gazarek	4:17
5.	"I Get Along Without You Very Well"	Hoagy Carmichael	5:42
6.	"I Believe (When I Fall in Love It Will Be Forever)"	Stevie Wonder	5:43
7.	"Jolene"	Dolly Parton	4:33
8.	"Gaslight District"	Larry Goldings, Sara Gazarek	5:27
9.	"Riverman/The River"	Nick Drake, Sara Teasdale	6:59
10.	"Intro: Chrysalis"	Alex Boneham	0:33
11.	"Cocoon"	Bjork	5:53
12.	"Distant Storm"	Brad Mehldau, Sara Gazarek	6:11

== Personnel ==
- Sara Gazarek - Vocals
- Stu Mindeman - Piano/Organ/Rhodes
- Alex Boneham - Bass
- Christian Euman - Drums
- Josh Johnson - Alto Saxophone
- Ido Meshulam - Trombone
- Brian Walsh - Bass Clarinet
- Keita Ogawa - Percussion
- Aaron Serfaty - Percussion
- Larry Goldings - Organ
- Kurt Elling - Special Guest Vocalist
- Erin Bentlage - Background Vocals
- Michael Mayo - Background Vocals
