= Anticipation (Josh Nelson album) =

Studio album by Josh Nelson
- Released: 2004
- Genre: Jazz
- Length: 58:10
- Label: Steel Bird Music
- Producer: Josh Nelson

Josh Nelson chronology
First Stories (1998)	Anticipation (2004)	Let It Go (2007)

Anticipation is the second studio album by pianist Josh Nelson. It was released in 2004.

== Track listing ==
All music is composed by Josh Nelson.

No.	Title	Length
1.	"Requited"	7:25
2.	"Prospect Bay"	6:09
3.	"Anticipation"	7:16
4.	"Man with Dreams"	7:20
5.	"Brazen Hussy"	6:27
6.	"Early Departures"	6:36
7.	"Emergence"	5:51
8.	"Most Beautiful"	5:17
9.	"Brave World"	5:49

== Personnel ==
- Josh Nelson - Piano, Fender Rhodes (on track 4)
- Benjamin Campbell - Bass
- Matt Slocum - Drums
- Steve Cotter - Guitar (on tracks 2 & 4)
- Sara Gazarek - Vocals (on track 4)
- Ludvig Girdland - Violin (on track 4)
- Dayna Stephens - Tenor Saxophone (on tracks 6 & 8)
