= Cody Fry =

American guitarist and songwriter (born 1990)

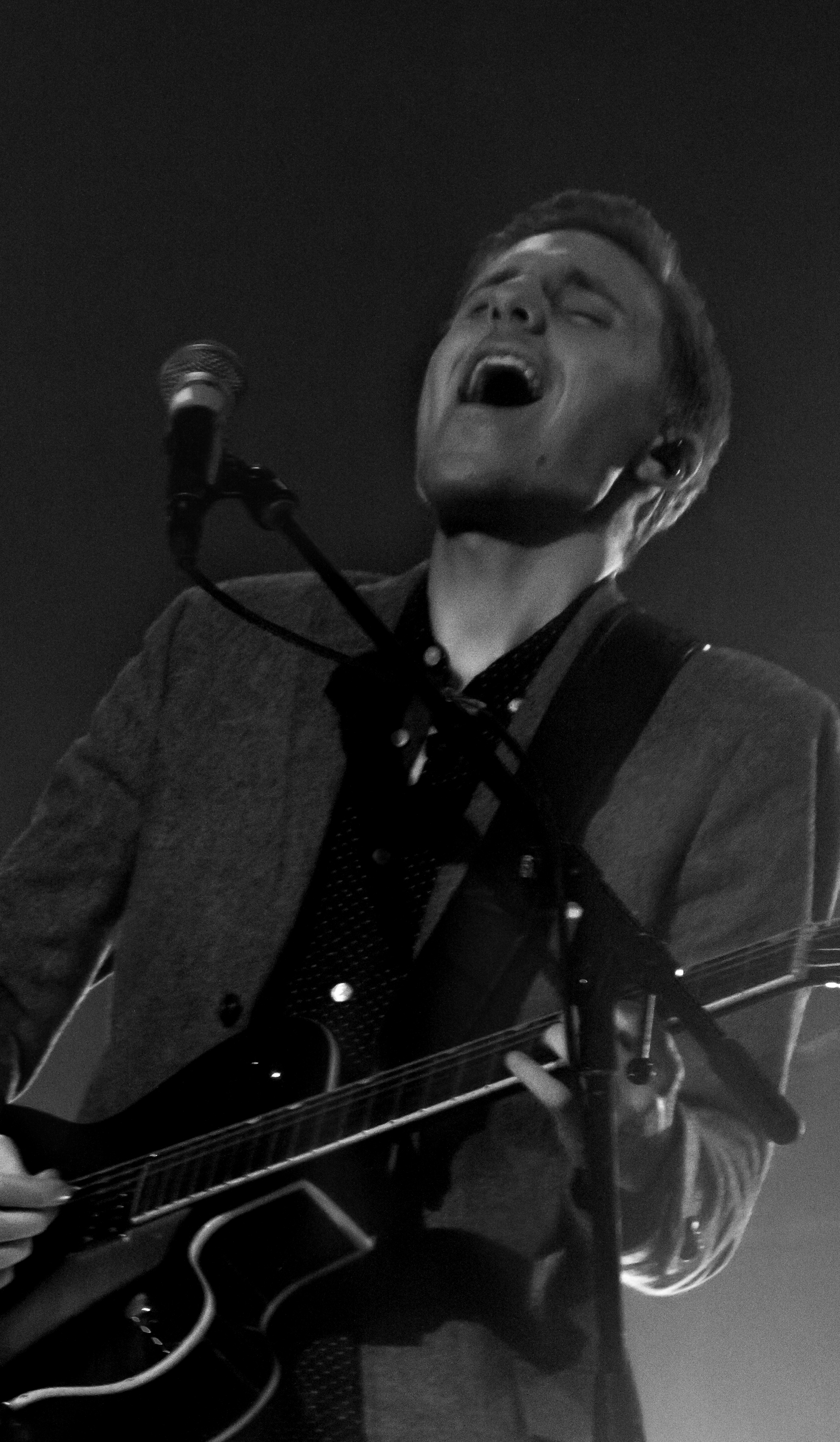
- Fry in 2016

Background information
- Born: July 10, 1990 (age 36); Northfield, Illinois
- Genres: Pop; rock; soul; orchestral pop
- Occupations: Singer-songwriter; musician; composer; producer
- Instruments: Vocals; guitar; piano; keyboards
- Years active: 2006–present
- Label: Decca
- Website: codyfry.com

Cody Fry (born July 10, 1990) is an American singer-songwriter, multi-instrumentalist, composer and producer based in Nashville, Tennessee. He gained national attention on the 14th season of American Idol making it to the top 48. He has released several solo albums since 2006. His work spans many genres including pop, orchestral pop, and soul. He is known for his orchestral pop compositions, including orchestral versions of covers. In 2021, he was nominated for a Grammy Award at the 64th edition in the category of Best Arrangement, Instrumental and Vocals for his cover of The Beatles' "Eleanor Rigby", and again in 2025 for his arrangement of "The Sound of Silence" by Simon & Garfunkel.

He has collaborated and worked with a number of artists, including Cory Wong and Ben Rector. He has released eight albums and one compilation, which include recent releases such as Pictures of Mountains (2021), Symphony Sessions (2022), and The End (2023).

== Biography ==
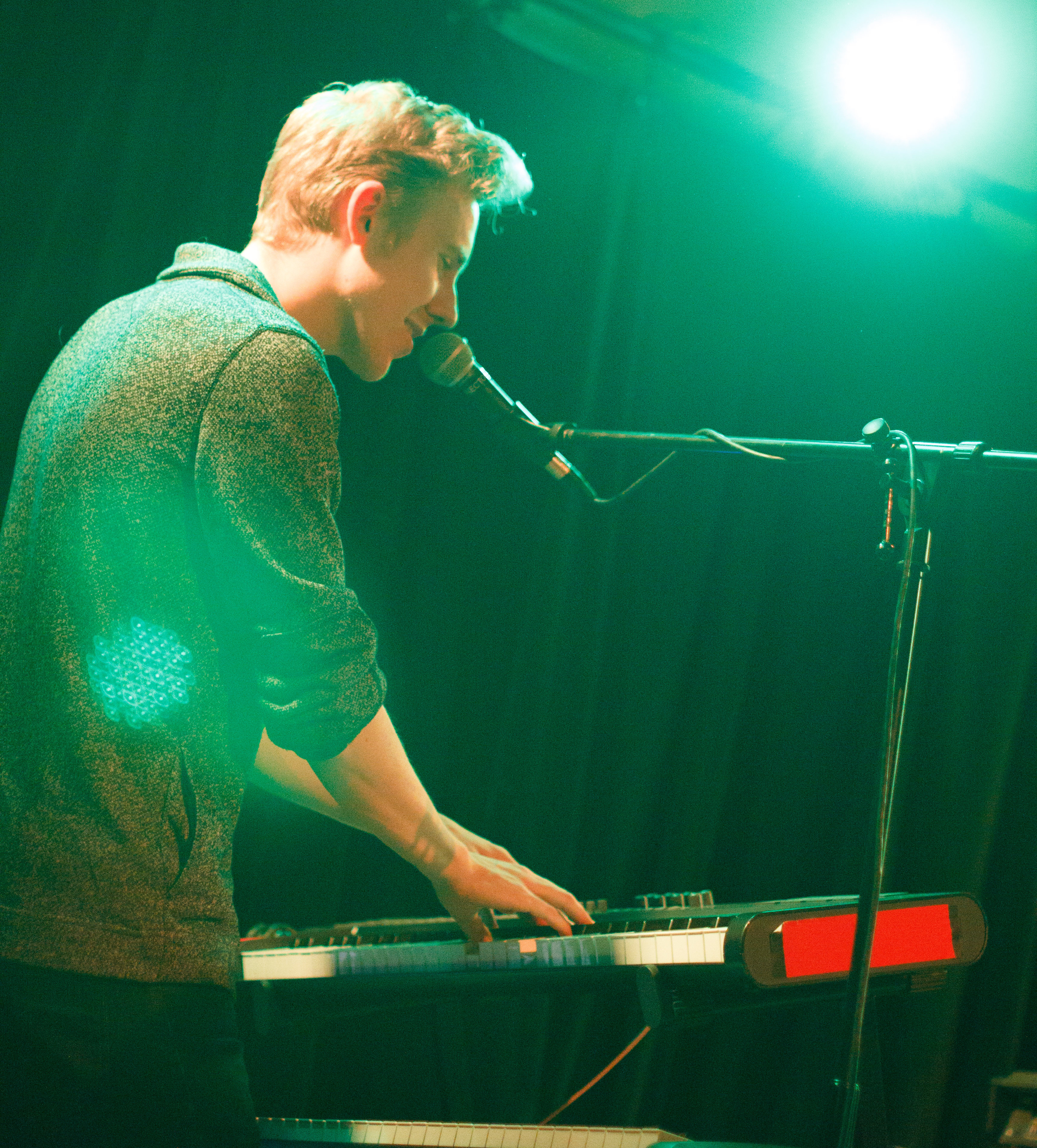
Fry in 2012

Cody Fry, the son of orchestral composer Gary Fry, is a Nashville-based singer, songwriter, and musician. He moved to Nashville to study voice at Belmont University after graduating from New Trier High School in 2008, where he actively participated in various ensembles such as the symphony orchestra, choir opera, swing choir, and chorus.

In 2015, Fry gained national recognition as one of the 48 final contestants on the 14th season of American Idol.

In 2021, his song "I Hear a Symphony" became a hit on TikTok, achieving massive success and climbing the Spotify Global Viral Charts, charting in 38 countries. Furthermore, Fry garnered more attention as an arranger in 2021 when his cover of The Beatles' "Eleanor Rigby" received a Grammy nomination in the Grammy Award for Best Arrangement, Instrumental and Vocals category. He received his second Grammy nomination in the same category in 2025 for his cover of Paul Simon's "The Sound of Silence".

In 2020, Fry performed with the Metropole Orkest for the live show Live in Amsterdam, featuring Cory Wong and the Metropole Orkest. In 2023, Fry performed his songs "Underground" and "Photograph" at John F. Kennedy Center for the Performing Arts with Ben Rector and the National Symphony Orchestra conducted by Steven Reineke. Fry and Rector continued their partnership and toured their orchestra show around the country appearing with orchestras including the Nashville Symphony, Pacific Symphony, and Dallas Symphony, (conducted by Enrico Lopez-Yañez), as well as the Minnesota Orchestra (conducted by Sarah Hicks) and the Cincinnati Pops among others.

== Discography ==
Cody Fry discography
- Studio albums: 8
- Compilation albums: 1
- Singles: 12
- Music videos: 7
- As featured artist: 2
- Other appearances: 11

=== Studio albums ===
| Title | Album details |
|---|---|
| Coincidence? | Released: 2006; Label: Self-released; Format: CD |
| audio:cinema | Released: February 5, 2012; Label: Self-released; Format: CD, digital download |
| Keswick | Released: January 7, 2014; Label: Self-released; Format: CD, digital download |
| Flying | Released: October 6, 2017; Label: Self-released; Format: CD, LP, digital download, streaming |
| Christmas Music: The Complete Collection | Released: November 27, 2019; Label: Self-released; Format: CD, digital download, streaming |
| Pictures of Mountains | Released: January 29, 2021; Label: Self-released; Format: CD, LP, digital download, streaming |
| Symphony Sessions | Released: January 21, 2022; Label: Decca; Format: CD, LP, digital download, streaming |
| The End | Release date: September 15, 2023; Label: Decca; Format: LP, digital download, streaming |

==== Flying ====
Flying

Studio album by Cody Fry
- Released: October 6, 2017
- Length: 41:04
- Label: Atlas
- Producers: Cody Fry, Chad Copelin, Brandon Hood

Cody Fry chronology
| Keswick (2014) | Flying (2017) | Christmas Music: The Complete Collection (2019) |

Flying is the fourth studio album released by Fry. The album was recorded at Blackwatch Studio in Norman, Oklahoma and the orchestral score was mainly recorded at Ocean Way Studios in Nashville, Tennessee. Fry scored and arranged all 14 songs on this album.

The song "I Hear a Symphony" went viral on TikTok in 2021. It was a surprise hit and Fry has played the song in symphony orchestras across the United States, including at the St. Louis Symphony Orchestra.

Tracks:

All tracks are written by Fry, except where noted

| No. | Title | Writer(s) | Length |
|---|---|---|---|
| 1. | "Prelude" | | 0:47 |
| 2. | "Better" | | 3:27 |
| 3. | "Go" | Cody Fry; Brandon Hood | 3:14 |
| 4. | "Nobody But You" | Fry; Mark Trussell | 3:13 |
| 5. | "Love Somebody" | | 3:03 |
| 6. | "Interlude: Wind at the Edge of a Cliff" | | 0:41 |
| 7. | "Flying" | | 3:58 |
| 8. | "Hold On" | | 3:15 |
| 9. | "Interlude: From Across the Room" | | 0:58 |
| 10. | "Falling in Love" | | 3:55 |
| 11. | "Want Me Back" | | 4:45 |
| 12. | "Before I Met You" | | 3:44 |
| 13. | "A Little More" | | 2:50 |
| 14. | "I Hear a Symphony" | | 3:05 |
| Total length: | | | 41:04 |

=== Compilations ===
| Title | Album details |
|---|---|
| Symphonic | Released: March 24, 2023; Label: Decca; Format: CD, LP, digital download, streaming |

=== Singles ===
==== As lead artist ====
| Title | Year | Album |
|---|---|---|
| "Find My Way Back - Live" / "Used to Be - Live" / "Underground - Live" | 2014 | Live Captured Recordings (Note: Live Captured Recordings is the name of a three-song single.) |
| From the Cold (Live) | 2016 | Non-album single |
| "The Christmas Song" / "I'll Be Home for Christmas" / "From the Cold" | 2017 | Christmas Music, Vol. 1 (Note: Christmas Music, Vol. 1 is the name of a three-song single.) / Christmas Music: The Complete Collection |
| "Vegas" | 2018 | Non-album single |
| "Jingle Bells" / "When Christmas Comes Around" / "Alone on Christmas With You" | 2018 | Christmas Music, Vol. 2 (Note: Christmas Music, Vol. 2 is the name of a three-song single.) / Christmas Music: The Complete Collection |
| "Want Me Back" / "Better" (with Cory Wong and Dynamo) | 2019 | 08.26.18 (Note: 08.26.18 is the name of a two-song single.) |
| "That Thing You Do" | 2019 | Non-album single |
| "Eleanor Rigby" / "Eleanor Rigby - Slowed + Reverbed" / "Eleanor Rigby - Instrumental" | 2022 | Eleanor Rigby (Note: Eleanor Rigby is the name of a three-song single.) / Symphony Sessions |
| "I Hear a Symphony" / "I Hear a Symphony - Slowed + Reverbed" / "I Hear a Symphony - Instrumental" | 2023 | I Hear a Symphony / Symphony Sessions / Symphonic (Note: I Hear a Symphony is the name of a three-song single.) |
| "Photograph" / "Photograph / Claire de Lune" / "Photograph - Instrumental" / "Photograph Epilogue" | 2023 | "Photography" (Note: Photograph is the name of a four-song single.) / Symphonic |
| "Fix You" | 2023 | The End |
| "Waltz for Sweatpants" | 2023 | The End |
| "Things You Said" (featuring Abby Cates) | 2023 | The End |

==== As featured artist ====
| Title | Year | Album |
|---|---|---|
| "Golden" (Cory Wong featuring Cody Fry) | 2020 | Elevated Music for an Elevated Mood |
| "Coming Back Around" (Cory Wong featuring Cody Fry) | 2021 | Cory Wong & The Wongnotes |

=== Music videos ===
| Title | Year | Album |
|---|---|---|
| "Go" | 2016 | Flying |
| "That Thing You Do" | 2019 | —N/a |
| "Photograph" | 2020 | Pictures of Mountains |
| "Thinking About You" | 2020 | Pictures of Mountains |
| "Pictures of Mountains" | 2020 | Pictures of Mountains |
| "I Hear a Symphony" | 2023 | Symphonic |
| "Waltz for Sweatpants | 2023 | The End |

=== Production and songwriting ===
These are writing and production credits for music outside of Fry's own solo work.

| Title | Year | Artist | Album | Notes | Ref. |
|---|---|---|---|---|---|
| —N/a | 2015 | Ben Rector | Brand New | String arrangement and conductor | |
| —N/a | 2018 | Ben Rector | Magic | String arrangement, programming, conductor | |
| "Golden" | 2020 | Cory Wong | Elevator Music for an Elevated Mood | Co-writer | |
| "Power Station" | 2022 | Cory Wong | Power Station | Co-writer | |

=== Other appearances ===
| Title | Year | Credited artist(s) | Album | Ref. |
|---|---|---|---|---|
| —N/a | 2018 | Ben Rector | Magic | |
| "'91 Maxima" | 2018 | Cory Wong | The Optimist | |
| Jumbotron Hype Song | 2018 | Cory Wong (featuring Antwaun Stanley and Sonny T.) | The Optimist | |
| "The Optimist" | 2018 | Cory Wong | The Optimist | |
| "Takeoff" | 2020 | Cory Wong (featuring Rachel Mazer) | Elevator Music for an Elevated Mood | |
| "Winslow" | 2020 | Cory Wong | Elevator Music for an Elevated Mood | |
| "BBC News" | 2020 | Cory Wong | Elevator Music for an Elevated Mood | |
| "Better" - Live | 2020 | Cory Wong and Metropole Orkest (featuring Cody Fry) | Live in Amsterdam | |
| "Want Me Back" - Live | 2020 | Cory Wong and Metropole Orkest (featuring Cody Fry) | Live in Amsterdam | |
| "Underground" - Live | | Cory Wong and Metropole Orkest (featuring Cody Fry) | Live in Amsterdam | |
| "The Way It Is" - Live | | Cory Wong and Metropole Orkest (featuring Cody Fry) | Live in Amsterdam | |

== Awards and nominations ==
Cody Fry awards and nominations
Awards and nominations
| Award | Wins | Nominations |
Totals
| Grammy Awards | 0 | 2 |
| Wins | 0 |
| Nominations | 3 |

| Year | Nominated work | Award | Category | Result |
|---|---|---|---|---|
| 2022 | Eleanor Rigby | Grammy Award | Best Arrangement, Instruments and Vocals | Nominated |
| 2025 | The Sound Of Silence | Grammy Award | Best Arrangement, Instruments and Vocals | Nominated |
| 2026 | What a Wonderful World | Grammy Award | Best Arrangement, Instruments and Vocals | Nominated |
