= Säje =

American vocal quartet

Säje (/seɪʒ/; stylized in lowercase as säje) is an American vocal quartet. The group won a 2024 Grammy Award for its debut album.

== History ==
The group, composed of Erin Bentlage, Sara Gazarek, Johnaye Kendrick and Amanda Taylor, originated with a 2018 Seattle concert of Taylor's vocal ensemble Groove for Thought in which Gazarek was a featured artist. After the concert, the two discussed the idea of forming their own project and decided to invite the Los Angeles-based Bentlage and Kendrick. All four members gathered initially during a 2019 session in Palm Springs intended to explore the possibility of collaboration. The weekend ended with the composition of the single "Desert Song," which Bentlage described as inspired by "oh my God this is what it feels like to be creating with feminine energy in a beautifully accepted form.” With Collier, the group won the 2024 Grammy Award for Best Arrangement, Instrumental and Vocals for "In The Wee Small Hours of The Morning" from their debut album.

They began performing together in 2020, debuting at the Jazz Education Network conference. In 2023, säje embarked on its first extensive tour to promote its debut album.

The ensemble has been described as a supergroup; its members are each established as solo artists, with appearances alongside The Manhattan Transfer, Chanticleer and Jacob Collier.

"Säje" is an acronym of the four members' first names.

== Sound ==
Säje has been noted for touching a wide range of styles, including contemporary jazz, pop, folk, blues and soul music. Its original songs are known to comment on social issues. Each member's vocal take is often doubled, creating a more expansive sonority. WBGO's Leo Sidran writes that säje's style is "technically challenging to execute—suspended chords and interweaving lines—and very satisfying to experience."

== Discography ==
In 2021, the group released a single, "Dusk Baby," with Gerald Clayton.

The group's debut album, säje, was released in 2023, featuring collaborations with Jacob Collier, Ambrose Akinmusire, Terri Lyne Carrington and Michael Mayo, among others. Its recording was hampered by COVID-19 pandemic restrictions and the difficulties of remote collaboration; the group eventually rented an Airbnb in Palm Springs, California and outfitted it as a recording studio. The album landed at #2 on the Billboard contemporary jazz chart.

== Awards and nominations ==
Year	Award	Category	Work	Result	Ref.
2021	Grammy Award	Best Arrangement, Instrumental and Vocals	Desert Song	Nominated	
2024	Grammy Award	Best Arrangement, Instrumental and Vocals	In The Wee Small Hours Of The Morning (featuring Jacob Collier)	Won	
2025	Grammy Award	Best Arrangement, Instrumental and Vocals	Alma (featuring Regina Carter)	Won	
2025	Grammy Award	Best Arrangement, Instrumental or A Cappella	Silent Night	Nominated	
2025	Grammy Award	Best Arrangement, Instrumental or A Cappella	Rose Without The Thorns (Scott Hoying featuring säje and Tonality)	Nominated	
2026	Grammy Award	Best Arrangement, Instrumental and Vocals	Big Fish (Nate Smith featuring säje)	Won	
