= The End (Cody Fry album) =

Studio album by Cody Fry
- Released: September 15, 2023
- Recorded: 2020
- Genres: Symphonic pop, pop rock
- Length: 32:12
- Label: Decca
- Producer: Cody Fry

Cody Fry chronology
Symphony Sessions (2022)	The End (2023)

The End is the eighth studio album by American singer-songwriter Cody Fry, released on September 15, 2023, through Decca Records US. The album was arranged and composed by Fry, and recorded with the Royal Philharmonic Orchestra. Discussing themes of romance of anxiety, influences on the album included fatherhood and panic attacks amidst during the COVID-19 pandemic. The title "the end" reflects the feeling of "the end of the world" during a panic attack, and the conclusion of Fry's time as an independent artist.

== Production and release ==
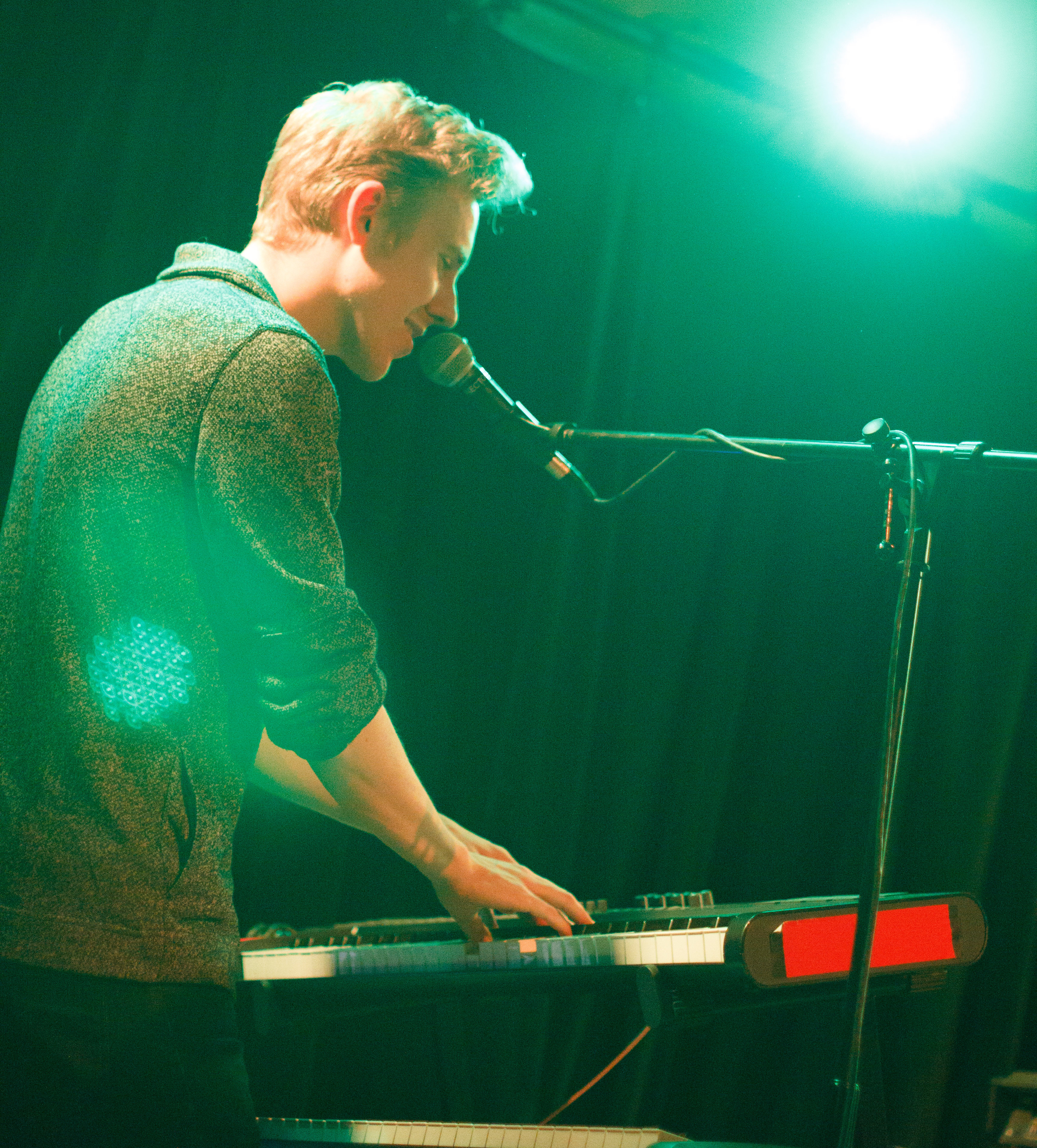
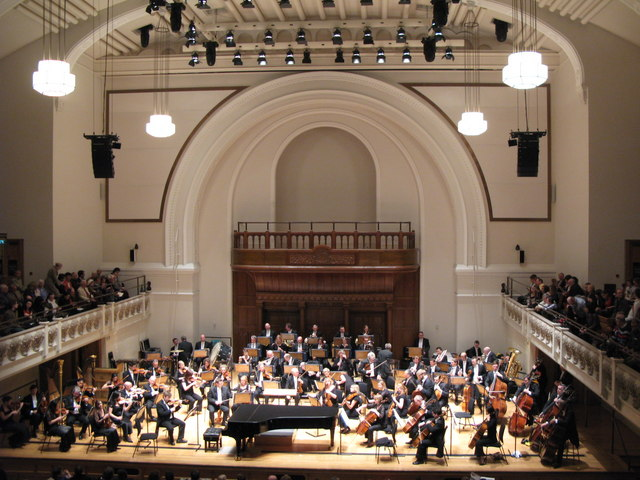
Cody Fry in 2012 and the Royal Philharmonic Orchestra in 2011

Fry composed and arranged the entire album. Composing the music in the album either began with drafting the arcs of the song with pencil and paper, or creating a demo with computer programs. Regarding the music itself, he mainly composed what he would find enjoyable to do at the time of writing it. The compositions were inspired by movie musicals, notably The Greatest Showman. He then recorded the music with the Royal Philharmonic Orchestra, at Angel Studios in London. The song "Waltz for Sweatpants" released June 23, 2023, followed by "What If" on August 11, and the full album on September 15, 2023. "What If", "Waltz for Sweatpants", and "Fine" were accompanied with music videos.

=== Themes ===
The End discusses themes of romance and anxiety. Fry had dealt with panic attacks amidst the COVID-19 pandemic beginning in March 2020 and expressed his feelings of anxiety in the album; he found writing the music to be therapeutic. The album is narratively organized to start with excitement and romance, followed by feelings of anxiety and loneliness, and concluding with peace and self-healing. To express self-healing he ended the album with "Fix You" by Coldplay, one of Fry's favorite songs. The second song on the album, "What If", is about a lesson he learned from therapy, where although there is a worse outcome to every situation, there is also a best outcome. "Waltz for Sweatpants" depicts what Fry enjoys most about love, which is "staying at home all day in my sweatpants" and not caring what others think about his relationship. He considered "Fine" to be the most depressing song he has ever written, and created it with the intention of showing others they are not alone in the way they feel.

He expressed the concept of "the end" in the album to have a double-meaning: the first being the feeling of "the end of the world" during a panic attack, and the second being the conclusion of his career as an independent artist. The album was released under Decca Records US, concluding his time as an independent artist and his first release with a label. Fry had recently had a child, and themes of beginning a new chapter of fatherhood would also inspire the themes on the album.

== Track listing ==
The End track listing
No.	Title	Length
1.	"The End"	3:56
2.	"What If"	4:04
3.	"Waltz for Sweatpants"	3:15
4.	"Traveling Alone"	3:19
5.	"Somebody to You" (feat. Cory Wong and Vincent García)	4:11
6.	"Things You Said" (feat. Abby Cates)	3:54
7.	"Fine"	1:49
8.	"You're Gonna Be Okay" (feat. Voces8)	3:11
9.	"Fix You"	4:28
Total length:		32:12

== See also ==
- Impact of the COVID-19 pandemic on the music industry
