= Triosence =

- Origin: Germany
- Genres: Jazz
- Years active: 1999–present
- Labels: Mons, Sony
- Members: Bernhard Schüler; Matthias Nowak; Stephan Emig
- Website: triosence.com

Triosence is a German jazz group founded in 1999. The members are Bernhard Schüler (piano), Matthias Nowak (bass), and Stephan Emig (drums).

== History ==
The band was founded in 1999. Their name comes from "trio" and "essence" to emphasize their collaborative approach.

Beginning in 2008, Triosence worked with American singer Sara Gazarek on the album Where Time Stands Still. They communicated through telephone and on the computer via email and Skype. Schuler traveled to the U.S. in 2009, followed later by the rest of the trio, and they performed together for the first time. Gazarek recorded the album with Triosence in Bonn, Germany, but it did not appear in the U.S. until 2012. Schüler called the album "European jazz with an American accent".

Triosence won the national competition Jugend jazzt, the Ostsee (Baltic Sea) Jazz Festival,} and the Kulturforderpreis of Kassel.

== Discography ==
- First Enchantment (Mons, 2002)
- Away for Awhile (Mons, 2005)
- When You Come Home (Sony BMG, 2008)
- Where Time Stands Still with Sara Gazarek (Charleston Square, 2012)
- One Summer Night (Mons, 2013)
- Turning Points (Sony, 2013)
- Hidden Beauty (Okeh, 2017)
- Scorpio Rising (Sony, 2019)
- Giulia (Sony, 2022)
