= Discoveries (Josh Nelson album) =

Studio album by Josh Nelson
- Released: September 6, 2011
- Genre: Jazz
- Length: 57:06
- Label: Steel Bird Music
- Producer: Josh Nelson, Dan Schnelle, Dave Robaire

Josh Nelson chronology
| I Hear a Rhapsody (2009) | Discoveries (2011) |

Discoveries is the fifth studio album by the jazz pianist Josh Nelson. The album was released by Steel Bird Music on September 6, 2011.

JazzTimes described it as "an album that lives up to its name, revealing more complexity and pleasure each time."

== Track listing ==
All music is composed by Josh Nelson, except where noted.

| No. | Title | Length |
|---|---|---|
| 1. | "Atma-Krandana" | 7:41 |
| 2. | "Sinking Ship" | 7:16 |
| 3. | "Dirigibles" | 6:47 |
| 4. | "Tesla Coil" | 3:16 |
| 5. | "Discoveries" | 7:50 |
| 6. | "Memorial" | 2:29 |
| 7. | "Jogging Day" | 6:13 |
| 8. | "Wells, Verne, and the Magic Lantern" | 3:57 |
| 9. | "Weena (Love Theme from "The Time Machine")" (Russell Garcia) | 1:34 |
| 10. | "Griffith Park Promenade" | 4:45 |
| 11. | "Ode to a Zoetrope" | 5:25 |

== Personnel ==
- Josh Nelson – piano, keyboard
- Dontae Winslow – trumpet, flugelhorn
- Alan Ferber – trombone
- Brian Walsh – bass clarinet
- Larry Koonse – guitar
- Dave Robaire – double bass, bass guitar
- Dan Schnelle – drums, percussion
- Vanessa Robaire – vocals
