= Erin Bentlage =

Grammy Winning Musician

Erin Bentlage is a three-time Grammy award-winning jazz composer & singer-songwriter from Vermont. She is part of the American vocal quartet säje.

== Career ==
Bentlage was raised in a small town near Burlington, Vermont where she took ballet and piano classes. She later developed a passion for jazz and improvisation. In 2019, she founded a vocal super-group named säje with Sara Gazarek, Amanda Taylor, and Johnaye Kendrick.

In 2020, she was selected for the Los Angeles Jazz Society's 'New Note' project, wherein she was commissioned to write a 20-minute original piece.

She has contributed background vocals to tracks by artists such as Moonchild, Pomplamoose and Michael Mayo. She can also be heard on the albums Djesse Vol. 3 by Jacob Collier, Allemong by Christian Euman and Golden Light by Amber Navran.

At the 63rd Annual Grammy Awards, she was nominated for her first Grammy Award for Best Arrangement, Instruments and Vocals with säje for Desert Song. She has since been nominated for five more Grammy Awards, winning three.

She is currently a faculty member of the Los Angeles College of Music and Silverlake Conservatory of Music in voice, jazz improvisation, and composition.

== Awards and nominations ==
| Year | Award | Category | Work | Result | Ref. |
|---|---|---|---|---|---|
| 2021 | Grammy Award | Best Arrangement, Instrumental and Vocals | Desert Song | Nominated | |
| 2024 | Grammy Award | Best Arrangement, Instrumental and Vocals | In The Wee Small Hours Of The Morning | Won | |
| 2025 | Grammy Award | Best Arrangement, Instrumental and Vocals | Alma | Won | |
| 2025 | Grammy Award | Best Arrangement, Instrumental or A Cappella | Silent Night | Nominated | |
| 2025 | Grammy Award | Best Arrangement, Instrumental or A Cappella | Rose Without The Thorns | Nominated | |
| 2026 | Grammy Award | Best Arrangement, Instrumental and Vocals | Big Fish | Won | |
