= Grammy Award for Best Arrangement, Instrumental and Vocals =

Music award

- "Big Fish" by Nate Smith (pictured) featuring säje is the most recent recipient
- Awarded for: Quality arrangements of instrumentals with vocals
- Country: United States
- Presented by: National Academy of Recording Arts and Sciences
- First award: 1963
- Currently held by: Erin Bentlage, Sara Gazarek, Johnaye Kendrick, Nate Smith & Amanda Taylor - "Big Fish" (2026)
- Website: grammy.com

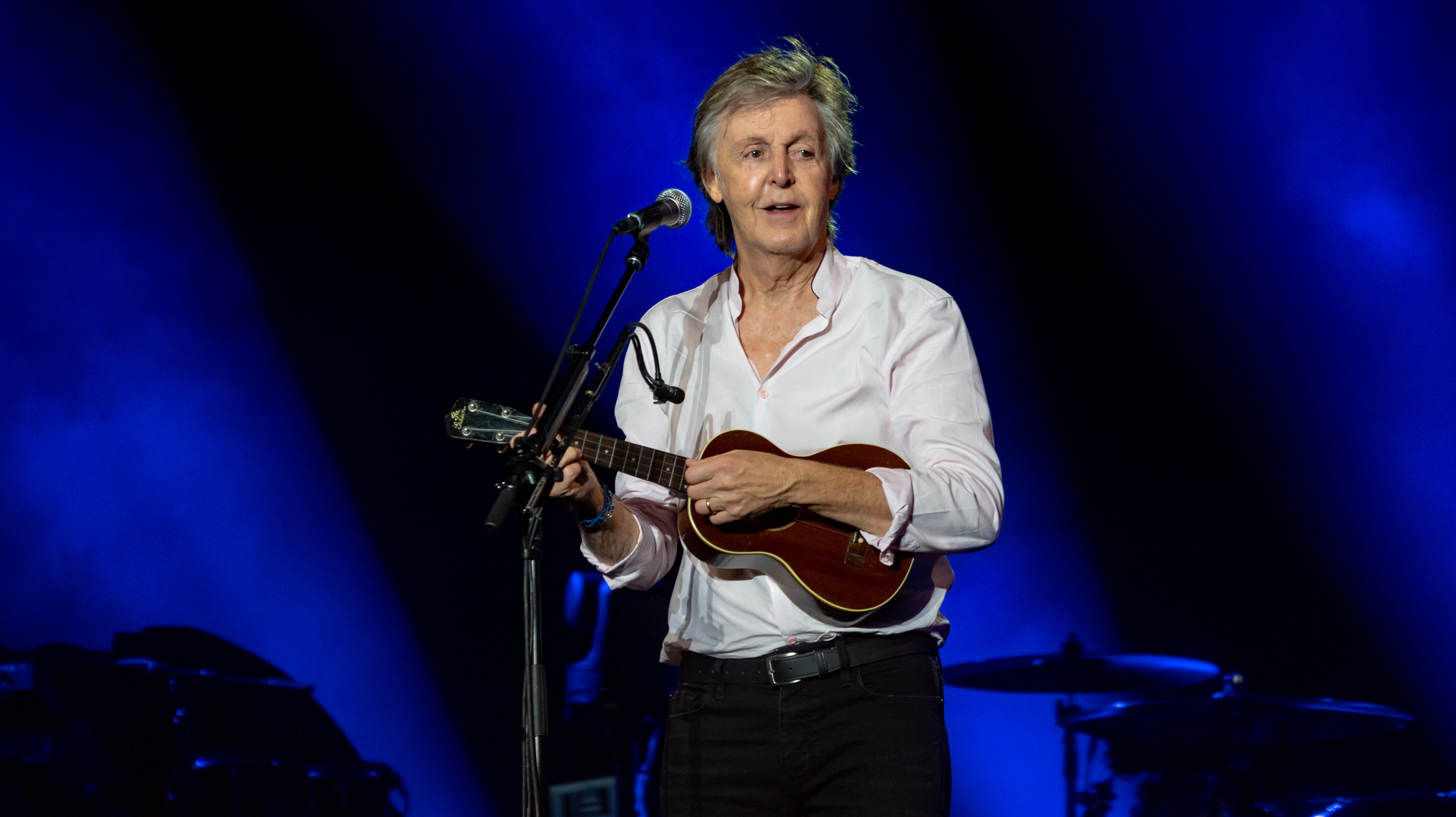
Paul McCartney, former award recipient

The Grammy Award for Best Arrangement, Instruments and Vocals (including its previous names) has been awarded since 1963. The award is presented to the arranger of the music, not to the performer, unless the performer is also the arranger.

There have been several minor changes to the name of the award:

- From 1963 to 1964 the award was known as Best Background Arrangement
- In 1965 it was awarded as Best Accompaniment Arrangement for Vocalist(s) or Instrumentalist(s)
- From 1966 to 1967 it was awarded as Best Arrangement Accompanying a Vocalist or Instrumentalist
- In 1968 it was awarded as Best Instrumental Arrangement Accompanying Vocalist(s)/Best Background Arrangement
- From 1969 to 1978 and in 1981 it was awarded as Best Arrangement Accompanying Vocalist(s)
- From 1979 to 1980 it was awarded as Best Arrangement Accompanying Vocal(s)
- From 1982 to 1994 and from 1998 to 1999 it was awarded as Best Instrumental Arrangement Accompanying Vocal(s)
- From 1995 to 1997 it was awarded as Best Instrumental Arrangement with Accompanying Vocals
- From 2000 to 2014 it was awarded as Best Instrumental Arrangement Accompanying Vocalist(s)
- Since 2015, it has been awarded as Best Arrangement, Instruments And Vocals, which also includes vocal arrangements.

Years reflect the year in which the Grammy Awards were presented, for works released in the previous year.

== Recipients ==
Year^{[I]}	Arranger(s)	Work	Performing (non-winning) artist(s)	Nominees Non-nominated performers are in parentheses	Ref.
1963	Marty Manning	"I Left My Heart in San Francisco"	Tony Bennett	Marty Paich – "What Kind of Fool Am I?" (Sammy Davis Jr.); Bill Finegan – "My Ship" (Carol Sloane); Antonio Carlos Jobim – "Joao Gilberto" (Joao Gilberto); Marty Paich – "I Can't Stop Loving You" (Ray Charles); Marion Evans – "Go Away Little Girl" (Steve Lawrence); Marty Paich – "Born to Lose" (Ray Charles)	
1964	Henry Mancini	"Days of Wine and Roses"	Henry Mancini	Pete King – "Wives and Lovers" (Jack Jones); Gerald Wilson – "Tell Me the Truth" (Nancy Wilson); Nelson Riddle – "Call Me Irresponsible" (Frank Sinatra); Benny Carter – "Busted" (Ray Charles); Marion Evans – "Blame It on the Bossa Nova" (Eydie Gorme)	
1965	Peter Matz	"People"	Barbra Streisand	George Siravo – "How Can I Turn To" (Tony Bennett); Pete King – "Where Love Has Gone" (Jack Jones); Sid Bass – "We'll Sing in the Sunshine" (Gale Garnett); Don Ralke – "Ringo" (Lorne Greene); Oliver Nelson – "How Glad I Am" (Nancy Wilson)	
1966	Gordon Jenkins	"It Was a Very Good Year"	Frank Sinatra	George Martin – "Yesterday" (The Beatles); Burt Bacharach – "What The World Needs Now Is Love" (Jackie DeShannon); Les Reed – "It's Not Unusual" (Tom Jones); Don Costa – "He Touched Me" (Barbra Streisand); Gil Evans – "Greensleeves" (Kenny Burrell); Bob Florence – "Everything I've Got" (Vikki Carr); Claus Ogerman – "Day by Day" (Astrud Gilberto)	
1967	Ernie Freeman	"Strangers in the Night"	Frank Sinatra	Billy Strange – "These Boots Are Made for Walkin'" (Nancy Sinatra); Don Costa – "If He Walked into My Life" (Eydie Gorme); Brian Wilson – "Good Vibrations" (The Beach Boys); Oliver Nelson – "Goin' Out of My Head" (Wes Montgomery); George Martin – "Eleanor Rigby" (The Beatles)	
1968	Jimmie Haskell	"Ode to Billie Joe"	Bobbie Gentry	Bill Holman, Bones Howe & Ray Pohlman – "Windy" (The Association); Tony Hatch – "Don't Sleep in the Subway" (Petula Clark); Al De Lory – "By The Time I Get to Phoenix" (Glen Campbell); The Beatles – "A Day In The Life"	
1969	Jimmy L. Webb	"MacArthur Park"	Richard Harris	Torrie Zito – "Yesterday I Heard the Rain" (Tony Bennett); Al De Lory – "Wichita Lineman" (Glen Campbell); George Tipton – "Light My Fire" (Jose Feliciano); Dave Grusin – "Fool on the Hill" (Sergio Mendes & Brasil '66)	
1970	Fred Lipsius	"Spinning Wheel"	Blood, Sweat & Tears	Bob Alcivar, Bill Holman & Bones Howe – "Aquarius/Let the Sunshine In" (The 5th Dimension); Al Kooper & Fred Lipsius – "You've Made Me So Very Happy" (Blood, Sweat & Tears); Randy Newman – "Is That All There Is?" (Peggy Lee); Torrie Zito – "I've Gotta Be Me" (Tony Bennett)	
1971	Ernie Freeman, Art Garfunkel, Jimmie Haskell, Larry Knechtel & Paul Simon	"Bridge Over Troubled Water"	Simon and Garfunkel	Dick Halligan – "Lucretia Mac Evil" (Blood, Sweat & Tears); Ray Stevens – "Everything Is Beautiful"; Richard Carpenter – "Close to You" (The Carpenters)	
1972	Paul McCartney	"Uncle Albert/Admiral Halsey"	Paul & Linda McCartney	David Van De Pitte – "What's Going On" (Marvin Gaye); Richard Carpenter – "Superstar" (The Carpenters); Burt Bacharach & Pat Williams – "Long Ago Tomorrow" (BJ Thomas); Michel Colombier – "Freedom and Fear" (Bill Medley)	
1973	Michel Legrand	"What Are You Doing the Rest of Your Life?"	Sarah Vaughan	Michel Legrand – "The Summer Knows" (Sarah Vaughan); Don Sebesky – "Lazy Afternoon" (Jackie and Roy); Don Sebesky – "Day by Day" (Jackie and Roy); Thom Bell – "Betcha by Golly, Wow" (The Stylistics)	
1974	George Martin	"Live and Let Die"	Paul McCartney & Wings	Tom Baird & Gene Page – "Touch Me in the Morning" (Diana Ross); Richard Carpenter – "Sing" (The Carpenters); Dave Grusin – "Rashida" (Jon Lucien); Gene Puerling – "Michelle" (The Singers Unlimited); Dave Grusin – "Lady Love" (Jon Lucien)	
1975	Joni Mitchell & Tom Scott	"Down to You"	Joni Mitchell	Gene Puerling – "Where Is Love" (The Singers Unlimited); Les Hooper & Gene Puerling – "We've Only Just Begun" (The Singers Unlimited); Michael Gibbs – "Smile of the Beyond" (Carol Shive); Chuck Mangione – "Land of Make Believe" (Esther Satterfield)	
1976	Ray Stevens	"Misty"	Ray Stevens	Gene Puerling – "Killing Me Softly with His Song" (The Singers Unlimited); Mel Tormé – "Gershwin Medley"; Gene Puerling – "Autumn in New York" (The Singers Unlimited); Gene Puerling – "April in Paris" (The Singers Unlimited)	
1977	James William Guercio & Jimmie Haskell	"If You Leave Me Now"	Chicago	Robert Farnon – "Sentimental Journey" (The Singers Unlimited); Paul McCartney – "Let 'Em In" (Paul McCartney and Wings); Clare Fischer – "Green Dolphin Street" (The Singers Unlimited); Claus Ogerman – "Boto (Porpoise)" (Antonio Carlos Jobim)	
1978	Ian Freebairn-Smith	"Evergreen (Love Theme from A Star Is Born)"	Barbra Streisand	Seawind – "The Devil is a Liar"; Claus Ogerman – "Nature Boy" (George Benson); Richard Carpenter – "Calling Occupants of Interplanetary Craft" (The Carpenters); Claus Ogerman – "Besame Mucho" (Joao Gilberto)	
1979	Maurice White	"Got to Get You into My Life"	Earth, Wind & Fire	William Pursell – "We Three Kings" (Christmas Festival Chorale and Orchestra); Robert Freedman – "It Happens Very Softly" (Andrea Marcovicci); Tom Tom 84 – "Fantasy" (Earth, Wind & Fire); Chick Corea – "Falling Alice"	
1980	Michael McDonald	"What a Fool Believes"	The Doobie Brothers	Tom Tom 84 – "September" (Earth, Wind & Fire); Richard Evans – "Round Midnight"; Artie Butler & Barry Manilow – "I'll Never Love This Way Again" (Dionne Warwick); Byron Olson – "Everything Must Change" (Bernard Ighner); David Foster & Jerry Hey – "After the Love Has Gone" (Earth, Wind & Fire)	
1981	Christopher Cross & Michael Omartian	"Sailing"	Christopher Cross	Don Costa – "Theme from New York, New York" (Frank Sinatra); Rob McConnell – "Tangerine" (The Singers Unlimited); David Cunningham – "Money" (The Flying Lizards); Burleigh Drummond, David Pack & Joe Puerta – "Biggest Part of Me" (Ambrosia)	
1982	Jerry Hey & Quincy Jones	"Ai No Corrida"	Quincy Jones	Greg Adams – "What is Hip" (Tower of Power); Gino Vannelli, Joe Vannelli & Ross Vannelli – "Living Inside Myself" (Gino Vannelli); Clare Fischer – "Du, Du - 2 + 2" (Clare Fischer's 2+2); Arif Mardin – "And the Melody Still Lingers On (Night in Tunisia)" (Chaka Khan)	
1983	Jerry Hey & David Paich, Jeff Porcaro	"Rosanna"	Toto	Marty Paich – "Only a Miracle" (Kenny Loggins); Donald Fagen & Rob Mounsey – "I.G.Y. (What a Beautiful World)" (Donald Fagen); Les Hooper – "Easy to Love" (The Singers Unlimited); Paul Riser & Stevie Wonder – "Do I Do" (Stevie Wonder)	
1984	Nelson Riddle	"What's New?"	Linda Ronstadt	Tom Canning, Jay Graydon, Jerry Hey & Al Jarreau – "Step by Step" (Al Jarreau); David Foster, Jay Graydon & Jeremy Lubbock – "Mornin'" (Al Jarreau); Arif Mardin – "Be Bop Medley" (Chaka Khan); James Anthony Carmichael & Lionel Richie – "All Night Long (All Night)" (Lionel Richie)	
1985	David Foster & Jeremy Lubbock	"Hard Habit to Break"	Chicago	Michel Legrand – "Papa, Can You Hear Me?" (Barbra Streisand); Thomas Dolby – "Mulu the Rain Forest"; Reggie Griffin & Arif Mardin – "I Feel for You" (Chaka Khan); Laurie Anderson – "Gravity's Angel"	
1986	Nelson Riddle	"Lush Life"	Linda Ronstadt	Peter Wolf – "Why Do People Fall in Love?" (Dennis Edwards and Thelma Houston); David Foster – "Through the Fire" (Chaka Khan); Dave Grusin & Lee Ritenour – "Harlequin"; Ralph Burns & Frank Foster – "Beyond the Sea" (George Benson)	
1987	David Foster	"Somewhere"	Barbra Streisand	Clare Fischer – "Free Fall" (Clare Fischer and His Latin Jazz Sextet); Jorge Calandrelli – "Forget the Woman" (Tony Bennett); Jeremy Lubbock – "A Time for Love" (Diane Schuur)	
1988	Frank Foster	"Deedles' Blues"	Diane Schuur & the Count Basie Orchestra	Randy Kerber – "Over the Rainbow" (Barbra Streisand); Henry Mancini – "It Might as Well Be Spring" (Johnny Mathis and Henry Mancini); Jack Walrath – "I'm So Lonesome I Could Cry"; Bill Ginn & Van Dyke Parks – "A Singer Must Die" (Jennifer Warnes)	
1989	Jonathan Tunick	"No One Is Alone"	Cleo Laine	Henry Mancini – "Volare" (Luciano Pavarotti); Thomas Dolby & Lost Toy People – "The Key to Her Ferrari" (Thomas Dolby & The Lost Toy People); Mike Renzi – "I Wish I'd Met You" (Lena Horne, Sammy Davis Jr.); Marcus Miller – "Funny" (Boz Scaggs)	
1990	Dave Grusin	"My Funny Valentine"	Michelle Pfeiffer	Janet Jackson, Jimmy Jam & Terry Lewis – "Rhythm Nation" (Janet Jackson); Marc Shaiman – "It Had to Be You" (Harry Connick Jr.); Don Sebesky – "Carlotta's Heart" (Carly Simon); Frank Foster – "Bring on the Raindrops" (Frank Foster and Carmen Bradford)	
1991	Glen Ballard, Jerry Hey, Quincy Jones & Clif Magness	"The Places You Find Love"	Siedah Garrett & Chaka Khan	Harry Connick Jr. & Marc Shaiman – "Recipe for Love" (Harry Connick, Jr.); George Duke – "Fumilayo" (Dianne Reeves); Cedric Dent & Mervyn E. Warren – "Come Sunday" (Donna McElroy); Jorge Calandrelli – "Body and Soul" (Tony Bennett)	
1992	Johnny Mandel	"Unforgettable"	Natalie Cole with Nat King Cole	Michel Legrand – "Nature Boy" (Natalie Cole); Harry Connick Jr. – "Blue Light, Red Light (Someone's There)"; Jeremy Lubbock – "Alone in the World" (Patti Austin); Marty Paich – "A Medley of: For Sentimental Reasons/Tenderly/Autumn Leaves" (Natalie Cole)	
1993	Johnny Mandel	"Here's to Life"	Shirley Horn	Mervyn E. Warren – "Why Do the Nations So Furiously Rage?" (Various Artists); Robert Freedman – "Stella by Starlight" (Nnenna Freelon); Robert Farnon – "Lush Live" (Eileen Farrell); Jeremy Lubbock – "Guess I'll Hang Out My Tear Out to Dry" (Diane Schuur)	
1994	David Foster & Jeremy Lubbock	"When I Fall in Love"	Céline Dion & Clive Griffin	David Foster & Johnny Mandel – "Some Enchanted Evening" (Barbra Streisand); Gary Hines – "Santa's Coming to Town" (Sounds of Blackness); Jeremy Lubbock & Mark Portmann – "Luck Be a Lady" (Barbra Streisand); David Foster & Jeremy Lubbock – "I Have Nothing" (Whitney Houston)	
1995	Hans Zimmer & Lebo M	"Circle of Life"	Carmen Twillie featuring Lebo M	Johnny Mandel – "Young at Heart" (Tony Bennett and Shawn Colvin); Alan Broadbent – "Without a Word of Warning" (Mel Tormé); David Foster & Pat Williams – "I've Got a Crush on You" (Frank Sinatra and Barbra Streisand); Jeremy Lubbock – "I Can't Make You Love Me" (Nancy Wilson); Patti Austin, Jerry Hey, Bob James, Lee Ritenour & Mervyn E. Warren – "Ability of Swing" (Patti Austin)	
1996	Rob McConnell	"I Get a Kick Out of You"	Mel Tormé with Rob McConnell & The Boss Brass	Tom Scott – "Stormy Monday Blues" (GRP All-Star Band and B.B. King); Bobby McFerrin – "Bibbidi-Bobbidi-Boo (The Magic Song)"; Rene Dupere & Robbi Finkel – "Alegria" (Cirque Du Soleil); Jeremy Lubbock – "Round Midnight" (Carmen Lundy)	
1997	Alan Broadbent & David Foster	"When I Fall in Love"	Natalie Cole with Nat King Cole	Take 6 – "When You Wish Upon a Star"; John Clayton Jr. – "Teach Me Tonight" (Natalie Cole); Clare Fischer – "In the Still of the Night" (Chanticleer); Quincy Jones & Sam Nestico – "Do Nothing till You Hear from Me" (Phil Collins)	
1998	Slide Hampton	"Cotton Tail"	Dee Dee Bridgewater	Mike Renzi – "The Summer Knows" (Maureen McGovern); Don Sebesky – "Our Love is Here to Stay" (John Pizzarelli); John Clayton – "My Heart Belongs to Daddy" (Dee Dee Bridgewater); Arif Mardin – "Laura" (Carly Simon)	
1999	Herbie Hancock, Robert Sadin & Stevie Wonder	"St. Louis Blues"	Herbie Hancock	George Duke – "The Look of Love" (Marilyn Scott); Rob Mounsey – "Nessun Dorma" (Aretha Franklin); Jeremy Lubbock – "I Believe/You'll Never Walk Alone" (Barbra Streisand); Patrick Williams – "Breath of Heaven (Mary's Song)" (Vince Gill)	
2000	Alan Broadbent	"Lonely Town"	Charlie Haden Quartet West featuring Shirley Horn	David Foster & William Ross – "The Prayer" (Celine Dion and Andrea Bocelli); Randy Cantor – "Livin' la Vida Loca" (Ricky Martin); Johnny Mandel – "In the Wee Small Hours of the Morning" (Barry Manilow); Jorge Calandrelli – "Day Dream" (Tony Bennett)	
2001	Vince Mendoza	"Both Sides Now"	Joni Mitchell	Björk, Vincent Mendoza & Guy Sigsworth – "I've Seen It All" (Björk featuring Thom Yorke); Jorge Calandrelli – "Dream" (Ettore Stratta & His Orchestra); Nnenna Freelon – "Button Up Your Overcoat"; Vince Mendoza – "A Case of You" (Joni Mitchell)	
2002	Paul Buckmaster	"Drops of Jupiter (Tell Me)"	Train	Johnny Mandel – "You're My Thrill" (Shirley Horn); Claus Ogerman – "Love Letters" (Diana Krall); Billy Childs – "Fascinating Rhythm" (Dianne Reeves); Kurt Elling & Laurence Hobgood – "Easy Living" (Kurt Elling)	
2003	Dave Grusin	"Mean Old Man"	James Taylor	Vanessa Carlton & Ron Fair – "A Thousand Miles" (Vanessa Carlton); Vincent Mendoza – "Since You've Asked" (Jane Monheit); Alan Broadbent – "I'm Glad There Is You" (Natalie Cole); Jorge Calandrelli – "Esta Tarde Vi Llover" (José Cura)	
2004	Vince Mendoza	"Woodstock"	Joni Mitchell	John Patitucci – "In the Bleak Midwinter"; Gordon Goodwin – "Comes Love" (Gordon Goodwin's Big Phat Band featuring Brian McKnight and Take 6); Jorge Calandrelli – "Chega de Saudade" (Yo-Yo Ma & Rosa Passos); Chick Corea & Bobby McFerrin – "Armando's Rumba"	
2005	Victor Vanacore	"Over the Rainbow"	Ray Charles & Johnny Mathis	Steve Gaboury, Cyndi Lauper & Don Sebesky – "Unchained Melody" (Cyndi Lauper); John Clayton & David W. Foster – "Summertime" (Renee Olstead); Joseph Joubert, Michael McElroy & Buryl A. Red – "Joy to the World" (Michael McElroy and the Broadway Inspirational Voices with Joseph Joubert); Vincent Mendoza – "Dancing in the Dark" (Jane Monheit)	
2006	Billy Childs, Gil Goldstein and Heitor Pereira	"What Are You Doing the Rest of Your Life?"	Chris Botti & Sting	Jorge Calandrelli – "Time to Smile" (Tony Bennett); Don Hart – "Scary Things" (John Bindel & Nashville Chamber Orchestra); Claus Ogerman – "I Should Care" (Diana Krall); John Clayton Jr. & David Foster – "Can't Buy Me Love" (Michael Bublé)	
2007	Jorge Calandrelli	"For Once in My Life"	Tony Bennett and Stevie Wonder	Gil Goldstein – "Suninga"; Slide Hampton – "Stardust" (Dizzy Gillespie All-Star Big Band); Vincent Mendoza – "My Flame Burns Blue (Blood Count)" (Elvis Costello with the Metropole Orkest); Gil Goldstein & Greg Phillinganes – "Good Morning Heartache" (Chris Botti & Jill Scott)	
2008	John Clayton	"I'm Gonna Live Till I Die"	Queen Latifah	Pete McGuinness – "Smile" (The Pete McGuinness Jazz Orchestra); Michael Abene – "Overture/Gershwin Medley" (Patti Austin); Jay Ashby, Darmon Meader & Kim Nazarian – "In the Wee Small Hours of the Morning" (New York Voices); Jorge Calandrelli – "Cry Me a River" (Ella Fitzgerald & Jorge Calandrelli)	
2009	Nan Schwartz	"Here's That Rainy Day"	Natalie Cole	Claus Ogerman – "Lazy Afternoon" (Danilo Pérez); Don Sebesky – "Johnny One Note" (John Pizzarelli); Cedric Dent – "Grace" (Take 6); Vincent Mendoza – "Alfie" (Traincha & the Metropole Orchestra)	
2010	Claus Ogerman	"Quiet Nights"	Diana Krall	Vince Mendoza – "My One and Only Thrill" (Melody Gardot); Thomas Zink – "In the Still of the Night" (Anne Walsh); Laurence Hobgood – "Dedicated to You" (Kurt Elling); David Foster & Jerry Hey – "A Change is Gonna Come" (Seal)	
2011	Christopher Tin	"Baba Yetu"	Christopher Tin, Soweto Gospel Choir and the Royal Philharmonic Orchestra	Herbie Hancock & Larry Klein – "Imagine" (Herbie Hancock, Pink, Seal, Jeff Beck, India.Arie, Konono Nº1 & Oumou Sangare); Geoffrey Keezer – "Don't Explain" (Denise Donatelli); Vincent Mendoza – "Based on a Thousand True Stories" (Silje Nergaard & Metropole Orchestra Strings); Roger Treece – "Baby" (Bobby McFerrin)	
2012	Jorge Calandrelli	"Who Can I Turn To (When Nobody Needs Me)"	Tony Bennett & Queen Latifah	Vince Mendoza – "Ao Mar"; Nicola Tescari – "Moon Over Bourbon Street" (Sting & The Royal Philharmonic Concert Orchestra); Kevin Axt, Ray Brinker, Trey Henry, Christian Jacob & Tierney Sutton – "On Broadway" (The Tierney Sutton Band); William A. Ross – "The Windmills of Your Mind" (Barbra Streisand)	
2013	Thara Memory & Esperanza Spalding	"City of Roses"	Esperanza Spalding	Gil Evans – "Look to the Rainbow" (The Gil Evans Project & Luciana Souza); Shelly Berg – "Out There" (Lorraine Feather); Vince Mendoza – "Spain (I Can Recall)" (Al Jarreau & The Metropole Orchestra); Nan Schwartz – "Wild is the Wind" (Whitney Claire Kaufman & Andrew Playfoot)	
2014	Gil Goldstein	"Swing Low"	Bobby McFerrin & Esperanza Spalding	Nan Schwarz – "La Vida Nos Espera" (Gian Marco); Chris Walden – "Let's Fall In Love" (Calabria Foti featuring Seth Justman); John Hollenbeck – "The Moon's A Harsh Mistress" (John Hollenbeck); Shelly Berg – "What a Wonderful World" (Gloria Estefan)	
2015	Billy Childs	"New York Tendaberry"	Billy Childs featuring Renée Fleming & Yo Yo Ma	Jeremy Fox – "All My Tomorrows" (Jeremy Fox featuring Kate McGarry); Vince Mendoza – "Goodnight America" (Mary Chapin Carpenter); Gordon Goodwin – "Party Rockers" (Gordon Goodwin's Big Phat Band); Pete McGuinness – "What Are You Doing The Rest of Your Life?" (The Pete McGuinness Jazz Orchestra)	
2016	Maria Schneider	"Sue (Or in a Season of Crime)"	David Bowie	Shelly Berg – "Be My Muse" (Lorraine Feather); Patrick Williams – "52nd & Broadway" (Patrick Williams featuring Patti Austin); Otmaro Ruiz – "Garota de Ipanema" (Catina DeLuna featuring Otmaro Ruiz); Jimmy Greene – "When I Come Home" (Jimmy Greene & Javier Colon)	
2017	Jacob Collier	"Flintstones"	Jacob Collier	Gordon Goodwin – "Do You Hear What I Hear" (Gordon Goodwin's Big Phat Band featuring Take 6); John Daversa – "Do You Want To Know a Secret" (John Daversa featuring Renee Olstead); Alan Broadbent – "I'm a Fool to Want You" (Kristin Chenoweth); Billy Childs & Larry Klein – "Somewhere (Dirty Blvd)" (Lang Lang featuring Lisa Fischer & Jeffrey Wright)	
2018	Randy Newman	"Putin"	Randy Newman	Justin Hurwitz – "Another Day of Sun" (The La La Land Cast); Jorge Calandrelli – "Every Time We Say Goodbye" (Clint Holmes featuring Jane Monheit); Joel McNeely – "I Like Myself" (Seth MacFarlane); Shelly Berg, Gregg Field, Gordon Goodwin & Clint Holmes – "I Loves You Porgy/There's A Boat That's Leavin' Soon For New York" (Clint Holmes featuring Dee Dee Bridgewater & The Count Basie Orchestra)	
2019	Randy Waldman	"Spiderman Theme"	Randy Waldman featuring Take 6 & Chris Potter	Matt Rollings & Kristin Wilkinson – "It Was A Very Good Year" (Willie Nelson); Dan Pugach & Nicole Zuraitis – "Jolene" (Dan Pugach); Vince Mendoza – "Mona Lisa" (Gregory Porter); Gonzalo Grau – "Niña" (Magos Herrera & Brooklyn Rider)	
2020	Jacob Collier	"All Night Long"	Jacob Collier featuring Jules Buckley, Take 6 & the Metropole Orkest	Geoff Keezer – "Jolene" (Sara Gazarek); Cyrille Aimée & Diego Figueiredo – "Marry Me A Little" (Cyrille Aimée); Vince Mendoza – "Over the Rainbow" (Trisha Yearwood); Esperanza Spalding – "12 Little Spells (Thoracic Spine)"	
2021	Jacob Collier	"He Won't Hold You"	Jacob Collier featuring Rapsody	John Beasley & Maria Mendes – "Asas Fechadas" (Maria Mendes featuring John Beasley & the Metropole Orkest); Erin Bentlage, Sara Gazarek, Johnaye Kendrick & Amanda Taylor – "Desert Song" (Säje); Alan Broadbent & Pat Metheny – "From This Place" (Pat Metheny & Meshell Ndegeocello); Talia Billig, Nic Hard & Becca Stevens – "Slow Burn" (Becca Stevens featuring Jacob Collier, Mark Lettieri, Justin Stanton, Jordan Perlson, Nic Hard, Keita Ogawa, Marcelo Woloski & Nate Werth)	
2022	Vince Mendoza	"To The Edge of Longing (Edit Version)"	The Czech National Symphony Orchestra, Vince Mendoza & Julia Bullock	Ólafur Arnalds – "The Bottom Line" (Ólafur Arnalds & Josin); Tehillah Alphonso – "A Change Is Gonna Come" (Tonality & Alexander Lloyd Blake); Jacob Collier – "The Christmas Song (Chestnuts Roasting On An Open Fire)"; Cody Fry – "Eleanor Rigby"	
2023	Vince Mendoza	"Songbird (Orchestral Version)"	Christine McVie	Louis Cole - "Let It Happen" (Louis Cole); Jacob Collier - "Never Gonna Be Alone" (Jacob Collier featuring Lizzy McAlpine & John Mayer); Sullivan Fortner - "Optimistic Voices/No Love Dying" (Cécile McLorin Salvant); Nathan Schram & Becca Stevens - "2 + 2 = 5 (Arr. Nathan Schram)" (Becca Stevens & Attacca Quartet)	
2024	Erin Bentlage, Jacob Collier, Sara Gazarek, Johnaye Kendrick & Amanda Taylor	"In the Wee Small Hours of the Morning"	säje featuring Jacob Collier	Gordon Goodwin – "April in Paris" (Patti Austin featuring Gordon Goodwin's Big Phat Band); John Beasley & Maria Mendes – "Com Que Voz (Live)" (Maria Mendes featuring John Beasley & The Metropole Orkest); Godwin Louis – "Fenestra" (Cécile McLorin Salvant); Kendrick McCallister - "Lush Life" (Samara Joy)	
2025	Erin Bentlage, Sara Gazarek, Johnaye Kendrick & Amanda Taylor	"Alma"	säje featuring Regina Carter	Matt Jones – "Always Come Back" (John Legend); Willow, Chris Greatti, Zach Tenorio – "b i g f e e l i n g s" (Willow); Charlie Rosen & Jake Silverman – "Last Surprise" (The 8-bit Big Band featuring Jonah Nilsson & Button Masher); Cody Fry – "The sound of silence" (Cody Fry featuring Sleeping At Last)	
2026	Erin Bentlage, Sara Gazarek, Johnaye Kendrick, Nate Smith & Amanda Taylor	"Big Fish"	Nate Smith ft. Säje	Nelson Riddle – "How Did She Look?" (Seth MacFarlane); Jacob Collier – "Keep An Eye On Summer" (Jacob Collier); Clyde Lawrence, Gracie Lawrence & Linus Lawrence – "Something In The Water (Acoustic-ish)" (Lawrence); Cody Fry – "What A Wonderful World" (Cody Fry)	
2027	Winner TBA on 7 February 2027			Hendric Buenck, Russel Emanuel, Rachel Keen, Mike Sabath & Hans Zimmer – "Click Clack Symphony" (Raye featuring Hans Zimmer); Phoebe Bridgers, Christian Lee Hutson, Rob Moose & Caroline Shaw – "The Governor's Waltz" (Phoebe Bridgers); Nan Schwartz – "Moon River" (Studio Intensive Orchestra featuring Nnenna Freelon); Darcy James Argue – "Send In the Clowns" (Cécile McLorin Salvant, Metrople Orkest & Jules Buckley); Chris Greatti, Zach Tenorio & Willow Smith – "Shrink to Fantasy" (Willow); J.D. Beck, Noé Degalle & Domi Louna – "Small Eyes" (Domi & J.D. Beck)	
