= I Hear a Rhapsody (Josh Nelson album) =

Studio album by Josh Nelson
- Released: June 21, 2009
- Genre: Jazz
- Length: 77:29
- Label: Steal Bird Music
- Producers: Josh Nelson, Tom Catanzaro

Josh Nelson chronology
Let It Go (2007)	I Hear a Rhapsody (2009)	Discoveries (2011)

I Hear a Rhapsody is the fourth studio album by jazz pianist Josh Nelson. It was released by Steel Bird Music on June 21, 2009.

== Track listing ==
All music is composed by Josh Nelson, except noted.

No.	Title	Length
1.	"A Nightingale Sang in Berkeley Square" (Manning Sherwin, Eric Maschwitz)	6:12
2.	"A Change in the Wind"	6:42
3.	"I Hear a Rhapsody" (George Fragos, Jack Baker, Bard, Dick Gasparre)	6:12
4.	"Bhutto Song"	6:14
5.	"Theme from "Chinatown"" (Jerry Goldsmith)	5:04
6.	"Nebulous"	10:48
7.	"Mint Blues"	7:50
8.	"Everything Means Nothing to Me" (Elliott Smith)	6:27
9.	"Lullaby for Ludvig"	3:41
10.	"The Antidote"	7:28
11.	"Here's That Rainy Day" (Van Heusen, Johnny Burke)	6:52
12.	"Prognosticator"	3:43

== Personnel ==
- Josh Nelson - Piano, Fender Rhodes, Trumpet, Voive
- Ben Wendel - Tenor Saxophone, Bassoon (on tracks 2 & 4)
- Tom Catanzaro - Tenor and Soprano Saxophone (on tracks 6, 7, 10)
- Charles Altura - Guitar (on tracks 6, 7, 10)
- Hamilton Price - Bass
- Sam Minaie - Bass (on tracks 2, 4, 8)
- Kevin Kanner - Drums, Percussion
- Zach Harmon - Drums, Percussion (on tracks 2, 4, 8)
