= Dan Siegel (musician) =

American musical artist

- Born: Seattle, Washington, U.S.
- Genres: Jazz, smooth jazz
- Occupation: Musician
- Instrument: Piano
- Years active: 1976–present
- Labels: Inner City, Epic, Native Language
- Website: www.dansiegelmusic.com

Dan Siegel (born in Seattle, Washington) is an American pianist, composer, and record producer. His earlier music has been described as new age, while his more recent work has been called contemporary jazz.

== Music career ==
Siegel was born in Seattle, Washington, and raised in Eugene, Oregon. When he was eight years old, he began piano lessons, and at 12 he was performing professionally in a rock band. He went to the Berklee College of Music in Boston, then studied at the University of Oregon. After college, he started recording his own compositions. He signed with the jazz record label Inner City Records and recorded his first album, Nite Ride (1980). His second album, The Hot Spot (1982), reached the top 10 of the jazz chart in Billboard magazine.

He moved to Los Angeles and composed music for movies and television. In 1986, he signed with Epic Records and released a series of smooth jazz albums.

In parallel he produced and recorded three albums with the fusion/mainstream band Birds of a Feather—Birds of a Feather, Above the Clouds, and Stand Together—and released the self-titled album by the band Future Prospect.

== Television and film work ==
Siegel's work as a television and film composer includes the score for the film Reform School Girls (1986), and Universal Studios television series, Hard Copy (1987). He has also worked as musical director and conductor on the late-night CBS TV show Overtime... with Pat O'Brien (1990). He has played on numerous television and film projects as a session player, including the Oscar-winning film The Usual Suspects. His music was also featured on the Weather Channel's Local Forecast segments from 1986 to 1991.

== Discography ==
=== Studio albums ===
- 1980: Nite Ride (Inner City)
- 1981: The Hot Shot (Inner City)
- 1981: Oasis (Inner City)
- 1982: Dan Siegel (Elektra)
- 1983: Reflections (Epic)
- 1984: Another Time, Another Place (Epic)
- 1985: On the Edge (Epic)
- 1986: Short Stories (Epic)
- 1987: Northern Nights (Columbia)
- 1989: Late One Night (Epic)
- 1991: Going Home (Epic)
- 1993: The Getaway (Sin-Drome)
- 1995 Hemispheres (Sunset Boulevard)
- 1998: Clairvoyance (Countdown)
- 2001: Key of Joy (Pony Canyon)
- 2004: Inside Out (Native Language)
- 2006 Departure (Native Language)
- 2008: Fables (Native Language)
- 2009: Sphere (DSM), also available as Sphere Triple Deluxe, a 3-CD set containing additionally to Sphere the 2 albums Fables and Departure
- 2014: Indigo (DSM)
- 2018: Origins (DSM)
- 2021: Faraway Place (DSM)
- 2024: Unity (DSM)

=== Compilation albums ===
- 2000: Along The Way, The Best of Dan Siegel (Sony) (includes 1 new song - From the Heart)
- 2016: The Inner City Years, a 3-CD set containing the albums Nite Ride, The Hot Shot and Oasis

=== with Birds of a Feather ===
- 1987: Birds of A Feather (Optimism)
- 1994: Above the Clouds (Brainchild)
- 1996: Stand Together (Playful)

=== with Future Prospect ===
- 1987: Future Prospect (Optimism)
