= Josh Nelson =

American jazz pianist and composer (born 1978)

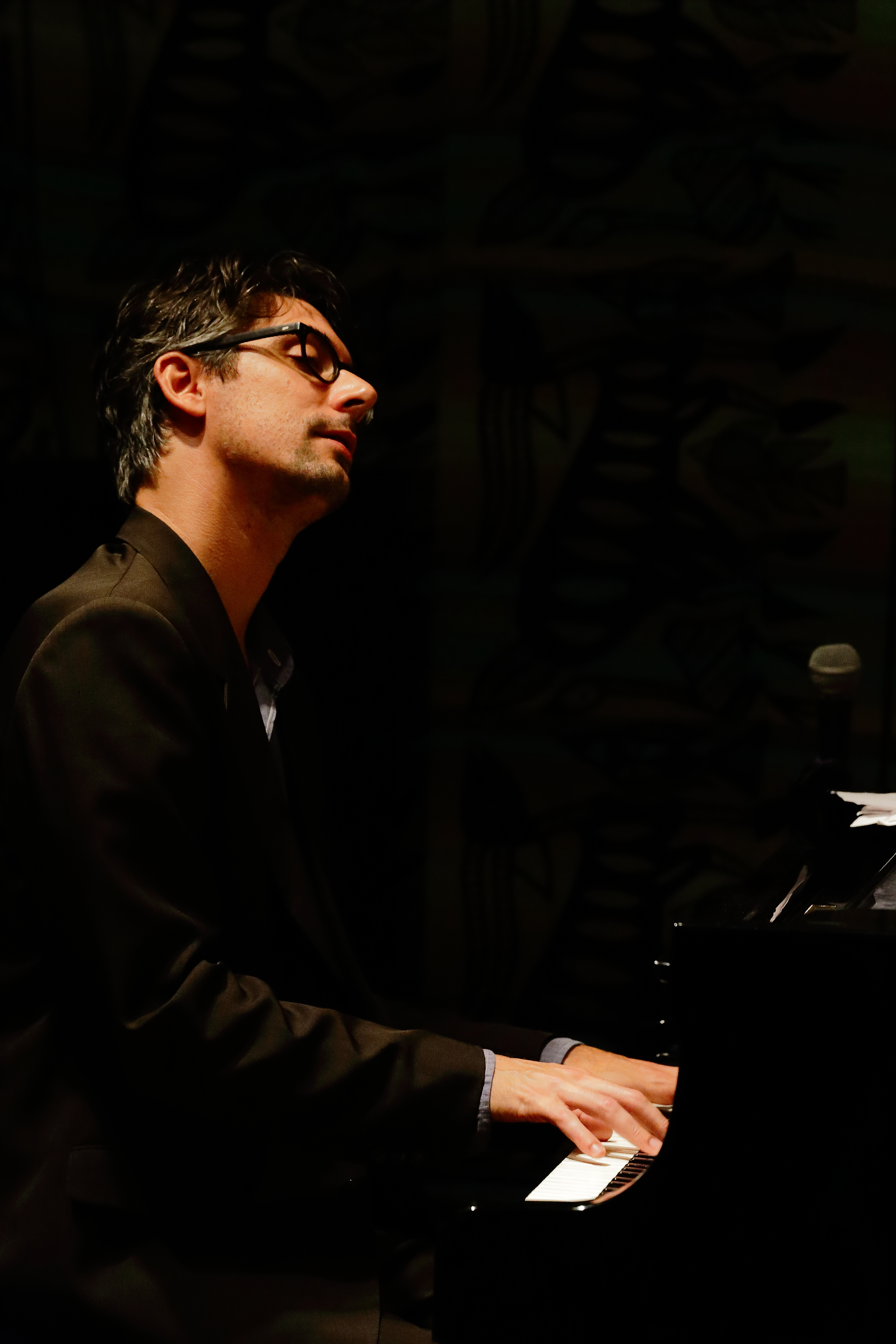
- Josh Nelson at Japan 2013

Background information
- Born: August 1, 1978 (age 48)
- Genres: Jazz
- Occupations: Musician, composer
- Instruments: Piano, keyboards
- Years active: 1998–present
- Labels: Steel Bird, Native Language
- Website: joshnelsonmusic.com

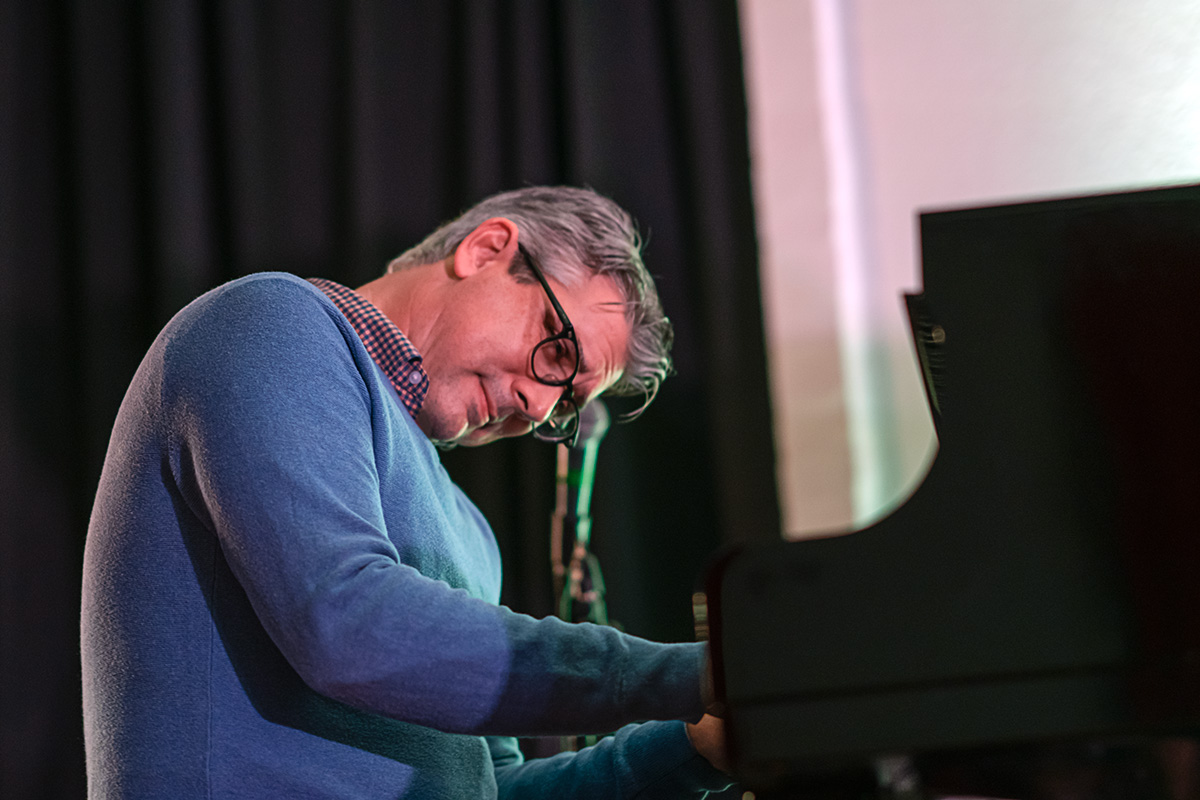
Aarhus, Denmark, 2026

Josh Nelson is an American jazz pianist and composer.

Nelson produced his independent debut album First Stories at age 19. His second album, Anticipation, was released in 2004 with all his compositions. In 2007, Nelson signed with the jazz label Native Language Music and released his third album, Let It Go, with guests Seamus Blake, Sara Gazarek, and Anthony Wilson. His fourth album, I Hear a Rhapsody, was released in 2009 with Nelson's compositions, interpretations of standards, and reinventions of rock songs. In 2011, he released his fifth album, Discoveries, which was influenced by the writings of Jules Verne, H.G. Wells, and Nikola Tesla.

Nelson has worked with Jeff Hamilton, Peter Erskine, and Sara Gazarek, for whom he has written songs and serves as musical director He toured worldwide with vocalist Natalie Cole. One of Gazarek's albums, for which Nelson composed various pieces, and which featured a band led by Nelson, reached number ten on Billboard's Top Jazz Albums chart.

Nelson has been described by jazz critic Chuck Berg as a "brilliant young player whose virtuosity suggest the urbane yet bluesy tradition of Oscar Peterson and Gene Harris", and by journalist and critic Josef Woodard as possessing "his own clean-burning modern mode of jazz".

== Discography ==
=== As leader ===
- First Stories (Steel Bird Music, 1998)
- Let It Go (Omagatoki, 2007)
- I Hear a Rhapsody (Steel Bird Music, 2009)
- Discoveries (Steel Bird Music, 2011)
- Exploring Mars (Origin, 2015)
- Duo Core (Port, 2015)
- Dream in the Blue (Steel Bird Music, 2016)
- The Sky Remains (Origin, 2017)
- The Discovery Project (Steel Bird Music, 2020)
