= Native Language Music =

Jazz record label in California, US

- Founded: 1996
- Founder: Theo Bishop, Joe Sherbanee
- Genre: Jazz
- Country of origin: U.S.
- Location: Irvine, California
- Official website: www.nativelanguage.com

Native Language Music is a jazz record label founded in 1996 by Theo Bishop and Joe Sherbanee in Southern California.

== Roster ==
- Theo Bishop
- Erin Bode
- East West Quintet
- Four80East
- Sara Gazarek
- Tony Guerrero
- Warren Hill
- Jeff Kashiwa
- Josh Nelson
- Adam Niewood
- Gerry Niewood
- Dan Siegel
- Andy Snitzer
- Turning Point

== See also ==
- List of record labels
