= Sara Gazarek =

American jazz singer (born 1982)

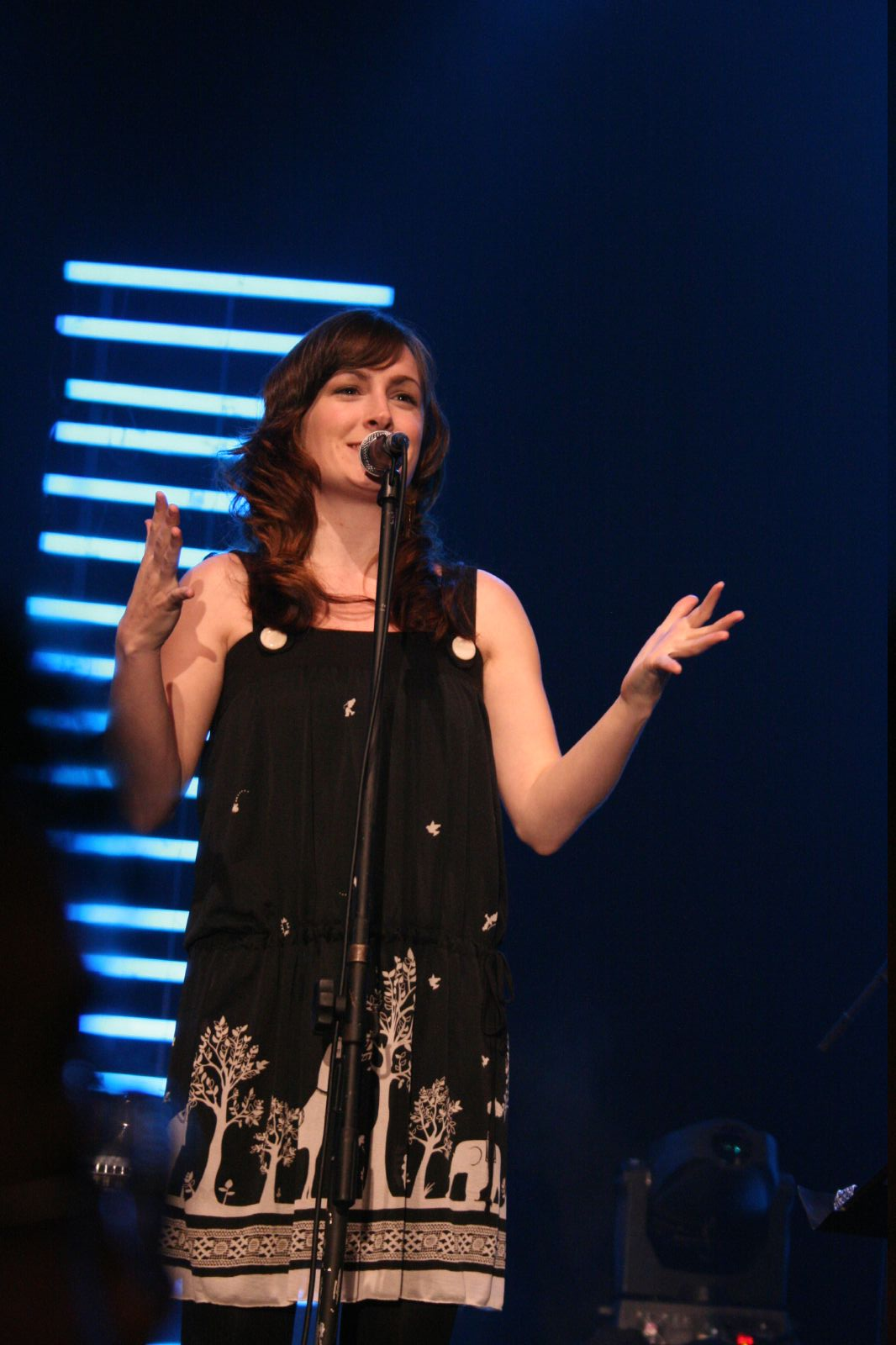
- Gazarek at the 2008 Java Jazz Festival

Background information
- Born: February 26, 1982 (age 44); Seattle, Washington, U.S.
- Genres: Jazz, pop, rock
- Occupation: Singer
- Years active: 2005–present
- Labels: Native Language, Palmetto
- Website: www.saragazarek.com

Sara Gazarek is an American jazz singer from Seattle.

== Life and career ==
Gazarek was born in Seattle, Washington and moved to Los Angeles in 2000 to attend the Thornton School of Music at the University of Southern California. In college her teachers included Carmen Bradford, John Clayton, and Tierney Sutton. Clayton produced her first album, Yours (2005). The album was a critical and commercial success with a top ten ranking in the Billboard Traditional Jazz Charts as well as being the top album download in iTunes for Jazz in Germany and France. Clayton also produced her second album, Return to You (2007). She recorded Where Time Stands Still (2010) with the German band Triosence. In the liner notes for Blossom and Bee (2012) she cited the influence of Blossom Dearie. She produced her album Thirsty Ghost.

Gazarek returned to the University of Southern California to accept a job on the faculty of jazz studies. Since 2023, she has taught at the Eastman School of Music.

Since 2020, Gazarek is a member of säje. She shared in the group's 2024 and 2025 Grammy Award for Best Arrangement, Instrumental and Vocals.

== Awards and honors ==
- Outstanding Jazz Vocalist Award, Ella Fitzgerald Foundation
- Best Collegiate Vocalist, DownBeat magazine, 2003
- Grammy nomination for album Thirsty Ghost, 2019

== Discography ==
=== As leader ===
- Yours (Native Language, 2005)
- Live at the Jazz Bakery (Native Language, 2006)
- Return to You (Native Language, 2007)
- Blossom & Bee (Palmetto, 2012)
- Duo with Josh Nelson (Core Port, 2015)
- Dream in the Blue with Josh Nelson (Steel Bird, 2016)
- Thirsty Ghost (2019)
- Vanity (2022)

=== As guest ===
- Triosence, Where Time Stands Still (Sony, 2010)
