= Range Rover (song) =

Single by Devin Dawson and Ben Rector featuring Steve Winwood
- Released: Devin Dawson: October 2, 2020; Ben Rector: May 21, 2021
- Length: Devin Dawson: 3:18; Ben Rector: 3:20
- Songwriters: Ben Rector; Devin Dawson; Mark Trussell

"Range Rover" is the name of two songs by American singer-songwriters Devin Dawson and Ben Rector. The original draft was co-written by Dawson, Rector, and songwriter Mark Trussell, and two singles were released: Dawson's version in 2020, and Rector's version in 2021.

The song was conceived during a songwriting session between the three. Trussell made a joke about his rising success leading to his wife wanting to buy an all-white Range Rover, prompting Rector to suggest writing a song similar to "Gold Digger" by Kanye West featuring Jamie Foxx; a man who is looking for a woman who is interested in more than just the money and status. Dawson's version features instrumentation that emphasize the country music genre, and Rector's version features Steve Winwood on the Hammond organ. Both versions also have minor lyric differences. The song was composed to be unique and out of their comfort zones.

Dawson released his song as a single from his extended play (EP) The Pink Slip on October 2, 2020, followed by the full EP release on January 15, 2021, under Warner Records and Atlantic Records. Rector, after shelving the song temporarily and reworking it, released it as a single through OK Kid Recordings. Both would later release live versions; Dawson's was a recorded performance without an audience due to the COVID-19 pandemic, and Rector's was performed as an a capella with Stephen Day and Jordy Searcy.

== Background ==
"Range Rover" was co-written by Devin Dawson, Ben Rector, and Mark Trussell. Rector had performed with Trussell in the past, and Trussell had recently began collaborating with Devin Dawson. Dawson was also a big fan of Rector's work, and an original songwriting collaboration helped shaped the music on Dawson's debut album Dark Horse. The three had songwriting sessions a few times in the past, and began their session by catching up with each other's lives.

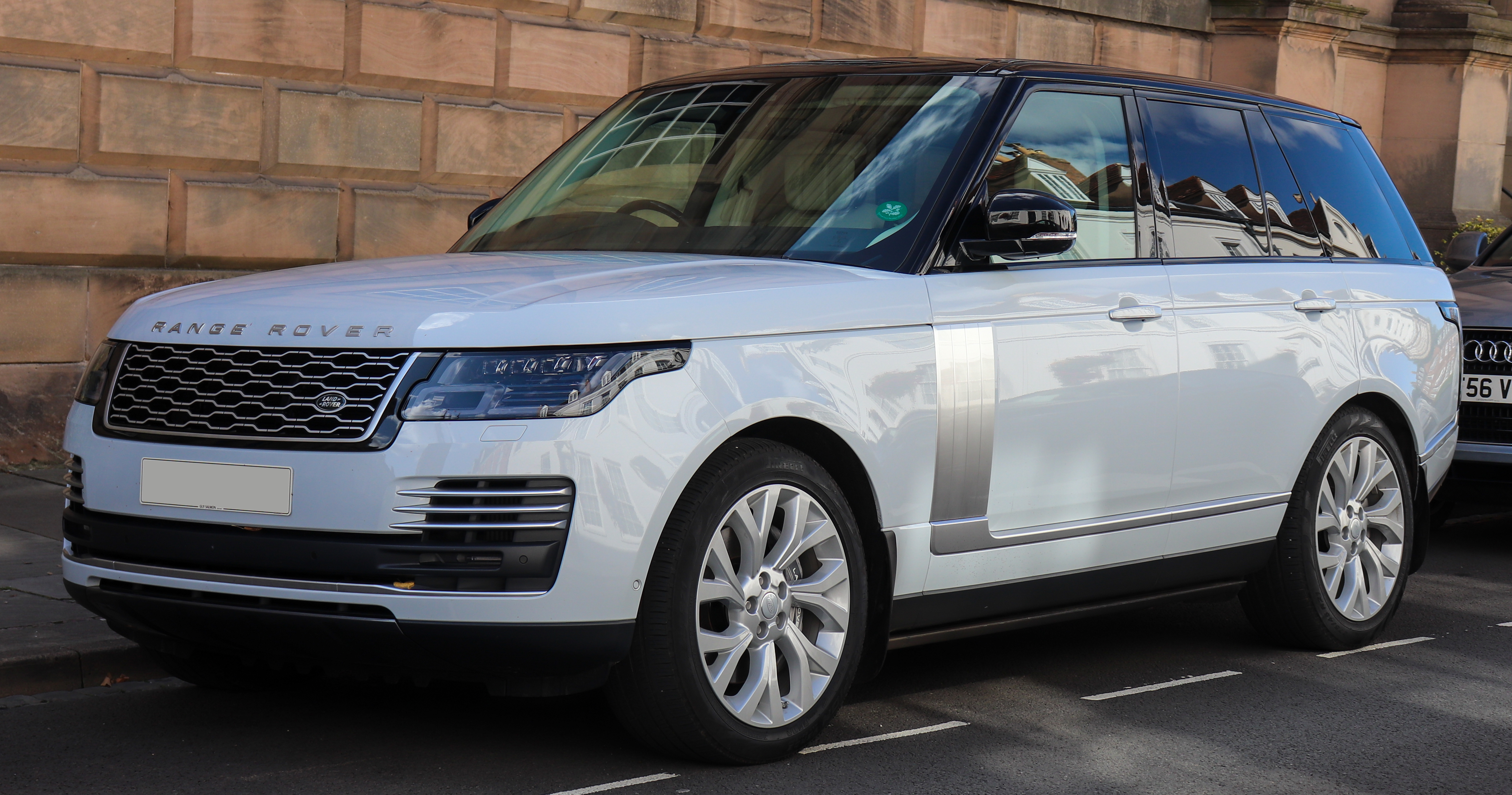
An all-white Range Rover

Trussell had found rising success in his recently released music and began having radio appearances, and the two joked about how he would need to buy his wife a new car; Trussell mentioned in return that his wife wanted to buy an all-white Range Rover. Rector and Dawson joked about how they didn't believe she was "the stereotypical trophy wife" that was interested in only the money and status of the relationship. Rector saw potential in writing a song about true love beyond money. He pitched the idea as "'Gold Digger' by Kanye, but it’s 'Range Rover.'" The other two were skeptical at first, but after considering and drafting other song ideas Rector convinced them to return to the concept.

== Composition ==
The songs discuss the perspective of a man who had broken up with someone who was in a shallow relationship: although she was perfect to everyone else, he was not fond of her ulterior motives, how she was only interested in the material possession and the status. Dawson explained it as "She was looking for the Range Rover, and I'm just looking for a girl who's down to ride in my beat-up truck with the windows down and just having a good time listening to country music". Rector recalled the songwriting process going smoothly, as if "riding a wave." They recorded a demo that day with Rector performing the vocals. The original demo that featured Rector's additions were changed by Dawson to emphasize more of the country genre: instead of "Civic" and "two-seater", Dawson's variation mentioned "pickup" and "bench-seater". Rector's original lyrics mentioned musician Steve Winwood because Rector was wearing a Steve Winwood shirt the day of recording; Dawson replaced the name with country musician Keith Whitley.

"It's cheeky, and cheeky isn't usually something I'm so good at—I'm not good at being funny—but it had the right kind of chip on its shoulder for me."

— Devin Dawson, 2021

"I feel like most of my music is super-earnest, and that's probably what I value and how I am in real life. This is obviously a tongue-in-cheek song. Part of me was like, 'is this going to be weird?' People obviously know that I’m married and have kids. I’m not singing in first-person from my own life."

— Ben Rector, 2021

The three of them being a fan of unique chord progressions, they used a selection of chords not typically used in country songs. The song was recorded at a studio in Los Angeles, California. An hour into the recording session Dawson felt the song was too jazz-forward, so he introduced Trussell on electric guitar, resulting in everyone performing to match the energy. Both Dawson and Rector felt it was not a song typical of their other work; Dawson considered the song comedic, something he doesn't usually do in his work, and Rector felt the song was too outside his scope of storytelling, since most songs are from his perspective and "people obviously know that I’m married and have kids".

== Release ==
=== From Devin Dawson ===
Dawson released his version of "Range Rover" as a single from his upcoming extended play (EP) The Pink Slip on October 2, 2020. The full EP released January 15, 2021, under Warner Records and Atlantic Records. Dawson released a music video for the single on November 13, 2020, including performances from his wife Leah Sykes Durrett as his girlfriend and Rector as a real estate agent. It was directed by Tyler Conrad, a videographer and friend of Dawson. A live performance of "Range Rover" was done as part of The Pink Slip EP Live, via a recording with no audience present due to the restrictions amidst the COVID-19 pandemic. According to Dawson, "This was the first time my band and I had played these songs since we finished recording them earlier that year and was the first time I had really sang in months." The Pink Slip EP Live released April 23, 2021.

=== From Ben Rector ===
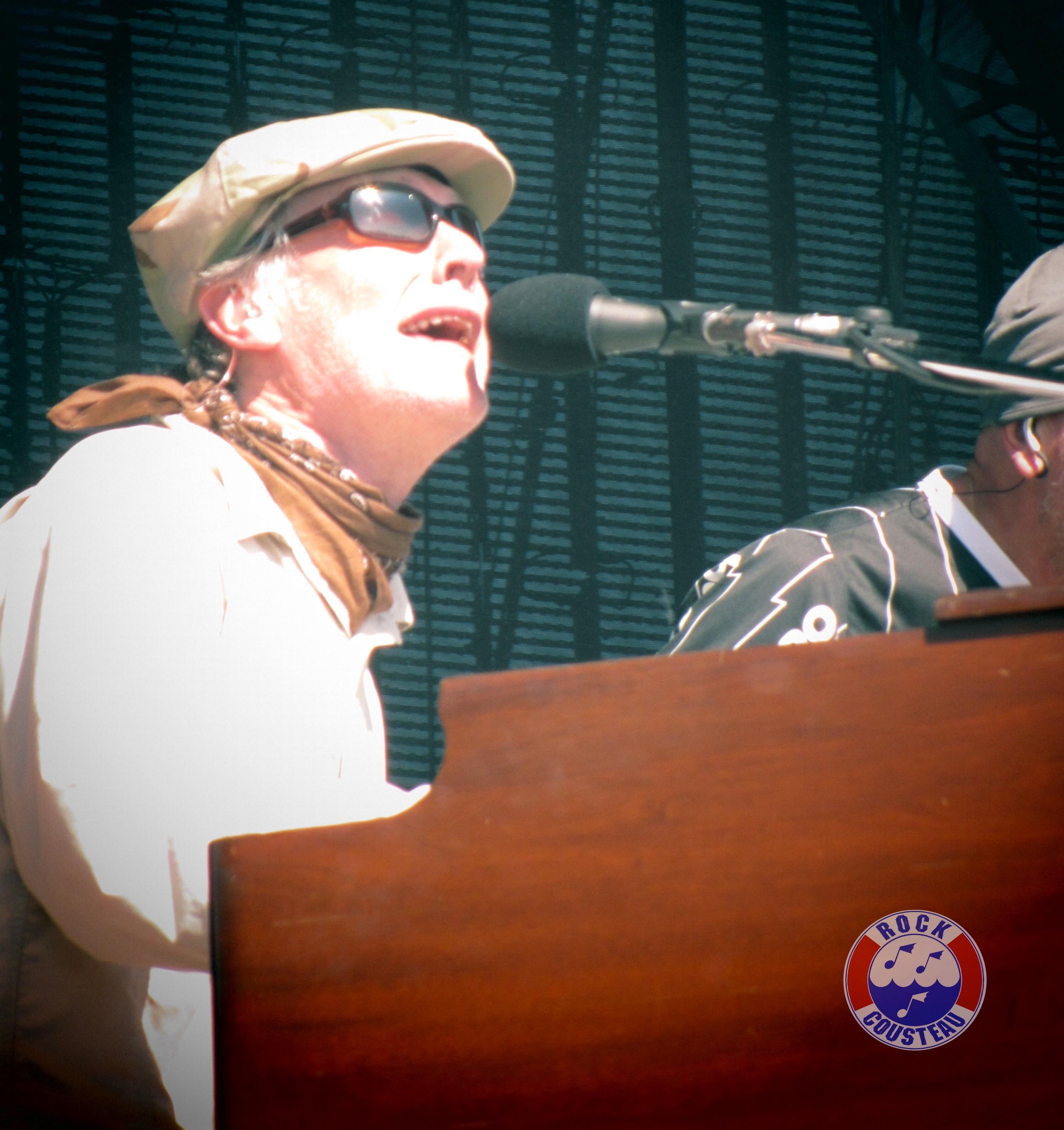
Rector's version featured Steve Winwood on the Hammond organ

The song was completed prior to the COVID-19 pandemic, but Rector shelved his version for some time. When he returned to the song he began reworking the song with producer John Fields, using his original penned lyrics. An attempt to introduce West coast hip-hop instrumentation failed, and considering their options, Fields suggested they have Winwood featured on the tack; the song was originally intended to be included on Rector's next studio album following Magic, and many established artists were featured. Although Rector was skeptical he would not do it since he usually does not feature on other songs, Winwood accepted immediately. Winwood played the Hammond organ on the song, per his request.

As he continued reworking his next album, which would be The Joy of Music, it had "taken a pretty specific shape with some themes" according to Rector. Knowing that he wanted to release the song but felt it wouldn't belong on The Joy of Music, he opted to release the song as a single. Rector's version of "Range Rover" released on May 21, 2021, through OK Kid Recordings; it was his first release of 2021. A lyric video was released the same day, depicting a road trip. Rector performed a promotional live tour for The Joy of Music, and on the setlist was an a capella version of "Range Rover", performed by Rector, Jordy Searcy, and Stephen Day. "Range Rover (A Capella)" was included in a live recording, Live From Atlanta, released on July 31, 2023. The song was also played at The Old Friends Acoustic Tour in 2023.

== See also ==
- "All on Me", a single by Devin Dawson
- Ben Rector discography
