= Ben Rector discography =

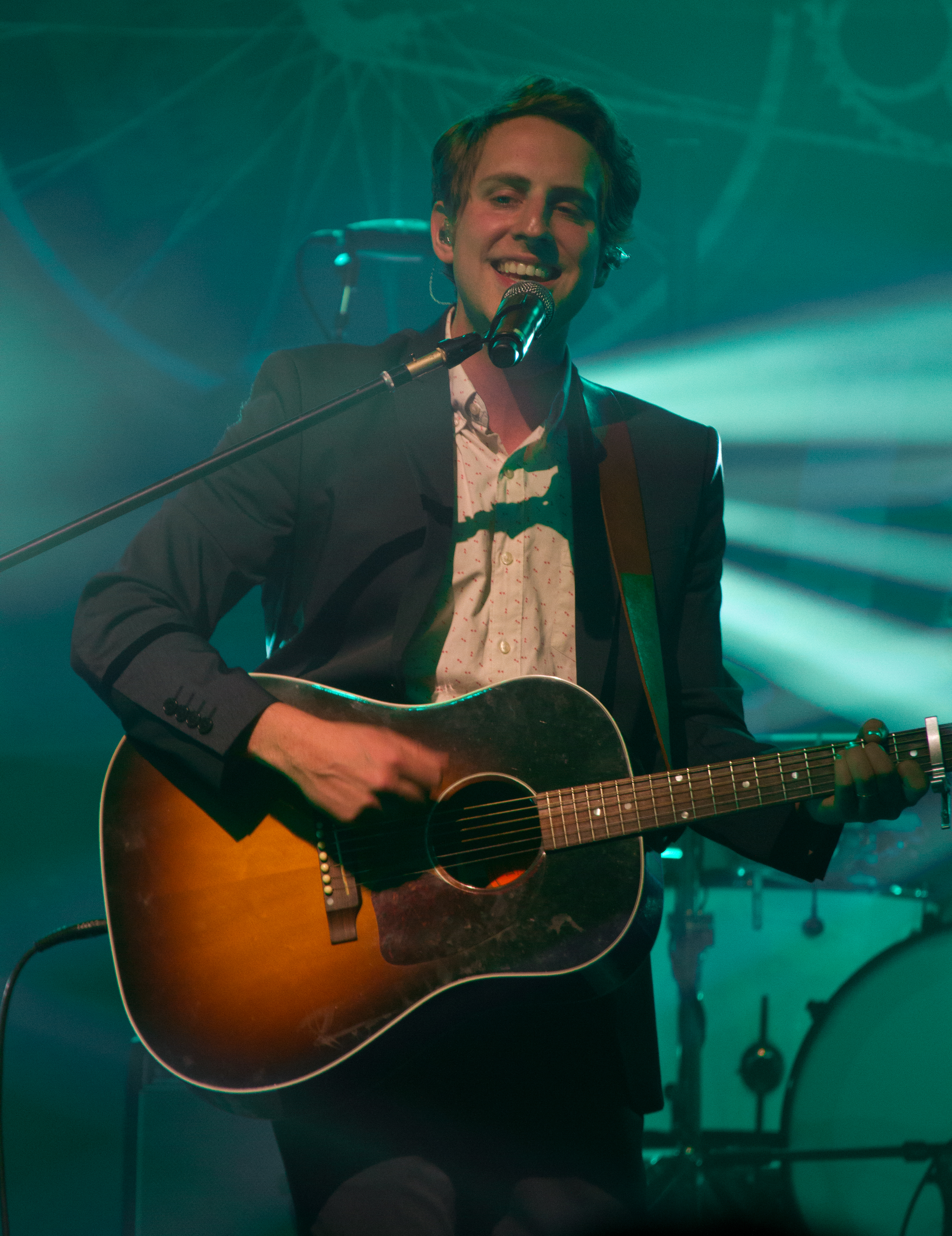
- Studio albums: 8
- EPs: 3
- Live albums: 3
- Compilation albums: 1
- Singles: 16
- Music videos: 17
- As featured artist: 5
- Other appearances: 8

The discography of American singer, songwriter and record producer Ben Rector consists of nine studio albums, four live albums, one compilation album, three extended plays (EP), sixteen singles and various music videos. He has been featured on five songs and has credits on eight others.

== Albums ==
=== Studio albums ===
Title	Album details	Peak chart positions			
Title	Album details	US	US Rock	US Indie	US Folk
Twenty Tomorrow	Released: September 2007; Label: Self-release; Format: CD, digital download	—	—	—	—
Songs That Duke Wrote	Released: December 4, 2008; Label: Aptly Named; Format: CD, digital download	—	—	—	—
Into the Morning	Released: February 16, 2010; Label: Aptly Named; Format: CD, digital download	—	—	39	—
Something Like This	Released: September 13, 2011; Label: Aptly Named; Format: Digital download	41	15	11	—
The Walking in Between	Released: August 20, 2013; Label: Aptly Named / Roar; Format: Digital download	16	5	4	2
Brand New	Released: August 28, 2015; Label: Aptly Named; Format: Digital download	9	2	2	1
Magic	Released: June 22, 2018; Label: OK Kid	44	7	2	1
The Joy of Music	Released: March 11, 2022; Label: OK Kid; Format: Digital download, streaming	189	—	—	—
The Richest Man in the World	Release: May 30, 2025; Label: OK Kid; Format: Digital download, streaming		—	—	—
"—" denotes releases that did not chart.

=== Compilation albums ===
Title	Details
A Ben Rector Christmas	Released: November 13, 2020; Label: OK Kid; Format: Digital download, streaming

=== Live albums ===
Title	Album details	Peak chart positions			
Title	Album details	US	US Rock	US Indie	US Folk
Live in Denver	Released: September 16, 2014; Label: Aptly Named / Roar	139	40	25	3
Magic: Live from the USA	Released: June 21, 2019; Label: OK Kid	—	—	—	—
Live from Atlanta	Released: June 16, 2023; Label: OK Kid	—	—	—	—
Live at The Delta Center	Released: February 20, 2026; Label: OK Kid	—	—	—	—
"—" denotes a release that did not chart.

== Extended plays ==
Title	EP details
Ben Rector	Released: 2006; Label: Self-released; Format: CD, digital download
Jingles and Bells	Released: November 27, 2009; Label: Aptly Named; Format: CD, digital download
Summer Candy	Released: July 27, 2010; Label: Aptly Named; Format: Digital download

== Singles ==
=== As lead artist ===
List of singles as lead artist, with selected chart positions
Title	Year	Peak chart positions	Certifications	Album
Title	Year	US	Certifications	Album
"The Power of Love"	2014	—		"Newy Lewis and the Hues: Greatest Hits" (Note: "Newy Lewis and the Hues: Greatest Hits" is the name of a three-track single.)
"I Want a New Drug"	2014	—		"Newy Lewis and the Hues: Greatest Hits"
"Do You Believe in Love"	2014	—		"Newy Lewis and the Hues: Greatest Hits"
"Brand New"	2016	82	RIAA: Platinum	Brand New
"Kids" (MPLS Version)	2019	—		"MPLS Magic" (MPLS Version) (Note: "MPLS Magic (MPLS Version)" is the name of a three-track single.)
"Drive" (MPLS Version)	2019	—		"MPLS Magic" (MPLS Version)
"Duo" (MPLS Version)	2019	—		"MPLS Magic" (MPLS Version)
"It Would Be You"	2020	—		The Joy of Music
"It Would Be You" (acoustic) (featuring Ingrid Michaelson)	2020	—		Non-album single
"The Thanksgiving Song"	2020	—		A Ben Rector Christmas
"Range Rover" (featuring Steve Winwood)	2021	—		Non-album single
"The Best Is Yet to Come"	2021	—		"The Best Is Yet to Come" (Note: "The Best Is Yet to Come" is the name of a two-track single.)
"The Best Is Yet to Come (A Song for the New Year)"	2021	—		"The Best Is Yet to Come"
"What Makes a Man" (featuring Thomas Rhett)	2022	—		Non-album singles
"Wonderful World"	2022	—		Non-album singles
"Color Up My World" (featuring Hailey Whitters)	2024	—		Non-album singles
"Wreck"	2024	—		Non-album singles

=== As featured artist ===
Title	Year	Album
"A Bear in the Woods" (Josh Lovelace featuring Ben Rector)	2017	Young Folk
"Sailboat" (Cody Fry featuring Ben Rector)	2022	Symphony Sessions
"Back in Time" (Christina Perri featuring Ben Rector)	2022	A Lighter Shade of Blue
"Juggernaut (Sessions)" (John Mark McMillan featuring Ben Rector)	2022	Non-album single
"Ready" (Cory Wong featuring Ben Rector)	2023	The Lucky One
"Joy - Live" (The Choir Room featuring Ben Rector)	2024	Let's Have Church (Live)
"Now That I Found You" (Terri Clark featuring Ben Rector)	2024	Terri Clark: Take Two

== Music videos ==
Title	Year	Album
"Dance With Me Baby"	2010	Into the Morning
"Beautiful"	2014	The Walking in Between
"The Power of Love"	2014	"Newy Lewis and the Hues: Greatest Hits"
"I Want a New Drug"		"Newy Lewis and the Hues: Greatest Hits"
"Do You Believe in Love"		"Newy Lewis and the Hues: Greatest Hits"
"Brand New"	2015	Brand New
"Paris"	2015	Brand New
"Drive"	2018	Magic
"Old Friends"	2018	Magic
"The Thanksgiving Song"	2020	A Ben Rector Christmas
"Range Rover" (featuring Steve Winwood)	2021	Non-album singles
"The Best Is Yet Come"	2021	Non-album singles
"Dream On"	2022	The Joy of Music
"Supernatural" (featuring Dave Koz)	2022	The Joy of Music
"Living My Best Life"	2022	The Joy of Music
"Heroes"	2022	The Joy of Music
"Sunday" (featuring Snoop Dogg)	2022	The Joy of Music
"Wonderful World"	2022	Non-album singles
"Joy (The Choir Room Version)"	2023	Non-album singles
"Color Up My World" (featuring Hailey Whitters)	2024	Non-album singles
"Praying For Me" (featuring Mat Kearney)	2025	Non-album singles

== Other performance and songwriting credits ==
Title	Year	Artist	Album	Notes	Ref.
"Everything Will Be Alright"	2011	Matt Wertz	Weights & Wings	Co-writer, backing vocals	
"Running Back to You"	2011	Matt Wertz	Weights & Wings	Co-writer	
"For the First Time"	2011	Matt Wertz	Weights & Wings	Co-writer	
"She Is"	2014	Lady A	747	Writer	
"Time Machine"	2019	David Hodges	Discrepancies in the Recollection of Various Principles / Side B	Co-writer	
"Takeoff"	2020	Cory Wong	Elevated Music for an Elevated Mood	Electric piano	
"Range Rover"	2020	Devin Dawson	The Pink Slip	Co-writer	
"The Thanksgiving Song"	2021	The Petersens	Live Sessions, Vol. 04	Writer	
"Today"	2023	Marc Scibilia	Mindy	Co-writer	
