= Jordy Searcy =

American singer-songwriter (born 1994)

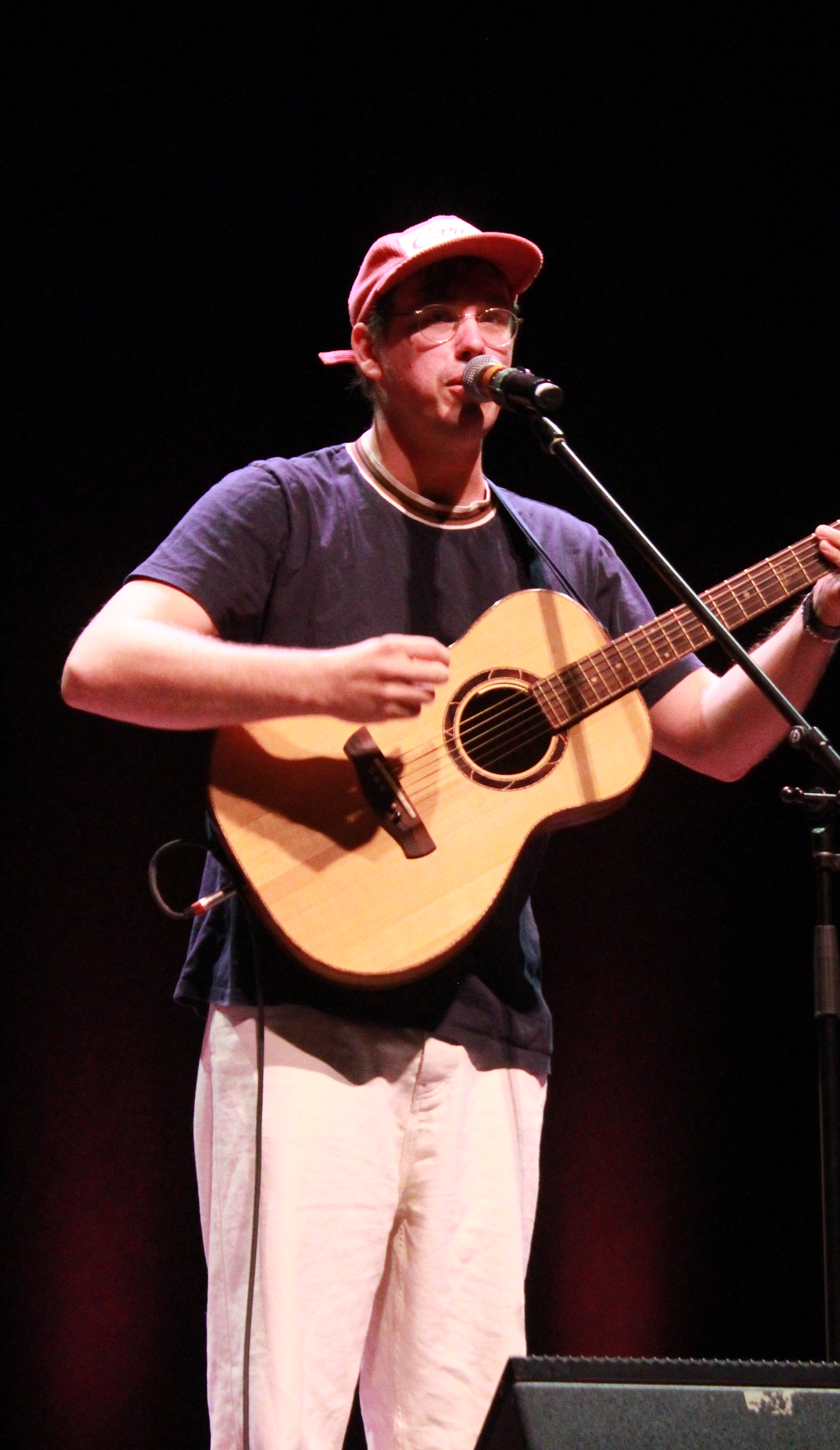
- Searcy in 2024

Background information
- Born: Jordy Searcy; January 15, 1994 (age 32); Baton Rouge, Louisiana
- Genres: Indie pop; folk pop; pop rock
- Occupations: Singer; songwriter; musician
- Instruments: Piano; guitar; vocals
- Years active: 2013–present
- Website: jordysearcymusic.com

Jordy Searcy is an American singer-songwriter based in Oceanside, California. He began pursuing music by age 14 and saw early national success from a competitive run on season 7 of NBC's The Voice while attending college. He has since released three albums—Dark in the City (2018), Love? Songs (2020), and Daylight (2022)—which have seen viral success on social media. By 2022, he had written over 1,000 songs and amassed 51 million song streams. He has performed opening acts for artists such as Mat Kearney and Ben Rector, alongside a persistent touring base of about 150 shows nationwide per year.

== Early life ==
Jordy Searcy was born in Baton Rouge, Louisiana and raised in Alabama. His mother is a vocal teacher, songwriter, artist and worship leader, and his father is a musician, artist, songwriter. He had begun pursuing music at age 14, and first learned the guitar. He would perform cover songs at local bars in his early efforts. He attended the University of North Alabama where he studied for entertainment business. He has cited The Beatles, John Mayer, and Jon Foreman as influences on his works.

== Career ==
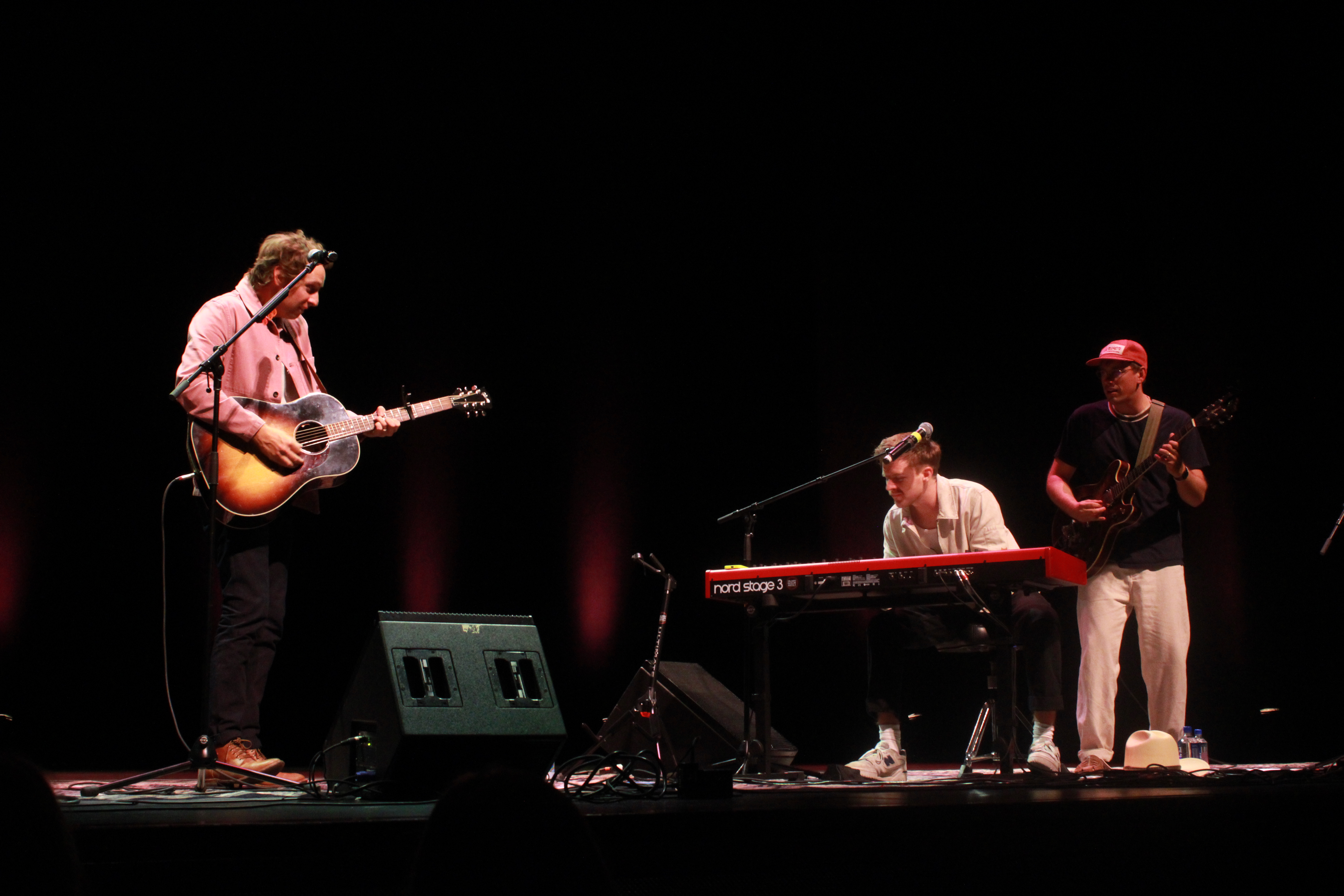
Searcy (right) performing with Ben Rector (left) and Austin Goodloe (center) at The Old Friends Acoustic Tour in 2024

Searcy has released four albums and one extended play and has released 10 singles and has been featured on 3 others. Searcy has a persistent touring foundation, performing about 150 shows nationwide per year and averaging about 12 shows a month. By 2022 he had performed over 700 shows, written over 1,000 songs, and amassed 51 million song streams.

Searcy released his debut self-titled music project in 2013. While still in college in 2014, Searcy received national recognition after a competitive run on season 7 of NBC's The Voice, and took a break from releasing music to do so. Studio executives discovered his talent via content he made on his YouTube channel. On The Voice, he was coached by Pharrell Williams and Alicia Keys, and performed in two episodes as a part of blind auditions and the following battle rounds. His debut performance had an estimated view count of 12.94 million. He relocated to Nashville, Tennessee after his run on the show.

His first full studio-length album, Dark in the City, was released on February 15, 2018, followed by Love? Songs on April 14, 2020. During the COVID-19 pandemic throughout 2020, Searcy frequently performed live on Instagram and donated his earnings to smaller musicians who were affected by a lack of touring amid lockdown enforcements. During lockdown he wrote "It Would Be You" with singer/songwriter Ben Rector.

In 2021 he toured with over 40 shows in his US Fall Tour. In 2022, Searcy's song "Love and War in Your Twenties" from Dark in the City went viral on the social media platform TikTok. His lead single "Molly" from his forthcoming album Daylight also saw 100,000 streams on TikTok that year. Daylight released on June 24, 2022. He opened for Mat Kearney on his first leg of The January Flower Tour in early 2022.

2022 and 2023 saw multiple collaborations between Searcy and Rector. Throughout May and June 2022, Searcy toured as an opening act for Rector's The Joy of Music Tour, in association with the album of the same name. The following year he performed as an opening act for The Old Friends Acoustic Tour in its 2023 revival alongside Stephen Day. Searcy's touring for The Joy of Music Tour and The Old Friends Acoustic Tour spanned 49 dates. He also co-wrote Rector's song "Wonderful World", which released September 23, 2022. Searcy performed 23 shows with the US Fall Tour throughout September and October 2024. Searcy wrote and featured in an original song, "Colors", for the film Harold and the Purple Crayon.

== Personal life ==
Searcy is a Christian, and some of his works discuss feelings relating to religion, such as "Explaining Jesus". He and his wife, YouTuber Michel Janse, met in 2022, and various works of his are influenced by their relationship, such as "End of Us". His album Dark in the City includes commentary on racism in the Christian church and American culture. He played the album when he opened for Lee Brice at the 2016 Republican National Convention. However, he jokes about this event in retrospect in his song "Favorite Days"; "we try not to talk about that".

== Discography ==
=== Studio albums ===
Title	Album details
Jordy Searcy	Released: 2013; Label: Self-released; Format: Digital download
Dark in the City	Released: February 15, 2018; Label: Self-released; Format: Digital download
Love? Songs	Released: April 14, 2020; Label: Self-released; Format: Digital download
Daylight	Released: June 24, 2022; Label: Self-released; Format: Digital download
Mt. Tam	Released: January, 30, 2026; Label: Self-released; Format: Digital download

=== Extended plays ===
Title	EP details
Seasons	Released: 2015; Label: Self-released; Format: CD, digital download

=== Singles ===
==== As lead artist ====
Title	Year	Album
"Skinny Love (The Voice Performance)"	2015	Non-album single
"Only Know How to Love You" (featuring Annika Bennett)	2020	Non-album single
"Christmas Magic"	2020	Non-album single
"Daylight (Stripped)"	2022	Non-album single
"The End of Us"	2023	Non-album single
"Getaway Car"	2024	Non-album single
"All Nighter"	2024	Non-album single

==== As co-artist ====
Title	Year	Album
"Breakeven (The Voice Performance)" (with Taylor Phelan)	2015	Non-album single
"There's Nothing Holdin' Me Back" (with Haley Klinkhammer)	2017	Non-album single
"Just Like Autumn" (with The Tuesday Crew and Carly Bannister)	2018	Non-album single

==== As featured artist ====
Title	Year	Album
"Range Rover (A Capella)"	2023	Live from Atlanta
"Make Room"	2023	Make Room
"Colors" (From Harold and the Purple Crayon	2024	Non-album single

=== Other performance and songwriting credits ===
Title	Year	Artist	Album	Notes	Ref.
"New Today"	2020	Micah Tyler	New Today	Composer, Guitar	
"Naive"	2020	Preslea Elliott	Non-album single	Acoustic guitar, Electric guitar	
"Guess I'm Grown Now"	2020	Stephen Day	Guess I'm Grown Now	Composer	
"Wonderful World"	2022	Ben Rector	Non-album single	Composer	
