= The Joy of Music (album) =

Studio album by Ben Rector
- Released: March 11, 2022
- Recorded: 2020
- Length: 49:36
- Label: OK Kid
- Producer: Ben Rector; John Fields

Ben Rector chronology
A Ben Rector Christmas (2020)	The Joy of Music (2022)	The Richest Man in the World (2025)

The Joy of Music is the eighth studio album by American singer-songwriter Ben Rector, released on March 11, 2022, through OK Kid Recordings. Rector co-produced the album with John Fields. The first draft of music was recorded in January 2020, but most of the album was scrapped and recorded throughout the COVID-19 pandemic and completed in December 2020. The pandemic cancelled his ongoing tour at the time and withheld other deadlines, leaving Rector to focus exclusively on the album's creation.

The album was designed to evoke joy in the listener; Rector also constructed the album around this philosophy, by writing music and collaborating with artists he would enjoy, and explore new ideas out of his comfort zone. He performed on various TV shows to promote the album and also issued a short film in December 2021 in the lead-up to its release. The Joy of Music was positively received by critics, who praised it for its diversity and lyrics. The album peaked at number 189 on the US Billboard 200, and appeared on multiple other Billboard charts.

== Background ==
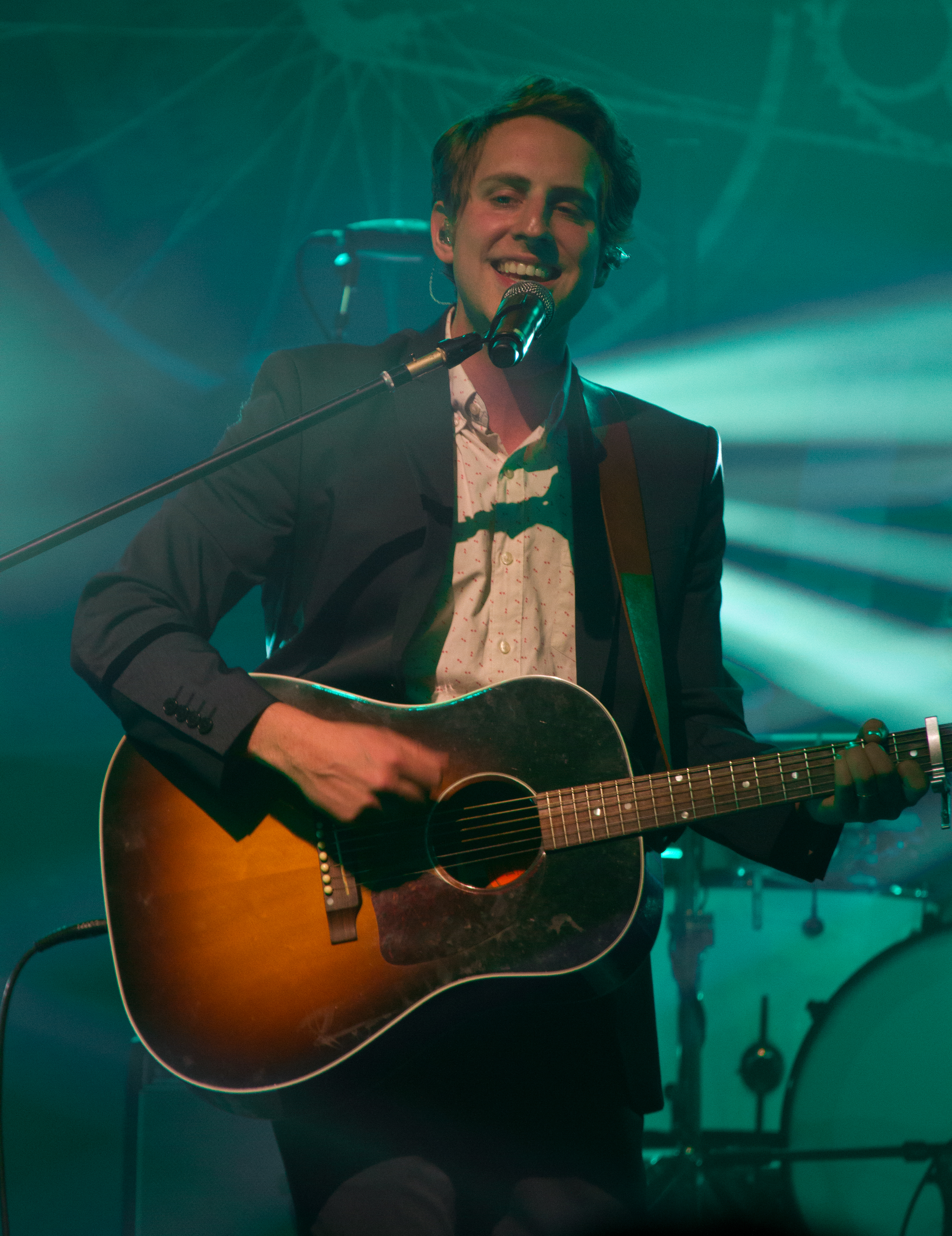
Ben Rector performing live in 2016

After Rector released his seventh album Magic (2018), his success grew, and his career as an independent artist shifted to business and management. With this change, Rector realized that making music was not as exciting to him as it was in his college years.

In January 2020 and preceding the COVID-19 pandemic, Rector had recorded most of the album in Los Angeles with a collection of musicians he referred to as his "dream band". When COVID-19 began affecting the United States and the country began enforcing lockdowns, the album was put on hold. At the time he was touring following Magic with The Old Friends Acoustic Tour, which was cut short in early 2020. Rector personally returned to The Joy of Music after a few months and began rewriting many of the songs from scratch. Only two of the songs on the album made it to the final product, with the other eleven being written during the pandemic. The circumstances led Rector to feel free to fully focus on the creative process of the music, since the pandemic led to a lack of deadlines and other responsibilities to deal with, such as touring. Rector found that the experience helped him rediscover what he enjoyed about music in the first place, and looked on the project as more of a hobby than his job. He considered The Joy of Music to be his best work at the time.

The second recording of the album was completed in December 2020. Rector referred to the experience from after recording to completion as a "strangely familiar and new at the same time", since most of his work usually involved long-distance work with others regardless. With the extra time on his hands he was able to write a Christmas album, A Ben Rector Christmas, which released in late November 2020. The complexity and challenging year prompted him to write "The Best is Yet to Come", a song about reflecting on the current year and going into the next one, on New Year's Eve 2020. The song released in December the following year.

== Production ==
I have high expectations for my work. I don't have super high expectations for what's going to happen. You just can't control everything. But for the first time, maybe in my career, I really am excited about the new record. I think it's really good, and I'm pumped to get it out in the world.

It feels like I'm finally wearing an outfit that I'm very comfortable in. It feels accessible and fun. I hope there's some lyrical and emotional depth, but I really do feel the best about this record of anything I've ever worked on."

— Ben Rector, 2021, American Songwriter interview

The goal of the album was not to evoke any emotion or instruction for the listener, but rather to simply feel joy listening to it. This goal also played a part in his creative process; various parts of the music, such as the construction and the artists featured on it, stemmed from doing what Rector thought would be enjoyable. The Joy of Music was his first album that Rector did not "play safe", so he did not know whether or not the album would be successful. Noting that songs mainly focus on a specific portion of a person's life, Rector wanted the lyrics to reflect on an entire lifespan.

"It Would Be You" was released separately from the album in September 2020. According to Rector, it was "inspired, written and recorded in quarantine". The day after arriving home from the cancelled Old Friends Acoustic Tour, he conceived and wrote the song with musician and friend Jordy Searcy while they were both quarantined in their homes, sending voice memos to communicate. The song's success led to the #CoffeeDadShuffle trend on social media, and the videos were compiled into a music video. An acoustic version featuring Ingrid Michaelson was released in October 2020, since Rector felt the song worked better as a duet. Another song, "Range Rover", written by Rector, Mark Trussell and Devin Dawson, was completed prior to being quarantined but revisited during the pandemic, and included Steve Winwood on the Hammond organ. Rector felt the song was too out of his character and if it was on the track list of The Joy of Music it was "going to stick out and not really belong" and opted to release it as a single instead. Dawson released the original version of the song and Rector released his version separately as a single in May 2021.

After facing an ankle injury in 2021 he rested outside and watched the 2021 Masters Tournament, and shortly taking a break to watch a video from the golf Instagram account No Laying Up. The background track of the video by Musicbed inspired the instrumental for the song "Sunday". "Sunday" features vocals from Snoop Dogg; a fan of Snoop Dogg since he was a child, Rector wanted to have his vocals featured on one of his songs, and wanted Snoop Dogg to rap on the song although he anticipated it not actually happening. Rector's team reached out to Snoop Dogg's manager, who said he will only accept to be on the song if he liked it, which he ultimately did. Both sides had one condition each: Rector said the lyrics needed to be clean to match his audience scope, and Snoop Dogg's manager said he only gets one take with no redos. The original revision from Snoop Dogg included a reference to cannabis, and although Rector feared he could not alter it, the management team agreed he can cover over the reference with his own vocals to keep the song family-friendly.

The goal of the opening song "Dream On" was to sound like a kid's song for adults. "Daughter" features a cameo of his then 2 year old daughter, Jane. While recording a memo of the song while practicing she requested to hear it again, and the dialogue between the two appeared in the final product. When the song was completed Jane would continually request that he play "the Janie song" [sic] in the car. The goal of the song was to be an "anthem" for parents with young children, but also to capture "dad vibes" that he was personally feeling at the time of writing.

Along with Snoop Dogg, The Joy of Music features vocals from the One Voice Children's Choir and Taylor Goldsmith, and instrumental performances from saxophonists Dave Koz and Kenny G. The character "Joy", a costumed character, was created in collaboration with the Jim Henson's Creature Shop. The character was used for promotional material, the associated short film, and touring for the album. Rector conceived the character because he thought it would be enjoyable to have a mascot for his album, something he hasn't seen been used for music. He also appreciated how the character took some focus off of him on stage.

== Promotion and release ==
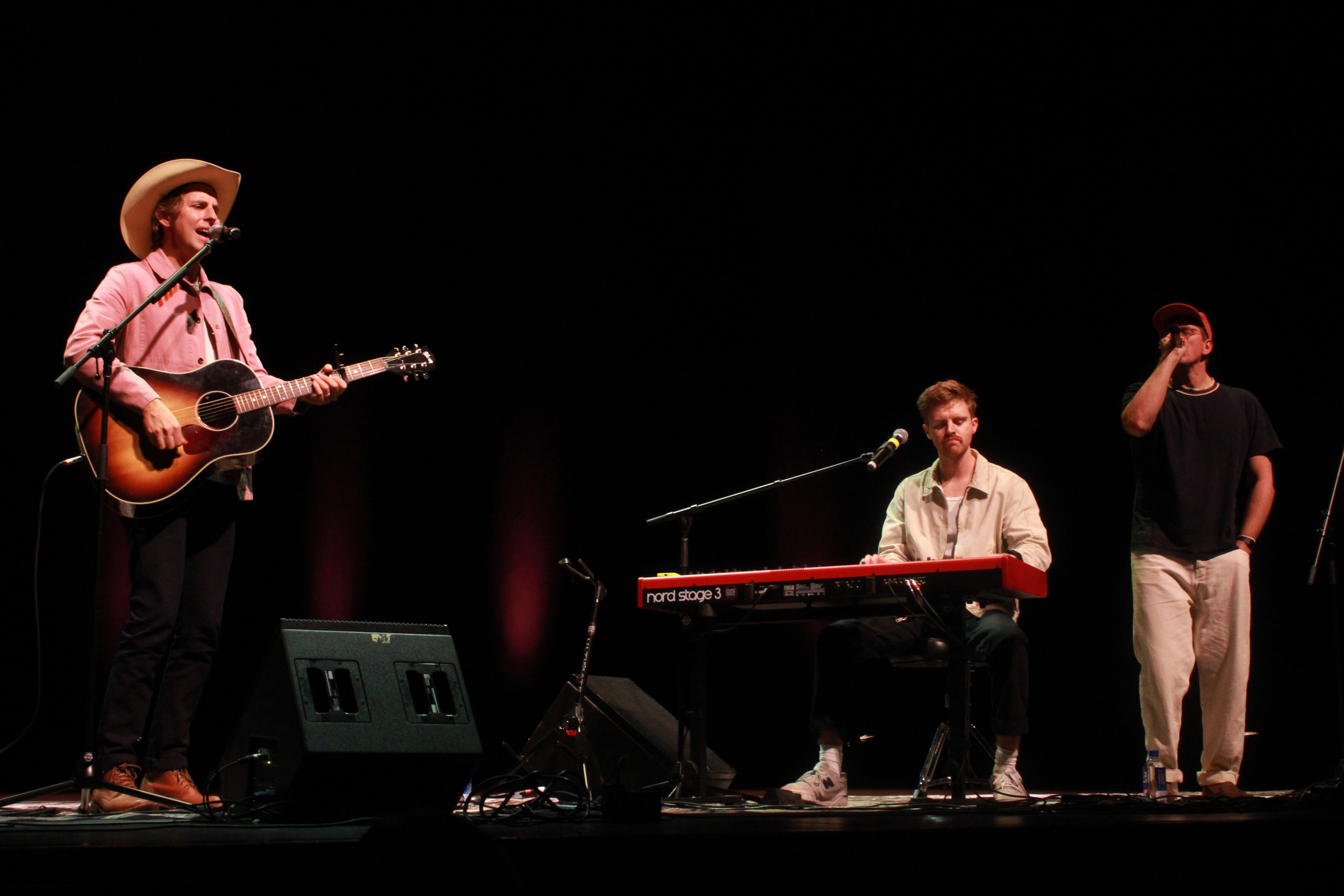
Rector (left) performing "Sunday" alongside Austin Goodloe (center) and Jordy Searcy (right) at The Old Friends Acoustic Tour in 2024

When the album was completed he still wanted to continue doing collaborations he found exciting, working with Thomas Rhett on the song "What Makes a Man", which released in August 2022. On January 7, 2022 Rector released three songs from the album as previews: "Dream On", "Supernatural", and "Living My Best Life". Leading up to the album he also teased portions of some of the songs on social media and explained the personal message behind them. Rector performed a stripped version of "Living My Best Life" on Live with Kelly and Ryan a week before the album's release. The Joy of Music was released on March 11, 2022. In April, he performed "Steady Love" on The Bobby Bones Show, which he stated was his favorite song on the album. A promotional live tour was held from May 5 to June 25, 2022, featuring songs from the album alongside popular hits. He was accompanied by JP Saxe, Jake Scott, Jordy Searcy, and Stephen Day.

Alongside the release of the album was a short film under the same name that features some songs from the album. The story follows Rector who is struggling to write music and mentally, weighed down by his business duties. He is then transported into a dream-like world by Joy and learns to rediscover his passion of creating music. Rector detailed the meaning of the music video for "Steady Love" to People magazine: the video depicts Rector among other puppets that depict different ages, the youngest of which a large paper mache figure that progressively get smaller in size. He used this imagery to depict how one views themself with less importance as they grow older, and how "you take up a little less space in your world and people and things you love take up more." The film had a physical premiere in December 2021 at the Franklin Theatre in Nashville, Tennessee, and a Q&A was held afterwards. Rector arrived early to personally greet fans and give out candy. Despite Rector's assumptions that the premiere would not sell, the event was sold out, and two more screenings were held because of its success. Rector cited the short film as out of his comfort zone but an enjoyable experience regardless.

== Critical reception ==
Critics called The Joy of Music Rector's most musically diverse album to date. Dominic Bonocore of Talon News praised the unique blend of genres, noting the cross of Rector's traditional pop style with the inclusion of a gospel choir in "Living My Best Life", and a blend of pop and jazz in "Supernatural". Yahoo! News's Curtis Wong considered "Supernatural" to be the "grooviest entry" with its use of 1980's synth pop and Koz's juxtaposing saxophone performance. Wong closed with saying that "there’s no question 'The Joy of Music' represents a major step up for Rector as a musician." Lee Zimmerman of American Songwriter called the album an "unabashed musical celebration". Zimmerman noted the album's potential mass appeal with its list of collaborators.

Critics also praised the album's inspirational and relatable lyrics. Wong appreciated the personal lyrics discussing time and fatherhood, and his willingness to explore new boundaries. He also positively received Rector's "mischievous wit", especially within "Sunday". Matt Collar of AllMusic lauded Rector's ability to transform negative emotions, such as worry, into positive anthems, especially in "Dream On". Bonocore also expressed similar praise of "Dream On"'s inspiring tone. Zimmerman praised the variety of emotions expressed in the songs, such as the "infectious enthusiasm" found in "We Will Never Be This Young Again" and "Joy", the sentimental feelings associated in "Dream On" and "Steady Love", and "Heroes" and "Thank You" for their biblical association.

== Commercial performance ==
The Joy of Music appeared on many Billboard charts. The album debuted and peaked at 189 on the Billboard 200 charts, and 17 in Top Album Sales in March 26, 2022. That same week, "Sunday" debuted at 41 on the Billboard Hot Christian Songs chart. "Thank You" debuted on the Billboard Christian Airplay chart on April 23, 2022, and remained on the chart for 19 weeks, peaking at 33 on May 28, 2022. The song also debuted on the Billboard Christian AC Airplay chart on June 4, 2022, remaining on the chart for 3 weeks and peaking at 27 on its debut week. As an independent artist, the album debuted at 30 on the Billboard Independent Albums chart. The vinyl version debuted at 21 on March 26, 2022.

"Sunday" was used as an anthem by ESPN for the first half of the 2022 season of Sunday Night Baseball, alongside other songs from The Joy of Music. Executive Vice President of marketing for ESPN Laura Gentile said that "Sunday" "captures the joy that baseball brings, and the great feelings fans and players share as the season begins". Rector called the usage of the song "a cool surprise" and was impressed with the advertisement draft they presented to him. Despite ESPN setting up a pitch meeting for Rector, he told them at the beginning he did not need convincing.

== Track listing ==
The Joy of Music track listing
No.	Title	Length
1.	"Dream On"	2:43
2.	"Supernatural" (featuring Dave Koz)	4:27
3.	"Living My Best Life"	3:35
4.	"Steady Love"	3:44
5.	"Heroes"	4:31
6.	"Sunday" (featuring Snoop Dogg)	3:22
7.	"Thank You"	3:59
8.	"Daughter"	3:44
9.	"Hanging Out" (featuring Kenny G)	3:53
10.	"We Will Never Be This Young Again"	3:34
11.	"It Would Be You"	3:39
12.	"Cliches" (featuring Taylor Goldsmith)	3:42
13.	"Joy"	4:43
Total length:		49:36

== Charts ==
Chart performance for The Joy of Music
Chart (2022)	Peak position
US Billboard 200	189
US Independent Albums (Billboard)	30

== See also ==
- Impact of the COVID-19 pandemic on the music industry
- Impact of the COVID-19 pandemic on the arts and cultural heritage
