= The Old Friends Acoustic Tour =

Concert tour by Ben Rector

- Tour by Ben Rector
- 2023 poster
- Location: United States
- Start date: February 27, 2020
- End date: December 1, 2023
- Legs: 3
- No. of shows: 33

Ben Rector concert chronology
- The Joy of Music Live; The Old Friends Acoustic Tour

The Old Friends Acoustic Tour is a 2020, 2023, and 2024 concert tour from American singer-songwriter Ben Rector. The original tour, featuring Cody Fry, was slated to perform throughout the first half of 2020, but enforced lockdowns amidst the growing COVID-19 pandemic in the United States saw the tour cancelled after 4 performances, compromising 12 concerts. The tour was later revived in 2023 featuring Jordy Searcy and Stephen Day, performing an additional 27 concerts. Two additional dates were performed in October 2024. The concert is named after Rector's single "Old Friends".

Having missed his acoustic performances from his college years, Rector headlined the Old Friends Acoustic Tour to perform laid-back, stripped versions of his music. The concert would feature music mainly from his two albums prior, Magic and Brand New. Following enforced national lockdowns and the cancellation of the tour, he would find the open schedule relieving and would rework his upcoming album The Joy of Music in the meantime, among other releases. Some of his new music he released since 2020 would be featured in the 2023 revival.

== Background ==
2020 poster

When Ben Rector was in college, he would tour with just an acoustic guitar, an experience he missed. Rector announced the tour in November 2019; the tour was designed to perform stripped versions of his songs, mainly those from 2018's Magic and 2015's Brand New, with a more relaxed atmosphere. The tour featured Cody Fry. In January 2020 he recorded the songs for his upcoming album following Magic, and began touring for the concert the following late February. At the same time, the COVID-19 pandemic began spreading in the United States, and national lockdowns started to take effect, enforcing stay-at-home orders. Most entertainment fields were impacted around the same time. Rector had just flown to Dallas, Texas to perform at the Majestic Theatre that night, but was forced to return home in Nashville, Tennessee. Attempts to postpone dates failed, and he ultimately cancelled the tour in August 2020. The following September, he held a pay-per-view livestream of the concert.

Although he was disappointed about the tour being cancelled he found the lack of a schedule to be liberating for him creatively. The day after flying home he immediately wrote "It Would Be You" via voice memos during quarantine with record producer John Fields. With the free time, he would re-write and re-record most his next album from scratch, as well as release A Ben Rector Christmas among other singles. Meanwhile, Fry returned to production work; shortly afterward his song "I Hear a Symphony" from the 2017 album Flying became a viral hit on the social media platform TikTok, helping advance his career.

The tour was revived in 2023, with musicians Jordy Searcy Stephen Day, and Austin Goodloe. The new tour received a new set, updated to include songs from The Joy of Music and Rector's single "Range Rover". He cites The Old Friends Acoustic Tour as his favorite tour to perform.

== Setlist ==
=== 2020 tour ===
The following setlist was obtained from the concert held on February 28, 2020, at The Magnolia in El Cajon, California. It does not represent all concerts for the duration of the tour.

1. "You've Got a Friend in Me"
  (Randy Newman cover)
2. "Crazy"
3. "Never Gonna Let You Go" / "My Girl"
  (The Temptations cover)
4. "When a Heart Breaks"
5. "Let the Good Times Roll"
6. "When I'm With You"
7. "Loving You is Easy"
8. "Note to Self"
9. "Paris"
10. "The Men That Drive Me Places"
11. "Duo"
12. "Old Friends"
13. "Brand New"
14. "Sailboat"

=== 2023 tour ===
The following setlist was obtained from the concert held on March 29, 2023, at the Ryman Auditorium in Nashville, Tennessee. It does not represent all concerts for the duration of the tour.

1. "When I'm With You"
2. "Sunday"
3. "Living My Best Life"
4. "When a Heart Breaks"
5. "Forever Like That"
6. "Let the Good Times Roll"
7. "It's a Great Day to Be Alive"
  (Darrell Scott cover)
8. "30,000 Feet"
9. "Old Friends" / "Forever Young"
  (Alphaville cover)
10. "Love Like This"
11. "The Men That Drive Me Places"
12. "Kiss the Girl" / "Under the Sea" / "Part of Your World"
  (Alan Menken and Howard Ashman cover)
13. "Brand New"
14. "Range Rover"

== Tour dates ==
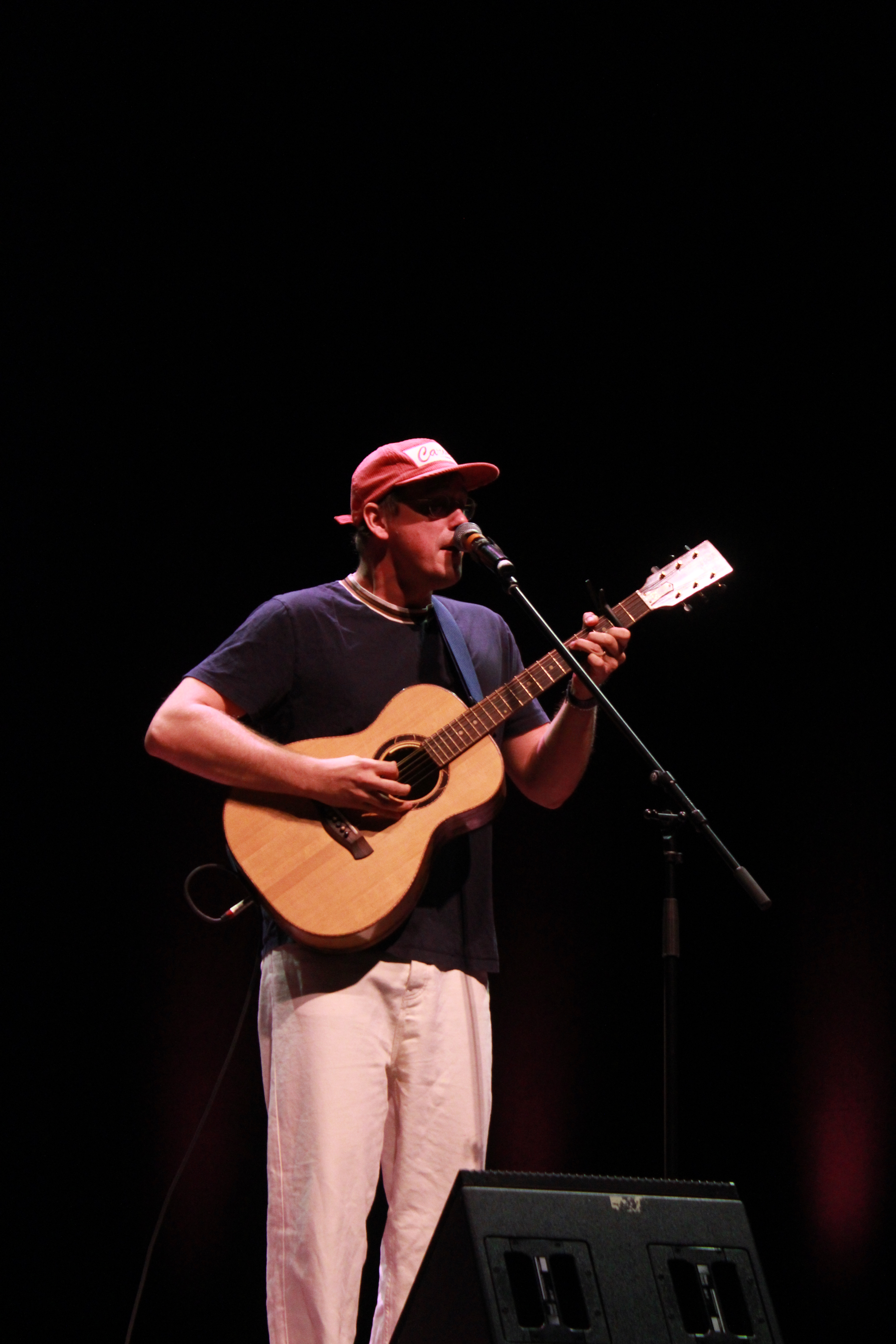
Opening act Jordy Searcy performing at the tour, 2024

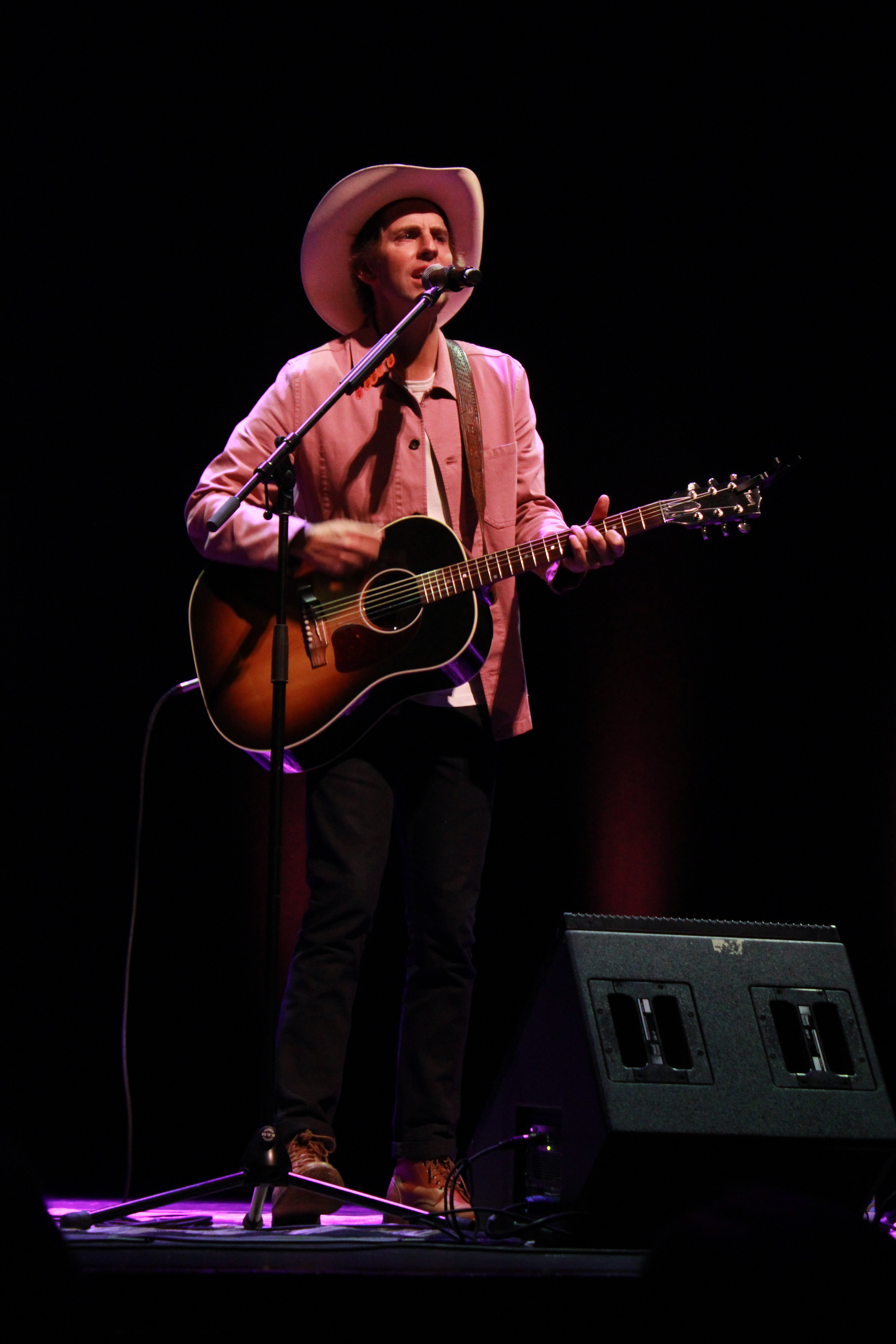
Ben Rector performing at the tour, 2024

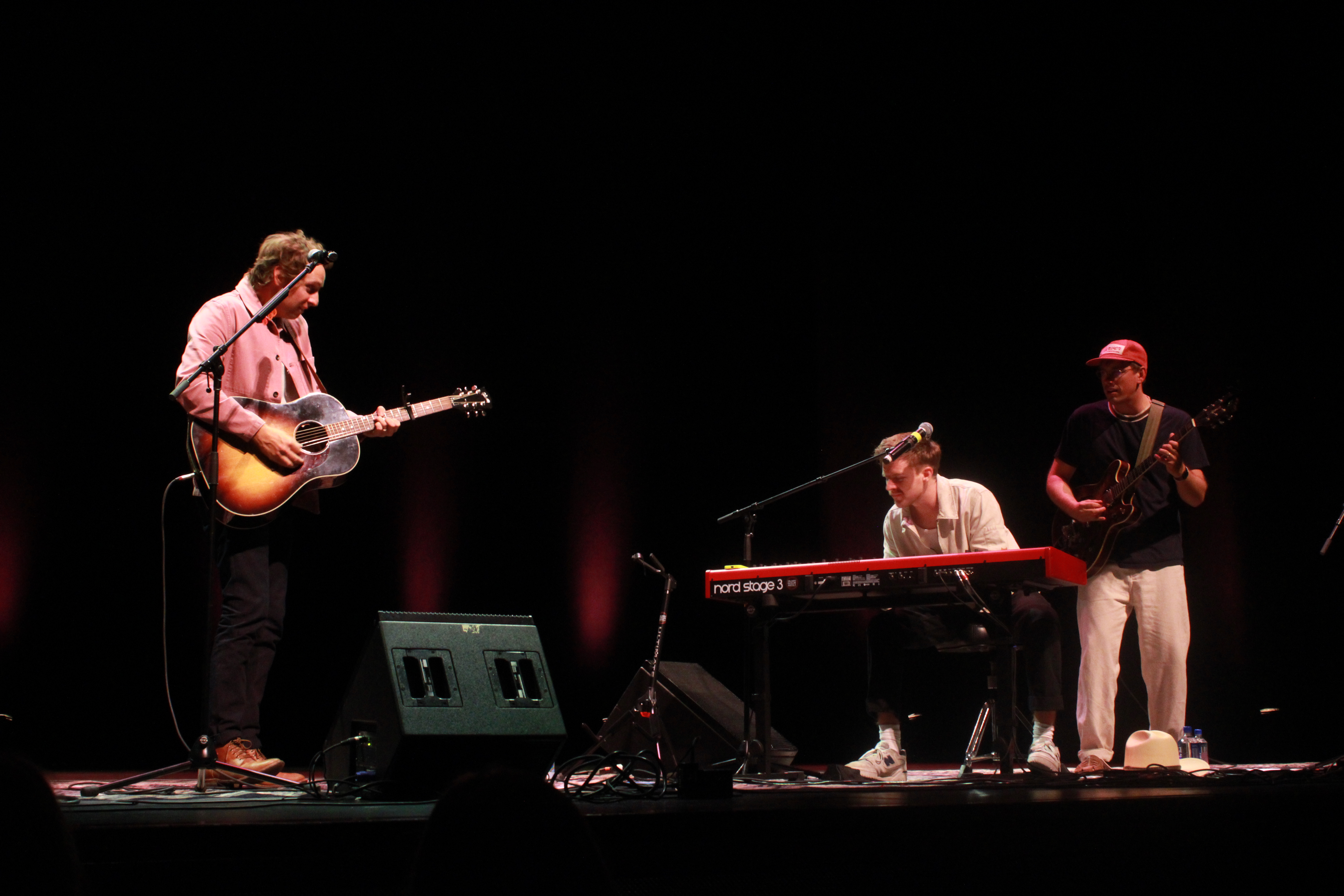
Ben Rector (left) performing with Austin Goodloe (center) and Jordy Searcy, 2024

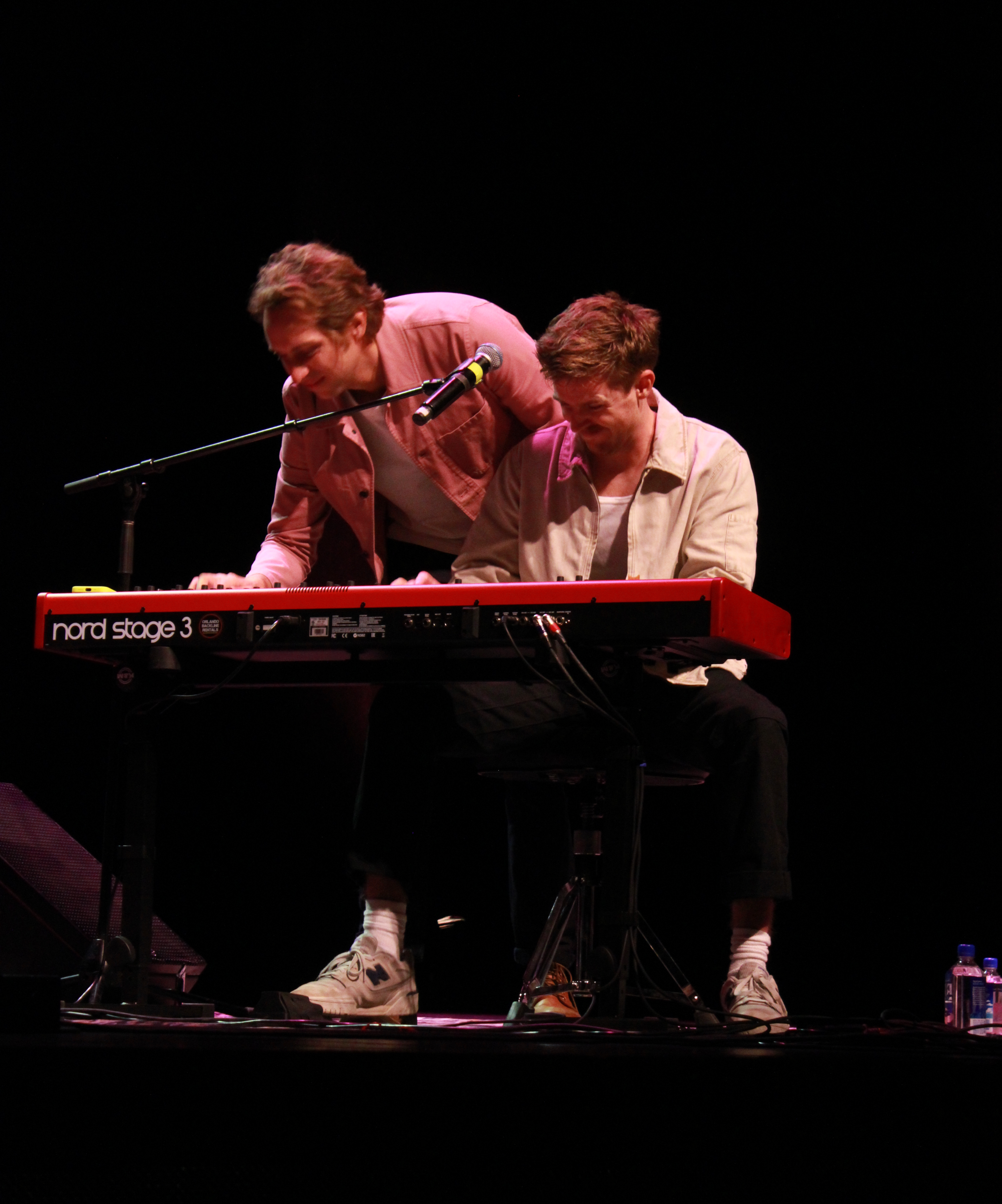
Ben Rector (left) with Austin Goodloe (right), 2024

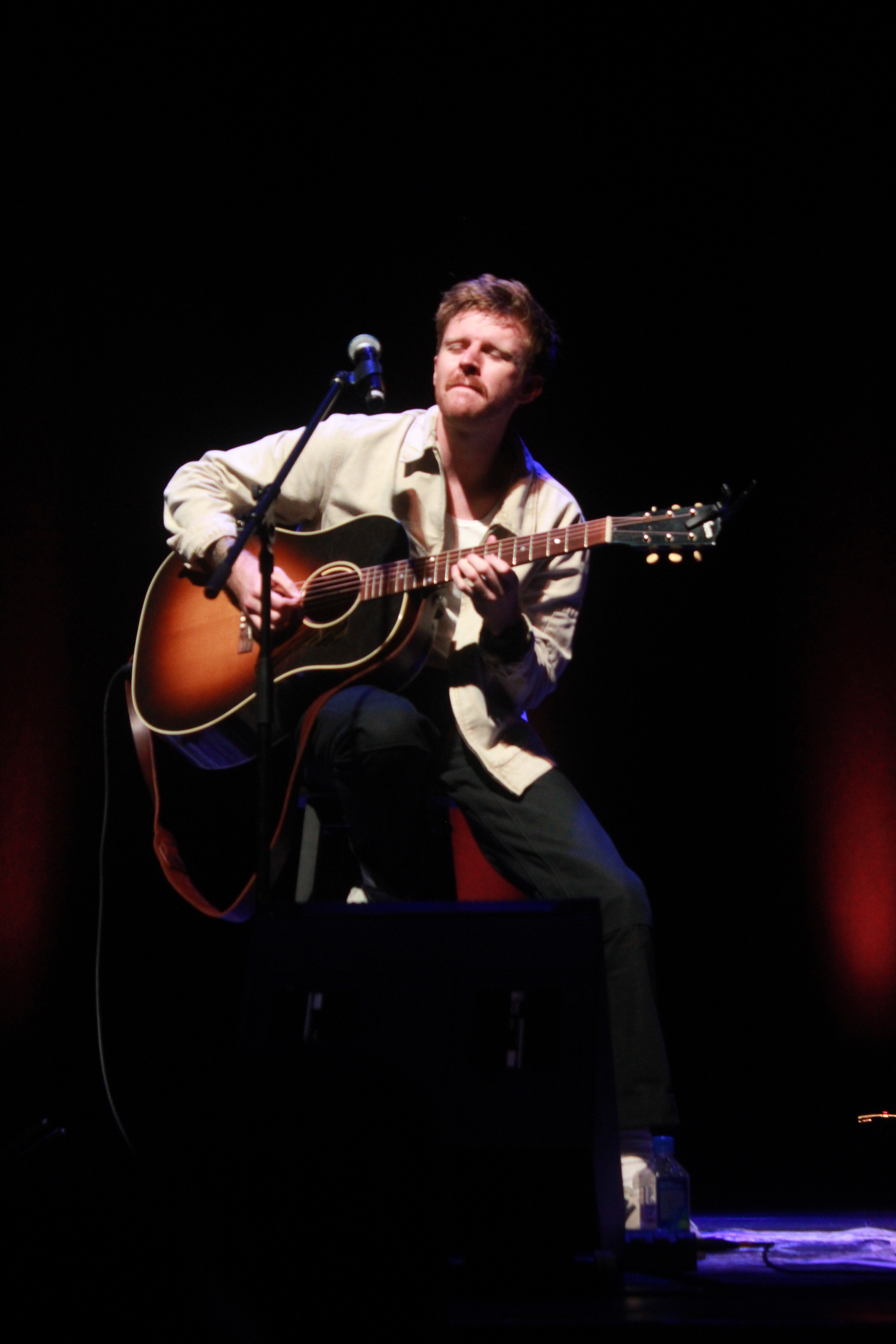
Austin Goodloe performing at the tour, 2024

=== 2020 tour ===
==== Dates performed ====
Date	City	Venue
North America
February 27, 2020	Riverside, California	Fox Performing Arts Center
February 28, 2020	El Cajon, California	The Magnolia
March 6, 2020	Denver, Colorado	Paramount Theatre
March 7, 2020	Rexburg, Idaho	BYU-Idaho's Center Stage

==== Dates cancelled ====
Date	City	Venue	Reason
North America
March 13, 2020	Dallas, Texas	Majestic Theatre	COVID-19 pandemic
March 18, 2020	Nashville, Tennessee	Ryman Auditorium	COVID-19 pandemic
March 20, 2020	Little Rock, Arkansas	Robinson Center Stage	COVID-19 pandemic
March 27, 2020	Minneapolis, Minnesota	State Theatre	COVID-19 pandemic
March 28, 2020	Chicago, Illinois	Athenaeum Theatre	COVID-19 pandemic
April 4, 2020	Boston, Massachusetts	Boch Center	COVID-19 pandemic
April 9, 2020	Charlotte, North Carolina	North Carolina Blumenthal Performing Arts Center	COVID-19 pandemic
April 10, 2020	Atlanta, Georgia	Atlanta Symphony Hall	COVID-19 pandemic
April 17, 2020	Greenville, North Carolina	Peace Center	COVID-19 pandemic
April 18, 2020	Birmingham, Alabama	Alabama Theatre	COVID-19 pandemic
April 23, 2020	College Station, Texas	Rudder Auditorium	COVID-19 pandemic
May 1, 2020	Grand Rapids, Michigan	Fountain Street Church	COVID-19 pandemic

=== 2023 tour ===
Date	City	Venue
North America
March 9, 2023	Seattle, Washington	Moore Theatre
March 10, 2023	Portland, Oregon	Keller Auditorium
March 16, 2023	San Antonio, Texas	Majestic Theatre
March 17, 2023	Fort Worth, Texas	Will Rogers Memorial Center
March 24, 2023	Grand Rapids, Michigan	GLC Live at 20 Monroe
March 25, 2023	Milwaukee, Wisconsin	Riverside Theater
March 29, 2023	Nashville, Tennessee	Ryman Auditorium
April 14, 2023	Athens, Georgia	Classic Center
April 15, 2023	Greenville, South Carolina	Peace Center Concert Hall
April 21, 2023	Durham, North Carolina	Durham Performing Arts Center
April 27, 2023	Little Rock, Arkansas	Robinson Center
April 28, 2023	Tulsa, Oklahoma	Tulsa Theater
May 5, 2023	Wichita, Kansas	Cotillion Ballroom
May 6, 2023	Denver, Colorado	Paramount Theatre
October 7, 2023	Sandy, Utah	Sandy Amphitheater
October 13, 2023	Saratoga, California	Mountain Winery Amphitheater
October 14, 2023	San Diego, California	Humphreys Concerts by the Bay
October 19, 2023	Chesterfield, Missouri	The Factory Theatre
October 20, 2023	Kansas City, Missouri	Midland Theatre
November 3, 2023	Cincinnati, Ohio	Aronoff Center
November 4, 2023	Detroit, Michigan	Fox Theatre
November 9, 2023	Louisville, Kentucky	The Kentucky Center
November 10, 2023	Knoxville, Tennessee	Tennessee Theatre
November 17, 2023	Orlando, Florida	Dr. Phillips Center for the Performing Arts
November 18, 2023	Clearwater, Florida	Ruth Eckerd Hall
November 30, 2023	Austin, Texas	The Moody Theater
December 1, 2023	Oklahoma City, Oklahoma	The Criterion

=== 2024 tour ===
Date	City	Venue
North America
October 11, 2024	Waco, Texas	Magnolia Silos
October 12, 2024	Orlando, Florida	Dr. Phillips Center for the Performing Arts

== See also ==
- Impact of the COVID-19 pandemic on the music industry
- Impact of the COVID-19 pandemic on the arts and cultural heritage
- The Biggest Tour I Have Done So Far Tour
