= All on Me =

Single by Devin Dawson

from the album Dark Horse
- Released: April 3, 2017
- Genre: Country
- Length: 3:47
- Label: Warner Bros. Nashville
- Songwriters: Devin Dawson; Jacob Durrett; Austin Smith
- Producer: Jay Joyce

Devin Dawson singles chronology
"All on Me" (2017)	"Asking for a Friend" (2018)

"All on Me" is a song co-written and recorded by American country music singer Devin Dawson. It is his debut single and appears on his first album, Dark Horse. Dawson wrote the song with his twin brother Jacob Durrett and Austin Smith, and Jay Joyce produced it.

== Critical reception ==
Billy Dukes of the blog Taste of Country reviewed the song favorably, stating that "There's nothing demanding about the mid-tempo love song, which is why it's endearing."

== Commercial performance ==
The song peaked at No. 2 on Billboard's Country Airplay chart on March 31, 2018. It has sold 223,000 copies in the United States since April 2018.

== Music video ==
The song's music video premiered in July 2017. It was filmed at the abandoned Tennessee State Prison. Justin Clough directed the video.

== Charts ==
=== Weekly charts ===
Chart (2017–2018)	Peak position
Canada Hot 100 (Billboard)	75
US Billboard Hot 100	52
US Country Airplay (Billboard)	2
US Hot Country Songs (Billboard)	6

=== Year-end charts ===
Chart (2017)	Position
US Hot Country Songs (Billboard)	72

Chart (2018)	Position
US Country Airplay (Billboard)	31
US Hot Country Songs (Billboard)	29

== Certifications ==
Region	Certification	Certified units/sales
Canada (Music Canada)	Platinum	80,000^{‡}
United States (RIAA)	2× Platinum	2,000,000^{‡}
^{‡} Sales+streaming figures based on certification alone.
