= A Ben Rector Christmas =

Studio album by Ben Rector
- Released: November 13, 2020
- Recorded: 2020
- Length: 19:32
- Label: OK Kid
- Producer: Ben Rector

Ben Rector chronology
Magic (2018)	A Ben Rector Christmas (2020)	The Joy of Music (2022)

A Ben Rector Christmas is a compilation studio album by American singer-songwriter Ben Rector, released on November 13, 2020, through OK Kid Recordings. It is a collection of popular Christmas songs, including "The Thanksgiving Song", an original piece based on the holiday of the same name; "The Thanksgiving Song" released October 27, 2020, and the album followed on November 13, 2020. Due to lockdowns amidst the COVID-19 pandemic, Rector had time to make and release a Christmas album with the lack of scheduled conflicts, ahead of his reworked studio album The Joy of Music.

A fan of Christmas, Rector had always wanted to make a Christmas album. The selection of songs were researched and curated to express feelings of nostalgia and familiarity. Due to COVID-19 restrictions and inspired by A Charlie Brown Christmas, the songs featured a stripped, jazz-forward instrumentation. Recognizing a lack of attention toward Thanksgiving he wrote "The Thanksgiving Song". An associated lyric video for the song was made, and Rector streamed a live performance of A Ben Rector Christmas the following December.

== Background ==
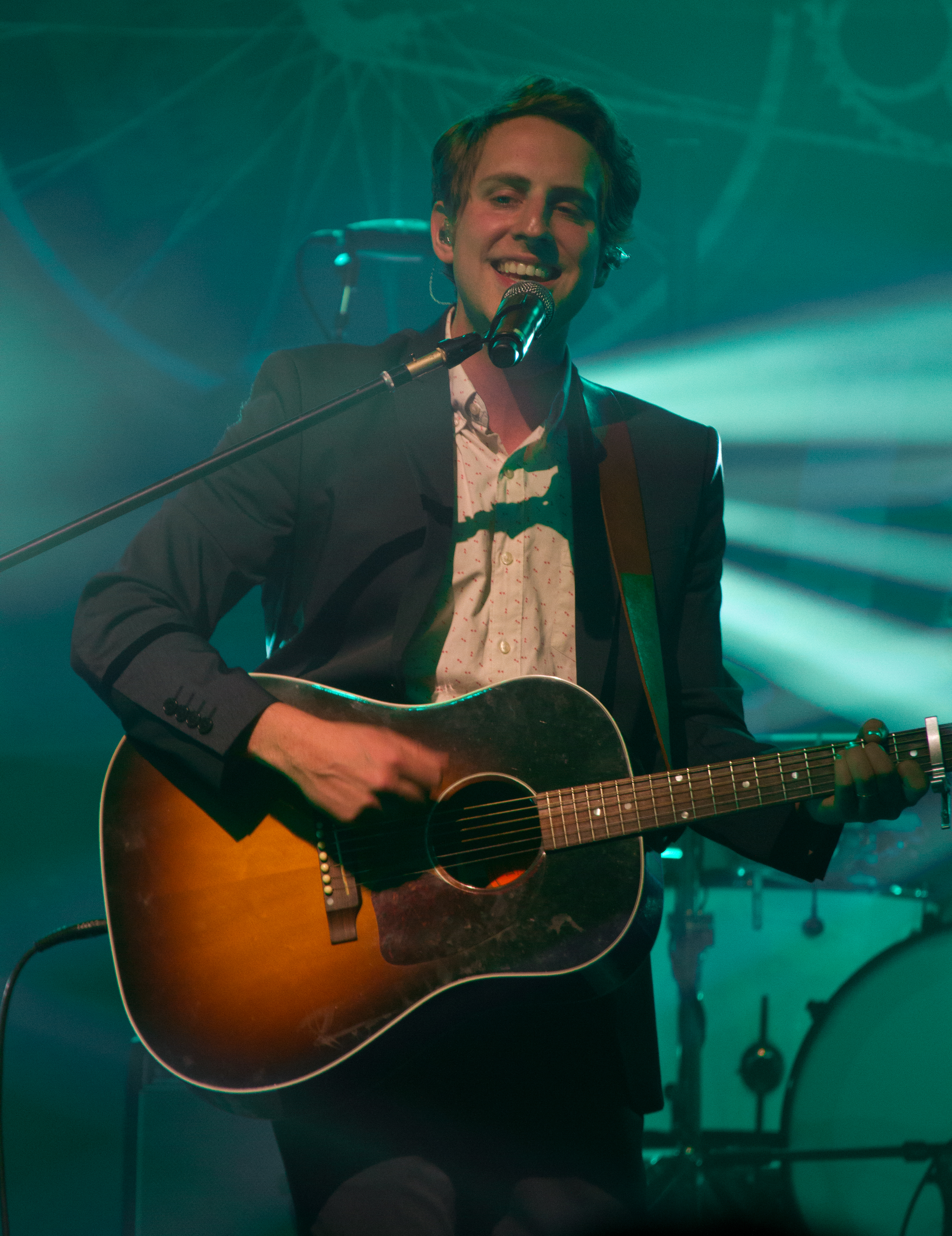
Ben Rector performing live in 2016

A fan of the Christmas season with it being his favorite holiday, Rector had always wanted to record a collection of Christmas songs. He appreciated the chord progressions, arrangements, and the unique style of singing, and he wanted to replicate it. By January 2020, Rector had recorded most of what would be his eighth studio album, The Joy of Music. He was slated to tour following his seventh album Magic with The Old Friends Acoustic Tour, but the COVID-19 pandemic and enforced lockdowns by the United States saw the tour cancelled. With the lack of scheduled conflicts, and holding off the release of the Joy in Music to be closer to when he could tour again, he seized the opportunity to release Christmas music for the holiday season. He would also rewrite 11 of the 13 tracks on The Joy of Music in the meantime.

Rector cited A Charlie Brown Christmas as the biggest inspiration for the album's direction. Since forming a large orchestra would be difficult amidst the pandemic, he instead opted for a smaller, stripped production with an emphasis on jazz instrumentation to imitate feelings of nostalgia. The songs were recorded August 2020 in a studio with social distancing rules, and were mixed by Buckley Miller. The lead single, "The Thanksgiving Song", released separately on October 27, 2020, and A Ben Rector Christmas released on November 13, 2020. The album also had a vinyl release, and Rector underestimated the demand of it. The artwork is derived from Bing Crosby's Christmas album Merry Christmas.

== Production ==
Many of the songs on the album Rector kept true to the source material, to reflect how good the original versions are; according to Rector, "You realize that they’re so good that they just play themselves." The collection curated were a selection of songs that paired well together, as well as what would be fun for Rector to sing. Each song was designed to express feelings of nostalgia and familiarity, and help put the listener at peace amidst the pandemic. He researched the history of each song and their various renditions, creating a revision of each that reflected both the original song and what he remembered as a child. "Frosty the Snowman" was an exception; having found no version he gravitated toward best, he composed the song to be an amalgamation of every version. He found "This Christmas" by Donny Hathaway to be the most difficult due to the song's unique jazz instrumentation and unique vocal performance. He selected "Christmas Time Is Here" from A Charlie Brown Christmas to be on the album for its unique elegance. Originally, "The Christmas Song" was not planned to be on the album. When the initial recording session went ahead of schedule, Rector, Nathan Dugger, and Scott Mulvahill stayed late and performed three takes of the song, resulting in its inclusion.

Rector wrote one original song for the album, "The Thanksgiving Song", a song celebrating the holiday Thanksgiving. Per the request of his manager Gregg Latterman, Rector originally planned to write an original Christmas song but could not come up with anything unique. Instead, he didn't know of any existing songs based on Thanksgiving besides a comedic song by Adam Sandler, which came as a surprise to him since "everyone has an emotional connection and a lot of memories around Thanksgiving", so he decided to write one himself. He also wanted to give Christmas purists something to listen to, to save Christmas music for after Thanksgiving. He made the song sound classic, pulling sonically from the Billy Joel era. To keep the chorus fresh at the end he rewrote the ending to reflect 2020, with the line "'we’ve made it through / I do believe / the longest year in history." He released it ahead of the rest of the album to give people something to listen before the holiday season. "The Thanksgiving Song" inspired him to release "The Best is Yet to Come", a song about New Years, the following year.

He released an associated lyric video of "The Thanksgiving Song" on YouTube; he opted not to do a traditional music video due to a lack of time. The video was designed by Brian Shutters, and depicted the making of a Thanksgiving meal, with various food items displayed the lyrics to the songs. Hidden within the video were references to Rector's life and career. He was "blown away" with Shutters' work, although he admitted the lyric video was above his pay grade. He also streamed a live performance online where he played the songs from the album on December 20, 2020.

== Track listing ==
A Ben Rector Christmas track listing
No.	Title	Length
1.	"The Thanksgiving Song"	3:04
2.	"It's the Most Wonderful Time of the Year"	2:52
3.	"Christmas Time Is Here"	2:53
4.	"This Christmas"	2:56
5.	"Frosty the Snowman"	2:43
6.	"Have Yourself a Merry Little Christmas"	2:36
7.	"The Christmas Song"	2:26
Total length:		19:32

== Charts ==
Chart performance for A Ben Rector Christmas
Chart (2020)	Peak position
US Top Holiday Albums (Billboard)	43
