= Dark Horse (Devin Dawson album) =

2018 album by Devin Dawson

Studio album by Devin Dawson
- Released: January 19, 2018
- Genres: Country; country pop
- Length: 43:03
- Label: Warner Bros. Nashville
- Producer: Jay Joyce

Devin Dawson chronology
Dark Horse (2018)	The Pink Slip (2021)

Singles from Devin Dawson
- 1. "All on Me" Released: April 3, 2017; 2. "Asking for a Friend" Released: April 30, 2018; 3. "Dark Horse" Released: December 10, 2018

Dark Horse is the debut studio album by American country music singer Devin Dawson. It was released on January 19, 2018, via Warner Bros. Records Nashville.

== Background ==
Before Devin became a country singer, he was in a band called "SHADOW OF THE COLOSSUS". 2 ALBUMS were made by SOTC, Self released their Self-Titled debut album on 6/12/2010. Inspired by amazing games like ICO, and SHADOW OF THE COLOSSUS, they even wrote about them in their songs on this self titled album. The second album to self-release was "END GAME" - More melodic, but with the same gut punching action! - These albums can be found on BANDCAMP, along with another song made afterwards called "EVOLUTION:REVOLUTION.

+ Before the album "END GAME" was out, DEVIN DAWSON had a little band, or a group of friends and a band called "DEVIN DAWSON" - album(demo) "THE IVORY COAST"...with well written lyrics, and soothing music. THE IVORY COAST had 3 songs on the demo. 1.) ALL MY LOVE 2.) FEAR 3.) THE IVORY COAST Released March 15, 2013 ALL MUSIC WRITTEN BY DEVIN DAWSON ALL MUSIC PRODUCED BY DEVIN DAWSON AND JOSHUA TOMLINSON ALL MUSIC MIXED BY DEVIN DAWSON AND JOSHUA TOMLINSON ALL TRACKS MASTERED BY JAKE LUBIN Band members Vocals/acoustic - DEVIN DAWSON Piano - Kevin Hutchens Electric guitar - Matt Roberts Drums - Josh Tomlinson Pedal steel/Electric guitar - Ben Little John Bass guitar - Quentin Flowers

Dawson co-wrote every song on the album, including lead single "All on Me". Jay Joyce served as the album's producer.

== Critical reception ==
Stephen Thomas Erlewine of AllMusic wrote that "There's a fleetness in Dawson's delivery, an exactitude in his songcraft, and a mellowness in his execution that push his music toward the confines of country". Sounds Like Nashville writer Annie Reuter reviewed the album positively, stating "His unique storytelling partnered with Joyce's standout production give Dark Horse a timeless appeal, which is surely just a taste of Dawson’s promising career".

== Commercial performance ==
The album debuted on Billboard's Top Country Albums at No. 5, selling 7,000 copies (11,000 in album equivalent units) in the first week. It has sold 18,000 copies in the United States as of June 2018.

== Track listing ==
No.	Title	Writer(s)	Length
1.	"Dip"	Devin Dawson, Barry Dean, Luke Laird	3:22
2.	"All on Me"	Dawson, Jacob Durrett, Austin Smith	3:44
3.	"Asking for a Friend"	Dawson, Connie Harrington, Brett Beavers	3:59
4.	"Second to Last"	Dawson, Laura Veltz, Mark Trussell	3:19
5.	"Symptoms"	Dawson, Smith	4:03
6.	"I Don't Care Who Sees"	Dawson, Smith, Jake Mitchell, Jacob Durrett	3:21
7.	"Secondhand Hurt"	Dawson, Will Bowen	4:01
8.	"Placebo"	Dawson, Jordan Reynolds, David Hodges	3:04
9.	"War Paint"	Dawson, Clint Lagerberg, Chris DuBois	3:42
10.	"I Can’t Trust Myself"	Dawson, Jillian Jacqueline, Brad Warren, Brett Warren	3:10
11.	"Prison"	Dawson, Seth Ennis, Josh Kerr	3:41
12.	"Dark Horse"	Dawson, Andy Albert, Andrew DeRoberts	3:31

== Personnel ==
Adapted from AllMusic

- Kip Allen – drums, handclapping, percussion, programming
- Devin Dawson – acoustic guitar, handclapping, lead vocals, background vocals
- Nick DiMaria – banjo, acoustic guitar, electric guitar, background vocals
- Fred Eltringham – programming
- Jason Hall – handclapping
- Jaxon Hargrove – handclapping
- Jillian Jacqueline – background vocals
- Jay Joyce – bass guitar, bells, bowed vibes, acoustic guitar, electric guitar, handclapping, keyboards, lap steel guitar, percussion, programming
- Jimmy Mansfield – handclapping
- Sam Rodberg – bass guitar, handclapping
- Austin Smith – electric guitar, handclapping, background vocals

== Charts ==
=== Weekly charts ===
Chart (2018)	Peak position
US Billboard 200	50
US Top Country Albums (Billboard)	5

=== Year-end charts ===
Chart (2018)	Position
US Top Country Albums (Billboard)	74
