= Devin Dawson =

American country music singer-songwriter (born 1989)

- Born: Devin Dawson Durrett; January 30, 1989 (age 37); Orangevale, California, U.S.
- Genres: Country; deathcore (early)
- Occupations: Singer; songwriter
- Instrument: Vocals
- Years active: 2012–present
- Label: Warner Bros.
- Formerly of: Shadow of the Colossus

Devin Dawson Durrett (born January 30, 1989) is an American country music singer and songwriter. He became known after filming a mashup of Taylor Swift songs with his fellow friend Louisa Wendorff on her YouTube channel, which gained popularity on YouTube. His debut single "All on Me" is also his first hit song. With the help of producer Jay Joyce, he signed to Warner Bros. Records in 2017. Dawson's "All on Me" has charted on the Hot Country Songs and Country Airplay charts.

Dawson was born in Orangevale, California. Before launching his solo career, he was the bass player for the deathcore band Shadow of the Colossus.

Dawson has also toured with Brett Eldredge, Tim McGraw and Faith Hill.

Dawson's debut album Dark Horse was released on January 19, 2018.

Dawson's band includes Austin Taylor Smith (guitar, vocals), Nick DiMaria (lead guitar), Sam Rodberg (bass guitar), and Kip Allen (drums).

== Discography ==
=== Studio albums ===
Title	Album details	Peak positions		Sales
Title	Album details	US	US Country	Sales
Dark Horse	Release date: January 19, 2018; Label: Warner Music Nashville; Formats: CD, digital download, LP, streaming	50	5	US: 18,000

=== Extended plays ===
Title	Details
The Pink Slip	Release date: January 15, 2021; Label: Warner Music Nashville; Formats: Digital download, streaming

=== Singles ===
Title	Year	Peak positions					Certifications	Album
Title	Year	US	US Country	US Country Airplay	CAN	CAN Country	Certifications	Album
"All on Me"	2017	52	6	2	75	2	RIAA: 2× Platinum; MC: Platinum	Dark Horse
"Asking for a Friend"	2018	—	—	52	—	—		Dark Horse
"Dark Horse"	2018	—	—	—	—	—		Dark Horse
"Range Rover"	2020	—	—	—	—	—		The Pink Slip
"—" denotes releases that did not chart

==== As a featured artist ====
Title	Year	Peak positions					Certifications	Album
Title	Year	US Country	US Country Airplay	US	CAN	CAN Country	Certifications	Album
"One Beer" (Hardy featuring Lauren Alaina and Devin Dawson)	2020	7	1	33	43	1	RIAA: 2× Platinum; MC: 2× Platinum	A Rock

=== Music videos ===
Year	Video	Director
2015	"Blind Man"	—N/a
2017	"All on Me"	Justin Clough
2018	"Asking for a Friend"	Patrick Tracy
2019	"Dark Horse"	Justin Clough

== Awards and nominations ==
Year	Association	Category	Nominated work	Result
2017	Academy of Country Music Awards	New Male Vocalist of the Year	Himself	Nominated
2019	Academy of Country Music Awards	Song of the Year	"God's Country"	Nominated
2019	Country Music Association Awards	Song of the Year	"God's Country"	Nominated
