= Stephen Day (singer) =

American musician

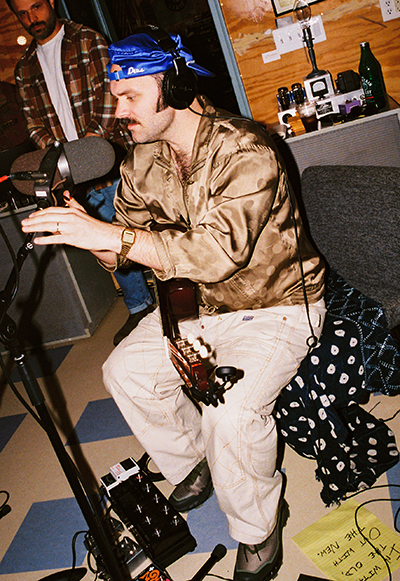
- Day in a studio 2026.

Background information
- Genres: Pop rock; soul; blues
- Instruments: Vocals; guitar
- Years active: 2016–present
- Label: Riser House
- Website: stephenday.org

Stephen Day is an American singer-songwriter based in Nashville, Tennessee. Day released his debut extended play Undergrad Romance and The Moses In Me in April 2016 during his sophomore year of college. Day has released four full-length studio albums, Guess I'm Grown Now — and its acoustic version, The Shapes I'm In, Gold Mine, and Stephen Day. Day has been signed to Riser House Records, based in Nashville, since October 2024.

== Background ==
Stephen Day grew up in Buford, Georgia, a town northeast of Atlanta. He started playing guitar in middle school before joining a choir in high school, where he also started writing songs. Day’s father was a pastor, and mom was a nurse practitioner. After finding his mom’s guitar in the closet, he taught himself to play through YouTube videos and a guitar teacher.

Day was inspired by John Mayer’s debut album Room For Squares and listened to it every day in middle school. He also grew up listening to artists like Stevie Wonder and Frank Sinatra. In 2014, Day moved to Nashville to pursue music while attending Belmont University.

== Career ==
His debut EP, Undergrad Romance and the Moses in Me, released in April 2016, steadily grew into a streaming success, helping build a catalog that has now surpassed 140 million plays.

His debut full-length album, Guess I’m Grown Now, led by tracks like "Dancing in the Street" and "For Life," expanded his reach, accumulating over 24 million streams.

On September 19th, 2025, Day released his 3rd album Gold Mine and followed it with a headlining tour.

Day has been on three of his own headline tours and has opened for other artists such as Teddy Swims, Ben Rector, Stephen Sanchez, KALEO, Lawrence, and Cory Wong.

Most recently, Day featured on the song "Home To Mother" by American singer-songwriter Stephen Sanchez, from his second studio album, Love, Love, Love.

Day has co-written many notable songs, including “Sweet Love” by Myles Smith and “Only Girl”, “Shake”, and “Be More” by Stephen Sanchez.

Day released his self-titled fourth album on October 2nd, 2026.

== Discography ==
=== Extended plays ===
Year	Title
2016	Undergrad Romance and the Moses in Me
2020	Original Songs and Sound
2021	Original Songs and Sound (Deluxe Version)
2022	Stephen Day | OurVinyl Sessions

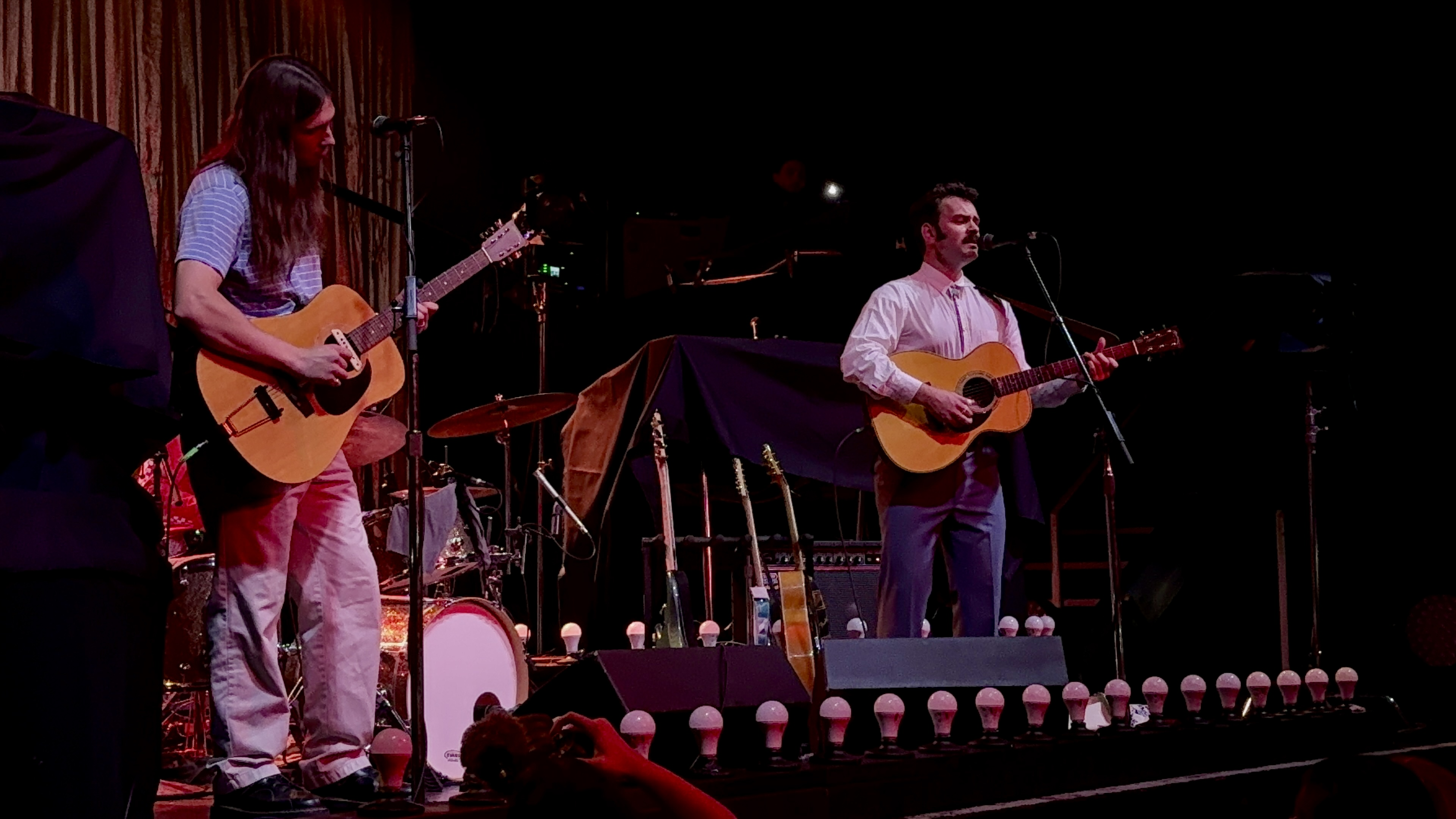
Day opening for Stephen Sanchez in Minneapolis in October 2023.

=== Studio albums ===
Title	Release year	Notes
2019	Guess I'm Grown Now	
2020	Guess I'm Grown Now (Acoustic Album)	
2021	Franky Ave (Live)	Live album
2021	The Shapes I'm In	
2024	Gold Mine	
2026	Stephen Day	

=== Singles ===
Year	Title
2024	"It's Christmas All Over"
2025	Sweet Iced Tea" (featuring Allen Stone)
2025	"Old News"

=== Guest Singles ===
Year	Title	Artist	Album
2025	Tongue Tied	Cory Wong	Lost In The Wonder
2026	Stay With Me	Cory Wong	Lost In The Wonder
2026	Home to Mother	Stephen Sanchez	Love, Love, Love

== Tours ==
=== Headlining ===
- The Shapes I'm In Tour (2022)
- Gold Mine Tour (2025)
- The Self-Titled Tour (2026)

=== Supporting act ===
- Teddy Swims — Tough Love World Tour (2022)
- Ben Rector — The Joy Of Music: Live Tour (2022)
- Ben Rector — The Old Friends Acoustic Tour (2023)
- Stephen Sanchez — Live In Person (2023)
- Lawrence – The Family Business Tour (2024)
- KALEO – Mixed Emotions Tour (2025)
- Couch – Big Talk Tour (2025)
